= 1963 =

1963 in various calendars
- Gregorian calendar: 1963; MCMLXIII
- Ab urbe condita: 2716
- Armenian calendar: 1412; ԹՎ ՌՆԺԲ
- Assyrian calendar: 6713
- Baháʼí calendar: 119–120
- Balinese saka calendar: 1884–1885
- Bengali calendar: 1369–1370
- Berber calendar: 2913
- British Regnal year: 11 Eliz. 2 – 12 Eliz. 2
- Buddhist calendar: 2507
- Burmese calendar: 1325
- Byzantine calendar: 7471–7472
- Chinese calendar: 壬寅年 (Water Tiger); 4660 or 4453 — to — 癸卯年 (Water Rabbit); 4661 or 4454
- Coptic calendar: 1679–1680
- Discordian calendar: 3129
- Ethiopian calendar: 1955–1956
- Hebrew calendar: 5723–5724
- Hindu calendars
- Vikram Samvat: 2019–2020
- Shaka Samvat: 1884–1885
- Kali Yuga: 5063–5064
- Holocene calendar: 11963
- Igbo calendar: 963–964
- Iranian calendar: 1341–1342
- Islamic calendar: 1382–1383
- Japanese calendar: Shōwa 38 (昭和３８年)
- Javanese calendar: 1894–1895
- Juche calendar: 52
- Julian calendar: Gregorian minus 13 days
- Korean calendar: 4296
- Minguo calendar: ROC 52 民國52年
- Nanakshahi calendar: 495
- Thai solar calendar: 2506
- Tibetan calendar: ཆུ་ཕོ་སྟག་ལོ་ (male Water-Tiger); 2089 or 1708 or 936 — to — ཆུ་མོ་ཡོས་ལོ་ (female Water-Hare); 2090 or 1709 or 937

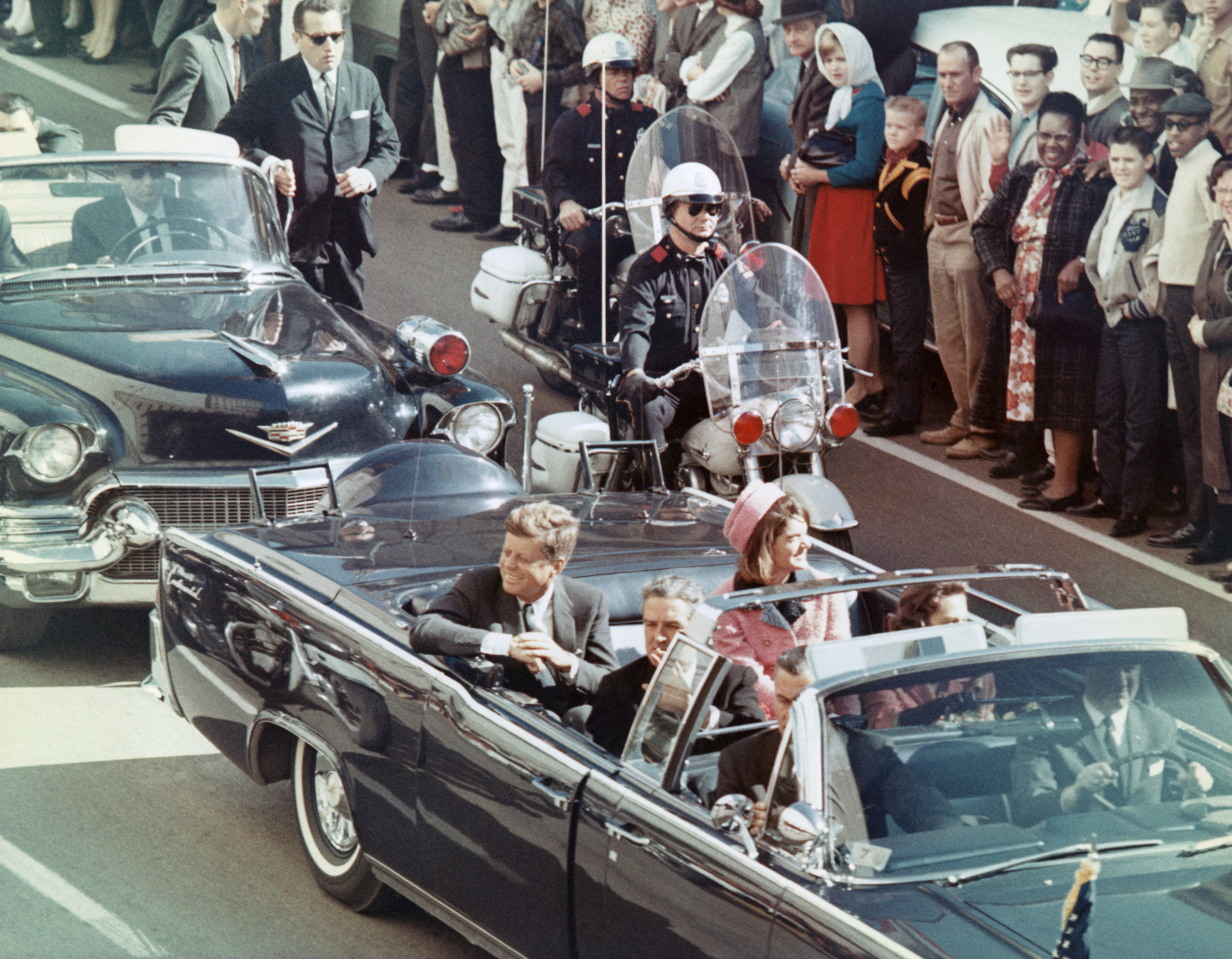
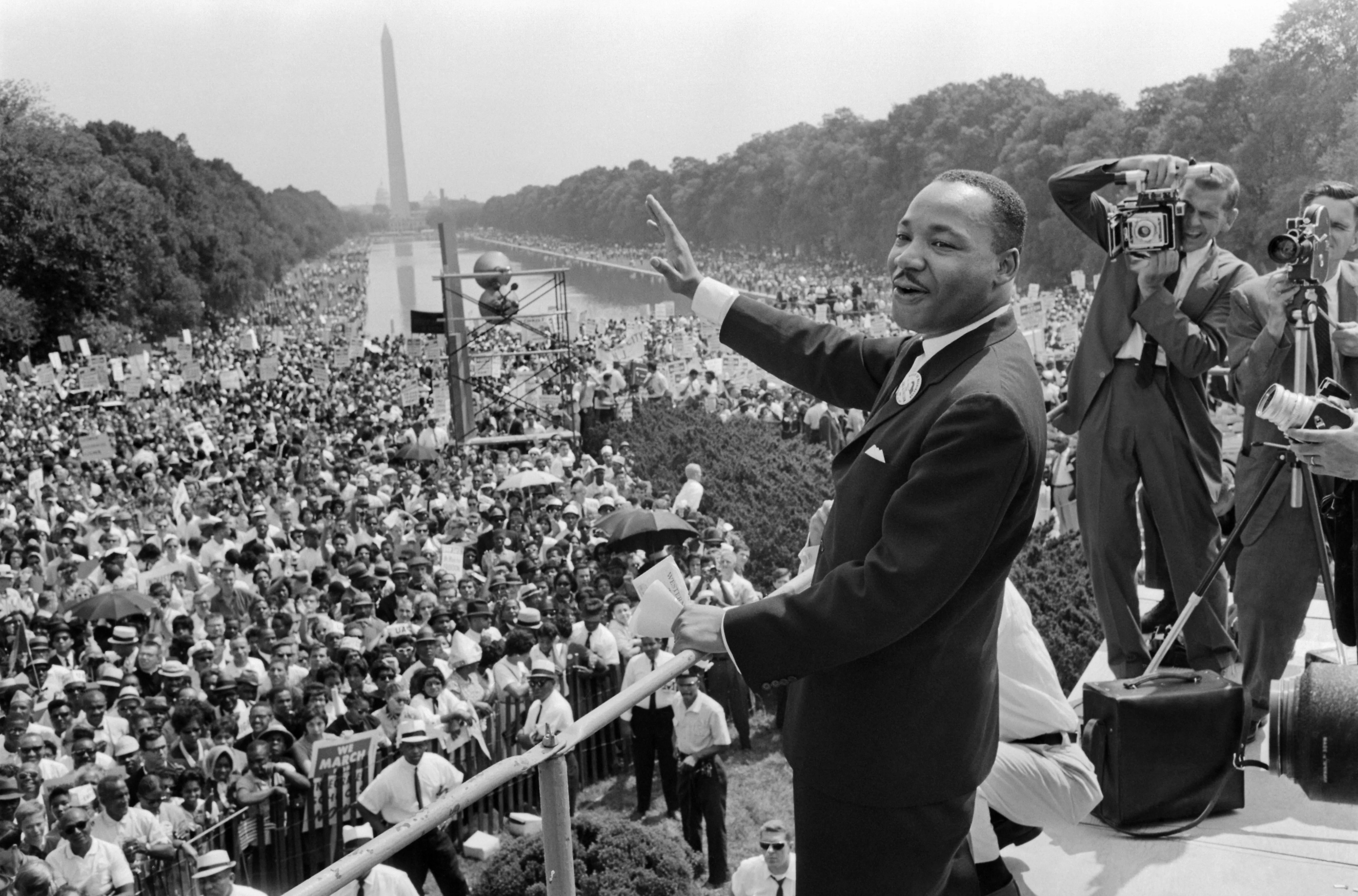
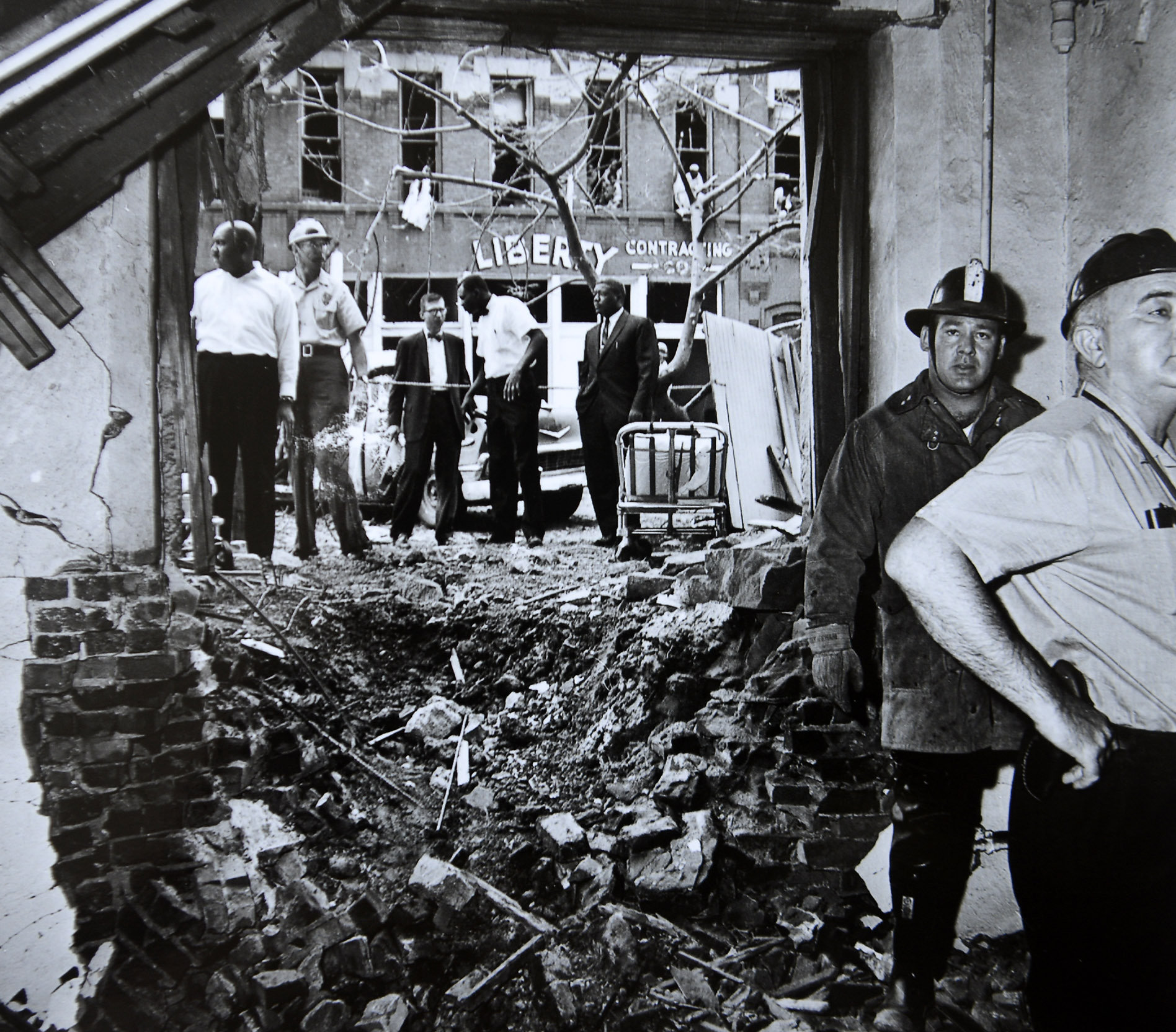
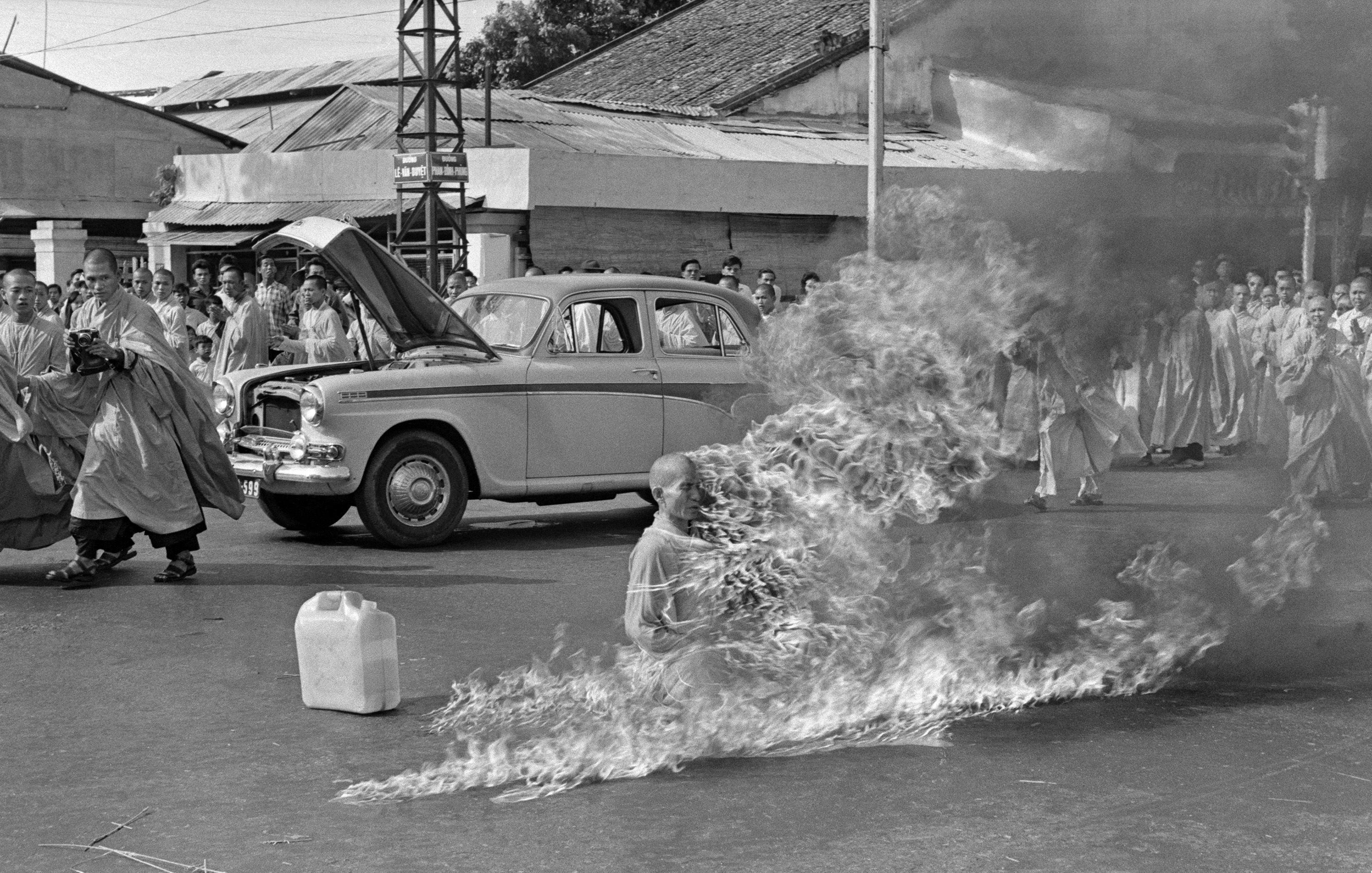
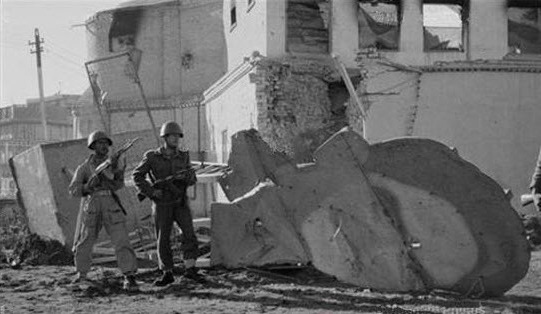
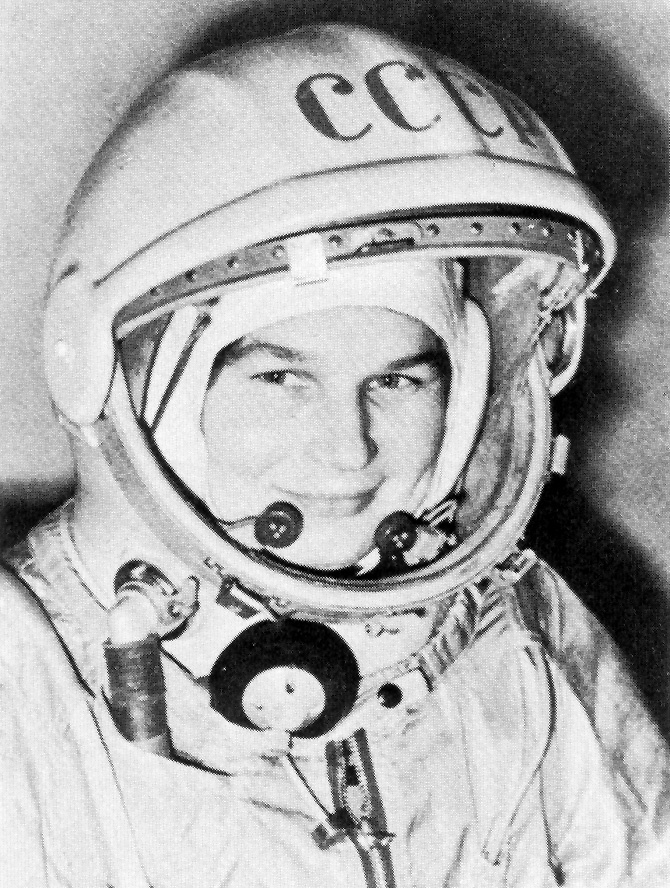
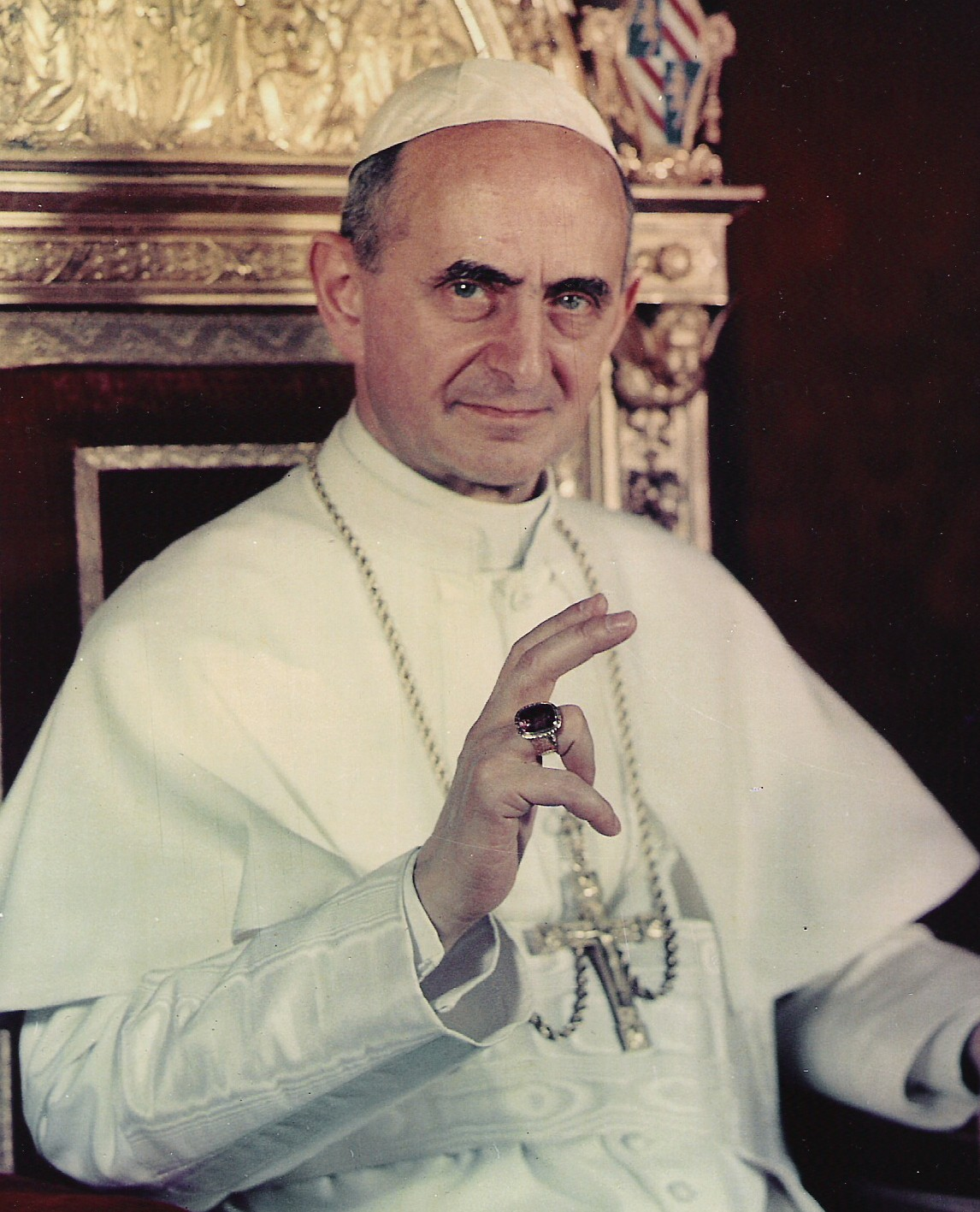
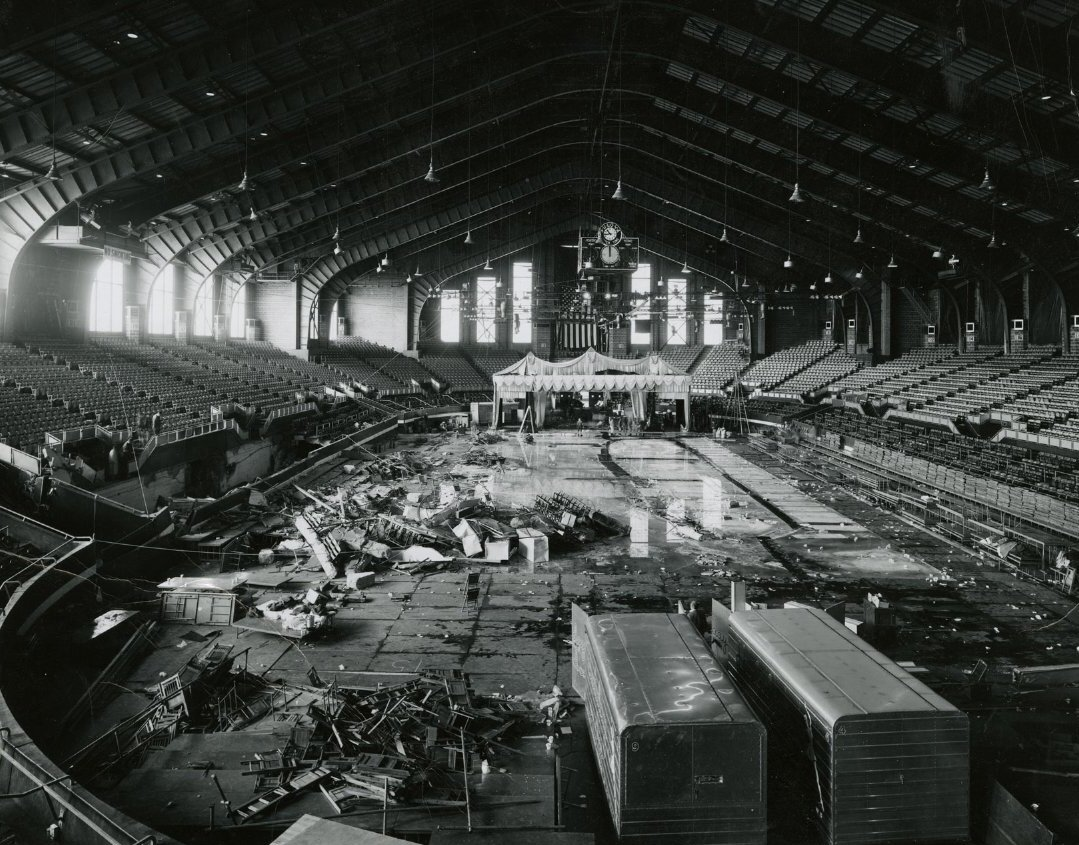
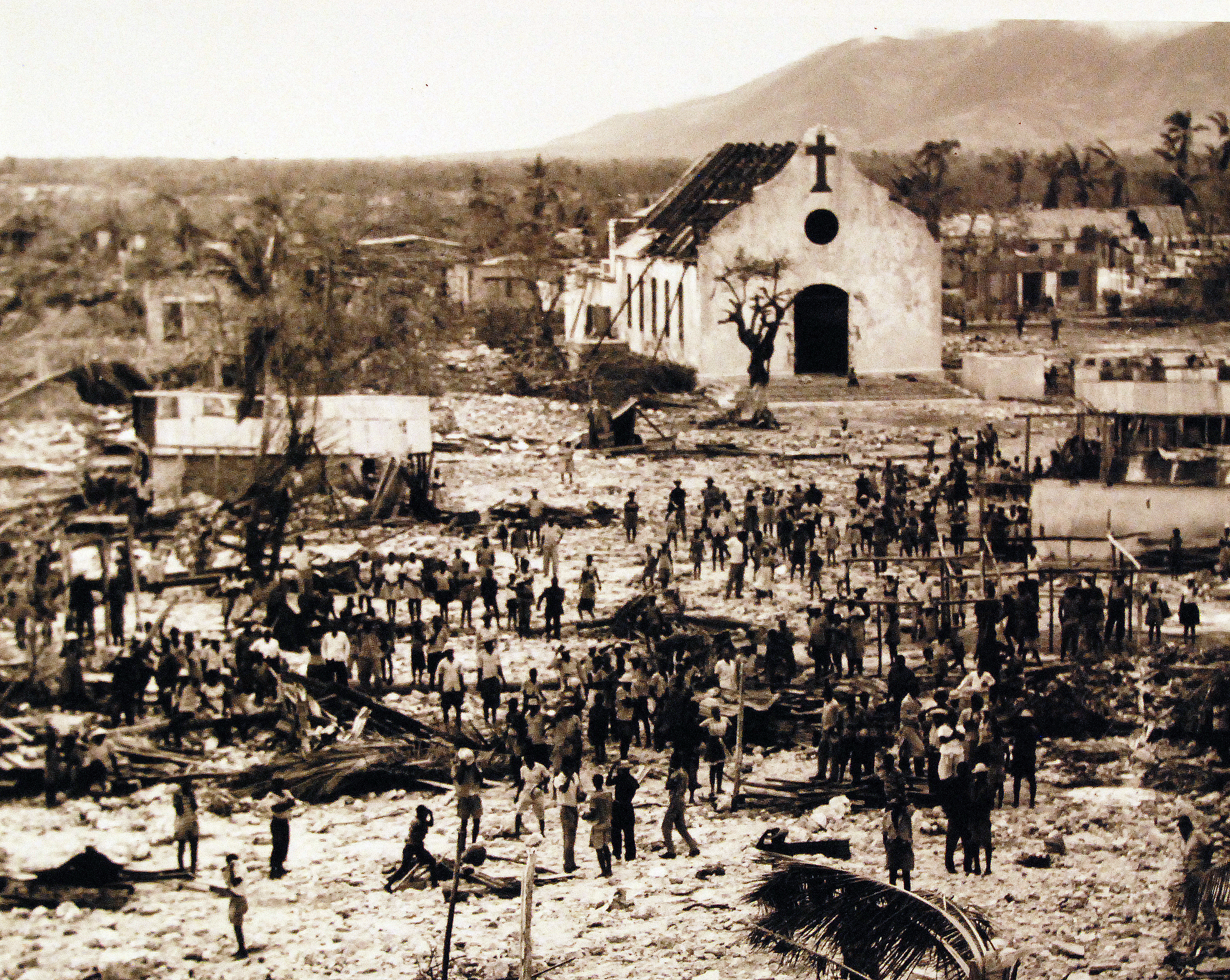
From top to bottom, left to right: U.S. President John F. Kennedy is assassinated in Dallas, Texas; Martin Luther King Jr. gives his "I Have a Dream" speech at the March on Washington for Jobs and Freedom; the 16th Street Baptist Church bombing in Birmingham, Alabama kills four girls; the Buddhist crisis in South Vietnam sparks protests and self-immolations; the Ramadan Revolution overthrows Qasim's regime in Iraq; the Soviet Vostok 6 sends Valentina Tereshkova as the first woman in space; Pope Paul VI succeeds John XXIII and continues the Second Vatican Council; the 1963 Indiana State Fairgrounds Coliseum gas explosion kills 81 in Indianapolis; and Hurricane Flora devastates the Caribbean, killing thousands.

1963 (MCMLXIII) was a common year starting on Tuesday of the Gregorian calendar, the 1963rd year of the Common Era (CE) and Anno Domini (AD) designations, the 963rd year of the 2nd millennium, the 63rd year of the 20th century, and the 4th year of the 1960s decade.

== Events ==
=== January ===
- January 1 – Bogle–Chandler case: Commonwealth Scientific and Industrial Research Organisation scientist Dr. Gilbert Bogle and Mrs. Margaret Chandler are found dead (presumed poisoned), in bushland near the Lane Cove River, Sydney, Australia.
- January 2 – Vietnam War – Battle of Ap Bac: The Viet Cong win their first major victory.
- January 9 – A total penumbral lunar eclipse is visible in the Americas, Europe, Africa and Asia, and is the 56th lunar eclipse of Lunar Saros 114. Gamma has a value of −1.01282. It occurs on the night between Wednesday, January 9 and Thursday, January 10, 1963.
- January 13 – 1963 Togolese coup d'état: A military coup in Togo results in the installation of coup leader Emmanuel Bodjollé as president.
- January 17 – A last quarter moon occurs between the penumbral lunar eclipse and the annular solar eclipse, only 12 hours, 29 minutes after apogee.
- January 19 – Soviet spy Gheorghe Pintilie is removed from his position as Deputy Interior Minister of the Romanian People's Republic, as a step in ensuring Romania's political independence; the Workers' Party Politburo discusses way of neutralizing "Soviet intelligence networks [...] which Gheorghe Pintilie had coordinated."
- January 22 – France and West Germany sign the Élysée Treaty.
- January 25 – A large annular solar eclipse covers 99.5% of the Sun and a narrow path (at most 19.6 km (12.2 mi)). It is visible in Chile, Argentina, South Africa and Madagascar, and is the 26th solar eclipse of Solar Saros 140. Gamma has a value of -0.48984.
- January 26 – The Australia Day shootings rock Perth; 2 people are shot dead and 3 others injured by Eric Edgar Cooke.
- January 29 – French President Charles de Gaulle vetoes the United Kingdom's entry into the European Common Market.

=== February ===
- February 5 – The European Court of Justice's ruling in Van Gend en Loos v Nederlandse Administratie der Belastingen establishes the principle of direct effect, one of the basic tenets of European Union law.
- February 8 – Travel, financial and commercial transactions by United States citizens to Cuba are made illegal by the John F. Kennedy Administration.
- February 10 – Five Japanese cities located on the northernmost part of Kyūshū are merged and become the city of Kitakyūshū, with a population of more than 1 million.
- February 12 – Northwest Orient Airlines Flight 705 crashes in the Florida Everglades, killing all 43 aboard.
- February 14 – Harold Wilson becomes leader of the opposition Labour Party in the United Kingdom; in October 1964 he becomes prime minister.
- February 21 – The 5.6 M_{w} Marj earthquake affects northern Libya with a maximum Mercalli intensity of VIII (Severe), causing 290–375 deaths and 375–500 injuries.
- February 27 – Juan Bosch takes office as the 41st president of the Dominican Republic.

=== March ===
- March 4 – In Paris, six people are sentenced to death for conspiring to assassinate President Charles de Gaulle. De Gaulle pardons five, but the other conspirator, Jean Bastien-Thiry, is executed by firing squad several days later.
- March 5 – Country music star Patsy Cline is killed in a plane crash along with country performers Cowboy Copas, Hawkshaw Hawkins, and manager Randy Hughes, during a flight from Kansas City, Missouri, back to Nashville.
- March 17 – Mount Agung erupts on Bali, killing approximately 1,500.
- March 22 – The Beatles first album Please Please Me was released in the UK and became a huge commercial success.
- March 23 – "Dansevise" by Grethe & Jørgen Ingmann (music by Otto Francker, text by Sejr Volmer-Sørensen) wins the Eurovision Song Contest 1963 (staged in London) for Denmark.
- March 28 – Civil rights movement: Over one hundred high school students conduct a sit-in protest in Rome, Georgia.
- March 30 – Indigenous Australians are legally allowed to drink alcohol in New South Wales.

=== April ===
- April 6 – The Kingsmen record their influential cover of "Louie Louie" in Portland, Oregon, released in June.
- April 7 – Yugoslavia is proclaimed to be a socialist republic, and Josip Broz Tito is named President for Life.
- April 8 – The 35th Academy Awards ceremony is held. Lawrence of Arabia wins Best Picture.
- April 10 – The U.S. nuclear submarine Thresher sinks 220 mi (190 nmi; 350 km) east of Cape Cod; all 129 aboard (112 crewmen plus yard personnel) die.
- April 11 – Pope John XXIII issues his final encyclical, Pacem in terris, entitled On Establishing Universal Peace in Truth, Justice, Charity and Liberty, the first papal encyclical addressed to "all men of good will", rather than to Roman Catholics only.
- April 12 – The Soviet nuclear powered submarine K-33 collides with the Finnish merchant vessel M/S Finnclipper in the Danish Straits. Although severely damaged, both vessels make it to port.
- April 14 – The Institute of Mental Health (Belgrade) is established.
- April 16 – Martin Luther King, Jr. issues his "Letter from Birmingham Jail".
- April 20 – In Quebec, Canada, members of the terrorist group Front de libération du Québec bomb a Canadian Army recruitment center, killing night watchman Wilfred V. O'Neill.
- April 21–23 – The first election of the Supreme Institution of the Baháʼí Faith (known as the Universal House of Justice, whose seat is at the Baháʼí World Centre on Mount Carmel in Haifa, Israel) is held.
- April 22 – Lester Bowles Pearson becomes the 14th Prime Minister of Canada.
- April 28 – 1963 general election is held in Italy.
- April 29 – Buddy Rogers becomes the first WWWF Champion.

=== May ===
- May 1 – The Coca-Cola Company introduces its first diet drink, Tab cola.
- May 2 – Berthold Seliger launches near Cuxhaven a 3-stage rocket with a maximum flight altitude of more than 100 km (62 mi) (the only sounding rocket developed in Germany).
- May 4 – The Le Monde Theater fire in Dioirbel, Senegal, kills 64 people.
- May 8 – Huế Phật Đản shootings: The Army of the Republic of Vietnam opens fire on Buddhists who defy a ban on the flying of the Buddhist flag on Vesak, the birthday of Gautama Buddha, killing 9. Earlier, President Ngô Đình Diệm allowed the flying of the Vatican flag in honour of his brother, Archbishop Ngô Đình Thục, triggering the Buddhist crisis in South Vietnam.
- May 13 – A smallpox outbreak hits Stockholm, Sweden, lasting until July.
- May 14 – Kuwait becomes the 111th member of the United Nations.
- May 15 – Project Mercury: NASA launches Gordon Cooper on Mercury-Atlas 9, the last Mercury mission (on June 12 NASA Administrator James E. Webb tells Congress the program is complete).
- May 22 – A.C. Milan beats Benfica 2–1 at Wembley Stadium, London and wins the 1962–63 European Cup (football).
- May 23 – Fidel Castro visits the Soviet Union.
- May 25 – The Organisation of African Unity is established in Addis Ababa, Ethiopia.

=== June ===
- June 3 – Huế chemical attacks: The Army of the Republic of Vietnam rains liquid chemicals on the heads of Buddhist protestors, injuring 67 people. The United States threatens to cut off aid to the regime of Ngô Đình Diệm.
- June 4 – President of the United States John F. Kennedy signs Executive Order 11110, authorizing the Secretary of the Treasury to continue issuing silver certificates.
- June 5 – The first annual National Hockey League Entry Draft is held in Montreal, Canada.

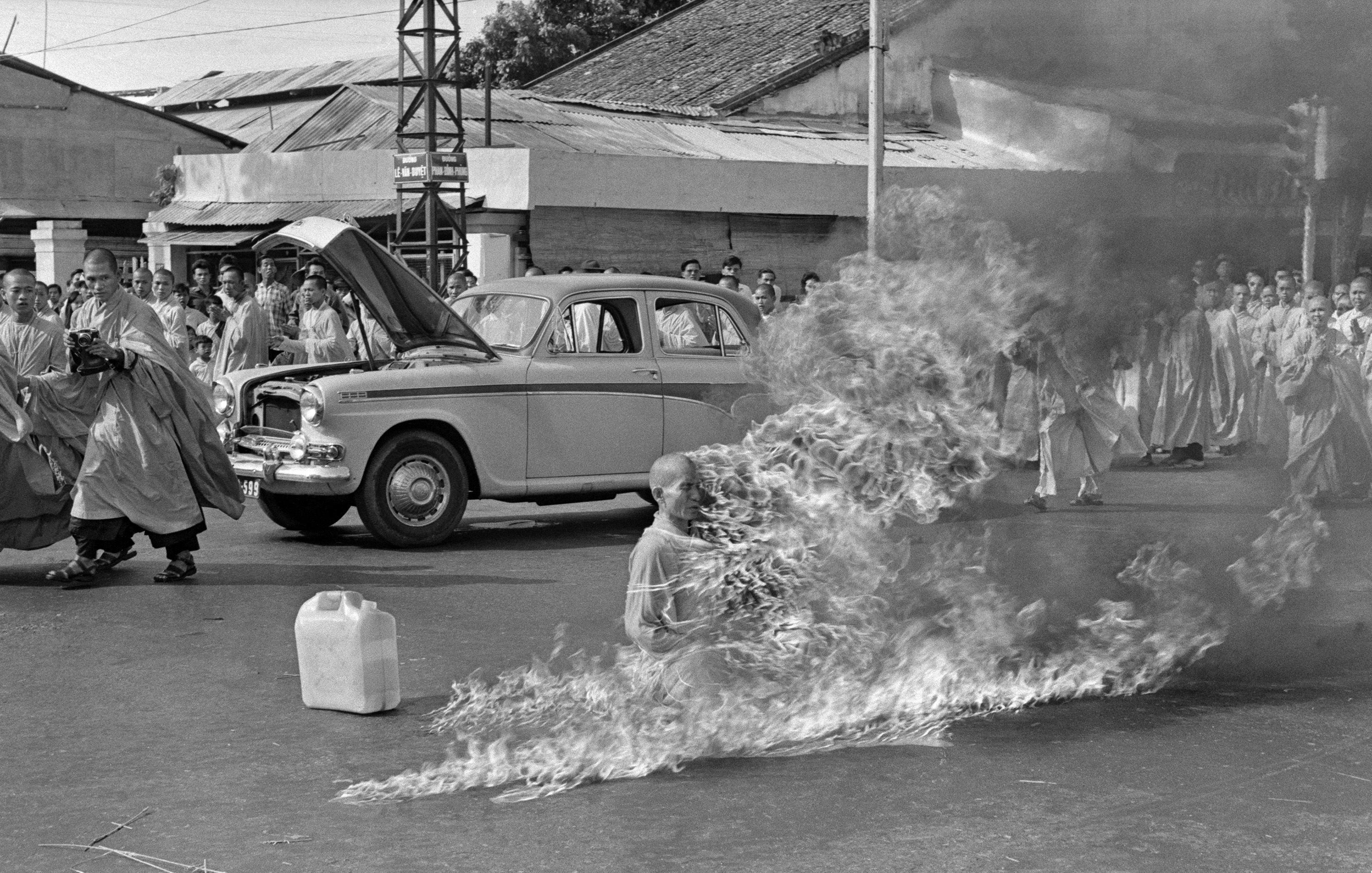
Thích Quảng Đức's self-immolation

- June 11 – In Saigon, Buddhist monk Thích Quảng Đức commits self-immolation to protest the oppression of Buddhists by Ngô Đình Diệm's government.
- June 12 – Civil Rights activist Medgar Evers is assassinated by white supremacist Byron De La Beckwith
- June 13
  - The cancellation of Mercury-Atlas 10 effectively ends the United States' crewed spaceflight Project Mercury.
  - The New York Commodity Exchange begins trading silver futures contracts.
- June 15 – The AC Cobra makes its first appearance at the 24 Hours of Le Mans. It will go on to win its class the following year.
- June 16 – Vostok 6 carries Soviet cosmonaut Valentina Tereshkova, the first woman into space.
- June 17 – In Abington School District v. Schempp, the US Supreme Court ruled that compulsory prayer and Bible-reading violated the First Amendment.
- June 19 – Valentina Tereshkova, the first woman in space, returns to Earth, landing in the Soviet Union.
- June 20
  - Establishment of the Moscow–Washington hotline (officially, the Direct Communications Link or DCL; unofficially, the "red telephone"; and in fact a teleprinter link) is authorized by the signing of a Memorandum of Understanding in Geneva by representatives of the Soviet Union and the United States.
  - Swedish Air Force Colonel Stig Wennerström is arrested as a spy for the Soviet Union.
  - War film The Great Escape (starring Steve McQueen and Richard Attenborough) is premiered in London.
- June 21 – Pope Paul VI (Giovanni Battista Montini) succeeds Pope John XXIII as the 262nd pope.
- June 26
  - John F. Kennedy gives his "Ich bin ein Berliner" speech in West Berlin, Germany.
  - David Ben-Gurion is replaced by Levi Eshkol as prime minister of Israel.

=== July ===
- July 1 – ZIP codes are introduced by the United States Postal Service.
- July 5 – Diplomatic relations between the Israeli and the Japanese governments are raised to embassy level.
- July 7 – Double Seven Day scuffle: Secret police loyal to Ngô Đình Nhu, brother of President Ngô Đình Diệm, attack American journalists including Peter Arnett and David Halberstam at a demonstration during the Buddhist crisis in South Vietnam.
- July 11 – South Africa: police raid Liliesleaf Farm to the north of Johannesburg, arresting a group of African National Congress leaders.
- July 19 – American test pilot Joe Walker, flying the X-15, reaches an altitude of 65.8 miles (105.9 kilometers), making it a sub-orbital spaceflight by recognized international standards.
- July 26
  - An earthquake in Skopje, Yugoslavia (present-day North Macedonia) leaves 1,800 dead.
  - NASA launches Syncom 2, the world's first geostationary (synchronous) satellite.
- July 30 – The Soviet newspaper Izvestia reports that British diplomat and double agent Kim Philby has been given asylum in Moscow.

=== August ===
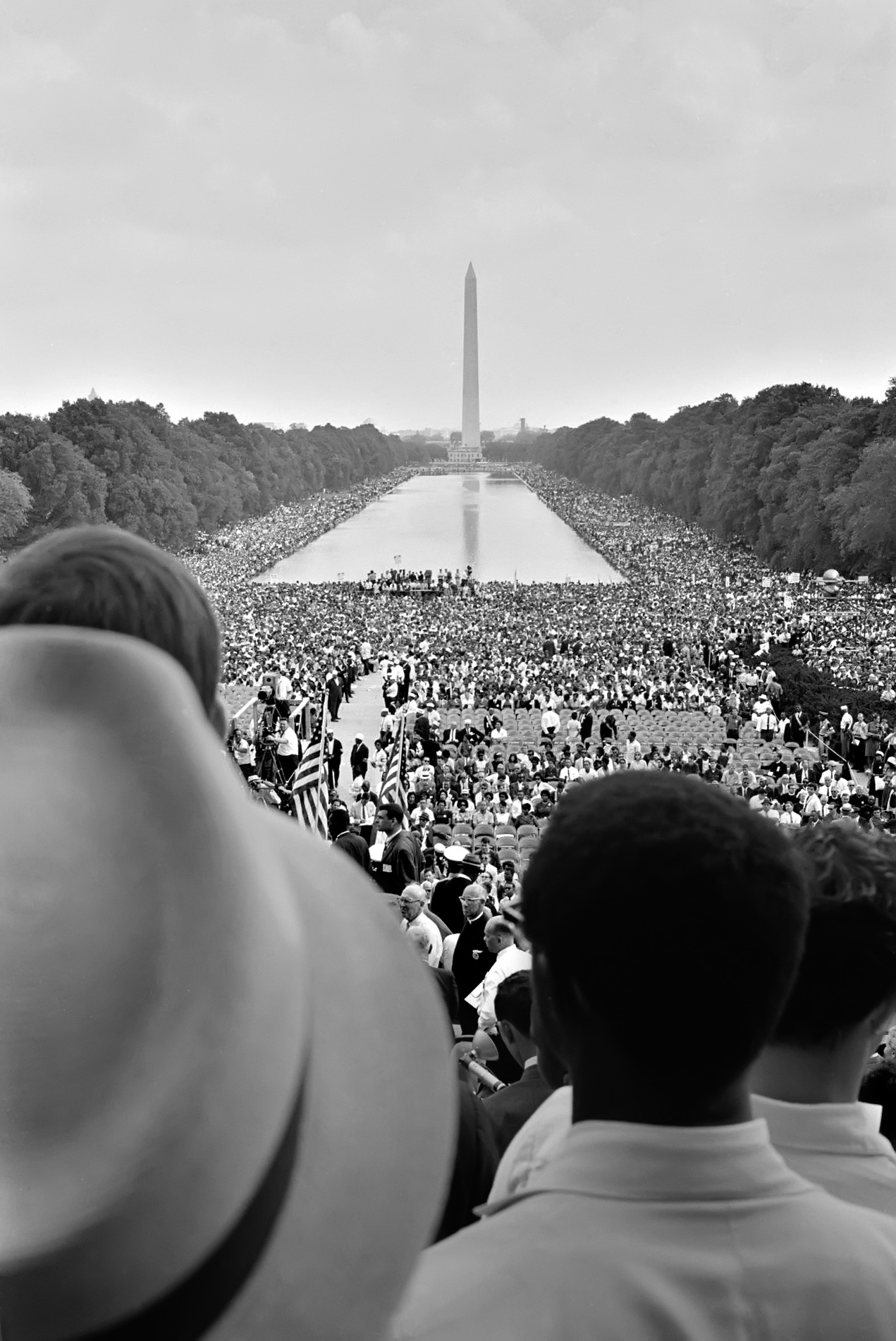
August 28: March on Washington for Jobs and Freedom

- August 5 – The United States, United Kingdom and Soviet Union sign the Partial Nuclear Test Ban Treaty.
- August 8 – The Great Train Robbery takes place in Buckinghamshire, England.
- August 14 – A huge and devastating forest fire hits the region around Paraná State, Brazil. According to government documents, two million hectares (4.94 million acres) are lost to burning and 110 persons perished.
- August 15 – Trois Glorieuses: President Fulbert Youlou is overthrown in the Republic of Congo after a three-day uprising in the capital, Brazzaville.
- August 15 - The King of Prussia Mall opens to the public in the Philadelphia metropolitan area and is one of the top ten largest malls in the U.S.
- August 21 – Xá Lợi Pagoda raids: The Army of the Republic of Vietnam Special Forces loyal to Ngô Đình Nhu, brother of President Ngô Đình Diệm, vandalise Buddhist pagodas across South Vietnam, arresting thousands and leaving an estimated hundreds dead. In the wake of the raids, the Kennedy administration by Cable 243 orders the United States Embassy, Saigon to explore alternative leadership in the country, opening the way towards a coup against Diệm.
- August 22 – American test pilot Joe Walker again achieves a sub-orbital spaceflight according to international standards, this time by piloting the X-15 to an altitude of 67.0 miles (107.8 kilometers).
- August 24 – First games played in the Bundesliga, the primary professional Association football league in West Germany, replacing the Oberliga.
- August 28 – Martin Luther King Jr. delivers his "I Have a Dream" speech on the steps of the Lincoln Memorial to an audience of at least 250,000, during the March on Washington for Jobs and Freedom. It is, at that point, the single largest protest in American history.
- August 28 – Philips introduces the Compact Cassette primarily for dictation and voice recording purposes. By 1965, hardware improvements eventually allow for it to reliably function as a music format.
- August 30 – The Moscow–Washington hotline (a direct teleprinter link) is inaugurated by U.S. President John F. Kennedy.

=== September ===
- September 1 – Establishment of language areas and facilities in Belgium comes into effect. This will become the foundation for further state reform in Belgium.
- September 6 – The Centre for International Intellectual Property Studies (CEIPI) is founded.
- September 10 – Sicilian Mafia boss Bernardo Provenzano is indicted for murder (he is captured 43 years later, on April 11, 2006).
- September 15 – American civil rights movement: The 16th Street Baptist Church bombing, in Birmingham, Alabama, kills 4 and injures 22.
- September 16 – Malaysia is formed through the merging of the Federation of Malaya and the British crown colony of Singapore, North Borneo (renamed Sabah) and Sarawak.
- September 18 – Rioters burn down the British Embassy in Jakarta, to protest the formation of Malaysia.
- September 19 – Iota Phi Theta fraternity is founded at Morgan State College in Baltimore, Maryland
- September 23 – King Fahd University of Petroleum and Minerals is established by a Saudi Royal Decree as the College of Petroleum and Minerals.
- September 24 – The United States Senate ratifies the Partial Nuclear Test Ban Treaty.
- September 25 – In the Dominican Republic, Juan Bosch is deposed by a coup d'état led by the military with civilian support.
- September 29 – The second period of the Second Vatican Council in Rome opens.

=== October ===
- October 1
  - U.S. President John F. Kennedy toasts Emperor Haile Selassie at a luncheon in Rockville, Maryland.
  - Construction company GK Međimurje, one of the largest Croatian construction and civil engineering companies (with more than 8,000 employees in 1980s), founded in Čakovec.
- October 2
  - Nigeria becomes a republic; The 1st Republican Constitution is established.
  - The Presidential Commission on the Status of Women in the United States issues its final reports to President Kennedy.
- October 3 – 1963 Honduran coup d'état: A violent coup in Honduras pre-empts the October 13 election, ends a period of reform under President Ramón Villeda Morales and begins two decades of military rule under General Oswaldo López Arellano.
- October 4 – Hurricane Flora, one of the worst Atlantic storms in history, hits Hispaniola and Cuba, killing nearly 7,000 people.
- October 7 – Buddhist crisis: Amid worsening relations, outspoken South Vietnamese First Lady Madame Ngo Dinh Nhu arrives in the US for a speaking tour, continuing a flurry of attacks on the Kennedy administration.
- October 9 – In northeast Italy, over 2,000 people are killed when a large landslide behind the Vajont Dam causes a giant wave of water to overtop it.
- October 10 – Partial Nuclear Test Ban Treaty, signed on August 5, takes effect.
- October 14 – A revolution starts in Radfan, South Yemen, against British colonial rule.
- October 16 – Ludwig Erhard replaces Konrad Adenauer as Chancellor of West Germany.
- October 19 – Alec Douglas-Home succeeds Harold Macmillan as Prime Minister of the United Kingdom.
- October 24 – Fire at the Soviet Union's Baikonur Cosmodrome in an R-9 Desna underground missile silo; seven people are killed.
- October 30 – The car manufacturing firm Lamborghini is founded in Italy.
- October 31 – 1963 Indiana State Fairgrounds Coliseum gas explosion: 81 die in a gas explosion during a Holiday on Ice show at the Indiana State Fairgrounds Coliseum in Indianapolis, United States.

=== November ===
- November 1 – Arecibo Observatory, a radio telescope, officially begins operation in Puerto Rico.
- November 2 – 1963 South Vietnamese coup: Arrest and assassination of Ngo Dinh Diem, the South Vietnamese President.
- November 6 – 1963 South Vietnamese coup: Coup leader General Dương Văn Minh takes over as leader of South Vietnam.
- November 7
  - 11 German miners are rescued from a collapsed mine after 14 days in what becomes known as the "Wunder von Lengede" ("miracle of Lengede").
  - The star-studded movie It's a Mad, Mad, Mad, Mad World premieres in Los Angeles.
- November 8 – Finnair aircraft OH-LCA crashes before landing at Mariehamn Airport on Åland.
- November 9 – Two disasters in Japan:
  - Miike coal mine explosion: A coal mine explosion kills 458 and sends 839 carbon monoxide poisoning victims to the hospital.
  - Tsurumi rail accident: A triple train disaster in Yokohama kills 161.
- November 10 – Malcolm X makes a historic speech in Detroit, Michigan ("Message to the Grass Roots").
- November 14 – A volcanic eruption under the sea near Iceland creates a new island, Surtsey.

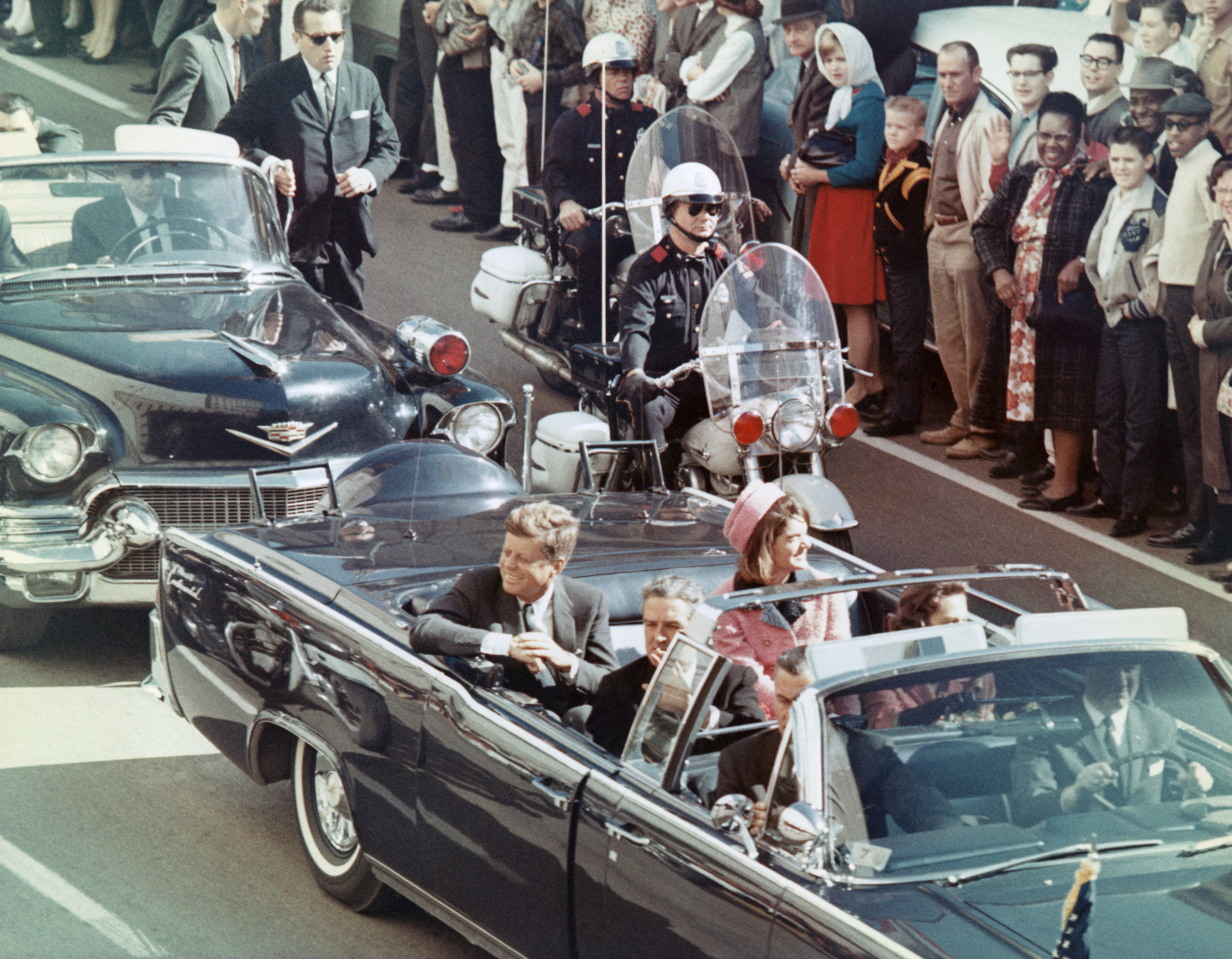
November 22: Assassination of John F. Kennedy

- November 22 – Assassination of John F. Kennedy: In a motorcade in Dallas, Texas, U.S. President John F. Kennedy is fatally shot by Lee Harvey Oswald, and Governor of Texas John Connally is seriously wounded at 12:30 CST. Upon Kennedy's death, Vice President Lyndon B. Johnson becomes the 36th president of the United States.
- November 23
  - The Golden Age Nursing Home fire kills 63 elderly people near Fitchville, Ohio, United States.
  - The long-running sci-fi television series Doctor Who premieres on BBC TV in the United Kingdom.
- November 25 – State funeral of John F. Kennedy: President Kennedy is buried at Arlington National Cemetery. Schools around the nation cancel classes that day; millions watch the funeral on live international television. Lee Harvey Oswald's funeral takes place on the same day.
- November 29
  - U.S. President Lyndon B. Johnson establishes the Warren Commission to investigate the assassination of John F. Kennedy.
  - Trans-Canada Air Lines Flight 831, a Douglas DC-8 crashes into a wooded hillside after taking-off from Dorval International Airport near Montreal, killing all 118 on board, the worst air disaster for many years in Canada's history.
  - Foundation stone for Mirzapur Cadet College is laid in East Pakistan (present-day Bangladesh).
- November 30 – 1963 Australian federal election: Robert Menzies' Liberal/Country Coalition Government is re-elected with an increased majority to an unprecedented eighth term in office, defeating the Labor Party led by Arthur Calwell. (This would be the final lower house election won by Menzies, who would retire from office during the term as the longest-serving Prime Minister in Australian history; he would be replaced by Harold Holt.)

=== December ===
- December 3 – The Warren Commission begins its investigation into the assassination of US President John F. Kennedy.
- December 4 – The second period of the Second Vatican Council closes.
- December 5 – The Seliger Forschungs-und-Entwicklungsgesellschaft mbH demonstrates rockets for military use to military representatives of non-NATO-countries near Cuxhaven. Although these rockets land via parachute at the end of their flight and no allied laws are violated, the Soviet Union protests this action.
- December 7 – The first instant replay system to use videotape instead of film is used by Tony Verna, a CBS-TV director, during a live televised sporting event, the Army–Navy Game of college football played in Philadelphia, United States.
- December 8 – A lightning strike causes the crash of Pan Am Flight 214 near Elkton, Maryland, United States, killing 81 people.
- December 10
  - Zanzibar gains independence from the United Kingdom, as a constitutional monarchy under Sultan Jamshid bin Abdullah.
  - Chuck Yeager narrowly escapes death while testing an NF-104A rocket-augmented aerospace trainer when his aircraft goes out of control at 108,700 feet (nearly 21 miles up) and crashes. He parachutes to safety at 8,500 feet after vainly battling to gain control of the powerless, rapidly falling craft. In this incident he becomes the first pilot to make an emergency ejection in the full pressure suit needed for high altitude flights.
- December 12 – Kenya gains independence from the United Kingdom, with Jomo Kenyatta as prime minister.
- December 20 – The Frankfurt Auschwitz Trials begin.
- December 21 – Cyprus Emergency: Inter-communal fighting erupts between Greek and Turkish Cypriots.
- December 22 – The cruise ship TSMS Lakonia burns 180 miles (290 km) north of Madeira, with the loss of 128 lives.
- December 25 – İsmet İnönü of the Republican People's Party (CHP) forms the new government of Turkey (28th government, coalition partners; independents, İnönü has served ten times as a prime minister, this is his last government).
- December 31 – Federation of Rhodesia and Nyasaland dissolves.

=== Date unknown ===
- David H. Frisch and J.H. Smith prove that the radioactive decay of mesons is slowed by their motion (see Einstein's special relativity and general relativity).
- The TAT-3 transatlantic communications cable goes into operation.
- Ivan Sutherland writes the revolutionary Sketchpad program and runs it on the Lincoln TX-2 computer at Massachusetts Institute of Technology.
- Slavery in Dubai is abolished.
- The IEEE Computer Society is founded.
- Harvey Ball invents the ubiquitous smiley face symbol.
- The classic Porsche 911 is first produced.

== Births ==
=== January ===
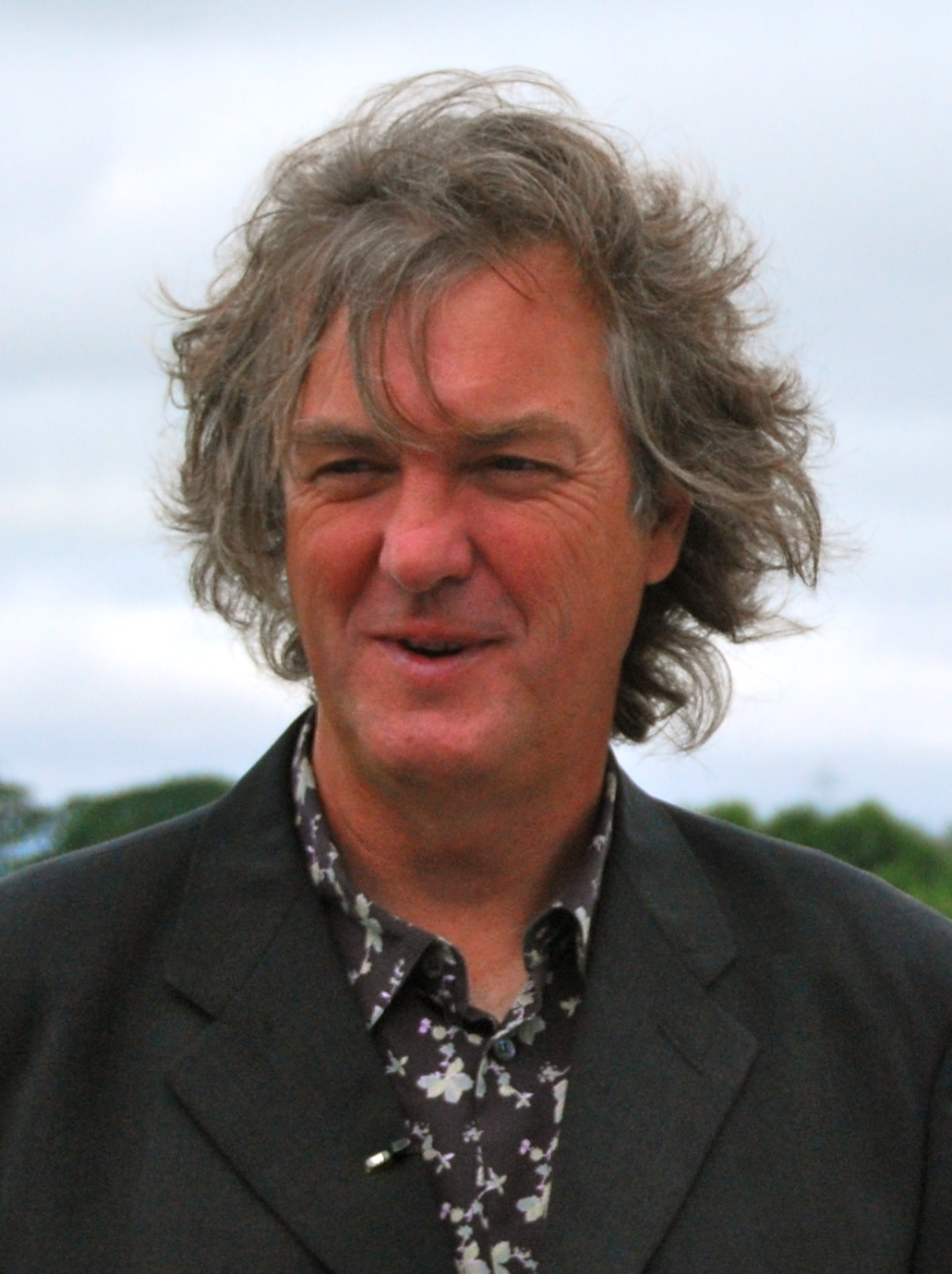
James May

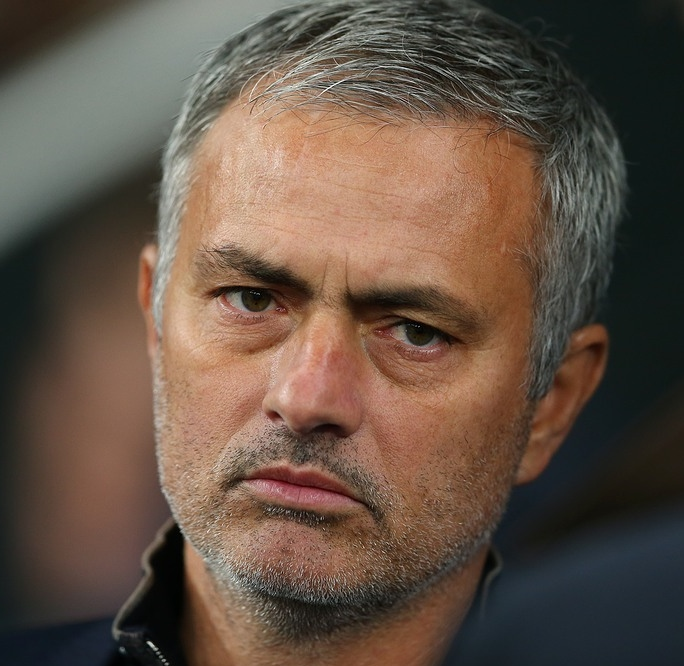
José Mourinho

- January 4
  - Dave Foley, Canadian actor and comedian
  - Till Lindemann, German singer (Rammstein)
- January 5 – Jiang Wen, Chinese actor, film director and screenwriter
- January 6 – Paul Kipkoech, Kenyan long-distance runner (d. 1995)
- January 10 – Kira Ivanova, Soviet Russian figure skater (d. 2001)
- January 11 – Petra Schneider, East German swimmer
- January 14 – Steven Soderbergh, American film director
- January 15 – Bruce Schneier, American cryptographer, cyber security expert and writer
- January 16
  - Simon Johnson, English-born economist
  - James May, English motoring journalist and television show host
- January 17 – Kai Hansen, German power metal guitarist and singer
- January 21 – Hakeem Olajuwon, Nigerian basketball player
- January 22 – Diana Maldonado, American politician, member of the Texas House of Representatives
- January 23 – Gail O'Grady, American actress
- January 25 – Fernando Haddad, Brazilian academic and politician
- January 26
  - José Mourinho, Portuguese football manager
  - Andrew Ridgeley, English pop musician

=== February ===
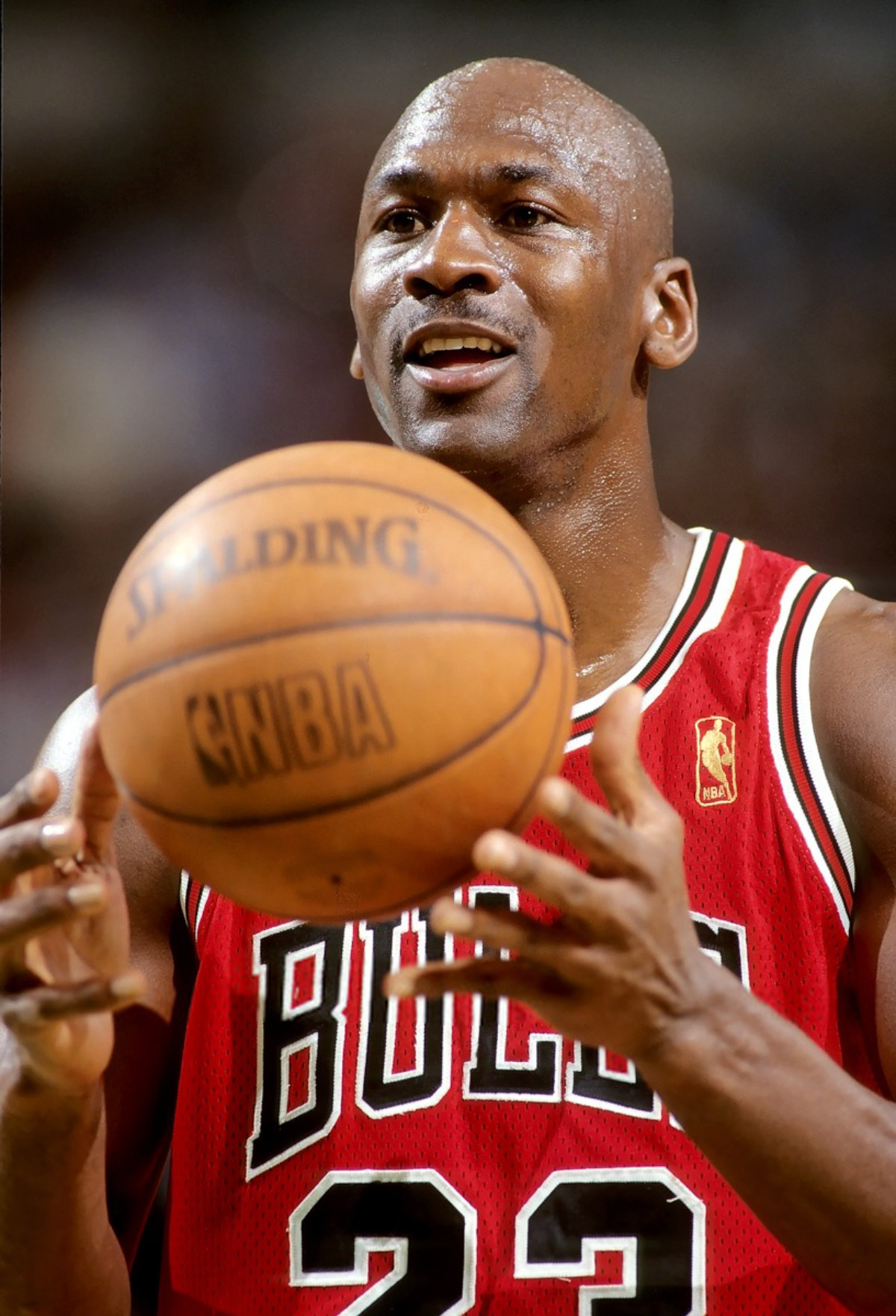
Michael Jordan

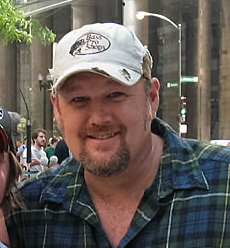
Larry the Cable Guy

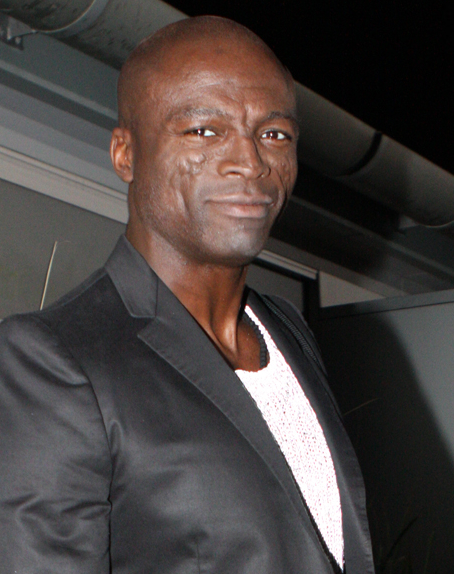
Seal

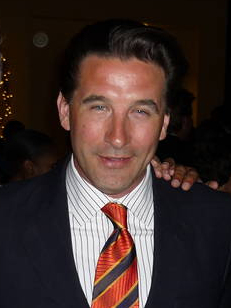
William Baldwin

- February 2
  - Eva Cassidy, American vocalist (d. 1996)
  - Laura L. Lovett, American professor (d. 2025)
- February 3 – Gretel Killeen, Australian journalist
- February 4 – Pirmin Zurbriggen, Swiss alpine skier
- February 6
  - David Capel, English cricketer (d. 2020)
  - Cláudia Ohana, Brazilian actress and singer
- February 12 – John Michael Higgins, American actor and voice actor
- February 14
  - Enrico Colantoni, Canadian actor and director
  - Alex Perry, Australian fashion designer
- February 15 – Shoucheng Zhang, Chinese-American physicist (d. 2018)
- February 16 – Claudio Amendola, Italian actor, television presenter and director
- February 17
  - Michael Jordan, American basketball player
  - Jensen Huang, Taiwanese–American businessman, electrical engineer and philanthropist, co-founder of NVIDIA
  - Larry the Cable Guy, American actor and comedian
- February 18 – Rob Andrew, English rugby union player
- February 19 – Seal, English soul singer
- February 20
  - Charles Barkley, American basketball player
  - Jon Christensen (politician), American politician and member of the US House of Representatives from 1995 to 1999
- February 21 – William Baldwin, American actor, producer and writer
- February 22 – Vijay Singh, Fijian golfer
- February 25 – Merab Katsitadze, retired Georgian professional football player
- February 26 – François Gagnon, Canadian sports journalist
- February 27 – Virginie Boutaud, Brazilian singer and actress (Metrô, Virginie & Fruto Proibido)

=== March ===
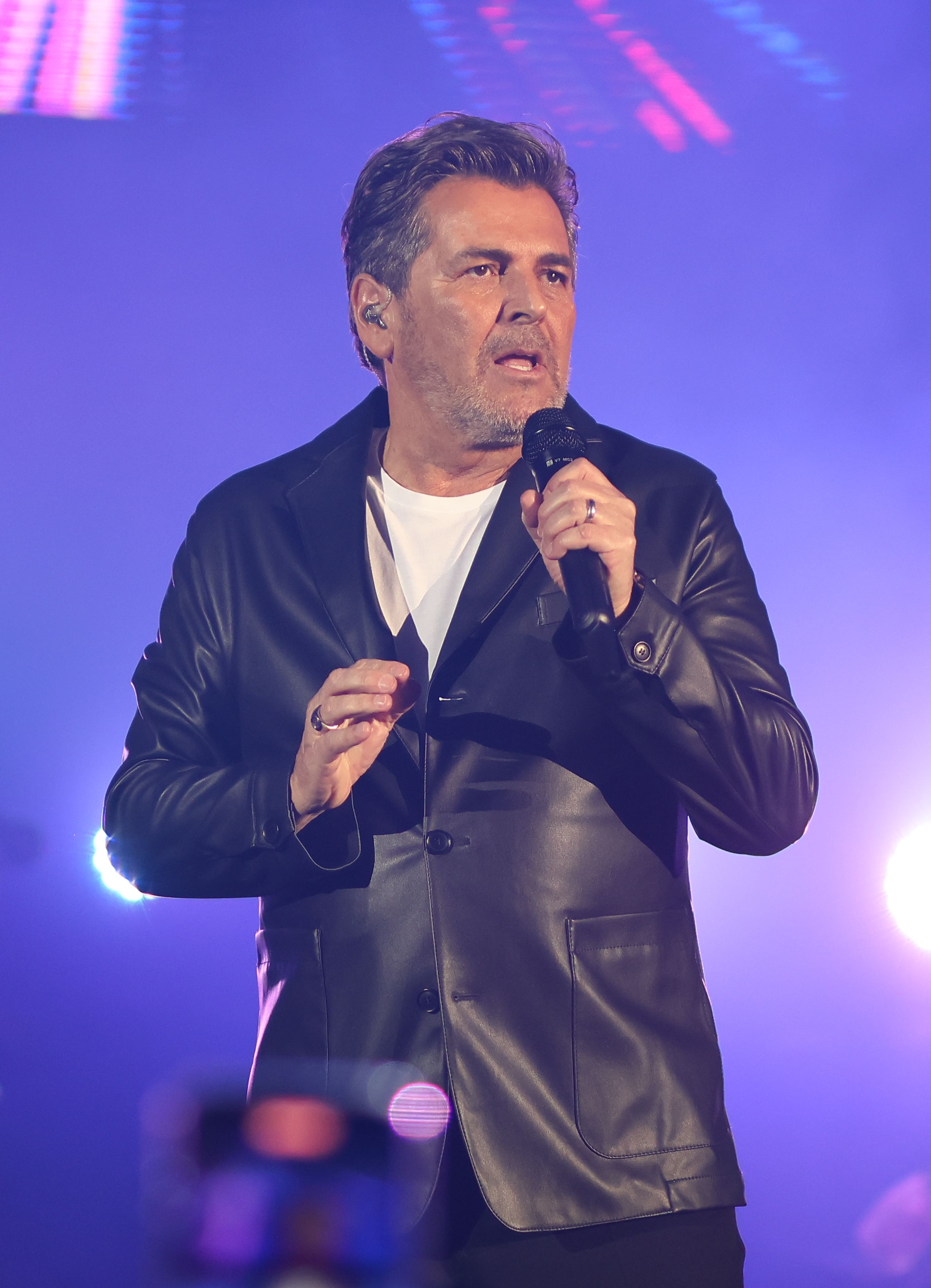
Thomas Anders

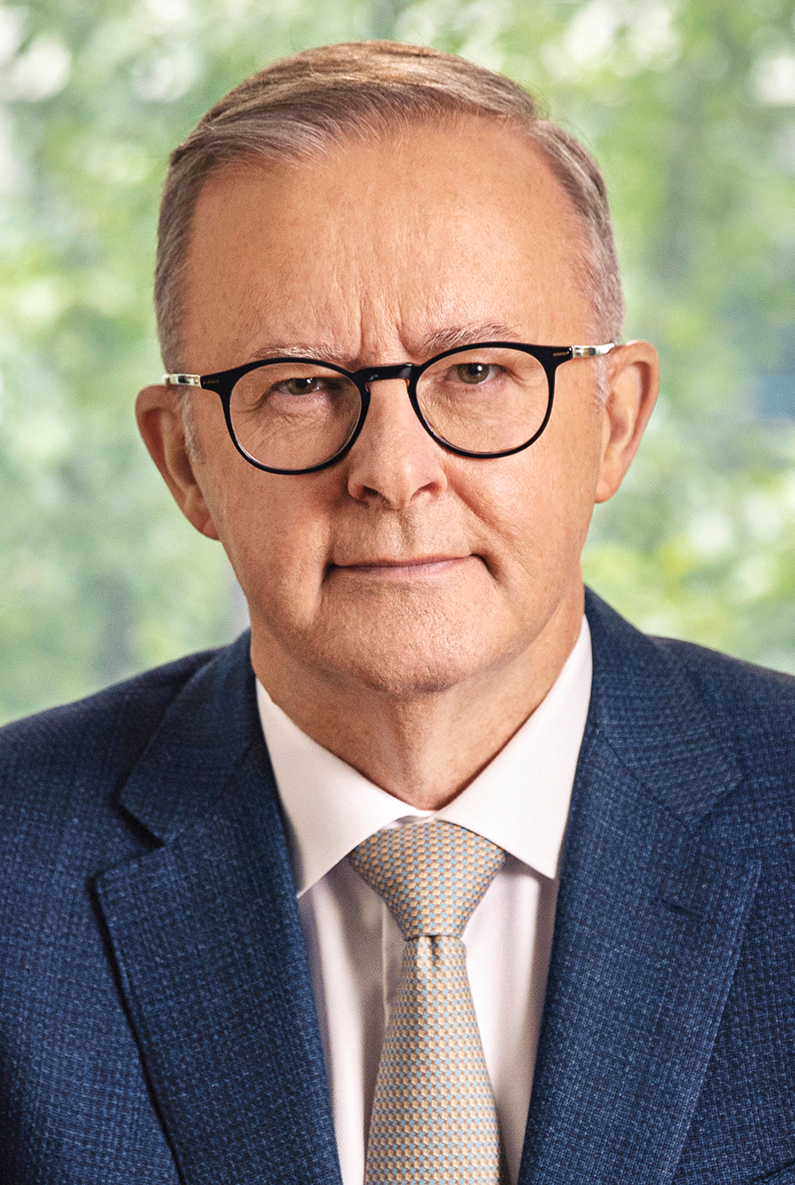
Anthony Albanese

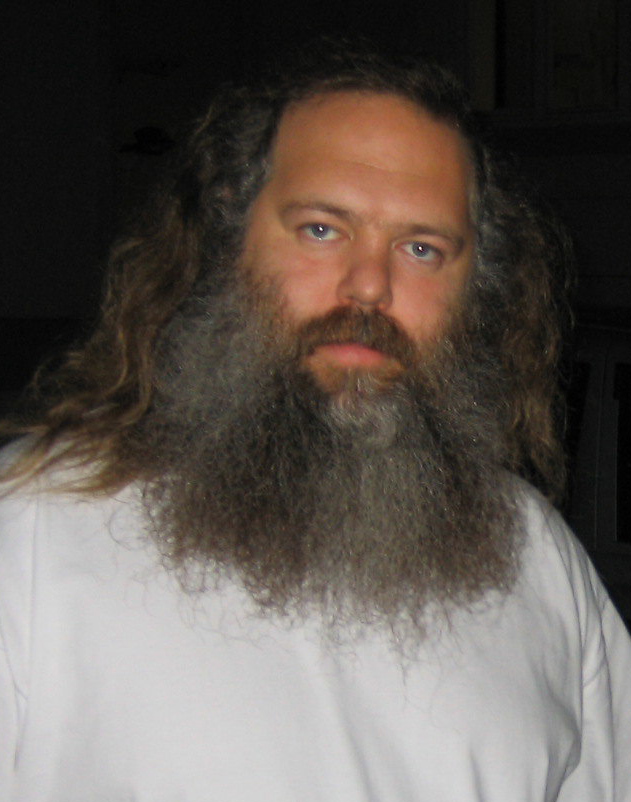
Rick Rubin

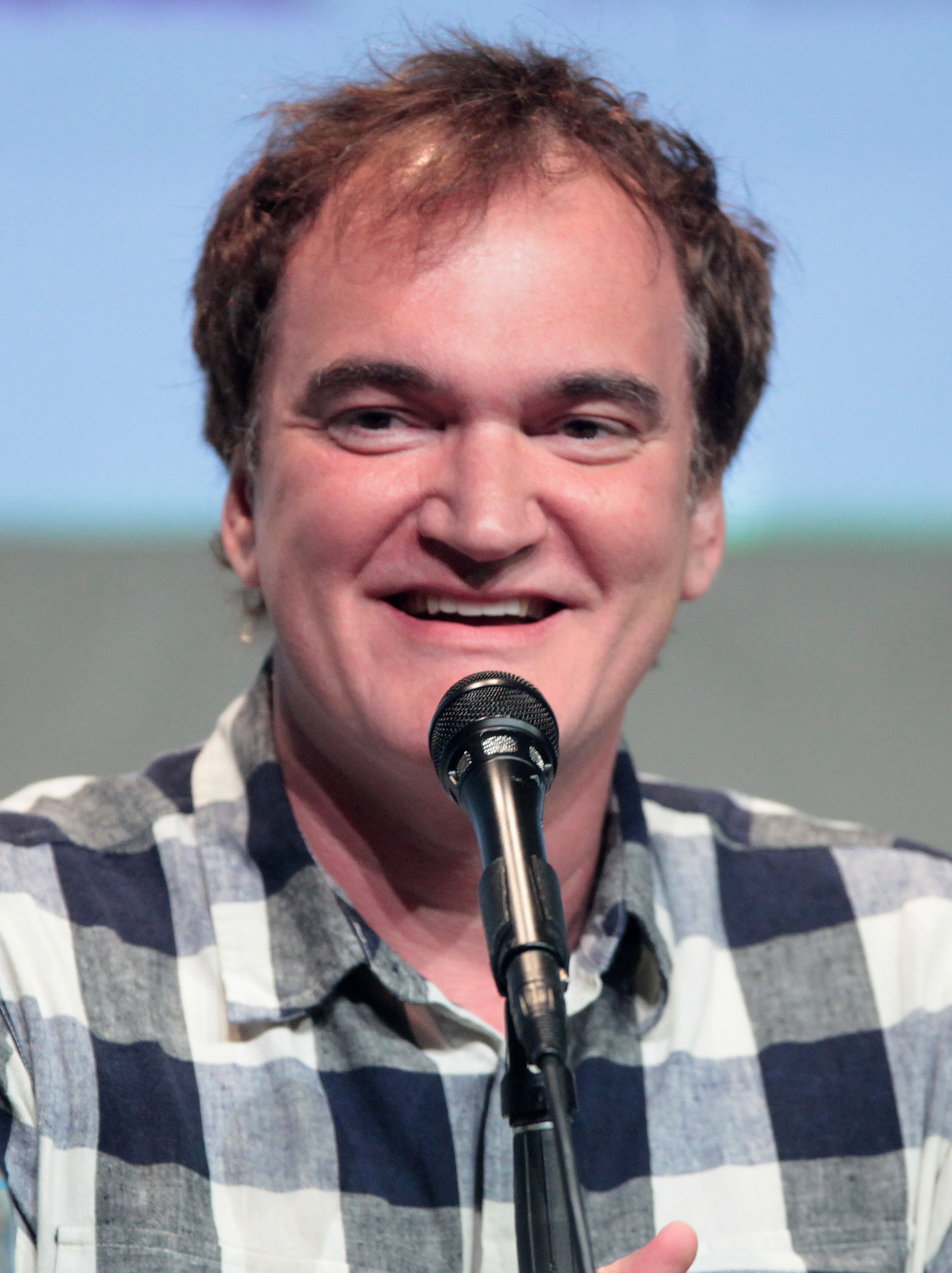
Quentin Tarantino

- March 1
  - Thomas Anders, German singer
  - Aydan Şener, Turkish actress, model and beauty pageant
- March 2
  - Anthony Albanese, 31st Prime Minister of Australia
  - Tuff Hedeman, American PRCA World Champion Bull Rider
- March 3 – Martín Fiz, Spanish long-distance runner
- March 4 – Jason Newsted, American bassist
- March 5 – Joel Osteen, American businessman and television evangelist
- March 8 – Juan Gilberto Funes, Argentine footballer (d. 1992)
- March 9 − Jean-Marc Vallée, Canadian filmmaker and screenwriter (d. 2021)
- March 10
  - Rick Rubin, American music producer
  - Anna Maria Corazza Bildt, Italian politician
- March 11
  - Azem Hajdari, Albanian student leader (d. 1998)
  - Alex Kingston, English actress
  - David LaChapelle, American photographer
- March 12
  - Farahnaz Pahlavi, Iranian princess
  - Jake Weber, British actor
  - Joaquim Cruz, Brazilian runner
- March 13 – Fito Páez, Argentine rock musician
- March 14 – Bruce Reid, Australian cricketer
- March 15 – Bret Michaels, American rock singer (Poison)
- March 16 – Kevin Smith, New Zealand actor (d. 2002)
- March 17 – Alex Fong, Hong Kong actor
- March 18 – Vanessa Williams, American beauty queen, actress and singer
- March 20
  - Kathy Ireland, American actress and model
  - David Thewlis, British actor
- March 21 – Ronald Koeman, Dutch football player and manager
- March 22
  - Marty Natalegawa, Indonesian diplomat
  - Ana Fidelia Quirot, Cuban middle-distance runner
  - Martín Vizcarra, Peruvian engineer and politician, 67th President of Peru
- March 23 – Jose Miguel Gonzalez Martin del Campo, Spanish football player
- March 25 – Auxillia Mnangagwa, Zimbabwean politician and First Lady of Zimbabwe
- March 27
  - Dave Koz, American jazz musician
  - Quentin Tarantino, American actor, director, writer and producer
  - Xuxa, Brazilian television personality
- March 28 – Bernice King, American activist, lawyer and minister
- March 30 – Panagiotis Tsalouchidis, Greek footballer
- March 31 – Stephen Tataw, Cameroonian footballer (d. 2020)

=== April ===
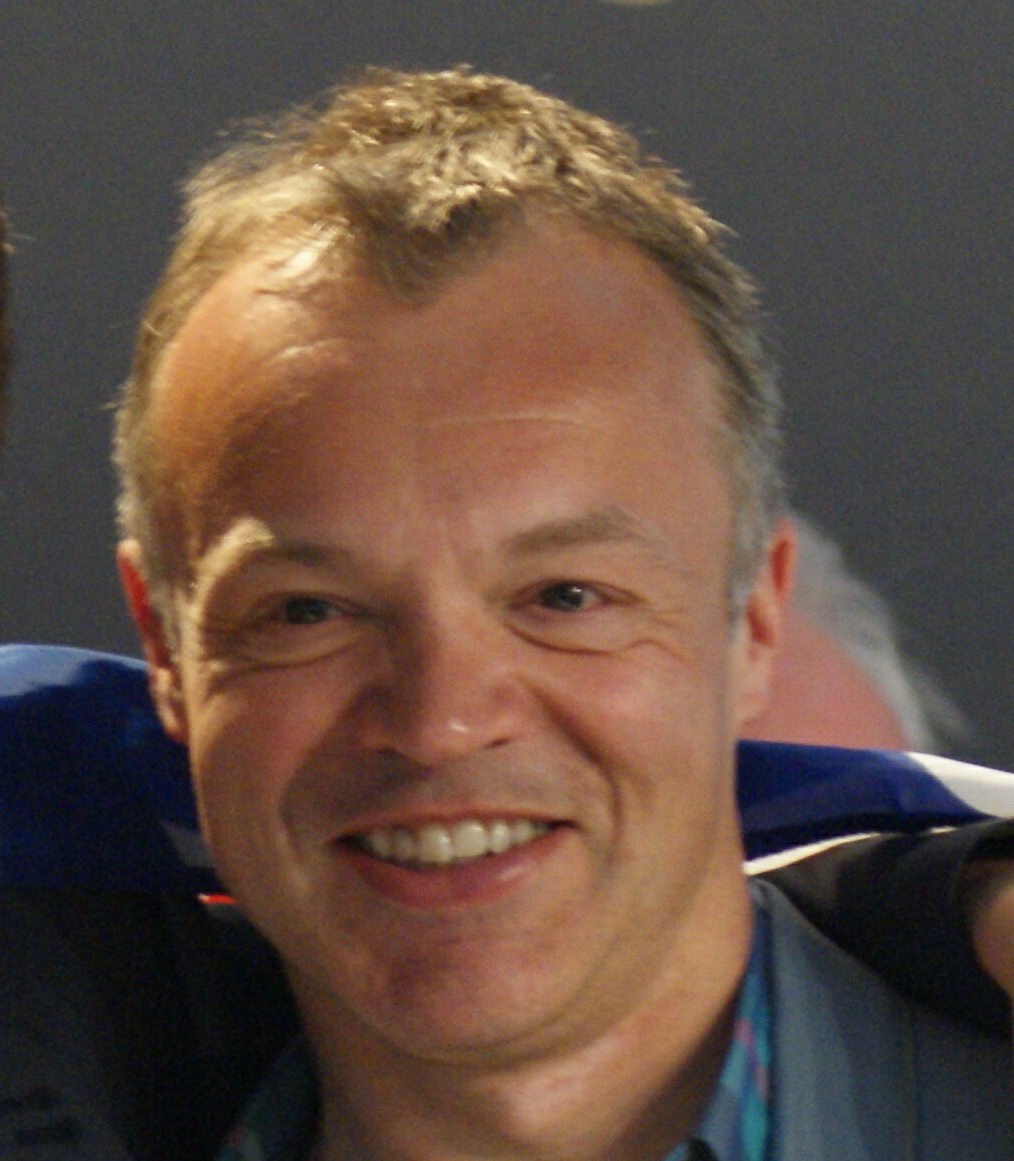
Graham Norton

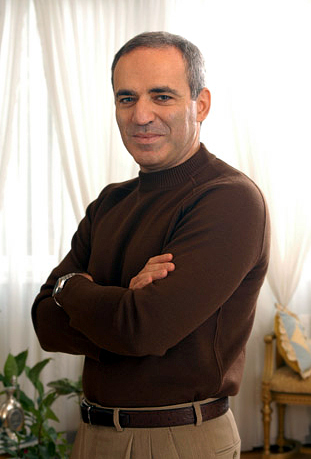
Garry Kasparov

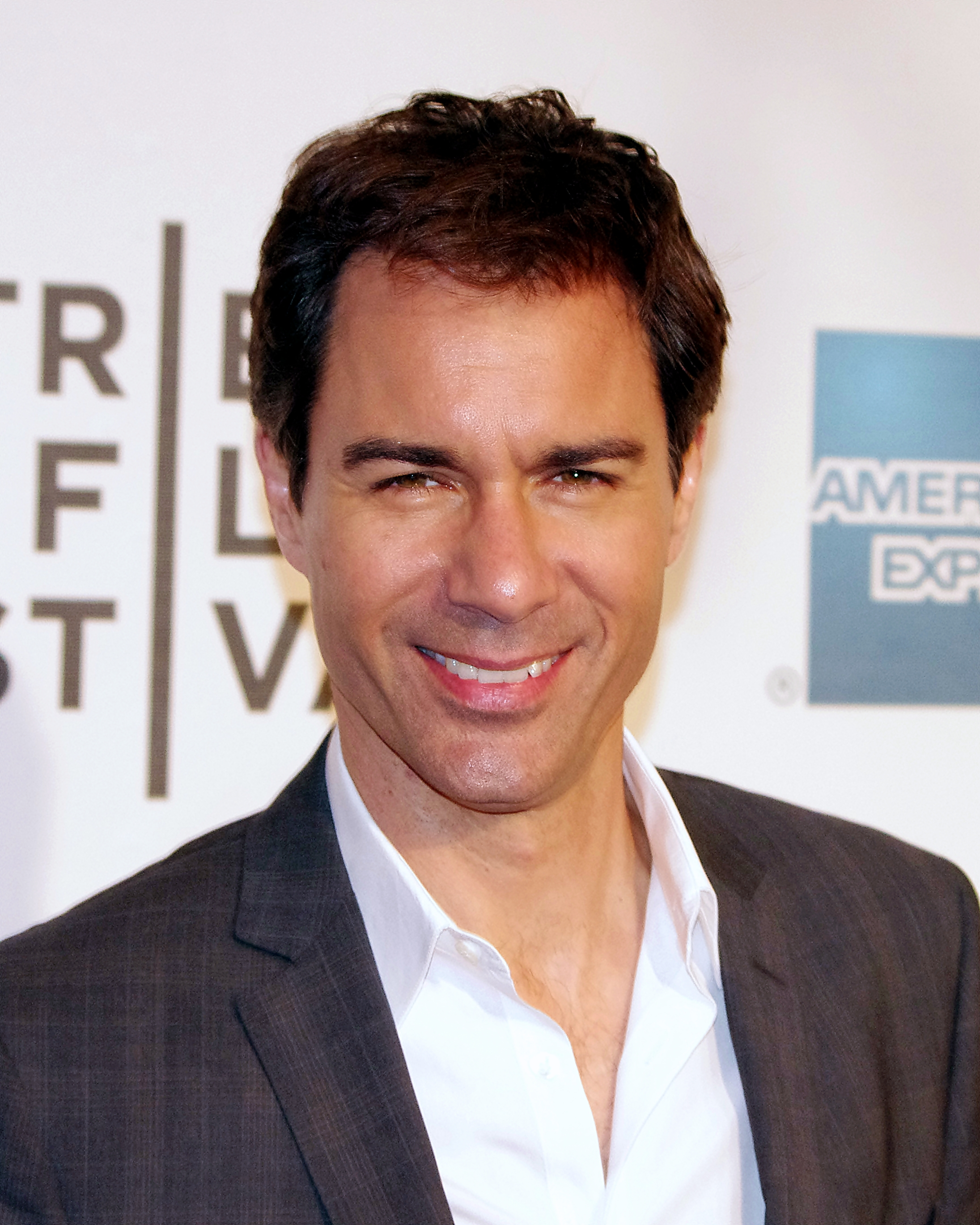
Eric McCormack

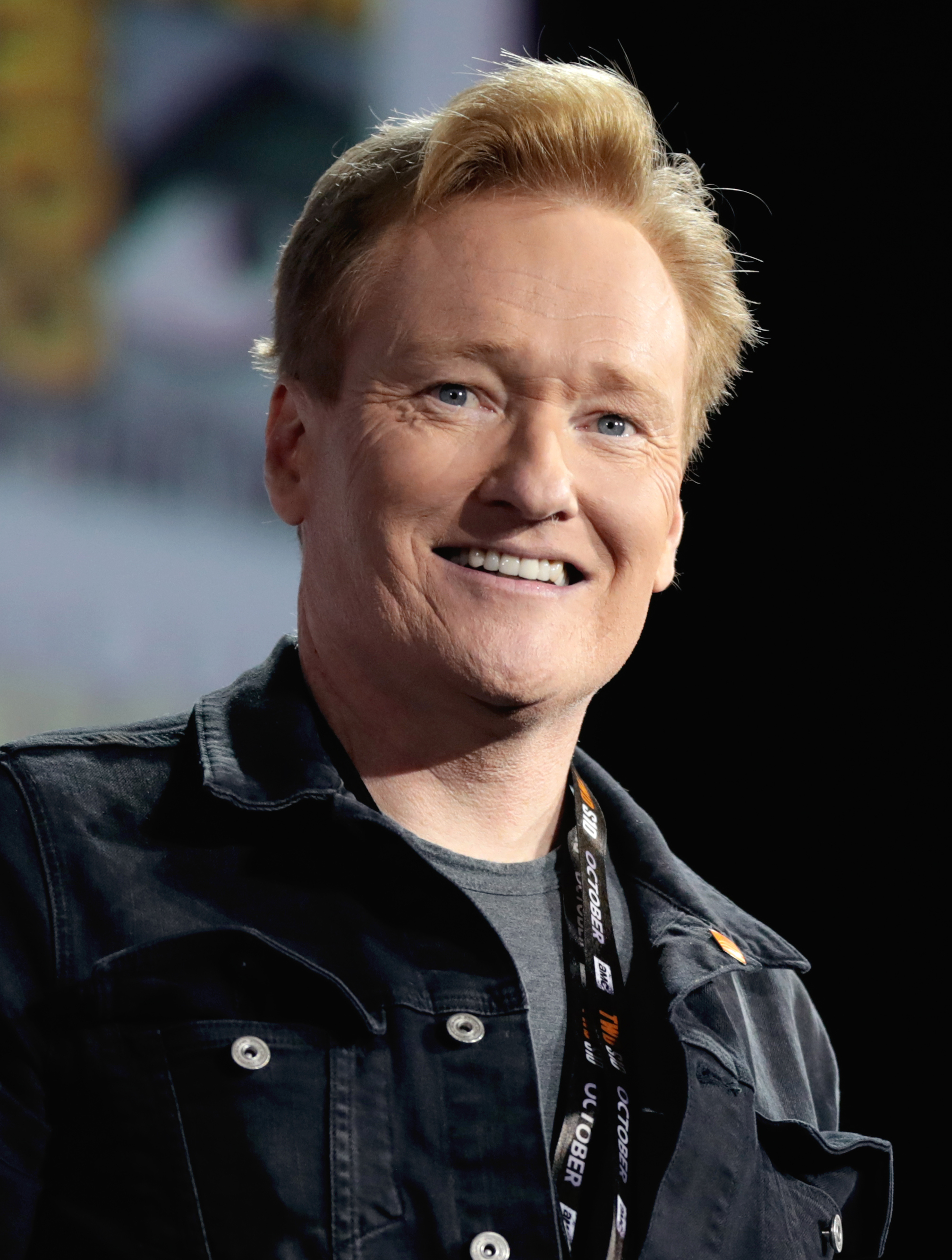
Conan O'Brien

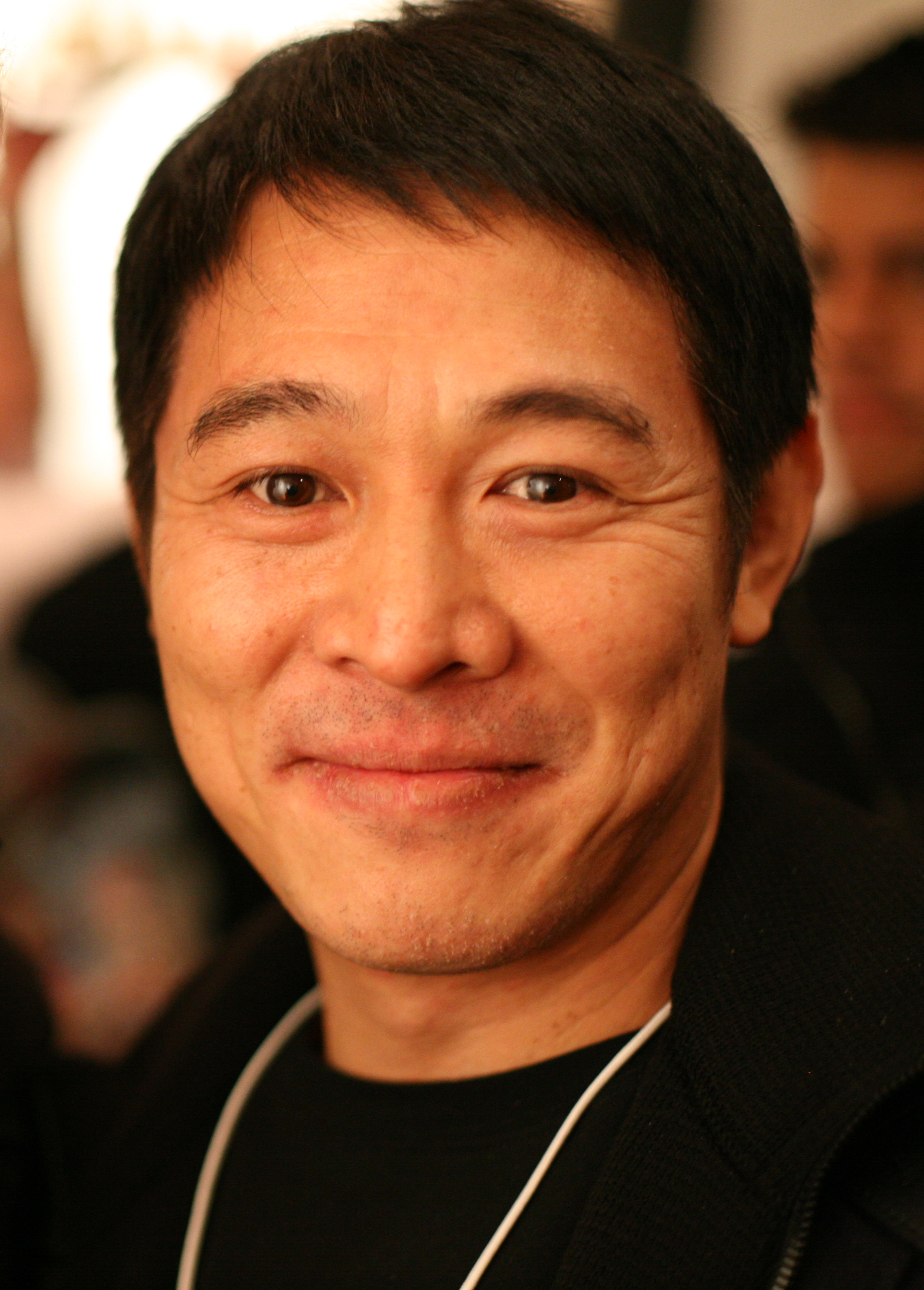
Jet Li

- April 3 – Sarah Woodward, English actress
- April 4
  - Siraj Raisani, Pakistani politician (d. 2018)
  - Dale Hawerchuk, Canadian ice hockey player (d. 2020)
  - Graham Norton, Irish comedian and talk show host
  - Frank Yallop, Canadian soccer player and coach
- April 6 – Rafael Correa, President of Ecuador
- April 8 – Dean Norris, American actor
- April 9
  - Marc Jacobs, American fashion designer
  - Erdal Tosun, Turkish actor (d. 2016)
- April 10
  - Jean-Luc Bourgeaux, French politician
  - Angela Hohmann, German politician
  - Doris Leuthard, Swiss politician and lawyer
- April 11 – Mavis Agbandje-McKenna, Nigerian-born British biophysicist and virologist (d. 2021)
- April 13 – Garry Kasparov, Russian chess player
- April 15
  - Beata Szydło, Prime Minister of Poland
  - Diosdado Cabello, Venezuelan politician
  - Raul Villanueva, Filipino associate justice of the Supreme Court
- April 16 – Jimmy Osmond, American pop singer
- April 18
  - Universo 2000, Mexican professional wrestler (d. 2018)
  - Mike Mangini, American drummer
  - Eric McCormack, Canadian actor
  - Conan O'Brien, American television entertainer and talk show host
- April 21 – Roy Dupuis, Canadian actor
- April 22 – Blanca Fernández Ochoa, Spanish ski racer (d. 2019)
- April 23 – Mohammad Ali Ramazani Dastak, Iranian politician (d. 2020)
- April 24 – Tõnu Trubetsky, Estonian punk rock musician
- April 26 – Jet Li, Chinese martial artist and actor
- April 27 – Russell T Davies, Welsh television producer and writer
- April 28 – Jim Aldred, Canadian ice hockey coach and player
- April 29 – Mike Babcock, Canadian ice hockey coach
- April 30 – Michael Waltrip, American race car driver and sportscaster

=== May ===
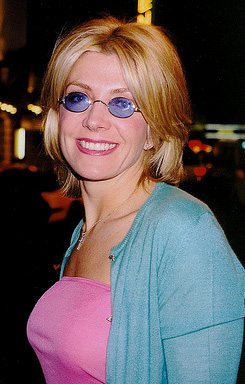
Natasha Richardson

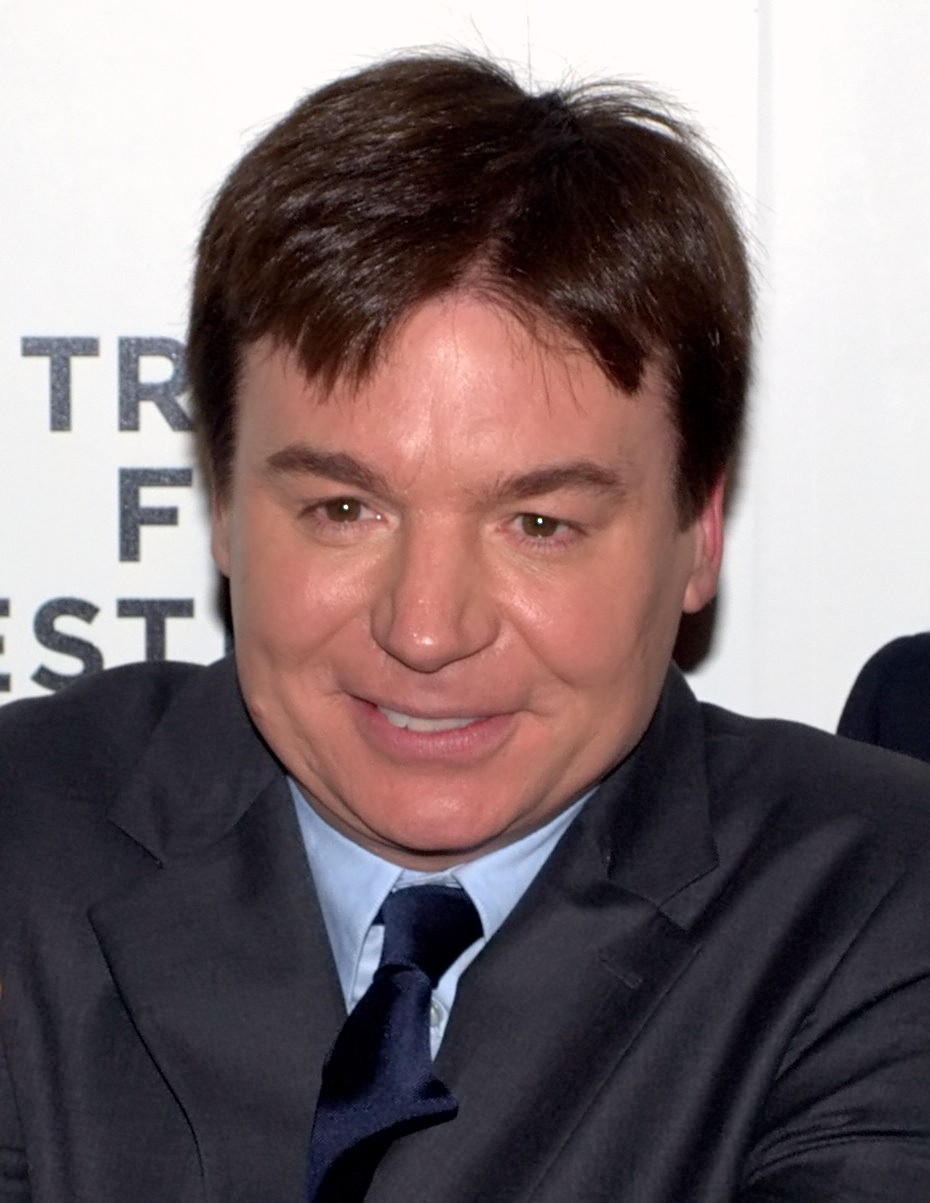
Mike Myers

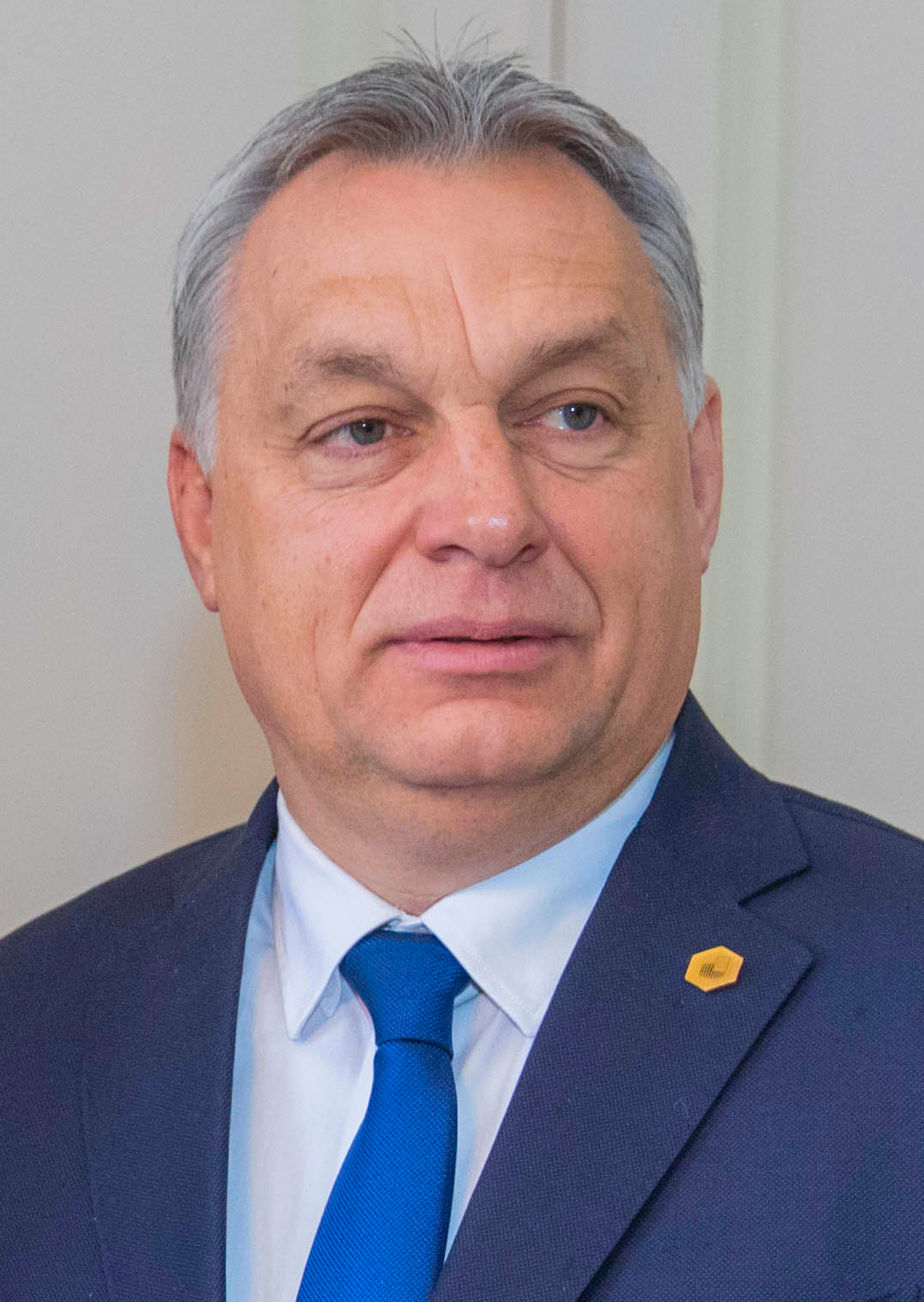
Viktor Orbán

- May 8 – Anthony Field, Australian singer, musician and actor (The Wiggles)
- May 9 – Gary Daniels, British martial artist and actor
- May 10
  - Rich Moore, American film and television animation director, screenwriter and voice actor
  - Lisa Nowak, American naval flight officer and NASA astronaut
- May 11 – Natasha Richardson, British-American actress (d. 2009)
- May 16 – Mercedes Echerer, Austrian actress and politician
- May 21 – Kevin Shields, Irish-American singer (My Bloody Valentine)
- May 24
  - Michael Chabon, American fiction writer
  - Joe Dumars, American basketball player
- May 25
  - Mike Myers, Canadian actor and comedian
  - Eha Rünne, Estonian shot putter and discus thrower
- May 26
  - Clive Cowdery, English insurance entrepreneur
  - Musetta Vander, South African actress
  - Phil Pavlov, American politician and member of the Michigan Legislature from 2005 to 2018
- May 29 – Débora Bloch, Brazilian actress
- May 31 – Viktor Orbán, Prime Minister of Hungary

=== June ===
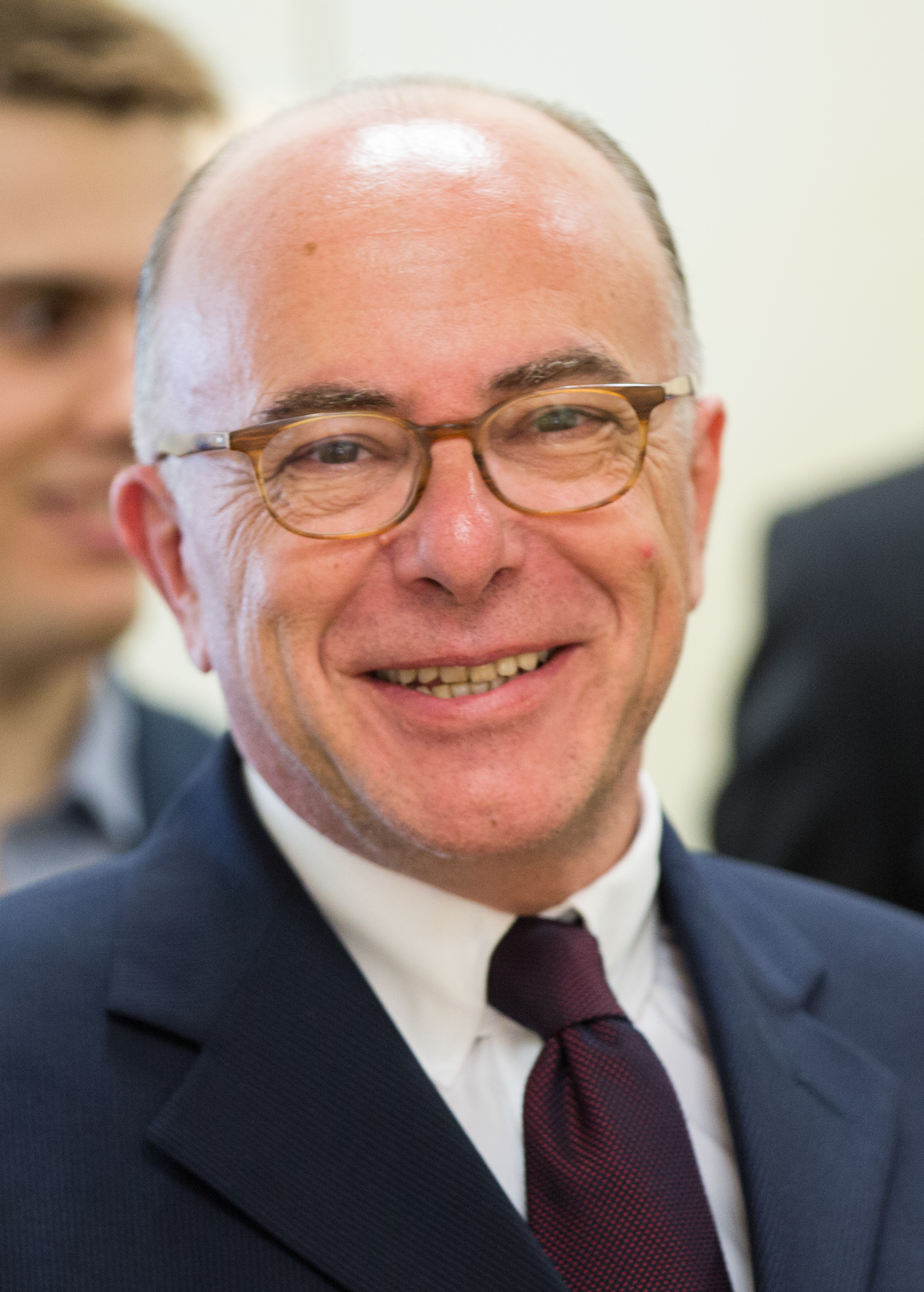
Bernard Cazeneuve

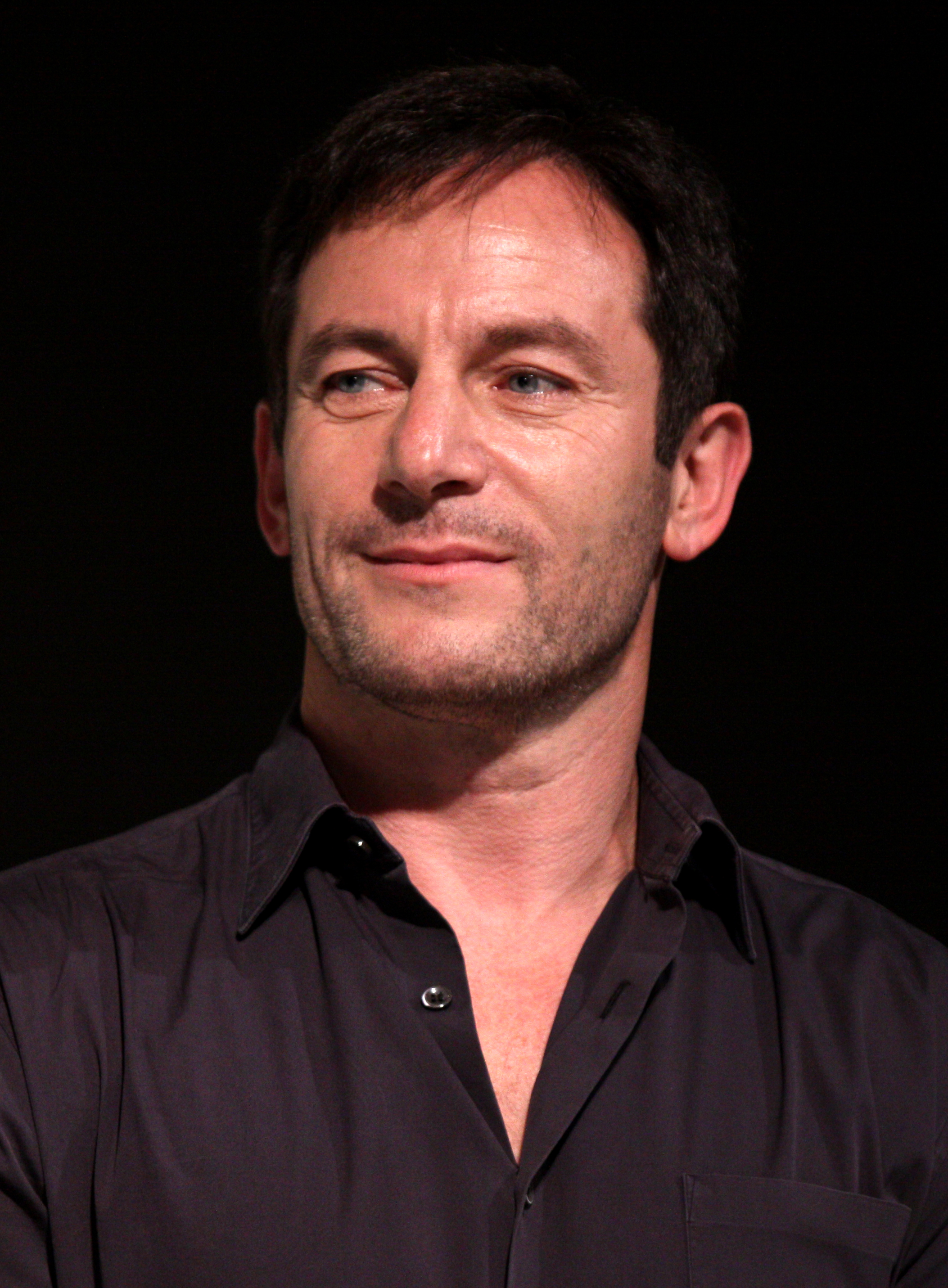
Jason Isaacs

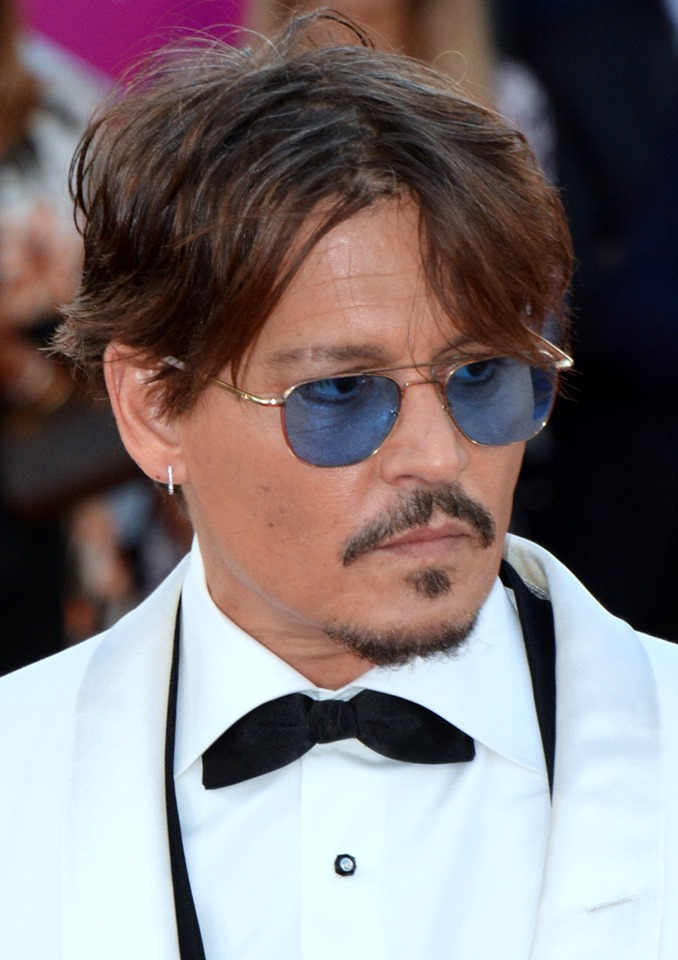
Johnny Depp

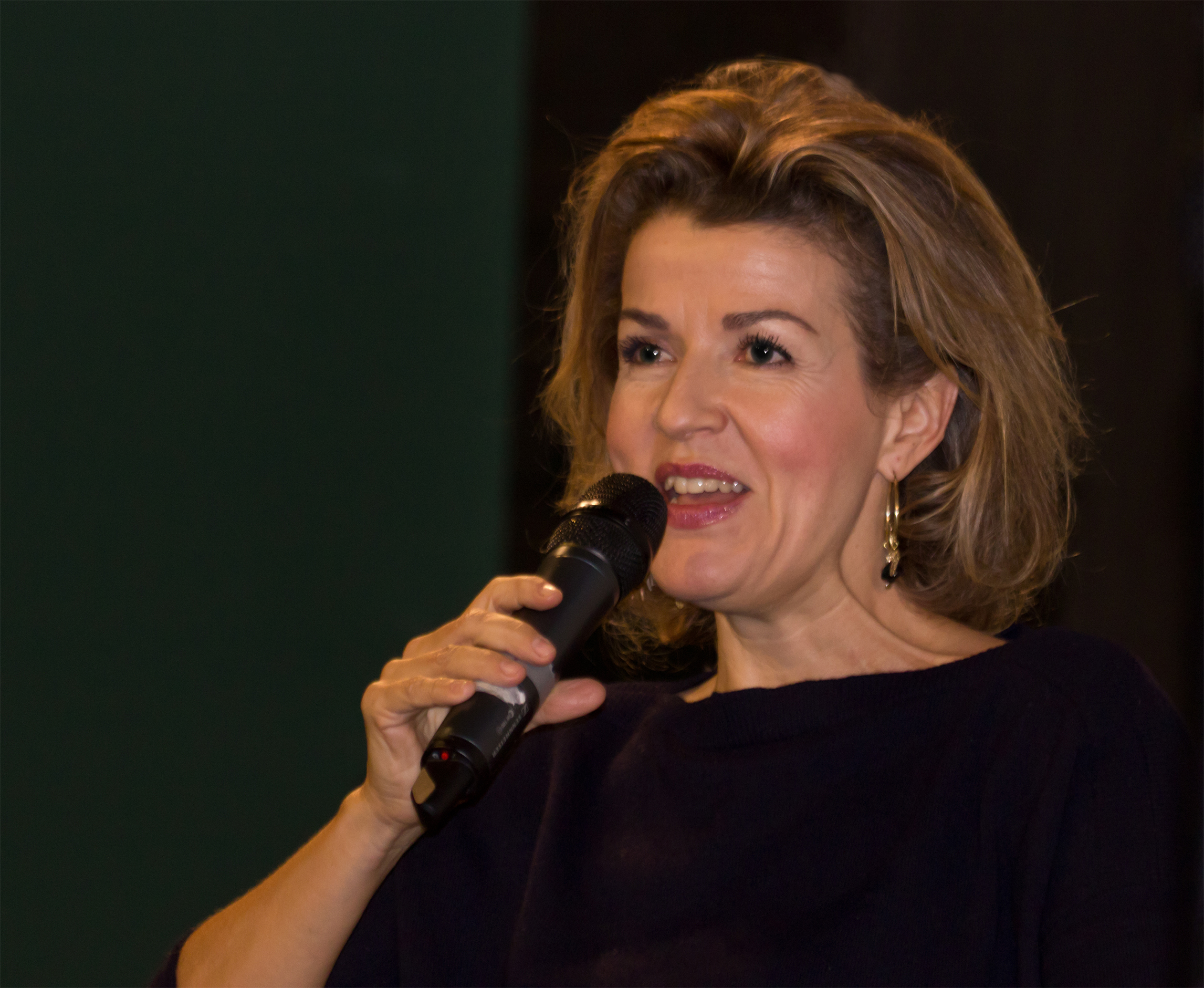
Anne-Sophie Mutter

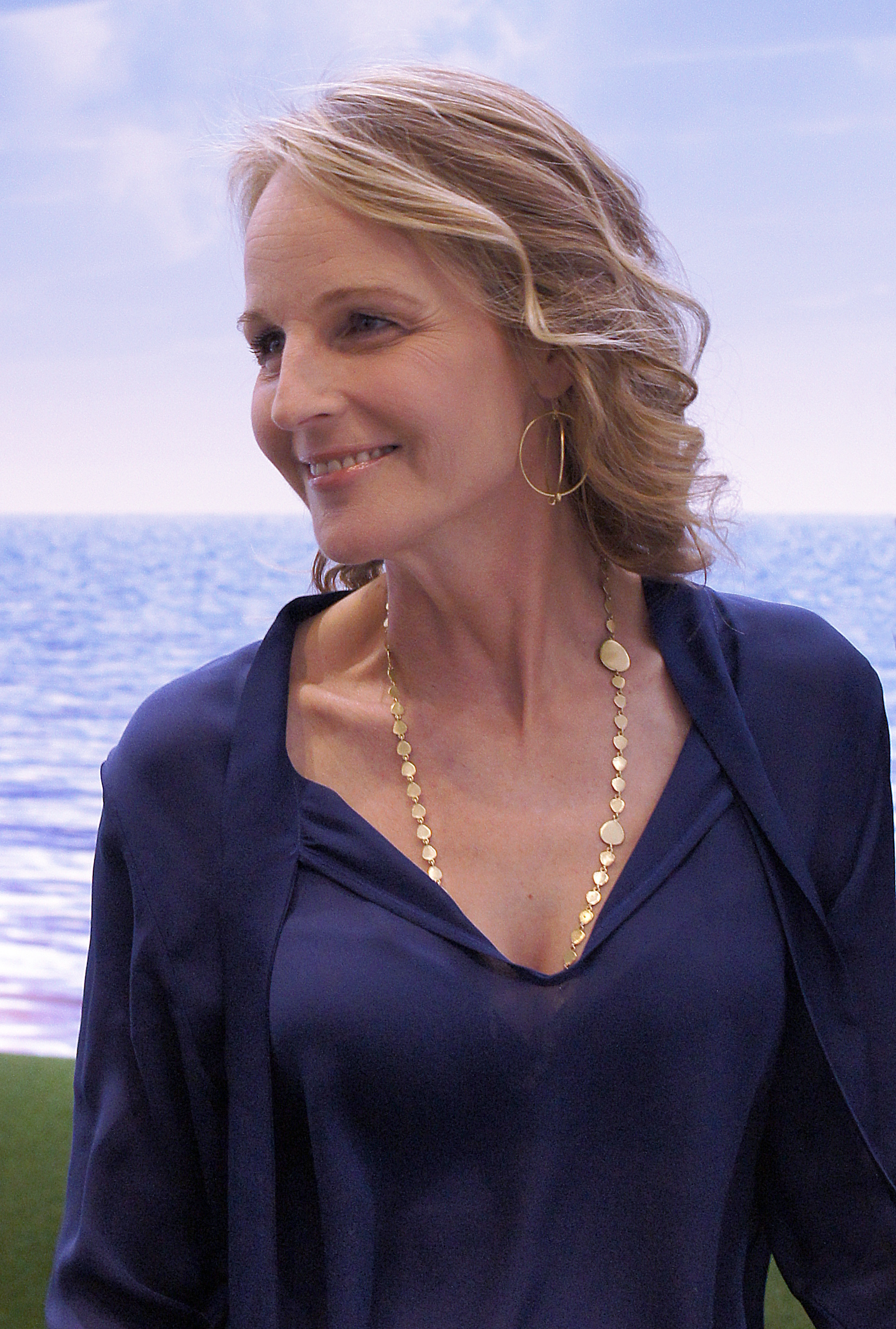
Helen Hunt

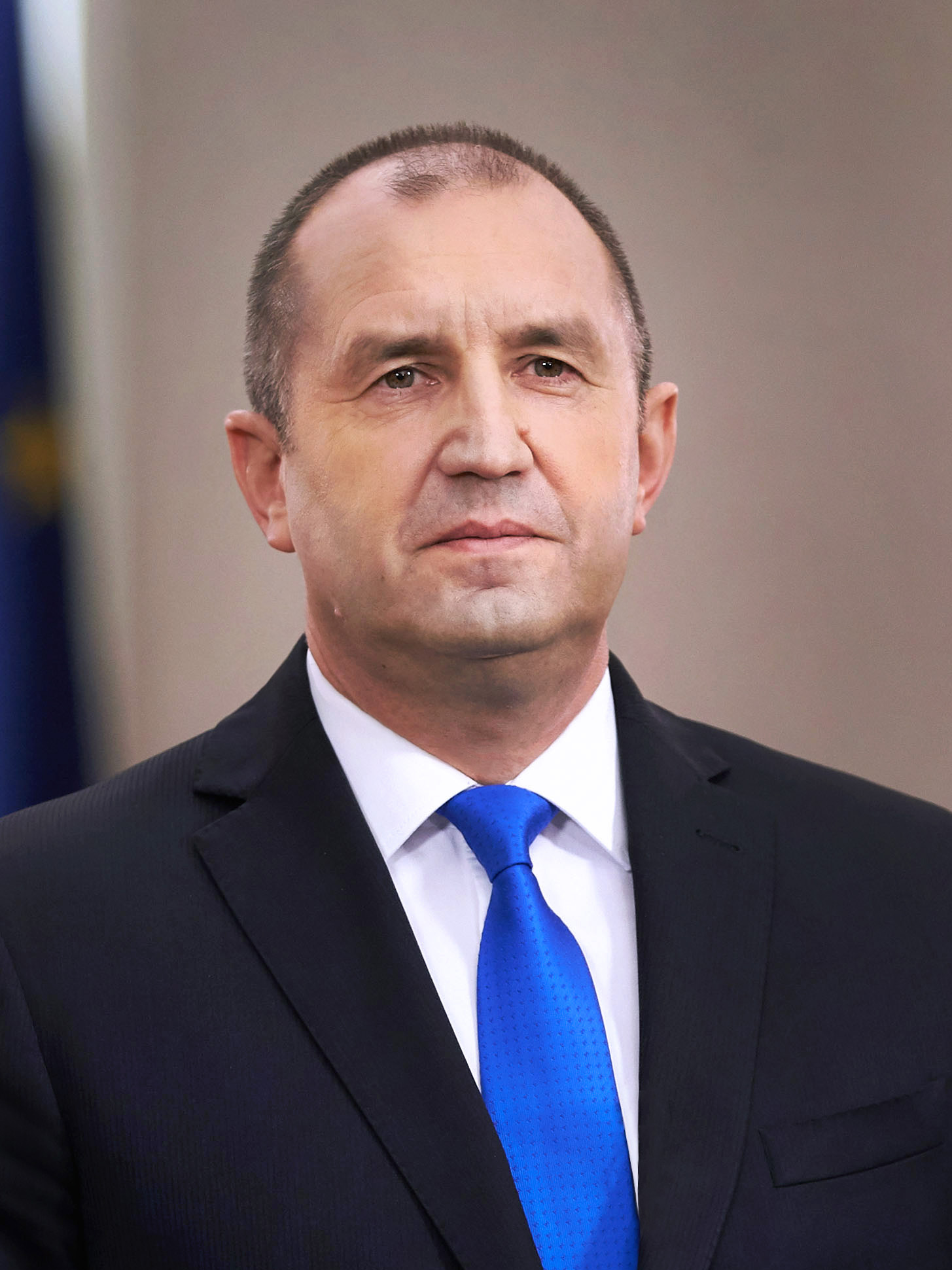
Rumen Radev

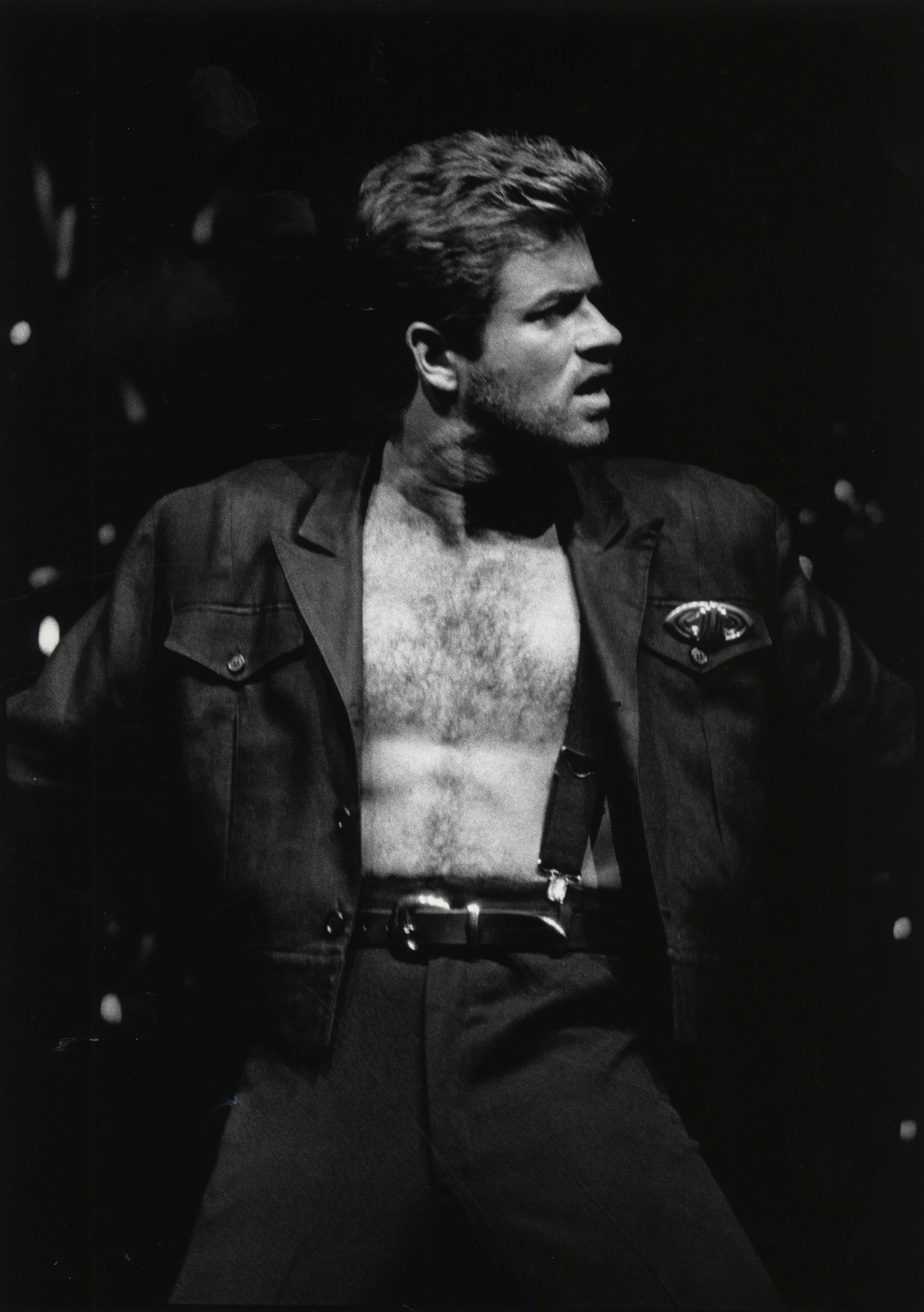
George Michael

- June 2 – Bernard Cazeneuve, Prime Minister of France
- June 3
  - Alessandra Karpoff, Italian voice actress
  - Andrée Taurinya, French politician
- June 4 – Sean Fitzpatrick, New Zealand rugby union player
- June 5 – Joe Rudán, Hungarian heavy metal singer
- June 6 – Jason Isaacs, British actor
- June 9 – Johnny Depp, American actor and film director
- June 10 – Jeanne Tripplehorn, American actress
- June 12
  - Warwick Capper, Australian rules footballer
  - T. B. Joshua, Nigerian Christian leader (d. 2021)
- June 13 – Bettina Bunge, German tennis player
- June 14 – Rambo Amadeus, Montenegrin singer-songwriter
- June 15
  - Helen Hunt, American actress
  - Lourdes Valera, Venezuelan actress
- June 17 – Greg Kinnear, American actor
- June 18 – Rumen Radev, President of Bulgaria
- June 19 – Laura Ingraham, American television host
- June 21
  - Tiger Huang, Taiwanese popular singer
  - Jan Pinkava, Czech director and writer
- June 22
  - Randy Couture, American mixed martial arts fighter and actor
  - Hokutoumi Nobuyoshi, Japanese sumo wrestler
  - John Tenta, Canadian wrestler (d. 2006)
- June 23
  - Marianne Berglund, Swedish road racing cyclist
  - Shin Ji-ho, South Korean politician
  - Liu Cixin, Chinese science fiction writer
  - Márcio França, Brazilian lawyer and politician
  - Colin Montgomerie, Scottish golfer
- June 24 – Sükhbaataryn Batbold, Mongolian politician
- June 25
  - Yann Martel, Canadian novelist
  - George Michael, British singer-songwriter (d. 2016)
- June 26
  - Mikhail Khodorkovsky, Russian businessman, activist and oligarch
  - Farukh Ruzimatov, Russian ballet dancer
- June 28 – Wisit Sasanatieng, Thai film director and screenwriter
- June 29
  - Anne-Sophie Mutter, German violinist
  - Rupert Graves, English actor
  - Judith Hoag, American actress
- June 30
  - Vladimir Vermezović, Serbian football player and coach
  - Yngwie Malmsteen, Swedish guitarist

=== July ===
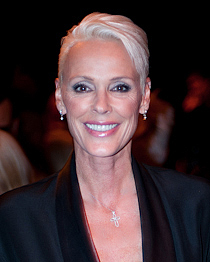
Brigitte Nielsen

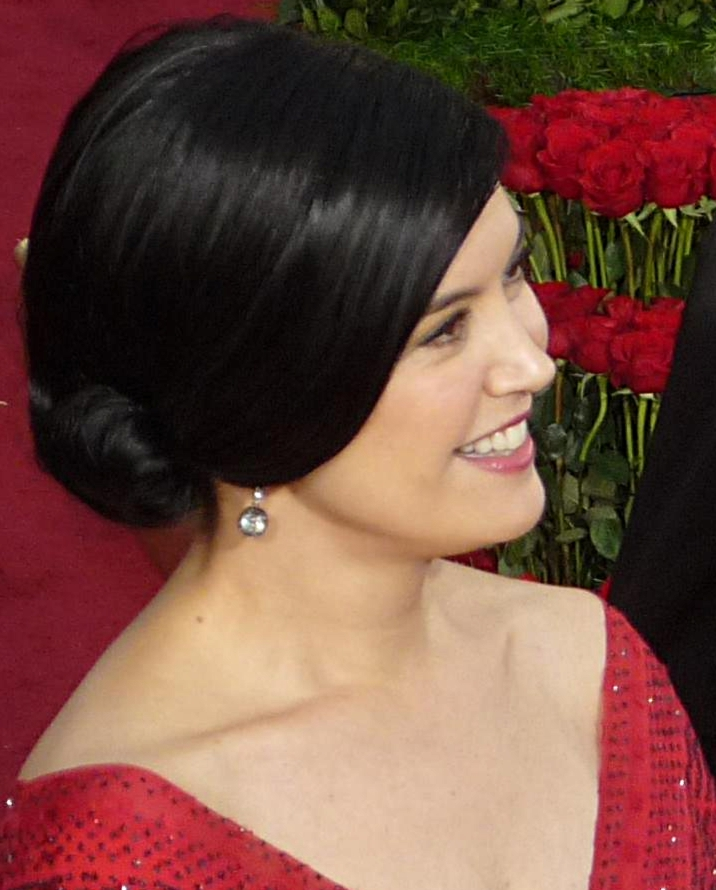
Phoebe Cates

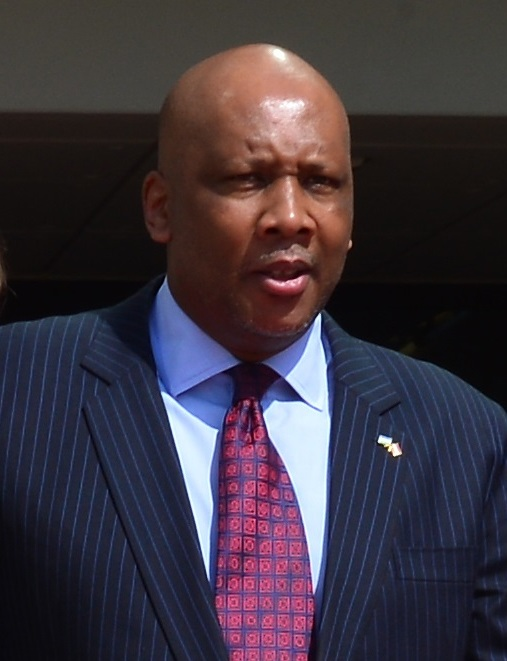
Letsie III of Lesotho

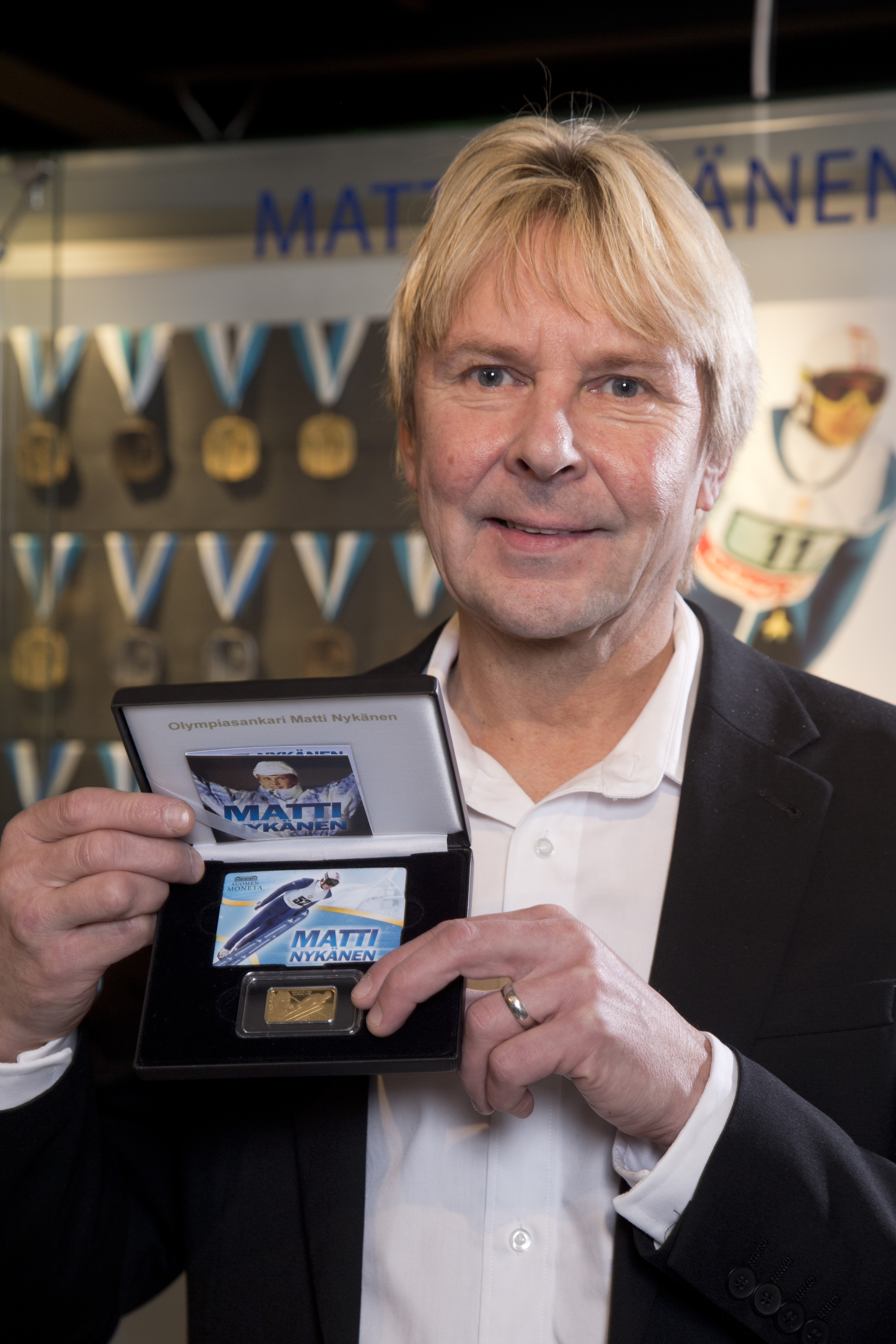
Matti Nykänen

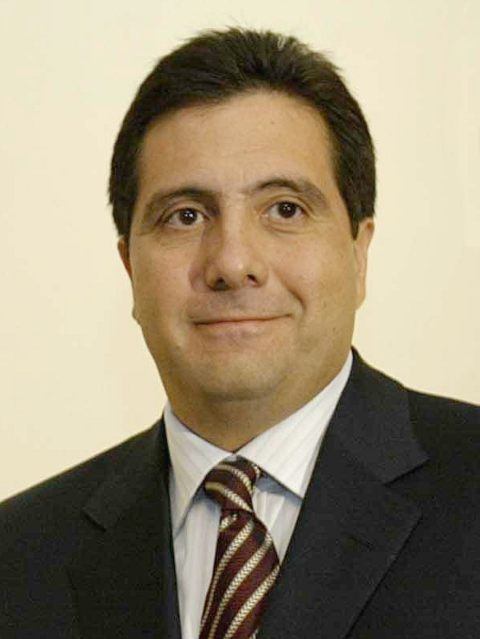
Martín Torrijos

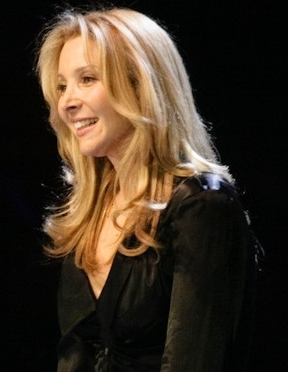
Lisa Kudrow

- July 1
  - Naser Khader, Danish-Syrian politician
  - Igor Zhelezovski, Belarusian speed skater
  - Zhang Zhicheng, Chinese fencer
  - Roddy Bottum, American musician, keyboardist for the band Faith No More
- July 2 – Faiq Al Sheikh Ali, Iraqi lawyer and politician
- July 3 – Zainudin Nordin, Singaporean politician
- July 4
  - Henri Leconte, French tennis player
  - R.S. Thanenthiran, Malaysian politician and businessman
  - Michael Sweet, American singer and guitarist, lead singer of the Christian band Stryper
- July 5
  - Edie Falco, American actress
  - Zbigniew Hoffmann, Polish politician
- July 6 – Sorin Matei, Romanian high jumper
- July 7
  - Vonda Shepard, American pop/rock singer-songwriter and actress
  - Fermín Alvarado Arroyo, Mexican politician
  - Janni Larsen, Danish female darts player
  - Rakeysh Omprakash Mehra, Indian filmmaker and screenwriter
- July 8
  - Michael Cuesta, American film and television director
  - Luis de Jesús Rodríguez, Dominican attorney, businessman and entrepreneur
  - Dmitry Pevtsov, Russian actor
- July 10
  - Fatemeh Goudarzi, Iranian actress
  - Ian Lougher, British motorcycle racer
- July 11
  - Al MacInnis, Canadian ice hockey player
  - Manuel Marrero Cruz, Cuban politician; Prime Minister of Cuba
  - Lisa Rinna, American actress
- July 12
  - Bertus Servaas, Polish entrepreneur
  - Aleksandr Domogarov, Russian actor
  - Andrés Roemer, Mexican diplomat
- July 13
  - Kenny Johnson, American actor, producer and model
  - Spud Webb, American basketball player
- July 14 – Wouter Bos, Dutch politician
- July 15 – Brigitte Nielsen, Danish actress
- July 16
  - Phoebe Cates, American actress
  - Mikael Pernfors, Swedish tennis player
  - Srečko Katanec, Slovenian football manager and player
- July 17
  - Suha Arafat, widow of Yasser Arafat
  - King Letsie III of Lesotho
  - Matti Nykänen, Finnish ski jumper (d. 2019)
- July 18 – Martín Torrijos, President of Panama
- July 19 – Sándor Wladár, Hungarian swimmer
- July 20
  - Alexander Zhulin, Russian ice dancing coach and competitor
  - Gbenga Aluko, Nigerian politician
  - Roy Cheung, Hong Kong actor
- July 21 – Giant Silva, Brazilian national basketball player, mixed martial artist and professional wrestler
- July 22
  - Joanna Going, American actress
  - Emilio Butragueño, Spanish football player
- July 23 – Slobodan Živojinović, Serbian tennis player
- July 24 – Karl Malone, American professional basketball player
- July 27 – Donnie Yen, Hong Kong actor and martial artist
- July 28 – Beverley Craven, British singer-songwriter
- July 29
  - Jim Beglin, Irish football commentator
  - Alexandra Paul, American actress, activist and health coach, previously model
- July 30
  - Lisa Kudrow, American actress
  - Antoni Martí, prime minister of Andorra (d. 2023)
  - Chris Mullin, American basketball player, coach and executive
  - Gisèle Meygret, French fencer (d. 1999)
  - Mandakini, Indian Bollywood actress
- July 31
  - Fatboy Slim, English DJ, musician and record producer
  - Martin H. Wiggers, German economist, editor, author and businessman

=== August ===
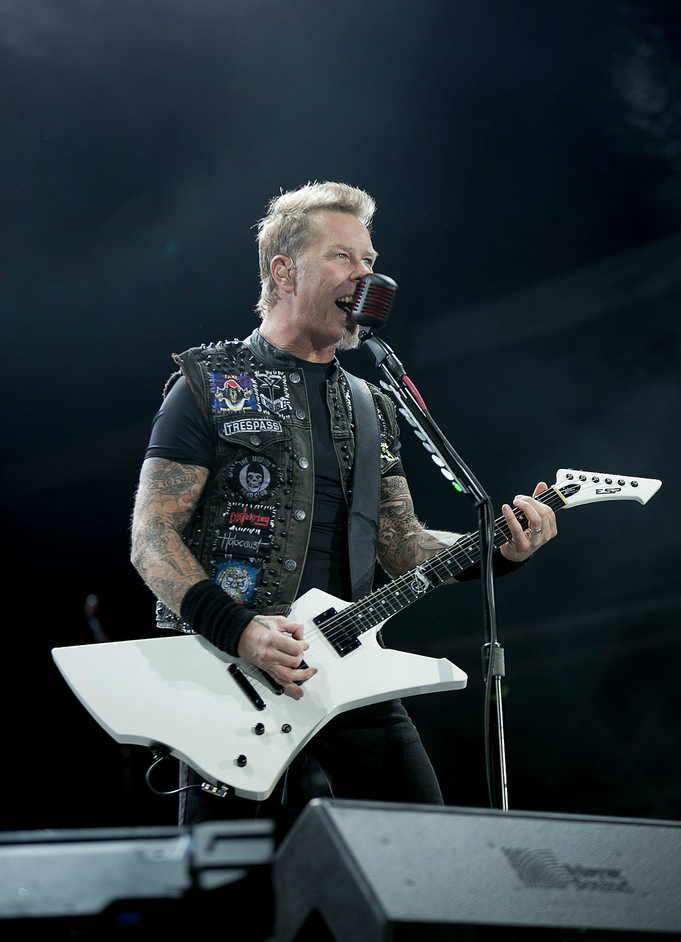
James Hetfield

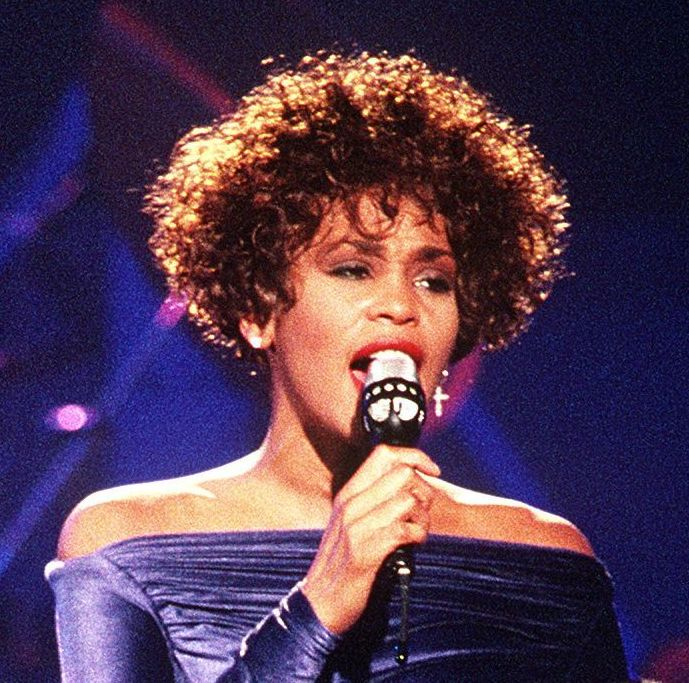
Whitney Houston

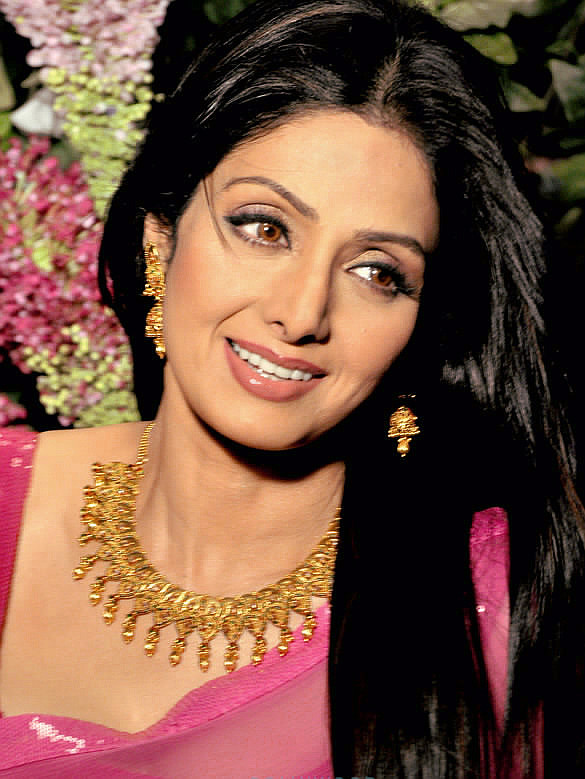
Sridevi

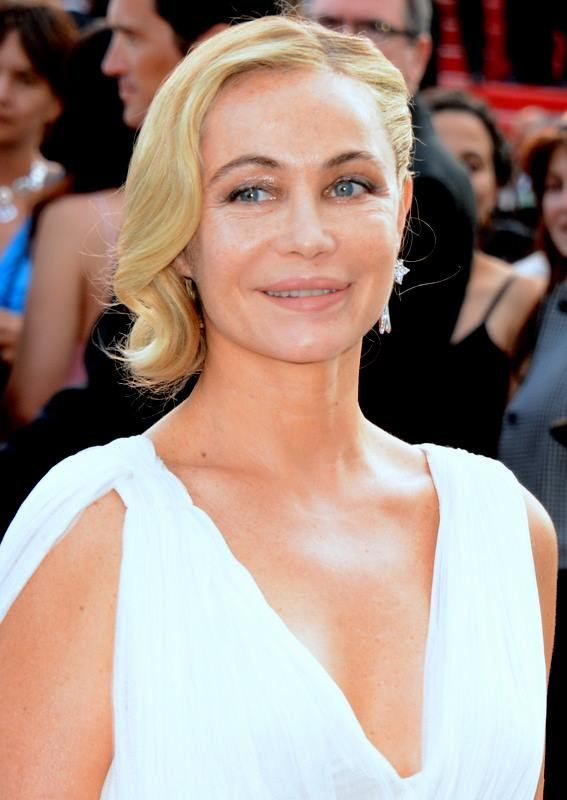
Emmanuelle Béart

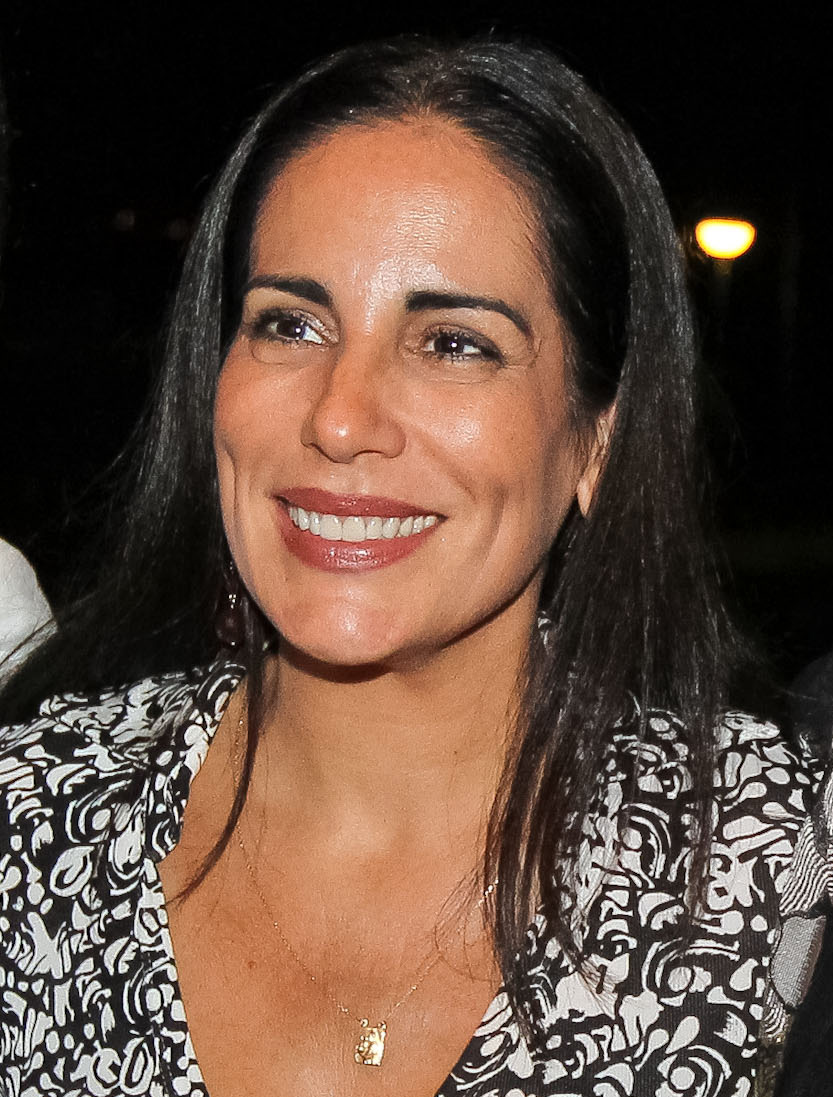
Glória Pires

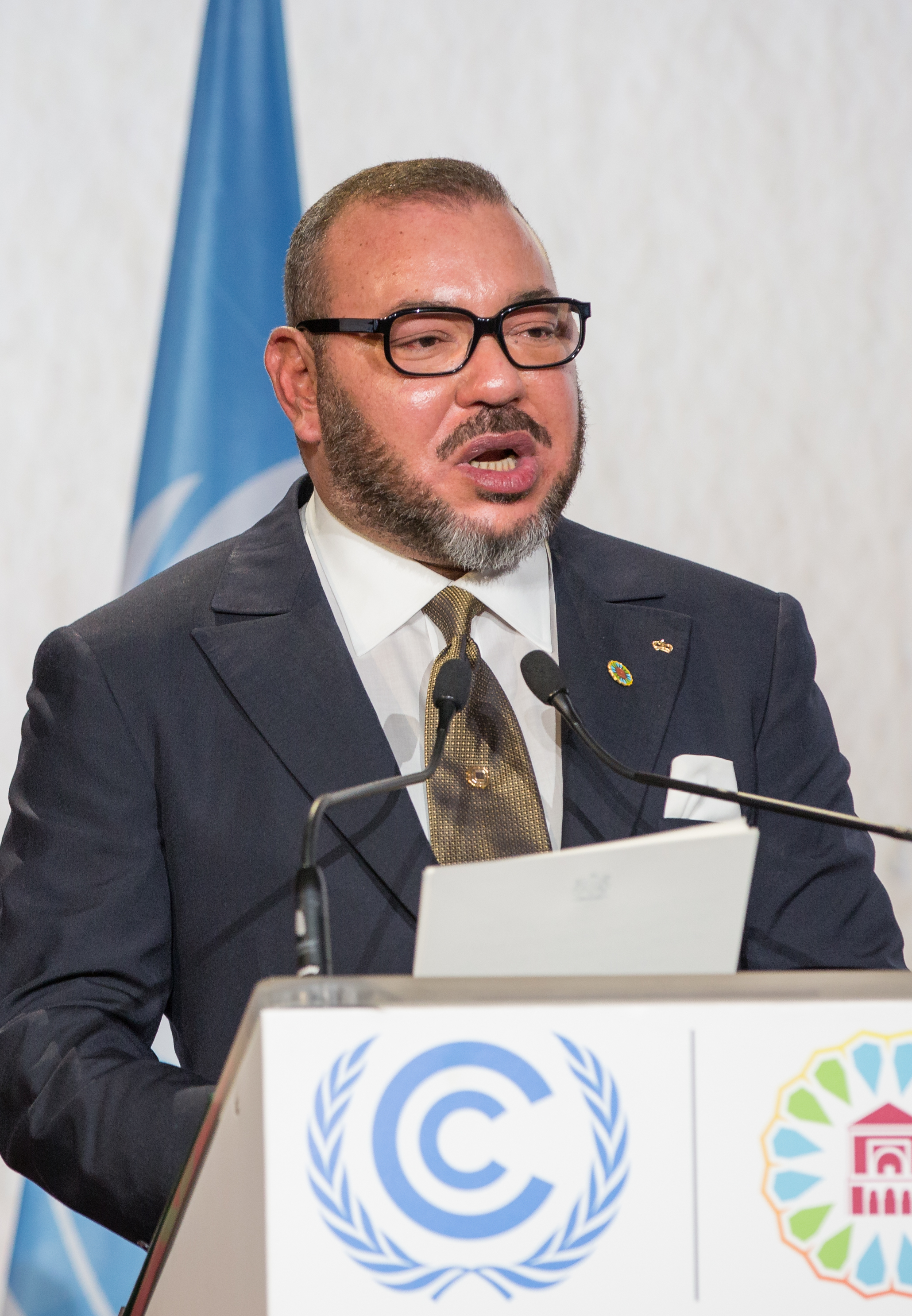
Mohammed VI of Morocco

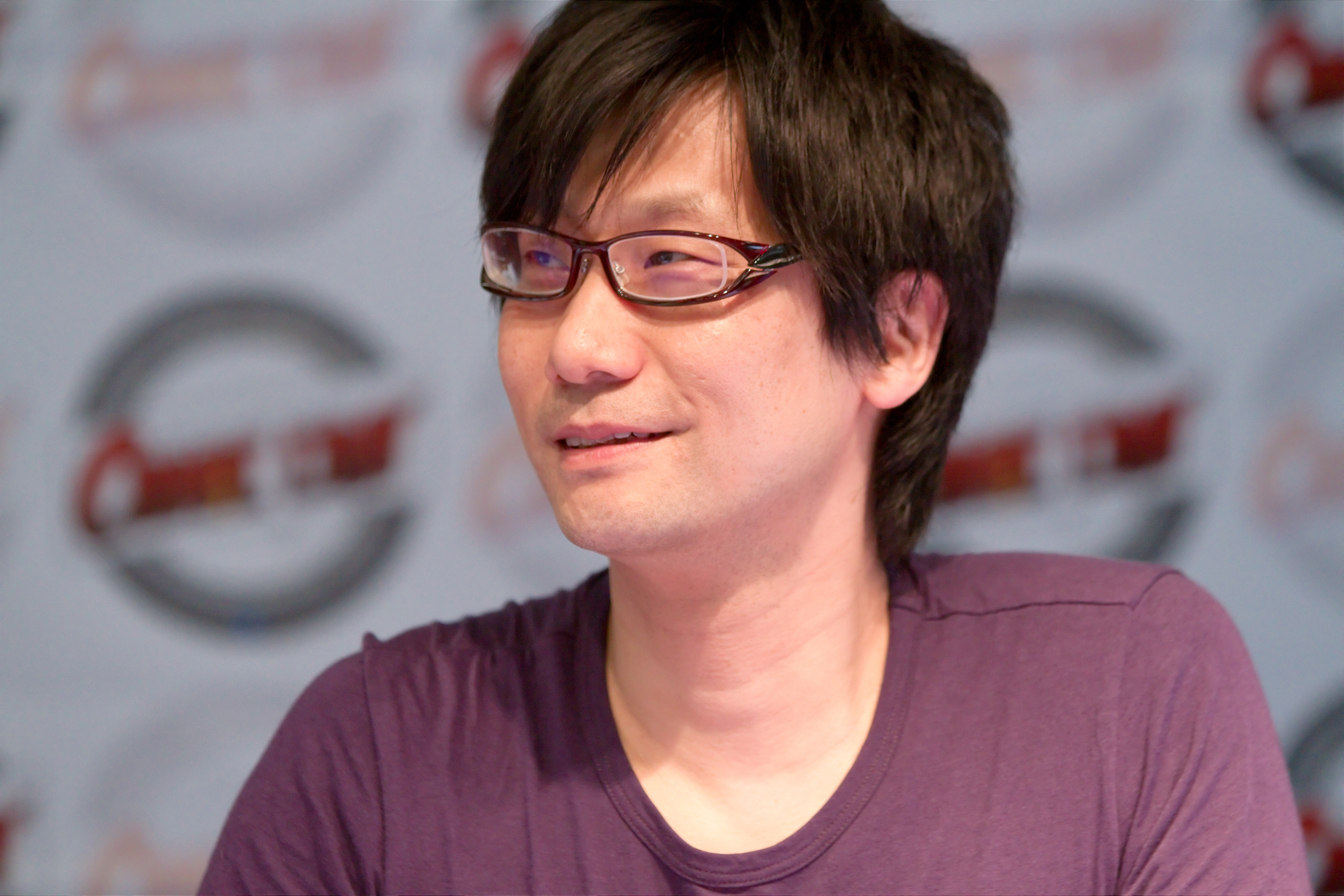
Hideo Kojima

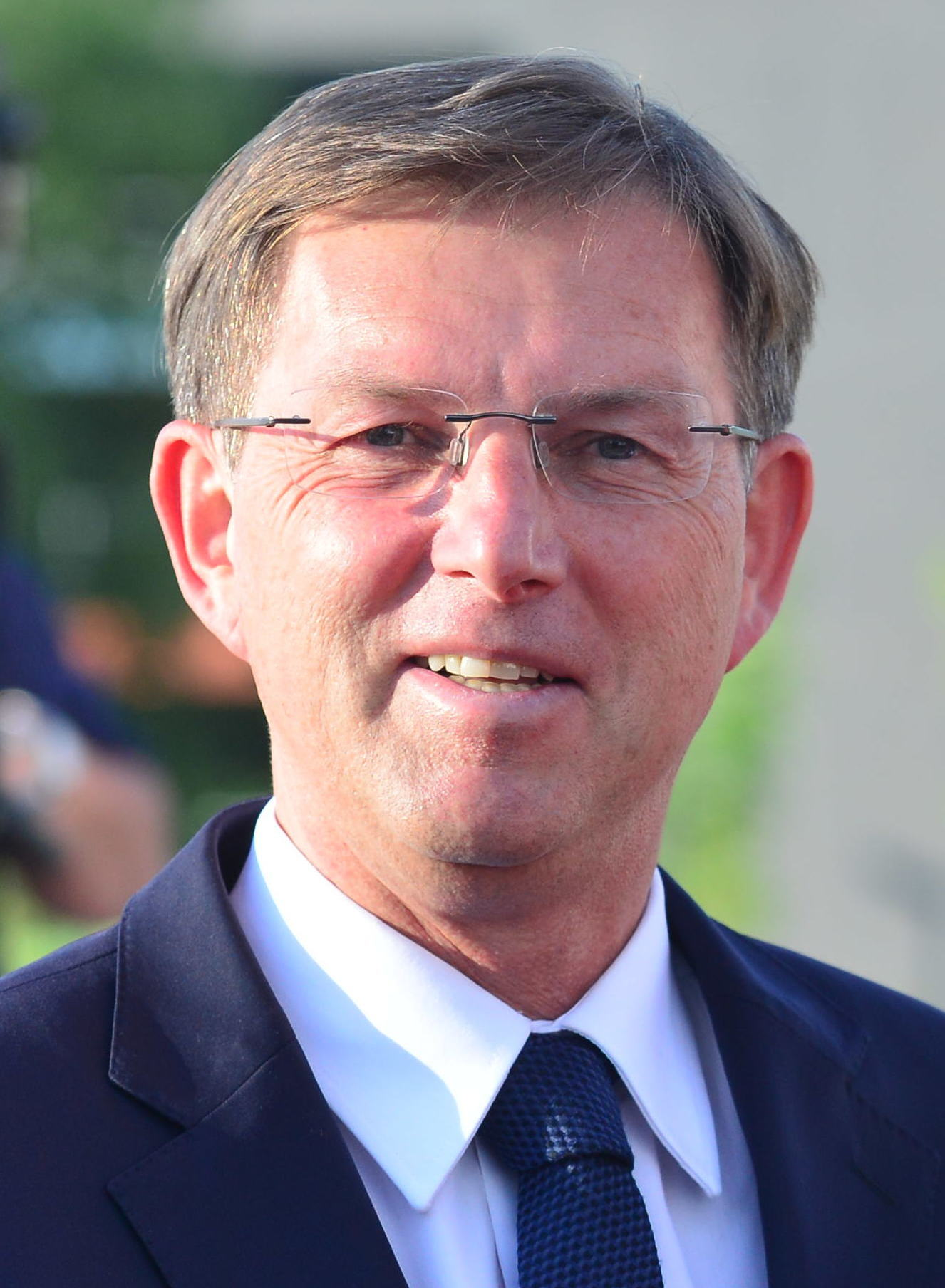
Miro Cerar

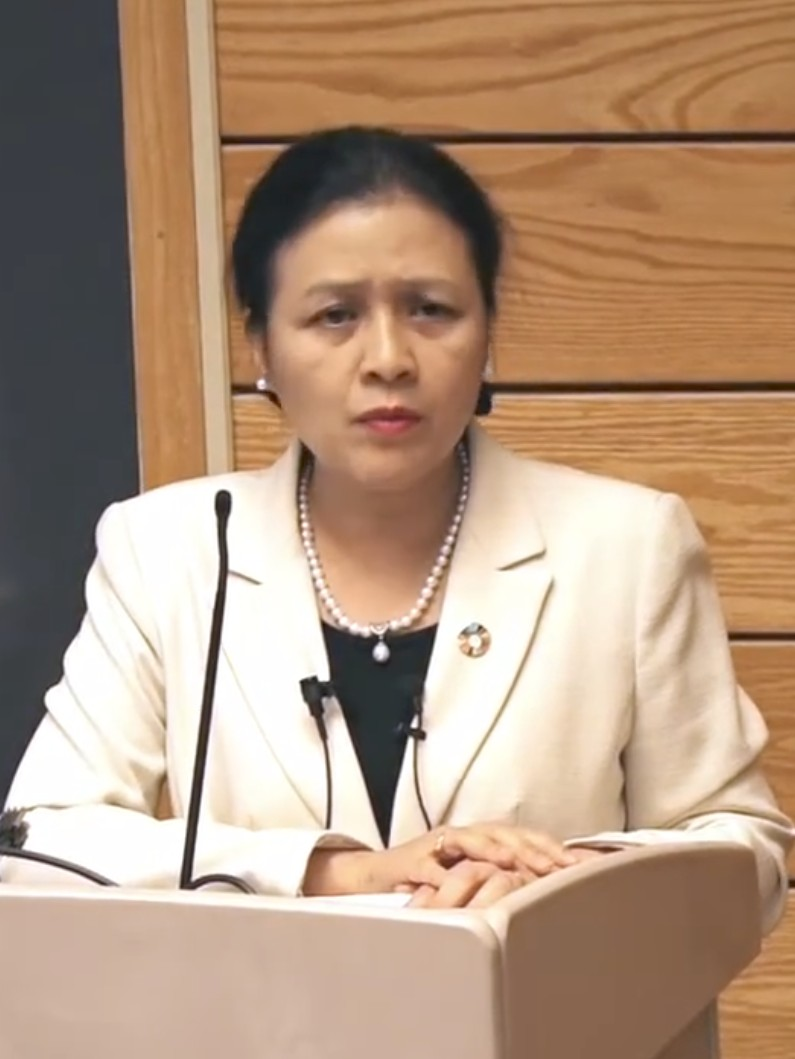
Nguyễn Phương Nga

- August 1
  - Coolio, American rapper (d. 2022)
  - Demián Bichir, Mexican-American actor
  - John Carroll Lynch, American actor and film director
- August 3
  - Tasmin Archer, English singer
  - James Hetfield, American heavy metal guitarist (Metallica)
- August 5
  - Mark Strong, English actor
  - Doris Schröder-Köpf, German journalist
- August 6
  - Jennifer Blakeman, American keyboardist (Private Life)
  - Kevin Mitnick, American computer hacker (d. 2023)
- August 7 – Harold Perrineau, American actor
- August 8
  - Emi Shinohara, Japanese voice actress and singer (d. 2024)
  - Rika Fukami, Japanese voice actress and singer
- August 9 – Whitney Houston, American singer (d. 2012)
- August 13
  - Sridevi, Indian actress (d. 2018)
  - Édouard Michelin, French businessman (d. 2006)
  - Valerie Plame, American writer and spy novelist
- August 14 – Emmanuelle Béart, French actress
- August 15
  - Alejandro González Iñárritu, Mexican film director, producer and screenwriter
  - Valery Levaneuski, entrepreneur, politician and political prisoner
- August 16 – Christine Cavanaugh, American actress and voice actress (d. 2014)
- August 18 – Heino Ferch, German actor
- August 19
  - Marcos Palmeira, Brazilian actor
  - John Stamos, American actor
  - Joey Tempest, Swedish singer (Europe)
- August 21
  - King Mohammed VI of Morocco
- August 22 – Tori Amos, American singer
- August 23
  - Hans-Henning Fastrich, German field hockey player
  - Laura Flores, Mexican actress, hostess and singer
  - Park Chan-wook, South Korean film director and screenwriter
  - Glória Pires, Brazilian actress
- August 24
  - Hideo Kojima, Japanese director, screenwriter, video game designer and video game producer
  - Kiko Pangilinan, Filipino lawyer and politician
- August 25 – Miro Cerar, 10th Prime Minister of Slovenia
- August 26 – Liu Huan, Chinese singer
- August 27 – Nguyễn Phương Nga, Vietnamese diplomat
- August 30
  - Michael Chiklis, American actor
  - Phil Mills, Welsh racing driver
- August 31 – Todd Carty, British-Irish actor

=== September ===
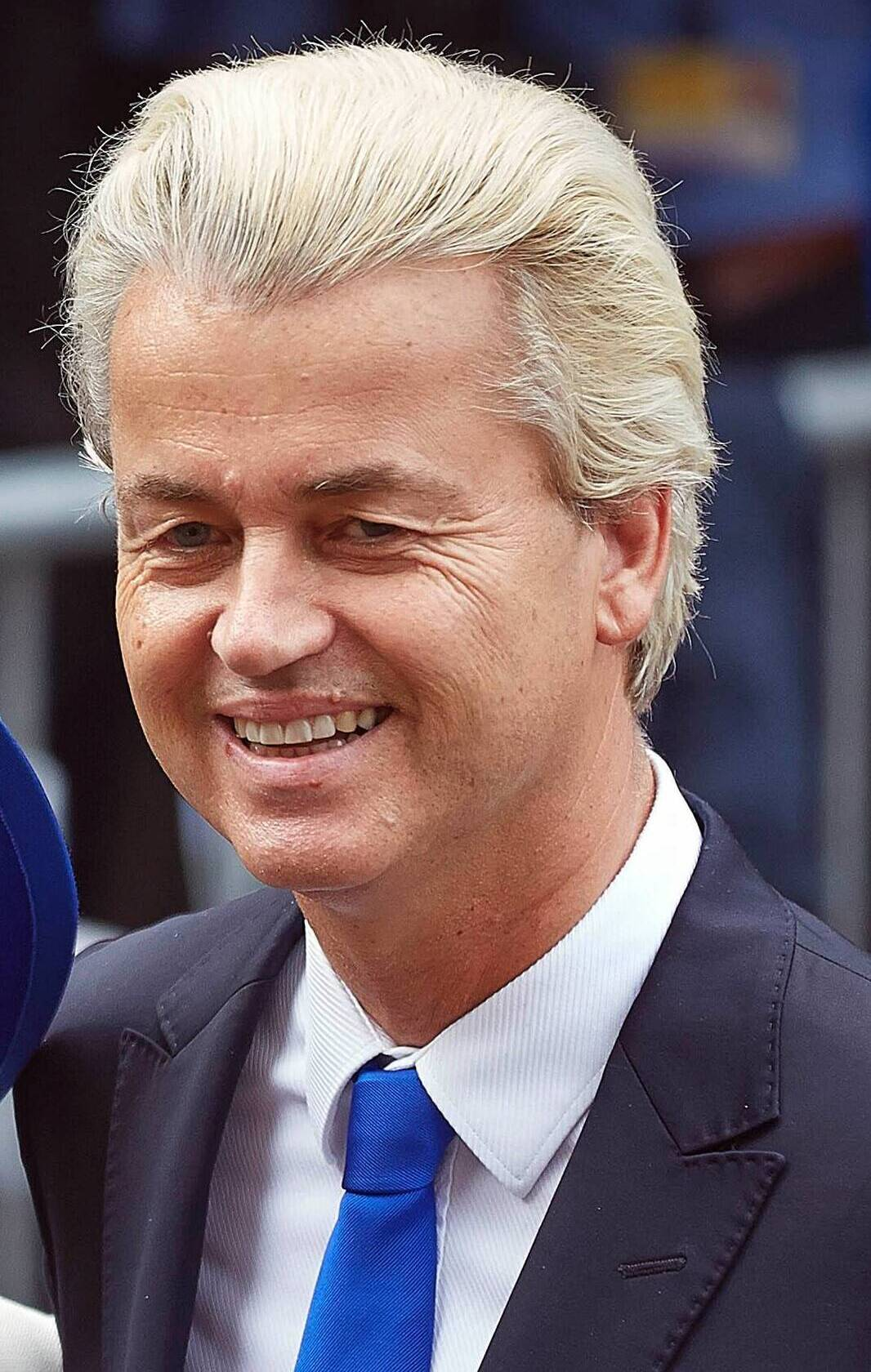
Geert Wilders

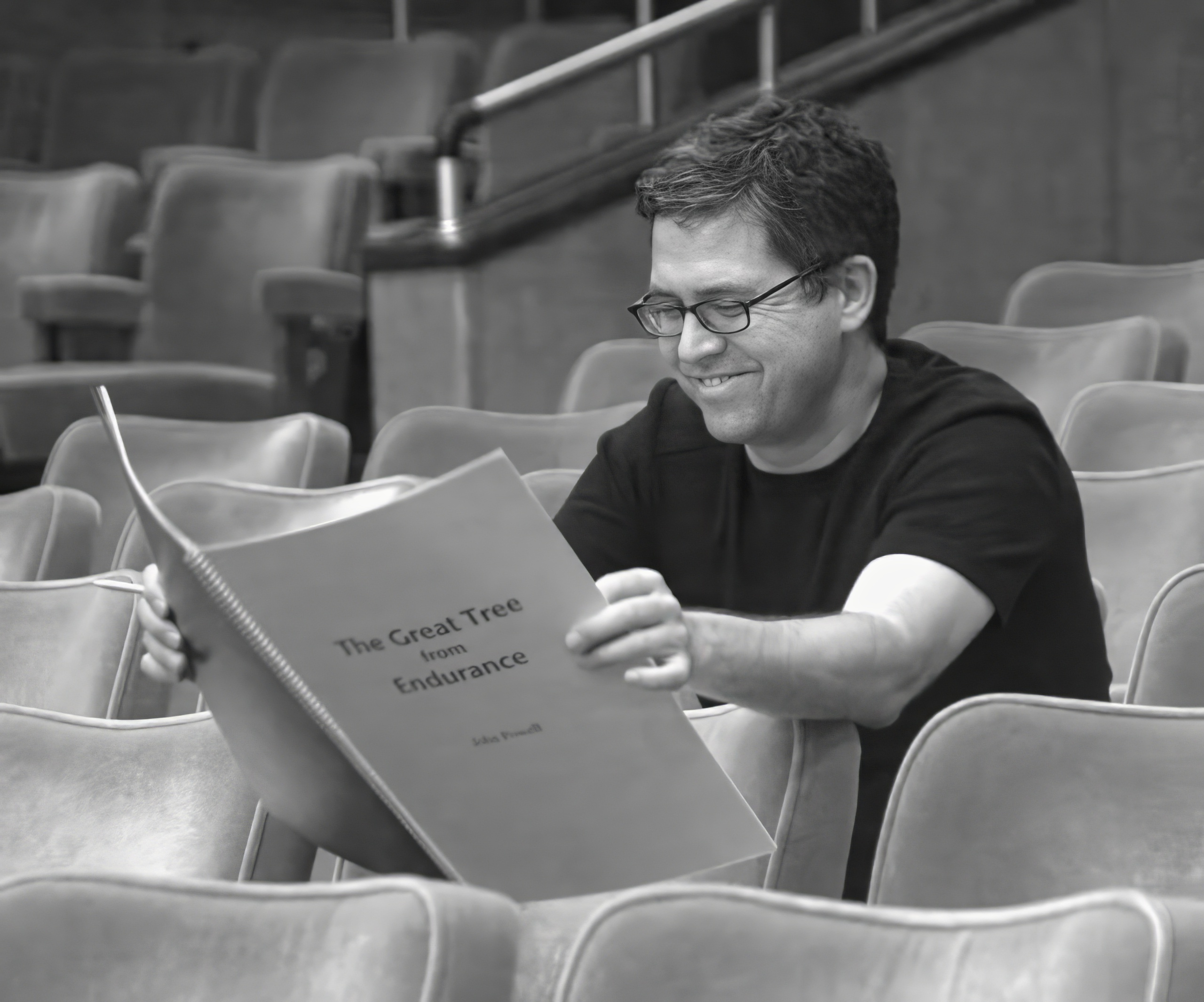
John Powell

- September 6
  - Betsy Russell, American actress
  - Geert Wilders, Dutch politician and critic of Islam
- September 8 – Li Ning, Chinese gymnast
- September 9
  - Markus Wasmeier, German alpine-skier
  - Chris Coons, US Senator
- September 10
  - Randy Johnson, American baseball player
  - Gabriel Tiacoh, Ivorian sprinter (d. 1992)
- September 11 – Gabriela Goldsmith, Mexican actress
- September 12 – Michael McElhatton, Irish actor and writer
- September 13 – Rex Heuermann, American serial killer
- September 14 – Robert Herjavec, Canadian businessman, investor and television personality
- September 16
  - Andréa Beltrão, Brazilian actress
  - Richard Marx, American pop/rock singer
- September 17 – Masahiro Chono, Japanese professional wrestler
- September 18
  - Christopher Heyerdahl, Canadian actor
  - John Powell, English-American composer, conductor, pianist and record producer
  - Dan Povenmire, American animator, producer and voice actor
- September 19
  - Jarvis Cocker, English rock musician (Pulp)
  - David Seaman, English football goalkeeper
- September 21
  - Cecil Fielder, American baseball player
  - Angus Macfadyen, Scottish actor
  - Mamoru Samuragochi, Japanese impostor
- September 23 – Michiru Yamane, Japanese composer
- September 25 – Tate Donovan, American actor and director
- September 29
  - Dave Andreychuk, Canadian hockey player
  - Les Claypool, American bassist (Primus)

=== October ===
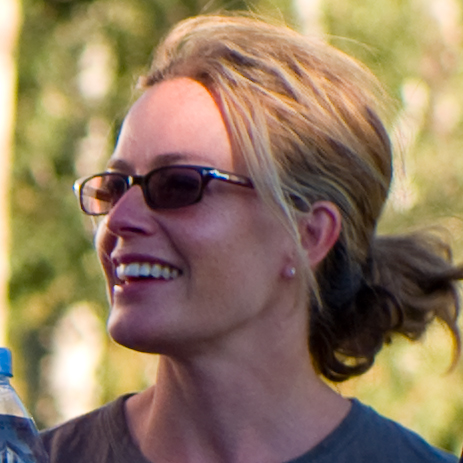
Elisabeth Shue

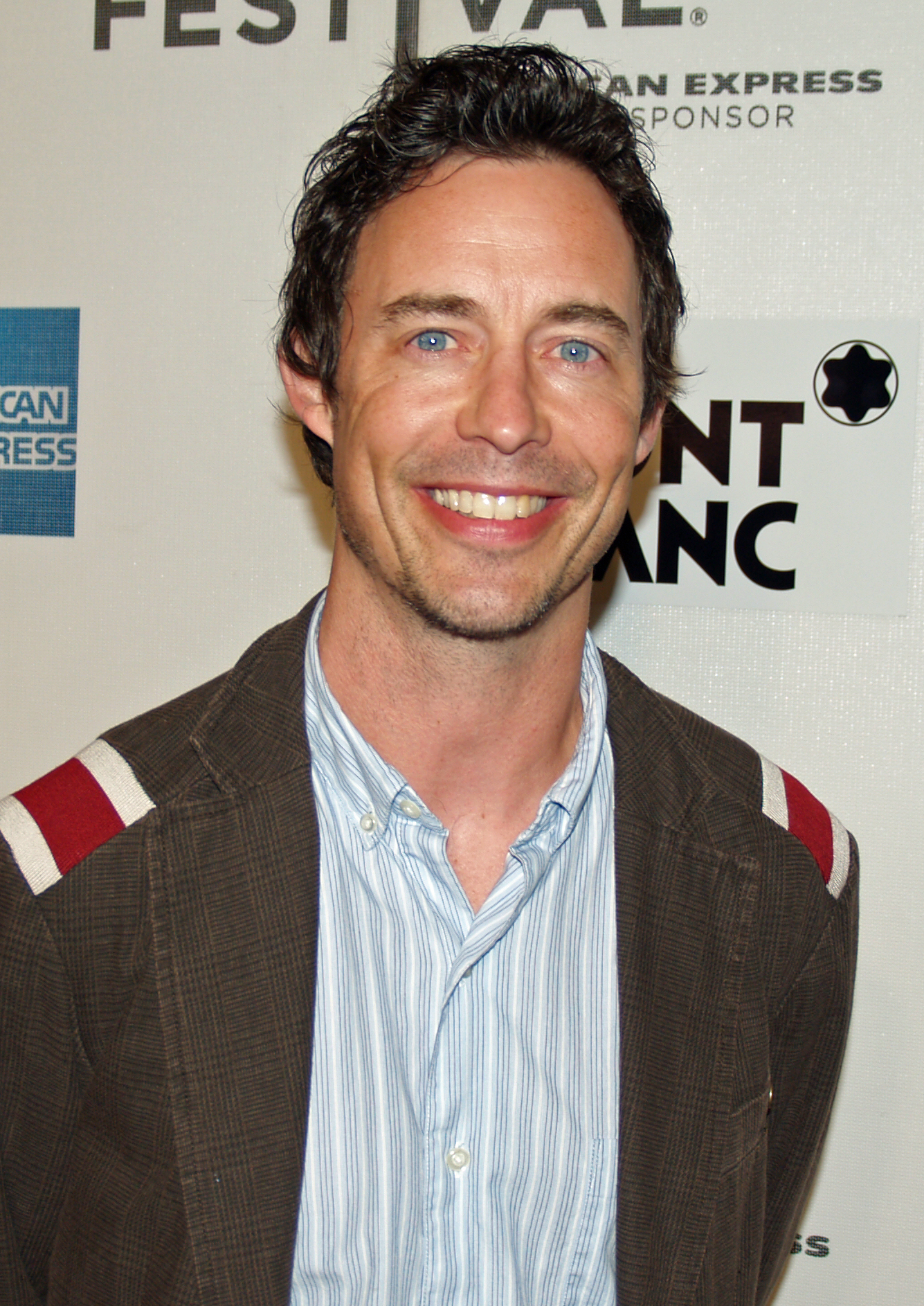
Tom Cavanagh

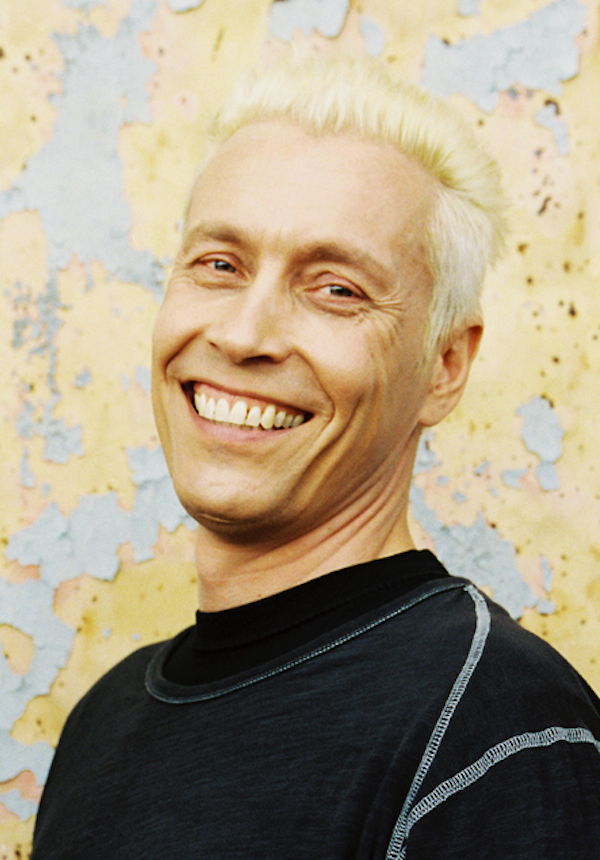
Farin Urlaub

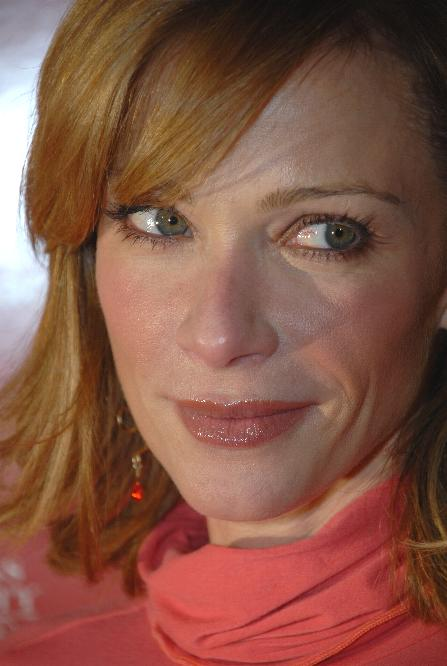
Lauren Holly

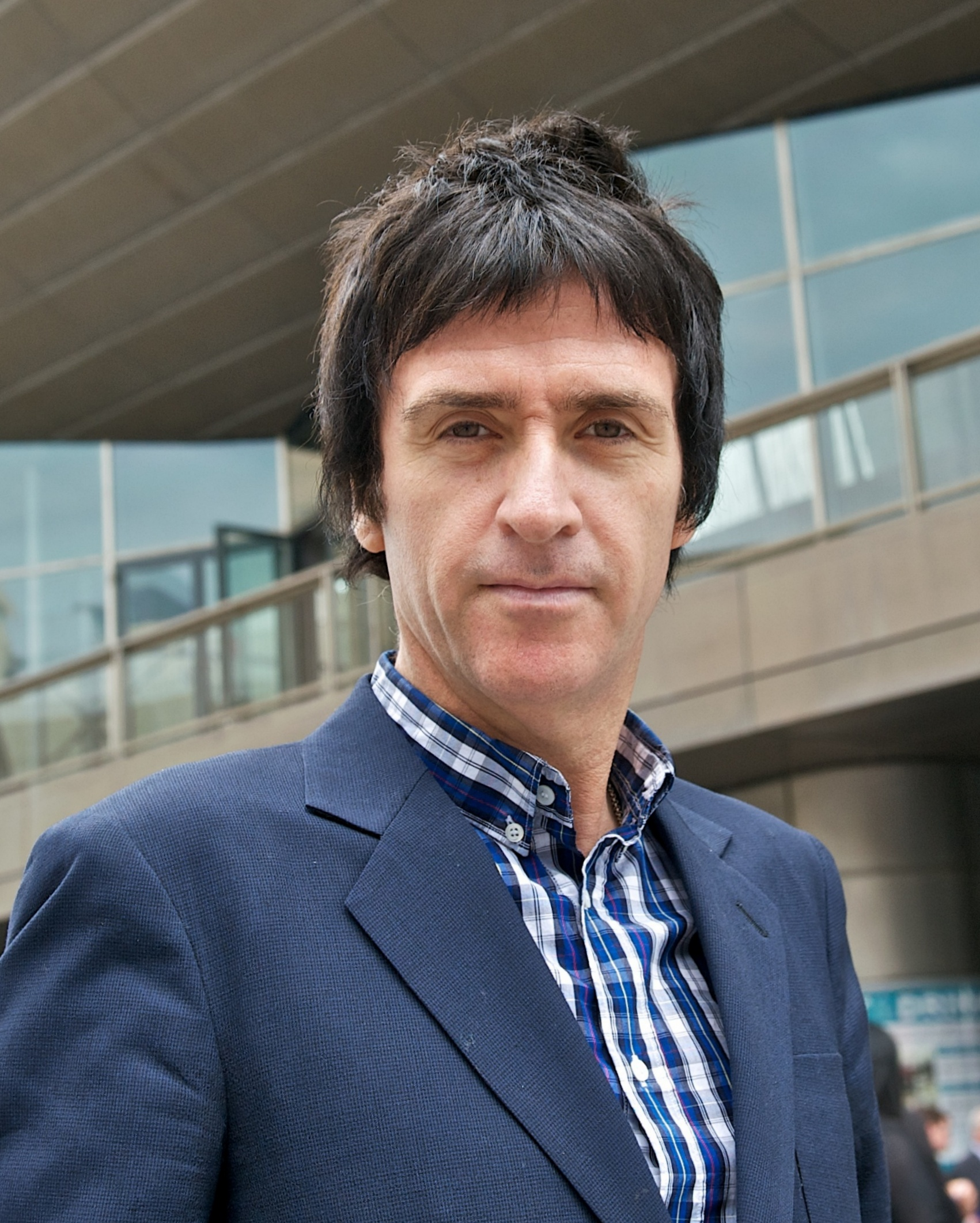
Johnny Marr

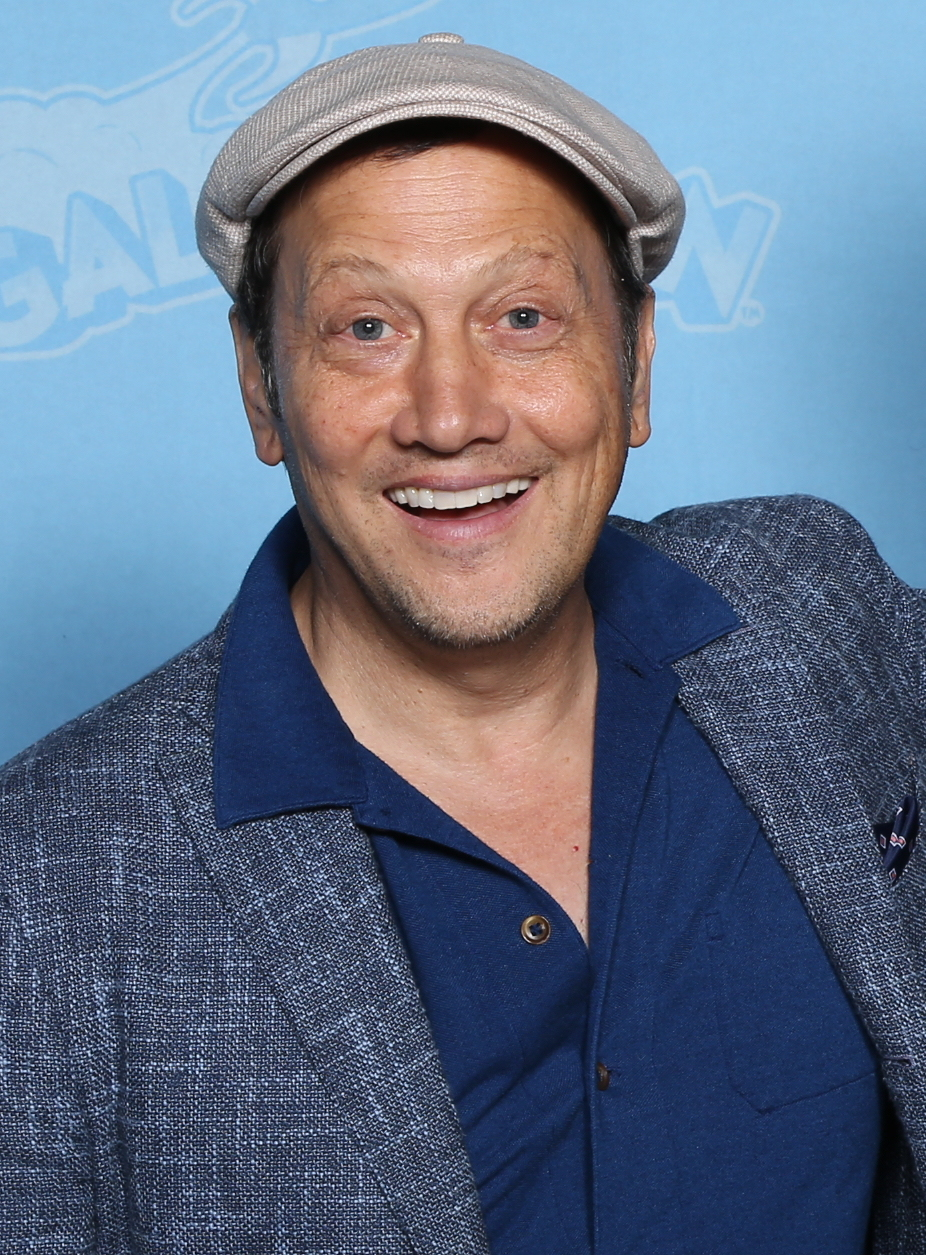
Rob Schneider

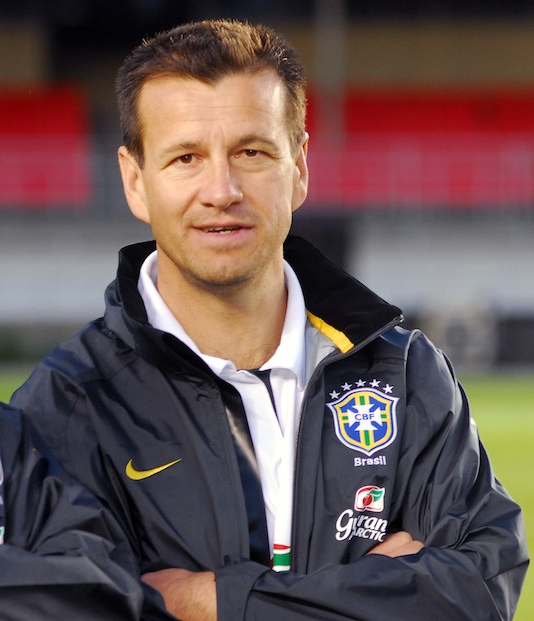
Dunga

- October 1
  - Mark McGwire, American baseball player
  - Iriana Joko Widodo, 7th First Lady of Indonesia, wife of Joko Widodo
- October 2 – Maria Ressa, Filipina American campaigning journalist, Nobel Prize laureate
- October 4 – Marcelo Buquet, Uruguayan-Mexican actor, previously model
- October 5 –Dame Laura Davies, English golfer
- October 6 – Elisabeth Shue, American actress
- October 10
  - Anita Mui, Hong Kong singer (d. 2003)
  - Daniel Pearl, American journalist (d. 2002)
  - Jolanda de Rover, Dutch swimmer
  - Vegard Ulvang, Norwegian cross-country skier
- October 11 – Ronny Rosenthal, Israeli footballer
- October 12 – Satoshi Kon, Japanese anime director (d. 2010)
- October 13 – Ha Seung Moo, Korean poet and theologian
- October 14 – Alan McDonald, Northern Irish footballer
- October 19
  - Elsa Castillo, Venezuelan teacher and trade unionist
  - Prince Laurent of Belgium
  - Sinitta, Anglo-American singer
- October 20
  - Domingos Simões Pereira, 16th Prime Minister of Guinea-Bissau
  - Julie Payette, Canadian astronaut and Governor General of Canada
- October 21 – Marisa Orth, Brazilian actress, singer and TV host
- October 22 – Brian Boitano, American figure skater
- October 23
  - Gordon Korman, Canadian-American children's and young adult author
  - Wilson Yip, Hong Kong actor and director
- October 25 – John Levén, Swedish bassist (Europe)
- October 26
  - Tom Cavanagh, Canadian actor and director
  - Natalie Merchant, American singer-songwriter
- October 27
  - Sergey Smiryagin, Russian freestyle swimmer (d. 2020)
  - Feyyaz Uçar, Turkish footballer
  - Farin Urlaub, German singer, band Die Ärzte
  - Marla Maples, American actress and television personality
- October 28 – Lauren Holly, American actress
- October 31
  - Dunga, Brazilian footballer
  - Johnny Marr, English alternative rock musician
  - Dermot Mulroney, American actor
  - Rob Schneider, American actor, comedian and film director

=== November ===
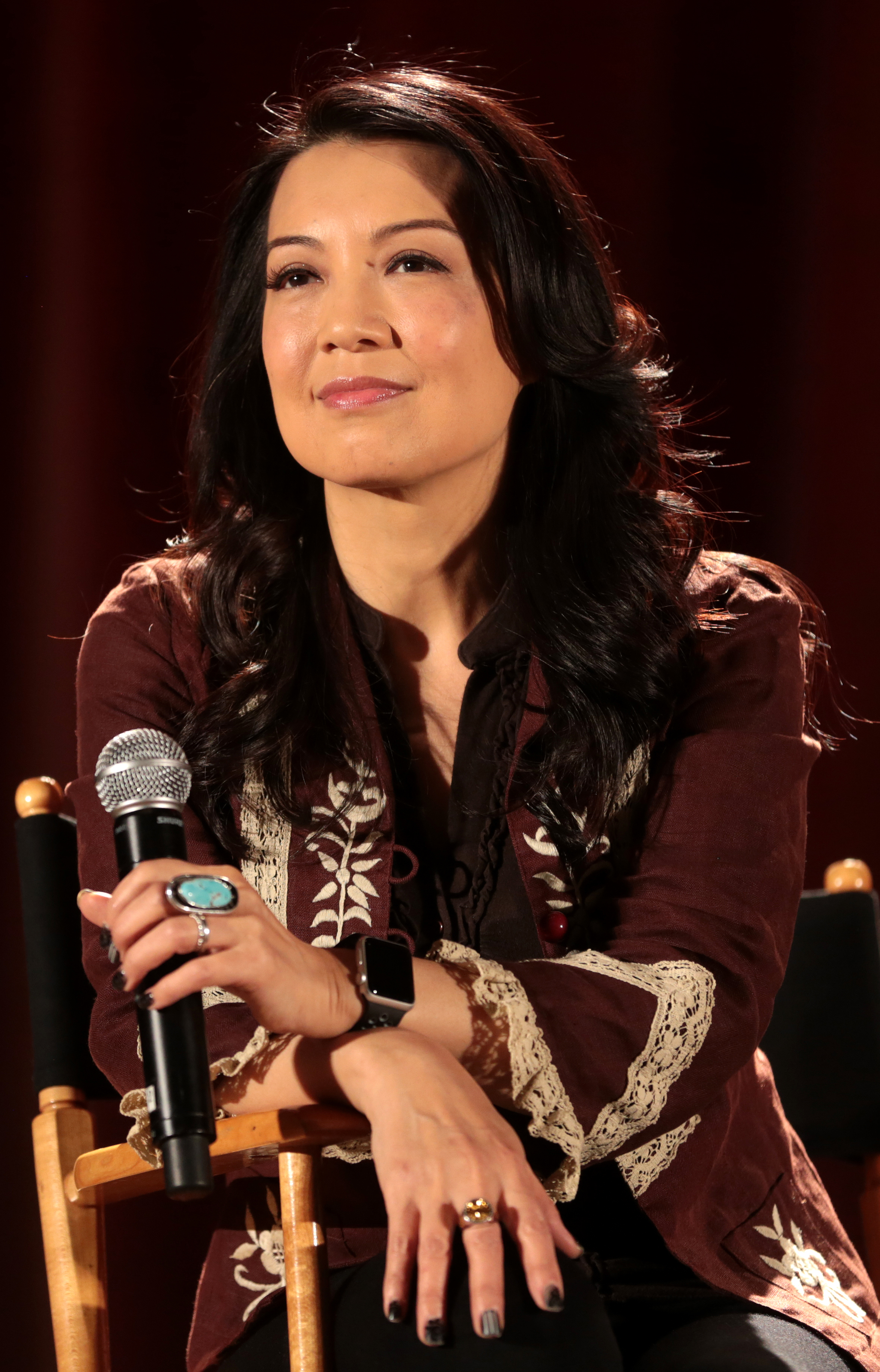
Ming-Na Wen

- November 1
  - Rick Allen, British rock drummer (Def Leppard)
  - Mark Hughes, Welsh football player & manager
  - Katja Riemann, German actress
- November 2
  - Brian Kemp, American politician, 83rd Governor of Georgia
  - Craig Saavedra, American filmmaker
  - Borut Pahor, President of Slovenia
- November 4 – Lena Zavaroni, Scottish entertainer (d. 1999)
- November 5 – Tatum O'Neal, American actress and author
- November 7 – John Barnes, Jamaican-born English footballer
- November 10
  - Hugh Bonneville, British actor
  - Mike Powell, American long jumper
- November 11 – Billy Gunn, American professional wrestler
- November 15 – Benny Elias, Australian rugby league player
- November 18 – Peter Schmeichel, Danish-born football goalkeeper
- November 19 – Terry Farrell, American actress
- November 20 – Ming-Na Wen, Macanese-American actress
- November 21 – Nicollette Sheridan, English actress
- November 23 – Erika Buenfil, Mexican actress, TV host and singer
- November 25 – Holly Cole, Canadian jazz singer

=== December ===
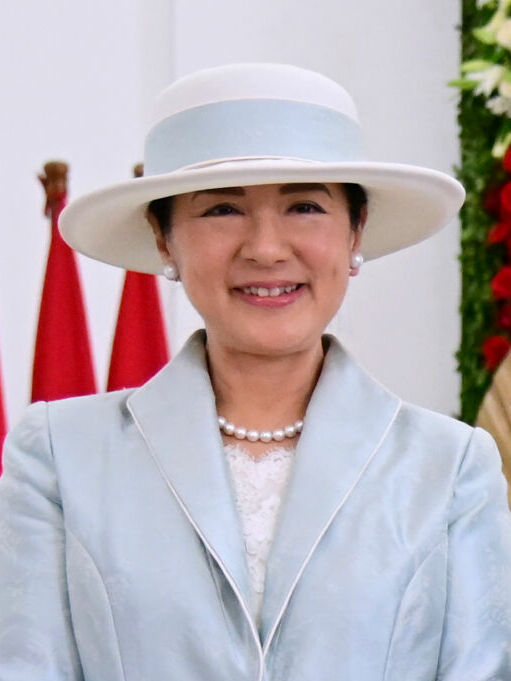
Empress Masako

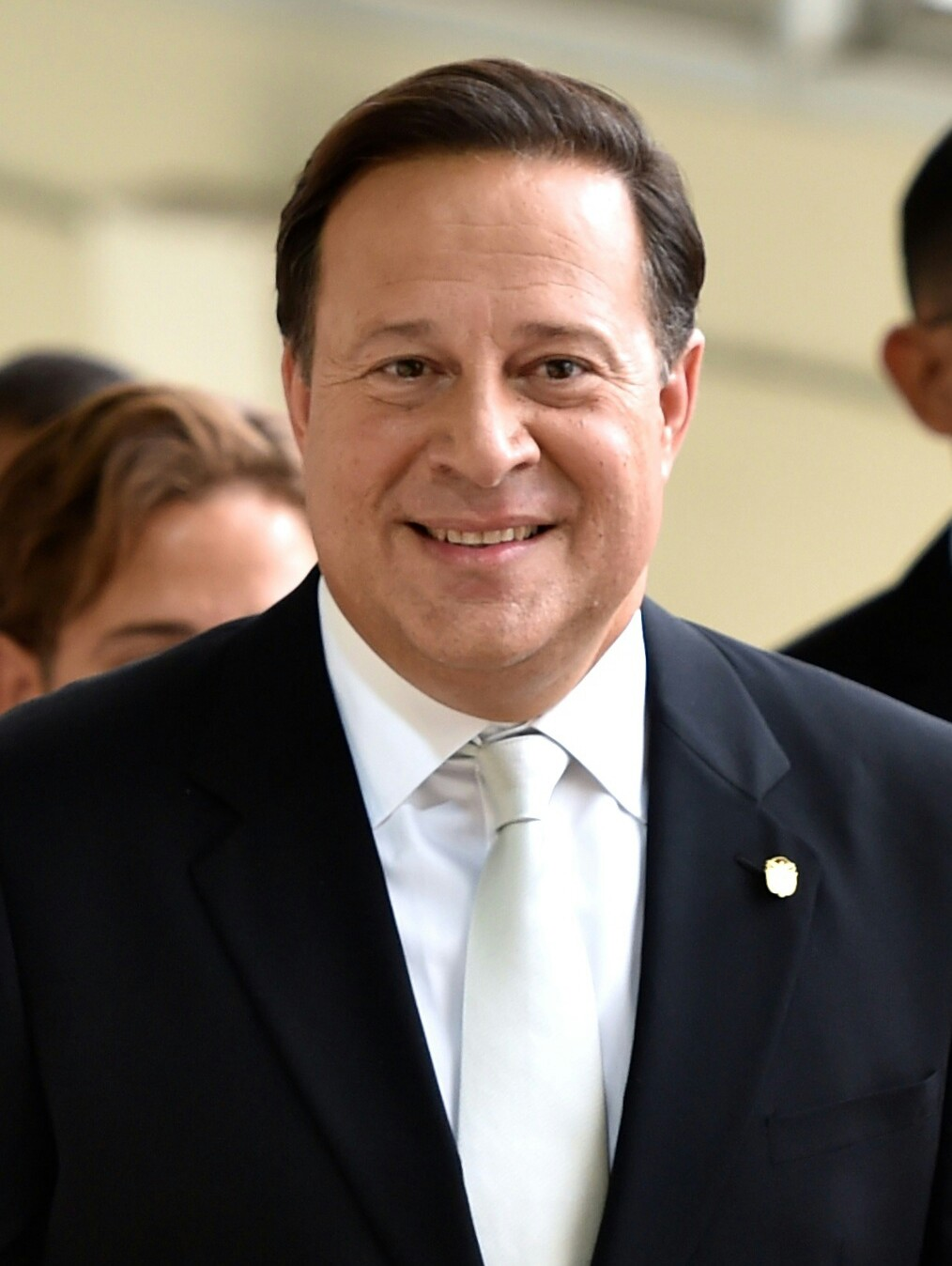
Juan Carlos Varela

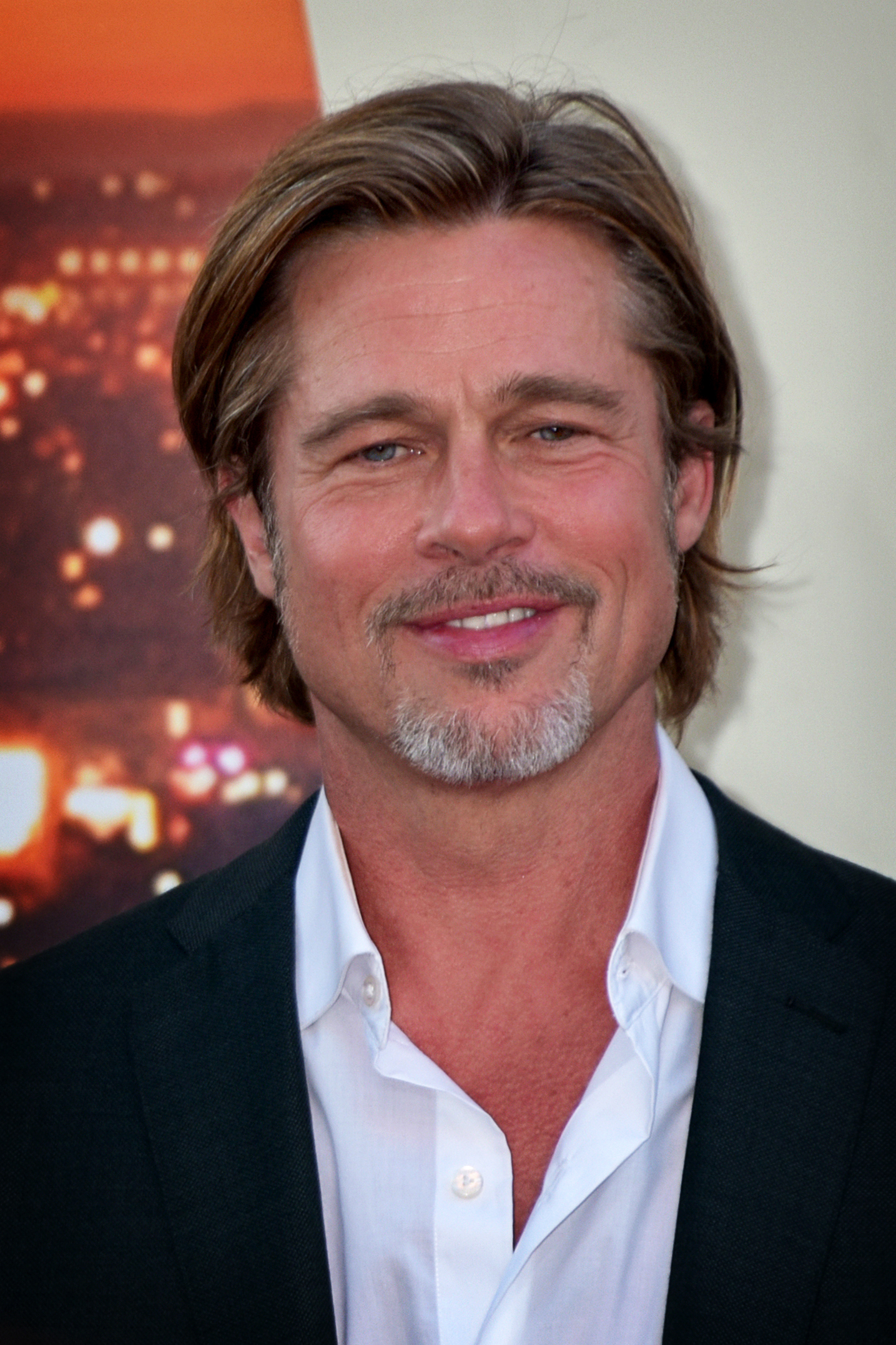
Brad Pitt

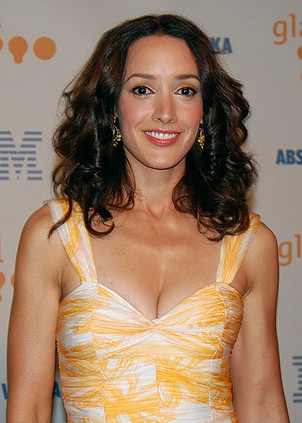
Jennifer Beals

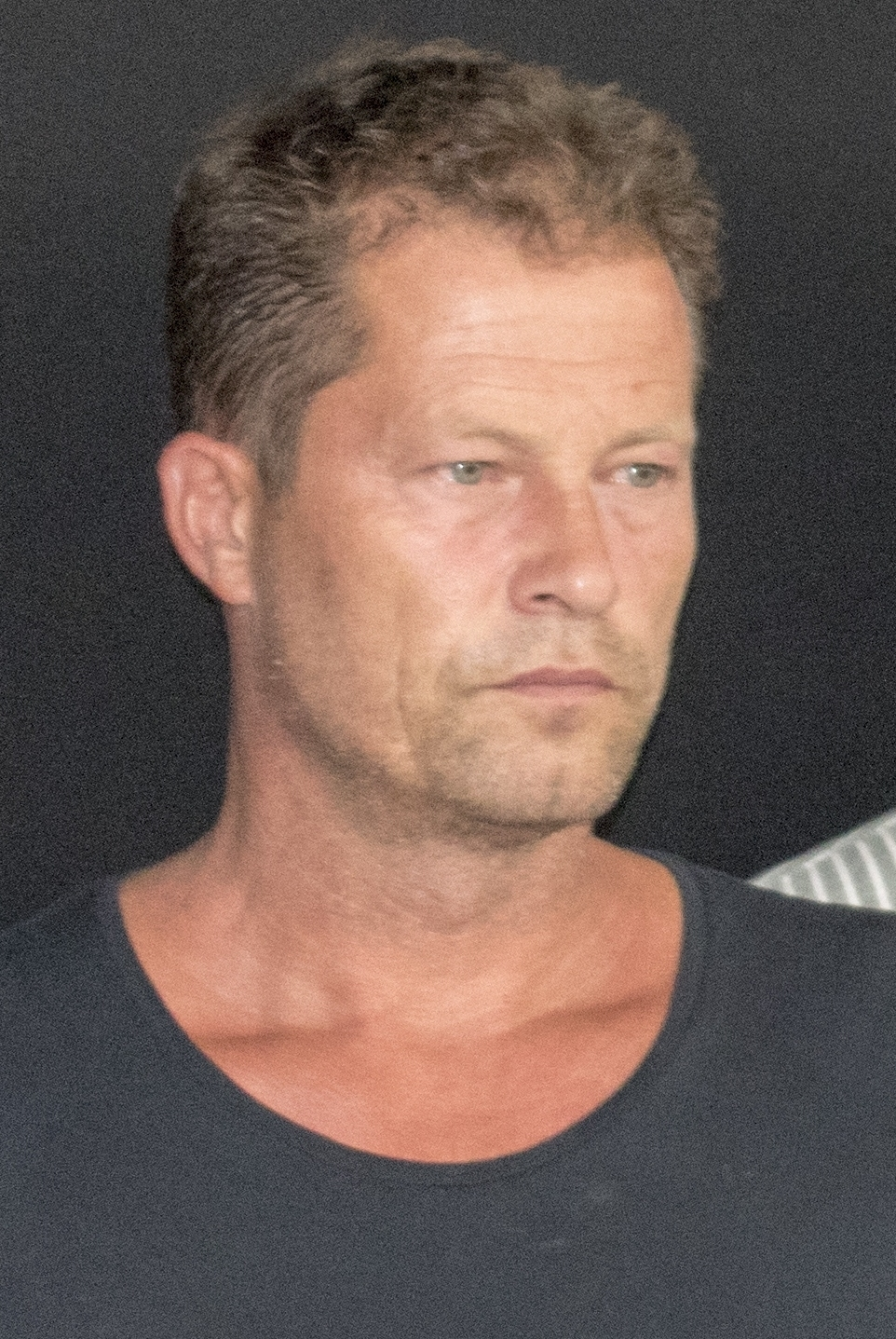
Til Schweiger

- December 2 – Ann Patchett, American novelist
- December 4 – Sergey Bubka, Ukrainian pole vaulter
- December 7 – Mark Bowen, Welsh footballer
- December 8
  - Greg Howe, American guitarist
  - Toshiaki Kawada, Japanese professional wrestler
  - Lee Jae-myung, president of South Korea
- December 9
  - Empress Masako, Japanese consort of Emperor Naruhito
  - Bárbara Palacios, Miss Universe 1986
- December 12 – Ai Orikasa, Japanese voice actress
- December 13
  - Uwe-Jens Mey, German speed skater
  - Jake White, South African rugby coach
- December 14
  - Cynthia Gibb, American actress
  - Vytautas Juozapaitis, Lithuanian baritone, professor and television host
- December 15 – Helen Slater, American actress and singer- songwriter
- December 16
  - Benjamin Bratt, American actor
  - Jeff Carson, American singer
  - Bärbel Schäfer, German television presenter and talk show host
- December 18
  - Pauline Ester, French singer
  - Rikiya Koyama, Japanese voice actor
  - Charles Oakley, American basketball player
  - Brad Pitt, American actor and film producer, co-founder of Plan B Entertainment
- December 19
  - Jennifer Beals, American actress
  - Til Schweiger, German actor
- December 20
  - Infanta Elena, Duchess of Lugo, Spanish princess
  - Iqbal Theba, Pakistani actor
- December 21
  - Donovan Ruddock, Jamaican Canadian professional boxer
  - Govinda Ahuja, Indian actor and politician
  - Jacques Simonet, Belgian politician (d. 2007)
- December 22
  - Vladimir Flórez, Colombian cartoonist
  - Bryan Gunn, Scottish footballer
  - Luna H. Mitani, Japanese-American Surrealist painter
- December 23 – Donna Tartt, American novelist
- December 24
  - Caroline Aherne, English actress, comedienne and screenwriter (d. 2016)
  - Sanjay Mehrotra, Indian entrepreneur
- December 26 – Lars Ulrich, Danish rock drummer (Metallica)
- December 29
  - Graciano Rocchigiani, German professional boxer (d. 2018)
  - Francisco Bustamante, Filipino billiard player
  - Ulf Kristersson, 35th Prime Minister of Sweden
  - Sean Payton, American football coach
- December 31 – Azalina Othman Said, Malaysian politician

== Deaths ==
=== January ===
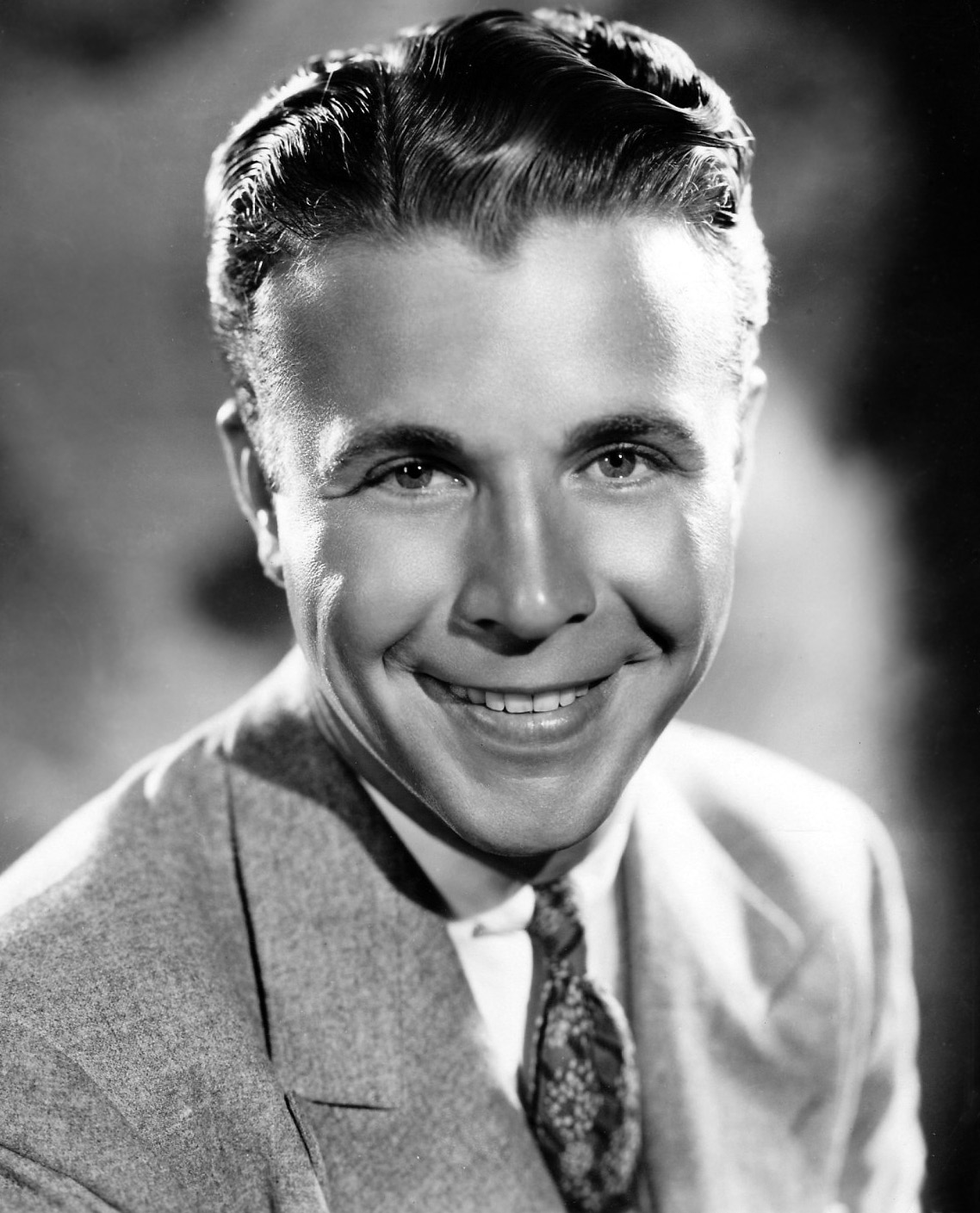
Dick Powell

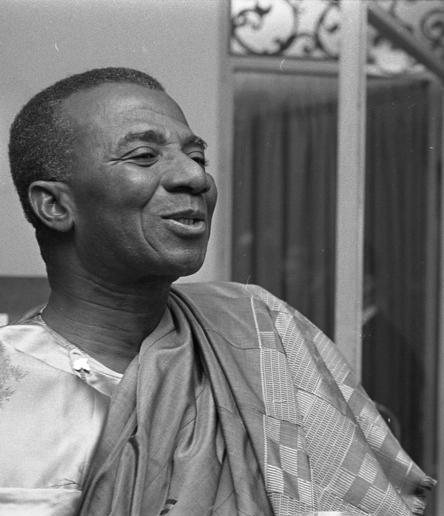
Sylvanus Olympio

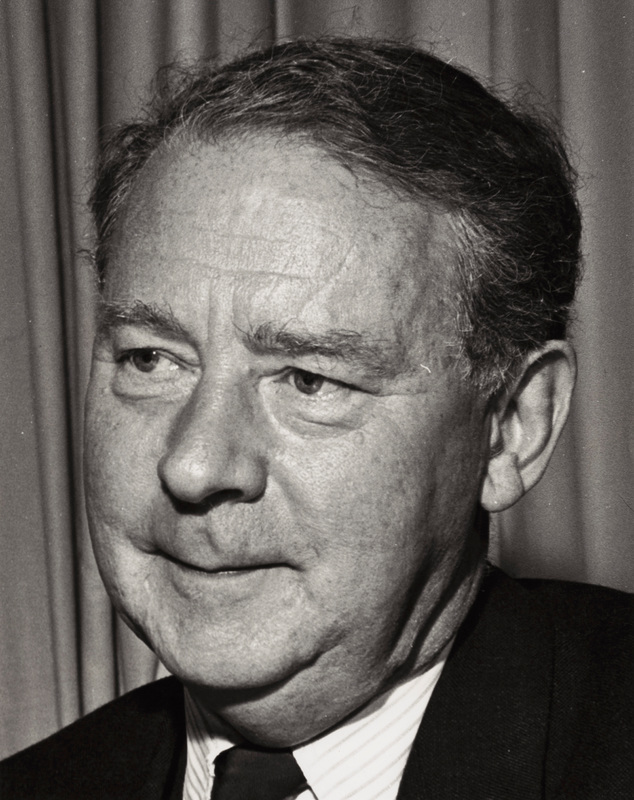
Hugh Gaitskell

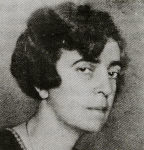
Avra Theodoropoulou

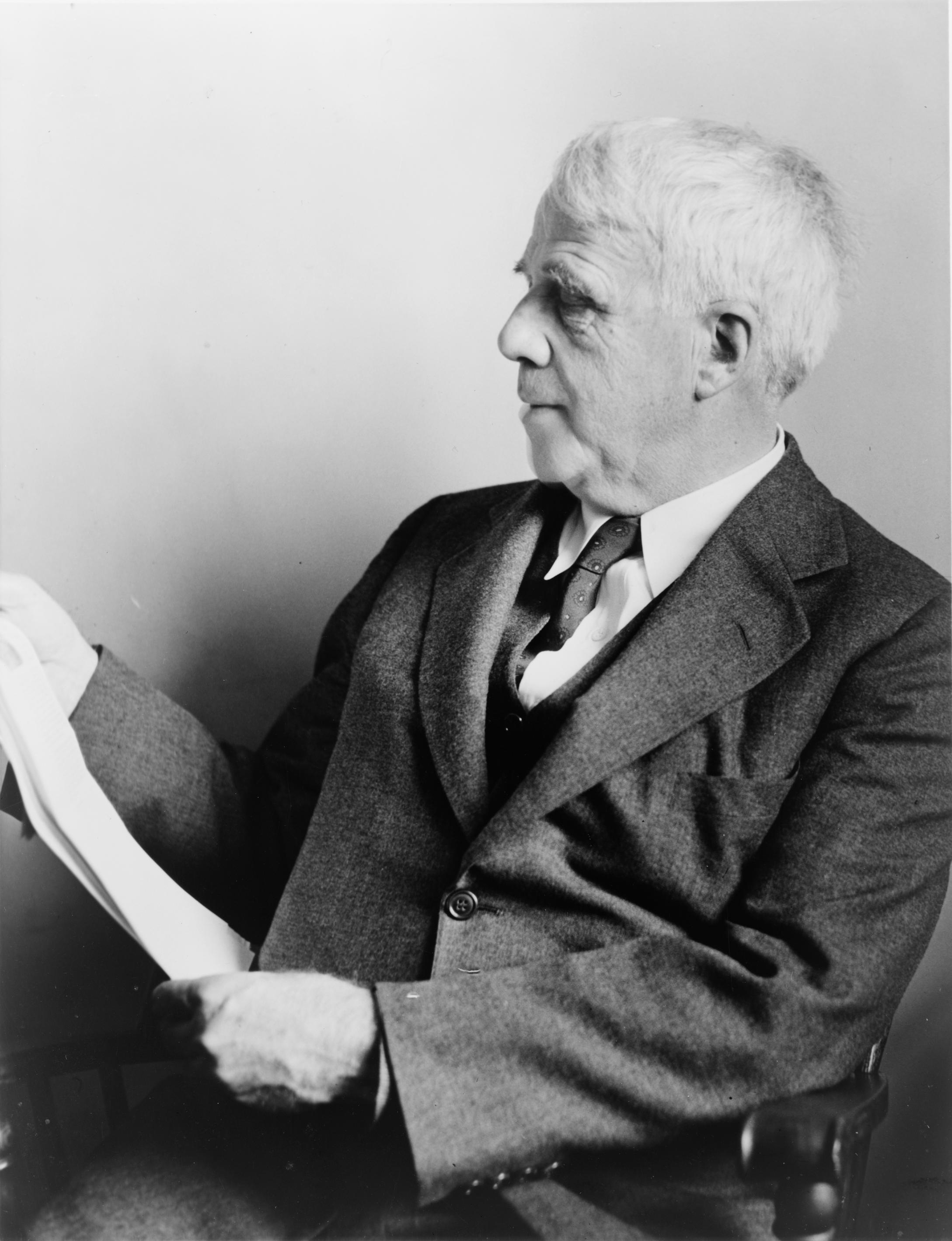
Robert Frost

- January 2
  - Jack Carson, Canadian actor (b. 1910)
  - Dick Powell, American actor (b. 1904)
- January 3 – Shinobu Ishihara, Japanese ophthalmologist (b. 1879)
- January 5
  - Rogers Hornsby, American baseball player (b. 1896)
  - Erik Strandmark, Swedish film actor (b. 1919)
- January 6 – Frank Tuttle, American film director (b. 1892)
- January 7 – Erik Lundqvist, Swedish athlete (b. 1908)
- January 9 – Enea Bossi, Sr., Italian-born American aerospace engineer and aviation pioneer (b. 1888)
- January 10 – Franz Planer, Austrian film cinematographer (b. 1894)
- January 13
  - Sonny Clark, American jazz pianist (b. 1931)
  - Sylvanus Olympio, Togolese politician, 1st President of Togo (assassinated) (b. 1902)
  - Ramón Gómez de la Serna, Spanish writer (b. 1888)
- January 14
  - Hugh Greer, American basketball coach (b. 1904)
  - Gustav Regler, German socialist novelist (b. 1898)
- January 15 – Cesare Fantoni, Italian actor and voice actor (b. 1905)
- January 18 – Hugh Gaitskell, British politician, leader of the Labour Party (b. 1906)
- January 20
  - Fyodor Terentyev, Soviet Olympic cross-country skier (b. 1925)
  - Avra Theodoropoulou, Greek suffragist (b. 1880)
- January 21 – Al St. John, American actor (b. 1892)
- January 23
  - Mohammad Ali Bogra, Pakistani statesman, politician and diplomat, 3rd Prime Minister of Pakistan (b. 1909)
  - Józef Gosławski, Polish sculptor and medallic artist (b. 1908)
- January 24
  - Otto Harbach, American lyricist and librettist (b. 1873)
  - Kenneth Western, part of The Western Brothers (b. 1899)
- January 25 – Marion Sunshine, American actress (b. 1894)
- January 26
  - Hans Kopfermann, German physicist (b. 1895)
  - Ole Olsen, American actor (b. 1892)
- January 27 – John Farrow, Australian-born American film director (b. 1904)
- January 29
  - Anthony Coldeway, American screenwriter (b. 1887)
  - Robert Frost, American poet (b. 1874)
  - Lee Meadows, American baseball player (b. 1894)
  - Isaías de Noronha, 13th President of Brazil (b. 1873)
- January 30
  - Jane Gail, American silent movie and stage actress (b. 1890)
  - Francis Poulenc, French composer (b. 1899)
- January 31 – Alasgar Alakbarov, Azerbaijani actor (b. 1910)

=== February ===
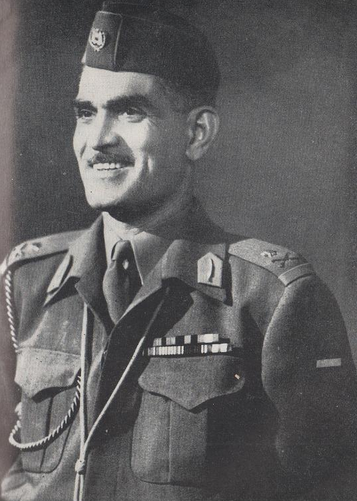
Abd al-Karim Qasim

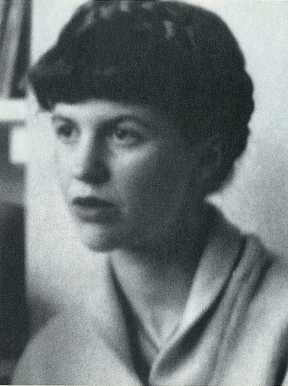
Sylvia Plath

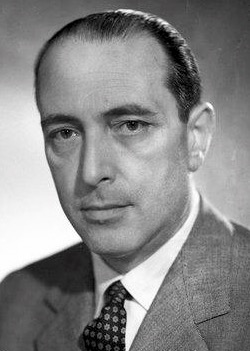
Fernando Tambroni

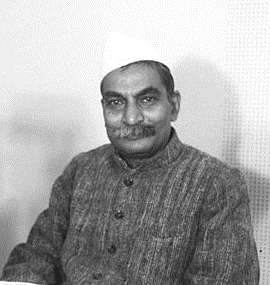
Rajendra Prasad

- February 1
  - Louis D. Lighton, American screenwriter and producer (b. 1895)
  - Wyndham Standing, English actor (b. 1880)
- February 2 – William Gaxton, American vaudeville, film and theatre performer (b. 1893)
- February 6
  - Abd el-Krim, Riffian political and military leader (b. 1882)
  - Piero Manzoni, Italian artist (b. 1933)
- February 8 – George Dolenz, American actor (b. 1908)
- February 9 – Abd al-Karim Qasim, Iraqi general, 24th Prime Minister of Iraq (executed) (b. 1914)
- February 11 – Sylvia Plath, American poet and novelist (b. 1932)
- February 15
  - Edgardo Donato, Uruguayan tango composer and orchestra leader (b. 1897)
  - Louis J. Gasnier, French film director (b. 1875)
  - Bump Hadley, Major League Baseball pitcher (b. 1904)
- February 16
  - Else Jarlbak, Danish film actress (b. 1911)
  - László Lajtha, Hungarian composer, ethnomusicologist and conductor (b. 1892)
- February 17 – Mijo Mirković, Croatian economist and author (b. 1898)
- February 18
  - Monte Blue, American actor (b. 1887)
  - Beppe Fenoglio, Italian fiction writer and partisan (b. 1887)
  - Fernando Tambroni, Italian politician and 36th Prime Minister of Italy (b. 1901)
  - Tokugawa Iemasa, Japanese politician, 17th head of the Tokugawa shogunate (b. 1884)
  - Zareh I, Armenian Catholicos of Cilicia (b. 1915)
- February 19 – Benny Moré, Cuban singer (b. 1919)
- February 20
  - Ferenc Fricsay, Hungarian conductor (b. 1914)
  - Jacob Gade, Danish violinist and composer (b. 1879)
  - Bill Hinchman, American baseball player (b. 1883)
- February 22 – Arthur Guy Empey, American soldier (in British service), author, screenwriter and actor (b. 1883)
- February 25 – Melville J. Herskovits, American anthropologist (b. 1895)
- February 28
  - Rajendra Prasad, Indian politician, 1st President of India (b. 1884)
  - Eppa Rixey, American baseball player (Cincinnati Reds) and a member of the MLB Hall of Fame (b. 1891)

=== March ===
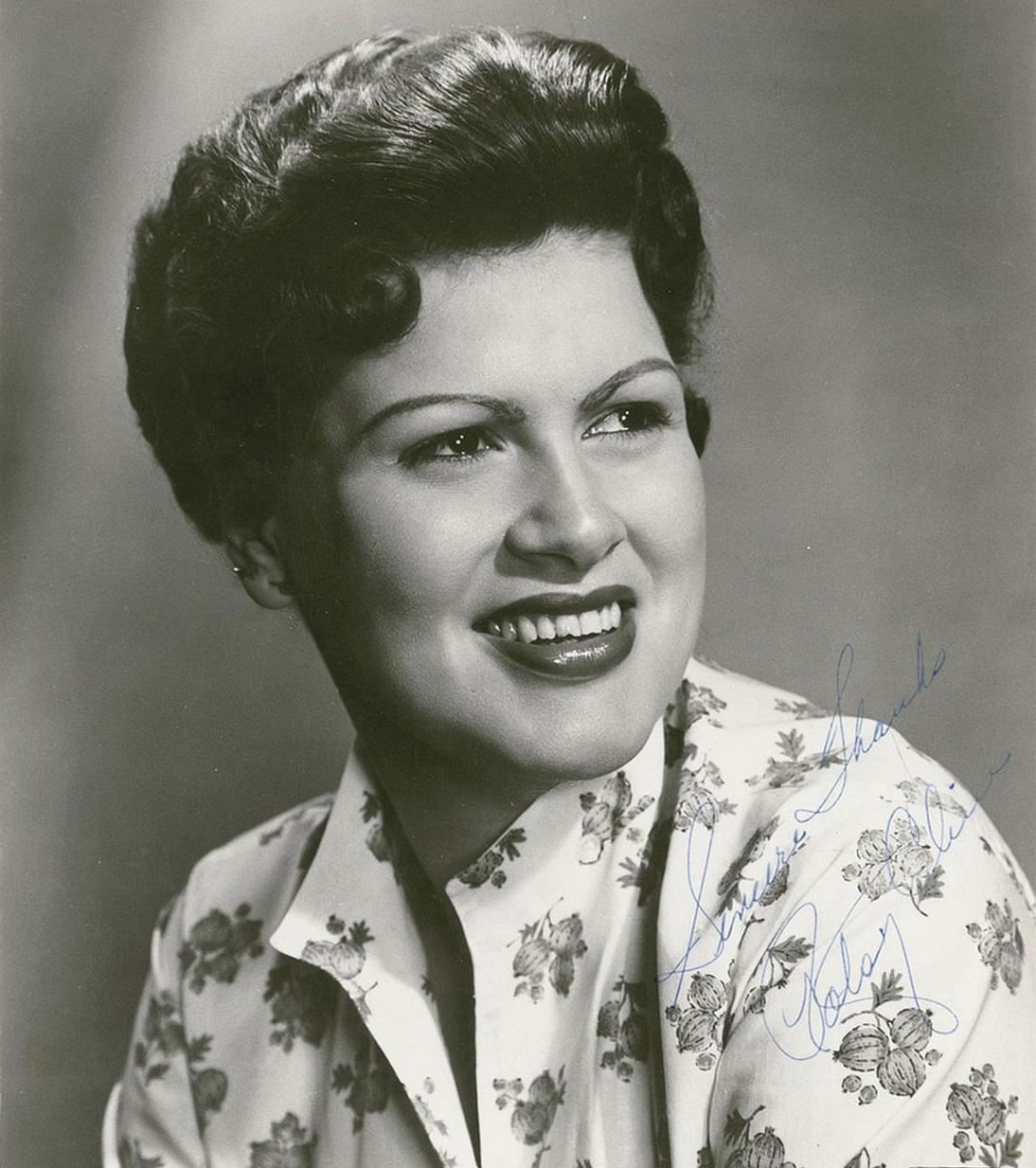
Patsy Cline

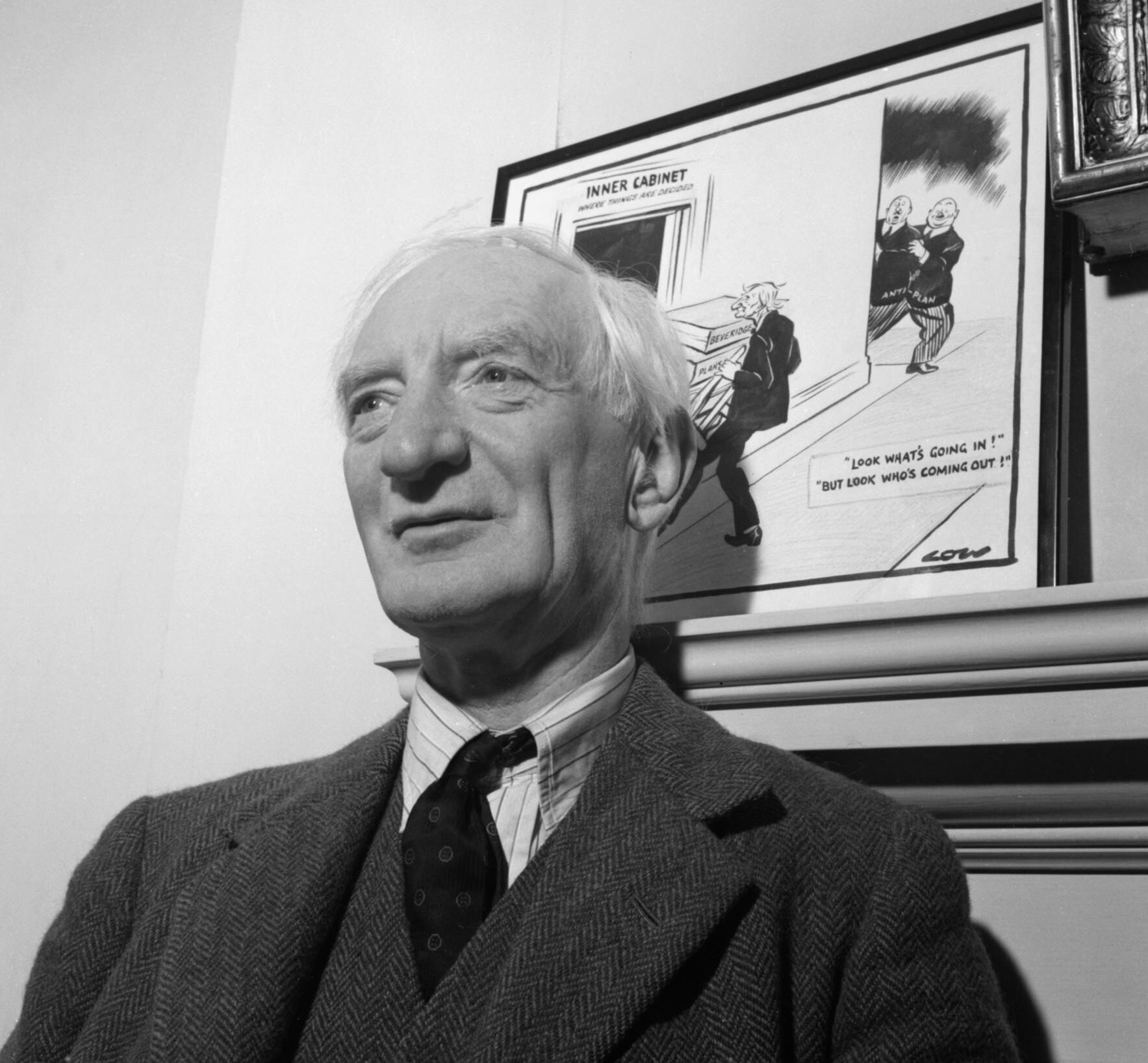
William Beveridge

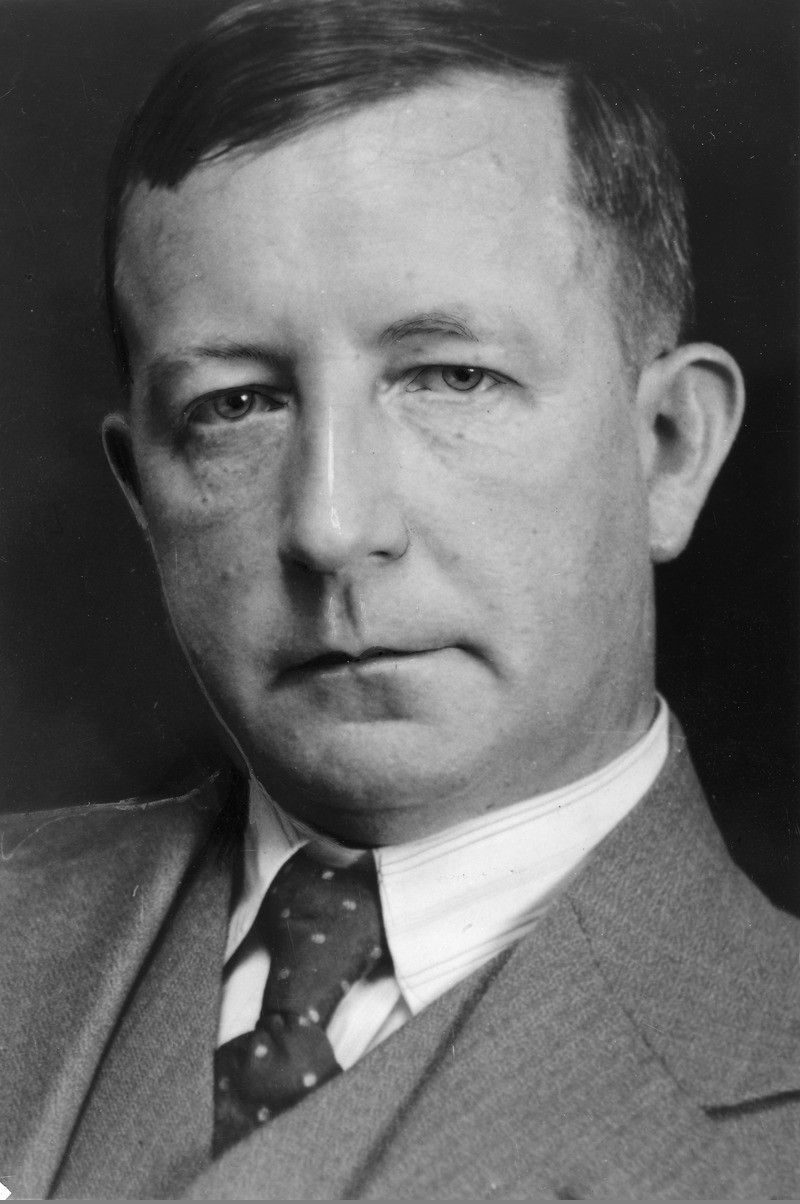
Thoralf Skolem

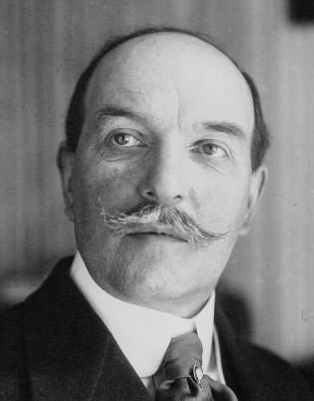
Henry Bordeaux

- March 1 – Irish Meusel, American baseball player (b. 1893)
- March 4 – William Carlos Williams, American poet (b. 1883)
- March 5
  - Patsy Cline, American singer (b. 1932)
  - Cowboy Copas, American singer (b. 1913)
  - Hawkshaw Hawkins, American singer (b. 1921)
  - Ludde Gentzel, Swedish film actor (b. 1885)
  - Cyril Smith, Scottish actor (b. 1892)
  - Ahmed Lutfi el-Sayed, Egyptian intellectual and anti-colonial activist (b. 1872)
- March 6 – Robert E. Cornish, scientist (b. 1903)
- March 7 – Joachim Holst-Jensen, Norwegian film actor (b. 1880)
- March 11
  - Ignat Bednarik, Romanian painter (b. 1882)
  - Joe Judge, American baseball player (b. 1894)
- March 15
  - Victor Feguer, convicted murderer (executed) (b. 1935)
- March 16
  - Archduchess Elisabeth Marie of Austria (b. 1883)
  - William Beveridge, British economist (b. 1879)
- March 17
  - Thomas Lennon, screenwriter (b. 1896)
  - Lizzie Miles, American blues singer (b. 1895)
- March 18
  - Sir Hubert Gough, British general (b. 1870)
  - Wanda Hawley, American actress (b. 1895)
- March 20 – Manuel Arteaga y Betancourt, Cuban Roman Catholic cardinal (b. 1879)
- March 21 – Felice Minotti, Italian film actor (b. 1887)
- March 22
  - Cilly Aussem, German tennis champion (b. 1909)
  - Abraham Ellstein, American composer (b. 1907)
  - Mihály Székely, Hungarian bass singer (b. 1901)
- March 23 – Thoralf Skolem, Norwegian mathematician (b. 1887)
- March 25 – Felix Adler, American screenwriter (b. 1884)
- March 27 – Harry Piel, German actor, film director, screenwriter and film producer (b. 1892)
- March 28
  - Antoine Balpêtré, French film actor (b. 1898)
  - Frank J. Marion, American motion picture pioneer (b. 1869)
- March 31
  - Harry Akst, American songwriter (b. 1894)
  - Sir Harold Franklyn, British army general (b. 1885)

=== April ===
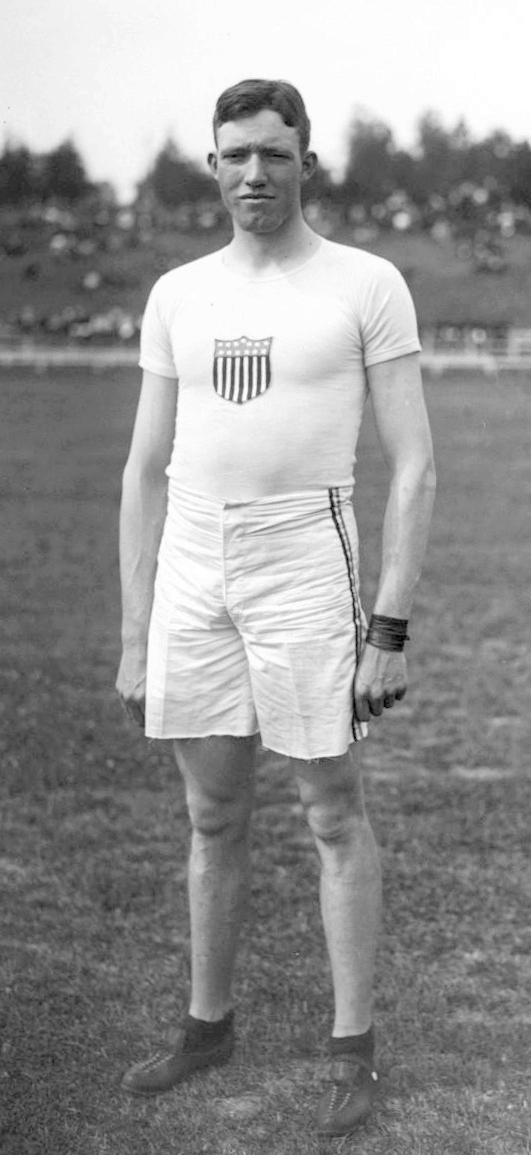
Alma Richards

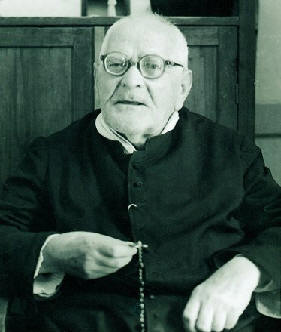
Saint Gaetano Catanoso

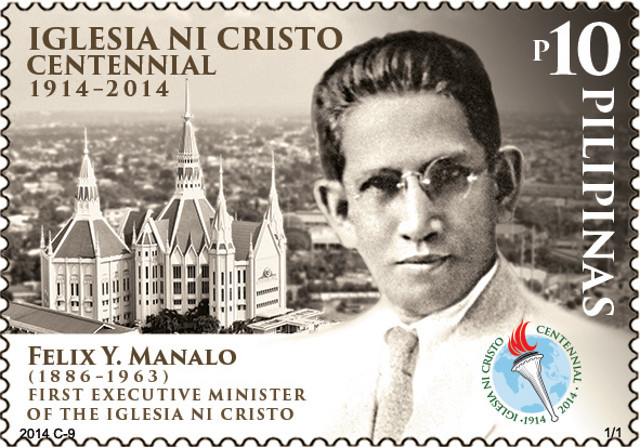
Felix Manalo

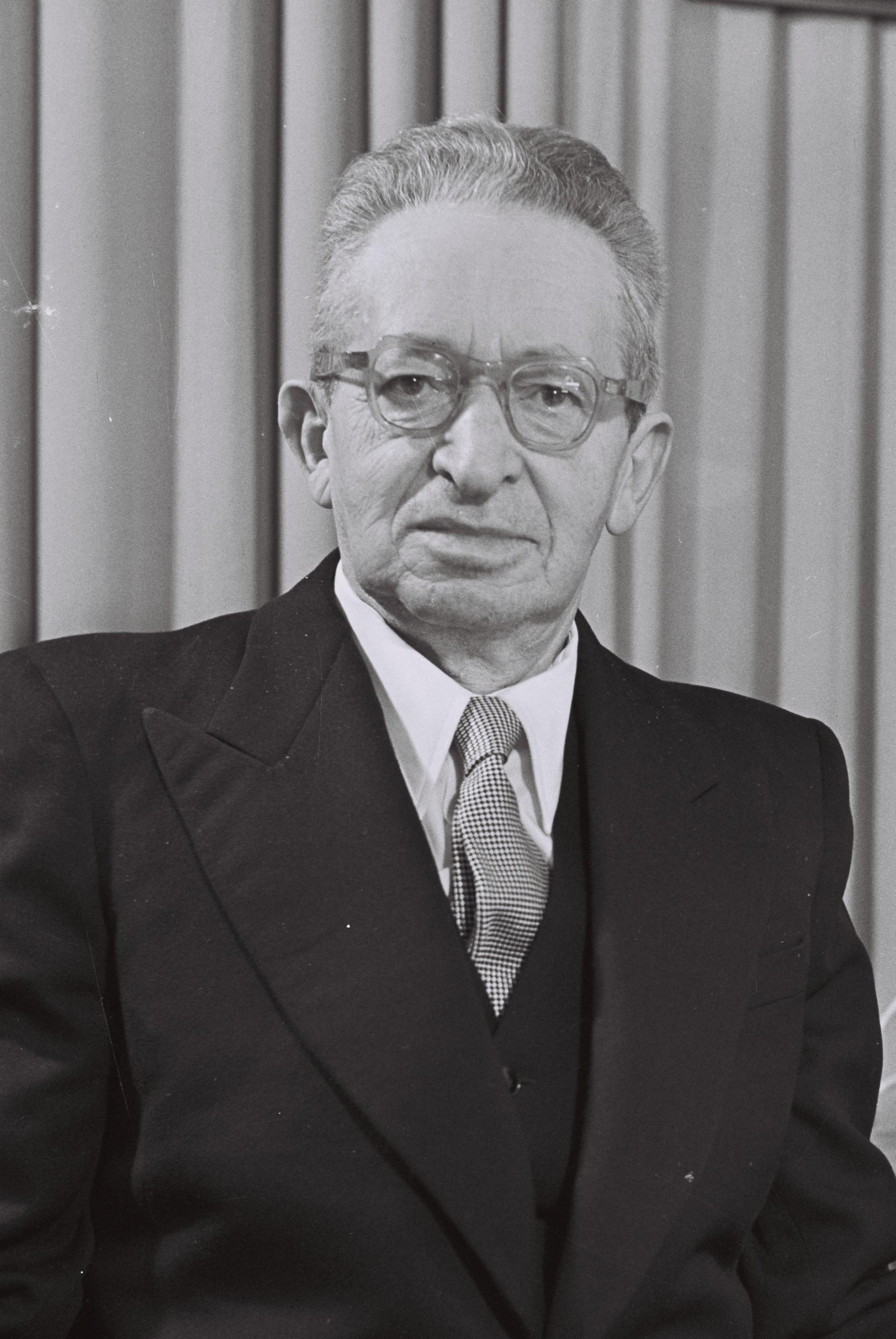
Yitzhak Ben-Zvi

- April 1 – Agnes Mowinckel, Norwegian actress and stage producer (b. 1875)
- April 3 – Alma Richards, American athlete (b. 1890)
- April 4
  - Gaetano Catanoso, Italian Roman Catholic priest and saint (b. 1879)
  - Jason Robards Sr., American stage and screen actor (b. 1892)
  - Oskari Tokoi, leader of the Social Democratic Party of Finland (b. 1873)
- April 5
  - Mario Fabrizi, English comedian and actor (b. 1924)
  - Tupua Tamasese Meaʻole, Samoan politician (b. 1905)
- April 6 – Otto Struve, Russian–born American astronomer (b. 1897)
- April 7 – Amedeo Maiuri, Italian archaeologist (b. 1886)
- April 8 – Irena Káňová, Slovak politician (b. 1893)
- April 9
  - Benno Moiseiwitsch, Jewish-Ukrainian pianist (b. 1890)
  - Xul Solar, Argentine painter, sculptor and writer (b. 1887)
- April 11 – Nando Bruno, Italian film actor (b. 1895)
- April 12
  - Nicolette Bruining, Dutch theologian and humanitarian (b. 1886)
  - Felix Manalo, 1st Executive Minister, Iglesia ni Cristo (b. 1886)
  - Herbie Nichols, American jazz pianist and composer (b. 1919)
- April 14
  - Abdel Messih El-Makari, Egyptian Coptic Orthodox monk, priest and saint (b. 1892)
  - Arthur Jonath, German Olympic athlete (b. 1909)
  - Rahul Sankrityayan, Indian historian, writer and scholar (b. 1893)
- April 23
  - Yitzhak Ben-Zvi, Israel historian and politician, 2nd President of Israel (b. 1884)
  - Ferruccio Cerio, Italian film writer and director (b. 1904)
  - Paul Fejos, Hungarian film director (b. 1897)
  - Harry Harper, American baseball player (b. 1895)
  - Don C. Harvey, American television and film actor (b. 1911)
  - Frederick Peters, American film actor (b. 1884)
  - William Lewis Moore, American postal worker (b. 1927)
- April 24
  - Rino Corso Fougier, Italian air force general (b. 1894)
  - Leonid Lukov, Soviet film director and screenwriter (b. 1909)
- April 26 – Roland Pertwee, English playwright, screenwriter, director and actor (b. 1885)
- April 27 – Kenneth Macgowan, American film producer (b. 1888)
- April 30
  - Giovanni Grasso, Italian film actor (b. 1888)
  - William C. Mellor, American cinematographer (b. 1903)
  - Bryant Washburn, American film actor (b. 1889)

=== May ===
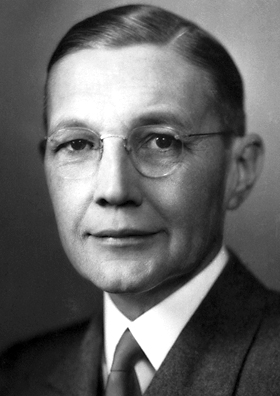
Herbert Spencer Gasser

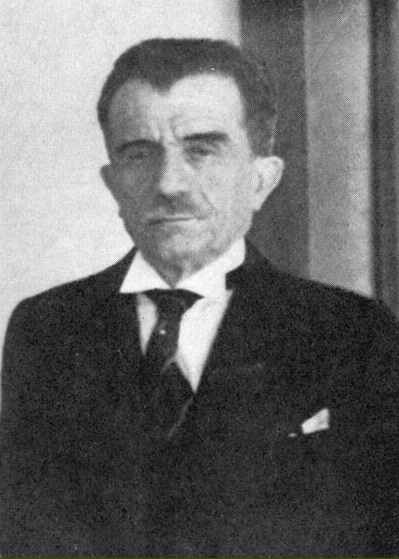
Mehdi Frashëri

- May 1 – Lope K. Santos, Filipino writer, Father of Philippine National Language and Grammar (b. 1879)
- May 2 – Van Wyck Brooks, American literary critic and writer (b. 1886)
- May 5 – Mohamed Khemisti, Minister of Foreign Affairs of Algeria (assassinated) (b. 1930)
- May 6
  - Theodore von Kármán, Hungarian-American engineer and physicist (b. 1881)
  - Monty Woolley, American actor (b. 1888)
- May 11 – Herbert Spencer Gasser, American physiologist, Nobel Prize laureate (b. 1888)
- May 12
  - Robert Kerr, Canadian Olympic athlete (b. 1882)
  - A. W. Tozer, American Protestant pastor (b. 1897)
- May 16 – Oleg Penkovsky, Soviet military officer & spy (b. 1919)
- May 18 – Ernie Davis, American football player, first African-American to win the Heisman Trophy (b. 1939)
- May 24 – Elmore James, American blues guitarist (b. 1918)
- May 25 – Mehdi Frashëri, Albanian politician, 15th Prime Minister of Albania (b. 1872)
- May 28 – Ion Agârbiceanu, Romanian writer, journalist, politician and priest (b. 1882)
- May 29 – Netta Muskett, British novelist (b. 1887)
- May 31 – Edith Hamilton, German-American classical scholar (b. 1867)

=== June ===
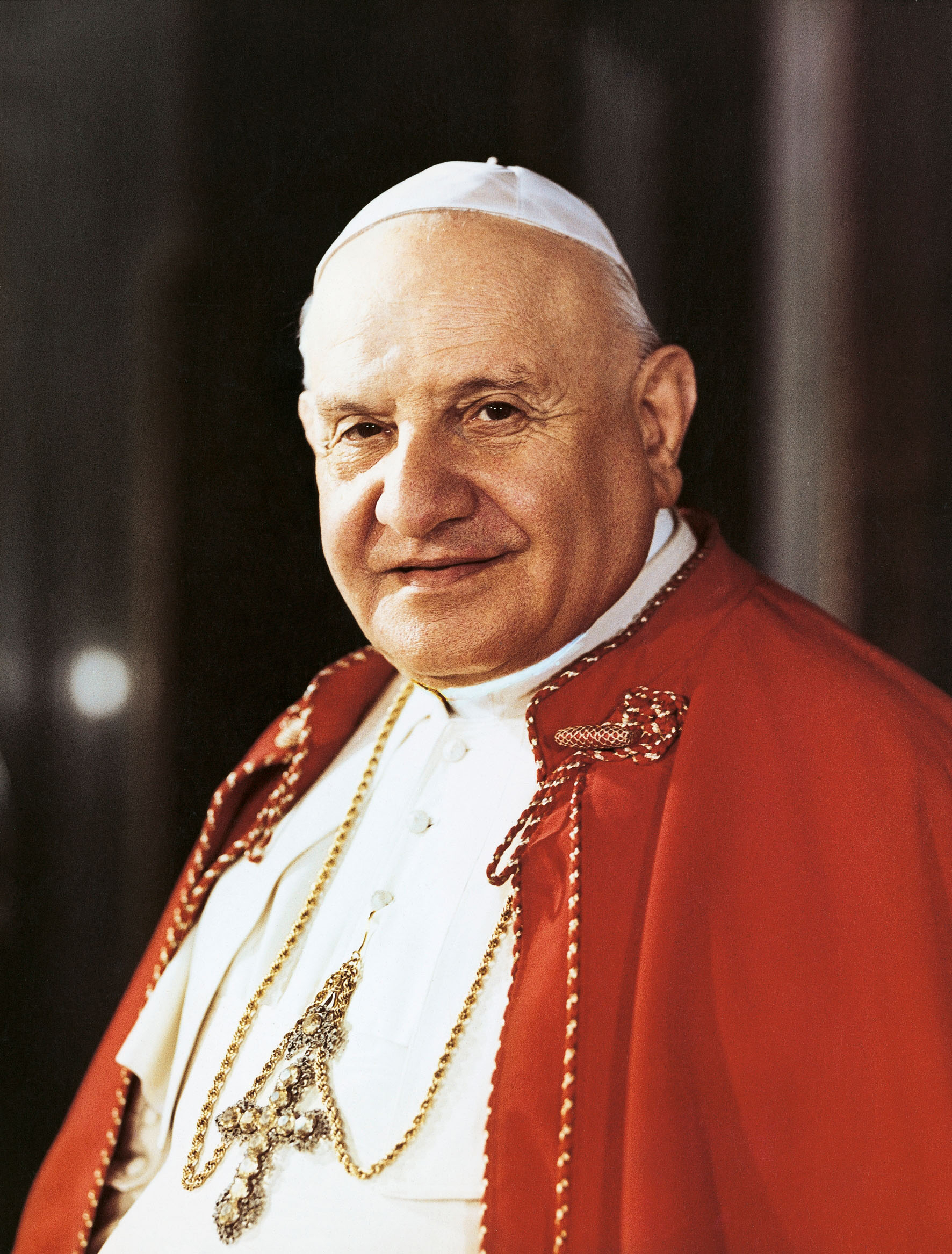
Pope John XXIII

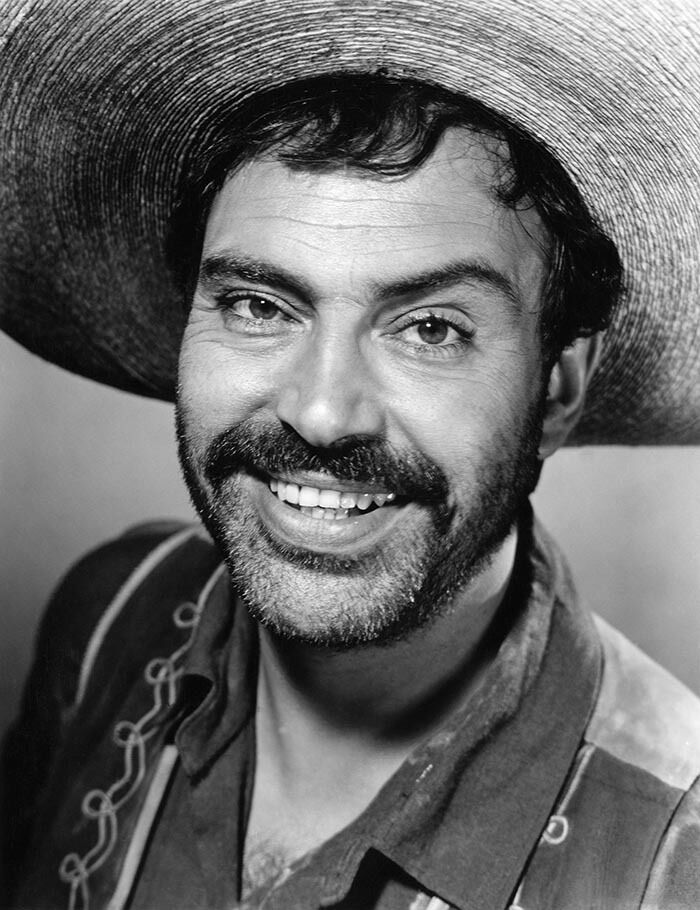
Pedro Armendáriz

- June 3
  - Pope John XXIII (b. 1881)
  - Nâzım Hikmet, Turkish poet (b. 1902)
- June 5 – Adrian Carton de Wiart, English general (b. 1880)
- June 6 – William Baziotes, American painter (b. 1912)
- June 7 – ZaSu Pitts, American actress (b. 1894)
- June 9 – Jacques Villon, French painter (b. 1875)
- June 10 – Anita King, American actress and race-car driver (b. 1884)
- June 11
  - Thích Quảng Đức, Vietnamese Buddhist monk (suicide) (b. 1897)
  - Syed Abdul Rahim, First Indian national football manager (b. 1909)
  - Alfred V. Kidder, American archaeologist (b. 1885)
- June 12
  - Medgar Evers, American civil rights activist (b. 1925)
  - Andrew Cunningham, British admiral (b. 1883)
- June 17
  - Alan Brooke, 1st Viscount Alanbrooke, British Field Marshal (b. 1883)
  - John Cowper Powys, British novelist (b. 1872)
- June 18 – Pedro Armendáriz, Mexican actor (b. 1912)
- June 24 – Maria Guadalupe Garcia Zavala, Mexican Roman Catholic religious professed and saint (b. 1878)
- June 27 – John Maurice Clark, American economist (b. 1884)
- June 28 – Frank Baker, American baseball player (Philadelphia Athletics) and a member of the MLB Hall of Fame (b. 1886)

=== July ===
- July 1 – Sultan Abdullah bin Khalifa of Zanzibar (b. 1910)
- July 4 – Bernard Freyberg, 1st Baron Freyberg, British army general and Governor-General of New Zealand (b. 1889)
- July 6 – George, Duke of Mecklenburg, head of the House of Mecklenburg-Strelitz (b. 1899)
- July 7 – Frank P. Lahm, American aviator (b. 1877)
- July 10 – Ezz El-Dine Zulficar, Egyptian filmmaker (b. 1919)
- July 11 - Jeanne Guiot, French engineer and metallurgist.
- July 22 – Albertus Soegijapranata, Indonesian Jesuit priest (b. 1896)
- July 27 – Garrett Morgan, American inventor (b. 1877)

=== August ===
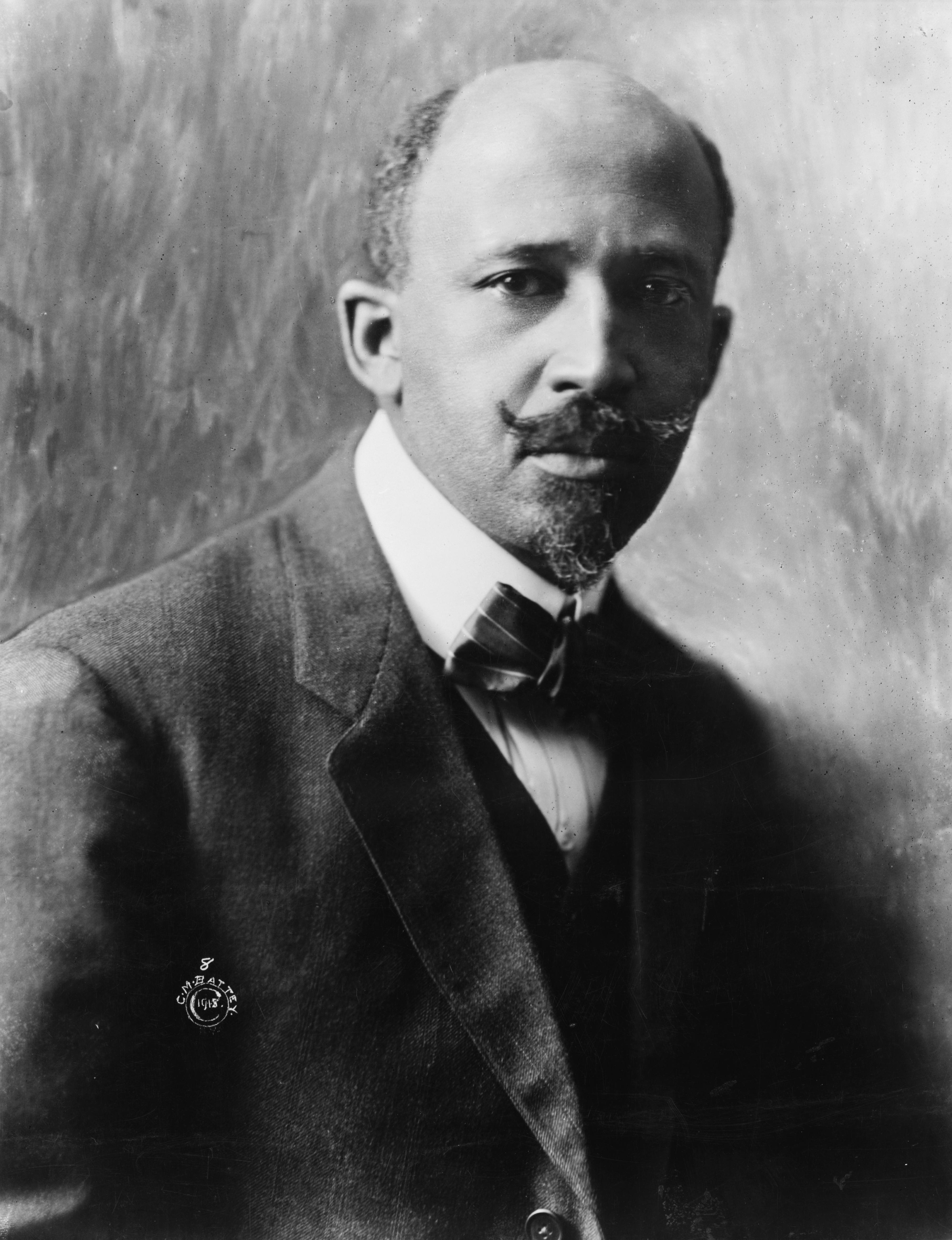
W. E. B. Du Bois

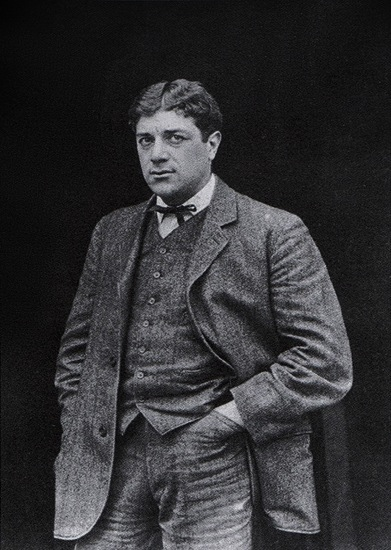
Georges Braque

- August 1 – Theodore Roethke, American poet (b. 1908)
- August 4 – Tom Keene, American actor (b. 1896)
- August 9 – Patrick Bouvier Kennedy, infant son of president John F. Kennedy (b. 1963)
- August 10 – Estes Kefauver, American politician (b. 1903)
- August 11
  - Clem Bevans, American actor (b. 1880)
  - Tanxu, Chinese Buddhist monk (b. 1875)
- August 14 – Clifford Odets, American dramatist (b. 1906)
- August 15, Eddie Lee Mays (executed) (b. 1929)
- August 17 – Richard Barthelmess, American actor (b. 1895)
- August 22 – William Morris, 1st Viscount Nuffield, British businessman and philanthropist (b. 1877)
- August 23
  - Mary Gordon, Scottish actress (b. 1882)
  - Larry Keating, American actor (b. 1899)
- August 24 – James Kirkwood, Sr., American film director (b. 1875)
- August 27
  - W. E. B. Du Bois, American civil rights activist (b. 1868)
  - Inayatullah Khan Mashriqi, Indian founder of the Khaksar Movement (b. 1888)
- August 30 – Guy Burgess, British spy, one of the Cambridge Five (b. 1911)
- August 31 – Georges Braque, French painter (b. 1882)

=== September ===
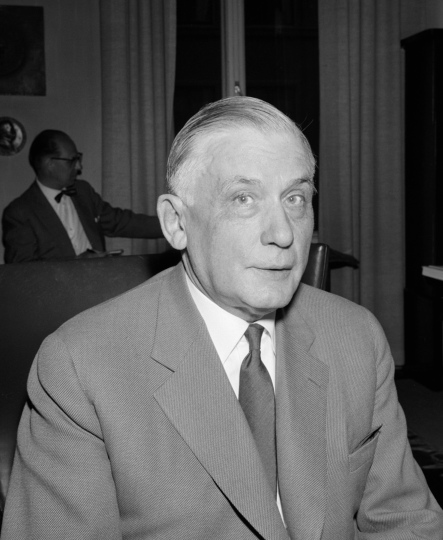
Edwin Linkomies

- September 2 – Tikiri Bandara Panabokke II, Ceylonese legislator, lawyer and diplomat (b. 1883)
- September 3 – Louis MacNeice, Northern Irish poet (b. 1907)
- September 4 – Robert Schuman, French statesman, a founding father of the European Union (b. 1886)
- September 9 – Edwin Linkomies, 25th Prime Minister of Finland (b. 1894)
- September 11
  - Suzanne Duchamp, French painter (b. 1889)
  - Richard Oswald, Austrian director, producer and screenwriter (b. 1880)
- September 15 – Oliver Wallace, English film composer (b. 1887)
- September 17
  - Sailor Malan, South African Battle of Britain fighter pilot (b. 1910)
  - Eduard Spranger, German philosopher and psychologist (b. 1882)
- September 19 – Sir David Low, New Zealand cartoonist (b. 1891)
- September 22 – Bernadette Cattanéo, French trade unionist and communist activist (b. 1899)
- September 25
  - Alexander Sakharoff, Russian dancer and choreographer (b. 1886)
  - Kurt Zeitzler, German Army officer (b. 1895)

=== October ===
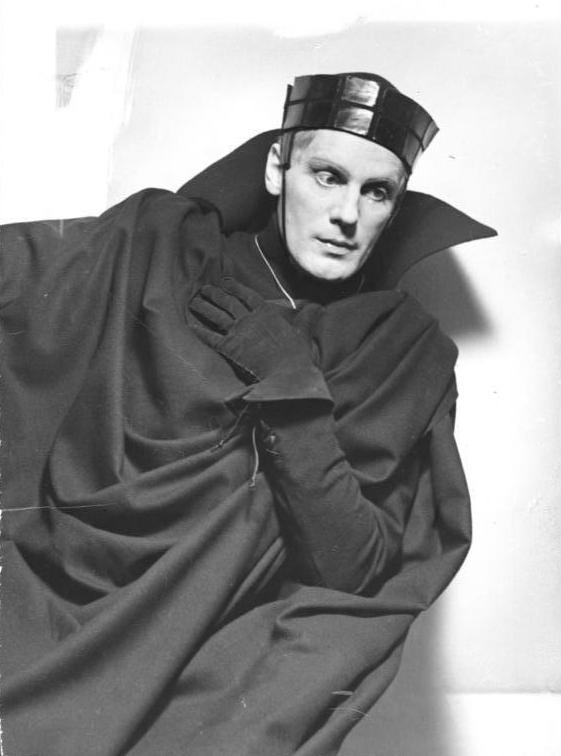
Gustaf Gründgens

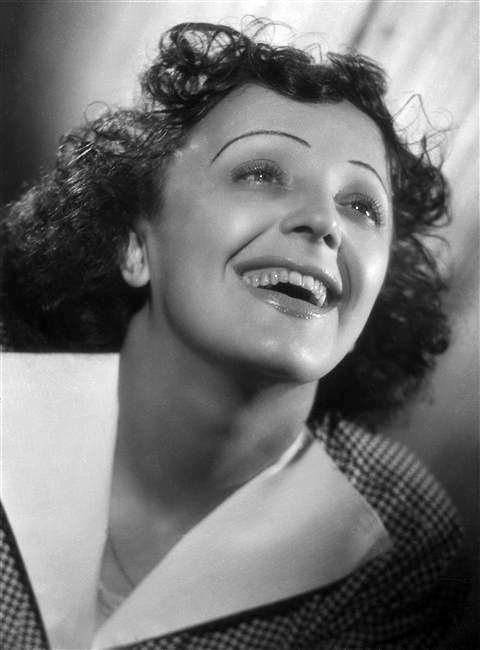
Édith Piaf

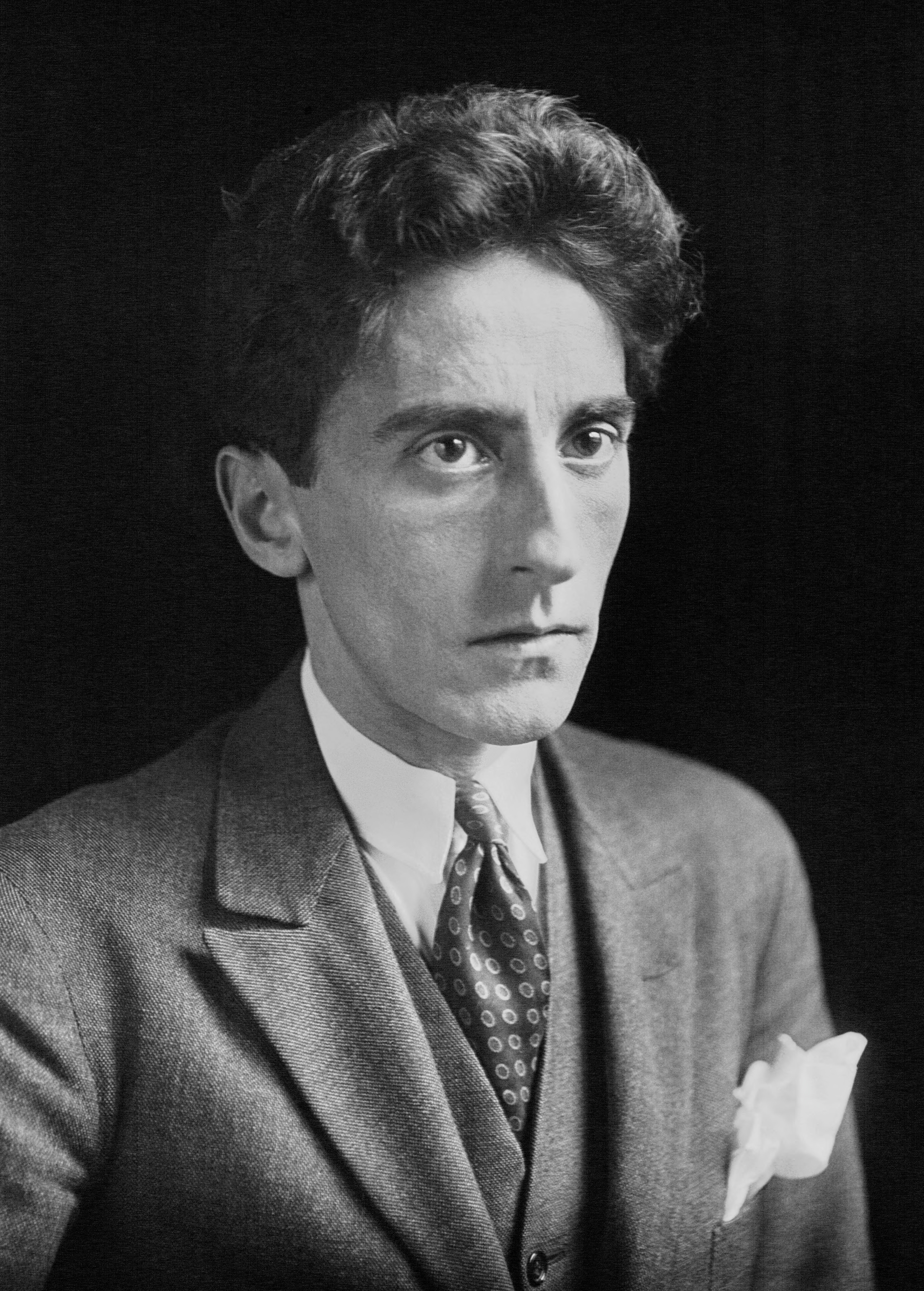
Jean Cocteau

- October 4 – Lloyd Fredendall, American general (b. 1883)
- October 7 – Gustaf Gründgens, German actor (b. 1899)
- October 8 – Grace Darmond, Canadian-born American actress (b. 1893)
- October 9 – Friedrich, Hereditary Prince of Anhalt (b. 1938)
- October 10 – Édith Piaf, French singer and actress (b. 1915)
- October 11 – Jean Cocteau, French fiction writer and film director (b. 1889)
- October 15 – Alan Goodrich Kirk, American admiral (b. 1888)
- October 21 – Jean Decoux, French admiral, Governor-General of French Indochina (1940–1945) (b. 1884)
- October 24
  - Karl Bühler, German psychologist and linguist (b. 1879)
  - Beverly Wills, American actress (b. 1933)
- October 25
  - Björn Þórðarson, 9th Prime Minister of Iceland (b. 1879)
  - Karl von Terzaghi, Austrian civil engineer and "father of soil mechanics" (b. 1883)
- October 29 – Adolphe Menjou, American actor (b. 1890)
- October 30
  - Hugh O'Flaherty, Irish Catholic priest (b. 1898)
  - Domhnall Ua Buachalla, Irish politician (b. 1866)
- October 31 – Henry Daniell, English actor (b. 1894)

=== November ===
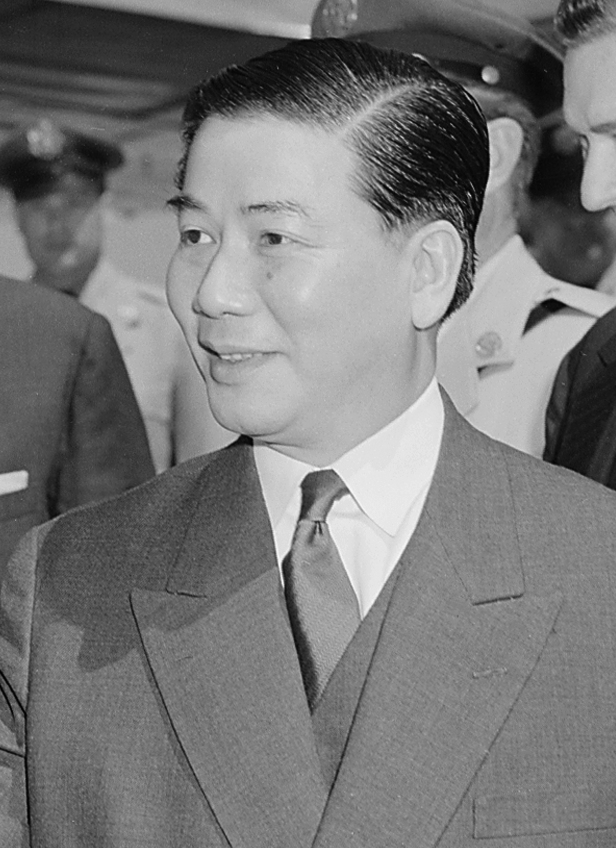
Ngô Đình Diệm

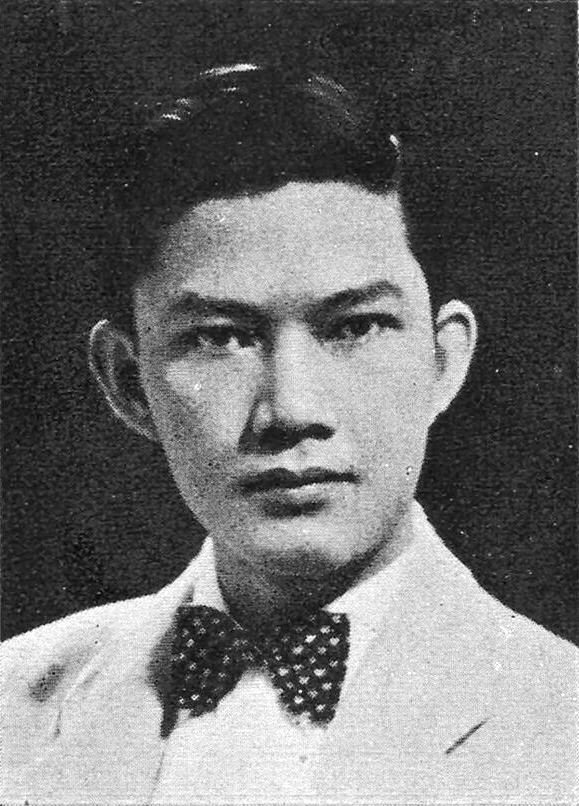
Ngô Đình Nhu

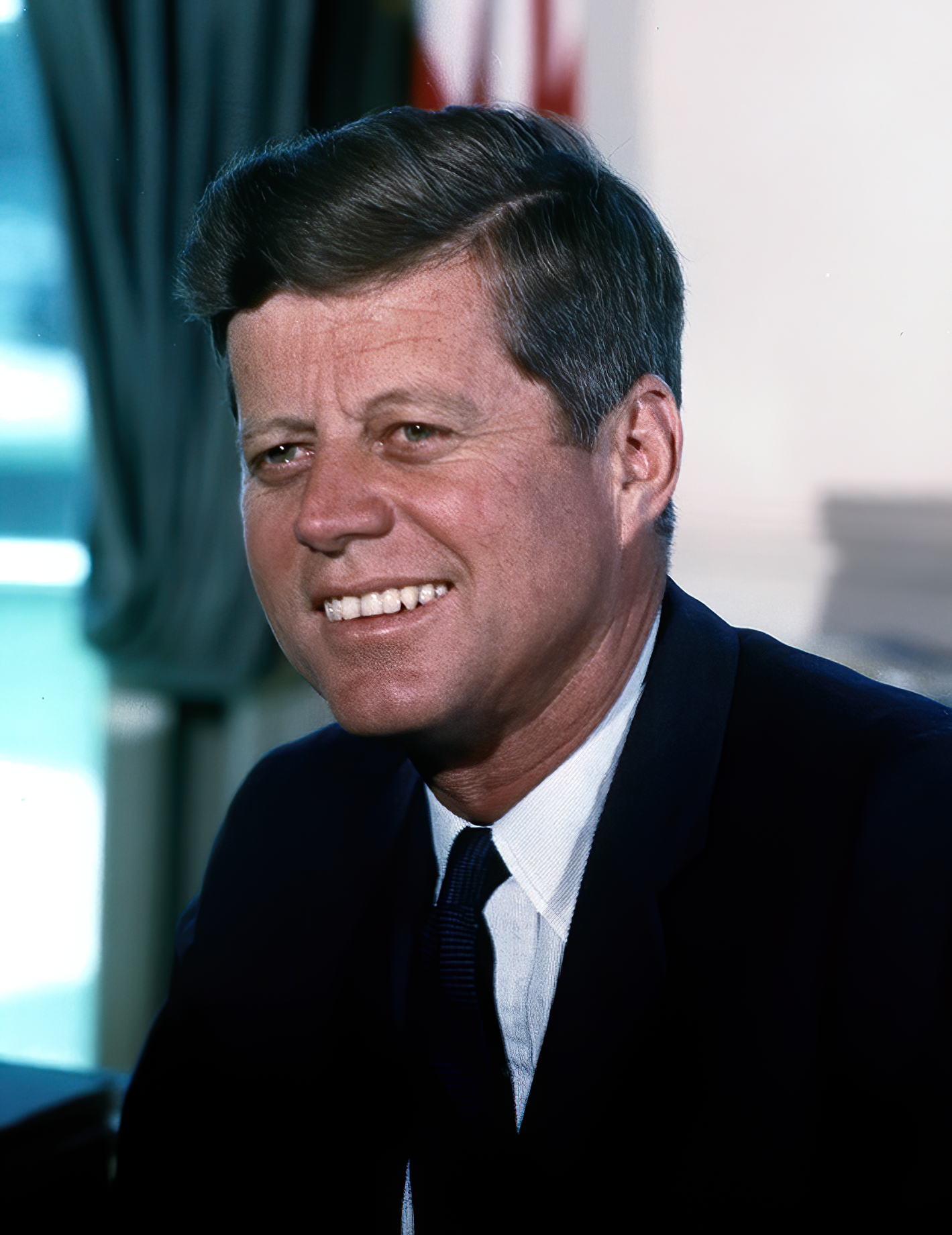
John F. Kennedy

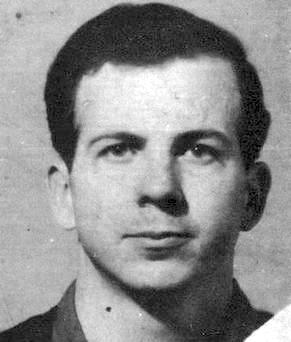
Lee Harvey Oswald

- November 1
  - Hồ Tấn Quyền, South Vietnamese Navy officer (assassinated) (b. 1927)
  - Lê Quang Tung, South Vietnamese Army officer (assassinated) (b. 1923)
  - Elsa Maxwell, American gossip columnist and hostess (b. 1883)
- November 2
  - Ngô Đình Diệm, South Vietnamese politician, 1st President of the Republic of Vietnam (South Vietnam) (assassinated) (b. 1901)
  - Ngô Đình Nhu, South Vietnamese politician, State Counsellor of South Vietnam (assassinated) (b. 1910)
- November 4 – Pascual Ortiz Rubio, Mexican politician, substitute President of Mexico 1930–1932 (b. 1877)
- November 5 – Luis Cernuda, Spanish poet (b. 1902)
- November 12
  - José María Gatica, Argentine boxer (b. 1925)
  - John R. Hodge, United States Army general (b. 1893)
  - Georg Karo, German archaeologist (b. 1872)
- November 15 – Fritz Reiner, Hungarian conductor (b. 1888)
- November 19 – Carmen Amaya, Spanish dancer (b. 1918)
- November 21 – Robert Stroud, American prisoner, known as the "Birdman of Alcatraz" (b. 1890)
- November 22
  - Wilhelm Beiglböck, German Nazi physician at Dachau concentration camp (b. 1905)
  - Aldous Huxley, English-born novelist (Brave New World) (b. 1894)
  - John F. Kennedy, American politician, 35th President of the United States (assassinated) (b. 1917)
  - C. S. Lewis, Irish-born British critic, novelist (The Chronicles of Narnia) and Christian apologist (b. 1898)
  - J. D. Tippit, American police officer (b. 1924)
- November 23 – John Baumgarten, American businessman and politician (b. 1902)
- November 24
  - Clelia Lollini, Italian physician (b. 1890)
  - Lee Harvey Oswald, American assassin of President John F. Kennedy (murdered) (b. 1939)
- November 26 – Amelita Galli-Curci, Italian opera singer (b. 1882)
- November 28 – Karyn Kupcinet, American actress (b. 1941)
- November 29 – Ernesto Lecuona, Cuban composer (b. 1896)
- November 30
  - Phil Baker, American comedian and radio personality (b. 1896)
  - Cyril Newall, 1st Baron Newall, British Air Marshal and State servant, 6th Governor-General of New Zealand (b. 1886)

=== December ===
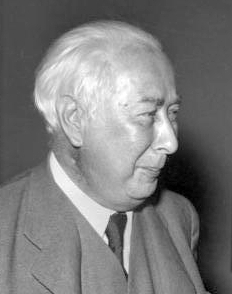
Theodor Heuss

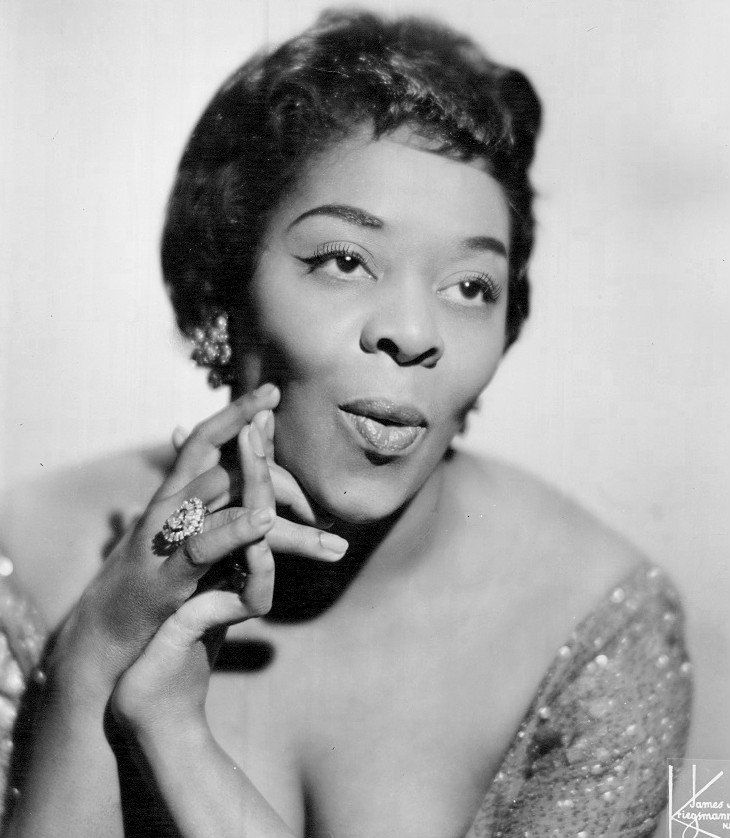
Dinah Washington

- December 2
  - Sabu Dastagir, Indian-American actor (b. 1924)
  - Thomas Hicks, American runner (b. 1875)
- December 5 – Karl Amadeus Hartmann, German composer (b. 1905)
- December 10 – K. M. Panikkar, Indian scholar, diplomat and journalist (b. 1895)
- December 12
  - Theodor Heuss, German politician, 5th President of Germany (b. 1884)
  - Yasujirō Ozu, Japanese filmmaker (b. 1903)
- December 14
  - Hubert Pierlot, Belgian lawyer and jurist, 32nd Prime Minister of Belgium, leader of the Belgian government in exile (b. 1883)
  - Dinah Washington, American jazz/blues singer (b. 1924)
- December 15 – Rikidōzan, Korean-born Japanese professional wrestler (b. 1924)
- December 21 – Sir Jack Hobbs, English cricketer (b. 1882)
- December 25 – Tristan Tzara, French poet (b. 1896)
- December 26 – Gorgeous George, American professional wrestler (b. 1915)
- December 28
  - Paul Hindemith, German composer (b. 1895)
  - A. J. Liebling, American journalist (b. 1904)

== Nobel Prizes ==

- Physics – Eugene Wigner, Maria Goeppert-Mayer and J. Hans D. Jensen
- Chemistry – Karl Ziegler and Giulio Natta
- Physiology or Medicine – Sir John Carew Eccles, Alan Lloyd Hodgkin and Andrew Huxley
- Literature – Giorgos Seferis
- Peace – International Committee of the Red Cross, League of Red Cross Societies
