= Acapulco Gold (disambiguation) =

Acapulco Gold is a strain of cannabis.

Acapulco Gold may also refer to:

== Music ==
- "Acapulco Gold" (Paul Horn Quintet), a 1966 jazz song
- That Acapulco Gold, a 1967 psychedelic pop album

- "That Acapulco Gold" (song), a song from the album

- "Acapulco Gold Filters", a 1971 Cheech & Chong song
- "Acapulco Gold" (Roy Harper song), a 1974 rock song
- "Acapulco Gold" (Soulwax song), a song from the 1996 album Leave the Story Untold

== Other uses ==
- Acapulco Gold (1976 film)
- Acapulco Gold (2004 film)
- Acapulco Gold (clothing brand)

== See also ==
- "Acapulco Goldie", a rock song
