= Burger Chef murders =

1978 quadruple homicide case

Coordinates: 39.79593°N 86.26161°W

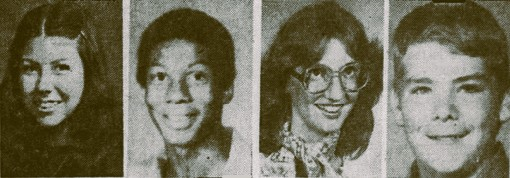
- From left to right: Jayne Friedt, Mark Flemmonds, Ruth Shelton, and Daniel Davis
- Location: Speedway, Indiana, U.S.
- Date: November 17, 1978 c. 11:00 pm
- Attack type: Attempted robbery, kidnapping, mass murder
- Weapons: Firearm, knife, blunt object
- Deaths: 4
- Perpetrator: Unknown
- No. of participants: 2 or more

On the night of Friday, November 17, 1978, four young employees at a Burger Chef restaurant in Speedway, Indiana, went missing in what was initially thought to be a petty theft of cash from the restaurant's safe. By Saturday morning it became a clear case of robbery-kidnapping, and by Sunday, when their bodies were discovered, a case of murder. While investigators believe they have identified some or all of the perpetrators, without physical evidence they have not been able to prosecute those who remain alive.

== Suspected robbery and homicides ==
Location of Speedway in Marion County, Indiana

Between 11:00 pm (closing time) and midnight (23:00 and 00:00 EST) on November 17, 1978, four employees of the Burger Chef restaurant at 5725 Crawfordsville Road disappeared: assistant manager Jayne Friedt, 20; Daniel Davis, 16; Mark Flemmonds, 16; and Ruth Ellen Shelton, 17. A fellow employee who came by at midnight to visit the four noticed that the restaurant was empty, the safe was open, and the back door ajar. Police found two empty currency bags and an empty roll of adhesive tape next to the open safe.

Police did not initially consider the case to be serious, given that management reported the loss of only approximately 581 United States dollars ($USD) (equivalent to $2,868 in 2025) from the safe and no clear signs of a struggle. It was thought to be a case of petty theft, with the assumption that the pilfered cash had been used by the youths to go partying that night. More than US$100 in coins was left in the registers. Although the purses and jackets of the missing women had been left at the shop, the police nevertheless believed their theft theory was most likely and the scene was cleaned by employees early Saturday morning.

Buddy Ellwanger, a Speedway police officer who was eventually assigned to the case, admitted "we screwed it up from the beginning". Not only was the restaurant cleaned and allowed to be reopened, but no photographs were taken beforehand, effectively eliminating all potential evidence at the crime scene.

When the four did not reappear the following morning and Friedt's Chevrolet Vega was found partially locked in town, concerns grew. It became evident that the youths had been abducted while closing the restaurant for the night, with the attack possibly beginning as they removed trash bags out the back door.

On Sunday afternoon, hikers found the bodies of all four youths over 20 mi (32 km) away, in a wooded area of Johnson County. Both Davis and Shelton had been shot numerous times with a .38 caliber firearm. Friedt had been stabbed twice in the chest. The handle of the knife had broken off and was missing; the blade was later recovered during an autopsy. Flemmonds was later determined to have been bludgeoned — possibly with a chain — and died from choking to death on his own blood. All four victims were still wearing their Burger Chef uniforms. Money and watches were found on the dead victims, implying that robbery might not have been the sole motive for the murders.

The leading theory of investigators has been that the four victims were kidnapped during a botched robbery, possibly after one of the victims recognized one of the perpetrators. Flemmonds was covering for another employee's shift and was not scheduled to work that night, leading investigators to speculate that perhaps he was the one who recognized the killers since they had not planned on him being there.

== Eyewitness sightings ==
On the night of the murders, a 16-year-old eyewitness saw two suspicious men in a car outside the Burger Chef just before closing. Both men were white and in their thirties. One man had a beard; the other was clean-shaven with light-colored ("fair") hair. The police had models of the suspects created in clay to assist the investigation.

== Initial investigations ==
Later in 1978, a man in a bar in Greenwood bragged that he had been involved in the killings. Police subsequently questioned him, but he passed a polygraph claiming not to have been involved; officers were unable to bring charges on other grounds. The man provided the names of others who he suggested belonged to a fast-food robbery gang, who investigators suspected may have been involved in the case.

While following up on these leads in Franklin, officers spotted a man who bore a strong resemblance to the "bearded man" composite. Summoned for a lineup, the man shaved his beard (which he had had for the previous five years) the night before he was to appear. A neighbor of his, who had not been spotted by the original witness but who had been named by the Greenwood suspect, subsequently went to prison for armed robbery. Another associate named by the Greenwood suspect, who fit the description of the fair-haired man, also subsequently was imprisoned for other armed robberies of fast-food restaurants. However, without confessions — despite offers of plea deals to any suspects not directly responsible for the killings — and without direct physical evidence of the involvement of the suspects in the murders, the police were not able to make arrests.

At the time, there was some speculation that the murders were tied to other crimes that had shocked the town over the preceding months, such as the murder of Julia Scyphers and the Speedway bombings. At the time the perpetrator of the bombings was still on the loose. However, these cases were subsequently found to be unconnected to the Burger Chef murders.

== Later investigations ==
Investigators continued to follow leads relating to possible suspects as widely as Cincinnati, Milwaukee, Chicago and Dallas. However, they were not able to find any more promising leads or to locate the evidence they believed would have been most useful: the firearm, the handle of the knife, and the chain used in the murders. No perpetrators have made confessions to police, though the son of the bearded suspect told police that the suspect had confided in him that he had been involved, prior to his own death. Ken York, one of the original investigators on the case, has noted that the deaths of the Greenwood suspect and the bearded suspect, from an apparent suicide, and a heart attack, respectively, came suspiciously close after the release of the armed robber named by the Greenwood suspect.

In 1984, Detective Mel Willsey of the Marion County Sheriff's Department received a call from Donald Forrester, an inmate at the Pendleton Correctional Facility. Forrester claimed to have been involved in the murders and was willing to confess in order to avoid his scheduled transfer to a notoriously violent state prison. Willsey received a court order to bring Forrester to Marion County, where he confessed to shooting Davis and Shelton. He then led police to the crime scene in the woods, where he accurately described the location and position of the bodies when they were found. He also knew about the broken handle of the knife, which was not widely publicized.

According to Forrester, Friedt's brother James owed money on a drug deal, so he and three other associates had gone to the restaurant to threaten her, but when Flemmonds intervened to protect Friedt, a fight broke out, during which Flemmonds fell and hit his head on the bumper of a car. Believing he was dead or dying, Forrester and his accomplices decided to abduct and kill all the employees to eliminate all the witnesses to their crime.

Forrester claimed to have shot Davis and Shelton, and gave the names of three men he claimed were responsible for killing Flemmonds and Friedt. He then led the police to a spot where he claimed he had thrown the gun into a river. However, a thorough search of the river did not find any weapon. Willsey interviewed Forrester's ex-wife, who said that he had driven with her out to a wooded area shortly after the murders and retrieved several shell casings, which he then flushed down the toilet.

Willsey then got a warrant to search the septic tank of the house, which turned up several spent .38 caliber shell casings. After someone within the sheriff's office leaked details of Forrester's cooperation, he suddenly recanted his confession and claimed it was coerced. With no further cooperation from Forrester and no direct evidence proving he committed the murders, Forrester was never charged. He died in prison from cancer in 2006 at age 55.

Despite thousands of hours of police investigation, as well as Burger Chef offering a reward of $25,000 to anyone who could capture the murderers or provide information about their whereabouts, the attackers were never prosecuted, and the case remains officially unsolved. The Indiana State Police continue to keep the case open, and have reportedly investigated the use of DNA-tracing techniques developed since the initial investigations.

== Memorials ==
During the summer of 2018, the Speedway community, as well as family and friends of the victims, raised money to plant four red oak trees to honor the victims. Each tree is adorned with a plaque with a short biography of one of the victims. The original monetary goal was surpassed within 24 hours. With the extra funds, a marble bench was installed and dedicated to their family and friends. On November 10, 2018, one week before the fortieth anniversary, a small dedication ceremony for family and friends was held at the memorial site at Leonard Park in Speedway.

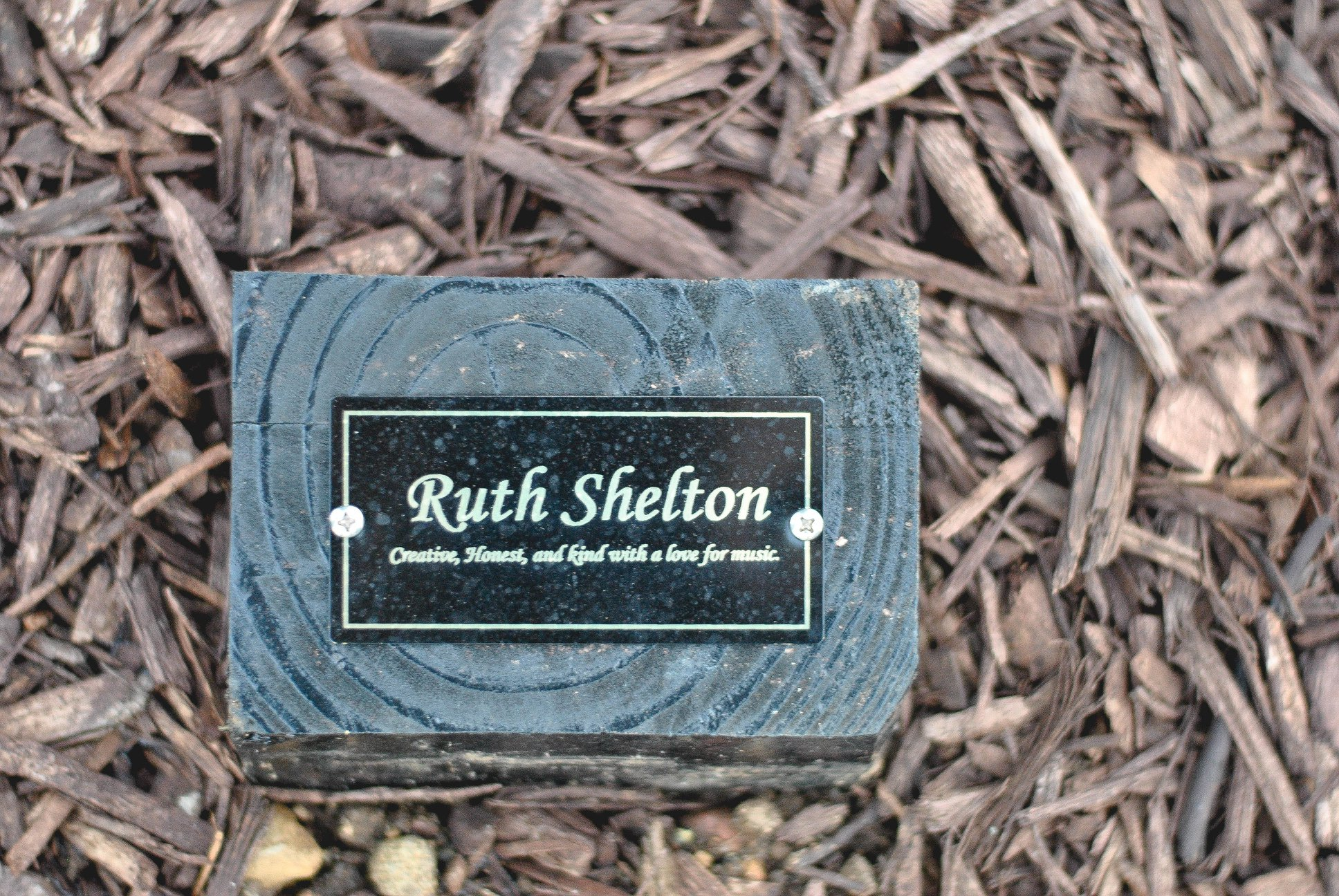
Plaque honoring Ruth Shelton

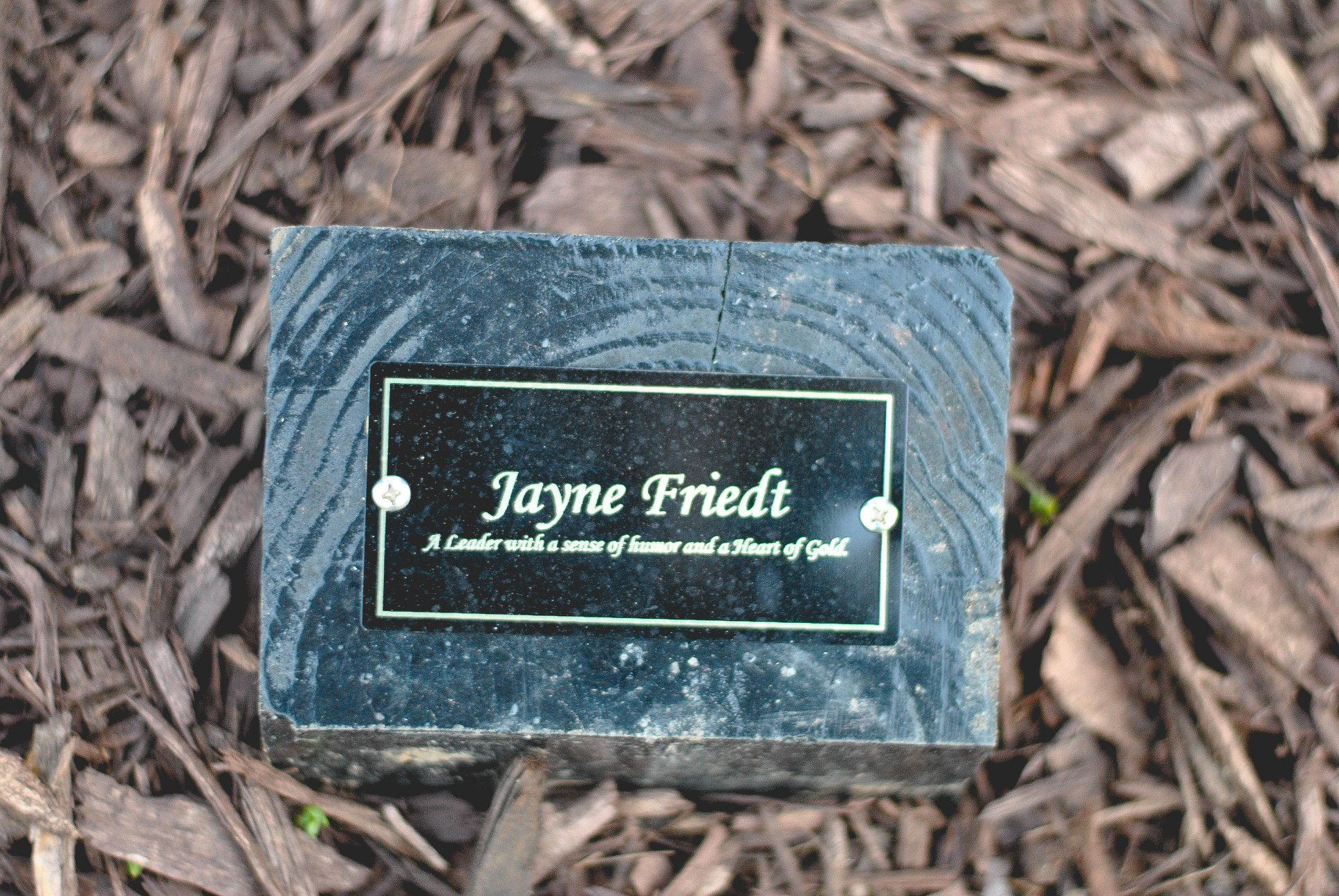
Plaque honoring Jayne Friedt

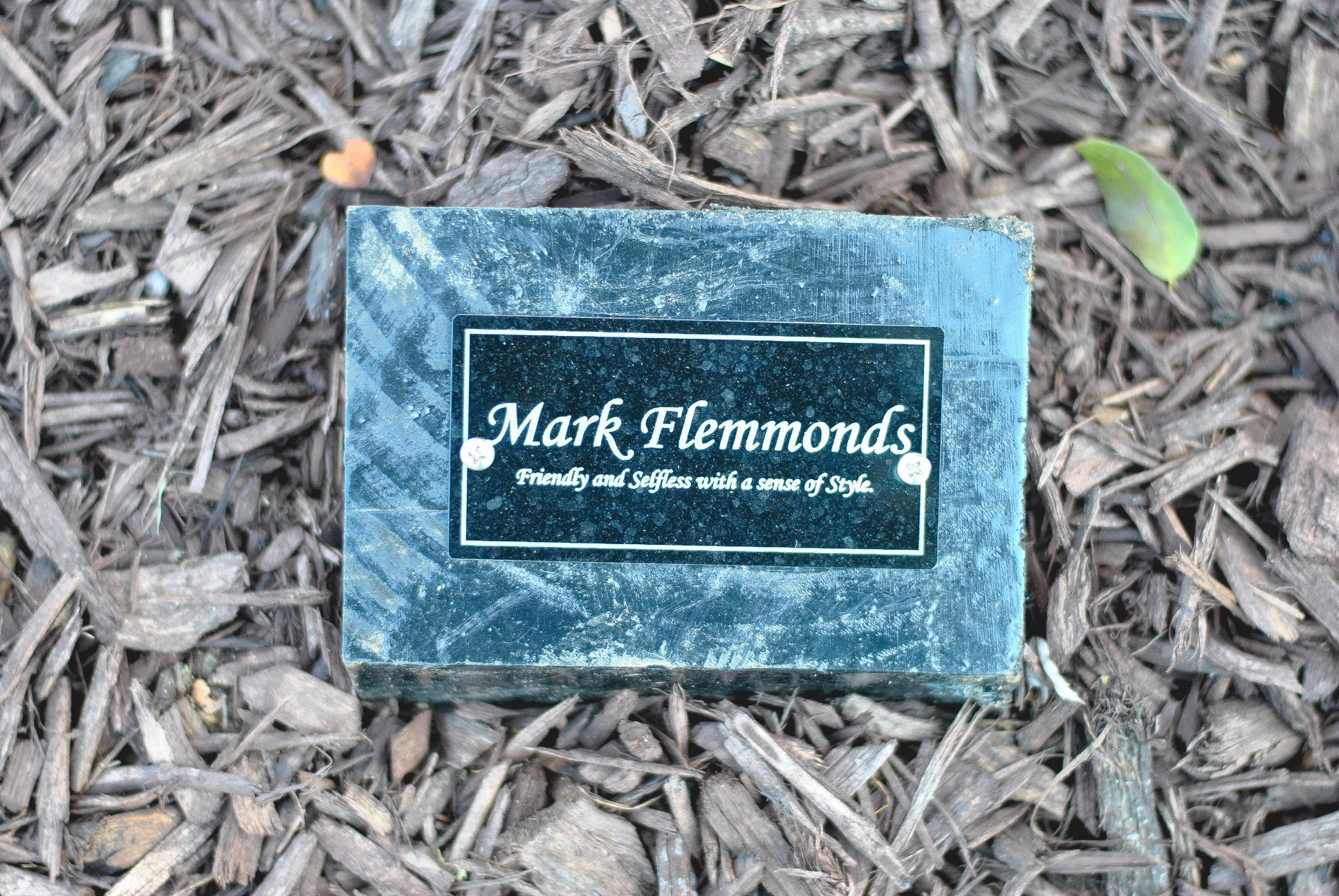
Plaque honoring Mark Flemmonds

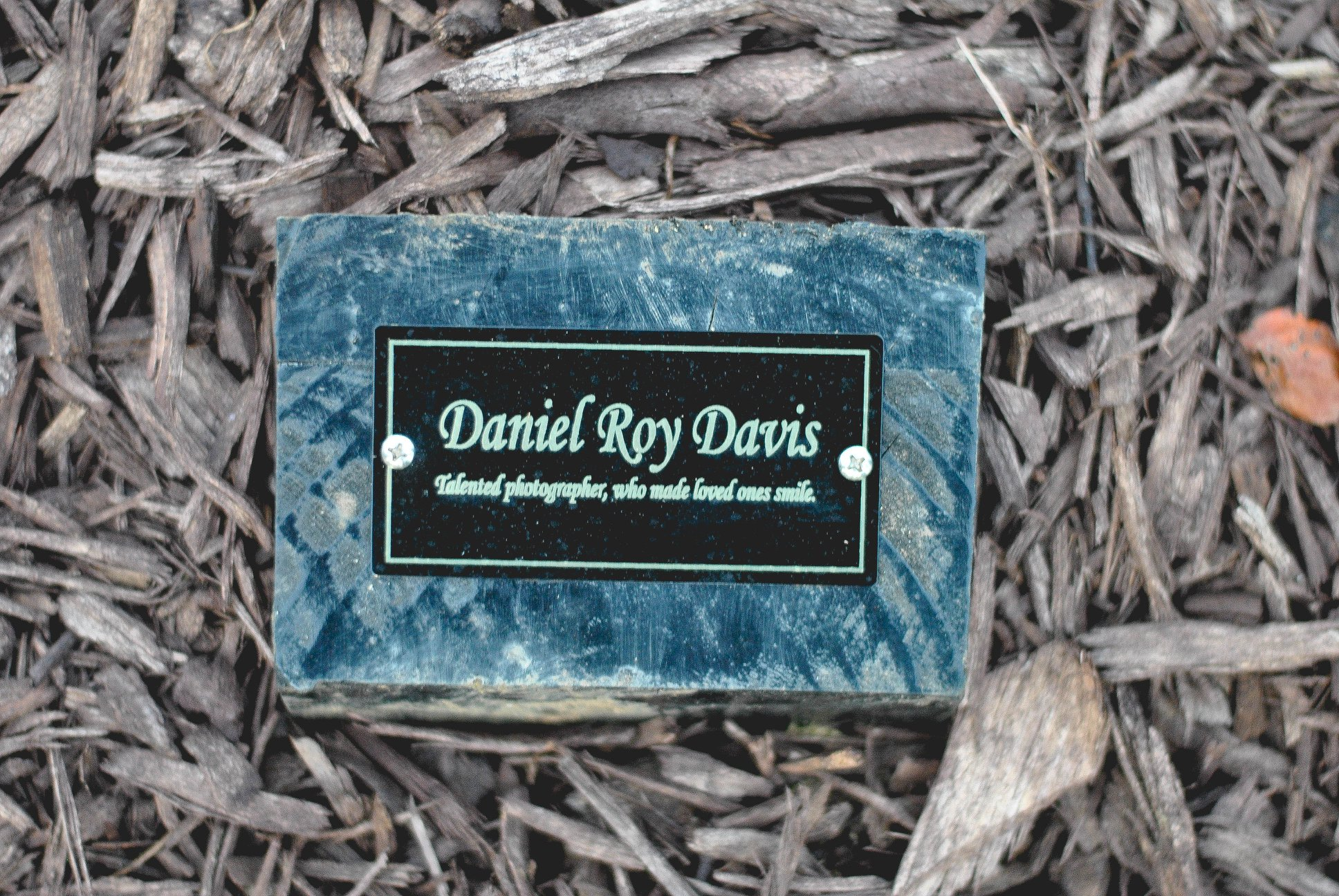
Plaque honoring Daniel Roy Davis

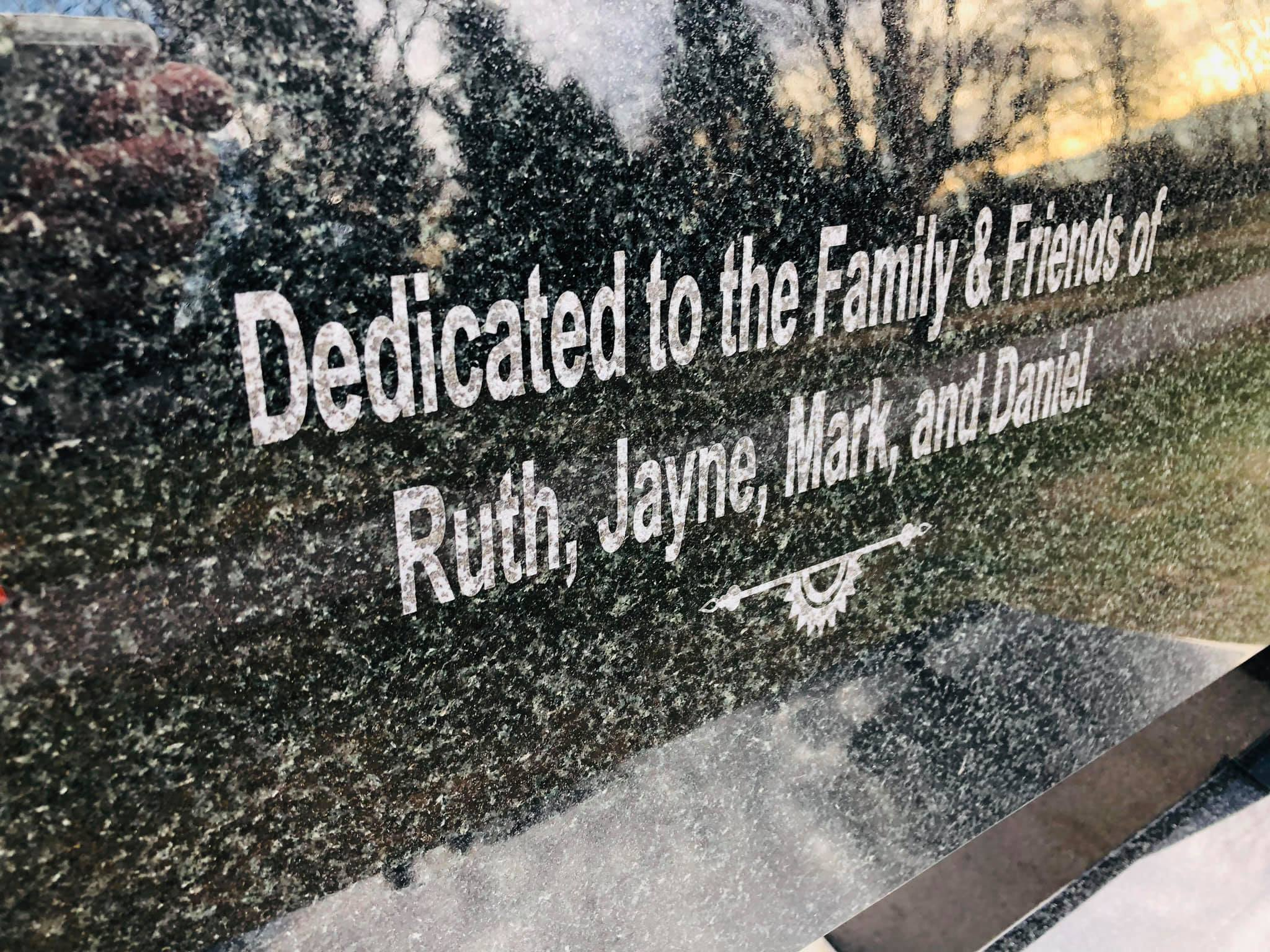
Inscription on memorial bench

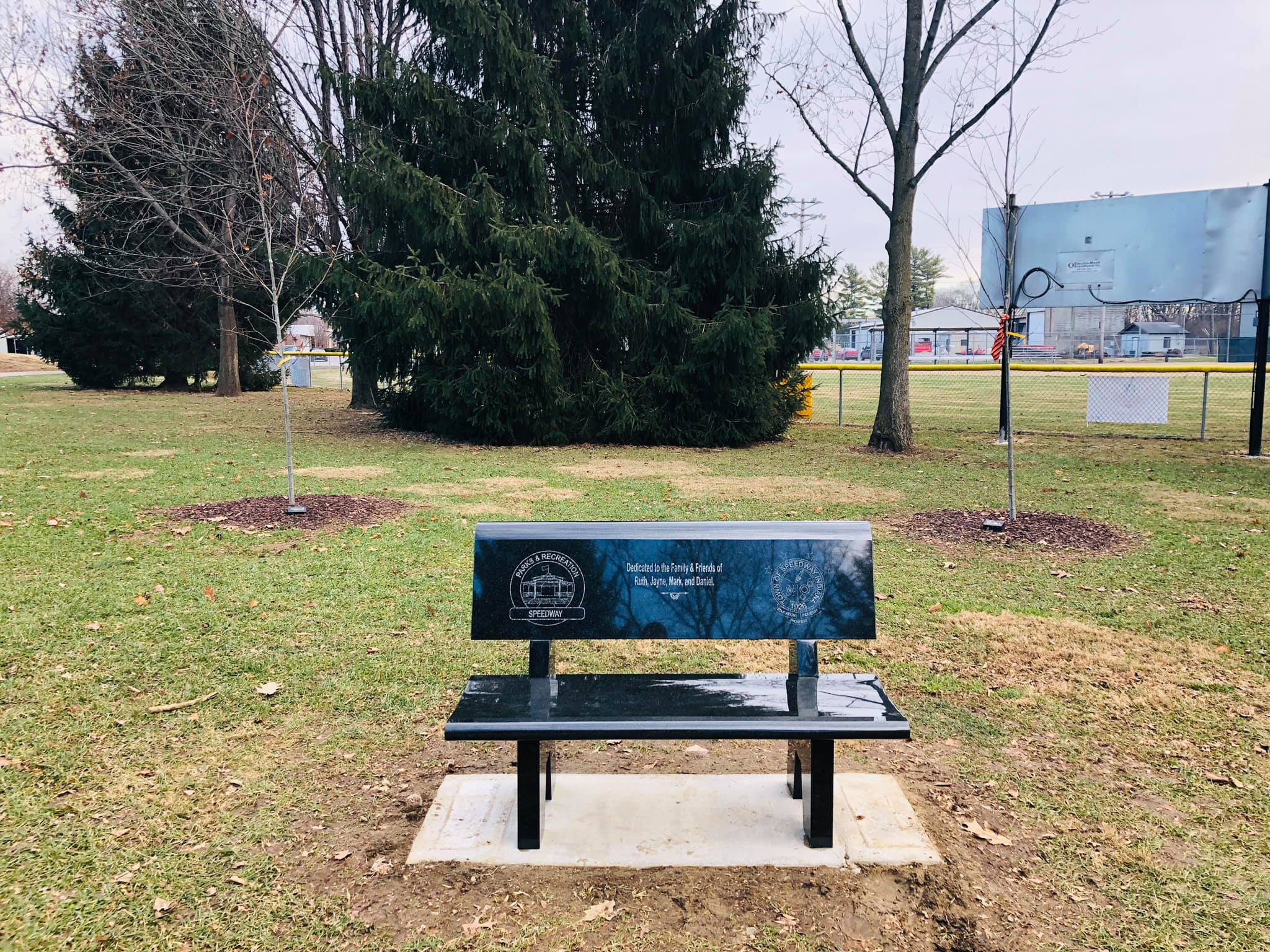
Memorial in December 2018

By January 2024, the former restaurant, last occupied by a CashLand pawn shop, was set to be demolished. The demolition took place the following March.

== Documentary ==
On September 5, 2022, Investigation Discovery aired Murders at the Burger Joint. The documentary digs deep into the still unsolved murders.

In October 2023, the crime documentary film The Speedway Murders premiered at the Adelaide Film Festival. On June 21, 2024, Vertical released the film to theaters.

== See also ==
- Kentucky Fried Chicken murders, 1983
- Brown's Chicken massacre, 1993
- McDonald's attack, multiple incidents
- 1991 Austin yogurt shop killings

General:

- Crime in Indiana
- List of unsolved deaths
