= Kimberlin =

Kimberlin is a surname of German origin. Notable people with the surname include:

- Charles Kimberlin Brain (1931–2023), eminent South African paleontologist
- Kimberlin Brown (born 1961), Emmy Award-nominated American actress
- Brett Kimberlin (born 1954) perpetrator of the Speedway Bombings
- Cynthia Tse Kimberlin, American ethnomusicologist
- Kevin Kimberlin, chairman of the venture capital firm, Spencer Trask & Co.
- Wade A. Kimberlin (born 1970), science-fiction author
