= Bertus Servaas =

Dutch-Polish entrepreneur

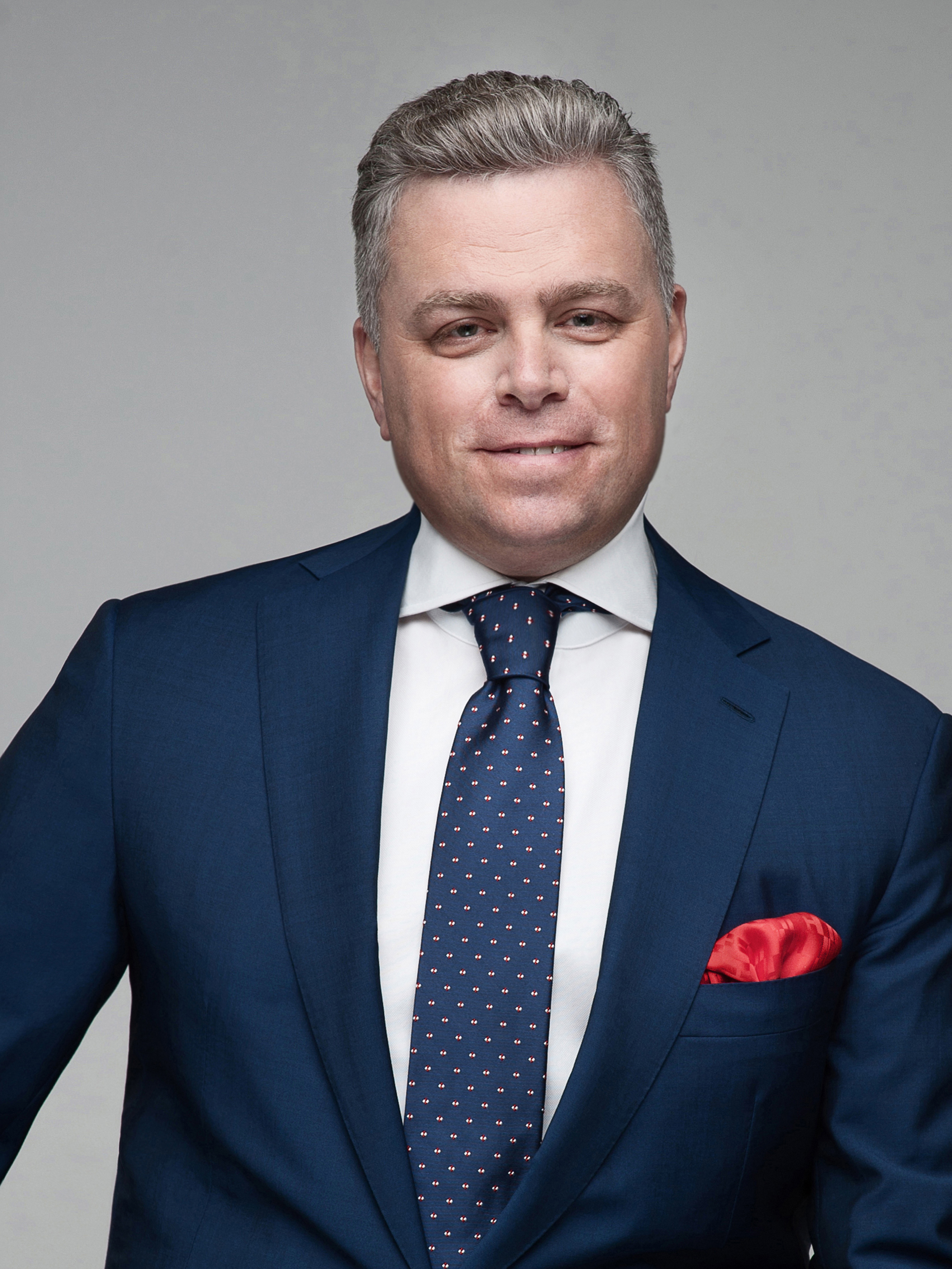
- Occupations: Chairman of VIVE Textile Recycling; President of Vive Kielce
- Awards: Order of Polonia Restituta

Bertus Jan-Willem Servaas is a Dutch–Polish entrepreneur, majority shareholder of the VIVE Group companies, and the president of the management board of Vive Textile Recycling, the largest company of the Polish textile recycling industry. He was the president of the Industria Kielce handball club between 2002 and 2023.

== Biography ==
Between 1976 and 1982 he played football for AFC Ajax Amsterdam, but a leg injury prevented him from continuing his career.

In 1991 he moved to Poland.

In 2002 he became the owner of Kolporter Kielce handball club (later renamed to Vive Kielce).

In 2003 he received the Kielce City Award from the Kielce City Mayor Wojciech Lubawski for promoting sport and acting for development of the city.

In 2012 he applied for Polish citizenship, and was granted one at the end of 2014.

In 2023 he resigned from his presidency of Vive Kielce.

== Awards and distinctions ==
- Knight's Cross of the Order of Polonia Restituta (2011), awarded by the President of the Republic of Poland Bronisław Komorowski (in recognition of his outstanding merits in the activities for people in need, and for particular achievements in organizational and social work)
- The Badge of Honor of the Świętokrzyskie Voivodeship (2016)
- The title of "Man of the Sport" in the “2002 Sport Stars of the Świętokrzyskie Region" contest (2003)
- The title of “Ambassador of Sport of the Świętokrzyskie Region" (2012) in the “Echo Dnia” contest
- The title of “Man of the Year 2016" (2017) in the “Echo Dnia” contest
- “Świętokrzyska Victoria” in “personality” category (2017)
