= Acapulco Gold =

Strain of cannabis

Acapulco Gold is a strain of Cannabis sativa that was popular during the 1960s counterculture movement for its potency, taste, and unique color. It is a landrace cannabis variety that is a 100% sativa Mexican strain. It is reported to be difficult to cultivate indoors under lights and is better grown as an outdoor plant due to its large size. This cannabis strain flushes in gold and amber tones in the final stages of flowering, producing dense golden buds with a peppery and citrus odor and flavor, and averages 24% THC and 1% CBD. The terpene profile of Acapulco Gold is mostly caryophyllene, a spicy terpene also found in black pepper. Myrcene is also present and contributes to the earthy aroma of the strain, as well as Limonene which adds a lemon aroma/flavour.

== History ==
First recorded in the United States in 1964, Acapulco Gold was defined by the Oxford English Dictionary the following year as "a special grade of cannabis growing in the vicinity of Acapulco...with a color of brownish gold, or a mixture of gold and green." Traditionally cultivated in the Guerrero Mountains outside the city, it is a landrace strain described as having "mind-blowing effects", which were attributed to a long growing season and the plant growing in conditions to which it was adapted. Smuggler and promoter Gary Tovar said that Acapulco Gold's distinctive color was the outcome of the way the plants were aged and dried by the wind off the Pacific Ocean. When cultivated outside its native range, it is considered to be substantially less potent than native plants: "while the original genetics of Acapulco Gold can be found among global seed companies, without that blazing Acapulco sun and Gulf breezes, the end product remains an artifice, a simulacrum of what could be had in 1974." As early as 1975, New York Magazine claimed that the strain's original potency had already been diluted due to overplanting in response to demand.

Called "connoisseur pot", in the 1960s Acapulco Gold was "a sought-after marijuana for American smokers, considered better quality than the weed growing in California or Texas." "Those in the know sought Mexican Acapulco Gold for the highest of highs." Another report highlighted its "exquisite taste". Its potency was due to a THC content of 23%, making it one of the strongest strains available at the time. The strain's association with quality was such that the 1993 textbook Drugs, Alcohol and Mental Health claimed that "Acapulco gold" had become a generic term for high-grade marijuana.

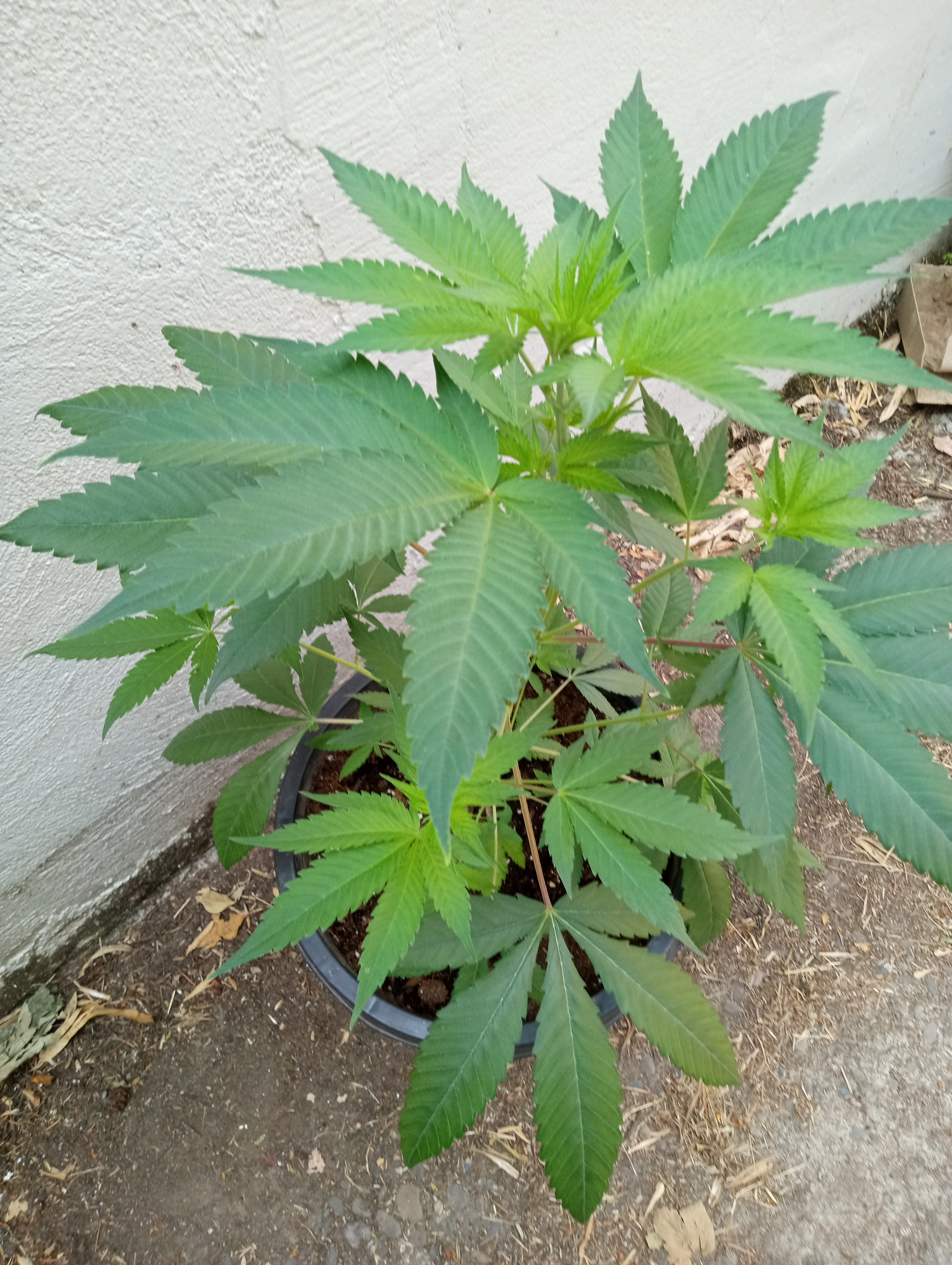
A young female Acapulco Gold plant (Mexican x Nepalese). Seed grown plant from seeds obtained from a cannabis seed bank.

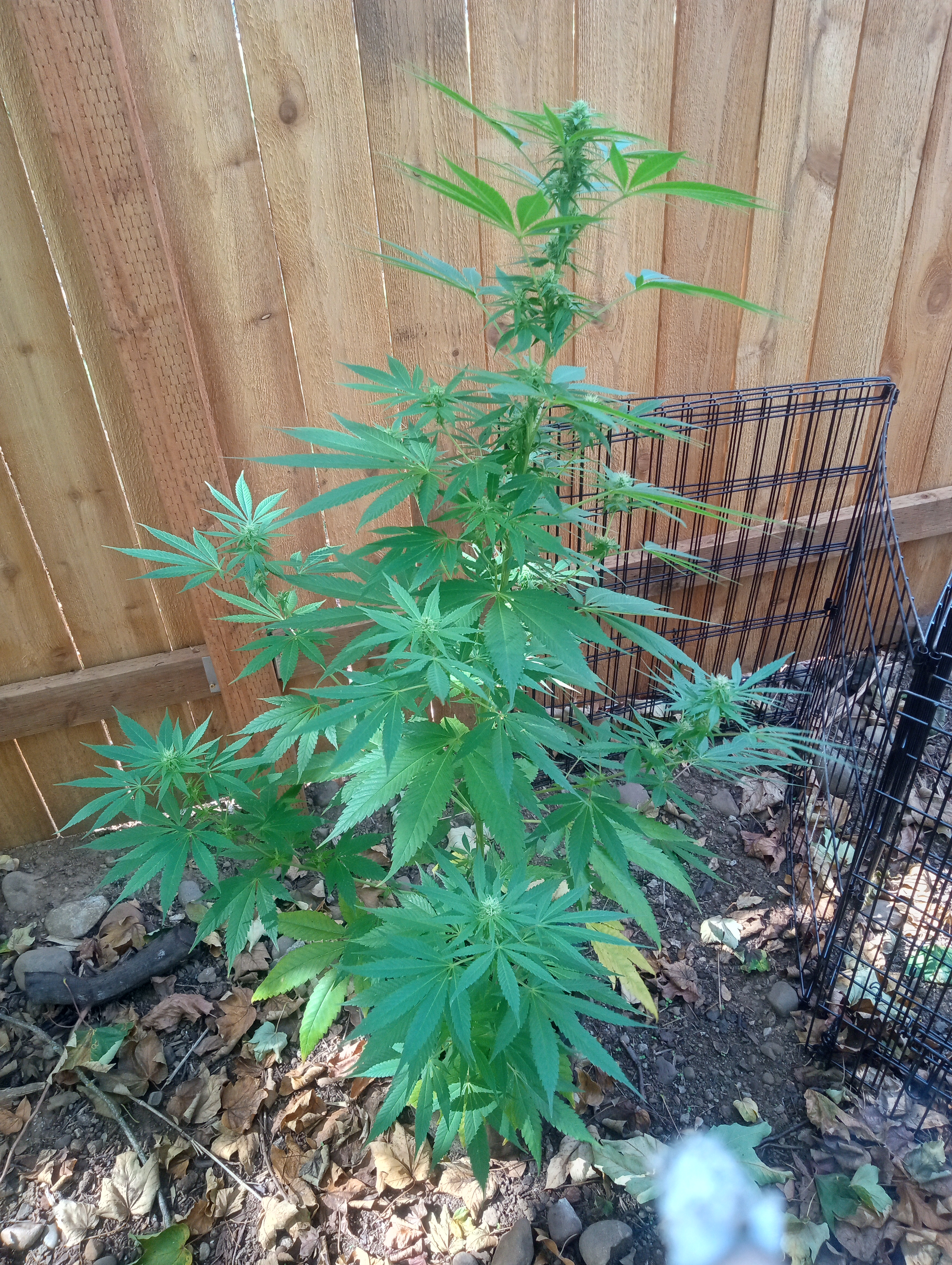
Acapulco Gold female plant in bloom

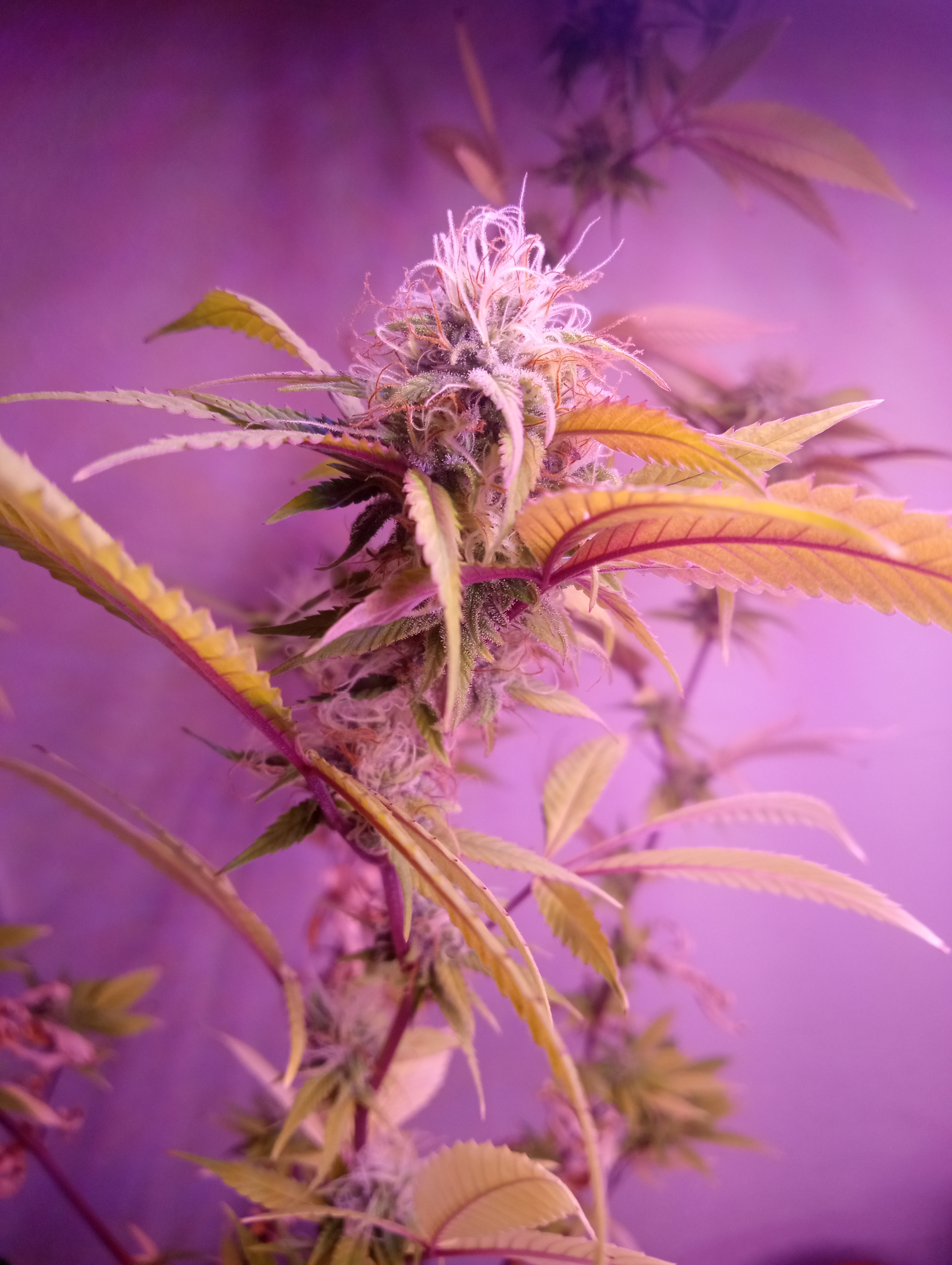
Indoor grown Acapulco Gold in final stages of flowering (flushing in amber and gold tones)

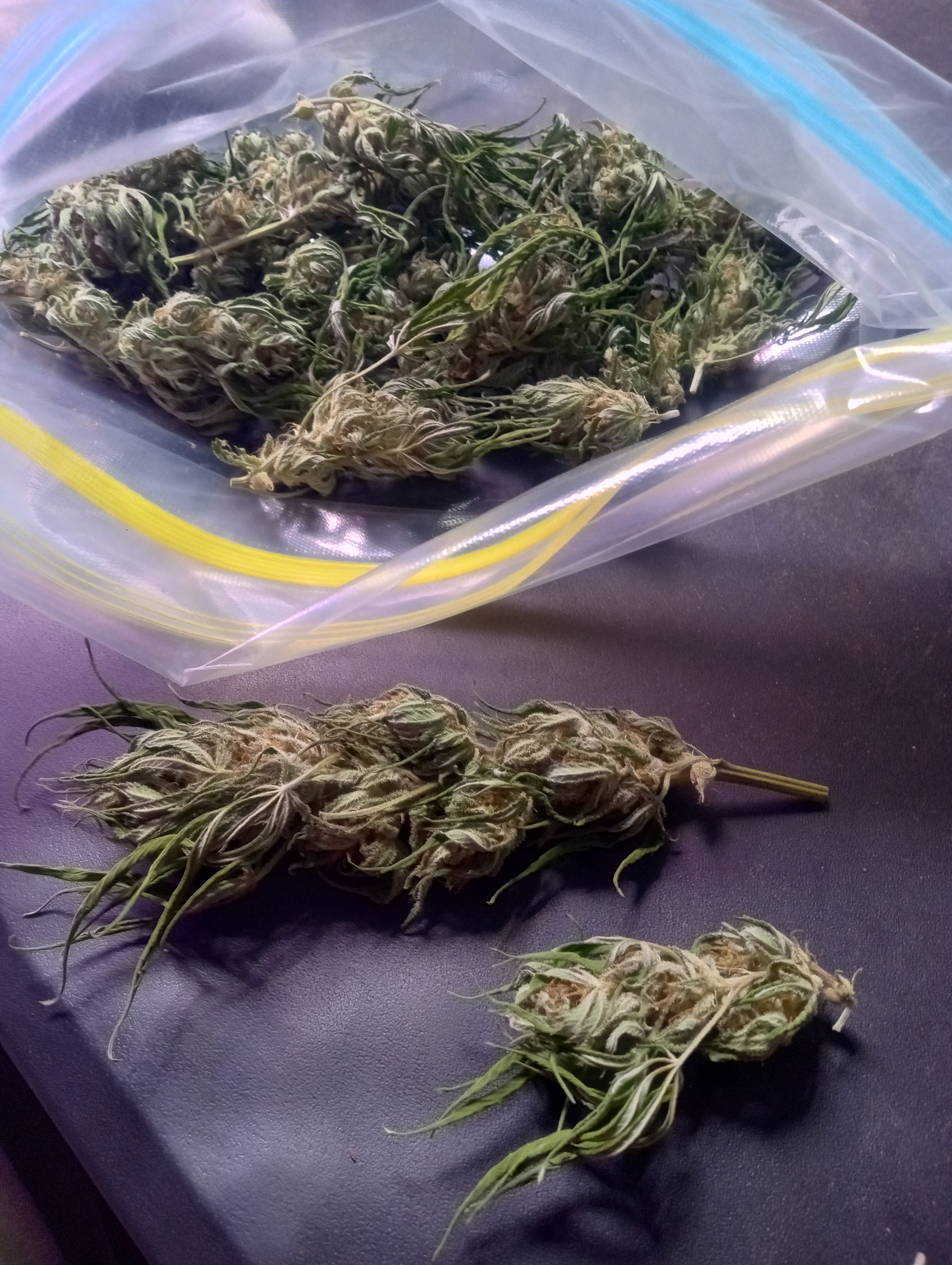
Freshly Harvested Acapulco Gold Female Flowers

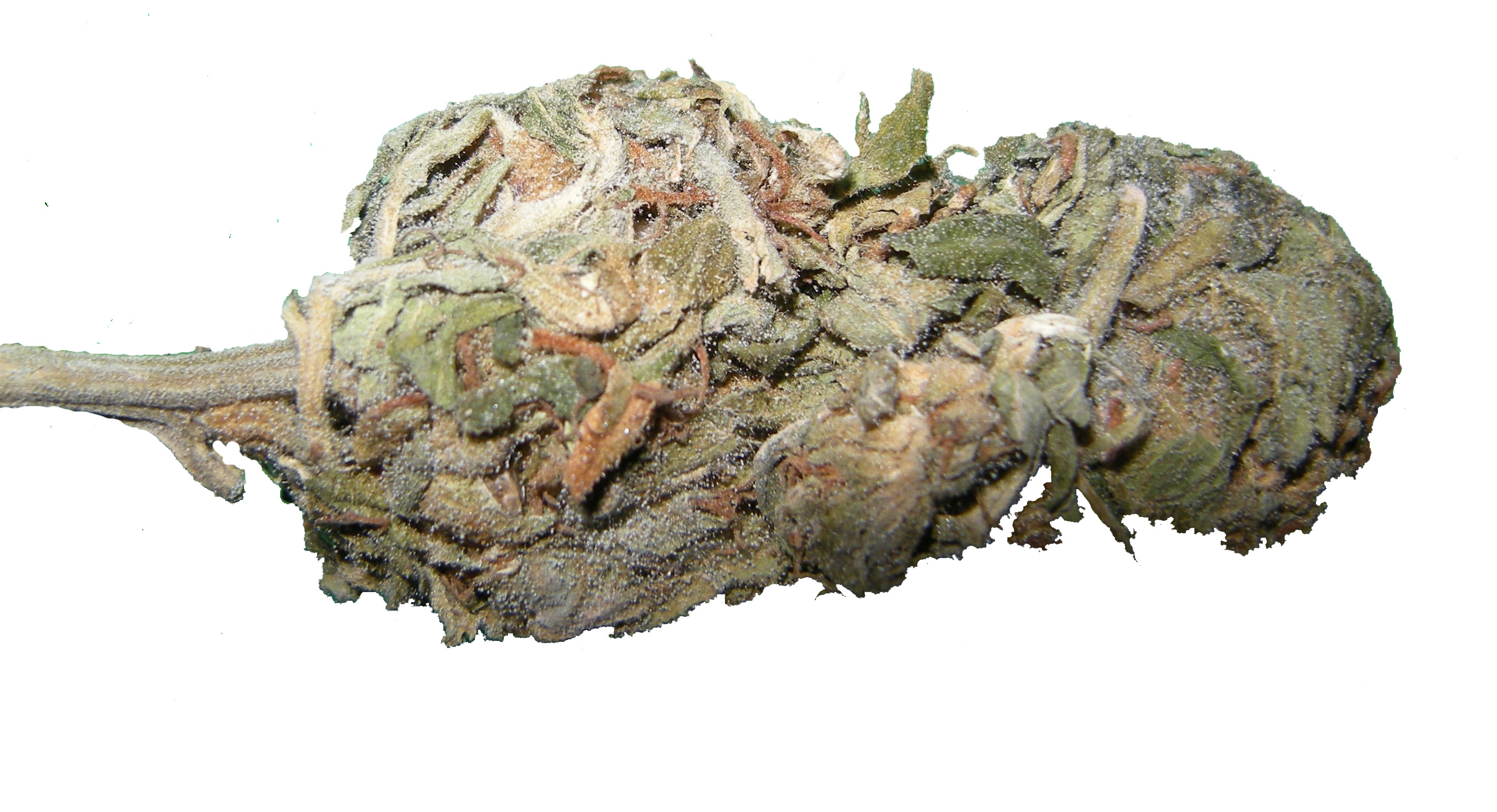
A modern bud of Acapulco Gold

Typical dispensary flower sample from Oregon, US

Acapulco Gold was a favorite strain of Carol Wayne, Paul Ferrara, and Jack Nicholson. Longtime NFL commissioner Pete Rozelle experimented with it around 1970, seeking to understand if marijuana would cause problems for his players. The rock duo Heth and Jed dealt Acapulco Gold as teenagers, and the drug dealer and Speedway bomber Brett Kimberlin claimed to have given some to future US Vice President Dan Quayle as a wedding present. Acapulco Gold was particularly in demand at Columbia University in the early 1970s, so much so that the university had a dedicated smuggling route via Austin, Texas.

Reported prices for Acapulco Gold were "the astronomical sum of twenty dollars an ounce" during the 1960s, $500 per kilo in 1967, and $30 an ounce in 1972, or adjusted for inflation, equal to around $150 an ounce in 2022 USD. Acapulco Gold was possibly $36 per kilo at the source in Mexico in 1973. For comparison, the legal price in Port Angeles, Washington was $12 per gram in November 2016.

It was incorrectly claimed as early as 1968 that the name 'Acapulco Gold' had been trademarked in anticipation of marijuana legalization; in August 1969, Harlan Ellison asserted that the trademark had been registered to tobacco company Liggett & Myers. In 1971, the term was used as a brand name for rolling papers intended to be sold to raise funds to campaign for marijuana legalization; Amorphia, the organization that backed the effort, eventually merged with NORML. The rolling papers reportedly generated most of the funding to support the 1972 California marijuana initiative Proposition 19. When the US Patent and Trademark Office briefly opened trade name registration for medical marijuana strains in 2010, Acapulco Gold was one of the trademarks submitted before the category was abandoned.

During the late 1970s, as much as 20 percent of the Mexican marijuana being imported into the US was contaminated with the herbicide paraquat, which caused the plants to turn golden. This increased demand for the contaminated marijuana by causing it to be mistaken for higher-quality Acapulco Gold. The contamination was the result of a drug eradication program being carried on by the Mexican government to which the United States contributed $13 million annually. The Mexican Army had previously burned many of the original Acapulco Gold fields in 1967 at the urging of the US government.

Acapulco Gold was one of the parents of the hybrid Skunk No. 1, which was called "the backbone of the modern cannabis breeding world." In 2014, High Times magazine named Acapulco Gold one of the greatest strains of all time.

Acapulco Gold has lent its name to both a California politician and an Irish racehorse.

== Literary significance ==
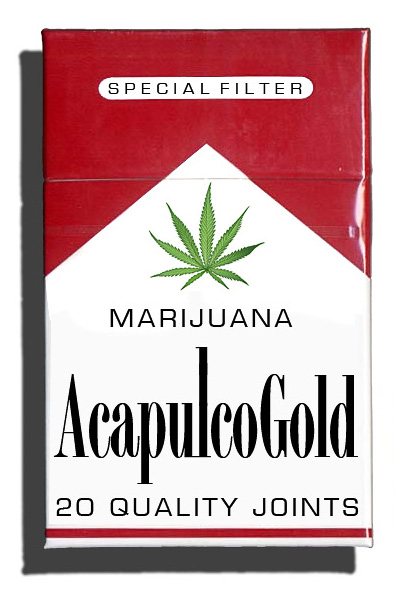
A mockup of a pack of Acapulco Gold cigarettes

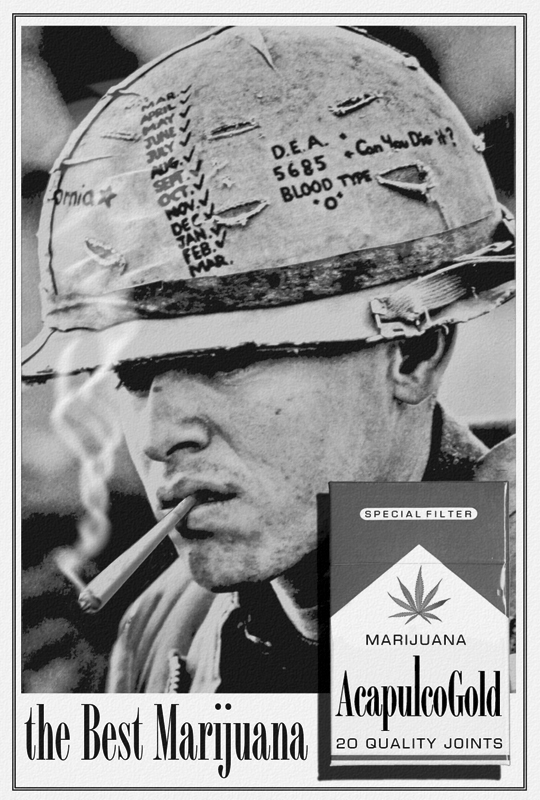
A satirical advertisement for Acapulco Golds

Given its status as an icon of the counterculture movement, Acapulco Gold appeared prominently in American literature during its heyday. The 1972 novel Acapulco Gold by Edwin Corley posited that marijuana would be legalized in the near future and depicted the competition among advertising agencies to secure the first marketing account for marijuana cigarettes. The protagonists in Roberto Bolaño's novel The Savage Detectives were undiscovered writers who began trafficking in Acapulco Gold in order to fund a literary magazine, and Acapulco Gold cigarettes are described as a top brand in David Gerrold's Nebula Award-winning fix-up When HARLIE Was One.

The strain received tribute in Norman Spinrad's 1969 novel Bug Jack Barron. Spinrad's work described a futuristic United States where marijuana usage was not only legal but commonplace, with its users including senior elected officials and major celebrities, and where the leading brand was Acapulco Golds, which were promoted on national television with Juan Valdez-style advertising:

Mexican peon leading burro up winding trail on jungle-covered volcanic mountain, a fruity-authoritative Encyclopædia Britannica voice over: "In the high country of Mexico evolved a savoury strain of marijuana which came to be known as Acapulco Gold in the days of the contraband trade." Cut to same peon cutting a stand of marijuana with a sickle and loading it onto burro: "Prized for its superior flavour and properties, Acapulco Gold was available only to the favoured few due to its rarity and..." Roll to border patrolman frisking unsavoury Pancho Villa type Mexican: "the difficulties involved in importation." Aerial view of huge field of geometrically-rowed marijuana: "But now the finest strain of Mexican seeds, combined with American agricultural skill and carefully controlled growing conditions, produce a pure strain of marijuana unequalled in flavour, mildness...and relaxing properties. Now available in thirty-seven states: (Cut to close-up of red and gold Acapulco Golds pack.) Acapulco Golds, America's premium quality marijuana cigarette—and, of course, totally noncarcinogenic.

The use of Acapulco Gold is common in L. Ron Hubbard's Mission Earth novels, including Voyage of Vengeance, An Alien Affair, and Death Quest. Acapulco Gold also appears in works by Oscar Zeta Acosta, Hunter S. Thompson, Darryl Pinckney, Jonathan Raban, Guillermo Cabrera Infante, David Foster Wallace, and Carol Berge.

Linguist Jean-Charles Seigneuret attributed the strain's literary popularity to its role as a "psychedelic Philosopher's Stone" which served "to transform the metaphorical lead of the harried, detribalized modern conscience into the 'gold' latent in 'Acapulco gold.'"

== In film and music ==
The strain gave its name to a 1976 smuggling film which starred former evangelist Marjoe Gortner, Robert Lansing, and Ed Nelson, and was directed by Burt Brinckerhoff. Acapulco Gold was also the title of a 1973 mockumentary by Bob Grosvenor about the history of marijuana cultivation and the efforts of a group of college students to smuggle Mexico's "super weed" into the United States. Mick Jagger's character in the 1970 film Performance was depicted as a user of Acapulco Gold.

Acapulco Gold's best-known appearance in film was in 1978's Up in Smoke, starring the comedy duo Cheech & Chong. "I can smoke anything, man," Cheech Marin's character Pedro bragged. "You know like I smoke that Michoacán, and Acapulco Gold, man." The duo's debut album seven years before had featured a track titled "Acapulco Gold Filters", which included the lyrics, "No stems no seeds that you don't need, Acapulco Gold is some badass weed."

During the first season of Saturday Night Live, host Desi Arnaz thanked the crew of the show for presenting him with a box of "Acapulco Gold cigars."

Psychedelic pop group The Rainy Daze released a 1967 album titled That Acapulco Gold, portraying Mexico as a far-off land where "the streets are lined with bricks of that Acapulco Gold". The title track reached #70 on the Billboard Hot 100 before being pulled from circulation for promoting marijuana use. Vice President Spiro Agnew later denounced the song as "blatant drug-culture propaganda...threatening to destroy our national strength".

The New Riders of the Purple Sage included a song called "Henry" on their 1971 debut album, which described an attempt to smuggle 20 kilos of Acapulco Gold out of Mexico. Led Zeppelin paid tribute to the strain in the live versions of the 1973 song "Over the Hills and Far Away". Johnathan Rice's 2013 album Good Graces included a track titled "Acapulco Gold".

Guitar pedal manufacturer EarthQuaker Devices released a distortion pedal under the name.

== See also ==
- Cannabis strains
- Medical cannabis
