= Velvet Revolution (disambiguation) =

The Velvet Revolution was a non-violent revolution in 1989 in Czechoslovakia.

Velvet Revolution may also refer to:

- 2018 Armenian revolution
- "Velvet Revolution" (song), a song from Tori Amos' 2007 album American Doll Posse
- Velvet Revolution (organization), an activist organization founded by Brett Kimberlin
