= FQI =

FQI may refer to:

- Fuel quantity indicator, contributing factor to Tuninter Flight 1153 crash
- Floristic Quality Index, statistic used in Floristic Quality Assessment
- Fiber Quality Index, used to measure the quality of cotton fiber for cotton recycling
