= Cotton recycling =

Reuse of cotton fabric

The cotton recycling symbol.

Cotton recycling is the process of converting cotton fabric into fibers that can be reused into other textile products.

Recycled cotton is primarily made from pre-consumer cotton which is excess textile waste from clothing production. It is less commonly made from post-consumer cotton which is discarded textile waste from consumers such as second hand clothing. The recycling process includes assessing the quality of cotton fibers through systematic collection, manually sorting the materials, and undergoing a mechanical or chemical process to break down the textile fabric into reusable fibers. In the mechanical process, fabrics are torn into individual fibers through a machine, and in the chemical process, the fabric's chemical properties are broken down through chemical reaction processes such as Lyocell process and dissolution in ionic liquids. The mechanical process is the primary way to recycle textiles because the chemical process is not commercially used.

Recycled cotton is less durable than virgin cotton due to the shorter length of recycled cotton fibers which result from mechanical recycling. As a result, recycled cotton requires the addition of additional materials such as polyester to improve durability. Therefore, recycled cotton is often used in products that do not require high-quality cotton fibers such as casual clothing and home building materials.

Harvesting raw cotton is a resource intensive process that uses a lot of water, energy, and chemicals. Cotton recycling mitigates wastage and can be a more sustainable alternative to disposal because products can be made out of existing textiles instead of raw materials, therefore, reducing the resources required to harvest raw cotton. However, there are costs associated with cotton recycling, such as the risk of problem shifting and the impact of transporting collected materials which could exceed its intended benefits. Researchers and governments are looking for new technologies and industrial management solutions to improve the social impact of the collection processes for recycled cotton.

== Raw material ==
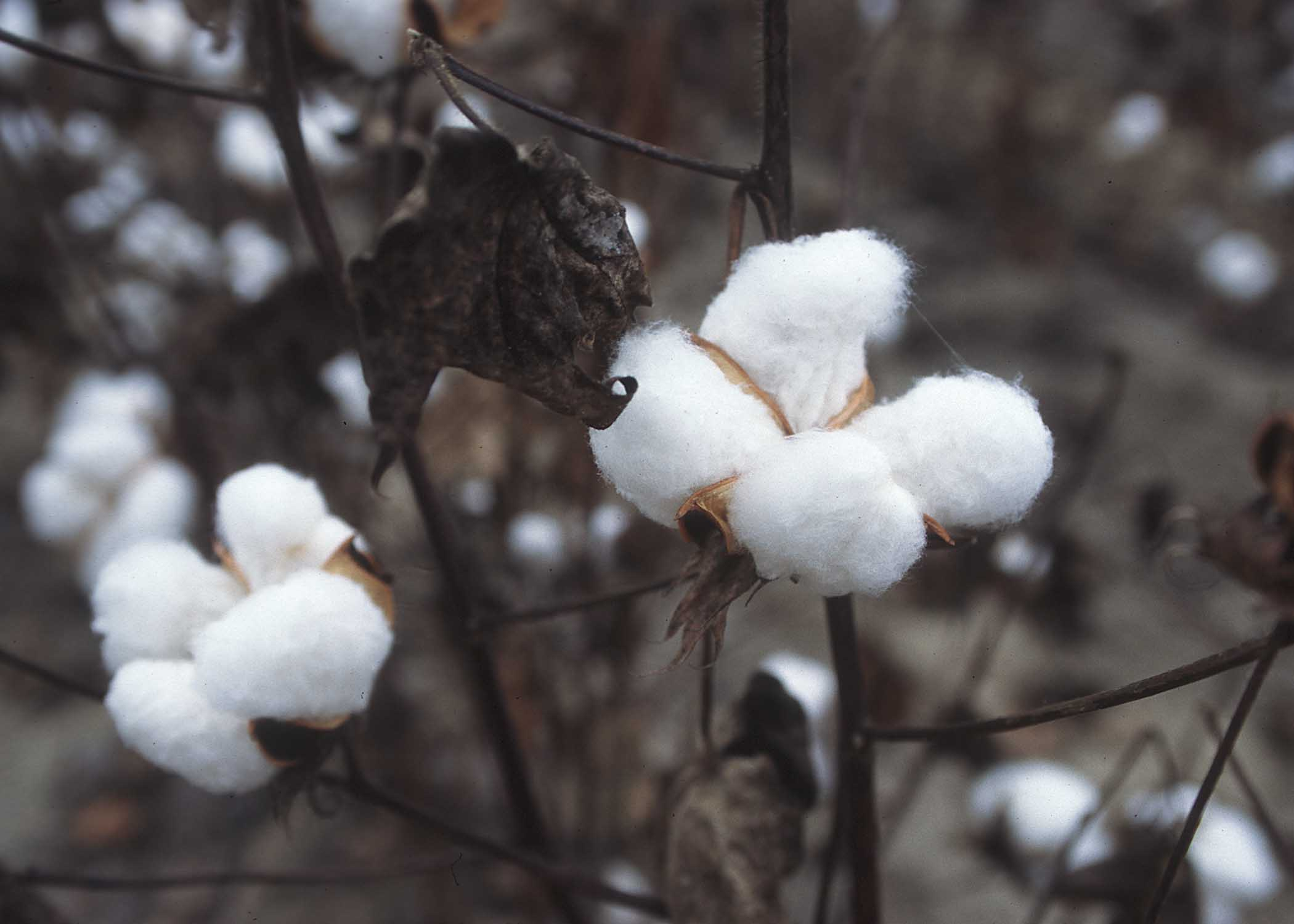
Cotton bolls on the cotton plant ready for harvesting and processing into cotton yarn and fabric.

=== Composition of starting material ===
==== Pre-Consumer cotton ====
Pre-consumer cotton waste is excess textile waste that is collected during the production of yarn, fabrics, and textile products such as selvage from weaving and fabric remnants from factory cutting rooms. The majority of recycled cotton is made from pre-consumer cotton, such as fabric scraps, because it is more likely that the scraps have not undergone the mixing of materials and color dyes and do not have to be heavily sorted before recycling.

==== Post-Consumer cotton ====
Post-consumer cotton is textile waste that is collected after consumers have discarded the finished products, such as used apparel and household items. Post-consumer cotton which is made with many color shades and fabric blends is labor-intensive to recycle because the different materials have to be separated before recycling. Post-consumer cotton can be recycled, but the recycled cotton made from post-consumer cotton is likely of much lower quality than virgin cotton.

=== Collection of materials ===
Methods for collecting recycled materials can be categorized into the following initiatives: internet-based recycling, brand-led recycling, and government-led recycling. Internet-based recycling relies on the internet to create a channel of communication between people who would like to recycle clothing waste and groups who are collecting clothing waste. Brand-led recycling occurs when fashion brands create self-led programs to support recycling or oversee clothing recycling. Government-led recycling refers to policies, laws, and regulations implemented by governments that promote the recycling of waste-clothes.

=== Sorting of materials ===
After pre-consumer and post-consumer textile products are collected, the textile products are manually sorted into reusable and disposal groups. The sorting process is labor-intensive because there can be up to 350 subcategories that reusable textiles can be manually sorted into.

One approach to combat the low efficiency of manual sorting is near infrared spectroscopy (NIRS) which automates the recognition and sorting process of textiles. NIRS analyzer identifies the corresponding group for textile by sensing the coating and finishing of the textile.

=== Quality assessment ===
In order for cotton waste to be recycled into high-quality products, the quality of the cotton waste should not jeopardize the quality of the resulting product. While there is no specific index for the quality assessment of recycled cotton, a variety of quality indexes have been applied to determine how suitable cotton waste fibers are for recycling.

Common indexes to measure the quality of cotton fiber are Fiber Quality Index (FQI) and Spinning Consistency Index (SCI). FQI relates the tenacity, mean length, and fineness of cotton fibers while SCI considers properties such as the upper half mean length, uniformity, and fiber color to determine the spinnability of cotton. A standardized instrument to obtain data regarding the various properties of cotton waste is the Uster HVI machine.

== Process ==
=== Mechanical recycling ===
Mechanical recycling is the process of shredding textile fabric into fibers, which are then spun back into yarn without the use of chemicals. When cotton is mechanically recycled, it usually produces a shorter fiber length, which can affect the quality of the end textile. Often, recycled cotton is blended with carrier fibers, like virgin or organic cotton, or polyester, to create a higher-quality output. Typically, a recycled fiber content of 20% is used when producing recycled ring yarn, even though some recent advancements in the sector have allowed that number to go up to 40% without compromising quality, as announced by the partnership of Recover, Rieter and Polopiqué.

Prior to recycling, the textile fabrics must be sorted by composition, and then by color to avoid redyeing. The mechanical process of producing post-consumer recycled cotton begins by removing all non-textile elements, such as zippers and buttons. Then, the materials are cut into smaller pieces, suitable for subsequent shredding. A Garnett machine is used for this process, which is a machine equipped with rollers and cylinders covered with metal pins that rotate to open up the textile structure and release the fibers. Certain types of bio-composite materials could be made of post-consumer cotton waste. Shredded cotton fibers from post-consumer textile waste are used as reinforcement fillers for various plastics in automotive and nuclear applications and for various commercial applications.

=== Chemical recycling ===
Chemical recycling is the process of solubilizing textile wastes in chemicals to cause chemical reactions that produce recycled fibers. Chemical reactions dissolve the polymers that make up fibers, therefore do not reduce fiber length but instead fully regenerate the fiber. This process overcomes the issue of fibers being shortened by mechanical recycling, but its scale of use is limited to research experiments and studies such as Eco Circle (Teijin), Worn Again, Evrnu, Re:NewCell, and Ioncell. An outdated method mixes cellulose fiber (cotton) with carbon disulfide, dissolves the product in caustic soda, and spins it with sulfuric acid and mineral salt to produce a fiber different from cotton called viscose rayon. This method has been shown to be environmentally hazardous and is prohibited. One of the most commercialized examples of chemical textile recycling is the conversion of cotton to viscose : one depolymerises the cotton into a pulp and converts that pulp into viscose (in a similar process as with wood pulp).

==== Lyocell process ====
The lyocell process is the method of dissolving cellulose (cotton) in N-methylmorpholine N-oxide (NMMO) to form a solution that has hydrogen bonds (NMMO•H_{2}O). The solution is then spun in a water bath, resulting in pure, reusable cellulosic fibers. The lyocell process could recover 99% of its solvent and produces minimal and non-toxic waste, and is labeled by the United Nations and the cotton recycling industry as Environmentally Improved Textile Products (EITP).

==== Dissolving in ionic liquids ====
Another method dissolves cellulose in ionic liquids such as 1,3,-dibutylimidazolium chloride ([C4mim]Cl) to produce regenerated fibers. While this method, like the lyocell process, could recover almost all of its solvent, its hazardous impacts to the aqueous ecology is still being researched.

== Potential impacts ==
=== Assessment standard ===
The environmental impact of cotton recycling can be examined using the Life Cycle Impact Assessment (LCIA).

=== Recycled vs. organic cotton fibers ===
The production of organic cotton can have detrimental environmental impacts due to the amount of water, land, chemicals, and emissions used to create it. Approximately 2.6% of global water use can be attributed to the production of cotton. Cotton cultivation is also responsible for about 11% of global pesticide consumption. During the spinning phase of virgin cotton production, large amounts of electricity are consumed which can lead to increased CO_{2} emissions and acidification potential. In order to give organic cotton an artificial color, the dyeing phase of cotton production consumes a vast amount of water, energy, and chemicals. The plants required to dye cotton can potentially lead to the contamination of oceans.

Since cotton recycling avoids cotton cultivation, spinning, and dyeing, it reduces the negative environmental impacts of producing organic cotton by minimizing the use of water, fertilizers, and pesticides. For example, using 1000 kg of recycled cotton instead of organic cotton can save 0.5 ha of agricultural land, prevent 6600 kg CO_{2} eq of emissions from entering the atmosphere, and conserve 2783 m^{3} of irrigation water.

== Limitations ==
=== Technical difficulties ===
Modern textiles often include materials other than cotton such as plastic, dye, and other fabrics which can make it difficult to separate the cotton for recycling.

=== Social difficulties ===
Currently, the most common collection methods are organized based on online platforms provided by brands, and government. Though these methods are available, many consumers still choose to throw away their clothes and less than 10% of the population considers online clothing recycling platforms as part of their buying preferences. Significant research has been done to increase the popularity of online clothing recycling.

=== Brand-led recycling ===
Fashion brands offer programs to recycle clothes after consumption or oversee the recycling process. Consumers can drop off their old clothing at the store and the store will send these clothes to be recycled. The company offers incentives through promotions or discounts to persuade consumers to recycle through the firm's website, social media, and in-store advertising. A US clothing brand called American Eagle promoted their recycling program on their blog on April 1, 2019, by stating "Bring in your old pair of jeans to recycle and get $10 off, a new pair".

Based on the case studies of clothing brands, the recycling advertisement could be paradoxical since promoting customers to recycle actually encourages them to consume more, thus not helping to reduce pollution. Research on the clothing product and global warming relationship shows that adopting sustainable recycle habits does not make the production of new cloth to be eco-friendly because producing new fabric generates more than half of the total carbon dioxide emission related to garments. To resolve the dilemma, brand-led recycling is trying to find a balance between consumer incentives and educational purposes of sustainability.

== Future policies and laws ==
Effective cotton recycling is likely only possible through government policy making and multiple countries have set up policies to promote cotton recycling. In 2023, the European Union plans to publish a revision of the Waste Framework Directive, which is hoped will provide clearer guidance to improve the current fabric recycling system by implementing commonly shared standards in material collections and classification. Also, non-EU countries including Britain, Japan, the United States, China, and Korea have also released laws and policies about wasted cotton material and the corresponding recycling guidance.

== See also ==
- Cotton paper
- Textile recycling
