= Acapulco Gold (clothing brand) =

American clothing brand

Acapulco Gold (Clothing)
- Founded: 2006
- Headquarters: New York City, New York, United States
- Products: Clothing, Skateboard Decks, Accessories

Acapulco Gold is a clothing brand founded in New York City in 2006.

Co-owners Augie Galan and Geoff Heath met while working at Supreme (clothing) in 1998. After nearly a decade there, they decided to branch off and start their own line of clothing. The brand began with T-shirts and hats at first, then as popularity grew extended their line to include high quality cut and sew garments.

Acapulco Gold sells its clothing at boutiques in 19 countries and has a global reach through its website.

Acapulco Gold has collaborated with photographer Janette Beckman to produce an ongoing line of T-shirts and hats based on her photographs.

In 2010, Acapulco Gold teamed with Mark McNairy to create original footwear.

Acapulco Gold also collaborated with Vans in 2010 to put their twist on the Moda Hi sneaker.
