= Recover Textile Systems =

Spanish textile company

Recover Textile Systems, S.L.
- Trade name: Recover
- Type: Privately held company
- Industry: Textiles
- Founded: 2020
- Headquarters: Banyeres de Mariola, Spain
- Products: Recycled Cotton Fiber
- Website: recoverfiber.com

Recover Textile Systems, mainly known as Recover, is a materials science company and producer of mechanically recycled cotton fiber and recycled cotton fiber blends, created in 2020 with its headquarters in Banyeres de Mariola, Spain.

== History ==
Recover is a spin-off of Ferre Yarns (Hilaturas Ferre), a Spanish textile company based in Banyeres de Mariola, Spain. The Ferre family started its business in 1914 as a textile factory dedicated to the production of jute and other non-clothing textiles. After a period of raw material shortages due to the first and second world wars, in 1947 the company started recycling textile waste back into cotton yarns.

In 2006, Ferre Yarns gave a name to its recycled product line: Recover. In the following years, the company started expanding its product lines by including cotton fiber blends in its portfolio, such as recycled cotton-recycled polyester (rPET) and recycled cotton-organic cotton. In 2014, Ferre Yarns launched its first Recover product lines with retailers such as H&M, Armani, Hugo Boss and Inditex.

In December 2020, Ferre Yarns announced it sold its spin-off Recover to the American private equity fund STORY3 Capital. Ferre Yarns would focus on spinning, while the fiber business would be taken over by the newly created Recover Textile Systems, S.L. The Ferre family announced it would maintain a minority stake in Recover as Alfredo Ferre was named chief executive officer.

In May 2021, Recover announced it opened a facility in Pakistan in partnership with Artistic Denim Mills (ADM). In May 2022, Recover unveiled its new facility in Dhaka, Bangladesh to boost its manufacturing capabilities and directly service the country's textile sector. Bangladesh is the world's second largest apparel exporter after China, and was deemed, therefore, an ideal location for expansion given the increasing demand for ‘sustainable’ materials.

In June 2022, Goldman Sachs Group Inc.’s asset-management arm led a $100 million growth investment in the company. The investment, the company said, put it on track to increase its production and add 15 manufacturing facilities in seven geographies, including Vietnam.

== Manufacturing process ==
The company's manufacturing process falls under mechanical textile-to-textile recycling, a process which recovers materials of pre-consumer, post-consumer and post-industrial origins to transform them into recycled yarns for new fabrics. Textile recycling is a component of a circular economy, along with reusing, reducing and repairing.

Recover has a public Life Cycle Assessment (LCA) study published in 2016, that was carried out by the University of Valencia, called "Environmental impact of Recover cotton in the Textile industry". The study was later verified by AITEX and UNESCO. It analyzes the manufacturing process of a garment made from conventional cotton compared to one made from Recover recycled cotton. The use of recycled cotton eliminates several phases of the manufacturing process of conventional cotton, such as farming, ginning, and dyeing. This produces savings for the environment in terms of water, pollutants, CO_{2} emissions, energy and land use.

Recover complies to annual verification tests and certifications by third parties such as Organic Content Standard (OCS) and Global Recycle Standard (GRS). The company is also a member of several industry initiatives such as Sustainable Apparel Coalition (SAC), Textile Exchange and Global Fashion Agenda.

== Recognition ==
In 2017, Ferre Yarns, S.A., received the innovative company award from la Fundación Textil Algodonera for its production of circular yarns. In 2018, Ferre Yarns, S.A., received the Aitex Business Award in the Sustainability category for its Recover project. In November 2021, Recover received the Ryan Young Climate+ Award in the Climate Leader category granted by Textile Exchange. Shortly after, the company received a Drapers Award in the Disruptor category.

In May 2022, Recover won the Green Product Award 2022 in the Fashion category. In September 2022, Recover won the ITMF Sustainability & Innovation Award at the ITMF Annual Conference 2022 in Davos.
