= Gary Tovar =

Music business consultant

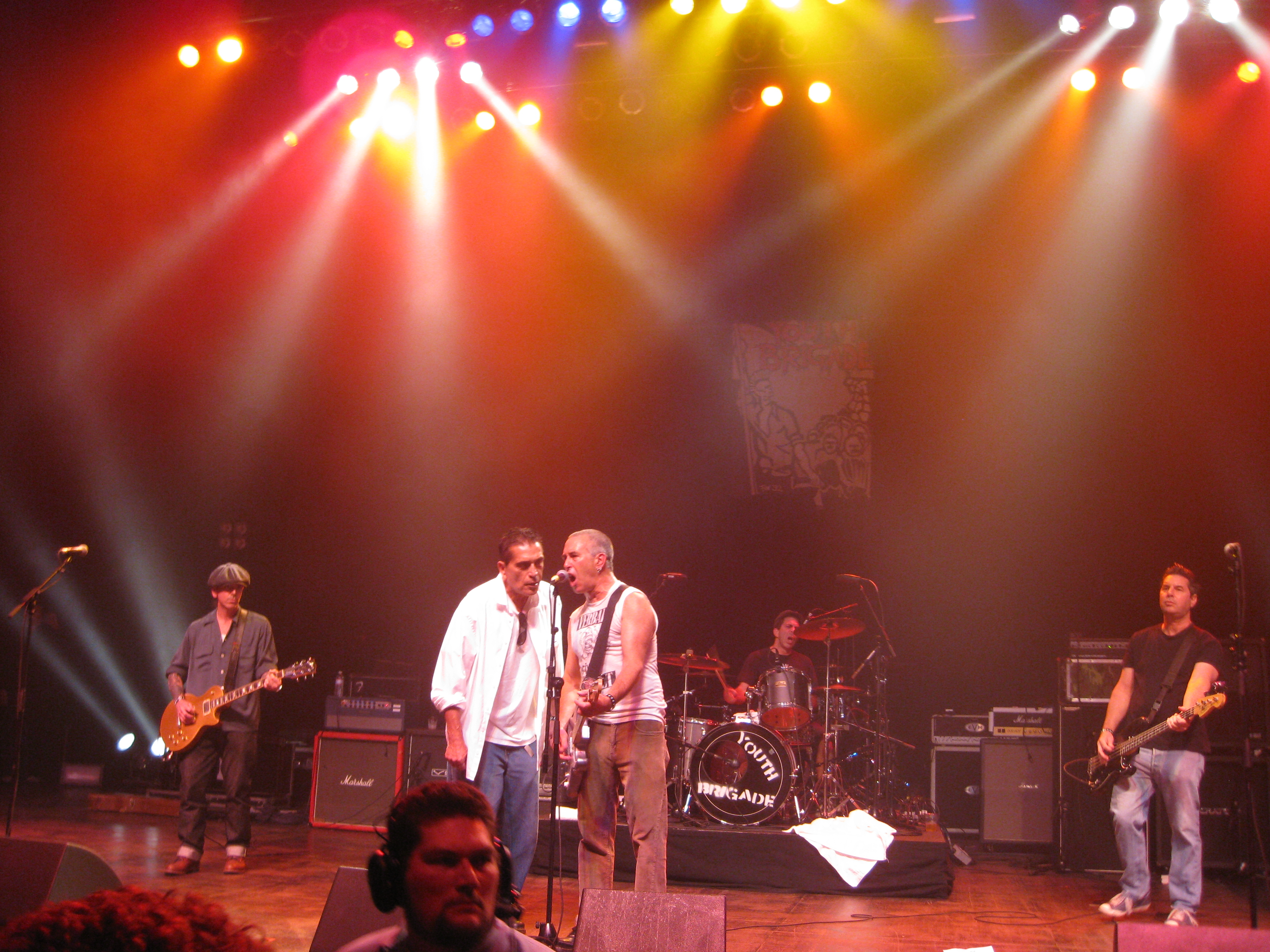
Youth Brigade performing December 17, 2011 at the Santa Monica Civic Auditorium in Santa Monica, California as part of the GV30 event. Left to right: guitarist Jonny Wickersham, Gary Tovar of Goldenvoice Productions, singer/guitarist Shawn Stern, drummer Mark Stern, and bassist Adam Stern.

Gary Tovar is a music business consultant and former music promoter. He founded the music concert business Goldenvoice Productions, which promotes the widely-attended Coachella music festival. In 1991, Tovar was arrested on charges relating to drug trafficking from Arizona.

== Early life and drug trafficking ==
Tovar was born in Los Angeles and began smuggling illicit goods as a 14-year-old when he brought fireworks into the US from Tijuana in Mexico, influenced by someone referred to as LaRue, who was connected to Timothy Leary's The Brotherhood of Eternal Love. Tovar later focusing on smuggling marijuana seeds for growers, sourcing them from US servicemen on furlough from the Vietnam War. The strains that he imported included Thai stick and Acapulco Gold, the latter helping to inspire the name of his music promotion company. He earned millions of dollars before his arrest by federal drug agents on March 9, 1991. He fought conspiracy charges from Los Angeles County Jail before being imprisoned in October 1992 for seven years on four counts relating to trafficking from Arizona.

== Music promotion ==
Tovar's interest in music promotion developed in 1981, when his younger sister told him that the police were stifling the development of punk rock music in southern California. This was three years after he and his sister had attended the Winterland Ballroom in San Francisco to see the last concert performed by the Sex Pistols. The punk rock genre was not popular with promoters or authorities, mainly because of its association with violence, but Tovar believes that, "We had every right to perform and every right to this culture," and he was not perturbed when put under pressure by the police. He considered punk to be the successor to the aging hippie ethos and he caught an anti-establishment adolescent wave, saying that "The hippies were getting old and turning into yuppies. They behaved toward their children as their parents had to them." The business was at first called Golden Voice, but the words were later combined.

Splitting his time between homes in Santa Barbara and Huntington Beach, Tovar promoted his first show in Santa Barbara on December 4, 1981. That featured the US bands T.S.O.L., Shattered Faith and Rhino 39. Basing his Goldenvoice business in Huntington Beach, he gained a reputation for being an atypical promoter: he did not take advantage of the performers, instead he paid them reasonable rates for their work. Because of his business practices he soon became influential in the music promotion business in California. He also had influence beyond the state through his booking agency, which assisted bands such as The Vandals and Social Distortion in their national breakthroughs.

In 1982, Tovar visited Britain on a scouting mission and eventually, using money obtained through his smuggling operations, financed shows in Los Angeles by British punk bands such as the Anti-Nowhere League, The Damned, GBH, Public Image Ltd and Siouxsie and the Banshees. A highlight was a series of monthly concerts involving international punk bands held at the Grand Olympic Auditorium in the years around the time of the 1984 Los Angeles Olympic Games. His shows there, which featured groups including the Dead Kennedys and Bad Religion, were cheaply priced and attracted over 4,000 fans, twice as many as were attending similar events in New York City. His promotions ultimately lost money—he estimated his losses between three and four million dollars over a ten-year period—but they did provide a means for him to launder money from his illegal drug business. In addition to financial losses, there had been resistance from many to the music and increasing violence, including three major riots in 1983. He has said that,

We were ahead! We had the resources ... enough to gamble. And be very daring and bring over bands who were ahead of their time. Some of the bands, they would come through, and people would tell me six months later how I should get 'em. We were ahead of the fans in a lot of ways. And I paid for it dearly by losing money.

The Olympic Auditorium shows ended in 1985 as interest waned but Goldenvoice moved successfully into other venues such as Fender's Ballroom, The Waters Club, and the John Anson Ford Amphitheatre, where tickets for concert by the Ramones were sold for $5 USD. The business promoted some of the first concerts by bands such as Nirvana and Red Hot Chili Peppers, expanding beyond punk to be in the vanguard of the speed metal, Goth and alternative music movements. In 1985, he employed Rick Van Santen, who managed 45 Grave, and the following year he met and employed Paul Tollett, an upcoming ska promoter.

Tovar was involved with Goldenvoice until 6:30 am on March 8, 1991 when the DEA broke down his door and took him into custody. After being denied bail, Tovar signed the business over to Tollett and Van Santen free of charge. Goldenvoice launched the Coachella Festival in 1999. Tollett and Tovar remain friends, and Tovar attends Coachella every year as well as operating the "Tovar and Otis" handmade merchandise tent with his long time artist and merch partner Bad Otis Link. Tovar also remains a consultant to the company. Rick Van Santen died in 2003.

== Later life ==
Tovar has a medical marijuana card and is no longer involved in illegal activities, describing his current interests as "English fun". He believes that the present-day movement towards legalization of marijuana in the US and the fact that music from punks such as The Ramones is played in such commonplace settings as elevators vindicates his past maverick activities. He organized a multi-night festival called GV30 at the Santa Monica Civic Auditorium in December 2011 to celebrate the 30th anniversary of Goldenvoice. This event caused Black Flag to begin performing again.
