= Textile recycling =

Method of reusing or reprocessing used clothing, fibrous material and rags

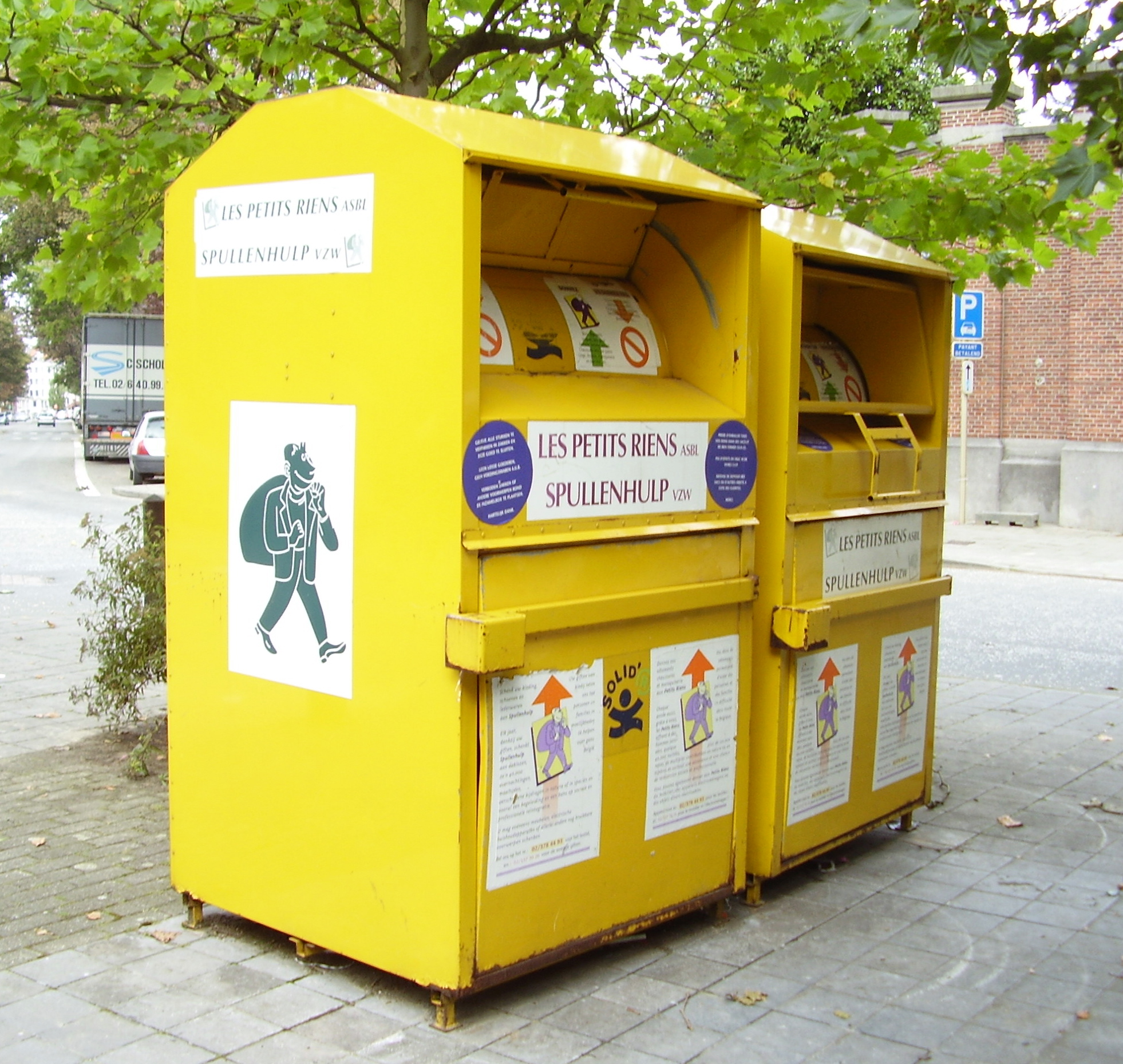
Textiles collection boxes in Brussels

Textile recycling is the process of recovering fiber, yarn, or fabric and reprocessing the material into new, useful products. Textile waste is split into pre-consumer and post-consumer waste and is sorted into five different categories derived from a pyramid model. Textiles can be either reused or mechanically/chemically recycled.

There has been a shift in recent years toward recycling textiles because of new regulations in several countries. In response, companies are developing products from both post-consumer waste and recycled materials such as plastics. Results from academic studies demonstrate that textile reuse and recycling are more advantageous than incineration and landfilling.

The speed of clothing consumption has increased substantially since the late 1990s across the world. All aspects of fast fashion have elements that are not environmentally friendly, and the amounts of waste from disposal of textiles into the garbage system is increasing beyond the industry's capabilities. The fast fashion industry currently has little to do with the end of life cycle of clothing. Some fast fashion companies collect and export their disposed textiles to developing countries for charity, but because charities are beginning to turn away fast fashion for its cheap production methods, organizations are facing challenges in generating sustainable solutions to counter social and soon governmental pressure. There are many organizations that provide educational tools on how to reuse and recycle textiles to interested individuals, such as "Human Bridge (charitable organization)". Many retail and textile chains that encourage recycling or reuse provide incentives to do so. For example, Lindex offered a rebate to customers who turned in their clothes.

There are organizations that work to recycle the material into new usable materials for a wide variety of industry needs. Working with the Swedish Red Cross, the Swedish Prison and Probation Service is able to provide textile packing material to the shipping industry; additionally, recycling programs like StenaRecycling are finding new ways to use textiles in various industrial ways, creating construction materials, stuffing, and new and improved textiles.

Polyester and cotton dominate the textile industry with the synthetic fiber polyester exceeding production of cotton since 2002. Fast fashion has caused a spike in textile waste, bringing waste management to the attention of many individuals. After clothing is reused until it is beyond usable for its given function, recycling it through a mechanical or chemical process is the next step. One concern with recycling textiles is the loss of "virgin material", but chemical recycling can extract the "virgin materials" like protein-based and cellulosic fibers to produce new products. The deterioration of material to provide new products is the process of mechanical recycling.

== Types ==
There are four types of recycling: upcycling, downcycling, closed-loop, and open-loop recycling. Upcycling is the process of using a textile to create something higher quality than the original. Downcycling is using a textile in a way that is less than the original value. Closed-loop recycling is the reuse of one textile over and over again to create the same piece. Open-loop recycling is the process of creating something new with the textile piece. The EU is currently taking initiative to enforce circularity and closed-loop recycling in the clothing cycle, as well as encouraging a less wasteful lifestyle by supporting second-hand and organic clothing pieces – organic in this case being cotton, silk, etc. In the United States, New York City has begun working with natural fibers like bamboo and hemp to make not just clothing, but bags as well.

== Technology ==
There are many technologies that assist in the recycling of textile products:

1. Anaerobic digestion of textile waste – decomposition of organic cotton textile to collect methane and other biogas
2. Fermentation of textile waste for ethanol production – cotton fabric provides enhancement of bioethanol production
3. Composting of textile waste – cotton waste provides an excellent source of nutrients in compost
4. Fiber regeneration from textile waste – recovery of glucose and polyester is possible and allows for reuse of material
5. Building/construction material from textile waste – use of textiles in building materials and construction
6. Thermal recovery – incineration of remaining textiles to collect usable energy

== Waste ==
Over 100 billion garments are produced annually, most of which end up in incinerators or landfills. The EPA reported that in 2018 alone, 17 million tons of textile municipal solid waste (MSW) were generated. The fashion industry is often cited as the second biggest polluter next to the oil industry. Textile recycling decreases landfill space, creates less pollution, and reduces the consumption of power and water. Most materials used in textile recycling can be split into two categories: pre-consumer and post-consumer waste.

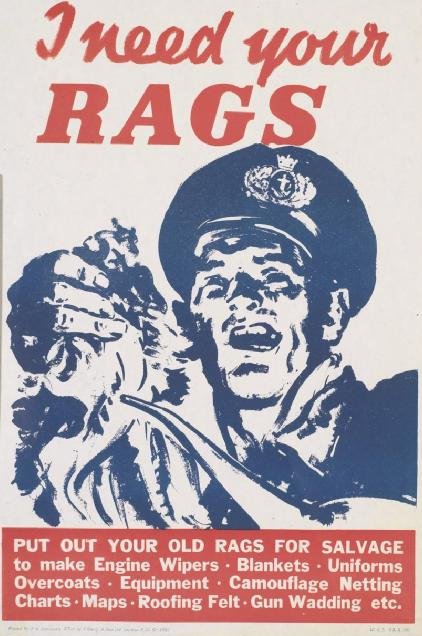
Poster promoting textile recycling, World War II, United Kingdom

=== Pre-consumer ===
Pre-consumer waste involves secondary materials from the textile, fiber, and cotton industries. These products are repurposed for other industries, i.e., furniture, mattresses, coarse yarn, home building, automotive, paper, and apparel.

Pre-consumer can also refer to overstock or left-over garments that retailers have not been able to sell to consumers. These left-over garments are then repurposed and used to create new pieces of clothing while being environmentally sustainable.A 2026 study that followed a cotton T-shirt through two life cycles found that about 44% of the fibre was lost during manufacturing, before the garment reached consumers, and that under current conditions a maximum of 17% of the original fibre could be recycled into a new T-shirt.

=== Post-consumer ===
Post-consumer waste consists of textile garments and household articles that have been discarded by their owners. These textile articles are typically discarded because they are damaged, worn out, or outdated. 85% of post-consumer waste in the United States, however, is found in landfills. The remaining post-consumer waste can be directed towards second-hand retailers to be resold or passed on to warehouses dedicated to textile recycling.

=== Realizing circularity ===
Workshops hosted by the National Institute of Standards and Technology are freely available in NIST.SP.1500-207, to include challenges formalizing the definitions and data that will be required for understanding the future of circularity for the textile waste stream.

== Categories ==
Textiles are sorted into categories according to the pyramid model, which organizes textiles by their quality and usability. These category placements determine which processes are used to recycle or reuse the textile. Such categories are: textiles for used clothing markets, textiles for conversion, wiping and polishing cloths, textiles sent to landfills and incinerators, and diamonds.

=== Diamonds ===
Diamonds are older, trendier clothing items that are from high-end, well-known brands. Diamonds make up 1–2% of recycled textiles. Despite being the smallest category, diamonds generate the largest amount of profit per item for recycling companies. Clothing and accessories that are considered diamonds include couture, Harley Davidson, Levi's, Ralph Lauren, and luxury fibers (for example cashmere). These second-hand clothing articles are in high demand and can be sold online, in retail boutiques, or in vintage shops.

=== Landfill and incineration ===
Around 7% of recycled textile products are either incinerated or placed in a landfill. Textiles that are placed in landfills have no value and are unable to be repurposed; this process is costly and is avoided when possible. Textiles can also be incinerated to produce electrical energy. This practice is more common in Europe than in the United States because European boiler systems have higher capabilities than American boiler systems. Although incinerating municipal solid waste (MSW) is not yet feasible in the United States, over two thirds of MSW is incinerated in countries such as Denmark, Japan, and Switzerland. The energy values of burning MSW have been comparable with oil in terms of calories; however, there are obstacles to this process. These obstacles include increasing incineration efficiency and reducing harmful byproducts of incineration.

=== Wiping and polishing cloths ===
Around 17% of used textiles are sorted into the wiping and polishing cloth category. These textiles are deemed un-wearable and are then used to create wiping and polishing cloths. Wiping and polishing cloths can be made from a combination of oleophilic and hydrophilic fibers which are often useful in industrial application. Textiles, such as T-shirts, are commonly used to create these cloths due to their naturally absorbent cotton fibers.

=== Conversion to new products ===
29% of textile waste is reengineered into new products if deemed unusable. Usability depends on whether or not the textiles are stained or torn beyond repair. Shoddy and mungo are the two main results of the reengineering process.

Shoddy involves creating new yarn products from old materials, and is one of the most historical examples of textile recycling. One of the largest producers of shoddy yarn is Panipat in North India, which has over 300 mills. The majority of shoddy in Panipat is used to create knit blankets, making up over 90% of the blankets that are given to communities in disaster relief.

Mungo was invented after shoddy and refers to the process of using textile clippings to make wool. This wool is exported to European countries, whose cooler climates and flammability regulations result in a greater need for mungo.

Shoddy and mungo can be utilized for both high and low quality products. These reengineered fibers have been used in cashmere sweaters and in stuffing for furniture, automobiles, and punching bags.

=== Used clothing markets ===
48% of textiles are sorted into the used clothing markets category. Western countries export used textiles to developing countries or to disaster relief. In developing nations, used Western textiles are highly valued as they are often more affordable than local textiles. Used Western textiles are also sold to the lower and middle classes in more developed countries whose incomes are not large enough to purchase more-expensive, local textiles. Because textile exportation is a global industry, exporters must be conscious of the varying trade regulations and restrictions in different countries.

== Processing ==
=== Reuse ===
Textile reuse is the preferred processing method because it extends the original product's lifetime. Reuse occurs when textile owners rent, trade, swap, borrow, inherit products through second-hand stores, garage sales, online/flea markets, or charities. In reusing textiles, the textile is sometimes changed through cutting and sewing or through decorating the textiles with paints, patches and other textiles in a process referred to as DIY.

=== Recycling ===
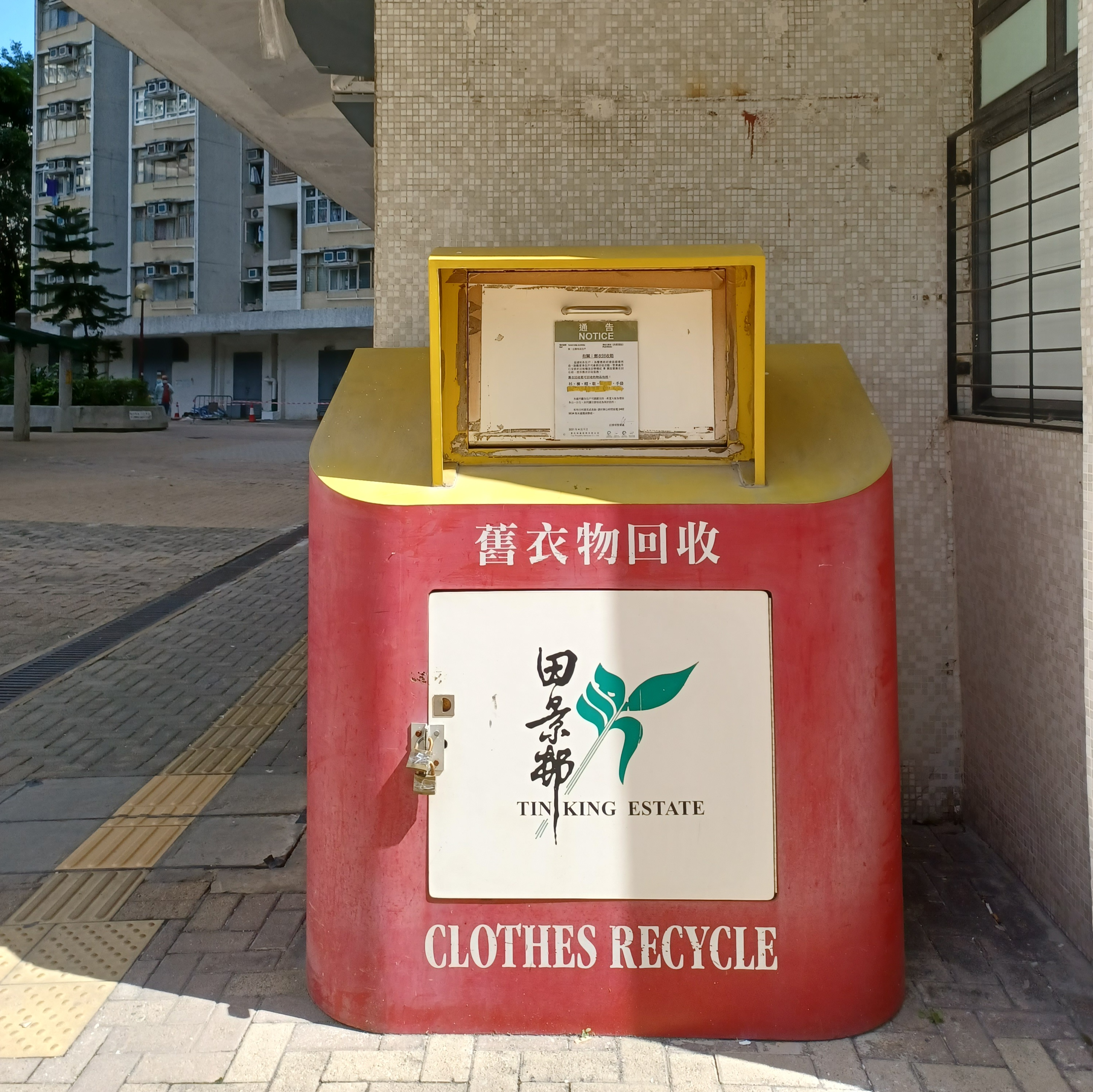
Clothes recycling bin in Tin King Estate, Hong Kong

==== Mechanical ====
Mechanical processing is a recycling method in which textile fabric is broken down while the fibers are still preserved. Once shredded down, these fibers can be spun to create new fabrics. This is the most commonly used technique to recycle textiles and is a process that is particularly well developed for cotton textiles. Mechanical processing protocols can differ depending on the material, so it also requires several levels of sorting before the process begins.

Textiles must be separated by fabric composition and by color to avoid re-dying and bleaching of materials. Once sorted, the textile materials can then be shredded, washed, and separated into smaller fibers. These individual fibers are then aligned together in a process known as carding in preparation to be spun together. Some fibers, including cotton, must be spun along with a carrier fiber to maintain higher quality. These carrier fibers are most commonly cotton, organic cotton, or polyester. Once the fibers are spun into new yarn, they can be used to create new textiles. This process functions as a semi-closed loop of recycling. The number of times a material can be recycled is dependent on the quality of the fibers, which decreases with each cycle of mechanical processing.

Mechanical processing can also be used with materials other than textiles. One common example of this is polyester. In the case of polyester, the recycled materials are plastic bottles made of polyethylene terephthalate (PET). In a similar manner to textiles, plastics are sorted by color and type when they arrive at recycling facilities. The plastic is then shredded and washed to break it down and remove contaminants. The dried plastic remnants are molded into PET pellets and then undergo extrusion to create new fibers. These new fibers can then be used to create new textiles.

==== Chemical ====
Chemical processing occurs when textile reuse is infeasible. This process is not yet widely implemented, but there are companies that are researching and integrating chemical recycling. The major small scale production sites are from Eco Circle, Worn Again Technologies, Evrnu, and Ioncell.

Chemical recycling is used on synthetic fibers, such as polyethylene terephthalate (PET). These synthetic fibers can be broken down to create fibers, yarn, and textiles. For PET, the starting materials are first broken down to the molecular level by using chemicals that facilitate glycolysis, methanolysis, hydrolysis, and/or ammonolysis. This act of depolymerization also removes contaminants from the starting material such as dyes and unwanted fibers. From here, the material is polymerized and used to produce textile products.

Unlike the mechanical method of recycling, chemical recycling produces high-quality fibers similar to the original fiber used. Therefore, no new fibers are needed to support the product of the chemical process. Different chemicals and processes are used for other materials such as nylon and cellulose-based fibers, but the overall structure of the process is the same.

== Textiles made from recycled materials ==
Many companies develop their products from a combination of recycled post-consumer textile waste as well as other recycled materials such as plastics. This can be done for textiles other than clothing as well.

One specific region that is more progressive in applications of recycled textiles is Scandinavia, which has created mainstream market products. In Sweden, companies such as Lindex and H&M are including pre-consumer and post-consumer waste fibers within their new clothing lines.

== Growth ==
=== A shift toward recycled textiles ===
New regulations for the textile industry have been introduced in several countries that favor the use of recycled materials. On March 30, 2022, the European Commission published the EU Strategy for Sustainable and Circular Textiles which outlines the EU's action plan to achieve better sustainability and regulation within the textile industry. The European Commission's goal for 2030 is to encourage consumers to invest in high quality products rather than fast fashion, and to ensure all textile products are durable, whether they are recycled materials or not. The EU's strategy includes regulating overproduction, reducing the release of microplastics during production, and utilizing EU Extended Producer Responsibility to ensure producers are acting sustainably.

In response to shifting consumer expectations, investments in textile recycling companies have increased to achieve better sustainability in the textile industry. Inditex and Bill Gates' Breakthrough Energy Ventures invested in the start-up recycling company Circ in July 2022, which has patented new technologies to reengineer used fibers. In July 2021, H&M and Adidas invested in the chemical recycling company Infinite Fiber Company (IFC) which produces a reengineered fiber that is similar to cotton and is biodegradable. Goldman Sachs led an investment in mechanically recycled cotton company Recover Textile Systems in June 2022.

Many luxury fashion brands are publicly displaying their investment in sustainability approaches, with a common goal to shift towards circular systems and utilizing re-engineered and/or biodegradable materials in their collections.

=== Environmental impact ===
Textile reuse and textile recycling processes are the most environmentally friendly methods of processing textiles, while incineration and landfilling are considered to be the least environmentally friendly. When comparing textile reuse to textile recycling, textile reuse is more advantageous. A Swedish study found that for each tonne of textile waste, textile reuse can save 8 tonnes of CO_{2} in terms of global warming potential (GWP) and 164 GJ of energy usage. In comparison, textile recycling saves 5.6 tonnes of CO_{2} in terms of GWP and 116 GJ of energy usage.

A 2025 study modeling textile waste management in Australia estimated that mechanical recycling had the lowest carbon footprint among the four treatment scenarios examined. The estimated emissions were 5,368 kg of CO_{2}-equivalent per tonne of textile waste for mechanical recycling, compared with 6,401 kg for chemical recycling and 8,310 kg for landfilling.

There are a few circumstances under which recycling and reuse might be less effective. For instance, regarding recycling, the benefits might be offset if the replacement rates are relatively low, if recycling is energized by fossil fuels, or if the avoided manufacture procedures are clean. Also, with respect to reuse, the environmental impact of transport may surpass the upsides of the avoided manufacturing, unless the use life of the reused item is considerably prolonged. However, effective textile recycling systems require efficient collection, sorting and processing infrastructure. These circumstances should be taken into account when advocating, designing and implementing new textile recycling and reuse procedures. Textile recycling also helps reduce landfill waste and supports more sustainable use of natural resources such as water, energy and raw textile fibers.

=== Textile collection systems ===
Textile collection systems play an important role in the recycling process. Used clothing and textile products are often collected through donation bins, charity organizations, municipal programs and specialized recycling companies. Effective collection systems help increase recycling rates and reduce textile waste sent to landfills.

== See also ==
- Global trade of secondhand clothing
- Environmental impact of fashion
- Sustainable fashion
- Circular economy
- Waste management
