= Speedway, Indiana =

Town in Indiana, United States

- Town
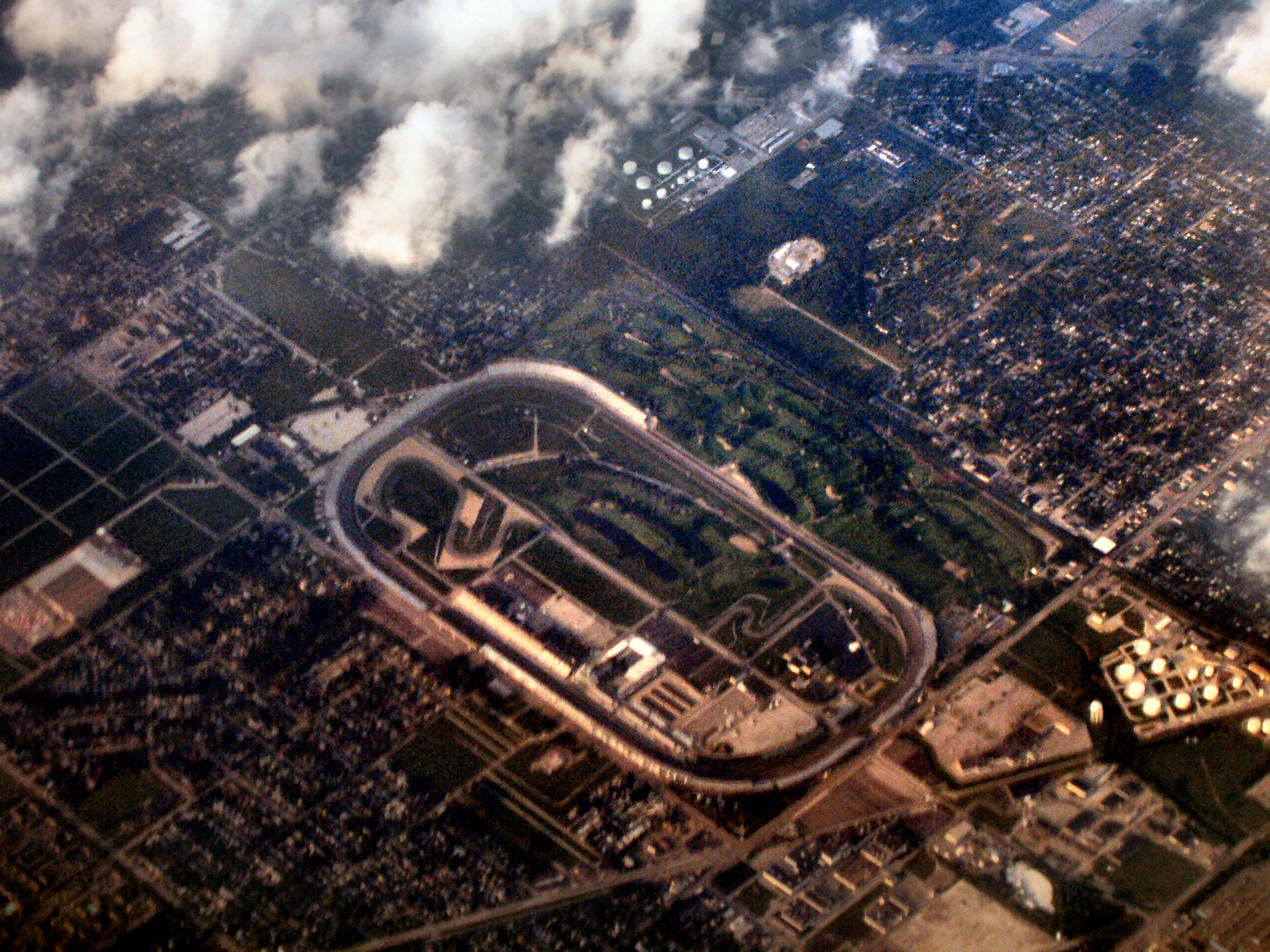
- Indianapolis Motor Speedway and the town of Speedway in 2005

- Flag Seal Logo
- Nicknames: "Home of the 500"; "Racing Capital of the World"
- Location in Marion County, Indiana
- Coordinates: 39°47′17″N 86°14′27″W
- Country: United States
- State: Indiana
- County: Marion
- Township: Wayne
- Incorporated: July 14, 1926

Government
  - Town Manager: Grant Kleinhenz

Area
  - Total: 4.79 sq mi (12.40 km^{2})
  - Land: 4.79 sq mi (12.40 km^{2})
  - Water: 0.0039 sq mi (0.01 km^{2})
- Elevation: 728 ft (222 m)

Population (2020)
  - Total: 13,952
  - Density: 2,915.2/sq mi (1,125.55/km^{2})
- Time zone: UTC-5 (EST)
  - Summer (DST): UTC-4 (EDT)
- ZIP code: 46224
- Area code: 317
- FIPS code: 18-71828
- Website: www.speedwayin.gov

Speedway is a town in Wayne Township, Marion County, Indiana, United States. The population was 13,952 at the 2020 census, up from 11,812 in 2010. Speedway, which is an enclave of Indianapolis, is the home of the Indianapolis Motor Speedway.

== History ==
Speedway was laid out in 1912 as a residential suburb. It took its name from the Indianapolis Motor Speedway, constructed three years earlier. It is an early example of a residential community planned for the industrial plants located nearby. Carl G. Fisher, James A. Allison, Frank H. Wheeler, and Arthur C. Newby, founders of the Indianapolis Motor Speedway, planned the suburb of Speedway west of the track. Fisher and Allison owned plants that needed workers, the Prest-O-Lite factory and Allison Engine Company. The investors' goal was to create a city without horses, where residents would drive automobiles, as well as participate in creating mechanical parts for new modes of transportation.

Speedway was incorporated as a town in July 1926. The Speedway Historic District was listed on the National Register of Historic Places in 2005. As one of the four excluded cities in Marion County under the Unigov legislation, Speedway has a police department from that is independent of the Indianapolis Metropolitan Police Department.

== Geography ==
Speedway is located in western Marion County. It is 5 miles (8 km) west-northwest of downtown Indianapolis.

According to the U.S. Census Bureau, Speedway has a total area of 4.79 square miles (12.41 km^{2}), of which 0.004 square miles (0.01 km^{2}), or 0.08%, are water. The town is drained by Eagle Creek, which runs along the southwest edge of town, and its tributaries Dry Run and Little Eagle Creek, which flow past or around the speedway. Eagle Creek continues east to join the White River in southwest Marion County.

=== Climate ===
The climate in this area is characterized by hot, humid summers and generally mild to cool winters. According to the Köppen Climate Classification system, Speedway has a humid subtropical climate, Cfa on climate maps. With a January daily mean of −2 °C (28 °F) however, Speedway is very close to the humid continental type.

Climate data for Speedway
Month	Jan	Feb	Mar	Apr	May	Jun	Jul	Aug	Sep	Oct	Nov	Dec	Year
Mean daily maximum °F (°C)	34 (1)	39 (4)	48 (9)	63 (17)	72 (22)	81 (27)	84 (29)	82 (28)	77 (25)	64 (18)	50 (10)	39 (4)	61 (16)
Daily mean °F (°C)	28 (−2)	32 (0)	39 (4)	52 (11)	63 (17)	72 (22)	75 (24)	73 (23)	66 (19)	55 (13)	41 (5)	32 (0)	52 (11)
Mean daily minimum °F (°C)	19 (−7)	23 (−5)	32 (0)	41 (5)	50 (10)	61 (16)	64 (18)	63 (17)	54 (12)	43 (6)	32 (0)	25 (−4)	41 (5)
Average precipitation inches (mm)	2.8 (72)	2.5 (63)	3.8 (96)	3.7 (94)	4.1 (103)	4.0 (102)	4.0 (102)	3.3 (84)	3.1 (78)	2.7 (68)	3.2 (82)	2.9 (73)	40.0 (1,017)

== Demographics ==
Historical population
Census	Pop.	Note	%±
1930	1,420		—
1940	2,325		63.7%
1950	5,498		136.5%
1960	9,624		75.0%
1970	14,523		50.9%
1980	12,641		−13.0%
1990	13,092		3.6%
2000	12,881		−1.6%
2010	11,812		−8.3%
2020	13,952		18.1%
U.S. Decennial Census

=== 2020 census ===
As of the 2020 census, Speedway had a population of 13,952. The median age was 35.4 years. 22.4% of residents were under the age of 18 and 13.4% were 65 years of age or older. For every 100 females, there were 94.7 males, and for every 100 females age 18 and over, there were 92.8 males.

100.0% of residents lived in urban areas, while 0.0% lived in rural areas.

There were 6,335 households, of which 28.1% had children under the age of 18 living in them. Of all households, 32.9% were married-couple households, 25.5% were households with a male householder and no spouse or partner present, and 33.9% were households with a female householder and no spouse or partner present. About 37.2% of all households were made up of individuals, and 11.7% had someone living alone who was 65 years of age or older.

There were 6,731 housing units, of which 5.9% were vacant. The homeowner vacancy rate was 1.2% and the rental vacancy rate was 5.5%.

Racial composition as of the 2020 census
Race	Number	Percent
White	7,858	56.3%
Black or African American	3,658	26.2%
American Indian and Alaska Native	86	0.6%
Asian	363	2.6%
Native Hawaiian and Other Pacific Islander	4	0.0%
Some other race	1,035	7.4%
Two or more races	948	6.8%
Hispanic or Latino (of any race)	1,656	11.9%

=== 2010 census ===
As of the census of 2010, 11,812 people, 5,550 households, and 2,931 families resided in the town. The population density was 2,481.5 inhabitants per square mile (958.1/km^{2}). The 6,709 housing units averaged 1,409.5 per square mile (544.2/km^{2}). The racial makeup of the town was 74.2% White, 16.7% African American, 0.3% Native American, 2.0% Asian, 4.4% from other races, and 2.3% from two or more races. Hispanics or Latinos of any race were 7.6% of the population.

Of the 5,550 households, 26.9% had children under the age of 18 living with them, 32.4% were married couples living together, 15.3% had a female householder with no husband present, 5.2% had a male householder with no wife present, and 47.2% were not families. About 39.9% of all households were made up of individuals, and 12.9% had someone living alone who was 65 years of age or older. The average household size was 2.13 and the average family size was 2.84.

The median age in the town was 37.8 years. About 21.7% of residents were under the age of 18; 10.8% were between the ages of 18 and 24; 26.7% were from 25 to 44; 25.8% were from 45 to 64; and 14.8% were 65 years of age or older. The gender makeup of the town was 48.3% male and 51.7% female.

=== 2000 census ===
As of the census of 2000, 12,882 people, 6,151 households, and 3,278 families resided in the town. The 6,151 households had 24.5% with children under the age of 18 living with them, 36.6% married couples living together, 12.5% female householders with no husband present, and 46.7% not families. In the town, the population was spread out, with 20.9% under the age of 18, 10.1% from 18 to 24, 31.5% from 25 to 44, 20.2% from 45 to 64, and 17.2% who were 65 years of age or older. The median age was 37 years. For every 100 females, there were 89.2 males. For every 100 females age 18 and over, there were 84.9 males.

The median income for a household in the town was $37,713, and for a family was $49,005. Males had a median income of $36,756 versus $26,954 for females. The per capita income for the town was $21,468. About 5.6% of families and 8.8% of the population were below the poverty line, including 7.7% of those under age 18 and 9.5% of those age 65 or over.

== Education ==
- The School Town of Speedway has six campuses, including the Speedway Senior High School, and an enrollment of approximately 1,650 students.
- St Christopher School

The town has a lending library, the Speedway Public Library.

== Economy ==
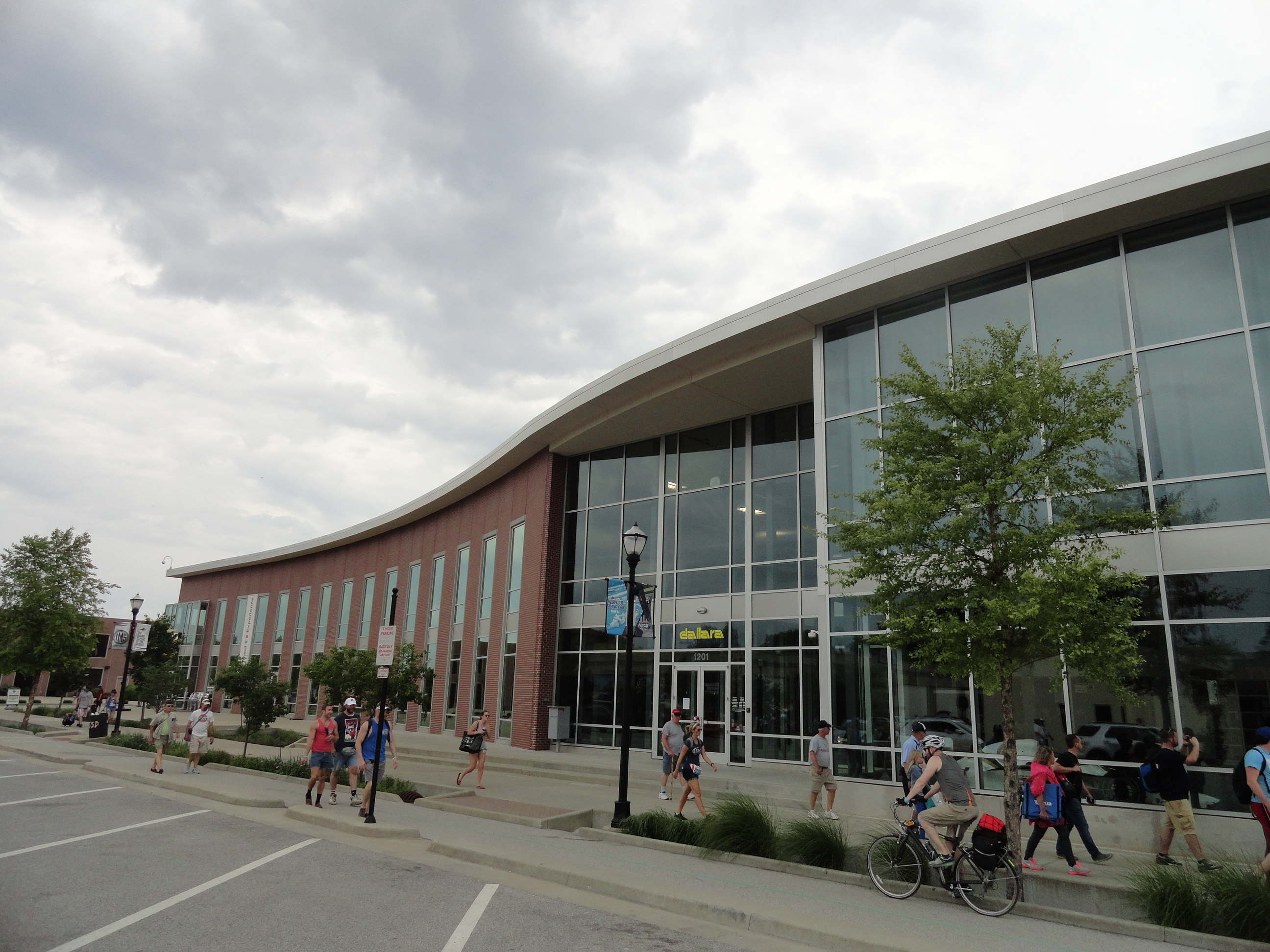
Dallara IndyCar Factory

In addition to the Indianapolis Motor Speedway itself, several related companies are located south of the racetrack, including the United States Auto Club headquarters, the Dallara racecar factory, racing teams A. J. Foyt Racing, and Harding Racing, and the Speedway Indoor karting racetrack. Also, Allison Transmission has a factory nearby.

== Notable people ==
- Donald Davidson, historian
- Joyce DeWitt, actress
- Ronnie Duman, racing driver
- Barbara Higbie, jazz musician and composer
- Mason Jobst, ice hockey player
- Tony Kiritsis, American kidnapper
- J. Emmett McManamon, 33rd Indiana Attorney General
- Stevie Reeves, racing driver
- Zachary Tinkle, racing driver
- Adedamola Ajani – college football offensive lineman for the Indiana Hoosiers

== Sister cities ==
- Motegi, Tochigi, Japan
- Varano de' Melegari, Italy

== See also ==
- Burger Chef murders
- Mug-n-Bun
- Speedway bombings
- List of cities surrounded by another city
- List of neighborhoods in Indianapolis
