= Wade A. Kimberlin =

- Born: 1970 (age 54–55); Houston, Texas, U.S.
- Occupation: Novelist; Short story writer
- Subject: Science Fiction; Fantasy

Wade A. Kimberlin (born Houston, Texas, in 1970) is the author of many science-fiction and fantasy short stories, and one science-fiction novel.

As Wade grew up in Houston, he got an early start reading the fantasy and science-fiction works of Tolkien and Robert A. Heinlein. After high school, he went to study at Oklahoma Christian College, but remained undecided on a major. He left college in 1989 to join the United States Air Force, where he still serves today.

Even with working full-time and raising a family with wife Karin, Wade found time to write. He completed his first novel, a space opera called Electronic Echoes of the Mind, in 2001, which got picked up for publication by Mundania Press shortly thereafter.

Wade is working on a sequel to Electronic Echoes of the Mind.
