= The Rainy Daze =

US musical group

The Rainy Daze was a psychedelic pop group formed in Denver, Colorado in 1965. They were composed of singer/guitarist Tim Gilbert with his brother Kip on drums, lead guitarist Mac Ferris, bassist Sam Fuller, and keyboardist Bob Heckendorf.

The group started as a covers act, nevertheless parlaying a string of frat party gigs into a local television appearance that reportedly caught the attention of famed producer Phil Spector, who extended a management contract.

The group released an album, That Acapulco Gold, and the title song (written by Tim Gilbert and his roommate, John Carter) made it to #70 on the Billboard Hot 100 in 1967 but was pulled once it was realized it was a pro-marijuana song (see Acapulco Gold). Tim Gilbert was co-author with John S. Carter of the gold record / "million seller" song Incense and Peppermints (song) by Strawberry Alarm Clock.

Kip Gilbert (born Christopher Gilbert) died of cancer on December 11, 2002, at age 57.

Sam Fuller (born Samuel Fuller in Denver on May 17, 1946) died of cancer on October 29, 2008, at age 62.

== Discography ==
That Acapulco Gold (1967) (Uni 3002)

- Track listing:
1. "Absurd Bird" (2:57)
2. "Baby I Need Your Loving" (3:31)
3. "Weatherman" (2:30)
4. "Out of a Calico Dream" (2:26)
5. "Medley: Shake/Knock on Wood/Respect" (3:57)
6. "Discount City" (2:37)
7. "That Acapulco Gold" (2:23)
8. "Try a Little Harder" (2:30)
9. "For What It's Worth" (2:56)
10. "In My Mind Lives a Forest" (2:45)
11. "Snow and Ice and Burning Sand" (3:11)

== Singles ==
1. "That Acapulco Gold" (2:23) / "In My Mind Lives A Forest" (2:45) (Chicory 404)
2. "That Acapulco Gold" (2:23) / "In My Mind Lives A Forest" (2:45) (Uni 55002)
3. "Good Morning Mr. Smith" (2:15) / "Discount City" (2:37) (Uni 55011)
4. "Blood Of Oblivion" (2:35) / "Stop Sign" (2:42) (Uni 55026)
5. "If We Stick Together" (2:50) / "Early October" (2:43) (Tim Gilbert solo release) (Uni 55045)
6. "Make Me Laugh" (2:07) / "My Door Is Always Open" (2:46) (White Whale WW279)
