= Cut and sew =

Process in making garments

Cut and sew is a manufacturing process used in garment factories to make custom garments. A whole piece of any fabric is first placed on a cutting table or run through a cutting machine. A garment piece or shape is then cut out and sent for sewing through the garment assembly. A cut-and-sewn garment can include any custom measurements and fabric.

== Process ==
Cut-and-sew manufacturing includes the following steps: pattern making, maker making, cutting, sewing, finishing, and quality control.

== Usage ==
The process is prevalent in the urban fashion industry, where designers can either screen-print a design on a pre-made garment, such as a t-shirt or hooded sweatshirt, or create the entire garment from scratch. In the latter case, the designer of the graphic plays a role in creating the garment.

== Niche ==
Cut and sew garments are generally of higher quality and price than a mass-produced items. Brands like A Bathing Ape, Diamond Supply Co., Marc Ecko and Kanati Clothing Company offer 'cut and sew' lines, most commonly items such as button shirts and other higher end clothing items.

In the apparel manufacturing industry, these garments are sewn from purchased fabric, as distinct from knitting fabric and then turning that knit fabric into garments.

Earlier approaches, fabrics came from looms, and had to take on their shape on the loom. Materials such as leather used to require special thread, thicker needles, and sharper tools.

The cut-and-sew manufacturing process is essential to apparel because it gives more control over designs and patterns.

The process of working with a cut-and-sew factory starts with sending them a tech pack and/or providing a sew-by sample, as well as fabric and any trimmings. The factory returns a pre-production sample, which can be adjusted or approved for production.
