= Speedway bombings =

Series of bombings in the United States

- Emergency personnel attend to a victim of the Speedway bomber
- Location: Speedway, Indiana, U.S.
- Date: September 1, 1978 – September 6, 1978 (UTC-5)
- Attack type: Bombings
- Deaths: 0
- Injuries: 2
- Perpetrator: Brett Kimberlin

The Speedway bombings were a series of eight random bombings that occurred between September 1, 1978, and September 6, 1978, in Speedway, Indiana, United States. In four separate trials, drug dealer Brett Kimberlin was convicted of multiple charges related to the bombings.

== The bombings ==
On September 1, 1978, three separate explosions from improvised explosive devices placed in trash bins rocked the town of Speedway, Indiana. The damage was minor and no one was injured. Speedway authorities called on explosive experts from the Indiana State Police, the Marion County Sheriff's Department, the 64th Ordnance from nearby Fort Benjamin Harrison and specialists from the Bureau of Alcohol Tobacco and Firearms (ATF). They formed a 100-strong task force to solve the case. The devices were simple homemade bombs constructed from soda cans packed with Tovex 200 and triggered with a rudimentary timing device. Two more blasts hit Speedway the following Saturday, with another the day after at the local bowling alley. The next day, a device exploded under the car of an off-duty Speedway police officer, who was on sick leave at the time and was not injured.

The last bombing took place on September 6, when another explosive device concealed in a gym bag detonated in the parking lot of Speedway High School shortly after a freshman football game. Injuries sustained in the explosion forced the amputation of Vietnam War veteran Carl DeLong's right leg. DeLong had spotted the bag and proceeded to kick it before removing it, causing the bomb to explode. Aside from severing his right leg, the explosion also severely injured DeLong's left leg and right hand as well as severing an artery in his wife Sandra's leg.

== Investigation ==
As no motive ever emerged for the bombings, law enforcement had no idea why they had stopped, but on September 20, 1978, federal agents arrested 27-year-old Brett Kimberlin for attempting to obtain United States Government credentials illegally. The owner of a Westside printing shop became suspicious when Kimberlin, dressed in a Defense Department security uniform, asked him to reproduce military driver's licenses with Kimberlin's picture and called the police and the United States Army. Police arrested Kimberlin when he came back to the printing shop to pick up the documents.

After obtaining a search warrant for Kimberlin's home and vehicle, investigators found wiring similar to those used on the explosive devices and "Mark Time" appliance timers in his 1970 Chevrolet Impala. A subsequent search of his home revealed more than 1,000 pounds (450 kg) of marijuana and two cases of Tovex 200, used in the IEDs, whose purchase had been traced by their lot number to Kimberlin in 1975. Pictures of Kimberlin were taken to the only local appliance store that sold the "Mark Times" and a store employee positively identified Kimberlin as the buyer of the timers. Additionally, an eyewitness came forward and identified Kimberlin as the man he saw place an explosive parcel in a trash can on September 1.

The ATF positively matched both the timers and wire found in Kimberlin's car but did not press for an immediate indictment; instead, they continued to build on their case.

== Motives ==
While no motive was established at trial, prosecutors and police believe Kimberlin went on the bombing spree to deflect attention away from an ongoing investigation of the murder of 65-year-old Julia Scyphers. Scyphers "violently disapproved" of her daughter Sandra Barton's relationship with Kimberlin as well as the "strange affection" Kimberlin paid to Barton's pre-teen daughter, who had accompanied Kimberlin on several long unsupervised out-of-state trips. On July 29, 1978, Scyphers was shot to death just outside her home. Her husband Fred Scyphers, who briefly saw the shooter, identified William Bowman as the gunman. Bowman was a close associate of Kimberlin in the drug trade but Fred, the prosecution's only witness, died shortly after the murder and Bowman was never charged. Scyphers' murder still remains unsolved.

== Trials and conviction ==
In June 1981, Kimberlin was convicted of receipt of explosives by a convicted felon and sentenced to five years in federal prison and, in December 1981, of possession of an unregistered destructive device, unlawful manufacturing of a destructive device, malicious damage by means of explosives, and malicious damage by means of explosives involving personal injury. Kimberlin received a sentence of fifty years in federal prison. His sentences, including sentences for other crimes, were aggregated to a total of fifty-one years, six months and nineteen days. After his conviction, prosecutors released yellow legal pads they had confiscated from Kimberlin which they said detailed his plans to kill key eyewitnesses and prosecutors on the case as well as stage another series of bombings to provide him with an alibi.

In 1983, the DeLong family filed a civil suit after Carl DeLong committed suicide after becoming depressed following the loss of his leg and subsequent chronic pain from the bombing. A jury ordered Kimberlin to pay the DeLong family US$1.25 million for Carl Delong's suicide and another US$360,000 to Sandra DeLong for her injuries. In 1993, an appeals court overturned the US$1.25 million for Carl Delong's suicide, but upheld the damages awarded to Mrs. Delong. In 1994 the Indiana Supreme Court overturned the appeals court ruling, restoring the original US$1.6 million judgment.

Kimberlin was paroled in November 1993 after serving thirteen years. His parole was revoked and he was returned to prison in 1997 after not making court ordered payments to the DeLong family which resulted from their successful civil suit. He was re-released in 2001.
