= Brett Kimberlin =

American drug trafficker and political activist (born 1954)

- Born: 1954 (age 71–72)
- Occupations: Musician, political activist
- Status: Released
- Convictions: Felony perjury, manufacturing and possessing a destructive device, malicious damage by explosives with personal injury, impersonating a federal officer, illegal use of a Department of Defense insignia, illegal use of the presidential seal, receipt of explosives by a convicted felon, conspiracy to distribute marijuana.
- Penalty: 51 years in prison

Brett Kimberlin (born 1954) is an American political activist who was convicted in 1980 on drug charges and of perpetrating the 1978 Speedway bombings. Since his release from prison, Kimberlin has co-founded the non-profit Justice Through Music Project and the activist organization Velvet Revolution. He has also been involved in various legal disputes, including those associated with a claim that he supplied marijuana to Dan Quayle.

== Criminal convictions ==
Shortly after graduating from high school, Kimberlin was convicted in 1973 of felony perjury for lying to a grand jury investigating drug trafficking. Kimberlin had been called before a grand jury investigating drug use at his high school and was convicted for testifying that he had not sold LSD. Kimberlin served only 21 days of a one-year sentence on this charge.

By 1976, Kimberlin's drug business was grossing hundreds of thousands of dollars a month. He invested his drug money profit in such businesses as an Earth shoe franchise. Kimberlin became a suspect in the murder of Julia Scyphers, the mother of a friend/employee of his in Speedway, Indiana, in 1978, but there is no evidence supporting these claims.

In the first six days of September 1978, a series of bombings perpetrated by Kimberlin struck Speedway. Initially, there were no injuries; however, the last bombing led to the amputation of Vietnam veteran Carl DeLong's right leg and left DeLong and his wife with several other injuries that required significant hospitalization and rehabilitation. DeLong committed suicide in February 1983. Investigators traced the Mark-Time timer and the Tovex 200 used in the bombings to Kimberlin, and he was placed under surveillance. The police believed that Kimberlin had conducted the Speedway bombings to divert attention from the murder investigation.

On September 20, 1978, Kimberlin was arrested by the FBI for entirely different charges—possession and illegal use of Department of Defense insignia, illegal use of the seal of the president of the United States, and impersonation of a federal officer, after the FBI received a tip from a print shop owner. Between one and two weeks later, he was released although the charges were not dismissed. A few months later, on February 16, 1979, Kimberlin was at a makeshift airport in Texas to supervise the unloading of an airplane when bad weather and low fuel led the airplane's crew to jettison a shipment of 10,000 pounds of marijuana from Colombia (in 50-pound bales) over a wide area of southeastern Texas so the plane could land at a real airport. Kimberlin was arrested a few hours later while trying to retrieve the bales.

In June 1980, Kimberlin was convicted in a Texas federal court of conspiracy to possess marijuana with intent to distribute and was given a four-year sentence. In a separate trial in November 1980, he was convicted of possession and illegal use of Department of Defense insignia, illegal use of the seal of the president of the United States, and impersonation of a federal officer. Finally, Kimberlin was convicted of the Speedway bombings in a trial that took 53 days and included 118 witnesses, and his sentences for all of his convictions were aggregated to a total sentence of 50 years. Kimberlin was released on parole in February 1994 after serving 13 years, but his parole was revoked in 1997 "for submitting a fraudulent mortgage loan application and for failure to pay a civil judgment to victims of the bombings", and he was returned to prison for four more years before his release in 2001. Kimberlin appealed his convictions in 2021, alleging the misuse of microscopic hair evidence, the loss of biological evidence, and jury tampering by the government. The Seventh Circuit rejected his appeal in 2022.

== Dan Quayle marijuana allegations ==
In November 1988, while Kimberlin was in federal prison, National Public Radio reporter Nina Totenberg reported that Kimberlin claimed to have sold marijuana to Republican vice presidential candidate Dan Quayle while Quayle was in law school in Indianapolis. Kimberlin was put in administrative detention on three occasions when he had planned to hold press conferences regarding his claims, leaving him unable to speak to reporters until the week after the election. Kimberlin's claims received renewed attention prior to the 1992 election, when Quayle was running for re-election. During this time, Kimberlin proclaimed his innocence with regard to the Speedway bombings and blamed his late younger brother, Scott, for the presence of the evidence that linked him to them.

After Kimberlin's parole the next year, he signed a contract with New Yorker staff writer Mark Singer, who had written a positive profile of Kimberlin in 1992, to publish a book about his claims regarding both his conviction and his relationship with Quayle. However, Singer "decided that [he] had been lied to repeatedly by Kimberlin." Singer concluded that Kimberlin “was not telling the truth about Quayle.” In print, Singer said he believed Kimberlin had known someone who had claimed to sell marijuana to Quayle and had then appropriated the story as his own.

== Political activism and nonprofit work ==
While in prison, Kimberlin became known as an "exceptionally adroit jailhouse lawyer." He became involved in the cause of an emigre from the former Soviet Union who was convicted of heroin possession and trapped in INS detention limbo since he could not be released in the U.S. and also could not be returned to Russia because of his drug conviction.

Following Kimberlin's release from prison, he attracted attention with an offer to pay $100,000 (later $500,000) to anyone with evidence that the 2004 United States presidential election had been "stolen" by George W. Bush. Kimberlin also achieved some national prominence as an opponent of direct-recording electronic voting machines, including theories related to rigging elections by using them.

According to Time magazine, he leveraged this public attention to organize both the "Velvet Revolution" activist site and the "Justice Through Music Project" nonprofit organization. He has given interviews discussing "music activism" on behalf of the Justice Through Music Project to groups such as Public Radio Exchange. The Justice Through Music Project also has posted music videos opposing torture by the United States and opposing referendum efforts to ban same-sex marriage.

== Litigation ==
Kimberlin, the son of a lawyer, has been involved in extensive litigation over the years. By 1992, he had already filed over 100 motions and lawsuits in federal courts on his own behalf, including a lawsuit against Senator Orrin Hatch in 1999. The case against Hatch was dismissed by the federal district court in the District of Columbia.

=== Blog About Brett Kimberlin Day ===
In March 2012, writer Lee Stranahan announced “Everybody Blog about Brett Kimberlin Day.

In May 2012 Slate reported that conservative bloggers were criticizing Kimberlin in an event called "Blog About Brett Kimberlin Day," apparently based on litigation brought by Kimberlin against the bloggers. Two bloggers who had written about Kimberlin said they were the victim of swatting, hoaxes that brought armed police officers to their homes. Kimberlin denied any connection to the incidents.

On June 6, 2012, Senator Saxby Chambliss sent a letter to Attorney General Eric Holder requesting an investigation of the swatting cases. Kimberlin repeated his denial of any involvement in the hoax calls.
