= 1963 Army–Navy Game =

Army Cadets	Navy Midshipmen
(7–2)	(8–1)
Independent	Independent
15	21
Head coach: Paul Dietzel	Head coach: Wayne Hardin
	AP / Coaches; 2 / 2
	1	2	3	4	Total
Army	7	0	8	0	15
Navy	0	7	7	7	21
- Date: December 7, 1963
- Season: 1963
- Stadium: Philadelphia Municipal Stadium
- Location: Philadelphia, Pennsylvania
- Attendance: 102,000

United States TV coverage
- Network: CBS
- Announcers: Lindsey Nelson

The 1963 Army—Navy Game was held December 7, 1963, at Philadelphia Municipal Stadium. The game was delayed a week from its originally-scheduled date, owing to the assassination of John F. Kennedy. The mood of ceremony surrounding the game was impacted by national mourning of the slain president, and there had initially been uncertainty as to whether the game would be held at all in 1963 due to the official mourning period.

102,000 spectators attended the game, which has often been cited as one of the most memorable matches played in the history of the Army-Navy Game. The CBS television broadcast of the game saw the first-ever use of an instant replay.

== Logistics ==
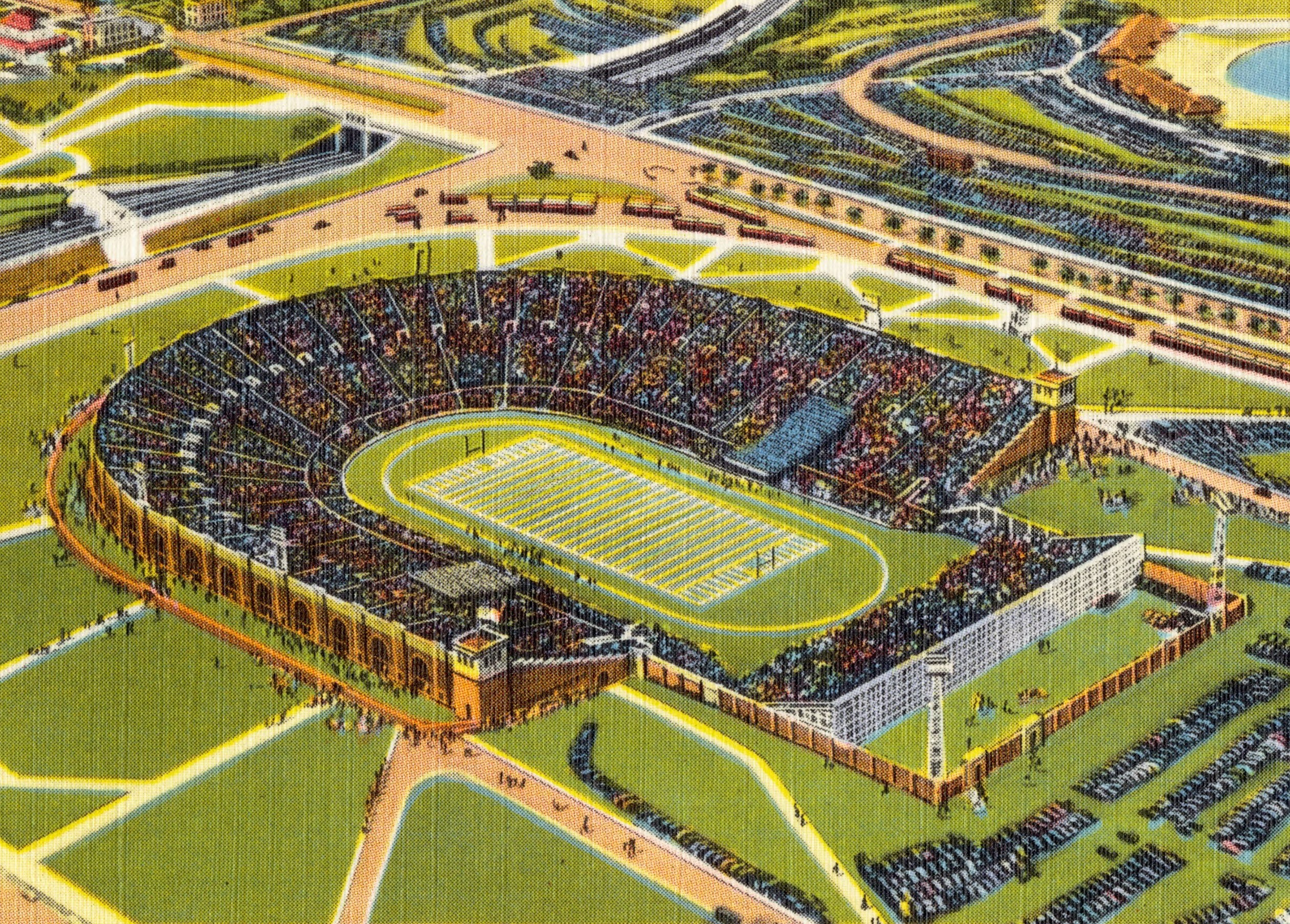
Postcard illustration of Philadelphia Municipal Stadium, the venue of the game

The game was the 64th iteration of the annual Army–Navy Game, a rivalry college football game between the Army Black Knights and the Navy Midshipmen. It was played in Philadelphia at Philadelphia Municipal Stadium on December 7, 1963. The game was attended by 102,000 spectators.

=== 1963 season ===
Navy entered the game as the second-ranked team in the nation, holding a record of 8–1. The 1963 Army season was its second under coach Paul Dietzel, and Army was hoping to end a four-year losing streak against Navy in their annual rivalry game. Whichever team won the game was set to face the 1st-ranked Texas Longhorns in the 1964 Cotton Bowl Classic, adding to the stakes of the game.

=== Postponement ===
The game had been postponed one week from its originally-scheduled date, due to the assassination of President John F. Kennedy. There were questions as to whether the game could be held at all, due to the 30-day national mourning period that military tradition dictated should follow the president's death. Reportedly, the president' widow, Jacqueline Kennedy, supported holding the rivalry game. The late president had been an appreciator of the annual game, being an avid Navy football supporter himself.

The postponed date of the game meant it was held the same day that the winner of the Heisman Trophy was announced, with it being awarded to Navy quarterback Roger Staubach. The announcement was made prior to the game.

=== Ceremonies ===
Ceremonies and decor for game were impacted by the ongoing mourning of President Kennedy, with the ceremonies taking a far more somber mood than would be typical of an Army–Navy Game. All flags surrounding the venue were at half-mast. The presidential box at the game was filled with black flowers. The ceremonial coin flip, which Kennedy had previous been the officiant of as president, was performed only with game referees and players. A member of Army's marching band dedicated the game to Kennedy's memory, and a moment of silence was observed for Kennedy.

=== First instant replay ===
The CBS Sports television broadcast of the game marked the debut of the instant replay. The technology was secured and implemented by producer Tony Verna.

After technical hitches with the machinery, the only replay broadcast during the game was a Rollie Stichweh's touchdown for army, which was replayed at the original speed. The use of replay technology had not been promoted prior to the game. In an attempt to advise viewers on its use, immediately before the replay was shown, commentator Lindsey Nelson told viewers "Now folks, don’t be confused. Army has scored only one touchdown. What you are about to see is a replay." However, many viewers did not process this warning and were left befuddled. Seeing Stichweh displayed scoring a touchdown a second time confused many, with CBS receiving many calls from confused viewers unsure whether there was a technical glitch, and whether Army had got the ball back to score a further touchdown. To clarify that it had a replay and not new footage, commentator Lindsey Nelson advised viewers, "Ladies and gentlemen, Army did not score again!"

== Gameplay ==
Both Navy quarterback Staubach and Army quarterback Stichweh put forward strong efforts in the game.

Army took the initial lead, after Stichweh rushed to score a touchdown making the score 7–0 in Army's favor.

In the second and third quarters, Navy made defensive adjustments and brought fullback Pat Donnelly in on offense. Donnelly contributed substantially to Navy's offensive successes in the game. The score was tied after Navy Halfback Pat Donnelly scored a touchdown. With Army's defense having largely limited Staubach throughout much the first half of the game, the game stood at a 7–7 tie at the end of the second quarter.

Army were overtaken in the score after Navy halfback Pat Donnelly scored a further touchdown off a one-yard run.

Four minutes into the fourth quarter, Donnelly managed to score a third touchdown. This touchdown was a 20-yard burst that finished a 91-drive by Navvy. It gave Navy a commanding 21–7 lead over Army, with only 10:32 of time remaining in the fourth quarter.

The final minutes of gameplay were highly eventful, with Army turning around the game's momentum thanks to the efforts of quarterback Stichweh, halfback Ken Waldrop, and fullback Ray Paske. Army took the kickoff and gained 52 yards in nine consecutive running plays. Stichweh then scored a touchdown from the one-yard line, and next scored a two-point conversion himself. This shrunk Navy's lead to 21–15 with 6:19 minutes remaining.

Stichweh next recovered the insides kick for Army at Navy's 49 yard line, and Army retained possession of the ball the remainder of the game. With Army now playing offense, they drove to the Navy four-yard line. On third-and-goal, Stichweh handed the ball off to teammate Ken Waldrop. Several Navy defensive players managed to tackle Waldrop. Navy intentionally ran out the clock, stalling Army at the 2-yard line until time expired, leaving the score at a 21–15 win for Navy.

The expiration of gameplay without another Army touchdown was, in part, due to a controversial referee decision on when to restart the game clock. Army players were under the belief that the game block would not restart until the snap of the ball, and therefore took time after getting back in formation to call out signals. However, the referee had actually restarted the game clock as soon as Army returned to formation. Thus, Stichweh was taken aback when halfway through calling signals, he was interrupted by a referee announcing the expiration of gamete. Army coach Dietzel took issue with the referee's decision, citing a game earlier tht year they had played against Penn State in which a similar scenario had seen game officials leave the clock stopped until the snap. However, game official Barney Finn argued that, per written rules, the clock was properly run due to the previous play not ending with an action that would have necessitated clock stoppage, and therefore the clock was only paused until the referee deemed noise to have receded enough to allow signals to be called.

== Aftermath and legacy ==
Navy's victory qualified them for the Cotton Bowl Classic.

The 1963 game has been remembered as one of the greatest played in the history of the Army–Navy Game, with many sources recalling it to have been the greatest game in the rivalry's history. It has been recalled as playing an important role in the nation's healing from the killing of its president.
