= Instant replay =

Video reproduction of an earlier live occurrence during an event

Instant replay or action replay is a video reproduction of something that recently occurred, both shot and broadcast live.

After being shown live, the video is replayed so viewers can see it again and analyze what just happened.

Sports—such as American football, association football, badminton, cricket, and tennis—allow officiating calls to be overturned after a play review. Instant replay is most commonly used in sports but is also used in other fields of live TV.

While the first near-instant replay system was developed and used in Canada, the first instant replay was developed and deployed in the United States.

Apart from live-action sports, instant replay is also used to cover large pageants or processions involving prominent dignitaries, political debates, legal proceedings (e.g., the O. J. Simpson murder case), royal weddings, high-profile entertainment events, or acts of terrorism in progress.

Instant replay is used because the events are too large to cover from a single camera angle or too fast-moving to capture all the nuance on the first viewing.

In media studies, the timing and length of the replay clips as well as the selection of camera angles, are forms of editorial content that have a large impact on how the audience perceives the events covered.

Because of the origin of television as a broadcast technology, a "channel" of coverage is traditionally a single video feed consumed in the same way by all viewers. In the age of streaming media, live current events can be accessed by the final viewer with multiple streams of the same content playing concurrently in different windows or on various devices, often with direct end-user control over rewinding to a past moment, as well as an ability to select accelerated, slow-motion or stop-action replay speed.

== History ==
During a 1955 Hockey Night in Canada broadcast on CBC Television, producer George Retzlaff used a "wet-film" (kinescope) replay, which aired several minutes later. Videotape was introduced in 1956 with the Ampex Quadruplex system. However, it could not display slow motion, instant replay, or freeze-frames, and it wasn't easy to rewind and set index points.

The end of the March 24, 1962, boxing match between Benny Paret and Emile Griffith was reviewed a few minutes after the bout ended, in slow motion, by Griffith and commentator Don Dunphy. In hindsight, this has been cited as the first known use of slow-motion replay in television history.

CBS Sports Director Tony Verna invented a system to enable the standard videotape machine to instantly replay on December 7, 1963, for the network's coverage of the US military's Army–Navy Game. The instant replay machine weighed 1,200 pounds (540 kg). After technical hitches, the only replay broadcast was Rollie Stichweh's touchdown. It was replayed at the original speed, with commentator Lindsey Nelson advising viewers, "Ladies and gentlemen, Army did not score again!" The problem with older technology was finding the desired starting point; Verna's system activated audio tones as the exciting events unfolded, which technicians could hear during the rewinding process.

CBS tried out the replay from analog disk storage in 1965, and the Ampex HS-100, which had a 30-second capacity and freeze frame capability, was commercialized in 1967.

Instant replay has been credited as a primary factor in the rise of televised American football, although it was popular on television even before then. In contrast, one camera was set up to show the overall "live" action; other cameras, linked to a separate videotape machine, framed close-ups of key players. Within a few seconds of a crucial play, the videotape machine would replay the action from various close-up angles in slow motion.

Before instant replay, it was almost impossible to portray the essence of an American football game on television. Viewers struggled to assimilate the action from a wide shot of the field on a small black-and-white television screen. However, as Erik Barnouw says in his book Tube of Plenty: The Evolution of American Television," With replay technology, brutal collisions became ballets, and end runs and forward passes became miracles of human coordination." Thanks largely to instant replay, televised football became evening entertainment. ABC-TV's Monday Night Football perfected it and was enjoyed by a wide audience.

Marshall McLuhan, the noted communication theorist, famously said that any new medium contains all prior media. McLuhan gave Tony Verna's invention of instant replay as a good example. "Until the advent of the instant replay, televised football had served simply as a substitute for physically attending the game; the advent of instant replay – which is possible only with the television – marks a post-convergent moment in the medium of television."

== In sports production for television ==
During the live television transmission of sports events, instant replay is often used to show again a passage of play that was especially important or remarkable, or that was unclear at first viewing.

Replays are typically shown during a break or lull in the action; in modern broadcasts, it will be at the next break in play, although older systems were sometimes less instant. The replay may be slow-motion or feature shots from multiple camera angles.

With their advanced technology, video servers, have allowed for more complex replays, such as freeze frame, frame-by-frame review, replay at variable speeds, overlaying of virtual graphics, and instant analysis tools such as ball speed or immediate distance calculation. Sports commentators analyze the replay footage when it is being played rather than describing the concurrent live action.

Instant replays are used today in broadcasting extreme sports, where the speed of the action is too high to be easily interpreted by the naked eye. They use combinations of advanced technologies such as video servers and high-speed cameras recording at up to several thousand frames per second.

Sports production facilities often dedicate one or more cameras to cover star players or key players likely to make a big play in a specific context (e.g., on last down and long in North American football, production crews will often isolate a wide receiver with sure hands in a crowd and/or superior foot speed). These cameras are sometimes called isolation, isolated, or iso-cams for short.

== Production equipment ==
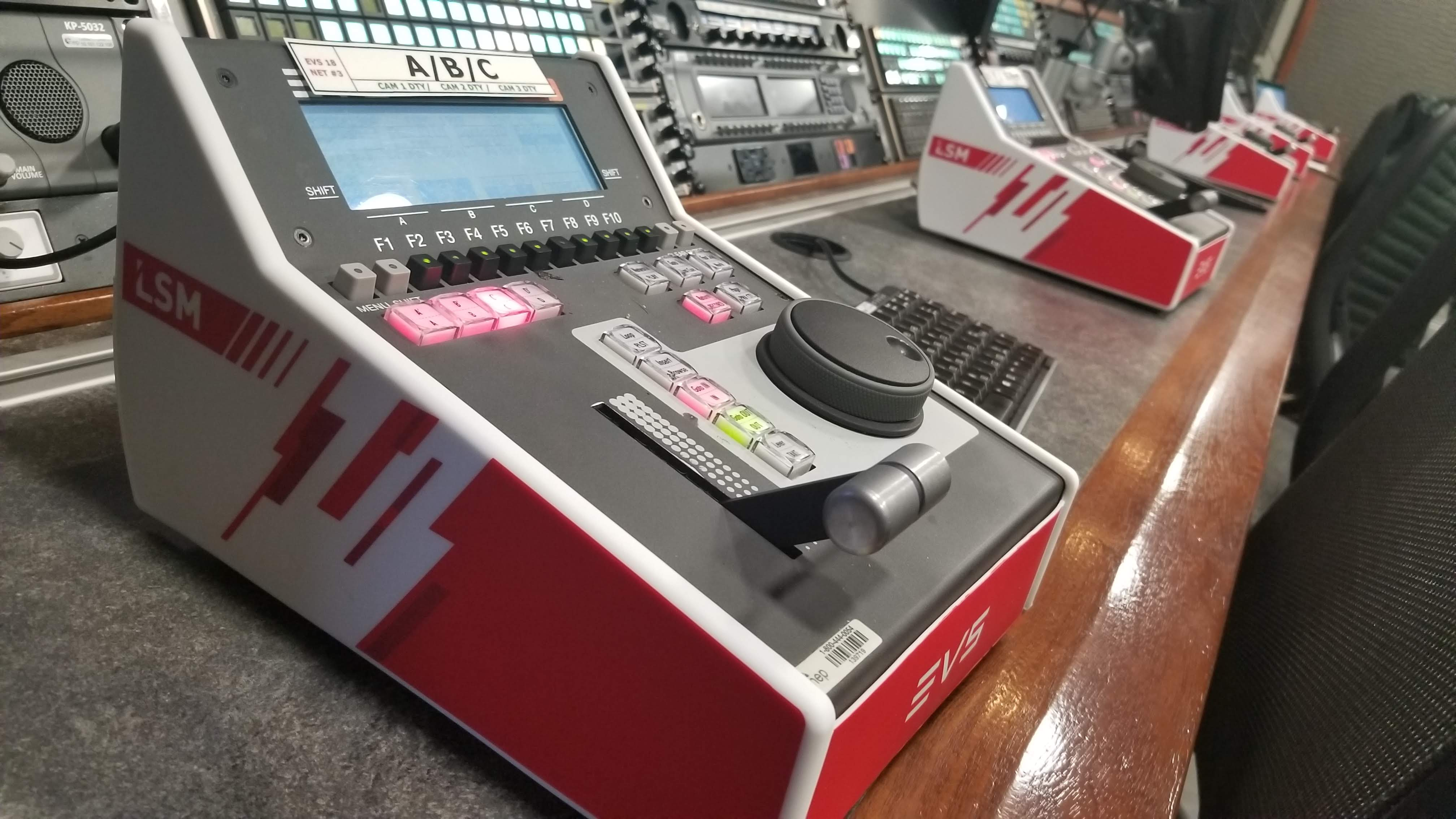
EVS LSM remotes in an OB Production Truck

EVS Broadcast Equipment is a leading manufacturer of replay production servers used by major broadcasters for large events such as the FIFA World Cup, Olympics, Super Bowl, MLB Playoffs, and NBA Playoffs. A 2019 Sports Video Group survey revealed that 213 of 257 HD mobile production trucks were using some form of EVS replay gear.

Evertz Microsystems' DreamCatcher replay system is also widely used by college and pro sports clubs, including teams in the NBA, MLB, and NHL.

== Use by officials ==
Some sports organizations allow referees or other officials to consult replay footage before making or revising a decision about an unclear or dubious play; this is variously called video-assisted referee (VAR), video referee, video umpire, instant replay official, television match official, third umpire, or challenge. Other organizations allow video evidence only after the end of the contest, for example, to penalize a player for misconduct or fouls not noticed by the officials during play.

The role of the video referee differs; often, they can only be called upon to adjudicate on specific events. When instant replay does not provide conclusive proof, rules may say whether the original call stands or whether a particular call must be done (most usually no score).

Leagues using instant replay in official decision-making include the National Hockey League, National Football League, Canadian Football League, Major League Soccer, National Women's Soccer League, National Basketball Association, Women's National Basketball Association, and Major League Baseball. It is also used internationally in field hockey and rugby union. Since 2017, some association football competitions have employed a "Video Assistant Referee" (aka "VAR").

Due to the cost of television cameras and other equipment needed for a video referee to function, most sports only employ them in professional or top-class level play.

=== Baseball ===
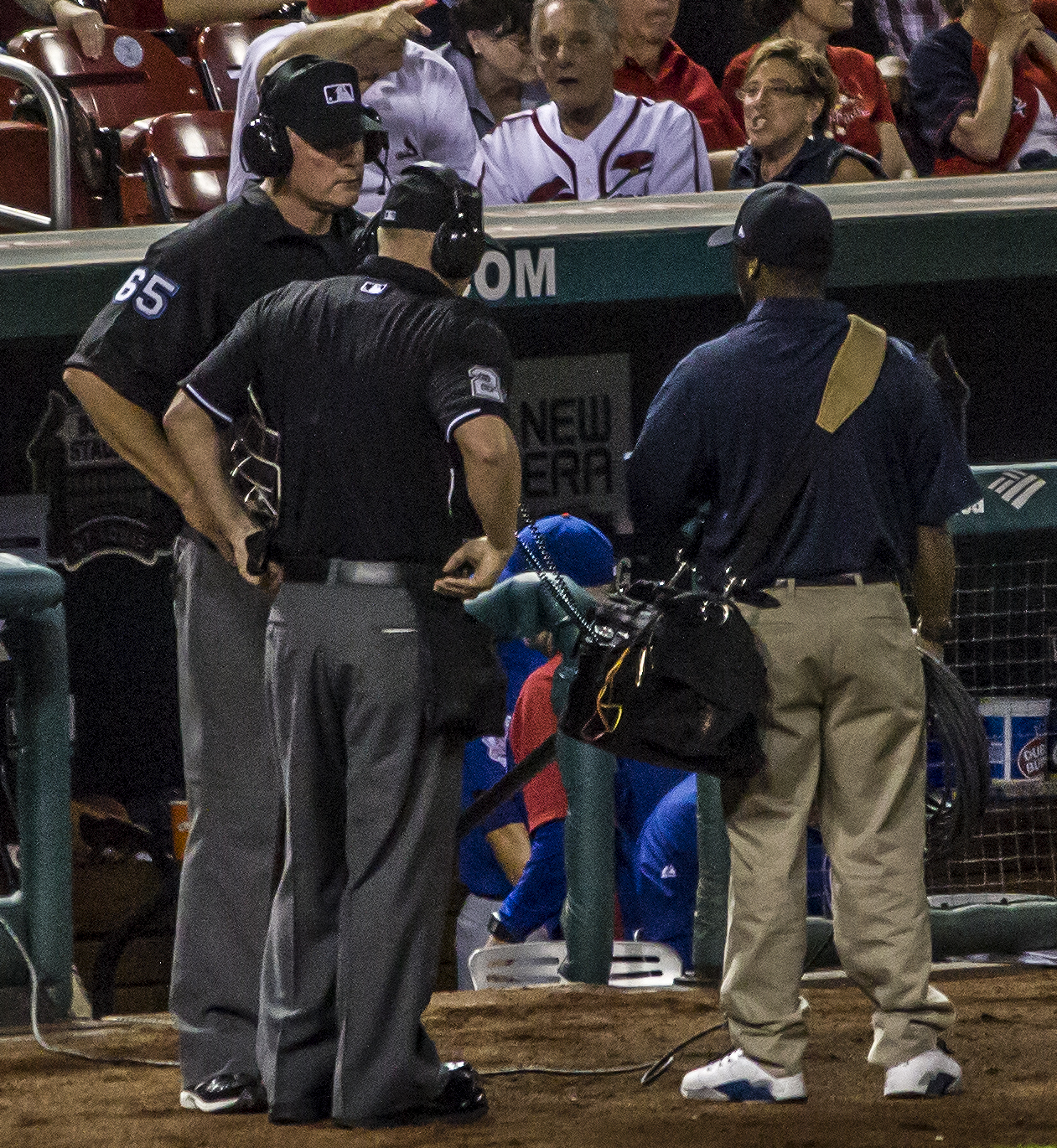
Umpires in St.Louis await the ruling.

In Major League Baseball, instant replay has been introduced to address "boundary calls," which including questions on whether a hit should be considered a home run (HR). Among reviewable plays are Fair Ball-HR, Foul Ball, Ball Clearing Wall-HR, Ball Staying in Play-Live Ball, Ball Leaving Field of Play-HR, and Ball or Player interfered with by spectators (called Spectator Interference). The latest MLB collective bargaining agreement expands instant replay to include Fair Ball Foul Ball along foul lines or Ball Caught for Out Ball Trapped Against Ground or Wall. It expands interference calls to all walls regardless of whether they are "boundary calls" or not.

In Little League Baseball, instant replay was initially adopted for the Little League World Series only but later expanded to include the qualifying regional tournaments. It consists of all "boundary call" plays reviewable at the Major League Level and adding review to plays involving force outs, tag plays on the base paths, hit batters, and defensive appeals regarding whether a runner missed touching a base.

=== Basketball ===
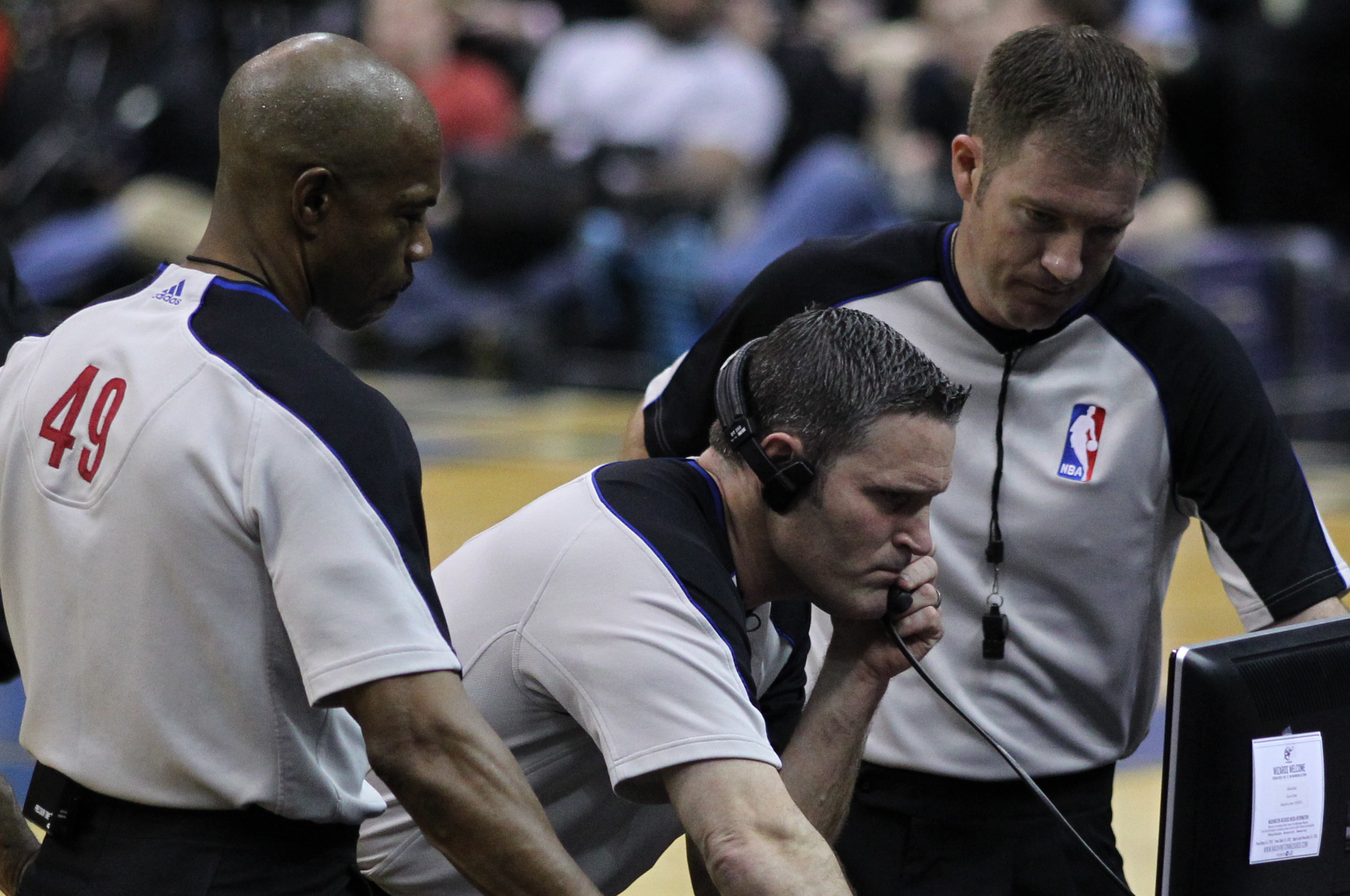
NBA referees reviewing a play

In NBA basketball, the officials must watch an instant replay of a potential buzzer beater to determine if the shot was released before time expired. Since 2002, the NBA has mandated the installation of LED light strips on both the backboard and the scorer's table that illuminate when time expires, to assist with any potential review.

Instant replay first came to the NBA in the 2002–03 season. In Game 4 of the 2002 Western Conference Finals, Los Angeles Lakers forward Samaki Walker made a three-point field goal from half-court at the end of the second quarter. However, the replay showed that Walker's shot was late and the ball was still in his hand when the clock expired. The use of instant replay was instituted afterward.

Beginning with the 2007–08 season, replay can also determine players being ejected from contests involving brawls or flagrant fouls. In the 2008–09 season, replay may also be used to correctly determine whether a scored field goal is worth two or three points. It may also choose the correct number of free throws awarded for a missed field goal. It may also be used in cases where the game clock malfunctions and play continues to decide how much time to take off the clock. In 2014, the NBA consolidated its replay work in a remote instant replay center to support officials in multiple games.

In college basketball, the same procedure may also be used to determine if a shot was released before time expired in either half or an overtime period. In addition, NCAA rules allow the officials to use instant replay to determine if a field goal is worth two or three points, which is to take a free throw, whether a fight occurred, and who participated in a fight. The officials may also check if the shot was made before the expiration of the shot clock, but only when such a situation occurs at the end of a half or an overtime period. Such rules have required the NCAA to write new rules stating that, when looking at instant replay video, the zeros on the clock, not the horn or red light, determine the end of the game.

In Italy, host broadcaster Sky agreed with Serie A to adopt instant replay for special tournaments and playoff games, and in 2005, for the entire season. Instant replay would be used automatically in situations similar to the NCAA, but coaches may, like the NFL, have one coach's challenge to challenge a two or three-point shot. Officials may determine who last touched the ball in out-of-bounds or back-court violations.

The adoption of instant replay was crucial in the 2005 Serie A championship between Armani Jeans Milano and Climamio Bologna. Bologna led the best-of-five series, 2–1, with Game 4 in Milan and the home team leading 65–64, as Climamio's Ruben Douglas connected on a three-point basket at the end of the game to win the Serie A championship.

Knowing the 12,000 fans on both sides, officials would learn the series' fate on their call and watch replays of the shot before determining whether it was valid.

The EuroLeague Basketball (company) adopted instant replay for the 2006 EuroLeague Final Four. It changed the rule that the lights on the backboard, not the horn, will end a period, thus assisting with instant replay.

On April 6, 2006, FIBA announced instant replay for last-second shots would be legal for their competitions.

"The referee may use technical equipment to determine whether the ball has or has not left the player's hand(s) within the playing time on a last shot made at the end of each period or extra period."

2019, FIBA updated its IRS (Instant Replay System) manual further to summarize the accepted workflows and methods for video review.

Before the beginning of the 2013-2014 NBA season, new instant replay rules were put into effect. They say that instant replay can be used for block/charge plays to determine if an off-ball foul occurred before or after a shooting motion began in a successful shot attempt or if the ball is released on a throw-in. They also began to use instant replay to determine correct penalties for flagrant fouls.

=== Cricket ===
Cricket also uses an instant replay. It is used for run-outs, stumpings, doubtful catches, and whether the ball has crossed the boundary for a six or short of a four.

The International Cricket Council decided to trial a referral system during the Indian tour of Sri Lanka through late July and August 2008. This new referral system allows players to seek reviews, by the third umpire, of decisions by the on-field umpires on whether or not a batsman has been dismissed. Each team can make two unsuccessful requests per inning, which must be made within a few seconds of the ball becoming dead; once made, the requests cannot be withdrawn. Only the batsman involved in a dismissal can ask for a review of an "out" decision; in a "not out", only the captain or acting captain of the fielding team. Players can consult on-field teammates in both cases, but signals from off the field are not permitted.

The player with a 'T' sign can make a review request; the umpire will consult the TV umpire, who will review TV coverage of the incident before relaying back fact-based information. The field umpire can either reverse his decision or stand by it; he indicates "out" with a raised finger and "not out" by crossing his hands horizontally from side to side in front and above his waist three times.

The TV umpire can use regular slow-motion or high-speed camera angles (usually called ultra-motion) or super-slow replays, the mat, sound from the stump mics, and approved ball tracking technology, which refers to Hawk-Eye technology that would only show the TV umpire where the ball pitched and where it hit the batsman's leg and it is not to be used for predicting the height or the direction of the ball. Snicko and Hot Spot can also be used.

=== Fencing ===
Video refereeing is compulsory at World Championships, Grand Prix competitions, and the Olympic Games and is used when the referee cannot decide if a touch is to be awarded at the request of a player (although only two incorrect video appeals are allowed per player in individual competitions) or if the score is tied in the last point and both lights turn on. An assistant official, a "video referee," watches the live match and helps the referee decide through a slow-motion replay on a monitor close to the piste. It is used to determine the right of way in foil and sabre. A player must gesture as a rectangle (monitor) to the referee to appeal. In individual matches, if the player has appealed twice incorrectly, they can no longer appeal again.

=== Association football ===
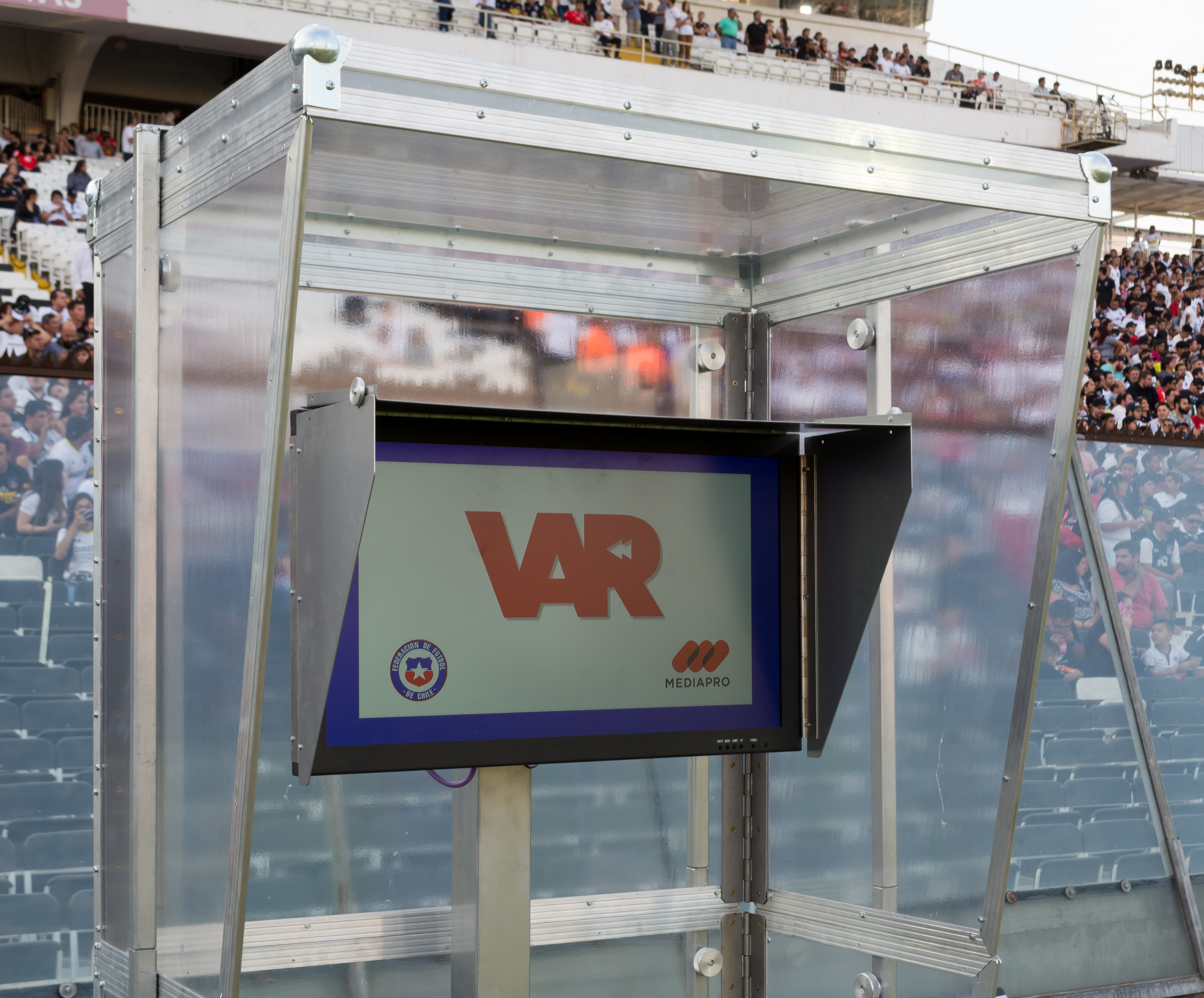
VAR monitor at the Estadio Monumental David Arellano

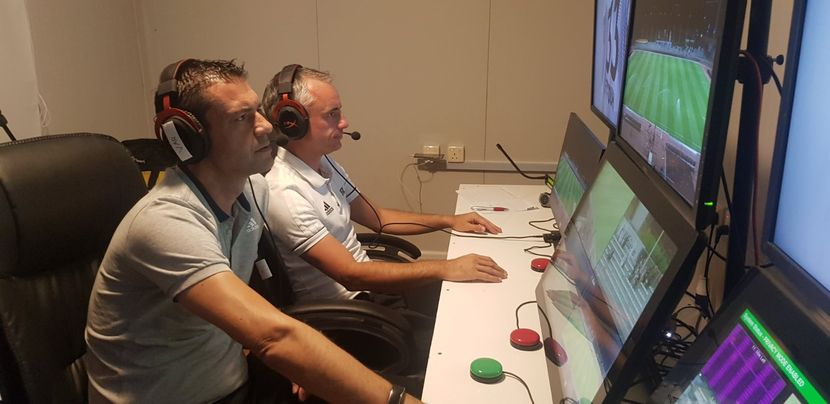
Assistant video assistant referees in action during a Saudi Professional League match

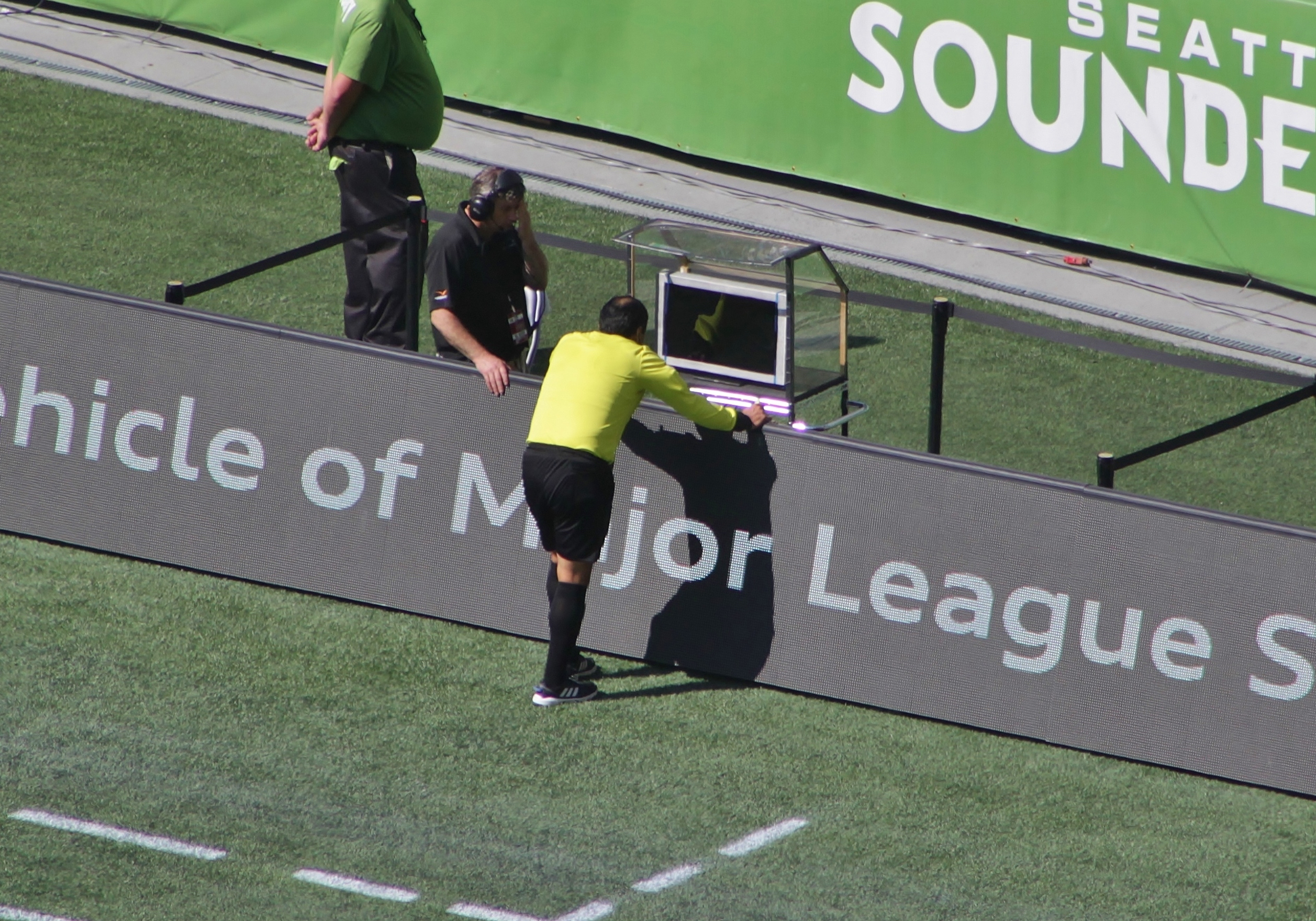
A Major League Soccer referee reviewing a play using a sideline monitor

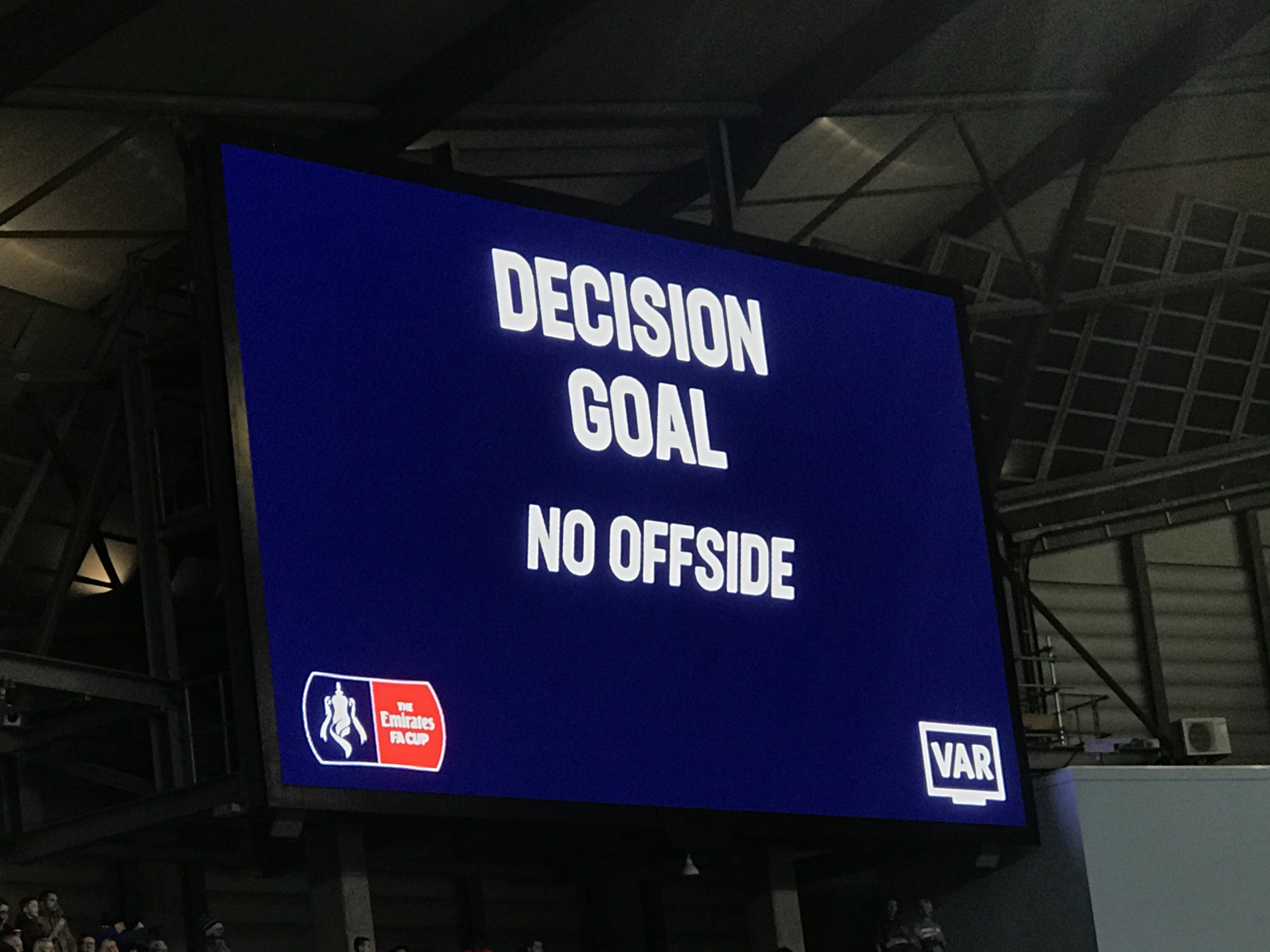
A VAR decision during an FA Cup match at the Etihad Stadium, Manchester

In association football, FIFA did not formally permit video evidence during matches until the 2018 FIFA World Cup, although it had been on trial in various competitions beforehand, and it was permitted for subsequent disciplinary sanctions. The 1970 meeting of the International Football Association Board "agreed to request the television authorities to refrain from any slow-motion play-back which reflected, or might reflect, adversely on any decision of the referee". In 2005, Urs Linsi, general secretary of FIFA, said:

Players, coaches and referees all make mistakes. It's part of the game. It's what I would call the "first match". What you see after the fact on video simply doesn't come into it; that's the "second match", if you like. Video evidence is useful for disciplinary sanctions, but that's all. As we've always emphazised at FIFA, football's human element must be retained. It mirrors life itself and we have to protect it.

There have been allegations that referees had made or changed decisions on the advice of a fourth official who had seen the in-stadium replay of an incident. This was denied by FIFA in relation to the Zidane headbutt of Materazzi in the 2006 World Cup final, and in relation to the 2009 FIFA Confederations Cup match between Brazil and Egypt, in which Howard Webb signaled initially for a corner kick but then a penalty kick.

It has been said that instant replay is needed given the difficulty of tracking the activities of 22 players on such a large field, FIFA officials approached researchers at the University of Glasgow in Scotland for help, but came up with nothing that could satisfy the league's stringent requirements. Opponents of instant replay like former FIFA President Sepp Blatter argue that refereeing mistakes add to the "fascination and popularity of football." It has been proposed that instant replay be limited to use in penalty incidents, fouls which lead to bookings or red cards and whether the ball has crossed the goal line, since those events are more likely than others to be game-changing.

In 2007, FIFA authorized tests of two systems, one involving an implanted chip in the ball and the other using a modified version of Tennis's Hawk-Eye system, to assist referees in deciding whether a ball had crossed over the goal line. The following year, however, the IFAB and FIFA halted testing of all goal-line technology, fearing that its success would lead to its possible expansion to other parts of the game. Sepp Blatter claimed the technologies were flawed and too expensive to be implemented on a widespread basis, adding, "Let it be as it is and let's leave (soccer) with errors. The television companies will have the right to say (the referee) was right or wrong, but still the referee makes the decision — a man, not a machine". This sudden change of course surprised and angered Paul Hawkins, as the inventor of the Hawk-Eye system had invested a great deal of money into adapting the Hawk-Eye technology to football. In 2009, Hawkins sent an open letter to Blatter refuting the FIFA president's assertion that the Hawk-Eye goal line technology was flawed and arguing that Hawk-Eye met all of the criteria established by the IFAB for a suitable goal line technology system.

The controversy over goal line technology was re-ignited in 2009 after Brazil had a potential equalizing goal disallowed during the 2009 Confederations Cup Final; and during the 2010 FIFA World Cup after England's Frank Lampard's shot off the underside of the crossbar during a 4–1 defeat against Germany was not ruled a goal, despite replays clearly showing it was 60 centimeters over the line.

In July 2012, International Football Association Board voted unanimously to officially amend the Laws of the Game to permit (but not require) goal-line technology. The technology was used at the 2014 FIFA World Cup.

In April 2016, it was announced that Serie A was selected by the International Football Association Board to test video replays, which were initially private for the 2016–17 season, allowing them to become a live pilot phase, with replay assistance implemented in the 2017–18 season. On the decision, FIGC President Carlo Tavecchio said, "We were among the first supporters of using technology on the pitch and we believe we have everything required to offer our contribution to this important experiment".

In September 2016, the video review system known as Video Assistant Referees (VAR), was first used in an international friendly between Italy and France. The system was implemented at a FIFA World Cup for the first time at the 2018 FIFA World Cup.

Major League Soccer in the United States introduced VAR in competitive matches during its 2017 season after the 2017 MLS All-Star Game on 2 August 2017.

=== Gridiron football codes ===
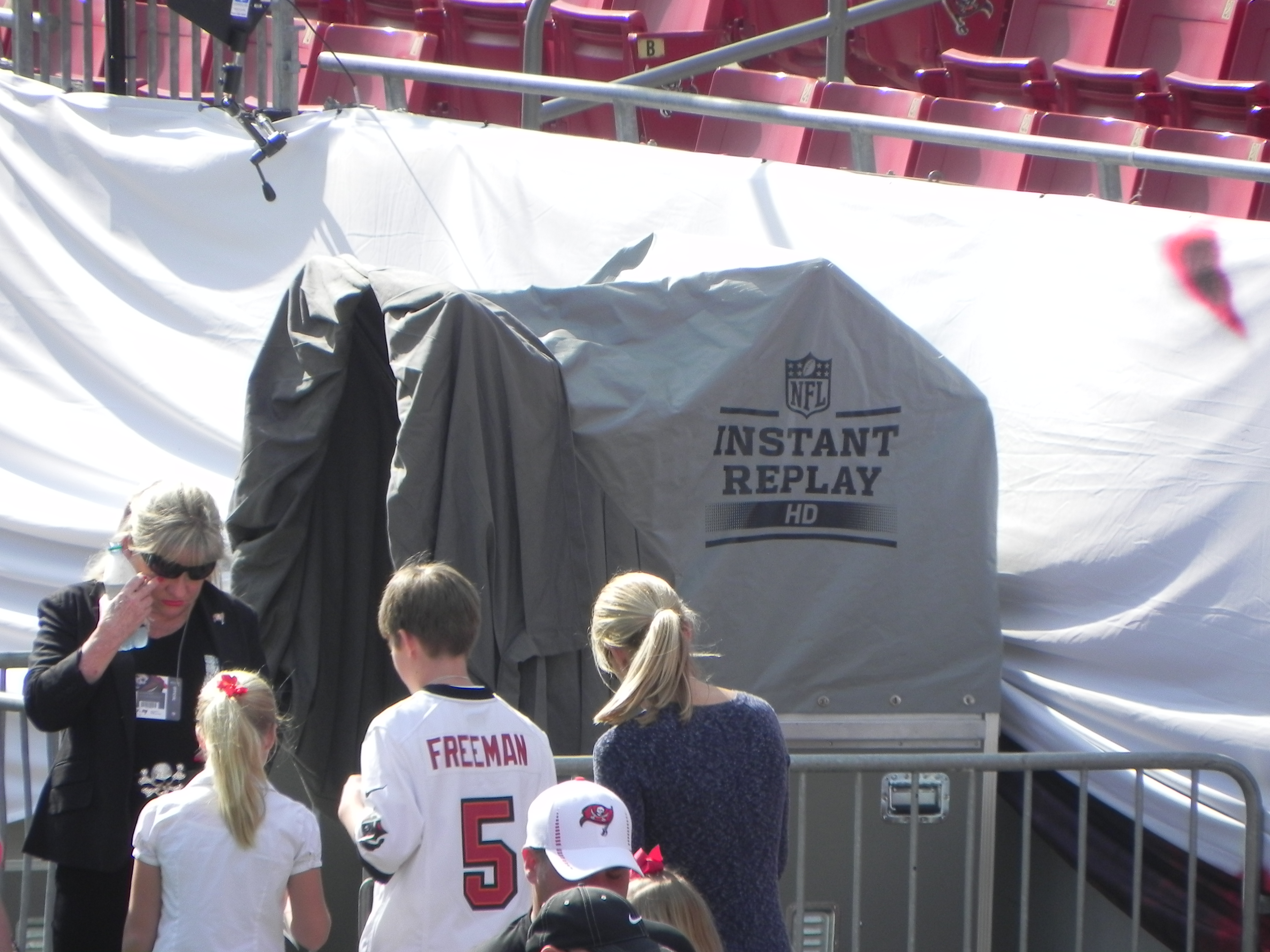
Instant Replay booth at Raymond James Stadium

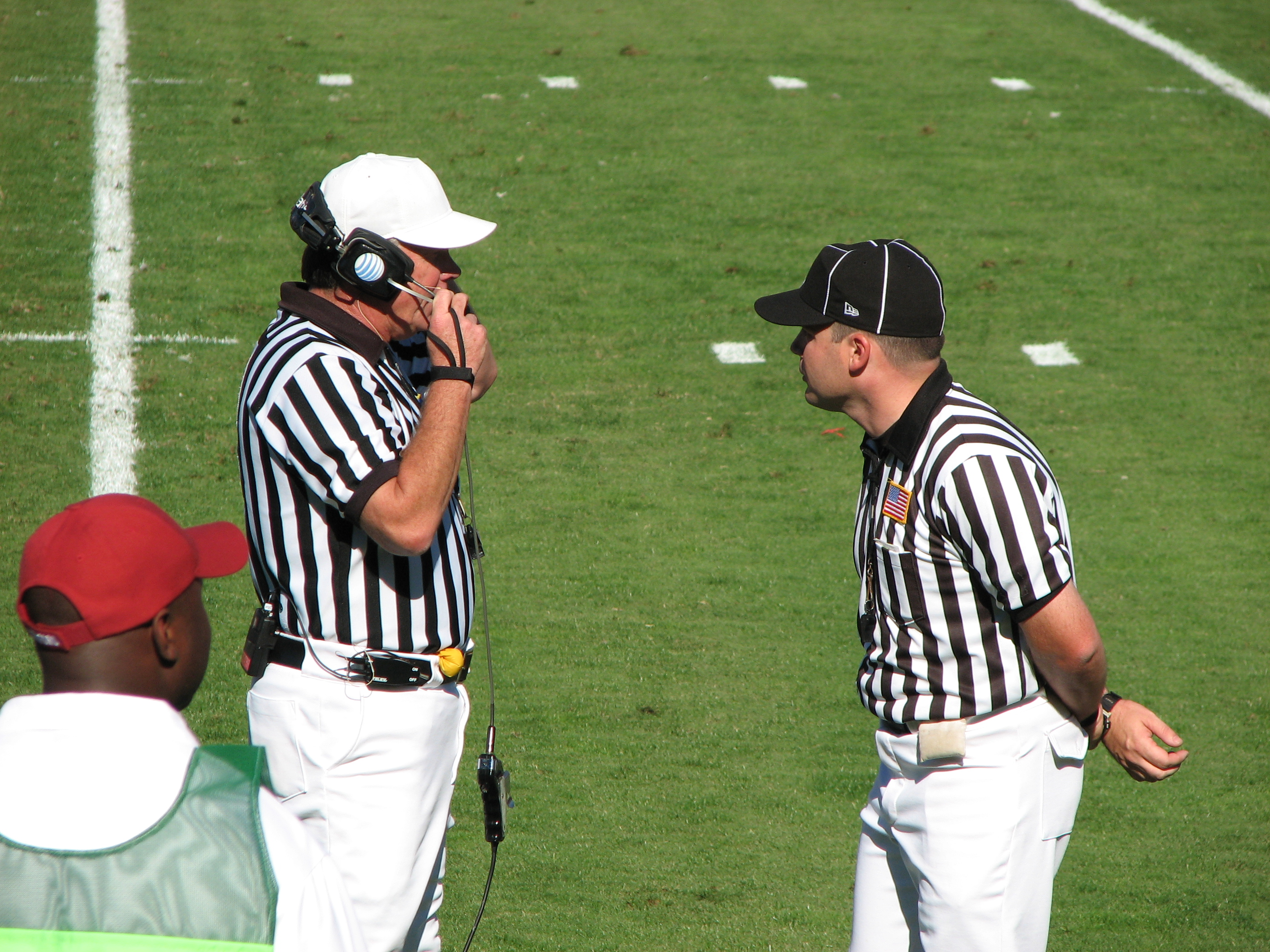
Referee (left) talking with the replay official

In American and Canadian football, instant replay can take place in the event of a close or otherwise controversial call, either at the request of a team's head coach (with limitations) or the officials themselves. There are restrictions on what types of plays can be reviewed. In general, most penalty calls or lack thereof cannot be reviewed, nor can a play that is whistled dead by the officials before the play could come to its rightful end.

American and Canadian football leagues vary in their application and use of instant replay review. In the National Football League, each coach is allowed two opportunities per game to make a coach's challenge, and get a third challenge if both of the original two challenges were successful. A challenge can only be made on certain reviewable calls on plays that begin before the two-minute warning and only when a team has at least one timeout remaining in the half. The Canadian Football League uses similar rules as the NFL, except the game has a three-minute warning near the end of each half instead of two. In NCAA football, each team only has one challenge per game, and gets a second challenge if the first one is successful. In all three rules codes, the challenging team is charged with a timeout if their challenge is unsuccessful.

U.S. high school rules prohibited the use of replay review, even if the venue had equipment that allows the practice, before 2019, when the National Federation of State High School Associations (NFHS) gave its member associations the option to allow its use in postseason games only. In Texas, where high schools have always based their rules on those of the NCAA, the University Interscholastic League, which governs public-school sports, allows its use only in state championship finals. The main governing body for Texas private schools, the Texas Association of Private and Parochial Schools, follows pre-2019 NFHS practice by banning replay review.

=== Field hockey ===
In field hockey, the International Hockey Federation allows the match umpire to request the opinion of a video umpire as to whether or not a goal has been validly scored, and whether there was a violation in the build-up to a goal. The video umpire can advise on whether the ball crossed the line or whether there was a violation. Ordinarily, teams are not allowed to make such a request or to press the match umpire to do so. On a trial basis, the 2009 Men's Champions Trophy allows for "team referral" by each team captain, to query a goal, penalty stroke, or penalty corner decision. The team retains the right to a referral if its previous referrals were upheld.

=== Ice hockey ===
The video goal judge reviews replays of disputed goals. As the referee does not have access to television monitors, the video goal judge's decision in disputed goals is taken as final. In the NHL, goals may only be reviewed in the following situations: puck crossing the goal line completely and before time expired, puck in the net prior to goal frame being dislodged, puck being directed into the net by hand or foot, puck deflected into the net off an official, and puck deflected into the goal by a high stick (stick above the goal) by an attacking player. The video goal judge also reviews replays to establish the correct time on the game clock. All NHL goals and time remaining on the game clock are subject to review, and although most arenas have a video goal judge, often officials in the Situation Room (also known as the "War Room") at the NHL office in Toronto make the final decision.

==== Review challenges ====
Instant replay for disputed goals was introduced in the National Hockey League (NHL) in 1991. In 2015, instant replay reviews were expanded to include a coach's challenge. Each coach is allowed one challenge per game, for which only the goaltender interference challenge requires the use of a timeout. Coaches may challenge if they believe a goal should be disallowed because of goaltender interference, a missed stoppage during play, or an offside, or if they believe that a disallowed goal should be allowed instead. The challenging team retains its timeout and its challenge after every overturned goaltender interference call. There are two situations that happen when a challenge is upheld:

- If an offside review or missed stoppage review is upheld, the challenging team receives a minor penalty for delay of game.
- If a goaltender interference review is upheld, the challenging team loses its timeout.

Initially, teams had to have a timeout to challenge and could only challenge an allowed goal for either a missed offside or goaltender interference and a disallowed goal for goalkeeper interference.

Challenges are not allowed during the final minute of regulation, as well as at any point during overtime. In this situation, officials in the Situation Room reviews all instances where the puck entered the net, and then determines the final ruling. However, for reviews that take place during coach's challenges, the on-ice officials determine the final ruling.

==== Junior Hockey ====
Similar to the National Hockey League, Junior Hockey leagues, such as the CJHL also use instant replay with a Video Goal Judge to initiate and be responsible for the review of all goals. The Video Goal Judge may also be asked to verify the time during a game.

Referees utilize instant replay for on-ice review of Major Penalties as well as Match Penalties, in which they look to confirm or modify their original call on the ice.

Video review on a play involving a goal must be done immediately after the play has concluded, and before the puck is dropped again. On-ice calls cannot be overturned once the puck is dropped again and play has resumed.

=== Motorsports ===
In international motorsport championships, race stewards often use instant replay to decide whether to penalize competitors for avoidable contact or pitlane infractions.

NASCAR utilizes instant replay to supplement their electronic scoring system. Video replays are used to review rules infractions and scoring disputes.

- Video replay supplements electronic scoring at the finish line (particularly the race winner) in "photo finish" situations.
- Video replay supplements electronic scoring to determine the final positions when a race ends under the safety car on either the last lap (both in regulation and in a green-white-checker finish) or when it is evident the race will reach the expiration of time without a subsequent restart.
  - Starting in 2022, if the safety car situation subsequently results in the race being concluded for weather, curfew, other situation, video replay can be used to determine the final positions. Previously, if a race is prematurely ended, the race was determined by the last completed scoring loop. This happened as a result of the October 2021 Talladega Superspeedway Sparks 300 Xfinity Series race that was curtailed because of darkness, where NASCAR determined results based on the last completed scoring loop.
- Video replay is used to determine if a car has crossed the pit entrance before the pit was closed when a safety car situation begins. It also determines if drivers are following pit road speed limits.
- Video replay supplements electronic scoring to determine the positions in which cars exit the pits (during the safety car).

IndyCar also utilizes instant replay for similar reasons.

- The most notable use of replay in recent years occurred during the 2008 Peak 300 at Chicagoland Speedway. On the final lap, Scott Dixon and Hélio Castroneves crossed the finish line side by side, with computer scoring showing Dixon the winner by a margin of 0.0010 seconds. However, video replay evidence clearly showed that the nose of Castroneves' car touched the line first. Castroneves was declared the winner officially by 0.0033 seconds or 12 1/8 inches (310 mm), in the second closest finish in the twelve-year history of the series. It was later determined that the deliberate improper installation of Dixon's scoring transponder was the source of the scoring error.
- Video replay was also used extensively in the aftermath of the controversial 2002 Indianapolis 500. However, fully conclusive evidence was lacking.

Broadcast stations utilize replays to show viewers a crash in greater detail.

=== Rodeo ===
The Professional Bull Riders, beginning with the 2006–07 season, has instituted an instant replay review system.

A bull rider, a fellow competitor, or a judge may request a replay review by filing a protest to the replay official within 30 seconds of any decision.

Any competitor (it does not have to be the rider who is riding the bull in question, as fellow riders can observe the action and spot fouls by bull or rider) may file the complaint to the replay official by sounding a signal at the arena and explaining to the replay official why he is filing the request.

The designated replay official (one of the four officials in the arena) may request different angles and/or slow motion, as well as freeze particular frames. The replay judge will use all available technology to assess the call in question and supply his ruling. This includes using his own hand-held stopwatch to time bull rides in case of a clock malfunction, as well as a graphic overlay of the official eight-second clock used in PBR competition that starts when the bull exits the bucking chute.

The replay will be used to evaluate timing issues, fouls against the rider for touching the bull or ground with his free hand or using the fence to stay on the bull, or fouls by the bull, such as dragging the rider across the fence.

If an appeal is successful, the decision will be overturned and there will be no charge to the individual filing the protest. If the appeal is unsuccessful, a $500 charge is levied against the protester which is donated to PBR charities such as the Western Sports Foundation to assist injured bull riders and western sports athletes.

=== Rugby league ===
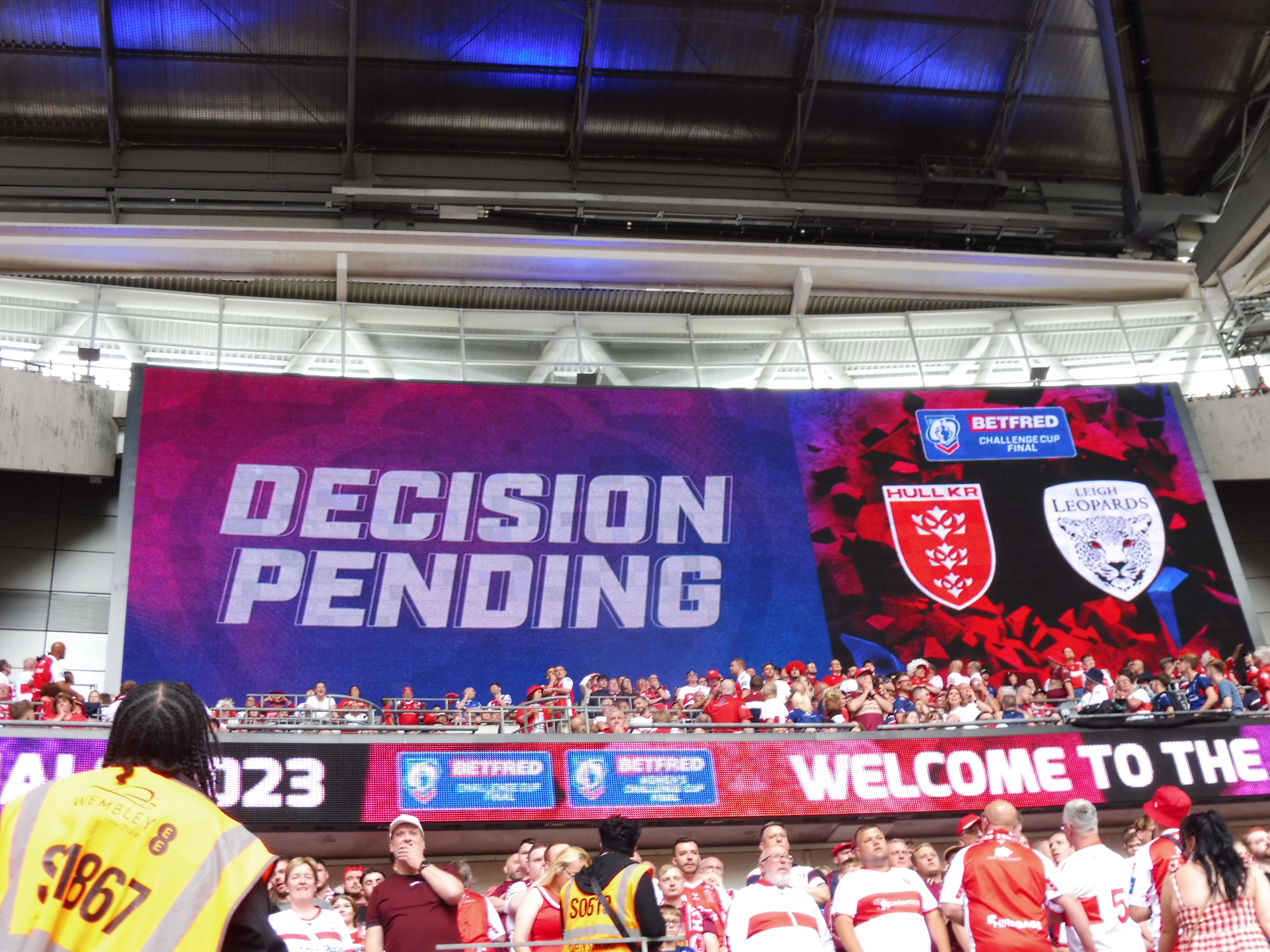
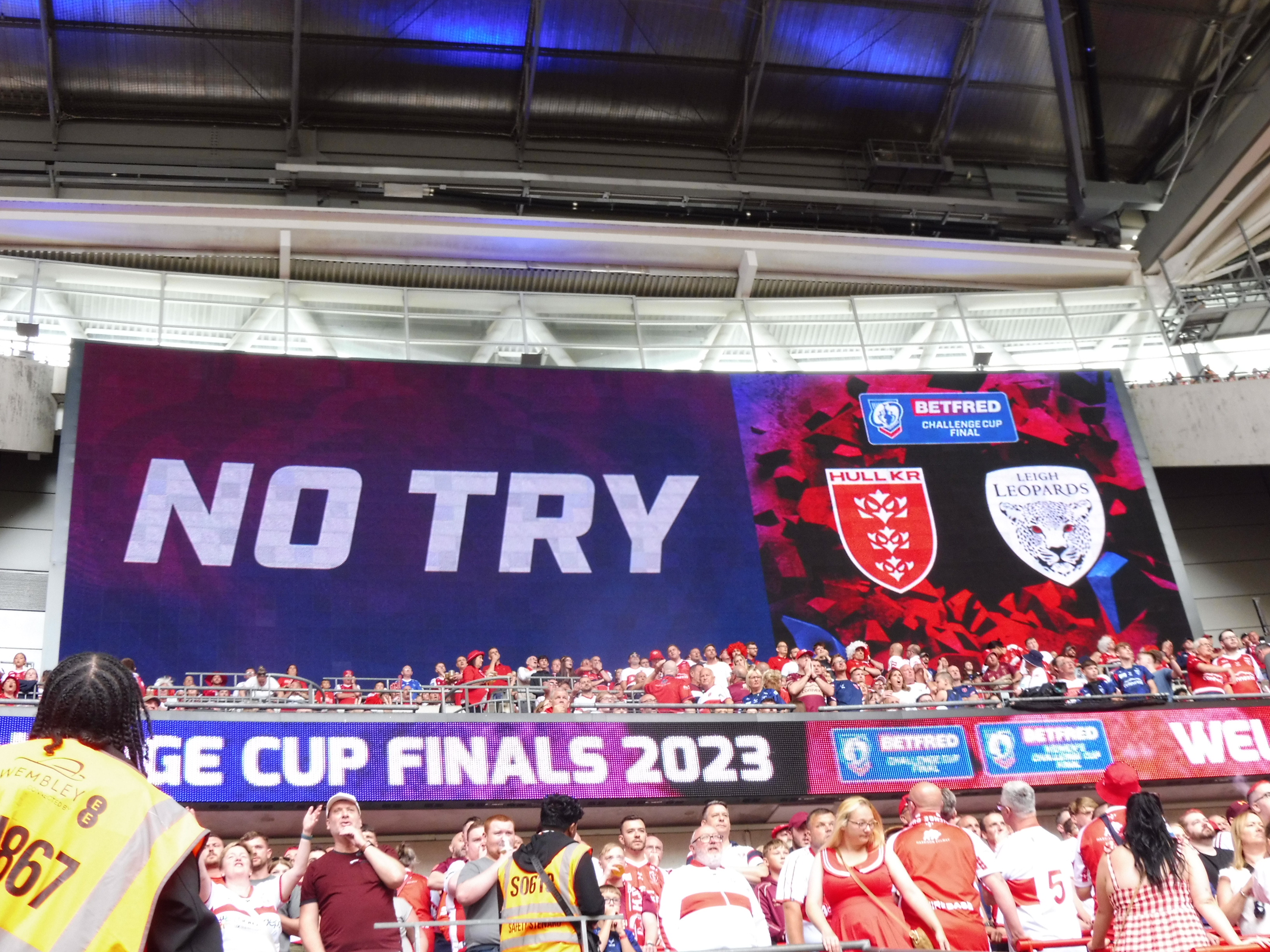
The video referee confirms a "No Try" during the 2023 Challenge Cup final at Wembley Stadium.

Since being introduced by the Super League in 1996, video referees have been adopted in Australasia's National Rugby League and international competition as well. In rugby league the video referee can be called upon by the match official to determine the outcome of a possible try. The "video ref" can make judgements on knock-ons, offside, obstructions, hold-ups and whether or not a player has gone dead, but cannot rule on a forward pass. If a forward pass has gone un-noticed by the on-field officials it must be disregarded by the video ref, as such judgements cannot reliably be made due to camera angle effects.

=== Rugby union ===
Use of video referee by referees was introduced to rugby union in 2001. The laws of the game allow for "an official who uses technological devices" to be consulted by the referee in decisions relating to scoring a try or a kick at goal. The decision to call on the video referee (now called "Television Match Official (TMO)") is made by the referee following discussion with the assistant referees/touch judges and cannot be instigated by the players or coaches of either team. When concerning an act of foul play, the TMO may alert the referee and initiate the replay process.

In a possible try/no try situation, the referee shall signal his initial on-field decision (the "soft signal") and request the TMO to review all available footage and provide "advice and recommendations" to the on field referee. The referee should only change their decision where there is "clear and obvious" evidence that it was incorrect. In stadia with screens, the TMO may show footage directly to the referee. As per Law 6.5 A of the Laws of Rugby Union, "The referee is the sole judge of fact and of law during a match". Once a final decision is made, it is to be signaled by the referee.

=== Tennis ===
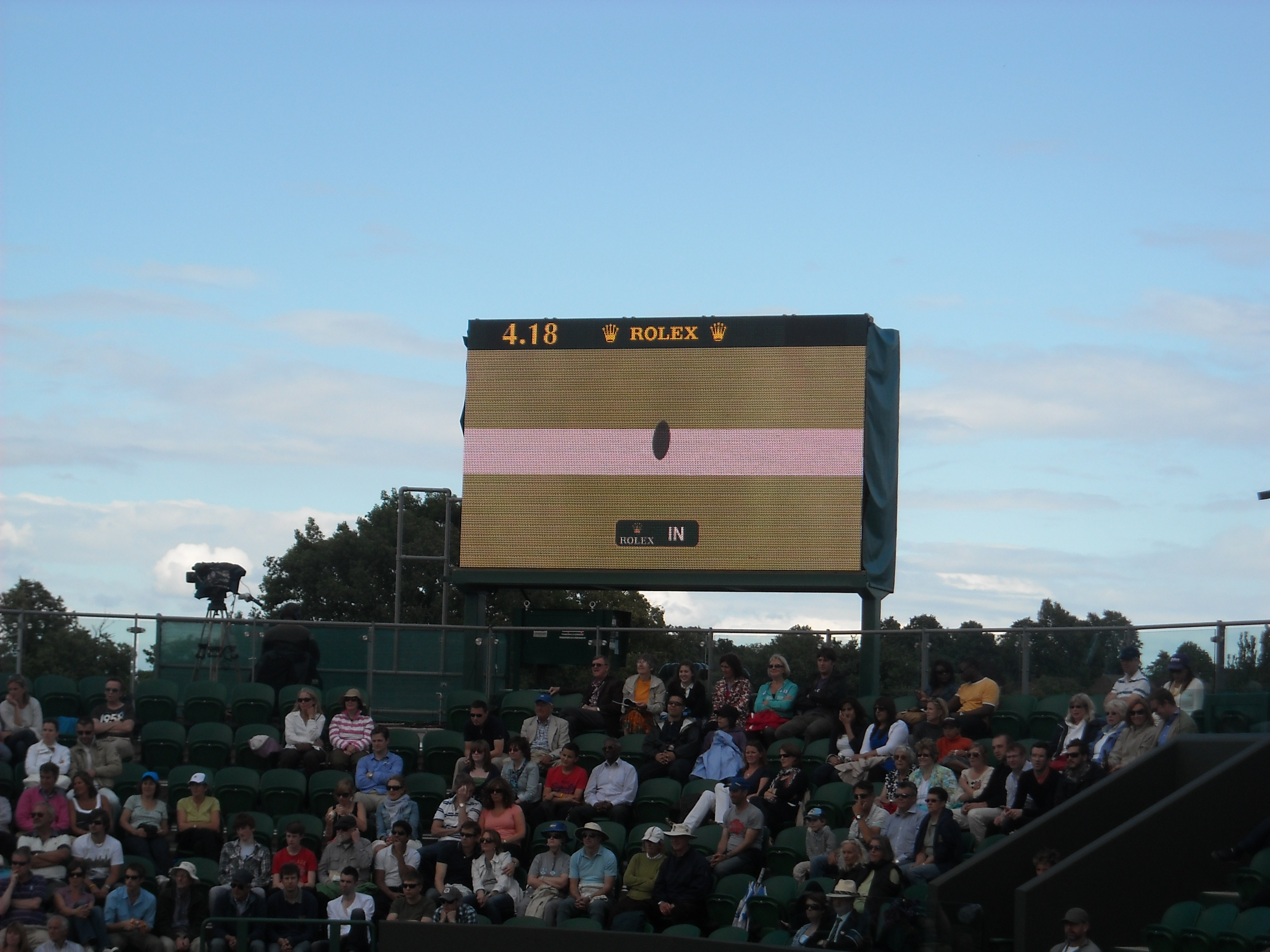
Hawk-Eye in use at Wimbledon

In tennis, systems such as Hawk-Eye and MacCAM calculate the trajectory of the ball by processing the input of several video cameras. They can play a computer rendering of the path and determine whether the ball landed in or out. Players can appeal to have the system's calculation used to override a disputed call by the umpire. In March 2008, the International Tennis Federation, Association of Tennis Professionals, Women's Tennis Association and Grand Slam Committee agreed unified challenge rules: a player can make up to three unsuccessful challenges per set, and a fourth in a tie-break. Television broadcasts may use the footage to replay points even when not challenged by a player.

=== Volleyball ===
In volleyball, the video-assisted refereeing is called the video challenge system which has been in used in FIVB events since 2013 and the Summer Olympics since 2016.

== See also ==
- Photo finish
- Multicam (LSM), remote controller used for instant replays with XT3 servers.
- Scoreboard § Video board animation
