= Army–Navy Game =

Annual American football game between the US Military Academy and the US Naval Academy

- Army Black Knights Navy Midshipmen
- Sport: Football
- First meeting: November 29, 1890; Navy, 24–0
- Latest meeting: December 13, 2025; Navy, 17–16
- Next meeting: December 12, 2026
- Broadcasters: CBS/Paramount+
- Stadiums: M&T Bank Stadium (2025); MetLife Stadium (2026); Lincoln Financial Field (2027)
- Trophy: Secretary's Trophy; Third leg of triangular series for Commander-in-Chief's Trophy

Statistics
- Total meetings: 126
- All-time series: Navy leads, 64–55–7
- Largest victory: Navy, 51–0 (1973)
- Longest win streak: Navy, 14 (2002–2015)
- Current win streak: Navy, 2 (2024–present)

The Army–Navy Game is an annual college football game played by the Army Black Knights of the United States Military Academy in West Point, New York, and the Navy Midshipmen of the United States Naval Academy in Annapolis, Maryland. The Black Knights (or Cadets) and Midshipmen each represent their service's oldest officer commissioning sources. As such, the game has come to embody the spirit of the interservice rivalry of the United States Armed Forces. The game marks the end of the college football regular season and the third and final game of the season's Commander-in-Chief's Trophy series, which also includes the Air Force Falcons of the United States Air Force Academy near Colorado Springs, Colorado. The series has been uninterrupted since 1930. Through the 2025 meeting, Navy leads the series 64–55–7.

Branded as "America's Game," the Army–Navy Game is one of the most traditional and enduring rivalries in college football. It has been frequently attended by the president of the United States. The game has been nationally televised each year since 1945 on either ABC, CBS, or NBC. Since 1996, CBS has televised the game exclusively, and it has the rights to the broadcast through 2038. The December 2024 announcement of CBS Sports' extension will also give their international channels rights in the United Kingdom and Australia. Instant replay made its American debut on CBS in the 1963 Army–Navy game. Since 2009, the game has been held on the second Saturday of December and following FBS conference championship weekend. The game has been primarily played in Philadelphia, but the game has also been held in multiple locations including the New York area, the Baltimore–Washington area, Chicago, Pasadena, and the Boston area.

== History ==
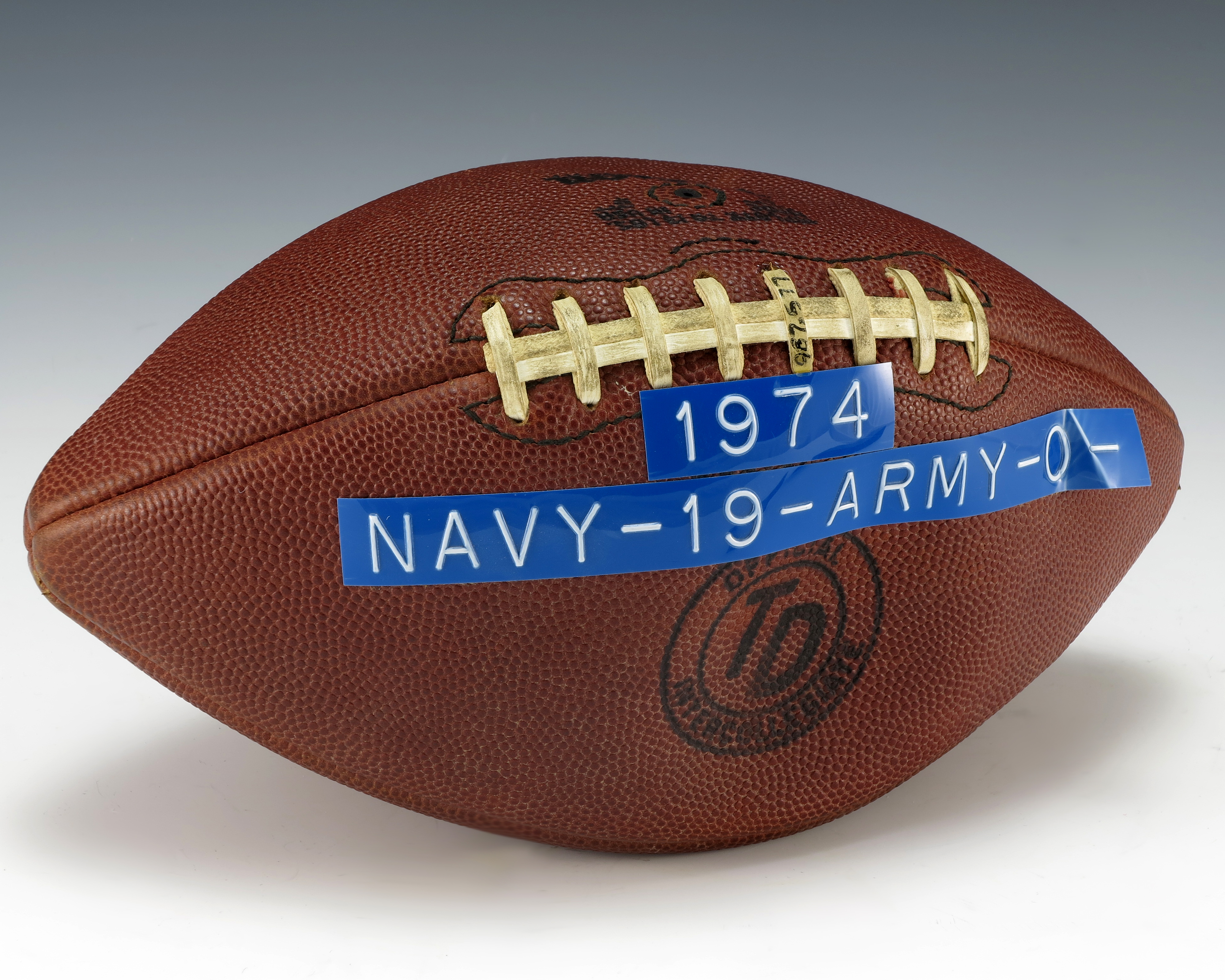
The 1974 Army–Navy Game with the game's final score (Navy 19, Army 0) on a football

=== Background and cultural context ===
The early development of the Army–Navy Game coincided with the evolution of American football and its embrace by military institutions as a tool for building leadership, discipline, and physical readiness. American football in this era was widely viewed as a direct surrogate for warfare training and a means of instilling martial virtues in young men following the American Civil War.

President Theodore Roosevelt, a staunch advocate of the "strenuous life," strongly supported the sport as essential for developing physical courage and "war-ready" leaders. As Assistant Secretary of the Navy, Roosevelt played a key role in restoring the suspended Army–Navy series in 1899. He later became the first sitting U.S. president to attend the game in 1901 and personally intervened in 1905, convening a White House meeting with coaches—including Walter Camp (1859–1925), known as the "Father of American Football"—to reform the increasingly brutal game while preserving its rugged character. During World War I, Camp served as an athletic adviser to the U.S. military. Concerned about recruit fitness, he created the "Daily Dozen" exercise program that was adopted by both the Army and Navy.

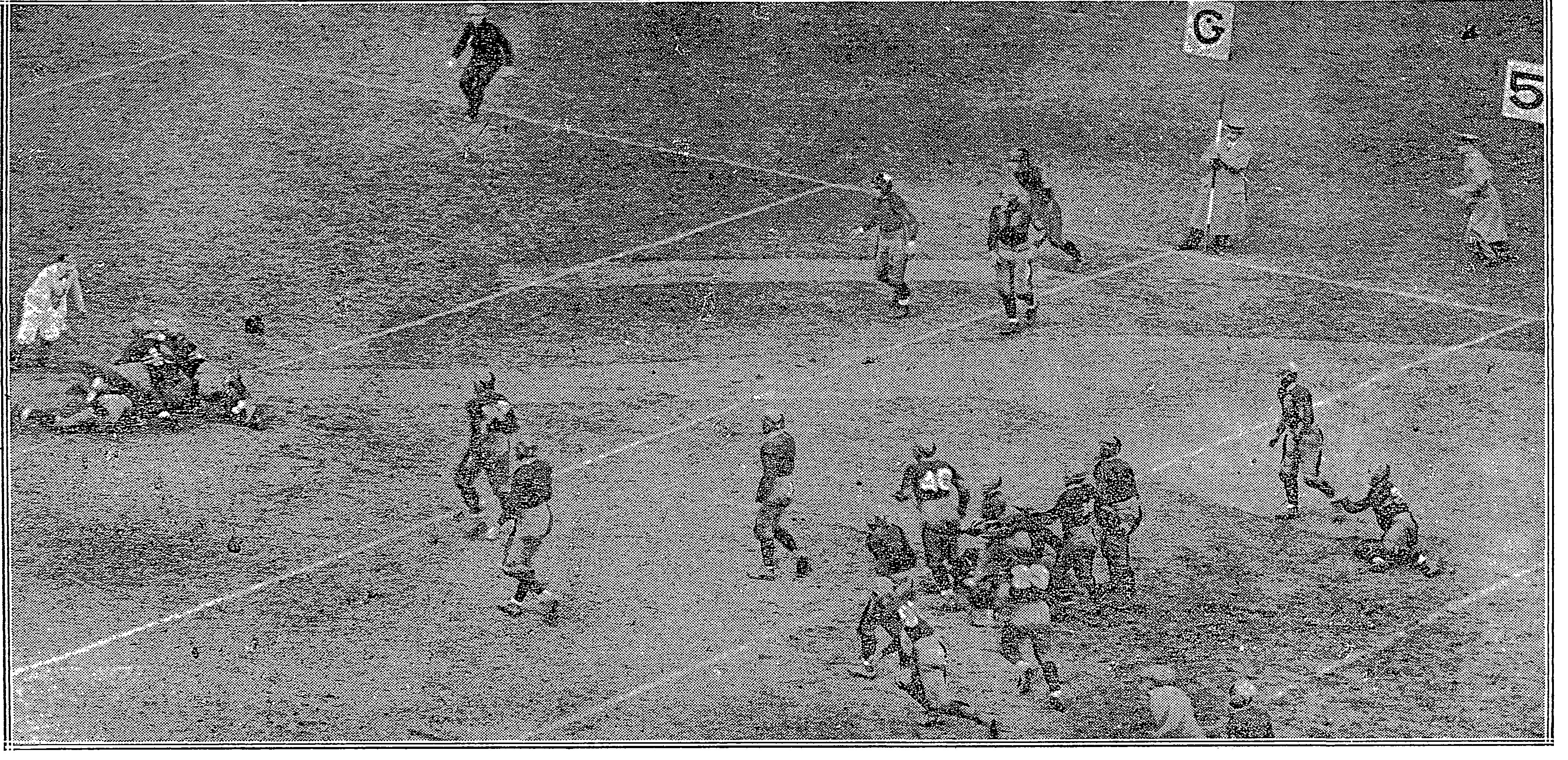
Army scoring the winning touchdown vs. Navy at Polo Grounds, Nov.28,1925

=== Early games and establishment ===
The first game between Army and Navy was on November 29, 1890. Since then, the two academies have played annually in all but ten years, and have played in consecutive annual games every season since 1930. Throughout its history, the game has been played in several neutral locations, including New York City and Baltimore, but it is most commonly played in Philadelphia, which is roughly equidistant from the two academies.

The games between 1890 and 1893 alternated between the campus of each academy. The series was suspended after 1893 due to objections of the academy superintendents. Through the efforts and diplomacy of Philadelphia surgeon and sportsman Dr. J. William White, the University of Pennsylvania gained the agreement of the academies to resume the series in 1899 at recently constructed Franklin Field inaugurating the tradition of playing the game in Philadelphia. Soldier Field had its formal dedication on November 27, 1926, when it hosted the Army–Navy Game. The game was attended by over 110,000 people including Knute Rockne who attended instead of coaching Notre Dame that day.

=== Prominence and evolution ===
For much of the first two thirds of the 20th century, both Army and Navy were often national powers, and the game occasionally had national championship implications. However, as the level of play in college football increased, both academies' stringent admissions standards and height and weight limits made it difficult for them to compete. Since 1963, only the 1996, 2010, 2016, 2017, 2024, and 2025 games have seen both teams enter with winning records. Nonetheless, the game is considered a college football institution. The tradition associated with the annual game has kept it airing nationally on radio since 1930 and television since 1945. It has remained an over-the-air broadcast even in the age of cable, satellite, and streaming.

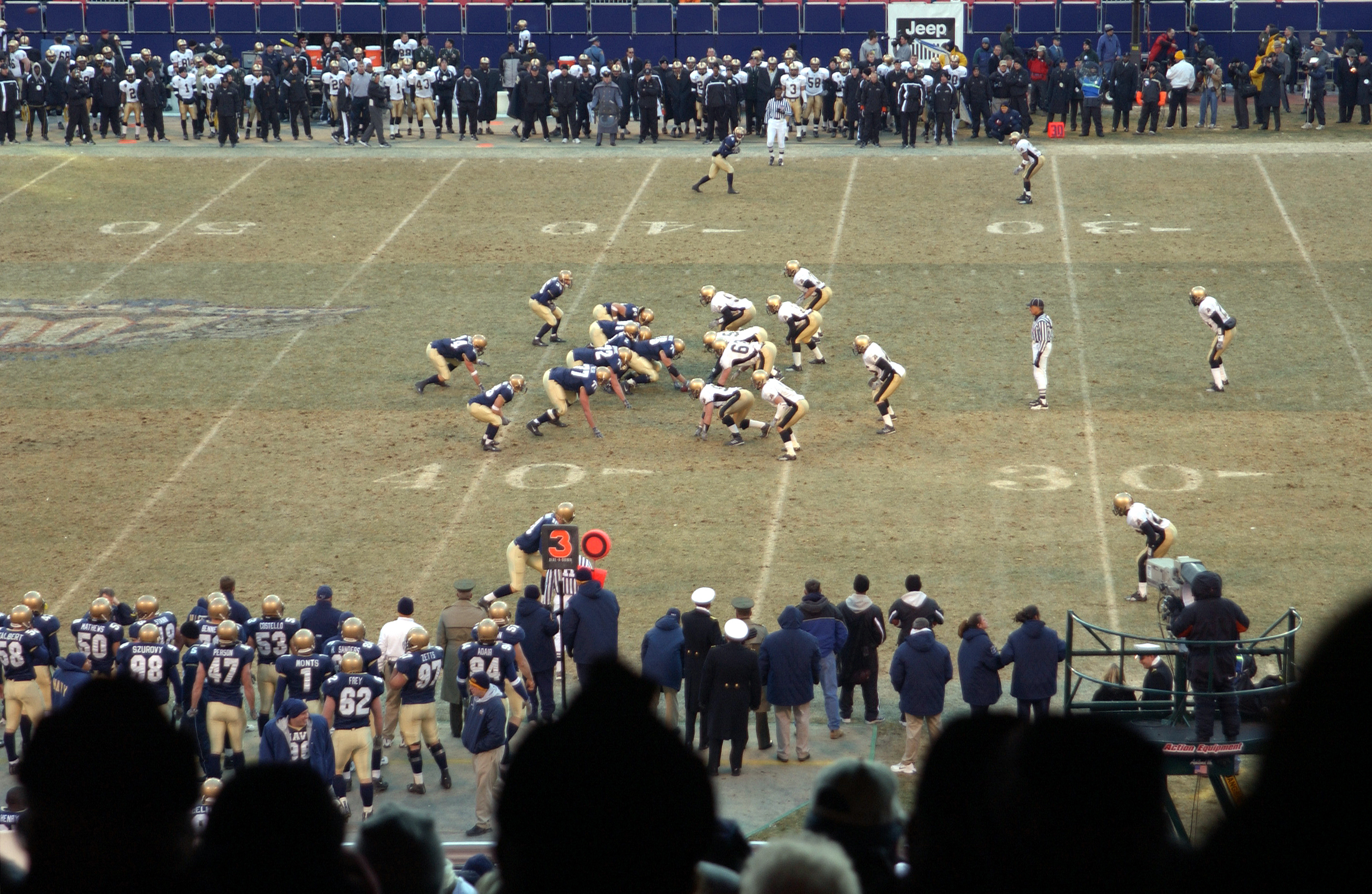
The 2002 Army–Navy Game at Giants Stadium with Navy in dark and Army in white

The game is especially emotional for the seniors, called "first classmen" by both academies, since it is typically the last competitive regular season football game they will ever play (though they sometimes play in a subsequent bowl game). However, some participants in the Army–Navy Game have gone on to professional football careers. For example, quarterback Roger Staubach (Navy, 1965) went on to a Hall of Fame career with the National Football League's Dallas Cowboys that included starting at quarterback in two Super Bowl victories (including being named the Most Valuable Player of Super Bowl VI), and Alejandro Villanueva (Army, 2010) was later an offensive tackle with the NFL's Pittsburgh Steelers and Baltimore Ravens.

The game is the last of three contests in the annual Commander-in-Chief's Trophy series, awarded to each season's winner of the triangular series among Army, Navy, and Air Force since 1972. The rivalries Army and Navy have with Air Force are much less intense than the Army–Navy rivalry, primarily due to the relative youth of the Air Force Academy, established in 1954, and the physical distance between the Air Force Academy and the other two schools. The Army–Air Force and Navy–Air Force games are usually played at the academies' regular home fields, although on occasion they have been held at a neutral field.

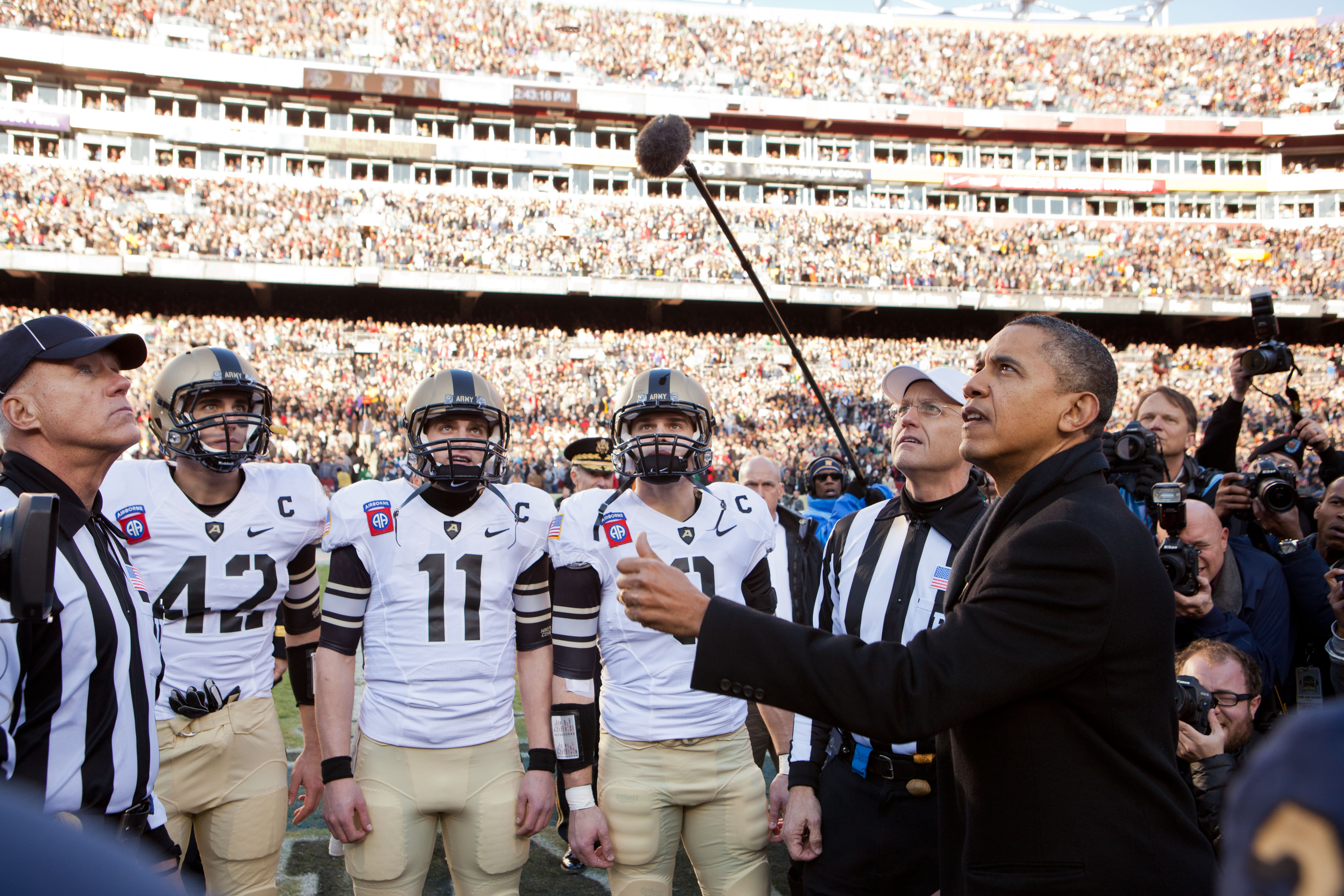
President Barack Obama performs the coin toss before the annual Army vs. Navy football game at FedEx Field in Landover, Md., Saturday, December 10, 2011.

Since 1901, there have been ten sitting presidents of the United States to attend the Army–Navy Game. The first was Theodore Roosevelt, who attended the game in 1901 and 1905. Harry S. Truman attended all but one edition during his eight years in office (1945–1953), missing the 1951 game due to vacation. George W. Bush attended three times in 2001, 2004, and 2008. President Donald Trump attended three times in 2018, 2019, and 2020 during his first presidency, and one time in 2025 during his second presidency. Trump also attended two games as president-elect in 2016 and 2024. John F. Kennedy attended both games played during his presidency in 1961 and 1962; he was assassinated fifteen days before the 1963 game. Presidents who each attended once include Woodrow Wilson (1913), Calvin Coolidge (1924), Gerald Ford (1974), Bill Clinton (1996), and Barack Obama (2011).

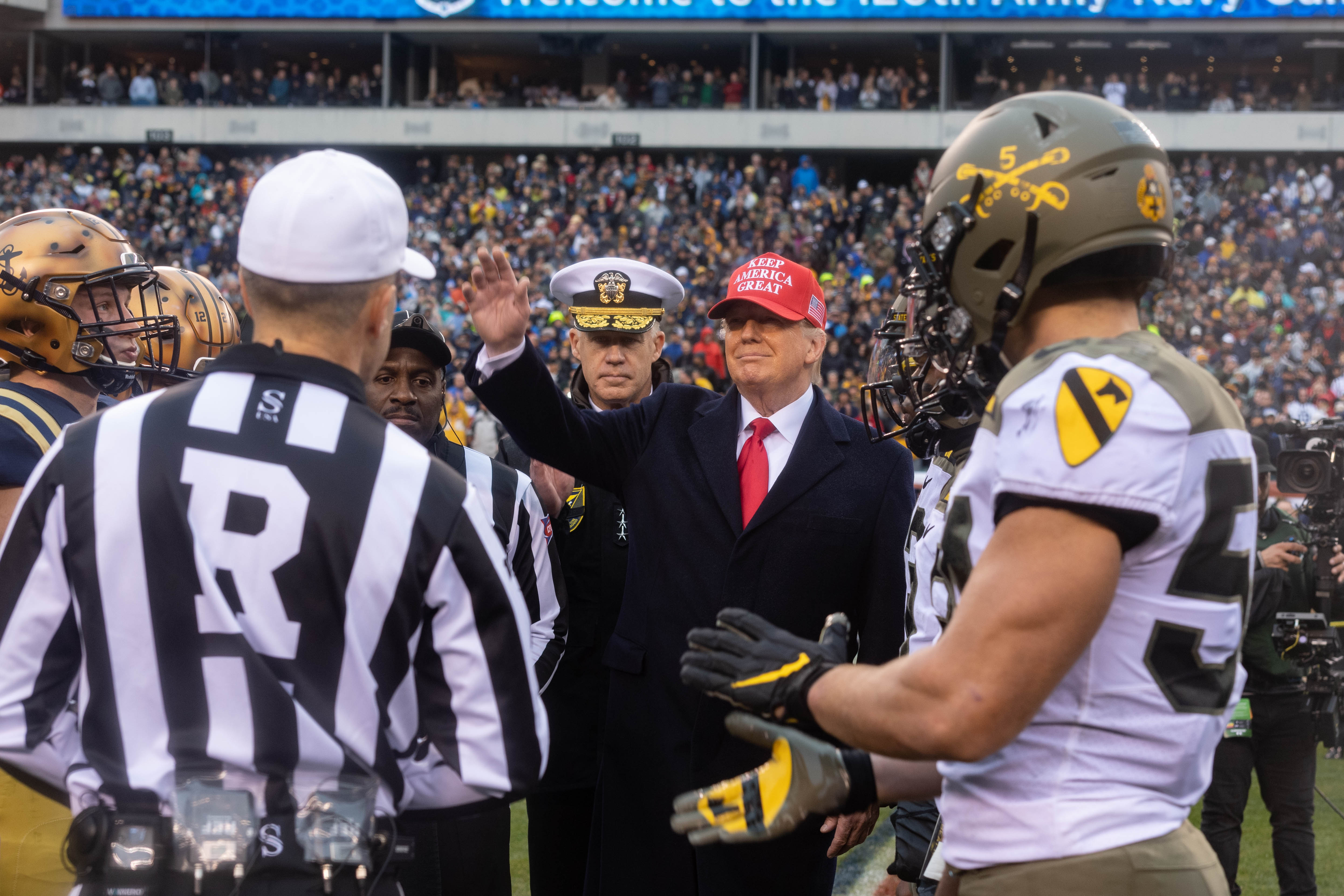
President Donald Trump makes the opening coin toss before the Army-Navy football game at Lincoln Financial Field. The game marked the 120th meeting between the U.S. Naval Academy Midshipmen and the U.S. Army Black Knights

Until 2009, the Army–Navy game was played on Thanksgiving weekend, a date on which most major college football teams end their regular seasons. That year, the game moved to the second Saturday in December to reduce competition from other games, and reduce conflicts with the conference championships; this scheduling gave the game an "exclusive" window with little competition from other Division I FBS games, falling in a buffer period between the end of the regular season and the start of bowl season.

In the 2024 season, Army joined Navy in the American Conference in football. As part of the arrangement, the Army–Navy Game remains an out-of-conference date for both schools, and still played on an annual basis in the week after the American Conference championship game. It is therefore conceivable that Army and Navy could contest the conference championship and their annual game in consecutive weeks.

The 2024 expansion of the College Football Playoff (CFP) to a 12-team format saw bowl games begin on the second Saturday in December to accommodate its new first round; that year's Army–Navy game would share its date with the first bowl game of that season, the 2024 Salute to Veterans Bowl. However, the bowl was scheduled with a 9 p.m. ET kickoff well after the conclusion of the Army–Navy game, which had a 3 p.m. kickoff.

As discussions regarding further expansion of the CFP began in 2025, concerns were raised that the Army–Navy game could lose its "exclusive" window and have to compete with CFP games, risking a reduction in viewership and prominence. Army head coach Jeff Monken proposed that the game be moved back to Thanksgiving weekend, although the Navy athletic director Michael Kelly disagreed. In March 2026, President Donald Trump issued an executive order directing the chairman of the Federal Communications Commission to "[establish] an exclusive window for the Army–Navy Game, during which no other college football game is broadcast", and to consider violations of this window to be detrimental to a broadcaster's public interest obligations.

In November 2026, the CFP officially announced that it would expand to 24 teams beginning in 2027. As the power conferences agreed to abolish conference championship games under the new format, it was announced that the Army–Navy Game would move up one week earlier to the first weekend of December starting in 2027.

== Traditions ==
Pep rally at the Pentagon before the Army–Navy football game in 2013.

The rivalry between Annapolis and West Point, while friendly, is intense. The phrases "Beat Navy!" and "Beat Army!" are ingrained in the respective institutions and have become a symbol of competitiveness, not just in the Army–Navy Game, but in the service of the country. The phrases are often used at the close of (informal) letters by graduates of both academies.

A long-standing tradition at the Army–Navy football game is to conduct a formal "prisoner exchange" as part of the pre-game activities. The prisoners are the cadets and midshipmen currently spending the semester studying at the sister academy. After the exchange, students have a brief reprieve to enjoy the game with their comrades. During the pre-game ceremony, the invocation is followed by the American national anthem sung by members of the Military Academy and Naval Academy choirs rather than a notable recording artist or marching band. At the end of the game, both teams' almae matres are performed. The winning team stands alongside the losing team and faces the losing academy's students; then the losing team accompanies the winning team, facing their students. This is done in a show of mutual respect and solidarity. Since the winning team's alma mater is always played last, the phrase "sing second" has become synonymous with winning the rivalry game.

== Notable games ==
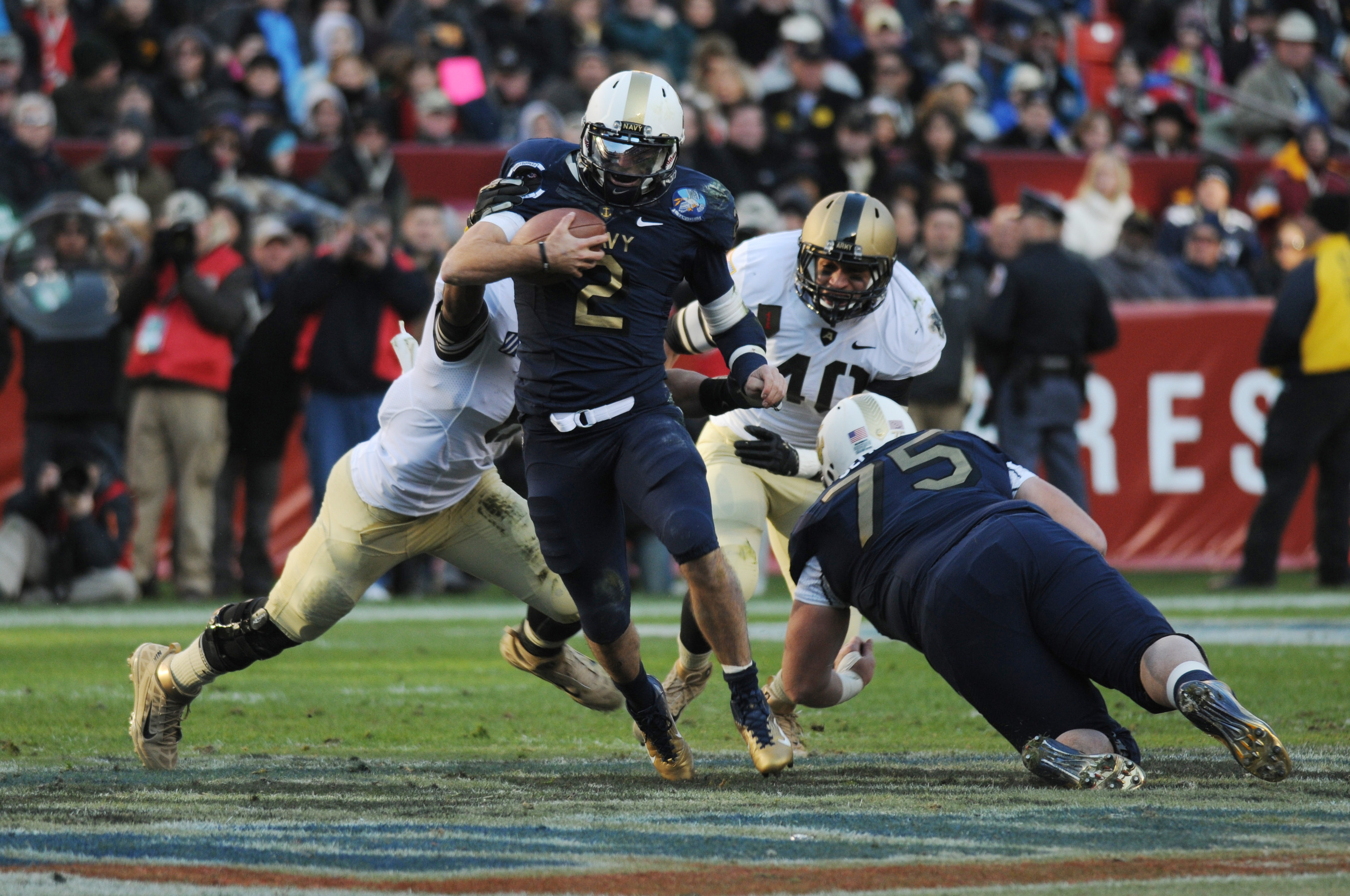
Navy had its tenth consecutive win in the series in the 112th Army–Navy game in 2011

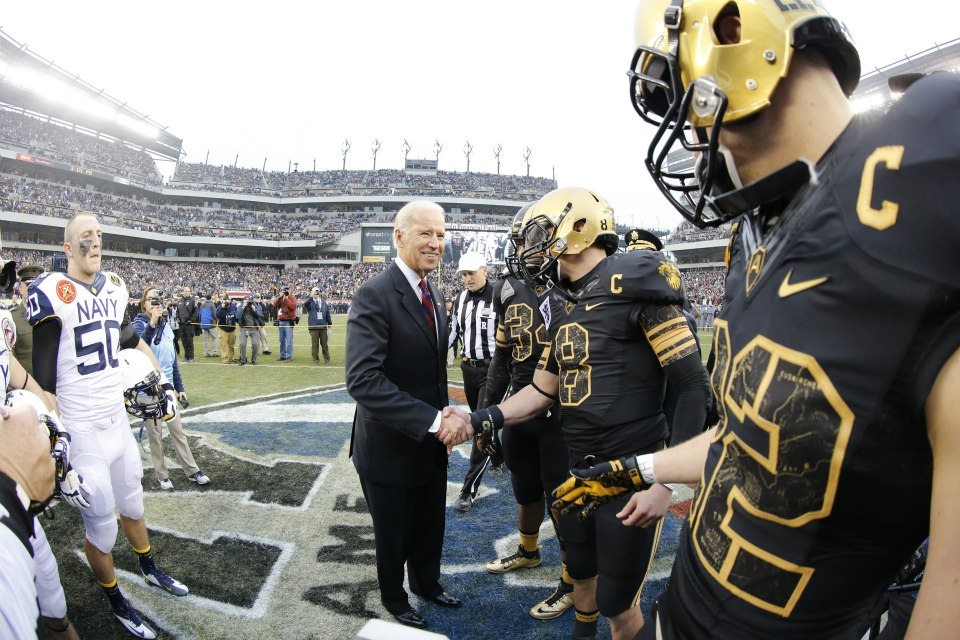
Then Vice President Joe Biden at the coin toss prior to the 113th Army–Navy Game in 2012

Navy Midshipman (and later Admiral) Joseph Mason Reeves wore what is widely regarded as the first football helmet in the 1893 Army–Navy Game. He had been advised by a Navy doctor that another kick to his head would result in intellectual disability or even death, so he commissioned an Annapolis shoemaker to make him a helmet out of leather.

On November 27, 1926, the Army–Navy Game was held in Chicago for the National Dedication of Soldier Field as a monument to American servicemen who had fought in World War I. Navy came to the game undefeated, while Army had only lost to Notre Dame. Played before a crowd of over 100,000, the teams fought to a 21–21 tie, resulting in Navy being awarded a share of the national championship.

In both the 1944 and 1945 contests, Army and Navy entered the game ranked #1 and #2 respectively. The 1945 game was labeled the "game of the century" before it was played. Army (9–0) defeated Navy (7–0–1) with a score of 32–13. Navy's tie was against Notre Dame.

In 1963, shortly after the assassination of President John F. Kennedy, Jacqueline Kennedy urged the academies to play after there had been talk of cancellation. Originally scheduled for November 30, 1963, the game was played on December 7, 1963, also coinciding with the 22nd anniversary of Pearl Harbor Day. In front of a crowd of 102,000 people at Philadelphia Municipal Stadium, later renamed John F. Kennedy Stadium, junior (second class midshipman) quarterback Roger Staubach led number two ranked Navy to victory which clinched a Cotton Bowl national championship matchup with Texas. Army was led by junior (second class cadet) quarterback Rollie Stichweh. Stichweh led off the game with a touchdown drive that featured the first use of instant replay. Army nearly won the game after another touchdown and two point conversion, Stichweh recovered the onside kick and drove the ball to the Navy 2 yard line. On 4th down and no timeouts, crowd noise prevented Stichweh from calling a play and time expired with the 21–15 final score. Staubach won the Heisman Trophy that year and was bumped off the scheduled cover of Life magazine due to the coverage of the assassination. Stichweh and Staubach would meet again in 1964 as seniors where Stichweh's Army would defeat Staubach's Navy. In that game, Calvin Huey of Navy became the first African-American to play in the series. Staubach went on to serve in the Navy and afterward became a Pro Football Hall of Fame quarterback with the Dallas Cowboys. Stichweh served five years in Vietnam with the 173rd Airborne Brigade. Stichweh was inducted into the Army Sports Hall of Fame in 2012.

On December 10, 2016, Army defeated Navy for the first time since 2001 with a 21–17 victory, snapping its 14-game losing streak against Navy.

In 2022, Army defeated Navy by a score of 20–17 in double overtime in the first overtime game in the series' history.

== Venues ==
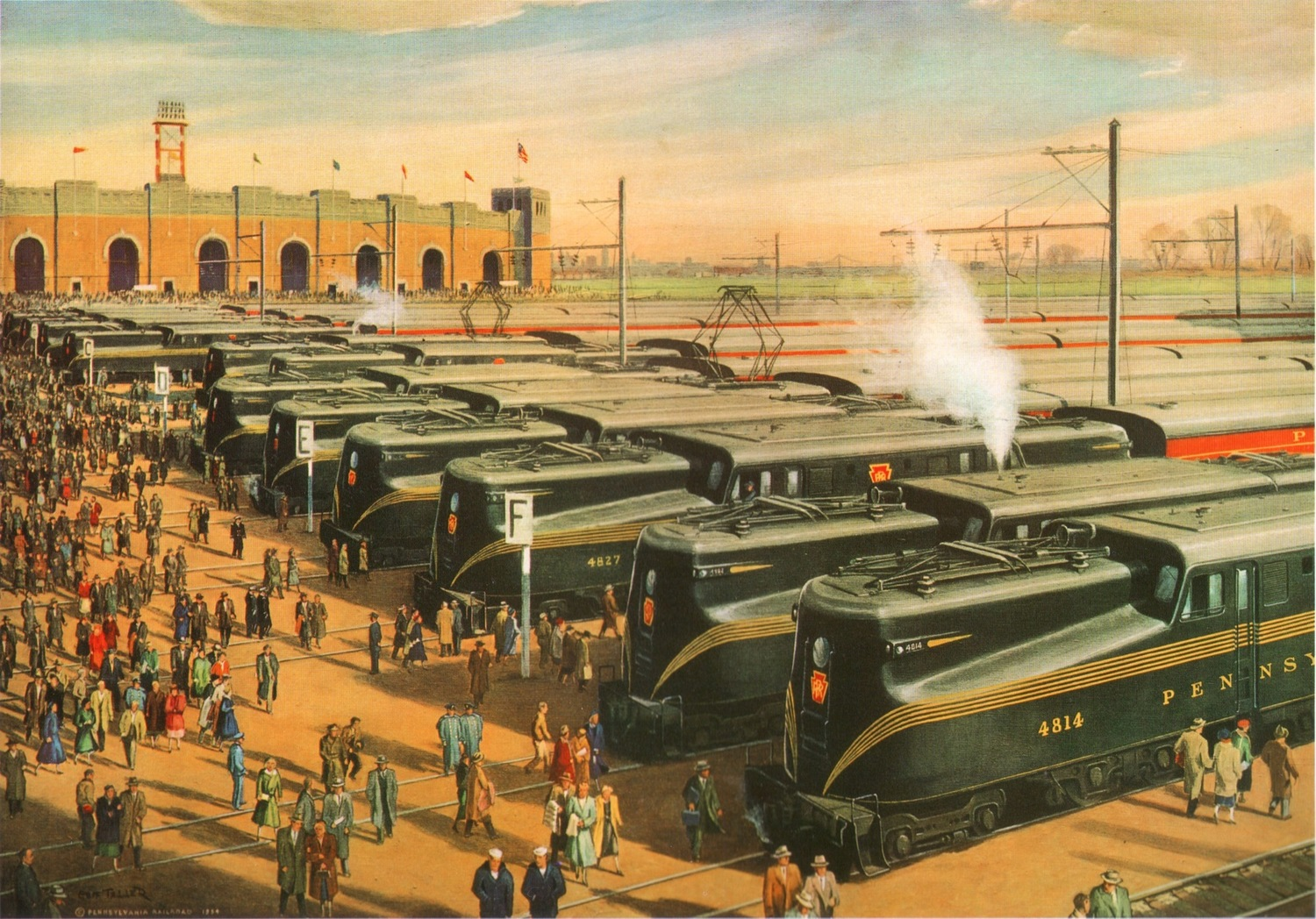
Pennsylvania Railroad trains lined up at a temporary station outside the Municipal Stadium after the 1955 game

The 1926 Army-Navy game at Soldier Field in Chicago

Only seven games have ever been held on the campus of either academy, primarily because neither team has ever played at an on-campus stadium large enough to accommodate the large crowds that attend. The rivalry's first four games were hosted on the parade grounds of the respective academies. For all but three years since 1899, it has been held at a neutral site. Two were held on campus due to World War II travel restrictions (1942 at Navy's old Thompson Stadium and 1943 at Michie Stadium), and the 2020 game was held at Michie Stadium due to COVID-19 restrictions in Philadelphia.

Philadelphia has been the traditional home of the Army–Navy game, due to the historic nature of the city and its location approximately halfway between West Point and Annapolis. Through the 2023 meeting, 90 of the 124 games in the series have been contested in Philadelphia, including every game from 1932 to 1982 except three games that were relocated due to World War II travel restrictions. For decades, the Pennsylvania Railroad and its successors offered game-day service to all Army–Navy games in Philadelphia using a sprawling temporary station constructed each year near Municipal Stadium on the railroad's Greenwich freight yard. The service, with more than 40 trains serving as many as 30,000 attendees, was the single largest concentrated passenger rail movement in the country.

All games contested in Philadelphia through 1935 were played at Franklin Field, the home field of the University of Pennsylvania. From 1936 through 1979, all games contested in Philadelphia were held at Municipal Stadium, renamed John F. Kennedy Stadium in 1964. From 1980 to 2001, all games contested in Philadelphia took place at Veterans Stadium. Since 2003, all games contested in Philadelphia have been played at Lincoln Financial Field.

Outside of Philadelphia, the New York area has been the most frequent Army–Navy site. The Polo Grounds holds the record for most games hosted outside of Philadelphia with nine. It was the location of all New York City games through 1927. Yankee Stadium was the site of the game in 1930 and 1931. Six games have been hosted in New Jersey: 1905 at Osborne Field at Princeton University, four games at Giants Stadium from 1989 to 2002, and 2021 at MetLife Stadium.

A number of games throughout the history of the series have also been hosted in Maryland. In Baltimore, Municipal Stadium was the location of the 1924 and 1944 games. Four games were played at M&T Bank Stadium in Baltimore since 2000. In 2011 and 2024, the game was played at FedExField in Landover, Maryland.

The 2023 game was held at Gillette Stadium in Foxborough, Massachusetts.

The Rose Bowl is the only site west of the Mississippi River where an Army–Navy game has been played, in 1983. Pasadena, California, home to the Rose Bowl, paid for the travel expenses of all the students and supporters of both academies, including 9,437 in all. The game was held at the Rose Bowl that year because there are a large number of military installations and servicemen and women, along with many retired military personnel, on the West Coast. The game has been held one other time in a non-East Coast venue, at Chicago's Soldier Field, which hosted the 1926 game.

=== Future venues ===
- December 12, 2026 – MetLife Stadium in East Rutherford, New Jersey
- December 4, 2027 – Lincoln Financial Field in Philadelphia

=== Total games by venue and geography ===
Stadiums

Venue	Games	Army victories	Navy victories	Tie games	First game	Most recent game
John F. Kennedy Stadium (demolished)	41	16	22	3	1936	1979
Franklin Field	18	11	7	0	1899	1935
Veterans Stadium (demolished)	17	11	5	1	1980	2001
Lincoln Financial Field	14	3	11	0	2003	2022
Polo Grounds (demolished)	9	5	3	1	1913	1927
Giants Stadium (demolished)	4	1	3	0	1989	2002
M&T Bank Stadium	5	1	4	0	2000	2025
The Plain	2	0	2	0	1890	1892
Worden Field	2	1	1	0	1891	1893
Municipal Stadium (Baltimore) (demolished)	2	2	0	0	1924	1944
Yankee Stadium (demolished)	2	2	0	0	1930	1931
Michie Stadium	2	1	1	0	1943	2020
Northwest Stadium	2	0	2	0	2011	2024
Osborne Field (demolished)	1	0	0	1	1905	1905
Soldier Field	1	0	0	1	1926	1926
Thompson Stadium (demolished)	1	0	1	0	1942	1942
Rose Bowl	1	0	1	0	1983	1983
MetLife Stadium	1	0	1	0	2021	2021
Gillette Stadium	1	1	0	0	2023	2023

Cities

City	Games	Army victories	Navy victories	Tie games	First game	Most recent game
Philadelphia	90	41	45	4	1899	2022
New York City	11	7	3	1	1913	1931
Baltimore	7	3	4	0	1924	2025
East Rutherford, New Jersey	5	1	4	0	1989	2021
West Point, New York	4	1	3	0	1890	2020
Annapolis, Maryland	3	1	2	0	1891	1942
Summerfield, Maryland (Note: Northwest Stadium is not located within an incorporated municipality. While "Landover, MD" is the recommended "city name" by the USPS, it lies within the census-designated place of Summerfield.)	2	0	2	0	2011	2024
Princeton, New Jersey	1	0	0	1	1905	1905
Chicago	1	0	0	1	1926	1926
Pasadena, California	1	0	1	0	1983	1983
Foxborough, Massachusetts	1	1	0	0	2023	2023

Metropolitan areas

Metro area	Games	Army victories	Navy victories	Tie games	First game	Most recent game
Philadelphia	90	41	45	4	1899	2022
New York	21	9	10	2	1890	2021
Baltimore–Washington	12	4	8	0	1891	2025
Chicago	1	0	0	1	1926	1926
Los Angeles	1	0	1	0	1983	1983
Boston	1	1	0	0	2023	2023

States

State	Games	Army victories	Navy victories	Tie games	First game	Most recent game
Pennsylvania	90	41	45	4	1899	2022
New York	15	8	6	1	1890	2020
Maryland	12	4	8	0	1891	2024
New Jersey	6	1	4	1	1905	2021
Illinois	1	0	0	1	1926	1926
California	1	0	1	0	1983	1983
Massachusetts	1	1	0	0	2023	2023

== Game results ==
Rankings are from the AP Poll.

Army victories	Navy victories	Tie games

No.	Date	Location	Winning team		Losing team	
1	November 29, 1890	West Point, NY	Navy	24	Army	0
2	November 28, 1891	Annapolis, MD	Army	32	Navy	16
3	November 26, 1892	West Point, NY	Navy	12	Army	4
4	December 2, 1893	Annapolis, MD	Navy	6	Army	4
5	December 2, 1899	Philadelphia, PA	Army	17	Navy	5
6	December 1, 1900	Philadelphia, PA	Navy	11	Army	7
7	November 30, 1901	Philadelphia, PA	Army	11	Navy	5
8	November 29, 1902	Philadelphia, PA	Army	22	Navy	8
9	November 28, 1903	Philadelphia, PA	Army	40	Navy	5
10	November 26, 1904	Philadelphia, PA	Army	11	Navy	0
11	December 2, 1905	Princeton, NJ	Tie	6	Tie	6
12	December 1, 1906	Philadelphia, PA	Navy	10	Army	0
13	November 30, 1907	Philadelphia, PA	Navy	6	Army	0
14	November 28, 1908	Philadelphia, PA	Army	6	Navy	4
15	November 26, 1910	Philadelphia, PA	Navy	3	Army	0
16	November 25, 1911	Philadelphia, PA	Navy	3	Army	0
17	November 30, 1912	Philadelphia, PA	Navy	6	Army	0
18	November 29, 1913	New York, NY	Army	22	Navy	9
19	November 28, 1914	Philadelphia, PA	Army	20	Navy	0
20	November 27, 1915	New York, NY	Army	14	Navy	0
21	November 25, 1916	New York, NY	Army	15	Navy	7
22	November 29, 1919	New York, NY	Navy	6	Army	0
23	November 27, 1920	New York, NY	Navy	7	Army	0
24	November 26, 1921	New York, NY	Navy	7	Army	0
25	November 25, 1922	Philadelphia, PA	Army	17	Navy	14
26	November 24, 1923	New York, NY	Tie	0	Tie	0
27	November 29, 1924	Baltimore, MD	Army	12	Navy	0
28	November 28, 1925	New York, NY	Army	10	Navy	3
29	November 27, 1926	Chicago, IL	Tie	21	Tie	21
30	November 26, 1927	New York, NY	Army	14	Navy	9
31	December 13, 1930	New York, NY	Army	6	Navy	0
32	December 12, 1931	New York, NY	Army	17	Navy	7
33	December 3, 1932	Philadelphia, PA	Army	20	Navy	0
34	November 25, 1933	Philadelphia, PA	Army	12	Navy	7
35	December 1, 1934	Philadelphia, PA	Navy	3	Army	0
36	November 30, 1935	Philadelphia, PA	Army	28	Navy	6
37	November 28, 1936	Philadelphia, PA	Navy	7	Army	0
38	November 27, 1937	Philadelphia, PA	Army	6	Navy	0
39	November 26, 1938	Philadelphia, PA	Army	14	Navy	7
40	December 2, 1939	Philadelphia, PA	Navy	10	Army	0
41	November 30, 1940	Philadelphia, PA	Navy	14	Army	0
42	November 29, 1941	Philadelphia, PA	No. 11 Navy	14	Army	6
43	November 28, 1942	Annapolis, MD	Navy	14	Army	0
44	November 27, 1943	West Point, NY	No. 6 Navy	13	No. 7 Army	0
45	December 2, 1944	Baltimore, MD	No. 1 Army	23	No. 2 Navy	7
46	December 1, 1945	Philadelphia, PA	No. 1 Army	32	No. 2 Navy	13
47	November 30, 1946	Philadelphia, PA	No. 1 Army	21	Navy	18
48	November 29, 1947	Philadelphia, PA	No. 12 Army	21	Navy	0
49	November 27, 1948	Philadelphia, PA	Tie	21	Tie	21
50	November 26, 1949	Philadelphia, PA	No. 4 Army	38	Navy	0
51	December 2, 1950	Philadelphia, PA	Navy	14	No. 2 Army	2
52	December 1, 1951	Philadelphia, PA	Navy	42	Army	7
53	November 29, 1952	Philadelphia, PA	Navy	7	Army	0
54	November 28, 1953	Philadelphia, PA	No. 18 Army	20	Navy	7
55	November 27, 1954	Philadelphia, PA	No. 6 Navy	27	No. 5 Army	20
56	November 26, 1955	Philadelphia, PA	Army	14	No. 11 Navy	6
57	December 1, 1956	Philadelphia, PA	Tie	7	Tie	7
58	November 30, 1957	Philadelphia, PA	No. 8 Navy	14	No. 10 Army	0
59	November 29, 1958	Philadelphia, PA	No. 5 Army	22	Navy	6
60	November 28, 1959	Philadelphia, PA	Navy	43	Army	12
61	November 26, 1960	Philadelphia, PA	No. 7 Navy	17	Army	12
62	December 2, 1961	Philadelphia, PA	Navy	13	Army	7
63	December 1, 1962	Philadelphia, PA	Navy	34	Army	14
64	December 7, 1963	Philadelphia, PA	No. 2 Navy	21	Army	15

No.	Date	Location	Winning team		Losing team	
65	November 28, 1964	Philadelphia, PA	Army	11	Navy	8
66	November 27, 1965	Philadelphia, PA	Tie	7	Tie	7
67	November 26, 1966	Philadelphia, PA	Army	20	Navy	7
68	December 2, 1967	Philadelphia, PA	Navy	19	Army	14
69	November 30, 1968	Philadelphia, PA	Army	21	Navy	14
70	November 29, 1969	Philadelphia, PA	Army	27	Navy	0
71	November 28, 1970	Philadelphia, PA	Navy	11	Army	7
72	November 27, 1971	Philadelphia, PA	Army	24	Navy	23
73	December 2, 1972	Philadelphia, PA	Army	23	Navy	15
74	December 1, 1973	Philadelphia, PA	Navy	51	Army	0
75	November 30, 1974	Philadelphia, PA	Navy	19	Army	0
76	November 29, 1975	Philadelphia, PA	Navy	30	Army	6
77	November 27, 1976	Philadelphia, PA	Navy	38	Army	10
78	November 26, 1977	Philadelphia, PA	Army	17	Navy	14
79	December 2, 1978	Philadelphia, PA	Navy	28	Army	0
80	December 1, 1979	Philadelphia, PA	Navy	31	Army	7
81	November 29, 1980	Philadelphia, PA	Navy	33	Army	6
82	December 5, 1981	Philadelphia, PA	Tie	3	Tie	3
83	December 4, 1982	Philadelphia, PA	Navy	24	Army	7
84	November 25, 1983	Pasadena, CA	Navy	42	Army	13
85	December 1, 1984	Philadelphia, PA	Army	28	Navy	11
86	December 7, 1985	Philadelphia, PA	Navy	17	Army	7
87	December 4, 1986	Philadelphia, PA	Army	27	Navy	7
88	December 5, 1987	Philadelphia, PA	Army	17	Navy	3
89	December 3, 1988	Philadelphia, PA	Army	20	Navy	15
90	December 9, 1989	East Rutherford, NJ	Navy	19	Army	17
91	December 8, 1990	Philadelphia, PA	Army	30	Navy	20
92	December 7, 1991	Philadelphia, PA	Navy	24	Army	3
93	December 5, 1992	Philadelphia, PA	Army	25	Navy	24
94	December 4, 1993	East Rutherford, NJ	Army	16	Navy	14
95	December 3, 1994	Philadelphia, PA	Army	22	Navy	20
96	December 2, 1995	Philadelphia, PA	Army	14	Navy	13
97	December 7, 1996	Philadelphia, PA	No. 23 Army	28	Navy	24
98	December 6, 1997	East Rutherford, NJ	Navy	39	Army	7
99	December 5, 1998	Philadelphia, PA	Army	34	Navy	30
100	December 4, 1999	Philadelphia, PA	Navy	19	Army	9
101	December 2, 2000	Baltimore, MD	Navy	30	Army	28
102	December 1, 2001	Philadelphia, PA	Army	26	Navy	17
103	December 7, 2002	East Rutherford, NJ	Navy	58	Army	12
104	December 6, 2003	Philadelphia, PA	Navy	34	Army	6
105	December 4, 2004	Philadelphia, PA	Navy	42	Army	13
106	December 3, 2005	Philadelphia, PA	Navy	42	Army	23
107	December 2, 2006	Philadelphia, PA	Navy	26	Army	14
108	December 1, 2007	Baltimore, MD	Navy	38	Army	3
109	December 6, 2008	Philadelphia, PA	Navy	34	Army	0
110	December 12, 2009	Philadelphia, PA	Navy	17	Army	3
111	December 11, 2010	Philadelphia, PA	Navy	31	Army	17
112	December 10, 2011	Landover, MD	Navy	27	Army	21
113	December 8, 2012	Philadelphia, PA	Navy	17	Army	13
114	December 14, 2013	Philadelphia, PA	Navy	34	Army	7
115	December 13, 2014	Baltimore, MD	Navy	17	Army	10
116	December 12, 2015	Philadelphia, PA	No. 21 Navy	21	Army	17
117	December 10, 2016	Baltimore, MD	Army	21	Navy	17
118	December 9, 2017	Philadelphia, PA	Army	14	Navy	13
119	December 8, 2018	Philadelphia, PA	No. 22 Army	17	Navy	10
120	December 14, 2019	Philadelphia, PA	No. 21 Navy	31	Army	7
121	December 12, 2020	West Point, NY	Army	15	Navy	0
122	December 11, 2021	East Rutherford, NJ	Navy	17	Army	13
123	December 10, 2022	Philadelphia, PA	Army	20	Navy	17^{2OT}
124	December 9, 2023	Foxborough, MA	Army	17	Navy	11
125	December 14, 2024	Landover, MD	Navy	31	No. 19 Army	13
126	December 13, 2025	Baltimore, MD	Navy	17	Army	16
Series: Navy leads 64–55–7

- Note: there were no games for the following years; 1894–1898, 1909, 1917–1918 & 1928–1929

== Accomplishments by the two rivals ==
Team	Army	Navy
National titles	5	1
Bowl appearances	11	25
Postseason bowl record	8-3	13-11-1
Conference titles	1	0
Consensus All-Americans	37	24
Heisman Trophies	3	2
All-time program record	746-552-51	757-605-57
All-time win percentage	.572	.554

== See also ==
- Air Force–Army men's ice hockey rivalry
- Army Mules
- Army–Navy Cup, a college soccer game between the same schools
- Army–Navy lacrosse rivalry
- Bill the Goat
- List of NCAA college football rivalry games
- List of most-played college football series in NCAA Division I
- Secretaries' Cup, an annual rivalry game between the Coast Guard Bears and Merchant Marine Mariners

=== Other neutral-site rivalries ===
- Florida–Georgia football rivalry
- Red River Rivalry
