= Tony Verna =

American television producer

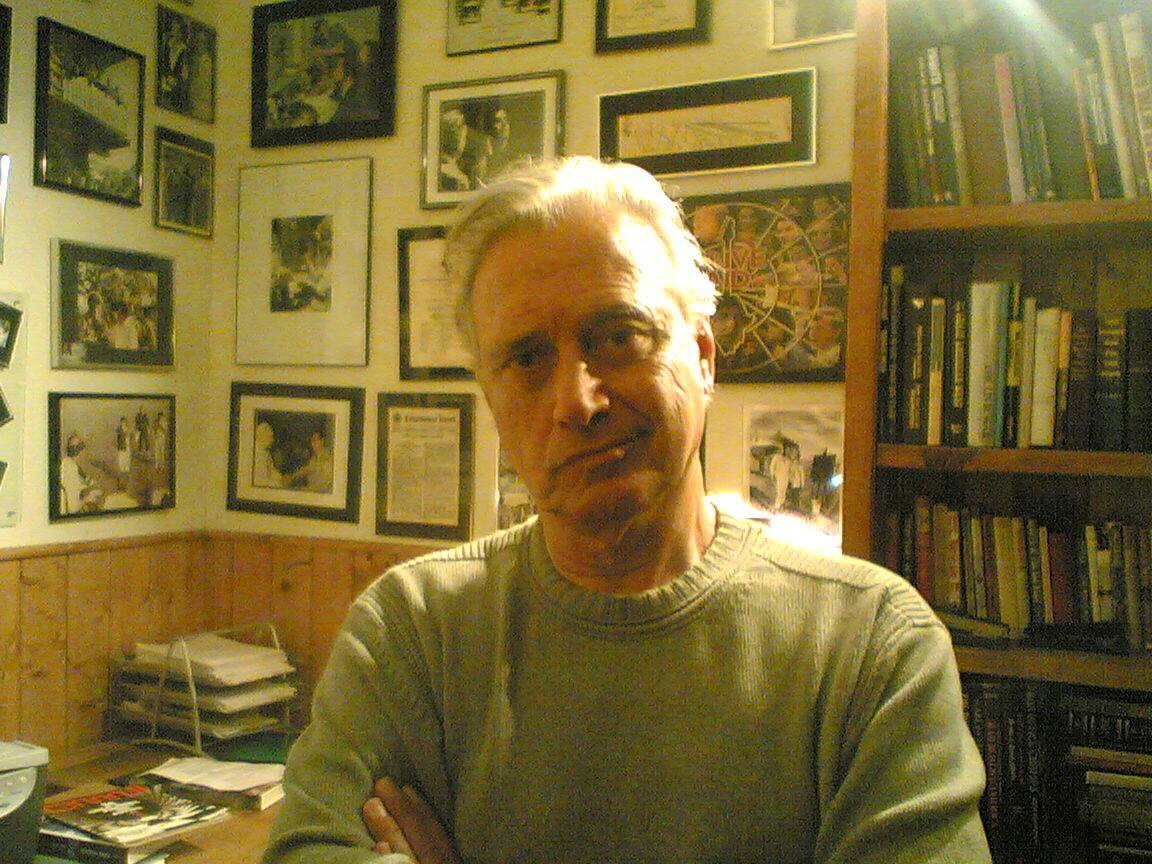
Tony Verna

Anthony F. Verna (November 26, 1933 – January 18, 2015) was a producer of television sports and entertainment blockbusters.

== Biography ==
Verna was born in Philadelphia, Pennsylvania. He died in Palm Desert, California at the age of 81.

=== Broadcast hallmarks ===
Verna's broadcast hallmark was an ability to continually come up with advances in the use of cameras, program content and creative interplay. It was this skill that prompted him to use a trick left over from radio days in order to outwit the technology of the times and allow for a play on the field to be re-broadcast "instantly."

Verna's varied career includes creating, producing and directing Pope John Paul II's billion-viewer television special "A Prayer for World Peace" and the historic music spectacular "Live Aid." As President of Caesar's Palace Productions, Verna was involved in all their spectacular entertainment projects.

=== Notables who collaborated with Verna ===
Verna worked with and or and was friends with such notables as Presidents Ronald Reagan and George H. W. Bush, Grace Kelly, Mother Teresa, Edward R. Murrow, Larry King, Rod Stewart, Burt Reynolds, Dizzy Dean, Milton Berle, Duke Ellington, Ray Charles, Mick Jagger, Christopher Reeve, Tom Selleck, Mickey Mantle, Joe DiMaggio, Rocky Marciano, Kirk Douglas, Chevy Chase, Johnny Cash and John Denver.

== Major television events ==
Tony Verna produced and/or directed the following major television events:

1955 – Major League Baseball Game of the Week with Dizzy Dean
1960 – Rome Olympics
1962 – Josip Broz Tito----ski jumping---Yugoslavia
1963 – (Dec-7) Invented the instant replay first used for the 1963 Army–Navy Game
1964 – Directed Kentucky Derby (first of 12)
1967 – Las Vegas – Liberace Special
1967 – Johnny Unitas – Instant Quarterback
1968 – Rocky Marciano, Jonathan Winters Jogging
1968 – Directed Super Bowl#2 (first of 5)
1968 – Harlem Globetrotters–Soupy Sales
1968 – Roy Rogers, Dale Evans Special
1969 – Rocky Marciano Tribute
1970 – Created The Battle of the NFL Cheerleaders CBS
1970 – Created Instant Quarterback-John Unitas
1970 – Produced and directed Pro Bowlers Tour
1972 – Directed Mike Douglas Show- Moscow
1974 – Directed Canadian Stanley Cup
1974 – Directed 12th Kentucky Derby
1974 – Directed bios Jesse Owen, Mickey Mantle and Joe DiMaggio
1975 – Mexican soccer championships
1975 – Directed Le Mans Grand Prix, France
1976 – Hired by Saudi Arabia for Montreal Olympics
1977 – Created $50,000 Challenge Winner Take All – Telly Savalas
1978 – Soupy Sales – Harlem Globetrotters
1978 – London World Circus ---Karl Wallenda
1978 – Celebrity Daredevils, Christopher Reeve
1978 – Battle of the NFL Cheerleaders
1978 – NBC Rock n Roll Classic – Rod Stewart
1978 – Created Pete Rose Roast with Milton Berle--
1979 – Billiards Mosconi-Minnesota Fats-Omar Sharif
1979 – Peoples Choice Award--Tom Selleck -Hawaii
1979 – ESPN--30 interviews with Roy Firestone
1979 – Created Weekend Heroes – Las Vegas
1979 – Directed ABC primetime All American Woman
1979 – President of Caesars Palace Productions
1980 – Ronald Reagan Network Interview
1982 – Charlton Heston-Paul Newman Debate-ABC
1984 – ABC Summer Olympics
1985 – Live Aid
1985 – Christmas Special-Mother Teresa
1985 – Christmas Celebration-Johnny Cash
1986 – Sport-Aid
1986 – Prayer For World Peace, Pope John Paul II
1987 – Omni 14 Great Minds Predict the Future
1989 – Our Common Future Special—Global
1990 – Earth 90 – Japan – John Denver
1990 – White House – George H. W. Bush
1990 – Ted Turner Goodwill Games-Larry King
1991 – Earth Day- Japan- Ray Charles
1994 – Created Superstitions Around The World – London
1996 – 2006 Consultant—Vatican and World Broadcasters

== Books ==
Tony Verna is the author of:
1970 – Playback
1987 – Live TV (commissioned by the DGA)
1993 – Global Television
2006 – Algebra 1 Murder II
2008 – Instant Replay: the Day That Changed Sports Forever

== Patents ==
Verna held U.S. Patents on the following:

- 2006 – Instant Footballer
- 2008 – Talking Replays
