= 1963 Dayton Flyers football team =

American college football season

1963 Dayton Flyers football
- Conference: Independent
- Record: 1–7–2
- Head coach: Pete Ankney (1st season)
- Home stadium: Baujan Field

1963 NCAA University Division independents football records
	Conf.			Overall
Team	W	L	T	W		L		T
No. 14 Memphis State		–		9	–	0	–	1
No. 3 Pittsburgh		–		9	–	1	–	0
No. 2 Navy		–		9	–	2	–	0
No. 12 Syracuse		–		8	–	2	–	0
Utah State		–		8	–	2	–	0
Oregon		–		8	–	3	–	0
No. 16 Penn State		–		7	–	3	–	0
Army		–		7	–	3	–	0
Air Force		–		7	–	4	–	0
Boston College		–		6	–	3	–	0
Buffalo		–		5	–	3	–	1
Southern Miss		–		5	–	3	–	1
Villanova		–		5	–	4	–	0
Oregon State		–		5	–	5	–	0
San Jose State		–		5	–	5	–	0
Xavier		–		5	–	4	–	1
West Texas State		–		4	–	4	–	1
Florida State		–		4	–	5	–	1
Colgate		–		3	–	4	–	1
New Mexico State		–		3	–	6	–	1
Colorado State		–		3	–	7	–	0
Miami (FL)		–		3	–	7	–	0
Texas Western		–		3	–	7	–	0
Detroit		–		2	–	6	–	1
Holy Cross		–		2	–	6	–	1
Notre Dame		–		2	–	7	–	0
Pacific (CA)		–		2	–	8	–	0
Houston		–		2	–	8	–	0
Boston University		–		1	–	6	–	1
Dayton		–		1	–	7	–	2
Rankings from Coaches Poll

The 1963 Dayton Flyers football team represented the University of Dayton as an independent during the 1963 NCAA University Division football season. In their first season under head coach Pete Ankney, the Flyers compiled a 1–7–2 record. Dayton played their home games at Baujan Field in Dayton, Ohio.

== Schedule ==
Date	Opponent	Site	Result	Attendance	Source
September 21	Toledo	Baujan Field; Dayton, OH	W 22–19	16,100	
September 28	Ohio	Baujan Field; Dayton, OH	L 6–13	16,900	
October 5	at Bowling Green	University Stadium; Bowling Green, OH	L 0–28	11,232	
October 12	at Louisville	Fairgrounds Stadium; Louisville, KY	L 12–13	11,501	
October 19	Xavier	Baujan Field; Dayton, OH	L 14–15		
October 26	Detroit	Baujan Field; Dayton, OH	T 14–14	13,200	
November 2	at Cincinnati	Nippert Stadium; Cincinnati, OH	L 8–35	11,000	
November 9	at Wichita	Veterans Field; Wichita, KS	L 7–12	10,089	
November 17	Miami (OH)	Baujan Field; Dayton, OH	T 27–27		
November 23	at Kent State	Memorial Stadium; Kent, OH	L 0–23	3,500	
