= List of Pacific Tigers head football coaches =

The Pacific Tigers college football team represented University of the Pacific (CA). The Tigers competed in the National Collegiate Athletic Association (NCAA) College Division in the years 1937–1968. In 1969, the team moved to National Collegiate Athletic Association (NCAA) Division I and stayed there until disbanding after the 1995 season.

The program had 16 identifiable head coaches in its 80 seasons of existence. No coach is currently identified for the initial five seasons of play.

== Coaches ==
| No. | Coach | Tenure | Seasons | Win | Loss | Tie | Pct. | Bowls |
|---|---|---|---|---|---|---|---|---|
| 1 | (no record) | 1895, 1898–1899 | 3 | 0 | 4 | 1 | .100 | 0 |
| 2 | George Sperry | 1919 | 1 | 1 | 4 | 0 | .200 | 0 |
| 3 | Paul McCoy | 1920 | 1 | 1 | 2 | 1 | .333 | 0 |
| 4 | Erwin Righter | 1921–1932 | 12 | 54 | 34 | 4 | .609 | 0 |
| 5 | Amos Alonzo Stagg | 1933–1946 | 14 | 60 | 77 | 7 | .441 | 1 |
| 6 | Larry Siemering | 1947–1950 | 4 | 35 | 5 | 3 | .849 | 2 |
| 7 | Ernie Jorge | 1951–1952 | 2 | 13 | 8 | 1 | .614 | 2 |
| 8 | Jack Myers | 1953–1960 | 8 | 39 | 33 | 5 | .539 | 0 |
| 9 | John Rohde | 1961–1963 | 3 | 12 | 17 | 0 | .414 | 0 |
| 10 | Don Campora | 1964–1965 | 2 | 3 | 17 | 0 | .150 | 0 |
| 11 | Doug Scovil | 1966–1969 | 4 | 21 | 19 | 0 | .525 | 0 |
| 12 | Homer Smith | 1970–1971 | 2 | 8 | 14 | 0 | .364 | 0 |
| 13 | Chester Caddas | 1972–1978 | 7 | 38 | 38 | 2 | .500 | 0 |
| 14 | Bob Toledo | 1979–1982 | 4 | 14 | 30 | 0 | .318 | 0 |
| 15 | Bob Cope | 1983–1988 | 6 | 22 | 46 | 0 | .324 | 0 |
| 16 | Walt Harris | 1989–1991 | 3 | 11 | 24 | 0 | .314 | 0 |
| 17 | Chuck Shelton | 1992–1995 | 4 | 15 | 29 | 0 | .341 | 0 |
| | Totals | 1895–1995 | 80 | 347 | 401 | 24 | .465 | 5 |
