= Pete Ankney =

American football coach (born c. 1932)

Biographical details
- Born: December 30, 1931; Dayton, Ohio, U.S.
- Died: September 27, 2020 (aged 88); Englewood, Florida, U.S.

Coaching career (HC unless noted)
- 1958: Fairmont HS (OH) (assistant)
- 1959–1960: Fairmont HS (OH)
- 1961–1962: Canton McKinley HS (OH)
- 1963–1964: Dayton

Head coaching record
- Overall: 4–14–2 (college)

William T. "Pete" Ankney (December 30, 1931 – September 27, 2020) was an American former football coach. He served as the head football coach at the University of Dayton from 1963 to 1964, and complied a record of 4–14–2. Before he was hired at Dayton in December 1962, Ankney coached high school football in the state of Ohio, at Fairmont High School in Kettering and Canton McKinley High School in Canton.

Ankney was the uncle of former Bowling Green State University head football coach Moe Ankney.

== Head coaching record ==
=== College ===
Year	Team	Overall	Conference	Standing	Bowl/playoffs
Dayton Flyers (NCAA University Division independent) (1963–1964)
1963	Dayton	1–7–2			
1964	Dayton	3–7			
Dayton:		4–14–2			
Total:		4–14–2			
