= Warren Harper =

American football coach

Biographical details
- Born: c. 1932
- Died: July 24, 1997 (aged 65); Norman, Oklahoma, U.S.

Coaching career (HC unless noted)
- 1961: Sherman HS (TX)
- 1963–1964: Texas Western
- 1965–1967: Amarillo HS (TX)
- 1968–1982: Oklahoma (LB)

Administrative career (AD unless noted)
- 1983–1994: Seattle Seahawks (scout)

Head coaching record
- Overall: 3–15–2 (college)

Warren Harper (c. 1932 – July 24, 1997) was an American football coach. He served as the head football coach at Texas Western College—now the University of Texas at El Paso (UTEP)—from 1963 to 1964, compiling a record of 3–15–2.

Harper graduated from O'Keefe High School in Atlanta, Georgia before moving on to play at Copiah Lincoln Community College. From there, Harper transferred to Austin College where he was chosen to the All-Texas Conference team in 1953 as a quarterback.

Upon graduation, Harper served as an assistant coach for several Texas high schools. He started at Victoria High School, moved to Orange High School, then to Sherman High School, and finally Amarillo High School. In 1961, he was hired back at Sherman as the head coach at a yearly salary of $7,038. The team posted a 7–2–1 record despite being picked to finish in last place in the district. Shortly after the season, Sherman quit to become an assistant at Texas Western.

After one season as the top assistant, Harper was named head coach after Bum Phillips resigned. Harper was never able to achieve much success and after a winless 2nd second season, announced his resignation shortly before the team's final game. He had wanted to announce it after the season, but the information leaked to the press so he informed his team during the pre-game meeting.

Harper was then hired back at Amarillo High School, this time as the head coach with a salary of $9,200. In 1967, Harper was named Coach of the Year after his team posted a 10–0 regular season record before losing in the playoffs. In three seasons at Amarillo, he posted a record of 24–6–1.

He was an assistant at the University of Oklahoma from 1968 to 1982, where he coached linebackers such as Rod Shoate, George Cumby, and Daryl Hunt.

== Head coaching record ==
=== College ===
Year	Team	Overall	Bowl/playoffs
Texas Western Miners (NCAA University Division independent) (1963–1964)
1963	Texas Western	3–7	
1964	Texas Western	0–8–2	
Texas Western:		3–15–2	
Total:		3–15–2	
