= 1963 Syracuse Orangemen football team =

American college football season

1963 Syracuse Orangemen football
- Conference: Independent

Ranking
- Coaches: No. 12
- Record: 8–2
- Head coach: Ben Schwartzwalder (15th season)
- Captain: Richard Bowman & James Mazurek
- Home stadium: Archbold Stadium

1963 NCAA University Division independents football records
	Conf.			Overall
Team	W	L	T	W		L		T
No. 14 Memphis State		–		9	–	0	–	1
No. 3 Pittsburgh		–		9	–	1	–	0
No. 2 Navy		–		9	–	2	–	0
No. 12 Syracuse		–		8	–	2	–	0
Utah State		–		8	–	2	–	0
Oregon		–		8	–	3	–	0
No. 16 Penn State		–		7	–	3	–	0
Army		–		7	–	3	–	0
Air Force		–		7	–	4	–	0
Boston College		–		6	–	3	–	0
Buffalo		–		5	–	3	–	1
Southern Miss		–		5	–	3	–	1
Villanova		–		5	–	4	–	0
Oregon State		–		5	–	5	–	0
San Jose State		–		5	–	5	–	0
Xavier		–		5	–	4	–	1
West Texas State		–		4	–	4	–	1
Florida State		–		4	–	5	–	1
Colgate		–		3	–	4	–	1
New Mexico State		–		3	–	6	–	1
Colorado State		–		3	–	7	–	0
Miami (FL)		–		3	–	7	–	0
Texas Western		–		3	–	7	–	0
Detroit		–		2	–	6	–	1
Holy Cross		–		2	–	6	–	1
Notre Dame		–		2	–	7	–	0
Pacific (CA)		–		2	–	8	–	0
Houston		–		2	–	8	–	0
Boston University		–		1	–	6	–	1
Dayton		–		1	–	7	–	2
Rankings from Coaches Poll

The 1963 Syracuse Orangemen football team represented Syracuse University as an independent during the 1963 NCAA University Division football season. The offense scored 255 points while the defense allowed 101 points. Led by head coach Ben Schwartzwalder, the team won eight games. Despite their 8–2 record, they were not invited to a bowl game. Syracuse played in their eighth and final game at Yankee Stadium, on Thanksgiving Day, with the Orangemen defeating Notre Dame, 14–7. This was a rematch following the teams' controversial 1961 game won by Notre Dame, 17–15.

== Schedule ==
Date	Opponent	Rank	Site	Result	Attendance	Source
September 21	Boston College		Archbold Stadium; Syracuse, NY	W 32–21	30,000	
September 28	at Kansas		Memorial Stadium; Lawrence, KS	L 0–10	35,000	
October 5	Holy Cross		Archbold Stadium; Syracuse, NY	W 48–0	22,000	
October 11	at UCLA		Los Angeles Memorial Coliseum; Los Angeles, CA	W 29–7	22,949	
October 19	Penn State		Archbold Stadium; Syracuse, NY (rivalry)	W 9–0	39,687	
October 26	Oregon State	No. 12	Archbold Stadium; Syracuse, NY	W 31–8	30,000	
November 2	at No. 12 Pittsburgh	No. 10	Pitt Stadium; Pittsburgh, PA	L 27–35	44,090	
November 9	West Virginia		Archbold Stadium; Syracuse, NY (rivalry)	W 15–13	22,000	
November 16	Richmond	No. 18	Archbold Stadium; Syracuse, NY	W 50–0	20,000	
November 28	vs. Notre Dame		Yankee Stadium; Bronx, NY	W 14–7	56,972	
Rankings from Coaches' Poll released prior to the game; Source:

== 1964 NFL draft ==
Player	Round	Pick	Position	Club
Jim Mazurek	6	78	Tackle	Baltimore Colts
Dick Bowman	6	80	Guard	St. Louis Cardinals
John Paglio	11	148	Tackle	Baltimore Colts
Bob Meehan	13	179	Guard	Cleveland Browns
Len Slaby	14	192	Center	St. Louis Cardinals
Dave Archer	20	278	Tackle	Cleveland Browns
