= 1963 Notre Dame Fighting Irish football team =

American college football season

1963 Notre Dame Fighting Irish football
- Conference: Independent
- Record: 2–7
- Head coach: Hugh Devore (2nd season)
- Captain: Bob Lehmann
- Home stadium: Notre Dame Stadium

1963 NCAA University Division independents football records
	Conf.			Overall
Team	W	L	T	W		L		T
No. 14 Memphis State		–		9	–	0	–	1
No. 3 Pittsburgh		–		9	–	1	–	0
No. 2 Navy		–		9	–	2	–	0
No. 12 Syracuse		–		8	–	2	–	0
Utah State		–		8	–	2	–	0
Oregon		–		8	–	3	–	0
No. 16 Penn State		–		7	–	3	–	0
Army		–		7	–	3	–	0
Air Force		–		7	–	4	–	0
Boston College		–		6	–	3	–	0
Buffalo		–		5	–	3	–	1
Southern Miss		–		5	–	3	–	1
Villanova		–		5	–	4	–	0
Oregon State		–		5	–	5	–	0
San Jose State		–		5	–	5	–	0
Xavier		–		5	–	4	–	1
West Texas State		–		4	–	4	–	1
Florida State		–		4	–	5	–	1
Colgate		–		3	–	4	–	1
New Mexico State		–		3	–	6	–	1
Colorado State		–		3	–	7	–	0
Miami (FL)		–		3	–	7	–	0
Texas Western		–		3	–	7	–	0
Detroit		–		2	–	6	–	1
Holy Cross		–		2	–	6	–	1
Notre Dame		–		2	–	7	–	0
Pacific (CA)		–		2	–	8	–	0
Houston		–		2	–	8	–	0
Boston University		–		1	–	6	–	1
Dayton		–		1	–	7	–	2
Rankings from Coaches Poll

The 1963 Notre Dame Fighting Irish football team was an American football team that represented the University of Notre Dame as an independent during the 1963 NCAA University Division football season. Hugh Devore served as interim head coach for the 1963 season following the resignation of Joe Kuharich. Devore had previously stepped in as head coach in 1945 while Frank Leahy completed his military service. The 1963 Notre Dame team compiled a 2–7 record and were outscored by a total of 159 to 108. In five games against ranked opponents, they defeated No. 7 USC and lost to No. 6 Wisconsin, No. 4 Navy, No. 8 Pitt, and No. 4 Michigan State. A tenth game against Iowa was cancelled due to the assassination of John F. Kennedy.

End Jim Kelly received first-team honors from the American Football Coaches Association and the United Press International on the 1963 All-America college football team. The team's statistical leaders included quarterbacks John Huarte (243 passing yards) and Frank Budka (239 passing yards, 24 points scored), Joe Kantor (330 rushing yards), and Kelly (264 receiving yards).

In December 1963, Devore's position as interim head coach ended, as Notre Dame hired Ara Parseghian as its new head coach.

The team played its home games at Notre Dame Stadium in Notre Dame, Indiana.

== Schedule ==
Date	Opponent	Site	Result	Attendance	Source
September 28	No. 6 Wisconsin	Notre Dame Stadium; Notre Dame, IN	L 9–14	56,806	
October 5	at Purdue	Ross–Ade Stadium; West Lafayette, IN (rivalry)	L 6–7	51,723	
October 12	No. 7 USC	Notre Dame Stadium; Notre Dame, IN (rivalry)	W 17–14	59,135	
October 19	UCLA	Notre Dame Stadium; Notre Dame, IN	W 27–12	42,948	
October 26	at Stanford	Stanford Stadium; Stanford, CA (rivalry)	L 14–24	55,000	
November 2	No. 4 Navy	Notre Dame Stadium; Notre Dame, IN (rivalry)	L 14–35	59,362	
November 9	No. 8 Pittsburgh	Notre Dame Stadium; Notre Dame, IN (rivalry)	L 7–27	41,306	
November 16	at No. 4 Michigan State	Spartan Stadium; East Lansing, MI (rivalry)	L 7–12	70,128	
November 23	at Iowa	Iowa Stadium; Iowa City, IA (cancelled due to the assassination of President Kennedy)			
November 28	vs. Syracuse	Yankee Stadium; Bronx, NY (Thanksgiving)	L 7–14	56,972	
Rankings from AP Poll released prior to the game; Source:

== Personnel ==
1963 Notre Dame Fighting Irish football team roster
Players
Coaches
Offense

Pos.	#	Name	Class
HB		John Atamian	Jr
G		Jim Carroll	Jr
QB		John Huarte	Jr
HB		Jack Snow	Jr

Defense

Pos.	#	Name	Class

Special teams

Pos.	#	Name	Class

Head coach

- Hugh Devore

Coordinators/assistant coaches

Legend

- (C) Team captain
- (S) Suspended
- (I) Ineligible
- Injured
- Redshirt

== Team players drafted into the NFL ==
Player	Position	Round	NFL club
Jim Kelly	TE	2	Pittsburgh Steelers
Paul Costa	TE	4	Green Bay Packers
Frank Budka	DB	4	Chicago Bears
Jim Snowden	Tackle	5	Washington Redskins
George Bednar	Guard	8	St. Louis Cardinals
Tom MacDonald	Back	13	Washington Redskins
Dave Humenik	Tackle	17	New York Giants
