= 1963 Boston University Terriers football team =

American college football season

1963 Boston University Terriers football
- Conference: Independent
- Record: 1–6–1
- Head coach: Steve Sinko (7th season)
- Home stadium: Nickerson Field

1963 NCAA University Division independents football records
| | Conf. | | | Overall |
| Team | W | L | T | W | | L | | T |
|---|---|---|---|---|---|---|---|---|
| No. 14 Memphis State | | – | | 9 | – | 0 | – | 1 |
| No. 3 Pittsburgh | | – | | 9 | – | 1 | – | 0 |
| No. 2 Navy | | – | | 9 | – | 2 | – | 0 |
| No. 12 Syracuse | | – | | 8 | – | 2 | – | 0 |
| Utah State | | – | | 8 | – | 2 | – | 0 |
| Oregon | | – | | 8 | – | 3 | – | 0 |
| No. 16 Penn State | | – | | 7 | – | 3 | – | 0 |
| Army | | – | | 7 | – | 3 | – | 0 |
| Air Force | | – | | 7 | – | 4 | – | 0 |
| Boston College | | – | | 6 | – | 3 | – | 0 |
| Buffalo | | – | | 5 | – | 3 | – | 1 |
| Southern Miss | | – | | 5 | – | 3 | – | 1 |
| Villanova | | – | | 5 | – | 4 | – | 0 |
| Oregon State | | – | | 5 | – | 5 | – | 0 |
| San Jose State | | – | | 5 | – | 5 | – | 0 |
| Xavier | | – | | 5 | – | 4 | – | 1 |
| West Texas State | | – | | 4 | – | 4 | – | 1 |
| Florida State | | – | | 4 | – | 5 | – | 1 |
| Colgate | | – | | 3 | – | 4 | – | 1 |
| New Mexico State | | – | | 3 | – | 6 | – | 1 |
| Colorado State | | – | | 3 | – | 7 | – | 0 |
| Miami (FL) | | – | | 3 | – | 7 | – | 0 |
| Texas Western | | – | | 3 | – | 7 | – | 0 |
| Detroit | | – | | 2 | – | 6 | – | 1 |
| Holy Cross | | – | | 2 | – | 6 | – | 1 |
| Notre Dame | | – | | 2 | – | 7 | – | 0 |
| Pacific (CA) | | – | | 2 | – | 8 | – | 0 |
| Houston | | – | | 2 | – | 8 | – | 0 |
| Boston University | | – | | 1 | – | 6 | – | 1 |
| Dayton | | – | | 1 | – | 7 | – | 2 |
Rankings from Coaches Poll

The 1963 Boston University Terriers football team was an American football team that represented Boston University as an independent during the 1963 NCAA University Division football season. In its seventh and final season under head coach Steve Sinko, the team compiled a 1–6–1 record and was outscored by a total of 162 to 43.

== Schedule ==
| Date | Opponent | Site | Result | Attendance | Source |
|---|---|---|---|---|---|
| September 21 | at Army | Michie Stadium; West Point, NY | L 0–30 | 18,150 | |
| September 28 | West Virginia | Nickerson Field; Boston, MA | L 0–34 | 7,000 | |
| October 5 | Colgate | Nickerson Field; Boston, MA | T 6–6 | 7,000 | |
| October 12 | at Holy Cross | Fitton Field; Worcester, MA | W 18–6 | 14,000 | |
| October 19 | at Buffalo | Rotary Field; Buffalo, NY | L 13–22 | 11,466 | |
| October 26 | UMass | Nickerson Field; Boston, MA | L 0–21 | 12,000 | |
| November 2 | at Rutgers | Rutgers Stadium; Piscataway, NJ | L 6–21 | 12,000 | |
| November 9 | Connecticut | Nickerson Field; Boston, MA | L 0–22 | 1,500 | |
| November 23 | at Boston College | Fenway Park; Boston, MA (rivalry) | Cancelled | | |
