= 1963 Boston College Eagles football team =

American college football season

1963 Boston College Eagles football
- Conference: Independent
- Record: 6–3
- Head coach: Jim Miller (2nd season)
- Captain: Joe Lukis
- Home stadium: Alumni Stadium

1963 NCAA University Division independents football records
	Conf.			Overall
Team	W	L	T	W		L		T
No. 14 Memphis State		–		9	–	0	–	1
No. 3 Pittsburgh		–		9	–	1	–	0
No. 2 Navy		–		9	–	2	–	0
No. 12 Syracuse		–		8	–	2	–	0
Utah State		–		8	–	2	–	0
Oregon		–		8	–	3	–	0
No. 16 Penn State		–		7	–	3	–	0
Army		–		7	–	3	–	0
Air Force		–		7	–	4	–	0
Boston College		–		6	–	3	–	0
Buffalo		–		5	–	3	–	1
Southern Miss		–		5	–	3	–	1
Villanova		–		5	–	4	–	0
Oregon State		–		5	–	5	–	0
San Jose State		–		5	–	5	–	0
Xavier		–		5	–	4	–	1
West Texas State		–		4	–	4	–	1
Florida State		–		4	–	5	–	1
Colgate		–		3	–	4	–	1
New Mexico State		–		3	–	6	–	1
Colorado State		–		3	–	7	–	0
Miami (FL)		–		3	–	7	–	0
Texas Western		–		3	–	7	–	0
Detroit		–		2	–	6	–	1
Holy Cross		–		2	–	6	–	1
Notre Dame		–		2	–	7	–	0
Pacific (CA)		–		2	–	8	–	0
Houston		–		2	–	8	–	0
Boston University		–		1	–	6	–	1
Dayton		–		1	–	7	–	2
Rankings from Coaches Poll

The 1963 Boston College Eagles football team represented Boston College as an independent during the 1963 NCAA University Division football season. Led by second-year head coach Jim Miller, the Eagles compiled a record of 6–3. Boston College played home games at Alumni Stadium in Chestnut Hill, Massachusetts. A historical note: The game slated to be played at Fenway Park on November 23 between BC and 196Boston University was cancelled because of the assassination of John F. Kennedy on the Friday before the scheduled game.

== Schedule ==
Date	Opponent	Site	Result	Attendance	Source
September 21	at Syracuse	Archbold Stadium; Syracuse, NY	L 21–32	30,000	
September 28	Wichita	Alumni Stadium; Chestnut Hill, MA	W 22–16	22,000	
October 4	at Detroit	University of Detroit Stadium; Detroit, MI	W 20–12	16,460	
October 12	Villanova	Alumni Stadium; Chestnut Hill, MA	W 34–0	23,500	
October 26	at Air Force	Falcon Stadium; Colorado Springs, CO	L 7–34	30,144	
November 2	Vanderbilt	Alumni Stadium; Chestnut Hill, MA	W 19–6	17,700	
November 9	Buffalo	Alumni Stadium; Chestnut Hill, MA	W 15–0	13,650	
November 16	Virginia	Alumni Stadium; Chestnut Hill, MA	W 30–21	20,200	
November 23	Boston University	Fenway Park; Boston, MA (rivalry)	Cancelled		
November 30	at Holy Cross	Fitton Field; Worcester, MA (rivalry)	L 0–9	25,000	
