= 1963 Xavier Musketeers football team =

American college football season

1963 Xavier Musketeers football
- Conference: Independent
- Record: 5–4–1
- Head coach: Ed Biles (2nd season)
- Home stadium: Xavier Stadium

1963 NCAA University Division independents football records
	Conf.			Overall
Team	W	L	T	W		L		T
No. 14 Memphis State		–		9	–	0	–	1
No. 3 Pittsburgh		–		9	–	1	–	0
No. 2 Navy		–		9	–	2	–	0
No. 12 Syracuse		–		8	–	2	–	0
Utah State		–		8	–	2	–	0
Oregon		–		8	–	3	–	0
No. 16 Penn State		–		7	–	3	–	0
Army		–		7	–	3	–	0
Air Force		–		7	–	4	–	0
Boston College		–		6	–	3	–	0
Buffalo		–		5	–	3	–	1
Southern Miss		–		5	–	3	–	1
Villanova		–		5	–	4	–	0
Oregon State		–		5	–	5	–	0
San Jose State		–		5	–	5	–	0
Xavier		–		5	–	4	–	1
West Texas State		–		4	–	4	–	1
Florida State		–		4	–	5	–	1
Colgate		–		3	–	4	–	1
New Mexico State		–		3	–	6	–	1
Colorado State		–		3	–	7	–	0
Miami (FL)		–		3	–	7	–	0
Texas Western		–		3	–	7	–	0
Detroit		–		2	–	6	–	1
Holy Cross		–		2	–	6	–	1
Notre Dame		–		2	–	7	–	0
Pacific (CA)		–		2	–	8	–	0
Houston		–		2	–	8	–	0
Boston University		–		1	–	6	–	1
Dayton		–		1	–	7	–	2
Rankings from Coaches Poll

The 1963 Xavier Musketeers football team was an American football team that represented Xavier University as an independent during the 1963 NCAA University Division football season. In their second year under head coach Ed Biles, the Musketeers compiled a 5–4–1 record.

== Schedule ==
Date	Opponent	Site	Result	Attendance	Source
September 14	Quantico Marines	Xavier Stadium; Cincinnati, OH	L 7–9	12,106	
September 21	at Miami (OH)	Miami Field; Oxford, OH	W 21–12	10,457	
September 28	Kent State	Xavier Stadium; Cincinnati, OH	T 7–7	7,844	
October 5	at Cincinnati	Nippert Stadium; Cincinnati, OH (rivalry)	L 22–35	25,000–25,500	
October 19	at Dayton	Baujan Field; Dayton, OH	W 15–14		
October 26	Villanova	Xavier Stadium; Cincinnati, OH	W 27–0	7,884	
November 2	Ohio^{†}	Xavier Stadium; Cincinnati, OH	W 20–0	9,271–9,297	
November 9	Texas Western	Xavier Stadium; Cincinnati, OH	W 24–0	8,281	
November 15	at Detroit	University of Detroit Stadium; Detroit, MI	L 0–6		
November 23	at Bowling Green	University Stadium; Bowling Green, OH	L 15–26	5,119	
^{†}Homecoming
