= 1963 Villanova Wildcats football team =

American college football season

1963 Villanova Wildcats football
- Conference: Independent
- Record: 5–4
- Head coach: Alexander F. Bell (4th season)
- Captain: Jim Thomas
- Home stadium: Villanova Stadium

1963 NCAA University Division independents football records
	Conf.			Overall
Team	W	L	T	W		L		T
No. 14 Memphis State		–		9	–	0	–	1
No. 3 Pittsburgh		–		9	–	1	–	0
No. 2 Navy		–		9	–	2	–	0
No. 12 Syracuse		–		8	–	2	–	0
Utah State		–		8	–	2	–	0
Oregon		–		8	–	3	–	0
No. 16 Penn State		–		7	–	3	–	0
Army		–		7	–	3	–	0
Air Force		–		7	–	4	–	0
Boston College		–		6	–	3	–	0
Buffalo		–		5	–	3	–	1
Southern Miss		–		5	–	3	–	1
Villanova		–		5	–	4	–	0
Oregon State		–		5	–	5	–	0
San Jose State		–		5	–	5	–	0
Xavier		–		5	–	4	–	1
West Texas State		–		4	–	4	–	1
Florida State		–		4	–	5	–	1
Colgate		–		3	–	4	–	1
New Mexico State		–		3	–	6	–	1
Colorado State		–		3	–	7	–	0
Miami (FL)		–		3	–	7	–	0
Texas Western		–		3	–	7	–	0
Detroit		–		2	–	6	–	1
Holy Cross		–		2	–	6	–	1
Notre Dame		–		2	–	7	–	0
Pacific (CA)		–		2	–	8	–	0
Houston		–		2	–	8	–	0
Boston University		–		1	–	6	–	1
Dayton		–		1	–	7	–	2
Rankings from Coaches Poll

The 1963 Villanova Wildcats football team represented the Villanova University during the 1963 NCAA University Division football season. The head coach was Alexander F. Bell, coaching his fourth season with the Wildcats. The team played their home games at Villanova Stadium in Villanova, Pennsylvania.

== Schedule ==
Date	Opponent	Site	Result	Attendance	Source
September 21	West Chester*	Villanova Stadium; Villanova, PA	W 21–9	11,000	
September 28	at Toledo	Glass Bowl; Toledo, OH	W 18–14	14,200	
October 5	Buffalo	Villanova Stadium; Villanova, PA	L 7–14	12,500	
October 12	at Boston College	Alumni Stadium; Chestnut Hill, MA	L 0–34	23,500	
October 19	George Washington	Villanova Stadium; Villanova, PA	W 14–13	11,000	
October 26	at Xavier	Xavier Stadium; Cincinnati, OH	L 0–27	7,884	
November 2	Holy Cross	Villanova Stadium; Villanova, PA	W 22–14	10,000	
November 8	at Detroit	University of Detroit Stadium; Detroit, MI	W 28–14	16,763	
November 16	Quantico Marines*	Villanova Stadium; Villanova, PA	L 0–16	11,200	
*Non-conference game; Source:
