= 1962 California Golden Bears football team =

American college football season

1962 California Golden Bears football
- Conference: Athletic Association of Western Universities
- Record: 1–9 (0–4 AAWU)
- Head coach: Marv Levy (3rd season)
- Home stadium: California Memorial Stadium

1962 Athletic Association of Western Universities football standings
	Conf.					Overall
Team	W		L		T	W		L		T
No. 1 USC $	4	–	0	–	0	11	–	0	–	0
Washington	4	–	1	–	0	7	–	1	–	2
Washington State	1	–	1	–	0	5	–	4	–	1
Stanford	2	–	3	–	0	5	–	5	–	0
UCLA	1	–	3	–	0	4	–	6	–	0
California	0	–	4	–	0	1	–	9	–	0
$ – Conference champion; Rankings from AP Poll

The 1962 California Golden Bears football team was an American football team that represented the University of California, Berkeley in the Athletic Association of Western Universities (AAWU) during the 1962 NCAA University Division football season. In its fourth year under head coach Marv Levy, the Golden Bears compiled a 1–9 record (0–4 in AAWU, last) and were outscored 247 to 143. Home games were played on campus at California Memorial Stadium in Berkeley, California.

California's statistical leaders on offense were sophomore quarterback Craig Morton with 905 passing yards, Alan Nelson with 334 rushing yards, and Bill Turner with 537 receiving yards. Morton was later inducted into the College Football Hall of Fame.

== Schedule ==
Date	Opponent	Site	Result	Attendance	Source
September 22	Missouri*	California Memorial Stadium; Berkeley, CA	L 10–21	36,500	
September 29	San Jose State*	California Memorial Stadium; Berkeley, CA	W 25–8	31,500	
October 6	Pittsburgh*	California Memorial Stadium; Berkeley, CA	L 24–26	27,000	
October 13	at Duke*	Wallace Wade Stadium; Durham, NC	L 7–21	31,000	
October 20	at No. 3 USC	Los Angeles Memorial Coliseum; Los Angeles, CA	L 6–32	38,500	
October 27	Penn State*	California Memorial Stadium; Berkeley, CA	L 21–23	31,500	
November 3	UCLA	California Memorial Stadium; Berkeley, CA (rivalry)	L 16–26	43,600	
November 10	at Washington	Husky Stadium; Seattle, WA	L 0–27	54,800	
November 17	at Kansas*	Memorial Stadium; Lawrence, KS	L 21–33	32,000	
November 24	Stanford	California Memorial Stadium; Berkeley, CA (Big Game)	L 13–30	72,700	
*Non-conference game; Rankings from AP Poll released prior to the game; Source:

== Roster ==
1962 California Golden Bears football team roster
Players			Coaches
Offense: Pos. / # / Name / Class; QB / / Craig Morton / So	Defense: Pos. / # / Name / Class	Special teams: Pos. / # / Name / Class	Head coach: Marv Levy; Coordinators/assistant coaches Legend: (C) Team captain; (S) Suspended; (I) Ineligible; Injured; Redshirt
