= 1963 Detroit Titans football team =

American college football season

1963 Detroit Titans football
- Conference: Independent
- Record: 2–6–1
- Head coach: John Idzik (2nd season)
- Home stadium: University of Detroit Stadium

1963 NCAA University Division independents football records
	Conf.			Overall
Team	W	L	T	W		L		T
No. 14 Memphis State		–		9	–	0	–	1
No. 3 Pittsburgh		–		9	–	1	–	0
No. 2 Navy		–		9	–	2	–	0
No. 12 Syracuse		–		8	–	2	–	0
Utah State		–		8	–	2	–	0
Oregon		–		8	–	3	–	0
No. 16 Penn State		–		7	–	3	–	0
Army		–		7	–	3	–	0
Air Force		–		7	–	4	–	0
Boston College		–		6	–	3	–	0
Buffalo		–		5	–	3	–	1
Southern Miss		–		5	–	3	–	1
Villanova		–		5	–	4	–	0
Oregon State		–		5	–	5	–	0
San Jose State		–		5	–	5	–	0
Xavier		–		5	–	4	–	1
West Texas State		–		4	–	4	–	1
Florida State		–		4	–	5	–	1
Colgate		–		3	–	4	–	1
New Mexico State		–		3	–	6	–	1
Colorado State		–		3	–	7	–	0
Miami (FL)		–		3	–	7	–	0
Texas Western		–		3	–	7	–	0
Detroit		–		2	–	6	–	1
Holy Cross		–		2	–	6	–	1
Notre Dame		–		2	–	7	–	0
Pacific (CA)		–		2	–	8	–	0
Houston		–		2	–	8	–	0
Boston University		–		1	–	6	–	1
Dayton		–		1	–	7	–	2
Rankings from Coaches Poll

The 1963 Detroit Titans football team represented the University of Detroit as an independent during the 1963 NCAA University Division football season. In their second year under head coach John Idzik, the Titans compiled a 2–6–1 record and were outscored by opponents by a combined total of 221 to 116.

The team's statistical leaders included Tom Zientek with 574 passing yards, Fred Beier with 766 rushing yards and 48 points scored, and George Walkosky with 135 receiving yards.

== Schedule ==
Date	Opponent	Site	Result	Attendance	Source
September 21	at Bowling Green	University Stadium; Bowling Green, OH	L 14–27		
September 27	Northern Michigan	University of Detroit Stadium; Detroit, MI	W 20–7	14,757	
October 4	Boston College	University of Detroit Stadium; Detroit, MI	L 12–20	16,460	
October 12	at Kentucky	Stoll Field/McLean Stadium; Lexington, KY	L 18–35	26,000	
October 19	at Cincinnati	Nippert Stadium; Cincinnati, OH	L 0–35	16,000–16,500	
October 26	at Dayton	Baujan Field; Dayton, OH	T 14–14	13,200	
November 2	at Houston	Rice Stadium; Houston, TX	L 18–55	15,000	
November 8	Villanova	University of Detroit Stadium; Detroit, MI	L 14–28	16,763	
November 15	Xavier	University of Detroit Stadium; Detroit, MI	W 6–0		
November 23	at Toledo	Glass Bowl; Toledo, OH	Cancelled		
