= 1963 Oregon State Beavers football team =

American college football season

1963 Oregon State Beavers football
- Conference: Independent
- Record: 5–5
- Head coach: Tommy Prothro (9th season)
- Home stadium: Parker Stadium; Multnomah Stadium

1963 NCAA University Division independents football records
	Conf.			Overall
Team	W	L	T	W		L		T
No. 14 Memphis State		–		9	–	0	–	1
No. 3 Pittsburgh		–		9	–	1	–	0
No. 2 Navy		–		9	–	2	–	0
No. 12 Syracuse		–		8	–	2	–	0
Utah State		–		8	–	2	–	0
Oregon		–		8	–	3	–	0
No. 16 Penn State		–		7	–	3	–	0
Army		–		7	–	3	–	0
Air Force		–		7	–	4	–	0
Boston College		–		6	–	3	–	0
Buffalo		–		5	–	3	–	1
Southern Miss		–		5	–	3	–	1
Villanova		–		5	–	4	–	0
Oregon State		–		5	–	5	–	0
San Jose State		–		5	–	5	–	0
Xavier		–		5	–	4	–	1
West Texas State		–		4	–	4	–	1
Florida State		–		4	–	5	–	1
Colgate		–		3	–	4	–	1
New Mexico State		–		3	–	6	–	1
Colorado State		–		3	–	7	–	0
Miami (FL)		–		3	–	7	–	0
Texas Western		–		3	–	7	–	0
Detroit		–		2	–	6	–	1
Holy Cross		–		2	–	6	–	1
Notre Dame		–		2	–	7	–	0
Pacific (CA)		–		2	–	8	–	0
Houston		–		2	–	8	–	0
Boston University		–		1	–	6	–	1
Dayton		–		1	–	7	–	2
Rankings from Coaches Poll

The 1963 Oregon State Beavers football team represented Oregon State University as an independent during the 1963 NCAA University Division football season In their ninth season under head coach Tommy Prothro, the Beavers compiled a 5–5 record and were outscored 198 to 192. The team played two home games on campus at Parker Stadium in Corvallis, and two at Multnomah Stadium in Portland.

== Schedule ==
Date	Opponent	Site	Result	Attendance	Source
September 21	at Utah	Ute Stadium; Salt Lake City, UT	W 29–14	17,381	
September 28	Colorado	Multnomah Stadium; Portland, OR	W 41–6	18,721	
October 5	Baylor	Multnomah Stadium; Portland, OR	W 22–15	24,342	
October 12	at Washington	Husky Stadium; Seattle, WA	L 7–34	53,700	
October 19	Washington State^{†}	Parker Stadium; Corvallis, OR	W 30–6	17,810	
October 26	at Syracuse	Archbold Stadium; Syracuse, NY	L 8–31	30,000	
November 2	Stanford	Parker Stadium; Corvallis, OR	W 10–7	17,697	
November 9	at Indiana	Memorial Stadium; Bloomington, IN	L 15–20	25,895	
November 15	at USC	Los Angeles Memorial Coliseum; Los Angeles, CA	L 22–28	30,846	
November 30	at Oregon	Hayward Field; Eugene, OR (Civil War)	L 14–31	20,700	
^{†}Homecoming; Source:

== Roster ==
- E Vern Burke, Sr.
- OL Rich Koeper, Jr.
- QB Gordon Queen
