= 1963 West Texas State Buffaloes football team =

American college football season

1963 West Texas State Buffaloes football
- Conference: Independent
- Record: 4–4–1
- Head coach: Joe Kerbel (4th season)
- Home stadium: Buffalo Bowl

1963 NCAA University Division independents football records
	Conf.			Overall
Team	W	L	T	W		L		T
No. 14 Memphis State		–		9	–	0	–	1
No. 3 Pittsburgh		–		9	–	1	–	0
No. 2 Navy		–		9	–	2	–	0
No. 12 Syracuse		–		8	–	2	–	0
Utah State		–		8	–	2	–	0
Oregon		–		8	–	3	–	0
No. 16 Penn State		–		7	–	3	–	0
Army		–		7	–	3	–	0
Air Force		–		7	–	4	–	0
Boston College		–		6	–	3	–	0
Buffalo		–		5	–	3	–	1
Southern Miss		–		5	–	3	–	1
Villanova		–		5	–	4	–	0
Oregon State		–		5	–	5	–	0
San Jose State		–		5	–	5	–	0
Xavier		–		5	–	4	–	1
West Texas State		–		4	–	4	–	1
Florida State		–		4	–	5	–	1
Colgate		–		3	–	4	–	1
New Mexico State		–		3	–	6	–	1
Colorado State		–		3	–	7	–	0
Miami (FL)		–		3	–	7	–	0
Texas Western		–		3	–	7	–	0
Detroit		–		2	–	6	–	1
Holy Cross		–		2	–	6	–	1
Notre Dame		–		2	–	7	–	0
Pacific (CA)		–		2	–	8	–	0
Houston		–		2	–	8	–	0
Boston University		–		1	–	6	–	1
Dayton		–		1	–	7	–	2
Rankings from Coaches Poll

The 1963 West Texas State Buffaloes football team was an American football team that represented West Texas State College (now known as West Texas A&M University) as an independent during the 1963 NCAA University Division football season. In their fourth year under head coach Joe Kerbel, the Buffaloes compiled a 4–4–1 record and outscored opponents by a total of 173 to 139.

The Buffaloes gained 2,498 yards of total offense consisting of 1,775 rushing yards and 723 passing yards. On defense, they gave up 2,288 yards of total offense consisting of 1,372 rushing yards and 916 passing yards. Senior fullback Ollie "Hoss" Ross led the team in rushing (364 yards), scoring (50 points on five touchdowns, four field goals, and eight extra-points), punting (47 punts, 35.0-yard average), and pass interceptions (six). Halfback Jerry "Sticks" Richardson led the team in receiving with 18 catches for 246 yards.

Prior to the season, the 1963 team had been rated as "one of, if not, the greatest teams to ever be fielded by West Texas." The team sustained multiple injuries to key players. Halfback "Pistol Pete" Pedro, who had "placed West Texas on the nation's football map" with his performance in 1962, suffered a season-ending injury on October 5 against North Texas State. The Buffaloes also lost their first- and second-string quarterbacks David "Hoot" Gibson and Bill Bundy. At the end of the season, John Shields of The Canyon News called 1963 "the nightmarish, frustrating, injury-marred season."

West Texas State played its home games at Buffalo Bowl in Canyon, Texas.

== Schedule ==
Date	Opponent	Site	Result	Attendance	Source
September 21	Arlington State	Buffalo Bowl; Canyon, TX	W 22–17	15,900–15,945	
September 28	Pacific (CA)	Buffalo Bowl; Canyon, TX	W 32–8	15,932	
October 5	North Texas State	Buffalo Bowl; Canyon, TX	W 38–16	16,235	
October 12	at Arizona State	Sun Devil Stadium; Tempe, AZ	L 16–24	28,815	
October 19	Memphis State	Buffalo Bowl; Canyon, TX	L 14–29	15,230	
October 26	Arizona^{†}	Buffalo Bowl; Canyon, TX	L 3–6	17,376	
November 2	at Trinity (TX)	Alamo Stadium; San Antonio, TX	W 24–2	1,101	
November 9	New Mexico State	Buffalo Bowl; Canyon, TX	T 24–24	11,364	
November 30	at Texas Western	Sun Bowl; El Paso, TX	L 0–13	7,303	
^{†}Homecoming
