= 1962 Stanford Indians football team =

American college football season

1962 Stanford Indians football
- Conference: Athletic Association of Western Universities
- Record: 5–5 (2–3 AAWU)
- Head coach: Jack Curtice (5th season)
- Home stadium: Stanford Stadium

1962 Athletic Association of Western Universities football standings
	Conf.					Overall
Team	W		L		T	W		L		T
No. 1 USC $	4	–	0	–	0	11	–	0	–	0
Washington	4	–	1	–	0	7	–	1	–	2
Washington State	1	–	1	–	0	5	–	4	–	1
Stanford	2	–	3	–	0	5	–	5	–	0
UCLA	1	–	3	–	0	4	–	6	–	0
California	0	–	4	–	0	1	–	9	–	0
$ – Conference champion; Rankings from AP Poll

The 1962 Stanford Indians football team represented Stanford University in the 1962 NCAA University Division football season. Stanford was led by fifth-year head coach Jack Curtice and home games were played on campus at Stanford Stadium in Stanford, California.

Following the season, Curtice was fired after failing to produce a winning season in five years.

== Schedule ==
Date	Opponent	Site	Result	Attendance	Source
September 21	at Tulane*	Tulane Stadium; New Orleans, LA	W 6–3	31,000	
September 29	No. 6 Michigan State*	Stanford Stadium; Stanford, CA	W 16–13	32,500	
October 6	Oregon State*	Stanford Stadium; Stanford, CA	L 0–27	26,500	
October 13	at Washington State	Joe Albi Stadium; Spokane, WA	L 6–21	17,250	
October 20	No. 9 Washington	Stanford Stadium; Stanford, CA	L 0–14	24,000	
October 27	at UCLA	Los Angeles Memorial Coliseum; Los Angeles, CA	W 17–7	33,415	
November 3	at Oregon*	Multnomah Stadium; Portland, OR	L 14–28	29,805	
November 10	No. 2 USC	Stanford Stadium; Stanford, CA (rivalry)	L 14–39	41,000	
November 17	San Jose State*	Stanford Stadium; Stanford, CA (rivalry)	W 21–9	22,500	
November 24	at California	California Memorial Stadium; Berkeley, CA (Big Game)	W 30–13	72,700	
*Non-conference game; Rankings from AP Poll released prior to the game; Source:

== Players drafted by the NFL/AFL ==
Player	Position	Round	Pick	NFL/AFL Club (Note: AFL Draft selections shown in italics.)
Carlton Simons	Center	4	56	Green Bay Packers
Frank Atkinson	Defensive tackle	8	108	Pittsburgh Steelers
Al Hildebrand	Tackle	13/27	169/214	Los Angeles Rams/Houston Oilers
C. B. Simons	Linebacker	24	189	Denver Broncos
