= 1963 Penn State Nittany Lions football team =

American college football season

1963 Penn State Nittany Lions football
- Conference: Independent

Ranking
- Coaches: No. 16
- Record: 7–3
- Head coach: Rip Engle (14th season)
- Captain: Ralph Baker
- Home stadium: Beaver Stadium

1963 NCAA University Division independents football records
	Conf.			Overall
Team	W	L	T	W		L		T
No. 14 Memphis State		–		9	–	0	–	1
No. 3 Pittsburgh		–		9	–	1	–	0
No. 2 Navy		–		9	–	2	–	0
No. 12 Syracuse		–		8	–	2	–	0
Utah State		–		8	–	2	–	0
Oregon		–		8	–	3	–	0
No. 16 Penn State		–		7	–	3	–	0
Army		–		7	–	3	–	0
Air Force		–		7	–	4	–	0
Boston College		–		6	–	3	–	0
Buffalo		–		5	–	3	–	1
Southern Miss		–		5	–	3	–	1
Villanova		–		5	–	4	–	0
Oregon State		–		5	–	5	–	0
San Jose State		–		5	–	5	–	0
Xavier		–		5	–	4	–	1
West Texas State		–		4	–	4	–	1
Florida State		–		4	–	5	–	1
Colgate		–		3	–	4	–	1
New Mexico State		–		3	–	6	–	1
Colorado State		–		3	–	7	–	0
Miami (FL)		–		3	–	7	–	0
Texas Western		–		3	–	7	–	0
Detroit		–		2	–	6	–	1
Holy Cross		–		2	–	6	–	1
Notre Dame		–		2	–	7	–	0
Pacific (CA)		–		2	–	8	–	0
Houston		–		2	–	8	–	0
Boston University		–		1	–	6	–	1
Dayton		–		1	–	7	–	2
Rankings from Coaches Poll

The 1963 Penn State Nittany Lions football team represented Pennsylvania State University as an independent during the 1963 NCAA University Division football season. Led by fourteenth-year head coach Rip Engle, the Nittany Lions were 7–3 and were 16th in the final coaches' poll. Home games were played on campus at Beaver Stadium in University Park; Penn State was independent in football until 1993.

The Nittany Lions were led on the field in 1963 by fifth-year senior quarterback Pete Liske, who had been selected in the NFL and AFL drafts the previous December and went on to play a dozen seasons in pro football. The regular season finale against rival Pittsburgh was postponed two weeks following the assassination of President Kennedy.

Although scoring was off in the 1963 season, the team's defense, headed by 230-pound middle guard (nose tackle in a five man line) Glenn Ressler, was particularly stout, giving up just 92 points in the first 9 games of the season. The Nittany Lions came within a single point of an upset victory over Pitt in the season finale.

== Schedule ==
Date	Opponent	Rank	Site	Result	Attendance	Source
September 21	at Oregon		Multnomah Stadium; Portland, OR	W 17–7	30,355	
September 28	UCLA		Beaver Stadium; University Park, PA	W 17–14	34,800	
October 5	Rice^{†}		Beaver Stadium; University Park, PA	W 28–7	38,200	
October 12	Army	No. 9	Beaver Stadium; University Park, PA	L 7–10	48,850	
October 19	at Syracuse		Archbold Stadium; Syracuse, NY (rivalry)	L 0–9	39,687	
October 26	West Virginia		Beaver Stadium; University Park, PA (rivalry)	W 20–9	45,750	
November 2	at Maryland		Byrd Stadium; College Park, MD (rivalry)	W 17–15	35,500	
November 9	at No. 10 Ohio State		Ohio Stadium; Columbus, OH (rivalry)	W 10–7	83,519	
November 16	Holy Cross		Beaver Stadium; University Park, PA	W 28–14	24,200	
December 7	at No. 4 Pittsburgh		Pitt Stadium; Pittsburgh, PA (rivalry)	L 21–22	52,349	
^{†}Homecoming; Rankings from AP Poll released prior to the game
