= 1963 Memphis State Tigers football team =

American college football season

1963 Memphis State Tigers football
- Conference: Independent

Ranking
- Coaches: No. 14
- Record: 9–0–1
- Head coach: Billy J. Murphy (6th season)
- Captain: Richard Saccoccia
- Home stadium: Crump Stadium

1963 NCAA University Division independents football records
	Conf.			Overall
Team	W	L	T	W		L		T
No. 14 Memphis State		–		9	–	0	–	1
No. 3 Pittsburgh		–		9	–	1	–	0
No. 2 Navy		–		9	–	2	–	0
No. 12 Syracuse		–		8	–	2	–	0
Utah State		–		8	–	2	–	0
Oregon		–		8	–	3	–	0
No. 16 Penn State		–		7	–	3	–	0
Army		–		7	–	3	–	0
Air Force		–		7	–	4	–	0
Boston College		–		6	–	3	–	0
Buffalo		–		5	–	3	–	1
Southern Miss		–		5	–	3	–	1
Villanova		–		5	–	4	–	0
Oregon State		–		5	–	5	–	0
San Jose State		–		5	–	5	–	0
Xavier		–		5	–	4	–	1
West Texas State		–		4	–	4	–	1
Florida State		–		4	–	5	–	1
Colgate		–		3	–	4	–	1
New Mexico State		–		3	–	6	–	1
Colorado State		–		3	–	7	–	0
Miami (FL)		–		3	–	7	–	0
Texas Western		–		3	–	7	–	0
Detroit		–		2	–	6	–	1
Holy Cross		–		2	–	6	–	1
Notre Dame		–		2	–	7	–	0
Pacific (CA)		–		2	–	8	–	0
Houston		–		2	–	8	–	0
Boston University		–		1	–	6	–	1
Dayton		–		1	–	7	–	2
Rankings from Coaches Poll

The 1963 Memphis State Tigers football team represented Memphis State College (now known as the University of Memphis) as an independent during the 1963 NCAA University Division football season. In its sixth season under head coach Billy J. Murphy, the team compiled a 9–0–1 record and outscored opponents by a total of 199 to 52. Richard Saccoccia was the team captain. The team played its home games at Crump Stadium in Memphis, Tennessee.

The team's statistical leaders included Russell Vollmer with 466 passing yards, fullback Dave Casinelli with 1,016 rushing yards and 84 points scored, and Bob Sherlag with 183 receiving yards.

== Schedule ==
Date	Opponent	Site	Result	Attendance	Source
September 14	at Southern Miss^{†}	Mississippi Veterans Memorial Stadium; Jackson, MS (rivalry)	W 28–7	24,000	
September 21	No. 2 Ole Miss	Crump Stadium; Memphis, TN (rivalry)	T 0–0	31,650	
October 5	at Tulsa	Skelly Stadium; Tulsa, OK	W 28–15	12,057	
October 12	North Texas State	Crump Stadium; Memphis, TN	W 21–0	17,031	
October 19	at West Texas State	Buffalo Bowl; Canyon, TX	W 29–14	15,230	
October 26	Mississippi State	Crump Stadium; Memphis, TN	W 17–10	31,650	
November 2	at Louisville	Cardinal Stadium; Louisville, KY (rivalry)	W 25–0	7,869	
November 9	South Carolina	Crump Stadium; Memphis, TN	W 9–0	17,006	
November 16	Chattanooga	Crump Stadium; Memphis, TN	W 13–0	12,884	
November 30	Houston	Crump Stadium; Memphis, TN	W 29–6	13,665	
^{†}Homecoming; Rankings from AP Poll released prior to the game
