= 1963 Miami Hurricanes football team =

American college football season

1963 Miami Hurricanes football
- Conference: Independent
- Record: 3–7
- Head coach: Andy Gustafson (16th season)
- MVP: George Mira
- Home stadium: Miami Orange Bowl

1963 NCAA University Division independents football records
	Conf.			Overall
Team	W	L	T	W		L		T
No. 14 Memphis State		–		9	–	0	–	1
No. 3 Pittsburgh		–		9	–	1	–	0
No. 2 Navy		–		9	–	2	–	0
No. 12 Syracuse		–		8	–	2	–	0
Utah State		–		8	–	2	–	0
Oregon		–		8	–	3	–	0
No. 16 Penn State		–		7	–	3	–	0
Army		–		7	–	3	–	0
Air Force		–		7	–	4	–	0
Boston College		–		6	–	3	–	0
Buffalo		–		5	–	3	–	1
Southern Miss		–		5	–	3	–	1
Villanova		–		5	–	4	–	0
Oregon State		–		5	–	5	–	0
San Jose State		–		5	–	5	–	0
Xavier		–		5	–	4	–	1
West Texas State		–		4	–	4	–	1
Florida State		–		4	–	5	–	1
Colgate		–		3	–	4	–	1
New Mexico State		–		3	–	6	–	1
Colorado State		–		3	–	7	–	0
Miami (FL)		–		3	–	7	–	0
Texas Western		–		3	–	7	–	0
Detroit		–		2	–	6	–	1
Holy Cross		–		2	–	6	–	1
Notre Dame		–		2	–	7	–	0
Pacific (CA)		–		2	–	8	–	0
Houston		–		2	–	8	–	0
Boston University		–		1	–	6	–	1
Dayton		–		1	–	7	–	2
Rankings from Coaches Poll

The 1963 Miami Hurricanes football team represented the University of Miami as an independent during the 1963 NCAA University Division football season. Led by 16th-year head coach Andy Gustafson, the Hurricanes played their home games at the Miami Orange Bowl in Miami, Florida. They finished the season 3–7.

== Schedule ==
Date	Opponent	Site	TV	Result	Attendance	Source
September 19	Florida State	Miami Orange Bowl; Miami, FL (rivalry)		L 0–24	57,500	
September 28	Purdue	Miami Orange Bowl; Miami, FL		W 3–0	46,823	
October 4	at Tulane	Tulane Stadium; New Orleans, LA		W 10–0	18,000	
October 11	LSU	Miami Orange Bowl; Miami, FL		L 0–3	45,986	
October 18	Georgia	Miami Orange Bowl; Miami, FL		L 14–31	44,895–45,895	
November 2	at Kentucky	McLean Stadium; Lexington, KY		W 20–14	27,500	
November 16	at North Carolina	Kenan Memorial Stadium; Chapel Hill, NC		L 16–27	28,000	
November 23	Florida	Miami Orange Bowl; Miami, FL (rivalry)		L 21–27	57,773	
November 30	No. 5 Pittsburgh	Miami Orange Bowl; Miami, FL		L 20–31	33,230	
December 14	No. 9 Alabama	Miami Orange Bowl; Miami, FL	CBS	L 12–17	25,472	
Rankings from AP Poll released prior to the game; Source:

== Roster ==
1963 Miami Hurricanes football team roster
Players
Coaches
Offense

Pos.	#	Name	Class
OT		Dan Conners	Sr
QB	10	George Mira	Sr

Defense

Pos.	#	Name	Class

Special teams

Pos.	#	Name	Class

Head coach

- Andy Gustafson

Coordinators/assistant coaches

- Bill Crutchfield
  (Defensive backs coach)

Legend

- (C) Team captain
- (S) Suspended
- (I) Ineligible
- Injured
- Redshirt
