= 1962 UCLA Bruins football team =

American college football season

1962 UCLA Bruins football
- Conference: Athletic Association of Western Universities
- Record: 4–6 (1–3 AAWU)
- Head coach: Bill Barnes (5th season)
- Home stadium: Los Angeles Memorial Coliseum

1962 Athletic Association of Western Universities football standings
	Conf.					Overall
Team	W		L		T	W		L		T
No. 1 USC $	4	–	0	–	0	11	–	0	–	0
Washington	4	–	1	–	0	7	–	1	–	2
Washington State	1	–	1	–	0	5	–	4	–	1
Stanford	2	–	3	–	0	5	–	5	–	0
UCLA	1	–	3	–	0	4	–	6	–	0
California	0	–	4	–	0	1	–	9	–	0
$ – Conference champion; Rankings from AP Poll

The 1962 UCLA Bruins football team was an American football team that represented the University of California, Los Angeles (UCLA) as a member of the Athletic Association of Western Universities (AAWU) during the 1962 NCAA University Division football season. In their fifth year under head coach Bill Barnes, the Bruins compiled an overall record of 4–6 record with a mark of 1–3 in conference play, placing fifth in AAWU.

UCLA's offensive leaders in 1962 were quarterback Larry Zeno with 458 passing yards, Kermit Alexander with 472 rushing yards, and Mel Profit with 229 receiving yards.

== Schedule ==
Date	Opponent	Site	Result	Attendance	Source
October 6	No. 1 Ohio State*	Los Angeles Memorial Coliseum; Los Angeles, CA	W 9–7	48,513	
October 12	Colorado State*	Los Angeles Memorial Coliseum; Los Angeles, CA	W 35–7	22,846	
October 20	at Pittsburgh*	Pitt Stadium; Pittsburgh, PA	L 6–8	40,419	
October 27	Stanford	Los Angeles Memorial Coliseum; Los Angeles, CA	L 7–17	33,415	
November 3	at California	California Memorial Stadium; Berkeley, CA (rivalry)	W 26–16	43,600	
November 10	Air Force*	Los Angeles Memorial Coliseum; Los Angeles, CA	L 11–17	25,558	
November 17	at Washington	Husky Stadium; Seattle, WA	L 0–30	54,000	
November 24	No. 1 USC	Los Angeles Memorial Coliseum; Los Angeles, CA (Victory Bell)	L 3–14	86,740	
December 1	at Utah*	Ute Stadium; Salt Lake City, UT	W 14–11	11,132	
December 7	Syracuse*	Los Angeles Memorial Coliseum; Los Angeles, CA	L 7–12	14,485	
*Non-conference game; Rankings from AP Poll released prior to the game; Source:
