= 1963 Army Cadets football team =

American college football season

1963 Army Cadets football
- Conference: Independent
- Record: 7–3
- Head coach: Paul Dietzel (2nd season)
- Captain: Dick Nowak
- Home stadium: Michie Stadium

1963 NCAA University Division independents football records
	Conf.			Overall
Team	W	L	T	W		L		T
No. 14 Memphis State		–		9	–	0	–	1
No. 3 Pittsburgh		–		9	–	1	–	0
No. 2 Navy		–		9	–	2	–	0
No. 12 Syracuse		–		8	–	2	–	0
Utah State		–		8	–	2	–	0
Oregon		–		8	–	3	–	0
No. 16 Penn State		–		7	–	3	–	0
Army		–		7	–	3	–	0
Air Force		–		7	–	4	–	0
Boston College		–		6	–	3	–	0
Buffalo		–		5	–	3	–	1
Southern Miss		–		5	–	3	–	1
Villanova		–		5	–	4	–	0
Oregon State		–		5	–	5	–	0
San Jose State		–		5	–	5	–	0
Xavier		–		5	–	4	–	1
West Texas State		–		4	–	4	–	1
Florida State		–		4	–	5	–	1
Colgate		–		3	–	4	–	1
New Mexico State		–		3	–	6	–	1
Colorado State		–		3	–	7	–	0
Miami (FL)		–		3	–	7	–	0
Texas Western		–		3	–	7	–	0
Detroit		–		2	–	6	–	1
Holy Cross		–		2	–	6	–	1
Notre Dame		–		2	–	7	–	0
Pacific (CA)		–		2	–	8	–	0
Houston		–		2	–	8	–	0
Boston University		–		1	–	6	–	1
Dayton		–		1	–	7	–	2
Rankings from Coaches Poll

The 1963 Army Cadets football team represented the United States Military Academy as an independent during the 1963 NCAA University Division football season. In their second year under head coach Paul Dietzel, the Cadets compiled a 7–3 record and outscored all opponents by a combined total of 177 to 97. In the annual Army–Navy Game, the Cadets lost to the Midshipmen by a 21 to 15 score. The Cadets also lost to Minnesota and Pittsburgh.

Army guard Dick Nowak was selected by the UPI and the American Football Coaches Association as a second-team player on the 1963 College Football All-America Team.

== Schedule ==
Date	Opponent	Site	Result	Attendance	Source
September 21	Boston University	Michie Stadium; West Point, NY	W 30–0	18,150	
September 28	Cincinnati	Michie Stadium; West Point, NY	W 22–0	17,700	
October 5	at Minnesota	Memorial Stadium; Minneapolis, MN	L 8–24	60,264	
October 12	at Penn State	Beaver Stadium; University Park, PA	W 10–7	48,850	
October 19	Wake Forest	Michie Stadium; West Point, NY	W 47–0	30,200	
October 26	Washington State	Michie Stadium; West Point, NY	W 23–0	31,200	
November 2	vs. Air Force	Soldier Field; Chicago, IL (rivalry)	W 14–10	76,660	
November 9	Utah	Michie Stadium; West Point, NY	W 8–7	22,400	
November 16	at Pittsburgh	Pitt Stadium; Pittsburgh, PA	L 0–28	47,947	
December 7	vs. Navy	Philadelphia Municipal Stadium; Philadelphia, PA (Army–Navy Game)	L 15–21	100,000	

== Roster ==
- Rollie Stichweh
