= 1963 Florida State Seminoles football team =

American college football season

1963 Florida State Seminoles football
- Conference: Independent
- Record: 4–5–1
- Head coach: Bill Peterson (4th season)
- Offensive scheme: Pro set
- Defensive coordinator: Don James (2nd season)
- Base defense: 4–3
- Captains: Charlie Calhoun; Chuck Robinson
- Home stadium: Doak Campbell Stadium

1963 NCAA University Division independents football records
| | Conf. | | | Overall |
| Team | W | L | T | W | | L | | T |
|---|---|---|---|---|---|---|---|---|
| No. 14 Memphis State | | – | | 9 | – | 0 | – | 1 |
| No. 3 Pittsburgh | | – | | 9 | – | 1 | – | 0 |
| No. 2 Navy | | – | | 9 | – | 2 | – | 0 |
| No. 12 Syracuse | | – | | 8 | – | 2 | – | 0 |
| Utah State | | – | | 8 | – | 2 | – | 0 |
| Oregon | | – | | 8 | – | 3 | – | 0 |
| No. 16 Penn State | | – | | 7 | – | 3 | – | 0 |
| Army | | – | | 7 | – | 3 | – | 0 |
| Air Force | | – | | 7 | – | 4 | – | 0 |
| Boston College | | – | | 6 | – | 3 | – | 0 |
| Buffalo | | – | | 5 | – | 3 | – | 1 |
| Southern Miss | | – | | 5 | – | 3 | – | 1 |
| Villanova | | – | | 5 | – | 4 | – | 0 |
| Oregon State | | – | | 5 | – | 5 | – | 0 |
| San Jose State | | – | | 5 | – | 5 | – | 0 |
| Xavier | | – | | 5 | – | 4 | – | 1 |
| West Texas State | | – | | 4 | – | 4 | – | 1 |
| Florida State | | – | | 4 | – | 5 | – | 1 |
| Colgate | | – | | 3 | – | 4 | – | 1 |
| New Mexico State | | – | | 3 | – | 6 | – | 1 |
| Colorado State | | – | | 3 | – | 7 | – | 0 |
| Miami (FL) | | – | | 3 | – | 7 | – | 0 |
| Texas Western | | – | | 3 | – | 7 | – | 0 |
| Detroit | | – | | 2 | – | 6 | – | 1 |
| Holy Cross | | – | | 2 | – | 6 | – | 1 |
| Notre Dame | | – | | 2 | – | 7 | – | 0 |
| Pacific (CA) | | – | | 2 | – | 8 | – | 0 |
| Houston | | – | | 2 | – | 8 | – | 0 |
| Boston University | | – | | 1 | – | 6 | – | 1 |
| Dayton | | – | | 1 | – | 7 | – | 2 |
Rankings from Coaches Poll

The 1963 Florida State Seminoles football team represented Florida State University as an independent during the 1963 NCAA University Division football season. This was Bill Peterson's fourth year as head coach, and he led the team to a 4–5–1 record.

While an FSU student and before he became famous as lead vocalist for The Doors, Jim Morrison was arrested for public drunkenness, resisting arrest, and disturbing the peace at the September 28 game against TCU.

The game against Auburn was one of only 6 games across the country not to be canceled due to the assassination of President John F. Kennedy the day before.

== Schedule ==
| Date | Opponent | Site | Result | Attendance | Source |
|---|---|---|---|---|---|
| September 20 | at Miami (FL) | Orange Bowl; Miami, FL (rivalry) | W 24–0 | 57,500 | |
| September 28 | TCU | Doak Campbell Stadium; Tallahassee, FL | L 0–13 | 16,000 | |
| October 12 | Wake Forest | Doak Campbell Stadium; Tallahassee, FL | W 35–0 | 15,000 | |
| October 19 | at Southern Miss | Ladd Stadium; Mobile, AL | T 0–0 | 11,353 | |
| October 26 | Virginia Tech | Doak Campbell Stadium; Tallahassee, FL | L 23–31 | 16,500 | |
| November 2 | Furman | Doak Campbell Stadium; Tallahassee, FL | W 49–6 | 12,000 | |
| November 9 | at Georgia Tech | Grant Field; Atlanta, GA | L 7–15 | 49,804 | |
| November 16 | NC State | Doak Campbell Stadium; Tallahassee, FL | W 14–0 | 23,851 | |
| November 23 | at No. 9 Auburn | Cliff Hare Stadium; Auburn, AL | L 15–21 | 28,000 | |
| November 30 | at Florida | Florida Field; Gainesville, FL (rivalry) | L 0–7 | 45,000 | |
Rankings from AP Poll released prior to the game

== Roster ==
- WR Fred Biletnikoff, Jr.
