= 1963 Oregon Ducks football team =

American college football season

1963 Oregon Ducks football

Sun Bowl champion

Sun Bowl, W 21–14 vs. SMU
- Conference: Independent
- Record: 8–3
- Head coach: Len Casanova (13th season)
- MVP: Mel Renfro
- Captains: Mel Renfro; Larry Hill; Dick Imwalle
- Home stadium: Hayward Field; Multnomah Stadium

1963 NCAA University Division independents football records
| | Conf. | | | Overall |
| Team | W | L | T | W | | L | | T |
|---|---|---|---|---|---|---|---|---|
| No. 14 Memphis State | | – | | 9 | – | 0 | – | 1 |
| No. 3 Pittsburgh | | – | | 9 | – | 1 | – | 0 |
| No. 2 Navy | | – | | 9 | – | 2 | – | 0 |
| No. 12 Syracuse | | – | | 8 | – | 2 | – | 0 |
| Utah State | | – | | 8 | – | 2 | – | 0 |
| Oregon | | – | | 8 | – | 3 | – | 0 |
| No. 16 Penn State | | – | | 7 | – | 3 | – | 0 |
| Army | | – | | 7 | – | 3 | – | 0 |
| Air Force | | – | | 7 | – | 4 | – | 0 |
| Boston College | | – | | 6 | – | 3 | – | 0 |
| Buffalo | | – | | 5 | – | 3 | – | 1 |
| Southern Miss | | – | | 5 | – | 3 | – | 1 |
| Villanova | | – | | 5 | – | 4 | – | 0 |
| Oregon State | | – | | 5 | – | 5 | – | 0 |
| San Jose State | | – | | 5 | – | 5 | – | 0 |
| Xavier | | – | | 5 | – | 4 | – | 1 |
| West Texas State | | – | | 4 | – | 4 | – | 1 |
| Florida State | | – | | 4 | – | 5 | – | 1 |
| Colgate | | – | | 3 | – | 4 | – | 1 |
| New Mexico State | | – | | 3 | – | 6 | – | 1 |
| Colorado State | | – | | 3 | – | 7 | – | 0 |
| Miami (FL) | | – | | 3 | – | 7 | – | 0 |
| Texas Western | | – | | 3 | – | 7 | – | 0 |
| Detroit | | – | | 2 | – | 6 | – | 1 |
| Holy Cross | | – | | 2 | – | 6 | – | 1 |
| Notre Dame | | – | | 2 | – | 7 | – | 0 |
| Pacific (CA) | | – | | 2 | – | 8 | – | 0 |
| Houston | | – | | 2 | – | 8 | – | 0 |
| Boston University | | – | | 1 | – | 6 | – | 1 |
| Dayton | | – | | 1 | – | 7 | – | 2 |
Rankings from Coaches Poll

The 1963 Oregon Ducks represented the University of Oregon as an independent during the 1963 NCAA University Division football season. The Ducks outscored their opponents 274 to 153. Led by 12th-year head coach Len Casanova, the Ducks were 7–3 in the regular season and won the Sun Bowl over SMU on New Year's Eve. Three home games were played on campus at Hayward Field in Eugene and three at Multnomah Stadium in Portland.

Notable players included Mel Renfro, Dave Wilcox, H.D. Murphy, and Bob Berry, all selected in the 1964 NFL Draft. Berry was a redshirt junior and played another season for Oregon in 1964. Renfro and Wilcox are members of the Pro Football Hall of Fame. Murphy was selected late and never played in the NFL; he played in the emerging Continental Football League.

Following the disbandment of the Pacific Coast Conference, both Oregon and Oregon State were independent in football for five seasons, from 1959 through 1963. Both joined the AAWU (Pac-8) for the 1964 season. The Pac-8 had bowl restrictions (Rose Bowl only) until 1975; the Ducks' next postseason appearance was at the 1989 Independence Bowl.

== Schedule ==
| Date | Time | Opponent | Site | Result | Attendance | Source |
|---|---|---|---|---|---|---|
| September 21 | 8:00 pm | Penn State | Multnomah Stadium; Portland, OR | L 7–17 | 30,355 | |
| September 28 | 1:30 pm | at Stanford | Stanford Stadium; Stanford, CA | W 36–7 | 31,000 | |
| October 5 | 11:30 am | at West Virginia | Mountaineer Field; Morgantown, WV | W 35–0 | 24,000 | |
| October 12 | 1:30 pm | Idaho | Hayward Field; Eugene, OR | W 41–21 | 19,200 | |
| October 19 | 1:30 pm | at Arizona | Arizona Stadium; Tucson, AZ | W 28–12 | 16,000 | |
| October 26 | 2:00 pm | Washington | Multnomah Stadium; Portland, OR (rivalry) | L 19–26 | 35,690 | |
| November 2 | 1:30 pm | San Jose State | Hayward Field; Eugene OR | L 7–13 | 14,000 | |
| November 9 | 1:30 pm | at Washington State | Rogers Field; Pullman, WA | W 21–7 | 13,000 | |
| November 16 | 1:30 pm | Indiana | Multnomah Stadium; Portland, OR | W 28–22 | 19,051 | |
| November 30 | 1:30 pm | Oregon State | Hayward Field; Eugene, OR (Civil War) | W 31–14 | 20,700 | |
| December 31 | 1:00 pm | vs. SMU | Sun Bowl; El Paso, TX (Sun Bowl) | W 21–14 | 26,500 | |
All times are in Pacific time; Source:

- The Civil War game was delayed a week following the assassination of President Kennedy.

== Game summaries ==
=== Indiana ===
Indiana at Oregon

| Team | 1 | 2 | 3 | 4 | Total |
|---|---|---|---|---|---|
| Indiana | 6 | 7 | 0 | 9 | 22 |
| • Oregon | 0 | 6 | 8 | 14 | 28 |

- Date: Saturday, November 16
- Location: Multnomah Stadium, Portland, Oregon
- Game attendance: 19,051
- Source: Eugene Register-Guard

Scoring summary
| 1 | | IND | Nowatzke 52-yard interception return (kick failed) | IND 6-0 |
| 2 | | IND | Badar 10-yard run (Westfall kick) | IND 13-0 |
| 2 | | ORE | Imwalle 21-yard pass from Berry (kick failed) | IND 13-6 |
| 3 | | ORE | Renfro 4-yard run (Renfro run) | ORE 14-13 |
| 4 | | IND | Badar 1-yard run (run failed) | IND 19-14 |
| 4 | | ORE | Hill 37-yard pass from Berry (Corey kick) | ORE 21-19 |
| 4 | | IND | Nowatzke 26-yard field goal | IND 22-21 |
| 4 | 0:11 | ORE | Murphy 29-yard pass from Berry (Corey kick) | ORE 28-22 |

== Personnel ==
=== Coaching staff ===
- Max Coley, backs
- Jerry Frei, line
- Ed Johns, freshmen
- Phil McHugh
- John Robinson
- Jack Roche

=== Roster ===
- QB Bob Berry, Jr.
- FB Lu Bain, Sr.
- HB Larry Hill, Sr.
- E Dick Imwalle, Sr.
- HB Dennis Keller, So.
- HB H.D. Murphy, Sr.
- HB Mel Renfro, Sr.
- E Rich Schwab, Sr.
- QB Jack Sovereign, So.
- G Dave Wilcox, Sr.

== NFL draft ==
Four Oregon players were selected in the 1964 NFL draft, which went 20 rounds (280 selections).

| Player | Position | Round | Pick | NFL club |
| Mel Renfro | Defensive back | 2 | 17 | Dallas Cowboys |
| Dave Wilcox | Linebacker | 3 | 29 | San Francisco 49ers |
| Bob Berry | Quarterback | 11 | 142 | Philadelphia Eagles |
| H. D. Murphy | Halfback | 19 | 256 | Dallas Cowboys |
