= 1963 Air Force Falcons football team =

American college football season

1963 Air Force Falcons football
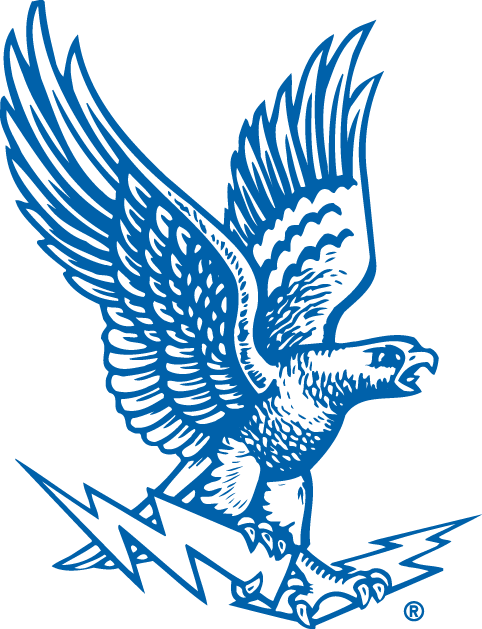

Gator Bowl, L 0–35 vs. North Carolina
- Conference: Independent
- Record: 7–4
- Head coach: Ben Martin (6th season)
- Captains: Terry Isaacson; Todd Jagerson
- Home stadium: Falcon Stadium

1963 NCAA University Division independents football records
	Conf.			Overall
Team	W	L	T	W		L		T
No. 14 Memphis State		–		9	–	0	–	1
No. 3 Pittsburgh		–		9	–	1	–	0
No. 2 Navy		–		9	–	2	–	0
No. 12 Syracuse		–		8	–	2	–	0
Utah State		–		8	–	2	–	0
Oregon		–		8	–	3	–	0
No. 16 Penn State		–		7	–	3	–	0
Army		–		7	–	3	–	0
Air Force		–		7	–	4	–	0
Boston College		–		6	–	3	–	0
Buffalo		–		5	–	3	–	1
Southern Miss		–		5	–	3	–	1
Villanova		–		5	–	4	–	0
Oregon State		–		5	–	5	–	0
San Jose State		–		5	–	5	–	0
Xavier		–		5	–	4	–	1
West Texas State		–		4	–	4	–	1
Florida State		–		4	–	5	–	1
Colgate		–		3	–	4	–	1
New Mexico State		–		3	–	6	–	1
Colorado State		–		3	–	7	–	0
Miami (FL)		–		3	–	7	–	0
Texas Western		–		3	–	7	–	0
Detroit		–		2	–	6	–	1
Holy Cross		–		2	–	6	–	1
Notre Dame		–		2	–	7	–	0
Pacific (CA)		–		2	–	8	–	0
Houston		–		2	–	8	–	0
Boston University		–		1	–	6	–	1
Dayton		–		1	–	7	–	2
Rankings from Coaches Poll

The 1963 Air Force Falcons football team represented the United States Air Force Academy as an independent during the 1963 NCAA University Division football season. Led by sixth-year head coach Ben Martin, the Falcons compiled a record of 7–4. Air Force played in its second bowl game, the Gator Bowl, where they were shut out, 35–0, by North Carolina. The Falcons played their home games at Falcon Stadium in Colorado Springs, Colorado.

== Schedule ==
Date	Opponent	Site	Result	Attendance	Source
September 21	No. 10 Washington	Falcon Stadium; Colorado Springs, CO	W 10–7	23,542	
September 28	Colorado State	Falcon Stadium; Colorado Springs, CO (rivalry)	W 69–0	27,283	
October 5	at SMU	Cotton Bowl; Dallas, TX	L 0–10	30,000	
October 12	at Nebraska	Memorial Stadium; Lincoln, NE	W 17–13	38,000	
October 19	at Maryland	Byrd Stadium; College Park, MD	L 14–21	31,000	
October 26	Boston College	Falcon Stadium; Colorado Springs, CO	W 34–7	30,144	
November 2	vs. Army	Soldier Field; Chicago, IL (rivalry)	L 10–14	76,660	
November 9	UCLA	Falcon Stadium; Colorado Springs, CO	W 48–21	31,937	
November 16	at New Mexico	University Stadium; Albuquerque, NM	W 30–8	29,004	
December 7	Colorado	Falcon Stadium; Colorado Springs, CO	W 17–14	26,016	
December 28	vs. North Carolina	Gator Bowl; Jacksonville, FL (Gator Bowl)	L 0–35	50,018	
Rankings from AP Poll released prior to the game; Source:

== Roster ==
1963 Air Force Falcons football team roster
Players
Coaches
Offense

Pos.	#	Name	Class
HB	27	Dick Czarnota
E		Fritz Greenlee	So
QB	17	Terry Isaacson	Sr
C		Joe Rodwell	Sr
		Paul Wargo

Defense

Pos.	#	Name	Class

Special teams

Pos.	#	Name	Class
PK		Bart Holiday

Head coach

- Ben Martin (6th year)

Coordinators/assistant coaches

Legend

- (C) Team captain
- (S) Suspended
- (I) Ineligible
- Injured
- Redshirt

== Awards and honors ==
Joe Rodwell

- All-American (Helms)
