= John Rohde =

American football player and coach (1927–2001)

Biographical details
- Born: February 10, 1927; San Jose, California, U.S.
- Died: July 12, 2001 (aged 74); Sacramento, California, U.S.

Playing career
- 1946–1949: Pacific (CA)
- Position: End

Coaching career (HC unless noted)
- 1950: Pacific (CA) (GA)
- 1953–1960: Pacific (CA) (assistant)
- 1961–1963: Pacific (CA)

Head coaching record
- Overall: 12–7

Accomplishments and honors

Awards
- Second-team All-PCC (1949)

John Henry Rohde (February 10, 1927 – July 12, 2001) was an American football player and coach. He served as the head football coach at the University of the Pacific in Stockton, California from 1961 to 1963, compiling a record of 12–7. Rohde attended Abraham Lincoln High School in San Jose, California and played college football as an end at Pacific from 1946 to 1949. He was selected to play in the East–West Shrine Game in 1949. Rohde was selected by the Washington Redskins of the National Football League (NFL) in the eighth round of the 1950 NFL draft. Following a brief stint with the Redskins, Rohde worked as graduate assistant as his alma mater. He was engaged in business in Arizona in 1951 and 1952 before returning to Pacific again in 1953 as an assistant coach. He was appointed as assistant athletic director at Pacific in 1957. Rohde died of a heart attack at the age of 74, on July 12, 2001, in Sacramento, California.

== Head coaching record ==
=== College ===
Year	Team	Overall	Conference	Standing	Bowl/playoffs
Pacific Tigers (Independent) (1961–1963)
1961	Pacific	5–4			
Pacific Tigers (NCAA University Division independent) (1962–1963)
1962	Pacific	5–5			
1963	Pacific	2–8			
Pacific:		12–7			
Total:		12–7			
