= 1963 New Mexico State Aggies football team =

American college football season

1963 New Mexico State Aggies football
- Conference: Independent
- Record: 3–6–1
- Head coach: Warren B. Woodson (6th season)
- Home stadium: Memorial Stadium

1963 NCAA University Division independents football records
| | Conf. | | | Overall |
| Team | W | L | T | W | | L | | T |
|---|---|---|---|---|---|---|---|---|
| No. 14 Memphis State | | – | | 9 | – | 0 | – | 1 |
| No. 3 Pittsburgh | | – | | 9 | – | 1 | – | 0 |
| No. 2 Navy | | – | | 9 | – | 2 | – | 0 |
| No. 12 Syracuse | | – | | 8 | – | 2 | – | 0 |
| Utah State | | – | | 8 | – | 2 | – | 0 |
| Oregon | | – | | 8 | – | 3 | – | 0 |
| No. 16 Penn State | | – | | 7 | – | 3 | – | 0 |
| Army | | – | | 7 | – | 3 | – | 0 |
| Air Force | | – | | 7 | – | 4 | – | 0 |
| Boston College | | – | | 6 | – | 3 | – | 0 |
| Buffalo | | – | | 5 | – | 3 | – | 1 |
| Southern Miss | | – | | 5 | – | 3 | – | 1 |
| Villanova | | – | | 5 | – | 4 | – | 0 |
| Oregon State | | – | | 5 | – | 5 | – | 0 |
| San Jose State | | – | | 5 | – | 5 | – | 0 |
| Xavier | | – | | 5 | – | 4 | – | 1 |
| West Texas State | | – | | 4 | – | 4 | – | 1 |
| Florida State | | – | | 4 | – | 5 | – | 1 |
| Colgate | | – | | 3 | – | 4 | – | 1 |
| New Mexico State | | – | | 3 | – | 6 | – | 1 |
| Colorado State | | – | | 3 | – | 7 | – | 0 |
| Miami (FL) | | – | | 3 | – | 7 | – | 0 |
| Texas Western | | – | | 3 | – | 7 | – | 0 |
| Detroit | | – | | 2 | – | 6 | – | 1 |
| Holy Cross | | – | | 2 | – | 6 | – | 1 |
| Notre Dame | | – | | 2 | – | 7 | – | 0 |
| Pacific (CA) | | – | | 2 | – | 8 | – | 0 |
| Houston | | – | | 2 | – | 8 | – | 0 |
| Boston University | | – | | 1 | – | 6 | – | 1 |
| Dayton | | – | | 1 | – | 7 | – | 2 |
Rankings from Coaches Poll

The 1963 New Mexico State Aggies football team was an American football team that represented New Mexico State University as an independent during the 1963 NCAA University Division football season. In its sixth year under head coach Warren B. Woodson, the team compiled a 3–6–1 record and was outscored by a total of 209 to 158.

Woodson was later inducted into the College Football Hall of Fame.

== Schedule ==
| Date | Opponent | Site | Result | Attendance | Source |
|---|---|---|---|---|---|
| September 14 | Eastern New Mexico | Memorial Stadium; Las Cruces, NM | W 21–0 | 7,400 | |
| September 28 | at Arizona State | Sun Devil Stadium; Tempe, AZ | L 13–14 | 26,882 | |
| October 5 | at Texas Western | Sun Bowl; El Paso, TX (rivalry) | L 13–14 | 22,000 | |
| October 12 | at Trinity (TX) | Alamo Stadium; San Antonio, TX | W 40–8 | 4,655 | |
| October 19 | New Mexico | Memorial Stadium; Las Cruces, NM (rivalry) | W 13–12 | 12,491 | |
| October 26 | Hardin–Simmons | Memorial Stadium; Las Cruces, NM | L 6–41 | 8,000 | |
| November 2 | Wichita^{†} | Memorial Stadium; Las Cruces, NM | L 7–47 | 9,000 | |
| November 9 | at West Texas State | Buffalo Bowl; Canyon, TX | T 24–24 | 11,364 | |
| November 16 | Utah State | Memorial Stadium; Las Cruces, NM | L 6–7 | 8,400 | |
| November 28 | Sul Ross | Memorial Stadium; Las Cruces, NM | L 15–42 | | |
^{†}Homecoming
