= 1962 Washington Huskies football team =

American college football season

1962 Washington Huskies football
- Conference: Athletic Association of Western Universities

Ranking
- Coaches: No. 14
- Record: 7–1–2 (4–1 AAWU)
- Head coach: Jim Owens (6th season)
- Captains: Bob Monroe; Rod Scheyer
- Home stadium: University of Washington Stadium

1962 Athletic Association of Western Universities football standings
	Conf.					Overall
Team	W		L		T	W		L		T
No. 1 USC $	4	–	0	–	0	11	–	0	–	0
Washington	4	–	1	–	0	7	–	1	–	2
Washington State	1	–	1	–	0	5	–	4	–	1
Stanford	2	–	3	–	0	5	–	5	–	0
UCLA	1	–	3	–	0	4	–	6	–	0
California	0	–	4	–	0	1	–	9	–	0
$ – Conference champion; Rankings from AP Poll

The 1962 Washington Huskies football team was an American football team that represented the University of Washington during the 1962 NCAA University Division football season. In its sixth season under head coach Jim Owens, the team compiled a 7–1–2 record, finished second in the Athletic Association of Western Universities, and outscored its opponents 208 to 82.

Bob Monroe and Rod Scheyer were the team captains.

== Schedule ==
Date	Opponent	Rank	Site	Result	Attendance	Source
September 22	No. 7 Purdue*	No. 10	University of Washington Stadium; Seattle, WA	T 7–7	55,800	
September 29	Illinois*		University of Washington Stadium; Seattle, WA	W 28–7	54,000	
October 6	Kansas State*	No. 8	University of Washington Stadium; Seattle, WA	W 41–0	51,000	
October 13	Oregon State*	No. 7	University of Washington Stadium; Seattle, WA	W 14–13	30,030	
October 20	at Stanford	No. 9	Stanford Stadium; Stanford, CA	W 14–0	24,000	
October 27	Oregon*	No. 8	Multnomah Stadium; Portland, OR (rivalry)	T 21–21	56,823	
November 3	at No. 3 USC	No. 9	Los Angeles Memorial Coliseum; Los Angeles, CA	L 0–14	46,456	
November 10	California		University of Washington Stadium; Seattle, WA	W 27–0	54,800	
November 17	UCLA		University of Washington Stadium; Seattle, WA	W 30–0	54,000	
November 24	at Washington State		Joe Albi Stadium; Spokane, WA (rivalry)	W 26–21	35,700	
*Non-conference game; Rankings from AP Poll released prior to the game; Source:

== Coaching staff ==
- Bert Clark
- Dick Heatly
- Thurmon Jones
- Ed Peasley
- Tom Tipps
- Chesty Walker
- Don White

== Professional football draft selections ==
Four University of Washington Huskies were selected in the 1963 NFL draft, which lasted 20 rounds with 280 selections. Two of those Huskies were also selected in the 1963 AFL draft, which lasted 29 rounds with 232 selections.

= Husky Hall of Fame

League	Player	Position	Round	Pick	Franchise
NFL	Ray Mansfield	Center	2nd	18	Philadelphia Eagles
NFL	Charley Mitchell	Halfback	4th	52	Chicago Bears
NFL	Rod Scheyer	Tackle	10th	132	Dallas Cowboys
NFL	Jim Stiger	Back	19th	258	Dallas Cowboys
AFL	Ray Mansfield	Center	5th	37	Denver Broncos
AFL	Charley Mitchell	Halfback	18th	141	Denver Broncos
