= 1963 Colorado State Rams football team =

American college football season

1963 Colorado State Rams football
- Conference: Independent
- Record: 3–7
- Head coach: Mike Lude (2nd season)
- Home stadium: Colorado Field

1963 NCAA University Division independents football records
	Conf.			Overall
Team	W	L	T	W		L		T
No. 14 Memphis State		–		9	–	0	–	1
No. 3 Pittsburgh		–		9	–	1	–	0
No. 2 Navy		–		9	–	2	–	0
No. 12 Syracuse		–		8	–	2	–	0
Utah State		–		8	–	2	–	0
Oregon		–		8	–	3	–	0
No. 16 Penn State		–		7	–	3	–	0
Army		–		7	–	3	–	0
Air Force		–		7	–	4	–	0
Boston College		–		6	–	3	–	0
Buffalo		–		5	–	3	–	1
Southern Miss		–		5	–	3	–	1
Villanova		–		5	–	4	–	0
Oregon State		–		5	–	5	–	0
San Jose State		–		5	–	5	–	0
Xavier		–		5	–	4	–	1
West Texas State		–		4	–	4	–	1
Florida State		–		4	–	5	–	1
Colgate		–		3	–	4	–	1
New Mexico State		–		3	–	6	–	1
Colorado State		–		3	–	7	–	0
Miami (FL)		–		3	–	7	–	0
Texas Western		–		3	–	7	–	0
Detroit		–		2	–	6	–	1
Holy Cross		–		2	–	6	–	1
Notre Dame		–		2	–	7	–	0
Pacific (CA)		–		2	–	8	–	0
Houston		–		2	–	8	–	0
Boston University		–		1	–	6	–	1
Dayton		–		1	–	7	–	2
Rankings from Coaches Poll

The 1963 Colorado State Rams football team represented Colorado State University as an independent during the 1963 NCAA University Division football season. In their second season under head coach Mike Lude, the Rams compiled a 3–7 record.

== Schedule ==
Date	Opponent	Site	Result	Attendance	Source
September 21	at Pacific (CA)	Pacific Memorial Stadium; Stockton, CA	W 20–0	10,000	
September 28	at Air Force	Falcon Stadium; Colorado Springs, CO (rivalry)	L 0–69	27,283	
October 5	Arizona State	Colorado Field; Fort Collins, CO	L 7–50	12,000	
October 12	at Wyoming	War Memorial Stadium; Laramie, WY (rivalry)	L 3–21	12,442	
October 19	at Utah	Ute Stadium; Salt Lake City, UT	L 14–48	9,812	
October 26	Texas Western^{†}	Colorado Field; Fort Collins, CO	W 21–14	10,500	
November 2	New Mexico	Colorado Field; Fort Collins, CO	L 0–25	7,500	
November 9	Utah State	Colorado Field; Fort Collins, CO	L 13–36	6,500	
November 16	at Montana	Dornblaser Field; Missoula, MT	W 20–12	3,000	
November 23	at BYU	Cougar Stadium; Provo, UT	L 20–24	4,000	
^{†}Homecoming
