= 1963 Colgate Red Raiders football team =

American college football season

1963 Colgate Red Raiders football
- Conference: Independent
- Record: 3–4–1
- Head coach: Hal Lahar (7th season)
- Captain: Eric Orke
- Home stadium: Colgate Athletic Field

1963 NCAA University Division independents football records
	Conf.			Overall
Team	W	L	T	W		L		T
No. 14 Memphis State		–		9	–	0	–	1
No. 3 Pittsburgh		–		9	–	1	–	0
No. 2 Navy		–		9	–	2	–	0
No. 12 Syracuse		–		8	–	2	–	0
Utah State		–		8	–	2	–	0
Oregon		–		8	–	3	–	0
No. 16 Penn State		–		7	–	3	–	0
Army		–		7	–	3	–	0
Air Force		–		7	–	4	–	0
Boston College		–		6	–	3	–	0
Buffalo		–		5	–	3	–	1
Southern Miss		–		5	–	3	–	1
Villanova		–		5	–	4	–	0
Oregon State		–		5	–	5	–	0
San Jose State		–		5	–	5	–	0
Xavier		–		5	–	4	–	1
West Texas State		–		4	–	4	–	1
Florida State		–		4	–	5	–	1
Colgate		–		3	–	4	–	1
New Mexico State		–		3	–	6	–	1
Colorado State		–		3	–	7	–	0
Miami (FL)		–		3	–	7	–	0
Texas Western		–		3	–	7	–	0
Detroit		–		2	–	6	–	1
Holy Cross		–		2	–	6	–	1
Notre Dame		–		2	–	7	–	0
Pacific (CA)		–		2	–	8	–	0
Houston		–		2	–	8	–	0
Boston University		–		1	–	6	–	1
Dayton		–		1	–	7	–	2
Rankings from Coaches Poll

The 1963 Colgate Red Raiders football team was an American football team that represented Colgate University as an independent during the 1963 NCAA University Division football season. In its second consecutive season under head coach Hal Lahar (his seventh overall), the team compiled a 3–4–1 record. James Yurak was the team captain.

Only eight games were played, rather than the usual nine, because the Red Raiders' traditional season-ending matchup with Brown University, slated for Nov. 23, 1963, was canceled following the previous day's assassination of John F. Kennedy.

The team played its home games at Colgate Athletic Field in Hamilton, New York.

== Schedule ==
Date	Opponent	Site	Result	Attendance	Source
September 28	at Cornell	Schoellkopf Field; Ithaca, NY (rivalry)	W 21–17	21,000	
October 5	at Boston University	Nickerson Field; Boston, MA	T 6–6	7,000	
October 12	Rutgers	Colgate Athletic Field; Hamilton, NY	W 28–8	9,000	
October 19	at Princeton	Palmer Stadium; Princeton, NJ	L 0–42	22,500	
October 26	at Yale	Yale Bowl; New Haven, CT	W 26–14	29,827	
November 2	at Lehigh	Taylor Stadium; Bethlehem, PA	W 20–6	7,000	
November 9	Bucknell	Colgate Athletic Field; Hamilton, NY	L 0–14	3,500	
November 16	at Buffalo	Rotary Field; Buffalo, NY	L 0–23	10,943	
November 23	at Brown	Brown Stadium; Providence, RI	Canceled		

== Leading players ==
Statistical leaders for the 1963 Red Raiders included:

- Rushing: Donald Court, 258 yards and 3 touchdowns on 48 attempts
- Passing: Gerald Barudin, 580 yards, 58 completions and 2 touchdowns on 131 attempts
- Receiving: Lee Woltman, 103 yards on 14 receptions
- Total offense: Gerald Barudin, 751 yards (580 passing, 171 rushing)
- Scoring: Thomas Carpenter, 24 points from 4 touchdowns
- All-purpose yards: Lee Woltman, 477 yards (203 kickoff returning, 149 rushing, 103 receiving, 22 punt returning)
