= 1963 Utah State Aggies football team =

American college football season

1963 Utah State Aggies football
- Conference: Independent
- Record: 8–2
- Head coach: Tony Knap (1st season)
- Home stadium: Romney Stadium

1963 NCAA University Division independents football records
| | Conf. | | | Overall |
| Team | W | L | T | W | | L | | T |
|---|---|---|---|---|---|---|---|---|
| No. 14 Memphis State | | – | | 9 | – | 0 | – | 1 |
| No. 3 Pittsburgh | | – | | 9 | – | 1 | – | 0 |
| No. 2 Navy | | – | | 9 | – | 2 | – | 0 |
| No. 12 Syracuse | | – | | 8 | – | 2 | – | 0 |
| Utah State | | – | | 8 | – | 2 | – | 0 |
| Oregon | | – | | 8 | – | 3 | – | 0 |
| No. 16 Penn State | | – | | 7 | – | 3 | – | 0 |
| Army | | – | | 7 | – | 3 | – | 0 |
| Air Force | | – | | 7 | – | 4 | – | 0 |
| Boston College | | – | | 6 | – | 3 | – | 0 |
| Buffalo | | – | | 5 | – | 3 | – | 1 |
| Southern Miss | | – | | 5 | – | 3 | – | 1 |
| Villanova | | – | | 5 | – | 4 | – | 0 |
| Oregon State | | – | | 5 | – | 5 | – | 0 |
| San Jose State | | – | | 5 | – | 5 | – | 0 |
| Xavier | | – | | 5 | – | 4 | – | 1 |
| West Texas State | | – | | 4 | – | 4 | – | 1 |
| Florida State | | – | | 4 | – | 5 | – | 1 |
| Colgate | | – | | 3 | – | 4 | – | 1 |
| New Mexico State | | – | | 3 | – | 6 | – | 1 |
| Colorado State | | – | | 3 | – | 7 | – | 0 |
| Miami (FL) | | – | | 3 | – | 7 | – | 0 |
| Texas Western | | – | | 3 | – | 7 | – | 0 |
| Detroit | | – | | 2 | – | 6 | – | 1 |
| Holy Cross | | – | | 2 | – | 6 | – | 1 |
| Notre Dame | | – | | 2 | – | 7 | – | 0 |
| Pacific (CA) | | – | | 2 | – | 8 | – | 0 |
| Houston | | – | | 2 | – | 8 | – | 0 |
| Boston University | | – | | 1 | – | 6 | – | 1 |
| Dayton | | – | | 1 | – | 7 | – | 2 |
Rankings from Coaches Poll

The 1963 Utah State Aggies football team was an American football team that represented Utah State University as an independent during the 1963 NCAA University Division football season. In their first season under head coach Tony Knap, the Aggies compiled an 8–2 record and outscored all opponents by a total of 318 to 99.

The team's statistical leaders included Bill Munson with 1,699 passing yards, Larry Campbell with 585 rushing yards, Roger Foulk with 229 receiving yards, and Darrell Steele with 52 points scored.

== Schedule ==
| Date | Opponent | Site | Result | Attendance | Source |
|---|---|---|---|---|---|
| September 21 | at Arizona | Arizona Stadium; Tucson, AZ | W 42–0 | 25,000 | |
| September 28 | at Wyoming | War Memorial Stadium; Laramie, WY (rivalry) | L 14–21 | 18,221 | |
| October 5 | San Jose State | Romney Stadium; Logan, UT | W 20–0 | 9,005 | |
| October 12 | New Mexico | Romney Stadium; Logan, UT | W 47–14 | 9,021–9,377 | |
| October 19 | at Montana | Dornblaser Field; Missoula, MT | W 62–6 | 3,500 | |
| October 26 | Pacific (CA) | Romney Stadium; Logan, UT | W 40–14 | 11,453 | |
| November 2 | at BYU | Cougar Stadium; Provo, UT (rivalry) | W 26–0 | 13,343 | |
| November 9 | at Colorado State | Colorado Field; Fort Collins, CO | W 36–13 | 6,500 | |
| November 16 | at New Mexico State | Memorial Stadium; Las Cruces, NM | W 7–6 | 8,400 | |
| November 23 | Utah | Romney Stadium; Logan, UT (rivalry) | L 23–25 | 15,520 | |
