= 1963 San Jose State Spartans football team =

American college football season

1963 San Jose State Spartans football
- Conference: Independent
- Record: 5–5
- Head coach: Bob Titchenal (7th season)
- Home stadium: Spartan Stadium

1963 NCAA University Division independents football records
	Conf.			Overall
Team	W	L	T	W		L		T
No. 14 Memphis State		–		9	–	0	–	1
No. 3 Pittsburgh		–		9	–	1	–	0
No. 2 Navy		–		9	–	2	–	0
No. 12 Syracuse		–		8	–	2	–	0
Utah State		–		8	–	2	–	0
Oregon		–		8	–	3	–	0
No. 16 Penn State		–		7	–	3	–	0
Army		–		7	–	3	–	0
Air Force		–		7	–	4	–	0
Boston College		–		6	–	3	–	0
Buffalo		–		5	–	3	–	1
Southern Miss		–		5	–	3	–	1
Villanova		–		5	–	4	–	0
Oregon State		–		5	–	5	–	0
San Jose State		–		5	–	5	–	0
Xavier		–		5	–	4	–	1
West Texas State		–		4	–	4	–	1
Florida State		–		4	–	5	–	1
Colgate		–		3	–	4	–	1
New Mexico State		–		3	–	6	–	1
Colorado State		–		3	–	7	–	0
Miami (FL)		–		3	–	7	–	0
Texas Western		–		3	–	7	–	0
Detroit		–		2	–	6	–	1
Holy Cross		–		2	–	6	–	1
Notre Dame		–		2	–	7	–	0
Pacific (CA)		–		2	–	8	–	0
Houston		–		2	–	8	–	0
Boston University		–		1	–	6	–	1
Dayton		–		1	–	7	–	2
Rankings from Coaches Poll

The 1963 San Jose State Spartans football team represented San Jose State College—now known as San Jose State University—as an independent during the 1963 NCAA University Division football season. Led by seventh-year head coach Bob Titchenal, the Spartans compiled a record of 5–5 and were outscored by opponents 194 to 187. The team played home games at Spartan Stadium in San Jose, California.

== Schedule ==
Date	Opponent	Site	Result	Attendance	Source
September 21	at Stanford	Stanford Stadium; Stanford, CA (rivalry)	L 13–29	31,000	
September 28	Kansas State	Spartan Stadium; San Jose, CA	W 16–0	17,195	
October 5	at Utah State	Romney Stadium (Note: This stadium is the predecessor to the current Maverik Stadium (Romney Stadium) that has served as the home of the Aggies since 1968); Logan, UT	L 0–20	9,005	
October 12	at Washington State	Rogers Field; Pullman, WA	W 13–8	19,500	
October 19	at California	California Memorial Stadium; Berkeley, CA	L 13–34	37,000	
October 26	at Idaho	Neale Stadium; Moscow, ID	L 12–28	8,700	
November 2	at Oregon	Hayward Field; Eugene, OR	W 13–7	14,000	
November 9	Arizona State^{†}	Spartan Stadium; San Jose, CA	L 19–21	21,000	
November 16	Fresno State	Spartan Stadium; San Jose, CA (rivalry)	W 56–27	8,000	
November 30	Pacific (CA)	Spartan Stadium; San Jose, CA (Victory Bell)	W 32–20	6,000	
^{†}Homecoming; Source:

== Team players in the NFL/AFL ==
No San Jose State players were selected in the 1964 NFL draft or 1964 American Football League draft. The following finished their San Jose State career in 1963, were not drafted, but played in the NFL.

Player	Position	First NFL team
Walter Roberts	Wide receiver – Split end	1964 Cleveland Browns
