= 1963 Houston Cougars football team =

American college football season

1963 Houston Cougars football
- Conference: Independent
- Record: 2–8
- Head coach: Bill Yeoman (2nd season)
- Captains: Clem Beard; Demaree Jones; Frank Brewer
- Home stadium: Rice Stadium

1963 NCAA University Division independents football records
	Conf.			Overall
Team	W	L	T	W		L		T
No. 14 Memphis State		–		9	–	0	–	1
No. 3 Pittsburgh		–		9	–	1	–	0
No. 2 Navy		–		9	–	2	–	0
No. 12 Syracuse		–		8	–	2	–	0
Utah State		–		8	–	2	–	0
Oregon		–		8	–	3	–	0
No. 16 Penn State		–		7	–	3	–	0
Army		–		7	–	3	–	0
Air Force		–		7	–	4	–	0
Boston College		–		6	–	3	–	0
Buffalo		–		5	–	3	–	1
Southern Miss		–		5	–	3	–	1
Villanova		–		5	–	4	–	0
Oregon State		–		5	–	5	–	0
San Jose State		–		5	–	5	–	0
Xavier		–		5	–	4	–	1
West Texas State		–		4	–	4	–	1
Florida State		–		4	–	5	–	1
Colgate		–		3	–	4	–	1
New Mexico State		–		3	–	6	–	1
Colorado State		–		3	–	7	–	0
Miami (FL)		–		3	–	7	–	0
Texas Western		–		3	–	7	–	0
Detroit		–		2	–	6	–	1
Holy Cross		–		2	–	6	–	1
Notre Dame		–		2	–	7	–	0
Pacific (CA)		–		2	–	8	–	0
Houston		–		2	–	8	–	0
Boston University		–		1	–	6	–	1
Dayton		–		1	–	7	–	2
Rankings from Coaches Poll

The 1963 Houston Cougars football team was an American football team that represented the University of Houston as an independent during the 1963 NCAA University Division football season. In its second season under head coach Bill Yeoman, the team compiled a 2–8 record. Clem Beard, Demaree Jones, and Frank Brewer were the team captains. The team played its home games at Rice Stadium in Houston.

The game against Louisville was originally scheduled to be played on November 23, but was postponed to December 14 due to the assassination of John F. Kennedy.

== Schedule ==
Date	Opponent	Site	Result	Attendance	Source
September 21	Auburn	Rice Stadium; Houston, TX	L 14–21	30,000	
September 28	at Baylor	Baylor Stadium; Waco, TX (rivalry)	L 0–27	20,000	
October 5	No. 10 Ole Miss^{†}	Rice Stadium; Houston, TX	L 6–20	30,000	
October 12	at Texas A&M	Kyle Field; College Station, TX	L 13–23	18,500	
October 19	at Mississippi State	Scott Field; Starkville, MS	L 0–20	27,000	
October 26	at No. 6 Alabama	Denny Stadium; Tuscaloosa, AL	L 13–21	28,022	
November 2	Detroit	Rice Stadium; Houston, TX	W 55–18	15,000	
November 16	at Tulsa	Skelly Stadium; Tulsa, OK	L 21–22	5,662	
November 30	at Memphis State	Crump Stadium; Memphis, TN	L 6–29	13,665	
December 14	Louisville	Rice Stadium; Houston, TX	W 21–7	5,000	
^{†}Homecoming; Rankings from AP Poll released prior to the game
