= 1963 Texas Western Miners football team =

American college football season

1963 Texas Western Miners football
- Conference: Independent
- Record: 3–7
- Head coach: Warren Harper (1st season)
- Home stadium: Sun Bowl

1963 NCAA University Division independents football records
| | Conf. | | | Overall |
| Team | W | L | T | W | | L | | T |
|---|---|---|---|---|---|---|---|---|
| No. 14 Memphis State | | – | | 9 | – | 0 | – | 1 |
| No. 3 Pittsburgh | | – | | 9 | – | 1 | – | 0 |
| No. 2 Navy | | – | | 9 | – | 2 | – | 0 |
| No. 12 Syracuse | | – | | 8 | – | 2 | – | 0 |
| Utah State | | – | | 8 | – | 2 | – | 0 |
| Oregon | | – | | 8 | – | 3 | – | 0 |
| No. 16 Penn State | | – | | 7 | – | 3 | – | 0 |
| Army | | – | | 7 | – | 3 | – | 0 |
| Air Force | | – | | 7 | – | 4 | – | 0 |
| Boston College | | – | | 6 | – | 3 | – | 0 |
| Buffalo | | – | | 5 | – | 3 | – | 1 |
| Southern Miss | | – | | 5 | – | 3 | – | 1 |
| Villanova | | – | | 5 | – | 4 | – | 0 |
| Oregon State | | – | | 5 | – | 5 | – | 0 |
| San Jose State | | – | | 5 | – | 5 | – | 0 |
| Xavier | | – | | 5 | – | 4 | – | 1 |
| West Texas State | | – | | 4 | – | 4 | – | 1 |
| Florida State | | – | | 4 | – | 5 | – | 1 |
| Colgate | | – | | 3 | – | 4 | – | 1 |
| New Mexico State | | – | | 3 | – | 6 | – | 1 |
| Colorado State | | – | | 3 | – | 7 | – | 0 |
| Miami (FL) | | – | | 3 | – | 7 | – | 0 |
| Texas Western | | – | | 3 | – | 7 | – | 0 |
| Detroit | | – | | 2 | – | 6 | – | 1 |
| Holy Cross | | – | | 2 | – | 6 | – | 1 |
| Notre Dame | | – | | 2 | – | 7 | – | 0 |
| Pacific (CA) | | – | | 2 | – | 8 | – | 0 |
| Houston | | – | | 2 | – | 8 | – | 0 |
| Boston University | | – | | 1 | – | 6 | – | 1 |
| Dayton | | – | | 1 | – | 7 | – | 2 |
Rankings from Coaches Poll

The 1963 Texas Western Miners football team was an American football team that represented Texas Western College (now University of Texas at El Paso) as an independent during the 1963 NCAA University Division football season. In its first season under head coach Warren Harper, the team played home games on campus at the new Sun Bowl stadium, compiled a 3–7 record, and was outscored 142 to 98.

== Schedule ==
| Date | Opponent | Site | Result | Attendance | Source |
|---|---|---|---|---|---|
| September 21 | North Texas State | Sun Bowl; El Paso, TX | W 34–7 | 14,885–15,158 | |
| September 28 | at New Mexico | University Stadium; Albuquerque, NM | L 7–23 | 26,836 | |
| October 5 | New Mexico State | Sun Bowl; El Paso, TX (rivalry) | W 14–13 | 22,000 | |
| October 12 | at Arizona | Arizona Stadium; Tucson, AZ | L 7–13 | 24,300 | |
| October 19 | Arizona State | Sun Bowl; El Paso, TX | L 0–27 | 13,231 | |
| October 26 | at Colorado State | Colorado Field; Fort Collins, CO | L 14–21 | 10,500 | |
| November 9 | at Xavier | Xavier Stadium; Cincinnati, OH | L 0–24 | 8,281 | |
| November 16 | Texas Tech^{†} | Sun Bowl; El Paso, TX | L 3–7 | 18,400 | |
| November 30 | West Texas State | Sun Bowl; El Paso, TX | W 13–0 | 7,303 | |
| December 7 | Wyoming | Sun Bowl; El Paso, TX | L 6–7 | 7,415 | |
^{†}Homecoming
