= 1963 Southern Miss Southerners football team =

American college football season

1963 Southern Miss Southerners football
- Conference: Independent
- Record: 5–3–1
- Head coach: Thad Vann (15th season)
- Home stadium: Faulkner Field

1963 NCAA University Division independents football records
	Conf.			Overall
Team	W	L	T	W		L		T
No. 14 Memphis State		–		9	–	0	–	1
No. 3 Pittsburgh		–		9	–	1	–	0
No. 2 Navy		–		9	–	2	–	0
No. 12 Syracuse		–		8	–	2	–	0
Utah State		–		8	–	2	–	0
Oregon		–		8	–	3	–	0
No. 16 Penn State		–		7	–	3	–	0
Army		–		7	–	3	–	0
Air Force		–		7	–	4	–	0
Boston College		–		6	–	3	–	0
Buffalo		–		5	–	3	–	1
Southern Miss		–		5	–	3	–	1
Villanova		–		5	–	4	–	0
Oregon State		–		5	–	5	–	0
San Jose State		–		5	–	5	–	0
Xavier		–		5	–	4	–	1
West Texas State		–		4	–	4	–	1
Florida State		–		4	–	5	–	1
Colgate		–		3	–	4	–	1
New Mexico State		–		3	–	6	–	1
Colorado State		–		3	–	7	–	0
Miami (FL)		–		3	–	7	–	0
Texas Western		–		3	–	7	–	0
Detroit		–		2	–	6	–	1
Holy Cross		–		2	–	6	–	1
Notre Dame		–		2	–	7	–	0
Pacific (CA)		–		2	–	8	–	0
Houston		–		2	–	8	–	0
Boston University		–		1	–	6	–	1
Dayton		–		1	–	7	–	2
Rankings from Coaches Poll

The 1963 Southern Miss Southerners football team was an American football team that represented the University of Southern Mississippi as an independent during the 1963 NCAA University Division football season. In their fifteenth year under head coach Thad Vann, the team compiled a 5–3–1 record.

== Schedule ==
Date	Opponent	Site	Result	Attendance	Source
September 14	Memphis State	Mississippi Veterans Memorial Stadium; Jackson, MS (rivalry)	L 7–28	24,000	
September 28	NC State	Faulkner Field; Hattiesburg, MS	L 0–14	11,500	
October 12	Richmond^{†}	Faulkner Field; Hattiesburg, MS	W 7–0	10,000	
October 19	Florida State	Ladd Stadium; Mobile, AL	T 0–0	11,353	
October 26	Arkansas State	Faulkner Field; Hattiesburg, MS	W 25–0	7,500	
November 2	at Southwestern Louisiana	McNaspy Stadium; Lafayette, LA	W 28–0	4,500–6,000	
November 16	at Louisiana Tech	Tech Stadium; Ruston, LA (rivalry)	L 0–10	7,000	
November 23	The Citadel	Faulkner Field; Hattiesburg, MS	W 37–12	4,000	
November 28	at Chattanooga	Chamberlain Field; Chattanooga, TN	W 24–0	6,000	
^{†}Homecoming
