= 1963 Pacific Tigers football team =

American college football season

1963 Pacific Tigers football
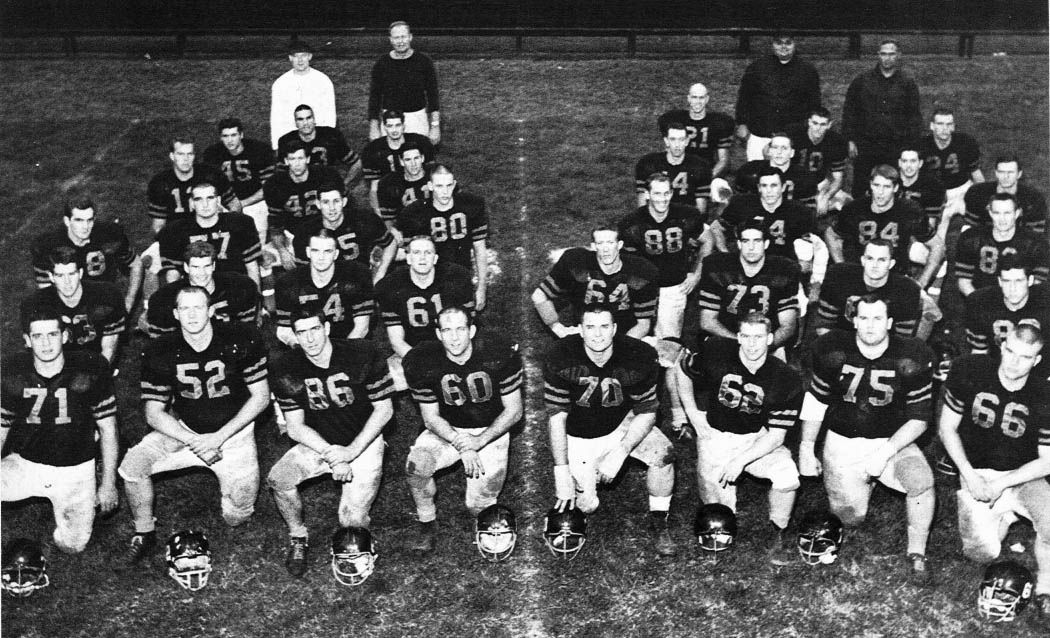
- Conference: Independent
- Record: 2–8
- Head coach: John Rohde (3rd season)
- Captain: Terry Marshburn
- Home stadium: Pacific Memorial Stadium

1963 NCAA University Division independents football records
	Conf.			Overall
Team	W	L	T	W		L		T
No. 14 Memphis State		–		9	–	0	–	1
No. 3 Pittsburgh		–		9	–	1	–	0
No. 2 Navy		–		9	–	2	–	0
No. 12 Syracuse		–		8	–	2	–	0
Utah State		–		8	–	2	–	0
Oregon		–		8	–	3	–	0
No. 16 Penn State		–		7	–	3	–	0
Army		–		7	–	3	–	0
Air Force		–		7	–	4	–	0
Boston College		–		6	–	3	–	0
Buffalo		–		5	–	3	–	1
Southern Miss		–		5	–	3	–	1
Villanova		–		5	–	4	–	0
Oregon State		–		5	–	5	–	0
San Jose State		–		5	–	5	–	0
Xavier		–		5	–	4	–	1
West Texas State		–		4	–	4	–	1
Florida State		–		4	–	5	–	1
Colgate		–		3	–	4	–	1
New Mexico State		–		3	–	6	–	1
Colorado State		–		3	–	7	–	0
Miami (FL)		–		3	–	7	–	0
Texas Western		–		3	–	7	–	0
Detroit		–		2	–	6	–	1
Holy Cross		–		2	–	6	–	1
Notre Dame		–		2	–	7	–	0
Pacific (CA)		–		2	–	8	–	0
Houston		–		2	–	8	–	0
Boston University		–		1	–	6	–	1
Dayton		–		1	–	7	–	2
Rankings from Coaches Poll

The 1963 Pacific Tigers football team represented the University of the Pacific (UOP) as an independent during the 1963 NCAA University Division football season. Led by John Rohde in his third and final season as head coach, the Tigers compiled a record of 2–8 and were outscored by opponents 275 to 99. The team played home games at Pacific Memorial Stadium in Stockton, California.

The 2–8 record was the worst record for the Tigers since they were winless in 1945 season

== Schedule ==
Date	Opponent	Site	Result	Attendance	Source
September 21	Colorado State	Pacific Memorial Stadium; Stockton, CA	L 0–20	10,000	
September 28	at West Texas State	Buffalo Bowl; Canyon, TX	L 8–32	15,932	
October 12	Fresno State^{†}	Pacific Memorial Stadium; Stockton, CA	L 7–29	11,000–14,000	
October 19	at Idaho	Neale Stadium; Moscow, ID	L 6–64	12,000	
October 26	at Utah State	Romney Stadium (Note: This stadium is the predecessor to the current Maverik Stadium (Romney Stadium) that has served as the home of the Aggies since 1968); Logan, UT	L 14–40	11,453	
November 2	San Diego Marines (Note: The Marine Corps Recruit Depot (MCRD) in San Diego fielded a team that played against colleges and other military teams from 1922 to 1964.)	Pacific Memorial Stadium; Stockton, CA	L 6–24	3,000–4,500	
November 9	San Diego State	Pacific Memorial Stadium; Stockton, CA	L 18–34	4,000–4,500	
November 16	BYU	Pacific Memorial Stadium; Stockton, CA	W 14–0	4,700–6,000	
November 30	at San Jose State	Spartan Stadium; San Jose, CA (Victory Bell)	L 20–32	6,000	
December 7	at Hawaii	Honolulu Stadium; Honolulu, HI	W 6–0	8,560	
^{†}Homecoming

== Team players in the AFL/NFL ==
The following University of the Pacific players were selected in the 1964 NFL draft.

Player	Position	Round	Overall	NFL team
Don Shackelford	Guard	4	54	Cleveland Browns

The following University of the Pacific players were selected in the 1964 AFL draft.

Player	Position	Round	Overall	AFL team
Don Shackelford	Guard	6	41	Denver Broncos

The following finished their college career at Pacific, were not drafted, but played in the AFL starting with the 1964 season.

Player	Position	First AFL team
Norm Bass	Defensive back	1964 Denver Broncos
