= 1963 Holy Cross Crusaders football team =

American college football season

1963 Holy Cross Crusaders football
- Conference: Independent
- Record: 2–6–1
- Head coach: Eddie Anderson (20th season)
- Captain: Jon N. Morris
- Home stadium: Fitton Field

1963 NCAA University Division independents football records
	Conf.			Overall
Team	W	L	T	W		L		T
No. 14 Memphis State		–		9	–	0	–	1
No. 3 Pittsburgh		–		9	–	1	–	0
No. 2 Navy		–		9	–	2	–	0
No. 12 Syracuse		–		8	–	2	–	0
Utah State		–		8	–	2	–	0
Oregon		–		8	–	3	–	0
No. 16 Penn State		–		7	–	3	–	0
Army		–		7	–	3	–	0
Air Force		–		7	–	4	–	0
Boston College		–		6	–	3	–	0
Buffalo		–		5	–	3	–	1
Southern Miss		–		5	–	3	–	1
Villanova		–		5	–	4	–	0
Oregon State		–		5	–	5	–	0
San Jose State		–		5	–	5	–	0
Xavier		–		5	–	4	–	1
West Texas State		–		4	–	4	–	1
Florida State		–		4	–	5	–	1
Colgate		–		3	–	4	–	1
New Mexico State		–		3	–	6	–	1
Colorado State		–		3	–	7	–	0
Miami (FL)		–		3	–	7	–	0
Texas Western		–		3	–	7	–	0
Detroit		–		2	–	6	–	1
Holy Cross		–		2	–	6	–	1
Notre Dame		–		2	–	7	–	0
Pacific (CA)		–		2	–	8	–	0
Houston		–		2	–	8	–	0
Boston University		–		1	–	6	–	1
Dayton		–		1	–	7	–	2
Rankings from Coaches Poll

The 1963 Holy Cross Crusaders football team was an American football team that represented the College of the Holy Cross as an independent during the 1963 NCAA University Division football season. Eddie Anderson returned for the 14th consecutive year as head coach, his 20th year overall. The team compiled a record of 2–6–1.

All home games were played at Fitton Field on the Holy Cross campus in Worcester, Massachusetts.

== Schedule ==
Date	Opponent	Site	Result	Attendance	Source
September 28	Buffalo	Fitton Field; Worcester, MA	T 6–6	12,000	
October 5	at Syracuse	Archbold Stadium; Syracuse, NY	L 0–48	22,000	
October 12	Boston University^{†}	Fitton Field; Worcester, MA	L 6–18	14,000	
October 19	at Dartmouth	Memorial Field; Hanover, NH	L 8–13	13,909	
October 26	Quantico Marines^	Fitton Field; Worcester, MA	L 6–7	10,000	
November 2	at Villanova	Villanova Stadium; Villanova, PA	L 14–22	10,000	
November 9	VMI	Fitton Field; Worcester, MA	W 14–12	7,500	
November 16	at Penn State	Beaver Stadium; University Park, PA	L 14–28	24,200	
November 23	at Connecticut	Memorial Stadium (Storrs); Storrs, CT	Cancelled		
November 30	Boston College	Fitton Field; Worcester, MA (rivalry)	W 9–0	25,000	
^{†}Homecoming; ^ Family Weekend

== Statistical leaders ==
Statistical leaders for the 1963 Crusaders included:

- Rushing: Jim Marcellino, 406 yards and 1 touchdown on 105 attempts
- Passing: Fran Coughlin, 486 yards, 36 completions and 3 touchdowns on 79 attempts
- Receiving: Jim Marcellino, 277 yards and 1 touchdown on 21 receptions
- Scoring: Fran Coughlin and Jim Gravel (tie), each with 14 points from 2 touchdowns and 1 two-point conversion
- Total offense: Fran Coughlin, 517 yards (486 passing, 31 rushing)
- All-purpose yards: Jim Marcellino, 939 yards (406 rushing, 277 receiving, 256 returning)
