= 1963 Buffalo Bulls football team =

American college football season

1963 Buffalo Bulls football
- Conference: Independent
- Record: 5–3–1
- Head coach: Dick Offenhamer (9th season)
- Captains: Gerry Philbin; Larry Gergley
- Home stadium: Rotary Field

1963 NCAA University Division independents football records
| | Conf. | | | Overall |
| Team | W | L | T | W | | L | | T |
|---|---|---|---|---|---|---|---|---|
| No. 14 Memphis State | | – | | 9 | – | 0 | – | 1 |
| No. 3 Pittsburgh | | – | | 9 | – | 1 | – | 0 |
| No. 2 Navy | | – | | 9 | – | 2 | – | 0 |
| No. 12 Syracuse | | – | | 8 | – | 2 | – | 0 |
| Utah State | | – | | 8 | – | 2 | – | 0 |
| Oregon | | – | | 8 | – | 3 | – | 0 |
| No. 16 Penn State | | – | | 7 | – | 3 | – | 0 |
| Army | | – | | 7 | – | 3 | – | 0 |
| Air Force | | – | | 7 | – | 4 | – | 0 |
| Boston College | | – | | 6 | – | 3 | – | 0 |
| Buffalo | | – | | 5 | – | 3 | – | 1 |
| Southern Miss | | – | | 5 | – | 3 | – | 1 |
| Villanova | | – | | 5 | – | 4 | – | 0 |
| Oregon State | | – | | 5 | – | 5 | – | 0 |
| San Jose State | | – | | 5 | – | 5 | – | 0 |
| Xavier | | – | | 5 | – | 4 | – | 1 |
| West Texas State | | – | | 4 | – | 4 | – | 1 |
| Florida State | | – | | 4 | – | 5 | – | 1 |
| Colgate | | – | | 3 | – | 4 | – | 1 |
| New Mexico State | | – | | 3 | – | 6 | – | 1 |
| Colorado State | | – | | 3 | – | 7 | – | 0 |
| Miami (FL) | | – | | 3 | – | 7 | – | 0 |
| Texas Western | | – | | 3 | – | 7 | – | 0 |
| Detroit | | – | | 2 | – | 6 | – | 1 |
| Holy Cross | | – | | 2 | – | 6 | – | 1 |
| Notre Dame | | – | | 2 | – | 7 | – | 0 |
| Pacific (CA) | | – | | 2 | – | 8 | – | 0 |
| Houston | | – | | 2 | – | 8 | – | 0 |
| Boston University | | – | | 1 | – | 6 | – | 1 |
| Dayton | | – | | 1 | – | 7 | – | 2 |
Rankings from Coaches Poll

The 1963 Buffalo Bulls football team represented the University at Buffalo as an independent during the 1963 NCAA University Division football season. Led by ninth-year head coach Dick Offenhamer, the Bulls compiled a record of 5–3–1. The team's offense scored 120 points while the defense allowed 85 points. Buffalo played home games at Rotary Field in Buffalo, New York.

== Schedule ==
| Date | Opponent | Site | Result | Attendance | Source |
|---|---|---|---|---|---|
| September 14 | Gettysburg | Rotary Field; Buffalo, NY | W 34–0 | 9,097 | |
| September 21 | at Ohio | Peden Stadium; Athens, OH | W 7–0 | 11,000 | |
| September 28 | at Holy Cross | Fitton Field; Worcester, MA | T 6–6 | 12,000 | |
| October 5 | at Villanova | Villanova Stadium; Villanova, PA | W 14–7 | 12,500 | |
| October 12 | Marshall | Rotary Field; Buffalo, NY | L 8–10 | 10,326 | |
| October 19 | Boston University^{†} | Rotary Field; Buffalo, NY | W 22–13 | 11,466 | |
| November 2 | at Delaware | Delaware Stadium; Newark, DE | L 6–34 | 10,500 | |
| November 9 | at Boston College | Alumni Stadium; Chestnut Hill, MA | L 0–15 | 13,650 | |
| November 16 | Colgate | Rotary Field; Buffalo, NY | W 23–0 | 10,943 | |
^{†}Homecoming; Source:

== After the season ==
=== NFL draft ===
The following Bull was selected in the 1964 NFL draft following the season.

| Round | Pick | Player | Position | NFL club |
|---|---|---|---|---|
| 3 | 33 | Gerry Philbin | Tackle | Detroit Lions |
