= Canyon News (Texas) =

Newspaper in Canyon, Texas, US

- Owner(s): Hearst Newspapers
- Publisher: Robert C. Granfeldt
- Editor: Tim Ritter
- Founded: 1896 (as The Stayer)
- Headquarters: 1500 5th Ave. Canyon, TX 79015
- Circulation: 652 (as of 2023)
- Website: www.canyonnews.com

The Canyon News is a newspaper in Canyon, Texas.

== History ==
Canyon News was founded in 1896 as "The Stayer". It was later called "The Randall County News" and was called "Canyon News" by the early 1900s.
