= 1963 NCAA University Division football season =

American college football season

- Preseason AP No. 1: USC
- Regular season: September 20 – December 7, 1963
- Number of bowls: 8
- Bowl games: December 21, 1963 – January 1, 1964
- Champion(s): Texas (AP, Coaches, FWAA, NFF)
- Heisman: Navy quarterback Roger Staubach

The 1963 NCAA University Division football season was played by American football teams representing 120 colleges and universities recognized the National Collegiate Athletic Association (NCAA) as major programs. The remaining 299 colleges and universities that were NCAA members and fielded football teams competed in the 1963 NCAA College Division football season.

The 1963 Texas Longhorns football team compiled a perfect 11–0 record, won the Southwest Conference championship, and defeated No. 2 Navy in the Cotton Bowl. The Longhorns were the consensus national champion as chosen by 16 selectors, including the Associated Press poll, United Press International poll, Football Writers Association of America (FWAA), and the National Championship Foundation. Quarterback Duke Carlisle was the team's most valuable player, and tailback Tommy Ford led the team in rushing and was a first-team All-American. Defensive tackle Scott Appleton won the Outland Trophy, and head coach Darrell Royal won the Coach of the Year Award from both the FWAA and the American Football Coaches Association.

Navy quarterback Roger Staubach won the Heisman Trophy and the Maxwell Award as the best player in college football. Baylor quarterback Don Trull led the University Division with 2,157 passing yards and won the Sammy Baugh Trophy. Other University Division leaders included Memphis State fullback Dave Casinelli (1,016 rushing yards), Kansas halfback Gale Sayers (1,072 yards from scrimmage), Baylor end Lawrence Elkins (873 receiving yards), and Maryland's Darryl Hill (90 points scored). Hill was the first African-American football player in any of the southern athletic conferences composed of formerly segregated white institutions.

== Conference and program changes ==
- The Big Sky Conference began its first season of play in 1963 in the College Division with four founding members, all independents, from Idaho, Montana, and Utah.

School	1962 Conference	1963 Conference
Louisville Cardinals	Independent	Missouri Valley
Idaho State Bengals	Independent	Big Sky
Montana Grizzlies	Independent	Big Sky
Montana State Bobcats	Independent	Big Sky
Weber State Wildcats	Independent	Big Sky

- The Idaho Vandals were also charter members of the Big Sky, but remained independent in football until 1965 and retained University Division status.

== September ==
In the preseason poll released on September 16, the defending champion USC Trojans were first, followed by Southeastern Conference (SEC) rivals, the Ole Miss Rebels and the Alabama Crimson Tide at second and third. The Oklahoma Sooners were fourth and the Texas Longhorns were next.

On a Friday night game in New Orleans, No. 5 Texas beat hapless Tulane 21–0 with the help of its "shoeless kicker", Tony Crosby and halfback Phil Harris. The next day, September 21, No. 1 USC shut out Colorado on a muddy field at Boulder, 14–0, with the Trojans' Pete Beathard running for two scores. No. 2 Ole Miss was held to a scoreless tie at Memphis State, and the result was enough to take the Rebels out of the poll. No. 3 Alabama won at Georgia, 32–7, and after falling behind 14-0 at home, No. 4 Oklahoma rallied to beat Clemson 31–14. In the poll that followed, the results were No. 1 USC, No. 2 Alabama, No. 3 Oklahoma, and No. 4 Texas, with Navy moving from ninth to fifth on the strength of a 51–7 win at West Virginia.

On September 28, No. 1 USC was beaten at home at the Los Angeles Coliseum by No. 3 Oklahoma, 17–12, in a game played in 105 °F (41 °C) heat. Tulane, which had been shut out by Texas the week before, went scoreless again in a 28–0 loss to No. 2 Alabama. No. 4 Texas defeated Texas Tech at home, 49–7. No. 5 Navy shut out William & Mary at Annapolis, 28–0. In the poll, Oklahoma took over first place, Alabama stayed at second, and Texas moved up to third. Big Ten rivals Northwestern (winning 34–21 over Indiana) and Wisconsin (which beat Notre Dame 14–9 at South Bend) tied at No. 4, while Navy moved down to sixth.

== October ==
Both No. 1 Oklahoma and No. 4 Wisconsin were idle on October 5. No. 3 Texas beat Oklahoma State at home, 34–7. No. 2 Alabama beat Vanderbilt in Nashville, 21–6. No. 4 Northwestern lost at Illinois, 10–9, due to a missed extra point and a bad punt that went only five yards and set up the Illini's touchdown. Jim Plankenhorn connected on a point after and a field goal. When the poll was released the Sooners were No. 1 and the Longhorns No. 2 as the two teams prepared to meet in Dallas. Alabama fell to No. 3, Navy rose from 6th place to 4th with a 26–13 win at Michigan, and Wisconsin dropped to No. 5.

Three of the top four teams played at the Cotton Bowl stadium in Dallas the next weekend. In a Friday night game, No. 4 Navy lost to SMU 32–28. After Navy had gone ahead 28–26 in the final three minutes, a pass interference call set up the Mustangs' touchdown. Roger Staubach drove his team to the 7-yard line with :01 to play, but his pass attempt was batted down in the end zone by Tommy Caughren. Hours later on October 12, at the same venue, No. 1 Oklahoma played against No. 2 Texas before a crowd of 75,504. Texas won the game 28–7 to take over the top ranking. Third-ranked Alabama lost on its home field to unranked Florida, 10–6. Joe Namath scored for the Tide with 2:05 left, but tries for the 2-point conversion and an onside kick both failed. No. 5 Wisconsin hosted Purdue, winning 38–20. No. 8 Ohio State, which had shut out its first two opponents, tied Illinois 20–20. No. 6 Pittsburgh and No. 10 Mississippi were both idle, but moved into the top five after the string of losses by higher-ranked teams. The next poll was No. 1 Texas, No. 2 Wisconsin, No. 3 Pittsburgh, No. 4 Ohio State, and No. 5 Mississippi.

In Week Five (October 19, the top three teams managed narrow wins. Halfback Tommy Ford ran for two scores to help No. 1 Texas beat Arkansas at Little Rock, 17–13. No. 2 Wisconsin won 10–7 at Iowa, as Paul Krause of the Hawkeyes went for a win instead of a tie with 99 seconds left, and was stopped a foot short of a first down after a fake field goal attempt, and the No. 3 Pitt Panthers came from behind to beat West Virginia, 13–10. Previously unbeaten No. 4 Ohio State was crushed by USC at before 63,883 fans in Los Angeles, 32–3. No. 5 Ole Miss became the third Top Five team to shut out Tulane, 21–0, a team that went scoreless in six games in 1963 and finished at 1–8–1. Ohio State's Big Ten rival, No. 7 Illinois, beat Minnesota 16–6 and replaced the Buckeyes in the next poll: No. 1 Texas, No. 2 Wisconsin, No. 3 Pittsburgh, No. 4 Illinois, and No. 5 Mississippi.

Week Six began with a Friday night 18–12 come-from-behind win by No. 4 Illinois over UCLA at Los Angeles. The next day, October 26, No. 1 Texas beat Rice at home, 10–6, as Tommy Nobis blocked an extra point, and shoeless Tony Crosby made a field goal. No. 2 Wisconsin lost 13–10 to Ohio State at home, when Matt Snell drove over for a score with 2:13 left. Roger Staubach's passing and a defense that made four interceptions drove No. 10 Navy to a 24–12 upset of No. 3 Pittsburgh at Annapolis. No. 5 Mississippi beat Vanderbilt 27–7. Texas remained at No. 1 in the next poll, followed by No. 2 Illinois, No. 3 Mississippi, No. 4 Navy, and No. 5 Auburn, which moved from eighth to fifth despite being idle that week.

== November ==
On November 2, all of the top five teams won. No. 1 Texas stayed unbeaten by defeating SMU at Dallas, 17–12, as Crosby made his 21st consecutive point after. No. 2 Illinois rolled over Purdue at home, 41–21 as Jim Grabowski scored three touchdowns and No. 3 Ole Miss overwhelmed LSU 37–3 at Baton Rouge. No. 4 Navy handed Notre Dame its second straight loss on Staubach's passing, 35–14 in South Bend and No. 5 Auburn won at home over Florida, 19–0. The poll remained unchanged.

November 9, No. 1 Texas won its eighth straight, 7–0, by shutting down Baylor's passing game. Longhorns QB Duke Carlisle, playing on defense, intercepted Don Trull's end zone pass with 22 seconds to play, then ran out the clock. Previously unbeaten No. 2 Illinois had an 8–7 lead with minutes left in a game at home against Michigan, when a fumble gave the Wolverines the ball 11 yards from the goal line, setting up Mel Anthony's winning score for a 14–8 upset. No. 3 Mississippi shut out visiting Tampa, 41-0, No. 4 Navy mauled Maryland 42–7 at home, and No. 5 Auburn fell 13–10 to Mississippi State at Jackson. No. 6 Oklahoma defeated Iowa State 24–14, while No. 9 Michigan State shut out Purdue 23–0. Texas, the only major team to remain unbeaten and untied, kept the No. 1 spot, followed by No. 2 Navy, No. 3 Mississippi, No. 4 Michigan State, and No. 5 Oklahoma.

November 16, No. 1 Texas went to 9–0 with a 17–0 home win over TCU. No. 2 Navy won 38–25 at Duke and No. 3 Mississippi shut out Tennessee, 20–0, at a game in Memphis. No. 4 Michigan State was trailing Notre Dame 7–6 at home in the fourth quarter, but Sherm Lewis ran 85 yards from scrimmage to win the game, 12–7. Both of the Spartans' two-point attempts failed. No. 5 Oklahoma won at Missouri 13–3, but dropped to sixth and was replaced by Pittsburgh (which had trounced Army, 28–0) at the fifth spot. Texas, Navy, Ole Miss, and Michigan State stayed at the top four spots.

Most of the games that had been scheduled for November 23, 1963 were canceled or postponed after the assassination of President Kennedy the day before. North Carolina State had played a Friday night game against Wake Forest, winning 42–0, and the Big Ten games were set to continue until Michigan Governor George Romney received a Saturday morning cancellation from Big Ten commissioner Bill Reed. The Pitt-Penn State game was postponed. The annual Oklahoma-Nebraska game, which would determine the Big Eight championship and an Orange Bowl berth, was played as scheduled in Lincoln. No. 10 Nebraska won 29–20 over No. 6 Oklahoma, finishing 7–0 in Big 8 play ahead of the 6–1 Sooners. The same day, No. 9 Auburn beat Florida State 21–15. In the Battle for the Rag, LSU defeated Tulane 20–0 in the most recent daytime game at Tiger Stadium not to be televised. Tennessee beat Kentucky 19-0. The top five in the AP poll remained the same.

On Thanksgiving Day (November 28), No. 1 Texas traveled to College Station to face Texas A&M, and were down 13–9 with only minutes left in the game, when Tommy Wade's pass was picked off by A&M's John Bortheron. Bortheron fumbled, however, and Texas recovered on the 44 to continue the drive. Duke Carlisle scored the winning touchdown with 1:19 left, and the Longhorns won 15–13 to finish with a 10–0–0 record. No. 4 Michigan State lost 13–0 at home to No. 8 Illinois in a game that determined the Big Ten championship. The Illini, who had gone 0–9–0 two years earlier, finished 7–1–1 in 1963. With a 5–1–1 conference record, Illinois earned a trip to the Rose Bowl, while the Spartans' season ended with a 4–1–1 second-place finish

November 30 saw unbeaten No. 3 Mississippi go for a field goal and a tie against Mississippi State, rather than to try for a touchdown from the 3-yard line on fourth down. Billy Carl Irwin's 20-yard field goal gave the Rebels a 10–10 tie, sufficient to avoid embarrassment and give the Rebels an unbeaten 7–0–2 record, a 19-game streak without a loss, and the SEC championship. After the game, Ole Miss accepted an invitation to play against fellow SEC member Alabama in the Sugar Bowl. The No. 5 Pittsburgh Panthers beat the Miami Hurricanes in Florida, 31–20. In the subsequent poll Texas and Navy remained at No. 1 and No. 2, Illinois was No. 3, and Pitt rose to No. 4. The No. 9 Auburn Tigers, who had beaten No. 6 Alabama 10–8 at Birmingham, rose to fifth place and earned an Orange Bowl berth against Nebraska.

On December 7, No. 4 Pitt beat Penn State 22–21. Also, No. 2 Navy played in the annual Army–Navy Game in Philadelphia. American television viewers were introduced to instant replay after Army's quarterback Rollie Stichweh scored on a two-yard run for the game's first score. CBS commentator Lindsey Nelson had to explain to the home audience that they were not watching Army score again, saying "Ladies and gentlemen, what you are seeing is a tape of Army's touchdown. This is not live ...". Staubach went on to lead Navy to a 21–15 win, after which the players then voted to accept an invitation to play No. 1 Texas in the Cotton Bowl. In the final AP Poll, the top five remained unchanged, confirming a showdown between the No. 1 and No. 2 teams in Dallas.

== Conference standings ==
1963 Athletic Association of Western Universities football standings
	Conf.					Overall
Team	W		L		T	W		L		T
Washington $	4	–	1	–	0	6	–	5	–	0
USC	3	–	1	–	0	7	–	3	–	0
UCLA	2	–	2	–	0	2	–	8	–	0
Washington State	1	–	1	–	0	3	–	6	–	1
California	1	–	3	–	0	4	–	5	–	1
Stanford	1	–	4	–	0	3	–	7	–	0
$ – Conference champion

1963 Atlantic Coast Conference football standings
	Conf.					Overall
Team	W		L		T	W		L		T
North Carolina +	6	–	1	–	0	9	–	2	–	0
NC State +	6	–	1	–	0	8	–	3	–	0
Clemson	5	–	2	–	0	5	–	4	–	1
Duke	5	–	2	–	0	5	–	4	–	1
Maryland	2	–	5	–	0	3	–	7	–	0
South Carolina	1	–	5	–	1	1	–	8	–	1
Wake Forest	1	–	5	–	0	1	–	9	–	0
Virginia	0	–	5	–	1	2	–	7	–	1
+ – Conference co-champions; Rankings from AP Poll

1963 Big Eight Conference football standings
	Conf.					Overall
Team	W		L		T	W		L		T
No. 6 Nebraska $	7	–	0	–	0	10	–	1	–	0
No. 9 Oklahoma	6	–	1	–	0	8	–	2	–	0
Missouri	5	–	2	–	0	7	–	3	–	0
Kansas	3	–	4	–	0	5	–	5	–	0
Iowa State	3	–	4	–	0	4	–	5	–	0
Colorado	2	–	5	–	0	2	–	8	–	0
Kansas State	1	–	5	–	0	2	–	7	–	0
Oklahoma State	0	–	6	–	0	1	–	8	–	0
$ – Conference champion; Rankings from AP Poll

1963 Big Sky Conference football standings
	Conf.					Overall
Team	W		L		T	W		L		T
Idaho State $	3	–	1	–	0	5	–	3	–	0
Montana State	2	–	1	–	0	6	–	3	–	0
Weber State	1	–	2	–	0	6	–	3	–	0
Montana	0	–	3	–	0	1	–	9	–	0
Idaho *	1	–	0	–	0	5	–	4	–	0
$ – Conference champion; * – Insufficient number of games for conference championship

1963 Big Ten Conference football standings
	Conf.					Overall
Team	W		L		T	W		L		T
No. 3 Illinois $	5	–	1	–	1	8	–	1	–	1
No. 9 Michigan State	4	–	1	–	1	6	–	2	–	1
Ohio State	4	–	1	–	1	5	–	3	–	1
Purdue	4	–	3	–	0	5	–	4	–	0
Northwestern	3	–	4	–	0	5	–	4	–	0
Wisconsin	3	–	4	–	0	5	–	4	–	0
Michigan	2	–	3	–	2	3	–	4	–	2
Iowa	2	–	3	–	1	3	–	3	–	2
Minnesota	2	–	5	–	0	3	–	6	–	0
Indiana	1	–	5	–	0	3	–	6	–	0
$ – Conference champion; Rankings from AP Poll

1963 Ivy League football standings
	Conf.					Overall
Team	W		L		T	W		L		T
Dartmouth +	5	–	2	–	0	7	–	2	–	0
Princeton +	5	–	2	–	0	7	–	2	–	0
Harvard	4	–	2	–	1	5	–	2	–	2
Yale	4	–	3	–	0	6	–	3	–	0
Cornell	4	–	3	–	0	5	–	4	–	0
Columbia	2	–	4	–	1	4	–	4	–	1
Brown	2	–	5	–	0	3	–	5	–	0
Penn	1	–	6	–	0	3	–	6	–	0
+ – Conference co-champions

1963 Mid-American Conference football standings
	Conf.					Overall
Team	W		L		T	W		L		T
Ohio $	5	–	1	–	0	6	–	4	–	0
Miami (OH)	4	–	1	–	1	5	–	3	–	2
Bowling Green	4	–	2	–	0	8	–	2	–	0
Marshall	3	–	2	–	1	5	–	4	–	1
Western Michigan	2	–	4	–	0	2	–	7	–	0
Kent State	1	–	5	–	0	3	–	5	–	1
Toledo	1	–	5	–	0	2	–	7	–	0
$ – Conference champion

1963 Middle Three Conference football standings
	Conf.					Overall
Team	W		L		T	W		L		T
Rutgers $	2	–	0	–	0	3	–	6	–	0
Lehigh	1	–	1	–	0	1	–	8	–	0
Lafayette	0	–	2	–	0	1	–	8	–	0
$ – Conference champion

1963 Missouri Valley Conference football standings
	Conf.					Overall
Team	W		L		T	W		L		T
Wichita +	3	–	1	–	0	7	–	2	–	0
Cincinnati +	3	–	1	–	0	6	–	4	–	0
Tulsa	2	–	2	–	0	5	–	5	–	0
North Texas State	2	–	2	–	0	3	–	6	–	0
Louisville	1	–	3	–	0	3	–	7	–	0
+ – Conference co-champions; Cincinnati and Louisville's games against Dayton counted in the conference standings.

1963 Southeastern Conference football standings
	Conf.					Overall
Team	W		L		T	W		L		T
No. 7 Ole Miss $	5	–	0	–	1	7	–	1	–	2
No. 5 Auburn	6	–	1	–	0	9	–	2	–	0
No. 8 Alabama	6	–	2	–	0	9	–	2	–	0
Mississippi State	4	–	1	–	2	7	–	2	–	2
LSU	4	–	2	–	0	7	–	4	–	0
Georgia Tech	4	–	3	–	0	7	–	3	–	0
Florida	3	–	3	–	1	6	–	3	–	1
Tennessee	3	–	5	–	0	5	–	5	–	0
Georgia	2	–	4	–	0	4	–	5	–	1
Vanderbilt	0	–	5	–	2	1	–	7	–	2
Kentucky	0	–	5	–	1	3	–	6	–	1
Tulane	0	–	6	–	1	1	–	8	–	1
$ – Conference champion; Rankings from AP Poll

1963 Southern Conference football standings
	Conf.					Overall
Team	W		L		T	W		L		T
Virginia Tech $	5	–	0	–	0	8	–	2	–	0
West Virginia	3	–	1	–	0	4	–	6	–	0
VMI	3	–	1	–	2	3	–	5	–	2
Furman	3	–	2	–	0	7	–	3	–	0
William & Mary	4	–	4	–	0	4	–	6	–	0
Richmond	2	–	2	–	1	3	–	6	–	1
The Citadel	2	–	4	–	0	4	–	6	–	0
George Washington	1	–	5	–	0	2	–	7	–	0
Davidson	0	–	4	–	1	1	–	5	–	2
$ – Conference champion

1963 Southwest Conference football standings
	Conf.					Overall
Team	W		L		T	W		L		T
No. 1 Texas $	7	–	0	–	0	11	–	0	–	0
Baylor	6	–	1	–	0	8	–	3	–	0
Rice	4	–	3	–	0	6	–	4	–	0
Arkansas	3	–	4	–	0	5	–	5	–	0
TCU	2	–	4	–	1	4	–	5	–	1
Texas Tech	2	–	5	–	0	5	–	5	–	0
SMU	2	–	5	–	0	4	–	7	–	0
Texas A&M	1	–	5	–	1	2	–	7	–	1
$ – Conference champion; Rankings from AP Poll

1963 Western Athletic Conference football standings
	Conf.					Overall
Team	W		L		T	W		L		T
Arizona State *	3	–	0	–	0	8	–	1	–	0
New Mexico $	3	–	1	–	0	6	–	4	–	0
Arizona	2	–	2	–	0	5	–	5	–	0
Utah	2	–	2	–	0	4	–	6	–	0
Wyoming	2	–	3	–	0	6	–	4	–	0
BYU	0	–	4	–	0	2	–	8	–	0
$ – Conference champion; * – Ineligible for conference title due to playing fewer than qualifying number of games

1963 NCAA University Division independents football records
	Conf.			Overall
Team	W	L	T	W		L		T
No. 14 Memphis State		–		9	–	0	–	1
No. 3 Pittsburgh		–		9	–	1	–	0
No. 2 Navy		–		9	–	2	–	0
No. 12 Syracuse		–		8	–	2	–	0
Utah State		–		8	–	2	–	0
Oregon		–		8	–	3	–	0
No. 16 Penn State		–		7	–	3	–	0
Army		–		7	–	3	–	0
Air Force		–		7	–	4	–	0
Boston College		–		6	–	3	–	0
Buffalo		–		5	–	3	–	1
Southern Miss		–		5	–	3	–	1
Villanova		–		5	–	4	–	0
Oregon State		–		5	–	5	–	0
San Jose State		–		5	–	5	–	0
Xavier		–		5	–	4	–	1
West Texas State		–		4	–	4	–	1
Florida State		–		4	–	5	–	1
Colgate		–		3	–	4	–	1
New Mexico State		–		3	–	6	–	1
Colorado State		–		3	–	7	–	0
Miami (FL)		–		3	–	7	–	0
Texas Western		–		3	–	7	–	0
Detroit		–		2	–	6	–	1
Holy Cross		–		2	–	6	–	1
Notre Dame		–		2	–	7	–	0
Pacific (CA)		–		2	–	8	–	0
Houston		–		2	–	8	–	0
Boston University		–		1	–	6	–	1
Dayton		–		1	–	7	–	2
Rankings from Coaches Poll

== Bowl games ==
=== Major bowls ===
Wednesday, January 1, 1964

Bowl				
COTTON	No. 1 Texas Longhorns	28	No. 2 Navy Midshipmen	7
ORANGE	No. 6 Nebraska Cornhuskers	13	No. 5 Auburn Tigers	7
SUGAR	No. 8 Alabama Crimson Tide	12	No. 7 Mississippi Rebels	7
ROSE	No. 3 Illinois Fighting Illini	17	No. 15 Washington Huskies	7

Despite a 9–1 record and a No. 4 ranking, the Pitt Panthers were not invited to a post-season bowl game. The bowls, who feared inviting Pitt before their postponed season finale against Penn State, signed other teams, leaving Pitt without a bowl invitation. The 1963 Panthers were perhaps the best team of the modern football era to be snubbed by the bowls. When they did beat Penn State on December 7, it was too late. The Sugar Bowl selected a second SEC team, third-place finisher Alabama, to face SEC champ Ole Miss, while 2nd place Auburn was picked by the Orange Bowl to meet Big 8 champion Nebraska. The Rose Bowl pitted Big Ten titlist Illinois against unranked Washington, which was 6–4 overall but which had won the AAWU crown by going 4–1 in conference play.

In the Cotton Bowl, the Longhorns' Duke Carlisle guided Texas to a score six plays after kickoff and to a 21–0 lead by halftime. Navy's Roger Staubach saw a second defeat at Dallas (after an earlier loss to SMU), but would go on to a remarkable career there in the NFL. Staubach ran two yards for a touchdown late in the game in the 28–6 loss. Navy head coach Wayne Hardin said after the game that there was "no team more deserving of being No. 1 than Texas." Alabama won the Sugar Bowl 12–7 on four field goals by Tim Davis, including 46 and 48 yards. Auburn drove down to the 11-yard line with 90 seconds left, but Nebraska batted down Jimmy Sidle's 4th down pass attempt to preserve a 13–7 win. And after taking a 7–3 lead at halftime, on a touchdown by Dave Kopay, Washington fell to a comeback attempt led by All-Americans Jim Grabowski and Dick Butkus in the Rose Bowl.

=== Other bowls ===
BOWL	Location	Date	Winner	Score	Runner-up
SUN	El Paso, TX	December 31	Oregon	21–14	SMU
GATOR	Jacksonville, FL	December 28	No. 19 North Carolina	35–0	Air Force
BLUEBONNET	Houston, TX	December 21	No. 20 Baylor	14–7	LSU
LIBERTY	Philadelphia, PA	December 21	No. 11 Mississippi State	16–12	N.C. State

- Prior to the 1975 season, the Big Ten and Pac-8 (AAWU) conferences allowed only one postseason participant each, for the Rose Bowl.
- This was the final Liberty Bowl in Philadelphia; it was played indoors in Atlantic City in 1964, then relocated to Memphis.

== Heisman Trophy voting ==
The Heisman Trophy is given to the year's most outstanding player

Player	School	Position	1st	2nd	3rd	Total
Roger Staubach	Navy	QB	517	132	45	1,860
Billy Lothridge	Georgia Tech	QB	65	119	71	504
Sherman Lewis	Michigan State	HB	53	80	50	369
Don Trull	Baylor	QB	20	68	57	253
Scott Appleton	Texas	OT	27	33	47	194
Dick Butkus	Illinois	C	10	49	44	172
Jimmy Sidle	Auburn	QB	11	28	34	123
Terry Isaacson	Air Force	HB	17	20	13	104
Jay Wilkinson	Duke	HB	3	20	35	84
George Mira	Miami (FL)	QB	6	16	30	80

== See also ==
- 1963 NCAA University Division football rankings
- 1963 College Football All-America Team
- 1963 NCAA College Division football season
- 1963 NAIA football season
