= Bluebonnet Bowl =

Annual college football bowl game played in Houston, Texas 1959-1987

Bluebonnet Bowl (defunct)
- Stadium: Astrodome
- Location: Houston, Texas
- Previous stadiums: Rice Stadium (1959–1967, 1985–1986)
- Operated: 1959–1987
- Succeeded by: Houston Bowl (2000)

Sponsors
- None

Former names
- Astro-Bluebonnet Bowl (1968–1984, 1987)

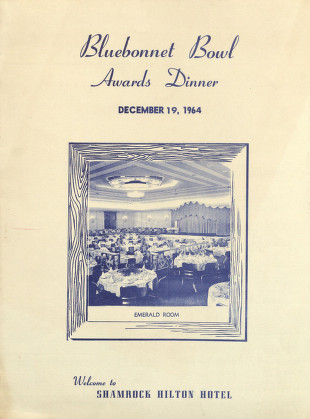
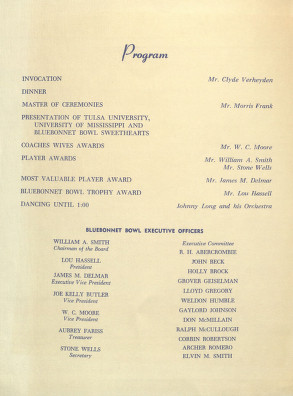
Bluebonnet Bowl Awards dinner program and menu, Shamrock Hotel, Houston, Texas – Tulsa University v. University of Mississippi, 1964 (12-19-1964)

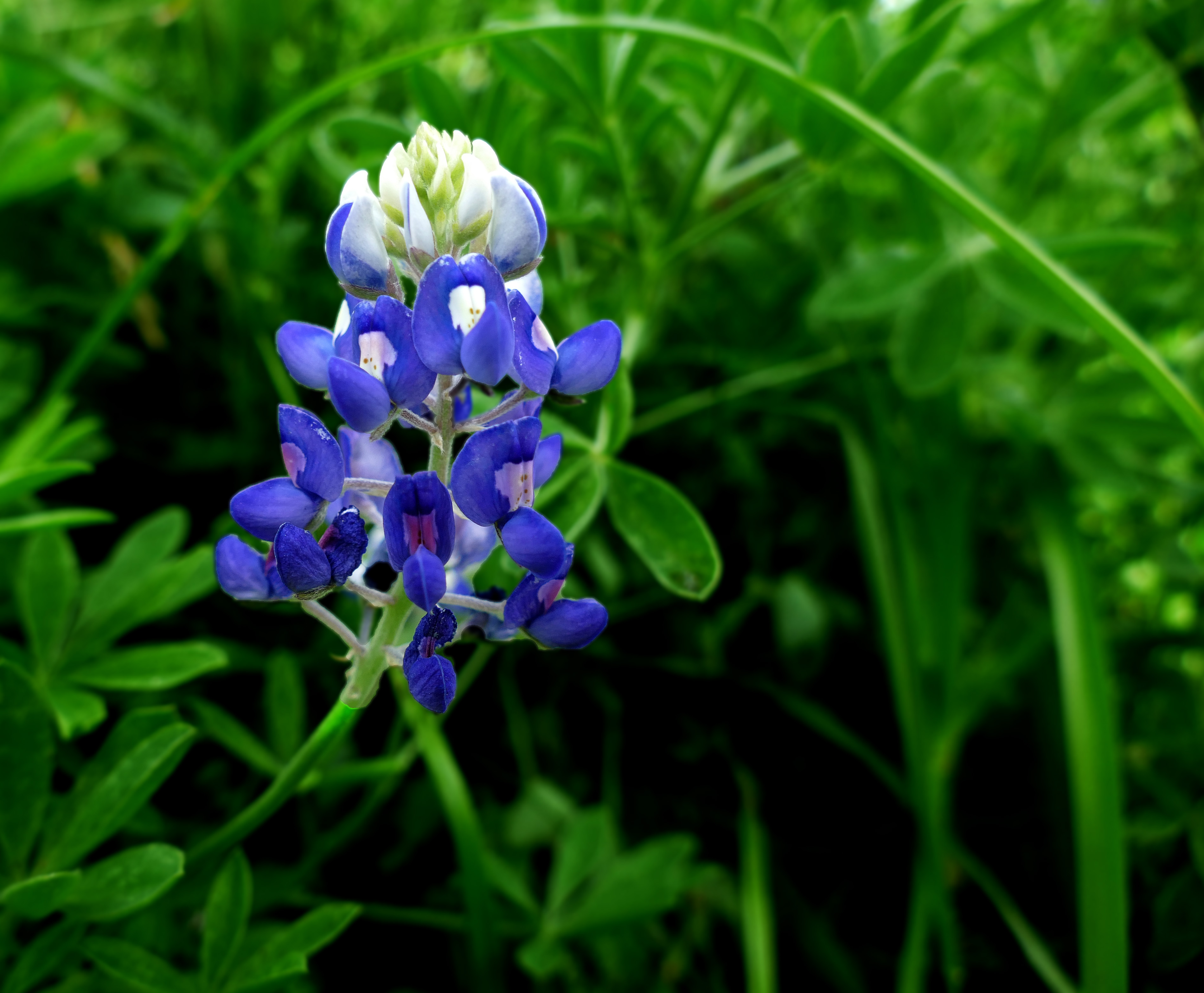
Texas bluebonnet -- Lupinus

The Bluebonnet Bowl was an annual college football bowl game played in Houston, Texas. A civic group was appointed by the Houston Chamber of Commerce Athletics Committee in 1959 to organize the bowl game. It was held at Rice Stadium from 1959 through 1967, and again in 1985 and 1986. The game was played in the Astrodome from 1968 through 1984, as well in 1987. When held in the Astrodome, it was called the Astro-Bluebonnet Bowl. The proceeds from the bowl games were distributed to various Harris County charitable organizations. The game was discontinued following the 1987 season due to poor ticket sales and lack of a title sponsor.

The Bluebonnet Bowl generally featured a team from Texas against an out-of-state opponent; 19 out of the 29 games involved a team from Texas. From 1980 to 1987, with the exception of 1981, a runner-up from the Southwest Conference played against an at-large opponent. The hometown Houston Cougars played in four games, all before joining the SWC. Runners-up from the Big 8 or Southeastern Conferences were also perennial participants.

The bluebonnet is the state flower of Texas.

Bowl games returned to Houston in 2000 with the Houston Bowl, and then the Texas Bowl since 2006.

== Game results ==
Season	Date	Winner		Loser		Venue	Attendance
1959	December 19	#11 Clemson	23	#7 TCU	7	Rice; Stadium	55,000
1960	December 17	#9 Alabama (tie)	3	#17 Texas	3	Rice; Stadium	68,000
1961	December 17	#15 Kansas	33	Rice	7	Rice; Stadium	52,000
1962	December 22	#11 Missouri	14	#12 Georgia Tech	10	Rice; Stadium	55,000
1963	December 21	#20 Baylor	14	LSU	7	Rice; Stadium	50,000
1964	December 19	#18 Tulsa	14	Ole Miss	7	Rice; Stadium	50,000
1965	December 18	#7 Tennessee	27	#16 Tulsa	6	Rice; Stadium	40,000
1966	December 17	Texas	19	Ole Miss	0	Rice; Stadium	67,000
1967	December 23	#13 Colorado	31	Miami	21	Rice; Stadium	30,156
1968	December 31	#16 SMU	28	#15 Oklahoma	27	Astrodome	53,543
1969	December 31	#16 Houston	36	#12 Auburn	7	Astrodome	55,203
1970	December 31	Alabama (tie)	24	#20 Oklahoma	24	Astrodome	53,829
1971	December 31	#7 Colorado	29	#14 Houston	17	Astrodome	54,720
1972	December 30	#11 Tennessee	24	#10 LSU	17	Astrodome	52,961
1973	December 29	#13 Houston	47	#15 Tulane	7	Astrodome	44,358
1974	December 23	Houston (tie)	31	#9 NC State	31	Astrodome	35,122
1975	December 27	#9 Texas	38	#10 Colorado	21	Astrodome	52,748
1976	December 31	#13 Nebraska	27	#8 Texas Tech	24	Astrodome	48,618
1977	December 31	#20 USC	47	#17 Texas A&M	28	Astrodome	52,842
1978	December 31	#20 Stanford	25	#7 Georgia	22	Astrodome	34,084
1979	December 31	#12 Purdue	27	Tennessee	22	Astrodome	40,542
1980	December 31	#11 North Carolina	16	Texas	7	Astrodome	36,667
1981	December 31	#13 Michigan	33	#16 UCLA	14	Astrodome	40,309
1982	December 31	#12 Arkansas	28	#19 Florida	24	Astrodome	31,557
1983	December 31	Oklahoma State	24	#17 Baylor	14	Astrodome	50,090
1984	December 31	West Virginia	31	TCU	14	Astrodome	43,260
1985	December 31	#7 Air Force	24	Texas	16	Rice; Stadium	42,000
1986	December 31	#14 Baylor	21	Colorado	9	Rice; Stadium	40,476
1987	December 31	Texas	32	#18 Pittsburgh	27	Astrodome	23,282

== Record by conference ==
Conference	Games	Wins	Losses	Ties
SWC	16	7	8	1
SEC	13	2	9	2
Big 8	10	6	3	1
Independent	8	3	4	1
ACC	3	2	0	1
Pac-10	3	2	1	0
Big Ten	2	2	0	0
MVC	2	1	1	0
WAC	1	1	0	0

== Teams with multiple appearances ==
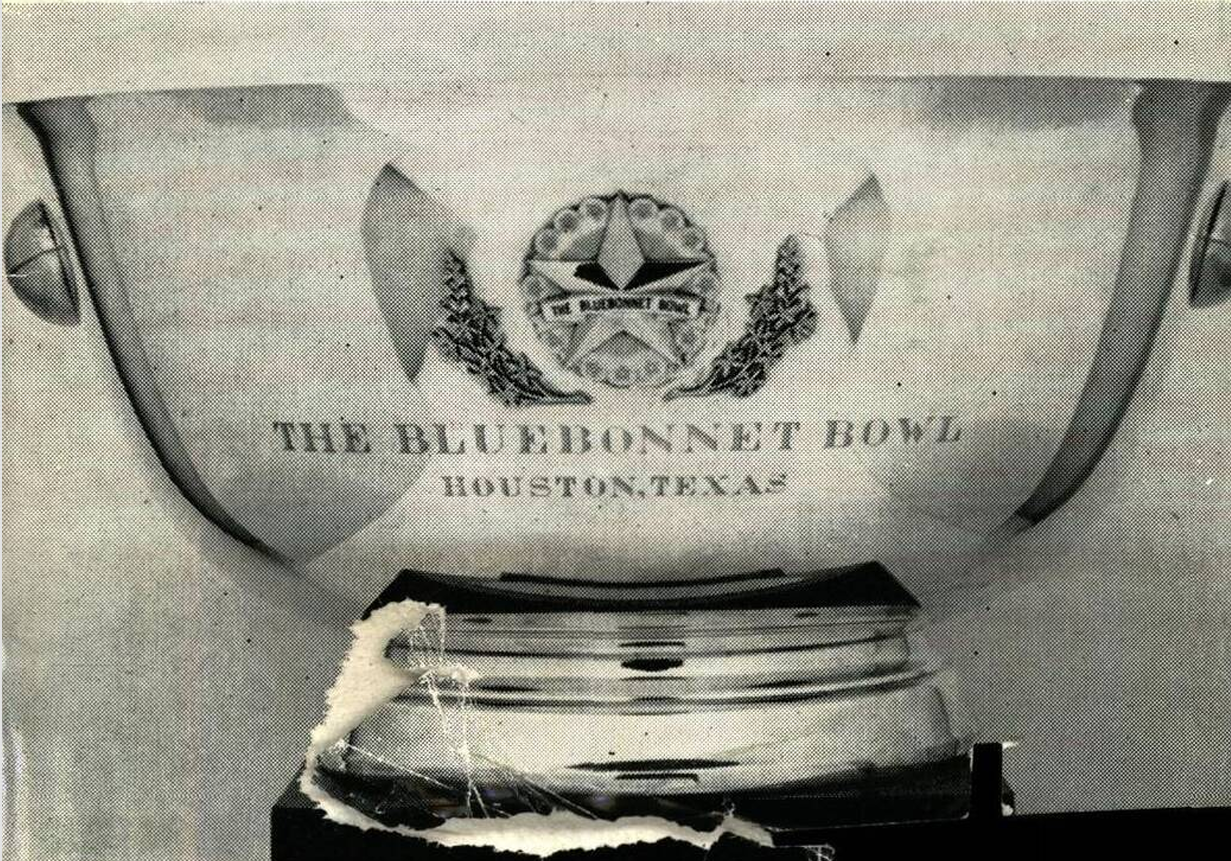
Trophy for the 1963 game

Team	Conference	Games	Wins	Losses	Ties
Texas	SWC	6	3	2	1
Houston	Independent	4	2	1	1
Colorado	Big 8	4	2	2	0
Baylor	SWC	3	2	1	0
Tennessee	SEC	3	2	1	0
Tulsa	Missouri Valley	2	1	1	0
Alabama	SEC	2	0	0	2
LSU	SEC	2	0	2	0
Ole Miss	SEC	2	0	2	0
TCU	SWC	2	0	2	0

== Media ==
The Bluebonnet Bowl was broadcast by:

- CBS (1959–1963)
- ABC (1964–1967)
- Syndication (1968–1972)
- ABC (1973–1975)
- TVS Television Network (1976)
- Mizlou Television Network (1977–1981)
- ESPN (1982)
- Mizlou (1983)
- ESPN (1984)
- USA Network/Lorimar Sports Network (1985)
- Raycom Sports (1986)
- Mizlou (1987)

== See also ==
- List of college bowl games
