= 1963 Arkansas Razorbacks football team =

American college football season

1963 Arkansas Razorbacks football
- Conference: Southwest Conference
- Record: 5–5 (3–4 SWC)
- Head coach: Frank Broyles (6th season)
- Captains: Jim Grizzle; Mike Parker
- Home stadium: Razorback Stadium; War Memorial Stadium

1963 Southwest Conference football standings
	Conf.					Overall
Team	W		L		T	W		L		T
No. 1 Texas $	7	–	0	–	0	11	–	0	–	0
Baylor	6	–	1	–	0	8	–	3	–	0
Rice	4	–	3	–	0	6	–	4	–	0
Arkansas	3	–	4	–	0	5	–	5	–	0
TCU	2	–	4	–	1	4	–	5	–	1
Texas Tech	2	–	5	–	0	5	–	5	–	0
SMU	2	–	5	–	0	4	–	7	–	0
Texas A&M	1	–	5	–	1	2	–	7	–	1
$ – Conference champion; Rankings from AP Poll

The 1963 Arkansas Razorbacks football team represented the University of Arkansas in the Southwest Conference (SWC) during the 1963 NCAA University Division football season. In their sixth year under head coach Frank Broyles, the Razorbacks compiled a 5–5 record (3–4 against SWC opponents), finished in fourth place in the SWC, and outscored all opponents by a combined total of 179 to 96.

Ken Hatfield led the nation in punt return yards, gaining 350 on 21 returns. Razorback Ronnie Caveness set a school record in the Texas game with 29 tackles. The NCAA record is 30, set in 2001.

The game against Texas Tech was one of only 6 games that weren't canceled or postponed following the assassination of President John F. Kennedy the day before.

== Schedule ==
Date	Opponent	Rank	Site	Result	Attendance	Source
September 21	Oklahoma State*	No. 8	War Memorial Stadium; Little Rock, AR	W 21–0	41,000	
September 28	Missouri*	No. 8	War Memorial Stadium; Little Rock, AR (rivalry)	L 6–7	41,000	
October 5	TCU		Razorback Stadium; Fayetteville, AR	W 18–3	31,000	
October 12	at Baylor		Baylor Stadium; Waco, TX	L 10–14	33,000	
October 19	No. 1 Texas		War Memorial Stadium; Little Rock, AR (rivalry)	L 13–17	42,000	
October 26	Tulsa*		Razorback Stadium; Fayetteville, AR	W 56–7	27,000	
November 2	Texas A&M		War Memorial Stadium; Little Rock, AR (rivalry)	W 21–7	41,000	
November 9	at Rice		Rice Stadium; Houston, TX	L 0–7	41,000	
November 16	at SMU		Cotton Bowl; Dallas, TX	L 7–14	24,000	
November 23	Texas Tech		Razorback Stadium; Fayetteville, AR (rivalry)	W 27–20	25,000	
*Non-conference game; Rankings from AP Poll released prior to the game
