= 1963 Sun Bowl =

American college football game

- 30th Sun Bowl
| Oregon Ducks | SMU Mustangs |
| (7–3) | (4–6) |
| Independent | SWC |
| 21 | 14 |
| Head coach: Len Casanova | Head coach: Hayden Fry |
| | 1 | 2 | 3 | 4 | Total |
|---|---|---|---|---|---|
| Oregon | 7 | 14 | 0 | 0 | 21 |
| SMU | 0 | 0 | 0 | 14 | 14 |
- Date: December 31, 1963
- Season: 1963
- Stadium: Sun Bowl
- Location: El Paso, Texas
- MVP: Bob Berry
- Favorite: Oregon by 3½
- Referee: Jack Sprenger (AAWU; split crew: AAWU, SWC, WAC)
- Attendance: 26,500

United States TV coverage
- Network: NBC

The 1963 Sun Bowl was a college football bowl game between the SMU Mustangs and the Oregon Ducks in El Paso, Texas. It was the 30th edition of the Sun Bowl (29th played between college teams), played on Tuesday, December 31, with a kickoff at 2 pm MST.

== Background ==
SMU (4–6) was seventh in the Southwest Conference in 1963; they were invited on the basis of their October non-conference wins over fourth-ranked Navy (with Roger Staubach) and Air Force. The Ducks were 7–3, led by head coach Len Casanova to their third bowl game in five years. It was Oregon's fifth and final year as an independent, following the disbandment of the Pacific Coast Conference. They joined the AAWU (Pac-8 Conference) in 1964, which had bowl restrictions (Rose Bowl only) until 1975; their next bowl appearance was in 1989.

This was the Sun Bowl's first game at the new stadium, which opened in September; previous games were played at Kidd Field, adjacent to the east.

== Game summary ==
The Ducks headed into the game without injured All-American halfback and defensive back Mel Renfro. They needed H.D. Murphy, who played those same positions, to step up against SMU and he did not disappoint. The junior college transfer made two clutch interceptions, coupled with Dennis Keller's touchdown run in the first quarter and quarterback Bob Berry throwing two touchdown passes in the second quarter to give Oregon a 21–0 lead at halftime. One of those interceptions came at Oregon’s own three-yard line to thwart a potential scoring drive for the Mustangs, and the other Murphy returned 49 yards to set up the Ducks’ first touchdown. Murphy’s outstanding defensive play greatly contributed to the first half margin.

It was up to Danny Thomas and Mac White to try to bring SMU back, and they narrowed the lead to 21–14 as each threw a touchdown pass to John Roderick in the fourth quarter. SMU's onside kick with less than a minute remaining went out of bounds, giving the Ducks the ball and ultimately the win. Redshirt junior Berry was 11 of 26 for 146 yards with two touchdowns (and one interception) and was named the game's MVP. Conversely, SMU's Thomas was 15-of-26 for 188 yards for one touchdown and two interceptions. Oregon's defense (with Murphy's interceptions) held off SMU in the second half to win 21–14. Murphy also added 49 yards rushing on only three carriers on the offensive side of the ball.

Oregon won their first bowl game in 47 years (Rose Bowl in January 1917); it was their last bowl for over a quarter century, until a win in the 1989 Independence Bowl.

== Statistics ==
| Statistics | SMU | Oregon |
|---|---|---|
| First downs | 20 | 16 |
| Yards rushing | 145 | 173 |
| Yards passing | 232 | 146 |
| Total yards | 377 | 319 |
| Punts-Average | 4–39.2 | 7–36.0 |
| Fumbles-Lost | 4–3 | 1–1 |
| Interceptions | 1 | 4 |
| Penalties-Yards | 5–38 | 7–79 |
