= 1963 Texas A&M Aggies football team =

American college football season

1963 Texas A&M Aggies football
- Conference: Southwest Conference
- Record: 2–7–1 (1–5–1 SWC)
- Head coach: Hank Foldberg (2nd season)
- Home stadium: Kyle Field

1963 Southwest Conference football standings
	Conf.					Overall
Team	W		L		T	W		L		T
No. 1 Texas $	7	–	0	–	0	11	–	0	–	0
Baylor	6	–	1	–	0	8	–	3	–	0
Rice	4	–	3	–	0	6	–	4	–	0
Arkansas	3	–	4	–	0	5	–	5	–	0
TCU	2	–	4	–	1	4	–	5	–	1
Texas Tech	2	–	5	–	0	5	–	5	–	0
SMU	2	–	5	–	0	4	–	7	–	0
Texas A&M	1	–	5	–	1	2	–	7	–	1
$ – Conference champion; Rankings from AP Poll

The 1963 Texas A&M Aggies football team represented Texas A&M University in the 1963 NCAA University Division football season as a member of the Southwest Conference (SWC). The Aggies were led by head coach Hank Foldberg in his second season and finished with a record of two wins, seven losses and one tie (2–7–1 overall, 1–5–1 in the SWC).

== Schedule ==
Date	Opponent	Site	Result	Attendance	Source
September 21	at LSU*	Tiger Stadium; Baton Rouge, LA (rivalry)	L 6–14	68,000	
September 28	at Ohio State*	Ohio Stadium; Columbus, OH	L 0–17	81,241	
October 5	at Texas Tech	Jones Stadium; Lubbock, TX (rivalry)	L 0–10	38,000	
October 12	Houston*	Kyle Field; College Station, TX	W 23–13	18,500	
October 19	at TCU	Amon G. Carter Stadium; Fort Worth, TX	T 14–14	37,372	
October 26	Baylor	Kyle Field; College Station, TX (rivalry)	L 7–34	21,000	
November 2	at Arkansas	War Memorial Stadium; Little Rock, AR (rivalry)	L 7–21	41,000	
November 9	SMU	Kyle Field; College Station, TX	L 7–9	15,000	
November 16	at Rice	Rice Stadium; Houston, TX	W 13–6	46,000	
November 28	No. 1 Texas	Kyle Field; College Station, TX (rivalry)	L 13–15	41,820	
*Non-conference game; Rankings from AP Poll released prior to the game
