= Staley Faulkner =

American football player (born 1941)

No. 71
- Position: Tackle

Personal information
- Born: April 2, 1941 (age 85); Pampa, Texas, U.S.
- Listed height: 6 ft 3 in (1.91 m)
- Listed weight: 245 lb (111 kg)

Career information
- High school: Denton (Denton, Texas)
- College: Texas (1959–1963)
- NFL draft: 1963: 14th round, 191st overall pick
- AFL draft: 1963: 21st round, 166th overall pick

Career history
- Houston Oilers (1964–1965)

Awards and highlights
- National champion (1963); Second-team All-Southwest Conference (1963)

Career AFL statistics
- Games played: 1
- Games started: 1
- Stats at Pro Football Reference

Staley L. Faulkner (born April 2, 1941) is an American former professional football tackle who played for the Houston Oilers of the American Football League (AFL). He played college football for the Texas Longhorns.

== Early life ==
Faulkner was born on April 2, 1941, in Pampa, Texas. He attended Denton High School in Denton, Texas.

== College career ==
Faulkner played college football for the Texas Longhorns from 1959 to 1963 and was a three-year letterman from 1961 to 1963. In 1959, he played on the freshman team. The following season, Faulkner played on the varsity team. He earned second-team All-Southwest Conference honors in 1963 along with a national championship after Texas defeated Navy in the 1964 Cotton Bowl.

== Professional career ==
Faulkner was selected in the 21st round, with the 166th overall selection, by the Houston Oilers in the 1963 AFL draft and in the 14th round, with the 191st overall selection, by the Cleveland Browns in the 1963 NFL draft. On January 8, 1964, he signed with the Oilers. Faulkner started in one game at right tackle against the San Diego Chargers before he was released on September 15. He was later signed to the taxi squad, where he remained for the 1964 season. On July 23, 1965, Faulkner was waived by the Oilers.
