= Phil Harris (American football) =

American football player (born 1944)

No. 46
- Positions: Safety, return specialist

Personal information
- Born: September 13, 1944 (age 82); Jackson, Wyoming, U.S.
- Listed height: 6 ft 0 in (1.83 m)
- Listed weight: 195 lb (88 kg)

Career information
- High school: Thomas Jefferson (San Antonio, Texas)
- College: Texas (1962–1965)
- NFL draft: 1966: 7th round, 104th overall pick

Career history
- New York Giants (1966–1967)

Awards and highlights
- National champion (1963); Southwest Conference All-Freshman team (1962)

Career NFL statistics
- Games played: 14
- Games started: 1
- Return yards: 487
- Stats at Pro Football Reference

Phillip Leon Harris (born September 13, 1944) is an American former professional football safety and return specialist who played for the New York Giants of the National Football League (NFL). He played college football for the Texas Longhorns.

== Early life ==
Harris was born on September 13, 1944, in Jackson Hole, Wyoming. He attended Thomas Jefferson High School in San Antonio, Texas. Harris was a three-sport letterman, competing in basketball, football and track and field. In football, he played at running back and defensive back and was an all-state and Parade All-American selection. On February 6, 1962, Harris signed to play college football at the University of Texas. In 2017, he was inducted into the San Antonio Independent School District Athletic Hall of Fame.

== College career ==
Harris played college football for the Texas Longhorns from 1962 to 1965 and was a three-year letterman from 1963 to 1965. In his first season at Texas, he played on the freshman team, where he rushed for 292 yards and had two touchdowns, leading the team. Harris was named to the Southwest Conference All-freshman team.

In 1963, he rushed for 91 yards and six touchdowns with five receptions for 45 yards on the varsity team. In the 1964 Cotton Bowl Classic, Harris caught three passes for 157 yards and two touchdowns, winning the National championship. His two scores came 58 and 63-yards out with latter on a tipped pass. Harris' receiving average of 52.3 yards set an NCAA bowl record.

In the next two seasons, Harris rushed for 482 yards and three touchdowns with 31 catches for 313 receiving yards. He then played in the 1966 Senior Bowl. On April 15, 2010, Harris was inducted into the Cotton Bowl Hall of Fame.

== Professional career ==
Harris was selected in the seventh round, with the 104th overall selection, by the New York Giants in the 1966 NFL draft. He played in 14 games, starting in one, at strong safety logging 487 return yards. Harris was released prior to the start of the 1967 season.

== Personal life ==
After retiring from professional football, Harris earned a J.D. degree from St. Mary's University and practiced law for 39 years in San Antonio.
