= 1963 SMU Mustangs football team =

American college football season

1963 SMU Mustangs football

Sun Bowl, L 14–21 vs. Oregon
- Conference: Southwest Conference
- Record: 4–7 (2–5 SWC)
- Head coach: Hayden Fry (2nd season)
- Captains: Ronnie Cosper; Martin Cude; Billy Gannon
- Home stadium: Cotton Bowl

1963 Southwest Conference football standings
	Conf.					Overall
Team	W		L		T	W		L		T
No. 1 Texas $	7	–	0	–	0	11	–	0	–	0
Baylor	6	–	1	–	0	8	–	3	–	0
Rice	4	–	3	–	0	6	–	4	–	0
Arkansas	3	–	4	–	0	5	–	5	–	0
TCU	2	–	4	–	1	4	–	5	–	1
Texas Tech	2	–	5	–	0	5	–	5	–	0
SMU	2	–	5	–	0	4	–	7	–	0
Texas A&M	1	–	5	–	1	2	–	7	–	1
$ – Conference champion; Rankings from AP Poll

The 1963 SMU Mustangs football team represented Southern Methodist University (SMU) as a member of the Southwest Conference (SWC) during the 1963 NCAA University Division football season. Led by second-year head coach Hayden Fry, the Mustangs compiled an overall record of 4–7 with a conference mark of 2–5, tying for sixth place in the SWC. SMU was invited to the Sun Bowl, where they lost to Oregon.

== Schedule ==
Date	Opponent	Site	Result	Attendance	Source
September 28	at Michigan*	Michigan Stadium; Ann Arbor, MI	L 16–27	36,659	
October 5	Air Force*	Cotton Bowl; Dallas, TX	W 10–0	30,000	
October 11	No. 4 Navy*	Cotton Bowl; Dallas, TX	W 32–28	37,000	
October 19	at Rice	Rice Stadium; Houston, TX (rivalry)	L 7–13	52,000	
October 26	Texas Tech	Cotton Bowl; Dallas, TX	L 6–13	19,000	
November 2	No. 1 Texas	Cotton Bowl; Dallas, TX	L 12–17	59,000	
November 9	at Texas A&M	Kyle Field; College Station, TX	W 9–7	15,000	
November 16	Arkansas	Cotton Bowl; Dallas, TX	W 14–7	24,000	
November 30	at TCU	Amon G. Carter Stadium; Fort Worth, TX (rivalry)	L 15–22	19,672	
December 7	at Baylor	Baylor Stadium; Waco, TX	L 6–20	26,000	
December 31	vs. Oregon*	Sun Bowl; El Paso, TX (Sun Bowl)	L 14–21	26,500	
*Non-conference game; Rankings from AP Poll released prior to the game
