= 1963 TCU Horned Frogs football team =

American college football season

1963 TCU Horned Frogs football
- Conference: Southwest Conference
- Record: 4–5–1 (2–4–1 SWC)
- Head coach: Abe Martin (11th season)
- Offensive scheme: Meyer spread
- Home stadium: Amon G. Carter Stadium

1963 Southwest Conference football standings
| | Conf. | | | | | Overall |
| Team | W | | L | | T | W | | L | | T |
|---|---|---|---|---|---|---|---|---|---|---|
| No. 1 Texas $ | 7 | – | 0 | – | 0 | 11 | – | 0 | – | 0 |
| Baylor | 6 | – | 1 | – | 0 | 8 | – | 3 | – | 0 |
| Rice | 4 | – | 3 | – | 0 | 6 | – | 4 | – | 0 |
| Arkansas | 3 | – | 4 | – | 0 | 5 | – | 5 | – | 0 |
| TCU | 2 | – | 4 | – | 1 | 4 | – | 5 | – | 1 |
| Texas Tech | 2 | – | 5 | – | 0 | 5 | – | 5 | – | 0 |
| SMU | 2 | – | 5 | – | 0 | 4 | – | 7 | – | 0 |
| Texas A&M | 1 | – | 5 | – | 1 | 2 | – | 7 | – | 1 |
$ – Conference champion; Rankings from AP Poll

The 1963 TCU Horned Frogs football team represented Texas Christian University (TCU) in the 1963 NCAA University Division football season. The Horned Frogs finished the season 4–5–1 overall and 2–4–1 in the Southwest Conference. The team was coached by Abe Martin in his 11th year as head coach. The Frogs played their home games in Amon G. Carter Stadium, which is located on campus in Fort Worth, Texas.

== Schedule ==
| Date | Opponent | Site | Result | Attendance | Source |
|---|---|---|---|---|---|
| September 21 | Kansas* | Amon G. Carter Stadium; Fort Worth, TX | W 10–6 | 26,000 | |
| September 28 | at Florida State* | Doak Campbell Stadium; Tallahassee, FL | W 13–0 | 16,000 | |
| October 5 | at Arkansas | Razorback Stadium; Fayetteville, AR | L 3–18 | 31,000 | |
| October 12 | at Texas Tech | Jones Stadium; Lubbock, TX (rivalry) | W 35–3 | 31,500 | |
| October 19 | Texas A&M | Amon G. Carter Stadium; Fort Worth, TX (rivalry) | T 14–14 | 37,372 | |
| November 2 | at Baylor | Baylor Stadium; Waco, TX (rivalry) | L 13–32 | 36,000 | |
| November 9 | at LSU* | Tiger Stadium; Baton Rouge, LA | L 14–28 | 67,000 | |
| November 16 | at No. 1 Texas | Memorial Stadium; Austin, TX (rivalry) | L 0–17 | 58,000 | |
| November 30 | SMU | Amon G. Carter Stadium; Fort Worth, TX (rivalry) | W 22–15 | 19,672 | |
| December 7 | Rice | Amon G. Carter Stadium; Fort Worth, TX | L 7–33 | 13,000 | |
*Non-conference game; Rankings from AP Poll released prior to the game
