= 1963 Colorado Buffaloes football team =

American college football season

1963 Colorado Buffaloes football
- Conference: Big Eight Conference
- Record: 2–8 (2–5 Big 8)
- Head coach: Eddie Crowder (1st season)
- MVP: Noble Milton
- Captain: Tom Kresnak
- Home stadium: Folsom Field

1963 Big Eight Conference football standings
	Conf.					Overall
Team	W		L		T	W		L		T
No. 6 Nebraska $	7	–	0	–	0	10	–	1	–	0
No. 9 Oklahoma	6	–	1	–	0	8	–	2	–	0
Missouri	5	–	2	–	0	7	–	3	–	0
Kansas	3	–	4	–	0	5	–	5	–	0
Iowa State	3	–	4	–	0	4	–	5	–	0
Colorado	2	–	5	–	0	2	–	8	–	0
Kansas State	1	–	5	–	0	2	–	7	–	0
Oklahoma State	0	–	6	–	0	1	–	8	–	0
$ – Conference champion; Rankings from AP Poll

The 1963 Colorado Buffaloes football team was an American football team that represented the University of Colorado in the Big Eight Conference during the 1963 NCAA University Division football season. Led by first-year head coach Eddie Crowder, the Buffaloes compiled an overall record of 2–8 with a mark of 2–5 in conference play, placing sixth in the Big 8. Colorado played home games on campus at Folsom Field in Boulder, Colorado.

Crowder, previously an assistant coach at Oklahoma and a former Sooner quarterback, was hired at age 31 in early January, with a five-year contract at $15,000 per year.

== Schedule ==
Date	Opponent	Site	Result	Attendance	Source
September 21	No. 1 USC*	Folsom Field; Boulder, CO	L 0–14	27,000	
September 28	at Oregon State*	Multnomah Stadium; Portland, OR	L 6–41	18,721	
October 5	at Kansas State	Memorial Stadium; Manhattan, KS (rivalry)	W 21–7	17,500	
October 12	Oklahoma State	Folsom Field; Boulder, CO	W 25–0	35,600	
October 19	Iowa State^{†}	Folsom Field; Boulder, CO	L 7–19	27,500	
October 26	at Nebraska	Memorial Stadium; Lincoln, NE (rivalry)	L 6–41	37,000	
November 2	at No. 6 Oklahoma	Oklahoma Memorial Stadium; Norman, OK	L 0–35	50,000	
November 9	Missouri	Folsom Field; Boulder, CO	L 7–28	23,000	
November 16	Kansas	Folsom Field; Boulder, CO	L 14–43	21,000	
December 7	at Air Force*	Falcon Stadium; Colorado Springs, CO	L 14–17	26,016	
*Non-conference game; ^{†}Homecoming; Rankings from AP Poll released prior to the game; Source:
