= 1963 Texas Tech Red Raiders football team =

American college football season

1963 Texas Tech Red Raiders football
- Conference: Southwest Conference
- Record: 5–5 (2–5 SWC)
- Head coach: J. T. King (3rd season)
- Offensive scheme: T formation
- Base defense: 4–3
- Home stadium: Jones Stadium

1963 Southwest Conference football standings
	Conf.					Overall
Team	W		L		T	W		L		T
No. 1 Texas $	7	–	0	–	0	11	–	0	–	0
Baylor	6	–	1	–	0	8	–	3	–	0
Rice	4	–	3	–	0	6	–	4	–	0
Arkansas	3	–	4	–	0	5	–	5	–	0
TCU	2	–	4	–	1	4	–	5	–	1
Texas Tech	2	–	5	–	0	5	–	5	–	0
SMU	2	–	5	–	0	4	–	7	–	0
Texas A&M	1	–	5	–	1	2	–	7	–	1
$ – Conference champion; Rankings from AP Poll

The 1963 Texas Tech Red Raiders football team represented Texas Technological College—now known as Texas Tech University—as a member of the Southwest Conference (SWC) during the 1963 NCAA University Division football season. In their third season under head coach J. T. King, the Red Raiders compiled a 5–5 record (2–5 against conference opponents), tied for sixth place in the SWC, and were outscored by opponents by a combined total of 178 to 147. The team's statistical leaders included James Ellis with 536 passing yards, Donny Anderson with 609 rushing yards, and David Parks with 499 receiving yards. The team played its home games at Clifford B. and Audrey Jones Stadium.

== Schedule ==
Date	Opponent	Site	Result	Attendance	Source
September 21	Washington State*	Jones Stadium; Lubbock, TX	W 16–7	31,500	
September 28	at No. 4 Texas	Memorial Stadium; Austin, TX (rivalry)	L 7–49	54,000	
October 5	Texas A&M	Jones Stadium; Lubbock, TX (rivalry)	W 10–0	38,000	
October 12	TCU	Jones Stadium; Lubbock, TX (rivalry)	L 3–35	31,500	
October 19	Baylor	Jones Stadium; Lubbock, TX (rivalry)	L 17–21	32,000	
October 26	at SMU	Cotton Bowl; Dallas, TX	W 13–6	19,000	
November 2	Rice^{†}	Jones Stadium; Lubbock, TX	L 3–17	36,500	
November 9	Kansas State*	Jones Stadium; Lubbock, TX	W 51–13	24,500	
November 16	at Texas Western*	Sun Bowl; El Paso, TX	W 7–3	18,400	
November 23	at Arkansas	Razorback Stadium; Fayetteville, AR (rivalry)	L 20–27	25,000	
*Non-conference game; ^{†}Homecoming; Rankings from AP Poll released prior to the game
