= 1963 Oklahoma Sooners football team =

American college football season

1963 Oklahoma Sooners football
- Conference: Big Eight Conference

Ranking
- Coaches: No. 8
- AP: No. 9
- Record: 8–2 (6–1 Big 8)
- Head coach: Bud Wilkinson (17th season)
- Captains: John Garrett; Larry Vermillion
- Home stadium: Oklahoma Memorial Stadium

1963 Big Eight Conference football standings
	Conf.					Overall
Team	W		L		T	W		L		T
No. 6 Nebraska $	7	–	0	–	0	10	–	1	–	0
No. 9 Oklahoma	6	–	1	–	0	8	–	2	–	0
Missouri	5	–	2	–	0	7	–	3	–	0
Kansas	3	–	4	–	0	5	–	5	–	0
Iowa State	3	–	4	–	0	4	–	5	–	0
Colorado	2	–	5	–	0	2	–	8	–	0
Kansas State	1	–	5	–	0	2	–	7	–	0
Oklahoma State	0	–	6	–	0	1	–	8	–	0
$ – Conference champion; Rankings from AP Poll

The 1963 Oklahoma Sooners football team represented the University of Oklahoma during the 1963 NCAA University Division football season. They played their home games at Oklahoma Memorial Stadium and competed as members of the Big Eight Conference. They were coached by head coach Bud Wilkinson, who would retire from coaching after the conclusion of the season.

== Schedule ==
Date	Opponent	Rank	Site	TV	Result	Attendance	Source
September 21	Clemson*	No. 4	Oklahoma Memorial Stadium; Norman, OK		W 31–14	62,034	
September 28	at No. 1 USC*	No. 3	Los Angeles Memorial Coliseum; Los Angeles, CA	CBS	W 17–12	39,345	
October 12	vs. No. 2 Texas*	No. 1	Cotton Bowl; Dallas, TX (Red River Shootout)	CBS	L 7–28	75,504	
October 19	Kansas	No. 6	Oklahoma Memorial Stadium; Norman, OK		W 21–18	61,826	
October 26	at Kansas State	No. 7	Memorial Stadium; Manhattan, KS		W 34–9	14,000	
November 2	Colorado	No. 6	Oklahoma Memorial Stadium; Norman, OK		W 35–0	50,000	
November 9	Iowa State	No. 6	Oklahoma Memorial Stadium; Norman, OK		W 24–14	50,000	
November 16	at Missouri	No. 5	Memorial Stadium; Columbia, MO (rivalry)	CBS	W 13–3	50,800	
November 23	at No. 10 Nebraska	No. 6	Memorial Stadium; Lincoln, NE (rivalry)		L 20–29	38,485	
November 30	Oklahoma State	No. 10	Oklahoma Memorial Stadium; Norman, OK (Bedlam Series)		W 34–10	50,000	
*Non-conference game; Rankings from AP Poll released prior to the game; Source:

== Rankings ==
Ranking movements Legend: ██ Increase in ranking ██ Decrease in ranking ( ) = First-place votes
	Week												
Poll	Pre	1	2	3	4	5	6	7	8	9	10	11	Final
AP	4	3 (2)	1 (36)	1 (40)	6	7	6	6	5	6	10	8	10

== NFL draft ==
The following players were drafted into the National Football League following the season.

Round	Pick	Player	Position	NFL team
1	12	Joe Don Looney	Running back	New York Giants
11	152	Glen Condren	Tackle	New York Giants
14	189	John Garrett	Linebacker	Los Angeles Rams
