= 1963 Kansas State Wildcats football team =

American college football season

1963 Kansas State Wildcats football
- Conference: Big Eight Conference
- Record: 2–7 (1–5 Big 8)
- Head coach: Doug Weaver (4th season)
- Home stadium: Memorial Stadium

1963 Big Eight Conference football standings
	Conf.					Overall
Team	W		L		T	W		L		T
No. 6 Nebraska $	7	–	0	–	0	10	–	1	–	0
No. 9 Oklahoma	6	–	1	–	0	8	–	2	–	0
Missouri	5	–	2	–	0	7	–	3	–	0
Kansas	3	–	4	–	0	5	–	5	–	0
Iowa State	3	–	4	–	0	4	–	5	–	0
Colorado	2	–	5	–	0	2	–	8	–	0
Kansas State	1	–	5	–	0	2	–	7	–	0
Oklahoma State	0	–	6	–	0	1	–	8	–	0
$ – Conference champion; Rankings from AP Poll

The 1963 Kansas State Wildcats football team represented Kansas State University in the 1963 NCAA University Division football season. The team's head football coach was Doug Weaver. The Wildcats played their home games in Memorial Stadium. 1963 saw the Wildcats finish with a record of 2–7 and a 1–5 record in Big Eight Conference play. The Wildcats scored only 91 points while giving up 222. They finished seventh in the Big Eight.

Kansas State and Oklahoma State were scheduled to play on November 23, but that game was cancelled due to the assassination of John F. Kennedy on November 22.

== Schedule ==
Date	Opponent	Site	Result	Attendance	Source
September 21	BYU*	Memorial Stadium; Manhattan, KS	W 24-7	11,000	
September 28	at San Jose State*	Spartan Stadium; San Jose, CA	L 0–16	17,195	
October 5	Colorado	Memorial Stadium; Manhattan, KS (rivalry)	L 7–21	17,500	
October 12	at Missouri	Memorial Stadium; Columbia, MO	L 11–21	36,000	
October 19	Nebraska	Memorial Stadium; Manhattan, KS (rivalry)	L 6–28	16,500	
October 26	No. 7 Oklahoma^{†}	Memorial Stadium; Manhattan, KS	L 9–34	14,000	
November 2	at Kansas	Memorial Stadium; Lawrence, KS (rivalry)	L 0–34	30,000	
November 9	at Texas Tech*	Jones Stadium; Lubbock, TX	L 13–51	24,500	
November 16	at Iowa State	Clyde Williams Field; Ames, IA (rivalry)	W 21–10	14,000	
November 23	at Oklahoma State	Lewis Field; Stillwater, OK	Canceled		
*Non-conference game; ^{†}Homecoming; Rankings from AP Poll released prior to the game; Source:
