= 1963 Texas Longhorns football team =

American college football season

1963 Texas Longhorns football

Consensus national champion SWC champion Cotton Bowl Classic champion

Cotton Bowl Classic, W 28–6 vs. Navy
- Conference: Southwest Conference

Ranking
- Coaches: No. 1
- AP: No. 1
- Record: 11–0 (7–0 SWC)
- Head coach: Darrell Royal (7th season)
- Offensive scheme: Wing T
- Base defense: 6-2
- Home stadium: Memorial Stadium

1963 Southwest Conference football standings
	Conf.					Overall
Team	W		L		T	W		L		T
No. 1 Texas $	7	–	0	–	0	11	–	0	–	0
Baylor	6	–	1	–	0	8	–	3	–	0
Rice	4	–	3	–	0	6	–	4	–	0
Arkansas	3	–	4	–	0	5	–	5	–	0
TCU	2	–	4	–	1	4	–	5	–	1
Texas Tech	2	–	5	–	0	5	–	5	–	0
SMU	2	–	5	–	0	4	–	7	–	0
Texas A&M	1	–	5	–	1	2	–	7	–	1
$ – Conference champion; Rankings from AP Poll

The 1963 Texas Longhorns football team was an American football team that represented the University of Texas (now known as the University of Texas at Austin) as a member of the Southwest Conference (SWC) during the 1963 NCAA University Division football season. In their seventh year under head coach Darrell Royal, the Longhorns compiled an overall record of 11–0, with a mark of 7–0 in conference play, and finished as SWC champion. Texas concluded their season with a victory over Navy in the Cotton Bowl Classic.

The Longhorns won their first national championship. Tommy Nobis was the only sophomore starter, and was an important participant on the Longhorns' 1963 team, which defeated #2 Navy led by Heisman Trophy winner Roger Staubach in the 1964 Cotton Bowl Classic, 28–6.

== Schedule ==
After defeating Baylor in their eighth game, the Longhorns became the only major team with no losses and no ties in college football. After defeating their first nine opponents, the Longhorns clinched the Southwestern Conference title and a spot in the Cotton Bowl. The Longhorns ended up finishing the regular season with a 10–0 record and defeated #2 Navy in the 1964 Cotton Bowl Classic, 28–6. Texas was the consensus national champion before the game with #2 Navy, regardless of the outcome because the AP Poll and UPI Poll did not release polls after bowl games until years later. However, the win ensured that there would be no dispute as had happened in other years when #1 teams lost their bowl games.

Date	Time	Opponent	Rank	Site	TV	Result	Attendance	Source
September 20	8:00 p.m.	at Tulane*	No. 5	Tulane Stadium; New Orleans, LA		W 21–0	18,000	
September 28	7:30 p.m.	Texas Tech	No. 4	Memorial Stadium; Austin, TX (rivalry)		W 49–7	54,000	
October 5	7:30 p.m.	Oklahoma State*	No. 3	Memorial Stadium; Austin, TX		W 34–7	48,000	
October 12	2:00 p.m.	vs. No. 1 Oklahoma*	No. 2	Cotton Bowl; Dallas, TX (rivalry)	CBS	W 28–7	75,504	
October 19	7:30 p.m.	at Arkansas	No. 1	War Memorial Stadium; Little Rock, AR (rivalry)		W 17–13	42,000	
October 26	7:30 p.m.	Rice	No. 1	Memorial Stadium; Austin, TX (rivalry)		W 10–6	64,130	
November 2	2:00 p.m.	at SMU	No. 1	Cotton Bowl; Dallas, TX		W 17–12	59,000	
November 9	2:00 p.m.	Baylor	No. 1	Memorial Stadium; Austin, TX (rivalry)		W 7–0	64,530	
November 16	2:00 p.m.	TCU	No. 1	Memorial Stadium; Austin, TX (rivalry)		W 17–0	58,000	
November 28	2:00 p.m.	at Texas A&M	No. 1	Kyle Field; College Station, TX (rivalry)	CBS	W 15–13	41,820	
January 1, 1964	1:00 p.m.	vs. No. 2 Navy*	No. 1	Cotton Bowl; Dallas, TX (Cotton Bowl Classic)	CBS	W 28–6	75,504	
*Non-conference game; Rankings from AP Poll released prior to the game; All times are in Central time

== Game summaries ==
=== At Tulane ===
Texas Longhorns (0–0) vs. Tulane Green Wave (0–0)

Quarter	1	2	3	4	Total
No. 5 Texas	0	3	3	15	21
Tulane	0	0	0	0	0

at Tulane Stadium • New Orleans, LA

- Date: Friday, September 20, 1963
- Game time: 8:00 PM CDT
- Game weather: Clear, 75 °F (24 °C)
- Game attendance: 18,000
- Box Score

Game information

Second Quarter

- (1:10) UT – Tony Crosby 27 yard field goal, UT 3–0; 9 plays, 29 yards

Third Quarter

- (7:00) UT – Tony Crosby 31 yard field goal, UT 6–0; 12 plays, 58 yards

Fourth Quarter

- (13:21) UT – Phil Harris 13 yard run, (Phil Harris pass from Duke Carlisle), UT 14–0; 7 plays, 52 yards
- (7:29) UT – Phil Harris 2 yard run, (Crosby kick), UT 21–0; 14 plays, 59 yards

Statistics	TEX	TU
First downs	22	8
Total yards	368	138
Rushes/yards	60/282	32/103
Passing yards	86	35
Passing: Comp–Att–Int	8–18–0	4–14–2
Time of possession		

Team	Category	Player	Statistics
Texas	Passing	Duke Carlisle	3–8, 45 yards
Texas	Rushing	Ernie Koy	13 car, 61 yards
Texas	Receiving	Charles Talbert	3 rec, 39 yards
Tulane	Passing	TEAM	4–14, 35 yards, 2 INTs
Tulane	Rushing	TEAM	32 car, 103 yards
Tulane	Receiving	TEAM	4 rec, 35 yards

=== Vs. Texas Tech ===
Texas Tech Red Raiders (1–0) vs. Texas Longhorns (1–0)

Quarter	1	2	3	4	Total
Texas Tech	0	0	7	0	7
No. 4 Texas	7	21	14	7	49

at Memorial Stadium • Austin, TX

- Date: Saturday, September 28, 1963
- Game time: 7:30 PM CDT
- Game weather: Fair, 85 °F (29 °C)
- Game attendance: 54,000
- Box Score

Game information

First Quarter

- (12:34) UT – Tommy Ford 18 yard run, (Crosby kick), UT 7–0; 1 play, 18 yards, 0:07

Second Quarter

- (12:47) UT – Ernie Koy 1 yard run, (Crosby kick), UT 14–0; 10 plays, 55 yards, 3:56
- (10:57) UT – Charles Talbert 25 yard pass from Duke Carlisle, (Crosby kick), UT 21–0; 3 plays, 44 yards, 0:31
- (2:52) UT – Ernie Koy 1 yard run, (Crosby kick), UT 28–0; 15 plays, 52 yards, 5:44

Third Quarter

- (14:10) UT – Tommy Ford 1 yard run, (Crosby kick), UT 35–0; 3 plays, 12 yards, 0:40
- (9:37) UT – Tom Stockton 12 yard run, (Crosby kick), UT 42–0; 5 plays, 75 yards, 1:44
- (3:50) TTU – Lowery 1 yard run, (Daniels kick), UT 42–7; 6 plays, 29 yards, 2:48

Fourth Quarter

- (9:29) UT – Tommy Wade 4 yard run, (Crosby kick), UT 49–7; 12 plays, 44 yards, 4:15

Statistics	TTU	TEX
First downs	7	23
Total yards	142	390
Rushes/yards	32/59	61/269
Passing yards	83	121
Passing: Comp–Att–Int	8–17–3	7–16–1
Time of possession		

Team	Category	Player	Statistics
Texas Tech	Passing	TEAM	8–17, 83 yards, 3 INTs
Texas Tech	Rushing	TEAM	32 car, 59 yards, 1 TD
Texas Tech	Receiving	TEAM	8 rec, 83 yards
Texas	Passing	Duke Carlisle	3–5, 65 yards, 1 TD
Texas	Rushing	Marv Kristynik	7 car, 51 yards
Texas	Receiving	Knox Nunnally	2 rec, 45 yards

=== Vs. Oklahoma State ===
Oklahoma State Cowboys (0–1) vs. Texas Longhorns (2–0)

Quarter	1	2	3	4	Total
Oklahoma State	7	0	0	0	7
No. 3 Texas	10	10	14	0	34

at Memorial Stadium • Austin, TX

- Date: Saturday, October 5, 1963
- Game time: 7:30 PM CDT
- Game weather: Fair, 81 °F (27 °C)
- Game attendance: 48,000
- Box Score

Game information

First Quarter

- (13:18) UT – Tony Crosby 32 yard field goal, UT 3–0; 4 plays, -3
- (6:41) OSU – Garrison 48 yard run, (Durkee kick), OSU 7–3; 5 plays, 70 yards, 2:05
- (1:33) UT – Tommy Ford 4 yard run, (Crosby kick), UT 10–7; 7 plays, 24 yards, 2:25

Second Quarter

- (4:20) UT – Phil Harris 6 yard run, (Crosby kick), UT 17–7; 6 plays, 57 yards, 1:45
- (1:13) UT – Tony Crosby 33 yard field goal, UT 20–7; 6 plays, 20 yards

Third Quarter

- (7:50) UT – Duke Carlisle 11 yard run, (Crosby kick), UT 27–7; 5 plays, 49 yards, 2:01
- (2:42) UT – Hix Green 3 yard run, (Crosby kick), UT 34–7; 9 plays, 70 yards, 3:30

Statistics	OSU	TEX
First downs	8	21
Total yards	198	353
Rushes/yards	34/153	69/266
Passing yards	45	87
Passing: Comp–Att–Int	4–17–2	7–13–1
Time of possession		

Team	Category	Player	Statistics
Oklahoma State	Passing	TEAM	4–17, 45 yards, 2 INTs
Oklahoma State	Rushing	TEAM	34 car, 153 yards, 1 TD
Oklahoma State	Receiving	TEAM	4 rec, 45 yards
Texas	Passing	Duke Carlisle	2–7, 31 yards, 1 INT
Texas	Rushing	Harold Philipp	13 car, 79 yards
Texas	Receiving	Dan Mauldin	2 rec, 28 yards

=== Vs. Oklahoma ===
Texas Longhorns (3–0) vs. Oklahoma Sooners (2–0)

Quarter	1	2	3	4	Total
No. 2 Texas	7	7	7	7	28
No. 1 Oklahoma	0	0	7	0	7

at Cotton Bowl • Dallas, TX

- Date: Saturday, October 12, 1963
- Game time: 2:00 PM CDT
- Game weather: Fair, 90 °F (32 °C)
- Game attendance: 75,504
- TV: CBS
- Box Score

Game information

First Quarter

- (8:06) UT – Duke Carlisle 1 yard run, (Crosby kick), UT 7–0; 13 plays, 68 yards, 6:54

Second Quarter

- (5:51) UT – Tommy Ford 12 yard run, (Crosby kick), UT 14–0; 3 plays, 22 yards, 1:23

Third Quarter

- (10:00) UT – Phil Harris 3 yard run, (Crosby kick), UT 21–0; 6 plays, 18 yards, 3:32
- (2:24) OU – Hammond 3 yard run, (Jarman kick), UT 21–7; 8 plays, 62 yards, 3:19

Fourth Quarter

- (0:51) UT – George Sauer 14 yard pass from Marv Kristynik, (Crosby kick), UT 28–7; 13 plays, 63 yards, 4:49

Statistics	TEX	OU
First downs	16	8
Total yards	253	190
Rushes/yards	65/239	36/127
Passing yards	14	63
Passing: Comp–Att–Int	1–3–0	4–10–3
Time of possession		

Team	Category	Player	Statistics
Texas	Passing	Marv Kristynik	1–2, 14 yards, 1 TD
Texas	Rushing	Tommy Ford	21 car, 77 yards, 1 TD
Texas	Receiving	George Sauer	1 rec, 14 yards, 1 TD
Oklahoma	Passing	TEAM	4–10, 63 yards, 3 INTs
Oklahoma	Rushing	TEAM	36 car, 127 yards, 1 TD
Oklahoma	Receiving	TEAM	4 rec, 63 yards

=== At Arkansas ===
Texas Longhorns (4–0) vs. Arkansas Razorbacks (2–2)

Quarter	1	2	3	4	Total
No. 1 Texas	7	10	0	0	17
Arkansas	0	7	0	6	13

at War Memorial Stadium • Little Rock, AR

- Date: Saturday, October 19, 1963
- Game time: 7:30 PM CDT
- Game weather: Clear, 70 °F (21 °C)
- Game attendance: 41,000
- Box Score

Game information

First Quarter

- (7:27) UT – Tommy Ford 1 yard run, (Crosby kick), UT 7–0; 14 plays, 68 yards, 7:33

Second Quarter

- (13:19) UT – Tommy Ford 3 yard run, (Crosby kick), UT 14–0; 8 plays, 84 yards
- (0:53) UT – Tony Crosby 29 yard field goal, UT 17–0; 13 plays, 66 yards
- (0:26) ARK – Sparks 12 yard pass from Brittenum, (McKnelly kick), UT 17–7; 1 play, 12 yards

Fourth Quarter

- (9:20) ARK – Brittenum 1 yard run, (Brittenum pass failed), UT 17–13; 20 plays, 90 yards

Statistics	TEX	ARK
First downs	18	10
Total yards	301	162
Rushes/yards	58/247	32/71
Passing yards	54	91
Passing: Comp–Att–Int	5–7–0	9–19–1
Time of possession		

Team	Category	Player	Statistics
Texas	Passing	Duke Carlisle	5–7, 54 yards
Texas	Rushing	Harold Philipp	20 car, 135 yards
Texas	Receiving	Charles Talbert	1 rec, 17 yards
Arkansas	Passing	TEAM	9–19, 91 yards, 1 TD, 1 INT
Arkansas	Rushing	TEAM	32 car, 71 yards, 1 TD
Arkansas	Receiving	TEAM	9 rec, 91 yards, 1 TD

=== Vs. Rice ===
Rice Owls (3–1) vs. Texas Longhorns (5–0)

Quarter	1	2	3	4	Total
Rice	6	0	0	0	6
No. 1 Texas	7	3	0	0	10

at Memorial Stadium • Austin, TX

- Date: Saturday, October 26, 1963
- Game time: 7:30 PM CDT
- Game weather: Fair, 74 °F (23 °C)
- Game attendance: 64,130
- Box Score

Game information

First Quarter

- (9:03) UT – Tommy Ford 33 yard run, (Crosby kick), UT 7–0; 10 plays, 73 yards, 3:59
- (3:08) RICE – Kelly 9 yard pass from McReynolds, (kick blocked), UT 7–6; 13 plays, 71 yards, 5:34

Second Quarter

- (4:56) UT – Tony Crosby 22 yard field goal, UT 10–6; 12 plays, 67 yards

Statistics	RICE	TEX
First downs	14	18
Total yards	255	258
Rushes/yards	25/39	59/213
Passing yards	216	45
Passing: Comp–Att–Int	13–27–2	4–11–0
Time of possession		

Team	Category	Player	Statistics
Rice	Passing	TEAM	13–27, 216 yards, 1 TD, 2 INTs
Rice	Rushing	TEAM	25 car, 39 yards
Rice	Receiving	TEAM	13 rec, 216 yards, 1 TD
Texas	Passing	Duke Carlisle	4–11, 45 yards
Texas	Rushing	Tommy Ford	14 car, 69 yards, 1 TD
Texas	Receiving	Knox Nunnally	1 rec, 29 yards

=== At SMU ===
Texas Longhorns (6–0) vs. SMU Mustangs (2–3)

Quarter	1	2	3	4	Total
No. 1 Texas	7	10	0	0	17
SMU	0	6	0	6	12

at Cotton Bowl • Dallas, TX

- Date: Saturday, November 2, 1963
- Game time: 2:00 PM CDT
- Game weather: Fair, 61 °F (16 °C)
- Game attendance: 59,000
- Box Score

Game information

First Quarter

- (10:42) UT – Phil Harris 3 yard run, (Crosby kick), UT 7–0; 8 plays, 75 yards

Second Quarter

- (13:04) UT – Tommy Ford 2 yard run, (Crosby kick), UT 14–0; 3 plays, 4 yards
- (1:43) SMU – Gannon 22 yard pass from Thomas, (kick failed), UT 14–6; 12 plays, 38 yards
- (0:01) UT – Tony Crosby 34 yard field goal, UT 17–6; 5 plays, 12 yards

Fourth Quarter

- (5:57) SMU – Gannon 22 yard pass from White, (run failed), UT 17–12; 6 plays, 70 yards

Statistics	TEX	SMU
First downs	10	16
Total yards	265	291
Rushes/yards	49/194	34/115
Passing yards	71	176
Passing: Comp–Att–Int	5–17–1	37–16–1
Time of possession		

Team	Category	Player	Statistics
Texas	Passing	Tommy Wade	3–9, 48 yards
Texas	Rushing	Tommy Ford	13 car, 113 yards, 1 TD
Texas	Receiving	George Sauer	2 rec, 36 yards
SMU	Passing	TEAM	16–37, 176 yards, 2 TDs, 1 INT
SMU	Rushing	TEAM	34 car, 115 yards
SMU	Receiving	TEAM	16 rec, 176 yards, 2 TDs

=== Vs. Baylor ===
Baylor Bears (5–1) vs. Texas Longhorns (7–0)

Quarter	1	2	3	4	Total
Baylor	0	0	0	0	0
No. 1 Texas	0	0	7	0	7

at Memorial Stadium • Austin, TX

- Date: Saturday, November 9, 1963
- Game time: 2:00 PM CDT
- Game weather: Partly Cloudly, 64 °F (18 °C)
- Game attendance: 64,530
- Box Score

Game information

Third Quarter

- (1:55) UT – Tom Stockton 1 yard run, (Crosby kick), UT 7–0; 10 plays, 45 yards, 3:44

Statistics	BAY	TEX
First downs	13	17
Total yards	210	302
Rushes/yards	18/6	63/242
Passing yards	204	60
Passing: Comp–Att–Int	19–39–2	5–8–0
Time of possession		

Team	Category	Player	Statistics
Baylor	Passing	TEAM	19–39, 208 yards, 2 INTs
Baylor	Rushing	TEAM	18 car, 6 yards
Baylor	Receiving	TEAM	19 rec, 204 yards
Texas	Passing	Duke Carlisle	5–6, 60 yards
Texas	Rushing	Tommy Ford	27 car, 101 yards
Texas	Receiving	Charles Talber	2 rec, 27 yards

=== Vs. TCU ===
TCU Horned Frogs (3–3) vs. Texas Longhorns (8–0)

Quarter	1	2	3	4	Total
TCU	0	0	0	0	0
No. 1 Texas	0	10	7	0	17

at Memorial Stadium • Austin, TX

- Date: Saturday, November 16, 1963
- Game time: 2:00 PM CDT
- Game weather: Cloudly, 78 °F (26 °C)
- Game attendance: 58,000
- Box Score

Game information

Second Quarter

- (13:48) UT – Phil Harris 3 yard run, (Crosby kick), UT 7–0; 10 plays, 44 yards, 4:22
- (7:35) UT – Tony Crosby 42 yard field goal, UT 10–0; 8 plays, 6 yards

Third Quarter

- (1:10) UT – Tom Stockton 3 yard run, (Crosby kick), UT 17–0; 7 plays, 63 yards, 2:29

Statistics	TCU	TEX
First downs	12	18
Total yards	170	241
Rushes/yards	36/34	51/150
Passing yards	136	91
Passing: Comp–Att–Int	13–26–2	7–19–1
Time of possession		

Team	Category	Player	Statistics
TCU	Passing	TEAM	13–26, 136 yards, 2 INTs
TCU	Rushing	TEAM	36 car, 34 yards
TCU	Receiving	TEAM	13 rec, 136 yards
Texas	Passing	Duke Carlisle	7–17, 91 yards, 1 INT
Texas	Rushing	Tom Stockton	21 car, 89 yards, 1 TD
Texas	Receiving	Pete Lammons	3 rec, 52 yards

=== At Texas A&M ===
Texas Longhorns (9–0) vs. Texas A&M Aggies (2–6–1)

Quarter	1	2	3	4	Total
No. 1 Texas	3	0	0	12	15
Texas A&M	0	7	6	0	13

at Kyle Field • College Station, TX

- Date: Thursday, November 28, 1963
- Game time: 2:00 PM CDT
- Game weather: Overcast, 55 °F (13 °C)
- Game attendance: 41,820
- TV: CBS
- Box Score

Game information

First Quarter

- (5:02) UT – Tony Crosby 27 yard field goal, UT 3–0; 14 plays, 58 yards

Second Quarter

- (13:48) A&M – Reagan 54 yard pass from Keller, (Lee kick), TAMU 7–3; 6 plays, 73 yards

Third Quarter

- (8:27) A&M – Hargett 29 yard pass from Keller, (kick failed), TAMU 13–3; 8 plays, 56 yards

Fourth Quarter

- (13:23) UT – Tommy Ford 2 yard run, (run failed), TAMU 13–9; 9 plays, 35 yards
- (1:19) UT – Duke Carlisle 1 yard run, (run failed), UT 15–13; 15 plays, 80 yards

Statistics	TEX	TAMU
First downs	19	7
Total yards	315	186
Rushes/yards	55/214	40/95
Passing yards	101	91
Passing: Comp–Att–Int	11–28–3	2–5–1
Time of possession		

Team	Category	Player	Statistics
Texas	Passing	Tommy Wade	8–17, 89 yards, 2 INTs
Texas	Rushing	Tommy Ford	21 car, 113 yards, 1 TD
Texas	Receiving	Charles Talbert	5 rec, 47 yards
Texas A&M	Passing	TEAM	3–5, 91 yards, 2 TDs, 1 INT
Texas A&M	Rushing	TEAM	40 car, 95 yards
Texas A&M	Receiving	TEAM	3 rec, 91 yards, 2 TDs

=== Vs. Navy (Cotton Bowl) ===
1964 Cotton Bowl Classic: Navy Midshipmen (9–1) vs. Texas Longhorns (10–0)

Quarter	1	2	3	4	Total
No. 2 Navy	0	0	0	6	6
No. 1 Texas	7	14	7	0	28

at Cotton Bowl • Dallas, TX

- Date: Wednesday, January 1, 1964
- Game time: 1:00 PM CDT
- Game weather: Clear, 45 °F (7 °C)
- Game attendance: 75,300
- TV announcers (CBS): Chris Schenkel, Pat Summerall
- Box Score Game Recap

Game information

First Quarter

- (12:02) UT – Phil Harris 58 yard pass from Duke Carlisle, (Crosby kick), UT 7–0; 6 plays, 78 yards, 2:47

Second Quarter

- (9:54) UT – Phil Harris 63 yard pass from Duke Carlisle, (Crosby kick), UT 14–0; 1 play, 63 yards, 0:44
- (2:39) UT – Duke Carlisle 9 yard run, (Crosby kick), UT 21–0; 7 plays, 34 yards, 3:36

Third Quarter

- (2:40) UT – Harold Philipp 2 yard run, (Crosby kick), UT 28–0; 6 plays, 52 yards, 1:46

Fourth Quarter

- (11:59) NAVY – Roger Staubach 2 yard run, (Staubach pass failed), UT 28–6; 14 plays, 75 yards, 5:23

Statistics	NAVY	TEX
First downs	16	18
Total yards	213	402
Rushes/yards	29/-14	43/168
Passing yards	227	234
Passing: Comp–Att–Int	22–34–1	8–21–1
Time of possession		

Team	Category	Player	Statistics
Navy	Passing	Roger Staubach	21–31, 288 yards, 1 INT
Navy	Rushing	Donnelly	8 car, 12 yards
Navy	Receiving	Orr	9 rec, 112 yards
Texas	Passing	Duke Carlisle	7–19, 213 yards, 2 TDs, 1 INT
Texas	Rushing	Duke Carlisle	11 car, 54 yards, 1 TD
Texas	Receiving	Phil Harris	3 rec, 157 yards, 2 TDs

== Rankings ==
Ranking movements Legend: ██ Increase in ranking ██ Decrease in ranking
	Week												
Poll	Pre	1	2	3	4	5	6	7	8	9	10	11	Final
AP	5	4	3	2	1	1	1	1	1	1	1	1	1
UPI Coaches	Not released		3	2	1	1	1	1	1	1	1	1	1

== Personnel ==
=== Roster ===
1963 Texas Longhorns football team roster
Players
Coaches
Backfield

Pos.	#	Name	Class
QB	11	Duke Carlisle	Sr
QB	12	Marvin Kristynik	So
QB	14	Mike King	So
QB	15	Jake David	So
TB, QB	16	Les Derrick	So
QB	17	Tommy Wade	Sr
WB	20	Anthony King	Jr
WB	21	Joe Dixon	Jr
WB	22	Jim Hudson	Jr
FB	23	Ernie Koy (injured)	Jr
TB	24	Tommy Ford (C)	Jr
WB	25	Phil Harris	So
WB	26	Pat Williamson	So
FB	32	Timmy Doerr	Jr
FB	35	Harold Philipp	Jr
FB	36	Tom Stockton	So
FB	37	Fred Edwards	So
TB	41	Charles Buckalew	Jr
TB	46	Mike Boxwell	So
TB	47	Hix Green	Jr

Linemen

Pos.	#	Name	Class
C	50	David McWilliams (C)	Sr
C	52	Joe Galiga	So
C	53	Clarence Bray	Sr
OT	54	Howard Goad	So
C	55	Jack Howe	So
C	56	Rodney Kelley	So
SG	57	Bo Price	Jr
SG	58	Barney Giles	So
SG	60	Tommy Nobis	So
WG	61	Tom Currie	So
WG	62	Jim Besselman	Sr
ST	63	Clayton Lacy	Jr
C	64	Frank Bedrick	So
WG	66	George Brucks	Sr
WG	67	Kenneth Halm	Sr
WG	68	George Bass	Sr
SG	69	Olen Underwood	Jr
WT	70	Scott Appleton (C)	Sr
WT	71	Buddy Alldredge	So
WT	72	Lee Hensley	Jr
ST	73	Diron Talbert	So
ST	74	James Brooks	So
WT	75	Charles Echols	So
ST	76	Gordon Roberts	Sr
WT	77	Staley Faulkner	Sr
ST	78	Ken Ferguson	Sr
ST	79	Dwain James	So
WE	80	Dan Mauldin	So
WE	81	Bob Casseday	So
WE	83	Ben House	Sr
SE	84	George Sauer	So
SE	85	Sandy Sands	Sr
SE	86	Kenneth Brooks	So
WE	87	Pete Lammons	So
WE	88	Knox Nunnally	Jr
SE	89	Charles Talbert	Sr
E	90	Ronny Landry	So

Special teams

Pos.	#	Name	Class
WB, PK	28	Kim Gaynor	So
PK, E	91	Tony Crosby	Sr

Head coach

- Darrell Royal

Coordinators/assistant coaches

- Mike Campbell – Assistant
- Russell Coffee – Assistant
- Art Davis – Defensive backfield
- Bill Ellington – Assistant
- Jim Pittman – Assistant
- Bob Schulze – Assistant
- Charles Shira – Defensive coordinator

Legend

- (C) Team captain
- (S) Suspended
- (I) Ineligible
- Injured

Roster
Last update: 2/14/26

== Awards and honors ==
- Scott Appleton, tackle: Outland Trophy, consensus All-American

== 1963 Longhorns in the NFL ==
The following players were drafted into professional football following the season.

Player	Position	Round	Pick	Franchise	Source
Scott Appleton	Defensive Tackle	1	4	Dallas Cowboys (Note: Appleton was drafted by the Dallas Cowboys. Dallas traded their rights to Appleton to the Pittsburgh Steelers for Buddy Dial. The Houston Oilers ended up signing Appleton.)	
Duke Carlisle	Back	5	60	Green Bay Packers	
Walter (Sandy) Sands	End	12	159	Minnesota Vikings	

Ernie Koy, Jr. and Olen Underwood would be selected in the 1964 NFL Draft, while Tommy Nobis would be selected in the 1965 NFL Draft.
