= 1963 Missouri Tigers football team =

American college football season

1963 Missouri Tigers football
- Conference: Big Eight Conference

Ranking
- Coaches: No. T–16
- Record: 7–3 (5–2 Big 8)
- Head coach: Dan Devine (6th season)
- Home stadium: Memorial Stadium

1963 Big Eight Conference football standings
	Conf.					Overall
Team	W		L		T	W		L		T
No. 6 Nebraska $	7	–	0	–	0	10	–	1	–	0
No. 9 Oklahoma	6	–	1	–	0	8	–	2	–	0
Missouri	5	–	2	–	0	7	–	3	–	0
Kansas	3	–	4	–	0	5	–	5	–	0
Iowa State	3	–	4	–	0	4	–	5	–	0
Colorado	2	–	5	–	0	2	–	8	–	0
Kansas State	1	–	5	–	0	2	–	7	–	0
Oklahoma State	0	–	6	–	0	1	–	8	–	0
$ – Conference champion; Rankings from AP Poll

The 1963 Missouri Tigers football team was an American football team that represented the University of Missouri in the Big Eight Conference (Big 8) during the 1963 NCAA University Division football season. The team compiled a 7–3 record (5–2 against Big 8 opponents), finished in third place in the Big 8, and outscored opponents by a combined total of 151 to 86. Dan Devine was the head coach for the sixth of 13 seasons. The team played its home games at Memorial Stadium in Columbia, Missouri.

The team's statistical leaders included Carl Reese with 300 rushing yards, Gary Lane with 710 passing yards, 1,010 yards of total offense, and 36 points, Jim Johnson with 198 passing yards, and Ted Saussele with 115 receiving yards.

== Schedule ==
Date	Opponent	Site	Result	Attendance	Source
September 21	No. 6 Northwestern*	Memorial Stadium; Columbia, MO	L 12–23	45,000	
September 28	at No. 8 Arkansas*	War Memorial Stadium; Little Rock, AR (rivalry)	W 7–6	41,000	
October 5	Idaho*	Memorial Stadium; Columbia, MO	W 24–0	40,000	
October 12	Kansas State	Memorial Stadium; Columbia, MO	W 21–11	36,000	
October 19	at Oklahoma State	Lewis Field; Stillwater, OK	W 28–6	27,500	
October 26	at Iowa State	Clyde Williams Field; Ames, IA (rivalry)	W 7–0	23,500	
November 2	Nebraska	Memorial Stadium; Columbia, MO (rivalry)	L 12–13	50,500	
November 9	at Colorado	Folsom Field; Boulder, CO	W 28–7	23,000	
November 16	No. 5 Oklahoma	Memorial Stadium; Columbia, MO (rivalry)	L 3–13	50,800	
November 30	at Kansas	Memorial Stadium; Lawrence, KS (Border War)	W 9–7	45,000	
*Non-conference game; Rankings from AP Poll released prior to the game; Source:
