= 1963 Bluebonnet Bowl =

Baylor Bears	LSU Tigers
(8–3)	(7–4)
14	7
Head coach: John Bridgers	Head coach: Charles McClendon
AP / Coaches; NR / 20
	1	2	3	4	Total
Baylor	0	0	0	14	14
LSU	0	0	0	7	7
- Date: December 21, 1963
- Season: 1963
- Stadium: Rice Stadium
- Location: Houston, Texas
- Attendance: 50,000

The 1963 Bluebonnet Bowl was a college football postseason bowl game between the Baylor Bears of the Southwest Conference and the LSU Tigers of the SEC. Baylor won the game, 14–7.

Baylor entered the game with a 7–3 overall record and 6–1 conference record. The team was led by head coach John Bridgers. LSU entered the game with a 7–3 overall record and 4–2 conference record. The team was led by head coach Charles McClendon.

== Game summary ==
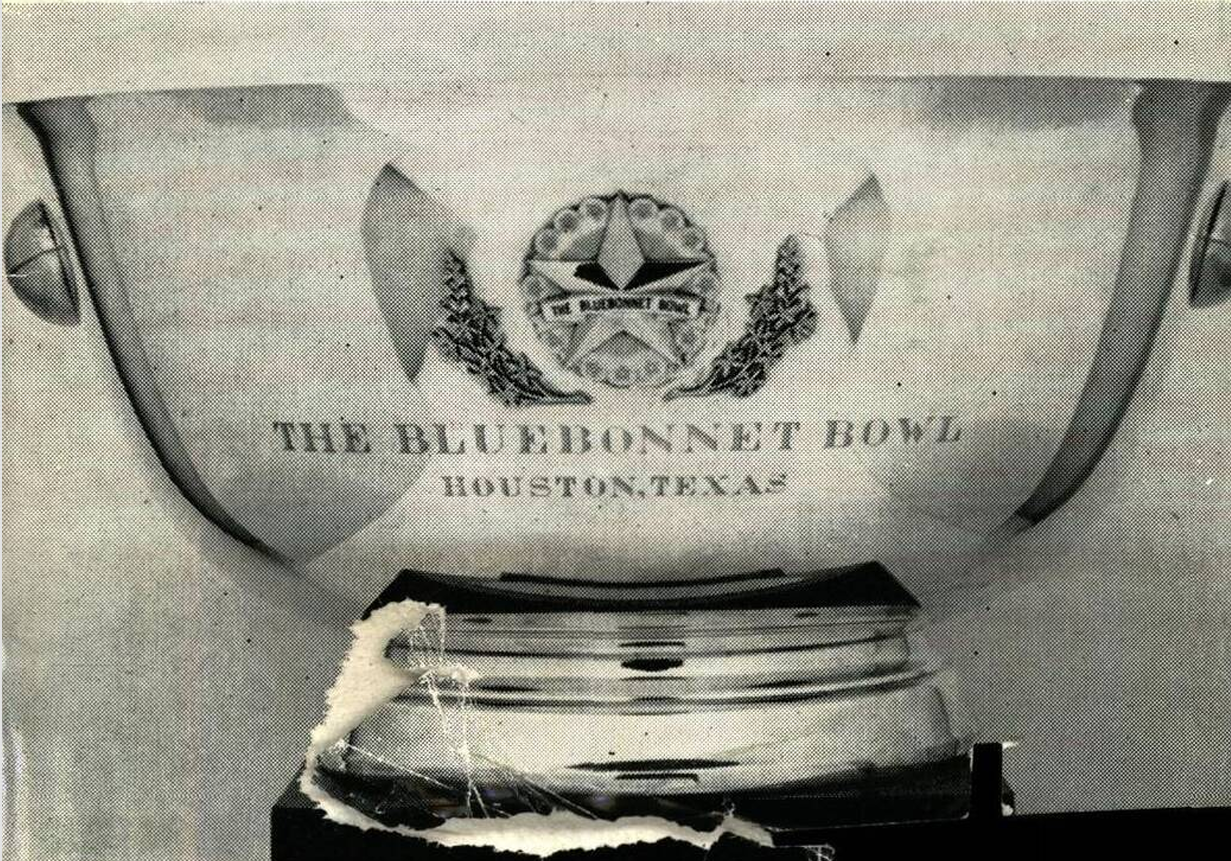
Trophy for the game

Baylor defeated LSU 14–7.
