= Phil Cutchin =

American football player and coach (1920–1999)

Biographical details
- Born: September 9, 1920; Mayfield, Kentucky, U.S.
- Died: January 7, 1999 (aged 78); Tulsa, Oklahoma, U.S.

Playing career

Football
- 1941–1942: Kentucky
- 1946: Kentucky

Baseball
- 1941–1942: Kentucky
- Position: Quarterback (football)

Coaching career (HC unless noted)

Football
- 1947–1949: Ohio Wesleyan (assistant)
- 1952–1953: Kentucky (backs)
- 1954–1957: Texas A&M (assistant)
- 1958–1962: Alabama (assistant)
- 1963–1968: Oklahoma State

Head coaching record
- Overall: 19–38–2

Phil Cutchin (September 9, 1920 – January 7, 1999) was an American football player and coach.

Cutchin was born in Mayfield, Kentucky, attended high school in Murray, Kentucky. His father was the basketball coach at Murray State College. He played college football at the University of Kentucky before he entered the United States Army during World War II.

Cutchin was an assistant football coach at Ohio Wesleyan University in 1948. He worked as an assistant coach under coach Bear Bryant and accompanied Bryant to coach at Texas A&M and Alabama. He was the head football coach at Oklahoma State University–Stillwater from 1963 to 1968, compiling a record of 19–38–2. Although he never had a winning season at Oklahoma State, he led the team to their first win over Oklahoma in 20 years.

Cutchin married Betsy Blevins in 1943; they had two children. Cutchin died in 1999, at the age of 78, in Tulsa.

== Head coaching record ==
Year	Team	Overall	Conference	Standing
Oklahoma State Cowboys (Big Eight Conference) (1963–1968)
1963	Oklahoma State	1–8	0–6	8th
1964	Oklahoma State	4–6	3–4	T–5th
1965	Oklahoma State	3–7	2–5	T–6th
1966	Oklahoma State	4–5–1	4–2–1	T–3rd
1967	Oklahoma State	4–5–1	3–4	T–5th
1968	Oklahoma State	3–7	2–5	T–6th
Oklahoma State:		19–38–2	14–26–1	
Total:		19–38–2		
