= 1963 Oklahoma State Cowboys football team =

American college football season

1963 Oklahoma State Cowboys football
- Conference: Big Eight Conference
- Record: 1–8 (0–6 Big 8)
- Head coach: Phil Cutchin (1st season)
- Home stadium: Lewis Field

1963 Big Eight Conference football standings
	Conf.					Overall
Team	W		L		T	W		L		T
No. 6 Nebraska $	7	–	0	–	0	10	–	1	–	0
No. 9 Oklahoma	6	–	1	–	0	8	–	2	–	0
Missouri	5	–	2	–	0	7	–	3	–	0
Kansas	3	–	4	–	0	5	–	5	–	0
Iowa State	3	–	4	–	0	4	–	5	–	0
Colorado	2	–	5	–	0	2	–	8	–	0
Kansas State	1	–	5	–	0	2	–	7	–	0
Oklahoma State	0	–	6	–	0	1	–	8	–	0
$ – Conference champion; Rankings from AP Poll

The 1963 Oklahoma State Cowboys football team represented Oklahoma State University as a member of the Big Eight Conference during the 1963 NCAA University Division football season. Led by first-year head coach Phil Cutchin, the Cowboys compiled an overall record of 1–8 with a mark of 0–6 in conference play, placing last out of eight teams in the Big 8.

== Schedule ==
Date	Opponent	Site	Result	Attendance	Source
September 21	at No. 8 Arkansas*	War Memorial Stadium; Little Rock, AR	L 0–21	41,000	
October 5	at No. 3 Texas*	Memorial Stadium; Austin, TX	L 7–34	48,000	
October 12	at Colorado	Folsom Field; Boulder, CO	L 0–25	35,600	
October 19	Missouri^{†}	Lewis Field; Stillwater, OK	L 6–28	27,500	
October 26	at Kansas	Memorial Stadium; Lawrence, KS	L 7–41	35,000	
November 2	at Iowa State	Clyde Williams Field; Ames, IA	L 28–33	20,000	
November 9	Tulsa*	Lewis Field; Stillwater, OK (rivalry)	W 33–24	15,000	
November 16	No. 10 Nebraska	Lewis Field; Stillwater, OK	L 16–20	17,500	
November 23	Kansas State	Lewis Field; Stillwater, OK	Canceled		
November 30	at No. 10 Oklahoma	Oklahoma Memorial Stadium; Norman, OK (Bedlam Series)	L 10–34	50,000	
*Non-conference game; ^{†}Homecoming; Rankings from AP Poll released prior to the game; Source:
