= 1963 Baylor Bears football team =

American college football season

1963 Baylor Bears football

Bluebonnet Bowl champion

Bluebonnet Bowl, W 14–7 vs. LSU
- Conference: Southwest Conference

Ranking
- Coaches: No. 20
- Record: 8–3 (6–1 SWC)
- Head coach: John Bridgers (5th season)
- Captains: Bobby Crenshaw; Don Trull
- Home stadium: Baylor Stadium

1963 Southwest Conference football standings
	Conf.					Overall
Team	W		L		T	W		L		T
No. 1 Texas $	7	–	0	–	0	11	–	0	–	0
Baylor	6	–	1	–	0	8	–	3	–	0
Rice	4	–	3	–	0	6	–	4	–	0
Arkansas	3	–	4	–	0	5	–	5	–	0
TCU	2	–	4	–	1	4	–	5	–	1
Texas Tech	2	–	5	–	0	5	–	5	–	0
SMU	2	–	5	–	0	4	–	7	–	0
Texas A&M	1	–	5	–	1	2	–	7	–	1
$ – Conference champion; Rankings from AP Poll

The 1963 Baylor Bears football team represented Baylor University in the Southwest Conference (SWC) during the 1963 NCAA University Division football season. In their fifth season under head coach John Bridgers, the Bears compiled an 8–3 record (6–1 against conference opponents), finished in second place in the conference, defeated LSU in the 1963 Bluebonnet Bowl, and outscored all opponents by a combined total of 205 to 120. They played their home games at Baylor Stadium in Waco, Texas.

The team's statistical leaders included Don Trull with 2,157 passing yards and 60 points scored, Dalton Hoffman with 458 rushing yards, and Larry Elkins with 873 receiving yards. Trull and Bobby Crenshaw were the team captains.

== Schedule ==
Date	Opponent	Site	TV	Result	Attendance	Source
September 28	Houston*	Baylor Stadium; Waco, TX (rivalry)		W 27–0	20,000	
October 5	at Oregon State*	Multnomah Stadium; Portland, OR		L 15–22	24,342	
October 12	Arkansas	Baylor Stadium; Waco, TX		W 14–10	33,000	
October 19	at Texas Tech	Jones Stadium; Lubbock, TX (rivalry)		W 21–17	32,000	
October 26	at Texas A&M	Kyle Field; College Station, TX (rivalry)		W 34–7	21,000	
November 2	TCU^{†}	Baylor Stadium; Waco, TX (rivalry)		W 32–13	36,000	
November 9	at No. 1 Texas	Memorial Stadium; Austin, TX (rivalry)		L 0–7	64,530	
November 16	Kentucky*	Baylor Stadium; Waco, TX		L 7–19	18,000	
November 30	at Rice	Rice Stadium; Houston, TX		W 21–12	40,000	
December 7	SMU	Baylor Stadium; Waco, TX		W 20–6	26,000	
December 21	vs. LSU*	Rice Stadium; Houston, TX (Bluebonnet Bowl)	CBS	W 14–7	50,000	
*Non-conference game; ^{†}Homecoming; Rankings from AP Poll released prior to the game
