= 1963 Iowa State Cyclones football team =

American college football season

1963 Iowa State Cyclones football
- Conference: Big Eight Conference
- Record: 4–5 (3–4 Big 8)
- Head coach: Clay Stapleton (6th season)
- Captain: Dave Hoover
- Home stadium: Clyde Williams Field

1963 Big Eight Conference football standings
| | Conf. | | | | | Overall |
| Team | W | | L | | T | W | | L | | T |
|---|---|---|---|---|---|---|---|---|---|---|
| No. 6 Nebraska $ | 7 | – | 0 | – | 0 | 10 | – | 1 | – | 0 |
| No. 9 Oklahoma | 6 | – | 1 | – | 0 | 8 | – | 2 | – | 0 |
| Missouri | 5 | – | 2 | – | 0 | 7 | – | 3 | – | 0 |
| Kansas | 3 | – | 4 | – | 0 | 5 | – | 5 | – | 0 |
| Iowa State | 3 | – | 4 | – | 0 | 4 | – | 5 | – | 0 |
| Colorado | 2 | – | 5 | – | 0 | 2 | – | 8 | – | 0 |
| Kansas State | 1 | – | 5 | – | 0 | 2 | – | 7 | – | 0 |
| Oklahoma State | 0 | – | 6 | – | 0 | 1 | – | 8 | – | 0 |
$ – Conference champion; Rankings from AP Poll

The 1963 Iowa State Cyclones football team represented Iowa State University in the Big Eight Conference during the 1963 NCAA University Division football season. In their sixth year under head coach Clay Stapleton, the Cyclones compiled a 4–5 record (3–4 against conference opponents), tied for fourth place in the conference, and were outscored by opponents by a combined total of 143 to 129. They played their home games at Clyde Williams Field in Ames, Iowa.

The regular starting lineup on offense consisted of left end Randy Kidd, left tackle Norm Taylor, left guard Chuck Steimle, center John Berrington, right guard Tim Brown, right tackle John Van Sicklen, right end Larry Hannahs, quarterback Ken Bunte, halfbacks Ozzie Clay and Dick Limerick, and fullback Tom Vaughn. Dave Hoover was the team captain.

The team's statistical leaders included Tom Vaughn with 795 rushing yards, Ken Bunte with 347 passing yards, Dick Limerick with 339 receiving yards and 59 points scored (five touchdowns, five field goals, and 14 extra points). Two Iowa State players were selected as first-team all-conference players: center John Berrington and fullback Tom Vaughn.

== Schedule ==
| Date | Time | Opponent | Site | Result | Attendance | Source |
|---|---|---|---|---|---|---|
| September 21 | 2:30 pm | at California* | California Memorial Stadium; Berkeley, CA | L 8–15 | 31,500 | |
| September 28 | 1:30 pm | VMI* | Clyde Williams Field; Ames, IA | W 21–6 | 14,530 | |
| October 5 | 2:00 pm | at Nebraska | Memorial Stadium; Lincoln, NE (rivalry) | L 7–21 | 37,000 | |
| October 12 | 1:30 pm | at Kansas | Memorial Stadium; Lawrence, KS | W 17–14 | 34,000 | |
| October 19 | 2:30 pm | at Colorado | Folsom Field; Boulder, CO | W 19–7 | 27,500 | |
| October 26 | 1:30 pm | Missouri | Clyde Williams Field; Ames, IA (rivalry) | L 0–7 | 23,500 | |
| November 2 | 1:30 pm | Oklahoma State^{†} | Clyde Williams Field; Ames, IA | W 33–28 | 20,000 | |
| November 9 | 1:30 pm | at No. 6 Oklahoma | Oklahoma Memorial Stadium; Norman, OK | L 14–24 | 50,000 | |
| November 16 | 1:30 pm | Kansas State | Clyde Williams Field; Ames, IA (rivalry) | L 10–21 | 14,000 | |
| November 23 | 1:30 pm | Drake | Drake Stadium; Des Moines, IA | Canceled | | |
*Non-conference game; ^{†}Homecoming; Rankings from AP Poll released prior to the game; All times are in Central time; Source:
