= 1964 Cotton Bowl Classic =

- 28th Cotton Bowl Classic; National Championship Game (Note: Through luck and fortuitous scheduling, a "national championship game" was occasionally able to settle the matter on the field, as described in some contemporaneous reports. Despite the promotional billing, in several instances there were plausible scenarios for a third team to be selected as national champion by the major selectors, depending on outcomes of other games.) (Note: FWAA only; Texas had already been named No. 1 in the final AP and Coaches Polls three weeks earlier.)
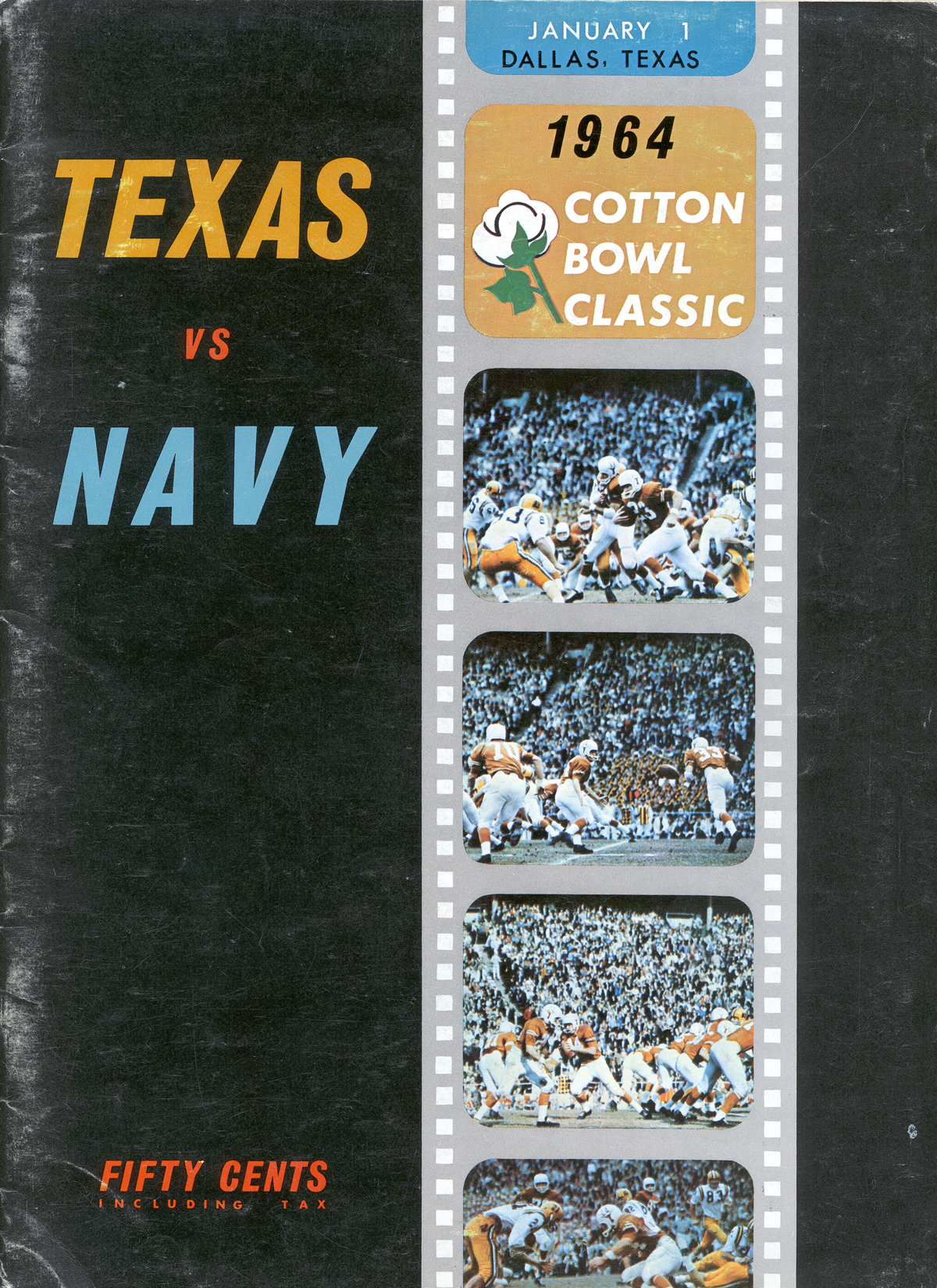
Navy Midshipmen	Texas Longhorns
(9–1)	(10–0)
Independent	SWC
6	28
Head coach: Wayne Hardin	Head coach: Darrell Royal
AP / Coaches; 2 / 2	AP / Coaches; 1 / 1
	1	2	3	4	Total
Navy	0	0	0	6	6
Texas	7	14	7	0	28
- Date: January 1, 1964
- Season: 1963
- Stadium: Cotton Bowl
- Location: Dallas, Texas
- MVP: Scott Appleton (DL Texas); Duke Carlisle (QB Texas)
- Favorite: Texas (slight)
- Referee: David Buchanan (EAIFO; split crew: EAIFO, SWC)
- Attendance: 75,504

United States TV coverage
- Network: CBS
- Announcers: Chris Schenkel, Pat Summerall
- Nielsen ratings: 27.3

The Cotton Bowl in Dallas, Texas, hosted the Cotton Bowl Classic.

The 1964 Cotton Bowl Classic was the 28th edition of the college football bowl game, played at the Cotton Bowl in Dallas, Texas, on Wednesday, January 1. Part of the 1963–64 bowl game season, the game was a de facto national championship game, as both teams would be playing for the FWAA’s Grantland Rice Trophy. The top-ranked and undefeated Texas Longhorns, champions of the Southwest Conference, defeated the #2 Navy Midshipmen, 28–6, winning their first ever national title.

In this era, the final major polls (AP, UPI) were published prior to the bowl games, so Texas would retain those national championships, regardless of the outcome.

== Teams ==
The game was played less than six weeks after the assassination of President Kennedy, a U.S. Navy veteran and avid football fan, in the same city. It was the second #1 versus #2 bowl game, after the previous season's Rose Bowl.

=== Texas ===
Texas had won all ten games in the regular season, took the Southwest Conference title, and was first in the polls. This was their third consecutive Cotton Bowl.

=== Navy ===
Independent Navy was second in the polls, and featured junior quarterback Roger Staubach, the 1963 Heisman Trophy winner. Their only setback was a four-point loss at SMU (in the Cotton Bowl) in mid-October. Texas won at SMU, 17-12, three weeks later.

== Game summary ==
The Cotton Bowl kicked off at 1 pm CST, as did the Sugar and Orange Bowls. The temperature was 45 °F (7 °C) and skies were sunny.

Two touchdown catches by Phil Harris from Duke Carlisle and a Carlisle touchdown run gave the Longhorns a 21–0 lead at halftime. Another touchdown run by fullback Harold Philipp increased the lead to 28–0 after three quarters. The Midshipmen finally scored on a two-yard touchdown run by Staubach (who went 22 for 34 for 228 yards), which ended the scoring at 28–6.

While the two teams had near even passing yards and near even first downs (18-16), Navy had 29 rushes go for -14 yards while Texas' 43 rushes for 168 yards led to two touchdowns as the Longhorns clinched an undisputed national championship, their first ever. Several Cotton Bowl records were set.

1964 Cotton Bowl Classic: Navy Midshipmen (9–1) vs. Texas Longhorns (10–0)

Quarter	1	2	3	4	Total
No. 2 Navy	0	0	0	6	6
No. 1 Texas	7	14	7	0	28

at Cotton Bowl • Dallas, TX

- Date: Wednesday, January 1, 1964
- Game time: 1:00 PM CDT
- Game weather: Clear, 45 °F (7 °C)
- Game attendance: 75,300
- TV announcers (CBS): Chris Schenkel, Pat Summerall
- Box Score Game Recap

Game information

First Quarter

- (12:02) UT – Phil Harris 58 yard pass from Duke Carlisle, (Crosby kick), UT 7–0; 6 plays, 78 yards, 2:47

Second Quarter

- (9:54) UT – Phil Harris 63 yard pass from Duke Carlisle, (Crosby kick), UT 14–0; 1 play, 63 yards, 0:44
- (2:39) UT – Duke Carlisle 9 yard run, (Crosby kick), UT 21–0; 7 plays, 34 yards, 3:36

Third Quarter

- (2:40) UT – Harold Philipp 2 yard run, (Crosby kick), UT 28–0; 6 plays, 52 yards, 1:46

Fourth Quarter

- (11:59) NAVY – Roger Staubach 2 yard run, (Staubach pass failed), UT 28–6; 14 plays, 75 yards, 5:23

Statistics	NAVY	TEX
First downs	16	18
Total yards	213	402
Rushes/yards	29/-14	43/168
Passing yards	227	234
Passing: Comp–Att–Int	22–34–1	8–21–1
Time of possession		

Team	Category	Player	Statistics
Navy	Passing	Roger Staubach	21–31, 288 yards, 1 INT
Navy	Rushing	Donnelly	8 car, 12 yards
Navy	Receiving	Orr	9 rec, 112 yards
Texas	Passing	Duke Carlisle	7–19, 213 yards, 2 TDs, 1 INT
Texas	Rushing	Duke Carlisle	11 car, 54 yards, 1 TD
Texas	Receiving	Phil Harris	3 rec, 157 yards, 2 TDs

== Statistics ==
Statistics	Navy	Texas
First downs	16	18
Yards rushing	-14	168
Yards passing	227	234
Passing (C-A-I)	22–34–1	8–21–1
Punts-Average	6–36.5	3–43.3
Fumbles lost	2	1
Penalized yards	35	72

== Aftermath ==
The next major bowl for Texas was the following year in the Orange Bowl, the first played at night, and another win. The next Cotton Bowl for the Longhorns was five years later in January 1969, the first of six consecutive appearances.

Navy had previously played in each of the four major bowls once; this remains their most recent major bowl and their next bowl appearance was in 1978.
