= 1963 Kansas Jayhawks football team =

American college football season

1963 Kansas Jayhawks football
- Conference: Big Eight Conference
- Record: 5–5 (3–4 Big 8)
- Head coach: Jack Mitchell (6th season)
- Captains: Ken Coleman; Pete Quatrochi
- Home stadium: Memorial Stadium

1963 Big Eight Conference football standings
	Conf.					Overall
Team	W		L		T	W		L		T
No. 6 Nebraska $	7	–	0	–	0	10	–	1	–	0
No. 9 Oklahoma	6	–	1	–	0	8	–	2	–	0
Missouri	5	–	2	–	0	7	–	3	–	0
Kansas	3	–	4	–	0	5	–	5	–	0
Iowa State	3	–	4	–	0	4	–	5	–	0
Colorado	2	–	5	–	0	2	–	8	–	0
Kansas State	1	–	5	–	0	2	–	7	–	0
Oklahoma State	0	–	6	–	0	1	–	8	–	0
$ – Conference champion; Rankings from AP Poll

The 1963 Kansas Jayhawks football team represented the University of Kansas in the Big Eight Conference during the 1963 NCAA University Division football season. In their sixth season under head coach Jack Mitchell, the Jayhawks compiled a 5–5 record (3–4 against conference opponents), tied for fourth in the Big Eight Conference, and outscored all opponents by a combined total of 207 to 122. They played their home games at Memorial Stadium in Lawrence, Kansas.

The team's statistical leaders included Gale Sayers with 917 rushing yards and 155 receiving yards and Steve Renko with 505 passing yards. Ken Coleman and Pete Quatrochi were the team captains.

== Schedule ==
Date	Opponent	Site	Result	Attendance	Source
September 21	at TCU*	Amon G. Carter Stadium; Fort Worth, TX	L 6–10	26,000	
September 28	Syracuse*	Memorial Stadium; Lawrence, KS	W 10–0	35,000	
October 5	at Wyoming*	War Memorial Stadium; Laramie, WY	W 25–21	18,121	
October 12	Iowa State	Memorial Stadium; Lawrence, KS	L 14–17	34,000	
October 19	at No. 6 Oklahoma	Oklahoma Memorial Stadium; Norman, OK	L 18–21	61,826	
October 26	Oklahoma State	Memorial Stadium; Lawrence, KS	W 41–7	35,000	
November 2	Kansas State^{†}	Memorial Stadium; Lawrence, KS (rivalry)	W 34–0	30,000	
November 9	at Nebraska	Memorial Stadium; Lincoln, NE (rivalry)	L 9–23	39,500	
November 16	at Colorado	Folsom Field; Boulder, CO	W 43–14	21,000	
November 30	Missouri	Memorial Stadium; Lawrence, KS (Border War)	L 7–9	45,000	
*Non-conference game; ^{†}Homecoming; Rankings from AP Poll released prior to the game; Source:

== Roster ==
1963 Kansas Jayhawks football team roster
Players			Coaches
Offense: Pos. / # / Name / Class; RB / 48 / Gale Sayers / Jr	Defense: Pos. / # / Name / Class	Special teams: Pos. / # / Name / Class	Head coach Jack Mitchell Coordinators/assistant coaches Legend: (C) Team captain; (S) Suspended; (I) Ineligible; Injured; Redshirt
