= 1963 Nebraska Cornhuskers football team =

American college football season

1963 Nebraska Cornhuskers football

Big Eight champion Orange Bowl champion

Orange Bowl, W 13–7 vs. Auburn
- Conference: Big Eight Conference

Ranking
- Coaches: No. 5
- AP: No. 6
- Record: 10–1 (7–0 Big Eight)
- Head coach: Bob Devaney (2nd season)
- Home stadium: Memorial Stadium

1963 Big Eight Conference football standings
	Conf.					Overall
Team	W		L		T	W		L		T
No. 6 Nebraska $	7	–	0	–	0	10	–	1	–	0
No. 9 Oklahoma	6	–	1	–	0	8	–	2	–	0
Missouri	5	–	2	–	0	7	–	3	–	0
Kansas	3	–	4	–	0	5	–	5	–	0
Iowa State	3	–	4	–	0	4	–	5	–	0
Colorado	2	–	5	–	0	2	–	8	–	0
Kansas State	1	–	5	–	0	2	–	7	–	0
Oklahoma State	0	–	6	–	0	1	–	8	–	0
$ – Conference champion; Rankings from AP Poll

The 1963 Nebraska Cornhuskers football team was the representative of the University of Nebraska and member of the Big Eight Conference in the 1963 NCAA University Division football season. The team was coached by Bob Devaney and played their home games at Memorial Stadium in Lincoln, Nebraska.

== Schedule ==
Date	Time	Opponent	Rank	Site	TV	Result	Attendance	Source
September 21	2:00 pm	South Dakota State*		Memorial Stadium; Lincoln, NE		W 58–7	31,000	
September 28	1:30 pm	at Minnesota*		Memorial Stadium; Minneapolis, MN (rivalry)		W 14–7	61,140	
October 5	2:00 pm	Iowa State		Memorial Stadium; Lincoln, NE (rivalry)		W 21–7	37,000	
October 12	2:00 pm	Air Force*		Memorial Stadium; Lincoln, NE		L 13–17	38,000	
October 19	1:30 pm	at Kansas State		Memorial Stadium; Manhattan, KS (rivalry)		W 28–6	16,500	
October 26	2:00 pm	Colorado^{†}		Memorial Stadium; Lincoln, NE (rivalry)		W 41–6	37,000	
November 2	1:30 pm	at Missouri		Memorial Stadium; Columbia, MO (rivalry)		W 13–12	50,500	
November 9	2:00 pm	Kansas		Memorial Stadium; Lincoln, NE (rivalry)		W 23–9	39,500	
November 16	1:30 pm	at Oklahoma State	No. 10	Lewis Field; Stillwater, OK		W 20–16	17,500	
November 23	2:00 pm	No. 6 Oklahoma	No. 10	Memorial Stadium; Lincoln, NE (rivalry)		W 29–20	38,485	
January 1	1:00 pm	vs. No. 5 Auburn*	No. 6	Miami Orange Bowl; Miami, FL (Orange Bowl)	ABC	W 13–7	72,647	
*Non-conference game; ^{†}Homecoming; Rankings from AP Poll released prior to the game; All times are in Central time; Source:

== Roster ==
Official Roster
69 Abel, John RG (So.); 42 Allers, LaVerne LG (So.); 56 Baffico, James C (Sr.); 50 Barnes, Walter C (So.); 58 Bishop, John C (So.); 76 Brichacek, Gary RT (So.); 73 Brown, James RT (So.); 64 Brown, Robert RG (Sr.); 80 Callahan, Richard E (Sr.); 78 Carlson, Dennis LT (So.); 89 Casey, Larry E (So.); 14 Claridge, Dennis QB (Sr.); 62 Coleman, (Edward) Ricard RG (So.); 48 Cotton, Thomas LT (So.); 72 Czap, Dick RT (So.); 66 Dervin, John LG (Jr.); 67 Dillard, Louis LG (So.); 82 Doepke, Charles E (Jr.); 65 Drum, Duncan RG (Jr.); 10 Duda, Fred QB (So.); 38 Earl, William E (So.); 81 Fisher, Pat E (Jr.); 70 Fugitt, Mike LT (Jr.); 79 Griesse, Ronald RG (Sr.); 87 Haug, William E (So.); 18 Hohn, Robert HB (Jr.); 84 Jeter, Tony E (So.); 31 Johnson, Rudy FB (Sr.); 28 Johnson, William FB (Jr.); 75 Jones, Robert LT (Sr.); 40 Kennedy, Michael HB (So.); 77 Kiffin, Monte RT (Sr.); 68 Kirby, John LG (Sr.); 86 Koinzan, John E (Jr.); 75 Kramer, Larry LT (Jr.); 15 Lebsack, Dave QB (So.); 88 Love, Preston E (Jr.)	32 McCloughan, Kent HB (Jr.); 63 McDermott, Donald RG (Jr.); 25 McGinn, Bernard FB (Jr.); 41 McNulty, Joe FB (Jr.); 54 Michka, Ron C (Sr.); 29 Myslenski, Rick E (So.); 37 Osberg, James RG (So.); 33 Paschell, Willie HB (Jr.); 61 Pavoris, Ed LG (So.); 30 Petersen, Kelly FB (So.); 26 Poggemeyer, Ronald HB (So.); 47 Riley, Robert LG (So.); 57 Rogers, Bill LG (Jr.); 21 Ross, Willie HB (Sr.); 59 Rudd, Michael LT (So.); 51 Schaefer, Steve C (So.); 49 Schmitzer, Larry LG (So.); 35 Sebastian, John HB (Jr.); 52 Sittler, Lyle C (Jr.); 22 Smidt, Maynard HB (Jr.); 43 Smith, Bruce FB (Jr.); 45 Solich, Frank HB (So.); 53 Strosnider, Don C (So.); 23 Theisen, David HB (Sr.); 83 Tomlinson, Larry E (Sr.); 12 Tucker, Douglas QB (Jr.); 55 Tuthill, Harry C (Jr.); 46 Vactor, Theodore (Red) HB (So.); 71 Voss, Lloyd RT (Sr.); 24 Vujevich, John HB (Jr.); 85 White, Freeman E (So.); 11 Woods, Henry QB (So.); 34 Worley, Michael FB (So.); 36 Wright, Bruce LG (So.); 27 Wright, Ted HB (Jr.); 44 Young, Gene FB (Sr.)

== Depth chart ==
Defensive starters

HB
Kent McCloughan
Fred Duda

HB
Bobby Hohn
Bruce Smith

LB	LB
John Dervin	Bob Brown
John Kirby	Bernie McGinn

CB
David Theisen
Maynard Smidt

DE	DT	NT	DT	DE
Tony Jeter	Lloyd Voss	Ron Michka	Larry Kramer	Larry Tomlinson
Richard Callahan	Monte Kiffin	Lyle Sittler	Robert Jones	Freeman White

CB
Richard Callahan
Ted Vactor

Offensive starters

LE
Larry Tomlinson
Freeman White

LG	C	RG	LT	RT
John Kirby	Ron Michka	Bob Brown	Larry Kramer	Lloyd Voss
John Dervin	Lyle Sittler	Bernie McGinn	Robert Jones	Monte Kiffin

RE
Tony Jeter
Richard Callahan

QB
Dennis Claridge
Fred Duda
Doug Tucker

LB	RB	FB
Willie Ross	Bobby Hohn	Rudy Johnson
Maynard Smidt	Kent McCloughan	Bruce Smith

== Coaching staff ==
Name	Title	First year in this position	Years at Nebraska	Alma mater
Bob Devaney	Head Coach	1962	1962–1972	Alma
John Melton		1962	1962–1988	Wyoming
Cletus Fischer		1960	1960–1985	Nebraska
Mike Corgan	Running Backs	1962	1962–1982	Notre Dame
George Kelly		1961	1961–1968	Notre Dame
Jim Ross		1962	1962–1976	Eastern Michigan
Carl Selmer	Offensive Line	1962	1962–1972	Wyoming

== Game summaries ==
=== South Dakota State ===
Team	1	2	3	4	Total
South Dakota State	0	0	0	7	7
• Nebraska	14	23	21	0	58

- Date: September 21
- Location: Memorial Stadium, Lincoln, Nebraska
- Game attendance: 34,493

=== Minnesota ===
Team	1	2	3	4	Total
• Nebraska	7	0	0	7	14
Minnesota	7	0	0	0	7

- Date: September 28
- Location: Memorial Stadium, Minneapolis
- Game attendance: 60,711

=== Iowa State ===
Team	1	2	3	4	Total
Iowa State	0	7	0	0	7
• Nebraska	7	0	6	8	21

- Date: October 5
- Location: Memorial Stadium, Lincoln, Nebraska
- Game attendance: 37,640

=== Air Force ===
Team	1	2	3	4	Total
• Air Force	0	7	3	7	17
Nebraska	0	0	13	0	13

- Date: October 12
- Location: Memorial Stadium, Lincoln, Nebraska
- Game attendance: 38,067

=== Kansas State ===
Team	1	2	3	4	Total
• Nebraska	0	14	14	0	28
Kansas State	0	6	0	0	6

- Date: October 19
- Location: Memorial Stadium, Manhattan, Kansas
- Game attendance: 14,920

=== Colorado ===
Team	1	2	3	4	Total
Colorado	6	0	0	0	6
• Nebraska	7	7	13	14	41

- Date: October 26
- Location: Memorial Stadium, Lincoln, Nebraska
- Game attendance: 37,630

=== Missouri ===
Team	1	2	3	4	Total
• Nebraska	7	0	0	6	13
Missouri	0	6	0	6	12

- Date: November 2
- Location: Faurot Field, Columbia, Missouri
- Game attendance: 52,877

=== Kansas ===
Team	1	2	3	4	Total
Kansas	0	3	0	6	9
• Nebraska	10	0	0	13	23

- Date: November 9
- Location: Memorial Stadium, Lincoln, Nebraska
- Game attendance: 39,844

=== Oklahoma State ===
Team	1	2	3	4	Total
• #10 Nebraska	0	14	6	0	20
Oklahoma State	0	3	0	13	16

- Date: November 16
- Location: Lewis Field, Stillwater, Oklahoma
- Game attendance: 20,078

=== Oklahoma ===
Team	1	2	3	4	Total
#6 Oklahoma	0	0	0	20	20
• #10 Nebraska	3	0	7	19	29

- Date: November 23
- Location: Memorial Stadium, Lincoln, Nebraska
- Game attendance: 38,362

This game was almost canceled due to the assassination of President John F. Kennedy the day before. But both schools eventually agreed to hold the game anyway. It was one of only 5 games across the country played that day.

=== Auburn ===
Team	1	2	3	4	Total
• #6 Nebraska	10	3	0	0	13
#5 Auburn	0	0	7	0	7

- Date: January 1
- Location: Miami Orange Bowl, Miami, Florida
- Game attendance: 72,647
- Game weather: 68 °F (20 °C), Wind NW 13 mph, 49% Humidity
- Referee: Pat Haggerty

== Rankings ==
Ranking movements Legend: ██ Increase in ranking ██ Decrease in ranking — = Not ranked
	Week												
Poll	Pre	1	2	3	4	5	6	7	8	9	10	11	Final
AP	—	—	—	—	—	—	—	—	—	10	10	6	5
Coaches	N/A	N/A	N/A	N/A	N/A	N/A	N/A	N/A	N/A	N/A	N/A	N/A	6

== Awards ==
- All American: Robert Brown
- National Lineman of the Year: Bob Brown
- All Big Eight: Bob Brown, Dennis Claridge, Lloyd Voss
- Big Eight Player of the Year: Dennis Claridge

== Future professional players ==
- Robert Brown, 1964 2nd-round pick of the Philadelphia Eagles
- James Brown, 1966 13th-round pick of the St. Louis Cardinals
- Dennis Claridge, 1963 3rd-round pick of the Green Bay Packers
- Dick Czap, 1966 12th-round pick of the Cleveland Browns
- Rudy Johnson, 1964 5th-round pick of the San Francisco 49ers
- Robert Jones, 1964 18th-round pick of the Washington Redskins
- Monte Kiffin, 1964 15th-round pick of the Minnesota Vikings
- Tony Jeter, 1966 3rd-round pick of the Green Bay Packers
- John Kirby, 1964 5th-round pick of the Minnesota Vikings
- Larry Kramer, 1964 15th-round pick of the Indianapolis Colts
- Preston Love, 1965 19th-round pick of the Detroit Lions
- Kent McCloughan, 1965 3rd-round pick of the Washington Redskins
- Willie Ross, 1964 9th-round pick of the St. Louis Cardinals
- David Theisen, 1963 11th-round pick of the Los Angeles Rams
- Lloyd Voss, 1964 1st-round pick of the Green Bay Packers
- Freeman White, 1966 9th-round pick of the New York Giants
