= 1963 Rice Owls football team =

American college football season

1963 Rice Owls football
- Conference: Southwest Conference
- Record: 6–4 (4–3 SWC)
- Head coach: Jess Neely (24th season)
- Home stadium: Rice Stadium

1963 Southwest Conference football standings
| | Conf. | | | | | Overall |
| Team | W | | L | | T | W | | L | | T |
|---|---|---|---|---|---|---|---|---|---|---|
| No. 1 Texas $ | 7 | – | 0 | – | 0 | 11 | – | 0 | – | 0 |
| Baylor | 6 | – | 1 | – | 0 | 8 | – | 3 | – | 0 |
| Rice | 4 | – | 3 | – | 0 | 6 | – | 4 | – | 0 |
| Arkansas | 3 | – | 4 | – | 0 | 5 | – | 5 | – | 0 |
| TCU | 2 | – | 4 | – | 1 | 4 | – | 5 | – | 1 |
| Texas Tech | 2 | – | 5 | – | 0 | 5 | – | 5 | – | 0 |
| SMU | 2 | – | 5 | – | 0 | 4 | – | 7 | – | 0 |
| Texas A&M | 1 | – | 5 | – | 1 | 2 | – | 7 | – | 1 |
$ – Conference champion; Rankings from AP Poll

The 1963 Rice Owls football team represented Rice University during the 1963 NCAA University Division football season. In its 24th season under head coach Jess Neely, the team compiled a 6–4 record and outscored opponents by a total of 145 to 114. The team played its home games at Rice Stadium in Houston.

The team's statistical leaders included Walter McReynolds with 728 passing yards, Paul Piper with 475 rushing yards, and John Sylvester with 251 receiving yards. Two Rice players were selected by the Associated Press (AP) and/or United Press International (UPI) as first-team players on the 1963 All-Southwest Conference football team: center Malcolm Walker (AP-1, UPI-1); and guard Johnny Nichols (AP-1).

== Schedule ==
| Date | Opponent | Site | Result | Attendance | Source |
|---|---|---|---|---|---|
| September 28 | LSU* | Rice Stadium; Houston, TX | W 21–12 | 64,000 | |
| October 5 | at Penn State* | Beaver Stadium; University Park, PA | L 7–28 | 38,200 | |
| October 12 | Stanford* | Rice Stadium; Houston, TX | W 23–13 | 30,000 | |
| October 19 | SMU | Rice Stadium; Houston, TX (rivalry) | W 13–7 | 52,000 | |
| October 26 | at No. 1 Texas | Memorial Stadium; Austin, TX (rivalry) | L 6–10 | 64,130 | |
| November 2 | at Texas Tech | Jones Stadium; Lubbock, TX | W 17–3 | 36,500 | |
| November 9 | Arkansas | Rice Stadium; Houston, TX | W 7–0 | 41,000 | |
| November 16 | Texas A&M | Rice Stadium; Houston, TX | L 6–13 | 46,000 | |
| November 30 | Baylor | Rice Stadium; Houston, TX | L 12–21 | 40,000 | |
| December 7 | at TCU | Amon G. Carter Stadium; Fort Worth, TX | W 33–7 | 13,000 | |
*Non-conference game; Rankings from AP Poll released prior to the game
