= 1963 Navy Midshipmen football team =

American college football season

1963 Navy Midshipmen football

Eastern champion

Cotton Bowl Classic, L 6–28 vs. Texas
- Conference: Independent

Ranking
- Coaches: No. 2
- AP: No. 2
- Record: 9–2
- Head coach: Wayne Hardin (5th season)
- Captain: Thomas Lynch
- Home stadium: Navy–Marine Corps Memorial Stadium

1963 NCAA University Division independents football records
	Conf.			Overall
Team	W	L	T	W		L		T
No. 14 Memphis State		–		9	–	0	–	1
No. 3 Pittsburgh		–		9	–	1	–	0
No. 2 Navy		–		9	–	2	–	0
No. 12 Syracuse		–		8	–	2	–	0
Utah State		–		8	–	2	–	0
Oregon		–		8	–	3	–	0
No. 16 Penn State		–		7	–	3	–	0
Army		–		7	–	3	–	0
Air Force		–		7	–	4	–	0
Boston College		–		6	–	3	–	0
Buffalo		–		5	–	3	–	1
Southern Miss		–		5	–	3	–	1
Villanova		–		5	–	4	–	0
Oregon State		–		5	–	5	–	0
San Jose State		–		5	–	5	–	0
Xavier		–		5	–	4	–	1
West Texas State		–		4	–	4	–	1
Florida State		–		4	–	5	–	1
Colgate		–		3	–	4	–	1
New Mexico State		–		3	–	6	–	1
Colorado State		–		3	–	7	–	0
Miami (FL)		–		3	–	7	–	0
Texas Western		–		3	–	7	–	0
Detroit		–		2	–	6	–	1
Holy Cross		–		2	–	6	–	1
Notre Dame		–		2	–	7	–	0
Pacific (CA)		–		2	–	8	–	0
Houston		–		2	–	8	–	0
Boston University		–		1	–	6	–	1
Dayton		–		1	–	7	–	2
Rankings from Coaches Poll

The 1963 Navy Midshipmen football team represented the United States Naval Academy as an independent in the 1963 NCAA University Division football season. Led by fifth-year head coach Wayne Hardin, the Midshipmen finished the year with an overall record of 9–2 and a loss against Texas in the Cotton Bowl Classic.

Quarterback Roger Staubach won the Heisman Trophy and the Maxwell Award while leading the Midshipmen to a 9–1 regular season record and a final ranking of No. 2 in the nation. He led Navy to victory over their annual rivalry with Notre Dame, which would be the Midshipmen's last win over Notre Dame until 2007. In the Crab Bowl Classic, Navy defeated Maryland by a score of 42–7. There was talk of cancelling the Army–Navy Game in the aftermath of the assassination of President John F. Kennedy, but his widow, Jacqueline, insisted that the game should be played. No. 2 Navy accepted an invitation to play in the 1964 Cotton Bowl Classic versus No. 1 Texas, the second No. 1 versus No. 2 bowl game in college football history.

== Schedule ==
Date	Opponent	Rank	Site	Result	Attendance	Source
September 21	at West Virginia	No. 9	Mountaineer Field; Morgantown, WV	W 51–7	35,000	
September 28	William & Mary^{†}	No. 5	Navy–Marine Corps Memorial Stadium; Annapolis, MD	W 28–0	19,230	
October 5	at Michigan	No. 6	Michigan Stadium; Ann Arbor, MI	W 26–13	55,877	
October 11	at SMU	No. 4	Cotton Bowl; Dallas TX (rivalry)	L 28–32	37,000	
October 19	vs. VMI	No. 10	Foreman Field; Norfolk, VA (Oyster Bowl)	W 21–12	31,500	
October 26	No. 3 Pittsburgh	No. 10	Navy–Marine Corps Memorial Stadium; Annapolis, MD	W 24–12	30,231	
November 2	at Notre Dame	No. 4	Notre Dame Stadium; Notre Dame, IN (rivalry)	W 35–14	59,362	
November 9	Maryland	No. 4	Navy–Marine Corps Memorial Stadium; Annapolis, MD (rivalry)	W 42–7	30,035	
November 16	at Duke	No. 2	Wallace Wade Stadium; Durham, NC	W 38–25	41,000	
December 7	vs. Army	No. 2	Philadelphia Municipal Stadium; Philadelphia, PA (Army–Navy Game)	W 21–15	100,000	
January 1, 1964	vs. No. 1 Texas	No. 2	Cotton Bowl Stadium; Dallas, TX (Cotton Bowl)	L 6–28	75,504	
^{†}Homecoming; Rankings from AP Poll released prior to the game; Source:

== Roster ==
1963 Navy Midshipmen football team roster
Players			Coaches
Offense: Pos. / # / Name / Class; QB / / Roger Staubach / Jr	Defense: Pos. / # / Name / Class	Special teams: Pos. / # / Name / Class	Head coach: Wayne Hardin; Coordinators/assistant coaches Legend: (C) Team captain; (S) Suspended; (I) Ineligible; Injured; Redshirt

== Team players in the NFL ==
- 1964 NFL draft

Player	Position	Round	Pick	NFL club
Roger Staubach	Quarterback	10	129	Dallas Cowboys

== Awards and honors ==
- Roger Staubach – Heisman Trophy, Walter Camp Memorial Trophy
