= First Community Stadium =

Stadium in Houston, Texas, US

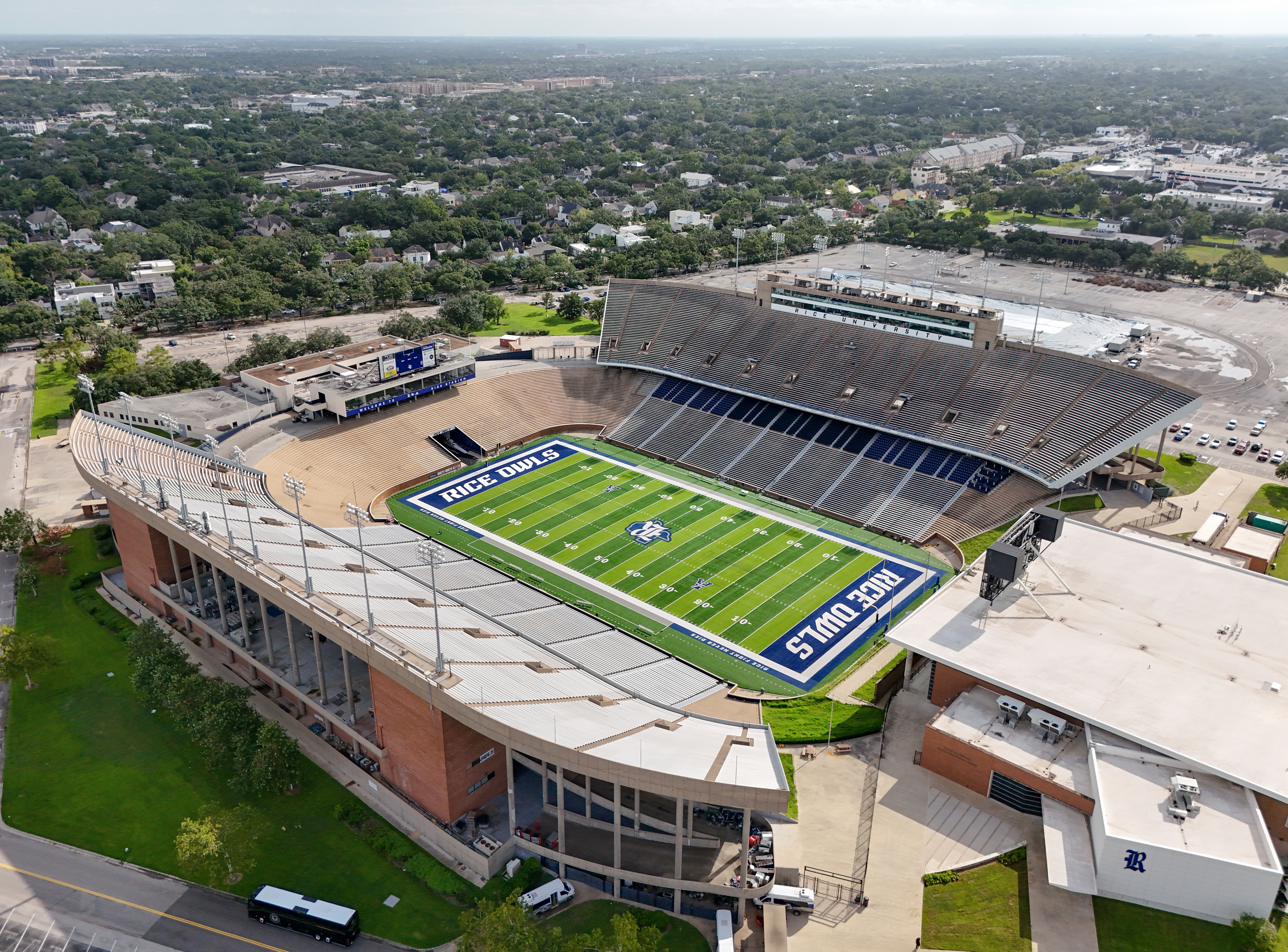
- The stadium in 2024

- Location in the United States Location in Texas
- Former names: Houston Stadium; Rice Stadium
- Location: 6100 South Main Street; Houston, Texas, U.S.
- Coordinates: 29°42′59″N 95°24′33″W
- Owner: Rice University
- Operator: Rice University
- Capacity: 47,000 (expandable to 59,000); Super Bowl VIII (68,142)
- Surface: Natural grass (1950–1969); AstroTurf (1970–2005); FieldTurf (2006–2014); AstroTurf GameDay Grass 3D60H (2014–present)

Construction
- Groundbreaking: February 1950
- Opened: September 30, 1950
- Cost: $3.295 million ($44.1 million in 2025 dollars)
- Architects: Hermon Lloyd & W.B. Morgan and Milton McGinty
- Structural engineer: Walter P Moore
- General contractor: Brown & Root Constructors

Tenants
- Rice Owls (NCAA) (1950–present); Houston Cougars (NCAA) (1951–1964); Texas Southern Tigers (NCAA) (1971–2000); Bluebonnet Bowl (1959–1967, 1985-1986); Houston Oilers (AFL) (1965–1967); Houston Roughnecks (UFL) (2024)

First Community Stadium (formerly Rice Stadium) is an American football stadium located on the Rice University campus in Houston, Texas. It has been the home of the Rice Owls football team since its completion in 1950, and hosted John F. Kennedy's "We choose to go to the Moon" speech in 1962 and Super Bowl VIII in early 1974.

First Community Stadium is an example of modern architecture, with simple lines and an unadorned, functional design. The lower seating bowl is located below the surrounding ground level. Built solely for football, the stadium has excellent sightlines from almost every seat. To achieve this, the running track was eliminated so that spectators were closer to the action and each side of the upper decks was brought in at a concave angle to provide better sightlines. It is still recognized in many circles as the best stadium in Texas for watching a football game. Entrances and aisles were strategically placed so that the entire stadium could be emptied of spectators in nine minutes.

In 2006, Rice University upgraded the facility by switching from AstroTurf to FieldTurf and adding a modern scoreboard above the north concourse. Seating in the upper deck is in poor condition, which led the university to move home games for which large crowds were expected to nearby Reliant Stadium.

High school football games, especially neutral-site playoff games, are frequently played at First Community Stadium. It can also be used as a concert venue.

== History ==
Rice Stadium replaced Rice Field (now Wendel D. Ley Track and Holloway Field), which had a total capacity of less than 37,000, in 1950. The new stadium was subsidized by the City of Houston, and it was designed by Hermon Lloyd & W. B. Morgan and Milton McGinty and built by Brown and Root.

In addition to Rice, the University of Houston Cougars played at Rice Stadium from 1951 through 1964, and the former Bluebonnet Bowl was played there from 1959 to 1967, and in 1985 and 1986. The Houston Oilers of the American Football League (AFL) played in the stadium for three seasons (1965–1967), then moved to the Astrodome in 1968.

In January 1974, the venue hosted Super Bowl VIII, the first played in Texas, in which the defending champion Miami Dolphins defeated the Minnesota Vikings 24–7 with 68,142 in attendance. The game returned to Houston thirty years later in February 2004, for Super Bowl XXXVIII at Reliant Stadium.

In October 2026, the stadium was renamed to First Community Stadium following a 20 year naming rights deal with locally based First Community Credit Union.

=== John F. Kennedy speech ===
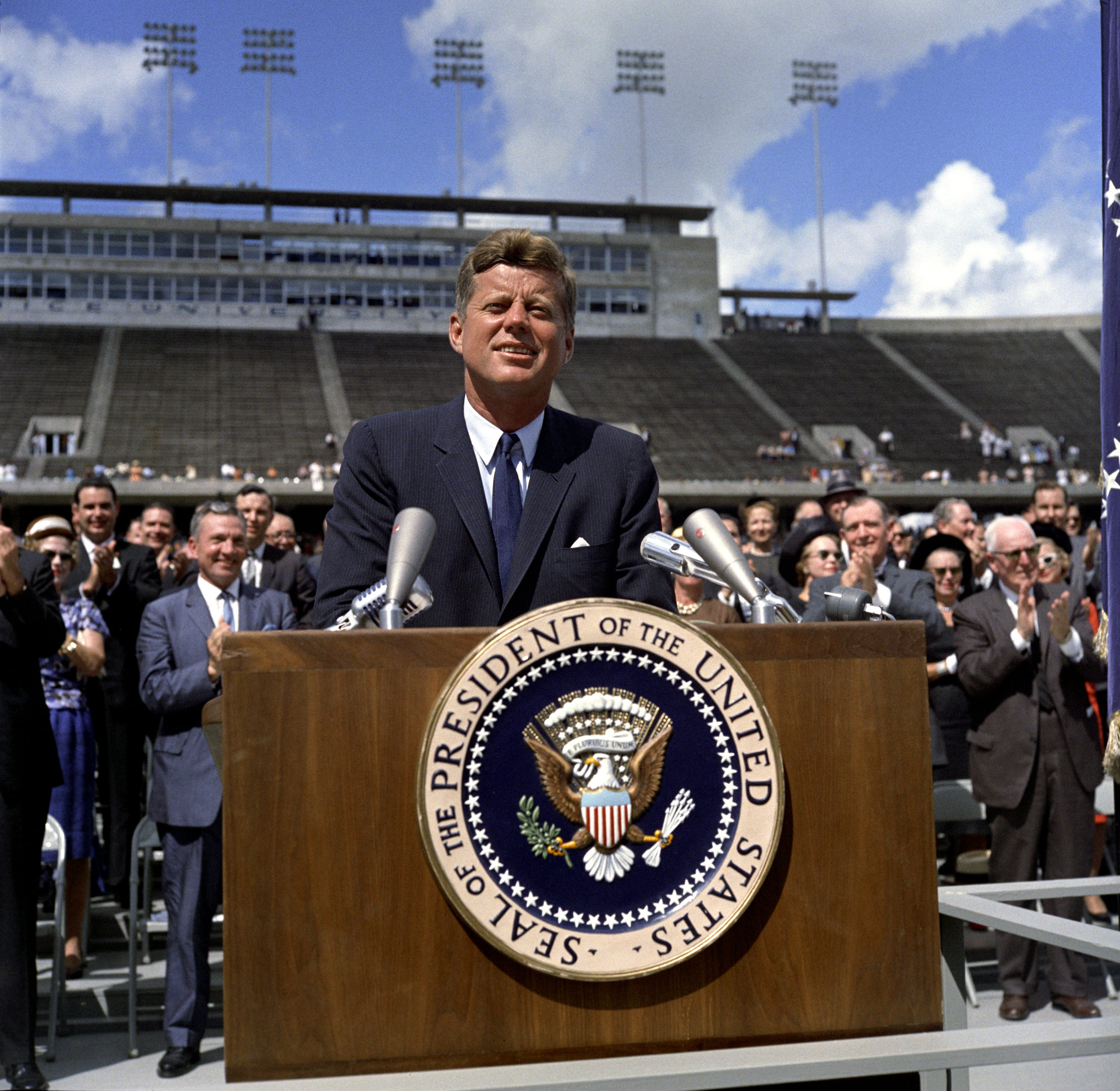
President Kennedy speaks at Rice Stadium on the American space program in 1962

On September 12, 1962, Rice Stadium hosted the speech in which President John F. Kennedy challenged Americans to meet his goal, set the previous year, to send a man to the Moon by the end of the decade. In the Wednesday afternoon speech, he used a reference to Rice University football to help frame his rhetoric:

"But why, some say, the Moon? Why choose this as our goal? And they may well ask, why climb the highest mountain? Why, 35 years ago, fly the Atlantic? Why does Rice play Texas? We choose to go to the Moon. We choose to go to the Moon. We choose to go to the Moon in this decade and do the other things, not because they are easy, but because they are hard, because that goal will serve to organize and measure the best of our energies and skills, because that challenge is one that we are willing to accept, one we are unwilling to postpone, and one which we intend to win, and the others, too."

Kennedy's comments implied Rice had a history of losing to Texas; however, the two football teams had split 5–5 in their previous ten meetings and tied the following month. On the other hand, Kennedy's comments about Rice-Texas might have been as forward-looking as his statements about going to the Moon (which did occur in 1969): Since 1963, Rice has gone just 2–43 (.044) against Texas, including 28 straight losses between 1966 and 1993 and 16 straight from 1995 to the present.

== Year by year ==
Season	Head Coach	Conference	Avg. Crowd	Home Record
2017	David Bailiff	Conference USA	19,354	0–5
2018	Mike Bloomgren	Conference USA	20,172	2–4
2019	Mike Bloomgren	Conference USA	18,845	1–5
2020	Mike Bloomgren	Conference USA	1,000	0–2
2021	Mike Bloomgren	Conference USA	18,613	3–3
2022	Mike Bloomgren	Conference USA	19,011	4–2
2023	Mike Bloomgren	American Conference (Note: Known as the American Athletic Conference before the 2025 season.)	20,542	4–3
2024	Mike Bloomgren	American Conference	18,143	4–2
2025	Scott Abell	American Conference	23,423	3–4
2026	Scott Abell	American Conference	15,374	1–3

=== Capacity reduction ===
As originally built, Rice Stadium seated 70,000, the second-largest stadium in the Southwest Conference (behind the Cotton Bowl). Rice Stadium was built before professional football came to Houston and while Rice was still competitive in the Southwest Conference. It was reasonable to expect 70,000 fans to attend a college football game there. However, as Rice declined on the field from the 1960s onward, the Owls found it increasingly difficult to fill the stadium. Even crowds of 30,000 were swallowed up in the environment.

In 2006, the end zone seats were covered with tarps, reducing the regular seating capacity to 47,000. The northern end zone was later demolished. As of 2023, the school continued exploring options for a modern seating arrangement with a reduced capacity.

In November 2025, the university announced the Gateway Project, a $120 million project to better connect the Rice campus to the adjacent Rice Village shopping and restaurant district. As part of the project, Rice Stadium will be further downsized to slightly over 30,000 capacity. On the stadium's west side, the upper level and existing press box will be demolished and replaced with a new west concourse building, consisting mostly of premium seating but including a new media center, coaches' booths, and athletic department offices. About half of the east side upper level will be removed. The overall project is currently set for completion in 2028.

== Features ==
=== Brian Patterson Sports Performance Center ===
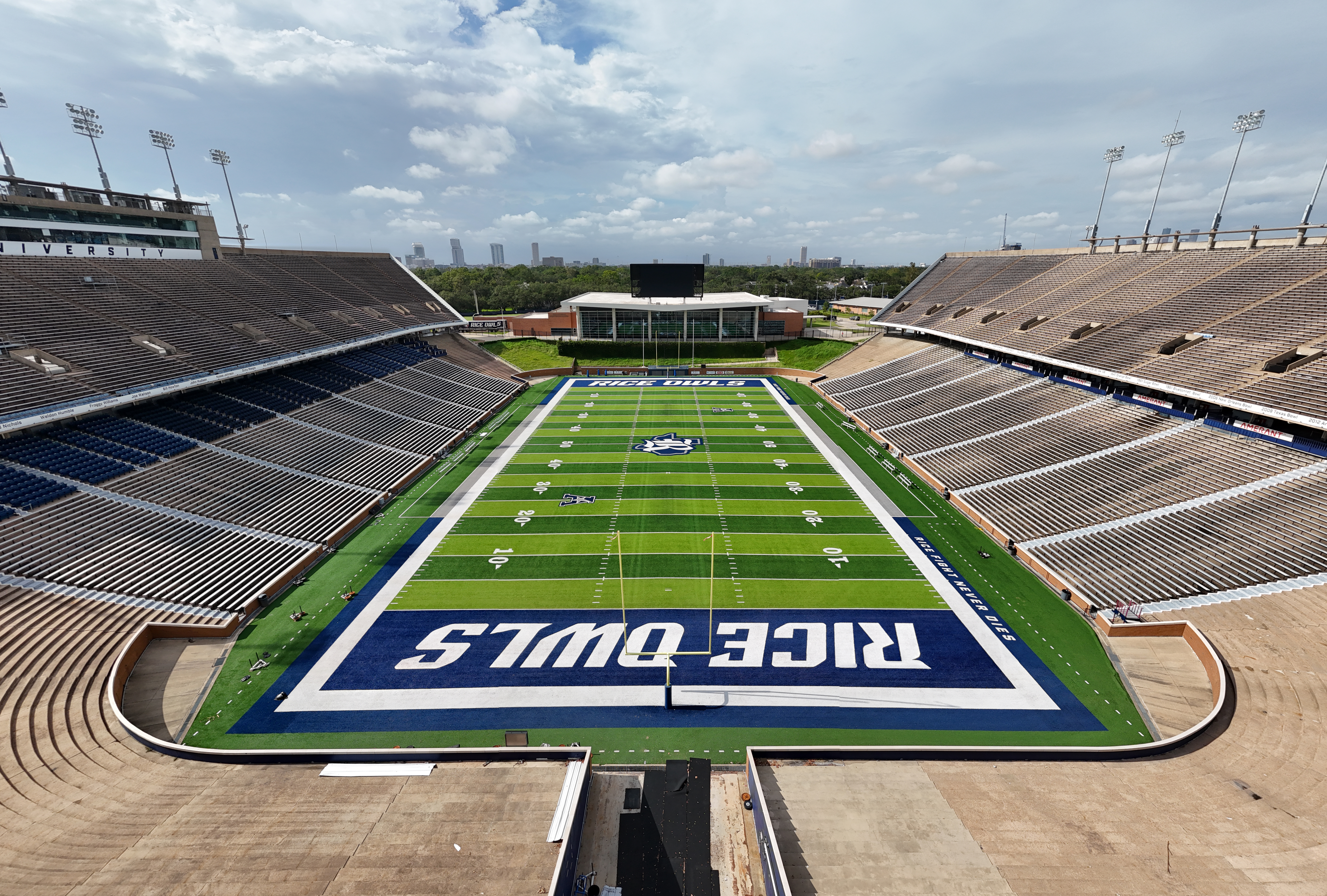
The Brian Patterson Sports Performance Center is located behind the northern end zone

Around July 2015, construction began on the Brian Patterson Sports Performance Center. This building makes up the north end of the stadium, and contain a weight room, a home team locker room, coaching and staff offices. This replaced the north end seating that consisted of crude concrete steps and was unused. The building was named for donor and former Rice University football player and alumnus Brian Patterson.

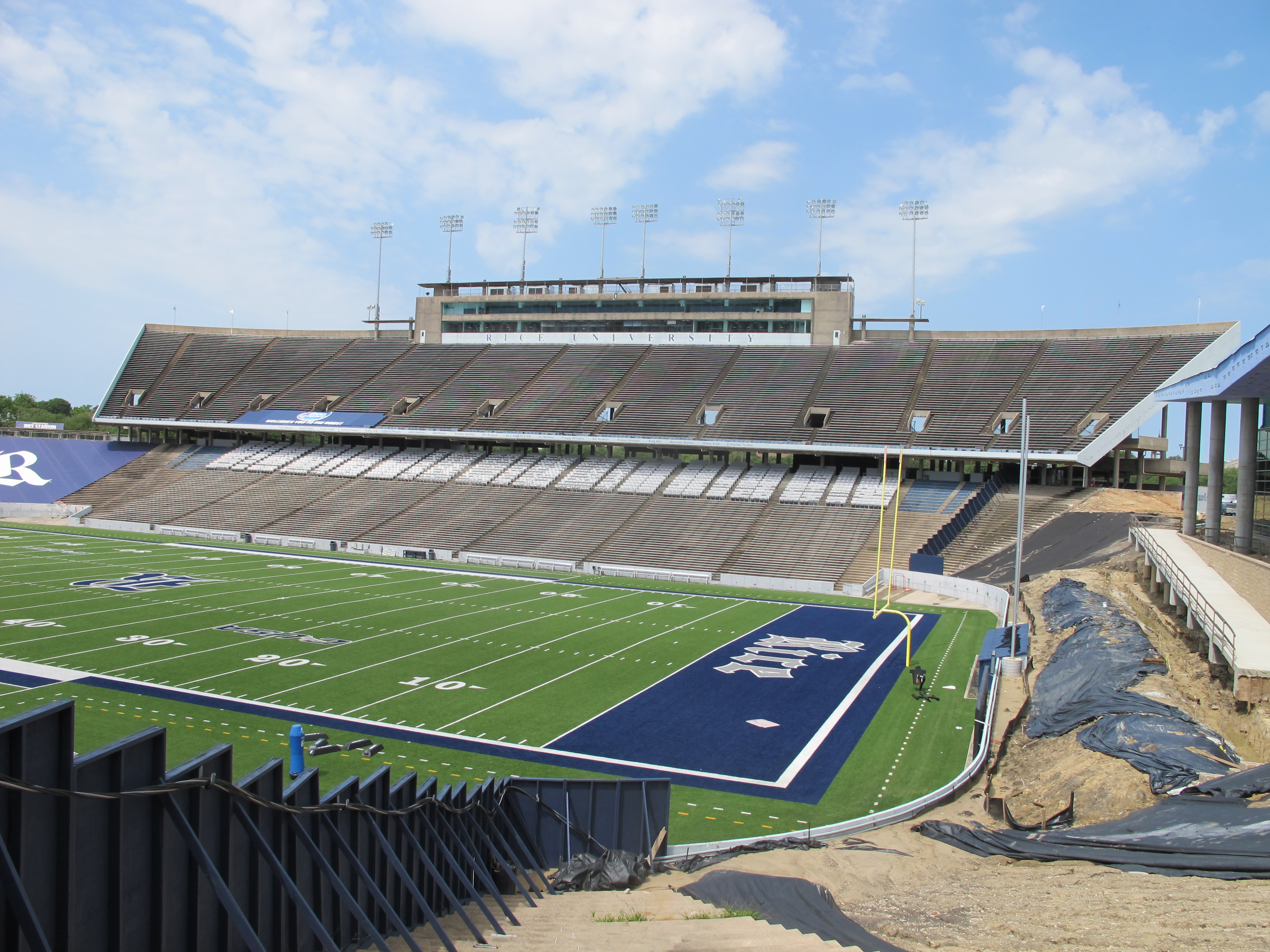
Rice Stadium, Press Box Side 2016

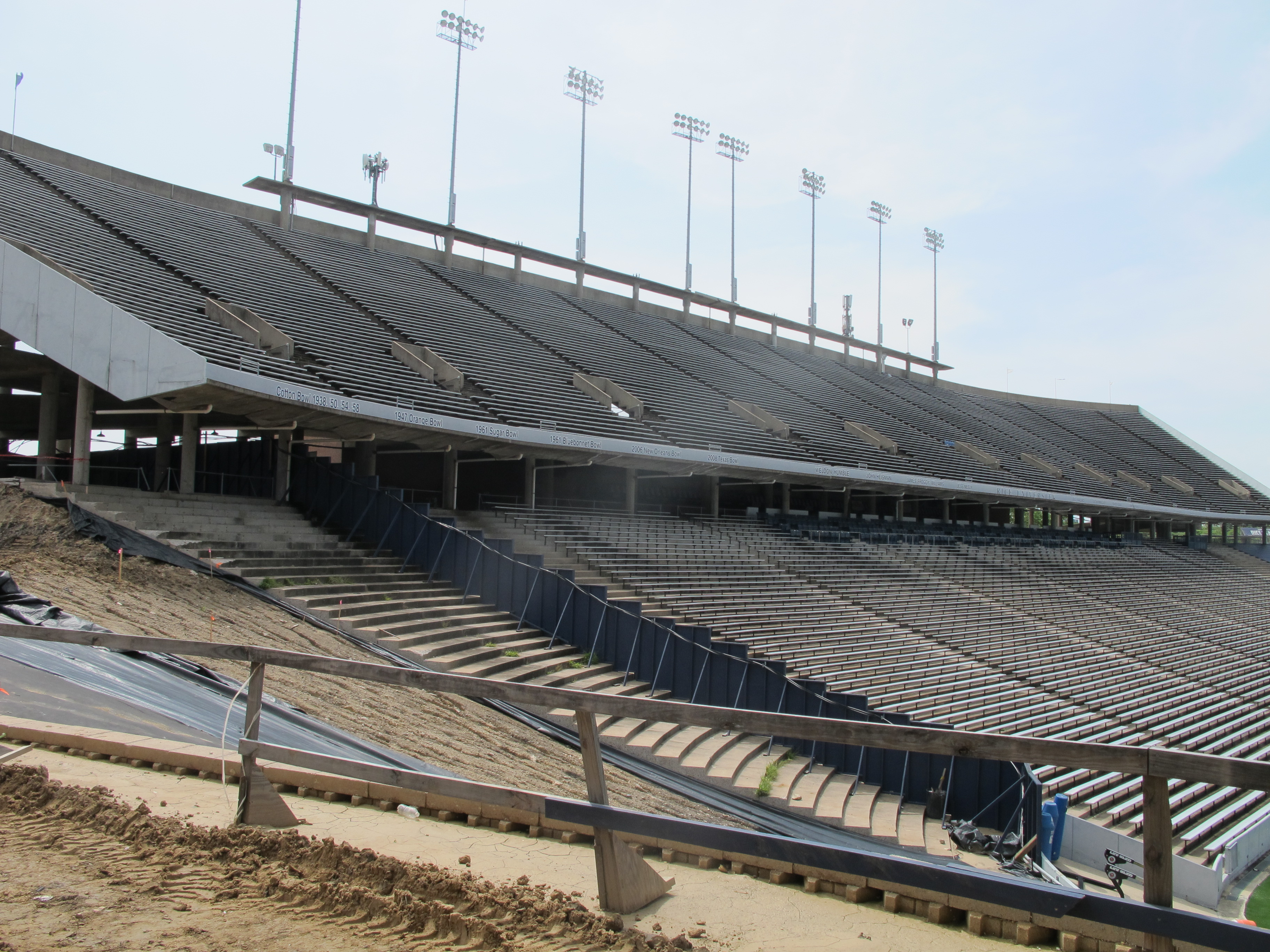
Rice Stadium 2016

=== Robert L. Waltrip Training Center ===
On May 9, 2019, the Rice University Board of Trustees approved a proposal for an air-supported multipurpose facility on the west side of Rice Stadium that will offer climate-protected space for varsity athletics training, campus recreation and Rice student events, activities and community partner events. The 80,000 square foot inflatable structure rose up from the infield area of the bike track west of Rice Stadium for the first time in late July 2020, creating a facility to house practices, intramurals and other events when weather put those events in peril.

== See also ==
- List of NCAA Division I FBS football stadiums

Events and tenants
Preceded by first stadium Astrodome	Home of the Bluebonnet Bowl; 1959 – 1967; 1985 – 1986	Succeeded by Astrodome
Preceded by Jeppesen Stadium	Home of the Houston Oilers; 1965 – 1967	Succeeded by Astrodome
Preceded by Los Angeles Memorial Coliseum	Host of Super Bowl VIII; 1974	Succeeded by Tulane Stadium
