= List of Nebraska Cornhuskers bowl games =

Nebraska played fifteen bowl games at the Miami Orange Bowl.

This list of Nebraska Cornhuskers bowl games shows the bowl games the Nebraska Cornhuskers football program has participated in since the inception of college football's bowl system in 1902. Nebraska has played in fifty-five bowl games, including a record thirty-five straight from 1969 to 2003, with a record of 27–27.

== History ==
In 1915, Nebraska was invited to face Northwest Conference champion Washington State in the second bowl game ever played, but university officials balked at the cost of sending the team to Pasadena and declined. NU played its first bowl game in the 1941 Rose Bowl, losing to eventual national champion Stanford. Nebraska was invited to the 1955 Orange Bowl despite its 6–4 record (conference rules prevented champion Oklahoma from appearing in consecutive seasons), falling to Duke 34–7 at Burdine Stadium (later the Miami Orange Bowl) in its first of seventeen Orange Bowl appearances.

Bob Devaney's inaugural season ended with the first bowl victory in program history, a 36–34 win over Miami in the 1962 Gotham Bowl. Three years later, he took Nebraska to its first national championship game (though it was not yet an official designation) against Alabama in the 1966 Orange Bowl; Bear Bryant's Crimson Tide won 39–28 in the first of three bowl meetings between the coaches. Nebraska did not appear in a bowl game in 1967 or 1968, but returned to postseason play in 1969 and began an NCAA-record streak of thirty-five consecutive seasons with a bowl appearance. (Note: Florida State reached a bowl game in thirty-six consecutive seasons from 1982 to 2017, but its 2006 Emerald Bowl appearance was vacated by the NCAA, which recognizes Nebraska as the record holder.) NU won eight of its first nine games in this stretch under Devaney and Osborne, including two national championships. Nebraska regularly featured in the Orange Bowl due to the Big Eight's bowl affiliations; its 1983 defeat to Miami is considered one of college football's greatest games.

NU lost seven straight bowl games two decades into Osborne's tenure, many of them uncompetitive defeats to southeastern opposition. After a controversial championship game loss in 1993, he won his first major-poll national championship in 1994, avenging three previous Orange Bowl losses to Miami. Osborne retired after taking Nebraska to seven straight New Year's Six bowl games. NU's lengthy bowl streak continued through Frank Solich’s tenure but ended in 2004.

Nebraska missed a bowl game in 2017 for the first time in ten years, beginning a seven-year stretch without postseason play that covered Scott Frost's entire tenure as head coach. Nebraska returned to a bowl game in 2024.

== List of bowl games ==
National championship game (Note: Prior to 1992, if the eventual AP or Coaches champion appeared in the game. After 1992, the designated national championship game from the Bowl Coalition, Bowl Alliance, Bowl Championship Series, or College Football Playoff.)	Nebraska win	Nebraska loss

No.	Date	Bowl	Winning team		Losing team		City	Stadium	Attendance
1	Jan. 1, 1941	Rose	No. 2 Stanford	21	No. 7 Nebraska	13	Pasadena, CA	Rose Bowl	92,000
2	Jan. 1, 1955	Orange	No. 14 Duke	34	Nebraska	7	Miami, FL	Miami Orange Bowl	68,750
3	Dec. 15, 1962	Gotham	Nebraska	36	Miami	34	New York City, NY	Yankee Stadium	6,166
4	Jan. 1, 1964	Orange	No. 6 Nebraska	13	No. 5 Auburn	7	Miami, FL	Miami Orange Bowl	72,647
5	Jan. 1, 1965	Cotton	No. 2 Arkansas	10	No. 6 Nebraska	7	Dallas, TX	Cotton Bowl	75,504
6	Jan. 1, 1966	Orange	No. 4 Alabama	39	No. 3 Nebraska	28	Miami, FL	Miami Orange Bowl	72,214
7	Jan. 2, 1967	Sugar	No. 3 Alabama	34	No. 6 Nebraska	7	New Orleans, LA	Tulane Stadium	82,000
8	Dec. 20, 1969	Sun	No. 14 Nebraska	45	Georgia	6	El Paso, TX	Sun Bowl	31,176
9	Jan. 1, 1971	Orange	No. 3 Nebraska	17	No. 5 LSU	12	Miami, FL	Miami Orange Bowl	80,699
10	Jan. 1, 1972	Orange	No. 1 Nebraska	38	No. 2 Alabama	6	Miami, FL	Miami Orange Bowl	78,151
11	Jan. 1, 1973	Orange	No. 9 Nebraska	40	No. 12 Notre Dame	6	Miami, FL	Miami Orange Bowl	80,010
12	Jan. 1, 1974	Cotton	No. 12 Nebraska	19	No. 8 Texas	3	Dallas, TX	Cotton Bowl	68,500
13	Dec. 31, 1974	Sugar	No. 8 Nebraska	13	No. 18 Florida	10	New Orleans, LA	Tulane Stadium	67,890
14	Dec. 26, 1975	Fiesta	No. 7 Arizona State	17	No. 6 Nebraska	14	Tempe, AZ	Sun Devil Stadium	51,396
15	Dec. 31, 1976	Bluebonnet	No. 13 Nebraska	27	No. 9 Texas Tech	24	Houston, TX	Astrodome	48,618
16	Dec. 19, 1977	Liberty	No. 12 Nebraska	21	No. 14 North Carolina	17	Memphis, TN	Liberty Bowl Memorial Stadium	49,456
17	Jan. 1, 1979	Orange	No. 4 Oklahoma	31	No. 6 Nebraska	24	Miami, FL	Miami Orange Bowl	66,365
18	Jan. 1, 1980	Cotton	No. 8 Houston	17	No. 7 Nebraska	14	Dallas, TX	Cotton Bowl	72,032
19	Dec. 27, 1980	Sun	No. 8 Nebraska	31	No. 17 Mississippi State	17	El Paso, TX	Sun Bowl	34,723
20	Jan. 1, 1982	Orange	No. 1 Clemson	22	No. 4 Nebraska	15	Miami, FL	Miami Orange Bowl	72,748
21	Jan. 1, 1983	Orange	No. 3 Nebraska	21	No. 13 LSU	20	Miami, FL	Miami Orange Bowl	54,407
22	Jan. 2, 1984	Orange	No. 5 Miami (FL)	31	No. 1 Nebraska	30	Miami, FL	Miami Orange Bowl	72,549
23	Jan. 1, 1985	Sugar	No. 5 Nebraska	28	No. 11 LSU	10	New Orleans, LA	Louisiana Superdome	75,608
24	Jan. 1, 1986	Fiesta	No. 5 Michigan	27	No. 7 Nebraska	23	Tempe, AZ	Sun Devil Stadium	72,454
25	Jan. 1, 1987	Sugar	No. 6 Nebraska	30	No. 5 LSU	15	New Orleans, LA	Louisiana Superdome	76,234
26	Jan. 1, 1988	Fiesta	No. 3 Florida State	31	No. 5 Nebraska	28	Tempe, AZ	Sun Devil Stadium	72,112
27	Jan. 2, 1989	Orange	No. 2 Miami (FL)	23	No. 6 Nebraska	3	Miami, FL	Miami Orange Bowl	79,480
28	Jan. 1, 1990	Fiesta	No. 5 Florida State	41	No. 6 Nebraska	17	Tempe, AZ	Sun Devil Stadium	73,953
29	Jan. 1, 1991	Citrus	No. 2 Georgia Tech	45	No. 19 Nebraska	21	Orlando, FL	Florida Citrus Bowl	73,328
30	Jan. 1, 1992	Orange	No. 1 Miami (FL)	22	No. 11 Nebraska	0	Miami, FL	Miami Orange Bowl	77,747
31	Jan. 1, 1993	Orange	No. 3 Florida State	27	No. 11 Nebraska	14	Miami, FL	Miami Orange Bowl	57,324
32	Jan. 1, 1994	Orange	No. 1 Florida State	18	No. 2 Nebraska	16	Miami, FL	Miami Orange Bowl	81,536
33	Jan. 1, 1995	Orange	No. 1 Nebraska	24	No. 3 Miami (FL)	17	Miami, FL	Miami Orange Bowl	81,753
34	Jan. 2, 1996	Fiesta	No. 1 Nebraska	62	No. 2 Florida	24	Tempe, AZ	Sun Devil Stadium	79,864
35	Dec. 31, 1996	Orange	No. 6 Nebraska	41	No. 10 Virginia Tech	21	Miami Gardens, FL	Joe Robbie Stadium	51,212
36	Jan. 2, 1998	Orange	No. 2 Nebraska	42	No. 3 Tennessee	17	Miami Gardens, FL	Joe Robbie Stadium	74,002
37	Dec. 30, 1998	Holiday	No. 5 Arizona	23	No. 14 Nebraska	20	San Diego, CA	Qualcomm Stadium	65,354
38	Jan. 2, 2000	Fiesta	No. 3 Nebraska	31	No. 6 Tennessee	21	Tempe, AZ	Sun Devil Stadium	71,526
39	Dec. 30, 2000	Alamo	No. 9 Nebraska	66	No. 18 Northwestern	17	San Antonio, TX	Alamodome	60,028
40	Jan. 3, 2002	Rose	No. 1 Miami (FL)	37	No. 4 Nebraska	14	Pasadena, CA	Rose Bowl	93,781
41	Dec. 27, 2002	Independence	Mississippi	27	Nebraska	23	Shreveport, LA	Independence Stadium	46,096
42	Dec. 29, 2003	Alamo	No. 22 Nebraska	17	Michigan State	3	San Antonio, TX	Alamodome	56,229
43	Dec. 28, 2005	Alamo	Nebraska	32	No. 20 Michigan	28	San Antonio, TX	Alamodome	63,016
44	Jan. 1, 2007	Cotton	No. 10 Auburn	17	No. 22 Nebraska	14	Dallas, TX	Cotton Bowl	66,777
45	Jan. 1, 2009	Gator	Nebraska	26	Clemson	21	Jacksonville, FL	EverBank Stadium	67,282
46	Dec. 30, 2009	Holiday	No. 20 Nebraska	33	No. 22 Arizona	0	San Diego, CA	Qualcomm Stadium	64,607
47	Dec. 30, 2010	Holiday	Washington	19	No. 17 Nebraska	7	San Diego, CA	Qualcomm Stadium	57,921
48	Jan. 2, 2012	Citrus	No. 10 South Carolina	30	No. 21 Nebraska	13	Orlando, FL	Florida Citrus Bowl	61,351
49	Jan. 1, 2013	Citrus	No. 6 Georgia	45	No. 23 Nebraska	31	Orlando, FL	Florida Citrus Bowl	59,712
50	Jan. 1, 2014	Gator	Nebraska	24	No. 23 Georgia	19	Jacksonville, FL	EverBank Stadium	60,712
51	Dec. 27, 2014	Holiday	No. 24 USC	45	No. 25 Nebraska	42	San Diego, CA	Qualcomm Stadium	55,789
52	Dec. 26, 2015	Foster Farms	Nebraska	37	UCLA	29	Santa Clara, CA	Levi's Stadium	33,527
53	Dec. 30, 2016	Music City	Tennessee	38	No. 24 Nebraska	24	Nashville, TN	Nissan Stadium	68,496
54	Dec. 28, 2024	Pinstripe	Nebraska	20	Boston College	15	New York, NY	Yankee Stadium	30,062
55	Dec. 31, 2025	Las Vegas	No. 15 Utah	44	Nebraska	22	Paradise, NV	Allegiant Stadium	38,879

== Record breakdown ==
=== Opponent ===
No.	Opponent	Record
6	Miami (FL)	2–4
4	LSU	4–0
4	Florida State	0–4
3	Georgia	2–1
3	Tennessee	2–1
3	Alabama	1–2
2	Florida	2–0
2	Arizona	1–1
2	Auburn	1–1
2	Clemson	1–1
2	Michigan	1–1
1	Boston College	1–0
1	Michigan State	1–0
1	Mississippi State	1–0
1	North Carolina	1–0
1	Northwestern	1–0
1	Texas	1–0
1	Texas Tech	1–0
1	UCLA	1–0
1	Virginia Tech	1–0
1	Arizona State	0–1
1	Arkansas	0–1
1	Georgia Tech	0–1
1	Houston	0–1
1	Oklahoma	0–1
1	Ole Miss	0–1
1	South Carolina	0–1
1	USC	0–1
1	Utah	0–1
1	Washington	0–1

=== Bowl ===
App.	Bowl	Record
17	Orange	8–9
6	Fiesta	2–4
4	Sugar	3–1
4	Cotton	1–3
4	Holiday	1–3
3	Alamo	3–0
3	Citrus	0–3
2	Gator	2–0
2	Sun	2–0
2	Rose	0–2
1	Bluebonnet	1–0
1	Gotham	1–0
1	Liberty	1–0
1	Pinstripe	1–0
1	San Francisco	1–0
1	Independence	0–1
1	Las Vegas	0–1
1	Music City	0–1

=== Coach ===
No.	Coach	Tenure	Record
25	Tom Osborne	1973–1997	12–13 (.480)
9	Bob Devaney	1962–1972	6–3 (.667)
7	Bo Pelini (Note: Bo Pelini served as interim head coach for the 2003 Alamo Bowl.)	2003, 2008–2014	4–3 (.571)
5	Frank Solich	1998–2003	2–3 (.400)
2	Bill Callahan	2004–2007	1–1 (.500)
2	Matt Rhule	2023-present	1–1 (.500)
2	Mike Riley	2015–2017	1–1 (.500)
1	Biff Jones	1937–1941	0–1 (.000)
1	Bill Glassford	1949–1955	0–1 (.000)
1	Barney Cotton (Note: Barney Cotton served as interim coach for the 2014 Holiday Bowl.)	2014	0–1 (.000)
