= Bob Brown (offensive lineman) =

American football player (1941–2023)

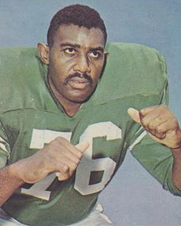

No. 76
- Position: Offensive tackle

Personal information
- Born: December 8, 1941; Cleveland, Ohio, U.S.
- Died: June 16, 2023 (aged 81); Oakland, California, U.S.
- Listed height: 6 ft 4 in (1.93 m)
- Listed weight: 280 lb (127 kg)

Career information
- High school: East Tech (Cleveland)
- College: Nebraska (1961–1963)
- NFL draft: 1964: 1st round, 2nd overall pick
- AFL draft: 1964: 1st round, 4th overall pick

Career history
- Philadelphia Eagles (1964–1968); Los Angeles Rams (1969–1970); Oakland Raiders (1971–1973)

Awards and highlights
- 5× First-team All-Pro (1965, 1966, 1968–1970); 4× Second-team All-Pro (1964, 1967, 1971, 1972); 6× Pro Bowl (1965, 1966, 1968–1971); NFL 1960s All-Decade Team; Philadelphia Eagles Hall of Fame; Unanimous All-American (1963); 2× First-team All-Big Eight (1963, 1964); Nebraska Cornhuskers No. 64 retired

Career NFL statistics
- Games played: 126
- Games started: 124
- Fumble recoveries: 2
- Stats at Pro Football Reference
- Pro Football Hall of Fame
- College Football Hall of Fame

Robert Stanford Brown (December 8, 1941 – June 16, 2023), nicknamed "the Boomer", was an American professional football offensive tackle who played in the National Football League (NFL) from 1964 through 1973. He played college football for the Nebraska Cornhuskers, earning unanimous All-American honors as a guard his senior year (1963). Brown was selected by the Philadelphia Eagles as the second overall pick in the 1964 NFL draft. A six-time Pro Bowl selection, he played for the Eagles from 1964 to 1968, the Los Angeles Rams from 1969 to 1970, and the Oakland Raiders from 1971 to 1973.

Brown was inducted into the College Football Hall of Fame in 1993 and the Pro Football Hall of Fame in 2004. He was named to the NFL 1960s All-Decade Team. Brown was a three-time offensive lineman of the year, a first-team All-Pro seven times, and second-team All-Pro in two other seasons. He was also inducted into the Philadelphia Eagles Hall of Fame in 2004.

== Early life ==
Brown was born on December 8, 1941, in Cleveland, where he later attended East Technical High School. He was on the football and track teams for three years. Brown was an overweight 280 pounds (127 kg) when he entered high school, and his older brother Ulysses got Brown into shape, enabling him to play football.

== College career ==
Brown attended the University of Nebraska, along with Ulysses, and both were teammates on the Cornhuskers' football team; playing in the Big Eight Conference. He was a two-way player at guard and outside linebacker. As a sophomore in 1961, the 6 ft 4.5 in (1.94 m) 251 lb (113.9 kg) Brown was a backup as an offensive lineman and outside linebacker in Bill Jennings' final season as the Cornhuskers' head coach. Jennings had recruited Brown to Nebraska.

Brown became a starter in 1962 under new Cornhuskers' coach Bob Devaney. Although remembered primarily for his play on offense at guard, Brown was also a dominant outside linebacker on defense. Brown preserved a 36–34 win in the 1962 Gotham Bowl, the program's first bowl win, with an interception in the final minute. The Associated Press (AP) named Brown honorable mention All-Big Eight at offensive guard in 1962. United Press International (UPI) named Brown second-team All-Big Eight at guard in 1962.

As a senior in 1963, Brown weighed 280 lb (127 kg) and was considered unusually large for this era of college football; but he also had unusual speed, quickness, agility for his size, both on offense and defense. Brown was a unanimous All-American selection at guard, helping Nebraska win their first Big Eight Conference championship since 1940. The Associated Press described Brown as spearheading the Cornhuskers in gaining the Big Eight title. He also helped Nebraska beat Auburn 13–7 in the 1964 Orange Bowl (played on January 1, 1964), throwing a key block that allowed teammate Dennis Claridge to run 68 yards for a touchdown. The Cornhuskers finished the season 10–1, and were ranked No. 6 nationally in the final Associated Press poll.

Brown was the Cornhuskers' first Black All-American. In 1963, he was voted the Offensive Lineman of the Year by the Washington D.C. Touchdown Club. Brown was selected first-team All-Big Eight by United Press International and the Associated Press in 1963.

== Professional career ==
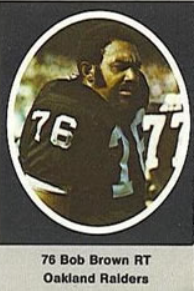
1972 Sunoco Stamp of Brown for Oakland Raiders

=== Philadelphia Eagles ===
Brown was selected in the first round of the 1964 NFL draft by the Philadelphia Eagles with the second overall pick. The Denver Broncos selected Brown with the fourth pick in the first round of the 1964 American Football League (AFL) draft. Eagles' general manager Vince McNally persistently pursued Brown in getting Brown to choose the Eagles over the Broncos, and the Eagles further offered Brown a $100,000 signing bonus. Brown chose the NFL and the Eagles.

During his five years with the Eagles' (1964 to 1968), Brown played under head coach Joe Kuharich and offensive line coach Dick Stanfel (a member of the NFL 1950s All-Decade Team at guard and 2016 Pro Football Hall of Fame inductee). In Brown's 2004 Hall of Fame induction speech, he described Kuharich as being like a second father to him; and Stanfel as being a genius offensive line tactician who was key in developing Brown's mental attitude and technique as an offensive lineman in the NFL; adding that "Stanfel taught me how to take the talents that I brought to the Eagles and forged it into a workable tool that ultimately placed me here today".

Brown reportedly was 6 ft 4.5 in (1.94 m) 280 lb (127 kg) when he came into the Eagles' 1964 training camp, though his weight would near 300 lb (136 kg) during his Eagle career; weight he carried as muscle, not flab. Brown started all 14 Eagles' games in 1964 at right tackle. After his rookie season in 1964, Brown was named to the NFL All-Rookie team and earned second-team All-Pro honors from the Associated Press. He started all 14 games at right tackle in 1965 and 1966 as well. Brown was named to the Pro Bowl in 1965 and 1966. In 1965, he was selected first-team All-Pro by the Associated Press and Newspaper Enterprise Association (NEA). The following season, he was named first-team All-Pro by the AP, NEA, UPI, and Pro Football Writers of America.

Brown played in 50 consecutive games from his rookie year into the eighth game of the 1967 season, against the expansion New Orleans Saints (the first win in Saints team history). Brown suffered a torn tendon in his right knee during the game that required surgery and ended his season. The injury would bother Brown for the rest of his career. Even though he only played in eight of 14 games that season, the AP and UPI named Brown second-team All Pro.

After his surgery and month-long hospital stay, Brown's weight fell from the 300 pound range to 231 pounds. He worked four hours every day on re-conditioning himself to regain his All-Pro form, as he had a fear of becoming an ordinary player. Brown came back and regained his form in 1968, though the Eagles had a 2–12 record and were the first team in Eagles' franchise history to lose 12 games in a single season. Brown started all 14 games at right tackle, was selected to the Pro Bowl, and was named first-team All-Pro by the AP, NEA and Pro Football Weekly; and second-team All-Pro by UPI.

During his five years with the Eagles, Brown was first or second-team All-Pro every year; and was selected to the Pro Bowl three times. Before the 1966 season, Eagles' coach Joe Kuharich stated that he believed Brown was the best offensive tackle in the NFL; a statement that encompassed future Hall of Fame tackles Forrest Gregg and Jim Parker. Kuharich observed that Brown's speed, mobility, and power made him peerless in leading outside running plays. By at least 1968, he was considered by many to be the best offensive tackle in the NFL.

In mid-May of 1969, Brown demanded that new Eagles' general manager Pete Retzlaff trade him, and Retzlaff effected a trade before the day was out. Retzlaff and Brown were Eagles' teammates from 1964 to 1966. Brown did not say at the time why he wanted the trade, stating "'I don't want any mudslinging attached to this announcement. I don't want to create a hullabaloo'".

In early May of 1969, the Eagles had been purchased by Leonard Tose, and among his first acts as owner was firing Joe Kuharich (who was both coach and general manager) and Dick Stanfel; appointing Retzlaff general manager a few days later. At the time Brown demanded a trade in May of 1969, he did expressly state to the media that both Kuharich and Stanfel gave him "great coaching" and "admirable friendship". Years later, Brown made clear that Tose's firing Kuharich and Stanfel was the reason why he had demanded an immediate trade from the Eagles. Brown later said that Kuharich was a great coach, and that the Eagles' failure as a team in 1968 was the result of some Eagles players not playing as well as they should have played; for which Kuharich was unfairly blamed.

=== Los Angeles Rams ===
After asking for a trade from the Eagles, Brown was sent to the Los Angeles Rams in a five-player exchange on May 12, 1969. The Eagles traded Brown, along with cornerback Jim Nettles, to the Rams in exchange for offensive tackle Joe Carollo, guard Don Chuy, and defensive back Irv Cross. Ram's future Hall of fame head coach George Allen called Brown "the finest offensive lineman in pro football". Brown started all 14 games for the Rams at right tackle in 1969. As in Philadelphia, he was selected to play in the Pro Bowl, and was named first-team All-Pro by the AP, NEA, Pro Football Weekly, and UPI. He was also named first-team All-NFL/AFL by the Pro Football Writers, the Hall of Fame, the NEA, and Pro Football Weekly.

In a SPORT magazine poll of over 1,000 players before the 1970 season, Brown was selected as the National Football Conference's top offensive lineman. In 1970, Brown again started all 14 games for the Rams. He was once more selected to play in the Pro Bowl, and was named first-team All-Pro by the AP, Pro Football Writers, NEA, and Pro Football Weekly.

=== Oakland Raiders ===
Brown was traded by the Rams to the Oakland Raiders, along with two draft picks, in exchange for offensive tackle Harry Schuh and cornerback Kent McCloughan on June 23, 1971. McCloughan had been Brown's teammate at Nebraska. Brown believed he was traded because the Rams did not want to pay him the salary he thought due in light of the high caliber of his play; and that some started labeling him a "troublemaker" because of his salary demands. In response to the troublemaker talk, Brown stated at the time "'It's money I guess. If you speak up for your rights you're a troublemaker, and if you're a black athlete who speaks up, you're really bad. You get that reputation and it sticks with you wherever you go'".

Before the start of the 1971 season, Raiders' future Hall of Fame coach John Madden called Brown "probably the best tackle in football". In 1971, Brown injured his knee during the preseason, and missed some preseason games. He played in the Raiders' first seven games of the regular season, but reinjured his knee in a game against the Kansas City Chiefs, suffering cartilage damage. Brown had surgery, and missed four games; returning to play in the season's 12th game. He was selected to play for the American Football Conference in the Pro Bowl; and was named first-team All-Pro by the NEA, second-team All-Pro by the Pro Football Writers, first-team All-AFC by the AP and The Sporting News, and second-team All-AFC by UPI.

Brown came back in 1972 to start all 14 Raiders' games. Pro Football Weekly and the Pro Football Writers named Brown first-team All-Pro and the AP named him second-team All-Pro. The AP, Pro Football Weekly, The Sporting News, and UPI named him first-team All-AFC. Brown played his last NFL season in 1973 with the Raiders. He started only eight games that season; suffering from problems with nerve damage in his leg. The Raiders waived Brown before the start of the 1974 season.

During his three seasons with the Raiders, Brown played on the offensive line with fellow future Pro Football Hall of Famers Art Shell, Gene Upshaw, and Jim Otto. During the 1971 season, another eventual Hall of Famer, Ron Mix, played his final pro season as Brown's backup at right tackle. Among all the great offensive lineman that played for those Oakland Raiders teams, Hall of Fame Kansas City Chief middle linebacker Willie Lanier had particular respect for Brown.

== Legacy and honors ==
In 1993, Brown was inducted into the College Football Hall of Fame. A member of the NFL 1960s All-Decade Team, he was inducted into the Pro Football Hall of Fame in 2004. He was also inducted into the Eagles Hall of Fame in 2004. Brown’s No. 64 was retired by the University of Nebraska–Lincoln in 2004. Brown was named a first-team All-Pro during seven of his ten NFL seasons, and second-team in two other seasons. He was named the NFL/NFC Offensive Lineman of the Year three times. Brown was also selected to the Pro Bowl six times: thrice with the Eagles, twice with the Rams, and once with the Raiders.

Brown was nicknamed "the Boomer" in the NFL. He had a reputation as the NFL's meanest lineman. Brown said his game was predicated on inflicting more pain on the defensive lineman than would be inflicted on him. "'The guy who wins is the one who inflicts more pain. I try to drive out his intestinal fortitude. Then he's mine'". Brown would physically beat on opposing lineman as the game progressed, so they were not "sure they want to keep coming" by the fourth quarter. When the head slap was still a legal maneuver for defensive lineman to use against offensive lineman, Brown would reverse the screws in his helmet, with the pointed ends facing out, and sharpen them. He was known for the exceptional force with which he delivered the "ripup" move, where an offensive lineman would drive his fists into the oncoming pass rushing defender's chest, with Brown sometimes lifting the defensive ends off their feet.

Stan Walters, who played offensive tackle from 1972 to 1983 for the Eagles (1975 to 1983) and the Cincinnati Bengals, considered Brown the greatest tackle he ever saw and studied game film of Brown. Walters' Cincinnati offensive line coach as a rookie, Bill "Tiger" Johnson, used Brown as the model for how to play tackle. Walters believed Brown never received full recognition as the greatest tackle because of Brown's temperament and that he never played on a championship team. Walters once asked defensive tackle Manny Sistrunk if he played against Brown, and said Sistrunk

told me that he played defensive tackle on Brown's side when he was a rookie . . . He said it was the first third-down passing situation of the game and the defense called for a stunt where the tackle loops around the defensive end and rushes from the outside. Manny said 'Stan I looped around and when I looked at Brown he was smiling at me, just smiling with those beady little eyes and that great big body. Then he hit me. He didn't just punch out at me, he hit me right over the head with his forearm, smashing my helmet down to my neck. Then he drove me into the ground. Stan, he was a mean man . . .'

Brown took great pride in being a top player at his position for both personal and financial reasons. He was one of the first NFL linemen to devote himself to year round weight training. After his 1967 injury, he said of regaining his All-Pro status "'I want it very badly. I must have it. I know this may sound cocky or corny or crass, but with my makeup I must have it'". He also saw football as a means to an end, and that the better he played the more financial security he would have; understanding that football had put him through four years of college and given him a lucrative professional career. Brown said that playing tackle in the NFL "'was a job and like any other job I was raised by a man who taught me that if you work for someone and you take their money, you give them an honest day's work . . . I never dogged a day. I ran the tank completely dry'".

== Personal life and death ==
Brown was married to Cecelia and had a son, Robert Jr. Robert Jr. was Brown's presenter at his Pro Football Hall of Fame induction ceremony in 2004. Pro Football Hall of Fame president Jim Porter issued a statement at the time of Brown's death. After describing Brown's fierce demeanor and play during games, Porter said that "'off the field, [Brown] demonstrated a quiet, soft-spoken and caring nature that his son, Robert Jr., captured eloquently when he presented his dad for enshrinement in 2004'".

Brown had a stroke in April 2023. Afterwards, he lived in a rehabilitation center in Oakland, California, where he died on June 16, 2023, at the age of 81.
