= 1964 Sugar Bowl =

American college football game

- 30th Sugar Bowl
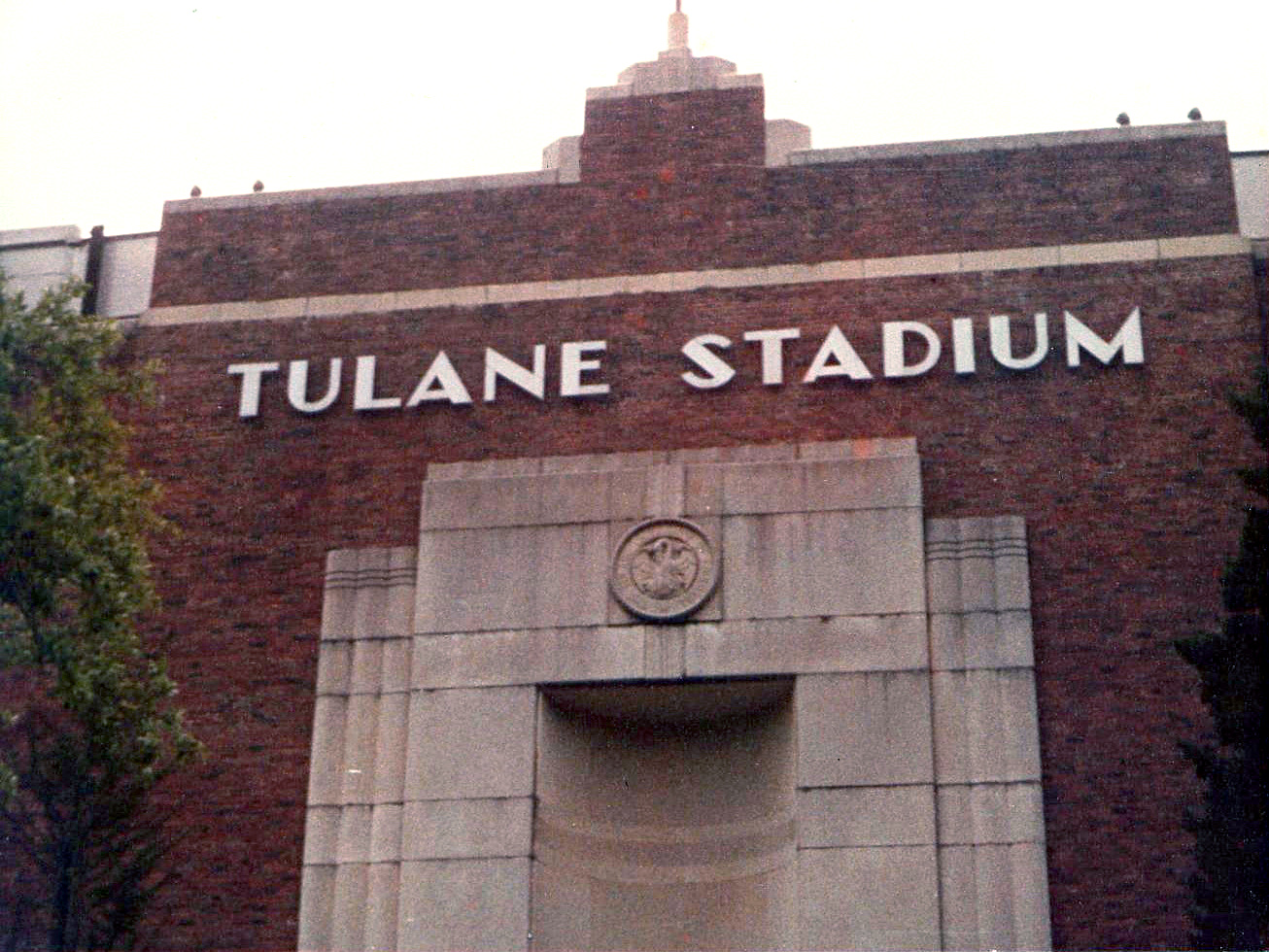
- Tulane Stadium in New Orleans, Louisiana, hosted the Sugar Bowl.
Alabama Crimson Tide	Ole Miss Rebels
(8–2)	(7–0–2)
SEC	SEC
12	7
Head coach: Bear Bryant	Head coach: Johnny Vaught
AP / Coaches; 8 / 9	AP / Coaches; 7 / 7
	1	2	3	4	Total
Alabama	3	6	3	0	12
Ole Miss	0	0	0	7	7
- Date: January 1, 1964
- Season: 1963
- Stadium: Tulane Stadium
- Location: New Orleans, Louisiana
- MVP: Tim Davis (Alabama PK)
- Favorite: Ole Miss by 7½ points
- Referee: E.D. Cavette (SEC)
- Attendance: 80,785

United States TV coverage
- Network: NBC
- Announcers: Ray Scott, Frankie Albert

The 1964 Sugar Bowl was the thirtieth edition of the college football bowl game, played at Tulane Stadium in New Orleans, Louisiana, on Wednesday, January 1. Part of the 1963–64 bowl game season, it matched the seventh-ranked Ole Miss Rebels and the #8 Alabama Crimson Tide, both of the Southeastern Conference (SEC), although the two teams had not met in years. This would mark the last Sugar Bowl with two SEC teams until 2026.

The matchup was the first between the flagship universities of these neighboring states in almost two decades (1944), and only the second in over thirty years. In a defensive struggle, Alabama upset the Rebels 12–7 without scoring a touchdown.

New Orleans received a rare substantial snowfall of 3.6 inches (9 cm) the previous day, and cleared snow lay in large banks around the edges of the field.

== Teams ==
=== Alabama ===
This was Bear Bryant's sixth season as head coach at Alabama. The Crimson Tide lost to Florida and long-time rival Auburn en route to an 8–2 regular season. Originally wanting to pit Navy against Ole Miss, the Sugar Bowl extended the invitation to Alabama with two weeks remaining in the regular season. This was their seventeenth bowl appearance and the fourth in the Sugar Bowl.

On December 9, several days prior to the regular season finale against Miami, junior quarterback Joe Namath was suspended for the remainder of the season by Bryant. Sophomore Steve Sloan started at quarterback for the Crimson Tide in the final two games.

=== Mississippi ===
The 1963 squad was Johnny Vaught's seventeenth as head coach at Ole Miss. The Rebels did not lose a regular season game, but tied Memphis State and long-time rival Mississippi State en route to a 7–0–2 record. This was their twelfth bowl appearance and the seventh in the Sugar Bowl.

== Game summary ==
The Sugar Bowl kicked off at 1 pm CST, as did the Cotton and Orange Bowls. The temperature was 40 °F (4 °C).

The game was a defensive slugfest. The teams combined for 17 fumbles, 11 by the Rebels, both all-time bowl game records. There was also a total of thirteen combined turnovers and nine punts. Alabama scored its first points on a 31-yard field goal by Tim Davis. In the second quarter, Davis kicked field goals of 46 and 22-yards to give Alabama a 9–0 lead at halftime.

In the third quarter, Davis had a 48-yard field goal to extend the Alabama lead to 12–0. Early in the fourth quarter, Ole Miss scored the only touchdown of the game when Perry Lee Dunn threw a five-yard touchdown pass to Larry Smith. Alabama then held their lead and won the game 12–7. For his four field goal performance, Tim Davis was named the Sugar Bowl MVP.

=== Scoring ===
Scoring summary

Quarter	Time	Drive			Team	Scoring information	Score	
Quarter	Time	Plays	Yards	TOP	Team	Scoring information	Alabama	Ole Miss
1	1:16		71		Alabama	31-yard field goal by Tim Davis	3	0
2	13:57	4	1		Alabama	46-yard field goal by Davis	6	0
2	0:13				Alabama	22-yard field goal by Davis	9	0
3	1:18				Alabama	48-yard field goal by Davis	12	0
4	11:57	10	74		Ole Miss	Larry Smith 5-yard touchdown reception from Perry Lee Dunn, Billy Irwin kick good	12	7
"TOP" = time of possession. For other American football terms, see Glossary of American football.							12	7

== Statistics ==
Statistics	Alabama	Ole Miss
First downs	14	9
Rushing	58–165	27–77
Passing	3–11–1	11–21–3
Passing yards	29	171
Total offense	69–194	48–248
Punts–avg.	5–36.8	4–44.0
Fumbles–lost	6–3	11–6
Turnovers	4	9
Penalties–yards	3–15	5–45

== See also ==
- Alabama–Ole Miss football rivalry
