= 1963 Georgia Bulldogs football team =

American college football season

1963 Georgia Bulldogs football
- Conference: Southeastern Conference
- Record: 4–5–1 (2–4 SEC)
- Head coach: Johnny Griffith (3rd season)
- Home stadium: Sanford Stadium

1963 Southeastern Conference football standings
	Conf.					Overall
Team	W		L		T	W		L		T
No. 7 Ole Miss $	5	–	0	–	1	7	–	1	–	2
No. 5 Auburn	6	–	1	–	0	9	–	2	–	0
No. 8 Alabama	6	–	2	–	0	9	–	2	–	0
Mississippi State	4	–	1	–	2	7	–	2	–	2
LSU	4	–	2	–	0	7	–	4	–	0
Georgia Tech	4	–	3	–	0	7	–	3	–	0
Florida	3	–	3	–	1	6	–	3	–	1
Tennessee	3	–	5	–	0	5	–	5	–	0
Georgia	2	–	4	–	0	4	–	5	–	1
Vanderbilt	0	–	5	–	2	1	–	7	–	2
Kentucky	0	–	5	–	1	3	–	6	–	1
Tulane	0	–	6	–	1	1	–	8	–	1
$ – Conference champion; Rankings from AP Poll

The 1963 Georgia Bulldogs football team represented the University of Georgia as a member of the Southeastern Conference (SEC) during the 1963 NCAA University Division football season. Led by third-year head coach Johnny Griffith, the Bulldogs compiled an overall record of 4–5–1 with a mark of 2–4 in conference play, and finished ninth in the SEC.

== Schedule ==
Date	Opponent	Site	Result	Attendance	Source
September 21	No. 3 Alabama	Sanford Stadium; Athens, GA (rivalry)	L 7–32	34,980	
September 28	Vanderbilt	Sanford Stadium; Athens, GA (rivalry)	W 20–0	17,000	
October 5	South Carolina*	Sanford Stadium; Athens, GA (rivalry)	W 27–7	33,500	
October 12	at Clemson*	Memorial Stadium; Clemson, SC (rivalry)	T 7–7	24,000	
October 18	at Miami (FL)*	Miami Orange Bowl; Miami, FL	W 31–14	44,895–45,895	
October 26	at Kentucky	McLean Stadium; Lexington, KY	W 17–14	30,000	
November 2	at North Carolina*	Kenan Memorial Stadium; Chapel Hill, NC	L 7–28	34,000	
November 9	vs. Florida	Gator Bowl Stadium; Jacksonville, FL (rivalry)	L 14–21	48,235	
November 16	No. 9 Auburn^{†}	Sanford Stadium; Athens, GA (rivalry)	L 0–14	50,000	
November 28	at Georgia Tech	Grant Field; Atlanta, GA (rivalry)	L 3–14	53,052	
*Non-conference game; ^{†}Homecoming; Rankings from AP Poll released prior to the game
