= 1963 Tulane Green Wave football team =

American college football season

1963 Tulane Green Wave football
- Conference: Southeastern Conference
- Record: 1–8–1 (0–6–1 SEC)
- Head coach: Tommy O'Boyle (2nd season)
- Home stadium: Tulane Stadium

1963 Southeastern Conference football standings
	Conf.					Overall
Team	W		L		T	W		L		T
No. 7 Ole Miss $	5	–	0	–	1	7	–	1	–	2
No. 5 Auburn	6	–	1	–	0	9	–	2	–	0
No. 8 Alabama	6	–	2	–	0	9	–	2	–	0
Mississippi State	4	–	1	–	2	7	–	2	–	2
LSU	4	–	2	–	0	7	–	4	–	0
Georgia Tech	4	–	3	–	0	7	–	3	–	0
Florida	3	–	3	–	1	6	–	3	–	1
Tennessee	3	–	5	–	0	5	–	5	–	0
Georgia	2	–	4	–	0	4	–	5	–	1
Vanderbilt	0	–	5	–	2	1	–	7	–	2
Kentucky	0	–	5	–	1	3	–	6	–	1
Tulane	0	–	6	–	1	1	–	8	–	1
$ – Conference champion; Rankings from AP Poll

The 1963 Tulane Green Wave football team was an American football team that represented Tulane University during the 1963 NCAA University Division football season as a member of the Southeastern Conference (SEC). In its second year under head coach Tommy O'Boyle, Tulane compiled a 1–8–1 record (0–6–1 in conference games), finished in last place in the SEC, and was outscored by a total of 191 to 43.

The team gained an average of 89.2 rushing yards and 67.8 passing yards per game. On defense, it gave up an average of 212.7 rushing yards and 95.8 passing yards per game. Tulane's individual leaders included Al Burguieres with 664 passing yards, George Smith with 217 rushing yards, and Ron Chapoton with 130 receiving yards.

The Green Wave played its home games at Tulane Stadium in New Orleans.

== Schedule ==
Date	Opponent	Site	Result	Attendance	Source
September 20	No. 5 Texas*	Tulane Stadium; New Orleans, LA	L 0–21	18,000	
September 28	vs. No. 2 Alabama	Ladd Memorial Stadium; Mobile, AL	L 0–28	30,102	
October 4	Miami (FL)*	Tulane Stadium; New Orleans, LA	L 0–10	18,000	
October 12	at Mississippi State	Mississippi Veterans Memorial Stadium; Jackson, MS	L 10–31	20,000	
October 19	No. 5 Ole Miss	Tulane Stadium; New Orleans, LA (rivalry)	L 0–21	17,000	
October 26	Georgia Tech	Tulane Stadium; New Orleans, LA	L 3–17	15,000	
November 2	at South Carolina*	Carolina Stadium; Columbia, SC	W 20–7	18,372	
November 9	Tennessee	Tulane Stadium; New Orleans, LA	L 0–26	10,000	
November 16	Vanderbilt	Tulane Stadium; New Orleans, LA	T 10–10	15,000	
November 23	at LSU	Tiger Stadium; Baton, Rouge, LA (Battle for the Rag)	L 0–20	55,000	
*Non-conference game; Rankings from AP Poll released prior to the game
