= 1963 LSU Tigers football team =

American college football season

1963 LSU Tigers football

Bluebonnet Bowl, L 14–7 vs. Baylor
- Conference: Southeastern Conference
- Record: 7–4 (4–2 SEC)
- Head coach: Charles McClendon (2nd season)
- Home stadium: Tiger Stadium

1963 Southeastern Conference football standings
	Conf.					Overall
Team	W		L		T	W		L		T
No. 7 Ole Miss $	5	–	0	–	1	7	–	1	–	2
No. 5 Auburn	6	–	1	–	0	9	–	2	–	0
No. 8 Alabama	6	–	2	–	0	9	–	2	–	0
Mississippi State	4	–	1	–	2	7	–	2	–	2
LSU	4	–	2	–	0	7	–	4	–	0
Georgia Tech	4	–	3	–	0	7	–	3	–	0
Florida	3	–	3	–	1	6	–	3	–	1
Tennessee	3	–	5	–	0	5	–	5	–	0
Georgia	2	–	4	–	0	4	–	5	–	1
Vanderbilt	0	–	5	–	2	1	–	7	–	2
Kentucky	0	–	5	–	1	3	–	6	–	1
Tulane	0	–	6	–	1	1	–	8	–	1
$ – Conference champion; Rankings from AP Poll

The 1963 LSU Tigers football team was an American football team that represented Louisiana State University (LSU) as a member of the Southeastern Conference (SEC) during the 1963 NCAA University Division football season. In their second year under head coach Charles McClendon, the Tigers compiled an overall record of 7–4, with a conference record of 4–2, and finished fifth in the SEC.

The Battle for the Rag, the annual rivalry game vs. Tulane, was played as scheduled, one of the few games not to be postponed or canceled following the assassination of President John F. Kennedy. The contest kicked off approximately 25 hours after the tragedy in Dallas. It was the second of three consecutive Tiger shutouts vs. the Green Wave at Baton Rouge.

As of 2025, this is the last season in which LSU did not play Alabama. It was also the last time LSU played Georgia Tech in the regular season; the Yellow Jackets left the SEC on July 1, 1964.

== Schedule ==
Date	Time	Opponent	Site	TV	Result	Attendance	Source
September 21	8:00 p.m.	Texas A&M*	Tiger Stadium; Baton Rouge, LA (rivalry)		W 14–6	68,000	
September 28		at Rice*	Rice Stadium; Houston, TX		L 12–21	64,000	
October 5	8:00 p.m.	No. 7 Georgia Tech	Tiger Stadium; Baton Rouge, LA		W 7–6	67,500	
October 11		at Miami (FL)*	Miami Orange Bowl; Miami, FL		W 3–0	45,986	
October 19	8:00 p.m.	Kentucky^{†}	Tiger Stadium; Baton Rouge, LA		W 28–7	68,000	
October 26		at Florida	Florida Field; Gainesville, FL (rivalry)		W 14–0	46,000	
November 2		No. 3 Ole Miss	Tiger Stadium; Baton Rouge, LA (rivalry)	CBS	L 3–37	67,500	
November 9	8:00 p.m.	TCU*	Tiger Stadium; Baton Rouge, LA		W 28–14	67,000	
November 16		at Mississippi State	Mississippi Veterans Memorial Stadium; Jackson, MS (rivalry)		L 6–7	46,500	
November 23	2:00 p.m.	Tulane	Tiger Stadium; Baton Rouge, LA (Battle for the Rag)		W 20–0	55,000	
December 21		vs. Baylor*	Rice Stadium; Houston, TX (Bluebonnet Bowl)	CBS	L 7–14	50,000	
*Non-conference game; ^{†}Homecoming; Rankings from AP Poll released prior to the game; All times are in Central time
