= 1963 Tennessee Volunteers football team =

American college football season

1963 Tennessee Volunteers football
- Conference: Southeastern Conference
- Record: 5–5 (3–5 SEC)
- Head coach: Jim McDonald (1st season)
- Home stadium: Neyland Stadium

1963 Southeastern Conference football standings
	Conf.					Overall
Team	W		L		T	W		L		T
No. 7 Ole Miss $	5	–	0	–	1	7	–	1	–	2
No. 5 Auburn	6	–	1	–	0	9	–	2	–	0
No. 8 Alabama	6	–	2	–	0	9	–	2	–	0
Mississippi State	4	–	1	–	2	7	–	2	–	2
LSU	4	–	2	–	0	7	–	4	–	0
Georgia Tech	4	–	3	–	0	7	–	3	–	0
Florida	3	–	3	–	1	6	–	3	–	1
Tennessee	3	–	5	–	0	5	–	5	–	0
Georgia	2	–	4	–	0	4	–	5	–	1
Vanderbilt	0	–	5	–	2	1	–	7	–	2
Kentucky	0	–	5	–	1	3	–	6	–	1
Tulane	0	–	6	–	1	1	–	8	–	1
$ – Conference champion; Rankings from AP Poll

The 1963 Tennessee Volunteers football team (variously "Tennessee", "UT" or the "Vols") represented the University of Tennessee in the 1963 NCAA University Division football season. Playing as a member of the Southeastern Conference (SEC), the team was led by head coach Jim McDonald, in his first and only year, and played their home games at Neyland Stadium in Knoxville, Tennessee. They finished the season with a record of five wins and five losses (5–5 overall, 3–5 in the SEC).

The rivalry game against Kentucky was one of only 6 games not to be canceled or postponed due to the assassination of President John F. Kennedy the day before. It went ahead as scheduled.

== Schedule ==
Date	Opponent	Site	Result	Attendance	Source
September 21	Richmond*	Neyland Stadium; Knoxville, TN	W 34–6	24,842	
September 28	Auburn	Neyland Stadium; Knoxville, TN (rivalry)	L 19–23	35,000	
October 5	Mississippi State	Neyland Stadium; Knoxville, TN	L 0–7	24,500	
October 12	Georgia Tech^{†}	Neyland Stadium; Knoxville, TN (rivalry)	L 7–23	51,527	
October 19	at No. 9 Alabama	Legion Field; Birmingham, AL (Third Saturday in October)	L 0–35	53,454	
October 26	Chattanooga*	Neyland Stadium; Knoxville, TN	W 49–7	22,000	
November 9	at Tulane	Tulane Stadium; New Orleans, LA	W 26–0	10,000	
November 16	vs. No. 3 Ole Miss	Crump Stadium; Memphis, TN (rivalry)	L 0–20	27,022	
November 23	at Kentucky	McLean Stadium; Lexington, KY (rivalry)	W 19–0	35,000	
November 30	Vanderbilt	Neyland Stadium; Knoxville, TN (rivalry)	W 14–0	21,696	
*Non-conference game; ^{†}Homecoming; Rankings from AP Poll released prior to the game

== Team players drafted into the NFL ==
Player	Position	Round	Pick	NFL club
Dick Evey	Tackle	1	14	Chicago Bears
Bob Zvolerin	Tackle	12	158	Washington Redskins
Ed Beard	Tackle	14	183	San Francisco 49ers
