= 1963 Vanderbilt Commodores football team =

American college football season

1963 Vanderbilt Commodores football
- Conference: Southeastern Conference
- Record: 1–7–2 (0–5–2 SEC)
- Head coach: John Green (1st season)
- Home stadium: Dudley Field

1963 Southeastern Conference football standings
	Conf.					Overall
Team	W		L		T	W		L		T
No. 7 Ole Miss $	5	–	0	–	1	7	–	1	–	2
No. 5 Auburn	6	–	1	–	0	9	–	2	–	0
No. 8 Alabama	6	–	2	–	0	9	–	2	–	0
Mississippi State	4	–	1	–	2	7	–	2	–	2
LSU	4	–	2	–	0	7	–	4	–	0
Georgia Tech	4	–	3	–	0	7	–	3	–	0
Florida	3	–	3	–	1	6	–	3	–	1
Tennessee	3	–	5	–	0	5	–	5	–	0
Georgia	2	–	4	–	0	4	–	5	–	1
Vanderbilt	0	–	5	–	2	1	–	7	–	2
Kentucky	0	–	5	–	1	3	–	6	–	1
Tulane	0	–	6	–	1	1	–	8	–	1
$ – Conference champion; Rankings from AP Poll

The 1963 Vanderbilt Commodores football team represented Vanderbilt University in the 1963 NCAA University Division football season. The Commodores were led by head coach John Green in his first season and finished the season with a record of one win, seven losses and two ties (1–7–2 overall, 0–5–2 in the SEC).

== Schedule ==
Date	Opponent	Site	Result	Attendance	Source
September 21	Furman*	Dudley Field; Nashville, TN	L 13–14		
September 28	at Georgia	Sanford Stadium; Athens, GA (rivalry)	L 0–20	17,000	
October 5	No. 2 Alabama	Dudley Field; Nashville, TN	L 6–21	24,500	
October 19	Florida	Dudley Field; Nashville, TN	L 0–21	16,500	
October 26	at No. 5 Ole Miss	Hemingway Stadium; Oxford, MS (rivalry)	L 7–27	21,500	
November 2	at Boston College*	Alumni Stadium; Chestnut Hill, MA	L 6–19	17,700	
November 9	Kentucky	Dudley Field; Nashville, TN (rivalry)	T 0–0	18,623	
November 16	at Tulane	Tulane Stadium; New Orleans, LA	T 10–10	15,000	
November 23	George Washington*	Dudley Field; Nashville, TN	W 31–0	11,000	
November 30	at Tennessee	Neyland Stadium; Knoxville, TN (rivalry)	L 0–14	21,696	
*Non-conference game; Rankings from AP Poll released prior to the game
