= 1963 Kentucky Wildcats football team =

American college football season

1963 Kentucky Wildcats football
- Conference: Southeastern Conference
- Record: 3–6–1 (0–5–1 SEC)
- Head coach: Charlie Bradshaw (2nd season)
- Home stadium: McLean Stadium

1963 Southeastern Conference football standings
| | Conf. | | | | | Overall |
| Team | W | | L | | T | W | | L | | T |
|---|---|---|---|---|---|---|---|---|---|---|
| No. 7 Ole Miss $ | 5 | – | 0 | – | 1 | 7 | – | 1 | – | 2 |
| No. 5 Auburn | 6 | – | 1 | – | 0 | 9 | – | 2 | – | 0 |
| No. 8 Alabama | 6 | – | 2 | – | 0 | 9 | – | 2 | – | 0 |
| Mississippi State | 4 | – | 1 | – | 2 | 7 | – | 2 | – | 2 |
| LSU | 4 | – | 2 | – | 0 | 7 | – | 4 | – | 0 |
| Georgia Tech | 4 | – | 3 | – | 0 | 7 | – | 3 | – | 0 |
| Florida | 3 | – | 3 | – | 1 | 6 | – | 3 | – | 1 |
| Tennessee | 3 | – | 5 | – | 0 | 5 | – | 5 | – | 0 |
| Georgia | 2 | – | 4 | – | 0 | 4 | – | 5 | – | 1 |
| Vanderbilt | 0 | – | 5 | – | 2 | 1 | – | 7 | – | 2 |
| Kentucky | 0 | – | 5 | – | 1 | 3 | – | 6 | – | 1 |
| Tulane | 0 | – | 6 | – | 1 | 1 | – | 8 | – | 1 |
$ – Conference champion; Rankings from AP Poll

The 1963 Kentucky Wildcats football team were an American football team that represented the University of Kentucky as a member of the Southeastern Conference during the 1963 NCAA University Division football season. In their second season under head coach Charlie Bradshaw, the team compiled a 3–6–1 record (0–5–1 in the SEC).

== Schedule ==
| Date | Opponent | Site | Result | Attendance | Source |
|---|---|---|---|---|---|
| September 21 | Virginia Tech* | McLean Stadium; Lexington, KY | W 33–14 | 35,000 | |
| September 28 | No. 7 Ole Miss | McLean Stadium; Lexington, KY | L 7–31 | 37,500 | |
| October 5 | at Auburn | Cliff Hare Stadium; Auburn, AL | L 13–14 | 30,126 | |
| October 12 | Detroit* | McLean Stadium; Lexington, KY | W 35–18 | 26,000 | |
| October 19 | at LSU | Tiger Stadium; Baton Rouge, LA | L 7–28 | 68,000 | |
| October 26 | Georgia | McLean Stadium; Lexington, KY | L 14–17 | 30,000 | |
| November 2 | Miami (FL)* | McLean Stadium; Lexington, KY | L 14–20 | 27,500 | |
| November 9 | at Vanderbilt | Dudley Field; Nashville, TN (rivalry) | T 0–0 | 18,623 | |
| November 16 | at Baylor* | Baylor Stadium; Waco, TX | W 19–7 | 18,000 | |
| November 23 | Tennessee | McLean Stadium; Lexington, KY (rivalry) | L 0–19 | 35,000 | |
*Non-conference game; Rankings from AP Poll released prior to the game
