= Alabama–Ole Miss football rivalry =

American college football rivalry

- Alabama Crimson Tide Ole Miss Rebels
- First meeting: October 27, 1894; Ole Miss, 6–0
- Latest meeting: September 23, 2023; Alabama, 24–10
- Next meeting: 2027

Statistics
- Total meetings: 71
- All-time series: Alabama leads, 55–10–2
- Largest victory: Alabama, 64–0 (1917)
- Longest win streak: Alabama, 12 (1912–1932)
- Current win streak: Alabama, 8 (2016–present)

Locations of Alabama and Ole Miss

The Alabama–Ole Miss football rivalry is an American college football rivalry between the Alabama Crimson Tide and Ole Miss Rebels. They are charter members of the Southeastern Conference (SEC), and both have competed in the SEC West since 1992.

The rivalry dates back to 1894, when Ole Miss defeated Alabama in Jackson, Mississippi. Currently, Alabama leads Ole Miss 55–11–2. The most recent Ole Miss victory was in 2015. Until 2023, the rivalry had alternated between the two respective campuses. Contests in odd-numbered years were played in Tuscaloosa, Alabama, and even-numbered years in Oxford, Mississippi.

== Notable games ==
1964 Sugar Bowl: In the only meeting in series history played outside of Alabama or Mississippi, #8 Alabama upset #7 Ole Miss 12–7 behind four field goals by kicker Tim Davis. Played at the end of the 1963 season, this game is notable for being the coldest Sugar Bowl in history, as snow plows were used to clear the Tulane Stadium field prior to the game. It was the first meeting of the two programs since 1944, and junior quarterback Joe Namath did not play, as he was suspended on December 9 for the remainder of the season.

1969: In what is often erroneously referred to as the first prime time regular season football game in history, #20 Ole Miss traveled to Legion Field in Birmingham to face #15 Alabama. A dazzling offensive shootout ensues, highlighted by the play of Ole Miss quarterback Archie Manning. Despite a 540-yard, 5 touchdown effort from Manning, Alabama emerged victorious 33–32 after a last minute touchdown pass by quarterback Scott Hunter. The game has been referred to as among the greatest in college football history.

1988: Ole Miss stunned #12 Alabama 22–12 in Tuscaloosa, the Rebels' first-ever road victory in the series. This game is known as "The Brick Bowl", due to a claim made by then-Alabama head coach Bill Curry that a brick was thrown through his office's window following the loss.

1989: Following Ole Miss' upset victory the year before, the Rebels hopped out to a 21–0 lead over #13 Alabama in Jackson, MS. The Crimson Tide then scored 62 unanswered points en route to a 62–27 victory. The 21-point comeback still stands as the largest in Alabama football history.

1998: This was the first overtime game in series history, with Alabama emerging victorious 20–17. It was the first overtime win in Alabama football history, as well as the first overtime loss in Ole Miss football history.

2006: In 2006, Alabama beat the Rebels in an overtime thriller. In overtime, Ole Miss made a 37-yard field goal, but Alabama scored a touchdown on a pass to Le'Ron McClain to win the game 26–23.

2007: Alabama beat Ole Miss in Oxford by scoring 10 unanswered points to win the game 27–24, amidst controversial rulings from the officials. It was Alabama's fifth consecutive victory over the Rebels.

2014: In 2014, #1 Alabama came into Oxford as a 6-point favorite taking on #11 Ole Miss. Alabama led 14–3 at the half, but were held to only 3 points in the second half. Late in the fourth quarter, Ole Miss scored a go-ahead touchdown, but missed the PAT, leaving the score at 23–17. Alabama drove to Ole Miss 32 yard line, before Blake Sims threw an interception to Senquez Golson with 37 seconds left. This was Ole Miss' first victory over Alabama since 2003, snapping a 10-game losing streak in the series. Due to sanctions, this win was vacated in 2019 due to the use of ineligible players.

2015: #2 Alabama sought revenge for the previous season's defeat, but #15 Ole Miss shot out to a 30–10 lead late in the third quarter. Alabama quickly closed the gap to 30–24 less than three minutes into the fourth. Ole Miss then scored 13 unanswered to extend their lead to 43–24, but had to fight off another Crimson Tide rally to secure a 43–37 upset victory. Alabama committed 5 turnovers in this game, the most under head coach Nick Saban. It was the first time in school history that Ole Miss had beaten Alabama in consecutive seasons and just the second time that the Rebels had won in Tuscaloosa. This was the Crimson Tide's only loss that season; they went on to win the College Football Playoff national championship.

2016: #19 Ole Miss seemed to be on track for an unprecedented third-straight win over the top-ranked Crimson Tide, leading 24–3 with less than 2:47 left to play in the first half. Alabama then scored 24 unanswered points to take a 27–24 lead midway through the third quarter. Late in the fourth quarter, the Tide had extended its lead to 48–30 before Ole Miss scored twice in rapid succession to cut the deficit to five points with just under three minutes left. Alabama was able to run out the clock, preserving a wild 48–43 victory and ending the Rebels' school record two game winning streak in the series. The 21-point comeback tied the 1989 Alabama-Ole Miss game for the largest comeback in Alabama football history.

2020: Following three consecutive blowouts by the Crimson Tide, Ole Miss, under first-year head coach Lane Kiffin, sought to keep the game within reach. Both schools traded touchdowns throughout the first half and entered halftime tied at 21. Quarterbacks Matt Corral of the Rebels and Mac Jones of the Tide continued leading long scoring drives throughout the third quarter; no team led by more than a touchdown until late in the fourth, when a 14-yard touchdown run by wide receiver DeVonta Smith put Alabama up by 11. The Tide would hang on to win 63–48 in what became the highest-scoring game in the history of the rivalry.

== Game results ==
Alabama victories	Ole Miss victories	Tie games	Forfeits / Vacated wins

No.	Date	Location	Winning team		Losing team	
1	October 27, 1894	Jackson, MS	Ole Miss	6	Alabama	0
2	November 24, 1899	Jackson, MS	Alabama	7	Ole Miss	5
3	October 26, 1900	Tuscaloosa, AL	Alabama	12	Ole Miss	5
4	October 19, 1901	Tuscaloosa, AL	Alabama	41	Ole Miss	0
5	October 12, 1907	Columbus, MS	Alabama	20	Ole Miss	0
6	October 23, 1909	Jackson, MS	Tie	0	Tie	0
7	November 5, 1910	Greenville, MS	Ole Miss	16	Alabama	0
8	November 9, 1912	Tuscaloosa, AL	Alabama	10	Ole Miss	9
9	November 25, 1915	Birmingham, AL	Alabama	53	Ole Miss	0
10	October 28, 1916	Tuscaloosa, AL	Alabama	27	Ole Miss	0
11	October 27, 1917	Tuscaloosa, AL	Alabama	64	Ole Miss	0
12	October 11, 1919	Tuscaloosa, AL	Alabama	49	Ole Miss	0
13	October 6, 1923	Tuscaloosa, AL	Alabama	56	Ole Miss	0
14	November 1, 1924	Montgomery, AL	Alabama	61	Ole Miss	0
15	October 6, 1928	Tuscaloosa, AL	Alabama	27	Ole Miss	0
16	October 5, 1929	Tuscaloosa, AL	Alabama	22	Ole Miss	7
17	October 4, 1930	Tuscaloosa, AL	Alabama	64	Ole Miss	0
18	October 3, 1931	Tuscaloosa, AL	Alabama	55	Ole Miss	6
19	October 22, 1932	Tuscaloosa, AL	Alabama	24	Ole Miss	13
20	October 7, 1933	Birmingham, AL	Tie	0	Tie	0
21	November 11, 1944	Mobile, AL	Alabama	34	Ole Miss	6
22	January 1, 1964	New Orleans, LA	#8 Alabama	12	#7 Ole Miss	7
23	October 2, 1965	Birmingham, AL	Alabama	17	Ole Miss	16
24	October 1, 1966	Jackson, MS	#3 Alabama	17	Ole Miss	7
25	October 7, 1967	Birmingham, AL	#9 Alabama	21	Ole Miss	7
26	October 5, 1968	Jackson, MS	Ole Miss	10	#11 Alabama	8
27	October 4, 1969	Birmingham, AL	#15 Alabama	33	#20 Ole Miss	32
28	October 3, 1970	Jackson, MS	#7 Ole Miss	48	#17 Alabama	23
29	October 2, 1971	Birmingham, AL	#7 Alabama	40	Ole Miss	6
30	October 5, 1974	Jackson, MS	#3 Alabama	35	Ole Miss	21
31	October 4, 1975	Birmingham, AL	#9 Alabama	32	Ole Miss	6
32	September 11, 1976	Jackson, MS	Ole Miss	10	#6 Alabama	7
33	September 10, 1977	Birmingham, AL	#6 Alabama	34	Ole Miss	14
34	September 20, 1980	Jackson, MS	#1 Alabama	59	Ole Miss	35
35	October 3, 1981	Tuscaloosa, AL	#11 Alabama	38	Ole Miss	7
36	September 18, 1982	Jackson, MS	#4 Alabama	42	Ole Miss	14
37	September 17, 1983	Tuscaloosa, AL	#12 Alabama	40	Ole Miss	0

No.	Date	Location	Winning team		Losing team	
38	October 8, 1988	Tuscaloosa, AL	Ole Miss	22	#12 Alabama	12
39	October 7, 1989	Jackson, MS	#13 Alabama	62	Ole Miss	27
40	October 24, 1992	Tuscaloosa, AL	#4 Alabama	31	Ole Miss	10
41	October 23, 1993	Oxford, MS	#4 Alabama^{†}	19	Ole Miss	14
42	October 22, 1994	Tuscaloosa, AL	#8 Alabama	21	Ole Miss	10
43	October 21, 1995	Oxford, MS	#21 Alabama	23	Ole Miss	9
44	October 19, 1996	Tuscaloosa, AL	#7 Alabama	37	Ole Miss	0
45	October 25, 1997	Oxford, MS	Alabama	29	Ole Miss	20
46	October 10, 1998	Tuscaloosa, AL	Alabama	20	Ole Miss	17^{OT}
47	October 16, 1999	Oxford, MS	#11 Alabama	30	#22 Ole Miss	24
48	October 14, 2000	Tuscaloosa, AL	Alabama	45	Ole Miss	7
49	October 13, 2001	Oxford, MS	Ole Miss	27	Alabama	24
50	October 19, 2002	Tuscaloosa, AL	#24 Alabama	42	#21 Ole Miss	7
51	October 18, 2003	Oxford, MS	Ole Miss	43	Alabama	28
52	September 11, 2004	Tuscaloosa, AL	Alabama	28	Ole Miss	7
53	October 15, 2005	Oxford, MS	#6 Alabama^{‡}	13	Ole Miss	10
54	October 14, 2006	Tuscaloosa, AL	Alabama^{‡}	26	Ole Miss	23^{OT}
55	October 13, 2007	Oxford, MS	Alabama^{‡}	27	Ole Miss	24
56	October 18, 2008	Tuscaloosa, AL	#2 Alabama	24	Ole Miss	20
57	October 10, 2009	Oxford, MS	#3 Alabama	22	#20 Ole Miss	3
58	October 16, 2010	Tuscaloosa, AL	#8 Alabama	23	Ole Miss	10
59	October 15, 2011	Oxford, MS	#2 Alabama	52	Ole Miss	7
60	September 29, 2012	Tuscaloosa, AL	#1 Alabama	33	Ole Miss	14
61	September 28, 2013	Tuscaloosa, AL	#1 Alabama	25	#21 Ole Miss	0
62	October 4, 2014	Oxford, MS	#11 Ole Miss^{§}	23	#3 Alabama	17
63	September 19, 2015	Tuscaloosa, AL	#15 Ole Miss	43	#2 Alabama	37
64	September 17, 2016	Oxford, MS	#1 Alabama	48	#19 Ole Miss	43
65	September 30, 2017	Tuscaloosa, AL	#1 Alabama	66	Ole Miss	3
66	September 15, 2018	Oxford, MS	#1 Alabama	62	Ole Miss	7
67	September 28, 2019	Tuscaloosa, AL	#2 Alabama	59	Ole Miss	31
68	October 10, 2020	Oxford, MS	#2 Alabama	63	Ole Miss	48
69	October 2, 2021	Tuscaloosa, AL	#1 Alabama	42	#12 Ole Miss	21
70	November 12, 2022	Oxford, MS	#9 Alabama	30	#11 Ole Miss	24
71	September 23, 2023	Tuscaloosa, AL	#13 Alabama	24	#15 Ole Miss	10
Series: Alabama leads 55–10–2
† Alabama forfeited as part of NCAA penalties. ‡ Alabama vacated wins as part of NCAA penalties. § Ole Miss vacated win as part of NCAA penalties.

=== Locations ===
State	City	Games	Alabama victories	Ole Miss victories	Ties	Years played
Alabama	Tuscaloosa	32	29	3	0	1900–01, 1912–32, 1981–present
Alabama	Birmingham	8	7	0	1	1915, 1933, 1965–77
Alabama	Mobile	1	1	0	0	1944
Mississippi	Oxford	15	11	4	0	1993– present
Mississippi	Jackson	11	6	4	1	1894, 1899, 1966–1989
Mississippi	Columbus	1	1	0	0	1907
Mississippi	Greenville	1	0	1	0	1910
Louisiana	New Orleans	1	1	0	0	1964

== See also ==
- List of NCAA college football rivalry games
