= 1962 Gotham Bowl =

- 2nd Gotham Bowl
Nebraska Cornhuskers	Miami Hurricanes
(8–2)	(7–3)
MVIAA	Independent
36	34
Head coach: Bob Devaney	Head coach: Andy Gustafson
	AP / Coaches; NR / 18
	1	2	3	4	Total
Nebraska	6	14	8	8	36
Miami	6	14	7	7	34
- Date: December 15, 1962
- Season: 1962
- Stadium: Yankee Stadium
- Location: New York City, New York
- MVP: George Mira (Miami QB)
- Favorite: Miami
- Halftime show: Joyce Burns
- Attendance: 6,166

United States TV coverage
- Network: ABC (delayed)

The 1962 Gotham Bowl was the second and final edition of the college football bowl game, played on December 15, 1962, at Yankee Stadium in New York City. The Nebraska Cornhuskers of the MVIAA defeated the Miami Hurricanes 36–34.

Despite poor organization and freezing temperatures, the game itself was tightly contested, featuring five lead changes and 800 combined yards of offense. Nebraska survived a record-setting day by All-American Miami quarterback George Mira to register the program's first postseason victory.

== Teams ==
=== Nebraska ===
Nebraska finished third in the MVIAA under first-year head coach Bob Devaney to make its first bowl appearance in eight years. Devaney, initially hesitant to accept a postseason invitation and forfeit offseason recruiting time, agreed to play in the Gotham Bowl just eleven days beforehand. The team was delayed at the airport for hours until the pilot received confirmation that Nebraska had received its $35,000 allotment for appearing in the game. After landing in New York, Devaney said to reporters, "I'll tell you right now, if I had to do it over again, I wouldn't. That's for damn sure."

=== Miami ===
Miami entered 7–3, making its second consecutive bowl appearance after a one-point loss to Syracuse in the 1961 Liberty Bowl. The Hurricanes chose to play in the Gotham Bowl over an invite from the more lucrative and travel-friendly Gator Bowl, believing a game in New York City would add national exposure. Like Nebraska, Miami became concerned about the Gotham Bowl's ability to make its promised payouts to the schools ($35,000 to NU and $30,000 to Miami, with the Hurricanes to receive a larger portion of gate revenue), but did not delay its travel.

== Game ==
The temperature at kickoff was a damp 14 °F (−10 °C), prompting Nebraska staff members to put their players in running shoes instead of cleats. As a result of the weather and poor marketing (a newspaper strike in New York City limited coverage of the game leading up to kickoff), announced attendance was just 6,166, with significantly less actually in the stadium.

Miami lost two early fumbles in its own territory, the second of which set up Nebraska for an opening touchdown. The Hurricanes tied the game seven minutes later on a George Mira pass to Ben Rizzo. Failed conversions by each team (a two-point attempt by Nebraska and a kick by Miami) kept the score 6–6 to end the opening quarter. Minutes later, Mira threw his second touchdown to give Miami its first lead of the game, but a conversion pass fell incomplete. The Cornhuskers immediately responded when Willie Ross returned the ensuing kickoff for a touchdown.

Miami retook the lead after an eleven-play drive capped by the first of two one-yard Nick Ryder touchdown runs. Nebraska's offense struggled for much of the half, but tied the game just before intermission on its first extended drive.

In one of the final years of college football's one-platoon system, NU quarterback and safety Dennis Claridge starred on both sides of the ball in the second half. After leading a seventy-yard drive and running in a conversion to give the Cornhuskers a 28–27 lead, Claridge intercepted Mira and set up another NU scoring drive. Mira, who finished with 321 passing yards on forty-six attempts, marched the Hurricanes downfield to cut the lead back to two with most of the fourth quarter remaining. Driving into NU territory with a chance to take the lead in the closing minutes, he was intercepted again by Bob Brown to seal Nebraska's first postseason victory.

=== Scoring summary ===
Qtr	Team	Time	Detail	NU	MIA
1	NU	7:21	Bill Thornton 2-yd run (run failed)	6	0
1	MIA	0:29	Ben Rizzo 10-yd pass from George Mira (kick failed)	6	6
2	MIA	12:31	Nick Spinnelli 30-yd pass from Mira (pass failed)	6	12
2	NU	12:18	Willie Ross 92-yd kickoff return (Rudy Johnson kick)	13	12
2	MIA	7:20	Nick Ryder 1-yd run (Ryder pass from Mira)	13	20
2	NU	0:42	Mike Eger 6-yd pass from Dennis Claridge (Johnson kick)	20	20
3	MIA	8:44	John Bennett 3-yd run (Bobby Wilson kick)	20	27
3	NU	0:08	Thornton 1-yd run (Claridge run)	28	27
4	NU	13:32	Ross 1-yd run (Thornton run)	36	27
4	MIA	9:29	Ryder 1-yd run (Wilson kick)	36	34

=== Team statistics ===
Statistic	Nebraska	Miami
First downs	12	34
Rushes–yards	42–150	43–181
Comp.–att.–yards	9–14–146	24–46–321
Total yards	296	502
Turnovers	2	4
Punts–average	6–37.0	1–35.0
Penalties–yards	6–69	1–5

== Aftermath ==
Mira set school records for passing yards and completions despite the frigid conditions, and was named most valuable player. The game was broadcast live on ABC in South Florida and Nebraska, with an abbreviated version shown tape-delayed at 5:00 p.m. EST.

The Gotham Bowl, intended as a fundraiser for the nonprofit organization March of Dimes, lost over $150,000 in its two years of existence according to executive director Bob Curran. It was disbanded after the 1962 edition, and postseason football did not return to New York City until the advent of the Pinstripe Bowl in 2010.

Miami and Nebraska became frequent bowl opponents in later decades, meeting five more times in the postseason, including four Orange Bowls and three national championship games.

== See also ==
- Miami–Nebraska football rivalry
