= 1963 Ole Miss Rebels football team =

American college football season

1963 Ole Miss Rebels football
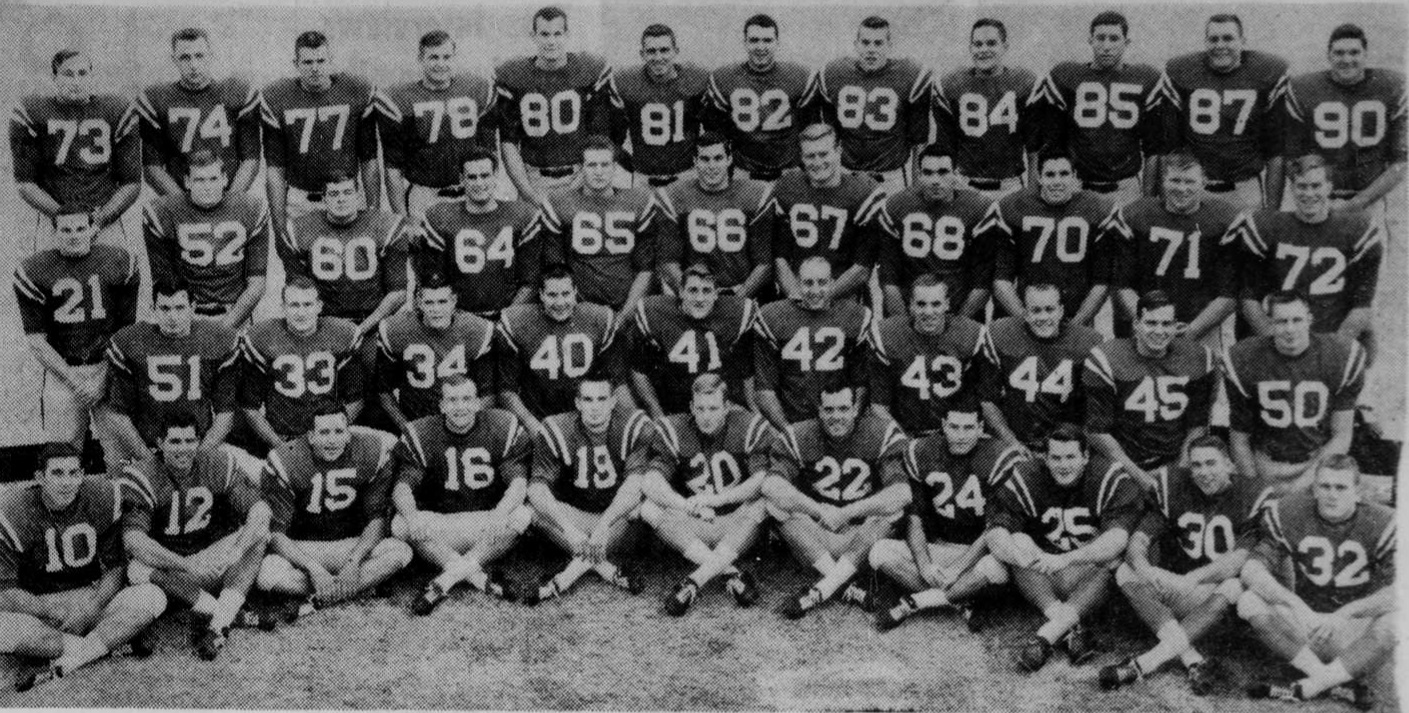

SEC champion

Sugar Bowl, L 7–12 vs. Alabama
- Conference: Southeastern Conference

Ranking
- Coaches: No. 7
- AP: No. 7
- Record: 7–1–2 (5–0–1 SEC)
- Head coach: Johnny Vaught (17th season)
- Captains: Kenny Dill; Whaley Hall
- Home stadium: Hemingway Stadium; Crump Stadium

1963 Southeastern Conference football standings
	Conf.					Overall
Team	W		L		T	W		L		T
No. 7 Ole Miss $	5	–	0	–	1	7	–	1	–	2
No. 5 Auburn	6	–	1	–	0	9	–	2	–	0
No. 8 Alabama	6	–	2	–	0	9	–	2	–	0
Mississippi State	4	–	1	–	2	7	–	2	–	2
LSU	4	–	2	–	0	7	–	4	–	0
Georgia Tech	4	–	3	–	0	7	–	3	–	0
Florida	3	–	3	–	1	6	–	3	–	1
Tennessee	3	–	5	–	0	5	–	5	–	0
Georgia	2	–	4	–	0	4	–	5	–	1
Vanderbilt	0	–	5	–	2	1	–	7	–	2
Kentucky	0	–	5	–	1	3	–	6	–	1
Tulane	0	–	6	–	1	1	–	8	–	1
$ – Conference champion; Rankings from AP Poll

The 1963 Ole Miss Rebels football team represented the University of Mississippi during the 1963 NCAA University Division football season. The Rebels were led by 17th-year head coach Johnny Vaught and played their home games at Hemingway Stadium in Oxford, Mississippi. Ole Miss were champions of the Southeastern Conference, finishing the regular season with a record of 7–0–2 (5–0–1 SEC) and ranked 7th in the final AP Poll. They were invited to the 1964 Sugar Bowl, where they lost to fellow SEC member Alabama.

This was the last season until 1994 the Rebels did not play a home game at Mississippi Veterans Memorial Stadium in Jackson.

Through the 2025 season, this is Ole Miss' most recent conference championship.

== Schedule ==
Date	Opponent	Rank	Site	TV	Result	Attendance	Source
September 21	at Memphis State*	No. 2	Crump Stadium; Memphis, TN (rivalry)		T 0–0	31,650–32,500	
September 28	at Kentucky	No. 7	McLean Stadium; Lexington, KY		W 31–7	37,500	
October 5	at Houston*	No. 10	Rice Stadium; Houston, TX		W 20–6	30,000	
October 19	at Tulane	No. 5	Tulane Stadium; New Orleans, LA (rivalry)		W 21–0	17,000	
October 26	Vanderbilt^{†}	No. 5	Hemingway Stadium; Oxford, MS (rivalry)		W 27–7	21,500	
November 2	at LSU	No. 3	Tiger Stadium; Baton Rouge, LA (rivalry)	CBS	W 37–3	67,500	
November 9	Tampa*	No. 3	Hemingway Stadium; Oxford, MS		W 41–0	15,800	
November 16	vs. Tennessee	No. 3	Crump Stadium; Memphis, TN (rivalry)		W 20–0	27,022	
November 30	at Mississippi State	No. 3	Scott Field; Starkville, MS (Egg Bowl)		T 10–10	35,218	
January 1	vs. No. 9 Alabama*	No. 7	Tulane Stadium; New Orleans, LA (Sugar Bowl / rivalry)	NBC	L 7–12	80,785	
*Non-conference game; ^{†}Homecoming; Rankings from AP Poll released prior to the game

== Personnel ==
1963 Ole Miss Rebels football team roster
Players
Coaches
Offense

Pos.	#	Name	Class
QB	10	Perry Lee Dunn	Sr
RB		Mike Dennis	So

Defense

Pos.	#	Name	Class

Special teams

Pos.	#	Name	Class

Head coach

- Johnny Vaught

Coordinators/assistant coaches

Legend

- (C) Team captain
- (S) Suspended
- (I) Ineligible
- Injured
- Redshirt

== Awards ==
Perry Lee Dunn - 2nd Team All-SEC (AP, UPI)
