= 1963 Georgia Tech Yellow Jackets football team =

American college football season

1963 Georgia Tech Yellow Jackets football
- Conference: Southeastern Conference
- Record: 7–3 (4–3 SEC)
- Head coach: Bobby Dodd (19th season)
- Captain: Billy Lothridge
- Home stadium: Grant Field

1963 Southeastern Conference football standings
	Conf.					Overall
Team	W		L		T	W		L		T
No. 7 Ole Miss $	5	–	0	–	1	7	–	1	–	2
No. 5 Auburn	6	–	1	–	0	9	–	2	–	0
No. 8 Alabama	6	–	2	–	0	9	–	2	–	0
Mississippi State	4	–	1	–	2	7	–	2	–	2
LSU	4	–	2	–	0	7	–	4	–	0
Georgia Tech	4	–	3	–	0	7	–	3	–	0
Florida	3	–	3	–	1	6	–	3	–	1
Tennessee	3	–	5	–	0	5	–	5	–	0
Georgia	2	–	4	–	0	4	–	5	–	1
Vanderbilt	0	–	5	–	2	1	–	7	–	2
Kentucky	0	–	5	–	1	3	–	6	–	1
Tulane	0	–	6	–	1	1	–	8	–	1
$ – Conference champion; Rankings from AP Poll

The 1963 Georgia Tech Yellow Jackets football team represented the Georgia Institute of Technology during the 1963 NCAA University Division football season. The Yellow Jackets were led by 19th-year head coach Bobby Dodd, and played their home games at Grant Field in Atlanta. For the final time before becoming independent, they competed as members of the Southeastern Conference, finishing in sixth. Quarterback Billy Lothridge threw for 1,000 yards and 10 touchdowns and finished in 2nd in the Heisman Trophy voting.

== Schedule ==
Date	Opponent	Rank	Site	TV	Result	Attendance	Source
September 14	Florida		Grant Field; Atlanta, GA	ABC	W 9–0	43,000	
September 28	Clemson*	No. 9	Grant Field; Atlanta, GA (rivalry)		W 27–0	33,916	
October 5	at LSU	No. 7	Tiger Stadium; Baton Rouge, LA		L 6–7	67,500	
October 12	at Tennessee		Neyland Stadium; Knoxville, TN (rivalry)		W 23–7	51,527	
October 19	Auburn	No. 8	Grant Field; Atlanta, GA (rivalry)		L 21–29	53,091	
October 26	at Tulane		Tulane Stadium; New Orleans, LA		W 17–3	15,000	
November 2	Duke*^{†}		Grant Field; Atlanta, GA		W 30–6	52,266	
November 9	Florida State*		Grant Field; Atlanta, GA		W 15–7	49,804	
November 16	at No. 7 Alabama		Legion Field; Birmingham, AL (rivalry)		L 11–27	54,000	
November 30	Georgia		Grant Field; Atlanta, GA (rivalry)		W 14–3	53,052	
*Non-conference game; ^{†}Homecoming; Rankings from AP Poll released prior to the game
