= Miami–Nebraska football rivalry =

American college football rivalry

- Miami Hurricanes Nebraska Cornhuskers
- Sport: Football
- First meeting: November 30, 1951; Miami, 19–7
- Latest meeting: September 19, 2015; Miami, 36–33^{OT}

Statistics
- Total meetings: 12
- All-time series: Tied, 6–6
- Largest victory: Miami, 37–14 (2002)
- Longest win streak: Nebraska, 4 (1953–1976)
- Current win streak: Miami, 1 (2015–present)

Locations of Miami and Nebraska

The Miami–Nebraska football rivalry is an American college football rivalry between the Miami Hurricanes and Nebraska Cornhuskers. Though infrequently contested, the teams have met in several high-profile games, including four Orange Bowls and three national championship games.

== History ==
The teams first met in Miami in 1951, a 19–7 Hurricanes victory, and played again two years later in Lincoln. Nebraska won its first bowl game against the Hurricanes in the 1962 Gotham Bowl, a narrow NU victory on a frigid day in New York City. Miami hired former Cornhuskers offensive assistant Carl Selmer as its head coach in 1975, who brought his team to Lincoln in both of his seasons.

A resurgent Miami program led by Howard Schnellenberger met top-ranked Nebraska in the 1984 Orange Bowl. NU fell behind 17–0 in the second quarter before converting a fumblerooski, a trick play which had quarterback Turner Gill set the ball on the ground to be picked up. Miami led for the entire game until Nebraska scored with less than a minute remaining to bring its deficit to a single point. Instead of kicking an extra point to tie the game (likely resulting in Nebraska being voted national champion), Tom Osborne elected to go for two and the outright win. Gill's conversion pass fell incomplete, and the next day Miami leaped four other teams to win its first national championship, establishing a dynasty that lasted for a decade. It is often considered one of the best games in college football history.

Miami beat Nebraska in two more Orange Bowl games over the following decade, claiming another national title in 1991. The teams met again in the 1995 Orange Bowl, the third Bowl Coalition-designated national championship. Nebraska, rotating between injured starting quarterback Tommie Frazier and backup Brook Berringer, slowly wore down a strong Miami defensive front. The Cornhuskers used a pair of fourth-quarter touchdowns to win 24–17, giving Osborne his first consensus national title as a head coach. Seven years later, Miami and Nebraska played in the 2002 BCS National Championship Game, a convincing Hurricanes victory.

The rivalry was renewed in 2014, a 41–31 Nebraska win in front of the largest football crowd in Memorial Stadium history. The following year, Miami fended off a frantic Cornhuskers rally, winning 36–33 in overtime. No future games are scheduled.

== Game results ==
Miami victories	Nebraska victories

No.	Date	Location	Winning team		Losing team	
1	November 30, 1951	Miami	Miami	19	Nebraska	7
2	October 17, 1953	Lincoln	Nebraska	20	Miami	16
3	December 15, 1962	New York City	Nebraska	36	Miami	34
4	October 4, 1975	Lincoln	#4 Nebraska	31	Miami	16
5	October 2, 1976	Lincoln	#5 Nebraska	17	Miami	9
6	January 2, 1984	Miami	#5 Miami	31	#1 Nebraska	30
7	January 2, 1989	Miami	#2 Miami	23	#6 Nebraska	3
8	January 1, 1992	Miami	#1 Miami	22	#11 Nebraska	0
9	January 1, 1995	Miami	#1 Nebraska	24	#3 Miami	17
10	January 3, 2002	Pasadena	#1 Miami	37	#4 Nebraska	14
11	September 20, 2014	Lincoln	#24 Nebraska	41	Miami	31
12	September 19, 2015	Miami Gardens	Miami	36	Nebraska	33^{OT}
Series: Tied 6–6

== See also ==
- List of NCAA college football rivalry games
