= Dennis Claridge =

American football player (1941–2018)

No. 10
- Position: Quarterback

Personal information
- Born: August 18, 1941; Phoenix, Arizona, U.S.
- Died: May 1, 2018 (aged 76); Lincoln, Nebraska, U.S.
- Listed height: 6 ft 2 in (1.88 m)
- Listed weight: 220 lb (100 kg)

Career information
- High school: Robbinsdale (MN)
- College: Nebraska
- NFL draft: 1963: 3rd round, 39th overall pick
- AFL draft: 1963: 26th round, 201 (Oakland Raiders)th overall pick

Career history
- Green Bay Packers (1964–1965); Atlanta Falcons (1966)

Awards and highlights
- NFL champion (1965); 2× First-team All-Big Eight (1962, 1963)

Career NFL statistics
- Passing attempts: 71
- Passing completions: 41
- Completion percentage: 57.7%
- TD–INT: 2–2
- Passing yards: 484
- Passer rating: 76.3
- Stats at Pro Football Reference

Dennis Bert Claridge (August 18, 1941 – May 1, 2018) was an American professional football player, a quarterback in the National Football League (NFL) for the Green Bay Packers and Atlanta Falcons. He played college football at the University of Nebraska under head coaches Bill Jennings and Bob Devaney, and later attended its dental school.

Born in Phoenix, Arizona, Claridge played high school football in Minnesota at Robbinsdale, a suburb northwest of Minneapolis. As a senior in college in 1963, he led Nebraska to an undefeated season in the Big Eight Conference, a 9–1 regular season, and a victory over Auburn in the Orange Bowl.

Selected in third round of the 1963 NFL draft as a junior eligible, Claridge stayed in college and joined the Packers in 1964. He was a member of the NFL championship team in 1965, playing behind Hall of Fame quarterback Bart Starr and Zeke Bratkowski under head coach Vince Lombardi. Claridge was selected in the 1966 expansion draft by the Falcons. Green Bay was interested in reacquiring him for the 1967 season, but he left the NFL after three seasons to complete dental school.

Claridge later worked as an orthodontist in Lincoln, Nebraska. He died in 2018 of bladder cancer at the age of 76.
