= Benny Nelson =

American football player (born 1941)

No. 28
- Positions: Halfback, Defensive back

Personal information
- Born: April 1, 1941 (age 85); Gadsden, Alabama, U.S.
- Listed height: 6 ft 0 in (1.83 m)
- Listed weight: 185 lb (84 kg)

Career information
- High school: Huntsville (Huntsville, Alabama)
- College: Alabama (1960-1963)
- NFL draft: 1964: 5th round, 61st overall pick
- AFL draft: 1964: 12th round, 94th overall pick

Career history
- Houston Oilers (1964)

Awards and highlights
- Second-team All-American (1963); First-team All-SEC (1963)

Career AFL statistics
- Interceptions: 1
- Touchdowns: 1
- Stats at Pro Football Reference

James Benjamin Nelson (born April 1, 1941) is an American former professional football player who was a halfback and defensive back for one season with the Houston Oilers of the American Football League (AFL) in 1964. He played college football for the Alabama Crimson Tide, serving as co-captain on their 1963 team.
