= 1964 Orange Bowl =

American college football game

- 30th Orange Bowl
Nebraska Cornhuskers	Auburn Tigers
(9–1)	(9–1)
Big Eight	SEC
13	7
Head coach: Bob Devaney	Head coach: Ralph Jordan
AP / Coaches; 6 / 5	AP / Coaches; 5 / 6
	1	2	3	4	Total
Nebraska	10	3	0	0	13
Auburn	0	0	7	0	7
- Date: January 1, 1964
- Season: 1963
- Stadium: Miami Orange Bowl
- Location: Miami, Florida
- Favorite: Auburn by 3
- Referee: Pat Haggerty (Big Eight)
- Attendance: 72,647

United States TV coverage
- Network: ABC
- Announcers: Curt Gowdy, Paul Christman, Jim McKay
- Nielsen ratings: 11.0

The 1964 Orange Bowl was the thirtieth edition of the college football bowl game, played on January 1, 1964 at the Miami Orange Bowl in Miami, Florida. Part of the 1963–64 bowl season, it featured the sixth-ranked Nebraska Cornhuskers of the Big Eight Conference and the fifth-ranked Auburn Tigers of the SEC. In a game billed as a battle between Nebraska's strength and Auburn's speed, the Cornhuskers jumped out to an early lead and held on to win 13–7.

== Teams ==
=== Nebraska ===
Nebraska won its first Big Eight title in over twenty years under second-year head coach Bob Devaney. The Cornhuskers entered 9–1, falling to Air Force before winning five consecutive games, including a 29–20 victory over sixth-ranked Oklahoma in a de facto conference championship game. NU was led by a strong offensive line and ground attack, which led the country in rushing at 263 yards per game.

Nine Nebraska players had been selected in the 1964 NFL draft a month earlier, including No. 2 overall pick Bob Brown, but they were not permitted to meet with professional teams or discuss contracts until after the Orange Bowl.

=== Auburn ===
Auburn finished second in the SEC, losing to Mississippi State before a strong season-ending stretch that included a 10–8 victory over rival Alabama. The team was led by quarterback Jimmy Sidle, the SEC's Player of the Year who finished second nationally with 1,006 rushing yards. This was Auburn's first bowl appearance since 1955 and first Orange Bowl since 1938.

== Game ==
Quarterback Dennis Claridge gave the Cornhuskers a 7–0 lead on the game's second play from scrimmage, when NU's powerful offensive line sprung him on an Orange Bowl-record 68-yard touchdown run. Claridge finished with 108 rushing yards after combining for just 179 across NU's ten regular season games. Dave Theisen added two field goals to give NU a 13–0 halftime lead.

Nebraska's offense, prolific in the first half, stalled in the latter stages, allowing Sidle a chance to stage a comeback. Near the end of the third quarter, he scored from thirteen yards out to bring Auburn within six. The Tigers drove into the Nebraska red zone in the closing minutes, passing 200 yards of offense in the second half after managing just 72 in the first, but a fourth-down pass was batted down by NU linebacker John Kirby. It sealed Nebraska's first major bowl win, and gave the Big Eight its first Orange Bowl victory over the SEC in five tries.

=== Scoring summary ===
Qtr	Team	Time	Detail	NU	AU
1	NU	13:47	Dennis Claridge 68-yard run (Dave Theisen kick)	7	0
1	NU	5:26	Thiesen 31-yd field goal	10	0
2	NU	13:05	Thiesen 36-yd field goal	13	0
3	AU	3:32	Jimmy Sidle 13-yd run (Woody Woodall kick)	13	7

=== Team statistics ===
Statistic	Nebraska	Auburn
First downs	11	17
Rushes–yards	46–204	35–126
Comp.–att.–yards	4–9–30	14–27–157
Total offense	234	283
Turnovers	1	2
Punts–average	7–38.3	6–35.2
Penalties–yards	6–65	5–39

== Aftermath ==
In a postgame interview, Devaney noted that his team "wanted to justify being down here," referencing the SEC's dominant victories over the Big Eight in the previous two Orange Bowls. In the early 1960s, the Orange Bowl had grown hesitant about its partnership with the Big Eight, hoping to expand its selection pool, but later decided to renew the agreement.

Most audio from the telecast survives, but video footage is lost. The telecast on ABC was in direct competition with the Cotton Bowl on CBS and the Sugar Bowl on NBC. The following year, the Orange Bowl's broadcast rights transferred to NBC, which moved kickoff to 8 p.m. to make it the finale of the network's New Year's Day tripleheader of major bowl games.

The 1964 game was the second of seventeen Orange Bowl appearances by the Cornhuskers. Auburn has yet to return to the game.
