= 1963 Florida Gators football team =

American college football season

1963 Florida Gators football
- Conference: Southeastern Conference
- Record: 6–3–1 (3–3–1 SEC)
- Head coach: Ray Graves (4th season)
- Offensive coordinator: Pepper Rodgers (4th season)
- Home stadium: Florida Field

1963 Southeastern Conference football standings
	Conf.					Overall
Team	W		L		T	W		L		T
No. 7 Ole Miss $	5	–	0	–	1	7	–	1	–	2
No. 5 Auburn	6	–	1	–	0	9	–	2	–	0
No. 8 Alabama	6	–	2	–	0	9	–	2	–	0
Mississippi State	4	–	1	–	2	7	–	2	–	2
LSU	4	–	2	–	0	7	–	4	–	0
Georgia Tech	4	–	3	–	0	7	–	3	–	0
Florida	3	–	3	–	1	6	–	3	–	1
Tennessee	3	–	5	–	0	5	–	5	–	0
Georgia	2	–	4	–	0	4	–	5	–	1
Vanderbilt	0	–	5	–	2	1	–	7	–	2
Kentucky	0	–	5	–	1	3	–	6	–	1
Tulane	0	–	6	–	1	1	–	8	–	1
$ – Conference champion; Rankings from AP Poll

The 1963 Florida Gators football team represented the University of Florida during the 1963 NCAA University Division football season. The season was Ray Graves' fourth as the head coach of the Florida Gators football team. The Gators started their season 1–1–1, the Gators having eked out their single win over the Richmond Spiders (35–28). Graves' 1963 Florida Gators won their last three games over the Georgia Bulldogs (21–14), Miami Hurricanes (27–21) and Florida State Seminoles (7–0) to finish 6–3–1 overall and 3–3–1 in the Southeastern Conference (SEC), placing seventh of twelve SEC teams.

The game against Miami was only one of 6 games not to be canceled or postponed due to the assassination of President John F. Kennedy the day before.

== Schedule ==
Date	Opponent	Site	TV	Result	Attendance	Source
September 14	at Georgia Tech	Grant Field; Atlanta, GA	ABC	L 0–9	43,000	
September 28	Mississippi State	Florida Field; Gainesville, FL		T 9–9	36,000	
October 5	Richmond*	Florida Field; Gainesville, FL		W 35–28	26,871	
October 12	at No. 3 Alabama	Denny Stadium; Tuscaloosa, AL (rivalry)		W 10–6	43,000	
October 19	at Vanderbilt	Dudley Field; Nashville, TN		W 21–0	16,500	
October 26	LSU^{†}	Florida Field; Gainesville, FL (rivalry)		L 0–14	46,000	
November 2	at No. 5 Auburn	Cliff Hare Stadium; Auburn, AL (rivalry)		L 0–19	47,000	
November 9	vs. Georgia	Gator Bowl Stadium; Jacksonville, FL (rivalry)		W 21–14	48,235	
November 23	at Miami (FL)*	Orange Bowl Stadium; Miami, FL (rivalry)		W 27–21	57,773	
November 30	Florida State*	Florida Field; Gainesville, FL (rivalry)		W 7–0	45,000	
*Non-conference game; ^{†}Homecoming; Rankings from AP Poll released prior to the game
