= 1963 Alabama Crimson Tide football team =

American college football season

1963 Alabama Crimson Tide football

Sugar Bowl champion

Sugar Bowl, W 12–7 vs. Ole Miss
- Conference: Southeastern Conference

Ranking
- Coaches: No. 9
- AP: No. 8
- Record: 9–2 (6–2 SEC)
- Head coach: Bear Bryant (6th season)
- Offensive coordinator: Howard Schnellenberger (3rd season)
- Defensive coordinator: Gene Stallings (2nd season)
- Captains: Steve Allen; Benny Nelson
- Home stadium: Denny Stadium; Legion Field; Ladd Stadium

1963 Southeastern Conference football standings
	Conf.					Overall
Team	W		L		T	W		L		T
No. 7 Ole Miss $	5	–	0	–	1	7	–	1	–	2
No. 5 Auburn	6	–	1	–	0	9	–	2	–	0
No. 8 Alabama	6	–	2	–	0	9	–	2	–	0
Mississippi State	4	–	1	–	2	7	–	2	–	2
LSU	4	–	2	–	0	7	–	4	–	0
Georgia Tech	4	–	3	–	0	7	–	3	–	0
Florida	3	–	3	–	1	6	–	3	–	1
Tennessee	3	–	5	–	0	5	–	5	–	0
Georgia	2	–	4	–	0	4	–	5	–	1
Vanderbilt	0	–	5	–	2	1	–	7	–	2
Kentucky	0	–	5	–	1	3	–	6	–	1
Tulane	0	–	6	–	1	1	–	8	–	1
$ – Conference champion; Rankings from AP Poll

The 1963 Alabama Crimson Tide football team (variously "Alabama", "UA" or "Bama") represented the University of Alabama in the 1963 NCAA University Division football season. It was the Crimson Tide's 69th overall and 30th season as a member of the Southeastern Conference (SEC). The team was led by head coach Bear Bryant, in his sixth year, and played their home games at Denny Stadium in Tuscaloosa, Legion Field in Birmingham and Ladd Stadium in Mobile, Alabama. They finished season with nine wins and two losses (9–2 overall, 6–2 in the SEC) and with a victory over Ole Miss in the Sugar Bowl.

The Crimson Tide opened the season with wins at Georgia, against Tulane in Mobile and at Vanderbilt en route to a 3–0 start. However, in their fourth game, Alabama was upset by Florida in what was coach Bryant's first loss at Denny Stadium as head coach. They rebounded the week that followed with a shutout victory over Tennessee and then won their next three games against Houston, Mississippi State and Georgia Tech.

In the annual Iron Bowl against Auburn, the Crimson Tide were defeated for the first time by the Tigers since the 1958 season. Although they lost, immediately after the game Alabama accepted an invitation to play Ole Miss in the Sugar Bowl. Before the bowl, the Crimson Tide defeated Miami in their final game of the regular season. They then closed the season with a victory over Ole Miss in the Sugar Bowl.

== Schedule ==
Date	Opponent	Rank	Site	TV	Result	Attendance	Source
September 21	at Georgia	No. 3	Sanford Stadium; Athens, GA (rivalry)		W 32–7	34,980	
September 28	Tulane	No. 2	Ladd Stadium; Mobile, AL		W 28–0	30,102	
October 5	at Vanderbilt	No. 2	Dudley Field; Nashville, TN		W 21–6	23,848	
October 12	Florida	No. 3	Denny Stadium; Tuscaloosa, AL (rivalry)		L 6–10	42,309	
October 19	Tennessee	No. 9	Legion Field; Birmingham, AL (Third Saturday in October)		W 35–0	53,454	
October 26	Houston*	No. 6	Denny Stadium; Tuscaloosa, AL		W 21–13	28,022	
November 2	Mississippi State^{†}	No. 7	Denny Stadium; Tuscaloosa, AL (rivalry)		W 20–19	42,508	
November 16	Georgia Tech	No. 7	Legion Field; Birmingham, AL (rivalry)		W 27–11	53,938	
November 30	vs. No. 9 Auburn	No. 6	Legion Field; Birmingham, AL (Iron Bowl)		L 8–10	54,152	
December 14	at Miami (FL)*	No. 8	Miami Orange Bowl; Miami, FL	CBS	W 17–12	25,472	
January 1, 1964	vs. No. 7 Ole Miss*	No. 8	Tulane Stadium; New Orleans, LA (Sugar Bowl, rivalry)	NBC	W 12–7	80,785	
*Non-conference game; ^{†}Homecoming; Rankings from AP Poll released prior to the game

== Game summaries ==
=== Georgia ===
Team	1	2	3	4	Total
• #3 Alabama	7	3	7	15	32
Georgia	7	0	0	0	7

- Date: September 21
- Location: Sanford Stadium
  Athens, GA
- Game attendance: 34,980

To open the 1963 season, the Crimson Tide defeated the Georgia Bulldogs 32–7 on the road at Athens. The lone Georgia touchdown was set up in the first quarter when Ken Davis recovered a Joe Namath fumble at the Alabama 26-yard line. Seven plays later, Georgia led 7–0 after Fred Barber scored on a three-yard run. The Crimson Tide tied the game later in the quarter on a 47-yard Namath touchdown pass to Charles Stephens and then took a 10–7 halftime lead when Tim Davis connected on a 38-yard field goal in the second quarter. Mike Fracchia then scored the next pair of Alabama touchdowns on runs of five and one-yard before Preston Ridlehuber was tackled for a safety in the fourth quarter. A 41-yard Jack Hurlbut touchdown pass to Jimmy Dill late in the fourth made the final score 32–7.

=== Tulane ===
Team	1	2	3	4	Total
Tulane	0	0	0	0	0
• #2 Alabama	7	14	7	0	28

- Date: September 28
- Location: Ladd Stadium
  Mobile, AL
- Game attendance: 30,102

After their victory over Georgia to open the season, Alabama up one spot in the AP Poll to the No. 2 position. At Mobile, the Crimson Tide shutout the Tulane Green Wave 28–0 in their annual Ladd Stadium game of the season. Alabama took a 7–0 lead in the first quarter after Joe Namath scored on a one-yard touchdown run. The extended their lead to 21–0 at halftime after Benny Nelson scored on a 33-yard run and by Billy Piper on a 51-yard interception return. A 20-yard Hudson Harris touchdown run in the third quarter provided for the final margin in this 28–0 Crimson Tide win.

=== Vanderbilt ===
Team	1	2	3	4	Total
• #2 Alabama	7	7	7	0	21
Vanderbilt	0	6	0	0	6

- Date: October 5
- Location: Dudley Field
  Nashville, TN
- Game attendance: 23,848

After their victory over Tulane, Alabama retained its No. 2 position in the AP Poll prior to their game against Vanderbilt. At Nashville, the Crimson Tide defeated the Commodores 21–6 in a game that saw Benny Nelson score twice on long touchdown runs for Alabama. Midway through the first quarter, Nelson gave the Crimson Tide a 7–0 lead with his 50-yard touchdown run. Vanderbilt responded in the second quarter with a 25-yard Jon Cleveland touchdown pass to Toby Wilt; however the extra point was blocked and Alabama retained a 7–6 lead. Mike Fracchia then scored on a one-yard touchdown run that made the halftime score 14–6. Nelson then scored the final points of the game with his 97-yard kickoff return in the third quarter that made the final score 21–6.

=== Florida ===
Team	1	2	3	4	Total
• Florida	3	0	0	7	10
#3 Alabama	0	0	0	6	6

- Date: October 12
- Location: Denny Stadium
  Tuscaloosa, AL
- Game attendance: 42,309

After their closer than expected victory over Vanderbilt, Alabama dropped from the No. 2 to the No. 3 position in the AP Poll prior to their game against Florida. In what was the first Tuscaloosa game of the season, the 17-point favorite Crimson Tide were upset by the Gators 10–6 in what was also coach Bryant's first loss as head coach at Denny Stadium. Bob Lyle gave the Gators an early 3–0 lead with his 42-yard field goal in the first quarter. The Alabama defense then produced a pair of goal line stands in the first half that resulted in a 3–0 Florida lead at halftime. After a scoreless third, Florida took a 10–0 lead in the fourth when Dick Kirk scored on a 42-yard touchdown run. With just over 2:00 left in the game, Joe Namath scored on a one-yard run to end the shutout bid, but Alabama still lost 10–6.

=== Tennessee ===
Third Saturday in October

Team	1	2	3	4	Total
Tennessee	0	0	0	0	0
• #9 Alabama	14	7	14	0	35

- Date: October 19
- Location: Legion Field
  Birmingham, AL
- Game attendance: 53,454

Alabama dropped from the No. 3 position back into the No. 9 spot in the week leading into their game at Tennessee after their upset loss against Florida. Against the Volunteers, Alabama shutout Tennessee 35–0 in the first Legion Field game of the season. The Crimson Tide took a 7–0 lead in the first quarter after Benny Nelson scored on a 36-yard touchdown run. Joe Namath then was responsible for the remaining four touchdowns scored on the afternoon. He first threw a 26-yard scoring pass to Jimmy Dill late in the first and then threw a three-yard pass to Charles Stephens in the second that gave Alabama a 21–0 halftime lead. In the third, Namath threw his third touchdown pass to Hudson Harris from five-yards out then scored himself on a one-yard run that made the final score 35–0.

=== Houston ===
Team	1	2	3	4	Total
Houston	0	7	0	6	13
• #6 Alabama	7	0	7	7	21

- Date: October 26
- Location: Denny Stadium
  Tuscaloosa, AL
- Game attendance: 28,022

As a result of their shutout win over Tennessee, the Crimson Tide moved into the No. 6 position in the AP poll prior to their game against Houston. Against a winless Cougars squad, Alabama struggled to a 21–13 victory at Denny Stadium. After a seven-yard Joe Namath touchdown pass to Benny Nelson gave the Crimson Tide a 7–0 lead in the first, a 41-yard Jack Skrog touchdown pass to Mike Spratt in the second for Houston tied the game 7–7 at halftime. The Crimson Tide retook the lead in the third on a 35-yard Nelson touchdown run and extended it to 21–7 on a 12-yard Namath touchdown pass to Ray Ogden early in the fourth. The Cougars then cut the lead to 21–13 after Spratt scored on a 75-yard touchdown run, but were unable to complete the comeback in the loss.

=== Mississippi State ===
Team	1	2	3	4	Total
Mississippi State	0	12	7	0	19
• #7 Alabama	3	10	0	7	20

- Date: November 2
- Location: Denny Stadium
  Tuscaloosa, AL
- Game attendance: 42,508

Although they did defeat Houston in their previous contest, Alabama dropped into the No. 7 ranking as they prepared to play Mississippi State. On homecoming in Tuscaloosa, the Crimson Tide scored a game-winning touchdown in the final four minutes of the game and defeated the Bulldogs 20–19. After Alabama took an early 3–0 lead on a 43-yard Tim Davis field goal in the first, State responded and took a 12–3 lead in the second quarter. The Bulldogs scored touchdowns on a one-yard Dan Bland run and on a 45-yard Larry Swearengen interception return of a Joe Namath pass. Alabama responded later in the quarter with a 40-yard Namath touchdown pass to Jimmy Dill and a 31-yard Davis field goal and took a 13–12 halftime lead. After a four-yard Swearengen run gave the Bulldogs a 19–13 lead in the third quarter, Namath scored the game-tying touchdown in the fourth quarter with just over four minutes left in the game. The Davis extra point that ensued provided for the final margin in Alabama's 20–19 win.

=== Georgia Tech ===
Team	1	2	3	4	Total
Georgia Tech	0	3	8	0	11
• #7 Alabama	7	7	0	13	27

- Date: November 16
- Location: Legion Field
  Birmingham, AL
- Game attendance: 53,938

Coming off their bye week prior to their game against Georgia Tech, the Crimson Tide retained the No. 7 position in the AP poll. Behind strong performances on both sides of the ball, Alabama defeated the Yellow Jackets 27–11 at Legion Field. The Crimson Tide scored first on a 44-yard Ray Ogden touchdown run for a 7–0 first quarter lead. In the second, Tech scored on a 41-yard Billy Lothridge field goal and Alabama scored on a one-yard Benny Nelson touchdown run that made the halftime score 14–3. The Jackets responded with a two-yard Lothridge touchdown run in the third that cut the Crimson Tide lead to 14–11. Alabama then closed the game with fourth-quarter touchdowns scored on runs of six-yards by Nelson and one-yard by Joe Namath.

=== Auburn ===
Iron Bowl

Team	1	2	3	4	Total
• #9 Auburn	3	0	7	0	10
#6 Alabama	0	0	8	0	8

- Date: November 30
- Location: Legion Field
  Birmingham, AL
- Game attendance: 54,152

In the week prior to their game against Auburn, Alabama moved into the No. 6 position in the AP poll and the Tigers were in the No. 9 position. In the annual Iron Bowl game, Alabama was defeated by the Tigers for the first time since the 1958 season in this 10–8 loss at Legion Field. Auburn scored first on a 32-yard Woody Woodall field goal in the first quarter and maintained their 3–0 lead through halftime. The Tigers then extended their lead to 10–0 in the third quarter when Mailon Kent threw an eight-yard touchdown pass to Tucker Frederickson. Benny Nelson then scored the only Alabama touchdown later in the quarter on an 80-yard run that made the final score 10–8. Although they lost, after the game the Crimson Tide officially accepted an invitation to play in the Sugar Bowl against Ole Miss.

=== Miami (FL) ===
Team	1	2	3	4	Total
• #8 Alabama	14	3	0	0	17
Miami	0	0	0	12	12

- Date: December 14
- Location: Orange Bowl Stadium
  Miami, FL
- Game attendance: 25,472

This game against the Miami was originally scheduled to be played on Friday, October 18, but was subsequently moved to December 7 in order to be televised on CBS. Due to the assassination of John F. Kennedy, the annual Army–Navy Game was pushed back to December 7. As such, CBS requested the Miami-Alabama game be postponed to December 14 in order to avoid conflict that would result from televising both games on the same day. The rescheduling of this game also pushed back the start of the annual Orange Blossom Classic from the afternoon to evening of December 14.

After their loss against Auburn, Alabama dropped into the No. 8 position in the final AP poll of the 1963 season. In the week that led to their game at Miami, coach Bryant suspended starting quarterback Joe Namath for both this game and the Sugar Bowl as he violated team rules. On homecoming at the Orange Bowl, Alabama survived a late Miami rally and defeated the Hurricanes 17–12.

The Crimson Tide took a 14–0 first quarter lead after touchdowns were scored by Gary Martin on a 100-yard kickoff return and by Benny Nelson on a one-yard Benny Nelson run. A 35-yard Tim Davis field goal in the second quarter made the halftime score 17–0 in favor of the Crimson Tide. The score remained unchanged until Miami rallied with a pair of fourth-quarter touchdowns that made the final score 17–12. The first came on a nine-yard George Mira pass to Nick Spinelli and the second on a one-yard Pete Banaszak run.

=== Ole Miss ===
1964 Sugar Bowl

Team	1	2	3	4	Total
• #8 Alabama	3	6	3	0	12
#7 Ole Miss	0	0	0	7	7

- Date: January 1, 1964
- Location: Tulane Stadium
  New Orleans, LA
- Game attendance: 80,785

After their loss in the Iron Bowl on November 30, Alabama officially accepted an invitation to play the SEC champion Ole Miss Rebels for the first time since the 1944 season in a Sugar Bowl that featured a pair of SEC teams. As each team entered the game, Mississippi finished in the No. 7 position and Alabama in the No. 8 position in the final AP poll of the season. With starting quarterback Joe Namath still suspended, the Crimson Tide offense struggled, but four Tim Davis field goals proved to be enough for Alabama to win 12–7 over the Rebels.

Davis gave the Crimson Tide a 12–0 lead as then entered the fourth quarter after connecting from 31-yards in the first, 46 and 22-yards in the second and 48-yards in the third quarter. Ole Miss responded in the fourth quarter with their only points on a five-yard Perry Lee Dunn touchdown pass to Larry Smith that made the final score 12–7. For his four field goal performance, Davis was named the Sugar Bowl MVP.

== Freshman squad ==
Prior to the 1972 NCAA University Division football season, NCAA rules prohibited freshmen from participating on the varsity team, and as such many schools fielded freshmen teams. For the 1963 season, the Alabama freshmen squad was coached by Sam Bailey and finished their season with a record of three wins and one loss (3–1). After a 10–6 loss to Mississippi State to open the season, Alabama rebounded with a 3–0 victory over Tulane at Denny Stadium. Dudley Kerr scored the Tide's only points with his 29-yard field goal in the second quarter.

In their third game, the Baby Tide defeated Auburn 21–14 at Cliff Hare Stadium. Alabama took an early 6–0 lead when Wayne Trimble threw a 10-yard touchdown pass to Kent Busbee in the first quarter. They extended it to 21–0 with second-quarter touchdowns scored by John Mosely on a pair of one-yard runs. Auburn responded with a 21-yard Tom Bryan touchdown run that made the halftime score 21–7. After a scoreless third, the Tigers made the final score 21–14 after Bryan threw a 21-yard touchdown pass to Scotty Long.

Alabama then closed the season with a 17–16 victory over a previously undefeated Ole Miss freshmen team in Tuscaloosa. The Rebels' scored on their opening possession on an 18-yard Joe Graves touchdown pass to James McCraney for a 7–0 lead. After a 41-yard Jimmy Keys field goal late in the second extended the Ole Miss lead to 10–0, Graves threw a 13-yard touchdown pass to McCraney with only 0:04 remaining in the first half for a 16–0 halftime lead. Alabama rallied in the third quarter with a pair of touchdowns that cut the Rebels' lead to 16–14. The first came when Louis Thompson recovered a Graves fumble in the endzone and the second on a 48-yard Wayne Trimble pass to Kent Busbee. A game-winning, 36-yard Dudley Kerr field goal late in the fourth quarter made the final score 17–16.

== Personnel ==
=== Varsity letter winners ===
Player	Hometown	Position
Steve Allen	Athens, Alabama	Guard
Mickey Andrews	Ozark, Alabama	Halfback
Joe Elwood	Bessemer, Alabama	Tackle
Ron Bird	Covington, Kentucky	Tackle
Clark Boler	Northport, Alabama	Tackle
Steve Bowman	Pascagoula, Mississippi	Fullback
Paul Crane	Prichard, Alabama	Center
Tim Davis	Columbus, Georgia	Placekicker
Jimmy Dill	Mobile, Alabama	End
John Farner	Attalla, Alabama	Tackle
Ron Durby	Memphis, Tennessee	Tackle
Grady Elmore	Ozark, Alabama	Halfback
Mike Fracchia	Memphis, Tennessee	Fullback
Wayne Freeman	Fort Payne, Alabama	Guard
Hudson Harris	Tarrant, Alabama	Halfback
Butch Henry	Selma, Alabama	End
Jack Hurlbut	Houston, Texas	Quarterback
Dan Kearley	Talladega, Alabama	Defensive tackle
Al Lewis	Covington, Kentucky	Guard
Gary Martin	Dothan, Alabama	Halfback
Frankie McClendon	Guntersville, Alabama	Tackle
Gaylon McCollough	Enterprise, Alabama	Center
Larry McGill	Panama City, Florida	Halfback
Joe Namath	Beaver Falls, Pennsylvania	Quarterback
Benny Nelson	Huntsville, Alabama	Halfback
Ray Ogden	Jesup, Georgia	Halfback
Billy Piper	Poplar Bluff, Missouri	Halfback
Jackie Sherrill	Biloxi, Mississippi	Fullback
Jim Simmons	Piedmont, Alabama	Tackle
Steve Sloan	Cleveland, Tennessee	Quarterback
Charles Stephens	Thomasville, Alabama	End
Tommy Tolleson	Talladega, Alabama	End
Eddie Versprille	Norfolk, Virginia	Fullback
Bill Wieseman	Louisville, Kentucky	Guard
Steve Wright	Louisville, Kentucky	Tackle

=== Coaching staff ===
Name	Position	Seasons at Alabama	Alma mater
Bear Bryant	Head coach	6	Alabama (1936)
Sam Bailey	Assistant coach	6	Ouachita Baptist (1949)
Jim Blevins	Assistant coach	2	Alabama (1960)
Jim Goostree	Assistant coach	7	Tennessee (1952)
Clem Gryska	Assistant coach	4	Alabama (1948)
Dude Hennessey	Assistant coach	4	Kentucky (1955)
Pat James	Assistant coach	6	Kentucky (1951)
Carney Laslie	Assistant coach	7	Alabama (1934)
Ken Meyer	Assistant coach	1	Denison (1950)
Charley Pell	Assistant coach	1	Alabama (1962)
Hayden Riley	Assistant coach	6	Alabama (1948)
Howard Schnellenberger	Assistant coach	3	Kentucky (1956)
Jimmy Sharpe	Assistant coach	1	Alabama (1962)
Gene Stallings	Assistant coach	6	Texas A&M (1957)

== NFL/AFL draft ==
Several players that were varsity lettermen from the 1962 squad were drafted into the National Football League (NFL) and the American Football League (AFL) between the 1963 and 1965 drafts. These players included the following:

Year	Round	Overall	Player name	Position	NFL/AFL team
1964 NFL draft	5	61	Benny Nelson	Halfback	Detroit Lions
1964 NFL draft	5	69	Steve Wright	Tackle	Green Bay Packers
1964 NFL draft	11	151	Eddie Versprille	Running back	Cleveland Browns
1964 AFL draft	8	59	Steve Wright	Offensive tackle	New York Jets
1964 AFL draft	12	94	Benny Nelson	Defensive back	Houston Oilers
1965 NFL draft	1	12	Joe Namath	Quarterback	St. Louis Cardinals
1965 NFL draft	3	40	Ray Ogden	End	St. Louis Cardinals
1965 NFL draft	9	120	Frank McClendon	Tackle	Minnesota Vikings
1965 NFL draft	10	131	Gaylon McCullough	Center	Dallas Cowboys
1965 AFL draft	1	1	Joe Namath	Quarterback	New York Jets
1965 AFL draft	8	58	Ray Ogden	Tight end	Houston Oilers
1965 AFL draft	19	147	Frank McClendon	Tackle	Oakland Raiders
1966 NFL draft	11	156	Steve Sloan	Quarterback	Atlanta Falcons
1966 NFL draft	15	216	Tom Tolleson	Wide receiver	Atlanta Falcons
1966 NFL draft	15	226	Steve Bowman	Running back	New York Giants
1966 AFL draft	17	150	Tom Tolleson	Wide receiver	New York Jets
1966 AFL draft	20	179	Steve Bowman	Halfback	Oakland Raiders
