= 1963 Mississippi State Bulldogs football team =

American college football season

1963 Mississippi State Bulldogs football

Liberty Bowl champion

Liberty Bowl, W 16–12 vs. NC State
- Conference: Southeastern Conference

Ranking
- Coaches: No. 11
- Record: 7–2–2 (4–1–2 SEC)
- Head coach: Paul E. Davis (2nd season)
- Home stadium: Scott Field; Mississippi Veterans Memorial Stadium

1963 Southeastern Conference football standings
	Conf.					Overall
Team	W		L		T	W		L		T
No. 7 Ole Miss $	5	–	0	–	1	7	–	1	–	2
No. 5 Auburn	6	–	1	–	0	9	–	2	–	0
No. 8 Alabama	6	–	2	–	0	9	–	2	–	0
Mississippi State	4	–	1	–	2	7	–	2	–	2
LSU	4	–	2	–	0	7	–	4	–	0
Georgia Tech	4	–	3	–	0	7	–	3	–	0
Florida	3	–	3	–	1	6	–	3	–	1
Tennessee	3	–	5	–	0	5	–	5	–	0
Georgia	2	–	4	–	0	4	–	5	–	1
Vanderbilt	0	–	5	–	2	1	–	7	–	2
Kentucky	0	–	5	–	1	3	–	6	–	1
Tulane	0	–	6	–	1	1	–	8	–	1
$ – Conference champion; Rankings from AP Poll

The 1963 Mississippi State Bulldogs football team represented Mississippi State University during the 1963 NCAA University Division football season. Although the Bulldogs were picked to come in last in the SEC in the preseason, they finished 4–1–2 in the conference and qualified for the Liberty Bowl, the first nationally televised game in school history. The Liberty Bowl, played in 15-degree weather, was described by longtime radio broadcaster Jack Cristil as "colder than a pawnbroker's heart." Head coach Paul Davis was named SEC Coach of the Year in honor of the team's surprise success.

== Schedule ==
Date	Opponent	Site	Result	Attendance	Source
September 21	Howard (AL)*	Scott Field; Starkville, MS	W 43–0	11,000	
September 28	at Florida	Florida Field; Gainesville, FL	T 9–9	36,000	
October 5	at Tennessee	Neyland Stadium; Knoxville, TN	W 7–0	24,500	
October 12	Tulane	Mississippi Veterans Memorial Stadium; Jackson, MS	W 31–10	20,000	
October 19	Houston*	Scott Field; Starkville, MS	W 20–0	27,000	
October 26	at Memphis State*	Crump Stadium; Memphis, TN	L 10–17	31,650	
November 2	at No. 7 Alabama	Denny Stadium; Tuscaloosa, AL (rivalry)	L 19–20	43,000	
November 9	No. 5 Auburn	Mississippi Veterans Memorial Stadium; Jackson, MS	W 13–10	35,000	
November 16	LSU	Mississippi Veterans Memorial Stadium; Jackson, MS (rivalry)	W 7–6	46,500	
November 30	No. 3 Ole Miss	Scott Field; Starkville, MS (Egg Bowl)	T 10–10	35,218	
December 21	vs. NC State*	Philadelphia Municipal Stadium; Philadelphia, PA (Liberty Bowl)	W 16–12	8,309	
*Non-conference game; Rankings from AP Poll released prior to the game
