= Bob Devaney =

American football player and coach (1915–1997)

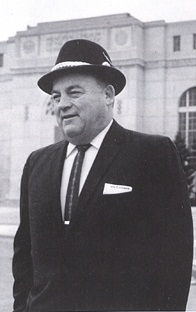
- Devaney from 1966 Cornhusker

Biographical details
- Born: April 13, 1915; Saginaw, Michigan, U.S.
- Died: May 9, 1997 (aged 82); Lincoln, Nebraska, U.S.

Playing career
- 1937–1938: Alma
- Position: End

Coaching career (HC unless noted)
- 1953–1956: Michigan State (assistant)
- 1957–1961: Wyoming
- 1962–1972: Nebraska

Administrative career (AD unless noted)
- 1967–1992: Nebraska
- 1992–1996: Nebraska (AD emeritus)

Head coaching record
- Overall: 136–30–7
- Bowls: 7–3

Accomplishments and honors

Championships
- 2 national (1970–1971); 4 Skyline (1958–1961); 8 Big Eight (1963–1966, 1969–1972)

Awards
- Eddie Robinson Coach of the Year (1971); Walter Camp Coach of the Year Award (1971); Amos Alonzo Stagg Award (1994); 3× Big Eight Coach of the Year (1962−1964)
- College Football Hall of Fame; Inducted in 1981 (profile)

Robert Simon Devaney (April 13, 1915 – May 9, 1997) was a college football coach. He served as the head coach at the University of Wyoming from 1957 to 1961 and at the University of Nebraska from 1962 to 1972, compiling a career record of 136–30–7 (.806). Devaney's Nebraska Cornhuskers won consecutive national championships in 1970 and 1971 and three consecutive Orange Bowls.

Devaney also served as the athletic director at Nebraska from 1967 to 1993, and was inducted into the College Football Hall of Fame as a coach in 1981.

== Playing and early coaching career ==
Devaney graduated from Alma College in 1939, where he played end on the football team. Devaney coached high school football in Michigan at Big Beaver, Keego Harbor, Saginaw, and Alpena, before joining the Michigan State Spartans staff as an assistant coach under Biggie Munn and continuing under Duffy Daugherty.

== Head coach ==
=== Wyoming ===
Devaney's first college head coaching job was at the University of Wyoming, where he went 35–10–5 (.750) in five seasons (1957–1961). The Cowboys won the Sun Bowl in his second season and won or shared the Skyline Conference title in his final four seasons in Laramie. Devaney was released from his contract by the university's board of trustees in February 1962, and was hired at the University of Nebraska–Lincoln at an annual salary of $17,000.

=== Nebraska ===
Devaney was the fourth choice of Nebraska's athletic director, Tippy Dye. Utah's Ray Nagel and Utah State's John Ralston had turned down the job. Michigan State coach Duffy Daugherty also turned down Dye, but recommended Devaney, his former assistant, for the Cornhuskers. When Devaney balked at leaving Wyoming for Nebraska, it was Daugherty who convinced him to accept the position because he could potentially win a national title at Nebraska, a goal that Wyoming was unlikely to attain. Devaney joined Nebraska in 1962 and immediately reestablished the program as a force in the Big Eight Conference. Prior to Devaney's arrival, Nebraska football had fallen on hard times with seven consecutive losing seasons. The 1961 team under Bill Jennings went 3–6–1 overall and 2–5 in conference. After a winning tradition up until the early 1940s, Nebraska had only three winning seasons in the two decades preceding Devaney's arrival.

Devaney engineered an immediate turnaround with a 9–2 record in 1962 that included a victory in the Gotham Bowl at Yankee Stadium over the Miami Hurricanes. It was the first of forty consecutive winning seasons for Nebraska. Devaney followed this up with an even better 10–1 season the next year, including a perfect 7–0 record in the Big Eight to claim the conference title and an Orange Bowl victory over Auburn. His success continued through 1966, with records of 9–2, 10–1, and 9–2, bringing his record at Nebraska to 47–8 (.855) in his first five seasons. This had so revived Nebraska football that Memorial Stadium was enlarged significantly by enclosing both ends. For the first time, Nebraska was on television once or twice a year and fans all over the state sat down to watch the Bob Devaney TV show each week, in which he used his folksy manner to review the tape of the game for all of the fans who hadn't seen it in person.

Consecutive 6–4 seasons followed in 1967 and 1968; allegedly known as a drinker, Devaney became subject to a whispering campaign about whether he had peaked. However, he had brought in an innovative offensive thinker as an assistant coach, Tom Osborne. Devaney and Osborne revamped the offensive scheme, an I formation with an unbalanced line, and upgraded the recruiting effort. Nebraska began the 1969 season at 2–2 start and in its fifth game needed a last-minute comeback at home to beat a Kansas team that finished the season with only one win. But the Huskers kept winning and concluded the regular season at 8–2, then routed Georgia 45–6 in the Sun Bowl. This set the stage for the highlight of Devaney's coaching career.

==== National championships ====
The 1970 Nebraska team returned most of the key offensive starters from the previous year, and added sophomore Johnny Rodgers, an explosive punt returner and wide receiver, who won the Heisman Trophy in 1972 as a senior. Nebraska tied USC in Los Angeles early in the season and was ranked #3 going into the Orange Bowl against LSU.

A late touchdown by quarterback Jerry Tagge gave the Huskers a 17–12 victory to finish the season at 11–0–1. This secured a share of the national championship, after the other two undefeated teams in the nation, Texas and Ohio State, lost their bowl games earlier in the day. The final AP Poll, conducted after the bowl games were played, picked Nebraska as champion, while the final UPI Poll, released in early December before the bowl games, had Texas first with Nebraska third.

With most of its key players back and its defense vastly improved in 1971, Nebraska rolled through the first ten games. The top-ranked Huskers met unbeaten #2 Oklahoma in Norman on Thanksgiving Day in the Game of the Century, one of the most celebrated games in college football history. A late touchdown by tailback Jeff Kinney gave the Huskers a hard-fought 35–31 victory. When Nebraska crushed unbeaten Alabama 38–6 in the Orange Bowl to finish 13–0, the Cornhuskers were said by many to be the greatest team in college football history. In fact, the Huskers defeated the teams ranked second, third, and fourth in the final AP Poll: Oklahoma, Colorado, and Alabama.

==== Final season ====
Devaney coached one more year in 1972 and expectations were high for a third straight national title. Although a disappointing loss to UCLA at the Los Angeles Memorial Coliseum opened the season, the Huskers finished with a 9–2–1 record. The loss to UCLA ended Nebraska's 32-game unbeaten streak, which dated back nearly three years to October 11, 1969, when they lost at Missouri. Although the Cornhuskers tied Iowa State and lost by three points to Oklahoma in Lincoln in November, the season ended with a 40–6 victory over Notre Dame in the Orange Bowl, the Huskers' third consecutive victory in that bowl game. Nebraska finished the 1972 season ranked #4 in the AP Poll. In addition, Johnny Rodgers was selected as the winner of the Heisman Trophy. The UPI Coaches' Poll, released before the bowls, had Nebraska at #9.

Following the 1972 season, Devaney stepped down as head coach at age 57 and hired his protégé to succeed him, offensive coordinator Tom Osborne. Devaney's overall record at Nebraska was 101–20–2 (.829) in 11 seasons, with nine bowl appearances and two national championships. His teams won or shared eight Big Eight Conference titles. His record in his final three seasons was 32–2–2 (.919), and his career college head coaching record at Wyoming and Nebraska was 136–30–7 (.806) in 16 seasons.

== Nebraska athletic director ==
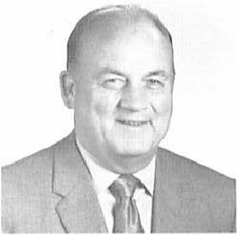
Devaney as Nebraska's athletic director, c. 1977

Devaney served as athletic director at Nebraska from 1967 to 1992 and as athletic director emeritus until 1996. The university's volleyball/wrestling/gymnastics arena, the Bob Devaney Sports Center, is named for him.

== Death ==
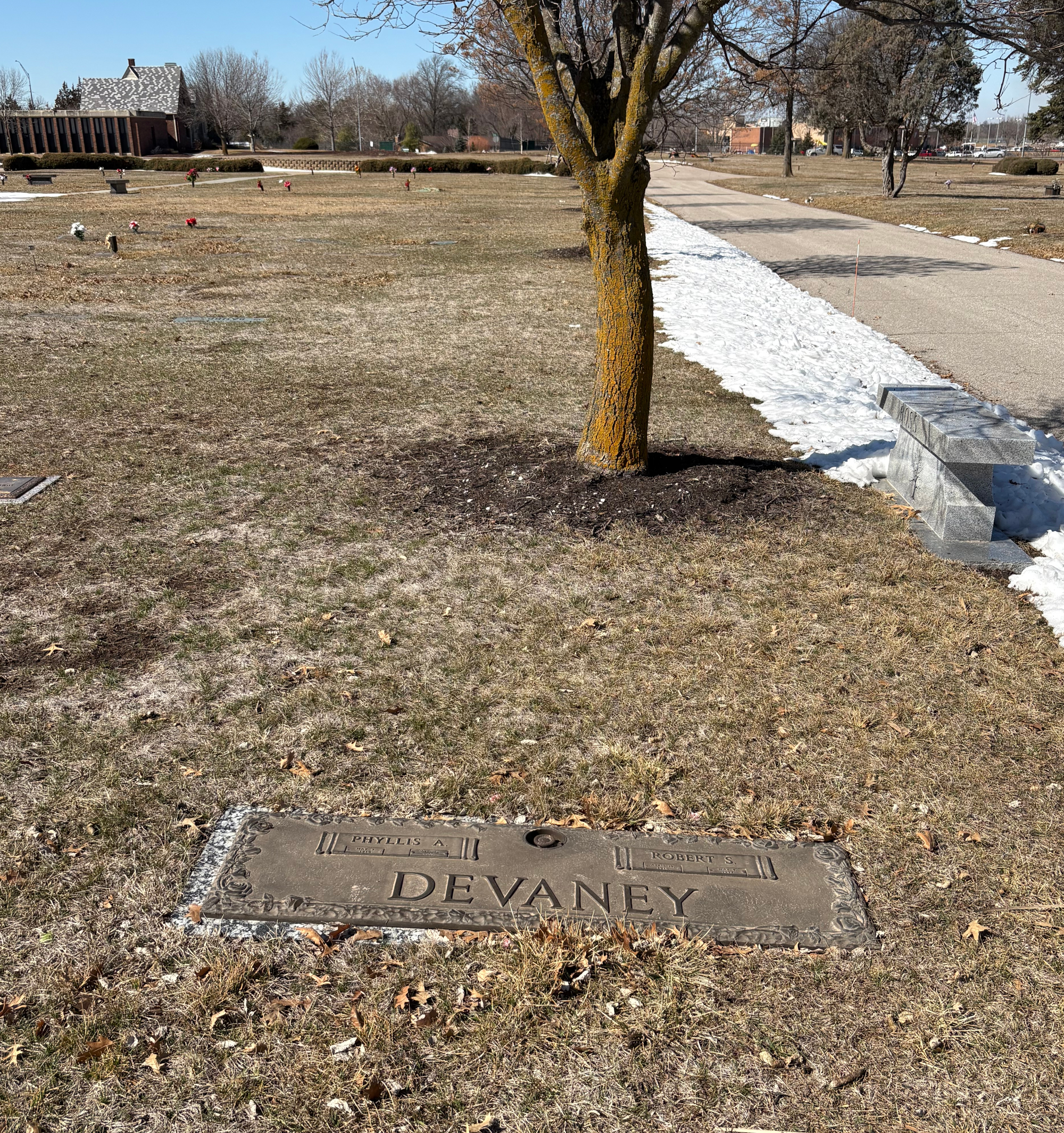
Devaney's grave at Lincoln Memorial Park

Devaney died of a heart attack at age 82 in 1997, and is buried at Lincoln Memorial Park in Lincoln.

== Head coaching record ==
=== College ===
Year	Team	Overall	Conference	Standing	Bowl/playoffs	Coaches^{#}	AP^{°}
Wyoming Cowboys (Skyline Conference) (1957–1961)
1957	Wyoming	4–3–3	3–2–2	4th			
1958	Wyoming	8–3	6–1	1st	W Sun		
1959	Wyoming	9–1	7–0	1st			16
1960	Wyoming	8–2	6–1	T–1st			
1961	Wyoming	6–1–2	5–0–1	T–1st		17	
Wyoming:		35–10–5	27–4–3				
Nebraska Cornhuskers (Big Eight Conference) (1962–1972)
1962	Nebraska	9–2	5–2	3rd	W Gotham		
1963	Nebraska	10–1	7–0	1st	W Orange	5	6
1964	Nebraska	9–2	6–1	1st	L Cotton	6	6
1965	Nebraska	10–1	7–0	1st	L Orange	3	5
1966	Nebraska	9–2	6–1	1st	L Sugar	7	6
1967	Nebraska	6–4	3–4	5th			
1968	Nebraska	6–4	3–4	T–4th			
1969	Nebraska	9–2	6–1	T–1st	W Sun	12	11
1970	Nebraska	11–0–1	7–0	1st	W Orange	3	1
1971	Nebraska	13–0	7–0	1st	W Orange	1	1
1972	Nebraska	9–2–1	5–1–1	1st	W Orange	9	4
Nebraska:		101–20–2	62–14–1				
Total:		136–30–7					
National championship Conference title Conference division title or championship game berth
^{#}Rankings from final Coaches Poll.; ^{°}Rankings from final AP Poll.

== Coaching tree ==
Assistant coaches under Devaney who have become college or professional head coaches:

- Lloyd Eaton: Wyoming (1962–1970)
- Tom Osborne: Nebraska (1973–1997)
- Carl Selmer: Miami (FL) (1975–1976)
- Warren Powers: Washington State (1977), Missouri (1978–1984)
- Jim Walden: Washington State (1978–1986), Iowa State (1987–1994)
- Monte Kiffin: NC State (1980–1982)
