= 1963 Auburn Tigers football team =

American college football season

1963 Auburn Tigers football

Orange Bowl, L 7–13 vs. Nebraska
- Conference: Southeastern Conference

Ranking
- Coaches: No. 6
- AP: No. 5
- Record: 9–2 (6–1 SEC)
- Head coach: Ralph Jordan (13th season)
- Home stadium: Cliff Hare Stadium

1963 Southeastern Conference football standings
| | Conf. | | | | | Overall |
| Team | W | | L | | T | W | | L | | T |
|---|---|---|---|---|---|---|---|---|---|---|
| No. 7 Ole Miss $ | 5 | – | 0 | – | 1 | 7 | – | 1 | – | 2 |
| No. 5 Auburn | 6 | – | 1 | – | 0 | 9 | – | 2 | – | 0 |
| No. 8 Alabama | 6 | – | 2 | – | 0 | 9 | – | 2 | – | 0 |
| Mississippi State | 4 | – | 1 | – | 2 | 7 | – | 2 | – | 2 |
| LSU | 4 | – | 2 | – | 0 | 7 | – | 4 | – | 0 |
| Georgia Tech | 4 | – | 3 | – | 0 | 7 | – | 3 | – | 0 |
| Florida | 3 | – | 3 | – | 1 | 6 | – | 3 | – | 1 |
| Tennessee | 3 | – | 5 | – | 0 | 5 | – | 5 | – | 0 |
| Georgia | 2 | – | 4 | – | 0 | 4 | – | 5 | – | 1 |
| Vanderbilt | 0 | – | 5 | – | 2 | 1 | – | 7 | – | 2 |
| Kentucky | 0 | – | 5 | – | 1 | 3 | – | 6 | – | 1 |
| Tulane | 0 | – | 6 | – | 1 | 1 | – | 8 | – | 1 |
$ – Conference champion; Rankings from AP Poll

The 1963 Auburn Tigers football team represented Auburn University in the 1963 NCAA University Division football season. It was the Tigers' 72nd overall and 30th season as a member of the Southeastern Conference (SEC). The team was led by head coach Ralph "Shug" Jordan, in his 13th year, and played their home games at Cliff Hare Stadium in Auburn, Alabama. They finished with a record of nine wins and two losses (9–2 overall, 6–1 in the SEC).

== Schedule ==
| Date | Opponent | Rank | Site | Result | Attendance | Source |
|---|---|---|---|---|---|---|
| September 21 | at Houston* | | Rice Stadium; Houston, TX | W 21–14 | 30,000 | |
| September 28 | at Tennessee | | Neyland Stadium; Knoxville, TN (rivalry) | W 23–19 | 35,000 | |
| October 5 | Kentucky | | Cliff Hare Stadium; Auburn, AL | W 14–13 | 30,126 | |
| October 12 | Chattanooga* | | Cliff Hare Stadium; Auburn, AL | W 28–0 | 25,000 | |
| October 19 | at No. 8 Georgia Tech | | Grant Field; Atlanta, GA (rivalry) | W 29–21 | 53,091 | |
| November 2 | Florida^{†} | No. 5 | Cliff Hare Stadium; Auburn, AL (rivalry) | W 19–0 | 47,000 | |
| November 9 | at Mississippi State | No. 5 | Mississippi Veterans Memorial Stadium; Jackson, MS | L 10–13 | 35,000 | |
| November 16 | at Georgia | No. 9 | Sanford Stadium; Athens, GA (rivalry) | W 14–0 | 50,000 | |
| November 23 | Florida State* | No. 9 | Cliff Hare Stadium; Auburn, AL | W 21–15 | 28,000 | |
| November 30 | vs. No. 6 Alabama | No. 9 | Legion Field; Birmingham, AL (Iron Bowl) | W 10–8 | 54,152 | |
| January 1, 1964 | vs. No. 6 Nebraska* | No. 5 | Miami Orange Bowl; Miami, FL (Orange Bowl) | L 7–13 | 72,647 | |
*Non-conference game; ^{†}Homecoming; Rankings from AP Poll released prior to the game

== Roster ==
- QB Jimmy Sidle
