= 1963 NCAA University Division football rankings =

- Season: 1963
- Bowl season: 1963–64 bowl games
- Preseason No. 1: USC
- End of season champions: Texas

Two human polls comprised the 1963 NCAA University Division football rankings. Unlike most sports, college football's governing body, the NCAA, does not bestow a national championship, instead that title is bestowed by one or more different polling agencies. There are two main weekly polls that begin in the preseason—the AP Poll and the Coaches Poll.

== Legend ==
	Increase in ranking
	Decrease in ranking
	Not ranked previous week
	National champion
(#–#)	Win–loss record
(Italics)	Number of first place votes
т	Tied with team above or below also with this symbol

== AP Poll ==
The final AP Poll was released on December 9, at the end of the 1963 regular season, weeks before the bowls. (The season had been extended due to postponements after the assassination of President Kennedy.)
The poll ranked only the top ten teams from 1962 through 1967.

	Preseason Aug	Week 1 Sep 23	Week 2 Sep 30	Week 3 Oct 7	Week 4 Oct 14	Week 5 Oct 21	Week 6 Oct 28	Week 7 Nov 4	Week 8 Nov 11	Week 9 Nov 18	Week 10 Nov 25	Week 11 Dec 2	Week 12 (Final) Dec 9	
1.	USC (34)	USC (1–0) (23)	Oklahoma (2–0) (36)	Oklahoma (2–0) (40)	Texas (4–0) (51)	Texas (5–0) (50)	Texas (6–0) (49)	Texas (7–0) (45)	Texas (8–0) (48)	Texas (9–0) (45)	Texas (9–0) (20)	Texas (10–0) (42)	Texas (10–0) (34)	1.
2.	Ole Miss (9)	Alabama (1–0) (16)	Alabama (2–0) (9)	Texas (3–0) (5)	Wisconsin (3–0) (5)	Wisconsin (4–0) (3)	Illinois (4–0–1) (1)	Illinois (5–0–1) (4)	Navy (7–1) (4)	Navy (8–1) (6)	Navy (8–1) (2)	Navy (8–1) (8)	Navy (9–1) (10)	2.
3.	Alabama (5)	Oklahoma (1–0) (2)	Texas (2–0) (2)	Alabama (3–0) (4)	Pittsburgh (3–0)	Pittsburgh (4–0)	Ole Miss (4–0–1)	Ole Miss (5–0–1) (1)	Ole Miss (6–0–1)	Ole Miss (7–0–1)	Ole Miss (7–0–1)	Illinois (7–1–1)	Illinois (7–1–1)	3.
4.	Oklahoma	Texas (1–0)	Northwestern (2–0) (1) т	Navy (3–0) (3)	Ohio State (2–0–1)	Illinois (3–0–1)	Navy (5–1) (1)	Navy (6–1) (1)	Michigan State (5–1–1) (1)	Michigan State (6–1–1)	Michigan State (6–1–1)	Pittsburgh (8–1) (1)	Pittsburgh (9–1) (5)	4.
5.	Texas	Navy (1–0) (3)	Wisconsin (2–0) (1) т	Wisconsin (2–0) (1)	Ole Miss (2–0–1)	Ole Miss (3–0–1)	Auburn (5–0)	Auburn (6–0) (2)	Oklahoma (6–1)	Pittsburgh (7–1)	Pittsburgh (7–1)	Auburn (9–1)	Auburn (9–1)	5.
6.	Northwestern	Wisconsin (1–0)	Navy (2–0) (2)	Pittsburgh (3–0) (1)	Oklahoma (2–1)	Alabama (4–1)	Oklahoma (4–1)	Oklahoma (5–1)	Pittsburgh (6–1)	Oklahoma (7–1)	Alabama (7–1)	Nebraska (9–1)	Nebraska (9–1)	6.
7.	Wisconsin	Northwestern (1–0) (5)	Georgia Tech (2–0) (2)	USC (2–1)	Illinois (2–0–1)	Oklahoma (3–1)	Alabama (5–1)	Alabama (6–1)	Alabama (6–1)	Alabama (7–1)	Nebraska (9–1)	Ole Miss (7–0–2)	Ole Miss (7–0–2)	7.
8.	Arkansas	Arkansas (1–0)	USC (1–1)	Ohio State (2–0)	Georgia Tech (3–1)	Auburn (5–0)	Wisconsin (4–1)	Pittsburgh (5–1)	Illinois (5–1–1)	Illinois (6–1–1)	Illinois (6–1–1)	Oklahoma (8–2)	Alabama (8–2)	8.
9.	Navy	Georgia Tech (1–0)	Pittsburgh (2–0)	Penn State (3–0)	Alabama (3–1)	Northwestern (4–1)	Ohio State (3–1–1)	Michigan State (4–1–1)	Auburn (6–1)	Auburn (7–1)	Auburn (8–1)	Alabama (7–2)	Michigan State (6–2–1)	9.
10.	Ohio State т; Washington т	Pittsburgh (1–0) (2)	Ole Miss (1–0–1)	Ole Miss (2–0–1)	Navy (3–1) т; Northwestern (3–1) т	Navy (4–1)	Pittsburgh (4–1)	Ohio State (4–1–1)	Nebraska (7–1)	Nebraska (8–1)	Oklahoma (7–2)	Michigan State (6–2–1)	Oklahoma (8–2)	10.
	Preseason Aug	Week 1 Sep 23	Week 2 Sep 30	Week 3 Oct 7	Week 4 Oct 14	Week 5 Oct 21	Week 6 Oct 28	Week 7 Nov 4	Week 8 Nov 11	Week 9 Nov 18	Week 10 Nov 25	Week 11 Dec 2	Week 12 (Final) Dec 9	
		Dropped: Ole Miss; Ohio State; Washington	Dropped: Arkansas	Dropped: Georgia Tech; Northwestern	Dropped: Penn State; USC	Dropped: Georgia Tech; Ohio State	Dropped: Northwestern	Dropped: Wisconsin	Dropped: Ohio State	None	None	None	None	

== Final Coaches Poll ==
The final UPI Coaches Poll was released prior to the bowl games, on December 3.
Texas received 31 of the 35 first-place votes and Navy received the other four.

Ranking	Team	Conference	Bowl
1	Texas	Southwest	Won Cotton, 28–6
2	Navy	Independent	Lost Cotton, 6–28
3	Pittsburgh	Independent	none
4	Illinois	Big Ten	Won Rose, 17–7
5	Nebraska	Big Eight	Won Orange, 13–7
6	Auburn	SEC	Lost Orange, 7–13
7	Mississippi	SEC	Lost Sugar, 7–12
8	Oklahoma	Big Eight	none
9	Alabama	SEC	Won Sugar, 12–7
10	Michigan State	Big Ten	none
11	Mississippi State	SEC	Won Liberty, 16–12
12	Syracuse	Independent	none
13	Arizona State	WAC	none
14	Memphis State	Independent	none
15	Washington	AAWU	Lost Rose, 7–17
16	Penn State	Independent	none
16	USC	AAWU	none
16	Missouri	Big Eight	none
19	North Carolina	ACC	Won Gator, 35–0
20	Baylor	Southwest	Won Bluebonnet, 14–7

- Prior to the 1975 season, the Big Ten and AAWU (later Pac-8) conferences allowed only one postseason participant each, for the Rose Bowl.
- The Ivy League has prohibited its members from participating in postseason football since the league was officially formed in 1954.

== Litkenhous Ratings ==
The following teams were ranked as the top 25 teams in the final Litkenhous Ratings, released in December 1963:

1. Texas
2. Ole Miss
3. Navy
4. Illinois
5. Pittsburgh
6. Michigan State
7. Auburn
8. Alabama
9. Syracuse
10. USC
11. Nebraska
12. Baylor
13. Georgia Tech
14. Oklahoma
15. Arkansas
16. Air Force
17. Mississippi State
18. Washington
19. Michigan
20. Northwestern
21. Ohio State
22. Oregon
23. LSU
25. Missouri
25. Rice
