= Chris Hanburger =

American football player (born 1941)

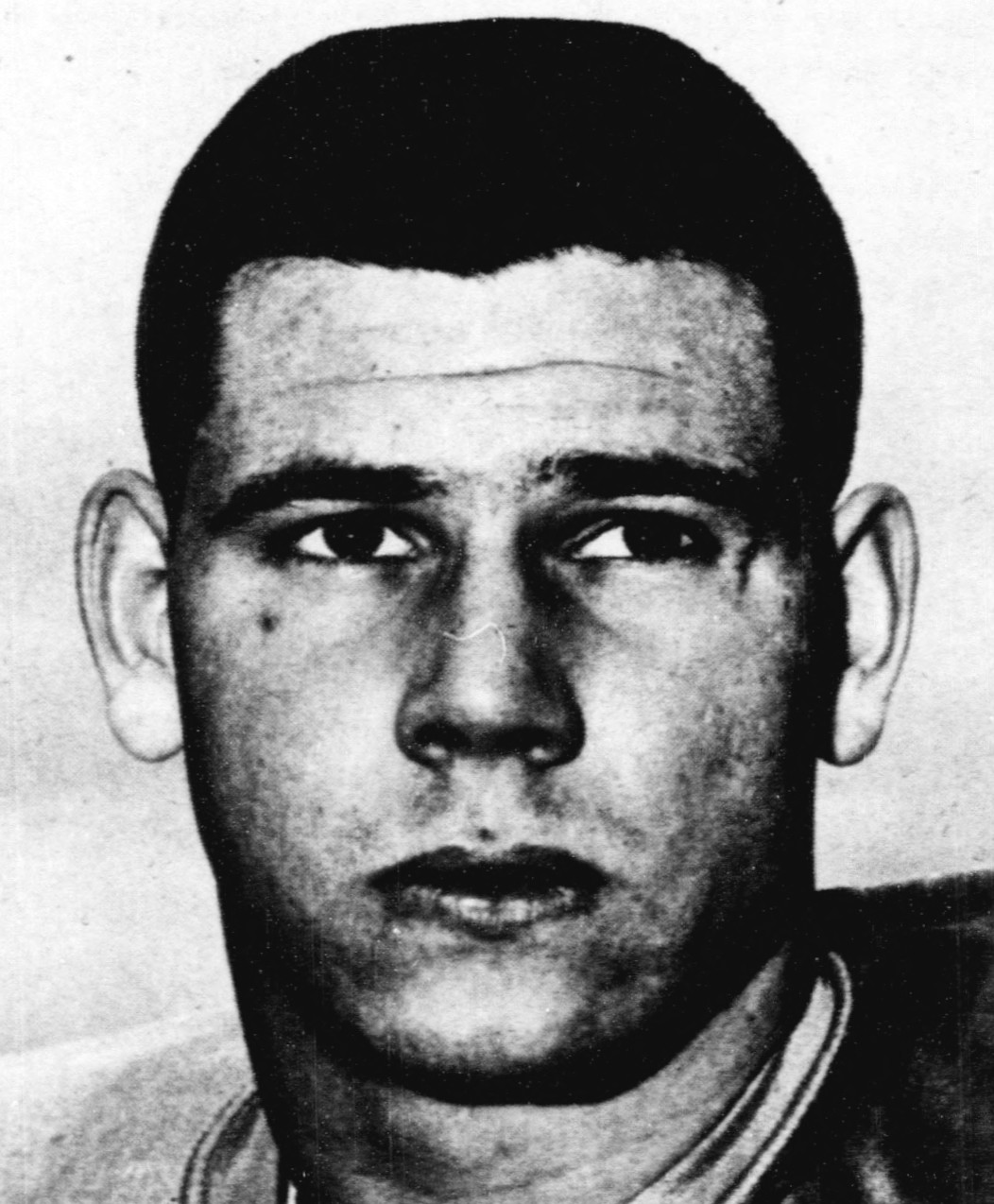
- Hanburger, circa 1966

No. 55
- Position: Linebacker

Personal information
- Born: August 13, 1941 (age 85); Fort Bragg, North Carolina, U.S.
- Listed height: 6 ft 2 in (1.88 m)
- Listed weight: 218 lb (99 kg)

Career information
- High school: Hampton (Hampton, Virginia)
- College: North Carolina (1962–1964)
- NFL draft: 1965: 18th round, 245th overall pick

Career history
- Washington Redskins (1965–1978)

Awards and highlights
- 5× First-team All-Pro (1969, 1972, 1973, 1975, 1976); Second-team All-Pro (1974); 9× Pro Bowl (1966–1969, 1972–1976); 80 Greatest Redskins; Washington Commanders Ring of Fame; 2× First-team All-ACC (1963, 1964)

Career NFL statistics
- Games played: 187
- Interceptions: 19
- Touchdowns: 5
- Stats at Pro Football Reference
- Pro Football Hall of Fame

Christian G. Hanburger Jr. (born August 13, 1941) is an American former professional football player who was a linebacker in the National Football League (NFL). He played his entire 14-year career with the Washington Redskins, from 1965 through 1978, and was elected to the Pro Football Hall of Fame in 2011.

== Early life ==
Hanburger was born on August 13, 1941, in Fort Bragg, North Carolina. His father was a colonel in the U.S. Army. He attended Hampton High School in Hampton, Virginia, where he was an All-State end. Hanburger enlisted in the Army eleven days after finishing high school, as he did not see himself going to college and did not wish to move to Alaska where his father had been re-stationed. He served two years. He had planned to pursue a career as an officer, but a serious eye-socket injury during a flag football game derailed that plan.

== College football ==
After his military service, Hanburger accepted a scholarship from the University of North Carolina in Chapel Hill, where he played college football for the Tar Heels, under coach Jim Hickey. From 1962 through 1964, Hanburger played on offense at center, and on defense as a middle linebacker where he called defensive signals. He was All-Atlantic Coast Conference (ACC) at center as both a junior and senior. He was voted the Tar Heels top all-time center.

In 1963, the Tar Heels won the Gator Bowl 35–0 over Air Force, and a shared ACC Championship with North Carolina State. From 1962 to 1964 as a center, Hanburger blocked for running back Ken Willard who rushed for nearly 2,000 yards over those three years, and would go on to a ten-year career in the NFL after being taken with the second overall pick in the 1965 NFL draft.

In 1963, he received the James H. Tatum Memorial Award from the University of North Carolina's student legislature, being noted as an outstanding defender and a team leader.

== Professional career ==
“He was at that time the smartest player in the league. We did everything we could to try to eliminate him from the play. We knew if we didn't neutralize him, then we had less of a chance of winning.”
John Hannah

Hanburger was selected by the Redskins in the 18th round (245th overall) of the 1965 NFL draft. During his first training camp, he was encouraged by future Pro Football Hall of Fame linebacker Sam Huff, that he could make the team. By the sixth game of his rookie season he became a starter, and started four other games that year. By the following year, he was a full-time starter. He played the 1969 season under coaching legend Vince Lombardi, who died before the following season began. Future Hall of Fame coach George Allen took over in 1971 and led the team, and Hanburger, through 1977.

As a professional, he was considered one of the best outside linebackers of his era and was elected to the Pro Bowl nine times during his career, the most in Washington Redskin history. Hanburger earned the nickname "The Hangman" due to his penchant for clotheslining tackles. From 1973 to 1977, he called the Redskins' defensive signals and acted as the defensive quarterback for head coach George Allen. Hanburger not only called defensive plays, but had over 100 audibles from which he could reset the defense before a play began. From his Army days, he was also nicknamed "The General".

Hanburger was a four-time first-team All-Pro. In 1972-73, the Associated Press (AP), Newspaper Enterprise Association (NEA) and Pro Football Weekly named him first-team All-Pro. In 1975, the AP named him first-team All-Pro, and the NEA and Professional Football Writers of America (FW) named him to their second team. In 1976, the NEA named him first-team All-Pro. The AP, NEA and United Press International (UPI) named him second-team All-Pro in 1969, as did the AP, NEA and FW in 1974. Additionally, he was either a Pro Bowler (1966-69, 1972-76) or an All-Conference selection every year from 1966 through 1976 with the exception of 1971—receiving post-season honors in 10 of 11 seasons in that span.

From 1971 to 1972, he and Jack Pardee, outside linebacker on the opposite side, formed a particularly effective tandem. Pardee had played for coach Allen in Los Angeles from 1966-70, before rejoining Allen in Washington for the 1971-72 seasons. When Pardee retired after the 1972 season, Hanburger took over as quarterback of Washington's defense.

In 1972, Hanburger was named the NFC Defensive Player of the Year by the Kansas City Committee of 101. He was third in the AP voting for Defensive Player of the Year, behind Joe Greene and Nick Buoniconti. During the regular season, Hanburger had four interceptions (one returned for a touchdown), two fumble recoveries, and 3.5 quarterback sacks. That year, the Redskins won the NFC championship game of the NFL playoffs against the defending champion Dallas Cowboys, 26–3. Washington limited the Cowboys to 3 points, 96 rushing yards, and 73 net passing yards with Roger Staubach at quarterback, Hanburger getting a sack. Though their defense allowed only 14 points and 69 net passing yards, the Redskins lost Super Bowl VII to the undefeated Miami Dolphins.

Beginning with the 1968 season, Hanburger started 135 straight games, a streak that ended in 1977 after he underwent an appendicitis operation. Coach Allen described Hanburger's ensuing inability to play as the loss of the team's general. In the Redskins' season finale of that season, he recorded three sacks against the Los Angeles Rams in a 17–14 win. He played in 1978 to finish his 14-year career, all with Washington. In his career, he picked off 19 passes, recovered 17 fumbles, recorded 46 sacks and scored five touchdowns, two on interception returns and three from fumble recoveries.

== Legacy and honors ==
Hanburger is a member of Washington's Ring of Fame, and has been named one of the 80 greatest Redskins players. In 2004, he was named to the Professional Football Researchers Association Hall of Very Good in the association's second HOVG class.

On August 25, 2010, Hanburger was nominated as a senior candidate for the Pro Football Hall of Fame Class of 2011 along with former Rams linebacker and kicker Les Richter. On February 5, 2011, Hanburger was officially inducted at the enshrinement ceremony where his bust, sculpted by Scott Myers, was unveiled.

== Personal life ==
After retiring, Hanburger owned an auto dealership.
