= North Carolina Tar Heels football =

College Football Bowl Subdivision team; member of Atlantic Coast Conference

2026 North Carolina Tar Heels football team
- First season: 1888; 138 years ago
- Athletic director: Steve Newmark
- Head coach: Bill Belichick; 2nd season, 9–13 (.409)
- Location: Chapel Hill, North Carolina
- Stadium: Kenan Stadium (capacity: 50,500)
- Field: Chris Smith Field
- NCAA division: Division I FBS
- Conference: ACC (since 1953)
- Division: Coastal (2005–2019, 2021–2022)
- Colors: Carolina blue and white
- All-time record: 743–580–54 (.559)
- Bowl record: 15–22 (.405)

Conference championships
- SoCon: 1922, 1946, 1949 ACC: 1963, 1971, 1972, 1977, 1980

Division championships
- ACC Coastal: 2015, 2022
- Consensus All-Americans: 15
- Rivalries: NC State (rivalry); Duke (rivalry); Virginia (rivalry); Wake Forest (rivalry); South Carolina (rivalry)

Uniforms
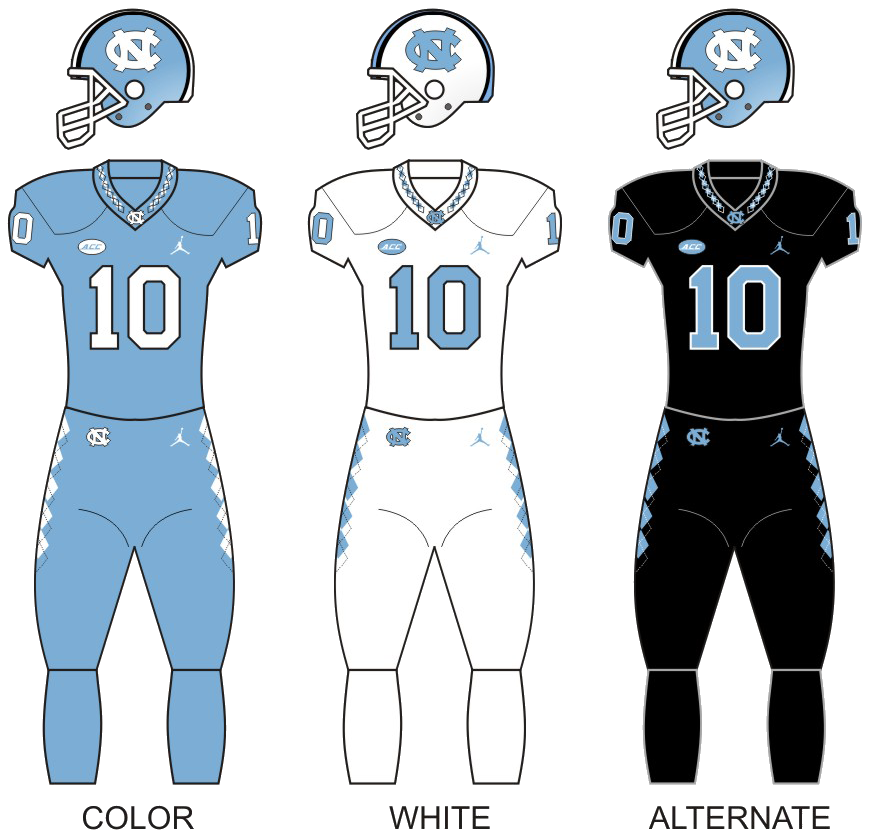
- Fight song: I'm a Tar Heel Born
- Mascot: Rameses
- Marching band: The Marching Tar Heels
- Outfitter: Jordan Brand
- Website: goheels.com

The North Carolina Tar Heels football team (often known as the "Tar Heels", "North Carolina" or simply "Carolina") represents the University of North Carolina at Chapel Hill (UNC) in the sport of American football. They are members of the Atlantic Coast Conference (ACC) and compete in the NCAA Division I Football Bowl Subdivision (FBS).

North Carolina has played in 37 bowl games in its history, winning three Southern Conference championships and five Atlantic Coast Conference titles. Thirty Tar Heel players have been honored as first-team All-Americans. Carolina had 32 All-Southern Conference selections when it played in that league until 1952 and since joining the ACC in 1953, has had 174 first-team All-ACC choices. Since joining the Atlantic Coast Conference in 1953, the team has won five conference championships, with the most recent title coming in 1980.

One of the first uses of the forward pass occurred in an 1895 Carolina game against the Georgia Bulldogs. This was one of the play's first uses prior to its legalization in 1906. The team uses "I'm a Tar Heel Born" as its official fight song and Rameses as its mascot. Carolina football's fiercest and most important rivalry is with the NC State Wolfpack. Their rivalry with the Virginia Cavaliers, referred to as the "South's Oldest Rivalry", is also significant.

The Carolina football program has had intermittent success and has featured a number of players who have gone on to play in the National Football League, including Lawrence Taylor, Charlie Justice, Chris Hanburger, Ken Willard, Don McCauley, William Fuller, Harris Barton, Jeff Saturday, Alge Crumpler, Willie Parker, Greg Ellis, Dré Bly, Julius Peppers, Hakeem Nicks, T.J. Yates, Mitch Trubisky, Sam Howell, Javonte Williams, Josh Downs and Drake Maye.

== History ==
=== Early history (1888–1958) ===
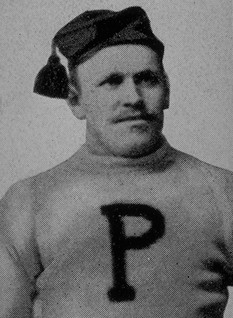
Hector Cowan, UNC's first head football coach

The University of North Carolina fielded its first football team in 1888. The Tar Heels played four games with a final record of 1–3. The team captains for the 1888 season were Bob Bingham and Steve Bragaw. The game against Wake Forest was the first in the state, and the first against Trinity the first "scientific" game in the state. Ergo, one or the other is the first intercollegiate game in North Carolina.

Between the first two games played in 1888 and next two games played in 1889 Princeton star Hector Cowan traveled south and trained the team. At the beginning of 1889, UNC played two games with a final record of 1–1. The team captains for the 1889 season were Lacy Little and Steve Bragaw.

The 1892 team saw the first instance of the South's Oldest Rivalry, losing once and winning once against Virginia. The team's center was Pete Murphy, and its captain was halfback Michael Hoke. The team also included David Kirkpatrick, James Crawford Biggs, and William Augustus Devin.

==== SIAA ====
UNC was a founding member of the Southern Intercollegiate Athletic Association (SIAA). The 1895 team was coached by Thomas Trenchard and went undefeated, going 3–0–1 on a 6-day road trip. The game against Georgia featured the first forward pass (legal or otherwise), missed by the referee, from Joel Whitaker to George Stephens.

William A. Reynolds coached the Tar Heels for four seasons. From 1897 to 1900, Reynolds posted a 27–7–4 record before departing the Tar Heels to coach Georgia. In 1897, Carolina played ten games with a final record of 7–3. The team captain for the 1897 season was Arthur Belden.

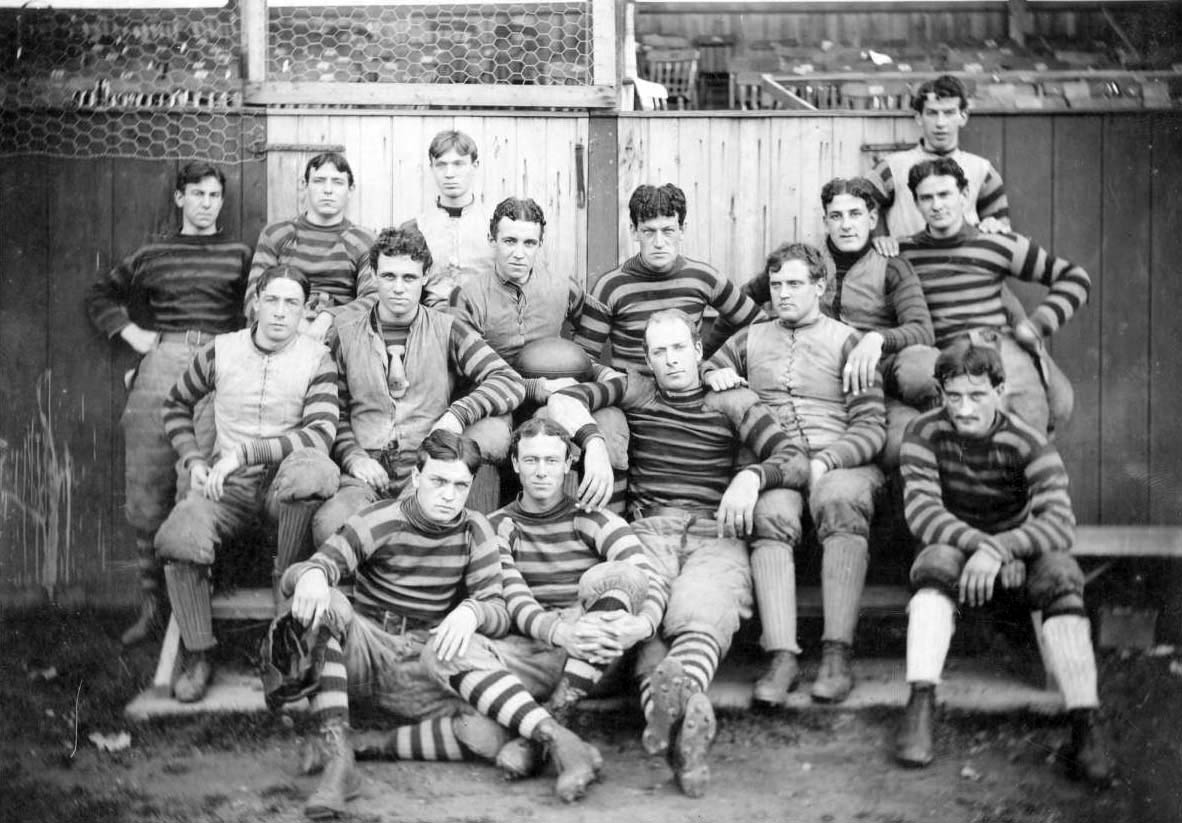
UNC football team of the 1890s

In 1898, the Tar Heels posted an undefeated record of 9–0. The team captain was quarterback Frank O. Rogers, and the team claimed a Southern championship. After beating Davidson 11–0, UNC traveled to Macon, Georgia to take on Georgia. the Tar Heels blew out the Georgia Bulldogs 53–0. Tick Tichenor wrote "Such a crush defeat as Georgia sustained at the hands of North Carolina today is almost unparalleled in football". After defeating John Heisman's Auburn Tigers 29–0, UNC beat rival Virginia 6–2, its first win since the first year of the South's Oldest Rivalry. The safety was made just as time called, and Howell scored for UNC. Halfback Jim MacRae was later mayor of Chapel Hill, North Carolina.

In 1899, UNC played eleven games with a final record of 7–3–1. The team captain for the 1899 season was Samuel Shull. The 1899 team played the closest game against SIAA champion Sewanee, utilizing Herman Koehler's leaping.

In 1900, Carolina played eight games with a final record of 4–1–3. The team captain for the 1900 season was Frank M. Osborne. Frank Bennett was captain of the 1901 team, the last UNC team in the SIAA.

==== After SIAA ====
Herman Olcott was the head coach for the Tar Heels for two seasons, 1902 and 1903. He compiled an 11–4–3 record. The 1905 team upset rival Virginia, led by fullback LeRoy Abernathy. The forward pass was legalized in 1906. The 1911 team went 6–1–1, coached by Branch Bocock and captained by Bob Winston.

==== SAIAA ====
In 1912 UNC joined the South Atlantic Intercollegiate Athletic Association (SAIAA). From 1913 to 1915, the Tar Heels were again coached by Trenchard, including a 10–1 1914 season. Dave Tayloe tied for the longest run of the 1915 college football season with a 90-yard sprint.

The 1916 season was the first year UNC played at Emerson Field, named after its benefactor Isaac Emerson and built on the site of the pre-existing athletic field. UNC beat Virginia, ending an 8-game win streak for UVA.

==== SoCon ====
Monk McDonald on the basketball team.

Brothers Bob and Bill Fetzer served as co-head coaches for the Tar Heels from 1921 to 1925, posting a 30–12–4 overall record. Bob would go on to serve as Carolina's first athletics director from 1923 to 1952.

The 1922 team were co-champion of the Southern Conference (SoCon), posting a 9–1 record, led at quarterback by Monk McDonald, considered the best all-around college athlete to attend the University of North Carolina. The origin story for the Rameses mascot was Bunn Hackney rubbing a ram's head prior to making a 30-yard drop kick to defeat VMI 3–0 in 1924.

Chuck Collins served as head coach for the Tar Heels for eight seasons, the longest of any coach to that time in Tar Heel history. The 1927 season was the first played at Kenan Memorial Stadium. Red Whisnant won the Norris Cup.

Collins's best season was a 9–1 record in 1929, during which Carolina defeated Wake Forest, Maryland, Georgia Tech, VPI, NC State, South Carolina, Davidson, Virginia and Duke. Guard Ray Farris was third-team All-American.

Carl Snavely, nicknamed "The Grey Fox" for his grey suits he would wear on game day, served two stints as the Tar Heels head football coach. He first came to Chapel Hill from Bucknell. He departed after the 1935 season to accept the head football coach position at Cornell.

Raymond Wolf came to Carolina from his post as TCU defensive line coach. In 1936, the Tar Heels finished with an 8–2 record. Wolf's 1937 Tar Heels finished 7–1–1. The next year saw UNC finish 6–2–1. The Tar Heels would enjoy their best season under Wolf's tutelage in 1939, finishing 8–1–1. In 1940, the Tar Heels finished 6–4. The 1941 season saw Carolina finish 3–7, which would result in Wolf's dismissal. Wolf's overall record in the six seasons he was head coach was 38–17–3, with most of his success coming with players that Snavely recruited.

Snavely returned in 1945. Snavely then departed again after the 1952 season to accept the head football coach position at Washington University. His final record at UNC was 59–35–5 and he was inducted into the College Football Hall of Fame as a coach in 1965. A proponent of the single wing offense, Snavely's teams were known as some of the quickest in the south. His 1946 and 1948 teams reached the Sugar Bowl but lost, finishing ranked No. 9 and No. 3, respectively. Those teams posted 8–2–1 and 9–1 records, respectively. Snavely's 1949 team finished 7–4, lost the Cotton Bowl and ranked No. 16 in the final polls.

==== ACC ====
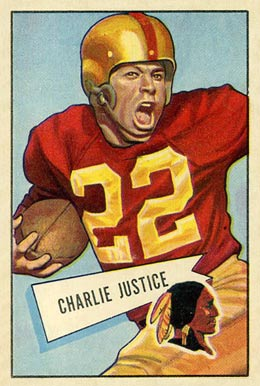
RB Charlie Justice, 1946–1949, was inducted into the CFB Hall of Fame in 1961

Jim Tatum served two stints as head football coach at his alma mater. He enlisted in the Navy for World War II and left the team but returned in 1956. His overall record at UNC is 19–17–3. George T. Barclay, another UNC alum, was promoted from assistant coach to head coach following Snavely's second departure. Barclay struggled as UNC's head football coach, posting an 11–18–1 record in his three seasons before resigning. The most notable part of Barclay's tenure is that the Tar Heels helped charter the Atlantic Coast Conference in all sports in 1953. Tatum was inducted into the College Football Hall of Fame as a coach in 1984, primarily for his tenure as head football coach at Maryland. Tatum died unexpectedly in the summer of 1958 from a rickettsial disease.

=== Jim Hickey era (1959–1966) ===
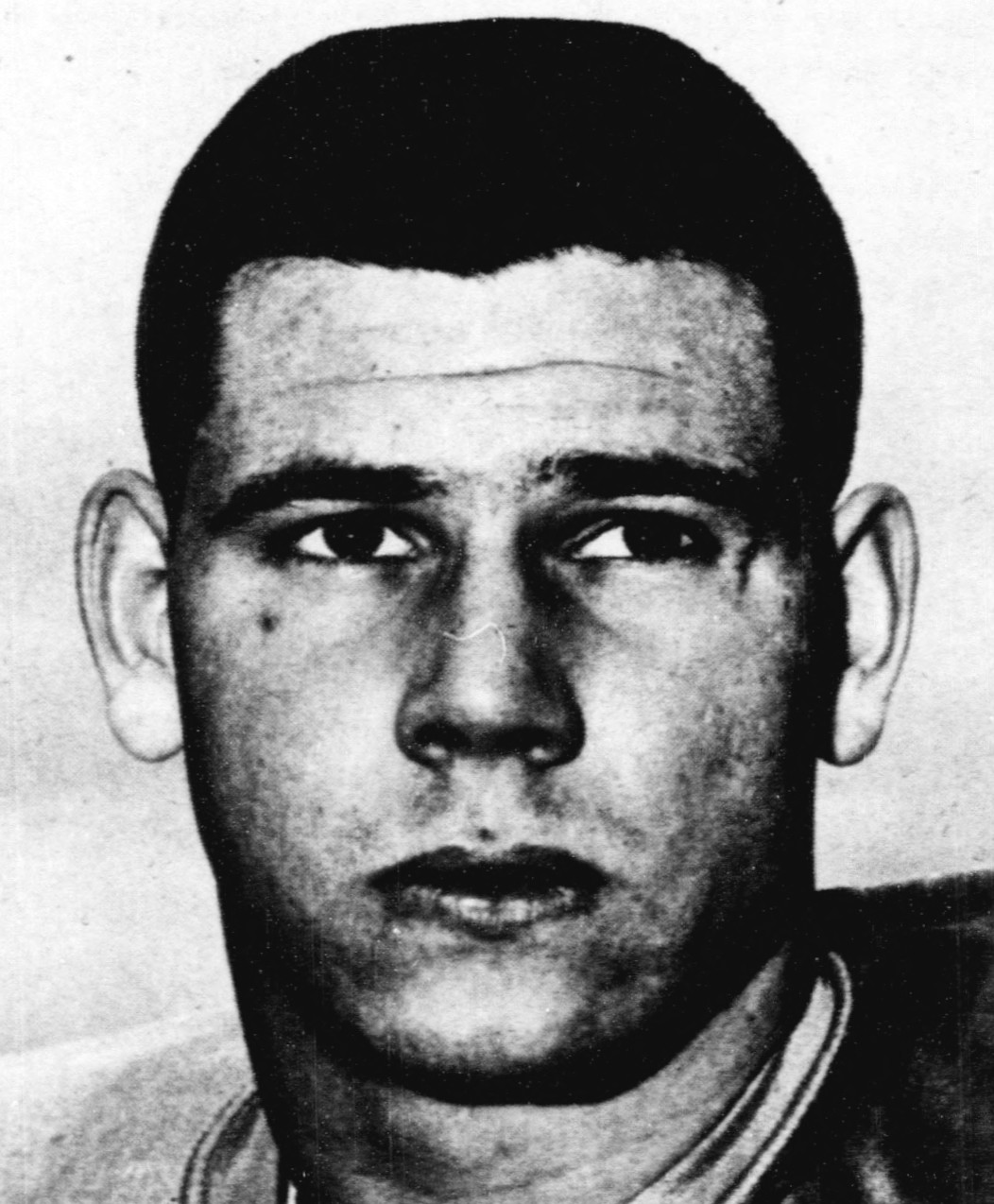
Pro Football Hall of Fame LB Chris Hanburger played at UNC from 1962 to 1964

Jim Hickey was promoted from assistant coach to head coach after Tatum's death. In Hickey's first season, the Tar Heels finished with a 5–5 record. The season began with a close loss to No. 18 Clemson and another loss to Notre Dame before Carolina defeated NC State and No. 19 South Carolina. After a loss to Maryland and Wake Forest, the Tar Heels lost to No. 20 Tennessee by a score of 29–7. Carolina then lost to Miami before shutting out both Virginia and Duke. In 1960, Carolina finished 3–7. The Tar Heels defeated Notre Dame, No. 6 Duke and Virginia and lost to NC State, Miami, Wake Forest, South Carolina, No. 11 Tennessee, Clemson and Maryland. Hickey's third season saw Carolina improve to 5–5. That year, Carolina faced two ranked teams, defeating No. 10 Maryland and losing to No. 4 LSU. In 1962, the Tar Heels finished 3–7.

Hickey’s most successful season came in 1963, when North Carolina posted a 9–2 record, captured a share of the Atlantic Coast Conference championship with NC State—marking the program’s first ACC title—won the 1963 Gator Bowl, and finished ranked No. 19 in the final Coaches’ Poll. The Tar Heels opened the season with an 11–7 victory over rival Virginia on September 21. After suffering a 31–0 shutout loss to Michigan State, Carolina rebounded with five consecutive victories, including shutout wins over Wake Forest (21–0) and South Carolina (7–0), along with victories over Maryland (14–7), NC State (31–10), and Georgia (28–7). A five-game winning streak was halted on November 9 with an 11–7 loss to Clemson, but the Tar Heels closed the regular season with three straight wins over Miami (27–16), archrival Duke (16–14), and Air Force in the Gator Bowl, a 35–0 shutout victory.

Following the 1963 season, North Carolina regressed to a 5–5 record in 1964, followed by a 4–6 mark in 1965 and another losing season in 1966. Hickey departed Chapel Hill following the 1966 season to become athletic director at the University of Connecticut. Over eight seasons as head coach, he compiled a 36–45 record at North Carolina.

=== Bill Dooley era (1967–1977) ===
Bill Dooley, brother of former Georgia head football coach Vince Dooley and uncle of former Louisiana Tech and Tennessee head football coach Derek Dooley, came to North Carolina from his post as Offensive Coordinator at Georgia. Dooley enjoyed success at UNC, compiling a 69–53–2 record in 11 seasons. Six of those seasons were bowl appearances, five losses and one win.

In 1967, the Tar Heels struggled to a 2–8 record, with wins over Maryland and Duke. In 1968, Carolina showed a little improvement, finishing 3–7 with wins over Vanderbilt, No. 7 Florida, and Duke. In 1969, Carolina finished 5–5, their best season in five years.

Dooley’s 1970 team finished 8–4 and concluded the season with a loss to No. 8 Arizona State in the 1970 Peach Bowl. The Tar Heels improved in 1971, posting a 9–3 record that included a loss to No. 6 Georgia—coached by Dooley’s older brother—in the 1971 Gator Bowl (December). Altogether, the match was also called the "Dooley Bowl". The 1971 team finished the season ranked No. 18 in the Coaches’ Poll and captured its first outright Atlantic Coast Conference (ACC) championship with a perfect 6–0 conference record.

The 1972 season marked the pinnacle of Dooley’s tenure at North Carolina. The Tar Heels finished 11–1, defeating Texas Tech in the 1972 Sun Bowl, and became the first team in school history to win 11 games in a single season. Dooley also became the only head coach in UNC football history to win back-to-back ACC championships. The Tar Heels finished the season ranked No. 14 in the Coaches’ Poll and No. 12 in the AP Poll.

North Carolina struggled in 1973, finishing 4–7 with wins over William & Mary, Kentucky, and Wake Forest. The Tar Heels rebounded in 1974 with a 7–5 record but lost to Mississippi State in the 1974 Sun Bowl. The 1975 season proved difficult, as North Carolina finished 3–7–1.

Dooley guided the Tar Heels to a 9–3 record in 1976, capped by a loss to No. 19 Kentucky in the 1976 Peach Bowl. In 1977, North Carolina swept the ACC schedule and tied Clemson, which had lost to Maryland, resulting in Dooley’s third and final ACC championship. The Tar Heels finished the season 8–3–1 and lost to No. 12 Nebraska in the 1977 Liberty Bowl. The team concluded the season ranked No. 14 in the Coaches’ Poll and No. 17 in the AP Poll.

Following the 1977 season, Dooley departed North Carolina to accept a dual role as athletics director and head football coach at Virginia Tech. He remained the winningest head coach in North Carolina football history until being surpassed by Dick Crum in 1987.

=== Dick Crum era (1978–1987) ===
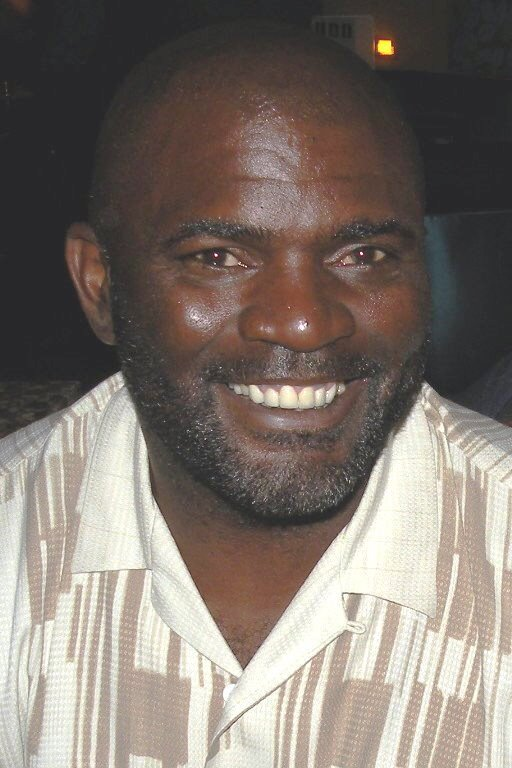
Pro Football Hall of Fame LB Lawrence Taylor played at UNC from 1977 to 1980

Dick Crum was hired away from Miami (OH) to replace Dooley. Crum brought with him a tough, rigid philosophy of an aggressive offense powered by a strong running game and a defensive scheme that emphasized ball control and fundamentals.

In his first season, Crum led the 1978 Tar Heels to a 5–6 record, which included losses to No. 18 Maryland, No. 9 Pittsburgh and No. 15 Clemson. In 1979, the Tar Heels finished 8–3–1 with a win over Michigan in the Gator Bowl to finish the season. Crum enjoyed his best season at Carolina in 1980, leading the Heels to a record of 11–1, a Bluebonnet Bowl win over Texas and an ACC Championship, Carolina's last to date.

In 1981, the Heels compiled a 10–2 record and finished the season by beating Arkansas in the Gator Bowl. That would be Carolina's last season of double digit wins for 13 years. The next two seasons saw Carolina finish 8–4. After the 1982 season, Carolina upset Texas in the Sun Bowl. The 1979-1982 Carolina teams were the first in the ACC to go to 4 consecutive bowl games, winning all 4. In 1983, they would lose to Florida State in the Peach Bowl.

In 1984, Carolina would finish 5–5–1. They would post another five-win campaign the next year, along with six losses. Carolina would go 7–4–1 with an Aloha Bowl loss to Arizona to end the season in 1986, but Carolina would finish 5–6 in 1987, increasing the unhappiness fans and administration had slowly built over the past few years of mediocrity and inconsistency.

Crum resigned as head coach of the Tar Heels after ten seasons amid mounting pressure. During his tenure, he led North Carolina to four bowl victories in six bowl appearances. Crum departed as the winningest head coach in Carolina football history, compiling a 72–41–3 record, a mark that stood until Mack Brown surpassed it in 2019.

Notable players coached by Crum at North Carolina include Pro Football Hall of Famer Lawrence Taylor, along with Harris Barton, Kelvin Bryant, Amos Lawrence, Donnell Thompson, Darrell Nicholson, Buddy Curry, Steve Streater, and Reuben Davis.

=== Mack Brown's first tenure (1988–1997) ===
Mack Brown was hired away from Tulane as Crum's replacement. He was the Tar Heel head coach for ten seasons. Brown's first two teams finished with identical 1–10 records, the worst two seasons that the Tar Heels have suffered on the field in modern times. However, the next two years saw a relatively quick return to respectability. In 1990, the Tar Heels finished 6–4–1. By comparison, the Tar Heels had won only seven games in the previous three years. Included in the 1990 total was a tie of Georgia Tech that proved to be the Yellow Jackets' only non-win that season en route to a share of the national championship. In 1991, the Tar Heels finished 7–4, narrowly missing a bowl bid.

Everything came together for the Tar Heels in 1992. They finished 8–3 in the regular season, good enough for second in the Atlantic Coast Conference, and capped the season with a victory over Mississippi State in the Peach Bowl, they finished the season at 9–3. The Peach Bowl was the program's first bowl appearance since 1986, first bowl win since 1982, and first appearance in a final Top 25 poll since 1982. That season was the start of UNC's most successful period since the Charlie Justice era in the late 1940s. Brown coached the Tar Heels to five consecutive bowl games, including UNC's only two New Year's Day bowl games in more than half a century (or three, if one counts the 1992–93 Peach Bowl, which was played the day after New Year's to avoid a conflict with the Sugar Bowl). The Tar Heels were ranked in the AP Top 25 every week from October 1992 through the start of the 1995 season. They finished in the final rankings in four out of five years, including two straight appearances in the top 10. Carolina won 10 regular-season games in 1993, only the third time the Tar Heels accomplished the feat, with the only losses coming to No. 1 Florida State, No. 21 Virginia in the regular season and No. 18 Alabama in the Gator Bowl.

In 1994, Brown led the Tar Heels to an 8–4 record with a loss to Texas in the Sun Bowl to cap the year. UNC lost to No. 3 Florida State, No. 25 Virginia, and No. 24 Clemson. Brown's seventh season in 1995 saw the Tar Heels finish 7–5 with a victory over Arkansas in the Carquest Bowl to finish the season. In 1996 and 1997, the Tar Heels finished with 10 and 11 wins, respectively. Brown would leave North Carolina in 1997 for the head coaching position at Texas. Largely due to Florida State joining the league in 1992 and their dominance over the college landscape in the 1990s, Brown was unable to win an ACC title in his first tenure despite leading the team during one of its most prolonged stretches of football success.

Brown's tenure was also known for the rise in popularity in the Tar Heel football program that, while respectable in its own right, was overshadowed by the Tar Heel's national powerhouse men's basketball program. Games at Kenan Memorial Stadium were almost always sold out, highlighted by the 62,000 that showed to watch the Tar Heels' "Judgement Day" game against Florida State in 1997, the largest crowd at a regular season college football game in the history of the state of North Carolina. Brown also led an effort that resulted in the upgrading of UNC's football facilities and the expansion of Kenan Memorial Stadium. Notable players who played for Brown in his first stint at North Carolina include Jeff Saturday, Greg Ellis and Dré Bly.

=== Carl Torbush era (1998–2000) ===
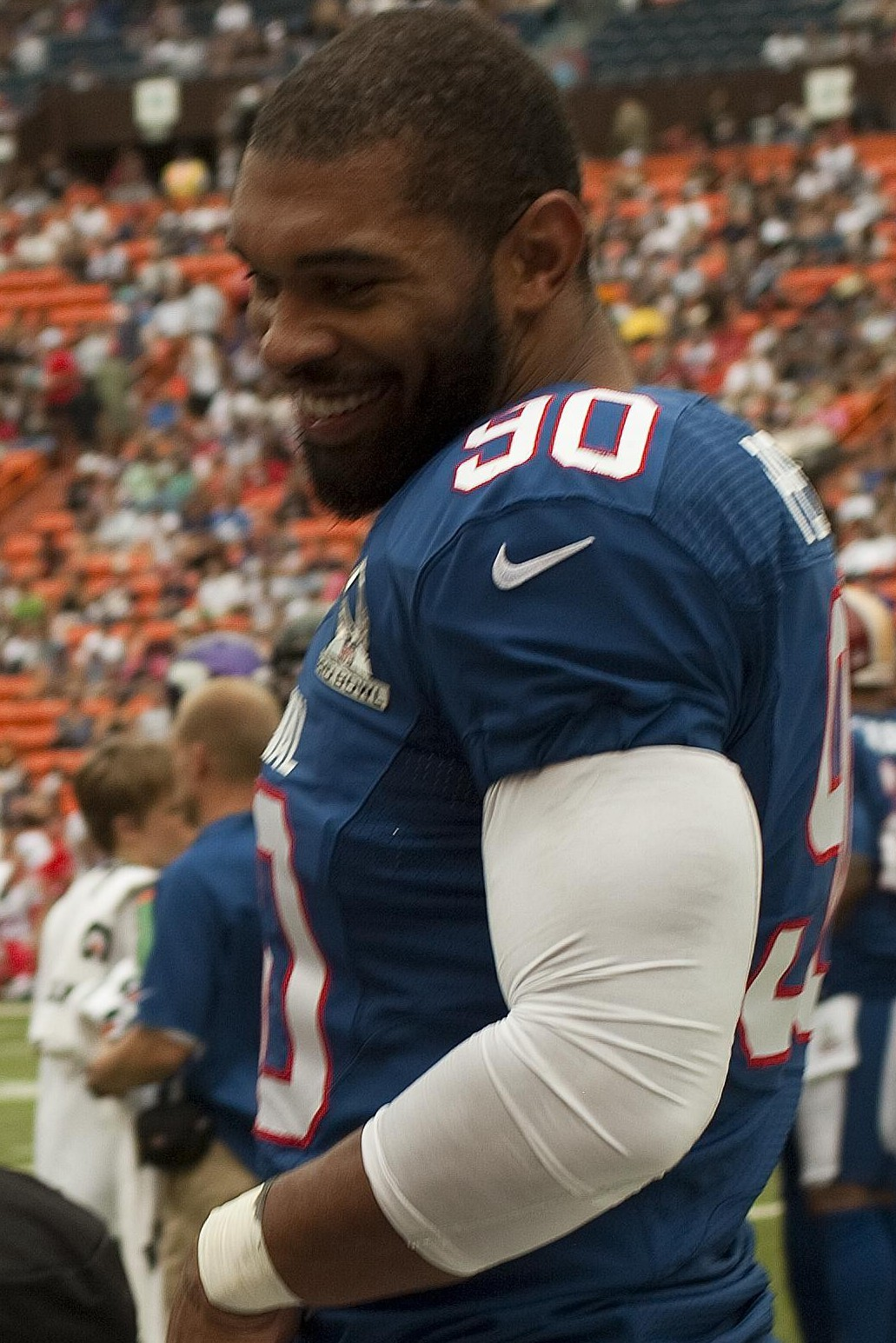
Pro Football Hall of Fame DE Julius Peppers played at UNC from 1998 to 2001

Carl Torbush was promoted from defensive coordinator to head coach of the UNC Tar Heels football program following Brown's departure. Torbush's hiring was praised by many UNC fans and alums, who felt Torbush's performance as defensive coordinator was superb and that an in-program hire was the best way to maintain the momentum generated by Mack Brown.

Despite the loss of most of the team's defensive stars of the last three years, the Tar Heels were expected to pick up right where they left off in 1998. However, they never really recovered from an unexpected loss to Miami (Ohio) to open the 1998 season, during which Carolina went 6-5 and barely managed to qualify for a bowl appearance. Torbush led the Tar Heels to the Las Vegas Bowl, where they defeated San Diego State by a score of 20–13. The next year was an unmitigated disaster. The team was riddled with injuries, the most devastating one occurring when quarterback Ronald Curry tore his Achilles tendon. The Tar Heels were so thin at quarterback that they were forced to convert safety Antwon Black to quarterback, but he was lost after two games to mononucleosis. After starting the season 1–1, the Tar Heels didn't win another game until beating North Carolina State in November. They finished 3–8, UNC's first losing season since Mack Brown's two consecutive 1–10 seasons in 1988 and 1989. School officials actually planned to fire him after the season, but an outpouring of support from players and fans led to a change of heart. He was, however, forced to fire several members of his staff, including offensive coordinator Steve Marshall, who had been criticized for being too conservative in his play calling.

The Tar Heels rebounded to finish 6–5 in 2000, but it wasn't enough to save Torbush's job; he was fired at the end of the season. Torbush left Carolina with a record of 17–18. Notable players who played for Torbush at UNC are Julius Peppers, Alge Crumpler and Jeff Reed.

=== John Bunting era (2001–2006) ===
John Bunting was hired by his alma mater as the Tar Heels head coach after the firing of Torbush despite no FBS coaching experience of any kind, assistant coaching or head coaching.

In his first season, Bunting led the Tar Heels to an 8–5 record, which included a win over Florida State 41–9. It was the Tar Heels' first win over a team ranked in the top 10 of a major media poll; the Seminoles were ranked sixth in the AP Poll at the time. They closed the season with a victory over Auburn in the 2001 Peach Bowl. However, his teams since were highly inconsistent. In 2002, Bunting's Tar Heels finished 3–9. That was followed by a 2–10 campaign in 2003. In 2004, the Tar Heels finished 6–6. UNC defeated Miami 31–28 on a last-second field goal by Connor Barth during the 2004 season; the Hurricanes were ranked fourth at the time in the AP poll. The Tar Heels capped the 2004 season with a loss in the Continental Tire Bowl to Boston College by a score of 37–24.

In 2005, North Carolina finished 5–6. The team was routed during the 2005 season 69–14 by Louisville, one of the worst losses in modern Tar Heel history. During his final season (2006), his team had a record of 3–9, while averaging over 23 fewer points per game than their opponents.

Bunting was fired by UNC athletics director Dick Baddour on October 22, 2006. He was allowed to finish out the 2006 season. Bunting's last home victory on November 18, 2006, against NC State, broke a seven-game losing streak, and he was able to close out his career one week later with a 45–44 win over Duke. Bunting compiled an overall record of 27–45 over six seasons.

=== Butch Davis era (2007–2010) ===
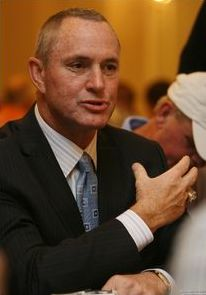
Coach Davis

Former Cleveland Browns and Miami head football coach Butch Davis was hired as the Tar Heels 32nd head football coach in late 2006. Davis was a big-name coach whose hiring was praised nationwide. Davis originally signed a seven-year deal worth approximately $1.86 million per season, with a base salary of $286,000. Additionally, he received $25,000 a year in expenses and a supplement from the Educational Foundation (Ram's Club) that ranged from $1 million in 2007 to $1.3 million in 2013. Davis took over a program that had seen three winning seasons in the past eight years and had won more than six games in a season two other times.

During his first season as head coach, the 2007 Tar Heels finished 4–8, with six losses coming by a touchdown or less. Despite a losing record in 2007, North Carolina fans averaged over 57,000 fans in Kenan Stadium during the season, the highest average attendance since the first Mack Brown era. The 2007 match-up against South Carolina saw a crowd of 61,000, the second-largest in school history. During the season, suspicion mounted that Davis would leave UNC after his first year if the head coaching job at his alma mater, Arkansas, opened up. The rumors grew louder when Houston Nutt was forced to resign at Arkansas, but Davis denied he was leaving. On November 21, 2007, Davis agreed to a one-year contract extension, along with a raise of about $291,000 annually. Davis said in a statement that one year at UNC convinced him that this was where he wanted to be, and that he intended to have "a long and successful career in Chapel Hill." Athletics director Dick Baddour said he could not release all the details of the contract until it was approved by the school's board of trustees, but did say the base salary would rise $29,000, the expenses would go up $5,000, and Davis’ supplemental income would go up $100,000.

The 2008 Tar Heels were expected to be much improved from the previous year, with most outlets picking them to finish second in the Coastal Division. In their second game of the season they routed Rutgers on the road 44–12. This was their first victory outside the state of North Carolina since 2002. On October 4, the Heels defeated then 24th-ranked UConn 38–12 for their first victory over a ranked non-conference opponent in 11 years. As a result, the Tar Heels were ranked 22nd in the weekly Associated Press rankings, their first appearance in a major poll in seven years. The following Saturday, the Tar Heels defeated the Notre Dame Fighting Irish, their first regular-season win as a ranked team in 11 years. A 16–13 overtime loss at Virginia on October 18 briefly knocked the Heels out of the rankings, but after a 45–24 victory over Boston College on October 25, the team became bowl-eligible for the first time since 2004. The win also resulted in the team being ranked in the Bowl Championship Series rankings for the first time since the BCS began in 1998. A week later, they defeated Georgia Tech to clinch their first winning season since 2001, and only their fourth since Brown left the school after the 1997 season. The Tar Heels lost three of their last four games, including a loss in the 2008 Meineke Car Care Bowl to West Virginia.

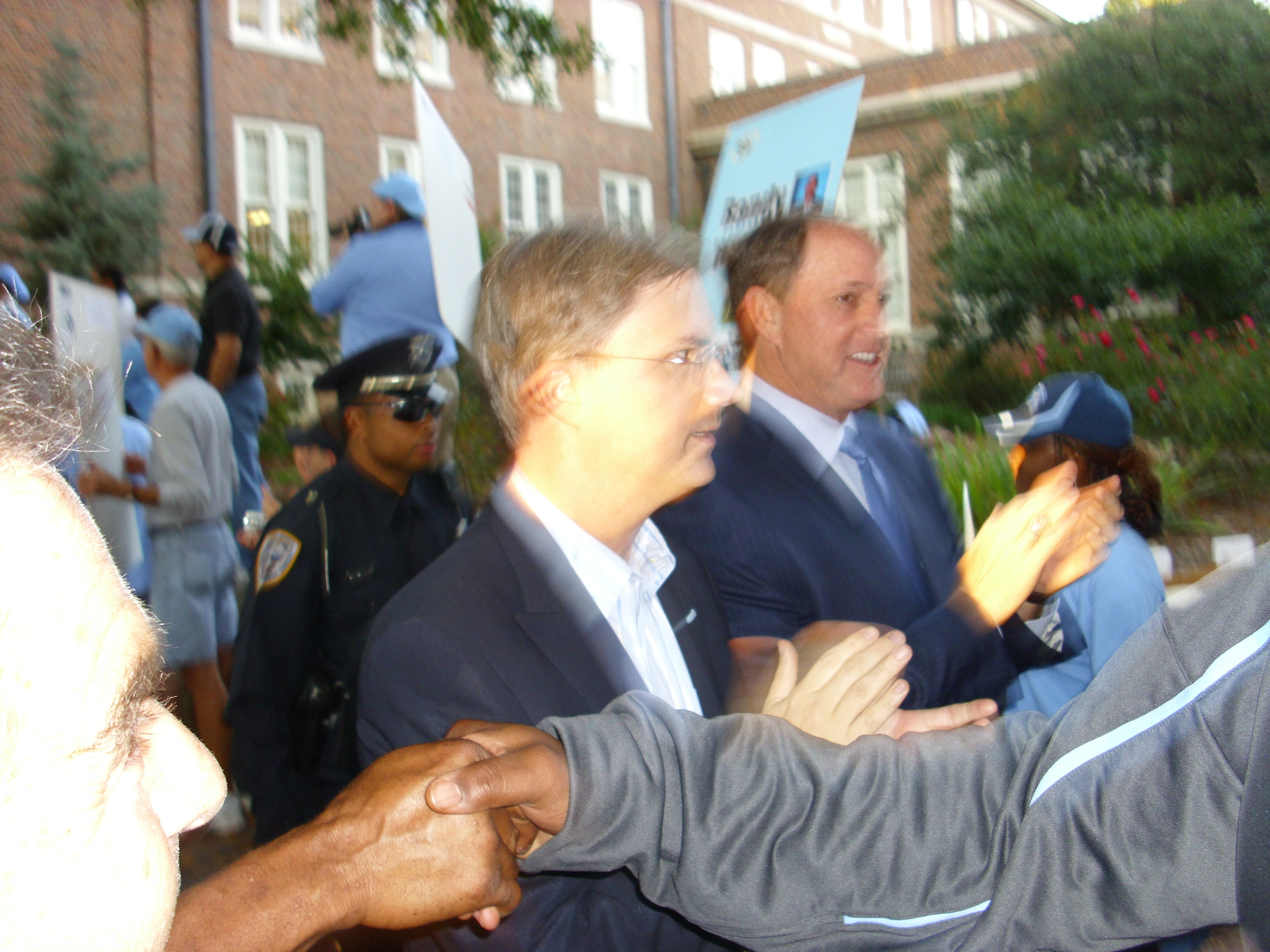
Davis coming through campus before UNC's game against Florida State in 2009

Davis led the 2009 Tar Heels to another 8–4 regular season record and a second straight bowl appearance, the first time since the 1997–1998 seasons that UNC had made consecutive bowls. UNC faced the Pittsburgh Panthers in the 2009 Meineke Car Care Bowl and lost the Meineke-sponsored bowl game for the second straight year, finishing the season 8–5. Additionally, Davis led Carolina football to its 6th consecutive year of graduating more than 75% of its football players. The America Football Coaches Association recognized fewer than 30 public universities for superior graduation rates that year, with UNC the only such institution in the state of North Carolina and the Atlantic Coast Conference.

Despite fallout from the unfolding scandal, Davis' Tar Heels finished the regular season with a 7–5 record, earning a trip to the Music City Bowl against Tennessee. The 2010 Tar Heels won their first game since 1981 at rival Virginia's Scott Stadium and gained their first ever win in FSU's Doak Campbell Stadium. The Tar Heels won the Music City Bowl in controversial fashion, 30–27, in what would be Davis' final game as Tar Heel head coach.

==== NCAA Scandal ====
In July 2010, the NCAA began investigating violations involving improper benefits provided by agents to current players at UNC. In September 2010, the NCAA opened a second prong of its investigation, this time involving possible improper tutor involvement with UNC student-athletes. In response to the investigation, local and national sports columnists called for Davis' termination, but some North Carolina fans still supported the coach.

Thirteen UNC football players were suspended for the team's season opener in Atlanta against LSU, and the Tar Heels lost the game 30–24. Ultimately, wide receiver Greg Little, defensive tackle Marvin Austin, and defensive end Robert Quinn were ruled permanently ineligible after it was discovered they improperly accepted gifts from sports agents. Five other players were found guilty of accepting improper benefits and/or inappropriate academic assistance. The football scandal would later unfold into a university-wide probe into student-athlete academics, also investigated by the NCAA.

In July 2011, Davis was fired by UNC chancellor Holden Thorp amid the NCAA investigation . Davis left Carolina after compiling a 28–23 record. Thorp said the move was necessary to restore confidence in UNC's integrity. On September 19, 2011, in response to an NCAA notice of allegations, Davis was never mentioned in the NCAA inquiry and had no reported involvement in the investigation. North Carolina subsequently vacated all of its wins from the 2008 and 2009 seasons after retroactively declaring Austin, Quinn and Little ineligible. As a result, these are "officially" North Carolina's only winless seasons in the modern era.

=== Everett Withers era (2011) ===
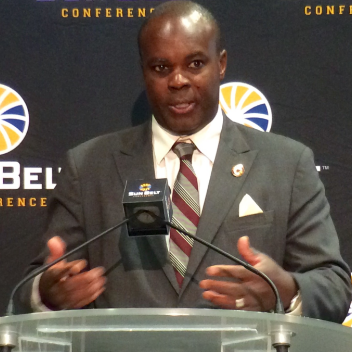
Coach Withers

Following Davis' dismissal a month before the 2011 season was to start, defensive coordinator Everett Withers was named interim coach. Withers was the first African American head coach in Tar Heel football history.

With Withers leading the Tar Heels, UNC beat their first opponent, FCS school James Madison by a score of 42–10. In the game, quarterback Bryn Renner set the single game school record for completion percentage at 95.7%. Also during the season, running back Giovani Bernard became the first Tar Heel rusher in 27 years to rush for over 100 yards in five straight games. The Tar Heels lost their rivalry matchup with NC State in Raleigh, 13–0. It was the Tar Heels' fifth straight loss to the Wolfpack, and the first shutout in the series since 1960. Bernard, however, eclipsed the 1,000 yard mark on the season against the Wolfpack. Receiver Dwight Jones later passed the 1,000 yard receiving mark for the season, making the 2011 Tar Heels the first team to have a 1,000 yard receiver and rusher in the same season. The Tar Heels closed out the regular season with a home win over rivals Duke, winning 37–21. Dwight Jones's 79 receptions and Bryn Renner's 23 TD passes set then-single season records for the Tar Heels.

Withers led the Tar Heels to a 7–6 record in his only season, capped with a loss to Missouri in the Independence Bowl.

=== Larry Fedora era (2012–2018) ===
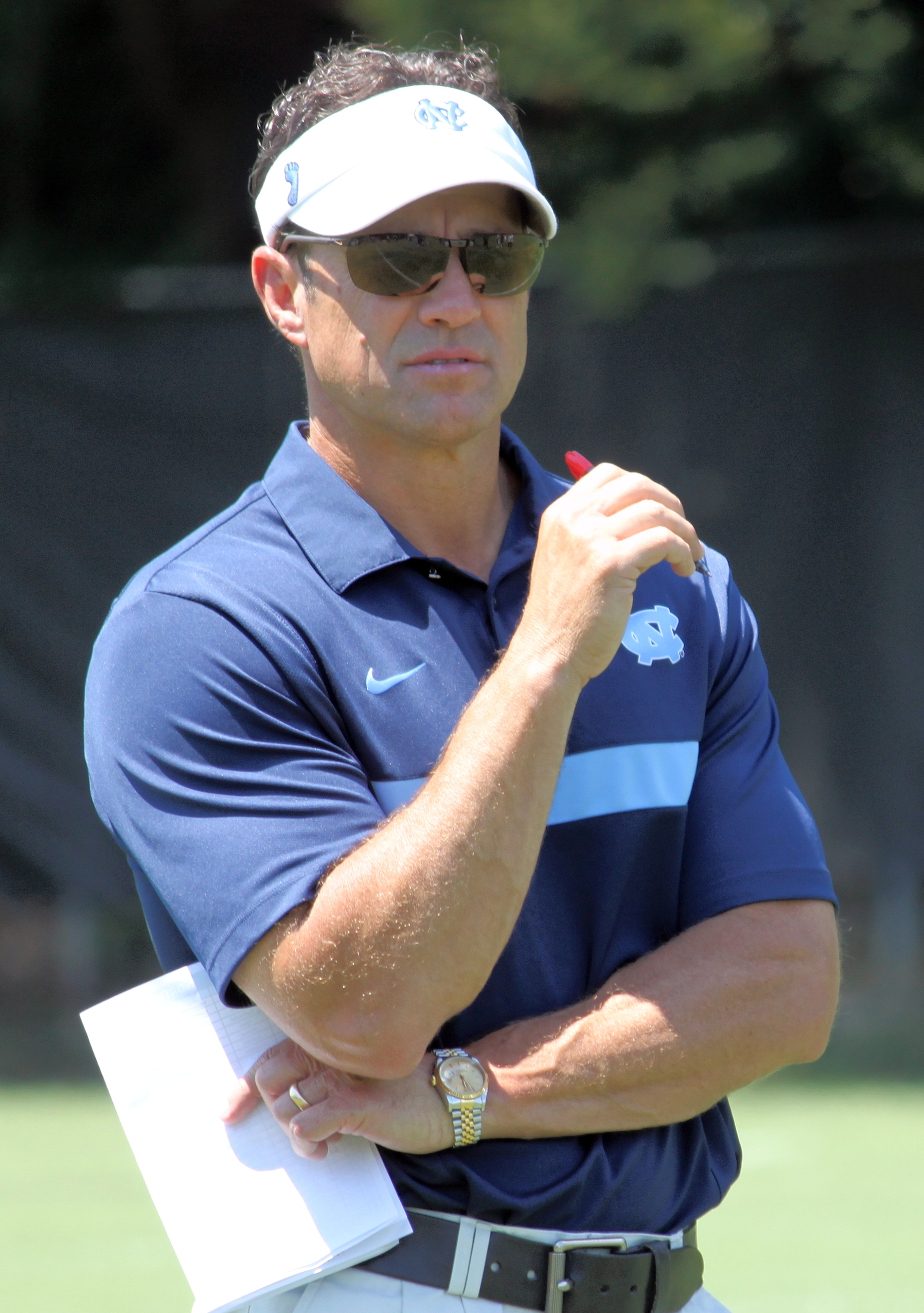
Coach Fedora

On December 9, 2011, Southern Miss head coach Larry Fedora was hired to be the next Carolina football head coach. Fedora arrived in Chapel Hill with a track record of producing explosive spread offenses. In Fedora's first year as head coach, the UNC football team was ineligible for the ACC title (due to sanctions from Davis' tenure), a bowl game and a ranking in the USA Today Coaches' Poll. Fedora led the 2012 team to an 8–4 record, which would have resulted in a division title were the Tar Heels eligible for the postseason. That record included snapping their losing streak to rivals NC State, winning in dramatic fashion after Giovani Bernard returned a punt for a touchdown late in the fourth quarter.

After starting the 2013 season 1–5, Fedora's Tar Heels rebounded to finish 5–1 in their final six regular season games to become bowl eligible at 6–6. The Tar Heels beat Cincinnati in the Belk Bowl to finish the season at 7–6. In 2014, the Tar Heels underperformed on defense, giving up over 497 yards per game (111th in the nation, and fourth-worst among Power 5 teams) en route to a 6–7 season following a loss to Rutgers in the 2014 Quick Lane Bowl. In an effort to address this, Fedora fired defensive coordinator Vic Koenning after the season and hired former Iowa State and Auburn head coach Gene Chizik as Koenning's replacement.

In 2015, Fedora led the Tar Heels to an 11–1 regular season and the team's first ACC Coastal Division championship. The team also finished with a perfect 8–0 record in conference play and were ranked as high as No. 8 in the AP and Coaches' Polls, their highest ranking since 1997. In the 2015 ACC Championship Game, the Tar Heels lost to Clemson by a score of 45–37, falling short in their comeback attempt The Tar Heels then lost in the 2015 Russell Athletic Bowl to Baylor 49–38. The Tar Heels finished the season 11–3 (8–0 ACC) and ranked 15th in the country, marking the team's first postseason Top 25 ranking since 1997. After the 2015 season, offensive coordinator Seth Littrell left Carolina to take the head coaching position at North Texas.

In 2016, Fedora led the Tar Heels to an 8–5 (5–3) record. Carolina began the season with a loss to Georgia in the Chick-fil-A Kickoff Game in Atlanta by a score of 33–24. Carolina then reeled off four straight wins, which included an upset win over No. 12 Florida State in Tallahassee by a score of 37–35 after a game-winning field goal as time expired, snapping the Seminoles' 22-game home winning streak. After losing to NC State in the regular season finale, the Tar Heels, who were led by star quarterback Mitch Trubisky, lost in the 2016 Sun Bowl to Stanford by a score of 25–23. Following the 2016 season, defensive coordinator Gene Chizik resigned to spend more time with his family.

Fedora's 2017 and 2018 teams struggled mightily. The Tar Heels were unable to find consistent offense, cycling through several starting quarterbacks including LSU transfer Brandon Harris, Chazz Surratt, Nathan Elliott, Cade Fortin, and Jace Ruder. After going 5–18 in those two seasons, Fedora was fired as head coach following the final game of the 2018 season, an overtime loss to rival N.C. State.

=== Mack Brown's return (2019–2024) ===
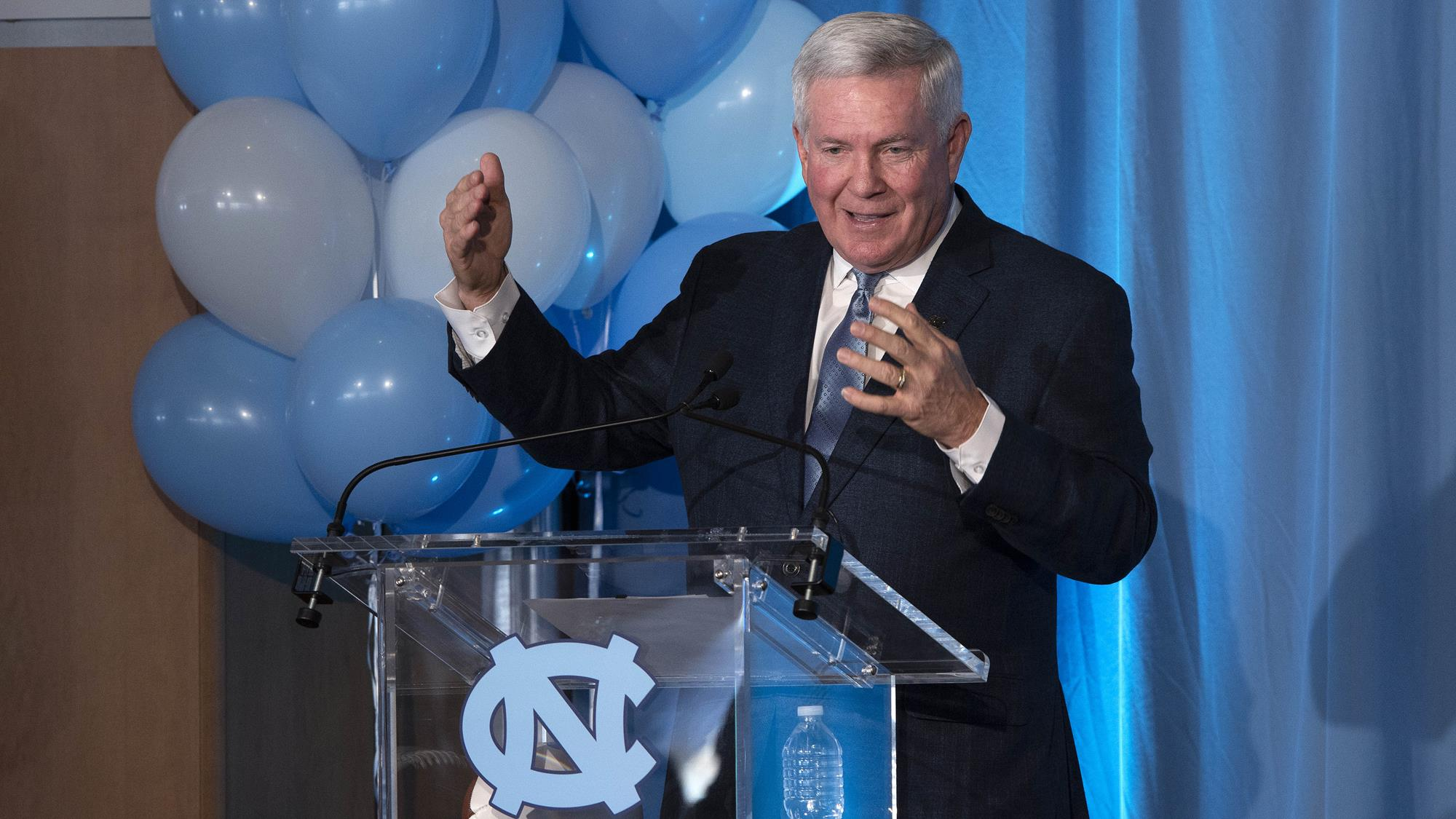
Coach Brown

Two days after firing coach Fedora, on November 27, 2018, the school announced Mack Brown would be returning as head coach. Brown had been out of coaching after stepping down as Texas head coach following the 2013 season and had been a college football studio analyst for ESPN when he was rehired by the Tar Heels. When he was rehired, Brown signed a five-year contract with UNC worth $3.5 million annually excluding incentives. Brown's return has been highlighted by a significant uptick in the level of recruiting for the Tar Heels, exemplified by the flipping of current Tar Heel star quarterback Sam Howell from Florida State on signing day for the class of 2019. Howell set multiple school records in three seasons as the starting quarterback. But despite Howell's performance and consecutive top-15 recruiting classes (2021 and 2022), the COVID-shortened 8–4 season in 2020 is so far the best record of Brown's second stint.

In Brown's first year coaching since the 2013 season at Texas, the Tar Heels finished 6-6 and became bowl eligible for the first time since the 2016 season, clinching bowl eligibility in the final week of the regular season against rival N.C. State. On October 26, 2019, in a win over Duke, he became the school's all-time wins leader, surpassing his first Tar Heel predecessor, Dick Crum. Brown led the team to their first bowl victory in 6 years, a 55–13 blowout over Temple in the Military Bowl. Under the air-raid system of offensive coordinator Phil Longo, freshman quarterback Sam Howell set the school record for passing touchdowns with 38. Howell's 38 passing scores were also a record for ACC true freshmen, and came two shy of tying Jameis Winston for most touchdown passes by a freshman in conference history. Wide receivers Dazz Newsome and Dyami Brown posted 1,000 yard receiving seasons, and running back Michael Carter rushed for 1,003 yards. His backfield counterpart Javonte Williams had a breakout season, rushing for 933 yards and five touchdowns in 2019. Former quarterback Chazz Surratt made a position change to linebacker after Howell's arrival, and earned first team all-conference honors in his first collegiate season as a linebacker. On December 15, 2019, Broan and UNC agreed to terms on a one-year contract extension.

The 2020 team finished 8–4 in a season shortened by the COVID-19 pandemic, capped by a 41–27 loss to Texas A&M in the Orange Bowl. This was Carolina's first appearance in a major bowl game since the 1950 Cotton Bowl Classic, and the first ever Orange Bowl berth for the school. Running backs Carter and Williams both rushed for over 1,000 yards in the 2020 season, and wide receiver Dyami Brown posted his second straight 1,000 yard receiving season. Howell set more records in his second season under center, including single game passing touchdowns with six in a come-from-behind victory over Wake Forest. He added a rushing touchdown in the same game, setting the record for total touchdowns in a game with seven. Against Miami in the final week of the regular season, Williams and Carter combined for an FBS-record 544 rushing yards in the 62–26 blowout of the Hurricanes. Williams' 19 rushing touchdowns on the season tied Don McCauley's single-season record at Carolina.

The 2021 team began the season ranked in the top ten in national preseason polls and was picked to win the ACC Coastal Division, but underperformed and ended the season with a 6–7 record. The Tar Heels finished fifth in the division, capping the season with a disappointing 38–21 loss to South Carolina in the Duke's Mayo Bowl. The 2021 Tar Heel team was one of only two teams in FBS history to have started the season ranked inside the top ten and finish with a losing record. A bright spot in the 2021 season was the emergence of highly touted wide receiver Josh Downs who set single season program records for receptions and receiving yards, finishing the year with 101 catches for 1,335 yards and 8 touchdowns. Running back Ty Chandler, a graduate transfer from Tennessee rushed for 1,092 yards and 13 touchdowns, making Brown's first three seasons back in Chapel Hill produce at least one 1,000 yard receiver and rusher. Following the conclusion of the season, defensive coordinator Jay Bateman and special teams coordinator Jovan Dewitt were let go, as changes needed to be made to continue the upward trajectory of Carolina football, and the defense and special teams had regressed heavily, despite returning several starters and key rotation pieces. Offensive line coach Stacy Searels, whose unit was another that struggled in 2021, also left the Tar Heels in the offseason to return to Georgia, where he had previously served as OL coach from 2007 to 2010 under head coach Mark Richt. He was replaced by Jack Bicknell Jr., who had previously worked with Tar Heel OC Phil Longo when both were at Ole Miss under head coach Matt Luke.

The 2022 team entered the season with significant question marks on both sides of the ball. Gene Chizik, Tar Heel defensive coordinator from 2015 to 2016, returned to Chapel Hill to lead the defense after spending time away from football and was tasked with improving the Tar Heels' struggling defense. The biggest question mark, ultimately, was who would replace Howell at quarterback. Redshirt-freshman Drake Maye would emerge as the man for the job, and was announced as starting quarterback prior to the season-opening game against FAMU. In his first start, Maye set multiple records in a 56–24 win. Freshman RB Omarion Hampton ran for over 100 yards against the Rattlers as well, becoming the first Tar Heel running back to eclipse the century that in his first career game since Charlie "Choo-Choo" Justice in 1946. Despite rumblings of offseason improvement, the Tar Heel defense again struggled throughout the season. In the Tar Heels' game against Appalachian State, Chizik's defense gave up 649 total offensive yards, including 361 passing yards and six touchdown passes for Mountaineer quarterback Chase Brice. However, the Tar Heel offense itself gained 567 total offensive yards, the special teams unit returned a Mountaineer onside kick attempt for a touchdown, and the Tar Heels were able to escape Boone with a 63–61 victory. The Tar Heels would then beat Georgia State on the road in Atlanta the following week to improve to 3–0 for just the third time since 2011.

Maye and star wide receiver Josh Downs would power the Tar Heel team to a 9–1 record through ten games, clinching their second, and final, ACC Coastal Division Championship following a victory against Wake Forest. After beating Wake, the 2022 Tar Heels would not win another game, finishing the season 9–5 after losing their final two regular season games, the ACC Championship against Clemson and the 2022 Holiday Bowl against Oregon. Despite the lackluster finish, quarterback Maye would win the ACC's Player, Offensive Player, and Rookie of the Year Awards and be named to the All-ACC first team. He would earn national acclaim as well, earning the Shaun Alexander Freshman of the Year Award from the Maxwell Football Club. Offensive coordinator Phil Longo, who had been a member of the coaching staff since Brown returned to UNC in 2019, left for Wisconsin after the season, and was replaced by Chip Lindsey.

On February 2, 2023, Brown and UNC agreed to terms on a one-year contract extension. Once again entering the season with high expectations, the Tar Heels got off to a hot start, defeating South Carolina 31–17 in Charlotte in the season-opener. That win against South Carolina made Mack Brown the first college football head coach in history to win 100 games with two different schools. The Tar Heel defense, which in 2022 had only gotten 17 sacks, seemed to be improved, and sacked Gamecock QB Spencer Rattler nine times in the victory. Following victories against Appalachian State, Minnesota, and Syracuse, the Tar Heels moved to 4–0 for the first time since the final season of Brown's first tenure in 1997. Wide receiver Tez Walker, who had battled the NCAA over his eligibility to play for the Tar Heels, returned against the Orange and became the top receiver, finishing the season with 699 yards on 41 receptions and seven touchdown grabs.

After ultimately going 6–0 over the first half of the season, the Tar Heels struggled in the back half of the regular season, only winning two of the remaining six games en route to an 8–4 record. Sophomore running back Omarion Hampton, who had shown potential in 2022, broke out in a massive way in Lindsey's run-focused offensive scheme, rushing for 1,442 yards on the way to a second-team All-America season. Linebacker Cedric Gray also stood out as a beacon of consistency for the once again struggle-filled Tar Heel defense. Maye concluded his stellar Tar Heel career with 24 passing touchdowns to 9 interceptions in 2023, opting out of the 2023 Duke's Mayo Bowl to pursue an NFL career.

On November 26, 2024, after initially declaring his intentions to return to UNC for the 2025 season, Mack Brown was fired as head coach after another mediocre season. Brown was permitted to coach the team's regular season finale against NC State before tight ends coach Freddie Kitchens took over as interim head coach for the 2024 Fenway Bowl, a game the Tar Heels lost to UConn by a score of 27–14.

=== Bill Belichick era (2025–present) ===
On December 11, 2024, the school announced the hiring of six-time Super Bowl champion head coach Bill Belichick to be the next North Carolina football coach. Despite never coaching college football in his nearly 50 year-long coaching career, the 72-year old Belichick is widely regarded as the greatest NFL coach of all-time. Belichick also has a personal connection to the university as his father, Steve Belichick, was an assistant coach for the Tar Heels from 1953 to 1955. When hired, Bill Belichick signed a five-year contract with the university that pays $10 million per year.

Belichick's first game ended with a loss of 48-14, marking the most points he has ever given up during his career, and UNC's worst opening loss in the program's history. The team finished with a 4-8 record and two assistant coaches were fired at the end of the season. The constant presence of Belichick's girlfriend, Jordon Hudson, on the sideline and at the team's practice facilities was cited by sports media as a distraction for the program.

== Conference affiliations ==
Since starting the football program in 1888, North Carolina has been affiliated with three conferences, along with some stints an independent in the early seasons of Carolina football.

- Independent (1888–1891, 1895–1898, 1902–1921)
- SIAA (1892–1893, part of 1894, 1899–1902)
- Southern Conference (1922–1952)
- Atlantic Coast Conference (1953–present)

UNC was independent for most of its earliest years of college football, spending many of the seasons from 1888 to 1921 as a member of no formal athletic conference. The exceptions to this include a brief stint with the informal North Carolina Inter-Collegiate Foot-ball Association from 1888 to 1890 with Duke (then known as Trinity) and Wake Forest, and a few brief stints with the more formally recognized SIAA. The conference was formed in December 1892 when eight colleges from around the South, led by Virginia, attempted to form its first iteration; this association folded by July 1893 due to internal disputes.

Carolina tried to revive the SIAA, helping reform the association in December 1894. By January 1895, however, UNC left the SIAA, calling the venture "impracticable" due to distance considerations, in addition to the cost of associated travel expenses.

UNC's Athletic Association voted to rejoin the SIAA in 1899, becoming a member before the 1900 football season. After two more seasons in the Athletic Association, from late in 1899 to May 1902, North Carolina was suspended from the SIAA for playing two players, who were reportedly professionals, in a baseball game in 1902.

== Championships ==
=== Conference championships ===
North Carolina claims eight conference championships with the most recent in 1980.

Year	Conference	Coach	Overall record	Conf. record
1922†	Southern Conference	Bob Fetzer & Bill Fetzer	9–1	5–0
1946	Southern Conference	Carl Snavely	8–2–1	4–0–1
1949	Southern Conference	Carl Snavely	7–4	5–0
1963†	Atlantic Coast Conference	Jim Hickey	9–2	6–1
1971	Atlantic Coast Conference	Bill Dooley	9–3	6–0
1972	Atlantic Coast Conference	Bill Dooley	11–1	6–0
1977	Atlantic Coast Conference	Bill Dooley	8–3–1	5–0–1
1980	Atlantic Coast Conference	Dick Crum	11–1	6–0

† Co-champions

=== Division championships ===
North Carolina won two division championships under the ACC's divisional scheduling model. Following the 2022 season, the ACC moved to a single-division format, making the Tar Heels the final Coastal Division Champions.

Year	Division	Coach	Opponent	CG result
2015	ACC Coastal	Larry Fedora	Clemson	L 37–45
2022	ACC Coastal	Mack Brown	Clemson	L 10–39

== Head coaches ==
Tenure	Coach	Years	Record	Pct.
1889	Hector Cowan	1	1–1	.500
1893	William J. "Yup" Cook	1	3–4	.429
1894	V. K. Irvine	1	6–3	.667
1895	T. C. Trenchard	1	7–1–1	.833
1896	Gordon Johnston	1	3–4–1	.438
1897–1900	W. A. Reynolds	4	27–7–4	.763
1901	Charles O. Jenkins	1	7–2	.778
1902–1903	H. S. Olcott	2	11–4–3	.694
1904	R. R. Brown	1	5–2–2	.667
1905	William Warner	1	4–3–1	.563
1906	W. S. Keinholz	1	1–4–2	.286
1907	Otis Lamson	1	4–4–1	.500
1908	Edward Green	1	3–3–3	.500
1909–1910	A. E. Brides	2	8–8	.500
1911	Branch Bocock	1	6–1–1	.813
1912	C. W. Martin	1	3–4–1	.438
1913–1915	T. C. Trenchard	3	19–8–1	.696
1916–1919	Thomas Campbell	2	9–7–1	.559
1920	M. E. Fuller	1	2–6	.250
1921–1925	Bill Fetzer	5	30–12–4	.696
1926–1933	Chuck Collins	8	38–31–9	.545
1934–1935	Carl Snavely	2	15–2–1	.833
1936–1941	Raymond Wolf	6	38–17–3	.681
1942	Jim Tatum	1	5–2–2	.667
1943	Tom Young	1	6–3	.667
1944	Gene McEver	1	1–7–1	.167
1945–1952	Carl Snavely	8	44–33–4	.568
1953–1955	George Barclay	3	11–18–1	.383
1956–1958	Jim Tatum	3	12–15–1	.429
1959–1966	Jim Hickey	8	36–45	.444
1967–1977	Bill Dooley	11	69–53–2	.565
1978–1987	Dick Crum	10	72–41–3	.634
1988–1997	Mack Brown	10	69–46–1	.599
1998–2000	Carl Torbush	3	17–18	.486
2001–2006	John Bunting	6	27–45	.375
2007–2010	Butch Davis	4	12–23	.343
2011	Everett Withers	1	7–6	.538
2012–2018	Larry Fedora	7	45–43	.511
2019–2024	Mack Brown	6	44–31	.587
2025–present	Bill Belichick	1	4-8	.333

- During the years 1888, 1889 (fall schedule), and 1891–92, North Carolina had no official head coach. Over those four seasons, the team went 6–6.
- In 1890, the North Carolina Tar Heels did not field a team.
  - On September 19, 2011, North Carolina self-imposed sanctions against its football program, including forfeiting its wins from the 2008 and 2009 seasons.
    - On March 12, 2012, The NCAA Committee on Infractions stiffened the previously self-imposed sanctions including, inter alia, vacating participation in the '08 and '09 Bowl Games.

== Bowl games ==
North Carolina has played in 39 bowl games in its history with a record of 15–24.

Date	Bowl	Opponent	Result
January 1, 1947	Sugar Bowl	Georgia	L 10–20
January 1, 1949	Sugar Bowl	Oklahoma	L 6–14
January 2, 1950	Cotton Bowl Classic	Rice	L 13–27
December 28, 1963	Gator Bowl	Air Force	W 35–0
December 30, 1970	Peach Bowl	Arizona State	L 26–48
December 31, 1971	Gator Bowl	Georgia	L 3–7
December 30, 1972	Sun Bowl	Texas Tech	W 32–28
December 28, 1974	Sun Bowl	Mississippi State	L 24–26
December 31, 1976	Peach Bowl	Kentucky	L 0–21
December 19, 1977	Liberty Bowl	Nebraska	L 17–21
December 28, 1979	Gator Bowl	Michigan	W 17–15
December 31, 1980	Bluebonnet Bowl	Texas	W 16–7
December 28, 1981	Gator Bowl	Arkansas	W 31–27
December 25, 1982	Sun Bowl	Texas	W 26–10
December 30, 1983	Peach Bowl	Florida State	L 3–28
December 27, 1986	Aloha Bowl	Arizona	L 21–30
January 2, 1993	Peach Bowl	Mississippi State	W 21–17
December 31, 1993	Gator Bowl	Alabama	L 10–24
December 30, 1994	Sun Bowl	Texas	L 30–35
December 30, 1995	CarQuest Bowl	Arkansas	W 20–10
January 1, 1997	Gator Bowl	West Virginia	W 20–13
January 1, 1998	Gator Bowl	Virginia Tech	W 42–3
December 19, 1998	Las Vegas Bowl	San Diego State	W 20–13
December 31, 2001	Peach Bowl	Auburn	W 16–10
December 30, 2004	Continental Tire Bowl	Boston College	L 24–37
December 27, 2008	Meineke Car Care Bowl	West Virginia	L 30–31
December 26, 2009	Meineke Car Care Bowl	Pittsburgh	L 17–19
December 30, 2010	Music City Bowl	Tennessee	W 30–27^{2OT}
December 26, 2011	Independence Bowl	Missouri	L 24–41
December 28, 2013	Belk Bowl	Cincinnati	W 39–17
December 26, 2014	Quick Lane Bowl	Rutgers	L 21–40
December 29, 2015	Russell Athletic Bowl	Baylor	L 38–49
December 30, 2016	Sun Bowl	Stanford	L 23–25
December 27, 2019	Military Bowl	Temple	W 55–13
January 2, 2021	Orange Bowl	Texas A&M	L 27–41
December 30, 2021	Duke's Mayo Bowl	South Carolina	L 21–38
December 28, 2022	Holiday Bowl	Oregon	L 27–28
December 27, 2023	Duke's Mayo Bowl	West Virginia	L 10–30
December 28, 2024	Fenway Bowl	Connecticut	L 14–27

== Rivalries ==
=== Duke ===
The football rivalry between Duke and North Carolina began in 1888, when Duke University was called Trinity College. Trinity won the first game in the longstanding rivalry series. While the basketball rivalry between the two teams overshadows the importance of the yearly matchup on the gridiron, the football iteration has presented its fair share of classic games. The Victory Bell was introduced for the 1948 match-up, which North Carolina won 20–0. It became tradition for the school that has possession of the bell to paint it in the shade of blue of their school. The longest consecutive win streak in the series is a 13-game streak by the Tar Heels from 1990 to 2002. Carolina officially leads the all-time series 64–41–4.

=== North Carolina State ===
The first football game between the NC State Wolfpack and the Tar Heels occurred in 1894, and the Tar Heels won 44–0. The two schools played a total of 42 games (31-5-6 in favor of the Tar Heels) until the formation of the ACC. Since the formation of the ACC in 1953, North Carolina and NC State have played every year and the annual contest has evolved into the biggest rivalry game in football for both schools. The 1998 and 1999 games were held at Bank of America Stadium, the Tar Heels won both games. The longest consecutive win streak in the series is 9 games, from 1943 to 1955 by the Tar Heels.

In the 115 meetings between NC State and the Tar Heels, the all-time series is 68–41–6 in favor of the Tar Heels. Since the creation of the ACC, the Tar Heels hold the edge over the Wolfpack, 37–36, signifying the competitive nature of the rivalry. UNC has lost the last five meetings to the Wolfpack.

=== Virginia ===
The Tar Heels' rivalry with the Virginia Cavaliers began in 1892, and is known as the "South's Oldest Rivalry." The teams played twice in the 1892 season, with the Cavaliers winning the first game and the Tar Heels winning the second. The two teams have played a total of 128 times, making the yearly matchup the fourth most played rivalry game among college football's major conferences. The all-time series record is 67–58–4, in favor of the Tar Heels.

=== Wake Forest ===
Wake Forest and North Carolina have met 113 times, with North Carolina holding a 74–37–2 series lead. The first game between the two teams, in 1888, was the first college football game played in the state of North Carolina. The two teams met annually from 1919 to 2004 until the ACC created the divisional format in 2005.

=== South Carolina ===
The Battle of the Carolinas is a rivalry that began in 1903. North Carolina holds a 36–20–4 overall and leads the series, but South Carolina leads in more recent decades being 13–7 since 1967. While no longer a conference rivalry, since South Carolina left the ACC in 1971, the teams still meet occasionally. While South Carolina was an independent (1971–1991), the teams met ten times with each team winning five. Following South Carolina's membership in the SEC the two teams didn't meet for 16 seasons until finally meeting again in 2007 in Chapel Hill. Since that time the two teams have played five times with South Carolina winning three. The first postseason meeting between the two programs was in the Duke's Mayo Bowl on December 30, 2021, with South Carolina winning 38–21. The most recent meeting between the two teams was in the Duke's Mayo Classic on September 2, 2023, with North Carolina winning 31–17.

== 1,000-yard rushers ==
Throughout the course of the Tar Heels' football history, a player has rushed for over 1,000 yards in a season 32 times. The first player to rush for over a 1,000 yards was Don McCauley, who ran for 1,092 yards in the 1969 season. The most recent Tar Heel to eclipse the 1,000 yard mark in a season was Omarion Hampton, who ran for 1,504 yards in the 2023 season, and 1,660 in 2024.

Year	Player	Yards
1969	Don McCauley	1,092
1970	Don McCauley	1,720
1973	Sammy Johnson	1,006
1974	Jim Betterson	1,082
1974	Mike Voight	1,033
1975	Mike Voight	1,250
1976	Mike Voight	1,407
1977	Amos Lawrence	1,211
1978	Amos Lawrence	1,043
1979	Amos Lawrence	1,019
1980	Amos Lawrence	1,118
1980	Kelvin Bryant	1,039
1981	Kelvin Bryant	1,015
1982	Kelvin Bryant	1,064
1983	Ethan Horton	1,107
1983	Tyrone Anthony	1,063
1984	Ethan Horton	1,247
1986	Derrick Fenner	1,250
1988	Kennard Martin	1,146
1991	Natrone Means	1,030
1992	Natrone Means	1,195
1993	Curtis Johnson	1,034
1993	Leon Johnson	1,012
1997	Jonathan Linton	1,004
2011	Giovani Bernard	1,253
2012	Giovani Bernard	1,228
2015	Elijah Hood	1,463
2019	Michael Carter	1,003
2020	Michael Carter	1,245
2020	Javonte Williams	1,140
2021	Ty Chandler	1,092
2023	Omarion Hampton	1,504
2024	Omarion Hampton	1,660

== Notable players ==
=== Retired numbers ===
Five numbers have been retired by the university.

North Carolina Tar Heels retired numbers
No.	Player	Pos.	Tenure
22	Charlie Justice	HB	1946–1949
46	Bill Sutherland (Note: Posthumous honor after he died in a car accident.)	QB	1946
50	Art Weiner	E	1946–1949
59	Andy Bershak	TE	1935–1937
99	George Barclay (Note: He also served as a coach from 1953 to 1955.)	LB	1932–1934

=== Honored jerseys ===
Beneath the video board in the east end zone of Kenan Stadium, several Tar Heel greats have their jersey numbers honored.

North Carolina Tar Heels honored jerseys
No.	Player	Pos.	Tenure
10	Danny Talbott	QB	1965–1967
12	Ethan Horton	RB	1981–1984
20	Amos Lawrence	RB	1977–1980
23	Don McCauley	RB	1968–1970
25	Irv Holdash	C/LB	1948–1950
31	Dré Bly	CB	1996–1998
41	Brian Simmons	LB	1994–1997
44	Kelvin Bryant	RB	1979–1982
44	Mike Voight	RB	1973–1976
49	Julius Peppers	DE	1999–2001
60	Brian Blados	OT	1980–1983
62	Ron Rusnak	G	1971–1972
64	Jonathan Cooper	G	2008–2012
67	Harris Barton	OT	1983–1986
68	Ken Huff	G	1971–1974
71	Dee Hardison	DT	1974–1977
71	Marcus Jones	DT	1992–1995
85	Bob Lacey	WR	1960–1963
87	Greg Ellis	DE	1994–1997
87	Paul Severin	E	1939–1940
95	William Fuller	DT	1981–1983
98	Lawrence Taylor	LB	1977–1980

=== National award winners ===
- Chuck Bednarik Award: Julius Peppers (2001)
- Lombardi Award: Julius Peppers (2001)
- Jim Parker Award: Landon Turner (2015)

=== College Football Hall of Famers ===
Player	Position	Career
Charlie Justice	HB	1946–49
Don McCauley	RB	1968–70
Art Weiner	TE	1946–49
Dre Bly	CB	1996–98
Harris Barton	OT	1983–86
William Fuller	DE	1981–84
Julius Peppers	DE	1998–01
Jim Tatum	Coach	1942, 1956–58
Carl Snavely	Coach	1934–35, 1945–52
Mack Brown	Coach	1988–97, 2019–24

Brown was inducted as a Texas Longhorn

=== Pro Football Hall of Fame ===
Player	Position	NFL career	Inducted
Lawrence Taylor	OLB	1981-1993	1999
Chris Hanburger	OLB	1965-1978	2011
Julius Peppers	DE	2002-2018	2024

== Future conference opponents ==
Schedule announced September 16, 2026.

2026	2027	2028	2029	2030
Louisville	Duke	Boston College	California	Miami
Miami	Florida State	NC State	Clemson	NC State
NC State	Virginia	Stanford	Duke	SMU
Syracuse	Virginia Tech	Wake Forest	Virginia	Virginia Tech
at Clemson	at Louisville	at Duke	at Louisville	at California
at Duke	at NC State	at Florida State	at Miami	at Clemson
at Pittsburgh	at Stanford	at SMU	at NC State	at Duke
at Virginia	at Syracuse	at Virginia	at Virginia Tech	at Virginia
	at Wake Forest			

== Future non-conference opponents ==
Announced schedules as of October 14, 2026.

NOTE: One non-conference game in 2027, at Purdue, was cancelled to accommodate a ninth conference game.

2026	2027	2028	2029	2030	2031	2032	2036
vs TCU^{1}	North Alabama	North Carolina A&T		Kennesaw State	James Madison	at Purdue	at Notre Dame
ETSU	UCF	Kennesaw State		at Notre Dame	Purdue		
Notre Dame	UConn				Notre Dame		
at UConn							

1. At Dublin, Ireland; Aer Lingus College Football Classic
