= 1927 College Basketball All-Southern Team =

The 1927 College Basketball All-Southern Team consisted of basketball players from the South chosen at their respective positions.

== All-Southerns ==
=== Guards ===
- Walter Forbes, Georgia (AJ-1)
- John McCall, Vanderbilt (AJ-1)
- Bunn Hackney, North Carolina (AJ-2)
- Cecil Jamison, Georgia Tech (AJ-2)

=== Forwards ===
- George Keen, Georgia (AJ-1)
- Paul Dear, VPI (AJ-1)
- Heinie Fair, South Carolina (AJ-2)
- George Florence, Georgia (AJ-2)

=== Center ===
- James Stuart, Vanderbilt (AJ-1)
- John Purser, North Carolina (AJ-2)

== Key ==
- AJ = selected by sportswriters in the Atlanta Journal.
