= 1963 Maryland Terrapins football team =

American college football season

1963 Maryland Terrapins football
- Conference: Atlantic Coast Conference
- Record: 3–7 (2–5 ACC)
- Head coach: Tom Nugent (5th season)
- Home stadium: Byrd Stadium

1963 Atlantic Coast Conference football standings
	Conf.					Overall
Team	W		L		T	W		L		T
North Carolina +	6	–	1	–	0	9	–	2	–	0
NC State +	6	–	1	–	0	8	–	3	–	0
Clemson	5	–	2	–	0	5	–	4	–	1
Duke	5	–	2	–	0	5	–	4	–	1
Maryland	2	–	5	–	0	3	–	7	–	0
South Carolina	1	–	5	–	1	1	–	8	–	1
Wake Forest	1	–	5	–	0	1	–	9	–	0
Virginia	0	–	5	–	1	2	–	7	–	1
+ – Conference co-champions; Rankings from AP Poll

The 1963 Maryland Terrapins football team represented the University of Maryland in the 1963 NCAA University Division football season. In their fifth season under head coach Tom Nugent, the Terrapins compiled a 3–7 record (2–5 in conference), finished in fifth place in the Atlantic Coast Conference, and were outscored by their opponents 201 to 148.

On September 21, Maryland receiver Darryl Hill became the first African-American player to compete in the ACC in the Terps' home game against North Carolina State. Hill was the team's leading receiver but Maryland lost 36–14.

The team's statistical leaders included Dick Shiner with 1,165 passing yards, Jerry Fishman with 480 rushing yards, and Darryl Hill with 516 receiving yards.

== Schedule ==
Date	Opponent	Site	Result	Attendance	Source
September 21	NC State	Byrd Stadium; College Park, MD	L 14–36	28,500	
September 28	at South Carolina	Carolina Stadium; Columbia, SC	L 13–21	13,550	
October 5	vs. Duke	City Stadium; Richmond, VA (Tobacco Bowl)	L 12–30	20,000	
October 12	North Carolina	Byrd Stadium; College Park, MD	L 7–14	21,000	
October 19	Air Force*	Byrd Stadium; College Park, MD	W 21–14	31,000	
October 26	at Wake Forest	Bowman Gray Stadium; Winston-Salem, NC	W 32–0	5,000	
November 2	Penn State*	Byrd Stadium; College Park, MD (rivalry)	L 15–17	35,500	
November 9	at No. 4 Navy*	Navy–Marine Corps Memorial Stadium; Annapolis, MD (rivalry)	L 7–42	30,035	
November 16	at Clemson	Memorial Stadium; Clemson, SC	L 6–21	30,000	
November 28	Virginia	Byrd Stadium; College Park, MD (rivalry)	W 21–6	15,000	
*Non-conference game; Rankings from AP Poll released prior to the game
