= 1963 Duke Blue Devils football team =

American college football season

1963 Duke Blue Devils football
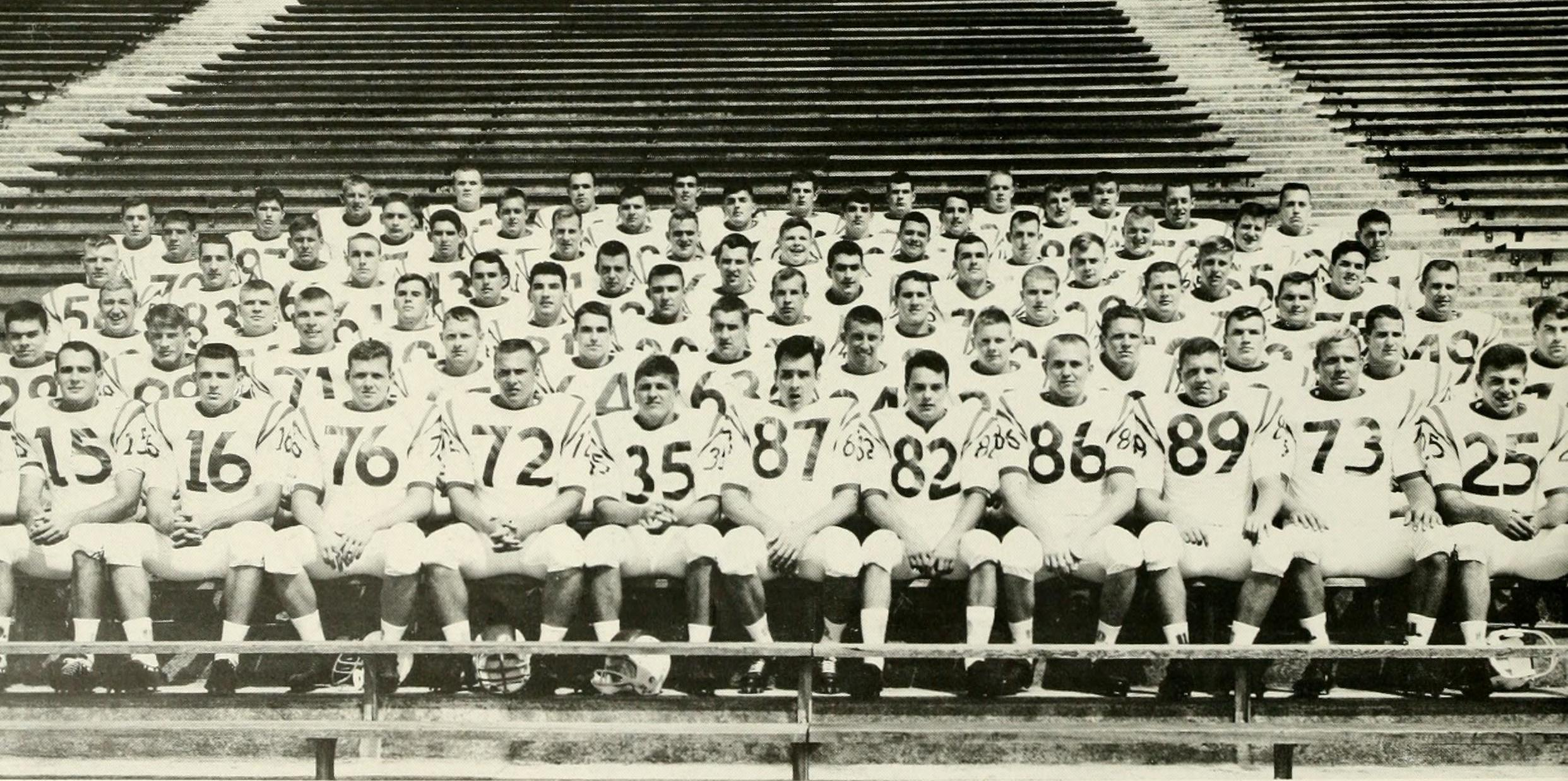
- Conference: Atlantic Coast Conference
- Record: 5–4–1 (5–2 ACC)
- Head coach: William D. Murray (13th season)
- MVP: Jay Wilkinson
- Captain: Chuck Walker
- Home stadium: Duke Stadium

1963 Atlantic Coast Conference football standings
	Conf.					Overall
Team	W		L		T	W		L		T
North Carolina +	6	–	1	–	0	9	–	2	–	0
NC State +	6	–	1	–	0	8	–	3	–	0
Clemson	5	–	2	–	0	5	–	4	–	1
Duke	5	–	2	–	0	5	–	4	–	1
Maryland	2	–	5	–	0	3	–	7	–	0
South Carolina	1	–	5	–	1	1	–	8	–	1
Wake Forest	1	–	5	–	0	1	–	9	–	0
Virginia	0	–	5	–	1	2	–	7	–	1
+ – Conference co-champions; Rankings from AP Poll

The 1963 Duke Blue Devils football team was an American football team that represented Duke University as a member of the Atlantic Coast Conference (ACC) during the 1963 NCAA University Division football season. In their 13th year under head coach William D. Murray, the Blue Devils compiled an overall record of 5–4–1, with a conference record of 5–2, and finished tied for third in the ACC.

== Schedule ==
Date	Opponent	Site	Result	Attendance	Source
September 21	South Carolina	Duke Stadium; Durham, NC	W 22–14	25,000	
September 28	at Virginia	Scott Stadium; Charlottesville, VA	W 30–8	17,000	
October 5	vs. Maryland	City Stadium; Richmond, VA (Tobacco Bowl)	W 30–12	20,000	
October 12	at California*	California Memorial Stadium; Berkeley, CA	T 22–22	36,000	
October 19	Clemson^{†}	Duke Stadium; Durham, NC	W 35–30	28,000	
October 26	at NC State	Riddick Stadium; Raleigh, NC (rivalry)	L 7–21	21,500	
November 2	at Georgia Tech*	Grant Field; Atlanta, GA	L 6–30	52,266	
November 9	Wake Forest	Duke Stadium; Durham, NC (rivalry)	W 39–7	18,000	
November 16	No. 2 Navy*	Duke Stadium; Durham, NC	L 25–38	41,000	
November 28	North Carolina	Duke Stadium; Durham, NC (Victory Bell)	L 14–16	47,500	
*Non-conference game; ^{†}Homecoming; Rankings from AP Poll released prior to the game
