= 1963 Virginia Cavaliers football team =

American college football season

1963 Virginia Cavaliers football
- Conference: Atlantic Coast Conference
- Record: 2–7–1 (0–5–1 ACC)
- Head coach: Bill Elias (3rd season)
- Captain: Turnly Todd
- Home stadium: Scott Stadium

1963 Atlantic Coast Conference football standings
	Conf.					Overall
Team	W		L		T	W		L		T
North Carolina +	6	–	1	–	0	9	–	2	–	0
NC State +	6	–	1	–	0	8	–	3	–	0
Clemson	5	–	2	–	0	5	–	4	–	1
Duke	5	–	2	–	0	5	–	4	–	1
Maryland	2	–	5	–	0	3	–	7	–	0
South Carolina	1	–	5	–	1	1	–	8	–	1
Wake Forest	1	–	5	–	0	1	–	9	–	0
Virginia	0	–	5	–	1	2	–	7	–	1
+ – Conference co-champions; Rankings from AP Poll

The 1963 Virginia Cavaliers football team represented the University of Virginia during the 1963 NCAA University Division football season. The Cavaliers were led by third-year head coach Bill Elias and played their home games at Scott Stadium in Charlottesville, Virginia. They competed as members of the Atlantic Coast Conference, finishing in last.

== Schedule ==
Date	Opponent	Site	Result	Attendance	Source
September 21	at North Carolina	Kenan Memorial Stadium; Chapel Hill, NC (South's Oldest Rivalry)	L 7–11	30,000	
September 28	Duke	Scott Stadium; Charlottesville, VA	L 8–30	17,000	
October 5	vs. Virginia Tech*	Victory Stadium; Roanoke, VA (Harvest Bowl, rivalry)	L 0–10	20,000	
October 12	vs. VMI*	City Stadium; Richmond, VA	W 6–0	10,000	
October 19	South Carolina^{†}	Scott Stadium; Charlottesville, VA	T 10–10	16,000	
October 26	Clemson	Scott Stadium; Charlottesville, VA	L 0–35	18,000	
November 2	vs. NC State	Foreman Field; Norfolk, VA	L 9–15	7,500	
November 9	William & Mary*	Scott Stadium; Charlottesville, VA	W 9–7	16,000	
November 16	at Boston College*	Alumni Stadium; Chestnut Hill, MA	L 21–30	22,200	
November 28	at Maryland	Byrd Stadium; College Park, MD (rivalry)	L 6–21	15,000	
*Non-conference game; ^{†}Homecoming
