= 1963 Clemson Tigers football team =

American college football season

1963 Clemson Tigers football
- Conference: Atlantic Coast Conference
- Record: 6–4 (5–2 ACC)
- Head coach: Frank Howard (24th season)
- Captain: Tracy Childers
- Home stadium: Memorial Stadium

1963 Atlantic Coast Conference football standings
	Conf.					Overall
Team	W		L		T	W		L		T
North Carolina +	6	–	1	–	0	9	–	2	–	0
NC State +	6	–	1	–	0	8	–	3	–	0
Clemson	5	–	2	–	0	5	–	4	–	1
Duke	5	–	2	–	0	5	–	4	–	1
Maryland	2	–	5	–	0	3	–	7	–	0
South Carolina	1	–	5	–	1	1	–	8	–	1
Wake Forest	1	–	5	–	0	1	–	9	–	0
Virginia	0	–	5	–	1	2	–	7	–	1
+ – Conference co-champions; Rankings from AP Poll

The 1963 Clemson Tigers football team was an American football team that represented Clemson University in the Atlantic Coast Conference (ACC) during the 1963 NCAA University Division football season. In its 24th season under head coach Frank Howard, the team compiled a 5–4–1 record (5–2 against conference opponents), tied for third place in the ACC, and outscored opponents by a total of 181 to 140. The team played its home games at Memorial Stadium in Clemson, South Carolina.

The South Carolina game moved from November 23 to November 28 (Thanksgiving) due to the Assassination of John F. Kennedy.

Tracy Childers was the team captain. The team's statistical leaders included Jim Parker with 728 passing yards, Pat Crain with 513 rushing yards and 24 points scored (4 touchdowns), and Johnny Case with 232 receiving yards.

== Schedule ==
Date	Time	Opponent	Site	Result	Attendance	Source
September 21	2:30 p.m.	at No. 4 Oklahoma*	Oklahoma Memorial Stadium; Norman, OK	L 14–31	62,034	
September 28	2:00 p.m.	at No. 9 Georgia Tech*	Grant Field; Atlanta, GA (rivalry)	L 0–27	33,916	
October 5	2:00 p.m.	NC State	Memorial Stadium; Clemson, SC (rivalry)	L 3–7	28,000	
October 12	2:00 p.m.	Georgia*	Memorial Stadium; Clemson, SC (rivalry)	W 7–6	24,000	
October 19	2:00 p.m.	at Duke	Duke Stadium; Durham, NC	L 30–35	28,000	
October 26	1:30 p.m.	at Virginia	Scott Stadium; Charlottesville, VA	W 35–0	18,000	
November 2	2:00 p.m.	Wake Forest	Memorial Stadium; Clemson, SC	W 36–0	21,000	
November 9	1:30 p.m.	at North Carolina	Kenan Memorial Stadium; Chapel Hill, NC	W 11–7	36,600	
November 16	2:00 p.m.	Maryland^{†}	Memorial Stadium; Clemson, SC	W 21–6	30,000	
November 28	2:00 p.m.	at South Carolina	Carolina Stadium; Columbia, SC (rivalry)	W 24–20	37,414	
*Non-conference game; ^{†}Homecoming; Rankings from AP Poll released prior to the game
