= 1963 South Carolina Gamecocks football team =

American college football season

1963 South Carolina Gamecocks football
- Conference: Atlantic Coast Conference
- Record: 1–8–1 (1–5–1 ACC)
- Head coach: Marvin Bass (3rd season)
- Captains: Tim Gibson; Sammy Anderson
- Home stadium: Carolina Stadium

1963 Atlantic Coast Conference football standings
	Conf.					Overall
Team	W		L		T	W		L		T
North Carolina +	6	–	1	–	0	9	–	2	–	0
NC State +	6	–	1	–	0	8	–	3	–	0
Clemson	5	–	2	–	0	5	–	4	–	1
Duke	5	–	2	–	0	5	–	4	–	1
Maryland	2	–	5	–	0	3	–	7	–	0
South Carolina	1	–	5	–	1	1	–	8	–	1
Wake Forest	1	–	5	–	0	1	–	9	–	0
Virginia	0	–	5	–	1	2	–	7	–	1
+ – Conference co-champions; Rankings from AP Poll

The 1963 South Carolina Gamecocks football team represented the University of South Carolina as a member of the Atlantic Coast Conference (ACC) during the 1963 NCAA University Division football season. Led by third-year head coach Marvin Bass, the Gamecocks compiled an overall record of 1–8–1 with a mark of 1–5–1 in conference play, placing sixth in the ACC. The team played home games at Carolina Stadium in Columbia, South Carolina.

== Schedule ==
Date	Opponent	Site	Result	Attendance	Source
September 21	at Duke	Duke Stadium; Durham, NC	L 14–22	25,000	
September 28	Maryland	Carolina Stadium; Columbia, SC	W 21–13	13,550	
October 5	at Georgia*	Sanford Stadium; Athens, GA (rivalry)	L 7–27	33,500	
October 12	NC State	Carolina Stadium; Columbia, SC	L 6–18	16,672	
October 19	at Virginia	Scott Stadium; Charlottesville, VA	T 10–10	16,000	
October 26	North Carolina	Carolina Stadium; Columbia, SC (rivalry)	L 0–7	23,000	
November 2	Tulane*	Carolina Stadium; Columbia, SC	L 7–20	18,372	
November 9	at Memphis State*	Crump Stadium; Memphis, TN	L 0–9	17,006	
November 16	at Wake Forest	Bowman Gray Stadium; Winston-Salem, NC	L 19–20	7,000	
November 28	Clemson	Carolina Stadium; Columbia, SC (rivalry)	L 20–24	37,414	
*Non-conference game
