= 1963 Wake Forest Demon Deacons football team =

American college football season

1963 Wake Forest Demon Deacons football
- Conference: Atlantic Coast Conference
- Record: 1–9 (1–5 ACC)
- Head coach: Bill Hildebrand (4th season)
- Captain: Bill Faircloth
- Home stadium: Bowman Gray Stadium

1963 Atlantic Coast Conference football standings
	Conf.					Overall
Team	W		L		T	W		L		T
North Carolina +	6	–	1	–	0	9	–	2	–	0
NC State +	6	–	1	–	0	8	–	3	–	0
Clemson	5	–	2	–	0	5	–	4	–	1
Duke	5	–	2	–	0	5	–	4	–	1
Maryland	2	–	5	–	0	3	–	7	–	0
South Carolina	1	–	5	–	1	1	–	8	–	1
Wake Forest	1	–	5	–	0	1	–	9	–	0
Virginia	0	–	5	–	1	2	–	7	–	1
+ – Conference co-champions; Rankings from AP Poll

The 1963 Wake Forest Demon Deacons football team was an American football team that represented Wake Forest University during the 1963 NCAA University Division football season. In its fourth season under head coach Bill Hildebrand, the team compiled a 1–9 record and finished in seventh place in the Atlantic Coast Conference (ACC).

== Schedule ==
Date	Opponent	Site	Result	Attendance	Source
September 21	at East Carolina*	Ficklen Memorial Stadium; Greenville, NC	L 10–20	17,000	
September 28	Virginia Tech*	Bowman Gray Stadium; Winston-Salem, NC	L 0–27	7,000	
October 5	North Carolina	Bowman Gray Stadium; Winston-Salem, NC (rivalry)	L 0–21	12,000	
October 12	at Florida State*	Doak Campbell Stadium; Tallahassee, FL	L 0–35	15,000	
October 19	at Army*	Michie Stadium; West Point, NY	L 0–47	30,200	
October 26	Maryland	Bowman Gray Stadium; Winston-Salem, NC	L 0–32	5,000	
November 2	at Clemson	Memorial Stadium; Clemson, SC	L 0–36	21,000	
November 9	at Duke	Duke Stadium; Durham, NC (rivalry)	L 7–39	18,000	
November 16	South Carolina	Bowman Gray Stadium; Winston-Salem, NC	W 20–19	7,000	
November 22	at NC State	Riddick Stadium; Raleigh, NC (rivalry)	L 0–42	15,200	
*Non-conference game

== Team leaders ==
Category	Team Leader	Att/Cth	Yds
Passing	Karl Sweetan	79/218	674
Rushing	Brian Piccolo	84	367
Receiving	Wayne Welborn	17	102
