= 1963 NC State Wolfpack football team =

American college football season

1963 NC State Wolfpack football

ACC co-champion

Liberty Bowl, L 12–16 vs. Mississippi State
- Conference: Atlantic Coast Conference
- Record: 8–3 (6–1 ACC)
- Head coach: Earle Edwards (10th season)
- Home stadium: Riddick Stadium

1963 Atlantic Coast Conference football standings
	Conf.					Overall
Team	W		L		T	W		L		T
North Carolina +	6	–	1	–	0	9	–	2	–	0
NC State +	6	–	1	–	0	8	–	3	–	0
Clemson	5	–	2	–	0	5	–	4	–	1
Duke	5	–	2	–	0	5	–	4	–	1
Maryland	2	–	5	–	0	3	–	7	–	0
South Carolina	1	–	5	–	1	1	–	8	–	1
Wake Forest	1	–	5	–	0	1	–	9	–	0
Virginia	0	–	5	–	1	2	–	7	–	1
+ – Conference co-champions; Rankings from AP Poll

The 1963 NC State Wolfpack football team represented North Carolina State University during the 1963 NCAA University Division football season. The Wolfpack were led by 10th-year head coach Earle Edwards and played their home games at Riddick Stadium in Raleigh, North Carolina. They competed as members of the Atlantic Coast Conference, winning their second ever ACC title with a record of 6–1, a title shared with North Carolina. They were invited to the 1963 Liberty Bowl, the last to be played in Philadelphia before the game moved to Memphis, Tennessee, where they were defeated by Mississippi State.

The game against Wake Forest took place hours after the assassination of President John F. Kennedy. It was only of only 7 games that went ahead afterwards while all others were canceled or postponed.

== Schedule ==
Date	Opponent	Site	Result	Attendance	Source
September 21	at Maryland	Byrd Stadium; College Park, MD	W 36–14	28,500	
September 28	at Southern Miss*	Faulkner Field; Hattiesburg, MS	W 14–0	11,500	
October 5	at Clemson	Memorial Stadium; Clemson, SC (rivalry)	W 7–3	28,000	
October 12	at South Carolina	Carolina Stadium; Columbia, SC	W 18–6	16,672	
October 19	at North Carolina	Kenan Memorial Stadium; Chapel Hill, NC (rivalry)	L 10–31	45,500	
October 26	Duke	Riddick Stadium; Raleigh, NC (rivalry)	W 21–7	21,500	
November 2	vs. Virginia	Foreman Field; Norfolk, VA	W 15–9	7,500	
November 9	Virginia Tech*	Riddick Stadium; Raleigh, NC	W 13–7	20,500	
November 16	at Florida State*	Doak Campbell Stadium; Tallahassee, FL	L 0–14	23,851	
November 22	Wake Forest	Riddick Stadium; Raleigh, NC (rivalry)	W 42–0	15,200	
December 21	vs. Mississippi State*	Philadelphia Municipal Stadium; Philadelphia, PA (Liberty Bowl)	L 12–16	8,309	
*Non-conference game
