= 1963 Gator Bowl =

American college football game

Air Force Falcons	North Carolina Tar Heels
(7–3)	(8–2)
Independent	ACC
0	35
Head coach: Ben Martin	Head coach: Jim Hickey
	AP / Coaches; NR / 19
	1	2	3	4	Total
Air Force	0	0	0	0	0
North Carolina	6	14	8	7	35
- Date: December 28, 1963
- Season: 1963
- Stadium: Gator Bowl Stadium
- Location: Jacksonville, Florida
- MVP: Ken Willard (RB, North Carolina) & Dave Sicks (FB, Air Force)
- Referee: Jack Vest
- Attendance: 50,018

United States TV coverage
- Network: CBS
- Announcers: Lindsey Nelson; Terry Brennan; Jim Simpson

The 1963 Gator Bowl was a college football postseason bowl game that featured the Air Force Falcons and the North Carolina Tar Heels.

== Background ==
This was the Falcons' first bowl game since 1959. The Tar Heels were co-champions of the Atlantic Coast Conference, which was their first conference title since the 1949 Southern Conference title. This was their first bowl game in 1950.

== Game summary ==
- UNC – Willard 1-yard run (Kick failed), 2:34 remaining
- UNC – Edge 6-yard run (Pass failed), 9:40 remaining
- UNC – Robinson 5-yard pass from Black (Robinson pass from Black), 4:29 remaining
- UNC – Kesler 1-yard run (Lacey pass from Edge), 4:44 remaining
- UNC – Black 5-yard run (Chapman kick), 13:19 remaining

Willard ran for 94 yards on 18 carries.

== Aftermath ==
Air Force did not return to a bowl game until 1971, nor win one until 1982. North Carolina did not return to a bowl game until 1970.

The morning after the game, there was a fire at the Hotel Roosevelt in downtown Jacksonville, with 22 dying.

== Statistics ==
Statistics	Air Force	North Carolina
First downs	14	23
Rushing yards	95	251
Passing yards	165	119
Punts–average	4–40.0	6–36.0
Fumbles–lost	3–2	2–0
Penalties–yards	3–42	3–35
