= 1963 North Carolina Tar Heels football team =

American college football season

1963 North Carolina Tar Heels football

ACC co-champion Gator Bowl champion

Gator Bowl, W 35–0 vs. Air Force
- Conference: Atlantic Coast Conference

Ranking
- Coaches: No. 19
- Record: 9–2 (6–1 ACC)
- Head coach: Jim Hickey (5th season)
- Captains: Gene Sigmon; Roger Smith
- Home stadium: Kenan Memorial Stadium

1963 Atlantic Coast Conference football standings
| | Conf. | | | | | Overall |
| Team | W | | L | | T | W | | L | | T |
|---|---|---|---|---|---|---|---|---|---|---|
| North Carolina + | 6 | – | 1 | – | 0 | 9 | – | 2 | – | 0 |
| NC State + | 6 | – | 1 | – | 0 | 8 | – | 3 | – | 0 |
| Clemson | 5 | – | 2 | – | 0 | 5 | – | 4 | – | 1 |
| Duke | 5 | – | 2 | – | 0 | 5 | – | 4 | – | 1 |
| Maryland | 2 | – | 5 | – | 0 | 3 | – | 7 | – | 0 |
| South Carolina | 1 | – | 5 | – | 1 | 1 | – | 8 | – | 1 |
| Wake Forest | 1 | – | 5 | – | 0 | 1 | – | 9 | – | 0 |
| Virginia | 0 | – | 5 | – | 1 | 2 | – | 7 | – | 1 |
+ – Conference co-champions; Rankings from AP Poll

The 1963 North Carolina Tar Heels football team represented the University of North Carolina at Chapel Hill during the 1963 NCAA University Division football season. The Tar Heels were led by fifth-year head coach Jim Hickey and played their home games at Kenan Memorial Stadium. They competed as members of the Atlantic Coast Conference, finishing as co-champions with a league record of 6–1.

Bob Lacey led the ACC in receiving with 48 catches for 533 yards. He was selected as a first-team All-American by the Associated Press, Football Writers Association of America and NEA.

== Schedule ==
| Date | Time | Opponent | Site | TV | Result | Attendance | Source |
|---|---|---|---|---|---|---|---|
| September 21 | 1:30 p.m. | Virginia | Kenan Memorial Stadium; Chapel Hill, NC (South's Oldest Rivalry) | | W 11–7 | 30,000 | |
| September 28 | 1:30 p.m. | at Michigan State* | Spartan Stadium; East Lansing, MI | | L 0–31 | 60,832 | |
| October 5 | 8:00 p.m. | at Wake Forest | Bowman Gray Stadium; Winston-Salem, NC (rivalry) | | W 21–0 | 12,000 | |
| October 12 | 2:00 p.m. | at Maryland | Byrd Stadium; College Park, MD | | W 14–7 | 21,000 | |
| October 19 | 1:30 p.m. | NC State | Kenan Memorial Stadium; Chapel Hill, NC (rivalry) | | W 31–10 | 45,500 | |
| October 26 | 2:00 p.m. | at South Carolina | Carolina Stadium; Columbia, SC (rivalry) | | W 7–0 | 23,000 | |
| November 2 | 1:30 p.m. | Georgia* | Kenan Memorial Stadium; Chapel Hill, NC | | W 28–7 | 34,000 | |
| November 9 | 1:30 p.m. | Clemson | Kenan Memorial Stadium; Chapel Hill, NC | | L 7–11 | 36,600 | |
| November 16 | 1:30 p.m. | Miami (FL)* | Kenan Memorial Stadium; Chapel Hill, NC | | W 27–16 | 28,000 | |
| November 28 | 2:00 p.m. | at Duke | Duke Stadium; Durham, NC (Victory Bell) | | W 16–14 | 47,500 | |
| December 28 | 1:30 p.m. | vs. Air Force* | Gator Bowl Stadium; Jacksonville, FL (Gator Bowl) | CBS | W 35–0 | 50,018 | |
*Non-conference game; All times are in Eastern time
