= Jim Hickey (American football) =

American sports player and coach (1920–1997)

- Hickey pictured in Yackety Yack 1967, North Carolina yearbook

Biographical details
- Born: January 22, 1920; Pennsylvania, U.S.
- Died: December 27, 1997 (aged 77); Southern Pines, North Carolina, U.S.

Playing career

Football
- 1938–1941: William & Mary

Basketball
- 1940, 1942: William & Mary
- Positions: Wingback, tailback (football); Guard (basketball)

Coaching career (HC unless noted)
- 1951–1955: Hampden–Sydney
- 1956–1958: North Carolina (assistant)
- 1959–1966: North Carolina

Administrative career (AD unless noted)
- 1951–1955: Hampden–Sydney
- 1966–1969: Connecticut

Head coaching record
- Overall: 63–56–4
- Bowls: 1–0

Accomplishments and honors

Championships
- 3 Virginia Little Six/Seven (1952–1953, 1955); 2 Mason-Dixon (1953–1954); 1 ACC (1963)

Awards
- ACC Coach of the Year (1963)

James Benton Hickey (January 22, 1920 – December 27, 1997) was an American football and basketball player, coach of football, and college athletics administrator. He served as the head football coach at Hampden–Sydney College from 1951 to 1955 and at the University of North Carolina at Chapel Hill from 1959 to 1966, compiling a career college football record of 63–56–4. Hickey was the athletic director at the University of Connecticut from 1966 to 1969.

== Education and career ==
Hickey graduated from The College of William & Mary in 1942 and played wingback and tailback on the football team and guard on the basketball team. He was inducted into the William & Mary Athletics Hall of Fame in 1971. He served as a Lieutenant (junior grade) in the United States Navy during World War II. He coached football at Hampden–Sydney College for five years before joining the staff of Jim Tatum at the University of North Carolina in 1956 as an assistant. After Tatum's death in the summer of 1959, he accepted the position of head coach. Hickey was dismissed after the 1966 season and Bill Dooley succeeded him as North Carolina's head coach.

== Family ==
Hickey was the son of William and Cora Hickey. He married Agnes Pauline Small Pardue on November 14, 1976, in Sanford, North Carolina. He died at the age of seventy-seven on December 27, 1997 and was buried at the Buffalo Cemetery in Sanford.

== Head coaching record ==
Year	Team	Overall	Conference	Standing	Bowl/playoffs	Coaches^{#}	AP^{°}
Hampden–Sydney Tigers (Mason-Dixon Conference / Virginia Little Six/Seven Conference) (1951–1955)
1951	Hampden–Sydney	4–3–2	1–1–2 / 1–1–1	3rd / T–2nd			
1952	Hampden–Sydney	5–3–1	2–1–1 / 2–0–1	2nd / 1st			
1953	Hampden–Sydney	5–1–1	3–0–1 / 3–0	1st / 1st			
1954	Hampden–Sydney	5–3	3–1 / 2–1	1st / 2nd			
1955	Hampden–Sydney	8–1	3–1 / 2–1	2nd / T–1st			
Hampden–Sydney:		27–11–4	15–6–4				
North Carolina Tar Heels (Atlantic Coast Conference) (1959–1966)
1959	North Carolina	5–5	5–2	2nd			
1960	North Carolina	3–7	2–5	T–6th			
1961	North Carolina	5–5	4–3	2nd			
1962	North Carolina	3–7	3–4	T–4th			
1963	North Carolina	9–2	6–1	T–1st	W Gator	19	
1964	North Carolina	5–5	4–3	T–3rd			
1965	North Carolina	4–6	3–3	T–5th			
1966	North Carolina	2–8	1–4	8th			
North Carolina:		36–45	28–25				
Total:		63–56–4					
National championship Conference title Conference division title or championship game berth
^{#}Rankings from final Coaches Poll.; ^{°}Rankings from final AP Poll.
