= Rameses (mascot) =

Mascot of the North Carolina Tar Heels

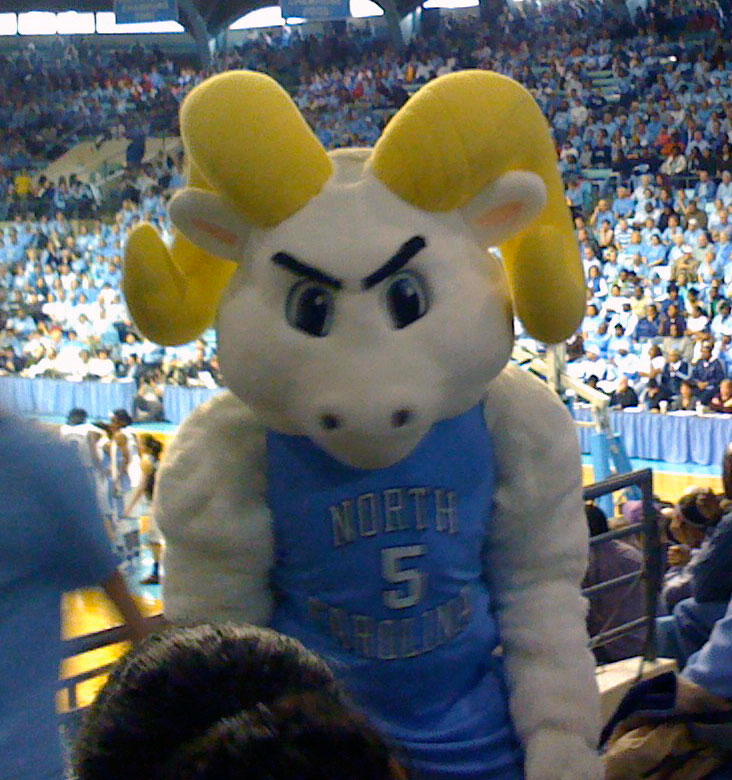
- Costumed Rameses at Carmichael Auditorium, 2008
- University: University of North Carolina at Chapel Hill
- Conference: ACC
- Description: Dorset Horn sheep
- Origin of name: Jack ("The Battering Ram") Merritt
- First seen: 1924
- Related mascot(s): Rameses Jr.

Rameses is the ram mascot of the North Carolina Tar Heels. The anthropomorphic version of him wears a Tar Heels jersey. Two versions of Rameses appear at UNC sporting events. One is a member of the UNC cheerleading team in an anthropomorphic ram costume; the other is a live Dorset Horn sheep named Rameses who attends Carolina football games with his horns painted Carolina blue. There is a third UNC mascot; another anthropomorphic ram, Rameses Jr., or RJ for short.

== Origin ==
The origin of a ram as North Carolina's mascot dates back to 1924. In 1922, the star fullback, Jack Merritt, was given the nickname "the battering ram" for his performance on the field, as well as for an initiation ritual he created for male freshman students. Vic Huggins, North Carolina's head cheerleader at the time, suggested the idea of a ram mascot to the athletic business manager, Charles T. Woollen, and had the idea approved. Woollen gave Huggins $25 to purchase a ram. Rameses the First was shipped from Texas, just in time for the pep rally.

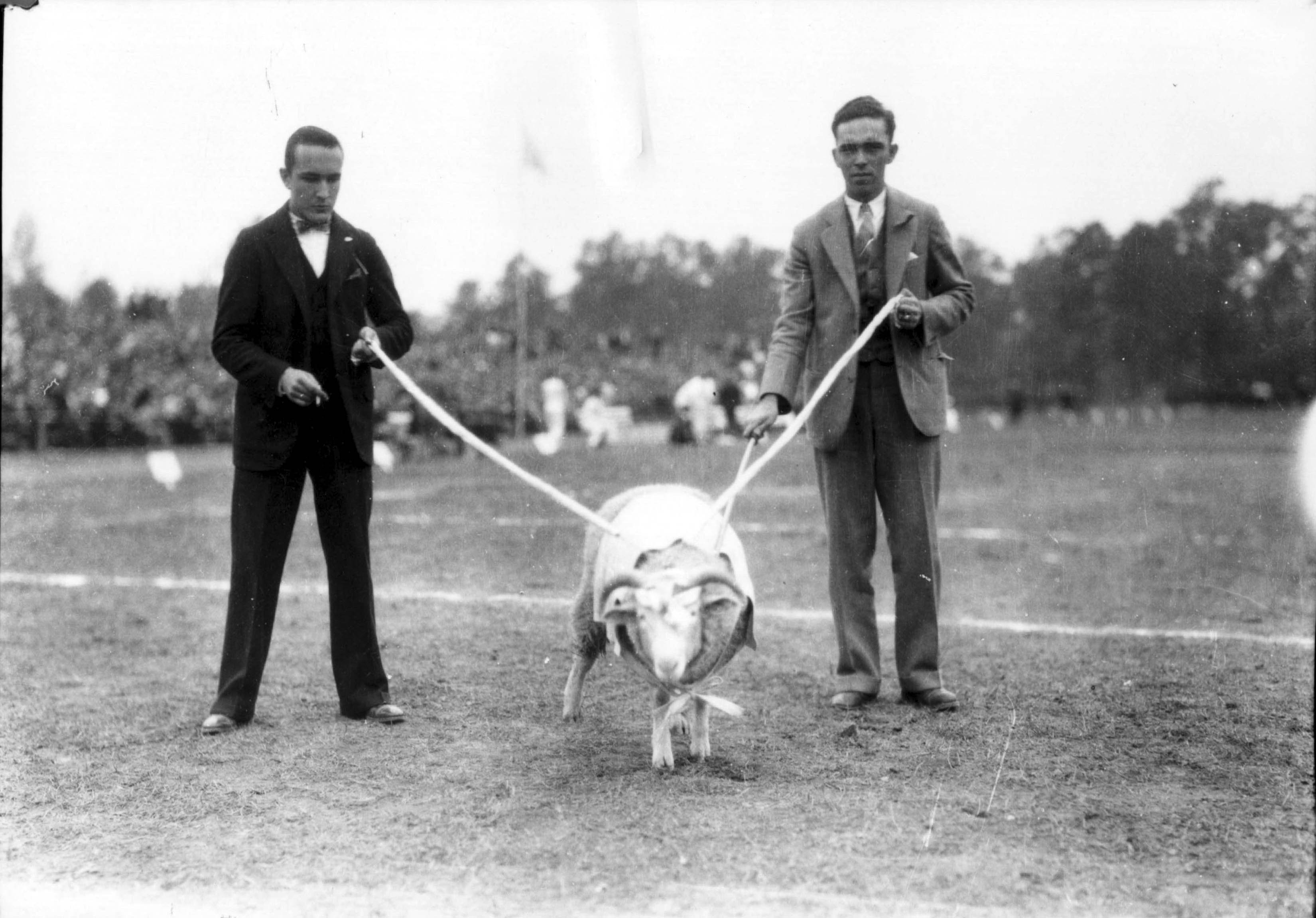
Rameses c. 1925

The first appearance of Rameses was at a pep rally before the football game against Virginia Military Institute on November 8, 1924. After the pep rally the ram was taken to "Emerson Field". Through three quarters the game was scoreless. Late in the fourth quarter Bunn Hackney was called out to attempt a field goal. Before stepping out on the field he rubbed Rameses' head. Just a few seconds later Hackney kicked a 30-yard field goal that eventually won the game for the Tar Heels; the final score was 3-0. Rameses has been a fixture on the sidelines at UNC football games ever since. The current Rameses ram is under the care of the Hogan family of Chapel Hill.

The origin of the costumed version of Rameses dates back to the 1987-88 season. Auditions were held and a senior, Eric Chilton from Mount Airy, North Carolina, was given the honor to be the first mascot. Since auditions were held in the middle of the school year he only served for half a year and only showed up in a few basketball games in early 1988. The costume was made locally and looked different from the one used today.

As of Spring 2022, former In-Suit Performer Daniel Wood was hired as the permanent UNC Mascot Coordinator and Coach.

== Rameses Jr. ==
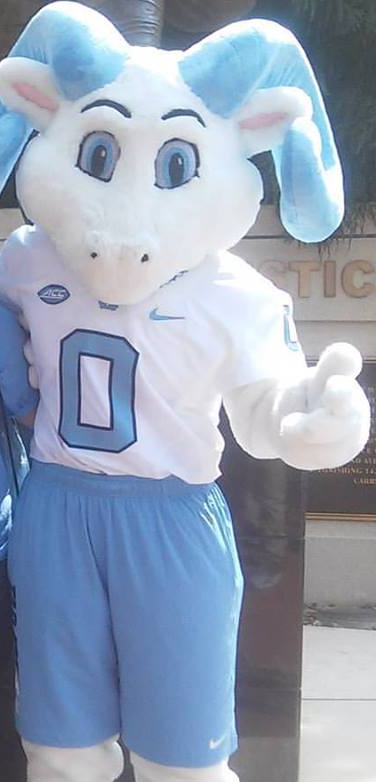
Rameses Jr. at a football game in 2016

On the evening of October 26, 2015, Rameses Jr., or RJ for short, made his debut during Late Night with Roy, North Carolina Tar Heels men's basketball's annual Midnight Madness event. He is an anthropomorphic lamb who wears the number #0. Brown Walters, the director of spirit programs at UNC Chapel Hill, told The Daily Tar Heel it took a year to come up with the concept of RJ. RJ was conceived in part to expand the reach of UNC Chapel Hill's spirit program. RJ was designed to feature a less muscular body, Carolina blue horns, blue eyes and Jordan-brand apparel, was also developed to appeal to children. Walters said small children were frightened by the current version of the Rameses costume.

== Killing of Rameses XXIII ==
In February 1996, Rameses XXIII was killed in his pasture at the Hogan farm. An attacker slashed the ram's throat and cut off its left front leg, stabbing it as many as 10 times along its chest and neck. State veterinarians stated that the slash to its throat was most likely the fatal wound. Police later charged 26-year-old Scott Wade. Wade stumbled onto the Hogan farm drunk at the time of the slaying. Investigators believed Wade killed the ram because he was hungry. Wade was later charged with misdemeanor animal cruelty.

== Jason Ray ==
On March 23, 2007, Jason Ray, a member of the UNC Chapel Hill cheerleading squad, was struck by a vehicle near a Hilton Hotel on Route 4 in Fort Lee, New Jersey. The Tar Heel men's basketball team had advanced to the 2007 East Regional semifinals, and the Fort Lee Hilton was the Tar Heel team hotel. Ray was walking to a convenience store to buy a burrito and a soda before he was due to portray Rameses in the game against the USC Trojans. Ray died on March 26, 2007, at the Hackensack University Medical Center as a result of the injuries sustained in the accident.

Ray was an honors student and was due to graduate that May with a degree in business administration and a minor in religious studies. He was an Eagle Scout with Troop 38 in Concord, NC, had gone on three missionary trips (Haiti, Honduras, and Puerto Rico) to work with children, had visited the Sistine Chapel, ran with the bulls in Spain, and spent a summer studying in Copenhagen, Denmark. Ray was also an active member of InterVarsity Christian Fellowship, his church choir, and was the lead singer in the band Nine PM Traffic.

Four people received organ transplants because of Ray's decision to become an organ donor.

On April 16, 2016, UNC Hospitals dedicated its transplant clinic to Ray. An endowment fund, also dedicated to Ray, was started to raise funds for patients unable to pay for their transplants. The Ray family pledged to raise one million dollars for this endowment fund.

On September 21, 2017, it was announced Rameses and RJ would wear patches commemorating honoring Ray's memory for all sporting events held during the 2017-18 season, starting with the 2017 North Carolina Tar Heels football team's game against Duke.

== In-suit mascot performers ==
Known Ram Fam Members
Year	Name	Character
1987-1988	Eric Chilton	Rameses
1990-1993	Brad Peeler	Rameses
-'92	Vince Lai	Rameses
'92-'93	John Lilley	Rameses
'93-'95	Michael Glazer	Rameses
-'96	Neil Waters	Rameses
-'98	Mike Williams	Rameses
-'99	Todd May	Rameses
1996-1999	Hassan Elfsayal	Rameses
	Roger Smith	Rameses
1999-2002	Paul Holshouser	Rameses
2002-2003	James Collins	Rameses
	Andrew Head	Rameses
-2007	Jason Ray	Rameses
2006-2009	Tyler Treadaway	Rameses
	Kyle Smith	Rameses
	Seth Goddard	Rameses
2011-2015	Evan Sherwood	Rameses
2012-2014	Mason Braswell	Rameses
2012-2016	Logan Hiers*	Rameses
2013-2015	Jarrett Whitworth	Rameses
2014-2017	Alex Floch	Rameses
2015-2018	Anne Prendergast	RJ
2015-2017	Katherine Brinkley	RJ
	Ryan Nunn	Rameses
2015-2018	Trey Hiers*	Rameses
2015-2019	Elizabeth Pollard	RJ
2016-2020	Austin Taylor	Rameses
2017-2020	Matt Babb*	Rameses
2017-2021	Anna Garrett	RJ
2017-2021	Andrea Brain	RJ
2018-2022	Daniel Wood*	Rameses
2019-2022	Kathryn Goodwin	RJ
2019-2022	Amelia Curtis	RJ
2019-2023	Julian Cave	Rameses
2019-2023	Jamal Smith	Rameses
2021-2024	Richard Whitfield	Rameses
2022-2024	Victoria Graham	RJ
2021-2026	Alex Henson	Rameses
2021-2025	Paige Kenerly*	RJ
2021-2025	Gabby Gazaille	RJ
2023-2025	Joseph Bryson	Rameses
2024-2025	Michael Wilkerson	Rameses
2023-2026	Jake Tremain*	Rameses
2024-2026	JT Tygart	Rameses

*Indicates performer served as a mascot team captain. Tracking started in mid-2010s.
