= Bunn Hackney =

American football and basketball player/referee

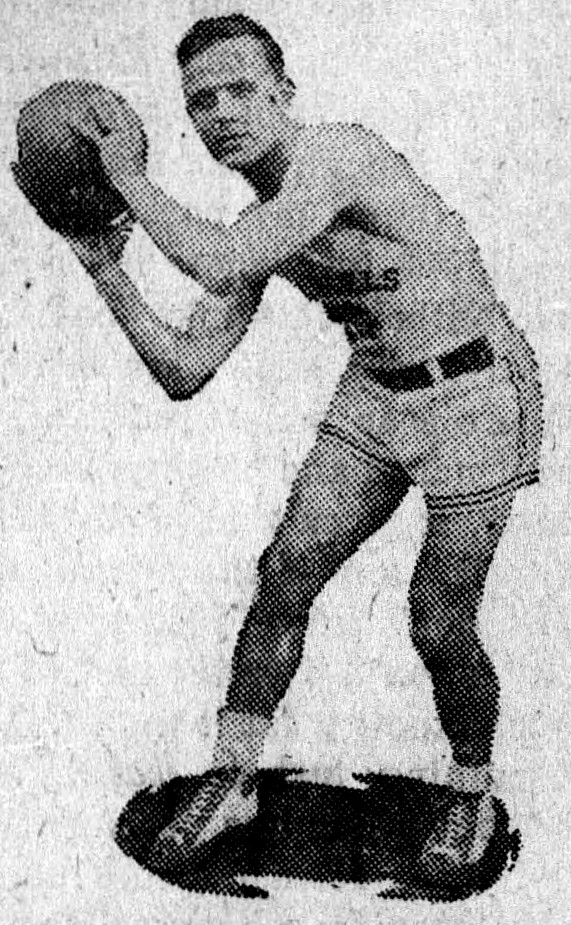
- Hackney, circa 1927

Personal information
- Born: December 1, 1903
- Died: March 17, 1999 (aged 95)

Career information
- College: North Carolina (1924–1927)
- Position: Guard

Career highlights
- All-Southern (1926, 1927); SoCon champion (1925, 1926)

Bunn Hackney (December 1, 1903 – March 17, 1999) was a college basketball and football player for the North Carolina Tar Heels. He was an All-Southern running guard on the basketball team, with Jack Cobb. He had previously played for Merrill Patton "Footsie" Knight at the YMCA in Durham. The origin story for the Rameses mascot is his rubbing a ram's head prior to making a 30-yard drop kick to defeat VMI 3-0 in 1924. He was later a referee in both sports; a head linesman in football.
