= History of Michigan Wolverines football in the Elliott years =

Michigan Wolverines football
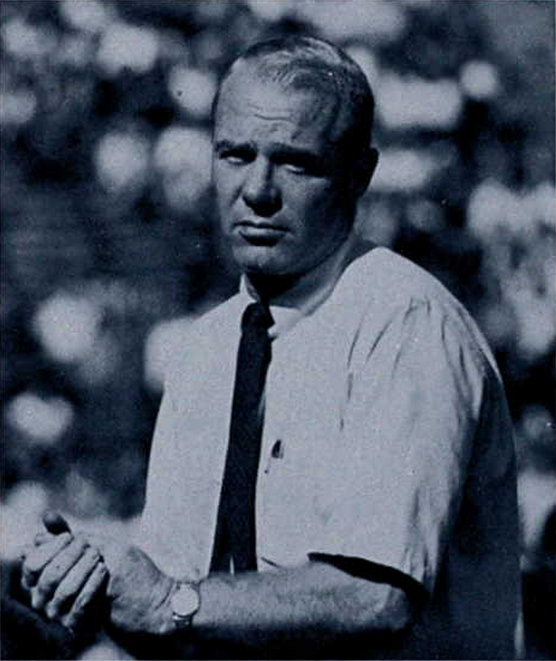
- Athletic director: Fritz Crisler (1942–1968); Don Canham (1968–1988)
- Head coach: Bump Elliott; 10 season, 51–42–2 (.547)
- Location: Ann Arbor, Michigan
- Stadium: Michigan Stadium
- Conference: Big Ten Conference
- Colors: Maize and blue
- Bowl record: 1–0 (1.000)

Conference championships
- 1

The promotion of Bump Elliott to head coach in 1959 defined a historical era of the University of Michigan Wolverines football through 1968 when he resigned after that season. Michigan was a member of the Big Ten Conference and played its home games at Michigan Stadium during the Elliott years. During the 10 years in which Elliott served as head football coach, Michigan compiled a record of 51–42–2 (.547) and claimed one Big Ten championship, one Rose Bowl victory, and two Chicago Tribune Silver Football awards for the most valuable player in the Big Ten. However, the Wolverines finished higher than third place in the Big Ten only twice.

The 1964 team compiled a 9–1 record, won the Big Ten championship, defeated Oregon State in the 1965 Rose Bowl, and finished the season ranked No. 4 in both the AP and UPI polls. Quarterback Bob Timberlake was selected as an All-American and won the 1964 Chicago Tribune Silver Football award. After losing to Michigan by a 34–7 score in the Rose Bowl, Oregon State coach Tommy Prothro opined that the 1964 Wolverines were "the greatest football team he has ever seen."

In Elliott's final year as head coach, the 1968 team compiled an 8–2 record (6–1 Big Ten) and was ranked No. 12 in the final AP Poll. Running back Ron Johnson won the Chicago Tribune Silver Football award and broke Michigan's single-game and single-season rushing records. Johnson's 347-yard rushing performance against Wisconsin still stands as Michigan's single-game record. The 1968 team also included a core of young players who became stars in the early years of the Schembechler era.

Four Michigan football players from the Elliott years have been inducted into the College Football Hall of Fame. They are Tom Curtis (halfback and defensive back, 1967–1969), Dan Dierdorf (offensive tackle, 1968–1970), Ron Johnson (halfback, 1966–1968), and Jim Mandich (tight end, 1967–1969). Dierdorf and a fifth player, Tom Mack (tackle, 1963–1965), have been inducted into the Pro Football Hall of Fame. A sixth, Dave Raimey (halfback, 1960–1962), has been inducted into the Canadian Football Hall of Fame.

== Year-by-year results ==
| Season | Place | Record | PF | PA | Captain | MVP |
| 1959 team | 7th | 4–5 | 122 | 161 | George Genyk | Tony Rio |
| 1960 team | 5th | 5–4 | 133 | 84 | Gerald Smith | Dick Fitzgerald |
| 1961 team | 6th | 6–3 | 212 | 163 | George Mans | John Walker |
| 1962 team | 10th | 2–7 | 70 | 214 | Bob Brown | Dave Raimey |
| 1963 team | 5th (tie) | 3–4–2 | 131 | 127 | Joe O'Donnell | Tom Keating |
| 1964 team | 1st | 9–1 | 235 | 83 | Jim Conley | Bob Timberlake |
| 1965 team | 7th (tie) | 4–6 | 185 | 161 | Tom Cecchini | Bill Yearby |
| 1966 team | 3rd (tie) | 6–4 | 236 | 138 | Jack Clancy | Jack Clancy |
| 1967 team | 5th (tie) | 4–6 | 144 | 179 | Joe Dayton | Ron Johnson |
| 1968 team | 2nd | 8–2 | 277 | 155 | Ron Johnson | Ron Johnson |

== Overview ==
=== Hiring of Elliott ===
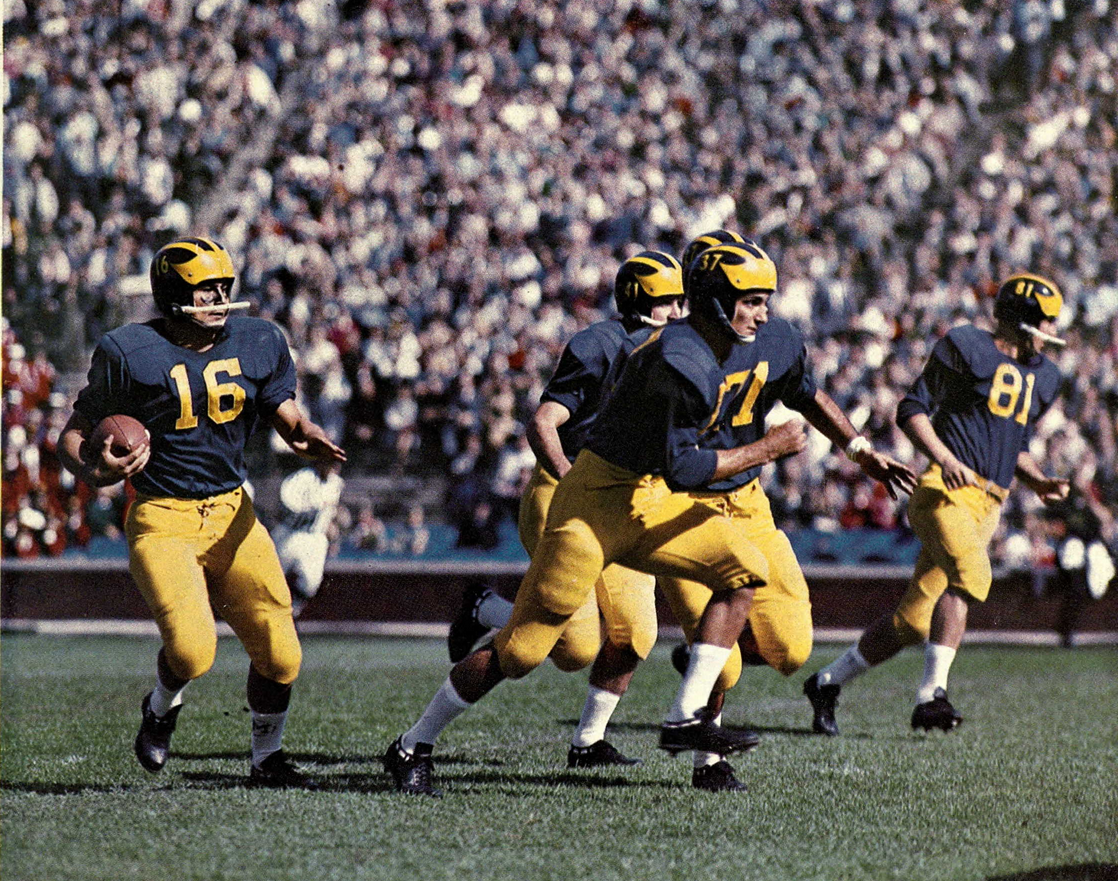
Fred Julian carries the ball for Michigan in 1959.

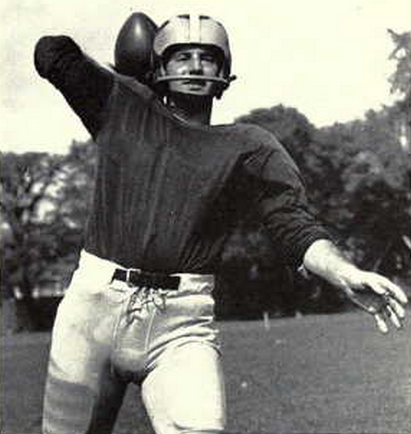
Quarterback Stan Noskin led the offense in 1959.

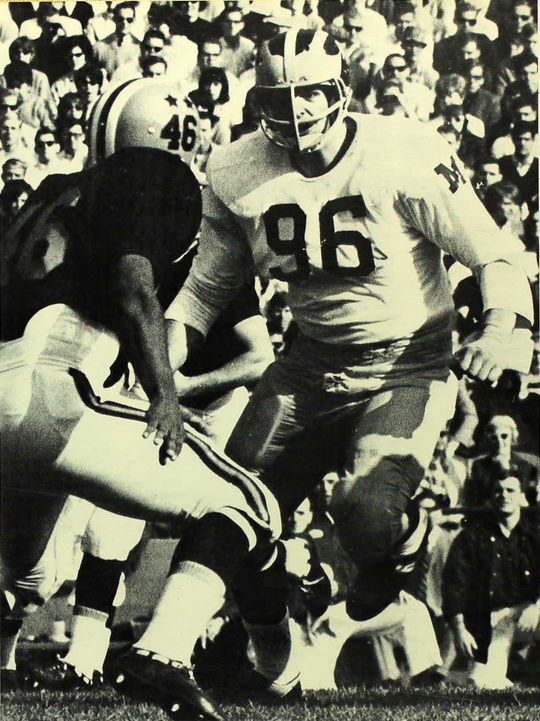
Pro Football Hall of Fame inductee Tom Mack

The 1958 Michigan team compiled a 2–6–1 record under 11th-year head coach Bennie Oosterbaan. On November 14, 1958, before the final two losses of the season had been recorded, Oosterbaan announced that he was resigning effective at the end of the season. University officials announced that Bump Elliott would succeed Oosterbaan as the head football coach in 1959. Elliott had played for Michigan under Fritz Crisler and had won the Chicago Tribune Silver Football award in 1947 as the most valuable player in the Big Ten Conference. Elliott had held several assistant coaching positions since 1948, including a position as the backfield coach at Michigan during the 1957 and 1958 seasons. At age 33, he became the youngest head coach in the conference.

Elliott promptly shook up the coaching staff, retaining only two of Oosterbaan's assistants. He hired three young, new assistant coaches: Jack Fouts from Bowling Green, Jack "Jocko" Nelson from Colorado, and Henry Fonde, Elliott's former teammate who was coaching high school football in Ann Arbor. Predicting that he would require three to five years to rebuild and win a championship, Elliott discarded the single-wing formation that had been the mainstay at Michigan since Fritz Crisler arrived in the late 1930s. In its place, Elliott installed an offense which he referred to as the "winged-T."

=== 1959 to 1963 seasons ===
On September 26, 1959, the Elliott years officially got underway with a home game against the Missouri Tigers. The Tigers upset the Wolverines, 20–15. The following week, the Wolverines were again defeated in a home game against Michigan State by a score of 34–8. The 1959 team finished with a record of 4–5, including victories over rivals Minnesota and Ohio State. Fred Julian led the 1959 team with 289 rushing yards, and quarterback Stan Noskin led the team in total offense with 697 passing yards. The 1959 season was regarded as "not bad for a rebuilding year," and the team's 4–5 record was an improvement on the prior two-win season. A post-season appraisal by the Associated Press referred to the 1959 Wolverines as "resurgent" and "scrappy." Elliott called it "an encouraging and enjoyable year" and noted that his team was "able to give almost every team we played a real contest."

In 1960, the team again showed improvement, compiling a 5–4 record and outscoring opponents by a total of 133 to 84. Bennie McRae led the team with 342 rushing yards, and quarterback Dave Glinka totaled 755 passing yards.

The rebuilding process continued in 1961 as the team improved to a 6–3 record and outscored opponents 212 to 163. For the first time in the Elliott years, a Michigan player was selected as an All-Big Ten player, with Bennie McRae being picked as an All-Big Ten halfback. Dave Raimey led the team with 496 rushing yards, and quarterback Dave Glinka added 588 passing yards.

The steady improvement in the team's record was reversed in 1962, which marked a low point in the Elliott years. Before the season began, the team lost three of its best offensive players, end John Henderson, fullback Bruce McLenna, and kicker Doug Bickle, to injuries. The 1962 Michigan team compiled a 2–7 record (1–6 Big Ten), finished dead last in the conference, and was outscored 214 to 70. The delta of −144 between points scored and points allowed marked the worst performance in the history of Michigan football, exceeding the previous record of −122 set by the 1934 team. (The 2008 team compiled a −104 delta for third worst in school history.) Dave Raimey led the team with 385 rushing yards, and quarterback Bob Chandler added 401 passing yards.

The Wolverines continued to struggle in 1963, compiling a 3–4–2 record and finishing in a tie for fifth place in the Big Ten. In the second game of the season, the Wolverine fell, 26–13, to a Navy team that was ranked No. 6 in the AP Poll and led by Roger Staubach. Staubach's performance in the game (94 rushing yards and 14 of 16 passing for 237 yards) was called "one of the most remarkable performances in the 36-year history of Michigan Stadium." The defense improved substantially in 1963, allowing 127 points in nine games, but the offense was limited to 131 points in those same games. Quarterback Bob Timberlake showed promise with 593 passing yards and 228 rushing yards. Two Michigan linemen, Tom Keating and Joe O'Donnell, became the second and third Michigan players to be named to All-Big Ten teams during the Elliott years.

At the end of Elliott's first five years as head coach, Michigan had compiled an overall record of 20–23–2 and finished no higher than fifth place in the Big Ten Conference. No Michigan football players received All-America honors during those years.

=== 1964 season ===
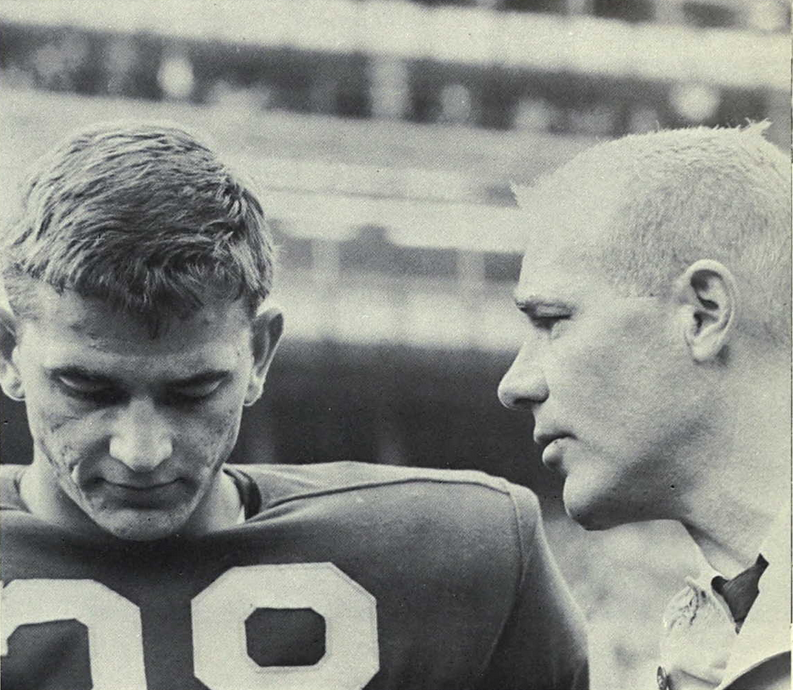
Quarterback Bob Timberlake confers with Bump Elliott in 1964.

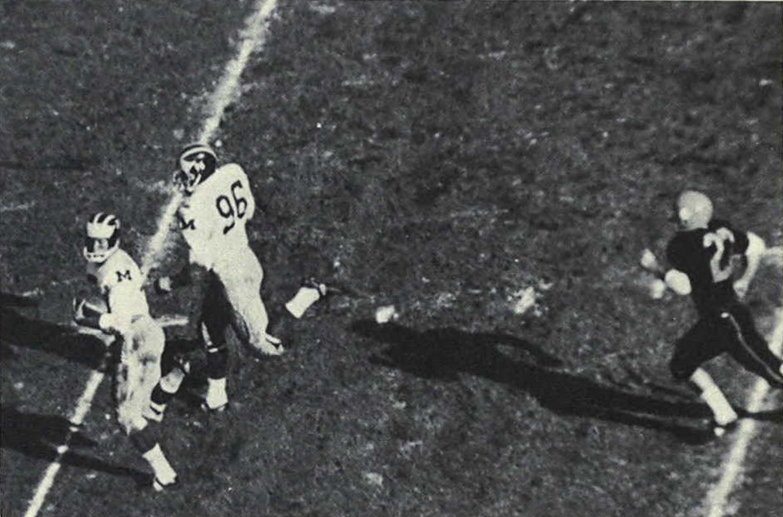
Mel Anthony runs 84 yards for a record-setting touchdown in the 1965 Rose Bowl.

In its sixth year under Bump Elliott, the 1964 Michigan team compiled a 9–1 record and won the Big Ten Conference championship for the first time since 1950. Although no post-bowl polls were taken in the 1964 season, the Wolverines finished the regular season ranked No. 4 in both the AP and UPI polls.

In the second game of the season, Michigan avenged its 1963 loss to Navy and 1963 Heisman Trophy winner Roger Staubach. Navy came into the game ranked No. 5 in the country. This time, the Wolverines were able to stop Staubach and won the game, 21–0. Michigan intercepted three Navy passes, including two thrown by Staubach. Staubach was eventually forced from the game, limping after being knocked to the turf by Michigan defensive tackle Bill Yearby. The game broke a 20-game streak during which the Midshipmen had not been shut out under Staubach. The New York Times wrote that the Wolverines "brought Roger Staubach, the heroic middie quarterback, back into focus as an ordinary mortal."

The 1964 team narrowly missed an undefeated season, with its only loss coming against a Purdue team led by Bob Griese. The Wolverines lost to Purdue by a score of 21–20. Michigan had a chance to tie the game in the fourth quarter, but quarterback Bob Timberlake carried the ball for an attempted two-point conversion and was stopped short of the goal line.

On offense, Timberlake was a triple threat who rushed for 631 yards, passed for 884 yards, and also handled field goals and extra points. He won the Chicago Tribune Silver Football award as the most valuable player in the conference and was selected as an All-American. The 1964 team also had a strong running game with Mel Anthony and Carl Ward in the backfield. The Wolverines rushed for 2,473 yards in 1964 and had four games (Air Force, Minnesota, Northwestern, and Oregon State) in which they rushed for over 300 yards.

On defense, Michigan registered three shutouts (a feat not accomplished by a Michigan team since 1948) and gave up only 83 points, an average of 8.3 points per game. Team leaders on defense included All-American defensive tackle Bill Yearby, All-Big Ten linebacker Tom Cecchini, and team captain and All-Big Ten end Jim Conley.

=== 1965 Rose Bowl ===
As the Big Ten champions, the Wolverines advanced to the 1965 Rose Bowl, defeating Oregon State by a score of 34–7. Michigan fullback Mel Anthony was awarded the Player of the Game trophy after scored three touchdowns, including an 84-yard run in the second quarter that set a Rose Bowl record. Oregon State coach Tommy Prothro opined after watching game film from the Rose Bowl that the 1964 Wolverines were "the greatest football team he has ever seen."

=== 1965 to 1967 seasons ===
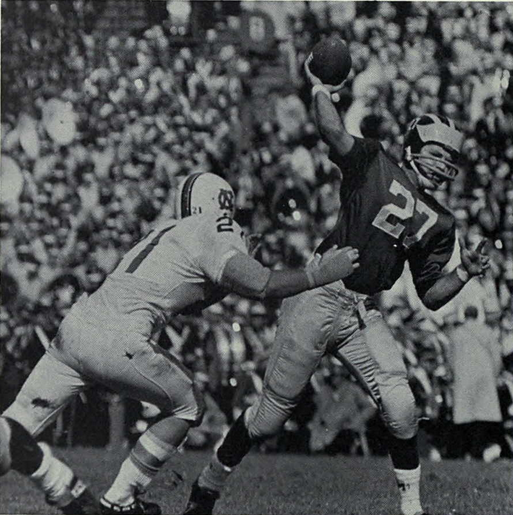
Quarterback Dick Vidmer set a Michigan record with 1,609 passing yards in 1966.

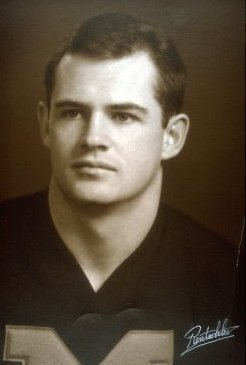
End Jack Clancy set a Michigan record with 1,077 receiving yards in 1966.

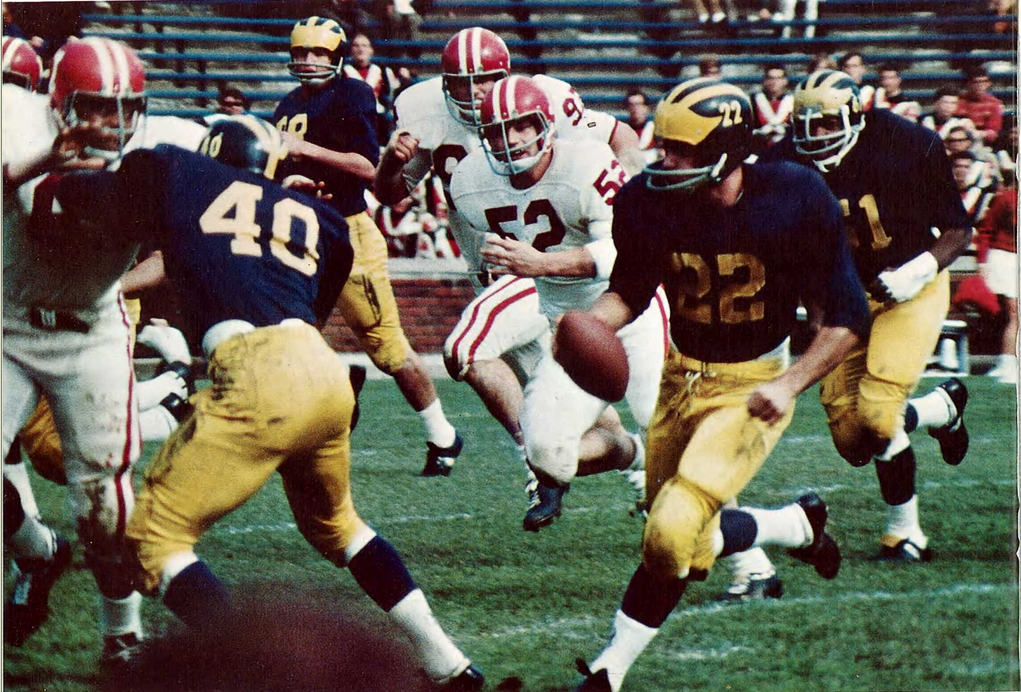
Quarterback Dennis Brown carries the ball in 1967.

After winning a Big Ten championship in 1964, and then opening the 1965 season with two victories, the 1965 team was ranked No. 4 in the AP Poll after two weeks of play. However, the team was crippled by multiple injuries and lost six of the eight remaining games. The 1965 team ultimately compiled a 4–6 record and tied for seventh place in the conference. Carl Ward led the team with 639 rushing yards, and quarterback Wally Gabler passed for 825 yards.

The 1966 team improved to 6–4 and tied for third place in the conference standings. The team featured the strongest passing attack in Michigan history to that point. Quarterback Dick Vidmer shattered Michigan's single-season records by completing 117 of 225 passes for 1,609 yards and 10 touchdowns. Vidmer's favorite target was Jack Clancy who caught 76 passes for 1,077 yards in 1966. After starting the season with impressive victories over Oregon State (41–0) and No. 7-ranked California (17–7), the Wolverines were ranked No. 9 in the AP Poll. Three straight losses dropped the team out of the national rankings. In the final game of the season, the Wolverines defeated rival Ohio State, 17–3. Dave Fisher led the 1966 team with 672 rushing yards. Two Wolverines were selected as All-Americans in 1966: safety Rick Volk and end Jack Clancy. A record five Michigan players were selected as All-Big Ten players in 1966: Volk, Clancy, right guard Don Bailey, halfback Jim Detwiler, fullback Dave Fisher, and linebacker Frank Nunley.

The 1967 team lost five of its first six games, compiled a 4–6 record, and tied for fifth place in the Big Ten standings. Ron Johnson led the team with 982 rushing yards, while quarterback Dennis Brown led the team in total offense with 928 passing yards and 358 rushing yards. Center Joe Dayton, linebacker Tom Stincic, and Ron Johnson were selected as All-Big Ten players in 1967.

=== 1968 season ===
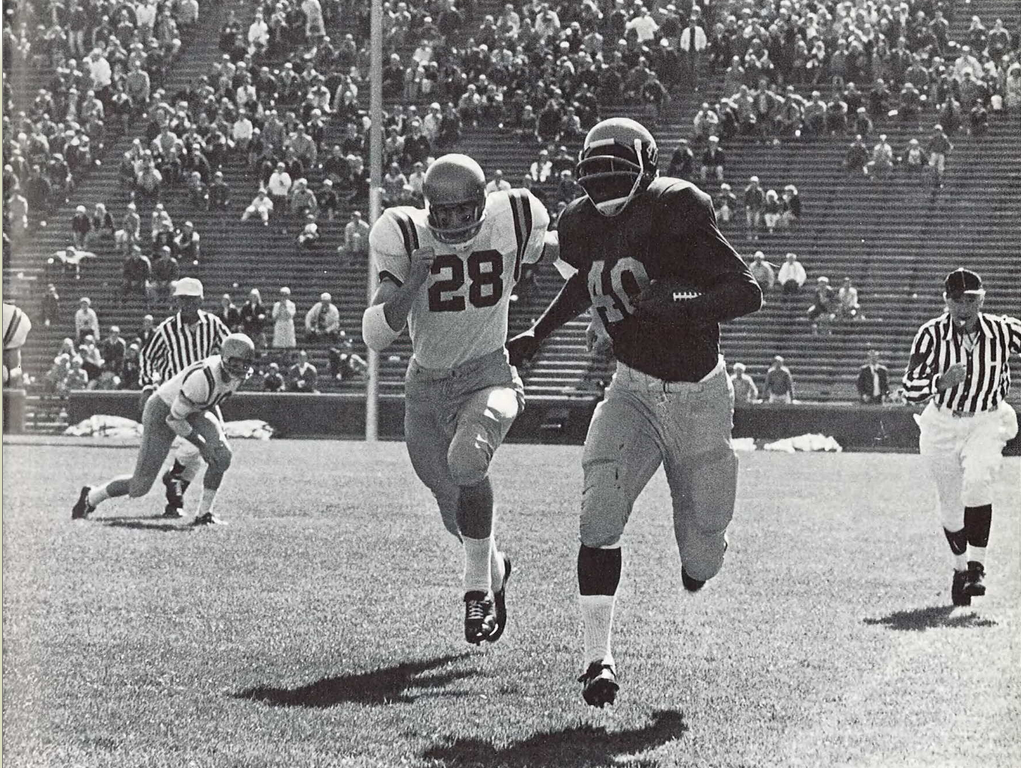
Ron Johnson rushes for 270 yards against Navy in 1967.

Michigan opened the 1968 season with a disappointing 21–7 loss at home in Ann Arbor to the California Golden Bears. After the season opener, the team won eight consecutive games, including a 28–14 victory over a Michigan State team that was ranked No. 12 in the AP Poll and a 27–22 victory over an Indiana team that was ranked No. 19 in the AP Poll. By mid-November, the Wolverines were ranked No. 4 in both the AP and UPI polls. On November 16, 1968, running back Ron Johnson rushed for 347 yards against Wisconsin, a mark that still stands as Michigan's single-game rushing record. Johnson rushed for a total of 1,391 yards in 1968, setting a season rushing record that stood until broken by Rob Lytle in 1976. Quarterback Dennis Brown added 1,562 passing yards and 215 rushing yards.

In the final game of the 1968 season, Michigan faced Ohio State. Michigan came into the game ranked No. 4, and Ohio State was undefeated and ranked No. 2. Ohio State won the game by a 50–14 score. Despite having a 36-point lead, Ohio State coach Woody Hayes passed for, and failed to get, a two-point conversion after the final score and with 1:23 remaining in the game. When asked why he went for the two-point conversion, Hayes reportedly said, "Because we couldn't go for three!" The 1968 Buckeyes went on to defeat USC in the 1969 Rose Bowl and were recognized as national champions in both the AP and UPI polls.

The 1968 Michigan team included a core of young players (Dan Dierdorf, Jim Mandich, Don Moorhead, Tom Curtis, Marty Huff, Henry Hill, and Cecil Pryor) who became stars in the early years of the Schembechler era.

=== Resignation of Elliott ===
In late December 1968, Elliott resigned as head coach and accepted a new position as Michigan's associate athletic director. Less than a week later, Bo Schembechler was announced as Elliott's replacement.

There were reports during the 1968 season that Elliott had been given an ultimatum: "Either win or face the possibility of being kicked upstairs." Don Canham, who took over as athletic director in 1968, later denied that Elliott was "eased out" of his job. Canham said: "Bump and I are close personal friends. Bump is not naïve – he knows that when you work at a place for 10 years and you're not winning consistently, it doesn't become fun for anybody – the coach, the alumni, the players or anybody else. We talked about this and we talked about it openly. If Bump had said to me, 'Look, give me a couple of more years,' I would have given it to him. I mean that. I didn’t fire Bump Elliott. My first year as director Bump had an 8 and 2 record. Anyone could live with that."

Schembechler later recalled that he remained loyal to Elliott when he took over as Michigan's head coach. When Schembechler's 1969 team won the Big Ten championship, he said, "I made certain I let everyone know I won with Bump's kids. Bump was a man of great class and he showed it to me again and again in that first year, never getting in the way, always trying to be helpful, always trying to encourage me." After Michigan won the 1969 Ohio State game, the team presented the game ball to Elliott, and Schembechler noted that "I don't remember when I felt happier about anything in my life." After two years as Michigan's associate athletic director, Elliott was hired as Iowa's athletic director in 1970.

== Rivalries ==
Elliott was the first head coach in Michigan history to compile losing records in all three of Michigan's principal rivalries with Michigan State, Minnesota, and Ohio State. Elliott compiled an overall record of 9–20–1 in those series.

=== Michigan State ===
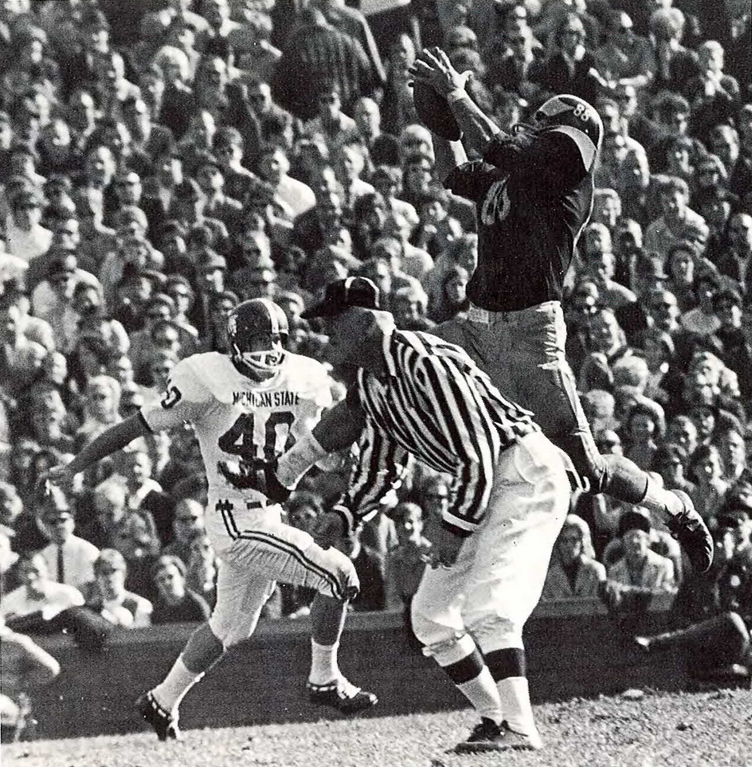
Jim Mandich makes a catch against the Spartans in 1967.

During the Elliott years, Michigan compiled a 2–7–1 record in the Michigan – Michigan State football rivalry. Duffy Daugherty was the head coach of Michigan State throughout the Elliott years. Significant games during the Elliott-Daugherty years include:

- In 1960, Dennis Fitzgerald set a Michigan record with a 99-yard kickoff return for a touchdown in the second quarter, and the Wolverines led, 17–14, at halftime. With less than three minutes remaining in the game, Carl Charon scored a touchdown for Michigan State to give the Spartans a 24–17 victory.
- In 1961 and 1962, Michigan State shut out Michigan by identical scores of 28–0.
- In 1964, Michigan came into the Michigan State game having last beaten a Michigan State team in 1955—the Wolverines' longest winless streak in their in-state rivalry. The game matched two teams ranked in the Top 10 in the AP Poll and attracted "the largest crowd ever assembled at Spartan Stadium" up to that time. Trailing 10 to 3 halfway through the fourth quarter, Michigan scored 14 points in the final seven minutes in a comeback led by sophomore halfback Rick Sygar. With seven minutes remaining, Sygar caught a five-yard touchdown pass from Bob Timberlake. On the final drive, he took a pitch from Timberlake at the Michigan State 31-yard line and threw a touchdown pass to John Henderson. Having missed a two-point conversion attempt on the first Michigan touchdown, Timberlake threw to Steve Smith for the two-point conversion on the final score. Michigan defeated the Spartans 17–10.
- In 1965, the Wolverines lost by a 24–7 score to a Michigan State team that went on to be recognized as national champions in the UPI Coaches Poll.
- In 1966, the Wolverines lost by a 20–7 score to a Michigan State team that compiled an undefeated 9–0–1 record (7–0 Big Ten). The only blemish on the record of the 1966 Spartans was a tie with No. 1 Notre Dame.
- In 1968, Michigan ended a three-game losing streak to Michigan State. The Spartans entered the game ranked No. 12 in the AP poll but fell to the Wolverines by a score of 28 to 14.

=== Minnesota ===
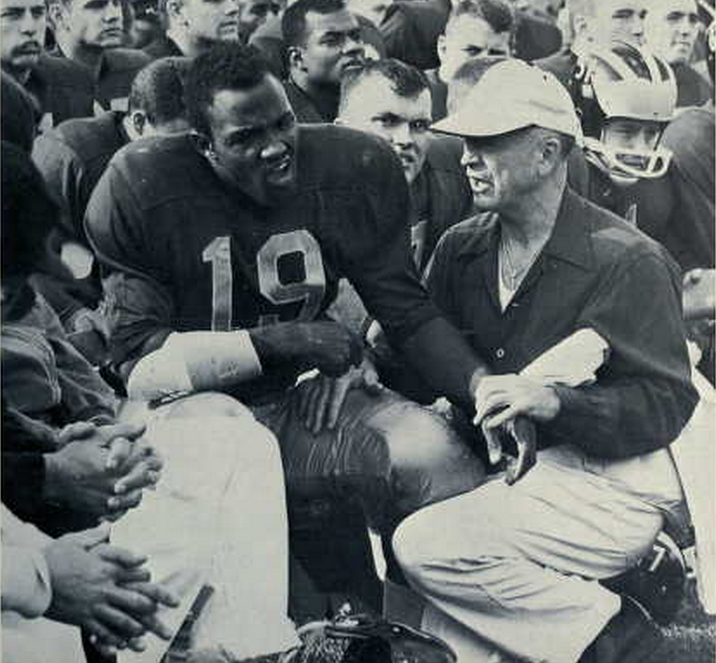
Dave Raimey in 1963

During the Elliott years, Michigan compiled a 4–6 record in its annual Little Brown Jug rivalry game with the Minnesota Golden Gophers. Murray Warmath was the head coach at Minnesota throughout the Elliott years. Significant games during the Elliott-Warmath years include:

- In 1960, Minnesota defeated Michigan 10–0 in Ann Arbor. The 1960 Golden Gophers went on to win the Big Ten championship but lost to Washington in the 1961 Rose Bowl.
- In 1964, Michigan defeated Minnesota 19–12 in Ann Arbor. Prior to 1964, Michigan had lost four consecutive games to Minnesota. Michigan led the game 19–0 in the fourth quarter and held off a comeback attempt by the Golden Gophers. Minnesota scored two fourth-quarter touchdowns, but missed twice on two-point conversion attempts. The Golden Gophers closed the score to 19–12 on a 91-yard interception return by Kraig Lofquist. They subsequently drove to the Michigan three-yard line, but the Michigan defense held on fourth down.
- In 1967, Minnesota beat Michigan, 20–15, in Minneapolis. The 1967 Golden Gophers went on to tie with Indiana for the Big Ten championship.

=== Ohio State ===
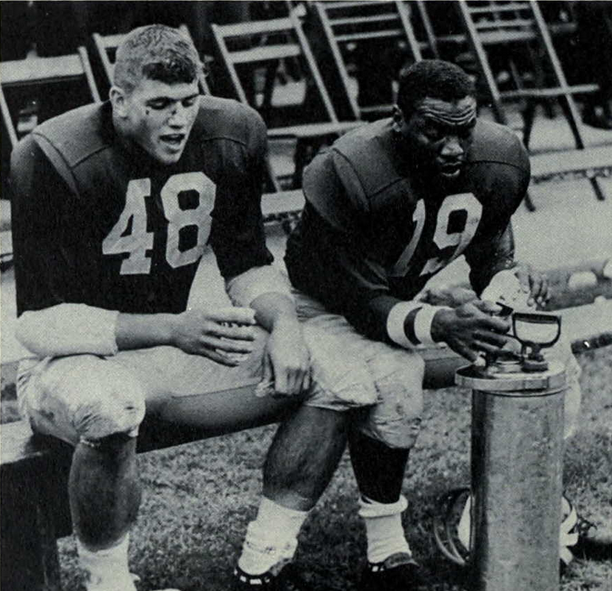
Starters Jim Detwiler and Carl Ward on the sidelines in 1964

During the Elliott years, Michigan compiled a 3–7 record in the Michigan–Ohio State football rivalry. Woody Hayes was the head coach at Ohio State throughout the Elliott years. Significant games during the Elliott-Hayes years include:

- In 1959, Michigan won its first game against Ohio State during the Elliott years. The Wolverines defeated the Buckeyes, 23–13, in front of a capacity crowd of 90,093 spectators at Michigan Stadium. After Ohio State fumbled the opening kickoff, Michigan scored on a touchdown pass from Stan Noskin to Tony Rio with only one minute and ten seconds having been played. Michigan scored additional touchdowns on runs by Noskin and Rio.
- In 1961, Ohio State came into the game ranked No. 2 in the AP Poll behind Alabama. The Buckeyes defeated the Wolverines, 50–20, in Ann Arbor. Despite taking a large lead, Woody Hayes kept his first-string players in the game. The Toledo Blade wrote that Hayes' desire to impress pollsters and to establish Bob Ferguson as the Heisman Trophy winner "precluded showing a trace of mercy to a badly crippled Michigan team, hurt by the absence of several first stringers." Hayes noted, "It was a question of being No. 1 or No. 2 in the country and we want to be No. 1. A couple of extra touchdowns wouldn't hurt Michigan." Despite an 8–0–1 record and the one-sided score against Michigan, the Buckeyes were unable to overtake Alabama and finished the season ranked No. 2 in the AP and UPI polls.
- In 1963, the Michigan – Ohio State game was set for November 23, but President John F. Kennedy was assassinated on November 22. The game was postponed after a request from Michigan Governor George W. Romney to allow mourning for President Kennedy. When the game was played a week later, it attracted a crowd of 36,424, the smallest at Michigan Stadium in 20 years. Michigan took a 10–0 lead, but Ohio State scored 14 unanswered points. Michigan drove to Ohio State's seven-yard-line with less than two minutes remaining, but a pass into the end zone on fourth down fell out of the hands of halfback Dick Rindfuss.
- In 1964, Michigan concluded its regular season with a 10–0 victory over Ohio State in Columbus. The game was played with winds blowing at 23 miles an hour and temperatures in the low 20s. Michigan scored its first touchdown on a 17-yard touchdown pass from Bob Timberlake to Jim Detwiler with 44 seconds remaining in the first half. The touchdown followed a 50-yard punt by Stan Kempe. Ohio State's Bo Rein lost the punt in the sun, fumbled, and the ball was recovered by John Henderson. The only other points in the game came on a 27-yard field goal by Timberlake. With the victory, Michigan won the Big Ten Conference championship for the first time in 14 years.
- In 1965, Ohio State defeated Michigan, 9–7, on a field goal by Bob Funk with 1:15 remaining in the game. Michigan then drove the ball to Ohio State's 34-yard-line with 10 seconds remaining. A 50-yard field goal attempt by Paul D'Eramo fell short.
- In 1966, Michigan defeated Ohio State, 17–3, as Toledo native Jim Detwiler rushed for 140 yards and a touchdown. Dick Vidmer also threw a touchdown pass to Clayton Wilhite. The defeat gave Ohio State a losing record for only the second time in the Woody Hayes era.
- In 1968, Michigan came into the game ranked No. 4, and Ohio State was undefeated and ranked No. 2. Ohio State won the game by a 50–14 score. Despite having a 36-point lead, Ohio State coach Woody Hayes passed for, and failed to get, a two-point conversion with 1:23 remaining in the game. When asked why he went for the two points, Hayes reportedly said, "Because we couldn't go for three!" The 1968 Buckeyes went on to defeat USC in the 1969 Rose Bowl and were recognized as national champions in both the AP and UPI polls.

=== Illinois ===
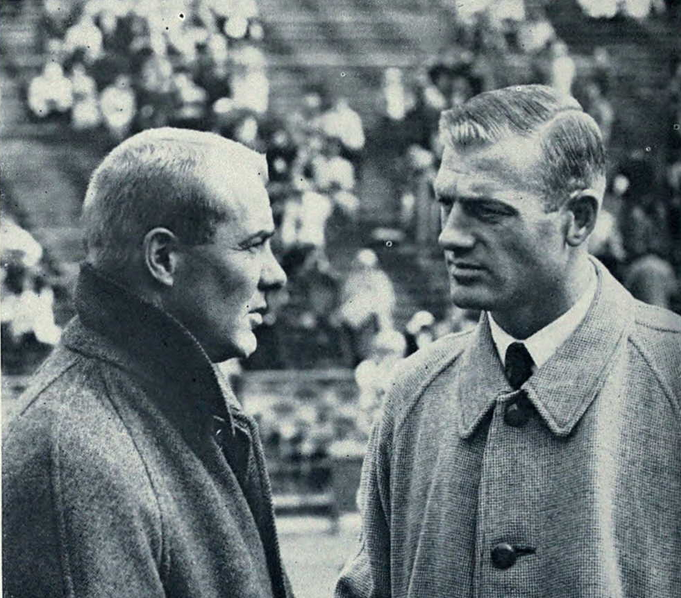
Bump Elliott and Pete Elliott in 1960

From 1960 to 1966, Michigan's games against Illinois took on heightened significance as the games matched Bump Elliott against his brother Pete Elliott, who was Illinois' head coach. The Elliott brothers had played together on the undefeated 1947 Michigan Wolverines football team and were both later inducted into the College Football Hall of Fame. In the seven games matching the two brothers against each other, Michigan compiled a record of 6–1. In his history of the Michigan football program, former publicity director Will Perry joked about the Elliott years: "Two things were becoming clear about Michigan football. There would be injuries, and Bump Elliott's team would beat Pete Elliott's Illinois team."

=== Notre Dame ===
Michigan and Notre Dame did not play each other during the Elliott years. After playing against each other in 1942 and 1943, the programs did not meet again until 1978.

== Coaching staff and administration ==
=== Assistant coaches ===
- William Dodd – assistant coach, 1966–1968
- Don Dufek, Sr. – player, 1948–1950; assistant coach, 1954–1965 (later athletic director at Grand Valley State, 1972–1976, and at Kent State, 1976–1980)
- Dennis Fitzgerald – player, 1959–1960; assistant coach, 1963–1968 (later head coach of Kent State, 1975–1977, assistant coach for the Pittsburgh Steelers, 1982–1988)
- Henry Fonde – player, 1945–1947; assistant coach, 1959–1968
- Jack Fouts – assistant coach, 1959–1963 (later head coach of Ohio Wesleyan, 1964–1983, and Cornell, 1989)
- Bob Hollway – player, 1947–1948; assistant coach, 1954–1965 (later head coach of the St. Louis Cardinals, 1971–1972)
- Don James – assistant coach, 1966–1967 (later head coach at Kent State, 1971–1974, and Washington, 1975–1992)
- Frank Maloney – assistant coach, 1968–1973 (later head coach at Syracuse, 1974–1980)
- George Mans – player, 1959–1961; assistant coach, 1966–1973 (later head coach at Eastern Michigan, 1974–1975)
- Tony Mason – assistant coach, 1964–1968 (later head coach at Cincinnati, 1973–1976, and Arizona, 1977–1979)
- Y C McNease – assistant coach 1966–1967 (later head coach at Idaho, 1968–1969)
- Jack Nelson – assistant coach, 1959–1965 (later head coach at Gustavus Adolphus, 1966–1970, assistant coach for Minnesota Vikings, 1971–1978)
- Robert Shaw – assistant coach, 1968

=== Others ===
- Don Canham – athletic director, 1968–1988
- Fritz Crisler – athletic director, 1941–1968
- Jim Hunt – trainer, 1947–1967
- Lindsy McLean – trainer, 1968–1978 (later trainer of the San Francisco 49ers, 1979–2003)
- Marcus Plant – University of Michigan's faculty representative to the National Collegiate Athletic Association and the Big Ten Conference, 1954–1978

== Players ==
| Name | Start Year | Last Year | Position(s) | Notes |
|---|---|---|---|---|
| Mel Anthony | 1962 | 1964 | Fullback | MVP 1965 Rose Bowl; Played 2 years in the CFL with the Tiger-Cats and Alouettes |
| Donald A. Bailey | 1964 | 1966 | Guard | U.S. Congress, 1979–1983; Auditor General of Pennsylvania, 1985–1989; Awarded Silver Star, 3 Bronze Stars, and Army Air Medal for service in Vietnam War |
| Mike Bass | 1964 | 1966 | Defensive back | Played 8 seasons in the NFL with the Lions and Redskins; 30 NFL interceptions; Scored Redskins' only points in Super Bowl VII |
| Jim Betts | 1968 | 1970 | Quarterback, safety | |
| Dennis Brown | 1966 | 1968 | Quarterback | All-Big Ten 1968; Broke Big Ten single game record for total offense in his first start; Broke most Michigan passing records; Later an assistant coach at Michigan, West Virginia, Arizona State |
| Tom Cecchini | 1963 | 1965 | Linebacker | Head coach at Xavier, 1972–73; defensive line coach for Minnesota Vikings, 1980–83 |
| Jack Clancy | 1963 | 1966 | Wide receiver | All-American 1966; Set Michigan career, season and single-game records for receptions and receiving yards; Still holds record for receiving yards (197) in a game; Played 4 years in the NFL with the Dolphins and Packers |
| Garvie Craw | 1967 | 1969 | Fullback, Halfback | Scored 2 of Michigan's 3 touchdowns in the 1969 Ohio State game |
| Tom Curtis | 1967 | 1969 | Safety | All-American 1969; Played 2 years in the NFL for the Colts; Inducted into the College Football Hall of Fame in 2005 |
| Donald R. Deskins | 1958 | 1959 | Tackle | Played in all 14 games for the Oakland Raiders in their first season (1960); later became an author and professor of urban geography and sociology |
| Jim Detwiler | 1964 | 1966 | Halfback | All-Big Ten first-team player, 1964–1966 |
| Dan Dierdorf | 1968 | 1970 | Offensive tackle | Six-time Pro Bowl selection; NFL 1970s All-Decade team; inducted into Pro and College Football Hall of Fame |
| Dave Fisher | 1964 | 1966 | Fullback | All-Big Ten 1966 |
| Dennis Fitzgerald | 1959 | 1960 | Halfback | Holds Michigan record with 99-yard kickoff return; MVP 1960 Michigan football team; also a championship wrestler; later coached at Kent State and Pittsburgh Steelers |
| Wally Gabler | 1964 | 1965 | Quarterback | Played 7 years in the CFL for the Argonauts, Blue Bombers and Tiger-Cats; 13,080 passing yards in the CFL |
| George Genyk | 1957 | 1959 | Guard, Tackle | 1959 team captain; drafted by New York Titans in the first AFL draft |
| Dave Glinka | 1960 | 1962 | Quarterback | Completed 107 of 237 passes for 1,394 yards, 10 touchdowns and 17 interceptions |
| Tom Goss | 1964 | 1968 | Defensive end | Served as Michigan's athletic director 1997 -2000 |
| Mike Hankwitz | 1966 | 1969 | | Later served as a defensive coordinator at Western Michigan (1982–1984), Colorado (1985–1994, 2004–2005), Kansas (1995–1996), Texas A&M (1997–2002), Arizona (2003), and Northwestern (2008–2012) |
| Darrell Harper | 1957 | 1959 | Halfback | Later played for the Buffalo Bills (1960) |
| John Henderson | 1962 | 1964 | End | Played 8 years in the NFL with the Lions and Vikings |
| Henry Hill | 1968 | 1970 | Defensive guard, Offensive guard | All-American 1970; MVP 1970 Michigan football team; Came to Michigan as a walk-on |
| George Hoey | 1967 | 1968 | Halfback | Later played for the St. Louis Cardinals (1971), New England Patriots (1972–1973), San Diego Chargers (1974), Denver Broncos (1975), and New York Jets (1975) |
| Marty Huff | 1968 | 1970 | Linebacker | First-team All-American, 1970; later played for the San Francisco 49ers (1972), Edmonton Eskimos (1973), and Charlotte Hornets (WFL) (1974–1975) |
| Ron Johnson | 1966 | 1968 | Halfback | First-team All-American, 1968; Set NCAA single-game rushing record (347 yards); Inducted into the College Football Hall of Fame, 1992; Played 8 seasons in the NFL for the Browns, Giants and Cowboys |
| Fred Julian | 1957 | 1959 | Defensive back | Leading rusher for Michigan, 1959; led New York Titans in interceptions 1960 |
| Bill Keating | 1964 | 1965 | Guard | Later played for the Denver Broncos (1966–1967) and Miami Dolphins (1967) |
| Tom Keating | 1961 | 1963 | Tackle | Most Valuable Player for Michigan in 1963; later played for the Buffalo Bills (1964–1965), Oakland Raiders (1966–1972), Pittsburgh Steelers (1973), and Kansas City Chiefs (1974–1975) |
| Bill Laskey | 1962 | 1964 | End | Later played for the Buffalo Bills (1965), Oakland Raiders (1966–1970), Baltimore Colts (1971–1972), and Denver Broncos (1973–1975) |
| Tom Mack | 1963 | 1965 | Offensive tackle | Later played for the Los Angeles Rams (1966–1978); 11-time Pro Bowl selection; inducted into Pro Football Hall of Fame |
| Frank Maloney | 1959 | 1961 | Center, Guard | Later served as the head football coach at Syracuse University |
| Jim Mandich | 1967 | 1969 | End | Later played for the Miami Dolphins (1970–1977), Pittsburgh Steelers (1978); inducted into the College Football Hall of Fame |
| George Mans | 1959 | 1961 | End | Later served as an assistant coach at Michigan, 1966–1973, and head coach at Eastern Michigan, 1974–1975 |
| Bruce McLenna | 1961 | 1962 | Halfback, Fullback, End | Later played for the Detroit Lions (1966); killed in 1968 while riding in a military vehicle while serving in Missouri National Guard |
| Bennie McRae | 1959 | 1961 | Halfback | Later played for the Chicago Bears (1962–1970) and New York Giants (1971) |
| Don Moorhead | 1968 | 1970 | Quarterback | Played 5 years in CFL for BC Lions; All-Big Ten quarterback 1970 |
| Pete Newell | 1968 | 1970 | Defensive tackle | Later played for the BC Lions |
| Stan Noskin | 1957 | 1959 | Quarterback | Starting quarterback for the 1959 Michigan team |
| Frank Nunley | 1964 | 1966 | Center, Linebacker | Later played for the San Francisco 49ers (1967–1969) |
| Joe O'Donnell | 1961 | 1963 | Guard | Played 8 years for the Buffalo Bills |
| Dave Porter | 1964 | 1967 | Guard, Tackle | Also a two-time NCAA collegiate wrestling champion; inducted into the University of Michigan Athletic Hall of Honor |
| Cecil Pryor | 1967 | 1969 | Defensive ends | Later played for the Montreal Alouettes and Memphis Grizzlies |
| Tom Pullen | 1965 | 1967 | End | Played 7 years in the Canadian Football League, including 3 Grey Cup championship teams |
| Dave Raimey | 1960 | 1962 | Halfback | Later played for the Cleveland Browns (1964), Winnipeg Blue Bombers (1965–1968), and Toronto Argonauts (1969–1974); inducted into the Canadian Football Hall of Fame in 2000 |
| Tony Rio | 1957 | 1959 | Fullback | Most Valuable Player, 1959 Michigan team |
| Rocky Rosema | 1965 | 1967 | Linebacker | Later played for the St. Louis Cardinals (1968–1971) |
| John Rowser | 1963 | 1966 | Halfback | Later played for the Green Bay Packers (1967–1969), Pittsburgh Steelers (1970–1973), and Denver Broncos (1974–1976) |
| Arnie Simkus | 1962 | 1964 | Tackle | Later played for the New York Jets (1965) and Minnesota Vikings (1967) |
| Steve Smith | 1963 | 1965 | Defensive end, tackle | Later played for the Pittsburgh Steelers (1966), Minnesota Vikings (1968–1970), and Philadelphia Eagles (1971–1974) |
| Paul Staroba | 1968 | 1970 | Wide receiver | Later played for the Cleveland Browns (1972) and Green Bay Packers (1973) |
| Tom Stincic | 1966 | 1968 | Defensive end | Later played for the Dallas Cowboys (1969–1971) and New Orleans Saints (1972) |
| Bob Timberlake | 1962 | 1964 | Quarterback | Chicago Tribune Silver Football, 1964; All-American, 1964; Played in NFL for New York Giants (1965) |
| Dick Vidmer | 1965 | 1967 | Quarterback | Set Michigan record with 2,400 passing yards (now ranks 15th) |
| Rick Volk | 1964 | 1966 | Safety, Cornerback, Halfback, Quarterback, Fullback | All-American,1966; Played 12 years in the NFL for the Colts, Giants and Dolphins; 4-time All-Pro |
| Carl Ward | 1964 | 1966 | Halfback | Played 3 seasons in the NFL for the Cleveland Browns, New Orleans Saints |
| Bill Yearby | 1963 | 1965 | Defensive tackle | Two-time All-American; MVP 1965 Michigan team; Played 1 year in the NFL for the Jets |
