= 1964 Michigan Wolverines football team =

American college football season

1964 Michigan Wolverines football

Big Ten champion Rose Bowl champion

Rose Bowl, W 34–7 vs. Oregon State
- Conference: Big Ten Conference

Ranking
- Coaches: No. 4
- AP: No. 4
- Record: 9–1 (6–1 Big Ten)
- Head coach: Bump Elliott (6th season)
- MVP: Bob Timberlake
- Captain: Jim Conley
- Home stadium: Michigan Stadium

1964 Big Ten Conference football standings
	Conf.					Overall
Team	W		L		T	W		L		T
No. 4 Michigan $	6	–	1	–	0	9	–	1	–	0
No. 9 Ohio State	5	–	1	–	0	7	–	2	–	0
Purdue	5	–	2	–	0	6	–	3	–	0
Illinois	4	–	3	–	0	6	–	3	–	0
Minnesota	4	–	3	–	0	5	–	4	–	0
Michigan State	3	–	3	–	0	4	–	5	–	0
Northwestern	2	–	5	–	0	3	–	6	–	0
Wisconsin	2	–	5	–	0	3	–	6	–	0
Iowa	1	–	5	–	0	3	–	6	–	0
Indiana	1	–	5	–	0	2	–	7	–	0
$ – Conference champion; Rankings from AP Poll

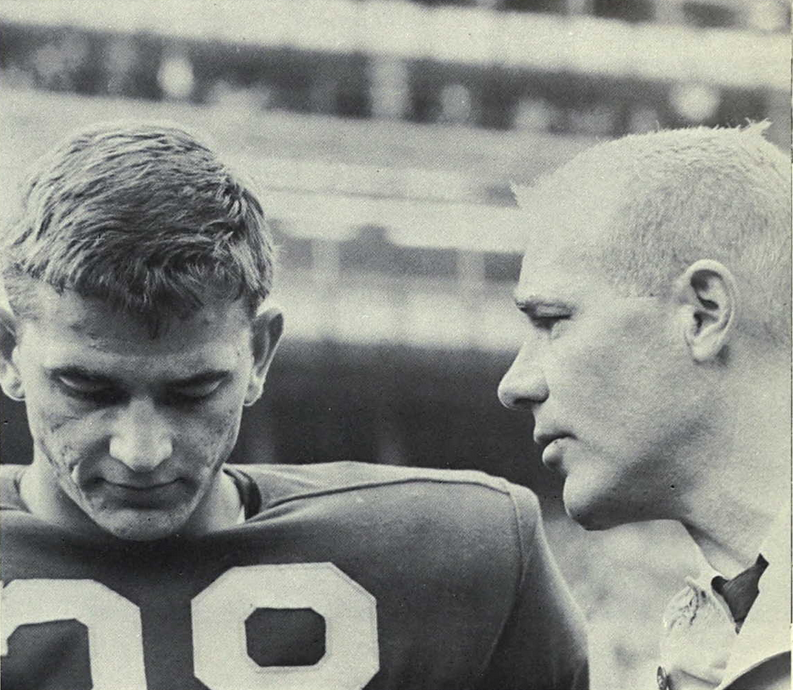
Bob Timberlake confers with Bump Elliott.

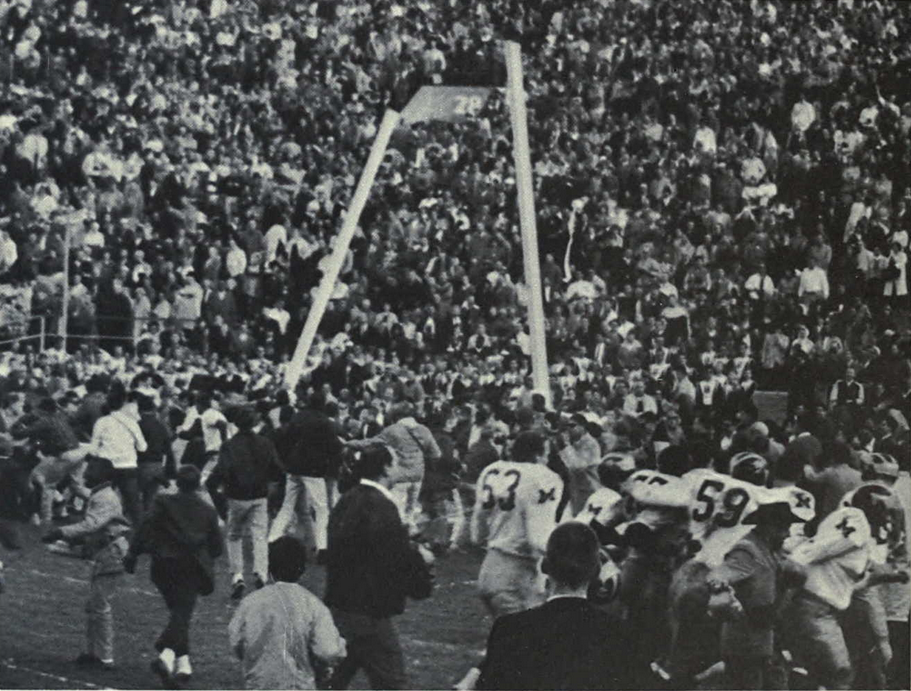
Michigan fans tear down the goal posts after a victory in the 1965 Rose Bowl.

The 1964 Michigan Wolverines football team represented the University of Michigan in the 1964 Big Ten Conference football season. In their sixth year under head coach Bump Elliott, the Wolverines compiled a 9–1 record, won the Big Ten Conference championship for the first time since 1950, and defeated Oregon State in the 1965 Rose Bowl by a score of 34–7. The 1964 Wolverines defeated four teams ranked in the Top 10 in the AP Poll by a combined score of 82 to 17 and finished the regular season ranked No. 4 in both the AP and Coaches' polls. Although no post-bowl polls were taken in the 1964 season, Oregon State coach Tommy Prothro opined after watching game film from the Rose Bowl that the 1964 Wolverines were "the greatest football team he has ever seen."

On offense, Michigan scored 235 points, an average of 23.5 points per game, and averaged 349 yards of total offense per game. The offense was led by quarterback Bob Timberlake who was selected as a first-team All-American. Timberlake was a triple threat who rushed for 631 yards, passed for 884 yards, and also handled field goals and extra points. The 1964 team had a strong running game with Mel Anthony and Carl Ward in the backfield. Totaling 2,473 rushing yards for the season, the Wolverines had four games (Air Force, Minnesota, Northwestern, and Oregon State) in which they rushed for over 300 yards.

On defense, Michigan had three shutouts (a feat not accomplished by a Michigan team since 1948) and gave up only 83 points, an average of 8.3 points per game. Team leaders on defense included All-American defensive tackle Bill Yearby, All-Big Ten linebacker Tom Cecchini, and team captain and All-Big Ten player Jim Conley. The 1964 team also included at least 16 players who went on to play professional football, including offensive guard Tom Mack (13 years in the NFL, 11 Pro Bowl appearances), defensive back Rick Volk (12 years in the NFL, three Pro Bowl appearances), linebacker Frank Nunley (10 years in the NFL), linebacker Bill Laskey (10 years in the AFL/NFL), and defensive back John Rowser (10 years in the NFL).

The Wolverines narrowly missed an undefeated season and potential national championship, with their only loss coming against a Purdue team led by Bob Griese by a score of 21–20. Michigan had a chance to tie the game in the fourth quarter, but Timberlake carried the ball for an attempted two-point conversion and was stopped short of the goal line.

== Schedule ==
Date	Opponent	Rank	Site	TV	Result	Attendance	Source
September 26	Air Force*		Michigan Stadium; Ann Arbor, MI		W 24–7	69,888	
October 3	No. 6 Navy*	No. 8	Michigan Stadium; Ann Arbor, MI		W 21–0	70,608	
October 10	at No. 9 Michigan State	No. 7	Spartan Stadium; East Lansing, MI (rivalry)		W 17–10	78,234	
October 17	Purdue	No. 5	Michigan Stadium; Ann Arbor, MI		L 20–21	60,424	
October 24	Minnesota^{†}		Michigan Stadium; Ann Arbor, MI (Little Brown Jug)	NBC	W 19–12	61,859	
October 31	Northwestern		Michigan Stadium; Ann Arbor, MI (rivalry)		W 35–0	54,615	
November 7	Illinois		Michigan Stadium; Ann Arbor, MI (rivalry)		W 21–6	62,415	
November 14	at Iowa	No. 6	Iowa Stadium; Iowa City, IA		W 34–20	56,791	
November 21	at No. 7 Ohio State	No. 6	Ohio Stadium; Columbus, OH (rivalry)		W 10–0	84,685	
January 1, 1965	vs. No. 8 Oregon State*	No. 4	Rose Bowl; Pasadena, CA (Rose Bowl)	NBC	W 34–7	100,423	
*Non-conference game; ^{†}Homecoming; Rankings from AP Poll released prior to the game; Source:

== Season summary ==
=== Pre-season ===
In the 1962 and 1963 seasons, Michigan compiled a record of 5–11–2 and finished in tenth and seventh place in the Big Ten Conference. The Wolverines had not won a Big Ten Conference championship since 1950. Expectations were higher in 1964 with Michigan returning most of its starters from the 1963 season, including starting quarterback (Bob Timberlake), leading rusher (Mel Anthony), leading receiver (John Henderson), and leading kick returner (Jack Clancy). When some reporters wrote that Michigan should win the Big Ten championship or finish in the top five nationally in 1964, head coach Bump Elliott sought to manage expectations. Elliott stated:

"Some people think we'll be a real good football team but I'll say that's not realistic at this time. . . . I'm not saying there isn't reason for us to be highly optimistic. We have 20 of our top 33 players back, and we'll have a veteran in every spot, two deep in some. But there are a million things to be proven before anyone can point to us as a team that can go all the way. I'd say we'll have a sound, reasonable team, and rating it a dark horse or less is being realistic at this time."

=== Week 1: Air Force ===
Week 1: Air Force at Michigan

Team	1	2	3	4	Total
Air Force (1–0)	0	7	0	0	7
• Michigan (0–0)	7	10	7	0	24

- Date: September 26, 1964
- Location: Michigan Stadium
  Ann Arbor, Michigan
- Game start: 1:30 p.m.
- Game attendance: 69,888

Michigan opened its 1964 season on September 26, 1964, with a 24–7 victory over Air Force. The game drew a crowd of 69,888 to Michigan Stadium for the annual Band Day. On the game's third play, Arnie Simkus recovered an Air Force fumble at the Air Force 35-yard line. Following the turnover, quarterback Bob Timberlake scored on a one-yard touchdown run. Timberlake also led Michigan on two 80-yard touchdown drives as Mel Anthony scored a touchdown on a four-yard run in the second quarter, and Timberlake kicked a 26-yard field goal at the end of the first half. Michigan was aided by four Air Force fumbles in the first half, three of which were recovered by Michigan. The only scoring in the second half came on a 10-yard touchdown sweep by Jim Detwiler.

Michigan gained 311 rushing yards led by Timberlake (80 yards), Anthony (79 yards), Detwiler (72 yards), and Carl Ward (51 yards). Timberlake had 171 yards of total offense (80 rushing, 91 passing) and scored 12 points on a touchdown, a field goal, and three extra points. The defense gave up 230 passing yards, mostly

Statistics	AF	UM
First downs	17	22
Plays–yards	73–307	76–402
Rushes–yards	33–77	61–311
Passing yards	230	91
Passing: comp–att–int	23–40–2	7–15–0
Time of possession	na	na

Team	Category	Player	Statistics
Air Force	Passing	Tim Murphy	21/33, 25 yards, 2 INT
Air Force	Rushing	Czarnota	11 carries, 39 yards
Air Force	Receiving	Czarnota	9 receptions, 84 yards
Michigan	Passing	Bob Timberlake	7/14, 91 yards
Michigan	Rushing	Bob Timberlake	13 carries, 80 yards, 1 TD
Michigan	Receiving	Rindfuss/Smith	1 reception, 25 yards (each)

=== Week 2: Navy ===
Week 2: Navy at Michigan

Team	1	2	3	4	Total
Navy (2–0)	0	0	0	0	0
• Michigan (1–0)	0	6	8	7	21

- Date: October 3, 1964
- Location: Michigan Stadium
  Ann Arbor, Michigan
- Game start: 1:30 p.m.
- Game attendance: 70,608

In the second game of the season, Michigan defeated Navy 21–0. Navy, led by quarterback and 1964 Heisman Trophy winner Roger Staubach, came into the game ranked No. 5 in the country. Michigan lost to Navy the prior year, 26-13.

The game was marked by 11 turnovers, six by Navy and five by Michigan. Navy quarterbacks threw three interceptions, including two by Staubach. Staubach completed 16 of 30 passes for 166 yards. Staubach was eventually forced from the game, limping after being knocked to the turf by Michigan defensive tackle Bill Yearby. The game broke a 20-game streak during which the Midshipmen had not been shut out under Staubach. The New York Times wrote that the Wolverines "brought Roger Staubach, the heroic middie quarterback, back into focus as an ordinary mortal." It was only the second time in 10 years that Navy had been shut out. Michigan coach Bump Elliott credited the defensive effort against Staubach as "the key to the victory."

Sophomore halfback Carl Ward rushed for 74 yards on 18 carries and scored two touchdowns, one in the second quarter and another in the third. Fullback Dave Fisher added a touchdown early in the fourth quarter.

Michigan quarterback Bob Timberlake completed 7 of 11 passes for 106 yards but threw two interceptions. Michigan linebacker Tom Cecchini had two fumble recoveries and an interception in the game.

Statistics	Navy	UM
First downs	20	18
Plays–yards	74–268	73–393
Rushes–yards	39–87	59–272
Passing yards	181	121
Passing: comp–att–int	17–35–3	8–14–3
Time of possession	na	na

Team	Category	Player	Statistics
Navy	Passing	Roger Staubach	16/30, 166 yards, 3 INT
Navy	Rushing	Donnelly	11 carries, 33 yards
Navy	Receiving	Orr	5 receptions, 56 yards
Michigan	Passing	Bob Timberlake	7/11, 106 yards
Michigan	Rushing	Jim Detwiler	11 carries, 77 yards
Michigan	Receiving	Kirby	4 receptions, 46 yards

=== Week 3: at Michigan State ===
Week 3: Michigan at Michigan State

Team	1	2	3	4	Total
• Michigan (2–0)	0	3	0	14	17
Mich. St. (1–1)	7	0	0	3	10

- Date: October 3, 1964
- Location: Spartan Stadium
  East Lansing, Michigan
- Game attendance: 78,234

In the third game of the season, Michigan went on the road to open its Big Ten Conference schedule against Michigan State. Coming into the game, Michigan had lost six straight games to the Spartans and had not defeated them since 1955. The game matched two teams ranked in the Top 10 in the AP Poll and attracted a crowd of 78,234, the largest crowd ever at Spartan Stadium up to that time. Writing in The New York Times, R. W. Apple, Jr., wrote that the intrastate rivalry "means to the people of Michigan what the struggle between the Capulets and Montagues did to the citizens of 15th-century Verona."

Michigan State took the lead in the first quarter after recovering a fumble off an errant pitch from Bob Timberlake to Mel Anthony. Another highlight for Michigan State came when sophomore receiver Gene Washington impressed observers with "a spectacular leaping grab for 43 yards."

Trailing 10 to 3 halfway through the fourth quarter, Michigan scored 14 points in the final seven minutes on a comeback led by sophomore halfback Rick Sygar. With seven minutes remaining, Sygar caught a five-yard touchdown pass from Timberlake. On the final drive, he took a pitch from Timberlake at the Michigan State 31-yard line and threw a touchdown pass to John Henderson. Having missed a two-point conversion attempt on the first Michigan touchdown, Timberlake threw to Steve Smith for the two-point conversion for a 17–10 victory. Mel Anthony rushed for 70 yards on 21 carries, and John Henderson had 82 receiving yards on three catches.

Statistics	MSU	UM
First downs	8	20
Plays–yards	53–157	71–277
Rushes–yards	41–73	52–124
Passing yards	84	153
Passing: comp–att–int	4–12	10–19
Time of possession	na	na

Team	Category	Player	Statistics
MSU	Passing	Juday	3/10, 41 yards
MSU	Rushing	Amnon	12 carries, 34 yards
MSU	Receiving	Gene Washington	1 reception, 43 yards
Michigan	Passing	Bob Timberlake	9/18, 122 yards
Michigan	Rushing	Mel Anthony	21 carries, 70 yards
Michigan	Receiving	John Henderson	3 receptions, 82 yards

=== Week 4: Purdue ===
Week 4: Purdue at Michigan (3–0)

Team	1	2	3	4	Total
• Purdue (1–1–1)	7	7	7	0	21
Michigan	7	7	0	6	20

- Date: October 17, 1964
- Location: Michigan Stadium
  Ann Arbor, Michigan
- Game attendance: 60,924

The Wolverines suffered their only loss in week 4 against the Purdue Boilermakers. In a game played at Michigan Stadium, Purdue won a close game by a score of 21–20. Michigan took the opening kickoff and drove 71 yards for a touchdown and a 7–0 lead. Quarterback Bob Timberlake ran four yards for the opening touchdown and threw a 17-yard touchdown pass to Steve Smith in the second quarter. Timberlake had one of his best games, rushing for 113 yards and two touchdowns on 18 carries and passing for 145 yards and a touchdown. However, the Purdue offense, led by Bob Griese and aided by three Michigan turnovers, scored touchdowns in each of the first three quarters. Griese completed a 66-yard touchdown pass to Jim Morel in the first quarter. Purdue's second touchdown followed a Timberlake fumble after being hit with his arm fully cocked to pass the ball. Purdue recovered at the Michigan 26-yard line and drove for a touchdown to tie the game at 14–14. In the third quarter, Griese threw a three-yard touchdown pass to Randy Minnlear to give the Boilermakers a 21–14 lead.

In its opening drive of the fourth quarter, Michigan drove deep into Purdue territory, but Jim Detwiler fumbled at the three-yard line and Purdue recovered the ball in its own endzone. On the next drive, Bob Timberlake ran 54 yards for a touchdown, and Michigan had the option to kick an extra point to tie the game or go for the lead with a two-point conversion. Coach Elliott called for the two-point conversion; Timberlake carried the ball on an end run but was stopped short of the goal line. Michigan's defense forced punts on the next two Purdue drives, but Michigan was unable to score on its final drives. The Wolverines fumbled on one drive and failed to convert a fourth down on the final drive. The Wolverines lost despite outgaining the Boilermakers 435 yards to 268.

Statistics	PU	UM
First downs	15	22
Plays–yards	64–268	76–433
Rushes–yards	39–119	53–241
Passing yards	149	192
Passing: comp–att–int	10–25	10–23
Time of possession	na	na

Team	Category	Player	Statistics
Purdue	Passing	Bob Griese	10/24, 149 yards
Purdue	Rushing	Minniear	24 carries, 80 yards
Purdue	Receiving	Hadrick	7 reception, 77 yards
Michigan	Passing	Bob Timberlake	9/21, 145 yards
Michigan	Rushing	Bob Timberlake	18 carries, 113 yards
Michigan	Receiving	John Henderson	6 receptions, 95 yards

=== Week 5: Minnesota ===
Week 5: Minnesota at Michigan

Team	1	2	3	4	Total
Minnesota (2–2)	0	0	0	12	12
• Michigan (3–1)	7	3	9	0	19

- Date: October 24, 1964
- Location: Michigan Stadium
  Ann Arbor, Michigan
- Game attendance: 61,859

In the fifth game of the season, Michigan defeated Minnesota 19–12 in Ann Arbor. Before 1964, Michigan had lost four consecutive games in the annual contest for the Little Brown Jug. Michigan led the game 19–0 in the fourth quarter and held off a comeback attempt by the Golden Gophers. Minnesota scored two fourth-quarter touchdowns but missed twice on two-point conversion attempts. The Golden Gophers closed the score to 19–12 on a 91-yard interception return by Kraig Lofquist. They subsequently drove to the Michigan three-yard line, but the Michigan defense held on fourth down.

Michigan gained 311 rushing yards in the game, including 102 yards by Carl Ward, 98 yards by Mel Anthony, and 79 yards by Bob Timberlake. Michigan's scoring came on touchdown runs by Anthony and Timberlake, a field goal, and two extra points by Timberlake, and a safety.

=== Week 6: Northwestern ===
Week 6: Northwestern at Michigan

Team	1	2	3	4	Total
Northwestern (2–4)	0	0	0	0	0
• Michigan (4–1)	7	14	7	7	35

- Date: October 31, 1964
- Location: Michigan Stadium
  Ann Arbor, Michigan
- Game attendance: 54,615

On October 31, 1965, Michigan defeated Northwestern, 35–0, before a crowd of 54,615 in Ann Arbor. The Wolverines totaled 336 rushing yards as eleven players gained positive rushing yardage for Michigan, led by Bob Timberlake (81 yards), Carl Ward (57 yards), Jim Detwiler (50 yards), Mel Anthony (50 yards), and Dave Fisher (44 yards). Timberlake ran for two touchdowns and completed nine of 15 passes for 84 yards, giving him 165 yards of total offense. Timberlake also scored 16 points on two touchdowns and four extra-point kicks. Rick Volk also threw a 33-yard touchdown pass to John Henderson in the second quarter. Michigan's defense held the Wildcats to only 44 rushing yards to give the Wolverines their second shutout of the year. Michigan played 61 players in the course of the game.

Statistics	NW	UM
First downs	14	29
Plays–yards	59–153	80–453
Rushes–yards	32–44	60–336
Passing yards	109	117
Passing: comp–att–int	14–27	10–20
Time of possession	na	na

Team	Category	Player	Statistics
Northwestern	Passing	Myers	14/26, 109 yards
Northwestern	Rushing	McKelvey	10 carries, 49 yards
Northwestern	Receiving	Banaszek	4 reception, 35 yards
Michigan	Passing	Bob Timberlake	9/15, 84 yards
Michigan	Rushing	Bob Timberlake	14 carries, 81 yards
Michigan	Receiving	John Henderson	5 receptions, 69 yards

=== Week 7: Illinois ===
Week 7: Illinois at Michigan

Team	1	2	3	4	Total
Illinois (4–2)	0	6	0	0	6
• Michigan (5–1)	0	14	7	0	21

- Date: November 7, 1964
- Location: Michigan Stadium
  Ann Arbor, Michigan
- Game attendance: 62,415

On November 7, 1964, Michigan defeated Illinois, 21–6, in a nationally televised game before a crowd of 62,415 at Michigan Stadium. After failing to convert a first down in the first quarter, Michigan scored two touchdowns in the second quarter on a run by Carl Ward and a 24-yard pass from Bob Timberlake to Jim Detwiler. Michigan's first touchdown followed an interception by Frank Nunley at the Illinois 35-yard line, and the second touchdown followed a fumble recovery by Gerald Mader. In the third quarter, Timberlake ran the ball for a touchdown from the one-yard line to conclude a 91-yard drive. Timberlake also kicked three extra-point kicks, bringing his scoring total to 66 points on the year. The Illini featured linebacker Dick Butkus and fullback Jim Grabowski.

The game marked the fifth consecutive victory for Michigan coach Bump Elliott against his brother, Illinois coach Pete Elliott. The Elliott brothers played together in the backfield of Michigan's undefeated 1947 team.

Statistics	UI	UM
First downs	14	15
Plays–yards	64–234	66–255
Rushes–yards	40–97	58–202
Passing yards	137	53
Passing: comp–att–int	11–24	5–8
Time of possession	na	na

Team	Category	Player	Statistics
Illinois	Passing	Frank Custardo	11/22, 137 yards, 1 INT
Illinois	Rushing	Jim Grabowski	17 carries, 62 yards
Illinois	Receiving	Bob Trumpy	5 receptions, 89 yards
Michigan	Passing	Bob Timberlake	5/8, 53 yards
Michigan	Rushing	Carl Ward	9 carries, 67 yards
Michigan	Receiving	Jim Detwiler	1 reception, 24 yards

=== Week 8: at Iowa ===
Week 8: Michigan at Iowa

Team	1	2	3	4	Total
• Michigan (6–1)	0	20	14	0	34
Iowa (3–4)	7	6	0	7	20

- Date: November 14, 1964
- Location: Iowa Stadium
  Iowa City, Iowa
- Game attendance: 56,791

In the eighth game of the season, Michigan defeated Iowa on the road 34–20. Michigan took advantage of seven turnovers by Iowa, all inside the Iowa 30-yard line. Mel Anthony rushed for 121 yards and scored three touchdowns on 20 carries. Bob Timberlake contributed 216 yards of total offense with 80 rushing yards and 134 passing yards. Timberlake had a 14-yard touchdown run and also threw a touchdown pass to John Henderson. Despite throwing three interceptions, Iowa quarterback Gary Snook completed 13 passes and broke the Big Ten Conference record for the most pass completions in a season. With six catches in the game, Iowa's Karl Noonan also broke the conference record for most pass receptions in a season.

=== Week 9: at Ohio State ===
Week 9: Michigan at Ohio State

Team	1	2	3	4	Total
• Michigan (7–1)	0	7	0	3	10
Ohio St. (7–1)	0	0	0	0	0

- Date: November 21, 1964
- Location: Ohio Stadium
  Columbus, Ohio
- Game attendance: 84,685

On November 21, Michigan concluded its regular season with a 10–0 victory over Ohio State before a record crowd of 84,685 at Ohio Stadium in Columbus, Ohio. The game was played in strong winds and at 20 degrees Fahrenheit.

The defenses dominated the first half with neither team able to score in the first 29 minutes. With less than two remaining in the half, Michigan's Stan Kempe boomed a 50-yard punt; Ohio State star Bo Rein lost the ball in the wind and sun, bobbled and fumbled the ball. Michigan's John Henderson recovered the loose ball at the Ohio State 20-yard line with 78 seconds remaining in the half. Bob Timberlake scrambled for three yards on the next play and then threw to Jim Detwiler at the six-yard line; Detwiler forced his way past two Ohio State defenders and scored the game's only touchdown.

The defenses continued to dominate in the second half. The only points of the second half came on a 27-yard field goal by Timberlake early in the fourth quarter. Timberlake's field goal was set up by a long punt return by defensive back Rick Volk to the Ohio State 24-yard line. Volk continued with a strong fourth-quarter performance, as he intercepted two passes deep in Michigan territory and knocked another down to stop three Ohio State drives in the fourth quarter. Ohio State's defense limited Michigan's rushing offense (ranked first in the country) to only 115 yards.

With the victory, Michigan won the Big Ten Conference championship and secured an invitation to the Rose Bowl for the first time since the 1950 season. The Michigan Daily described the post-game celebration in Michigan's locker room: "Fully-clad coaches were thrown in the showers by naked football players, players danced around with yellow roses in their mouths, and all was in turmoil in the jubilant Michigan locker room."

Team	Category	Player	Statistics
Michigan	Passing	Bob Timberlake	3/9 for 45 yards
Michigan	Rushing	Bob Timberlake	15 carries, 28 yards
Michigan	Receiving	Jim Detwiler	1 receptions, 18 yards
Ohio	Passing	Don Unverferth	6/20, 69 yards, 2 INT
Ohio	Rushing	Willard Sander	14 carries, 65 yards
Ohio	Receiving	Bo Rein	4 receptions, 69 yards

=== Rose Bowl: Oregon State ===
Rose Bowl: Michigan vs. Oregon State

Team	1	2	3	4	Total
• Michigan (8–1)	0	12	15	7	34
Oregon St. (8–2)	0	7	0	0	7

- Date: January 1, 1965
- Location: Rose Bowl
  Pasadena, California
- Game attendance: 100,423

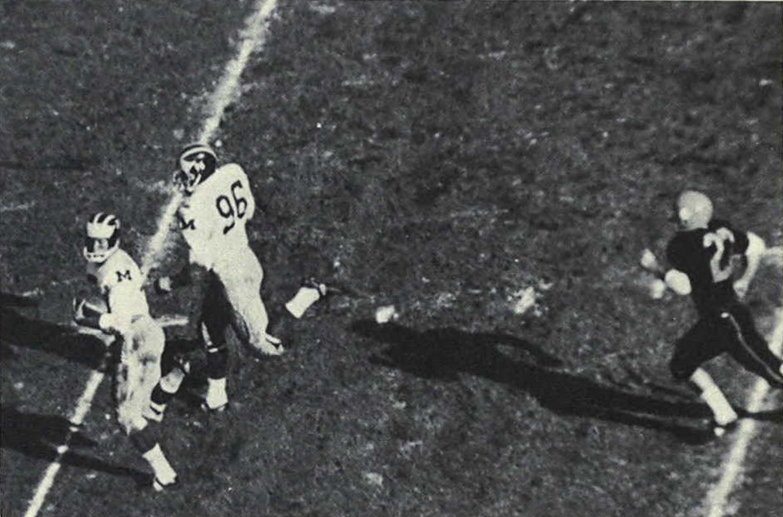
Mel Anthony runs 84 yards for a record-setting touchdown in the 1965 Rose Bowl.

As the Big Ten Conference champion, Michigan played in the 1965 Rose Bowl, defeating the Oregon State Beavers, 34–7. The game marked Michigan's fourth appearance in the Rose Bowl. In its three prior appearances (1902, 1948, and 1951), Michigan was 3–0 and had outscored opponents 112–6. Michigan was selected as an 11-point favorite over Oregon State.

After a scoreless first quarter, Oregon State took a 7–0 lead with a five-yard touchdown pass from Paul Brothers to Doug McDougal. Later in the second quarter, Michigan scored its first touchdown of the game on an 84-yard run by Mel Anthony. Anthony's run broke the Rose Bowl record for the longest run from scrimmage. Dick Sygar missed the extra point, and Oregon State led 7–6. On Michigan's next drive, Carl Ward ran 43 yards for a touchdown. Michigan missed an attempted two-point conversion on an incomplete pass from Timberlake to Ben Farabee, and Michigan led 12–7 at halftime.

In the second half, Michigan's defense shut out the Beavers 22 to 0. Mel Anthony, who scored three touchdowns in the game, was named the Player Of The Game. Michigan totaled 332 rushing yards with 10 players gaining positive rushing yards. Michigan's leading rushers were Mel Anthony (123 yards), Carl Ward (88 yards), Bob Timberlake (57 yards) and Dave Fisher (30 yards). The Michigan defense held Oregon State to 64 rushing yards in the game.

After studying game film from the Rose Bowl, Oregon State coach Tommy Prothro said he was convinced that the 1964 Michigan team was "the greatest football team he has ever seen." Prothro added, "The pictures are really interesting. There were times when our players blasted Michigan players at full speed and only wound up flat on their backs with the other people on top of them. I've never seen such hitting."

== Players ==
=== Statistical leaders ===
==== Rushing ====
Player	Attempts	Net yards	Yards per attempt	Touchdowns
Mel Anthony	145	702	4.8	9
Bob Timberlake	156	631	4.0	9
Carl Ward	101	515	5.1	4
Jim Detwiler	75	298	4.0	1
Dave Fisher	48	205	4.3	2

==== Passing ====
Player	Attempts	Completions	Interceptions	Comp %	Yards	Yds/Comp	TD
Bob Timberlake	137	70	5	51.1	884	12.6	5

==== Receiving ====
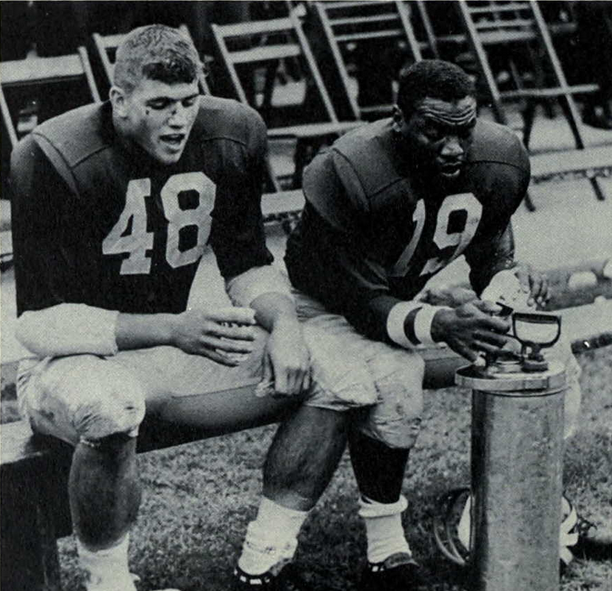
Starters Jim Detwiler and Carl Ward rest late in the Northwestern game.

Player	Receptions	Yards	Yds/Recp	TD	Long
John Henderson	31	377	12.2	3	15
Jim Detwiler	11	214	19.4	2	30
Steve Smith	8	131	16.4	1	25
Ben Farabee	9	96	10.7	0	32

==== Kickoff returns ====
Player	Returns	Yards	Yds/Return	TD	Long
Jim Detwiler	10	225	22.5	0	35
Carl Ward	4	94	23.5	0	32

==== Punt returns ====
Player	Returns	Yards	Yds/Return	TD	Long
Dick Sygar	18	118	6.6	0	10
Dick Rindfuss	8	51	6.4	0	16

=== Starting lineup ===
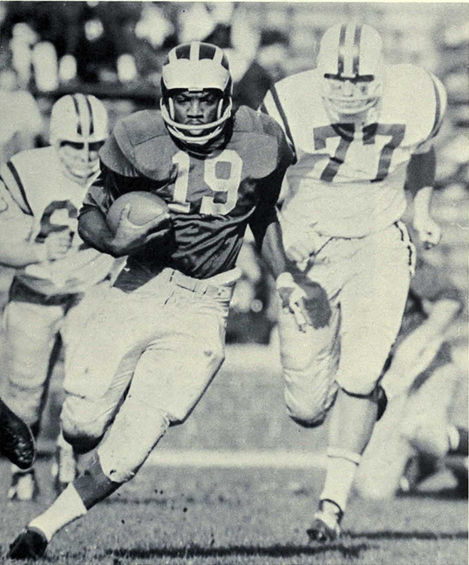
Halfback Carl Ward.

- Mel Anthony, Cincinnati, Roger Bacon H.S. – 6 games at fullback
- David Butler, Detroit, Henry Ford H.S. – 8 games at left guard
- Tom Cecchini, Detroit, Pershing H.S. – 2 games at center
- Jim Conley, Springdale, Pennsylvania – 4 games at left end
- Jim Detwiler, Toledo, Ohio, DeVilbiss H.S. – 6 games at left halfback
- Ben Farabee, Holland, Michigan – 3 games at left end
- John Henderson, Dayton, Ohio, Roosevelt H.S. – 7 games at right end
- Bill Keating, Chicago, St. Patrick's H.S. – 1 game at right guard
- Charles Kines, Niles, Ohio, McKinley H.S. – 8 games at left tackle
- Bill Laskey, Milan, Michigan – 3 games at right end
- Tom Mack, Bucyrus, Ohio, Cleveland Heights H.S. – 7 games at right tackle
- John Marcum, Monroe, Michigan – 8 games at right guard
- Bob Mielke, Chicago, Carl Schurz H.S. – 1 game at right guard
- Frank Nunley, Belleville, Michigan – 1 game at center
- Brian Patchen, Steubenville, Ohio, Catholic Central H.S. – 7 games at center
- Dick Rindfuss, Niles, Ohio, McKinley H.S. – 3 games at right halfback
- Arnie Simkus, Detroit, Cass Tech H.S. – 2 games at left guard
- Stephen C. Smith, Park Ridge, Illinois, Maine East – 3 games at left end
- Dick Sygar, Niles, Ohio, McKinley H.S. – 4 games at fullback
- Bob Timberlake, Franklin, Ohio – 10 games at quarterback
- Rick Volk, Wauseon, Ohio – 4 games at left halfback
- Carl Ward, Cincinnati, Taft H.S. – 6 games at right halfback
- Dick Wells, Grand Rapids, Michigan, Ottawa Hills H.S. – 1 game at right halfback
- John Yanz, Chicago, DeLaSalle H.S. – 2 games at left tackle
- Bill Yearby, Detroit, Eastern H.S. – 3 games at right tackle

=== Awards and honors ===
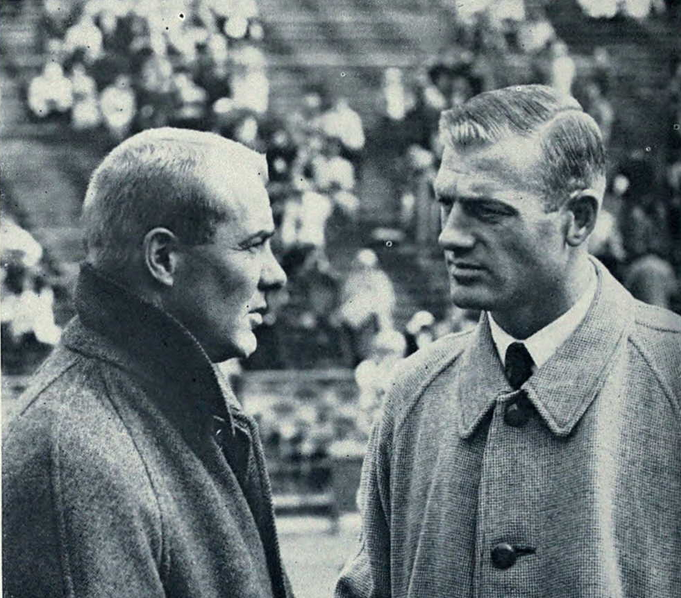
Brothers Bump and Pete Elliott, teammates at Michigan in the 1940s, faced off as opposing coaches in the Illinois game.

- Captain: Jim Conley
- All-Americans: Bob Timberlake (AP, FWAA, FN) and Bill Yearby (NEA CP, FN)
- Academic All-American: Timberlake (first team)
- All-Conference: Bob Timberlake, Bill Yearby, Jim Conley, and Tom Cecchini
- Most Valuable Player: Bob Timberlake
- Meyer Morton Award: Tom Mack
- John Maulbetsch Award: Clayton Wilhite

=== Players advancing to NFL and CFL ===
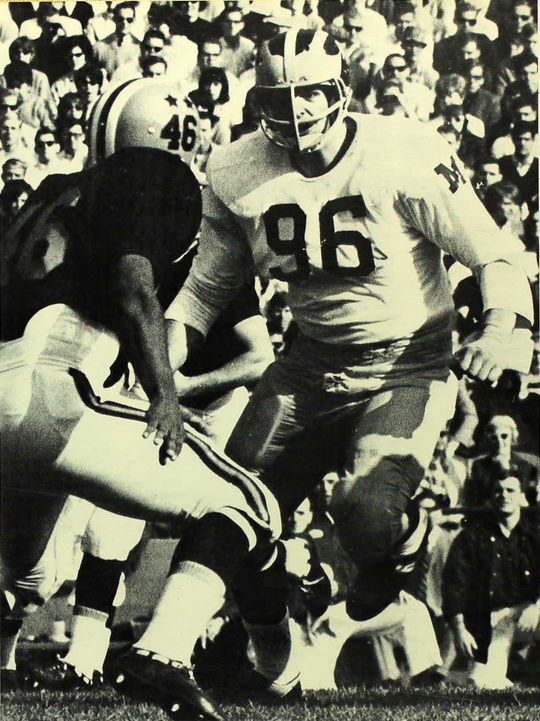
Tom Mack appeared in 11 Pro Bowls.

Michigan's 1964 team featured at least 16 players who went on to play professional football, including:

- Tom Mack, offensive guard (13 years in the NFL, 11 Pro Bowl appearances)
- Rick Volk, defensive back (12 years in the NFL, three Pro Bowl appearances)
- Frank Nunley, linebacker (10 years in the NFL)
- John Rowser, defensive back (10 years in the NFL, led the NFL in interceptions returned for touchdowns in 1971 and 1973)
- Bill Laskey, linebacker (10 years in the AFL/NFL)
- Mike Bass, defensive back (eight years in the NFL)
- Stephen C. Smith, end (eight years in the NFL)
- Wally Gabler, backup quarterback (seven years in the CFL)
- John Henderson, end (eight years in the NFL)
- Jack Clancy, end (three years in the NFL)
- Carl Ward (three years in the NFL)
- Arnie Simkus, defensive lineman (two years in the NFL)
- Bill Keating, lineman (two years in the NFL)
- Mel Anthony, fullback (two years in the CFL)
- Bill Yearby, defensive end (one-year NFL career shortened by knee injury)
- Bob Timberlake, quarterback (one year in the NFL)

Jim Detwiler was a first-round pick in the 1967 NFL/AFL draft, but he underwent knee surgery and never played in the NFL. Linebacker Tom Cecchini went on to become the defensive line coach for the Minnesota Vikings under Bud Grant.

== Coaching staff ==
- Head coach: Bump Elliott
- Assistant coaches: Don Dufek, Dennis Fitzgerald, Henry Fonde, Robert Hollway, Tony Mason, Jack Nelson
- Trainer: Jim Hunt
- Manager: Bob Evans
