= Henry Fonde =

American football player and coach (1924–2009)

- Fonde cropped from the 1945 Michigan Wolverines team photograph

Biographical details
- Born: January 13, 1924; Knoxville, Tennessee, U.S.
- Died: May 3, 2009 (aged 85); Ann Arbor, Michigan, U.S.

Playing career
- 1945–1947: Michigan
- Position: Halfback

Coaching career (HC unless noted)
- 1948: University HS (MI)
- 1949–1958: Ann Arbor Pioneer HS (MI)
- 1959–1968: Michigan (assistant)

Henry Fonde (January 13, 1924 – May 3, 2009) was an American football player and coach. He played for the University of Michigan from 1945 to 1947 under head coach Fritz Crisler. In ten years as the head football coach at Ann Arbor Pioneer High School (1949–1958), he compiled a record of 69–6–4. He subsequently served as an assistant football coach at the University of Michigan under head coach Bump Elliott from 1959–1968.

== Player ==
Fonde was a native of Knoxville, Tennessee. He enrolled at the University of Michigan in 1944 as part of the V-12 Navy College Training Program. He played for Fritz Crisler's Michigan Wolverines football teams from 1945 to 1947. In his first year playing for the Wolverines, Fonde scored Michigan's only touchdown in a 7–3 victory over Ohio State in 1945.

In 1947, Fonde played for Crisler's undefeated 1947 team, considered by some the greatest Michigan football team of all time. After an undefeated, untied regular season, the 1947 Wolverines defeated the University of Southern California 49 to 0 in the 1948 Rose Bowl. The 1948 Rose Bowl was Fonde's final game as a player for the Wolverines, and he capped his collegiate career by throwing the only forward pass he ever threw in a game—resulting in a 45-yard touchdown completion to Gene Derricotte. Michigan coach Bennie Oosterbaan later said of Fonde, who was five feet, seven inches, and 155 pounds, that he was "the best back, pound for pound, I've ever had."

In August 1948, Fonde was drafted by coach Frank Leahy to play in the Chicago College All-Star Game.

== Coaching career ==
Fonde began a coaching career in 1948 as the head football coach at University High School in Ann Arbor, Michigan. His 1948 team won six of eight games.

In February 1949, Fonde was hired as the head football coach at Ann Arbor High School (renamed Ann Arbor Pioneer High School during his tenure as head coach). In his first eight seasons as the school's head coach, he compiled a record of 59–2–2 and developed a reputation as one of the best coaches in the state. He remained head coach at Pioneer through the 1958 season. During his tenure, Fonde's teams had seven undefeated seasons, had a 40-game winning streak, and compiled an overall record of 69–6–4. While coaching at Ann Arbor High, Fonde also received a master's degree in education from the University of Michigan in 1956.

In January 1959, Fonde was hired as the backfield coach for the University of Michigan football team under head coach Bump Elliott. Fonde was an assistant coach at Michigan for 10 years from 1959 to 1968. In 1968, Elliott expanded Fonde's responsibility, giving him "command of the overall defense, while specializing with the defensive backs." During his 10 years at Michigan, he was the position coach for Michigan's backs, including Bennie McRae, Dennis Fitzgerald, Dave Raimey, Mel Anthony, Carl Ward, Bob Timberlake, Jim Detwiler, and Tom Curtis.

Fonde was not retained on the coaching staff when Bo Schembechler took over as head coach. In January 1969, Fonde was given a new position as director of academic counseling and recruiting coordinator. He resigned in June 1970 to accept a position with an Ann Arbor insurance firm.

== Family and later years ==
Fonde was married in April 1948 to Edith Jensen at the First Presbyterian Church in Ann Arbor. Teammate Howard Yerges was his best man.

Fonde later owned and operated the Stretch & Sew Fabric Store in Farmington Hills, Michigan. Fonde died in 2009 at age 85 of complications brought on by Alzheimer's disease.
