= Jim Detwiler =

American football player (born 1945)

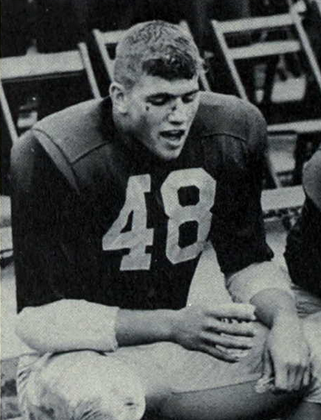
- Detwiler in 1964

No. 48
- Position: Halfback

Personal information
- Born: May 29, 1945 (age 81); Bluffton, Ohio, U.S.
- Listed height: 6 ft 3 in (1.91 m)
- Listed weight: 220 lb (100 kg)

Career information
- High school: DeVilbiss (OH)
- College: Michigan (1964–1966)

Awards and highlights
- First-team All-Big Ten (1966)

James R. Detwiler (born May 29, 1945) is an American former football halfback who was the 20th pick in the first round of the 1967 NFL/AFL draft. Before this he had been an All-Big Ten Conference player for the Michigan Wolverines from 1964 to 1966.

== Early life ==
Detwiler was born in 1945 in Bluffton, Ohio. He was an all-city, all-state and All-American running back as a senior at Toledo's DeVilbiss High School in 1962.

One of the most sought after players in Ohio in 1962, Detwiler "refused an invitation to visit Ohio State, prompting Coach Woody Hayes to harangue him on the telephone one night for more than half an hour about being disloyal to the state of Ohio."

== University of Michigan ==
In 1964, Detwiler was part of Bump Elliott's Big Ten Conference and 1965 Rose Bowl championship team. The Wolverines narrowly missed a National Championship in 1964, in part due to a critical fumble by Detwiler into the end zone in the team's only defeat, a 21-20 loss to Purdue. As he ran toward what appeared to be a touchdown, a Purdue defender hit Detwiler from behind, sending the ball flying into the end zone where it was recovered by Purdue.

Detwiler redeemed himself by scoring the only touchdown in the 1964 Michigan-Ohio State game (Michigan – 10; Ohio State – 0). Both teams were in the Top 10, and Detwiler scored on an 18-yard touchdown pass from Bob Timberlake in the final minute of the first half. Ironically, all of Michigan's scoring in the 1964 game came from Detwiler and Timberlake, both of whom were natives of Ohio. Detwiler later recalled: "My freshman year at Michigan, 21 of the top 30 guys on our team were from Ohio. We had a huge contingent, I think, primarily because Woody was a little bit off the deep end in those years."

In the 1965 Rose Bowl, Michigan beat the Oregon State Beavers 34-7, and Detwiler had a 30-yard reception from Timberlake on a key scoring drive in the third quarter.

In the 1965 season, a knee injury limited Detwiler to three games. He had surgery to repair a torn anterior cruciate ligament.

In 1966, he returned from his injury, but he never fully recovered as his knee swelled after every game. He had the best game of his career against Ohio State in 1966, gaining 140 yards, and scoring a touchdown, on 20 carries—all in the first half. The Wolverines won, 17-3, and Detwiler later recalled: "We knew after the first two series that we were the better team. They couldn't stop us, and they couldn't do much against us. But I'll tell you what: That game got me a pro contract." As for why he did not play in the second half, Detwiler recalled: "I ran the ball more times in the first half than I had ever run it before, but I ran out of gas. The coach very kindly told the media that I had the flu. I actually was rubber-legged and couldn't play much after that."

For his career at Michigan, Detwiler had 788 rushing yards and seven touchdowns.

Detwiler was named to the first-team All Big Ten team, and he rushed for over 100 yards in the Blue–Gray Football Classic in 1966, earning himself the game's most valuable back award.

== Professional football ==
The Baltimore Colts picked Detwiler in the first round of the 1967 NFL/AFL draft as the 20th pick overall. This was the first year that the 20th overall selection in the National Football League Draft occurred in the first round because the American Football League (AFL) and NFL drafted together for the first time. Detwiler was part of a class of six NFL draftees from Michigan that year (Mike Bass, Frank Nunley, John Rowser, Rick Volk, and Carl Ward). Detwiler signed with the Colts in May 1967. He received a $50,000 signing bonus and played in a couple preseason games in 1967, but his knee was still hurting. He had more surgery on the knee and missed the entire 1967 season. He failed to make the team in 1968, and his professional football career was over. He is the most recent 1st round NFL Draft choice to have never played a game in the NFL, not counting the 1984 Supplemental Draft.

== Dental career and later years ==
Detwiler enrolled in dental school while trying to rehabilitate his knee. He used his $50,000 signing bonus to put himself through dental school.

In 1971, Detwiler returned to Toledo and set up a dental practice near Perrysburg, Ohio.
