= Rick Volk =

American football player (born 1945)

No. 21, 23
- Position: Safety

Personal information
- Born: March 15, 1945 (age 81); Toledo, Ohio, U.S.
- Listed height: 6 ft 3 in (1.91 m)
- Listed weight: 195 lb (88 kg)

Career information
- High school: Wauseon (Wauseon, Ohio)
- College: Michigan
- NFL draft: 1967: 2nd round, 45th overall pick

Career history
- Baltimore Colts (1967–1975); New York Giants (1976); Miami Dolphins (1977–1978)

Awards and highlights
- Super Bowl champion (V); NFL champion (1968); 3× All-Pro (1968, 1970, 1971); 3× Pro Bowl (1967, 1969, 1971); First-team All-American (1966); 2× First-team All-Big Ten (1965, 1966); Second-team All-Big Ten (1964)

Career NFL statistics
- Interceptions: 38
- Interception yards: 574
- Games started: 136
- Games played: 150
- Stats at Pro Football Reference

Richard Robert Volk (born March 15, 1945) is an American former professional football player who was a safety in the National Football League (NFL) for the Baltimore Colts, New York Giants, and Miami Dolphins. He retired with 38 career interceptions and 13 fumble recoveries, and totaled 574 yards on interception returns and 548 yards on punt returns.

Volk played college football for the Michigan Wolverines from 1964 to 1966 and was a member of the 1964 team that won the Big Ten Conference championship and defeated Oregon State in the 1965 Rose Bowl. He played as a defensive back for Michigan's defensive unit and as a halfback and quarterback for the offensive unit. Volk was also selected by the Sporting News as a first-team All-American in 1967. In 1989, he was inducted into the University of Michigan Athletic Hall of Honor; Volk and Ron Johnson were the first two football players from the 1960s to be so honored.

Volk went on to a successful 12-year career as a safety in the National Football League. He played nine years with the Baltimore Colts from 1967 to 1975. He was a member of the Colts' teams that lost Super Bowl III to the New York Jets and won Super Bowl V against the Dallas Cowboys. Volk was selected as an NFL All-Pro four times (1968–1971) and played in three Pro Bowls (1967, 1969, 1971). After being released by the Colts in April 1976, Volk concluded his playing career with the New York Giants in 1976 and the Miami Dolphins from 1977 to 1978. In 1977, Volk was selected by Baltimore fans as a starter for the Colts' 25th anniversary team.

== Early life ==
Volk was born in Toledo, Ohio, in 1945. He attended Wauseon High School in Wauseon, Ohio, where he was a three-sports star. He was an all-league basketball and baseball player and also played quarterback on the football team.

== University of Michigan ==
Volk enrolled at the University of Michigan in 1963. His decision to attend Michigan rather than Ohio State was influenced by family ties, including Bob Chappuis, who was Volk's uncle and finished second in the Heisman Trophy voting while playing for the undefeated 1947 Wolverines. Volk noted:

"I had all these stories growing up. He [Bob Chappuis] was my hero, so I always wanted to go to Michigan. ... And I didn't like Woody [Hayes] anyway. It was just my Grandpa telling me because he didn't like Woody, and he hoped Woody would choke on his Thanksgiving turkey. ... Because of Uncle Bob going to Michigan, that's where I wanted to go. You know, I loved the helmets, loved the uniforms. I said 'Hey, if I could just sit on the bench, that's all I care about.'"

At Michigan, Volk was a three-year starter from 1964 to 1966. Prior to the start of the 1964 season, he was given jersey no. 49, the same number worn by his uncle when he played for Michigan. During the 1964 season, Volk played at the halfback position on both offense and defense and also served as a backup at quarterback to Bob Timberlake. In his first game for the Wolverines, he intercepted a pass in the end zone against Air Force. In his second game, he helped the Michigan defense hold scoreless a high-scoring Navy team led by Hall of Fame quarterback Roger Staubach. He also threw a 33-yard touchdown pass against Northwestern in October 1964. In a close victory over Minnesota, after the Golden Gophers had cut Michigan's lead to five points and advanced the ball to Michigan's 7-yard line, Volk "smashed through to down the Gopher ball carrier, and save the game on fourth down." Volk was described by sports writer Joe Hendrickson as "instinctive — usually in the right place to mess things up for the opposition." Volk helped the 1964 Michigan team win the Big Ten Conference championship and defeat Oregon State in the 1965 Rose Bowl by a score of 34–7.

As a junior in 1965, Volk started all 10 games for Michigan at cornerback and also started four games on offense as the left halfback. He was selected by both the Associated Press and the United Press International as a first-team All-Big Ten defensive back at the end of the 1965 season.

As a senior in 1966, Volk started all 10 games at safety and also started 2 games at fullback, and even started one game as quarterback. At the conclusion of the 1966 season, he was selected as a first-team All-American by the Sporting News. At the conclusion of his college football career at Michigan, the Newspaper Editors Association distributed a feature story on Volk, describing him as follows:

"Rick Volk is a safety man who conjures up an image of homemade apple pie and pancakes smothered in maple syrup, Saturday night movies and picnics in a wooded grove. He is clear-eyed and smooth-cheeked, with a short tilted nose and a smile that shows white. He couldn't be more pure mid-Americana if he were framed by a billboard."

Volk was invited to play on the College All-Star team following his senior year. At the camp for the All-Star team, he was rated by the scouts as "the best all-around athlete among the high-priced talent preparing for pro debuts."

In 1989, Volk was inducted into the University of Michigan Athletic Hall of Honor. He joined his uncle, Bob Chappuis, who was inducted into the Hall of Honor five years earlier in 1984. Volk and Ron Johnson, both inducted in 1989, were the first two football players from the 1960s to be inducted into the Hall of Honor.

== Professional football ==
=== Baltimore Colts ===
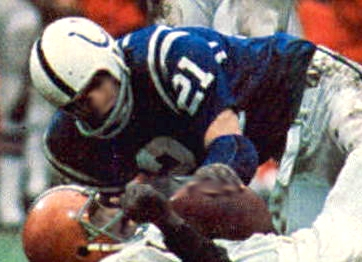
Rick Volk during his time with the Baltimore Colts.

Volk played as a free safety for 12 seasons in the NFL. He was selected four times as an NFL All-Pro (1968–1971) and played three times in the Pro Bowl (1967, 1969, 1971). Volk also played in the Super Bowl twice for the Baltimore Colts as a member of the Super Bowl III team and the Super Bowl V winning team.

He made a name for himself as a rookie in 1967 by recovering an onside kick to help the Colts defeat the Packers. He also set a Colts team record for the longest interception runback with a 94-yard touchdown return against Chicago in November 1967. Volk's interception of the pass intended for Brian Piccolo was his third interception in four games. For his performance against the Bears, he was named the NFL's Defensive Player of the Week. At the end of his rookie season, Volk was chosen to play in his first Pro Bowl game.

==== NFL Champion, Super Bowl III ====
In his second season with the team, Volk intercepted 6 passes and totalled 154 yards on interception returns. He also returned 25 punts for 198 yards (6th best in the NFL) in 1968. He was selected as a first-team NFL All-Pro player at the end of the 1968 NFL season by the Pro Football Writers, the Newspaper Enterprise Association, and the United Press International.

The Colts won the NFL championship in 1968 and played Joe Namath's AFL champion New York Jets in Super Bowl III. Volk was knocked unconscious during Super Bowl III when he collided helmet-to-helmet with Jets fullback Matt Snell. Volk was rushed to the hospital after he went into convulsions after a second concussion on a 4th quarter onside kick attempt by the Colts. He was put in the intensive care ward for two days and moved to a regular room on the Tuesday after the game.

He recovered and returned to the Colts in 1969, playing all 14 games and earning selection to Pro Bowl. Volk recorded four interceptions and recovered two fumbles, but the Colts slipped to 8-5-1 and missed the playoffs. It was the franchise's final season before the NFL-AFL merger became official, as Baltimore would join Cleveland, Pittsburgh and all 10 surviving teams of the former AFL in the American Football Conference.

==== Super Bowl V Champion ====
In 1970, Volk helped lead the Colts to another Super Bowl appearance, but were now representing the AFC following the merger of the two leagues (NFL and AFL) that year. This time, the Colts defeated the Dallas Cowboys in Super Bowl V. Volk was responsible for covering Pro Football Hall of Famers Bob Hayes and Mike Ditka in the Super Bowl, and he played a key role in the Colts' victory. In the fourth quarter, the Colts trailed the Cowboys 13–6. Volk intercepted a pass by Cowboys quarterback Craig Morton at the Dallas 33-yard line and returned it 30 yards to the 3-yard line to set up the tying touchdown. Baltimore quarterback Earl Morrall later referred to Volk's interception as the play of the game.

Interviewed in 2009, Volk cited Super Bowl V as his fondest memory of playing in Baltimore. He recalled team owner Carroll Rosenbloom flying the whole team, families included, to the Bahamas the day after the game: "The next day we all got on the plane and flew over to the Bahamas. He took the whole family – my wife and one kid, at the time. I remember we were on the beach, Tom Mitchell and I, and we got the paper to make sure it was really true - that we did win. Because this was like a dream come true on the sand beaches in the Bahamas."

==== Later Colts Years ====
Volk had his best season in 1971 when he was picked as a first-team NFL All-Pro by the Associated Press, Pro Football Writers, and the Newspaper Ent. Association. He remained with Colts for nine years and was one of the last players from the Super Bowl V champions to remain with the team. In 1974, one Maryland sports writer noted that Volk remained a solid performer: "Although the Colts suffered through an overall dismal campaign in 1973, Volk remained one of the few solid performers in an otherwise lackluster season." In June 1975, Volk prepared for his ninth season with the Colts as one columnist wrote:

"Rick Volk has seen both ends of the rainbow in his tenure with the Baltimore Colts. The personable veteran defensive back has known the sweet taste of success, attested by the Super Bowl ring he often wears, and also has survived the agony of defeat — especially after people like Don Shula, John Unitas, Bubba Smith and Tom Matte were no longer wanted or appreciated in the Monumental City."

Volk was placed on waivers by the Colts in April 1976; he was picked up by the Denver Broncos one week later. With Volk's departure, punter David Lee was the sole remaining player on the Baltimore roster from the 1970 Super Bowl team.

In October 1977, Volk was selected as a starter on the Colts' 25th anniversary team. The team was selected by the fans in Baltimore, and the only players at any position to receive more votes than Volk were David Lee, Johnny Unitas, Raymond Berry, Alan Ameche, Gino Marchetti, John Mackey, Mike Curtis, Art Donovan, Alex Sandusky, Jim Parker and Bobby Boyd.

=== New York Giants ===
Volk was cut by the Broncos in August 1976 and signed by the Miami Dolphins two weeks later. He did not play for the Dolphins in 1976 and was signed mid-season by the New York Giants. Volk played in 8 games for the Giants in 1976 and tallied 2 interceptions and a fumble recovery. Volk was cut by the Giants in early September 1977, shortly before the start of the regular season. Volk recalled the disappointment at being cut by the Giants at age 32: "I felt I should have been in New York, but they went with younger people. I was very disappointed, especially to get cut at the end of training camp. I'd done all the hard training and was ready for the season – the fun time." He returned to his home in Baltimore and worked during the fall as a manufacturer's representative.

=== Miami Dolphins ===
Volk signed with the Miami Dolphins for the final month of the 1977 NFL season. He played in three games for the 1977 Miami Dolphins and had one interception (off Buffalo Bills quarterback Joe Ferguson). Miami head coach Don Shula, who had worked with Volk in Baltimore, said, "We got him in the last four games, and he showed us some great hitting. He also didn't seem to have lost any speed."

During the 1978 NFL season, Volk appeared in all 16 games for the Dolphins, 13 of them as a starter. Volk started the season strong, intercepting a pass in the season opener against the New York Jets. In the second game of the season, the Dolphins played the Colts in Baltimore. Volk intercepted two passes against Baltimore quarterback Bill Troup and helped the Dolphins to a 42–0 win. After the game, Volk told reporters, "I wanted to have a good game in Baltimore, and I couldn't have asked for anything better than the way it turned out." While Volk began the 1978 season as a starter, he was replaced by Charlie Babb for the final four games. After the Dolphins lost the AFC wildcard game to the Oilers, Volk announced his retirement. Volk told reporters he had wanted to end his career with a championship team and added, "When the game's over, you can't worry about it. For most of the guys, there'll be another season. For me, this is it."

== Later life ==
Volk began working as a manufacturer's representative while still playing football, and continued in that business after retiring from the game. Interviewed in 2009, Volk was selling industrial equipment to steel mills.

== See also ==
- University of Michigan Athletic Hall of Honor
