= Arnie Simkus =

American football player (born 1943)

No. 76, 69
- Positions: Defensive end, Defensive tackle

Personal information
- Born: March 25, 1943 (age 83); Schlawa, Germany
- Listed height: 6 ft 4 in (1.93 m)
- Listed weight: 240 lb (109 kg)

Career information
- High school: Cass Technical (Detroit, Michigan, U.S.)
- College: Michigan
- NFL draft: 1965: 6th round, 72nd overall pick

Career history
- 1962, 1964: Michigan
- 1965: New York Jets
- 1967: Minnesota Vikings
- Stats at Pro Football Reference

Arnold J. Simkus (born March 25, 1943) is a former American football player. Simkus was born in Schlawa, Germany (now part of Poland) and immigrated to the United States as a boy. He graduated from Cass Tech High School in Detroit, Michigan before enrolling at the University of Michigan. He was a member of the 1964 Michigan Wolverines football team that won the Big Ten Conference championship and defeated Oregon State in the 1965 Rose Bowl. On November 28, 1964, Simkus was drafted by the Cleveland Browns in the sixth round (72nd overall pick) of the 1965 NFL draft. In April 1965, Simkus signed a contract to play professional football for the American Football League's New York Jets. Simkus played in only one game for the Jets in the 1965 season and later signed with the Minnesota Vikings. He played in 11 games for the Vikings during the 1967 NFL season. Simkus later formed All-American Lifeguard, a personal training service based in Warren, Michigan.
