= Bill Keating (American football) =

American football player (1944–2015)

No. 61, 72
- Positions: Defensive tackle, Guard

Personal information
- Born: November 22, 1944; Chicago, Illinois
- Died: January 1, 2015 (aged 70); Denver, Colorado
- Listed height: 6 ft 2 in (1.88 m)
- Listed weight: 242 lb (110 kg)

Career information
- High school: St. Patrick High School
- College: Michigan

Career history
- Denver Broncos (1966–1967); Miami Dolphins (1967)
- Stats at Pro Football Reference

William Lawrence Keating (November 22, 1944 – January 1, 2015) was an American professional football player in the American Football League (AFL). He played college football for the University of Michigan and professionally for the Denver Broncos and Miami Dolphins during the 1960s. After his playing career, he became a trial lawyer.

== University of Michigan ==
Keating played college football as a guard for the University of Michigan from 1963 to 1965. He helped lead the 1964 Michigan Wolverines football team to the Big Ten Championship and a victory in the 1965 Rose Bowl.

== Professional football ==
Keating played two seasons of professional football as a defensive tackle and guard for the Denver Broncos (1966–1967) and Miami Dolphins (1967), appearing in 22 AFL or NFL games. He signed with the Broncos as a free agent in June 1966. He was signed by the Dolphins after he was put on waivers by the Broncos in October 1967. The Dolphins placed him on waivers at the end of November 1967.

Keating's older brother Tom Keating also played college football for the University of Michigan and several years of professional football.

== Legal career ==
After retiring from football, Keating attended the University of Denver College of Law, receiving his J.D. degree in 1971. He was a founding partner of the Colorado law firm of Fogel, Keating, Wagner, Polidori, Shaffner (known in 2025 as Keating Wagner Polidori Free). He was a trial lawyer specializing in plaintiffs' personal injury and wrongful death litigation. He was a fellow in the International Academy of Trial Lawyers and the American Academy of Trial Lawyers. He was president of the Colorado Trial Lawyers Association from 1991 to 1992. He was so respected by the Colorado Bar that the University of Denver College of Law selects an annual winner of the William L. Keating Outstanding Alumni Award at its DU Law Stars dinner.
