= Steve Smith (offensive lineman) =

American football player (born 1944)

No. 88, 74, 78
- Position: Defensive end/Tackle

Personal information
- Born: May 29, 1944 (age 82); St. Louis, Missouri, U.S.
- Listed height: 6 ft 5 in (1.96 m)
- Listed weight: 250 lb (113 kg)

Career information
- High school: Park Ridge (IL) Maine East
- College: Michigan
- NFL draft: 1966: 5th round, 71st overall pick
- AFL draft: 1966: 16th round, 140th overall pick

Career history
- Pittsburgh Steelers (1966); Minnesota Vikings (1968–1970); Philadelphia Eagles (1971–1974)

Awards and highlights
- NFL champion (1969)

Career NFL statistics
- Games played: 100
- Games started: 54
- Fumble recoveries: 2
- Stats at Pro Football Reference

Stephen Conant Smith (born May 29, 1944) is an American former professional football player in the National Football League (NFL). Smith was born in St. Louis, Missouri, and attended Maine East High School in suburban Chicago. He played college football at the end position for the Michigan Wolverines from 1963 to 1965. He was selected by the San Francisco 49ers in the fifth round (71st overall pick) of the 1966 NFL draft. He played eight seasons in the NFL at the offensive tackle and defensive end positions for the Pittsburgh Steelers (1966), Minnesota Vikings (1968–70), and Philadelphia Eagles (1971–74). He was traded along with second- and sixth-round selections in 1971 (50th and 154th overall–Hank Allison and Mississippi defensive back Wyck Neely respectively) and a 1972 third-round pick (76th overall–Bobby Majors) from the Vikings to the Eagles for Norm Snead on January 28, 1971.
