= Bill Laskey (American football) =

American football player (1943–2022)

No. 52, 42, 51, 45
- Position: Linebacker

Personal information
- Born: February 10, 1943; Ann Arbor, Michigan, U.S.
- Died: May 6, 2022 (aged 79); Leland, Michigan, U.S.
- Listed height: 6 ft 3 in (1.91 m)
- Listed weight: 235 lb (107 kg)

Career information
- High school: Milan (Milan, Michigan)
- College: Michigan
- NFL draft: 1964: undrafted

Career history
- Buffalo Bills (1965); Oakland Raiders (1966–1970); Baltimore Colts (1971–1972); Denver Broncos (1973–1974)

Awards and highlights
- 2× AFL champion (1965, 1967); 1965 Pro Bowl

Career AFL/NFL statistics
- Games played: 119
- Interceptions: 7
- Fumble recoveries: 8
- Stats at Pro Football Reference

William Grant Laskey (February 10, 1943 – May 6, 2022) was an American professional football player who was a linebacker in the American Football League (AFL) and National Football League (NFL) from 1965 to 1974. He played college football for the Michigan Wolverines.

== Early life ==
Laskey was born in Ann Arbor, Michigan, on February 10, 1943. He attended Milan High School in Milan, Michigan, where he played football, basketball, and track and field. He broke the school's record in hurdling and registered a long jump of more than 22 feet (6.7 m). After graduating in 1961, he studied at the University of Michigan and played college football for the Michigan Wolverines from 1962 to 1964. He played as an offensive end, and caught nine passes for 118 yards and one touchdown during the 1963 and 1964 seasons.

== Professional career ==
Laskey signed with the Buffalo Bills in 1965, and changed positions to linebacker. He played in 14 games (1 start) during his rookie season and was selected to the Pro Bowl that same year, with the Bills winning the 1965 AFL Championship Game. He joined the Oakland Raiders the following year and finished sixth in the league in fumbles recovered (3) during the 1967 season. He won his second AFL championship that year, before playing in Super Bowl II, in which the Raiders lost 33–14 to the Green Bay Packers. Laskey ended up playing 53 games (22 starts) in five seasons with the franchise, tallying 4 interceptions for 66 yards and recovering 5 fumbles.

Laskey went on to play for the Baltimore Colts from 1971 to 1972, before finishing his NFL career with the Denver Broncos in 1973–1974. He was selected by the Newspaper Enterprise Association (NEA) as a second-team All-AFL player in 1967. Over the course of a ten-year NFL career, Laskey appeared in 119 games, 45 as a starter, and had seven interceptions and eight fumble recoveries.

== Personal life ==
Laskey was married to Dona until his death. Bill had three children with his first wife who passed at an early age from breast cancer: Lance, Beau, and Margaux.

Laskey died on May 6, 2022, in Leland, Michigan. He was 79, and suffered from an unspecified long illness prior to his death.
