= Mel Anthony =

American football player (born 1943)

No. 37
- Position: Fullback

Personal information
- Born: January 30, 1943 (age 83); Cincinnati, Ohio, U.S.

Career information
- High school: Roger Bacon (St. Bernard, Ohio)
- College: Michigan (1962–1964)

Career history
- 1965: Hamilton Tiger-Cats
- 1966: Montreal Beavers
- 1967: Ypsilanti Vikings

Awards and highlights
- Grey Cup champion (1965); Rose Bowl MVP (1965)

Mel Anthony (born January 30, 1943) is an American former football running back. He played football for the University of Michigan from 1962 to 1964 and was named the Most Valuable Player of the 1965 Rose Bowl after setting a Rose Bowl record with an 84-yard touchdown run. He played in the Canadian Football League (CFL) in 1965 for the Hamilton Tiger-Cats, in 1966 for the Montreal Beavers of the Continental Football League (COFL), and in the Midwest Football League in 1967 for the Ypsilanti Vikings.

== Early life ==
Anthony attended Roger Bacon High School in Cincinnati, Ohio. He played on offense at the fullback position and on defense as a linebacker for Roger Bacon's football team. In December 1960, he was selected by the UPI as a first-team All-Ohio defensive player at linebacker.

== University of Michigan ==
In 1961, Anthony enrolled at the University of Michigan. He played at the fullback position for Bump Elliott's Michigan Wolverines football team from 1962 to 1964. He was Michigan's lead rusher in 1963 and 1964. In two games against Iowa in 1963 and 1964, Anthony scored six touchdowns (three each in 1963 and 1964) and rushed for 204 yards (83 in 1963 and 121 yards in 1964). He also rushed for 84 yards on 15 carries (5.6 yards per carry) against the 1963 Ohio State Buckeyes football team. As a senior, Anthony was one of the leaders of the 1964 Michigan Wolverines football team that won the Big Ten Conference championship and defeated Oregon State in the 1965 Rose Bowl. The 1965 Rose Bowl was Anthony's final game for Michigan, and Anthony was named the game's Most Valuable Player after he rushed for a career-high 123 yards, scored three touchdowns, and averaged 9.5 yards per carry. He also set a Rose Bowl Game record with an 84-yard touchdown run, surpassing the prior record set by Iowa's Bob Jeter in the 1959 Rose Bowl. Following the game, the Long Beach Press Telegram wrote:

"Anthony, senior fullback who has been playing in the shadow of Michigan's touted Bob Timberlake, barreled his way into the record books with three touchdowns. His 84-yard dash (it actually was 84 1/2, the play starting on the 15 1/2 yard line) was the longest run in Rose Bowl history . . . while his 18 points tied the Bowl scoring record established 40 years ago by Elmer Layden ... Anthony also recovered the punt that was blocked by tackle Bob Mielke in the third period, grabbing It on the Oregon State 15 — and later going in for the touchdown from a yard out. His other score came on a seven yard run. Although Elliott said he 'probably could name 22 players who could have been voted player of the game,' it was only natural that Anthony received the honor."

== Professional football ==
Anthony was selected by the Cleveland Browns in the 16th round (223rd overall selection) of the 1965 NFL draft. He signed with the Browns in early July 1965, but he was cut in late August, shortly before the start of the regular season. After being cut by the Browns, Anthony opted instead to play in the Canadian Football League. He was initially signed by the Edmonton Eskimos, but he was also cut by the Eskimos. He finally signed with the Hamilton Tiger-Cats and helped lead the team to the 1965 Grey Cup championship. Anthony was cut by the Tiger-Cats in August 1966 and signed with the Montreal Beavers. He played for the Ypsilanti Vikings of the Midwest Football League in 1967.
