= Bob Timberlake (American football) =

American football player (born 1943)

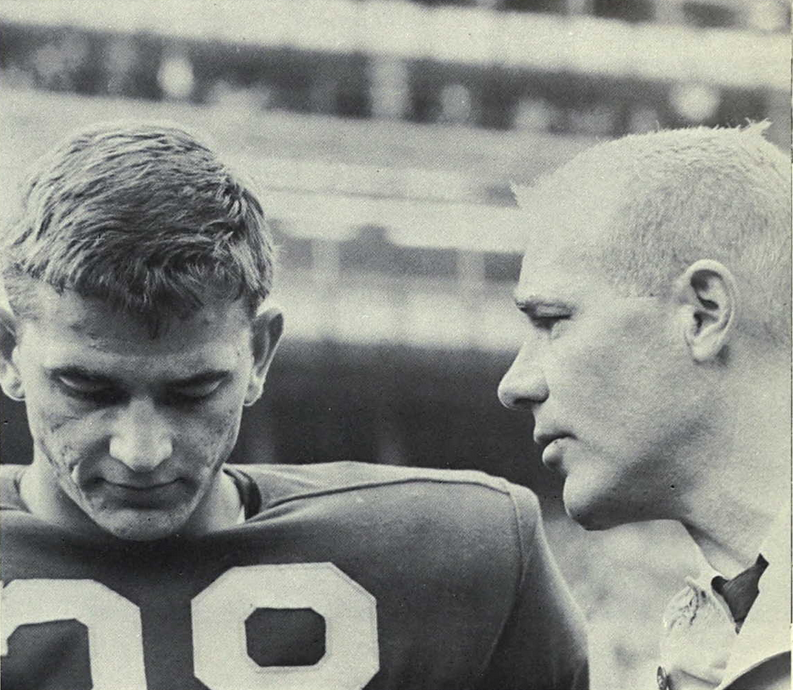
- Timberlake (left) with Bump Elliott, 1964

No. 18
- Position: Placekicker

Personal information
- Born: October 18, 1943 (age 83); Middletown, Ohio, U.S.
- Listed height: 6 ft 4 in (1.93 m)
- Listed weight: 220 lb (100 kg)

Career information
- High school: Franklin (OH)
- College: Michigan (1961-1964)
- NFL draft: 1965: 3rd round, 33rd overall pick
- AFL draft: 1965: 13th round, 104th overall pick

Career history
- New York Giants (1965); Scranton Miners (1966)

Awards and highlights
- Chic Harley Award (1964); First-team All-American (1964); Chicago Tribune Silver Football (1964); First-team All-Big Ten (1964)

Career NFL statistics
- Field goals: 1/15
- Field goal %: 6.7
- Extra points: 21/22
- Stats at Pro Football Reference

Robert W. Timberlake (born October 18, 1943) is an American former professional football player who was a placekicker for the New York Giants of the National Football League (NFL) in 1965. He played college football for the Michigan Wolverines from 1962 to 1964.

Timberlake was the starting quarterback for Michigan who led the Wolverines to the 1964 Big Ten Conference championship and a 34–7 victory over Oregon State Beavers in the 1965 Rose Bowl. Timberlake was selected as a first-team All-American in 1964, received the Chicago Tribune Silver Football trophy as the Most Valuable Player in the Big Ten, and finished fourth in the 1964 Heisman Trophy voting. Over his three years at Michigan, Timberlake rushed for 315 yards and passed for 1,507 yards. He was responsible for 19 touchdowns, eleven rushing and eight passing. He also served as the team's punter and placekicker with six field goals, 36 extra points, and a total of 121 points scored.

After a brief career in professional football, Timberlake became an ordained Presbyterian minister. Even during his football career, Timberlake was outspoken about his Christian faith. He has also been active in Habitat for Humanity. Since 2003, he has been on the faculty of Marquette University where he teaches courses in community service and affordable housing.

== College football ==
Timberlake was born in Middletown, Ohio, but he was raised in Franklin, Ohio and played football for the Franklin Wildcats. He was originally recruited as a halfback and played more than any other Michigan player at halfback in 1962. However, he was later switched to the quarterback position and had his greatest success there.

=== 1964 regular season ===
In 1964, Timberlake led the Wolverines football team to their first Big Ten Conference championship since 1950, breaking the longest championship drought in school history. Playing quarterback, Timberlake's total offense of 1,381 yards (807 passing and 574 rushing) was the second highest in Michigan history at that time. The 1964 Wolverines outscored their opponents 235–83, finished the regular season 8–1, and narrowly missed an undefeated season with a 21–20 loss to a Purdue Boilermakers team led by sophomore Bob Griese. By virtue of turnovers, Purdue led 21–14 with five minutes remaining. Timberlake ran an option play to the left side and went 54 yards for a touchdown. Rather than kick the extra point for the tie, Timberlake carried again on the option play to the right, but was tackled one foot short of the goal line, and two points short of an undefeated season. When Michigan and Ohio State met in Columbus, Ohio on November 21, 1964, both teams were in the Top 10 in the national rankings. Michigan had not beaten Ohio State since 1959. Michigan won 10–0, as Ohio native Timberlake was responsible for all ten points, including a 17-yard touchdown pass to Jim Detwiler and a fourth-quarter, 27-yard field goal to clinch the game.

=== 1965 Rose Bowl ===
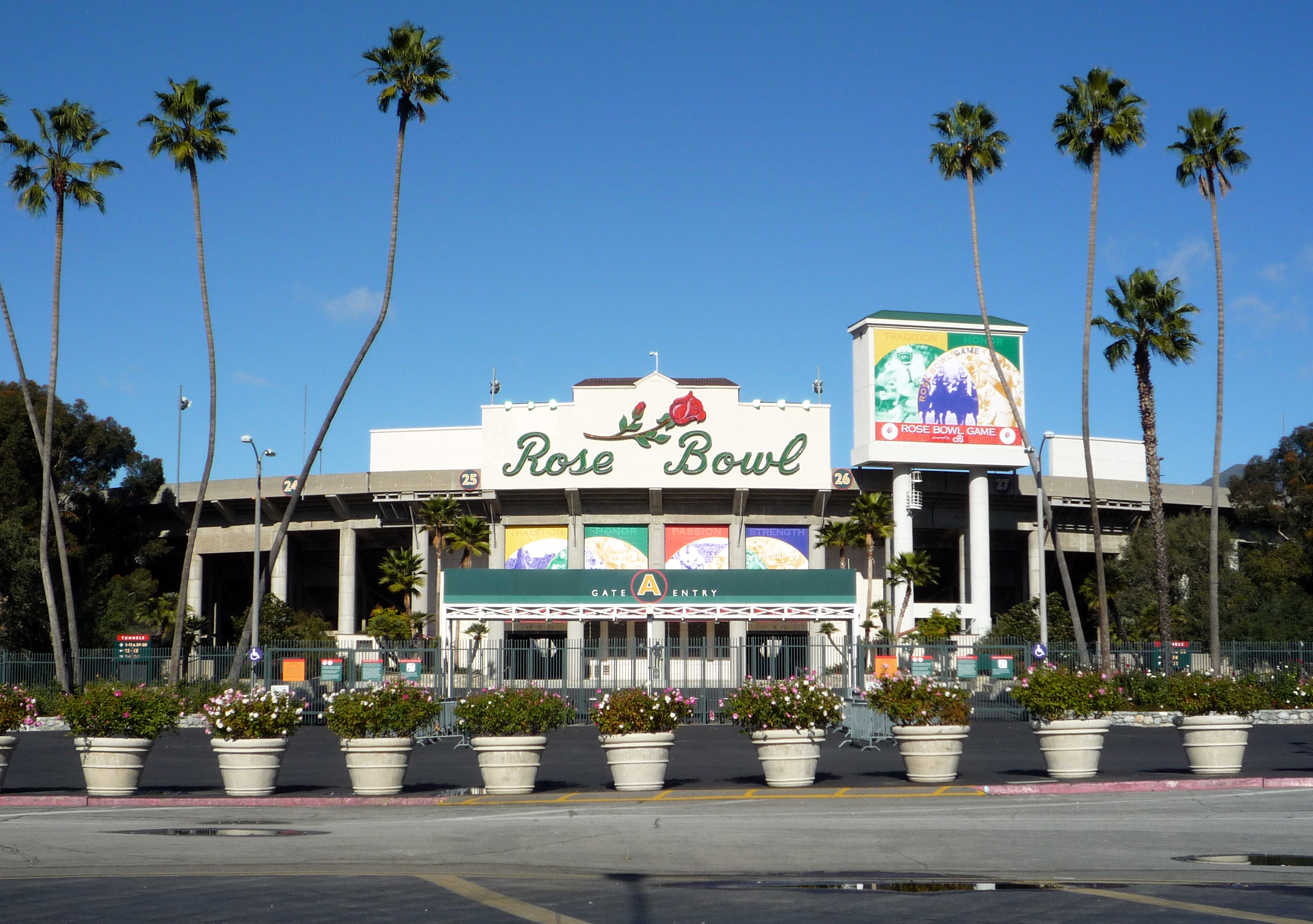
Timberlake led the team in the 1965 Rose Bowl.

The Wolverines (ranked No. 4) advanced to the Rose Bowl where they defeated Tommy Prothro's Oregon State Beavers, 34–7, on New Year's Day. Prior to the Rose Bowl, much of the attention was focused on Michigan's veteran quarterback. The Pasadena Star-News wrote that Timberlake was "the key" to Michigan's attack: "He does everything—run, pass, kick field goals, soup up the team…Timberlake has had that strength. The Wolverines listen to him and they believe in him. At 6–4 and weighing 215 pounds, Timberlake is a Lincoln to look up to." Mel Anthony scored three touchdowns for Michigan, and Timberlake and the Wolverines gained 415 yards in the game. Timberlake was 7-for-10 passing for 77 yards, and added 57 yards rushing, including a 24-yard touchdown run in the fourth quarter.

=== Post-season honors ===
At the end of the 1964 season, Timberlake was awarded the Chicago Tribune Silver Football as the Most Valuable Player in the Big Ten Conference. He placed fourth in the Heisman Trophy voting (losing to Notre Dame's John Huarte), and was also named to multiple All-American teams. After attending an All-American dinner at New York's Waldorf Astoria Hotel, Timberlake reported, "There is a great deal of loneliness in being an All-America. . . . I get sick of it. They all want to shake your hand, but they don't really know you. All they do is stick out the glad hand. I don't mind talking to anyone who is interested in ideas, but nothing makes me sicker than having my name dropped by people who don't know anything about me except that I'm an All-America." He joked that he might write an autobiography called, "The Loneliness of an All-America." He was also an A-minus student majoring in sociology, was named a scholar-athlete by National Football Association, and was placed on the Big Ten All-Academic team two consecutive seasons.

== Religion in Timberlake's life ==
Timberlake was outspoken during his time in the limelight about the importance of his Christian faith. While attending the University of Michigan in Ann Arbor, he said that at one point he felt his "whole life was really off the track", but "the guidance of Dr. Ernest T. Campbell, a great speaker" at the First Presbyterian Church of Ann Arbor helped him to develop his faith. Timberlake taught Sunday school and said he intended to become a Presbyterian minister. At a speech in Mansfield, Ohio, shortly after winning the Rose Bowl in January 1965, Timberlake said, "I couldn't have played football if it hadn't been for Jesus Christ." He continued, "God changed my life. He promises the abundant life, which he has given me, and eternal life, which if I die I'm sure I will have. There's peace associated with being a Christian."

Timberlake also spoke openly of his personal conversion as he walked in a parking lot while on a night watchman's job at a Chevrolet plant in Warren, Michigan. Timberlake defined a Christian as "one who has Christ as his personal savior," and not just a person who was brought up in a Christian home or goes to church.

When he signed a professional football contract with the New York Giants, Timberlake stated that he intended to take ministerial training at Princeton Theological Seminary during the off-season. He noted, "I don't really want to play professional football, because there is no privacy and no time to be alone when you're a famous athlete." He emphasized that, if he were ever forced to choose between professional football or studying for the ministry, he would give up football: "I see no reason why I can't do both, but if I have to give up pro ball, I'll certainly do it." Timberlake said the thing he would always remember about playing football was the 20 minutes before kickoff. He recalled that those 20 minutes were "horrible." "You want to go home. You want to quit football. It is times like these when something happens to me. I can't explain it. I put my face in my hands and ask God to come into my heart and give me courage. He gives me peace."

When a boy asked Timberlake for his autograph at the Giants' rookie camp in 1965, Timberlake signed his name but also wrote citations to two Bible verses: John 3:16 and 1 Peter 1:5–9. The boy asked, "What's that?" Timberlake explained they were Bible verses, and he told reporters he started doing it about six months earlier, hoping the kids would look up the verses. In 1965, such public religious expressions were not common among athletes, and columnists made note of the fact that Timberlake "packs a Bible in his suitcase and keeps one in his locker."

While playing for the Giants in October 1965, he told an interviewer: "I'm playing football to convey Christianity either indirectly or directly and to give me access to you people. The eye of American is upon the sports' field, so I can reach more people playing football. I guess you can say my goal is to spread a Christian message." At that time, he was attending Princeton Theological Seminary once a week and planned to attend full-time after the football season. Asked if the violent nature of football was inconsistent with his Christian beliefs, Timberlake noted that "you don't need to hurt anyone to get by" in football and that the game involved skill, timing and execution more than violence. He then joked, "There's nothing really wrong with good, clean violence."

== Professional football ==
The New York Giants drafted Timberlake in the third round of the 1965 NFL draft. He signed a two-year contract with the Giants for an estimated $85,000 ($12,500 per year base plus $60,000 in bonuses and fringe benefits). Timberlake turned down offers from the Buffalo Bills in the American Football League (AFL) and the Winnipeg Blue Bombers in the Canadian Football League (CFL) because he had an opportunity to compete for a starting job with the Giants. Future Pro Football Hall of Famer Y. A. Tittle’s tenure with the Giants was over, and Timberlake was expected to compete in a new system that would emphasize rushing quarterbacks.

Timberlake did not get the quarterback spot with the Giants and was assigned as kickoff specialist; he was also used as a kicker on long field goals for the 1965 NFL season. In a nationally televised game on October 3, 1965, at Pittsburgh, Timberlake hit a 43-yard field goal in a 23–13 win. Timberlake’s kick against the Pittsburgh Steelers was the last field goal by any Giants kicker that season, and the only one of his NFL career.

Early in an October 24 game against the Cleveland Browns, the Giants' main placekicker twisted an ankle. Timberlake took over as the team’s full-time kicker until the season’s final week. Timberlake went 0-for-14 in field goal attempts for the rest of the season, and three of his shorter attempts were blocked.

In the 1966 pre-season, Timberlake was third on the Giants' depth chart at quarterback. In the September 1966 issue of the Sporting News, Timberlake lamented: "I’m not doing anything. For four days the other week, I didn’t throw a single pass. Not a single pass." After just one season, the Giants cut Timberlake from the team on August 29, 1966, at their camp in Fairfield, Connecticut.

In an article concluding that Timberlake may have been the worst placekicker in NFL history, the writer concluded: "Timberlake’s 1-for-15 performance makes him look like a laughingstock. He’s better remembered as one of Michigan’s great quarterbacks, a Rose Bowl hero who might have had what it took to be a fine pro quarterback or running back. It’s a shame he was asked to do what he couldn’t." Sports blog Deadspin ranked Timberlake the 2nd-worst player to ever play in the NFL, only behind quarterback Rusty Lisch.

=== Impact on the AFL–NFL merger ===
Because of Timberlake's poor performance as a kicker in 1965, the Giants signed Buffalo Bills kicker Pete Gogolak in 1966, who was also football's first soccer-style kicker. Previously, kickers kicked the ball straight on instead of at a soccer-style angle, which improved accuracy and is the standard at all levels of football today. This ended a "gentleman's agreement" between the NFL and the AFL in not signing each other's players, and would start a rash of signings that would eventually led to the two leagues merging.

In an NFL Films documentary featuring Timberlake, Steve Sabol called Timberlake the "father of the Super Bowl", because his poor performance indirectly led to the two leagues merging and the Super Bowl being formed.

== Life after football ==
Timberlake went on to become an ordained Presbyterian minister and a hospital administrator at Children's Hospital of Wisconsin, which is located in Milwaukee, Wisconsin. In 2003, Timberlake joined the faculty of Marquette University where he teaches courses on community service and faith, and mentors the student Habitat for Humanity chapter. In 2007, Timberlake said he saw the community service course as "an excellent opportunity to bring along the next generation" to address problems of neighborhood blight, poverty, family disorganization, failure in school, and incarceration for African-American males. He described the problems facing the poor as "a colossal, colossal waste of human life." Timberlake has been a volunteer for several years with Milwaukee's Habitat for Humanity chapter, and one of the courses he teaches at Marquette is called "Decent and Affordable Housing," in which students are instructed in construction methods (and use of power tools), investigate the causes of hyper-segregation, study substandard housing as a social injustice issue, and spend part of the semester at a Habitat for Humanity work site helping to build a house. The course is taught through the Civil and Environmental engineering Department, which has hired Timberlake as an adjunct professor. Timberlake, who is not an engineer by trade, has overseen the construction of eleven garages through the project. Timberlake is a proponent of gay marriage.

== See also ==
- List of Michigan Wolverines football All-Americans
