= Carl Ward =

American football player (born 1944)

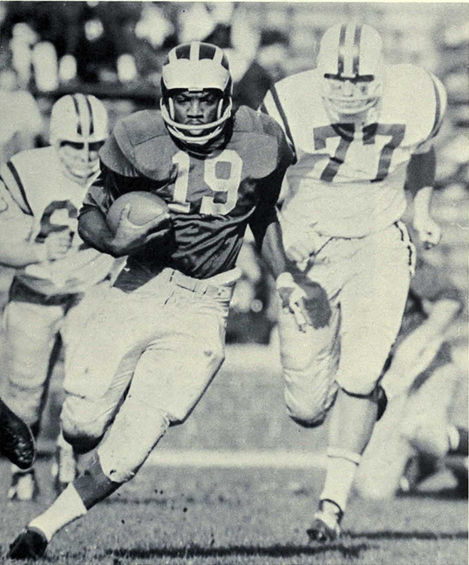
- Ward in 1964

No. 27, 21
- Positions: Halfback, Defensive back, Return specialist

Personal information
- Born: July 26, 1944 (age 82); Hartford, Alabama, U.S.
- Listed height: 5 ft 9 in (1.75 m)
- Listed weight: 180 lb (82 kg)

Career information
- High school: Taft (Cincinnati, Ohio)
- College: Michigan (1963-1966)
- NFL draft: 1967: 4th round, 83rd overall pick

Career history
- Cleveland Browns (1967–1968); New Orleans Saints (1969)

Awards and highlights
- First-team All-Big Ten (1965); 2× Second-team All-Big Ten (1964, 1966); Longest kickoff return in Cleveland Browns history

Career NFL statistics
- Interceptions: 1
- Kick/punt return yards: 907
- Touchdowns: 1
- Stats at Pro Football Reference

Carl Davis Ward (born July 26, 1944) is an American former professional football player in the National Football League (NFL). He played college football as a halfback for the Michigan Wolverines from 1964 to 1966 before playing in the NFL for the Cleveland Browns and New Orleans Saints from 1967 to 1969.

== Early life ==
Ward was born in Hartford, Alabama, in 1944. He attended Taft High School in Cincinnati, Ohio.

== Michigan ==
In 1964, Ward helped lead the Wolverines football team to their first Big Ten Conference championship since 1950, breaking the longest championship drought in school history. The 1964 Wolverines outscored their opponents 235–83, finished the regular season 8–1, and narrowly missed an undefeated season with a 21–20 loss to a Purdue Boilermakers team led by sophomore Bob Griese.

The Wolverines (ranked No. 4) advanced to the Rose Bowl where they defeated Tommy Prothro's Oregon State Beavers, 34–7, on New Year's Day. Ward gained 88 rushing yards on 10 carries in the 1965 Rose Bowl, including a 43-yard touchdown run.

Ward continued as one of the Wolverines' leading yard gainers for three consecutive years from 1964 to 1966. He was the team's leading rusher in 1965 with 639 net rushing yards and the leading kickoff returner with 193 yards on 10 kickoff returns. In a September 1966 game that matched Michigan against its 1965 Rose Bowl opponent, Ward scored to touchdowns in a 31–0 victory over Oregon State.

From 1964 to 1966, Ward totaled 2,266 all-purpose yards for Michigan, including 1,673 rushing yards, 396 yards on kickoff returns, and 188 receiving yards. His biggest single-game performances for Michigan were as follows:

Date	Opponent	Rushing yards	Receiving yards	Kickoff return yards	All-purpose yards
November 6, 1965	Illinois	139	6	27	165
November 5, 1966	Illinois	131	4	21	156
November 20, 1965	Ohio State	104	0	8	112
January 1, 1965	Oregon State	88	0	20	108
October 24, 1964	Minnesota	108	0	0	108

== Professional football ==
Ward was selected by the Cleveland Browns in the 4th round (83rd overall pick) of the 1967 NFL/AFL draft and signed with the Browns in July 1967. In the Browns' final pre-season game, Ward returned a kickoff 85 yards against the Minnesota Vikings. During the 1967 regular season, he returned 22 kickoffs for 546 yards and 6 punts for 62 yards, ranking 8th in the NFL in punt and kickoff return yardage. The highlight of Ward's rookie season came on November 26, 1967 when he returned a kickoff 104 yards for a touchdown against the Washington Redskins. His 104-yard return was the longest in Cleveland Browns franchise history and remains tied for the 15th-longest in NFL history.

During the 1968 season, Ward returned 13 kickoffs for 236 yards.

In September 1969, the New Orleans Saints acquired Ward off waivers from the Browns. Ward appeared in only two games for the Saints during the 1969 season, returning 3 kickoffs for 58 yards.
