= 1965 Rose Bowl =

American college football game

- 51st Rose Bowl Game
Michigan Wolverines	Oregon State Beavers
(8–1)	(8–2)
34	7
Head coach: Bump Elliott	Head coach: Tommy Prothro
AP / Coaches; 4 / 4	AP / Coaches; 8 / 8
	1	2	3	4	Total
Michigan	0	12	15	7	34
Oregon State	0	7	0	0	7
- Date: January 1, 1965
- Season: 1964
- Stadium: Rose Bowl
- Location: Pasadena, California
- MVP: Mel Anthony
- Favorite: Michigan by 11
- Referee: M.E. Wagner (AAWU) (split crew: AAWU, Big Ten)
- Attendance: 100,423

United States TV coverage
- Network: NBC
- Announcers: Lindsey Nelson, Ray Scott
- Nielsen ratings: 27.4

The 1965 Rose Bowl, played on January 1, 1965, was the 51st Rose Bowl Game. The Michigan Wolverines defeated the Oregon State Beavers by a score of 34–7. Michigan fullback Mel Anthony was named the Rose Bowl Player Of The Game.

== Teams ==
=== Michigan ===
The Wolverines had finished seventh in the Big Ten Conference the previous year, and had placed no higher than a tie for fifth under coach Bump Elliott. Michigan had not been to the Rose Bowl since 1951, but in 1964, they ran up an 8–1 conference record and clinched a Rose Bowl berth, taking a #4 ranking and an undefeated 3–0 postseason record into the game. Coach Elliott had been a receiver for the Wolverines in one of those games, the 1948 Rose Bowl, and had been an assistant coach at Oregon State under head coach Kip Taylor.

=== Oregon State ===
The Beavers made their third Rose Bowl appearance with a bit of controversy. Following the disbanding of the Pacific Coast Conference in 1959 due to a pay-for-play scandal, the reformed Athletic Association of Western Universities did not initially include Oregon State and Oregon. The two Oregon schools rejoined in time for the 1964 season, but the conference did not have time to reschedule a full head-to-head conference schedule. As a result, Oregon State and USC did not play each other, and when they finished with identical 3–1 conference records, the decision of which team to send to Pasadena was left to a vote among the conference's schools. At first, most people assumed Oregon State would get the nod based on their better overall record (8–2 vs. 6–3). However, when it was announced that the vote would be delayed until after USC's season ending game with top ranked and undefeated Notre Dame, many people inferred that if USC upset the Irish, they would get the nod. Indeed, USC shocked Notre Dame 20–17 so now many people assumed USC would get the Rose Bowl invitation. When the vote was taken just hours after the USC - Notre Dame game, the conferences' eight members split, four votes for both Oregon State and USC. The tiebreaker in such an instance was to eliminate the team that had more recently gone to the Rose Bowl, and Southern California had gone two years prior.

This would lead to another controversy just two years later in which an 8–2 USC team that had lost to UCLA would get voted in ahead of the 9–1 Bruins. Many felt this 1966 vote was to "make up for" the 1964 vote, especially since the coach of Oregon State in 1964 was Tommy Prothro and he was then the coach of UCLA in 1966.

== Game summary ==
Michigan was an 11-point favorite, but after a scoreless first quarter, it was the Beavers who struck first, with Paul Brothers completing a five-yard pass to Doug McDougal early in the second quarter, with Steve Clark kicking the extra point. The Beavers held the Wolverines for a while, but on their third possession following the Beavers' score, tailback Mel Anthony ran 84 yards, a Rose Bowl record at the time, for a touchdown. Richard Sygar's kick was no good. The Beavers' 7–6 advantage was short-lived, however, as on the very next possession, Carl Ward ran for 43 yards and a touchdown. While the conversion pass from Bob Timberlake to Ben Farabee was broken up, the Wolverines led 12–7 at the half.

The second half was all Michigan. Anthony blocked a punt and rushed for two more touchdowns in the third quarter, and quarterback Timberlake ran 24 yards for the final touchdown, making the final score 34–7. For his efforts, Anthony was named the game's Most Outstanding Player.

=== Scoring ===
==== First quarter ====
None.

==== Second quarter ====
- Oregon State - Doug McDougal 5 pass from Paul Brothers (Steve Clark kick)
- Michigan - Mel Anthony 84 run (Richard Sygar kick failed)
- Michigan - Carl Ward 43 run (pass failed)

==== Third quarter ====
- Michigan — Anthony 1 run (Bob Timberlake run)
- Michigan - Anthony 8 run (Timberlake kick)

==== Fourth quarter ====
- Michigan - Timberlake 24 run (Sygar kick)

== Aftermath ==
With the game, Michigan ended its 14-year postseason drought, to date their longest string of seasons without a bowl game. However, it was the last bowl game Elliott would coach; he resigned following the 1968 season after a 50–14 loss to archrival Ohio State.

This was the Beavers' last bowl game appearance for 34 years, and to date, remains their last appearance in the Rose Bowl. Soon after the game, Beaver coach Tommy Prothro left Oregon State to coach UCLA, and took them to the following year's Rose Bowl, in which the Bruins defeated Michigan State.
