= 1963 Big Ten Conference football season =

- Sport: American football
- Teams: 10
- Top draft pick: Carl Eller
- Champion: Illinois
- Runners-up: Michigan State, Ohio State
- Season MVP: Dick Butkus

Seasons
- ← 1962 1964 →

1963 Big Ten Conference football standings
	Conf.					Overall
Team	W		L		T	W		L		T
No. 3 Illinois $	5	–	1	–	1	8	–	1	–	1
No. 9 Michigan State	4	–	1	–	1	6	–	2	–	1
Ohio State	4	–	1	–	1	5	–	3	–	1
Purdue	4	–	3	–	0	5	–	4	–	0
Northwestern	3	–	4	–	0	5	–	4	–	0
Wisconsin	3	–	4	–	0	5	–	4	–	0
Michigan	2	–	3	–	2	3	–	4	–	2
Iowa	2	–	3	–	1	3	–	3	–	2
Minnesota	2	–	5	–	0	3	–	6	–	0
Indiana	1	–	5	–	0	3	–	6	–	0
$ – Conference champion; Rankings from AP Poll

The 1963 Big Ten Conference football season was the 68th season of college football played by the member schools of the Big Ten Conference and was a part of the 1963 NCAA University Division football season.

The 1963 Illinois Fighting Illini football team, under head coach Pete Elliott, won the Big Ten football championship with a record of 8–1–1, defeated Washington in the 1964 Rose Bowl, and was ranked No. 3 in the final AP Poll. Illinois center Dick Butkus received the Chicago Tribune Silver Football award as the most valuable player in the conference and was a consensus first-team All-American.

The 1963 Michigan State Spartans football team, under head coach Duffy Daugherty, compiled a 6–2–1 record, finished in second place in the conference, led the conference in scoring defense (7.0 points allowed per game), and was ranked No. 10 in the final AP Poll. Halfback Sherman Lewis was a consensus first-team All-American and finished third in the voting of the 1963 Heisman Trophy.

The Big Ten's statistical leaders included Tom Myers of Northwestern with 1,398 passing yards, Tom Nowatzke of Indiana with 756 rushing yards, and Paul Krause of Iowa with 442 receiving yards. Carl Eller of Minnesota was the first Big Ten player selected in the 1964 NFL draft with the sixth overall pick.

== Season overview ==
=== Results and team statistics ===
Conf. Rank	Team	Head coach	AP final	AP high	Overall record	Conf. record	PPG	PAG	MVP
1	Illinois	Pete Elliott	#3	#2	8–1–1	5–1–1	17.0	9.6	**Dick Butkus**
2 (tie)	Michigan State	Duffy Daugherty	#9	#4	6–2–1	4–1–1	16.4	**7.0**	Sherman Lewis
2 (tie)	Ohio State	Woody Hayes	NR	#4	5–3–1	4–1–1	12.2	11.3	Matt Snell
4	Purdue	Jack Mollenkopf	NR	NR	5–4	4–3	13.2	16.6	Ron DiGravio
5 (tie)	Northwestern	Ara Parseghian	NR	#4	5–4	3–4	**18.0**	13.8	Bill Swingle
5 (tie)	Wisconsin	Milt Bruhn	NR	#2	5–4	3–4	16.7	13.8	Jim Purnell
7	Michigan	Bump Elliott	NR	NR	3–4–2	2–3–2	14.6	14.1	Tom Keating
8	Iowa	Jerry Burns	NR	NR	3–3–2	2–3–1	15.8	14.0	Mike Reilly
9	Minnesota	Murray Warmath	NR	NR	3–6	2–5	10.6	13.0	Carl Eller
10	Indiana	Phil Dickens	NR	NR	3–6	1–5	16.8	20.9	Tom Nowatzke

Key
AP final = Team's rank in the final AP Poll of the 1963 season
AP high = Team's highest rank in the AP Poll throughout the 1963 season
PPG = Average of points scored per game
PAG = Average of points allowed per game
MVP = Most valuable player as voted by players on each team as part of the voting process to determine the winner of the Chicago Tribune Silver Football trophy; trophy winner in bold

=== Preseason ===
There were no changes in the conference's head football coaches between the 1962 and 1963 seasons.

=== Bowl games ===
On January 1, 1964, Illinois defeated Washington, 17–7.

=== Post-season developments ===
On December 14, 1963, Ara Parseghian resigned as Northwestern's head football coach to accept the same position at Notre Dame.

== Statistical leaders ==
The Big Ten's individual statistical leaders for the 1963 season include the following:

=== Passing yards ===
Rank	Name	Team	Yards
1	Tom Myers	Northwestern	1,398
2	Ron DiGravio	Purdue	1,108
3	Hal Brandt	Wisconsin	1,006
4	Richie Badar	Indiana	679
5	Gary Snook	Iowa	667

=== Rushing yards ===
Rank	Name	Team	Yards
1	Tom Nowatzke	Indiana	756
2	Jim Grabowski	Illinois	616
3	Roger Lopes	Michigan State	601
4	Sherman Lewis	Michigan State	577
5	Lou Holland	Wisconsin	511

=== Receiving yards ===
Rank	Name	Team	Yards
1	Paul Krause	Iowa	442
2	Cloyd Webb	Iowa	424
3	Gary Crum	Northwestern	417
4	Bob Hadrick	Purdue	388
5	Rick Reichardt	Wisconsin	383

=== Total yards ===
Rank	Name	Team	Yards
1	Tom Myers	Northwestern	1,292
2	Ron DiGravio	Purdue	1,154
3	Hal Brandt	Wisconsin	1,076
4	Bob Timberlake	Michigan	821
5	Richie Badar	Indiana	794

=== Scoring ===
Rank	Name	Team	Points
1	Sherman Lewis	Michigan State	54
2	Roger Lopes	Michigan State	42
2	Jim Grabowski	Illinois	42
2	Lou Holland	Wisconsin	42
5	Steve Murphy	Northwestern	36
5	Paul Krause	Iowa	36

== Awards and honors ==
=== All-Big Ten honors ===
The following players were picked by the Associated Press (AP) and/or the United Press International (UPI) as first-team players on the 1963 All-Big Ten Conference football team.

Position	Name	Team	Selectors
Quarterback	Ron DiGravio	Purdue	AP, UPI
Halfback	Sherman Lewis	Michigan State	AP, UPI
Halfback	Lou Holland	Wisconsin	AP
Halfback	Paul Warfield	Ohio State	UPI
Fullback	Tom Nowatzke	Indiana	AP, UPI
End	Chuck Logan	Northwestern	AP, UPI
End	Dan Underwood	Michigan State	AP
End	Bob Hadrick	Purdue	UPI
Tackle	Carl Eller	Minnesota	AP, UPI
Tackle	Tom Keating	Michigan	UPI
Tackle	Archie Sutton	Illinois	AP

=== All-American honors ===
At the end of the 1963 season, Big Ten players secured three of the consensus first-team picks for the 1963 College Football All-America Team. The Big Ten's consensus All-Americans were:

Position	Name	Team	Selectors
Center	Dick Butkus	Illinois	AFCA, AP, CP, FWAA, NEA, SN, UPI, Time, WCFF
Tackle	Carl Eller	Minnesota	AFCA, AP, CP, FWAA, UPI, Time, WCFF
Halfback	Sherman Lewis	Michigan State	AP, CP, UPI, WCFF

Other Big Ten players who were named first-team All-Americans by at least one selector were:

Position	Name	Team	Selectors
Guard	Mike Reilly	Iowa	FWAA
Back	Paul Warfield	Ohio State	Time

=== Other awards ===
The Heisman Trophy was awarded to Roger Staubach of Navy. Two Big Ten players finished among the top 10 in the voting for the trophy. They were: Michigan State running back Sherman Lewis (third); and Illinois center/linebacker Dick Butkus (sixth).

== 1964 NFL draft ==
The following Big Ten players were among the first 100 picks in the 1964 NFL draft:

Name	Position	Team	Round	Overall pick
Carl Eller	Defensive end	Minnesota	1	6
Marv Woodson	Halfback	Indiana	1	8
Paul Warfield	Halfback	Ohio State	1	11
Paul Krause	Safety	Iowa	2	18
Matt Snorton	End	Michigan State	2	20
Roger Pillath	Tackle	Wisconsin	3	39
Joe O'Donnell	Guard	Michigan	3	40
James Sands	Linebacker	Iowa	4	47
Wally Hilgenberg	Guard	Iowa	4	48
Matt Snell	Running back	Ohio State	4	49
Tom Keating	Defensive tackle	Michigan	4	53
Ed Lothamer	Tackle	Michigan State	5	64
Herman Johnson	Halfback	Michigan State	6	77
Jimmy Jones	End	Wisconsin	6	84
Chuck Logan	End	Northwestern	7	98
