= 1963 Michigan Wolverines football team =

American college football season

1963 Michigan Wolverines football
- Conference: Big Ten Conference
- Record: 3–4–2 (2–3–2 Big Ten)
- Head coach: Bump Elliott (5th season)
- MVP: Tom Keating
- Captain: Joe O'Donnell
- Home stadium: Michigan Stadium

1963 Big Ten Conference football standings
	Conf.					Overall
Team	W		L		T	W		L		T
No. 3 Illinois $	5	–	1	–	1	8	–	1	–	1
No. 9 Michigan State	4	–	1	–	1	6	–	2	–	1
Ohio State	4	–	1	–	1	5	–	3	–	1
Purdue	4	–	3	–	0	5	–	4	–	0
Northwestern	3	–	4	–	0	5	–	4	–	0
Wisconsin	3	–	4	–	0	5	–	4	–	0
Michigan	2	–	3	–	2	3	–	4	–	2
Iowa	2	–	3	–	1	3	–	3	–	2
Minnesota	2	–	5	–	0	3	–	6	–	0
Indiana	1	–	5	–	0	3	–	6	–	0
$ – Conference champion; Rankings from AP Poll

The 1963 Michigan Wolverines football team was an American football team that represented the University of Michigan in the 1963 Big Ten Conference football season. In its fifth year under head coach Bump Elliott, Michigan compiled a 3–4–2 record (2–3–2 against conference opponents), tied for fifth place in the Big Ten, and outscored opponents by a total of 131 to 127. The highlight of the season was an upset victory over No. 2 Illinois led by Dick Butkus, the only loss suffered by the 1963 Illinois team.

Left guard Joe O'Donnell was the team captain, and was selected by the Associated Press as a first-team guard on the 1963 All-Big Ten Conference football team. Left tackle Tom Keating received the team's most valuable player award, and was selected as a first-team All-Big Ten player by the United Press International.

The team's statistical leaders included Bob Timberlake with 593 passing yards, Mel Anthony with 394 rushing yards and 30 points scored, and John Henderson with 330 receiving yards.

== Schedule ==
Date	Opponent	Site	Result	Attendance
September 28	SMU*	Michigan Stadium; Ann Arbor, MI	W 27–16	63,659
October 5	No. 6 Navy*	Michigan Stadium; Ann Arbor, MI	L 13–26	55,877
October 12	Michigan State	Michigan Stadium; Ann Arbor, MI (rivalry)	T 7–7	101,450
October 19	Purdue	Michigan Stadium; Ann Arbor, MI	L 12–23	45,557
October 26	at Minnesota	Memorial Stadium; Minneapolis, MN (Little Brown Jug)	L 0–6	62,107
November 2	Northwestern^{†}	Michigan Stadium; Ann Arbor, MI (rivalry)	W 27–6	51,088
November 9	at No. 2 Illinois	Memorial Stadium; Champaign, Il (rivalry)	W 14–8	55,810
November 16	Iowa	Michigan Stadium; Ann Arbor, MI	T 21–21	46,582
November 30	Ohio State	Michigan Stadium; Ann Arbor, MI (rivalry)	L 10–14	36,424
*Non-conference game; ^{†}Homecoming; Rankings from AP Poll released prior to the game

== Season summary ==
=== Preseason ===
The 1962 Michigan Wolverines football team compiled a 2–7 record and was outscored, 214 to 70. At the end of the 1962 season, Joe O'Donnell was elected by his teammates to be captain of the 1963 team. Several starters from the 1962 returned in 1963, including O'Donnell, Tom Keating, and Bob Timberlake.

In May 1963, Tom Keating received the Meyer W. Morton Trophy as the team's most improved player in spring drills. Dick Sygar received the John Maulbetsch Award.

=== SMU ===
Week 1: SMU at Michigan

Team	1	2	3	4	Total
SMU	0	0	0	16	16
• Michigan	0	21	6	0	27

- Date: September 25
- Location: Ann Arbor, MI
- Game start: 1:30 p.m.
- Game attendance: 63,659

Scoring summary
2	MICH	Dick Rindfuss 19-yard run (Bob Timberlake kick)	MICH 7–0
2	MICH	Joe O'Donnell 50-yard run (Timberlake kick)	MICH 14–0
2	MICH	Bill Laskey 5-yard pass from Frosty Evashevski (Timberlake kick)	MICH 21–0
3	MICH	Mel Anthony 1-yard run (kick failed)	MICH 27–0
4	SMU	Billy Gannon 3-yard run (Danny Thomas run)	MICH 27–8
4	SMU	Thomas 1-yard run (Tenney run)	MICH 27–16

On September 28, Michigan opened its season with a 27–16 victory over Hayden Fry's SMU before a Band Day crowd of 63,659 (including 13,000 high school band members) at Michigan Stadium in Ann Arbor, Michigan. After a scoreless first quarter, Michigan scored three touchdowns in the second quarter (including a 98-yard touchdown drive following a fumble recovery by Brian Patshen and a 50-yard touchdown run by Joe O'Donnell on a fake punt) and led 27–0 at the end of the third quarter. All of SMU's points were scored in the final six-and-a-half minutes. Bob Timberlake kicked three extra points, but was unable to start at quarterback due to a shoulder injury; Frosty Evashevski (son of Forest Evashevski) played at the quarterback position in Timberlake's place.

=== Navy ===
Week 2: Navy at Michigan

Team	1	2	3	4	Total
No. 6 Navy	0	0	0	16	16
• Michigan	0	21	6	0	27

- Date: October 5
- Location: Ann Arbor, MI
- Game attendance: 55,877
- Game weather: Sunny, 74*

Scoring summary
2	NAVY	Roger Staubach 5-yard run (Marlin kick)	NAVY 7–0
2	NAVY	John Sai 54-yard pass from Staubach (kick failed)	NAVY 13–0
3	NAVY	Pat Donnelly 1-yard run (Marlin kick)	NAVY 20–0
3	MICH	John Henderson 38-yard pass from Bob Chandler (Bob Timberlake kick)	NAVY 20–7
4	NAVY	Neil Henderson 8-yard pass from Staubach (kick failed)	NAVY 26–7
4	MICH	Henderson 20-yard pass from Chandler (pass failed)	NAVY 26–13

On October 5, Michigan lost to Navy by a 26–13 score before a crowd of 55,877 at Michigan Stadium. Navy, led by junior quarterback Roger Staubach, was ranked No. 6 in the AP poll. Staubach broke his own Navy single-game record with 307 yards of total offense. He completed 14 of 16 passes for 237 yards and two touchdowns and ran for 70 yards and one touchdown. Michigan quarterback Bob Timberlake was again sidelined; Frosty Evashevski started in his place, and Bob Chandler took over in the second half. Chandler completed nine of ten passes for 138 yards and two touchdowns in a comeback that fell short.

=== Michigan State ===
Week 3: Michigan State at Michigan

Team	1	2	3	4	Total
Michigan State	0	0	7	0	7
Michigan	7	0	0	0	7

- Date: October 12
- Location: Ann Arbor, MI
- Game attendance: 101,450

Scoring summary
1	MICH	John Henderson 15-yard pass from Bob Chandler (Bob Timberlake kick)	MICH 7–0
3	MSU	Sherman Lewis 7-yard pass from Steve Juday (Lou Bobich kick)	TIE 7–7

On October 12, Michigan played to a 7–7 tie with Michigan State in their annual rivalry game. The game was played before a crowd of 101,450 at Michigan Stadium. Michigan took the lead in the first quarter on a 15-yard pass from quarterback Bob Chandler to split end John Henderson. Michigan's scoring drive began with a 26-yard punt return by Jack Clancy. The Spartans tied it up late in the third quarter on a seven-yard touchdown pass from Steve Juday to Sherman Lewis.

=== Purdue ===
Week 4: Purdue at Michigan

Team	1	2	3	4	Total
• Purdue	14	0	3	6	23
Michigan	0	0	0	12	12

- Date: October 19
- Location: Ann Arbor, MI
- Game attendance: 45,557

Scoring summary
1	PUR	Gene Donaldson 2-yard run (Gary Hogan kick)	PUR 7–0
1	PUR	Ron DiGravio 1-yard run (Hogan kick)	PUR 14–0
3	PUR	Hogan 31-yard field goal	PUR 17–0
4	PUR	Jim Morel 27-yard pass from Digravio (kick failed)	PUR 23–0
4	MICH	Bob Timberlake 1-yard run (pass failed)	PUR 23–6
4	MICH	Timberlake 14-yard run (run failed)	PUR 23–12

On October 19, Michigan lost to Purdue by a 23–12 score before a small crowd of 45,557 at Michigan Stadium. Purdue took advantage of two Michigan fumbles to take a 14–0 lead in the first quarter. The Boilermakers extended their lead to 23-0 with field goal in the third quarter and another touchdown early in the fourth quarter.

Bob Chandler started the game at quarterback, but was replaced after he fumbled on a fourth-down play at Michigan's 26-yard line. Chandler was then replaced by Frosty Evashevski, but Evashevski also turned the ball over on a misdirected pitchout. Late in the third quarter, Bob Timberlake came off the bench to take over at quarterback. He had been selected as the team's starting quarterback before the season, but a shoulder injury relegated him to kickoffs and field goals in the team's first three games. In his return to the quarterback spot, Timberlake completed 10 of 16 passes for 133 yards. He also scored two touchdowns in the fourth quarter – first on a one-yard run and 71 seconds later on a 14-yard run.

Tom Cecchini suffered a knee injury in the game that caused him to lose the remainder of the season.

=== At Minnesota ===
Week 5: Michigan at Illinois

Team	1	2	3	4	Total
Michigan	0	0	0	0	0
• No. 2 Minnesota	0	6	0	0	6

- Date: October 26
- Location: Minneapolis
- Game attendance: 62,107

Scoring summary
2	MINN	Jerry Pelletier 6-yard run (kick failed)	MINN 6–0

On October 26, Michigan lost the annual Little Brown Jug game to Minnesota by a 6–0 score before a homecoming crowd of 62,107 at Memorial Stadium in Minneapolis. The only points of the game were scored by Minnesota's 152-pound halfback Jerry Pelletier on a six-yard run in the second quarter. The kick for extra point failed. Michigan was unable to score on two drives inside Minnesota's 10-yard line and on another to the 17-yard line. Quarterback Bob Timberlake also missed a field goal from the 15-yard line. Timberlake completed 14 passes for 90 yards, and Mel Anthony rushed for 82 yards on 18 carries. Minnesota out-gained Michigan by 202 yards (157 rushing, 45 passing) to 195 yards (105 rushing, 90 passing).

=== Northwestern ===
Week 6: Northwestern at Michigan

Team	1	2	3	4	Total
Northwestern	0	0	0	16	16
• Michigan	0	21	6	0	27

- Date: November 2
- Location: Ann Arbor, MI
- Game attendance: 51,088
- Game weather: Sunny, 45*

Scoring summary
2	MICH	Jack Clancy 33-yard pass from Bob Timberlake (Timberlake kick)	MICH 7–0
3	MICH	John Henderson 23-yard interception return (Timberlake kick)	MICH 14–0
3	MICH	Henderson 24-yard pass from Timberlake (Timberlake kick)	MICH 21–0
4	MICH	Jim Conley 33-yard pass from Timberlake (pass failed)	MICH 27–0
4	NW	Dave Cyranowski 4-yard pass from Dave Milam (pass failed)	MICH 27–6

On November 2, Michigan defeated Northwestern by a 27 to 6 score before a homecoming crowd of 51,088 at Michigan Stadium. Michigan quarterback Bob Timberlake completed 12 of 20 passes for 196 yards, threw three touchdown passes, and kicked three extra points. John Henderson scored two of the Wolverines' touchdowns, one on a 24-yard touchdown pass from Timberlake and the other on 23-yard interception return. Dave Cyranowski scored Northwestern's lone touchdown with six seconds remaining.

=== At Illinois ===
Week 7: Michigan at Illinois

Team	1	2	3	4	Total
• Michigan	7	10	6	10	33
No. 2 Illinois	3	0	0	0	3

- Date: November 9
- Location: Champaign, IL
- Game attendance: 50,136

Scoring summary
2	MICH	Dick Rindfuss 3-yard run (Bob Timberlake kick)	MICH 8–0
3	ILL	Al Wheatland 1-yard run (Mike Taliaferro run)	ILL 8–7
4	MICH	Mel Anthony 1-yard run (Timberlake kick)	MICH 14–8

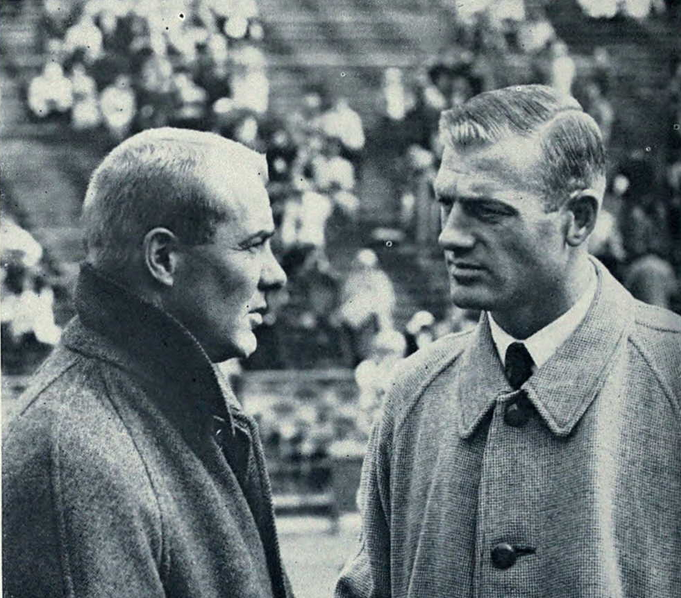
Bump and Pete Elliott

On November 9, Michigan upset undefeated Illinois by a 14 to 8 score before a crowd of 55,810 at Memorial Stadium in Champaign, Illinois. Illinois, led by All-American center/linebacker Dick Butkus and fullback Jim Grabowski, was ranked No. 2 in the AP poll prior to the game. The Wolverines, on the other hand, were unranked and arrived at the game with a 1–2–1 conference record. The game was the sixth straight victory for Bump Elliott against his brother, Pete Elliott, head coach of Illinois since 1960. The Elliott brothers played together in the backfield of Michigan's undefeated 1947 "Mad Magicians" team.

Late in the first quarter and early in the second, Bob Timberlake and Dick Rindfuss led a 56-yard touchdown drive capped by a three-yard run by Rindfuss.

Later in the second half, an Illinois drive was halted when freshman defensive back John Rowser (who later played 10 seasons in the NFL) interrupted a pass at the Michigan 10-yard line and returned it to the 20. On the last play of the first half, Rowser also broke up a pass from Mike Taliaferro to Ron Fearn at the Michigan five-yard line.

In the third quarter, a 65-yard line-drive punt by Michigan captain Joe O'Donnell rolled dead at the Illinois eight-yard line. From there, Illinois drove 92 yards in 16 plays, including a 20-yard run by Grabowski. The Illini scored their only touchdown on a one-yard run by backup fullback Al Wheatland. Rather than kick the extra point, Illinois went for two points. Taliaferro rolled out to the left side, faked a pass, and ran for the two-point conversion. Illinois led, 8–7.

With six minutes remaining in the game, Illinois back Jim Warren fumbled on a pitch from quarterback Mike Taliaferro. Rowser recovered the loose ball on the Illinois 11-yard line. Michigan scored the winning touchdown five plays later on a one-yard plunge by fullback Mel Anthony.

Late in the game, Rowser halted yet another Illinois drive by recovering another fumble—his third turnover of the game. The game was largely a defensive battle, as Illinois out-gained Michigan in total yards by a margin of 295 to 154. Timberlake completed only seven of 22 passes and gave up two interceptions. Rindfuss was Michigan's leading rusher with a total of only 35 yards on 13 carries.

=== Iowa ===
Week 8: Iowa at Michigan

Team	1	2	3	4	Total
Iowa	0	14	0	7	21
Michigan	7	0	14	0	21

- Date: November 16
- Location: Ann Arbor, MI
- Game attendance: 46,582

Scoring summary
2	MICH	Mel Anthony 13-yard run (Bob Timberlake kick)	MICH 7–0
2	IOWA	Gary Snook 13-yard run (Roberts kick)	TIE 7–7
2	IOWA	Cloyd Webb 12-yard pass from Snook (Roberts kick)	IOWA 14–7
3	MICH	Anthony 1-yard run (pass failed)	IOWA 14–13
3	MICH	Anthony 1-yard run (John Henderson pass from Timberlake)	MICH 21–14
4	IOWA	Paul Krause 25-yard pass from Snook (Roberts kick)	TIE 21–21

On November 16, Michigan tied with Iowa, 21–21, before a crowd of 46,582 at Michigan Stadium.

On its second drive, Iowa advanced the ball to Michigan's two-yard line on a 49-yard reception by Paul Krause. OnMel Anthony scored all three Michigan touchdowns on runs of 13 yards, one yard, and one yard. For Iowa, Gary Snook was responsible for all three Hawkeye touchdowns on a 14-yard run and touchdown passes to Cloyd Webb and Paul Krause. The drive was halted when Gary Snook fumbled and Tom Keating recovered the ball. Michigan then drove 94 yards for a touchdown on a 13-yard run by Mel Anthony to take a 7–0 lead.

Iowa took the lead with two touchdowns (scored within four minutes of the other) in the second quarter. Snook ran 13 yards for the first and passed 12 yards to Cloyd Webb for the second. Shortly before halftime, Michigan back Dick Rindfuss fumbled at Iowa's four-yard line.

At the start of the third quarter, Michigan drove 59 yards for a touchdown. Mel Anthony scored on a one-yard dive over the left tackle. Bob Timberlake's pass for a two-point conversion was knocked down in the end zone. Midway through the third quarter, Anthony ran three yards for his third touchdown of the game. This time, Timberake's pass for a two-point conversion was caught by (John Henderson.

At the end of the third quarter, Anthony fumbled with Michigan ahead, 21–14, and the Hawkeyes scored the game-tying touchdown on the possession that followed. Timberlake missed a game-winning field goal from the 29-yard line midway through the fourth quarter, Iowa's kicker, Jay Roberts, missed one from the 35-yard line five minutes later.

Michigan rushed for 276 yards, including 137 on 24 carries by Timberlake. Timberlake's 137 yards was the highest single-game rushing total to that point in Bump Elliott's five-year tenure as head coach. Mel Anthony added 83 rushing yards. In total yardage, Michigan out-gained the Hawkeyes by 369 yards to 366.

=== Ohio State ===
Week 9: Ohio State at Michigan

Team	1	2	3	4	Total
• Ohio State	0	7	0	7	14
Michigan	3	7	0	0	10

- Date: November 40
- Location: Ann Arbor, MI
- Game attendance: 36,424

Scoring summary
1	MICH	Bob Timberlake 28-yard field goal	MICH 3–0
2	MICH	Dick Rindfuss 1-yard run (Timberlake kick)	MICH 10–0
2	OHIO	Paul Warfield 35-yard pass from Don Unverferth (Van Raaphorst kick)	MICH 10–7
4	OHIO	Unverferth 5-yard run (Van Raaphorst kick)	OHIO 14–10

On November 30, Michigan lost its annual rivalry game to Ohio State by a 14–10 score at Michigan Stadium. The game was originally scheduled to be played on November 23. President John F. Kennedy was assassinated on November 22, and the Michigan athletic department announced that night that the game would not be postponed. On game day, the game was abruptly postponed. The game was ultimately played on the Saturday after Thanksgiving and drew a crowd of only 36,424 – the smallest crowd at Michigan Stadium since November 1958.

Michigan took a 10–0 lead in the second quarter on a 28-yard field goal by Bob Timberlake and a one-yard touchdown run by Dick Rindfuss. Ohio State narrowed Michigan's lead with a 35-yard touchdown pass from Don Unverferth to Paul Warfield later in the second quarter, but Michigan held the lead until midway through the fourth quarter. Quarterback Don Unverferth scored the game-winning touchdown on a five-yard run.

=== Postseason ===
Two Michigan players received first-team honors on the 1963 All-Big Ten Conference football team:

- Left tackle Tom Keating received the team's most valuable player award and was selected by the United Press International as a first-team All-Big Ten player.
- Left guard and team captain Joe O'Donnell was selected by the Associated Press as a first-team All-Big Ten guard.

Keating was also selected by his teammates as the team's most valuable player.

The 1964 NFL draft was held on December 2, 1963. Three Michigan players were selected:

- Joe O'Donnell was selected by the Green Bay Packers in the third round with the 40th overall pick.
- Tom Keating was selected by the Minnesota Vikings in the fourth round with the 53rd overall pick.
- Tackle John Houtman was selected by the Cleveland Browns in the 15th round with the 207th overall pick.

== Statistical leaders ==
Michigan's individual statistical leaders for the 1963 season include those listed below.

=== Rushing ===
Player	Attempts	Net yards	Yards per attempt	Touchdowns
Mel Anthony	103	394	3.8	5
Bob Timberlake	98	228	2.3	1
Dick Rindfuss	58	211	3.6	3

=== Passing ===
Player	Attempts	Completions	Interceptions	Comp %	Yards	Yds/Comp	TD
Bob Timberlake	98	47	4	48.0	593	12.6	3
Bob Chandler	33	16	2	48.5	216	13.5	3
Forest Evashevski, Jr.	23	12	3	52.2	154	12.8	1

=== Receiving ===
Player	Receptions	Yards	Yds/Recp	TD	Long
John Henderson	27	330	12.2	4	10
Craig Kirby	13	166	12.8	0	24
Jim Conley	6	114	19.0	1	33

=== Kickoff returns ===
Player	Returns	Yards	Yds/Return	TD	Long
Jack Clancy	9	221	24.6	0	33
Harvey Chapman	2	62	31.0	0	
Dick Rindfuss	4	56	14.0	0	23

=== Punt returns ===
Player	Returns	Yards	Yds/Return	TD	Long
Jack Clancy	10	105	10.5	0	15
Dick Rindfuss	11	96	8.7	0	4
Richard Wells	4	25	6.3	0	

=== Points scored ===
Player	Touchdowns	Field goals	Extra points	Points scored
Mel Anthony	5	0	0	30
John Henderson	4	0	0	24
Dick Rindfuss	3	0	0	18

== Personnel ==
=== Letter winners ===
The following player received letters for their participation on the 1963 Michigan football team. Player starting five or more games are displayed in bold.

- Dennis Alix, 6'0", 185 pounds, senior, West Bloomfield, MI - quarterback
- Mel Anthony, 6'0", 202 pounds, junior, Cincinnati, OH - started 3 games at fullback
- Tom Cecchini, 6'0", 195 pounds, sophomore, Detroit - started 4 games at center
- Robert Chandler, 6'3", 208 pounds, senior, LaGrange, IL - started 3 games at quarterback
- Harvey Chapman, Jr., 5'11", 177 pounds, senior, Farmington Hills, MI - halfback
- **Jack Clancy**, 6'1", 196 pounds, sophomore, Detroit - started 9 games at left halfback
- **Jim Conley**, 6'3", 191 pounds, junior, Springdale, PA - started 7 games at left end
- Chuck Dehlin, 5'11", 198 pounds, sophomore, Flushing, MI - started 2 games at fullback
- William Dodd, 6'0", 204 pounds, senior Virden, IL - halfback
- Forest "Frosty" Evashevski, Jr., 6'0", 185 pounds, senior, Iowa City, IA - started 1 game at quarterback
- Ben Farabee, 6'3", 206 pounds, junior, Holland, MI - end
- James Green, 6'1", 210 pounds, junior, Trenton, MI - center
- **Richard Hahn**, 6'0", 206 pounds, junior, Norton Village, OH - started 6 games at right guard
- John Henderson, 6'3", 185 pounds, junior, Dayton, OH - started 3 games at right end
- John Houtman, 6'4", 244 pounds, senior, Adrian, MI - started 1 game at right tackle
- Jeffrey Hoyne, 6'1", 197 pounds, sophomore, Chicago - end
- **Tom Keating**, 6'3", 240 pounds, senior, Chicago - started 9 games at left tackle
- Craig Kirby, 6'1", 179 pounds, sophomore, Royal Oak, MI - started 2 games at left end
- David Kovacevich, 5'10", 215 pounds, senior, Chicago - guard
- David Kurtz, 6'0", 214 pounds, senior, Toledo, OH - guard
- **Bill Laskey**, 6'1", 211 pounds, junior, Milan, MI - started 6 games at right end
- Gerald Mader, 6'3", 220 pounds, junior, Chicago - tackle
- John Marcum, 6'0", 208 pounds, junior, Monroe, MI - started 3 games at right guard
- **Joe O'Donnell**, 6'2", 238 pounds, senior, Milan, MI - started 9 games at left guard
- **Brian Patchen**, 5'11", 210 pounds, junior, Steubenville, OH - started 5 games at center
- Thomas Pritchard, 5'10", 180 pounds, senior, Marion, OH - quarterback
- Richard Ries, 6'2", 225 pounds, sophomore, Royal Oak, MI - guard
- **Dick Rindfuss**, 6'0", 192 pounds, junior, Niles, OH - started 9 games at right halfback
- John Rowser, 6'0", 175 pounds, sophomore, Detroit - halfback
- Charles Ruzicka, 6'1", 239 pounds, sophomore, Skokie, IL - tackle
- Stephen Smith, 6'5", 228 pounds, sophomore, Park Ridge, IL - end
- R. Wayne Sparkman, 5'11", 186 pounds, senior, Plymouth, MI - started 4 games at fullback
- Richard Szymanski, 5'10", 185 pounds, senior, Toledo, OH - center
- **Bob Timberlake**, 6'4", 211 pounds, junior, Franklin, OH - started 5 games at quarterback
- Richard Wells, 5'9", 172 pounds, sophomore, Grand Rapids, MI - halfback
- Paul Woodward, 6'2", 216 pounds, junior, Cincinnati - guard
- **Bill Yearby**, 6'3", 223 pounds, sophomore, Detroit - started 8 games at right tackle

=== Freshmen ===
- Mike Bass, 5'11", 175 pounds, freshman, Ypsilanti, MI - halfback
- Dave Fisher, 5'10", 200 pounds, freshman, Kettering, OH - fullback
- Wally Gabler, 6'1", 185 pounds, freshman, Royal Oak, MI - quarterback
- Frank Nunley, 6'1", 220 pounds, freshman, Belleville, MI - center
- Dick Vidmer, 6'0", 180 pounds, freshman, Greensburg, PA - quarterback
- Rich Volk, 6'2", 185 pounds, freshman, Wauseon, OH - quarterback
- Carl Ward, 5'9", 180 pounds, freshman, Cincinnati - halfback
- Clayton Wilhite, 6'4", 195 pounds, freshman, Bay City, MI - end

=== Coaching staff ===
- Head coach: Bump Elliott
- Assistant coaches:

- Don Dufek, Sr. - defensive backfield coach
- Dennis Fitzgerald - freshman coach
- Henry Fonde - offensive backfield coach
- Jack Fouts - offensive line coach
- Bob Hollway - defensive line coach
- Jack Nelson - ends coach

- Trainer: Jim Hunt
- Team physician: Dr. A. W. Coxon
- Senior manager: Gustav Schulwitz
