= 1963 Illinois Fighting Illini football team =

American college football season

1963 Illinois Fighting Illini football

Big Ten champion Rose Bowl champion

Rose Bowl, W 17–7 vs. Washington
- Conference: Big Ten Conference

Ranking
- Coaches: No. 4
- AP: No. 3
- Record: 8–1–1 (5–1–1 Big Ten)
- Head coach: Pete Elliott (4th season)
- MVP: Dick Butkus
- Captains: Mike Taliaferro; Dick Deller
- Home stadium: Memorial Stadium

1963 Big Ten Conference football standings
	Conf.					Overall
Team	W		L		T	W		L		T
No. 3 Illinois $	5	–	1	–	1	8	–	1	–	1
No. 9 Michigan State	4	–	1	–	1	6	–	2	–	1
Ohio State	4	–	1	–	1	5	–	3	–	1
Purdue	4	–	3	–	0	5	–	4	–	0
Northwestern	3	–	4	–	0	5	–	4	–	0
Wisconsin	3	–	4	–	0	5	–	4	–	0
Michigan	2	–	3	–	2	3	–	4	–	2
Iowa	2	–	3	–	1	3	–	3	–	2
Minnesota	2	–	5	–	0	3	–	6	–	0
Indiana	1	–	5	–	0	3	–	6	–	0
$ – Conference champion; Rankings from AP Poll

The 1963 Illinois Fighting Illini football team was an American football team that represented the University of Illinois as a member of the Big Ten Conference during the 1963 Big Ten season. In their fourth year under head coach Pete Elliott, the Fighting Illini compiled an 8–1–1 record (5–1–1 in conference games), won the Big Ten championship, and outscored opponents by a total of 153 to 89. They concluded the season with a 17–7 victory over Washington in the 1964 Rose Bowl. The Illini's sole loss was a 14–8 defeat against Michigan. They were ranked No. 3 in the final AP poll.

Illinois center and linebacker Dick Butkus was selected as the team's most valuable player, won the 1963 Chicago Tribune Silver Football as the Big Ten's most valuable player, and was honored as a unanimous first-team player on the 1963 All-America team. Tackle Archie Sutton was selected by the Newspaper Enterprise Association (NEA) as a second-team All-American.

The team's statistical leaders included quarterback Mike Taliaferro (434 passing yards, 41.8% completion percentage), fullback Jim Grabowski (491 rushing yards, 4.2 yards per carry), and wide receiver Bill Pasko (131 receiving yards).

The team played its home games at Memorial Stadium in Champaign, Illinois.

== Schedule ==
Date	Opponent	Rank	Site	Result	Attendance	Source
September 28	California*		Memorial Stadium; Champaign, IL	W 10–0	42,357	
October 5	No. 4 Northwestern		Memorial Stadium; Champaign, IL (rivalry)	W 10–9	51,286	
October 12	at No. 8 Ohio State		Ohio Stadium; Columbus, OH (Illibuck)	T 20–20	84,712	
October 19	Minnesota	No. 7	Memorial Stadium; Champaign, IL	W 16–6	61,229	
October 25	at UCLA*	No. 4	Los Angeles Memorial Coliseum; Los Angeles, CA	W 18–12	24,616	
November 2	Purdue	No. 2	Memorial Stadium; Champaign, IL (rivalry)	W 41–21	61,796	
November 9	Michigan	No. 2	Memorial Stadium; Champaign, IL (rivalry)	L 8–14	55,810	
November 16	at Wisconsin	No. 8	Camp Randall Stadium; Madison, WI	W 17–7	65,418	
November 28	at No. 4 Michigan State	No. 8	Spartan Stadium; East Lansing, MI	W 13–0	74,342	
January 1	vs. Washington*	No. 3	Rose Bowl; Pasadena, CA (Rose Bowl)	W 17–7	96,957	
*Non-conference game; Rankings from AP Poll released prior to the game; Source:

== Players ==
- Dick Butkus - center/linebacker
- Jim Grabowski - running back
- Sammy Price - running back
- Gregg Schumacher - end
- Archie Sutton - tackle
- Mike Taliaferro - quarterback
- Wylie Fox - lineman
- Rich Callaghan - end (offense & defense)

== Awards and honors ==
- Dick Butkus (Linebacker)
  - Chicago Tribune Silver Football
  - Consensus First-Team All-American (linebacker)
  - All-American (center)
- Archie Sutton (Tackle)
  - All-American (tackle)

== Roster ==
Player	Position
Bill Pasko	End
Neal Anderson
Jim Plankenhorn	Offensive Tackle, Placekicker
Al Wheatland	Halfback
Mike Taliaferro (co-captain)	Quarterback
Dick Deller (co-captain)	Guard
Ron Fearn	Fullback
Mike Dundy	Defensive back
Dave Anderson
Jim Warren	Halfback
Sammy Price	Halfback
Gary Eickman	Tackle
Jim Wainwright
Lynn Stewart	Offensive Tackle
Bob Easter	Offensive Tackle
Dee Rutherford
Dick Butkus	Center/Linebacker
Todd Gabbett	Guard
Rich Callaghan	End (offense & defense)
Fred Custardo	Quarterback, Placekicker
Larry Justiz
Tony Parola
Barry Deist
Les Feuquay
Dick Dorr
Hal Wineland
Ken Schreiner	Guard
Mario Camanaro
Paul Upton
Bill Minor	Guard
Hugh Woodson
Gregg Schumacher	End
Dennis Senkowski
Bruce Capel
Art McCaskill
Wayne Paulson	Halfback
Dave Mueller
George Donnelly	Defensive Back
Dick Kee
Dick Hochleutner
Charles Galbreath
Wylie Fox	Guard
Terry Fairbanks
Jim Grabowski	Halfback
Kai Anderson
Dick Fitzgerald
Ron Acks	Fullback, Linebacker
Mike Summers
Ken Nietupski	Tackle
Wayne Strauch
Joe Wolfe
Ed Walsh
Jack Maggiore	Offensive Lineman
Dave DeWolf
Bill Farrell
Jim Unrath
Steve Kimbell
Royce Neisz
John Willis
Archie Sutton	Offensive Tackle
Bob Petkus
Don Hansen	Linebacker
Eddie Russell
Dave Russell
Dave Powless	Guard
Dale Greco
John Walker
Bernie McCabe
Ed Terrill
Bill Harper
Brian Duniec	Guard
Ed Washington	Offensive Tackle

- Head coach: Pete Elliott (3rd year at Illinois)
