= 1963 Wisconsin Badgers football team =

American college football season

1963 Wisconsin Badgers football
- Conference: Big Ten Conference
- Record: 5–4 (3–4 Big Ten)
- Head coach: Milt Bruhn (8th season)
- MVP: Jim Purnell
- Captains: Ken Bowman; Andy Wojdula
- Home stadium: Camp Randall Stadium

1963 Big Ten Conference football standings
	Conf.					Overall
Team	W		L		T	W		L		T
No. 3 Illinois $	5	–	1	–	1	8	–	1	–	1
No. 9 Michigan State	4	–	1	–	1	6	–	2	–	1
Ohio State	4	–	1	–	1	5	–	3	–	1
Purdue	4	–	3	–	0	5	–	4	–	0
Northwestern	3	–	4	–	0	5	–	4	–	0
Wisconsin	3	–	4	–	0	5	–	4	–	0
Michigan	2	–	3	–	2	3	–	4	–	2
Iowa	2	–	3	–	1	3	–	3	–	2
Minnesota	2	–	5	–	0	3	–	6	–	0
Indiana	1	–	5	–	0	3	–	6	–	0
$ – Conference champion; Rankings from AP Poll

The 1963 Wisconsin Badgers football team was an American football team that represented the University of Wisconsin as a member of the Big Ten Conference during the 1963 Big Ten season. In their eighth year under head coach Milt Bruhn, the Badgers compiled a 5–4 record (3–4 in conference games), tied for fifth place in the Big Ten, and outscored opponents by a total of 150 to 124.

The Badgers gained an average of 156.6 passing yards and 163.8 rushing yards per game. On defense, they gave up an average of 99.6 passing yards and 163.4 rushing yards per game. The team's individual statistical leaders included: quarterback Hal Brandt (1,006 passing yards); halfback Lou Holland (511 rushing yards); and halfback Rick Reichardt (26 receptions for 383 yards).

Linebacker Jim Purnell was selected as the team's most valuable player. Ken Bowman and Andy Wojdula were the team captains. Five Wisconsin players received first- or second-team honors from the Associated Press (AP) or United Press International (UPI) on the 1963 All-Big Ten Conference football team: Holland at halfback (AP-1, UPI-2); Roger Pillath (AP-2, UPI-2); Jimmy Jones at end (UPI-2); Ken Bowman at center (UPI-2); and Reichardt at halfback (UPI-3).

The Badgers played their home games at Camp Randall Stadium in Madison, Wisconsin.

== Schedule ==
Date	Opponent	Rank	Site	Result	Attendance	Source
September 21	Western Michigan*	No. 7	Camp Randall Stadium; Madison, WI	W 41–0	48,574	
September 28	at Notre Dame*	No. 6	Notre Dame Stadium; Notre Dame, IN	W 14–9	56,806	
October 12	Purdue	No. 5	Camp Randall Stadium; Madison, WI	W 38–20	61,415	
October 19	at Iowa	No. 2	Iowa Stadium; Iowa City, IA (rivalry)	W 10–7	59,700	
October 26	Ohio State	No. 2	Camp Randall Stadium; Madison, WI	L 10–13	65,319	
November 2	at Michigan State	No. 8	Spartan Stadium; East Lansing, MI	L 13–30	71,033	
November 9	Northwestern^{†}		Camp Randall Stadium; Madison, WI	W 17–14	65,388	
November 16	No. 8 Illinois		Camp Randall Stadium; Madison, WI	L 7–17	65,418	
November 28	at Minnesota		Memorial Stadium; Minneapolis, MN (rivalry)	L 0–14	55,271	
*Non-conference game; ^{†}Homecoming; Rankings from AP Poll released prior to the game; Source:

== 1964 NFL draft ==
Player	Position	Round	Pick	NFL club
Roger Pillath	Tackle	3	39	Los Angeles Rams
Jimmy Jones	End	6	84	Chicago Bears
Bob Johnson	End	8	108	St. Louis Cardinals
Ken Bowman	Center	8	111	Green Bay Packers
