= 1963 Michigan State Spartans football team =

American college football season

1963 Michigan State Spartans football
- Conference: Big Ten Conference

Ranking
- Coaches: No. 10
- AP: No. 10
- Record: 6–2–1 (4–1–1 Big Ten)
- Head coach: Duffy Daugherty (10th season)
- MVP: Sherman Lewis
- Captains: Sherman Lewis; Dan Underwood
- Home stadium: Spartan Stadium

1963 Big Ten Conference football standings
	Conf.					Overall
Team	W		L		T	W		L		T
No. 3 Illinois $	5	–	1	–	1	8	–	1	–	1
No. 9 Michigan State	4	–	1	–	1	6	–	2	–	1
Ohio State	4	–	1	–	1	5	–	3	–	1
Purdue	4	–	3	–	0	5	–	4	–	0
Northwestern	3	–	4	–	0	5	–	4	–	0
Wisconsin	3	–	4	–	0	5	–	4	–	0
Michigan	2	–	3	–	2	3	–	4	–	2
Iowa	2	–	3	–	1	3	–	3	–	2
Minnesota	2	–	5	–	0	3	–	6	–	0
Indiana	1	–	5	–	0	3	–	6	–	0
$ – Conference champion; Rankings from AP Poll

The 1963 Michigan State Spartans football team represented Michigan State University in the 1963 Big Ten Conference football season. In their 10th season under head coach Duffy Daugherty, the Spartans compiled a 6–2–1 overall record 4–1–1 against Big Ten opponents), finished in second place in the Big Ten Conference, and were ranked #9 in the final AP Poll.

Two Spartans were selected as first-team players on the 1963 All-Big Ten Conference football team. Halfback Sherman Lewis received first-team honors from the Associated Press (AP) and United Press International (UPI), and end Dan Underwood received first-team honors from the AP. Lewis was also a consensus first-team All-American.

== Schedule ==
Date	Opponent	Rank	Site	Result	Attendance	Source
September 28	North Carolina*		Spartan Stadium; East Lansing, MI	W 31–0	60,832	
October 4	at No. 8 USC*		Los Angeles Memorial Coliseum; Los Angeles, CA	L 10–13	59,137	
October 12	at Michigan		Michigan Stadium; Ann Arbor, MI (rivalry)	T 7–7	101,450	
October 19	Indiana		Spartan Stadium; East Lansing, MI (rivalry)	W 20–3	52,297	
October 26	at No. 9 Northwestern		Dyche Stadium; Evanston, IL	W 15–7	51,013	
November 2	No. 8 Wisconsin^{†}		Spartan Stadium; East Lansing, MI	W 30–13	71,033	
November 9	at Purdue	No. 9	Ross–Ade Stadium; West Lafayette, IN	W 23–0	45,137	
November 16	Notre Dame*	No. 4	Spartan Stadium; East Lansing, MI (rivalry)	W 12–7	70,128	
November 28	No. 8 Illinois	No. 4	Spartan Stadium; East Lansing, MI	L 0–13	74,342	
*Non-conference game; ^{†}Homecoming; Rankings from AP Poll released prior to the game
