= 1963 Iowa Hawkeyes football team =

American college football season

1963 Iowa Hawkeyes football
- Conference: Big Ten Conference
- Record: 3–3–2 (2–3–1 Big Ten)
- Head coach: Jerry Burns (3rd season)
- MVP: Mike Reilly
- Captains: Paul Krause; Wally Hilgenberg
- Home stadium: Iowa Stadium

1963 Big Ten Conference football standings
	Conf.					Overall
Team	W		L		T	W		L		T
No. 3 Illinois $	5	–	1	–	1	8	–	1	–	1
No. 9 Michigan State	4	–	1	–	1	6	–	2	–	1
Ohio State	4	–	1	–	1	5	–	3	–	1
Purdue	4	–	3	–	0	5	–	4	–	0
Northwestern	3	–	4	–	0	5	–	4	–	0
Wisconsin	3	–	4	–	0	5	–	4	–	0
Michigan	2	–	3	–	2	3	–	4	–	2
Iowa	2	–	3	–	1	3	–	3	–	2
Minnesota	2	–	5	–	0	3	–	6	–	0
Indiana	1	–	5	–	0	3	–	6	–	0
$ – Conference champion; Rankings from AP Poll

The 1963 Iowa Hawkeyes football team was an American football team that represented the University of Iowa as a member of the Big Ten Conference during the 1963 Big Ten football season. In their third year under head coach Jerry Burns, the Hawkeyes compiled a 3–3–2 record (2–3–1 in conference game), finished eighth in the Big Ten, and outscored opponents by a total of 126 to 112. Iowa's game against Notre Dame was canceled on November 23, one day following the assassination of John F. Kennedy.

The 1963 Hawkeyes gained 1,047 rushing yards and 1,165 passing yards. On defense, they gave up 1,329 rushing yards and 921 passing yards.

The team's statistical leaders included quarterback Matt Szykowny (79-of-120 passing, 1,078 yards), fullback Bill Perkins (380 rushing yards), end Cloyd Webb (25 receptions for 425 yards), and fullback Joe Williams (54 points scored, including a 100-yard kickoff return for touchdown against Notre Dame). Guard/linebacker Mike Reilly was selected by the Football Writers Association of America for Look magazine as a first-team All-American. Reilly was also selected as the team's most valuable player. Halfback Paul Krause and guard Wally Hilgenberg were the team captains.

The team played its home games at Iowa Stadium in Iowa City, Iowa. Home attendance totaled 230,200, an average of 57,500 per game. The per game attendance from 1961 was a school record until 1979.

== Schedule ==
Date	Opponent	Site	Result	Attendance	Source
September 28	Washington State*	Iowa Stadium; Iowa City, IA	T 14–14	52,600	
October 5	at Washington*	Husky Stadium; Seattle, WA	W 17–7	55,200	
October 12	Indiana^{†}	Iowa Stadium; Iowa City, IA	W 37–26	56,800	
October 19	No. 2 Wisconsin	Iowa Stadium; Iowa City, IA (rivalry)	L 7–10	59,700	
October 26	at Purdue	Ross–Ade Stadium; West Lafayette, IN	L 0–14	47,921	
November 2	at No. 9 Ohio State	Ohio Stadium; Columbus, OH	L 3–7	83,163	
November 9	Minnesota	Iowa Stadium; Iowa City, IA (rivalry)	W 27–13	59,300	
November 16	at Michigan	Michigan Stadium; Ann Arbor, MI	T 21–21	46,582	
November 23	Notre Dame*	Iowa Stadium; Iowa City, IA	Cancelled		
*Non-conference game; ^{†}Homecoming; Rankings from AP Poll released prior to the game

== Roster ==
1963 Iowa Hawkeyes football team roster
Players
Coaches
Offense

Pos.	#	Name	Class
WR		Cloyd Webb	Sr
OL	67	Wally Hilgenberg	Sr

Defense

Pos.	#	Name	Class
DB	16	Paul Krause	Sr
LB	61	Mike Reilly	Sr

Special teams

Pos.	#	Name	Class

Head coach

- Jerry Burns

Coordinators/assistant coaches

Legend

- (C) Team captain
- (S) Suspended
- (I) Ineligible
- Injured
- Redshirt

== Players in the 1964 NFL draft ==
Player	Position	Round	Pick	NFL club	Ref
Paul Krause	Safety	2	18	Washington Redskins	
Mike Reilly	Linebacker	4	47	Chicago Bears	
Wally Hilgenberg	Guard	4	48	Detroit Lions	
Bob Sherman	Halfback	12	163	Pittsburgh Steelers	
Cloyd Webb	Linebacker	13	182	Chicago Bears	
Constantinos Kasapis	Tackle	17	238	Chicago Bears	
