= 1963 Ohio State Buckeyes football team =

American college football season

1963 Ohio State Buckeyes football
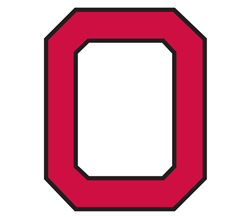
- Conference: Big Ten Conference
- Record: 5–3–1 (4–1–1 Big Ten)
- Head coach: Woody Hayes (13th season)
- MVP: Matt Snell
- Captains: Ormonde Ricketts; Matt Snell
- Home stadium: Ohio Stadium

1963 Big Ten Conference football standings
	Conf.					Overall
Team	W		L		T	W		L		T
No. 3 Illinois $	5	–	1	–	1	8	–	1	–	1
No. 9 Michigan State	4	–	1	–	1	6	–	2	–	1
Ohio State	4	–	1	–	1	5	–	3	–	1
Purdue	4	–	3	–	0	5	–	4	–	0
Northwestern	3	–	4	–	0	5	–	4	–	0
Wisconsin	3	–	4	–	0	5	–	4	–	0
Michigan	2	–	3	–	2	3	–	4	–	2
Iowa	2	–	3	–	1	3	–	3	–	2
Minnesota	2	–	5	–	0	3	–	6	–	0
Indiana	1	–	5	–	0	3	–	6	–	0
$ – Conference champion; Rankings from AP Poll

The 1963 Ohio State Buckeyes football team was an American football team that represented the Ohio State University as a member of the Big Ten Conference during the 1963 Big Ten season. In their 13th year under head coach Woody Hayes, the Buckeyes compiled a 5–3–1 record (4–1–1 in conference games), tied for second place in the Big Ten, and outscored opponents by a total of 110 to 102.

The team's statistical leaders included quarterback Don Unverferth (586 passing yards, 41.0% completion percentage), fullback Matt Snell (491 rushing yards, 3.7 yards per carry), and halfback Paul Warfield (22 receptions for 266 yards). Warfield received first-team honors from the UPI on the 1963 All-Big Ten Conference football team.

The team played its home games at Ohio Stadium in Columbus, Ohio.

== Schedule ==
Date	Time	Opponent	Rank	Site	Result	Attendance	Source
September 28	1:30 p.m.	Texas A&M*		Ohio Stadium; Columbus, OH	W 17–0	81,241	
October 5	1:30 p.m.	at Indiana		Seventeenth Street Football Stadium; Bloomington, IN	W 21–0	42,296	
October 12	1:30 p.m.	Illinois	No. 8	Ohio Stadium; Columbus, OH (Illibuck)	T 20–20	84,712	
October 19	3:30 p.m.	at USC*	No. 4	Los Angeles Memorial Coliseum; Los Angeles, CA	L 3–32	61,883	
October 26	2:30 p.m.	at No. 2 Wisconsin		Camp Randall Stadium; Madison, WI	W 13–10	65,319	
November 2	1:30 p.m.	Iowa	No. 9	Ohio Stadium; Columbus, OH	W 7–3	83,163	
November 9	2:00 p.m.	Penn State*	No. 10	Ohio Stadium; Columbus, OH (rivalry)	L 7–10	83,519	
November 16	1:30 p.m.	Northwestern		Ohio Stadium; Columbus, OH	L 8–17	83,988	
November 30	1:30 p.m.	at Michigan		Michigan Stadium; Ann Arbor, MI (rivalry)	W 14–10	36,424	
*Non-conference game; Rankings from AP Poll released prior to the game; All times are in Eastern time

== Game summaries ==
=== Texas A&M ===
Team	1	2	3	4	Total
Texas A&M	0	0	0	0	0
• Ohio St	7	0	7	3	17

- Date: September 28
- Location: Ohio Stadium, Columbus, OH
- Game attendance: 81,241
- Game weather: Cloudy; 82 °F (28 °C)

Scoring summary
Q1	3:11	OHST	Snell 1-yard run (Van Raaphorst kick)	OHST 7–0
Q3	2:29	OHST	Snell 1-yard run (Van Raaphorst kick)	OHST 14–0
Q4	12:44	OHST	Van Raaphorst 37-yard field goal	OHST 17–0

=== Indiana ===
Team	1	2	3	4	Total
• Ohio St	9	0	0	12	21
Indiana	0	0	0	0	0

- Date: October 5
- Location: Seventeenth Street Football Stadium, Bloomington, IN
- Game attendance: 42,296
- Game weather: Clear 76 °F (24 °C)

Scoring summary
Q1	3:32	OHST	Van Raaphorst 48-yard field goal	OHST 3–0
Q1	0:56	OHST	Lashutka 24-yard pass from Unverferth (kick failed)	OHST 9–0
Q4	11:07	OHST	Van Raaphorst 19-yard field goal	OHST 12–0
Q4	9:12	OHST	Safety, Malinchak tackled in end zone	OHST 14–0
Q4	4:12	OHST	Warfield 4-yard pass from Unverferth (Van Raaphorst kick)	OHST 21–0

=== Illinois ===
Team	1	2	3	4	Total
Illinois	7	0	0	13	20
Ohio St	0	3	14	3	20

- Date: October 12
- Location: Ohio Stadium, Columbus, OH
- Game attendance: 84,712
- Game weather: Sunny; 68 °F (20 °C)

Scoring summary
Q1	4:50	ILL	Price 1-yard run (Plankenhorn kick)	ILL 7–0
Q2	3:29	OHST	Van Raaphorst 27-yard field goal	ILL 7–3
Q3	6:52	OHST	Snell 1-yard run (Van Raaphorst kick)	OHST 10–7
Q3	3:54	OHST	Sander 1-yard run (Van Raaphorst kick)	OHST 17–7
Q4	11:28	ILL	Russell 2-yard pass from Taliaferro (run failed)	OHST 17–13
Q4	7:22	ILL	Warren 5-yard run (Plankenhorn kick)	ILL 20–17
Q4	1:53	OHST	Van Raaphorst 49-yard field goal	Tie 20–20

=== USC ===
Team	1	2	3	4	Total
Ohio State	3	0	0	0	3
• USC	2	10	13	7	32

- Date: October 19
- Location: Memorial Coliseum, Los Angeles
- Game attendance: 61,883
- Game weather: Cloudy, cool

Scoring summary
Q1	6:25	OSU	Van Raaphorst 44 yard field goal	OSU 0–3
Q1	3:29	USC	Warfield tackled in end zone	OSU 2–3
Q2	7:59	USC	Brown 49 yard run (Brownell kick)	USC 9–3
Q2	0:41	USC	Brownell 13 yard field goal	USC 12–3
Q3	8:01	USC	Beathard 1 yard run (Brownell kick)	USC 19–3
Q3	5:30	USC	Beathard 33 yard pass to Thomas (kick failed)	USC 25–3
Q4	4:07	USC	Lupo 40 yard interception return (Brownell kick)	USC 32–3

=== Wisconsin ===
Team	1	2	3	4	Total
• Ohio St	3	3	0	7	13
Wisconsin	3	0	7	0	10

- Date: October 26
- Location: Camp Randall Stadium, Madison, WI
- Game attendance: 65,319
- Game weather: Sunny; 77 °F (25 °C); wind 14 mph SW

Scoring summary
Q1	10:07	OHST	Van Raaphorst 26-yard field goal	OHST 3–0
Q1	2:37	WIS	Froenk 25-yard field goal	Tie 3–3
Q2	:06	OHST	Van Raaphorst 45-yard field goal	OHST 6–3
Q3	4:22	WIS	Silvestri 12-yard run (Froenk kick)	WIS 10–6
Q4	2:13	OHST	Snell 2-yard run (Van Raaphorst kick)	OHST 13–10

=== Iowa ===
Team	1	2	3	4	Total
Iowa	0	0	3	0	3
• Ohio St	0	0	7	0	7

- Date: November 2
- Location: Ohio Stadium, Columbus, OH
- Game attendance: 83,163
- Game weather: Cloudy; 44 °F (7 °C); wind 25 mph–35 WNW

Scoring summary
Q3	10:08	IOWA	Roberts 34-yard field goal	IOWA 3–0
Q3	:47	OHST	Snell 3-yard run (Van Raaphorst kick)	OHST 7–3

=== Penn State ===
Team	1	2	3	4	Total
• Penn State	0	0	10	0	10
Ohio State	0	7	0	0	7

- Date: November 9
- Location: Ohio Stadium
- Game attendance: 83,519
- Game weather: Clear, wind SW 3 mph, 59 °F (15 °C)

Scoring summary
Q2	3:23	OSU	Warfield 5 yard run (Van Raaphorst kick)	OSU 7–0
Q3	9:25	PSU	Liske 13 yard pass to Bowes (Coates kick)	TIED 7–7
Q3	3:09	PSU	Coates 23 yard field goal	PSU 7–14

=== Northwestern ===
Team	1	2	3	4	Total
• Northwestern	0	10	0	7	17
Ohio State	0	0	0	8	8

- Date: November 16
- Location: Ohio Stadium
- Game attendance: 83,988
- Game weather: Cloudy, 49 °F (9 °C)

Scoring summary
Q2	8:59	NW	Stamison 23 yard field goal	NW 0–3
Q2	2:08	NW	Murphy 16 yard run (Stamison kick)	NW 0–10
Q4	8:32	NW	Murphy 8 yard run (Stamison kick)	NW 0–17
Q4	0:20	OSU	Unverferth 31 yard pass to Warfield (Unverferth to Barnett pass)	NW 8-17

=== Michigan ===
Team	1	2	3	4	Total
• Ohio St	0	7	0	7	14
Michigan	3	7	0	0	10

- Date: November 30
- Location: Michigan Stadium, Ann Arbor, MI
- Game attendance: 36,424
- Game weather: Flurries

Scoring summary
Q1	11:23	MICH	Timberlake 28-yard field goal	MICH 3–0
Q2	8:00	MICH	Rindfuss 2-yard run (Timberlake kick)	MICH 10–0
Q2	:41	OHST	Warfield 35-yard pass from Unverferth (Van Raaphorst kick)	MICH 10–7
Q4	7:20	OHST	Unverferth 5-yard run (Van Raaphorst kick)	OHST 14–10

== Coaching staff ==
- Woody Hayes - Head Coach - 13th year
- Lyal Clark
- Glenn Ellison
- Frank Ellwood
- Hugh Hindman
- Lou McCullough
- Harry Strobel
- Max Urick

== Draft picks ==
Rnd.	Pick	Team	Player	Pos.	College	Notes
1	11	Cleveland Browns	Paul Warfield^{‡}^{†}	WR	Ohio St	4th round pick in 1964 AFL Draft by the Buffalo Bills
4	49	New York Giants	Matt Snell ^{†}	FB	Ohio St	1st round pick in 1964 AFL Draft by the New York Jets
10	138	Cleveland Browns	Dick Van Raaphorst	K	Ohio St	
14	191	Pittsburgh Steelers	Tom Jenkins	G	Ohio St	

Notes

† Pro Bowl Selection
‡ Member of the NFL Hall of Fame
