= 1963 Northwestern Wildcats football team =

American college football season

1963 Northwestern Wildcats football
- Conference: Big Ten Conference
- Record: 5–4 (3–4 Big Ten)
- Head coach: Ara Parseghian (8th season)
- MVP: Bill Swingle
- Captains: Chuck Logan; Kent Pike
- Home stadium: Dyche Stadium

1963 Big Ten Conference football standings
	Conf.					Overall
Team	W		L		T	W		L		T
No. 3 Illinois $	5	–	1	–	1	8	–	1	–	1
No. 9 Michigan State	4	–	1	–	1	6	–	2	–	1
Ohio State	4	–	1	–	1	5	–	3	–	1
Purdue	4	–	3	–	0	5	–	4	–	0
Northwestern	3	–	4	–	0	5	–	4	–	0
Wisconsin	3	–	4	–	0	5	–	4	–	0
Michigan	2	–	3	–	2	3	–	4	–	2
Iowa	2	–	3	–	1	3	–	3	–	2
Minnesota	2	–	5	–	0	3	–	6	–	0
Indiana	1	–	5	–	0	3	–	6	–	0
$ – Conference champion; Rankings from AP Poll

The 1963 Northwestern Wildcats team was an American football team that represented Northwestern University during the 1963 Big Ten Conference football season. In their eighth year under head coach Ara Parseghian, the Wildcats compiled a 5–4 record (3–4 against conference opponents) and finished in a tie for fifth place in the Big Ten Conference.

The team's offensive leaders were quarterback Tom Myers with 1,398 passing yards, Willie Stinson with 368 rushing yards, and Gary Crum with 417 receiving yards.

== Schedule ==
Date	Opponent	Rank	Site	Result	Attendance	Source
September 21	at Missouri*	No. 6	Memorial Stadium; Columbia, MO	W 23–12	45,000	
September 28	Indiana	No. 7	Dyche Stadium; Evanston, IL	W 34–21	40,868	
October 5	at Illinois	No. 4	Memorial Stadium; Champaign, IL (rivalry)	L 9–10	51,286	
October 12	Minnesota		Dyche Stadium; Evanston, IL	W 15–8	45,763	
October 19	Miami (OH)*	No. 10	Dyche Stadium; Evanston, IL	W 37–6	43,333	
October 26	Michigan State	No. 9	Dyche Stadium; Evanston, IL	L 7–15	51,013	
November 2	at Michigan		Michigan Stadium; Ann Arbor, MI (rivalry)	L 6–27	51,088	
November 9	at Wisconsin		Camp Randall Stadium; Madison WI	L 14–17	65,388	
November 16	at Ohio State		Ohio Stadium; Columbus, OH	W 17–8	83,988	
*Non-conference game; Rankings from AP Poll released prior to the game; Source:
