= Tom Alward =

American football player (born 1952)

No. 67
- Position: Guard

Personal information
- Born: October 13, 1952 (age 74); Flint, Michigan, U.S.
- Listed height: 6 ft 4 in (1.93 m)
- Listed weight: 255 lb (116 kg)

Career information
- High school: Bendle
- College: Nebraska
- NFL draft: 1975: 6th round, 153rd overall pick

Career history
- Tampa Bay Buccaneers (1976)

Awards and highlights
- Second-team All-Big Eight (1974)

Career NFL statistics
- Games played: 14
- Games started: 9
- Stats at Pro Football Reference

Thomas Lavern Alward (born October 13, 1952) was a National Football League (NFL) offensive guard who played in 1976 for the Tampa Bay Buccaneers. He attended high school at Bendle High School, college at the University of Nebraska–Lincoln and was selected 153rd overall by the New York Jets in the sixth round of the 1975 NFL draft.

He is currently head football coach at Goodrich High School in Goodrich, Michigan.
