= 1963 Purdue Boilermakers football team =

American college football season

1963 Purdue Boilermakers football
- Conference: Big Ten Conference
- Record: 5–4 (4–3 Big Ten)
- Head coach: Jack Mollenkopf (8th season)
- MVP: Ron DiGravio
- Captains: Henry Dudgeon; Bob Lake
- Home stadium: Ross–Ade Stadium

1963 Big Ten Conference football standings
	Conf.					Overall
Team	W		L		T	W		L		T
No. 3 Illinois $	5	–	1	–	1	8	–	1	–	1
No. 9 Michigan State	4	–	1	–	1	6	–	2	–	1
Ohio State	4	–	1	–	1	5	–	3	–	1
Purdue	4	–	3	–	0	5	–	4	–	0
Northwestern	3	–	4	–	0	5	–	4	–	0
Wisconsin	3	–	4	–	0	5	–	4	–	0
Michigan	2	–	3	–	2	3	–	4	–	2
Iowa	2	–	3	–	1	3	–	3	–	2
Minnesota	2	–	5	–	0	3	–	6	–	0
Indiana	1	–	5	–	0	3	–	6	–	0
$ – Conference champion; Rankings from AP Poll

The 1963 Purdue Boilermakers football team was an American football team that represented Purdue University during the 1963 Big Ten Conference football season. In their eighth season under head coach Jack Mollenkopf, the Boilermakers compiled a 5–4 record, finished in fourth place in the Big Ten Conference with a 4–3 record against conference opponents, and were outscored by their opponents by a combined total of 149 to 119.

Notable players from the 1963 Purdue football team included quarterback Ron DiGravio and end Bob Hadrick.

== Schedule ==
Date	Opponent	Site	Result	Attendance	Source
September 28	at Miami (FL)*	Miami Orange Bowl; Miami, FL	L 0–3	46,823	
October 5	Notre Dame*	Ross–Ade Stadium; West Lafayette, IN (rivalry)	W 7–6	51,723	
October 12	at No. 5 Wisconsin	Camp Randall Stadium; Madison, WI	L 20–38	61,415	
October 19	at Michigan	Michigan Stadium; Ann Arbor, MI	W 23–12	45,557	
October 26	Iowa^{†}	Ross–Ade Stadium; West Lafayette, IN	W 14–0	47,921	
November 2	at No. 2 Illinois	Memorial Stadium; Champaign, IL (rivalry)	L 21–41	61,796	
November 9	No. 9 Michigan State	Ross–Ade Stadium; West Lafayette, IN	L 0–23	45,137	
November 16	Minnesota	Ross–Ade Stadium; West Lafayette, IN	W 13–11	38,924	
November 30	at Indiana	Seventeenth Street Stadium; Bloomington, IN (Old Oaken Bucket)	W 21–15	33,987	
*Non-conference game; ^{†}Homecoming; Rankings from AP Poll released prior to the game; Source:

== Roster ==
- Don Brooks, WR
- Sal Ciampi, OL
- Richard E. Dauch, RB
- Ron DiGravio, QB
- Gene Donaldson, RB
- Henry Dudgeon, OL
- Ken Eby, QB
- Dave Ellison, WR
- Wally Florence, OL
- Clarence Foster, RB
- Tom Fugate, RB
- Jim Garcia, OL
- Bob Hadrick, WR
- Jim Hales, OL
- Gary Hogan, QB
- Doug Holcomb, QB
- Bob Hopp, OL
- Larry Kaminski, OL
- John Kuzniewski, RB
- Bob Lake, OL
- Terry Marcoline, RB
- Randy Minniear, RB
- Jim Morel, RB
- Russ Pfahler, RB
- Bill Roach, WR
- Jerry Shay, OL
- Bob Smith, WR
- Gordon Teter, RB
- Harold Wells, OL
- Len Zdanowicz, RB
- Joe Sprock, RB
