= 1963 Indiana Hoosiers football team =

American college football season

1963 Indiana Hoosiers football
- Conference: Big Ten Conference
- Record: 3–6 (1–5 Big Ten)
- Head coach: Phil Dickens (6th season)
- MVP: Tom Nowatzke
- Captain: Dick Wervey
- Home stadium: Seventeenth Street Stadium

1963 Big Ten Conference football standings
	Conf.					Overall
Team	W		L		T	W		L		T
No. 3 Illinois $	5	–	1	–	1	8	–	1	–	1
No. 9 Michigan State	4	–	1	–	1	6	–	2	–	1
Ohio State	4	–	1	–	1	5	–	3	–	1
Purdue	4	–	3	–	0	5	–	4	–	0
Northwestern	3	–	4	–	0	5	–	4	–	0
Wisconsin	3	–	4	–	0	5	–	4	–	0
Michigan	2	–	3	–	2	3	–	4	–	2
Iowa	2	–	3	–	1	3	–	3	–	2
Minnesota	2	–	5	–	0	3	–	6	–	0
Indiana	1	–	5	–	0	3	–	6	–	0
$ – Conference champion; Rankings from AP Poll

The 1963 Indiana Hoosiers football team represented the Indiana Hoosiers in the 1963 Big Ten Conference football season. They participated as members of the Big Ten Conference. The Hoosiers played their home games at Seventeenth Street Stadium in Bloomington, Indiana. The team was coached by Phil Dickens, in his sixth year as head coach of the Hoosiers.

== Schedule ==
Date	Opponent	Site	Result	Attendance	Source
September 28	at No. 7 Northwestern	Dyche Stadium; Evanston, IL	L 21–34	40,868	
October 5	Ohio State	Seventeenth Street Stadium; Bloomington, IN	L 0–21	42,296	
October 12	at Iowa	Iowa Stadium; Iowa City, IA	L 26–37	56,800	
October 19	at Michigan State	Spartan Stadium; East Lansing, MI (rivalry)	L 3–20	52,297	
October 26	Cincinnati*	Seventeenth Street Stadium; Bloomington, IN	W 20–6	34,583	
November 2	at Minnesota	Memorial Stadium; Minneapolis, MN	W 24–6	51,657	
November 9	Oregon State*^{†}	Seventeenth Street Stadium; Bloomington, IN	W 20–15	25,895	
November 16	at Oregon*	Multnomah Stadium; Portland, OR	L 22–28	19,051	
November 30	Purdue	Seventeenth Street Stadium; Bloomington, IN (Old Oaken Bucket)	L 15–21	33,987	
*Non-conference game; ^{†}Homecoming; Rankings from AP Poll released prior to the game; Source:

== 1964 NFL draftees ==
Player	Position	Round	Pick	NFL club
Marv Woodson	Defensive end	1	8	Baltimore Colts
