= Chuck Logan (American football) =

American football player (born 1943)

No. 82, 83
- Position: Tight end

Personal information
- Born: April 10, 1943 (age 83); Chicago, Illinois, U.S.
- Listed height: 6 ft 4 in (1.93 m)
- Listed weight: 210 lb (95 kg)

Career information
- High school: Lane Tech (Chicago)
- College: Northwestern (1960-1963)
- NFL draft: 1964: 7th round, 98th overall pick
- AFL draft: 1964: 15th round, 113th overall pick

Career history
- Chicago Bears (1964)*; Pittsburgh Steelers (1964); St. Louis Cardinals (1965–1968); Minnesota Vikings (1969)
- * Offseason or practice squad member only

Awards and highlights
- First-team All-Big Ten (1963)

Career NFL statistics
- Receptions: 1
- Receiving yards: 7
- Stats at Pro Football Reference

Charles Russell Logan (born April 10, 1943) is an American former professional football player who was a tight end in the National Football League (NFL). He played four seasons for the Pittsburgh Steelers and the St. Louis Cardinals. He played college football for the Northwestern Wildcats.
