= Todd Gabbett =

American football player and coach (1942–2021)

Biographical details
- Born: September 13, 1942; Peoria, Illinois, U.S.
- Died: January 14, 2021 (aged 78); Ruskin, Florida, U.S.

Playing career
- 1960–1963: Illinois
- 1966: Virginia Sailors
- Positions: Offensive guard, offensive tackle

Coaching career (HC unless noted)
- 1969–1970: Catholic University

Head coaching record
- Overall: 5–7–1

William Todd Gabbett (September 13, 1942 – January 14, 2021) was an American football player and coach. He served as the head football coach at Catholic University in Washington, D.C., from 1969 to 1970, compiling a record of 5–7–1. Gabbett played college football at the University of Illinois.
