= Bendle High School =

Location
- 2283 East Scottwood Avenue; Burton, Michigan 48529; United States; 42°58′14″N 83°39′37″W

Information
- Type: Public secondary school
- Established: 1953
- School district: Bendle Public Schools
- Superintendent: Tom Meszaros
- Principal: Brandon Chapman
- Teaching staff: 19.40 (on an FTE basis)
- Grades: 9-12
- Enrollment: 322 (2023-2024)
- Student to teacher ratio: 16.60
- Colors: Blue and gold
- Athletics conference: Genesee Area Conference
- Nickname: Tigers
- Accreditation: Cognia
- Website: bhs.bendleschools.org

Bendle High School is a public high school in Burton, Michigan, United States. It serves grades 9-12 for the Bendle Public Schools.

== History ==
In 1928 in the southern portion of what was then Burton Township, the first Bendle School, which served kindergarten to 12th grade, opened. It continued to serve the students of the area until the township's population growth after World War II resulted in overcrowding. As a result, several new school buildings were built, including Bendle's first elementary school and, in 1953, a new high school building, located on 2294 East Bristol Road; the 1928 high school became T.N. Lamb Junior High School. After the turn of the 21st century, T.N. Lamb was overcrowded again, and the 1953 Bendle High School was in its sixth decade as a high school. The overcrowding of T.N. Lamb Junior High plus Bendle High School's age led to the third high school, the present Bendle High School, being built in 2008 on its current location on 2283 East Scottwood Avenue in Burton, and the conversion of the 1953 high school into the present Bendle Middle School. T.N. Lamb Junior High School was demolished in 2011.

The current Bendle High School cost $15.5 million to build and contains 80,000 square feet of space.

== Academics ==
Bendle High School has been accredited by Cognia, or its predecessor, North Central Association, since 2004. In the 2020 U.S. News & World Report annual survey of high schools, Bendle ranked 467th in Michigan and 13,345th nationally.

== Demographics ==
The demographic breakdown of the 358 students enrolled for the 2018–19 school year was:

- Male - 50.6%
- Female - 49.4%
- Native American/Alaskan - 0.3%
- Black - 12.8%
- Hispanic - 7.0%
- Native Hawaiian/Pacific islanders - 0.3%
- White - 74.0%
- Multiracial - 5 6%

96.6% of the students were eligible for free or reduced-cost lunch. For 2018–19, Bendle was a Title I school.

== Athletics ==
Bendle's Tigers compete in the Genesee Area Conference. School colors are blue and gold. The following Michigan High School Athletic Association (MHSAA) sanctioned sports are offered:

- Baseball (boys)
- Basketball (girls and boys)
- Bowling (girls and boys)
- Cross country (girls and boys)
- Football (boys)
- Softball (girls)
- Track and field (girls and boys)
- Volleyball (girls)
- Wrestling (boys)

== Notable alumni ==
- Paul Krause – NFL defensive back
