= Ken Bowman =

American football player (1942–2023)

- Bowman in 1967

No. 57
- Position: Center

Personal information
- Born: December 15, 1942; Milan, Illinois, U.S.
- Died: December 27, 2023 (aged 81); Oro Valley, Arizona, U.S.
- Listed height: 6 ft 3 in (1.91 m)
- Listed weight: 230 lb (104 kg)

Career information
- High school: Rock Island (Rock Island, Illinois)
- College: Wisconsin
- NFL draft: 1964: 8th round, 111th overall pick
- AFL draft: 1964: 10th round, 75th overall pick

Career history
- Green Bay Packers (1964–1973); The Hawaiians (1975)

Awards and highlights
- 2× Super Bowl champion (I, II); 3× NFL champion (1965, 1966, 1967); Green Bay Packers Hall of Fame; Second-team All-Big Ten (1963)

Career NFL statistics
- Games played: 123
- Games started: 107
- Fumble recoveries: 3
- Stats at Pro Football Reference

Kenneth Brian Bowman (December 15, 1942 – December 27, 2023) was an American professional football player who played 10 seasons as a center for the Green Bay Packers of the National Football League (NFL) from 1964 to 1973. Bowman was inducted into the Green Bay Packers Hall of Fame.

== Early life ==
Ken Bowman was born on December 15, 1942, in Milan, Illinois. He graduated from Rock Island High School before attending the University of Wisconsin-Madison where he played college football for the Wisconsin Badgers. During his junior year in 1962, the Badgers were Big Ten Conference champions and played USC in the Rose Bowl.

== Professional career ==
The Green Bay Packers selected Bowman in the eighth round of the 1964 NFL draft. He succeeded Hall of Famer Jim Ringo at center for the Packers as a rookie in 1964. In his fourth NFL season in 1967, Bowman was the center during the winning play of the Ice Bowl, in which Bart Starr scored the winning touchdown on a quarterback sneak in the game's final seconds to win a third consecutive NFL title. On that play, Bowman and Jerry Kramer executed a wedge block on Jethro Pugh to clear a path into for Starr.

After his rookie season, Bowman attended law school part-time and earned a Juris Doctor from the University of Wisconsin Law School in 1972. During the 1974 players' strike, Bowman was the NFL players' union representative for the Packers, and was picketing the first preseason scrimmage against the Chicago Bears at Lambeau Field in late July. Along with a number of teammates, he was arrested, and was placed on injured reserve with a phantom back injury and sat out the 1974 season. Bowman ended his 11-year professional career in 1975 in Honolulu with The Hawaiians of the struggling World Football League, which folded on October 22.

Bowman was inducted into the Green Bay Packers Hall of Fame in 1981.

== After football ==
Bowman was one of the fifteen plaintiffs in Mackey v. National Football League in which Judge Earl R. Larson declared that the Rozelle rule was a violation of antitrust laws on December 30, 1975. Bowman returned to Wisconsin in 1975 and practiced law. He and his wife moved to Arizona in 1994 and in semi-retirement he served as a special magistrate for the City of Tucson, Town of Oro Valley, and Town of Marana. He also served on the Board of Regents of Concordia University Wisconsin.

Bowman died at home in Oro Valley, Arizona, on December 27, 2023, at age 81.
