= Joe Wolfe =

Australian physicist and composer (born 1952)

Joe Wolfe AM
- Born: 25 February 1952 (age 74); Brisbane, Australia
- Education: Physics
- Alma mater: University of Queensland, Australian National University
- Occupation: Professor
- Employer: University of New South Wales Sydney
- Known for: Music Science, Biophysics, composer

Joe Wolfe (born 1952 in Brisbane) is an Australian physicist, composer and professor at University of New South Wales Sydney.

== Life ==
Wolfe grew up in Queensland (Australia). He graduated in physics from the University of Queensland in 1974 and with a PhD from the Australian National University in 1979. He worked as a postdoctoral fellow at Cornell University, the (Australian) Commonwealth Scientific and Industrial Research Organisation (CSIRO) and the Australian National University. In 1982 he was appointed lecturer at UNSW Sydney, where he is now a professor. He collaborates regularly with researchers in France and was an invited professor at the École Normale Supérieure in Paris in 1993.

== Scientific research and teaching ==
His early research was in cellular biophysics, primarily initially studying the physical injuries in cells at low temperature and at low hydration. Around the turn of the century, with colleague John Smith, he set up a research group in acoustics, concentrating on the physics of the voice and music acoustics. As well as classroom teaching, Wolfe has produced multimedia internet resources, which have won a number of international awards. Music Acoustics is a large site that provides much introductory material about the voice and musical instruments, as well as popular versions of the Wolfe lab's research. Einsteinlight was made for the centenary of Special Relativity. Physclips is a large set of multimedia resources in introductory physics, and Particles to Planets is a MOOC on Coursera.

== Music composition ==
Wolfe has composed music for symphony orchestra and chamber ensembles, including a trumpet concerto and a quartet for flute, saxophone, bassoon and cello.

== Prizes and awards ==
- Goldacre medal for distinguished research, Australian Society for Plant Physiology, (shared) 1984.
- France-Australia Science Fellowship, 1988.
- Invited Professor, École Normale Supérieure, Paris, 1993.
- UNSW Vice-Chancellor's Award for Teaching Excellence, 2002.
- The Acoustical Society of America: Science Writing Award for Professionals in Acoustics, 2002.
- Australian Acoustical Society-CSR Bradford: inaugural Award for Excellence in Acoustics, 2003 (awarded to the laboratory team).
- Australian Award for University Teaching, Physical Sciences and Engineering section, 2004.
- Société Française d'Acoustique: Médaille étrangère, 2004.
- Multimedia Educational Resources for Learning & Online Teaching. Main and discipline prizes, 2005.
- Scientific American Science and Technology Web Awards, 2005. Awards for sites on relativity and on acoustics.
- Australian College of Educators: New South Wales award for university teaching, 2006.
- Pirelli Internetional Award for Science Communication (Physics), 2008 (Wolfe and Hatsidimitris).
- Artemis Orchestra First Prize (for a robot to play a musical instrument), 2008 (Team member).
- Australian Acoustical Society-CSR Bradford: Award for Excellence in Acoustics, 2010 (awarded to the laboratory team).
- Australian Institute of Physics: Medal for Excellence in Education, 2010.
- The Australian Innovation Award (Education section). Team leader. 2011.
- UNSW Faculty of Science: Award for Excellence in Teaching and Research. 2011.
- The Rossing Award for Education, the Acoustical Society of America. 2012.
- The Australian Institute of Physics (NSW) award for outreach. 2016.
- Member of the Order of Australia - For significant service to tertiary education, and to music. 2025.
