= 1963 All-America college football team =

Official list of the best college football players of 1963

The 1963 All-America college football team is composed of college football players who were selected as All-Americans by various organizations and writers that chose All-America college football teams in 1963. The seven selectors recognized by the NCAA as "official" for the 1963 season are (1) the American Football Coaches Association (AFCA), (2) the Associated Press (AP), (3) the Central Press Association (CP), (4) the Football Writers Association of America (FWAA), (5) the Newspaper Enterprise Association (NEA), (6) the Sporting News, and (7) the United Press International (UPI).

== Consensus All-Americans ==
For the year 1963, the NCAA recognizes seven published All-American teams as "official" designations for purposes of its consensus determinations. Four players were unanimously chosen as first-team All-Americans by all seven official selectors. They were: (1) Navy quarterback Roger Staubach, who was awarded the 1963 Heisman Trophy; (2) Illinois center/linebacker Dick Butkus, won the 1963 Chicago Tribune Silver Football as the Big Ten Conference's Most Valuable Player; (3) tackle Scott Appleton who won the Outland Trophy and led the 1963 Texas Longhorns football team to a national championship; and (4) Nebraska guard Bob "The Boomer" Brown, who was the second player chosen in the 1964 NFL draft. Staubach, Butkus and Brown were each subsequently inducted into both the College and Pro Football Hall of Fames. The consensus All-American team also included College and Pro Football Hall of Fame inductees Gale Sayers (running back, Kansas) and Carl Eller (tackle, Minnesota).

The following chart identifies the NCAA-recognized consensus All-Americans and displays which first-team designations they received.

Name	Position	School	Number	Official	Other
Scott Appleton	Tackle	Texas	7/7	AFCA, AP, CP, FWAA, NEA, SN, UPI	FN, Time, WC
Bob Brown	Guard	Nebraska	7/7	AFCA, AP, CP, FWAA, NEA, SN, UPI	FN, Time, WC
Dick Butkus	Center	Illinois	7/7	AFCA, AP, CP, FWAA, NEA, SN, UPI	FN, Time, WC
Roger Staubach	Quarterback	Navy	7/7	AFCA, AP, CP, FWAA, NEA, SN, UPI	FN, Time, WC
Rick Redman	Guard	Washington	6/7	AFCA, CP, FWAA, NEA, SN, UPI	FN, WC
Carl Eller	Tackle	Minnesota	5/7	AFCA, AP, CP, FWAA, UPI	FN, Time, WC
Gale Sayers	Halfback	Kansas	5/7	AFCA, FWAA, NEA, SN, UPI	FN, WC
Vern Burke	End	Oregon State	4/7	AFCA, CP, FWAA, UPI	FN, WC
Larry Elkins	End	Baylor	3/7	CP, NEA, SN	FN, WC
Sherman Lewis	Halfback	Michigan State	3/7	AP, CP, UPI	FN, WC
Jim Grisham	Fullback	Oklahoma	3/7	CP, NEA, SN	FN
Paul Martha	Back-Safety	Pittsburgh	3/7	CP, NEA, SN	FN

== Offense ==
=== Ends ===
- Vern Burke, Oregon State (AFCA-1, FWAA, NEA-2, UPI-1, CP, FN, WC)
- Larry Elkins, Baylor (NEA-1, SN, CP, UPI-2, FN, WC)
- Bob Lacey, North Carolina (AP-1, FWAA, NEA-2, FN)
- Billy Martin, Georgia Tech (Time, NEA-1, SN, UPI-2, FN)
- Jim Kelly, Notre Dame (AFCA-1, UPI-1)
- Dave Parks, Texas Tech (AP-1, SN)
- Charles Brooks, Memphis State (FN)
- Billy Truax, LSU (FN)
- Hal Bedsole, USC (Time)
- Mel Profit, UCLA (AFCA-2, AP-2, NEA-3, UPI-3)
- John Simmons, Tulsa (AFCA-2, UPI-3)
- Don Montgomery, North Carolina St. (AP-2)
- Allen Brown, Ole Miss (NEA-3)

=== Tackles ===
- Scott Appleton, Texas (AFCA-1, AP-1, FWAA, NEA-1, SN, UPI-1, CP, WC, FN, Time)
- Carl Eller, Minnesota (AFCA-1, AP-1, FWAA, NEA-3, UPI-1, CP, WC, FN, Time)
- Ernie Borghetti, Pittsburgh (AP-2, FWAA, NEA-3, FN)
- Harry Schuh, Memphis State (NEA-1)
- Ken Kortas, Louisville (FWAA)
- Whaley Hall, Ole Miss (AFCA-2, UPI-2)
- Ralph Neely, Oklahoma (AFCA-2, AP-2, UPI-2, FN)
- Archie Sutton, Illinois (NEA-2, UPI-3)
- Jim Freeman, Navy (NEA-2, FN)
- Al Hillebrand, Stanford (FN)

=== Guards ===
- Bob Brown, Nebraska (AFCA-1, AP-1, FWAA, NEA-1, SN, UPI-1, CP, WC, FN, Time)
- Rick Redman, Washington (AFCA-1, FWAA, NEA-1, SN, UPI-1, CP, FN, WC)
- Herschel Turner, Kentucky (SN, UPI-3 [tackle], Time)
- Damon Bame, USC (AP-1, NEA-3, UPI-2)
- Steve DeLong, Tennessee (AFCA-2, FWAA, UPI-3, FN)
- Mike Reilly, Iowa (AP-2, FWAA)
- Dick Nowak, Army (AFCA-2, UPI-2, FN)
- Bob Lehman, Notre Dame (AP-2)
- Ed Adamchik, Pittsburgh (NEA-2)
- Bill Budness, Boston Univ. (NEA-2)
- Don Croftcheck, Indiana (NEA-3)
- Earl Lattimer, Michigan State (UPI-3, FN)
- Robbie Hucklebridge, LSU (FN)

=== Centers ===
- Dick Butkus, Illinois (AFCA-1, AP-1, FWAA, NEA-1, SN, UPI-1, CP, WC, FN, Time)
- Kenny Dill, Mississippi (AP-2, FWAA, FN)
- Ronnie Caveness, Arkansas (FN)
- Malcolm Walker, Rice (NEA-2, UPI-3)
- Ray Kubala, Texas A&M (AFCA-2)
- Pat Watson, Mississippi State (UPI-2)
- Orville Hudson, East Texas St. (NEA-3)

=== Quarterbacks ===
- Roger Staubach, Navy (AFCA-1, AP-1, FWAA, NEA-1, SN, UPI-1, CP, WC, FN, Time)
- Billy Lothridge, Georgia Tech (AP-1, FWAA, UPI-2, FN [halfback])
- Don Trull, Baylor (AFCA-2, AP-2, FWAA, NEA-2, UPI-2, FN)
- George Mira, Miami (AP-2)
- Gary Wood, Cornell (NEA-2)
- Bob Schweickert, Virginia Tech, (AP-3)

=== Backs ===
- Sherman Lewis, Michigan State (AP-1, CP, NEA-3, UPI-1, FN, WC)
- Paul Martha, Pittsburgh (AFCA-2, CP, NEA-1, SN, UPI-2, FN)
- Gale Sayers, Kansas (AFCA-1, AP-2, FWAA, NEA-1, SN, UPI-1, FN, WC)
- Jay Wilkinson, Duke (AFCA-1, AP-2, FWAA, NEA-3, UPI-1, FN)
- Jimmy Sidle, Auburn (AP-1, FWAA, NEA-3 [qb], UPI-3, FN [qb])
- Mel Renfro, Oregon (AFCA-2, NEA-2, UPI-3, Time)
- Paul Warfield, Ohio State (Time)
- Tommy Ford, Texas (FWAA, FN)
- Tom Vaughn, Iowa State (AFCA-2, FWAA)
- Benny Nelson, Alabama (NEA-2)
- Cosmo Iacavazzi, Princeton (NEA-3, UPI-3)

=== Fullback ===
- Jim Grisham, Oklahoma (CP, NEA-1, SN, UPI-2, FN)
- Tommy Crutcher, TCU (AFCA-1, UPI-3)
- Tom Nowatzke, Indiana (FN)
- Tony Lorick, Arizona State (FN)

== Key ==
- **Bold** – Consensus All-American
- -1 – First-team selection
- -2 – Second-team selection
- -3 – Third-team selection

=== Official selectors ===
- AFCA = American Football Coaches Association
- AP = Associated Press
- CP = Central Press Association
- FWAA = Football Writers Association of America
- NEA = Newspaper Enterprise Association
- SN = Sporting News
- UPI = United Press International

=== Other selectors ===
- FN = The Football News, consisting of 33 selected by The Football News selection panel
- Time = Time, the U.S. news magazine
- WC = Walter Camp Football Foundation

== See also ==
- 1963 All-Atlantic Coast Conference football team
- 1963 All-Big Eight Conference football team
- 1963 All-Big Ten Conference football team
- 1963 All-Pacific Coast football team
- 1963 All-SEC football team
- 1963 All-Southwest Conference football team
