= Joe O'Donnell (American football) =

American football player (1941–2019)

No. 67
- Positions: Guard, Tackle

Personal information
- Born: August 31, 1941; Ann Arbor, Michigan, U.S.
- Died: January 17, 2020 (aged 78); Oregon, U.S.
- Listed height: 6 ft 2 in (1.88 m)
- Listed weight: 262 lb (119 kg)

Career information
- High school: Milan
- College: Michigan (1959-1960; 1962-1963)
- NFL draft: 1964: 3rd round, 40th overall pick
- AFL draft: 1964: 13th round, 101st overall pick

Career history
- Buffalo Bills (1964-1971); St. Louis Cardinals (1972)*; Birmingham Americans (1974); Birmingham Vulcans (1975)
- * Offseason or practice squad member only

Awards and highlights
- 2× AFL champion (1964, 1965); AFL All-Star (1965); First-team All-Big Ten (1963)

Career NFL/AFL statistics
- Games played: 91
- Games started: 63
- Fumble recoveries: 3
- Stats at Pro Football Reference

Joseph Raymond O'Donnell (August 31, 1941 – January 17, 2019) was an American football player. He played college football as a fullback, guard and tackle for the University of Michigan from 1960 to 1963. He also played professional football as a guard and tackle for eight seasons for the Buffalo Bills in the American Football League (AFL) and the National Football League (NFL). He was a part of the 1964 and 1965 AFL Championship teams. O'Donnell was an AFL Eastern Division All-Star in 1965. He also came out of retirement to play in the World Football League (WFL) in 1974 and 1975.

== Early life ==
O'Donnell was born in 1941 in Ann Arbor, Michigan, and attended Milan High School in nearby Milan. He was a standout athlete in football, basketball and track. He was an all-state running back in 1958, scoring six touchdowns in a game and 24 in an eight-game season. He also set a Milan school record in basketball with 49 points in a game.

== University of Michigan ==
O'Donnell enrolled at the University of Michigan in 1959. He played for the freshman football team in 1959 as a fullback and retained that position on Michigan's varsity football team in 1960. For the 1961 season, he was moved to the guard position, but broke his arm in the first game against UCLA and sat out the remainder of the season. He was granted an additional year of eligibility due to his missing the 1961 season. He was then moved to the tackle position in 1962 and had more playing time than any other Michigan player that year. At the end of the 1962 season, he was voted by his teammates to be the captain of the 1963 Michigan Wolverines football team.

In 1963, O'Donnell moved back to the guard position, and also served as the team's punter. He averaged 36.4 yards per kick on 48 punts during the 1963 season. In the 1963 season opener against SMU, he faked a punt and ran 50 yards for a touchdown. The fake punt was not a called play. O'Donnell said after the game that he saw one side of SMU's line collapse and took off. He also recovered two fumbles in a 1963 victory over Northwestern. At the end of the 1963 season, the Associated Press selected O'Donnell as a first-team player on its 1963 All-Big Ten Conference football team.

O'Donnell was also an outstanding student at Michigan. He was named to the Big Ten All-Academic teams in 1962 and 1963 and, in 1964, was named to the All-Time All-Academic Big Ten football team.

== Professional football ==
O'Donnell was drafted by the Green Bay Packers in the third round of the 1964 NFL draft and by the Buffalo Bills in the 13th round of the AFL draft (in that era, the AFL and NFL were separate leagues and held separate drafts). He chose to play for the Bills. O'Donnell played for the Bills, primarily as their right guard from 1964 through 1971. In 1964, he was selected to play in the AFL Pro Bowl.

He was traded to the St. Louis Cardinals prior to the 1972 season in exchange for guard Irv Goode. He chose to retire from pro football prior to the 1972 season and so never played with the Cardinals.

In 1974, he came out of retirement to play for the Birmingham Americans of the World Football League (WFL). He played for the WFL's Birmingham Vulcans in the 1975 season until the league collapsed.

== Post-retirement ==
After retiring from football, O'Donnell started and ran several businesses including a floor-covering business called "Yardage Distributors", and a butcher-shop/bakery called "The Butcher - The Baker". In 1978, he moved his family from their farm in Eden, New York back to Milan, Michigan. He was active in civic affairs in Milan serving on the school board for many years. In the 1980s he organized the annual "Great American Pig Roast" which was a successful fundraising event for the school district. He also served on the coaching staff at Milan High School for many years. In 2010, the high school football field in Milan was renamed "Joe O'Donnell Field" in recognition of his service to the community and the football program.

In the late 1980s O'Donnell provided the color commentary for the radio broadcasts of the University of Michigan football games on the Michigan Farm Radio Network.

O'Donnell was married to Caroline (Kerr) O'Donnell (deceased) and has three sons. He died from complications of Alzheimer's disease in 2019.
