= 1963 Minnesota Golden Gophers football team =

American college football season

1963 Minnesota Golden Gophers football
- Conference: Big Ten Conference
- Record: 3–6 (2–5 Big Ten)
- Head coach: Murray Warmath (10th season)
- MVP: Carl Eller
- Captain: Milt Sunde
- Home stadium: Memorial Stadium

1963 Big Ten Conference football standings
| | Conf. | | | | | Overall |
| Team | W | | L | | T | W | | L | | T |
|---|---|---|---|---|---|---|---|---|---|---|
| No. 3 Illinois $ | 5 | – | 1 | – | 1 | 8 | – | 1 | – | 1 |
| No. 9 Michigan State | 4 | – | 1 | – | 1 | 6 | – | 2 | – | 1 |
| Ohio State | 4 | – | 1 | – | 1 | 5 | – | 3 | – | 1 |
| Purdue | 4 | – | 3 | – | 0 | 5 | – | 4 | – | 0 |
| Northwestern | 3 | – | 4 | – | 0 | 5 | – | 4 | – | 0 |
| Wisconsin | 3 | – | 4 | – | 0 | 5 | – | 4 | – | 0 |
| Michigan | 2 | – | 3 | – | 2 | 3 | – | 4 | – | 2 |
| Iowa | 2 | – | 3 | – | 1 | 3 | – | 3 | – | 2 |
| Minnesota | 2 | – | 5 | – | 0 | 3 | – | 6 | – | 0 |
| Indiana | 1 | – | 5 | – | 0 | 3 | – | 6 | – | 0 |
$ – Conference champion; Rankings from AP Poll

The 1963 Minnesota Golden Gophers football team represented the University of Minnesota in the 1963 Big Ten Conference football season. In their tenth year under head coach Murray Warmath, the Golden Gophers compiled a 3–6 record and were outscored by their opponents by a combined total of 117 to 95.

Tackle Carl Eller received the team's Most Valuable Player award and was a consensus first-team All-American. Eller was also named All-Big Ten first team. Center Frank Marchiewski was named All-Big Ten second team. Offensive lineman Milt Sunde was named Academic All-Big Ten.

Total attendance at five home games was 286,797, an average of 57,759 per game. The largest crowd was against Michigan.

== Schedule ==
| Date | Opponent | Site | Result | Attendance | Source |
|---|---|---|---|---|---|
| September 28 | Nebraska* | Memorial Stadium; Minneapolis, MN | L 7–14 | 61,140 | |
| October 5 | Army* | Memorial Stadium; Minneapolis, MN | W 24–8 | 60,264 | |
| October 12 | at Northwestern | Dyche Stadium; Evanston, IL | L 8–15 | 45,763 | |
| October 19 | at No. 7 Illinois | Memorial Stadium; Champaign, IL | L 6–16 | 61,229 | |
| October 26 | Michigan^{†} | Memorial Stadium; Minneapolis, MN (Little Brown Jug) | W 6–0 | 62,107 | |
| November 2 | Indiana | Memorial Stadium; Minneapolis, MN | L 6–24 | 51,657 | |
| November 9 | at Iowa | Iowa Stadium; Iowa City, IA (rivalry) | L 13–27 | 59,300 | |
| November 16 | at Purdue | Ross–Ade Stadium; West Lafayette, IN | L 11–33 | 38,924 | |
| November 28 | Wisconsin | Memorial Stadium; Minneapolis, MN (rivalry) | W 14–0 | 55,271 | |
*Non-conference game; ^{†}Homecoming; Rankings from AP Poll released prior to the game

== Roster ==
- Carl Eller, Sr.
