= Sammy Price (American football) =

American football player (1943–2026)

No. 30
- Position: Running back

Personal information
- Born: October 1, 1943; Margaret, Alabama, U.S.
- Died: August 5, 2026 (aged 82); Waterville, Ohio, U.S.
- Listed height: 5 ft 11 in (1.80 m)
- Listed weight: 215 lb (98 kg)

Career information
- High school: Scott (Toledo, Ohio)
- College: Illinois (1962–1965)
- NFL draft: 1966: 16th round, 240th overall pick
- AFL draft: 1966: 11th round, 92nd overall pick

Career history
- Miami Dolphins (1966–1968)

Career AFL statistics
- Rushing yards: 313
- Rushing average: 3.8
- Receptions: 10
- Receiving yards: 70
- Total touchdowns: 2
- Stats at Pro Football Reference

Samuel Lee Price (October 1, 1943 – August 5, 2026) was an American professional football player who was a running back for the Miami Dolphins of the American Football League (AFL). He played college football for the Illinois Fighting Illini. He was selected with the first pick of the eleventh round of the AFL draft and played as a reserve running back and fullback from 1966 to 1968. Price died in Waterville, Ohio on August 5, 2026, at the age of 82.
