= Tom Myers (quarterback) =

American football player (1943–2024)

No. 18
- Position: Quarterback

Personal information
- Born: August 13, 1943; Piqua, Ohio, U.S.
- Died: September 3, 2024 (aged 81); Raleigh, North Carolina, U.S.
- Listed height: 6 ft 1 in (1.85 m)
- Listed weight: 188 lb (85 kg)

Career information
- High school: Troy (Troy, Ohio)
- College: Northwestern (1961-1964)
- NFL draft: 1965: 4th round, 46th overall pick
- AFL draft: 1965: 12th round, 89th overall pick

Career history
- Detroit Lions (1965–1966)

Awards and highlights
- Third-team All-American (1962); 2× Second-team All-Big Ten (1962, 1963)

Career NFL statistics
- TD–INT: 0–2
- Passing yards: 16
- Passer rating: 16.7
- Stats at Pro Football Reference

Thomas Welborn Myers (August 13, 1943 – September 3, 2024) was an American professional football player who was a quarterback for two seasons with the Detroit Lions of the National Football League (NFL). He played college football for the Northwestern Wildcats before being selected by Detroit in the fourth round of the 1965 NFL draft and the Denver Broncos in the 12th round of the 1965 AFL draft. He played for the Lions from 1965–1966.

== Early life ==
Myers threw 33 touchdown passes as a senior at Troy High School in Troy, Ohio. In his career, he passed for 73 touchdowns total. He made the Ohio State High School All-Stars team following his senior year.

== College career ==
Myers was named the starting quarterback for the Northwestern Wildcats as a freshman during spring practice; however, under eligibility rules of the day, Myers actually could not play in a game until his sophomore year.

== Professional career ==
Myers was selected by the Detroit Lions in the fourth round (46th overall) of the 1965 NFL draft and by the Denver Broncos in the twelfth round (89th overall) of the 1965 AFL draft. He chose to sign with the Lions and played in two games in his two NFL seasons.

== Death ==
Myers died in Raleigh, North Carolina on September 3, 2024, at the age of 81.
