= Lou Holland =

American gridiron football player (1941–2016)

Profile
- Position: Halfback

Personal information
- Born: December 13, 1941; Kenosha, Wisconsin, U.S.
- Died: February 16, 2016 (aged 74); Oak Park, Illinois, U.S.
- Listed height: 5 ft 9 in (1.75 m)
- Listed weight: 187 lb (85 kg)

Career information
- College: Wisconsin

Career history
- 1964: BC Lions

Awards and highlights
- Grey Cup champion (1964); First-team All-Big Ten (1963)

Louis Alfred Holland, Sr. (December 13, 1941 – February 16, 2016) was an American professional football player who played for the BC Lions. He won the Grey Cup with them in 1964. He played college football previously with the University of Wisconsin. After his football career he was an investment management executive. In 2011, he was inducted into the University of Wisconsin Athletics Hall of Fame. Holland was diagnosed with Alzheimer's disease in 2010 and lived in a nursing home in Oak Park, Illinois. He died in 2016 at the age of 74.
