= 1963 All-Big Ten Conference football team =

American college football all-star team

The 1963 All-Big Ten Conference football team consists of American football players chosen by various organizations for All-Big Ten Conference teams for the 1963 Big Ten Conference football season. The selectors for the 1963 season were the Associated Press (AP), based on a vote by media members, and the United Press International (UPI), based on a vote of the conference coaches. Players selected as first-team players by both the AP and UPI are designated in bold.

Michigan State halfback Sherman Lewis was the only player to be unanimously selected by all ten of the conference coaches as a first-team honoree. Minnesota tackle Carl Eller and Illinois center Dick Butkus were selected as first-team players by nine of the ten conference coaches.

== Quarterbacks ==
- **Ron DiGravio**, Purdue (AP-1; UPI-1)
- Tom Myers, Northwestern (AP-2; UPI-2)
- Mike Taliaferro, Illinois (UPI-3)

== Halfbacks ==
- **Sherman Lewis**, Michigan State (AP-1; UPI-1)
- Lou Holland, Wisconsin (AP-1; UPI-2)
- Paul Krause, Iowa (AP-2; UPI-2)
- Paul Warfield, Ohio State (AP-2; UPI-1)
- Sammy Price, Illinois (UPI-3)
- Fred Reichardt, Wisconsin (UPI-3)

== Fullbacks ==
- **Tom Nowatzke**, Indiana (AP-1; UPI-1)
- Jim Grabowski, Illinois (AP-2; UPI-3)
- Roger Lopes, Michigan State (UPI-2)

== Ends ==
- **Chuck Logan**, Northwestern (AP-1; UPI-1)
- Dan Underwood, Michigan State (AP-1; UPI-2)
- Bob Hadrick, Purdue (AP-2; UPI-1)
- Cloyd Webb, Iowa (AP-2; UPI-3)
- Jimmy Jones, Wisconsin (UPI-2)
- Bill Pasko, Illinois (UPI-3)

== Tackles ==
- **Carl Eller**, Minnesota (AP-1; UPI-1)
- Tom Keating, Michigan (AP-2; UPI-1)
- Roger Pillath, Wisconsin (AP-2; UPI-2)
- Archie Sutton, Illinois (AP-1; UPI-2)
- Dave Herman, Michigan State (UPI-3)
- Milt Sunde, Minnesota (UPI-3)

== Guards ==
- **Mike Reilly**, Iowa (AP-1; UPI-1)
- Joe O'Donnell, Michigan (AP-1; UPI-2)
- Wally Hilgenberg, Iowa (AP-3; UPI-1)
- Earl Latimer, Michigan State (AP-2; UPI-2)
- Tom Jenkins, Ohio State (AP-2; UPI-3)
- Don Croftcheck, Indiana (UPI-3)

== Centers ==
- **Dick Butkus**, Illinois (AP-1; UPI-1)
- Frank Marchlewski, Minnesota (AP-2; UPI-3)
- Ken Bowman, Wisconsin (UPI-2)

== Key ==
AP = Associated Press

UPI = United Press International, selected by the conference coaches

Bold = Consensus first-team selection of both the AP and UPI

== See also ==
- 1963 College Football All-America Team
