= Mike Taliaferro =

American football player (born 1941)

No. 17, 19
- Position: Quarterback

Personal information
- Born: July 26, 1941 (age 85); Houston, Texas, U.S.
- Listed height: 6 ft 2 in (1.88 m)
- Listed weight: 202 lb (92 kg)

Career information
- High school: Wheaton Warrenville South (Wheaton, Illinois)
- College: Illinois
- NFL draft: 1963: 10th round, 138th overall pick
- AFL draft: 1963: 28th round, 219th overall pick

Career history
- New York Jets (1964-1967); Boston Patriots (1968–1970); Buffalo Bills (1972); Washington Redskins (1972)*; Houston Texans (1974)
- * Offseason or practice squad member only

Awards and highlights
- AFL All-Star (1969); Rose Bowl champion (1964)

Career NFL/AFL statistics
- Passing attempts: 966
- Passing completions: 419
- Completion percentage: 43.4%
- TD–INT: 36–63
- Passing yards: 5,241
- Passer rating: 46.1
- Stats at Pro Football Reference

Myron Eugene Taliaferro (pronounced "tollifur", born July 26, 1941) is an American former professional football player who was a quarterback in the American Football League (AFL) and National Football League (NFL) with the New York Jets, Boston Patriots, and Buffalo Bills. He was an American Football League All-Star in the 1969 season, tying for most touchdown passes in the AFL that season while a member of the Patriots. Taliaferro played college football for the University of Illinois; and was the winning quarterback in the 1964 Rose Bowl.

== Early life ==
Taliaferro was born on July 26, 1941, in Houston. He attended Wheaton High School in Wheaton, Illinois as a high school senior, after moving to Wheaton from Texas. As a senior, he threw seven touchdown passes on Wheaton's football team, over six games. He also starred on the school's baseball team for two seasons.

Before attending Wheaton, Taliaferro attended Jesuit Dallas preparatory high school in Dallas. He played on Jesuit Dallas' football team, winning a Texas Catholic Interscholastic League championship as a junior in 1958; while alternating as the team's quarterback. Taliaferro returned to live in Dallas by the time he was a freshman in college.

== College career ==
Taliaferro attended the University of Illinois, where he was in the college of physical education. He played college football for the Illinois Fighting Illini. Taliaferro played little as a reserve quarterback during his freshman (1960) and sophomore (1961) seasons. He became the Illini's starting quarterback in 1962; with a 37.7 completion percentage, 1,139 passing yards, five touchdown passes and led all Division 1 quarterbacks with 17 interceptions.

As a senior (1963), Taliaferro shared quarterbacking duties with Fred Custardo, while still leading the team in passing attempts, yards, touchdowns, and interceptions. The Illini were Big Ten champions, with an 8–1–1 record that season, and played in the January 1, 1964 Rose Bowl. Taliaferro, future NFL running back and the game's most valuable player Jim Grabowski, and a strong defense that included future Hall of Fame linebacker Dick Butkus led the third-ranked Illinois to victory over Washington by the score of 17–7. During the Illini's final touchdown drive, Taliaferro twice completed passes to halfback Ron Fearn in third down and long yardage situations.

As a senior, Taliaferro was a third-team Academic All-American and first-team Academic All-Big Ten.

== Professional career ==
=== New York Jets ===
Taliaferro was taken as a future draft choice in the 1963 NFL draft by the New York Giants in the 10th round, 138th overall; and the 1963 AFL draft by the New York Jets in the 28th round, 219th overall. After playing one more season at Illinois, he signed with the Jets in February 1964.

In 1964 as a rookie, he was a reserve quarterback, playing behind Dick Wood. Taliaferro's sole start that season was in the Jets' penultimate game that year, against the Houston Oilers. Taliaferro completed seven passes in 15 attempts for 145 yards, one touchdown, and two interceptions.

The Jets drafted Alabama quarterback Joe Namath in the 1965 AFL draft, and entered an agreement to pay him $100,000 per year for three years, a $100,000 bonus, and annual $5,000 pension payments after his career ended; making him the highest paid rookie in professional football. Taliaferro started the first game of the 1965 season against the Houston Oilers in Houston, and only completed four passes in 21 attempts, for 58 yards. In the Jets' first home game that season the following week, Taliaferro was "booed ... unmercifully" by the New York fans for both the quality of his performance, but as much or more so because the fans wanted to see Namath playing quarterback. Namath replaced Taliaferro in that game, after Taliaferro completed four passes in 12 attempts for 24 yards.

Namath started the next two games, but Taliaferro replaced him in the season's fourth game against the Oakland Raiders when Namath appeared to be injured. Taliaferro rallied the team for a tie. Taliaferro started three more games that season. In 1966, he was the Jets' reserve quarterback behind Namath, attempting less that 45 passes that season. In 1967, he appeared in only three games for the Jets as Namath's backup, attempting less than 25 passes on the season.

=== Boston Patriots ===
Before the 1968 season, Taliaferro asked Jets' coach Weeb Ewbank to trade him so that Taliaferro might have another opportunity at starting quarterback. Ewbank obliged and in July 1968 traded Taliaferro to the Boston Patriots for Babe Parilli. Taliaferro started the Patriots' first seven games that season, and did not play in any further games. After suffering from a sore shoulder, Taliaferro was replaced by rookie Tom Sherman. On the season, Taliaferro had a 38.1 completion percentage, 889 yards passing, four touchdowns, and 15 interceptions.

The 1969 season was the best of Taliaferro's career. He started all 14 games for the Patriots in 1969. He completed 160 of 331 passing attempts (48.3 per cent), for 2,160 yards, 19 touchdowns, and 18 interceptions. Taliaferro was selected to play in the AFL All-Star Game that season. His 19 touchdowns were tied with Namath for most in the AFL that season.

Taliaferro started the first four games for the Patriots in 1970. However, the Patriots acquired quarterback Joe Kapp from the Minnesota Vikings at the start of October. Kapp was a Pro Bowl quarterback for the 1969 Minnesota Vikings, and came in second in the NFL's Most Valuable Player voting that year while leading the Vikings to the Super Bowl. Before the 1970 season, Kapp and the Vikings were at loggerheads over his salary and future contract demands, and Kapp was a holdout before being sent in an "arrangement" to the Patriots for John Charles and a draft choice. Kapp started the final 10 games of the Patriots' 1970 season at quarterback, with a 1–9 record.

The Patriots drafted 1970 Heisman Trophy winning quarterback Jim Plunkett with the No. 1 selection in the 1971 NFL draft. The Patriots chose Plunkett as their starting quarterback over Taliaferro in 1971, and Taliaferro did not come in for a single play that season. Taliaferro did not report to the Patriots' training camp in 1972, and he was released in early August.

=== Buffalo Bills ===
The Buffalo Bills claimed Taliaferro off waivers a few days after the Patriots released him. He served as a backup quarterback to Dennis Shaw that season; attempting less than 40 passes on the season. Taliaferro suffered a shoulder injury that year, in a November game against the Jets where he had come in to replace Shaw with the Bills behind by 21 points at halftime. The Bills waived Taliaferro less than one week later. Taliaferro played in only five games that season for the Bills; his last in the NFL. He joined the Washington Redskins' taxi squad a few days after that; and retired in July 1973.

Overall, Taliaffero played in eight AFL and NFL seasons from 1964 to 1972 for three teams, and was an AFL All-Star in 1969. He played in 82 games, with 32 starts. He had a career 43.4 completion percentage, and passed for 5,241 yards, 36 touchdowns, and 63 interceptions; while being sacked 80 times.

=== World Football League ===
In 1974, Taliaferro signed with the Houston Texans of the World Football League (WFL). He suffered a hamstring injury in the first half of the team's first game and had to be replaced. On the season, he completed 74 of 143 pass attempts for 833 yards, with five touchdowns and eight interceptions. When the team moved to Shreveport, Louisiana during its opening season, Taliaferro said he would not be able to follow the team there and he was deactivated.

== Personal life ==
After retiring from professional football Taliaferro worked as a mortgage banker, primarily involving single family homes; living in Texas with his wife Kathleen and their family.
