= Cloyd Webb =

American gridiron football player (1942–1991)

Profile
- Positions: Linebacker, End

Personal information
- Born: February 13, 1942; East St. Louis, Illinois, U.S.
- Died: March 15, 1991 (aged 49); Milwaukee, Wisconsin, U.S.
- Listed height: 6 ft 5 in (1.96 m)
- Listed weight: 225 lb (102 kg)

Career information
- College: Iowa
- NFL draft: 1964: 13th round, 182nd overall pick
- AFL draft: 1964: 11th round, 85th overall pick

Career history
- 1965: Winnipeg Blue Bombers
- 1965: Hamilton Tiger-Cats

Awards and highlights
- Grey Cup champion (1965); Second-team All-Big Ten (1963)

Cloyd William Webb (February 13, 1942 – March 15, 1991) was an American professional football player who played for the Hamilton Tiger-Cats and Winnipeg Blue Bombers. He won the Grey Cup with the Tiger-Cats in 1965. He played college football at the University of Iowa, where he was also an All-American discus thrower for the Iowa Hawkeyes track and field team. Webb was drafted by the Chicago Bears in the 13th round of the 1964 NFL draft, but did not play in the league.
