= Paul Warfield =

American football player (born 1942)

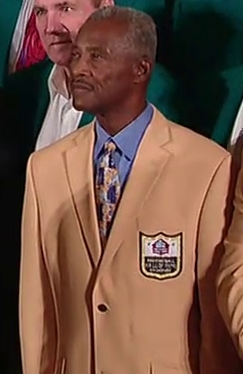
- Warfield in 2013

No. 42
- Position: Wide receiver

Personal information
- Born: November 28, 1942 (age 83); Warren, Ohio, U.S.
- Listed height: 6 ft 0 in (1.83 m)
- Listed weight: 188 lb (85 kg)

Career information
- High school: Warren G. Harding (Warren, Ohio)
- College: Ohio State
- NFL draft: 1964: 1st round, 11th overall pick
- AFL draft: 1964: 4th round, 28th overall pick

Career history
- Cleveland Browns (1964–1969); Miami Dolphins (1970–1974); Memphis Southmen (1975); Cleveland Browns (1976–1977)

Awards and highlights
- 2× Super Bowl champion (VII, VIII); NFL champion (1964); 2× First-team All-Pro (1971, 1973); 3× Second-team All-Pro (1968, 1970, 1972); 8× Pro Bowl (1964, 1968–1974); 2× NFL receiving touchdowns leader (1968, 1971); NFL 1970s All-Decade Team; NFL 100th Anniversary All-Time Team; Cleveland Browns Ring of Honor; Miami Dolphins Honor Roll; Dolphins Walk of Fame (2011); National champion (1961); First-team All-American (1963); 2× First-team All-Big Ten (1962, 1963)

Career NFL statistics
- Receptions: 427
- Receiving yards: 8,565
- Receiving touchdowns: 85
- Stats at Pro Football Reference
- Pro Football Hall of Fame

Paul Dryden Warfield (born November 28, 1942) is an American former professional football player who was a wide receiver in the National Football League (NFL) from 1964 to 1977 for the Cleveland Browns and Miami Dolphins, except for a year in the World Football League (WFL) with the Memphis Southmen in 1975. He was known for his speed, fluid moves, grace, and jumping ability. A consistent big-play threat throughout his career, his 20.1 average yards per reception is the highest in NFL history among players with at least 300 receptions.

As a star halfback playing college football for the Ohio State Buckeyes, Warfield was twice named to the all-conference team in the Big Ten. An All-American as a senior, he was selected in the first round of the 1964 NFL draft by the Browns and converted into a wide receiver. After three Pro Bowl appearances with the Browns, he was traded to the Dolphins, with whom he made another five Pro Bowl appearances. He then spent one season in the WFL with the Southmen before returning to the Browns for his final two seasons of play.

Warfield played in seven championship games in his professional career—four NFL Championship Games with the Browns and three Super Bowls with the Dolphins—and earned victories in the 1964 NFL Championship Game, Super Bowl VII, and Super Bowl VIII. After his playing career, he served as a scout and adviser for the Browns for several years. He was inducted into the Pro Football Hall of Fame in 1983, and is a member of the Cleveland Browns Ring of Honor and the Miami Dolphins Honor Roll.

== Early life ==
Warfield was born in Warren, Ohio. His father, Dryden Warfield, was a deacon in a Baptist church. Warfield attended Warren G. Harding High School in Warren, where he was a star running back and defensive back for the Panthers. He scored 92 points as a junior in 1958, a campaign highlighted by a 6–0 victory over powerhouse Massillon Washington High School. As a senior he scored 93 points, including all three of his team's touchdowns in the final game of the season. As a basketball player he was noted for his speed, often leading fast breaks. He also ran track and field at Warren G. Harding, and was the Ohio High School Athletic Association Class AA broad jump champion in 1958. During the 1960 season he set a Class AA state record while winning the 180-yard hurdles.

== College career ==
Warfield attended Ohio State University, where he played for the Buckeyes football team under coach Woody Hayes. As he did in high school, he continued to star as both a running back and defensive back. He earned a national championship and a third-team All-Big Ten Conference selection in 1961 behind lead rusher, fullback Bob Ferguson, carrying 77 times for 420 yards and scoring five touchdowns.

In 1962 he rushed for 367 yards and two touchdowns, and his 6.4 yards-per-carry average led the Big Ten. As a senior in 1963 he rushed for 260 yards and a touchdown and caught 22 passes for 266 yards and three touchdowns. He was named a first team All-American (1963) and voted by the Big Ten's coaches as the first-team halfback on both the 1962 and 1963 All-Big Ten teams.

A two-time letterman in track and field at Ohio State, Warfield competed as a broad jumper, hurdler, and sprinter. He excelled as a broad jumper, recording a personal best of 26 feet 2 inches, and was an Olympic prospect before he decided to play professional football.

== Professional career ==
=== Cleveland Browns ===
The Cleveland Browns selected Warfield in the first round with the 11th overall pick of the 1964 NFL draft. There was some thought for Warfield to play as a defensive back. But during workouts prior to the season, his play as a wide receiver impressed head coach Blanton Collier, and he was converted to the position. In his rookie season, he caught 52 passes for 920 yards and nine touchdowns. He averaged 17.8 yards per reception, and his speed served to complement the power of star running back Jim Brown. The Browns finished the season atop the East Division with a 10–3–1 record, and defeated the Baltimore Colts 27–0 in the 1964 NFL Championship Game. Warfield was invited to his first Pro Bowl and was named a first-team All-Pro by the Newspaper Enterprise Association (NEA).

In the 1965 Chicago College All-Star Game, which annually pitted the reigning NFL champion against star college players, Warfield shattered his collarbone and missed the majority of the 1965 season as a result. He returned for the penultimate game of the season and caught three passes for 30 yards before bruising his collarbone, causing him to miss the final game of the regular season. The Browns returned to the NFL Championship Game in 1965, in which Warfield caught two passes for 30 yards in a 23–12 loss to the Green Bay Packers.

Warfield returned to form in 1966, catching 36 passes for 741 yards and five touchdowns, and in 1967 recorded 32 receptions for 702 yards and eight touchdowns. In 1968, Warfield caught 50 passes and for the only time in his career eclipsed 1,000 receiving yards, finishing with 1,067. His career-high 12 receiving touchdowns led the league that year. The Browns again reached the NFL Championship Game, where they were shutout by the Baltimore Colts, 34–0. Warfield earned first-team All-Pro honors from the Associated Press (AP), United Press International (UPI), Pro Football Weekly, and NEA, and made another Pro Bowl appearance.

After another NFL championship game appearance for the Browns and Pro Bowl season for Warfield in 1969, he was traded to the Miami Dolphins for the third pick in the 1970 draft. The trade came as a shock to Warfield, who had established himself as one of the Browns' most popular players. "I have to admit going to Miami was not a place I desired to go," said Warfield 30 years later. The Browns used the pick acquired in the trade on Purdue University quarterback Mike Phipps. The trade is considered one of the most lopsided in NFL history, as Phipps had only limited success for the Browns, while Warfield was a major factor in the Dolphins' championships in the early 1970s.

=== Miami Dolphins ===
In need of a deep-play receiver, Dolphins head coach Don Shula stated he "jumped at the chance" to acquire Warfield, saying he had always admired him and called him "a real thoroughbred, equal to the best in the game." In his first season with Miami, Warfield caught only 28 passes but recorded 703 yards, an average of 25.1 yards per catch. He was invited to his first Pro Bowl with the Dolphins and was named a second-team All-Pro by the NEA. The Dolphins finished with a 10–4 record and lost to the Oakland Raiders in the divisional round of the 1970 playoffs.

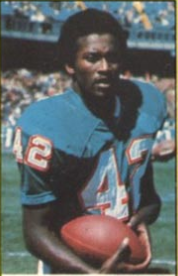
Warfield in 1971

In 1971, Warfield caught 43 passes for 996 yards and again led the league in receiving touchdowns, with 11. He earned first-team All-Pro honors from the AP and UPI, among other selectors, and made his fourth consecutive Pro Bowl appearance. Through the Dolphins' first two games of the 1971 playoffs, against the Kansas City Chiefs and Baltimore Colts, Warfield caught nine passes for 265 yards and a touchdown. Shortly before Super Bowl VI between the Dolphins and Dallas Cowboys, President Richard Nixon famously telephoned Dolphins coach Don Shula to suggest that they run a particular pass play to Warfield. The play, a down-and-in pattern, was tried and resulted in an incomplete pass. Covered by star defensive back Mel Renfro, Warfield was limited to four receptions for 39 yards as the Dolphins were defeated 24–3.

Warfield missed two games in the Dolphins' undefeated 1972 season due to an injured foot but still led the team with 606 receiving yards. Through Miami's three postseason games of 1972, Warfield caught seven passes for 149 yards and carried the ball twice for 41 yards. The Dolphins defeated the Washington Redskins in Super Bowl VII to earn their first Super Bowl title.

Although Warfield caught only 29 passes during the 1973 season, 11 of those receptions were touchdowns, with 4 coming in the first half of the regular season finale over the Detroit Lions. In the Dolphins' three playoff games that year, Warfield caught seven passes for 155 yards and a touchdown. The Dolphins reached the Super Bowl for the third consecutive year, and won it for the second straight time by defeating the Minnesota Vikings in Super Bowl VIII.

In 1974, Warfield caught 27 passes for 536 yards and 2 touchdowns, and was invited to the last of 2 consecutive Pro Bowls. The Dolphins again reached the playoffs, this time losing to the Raiders in the divisional round. Through 5 seasons with the Dolphins, Warfield compiled 156 receptions for 3,355 yards and 33 touchdowns. In 11 playoff games, he caught 34 passes for 717 yards and 4 touchdowns.

=== Memphis Southmen ===
In March 1974, he was selected by the Toronto Northmen in the second round (23rd overall) of the WFL Pro Draft. Prior to the start of the 1974 season, Warfield and teammates Larry Csonka and Jim Kiick made what were then surprising decisions. They left the Dolphins at the conclusion of the season for what appeared to be more lucrative pastures with the Northmen of World Football League (WFL). The Northmen then moved to Memphis, Tennessee, without playing a game in Toronto, and became the Memphis Southmen. Warfield played the 1975 season with the Memphis Southmen, catching 25 passes for 422 yards and three touchdowns.

=== Return to Browns and retirement ===
After the dissolution of the WFL following the 1975 season, Warfield told reporters he would be interested in rejoining the Browns if the Southmen were not admitted into the NFL. The Southmen were refused admittance, and Warfield was ultimately persuaded to rejoin by Browns owner Art Modell, who felt Warfield would be a valuable asset as both a receiver and in public relations. Warfield played his final two pro football seasons in Cleveland, catching 38 passes for 613 yards and six touchdowns in 1976 and 18 passes for 251 yards and two touchdowns in 1977. In his eight years with the Browns, he caught 271 passes for 5,210 yards and 52 touchdowns.

In his 13 NFL seasons Warfield caught 427 passes for 8,565 yards for 20.1 yards per catch and scored 85 touchdowns. He added another 204 yards on 22 rushing attempts. In 18 playoff games, he caught 58 passes for 1,121 yards and five touchdowns. His 85 career receiving touchdowns were tied for #3 in NFL history at the time of his retirement, and is tied for 19th most in 2025, and his 20.1 average yards per reception is tied for the fourth highest among players with at least 200 career receptions and the highest among players with at least 300 receptions. At the time of his retirement, his 1,121 postseason receiving yards were the second highest total in NFL history, trailing only Fred Biletnikoff by 46 yards.

== Career statistics ==
Legend
	Led the league
	Won NFL championship
	Won the Super Bowl
**Bold**	Career high

Year	Team	Games		Receiving					Rushing					Fum
Year	Team	GP	GS	Rec	Yds	Avg	Lng	TD	Att	Yds	Avg	Lng	TD	Fum
1964	CLE	**14**	**14**	**52**	920	17.7	62	9	0	0	0	0	0	0
1965	CLE	1	0	3	30	10.0	13	0	0	0	0	0	0	0
1966	CLE	**14**	**14**	36	741	20.6	51	5	0	0	0	0	0	0
1967	CLE	**14**	**14**	32	702	21.9	49	8	2	10	5.0	18	0	0
1968	CLE	**14**	**14**	50	**1,067**	21.3	65	**12**	0	0	0	0	0	0
1969	CLE	**14**	**14**	42	886	21.1	82	10	2	23	11.5	16	0	0
1970	MIA	11	11	28	703	**25.1**	54	6	2	13	6.5	16	0	0
1971	MIA	**14**	**14**	43	996	23.2	**86**	11	**9**	**115**	12.8	**39**	0	**3**
1972	MIA	12	11	29	606	20.9	47	3	4	23	5.8	21	0	1
1973	MIA	**14**	**14**	29	514	17.7	45	11	1	15	**15.0**	15	0	1
1974	MIA	9	9	27	536	19.9	54	2	0	0	0	0	0	0
1975	MIA	0	0	Missed season - Memphis Southmen (World Football League)										
1976	CLE	**14**	**14**	38	613	16.1	37	6	1	3	3.0	3	0	**3**
1977	CLE	12	9	18	251	13.9	52	2	1	2	2.0	2	0	0
Career		157	152	427	8,565	20.3	86	85	22	204	9.3	39	0	8

== Honors and later life ==
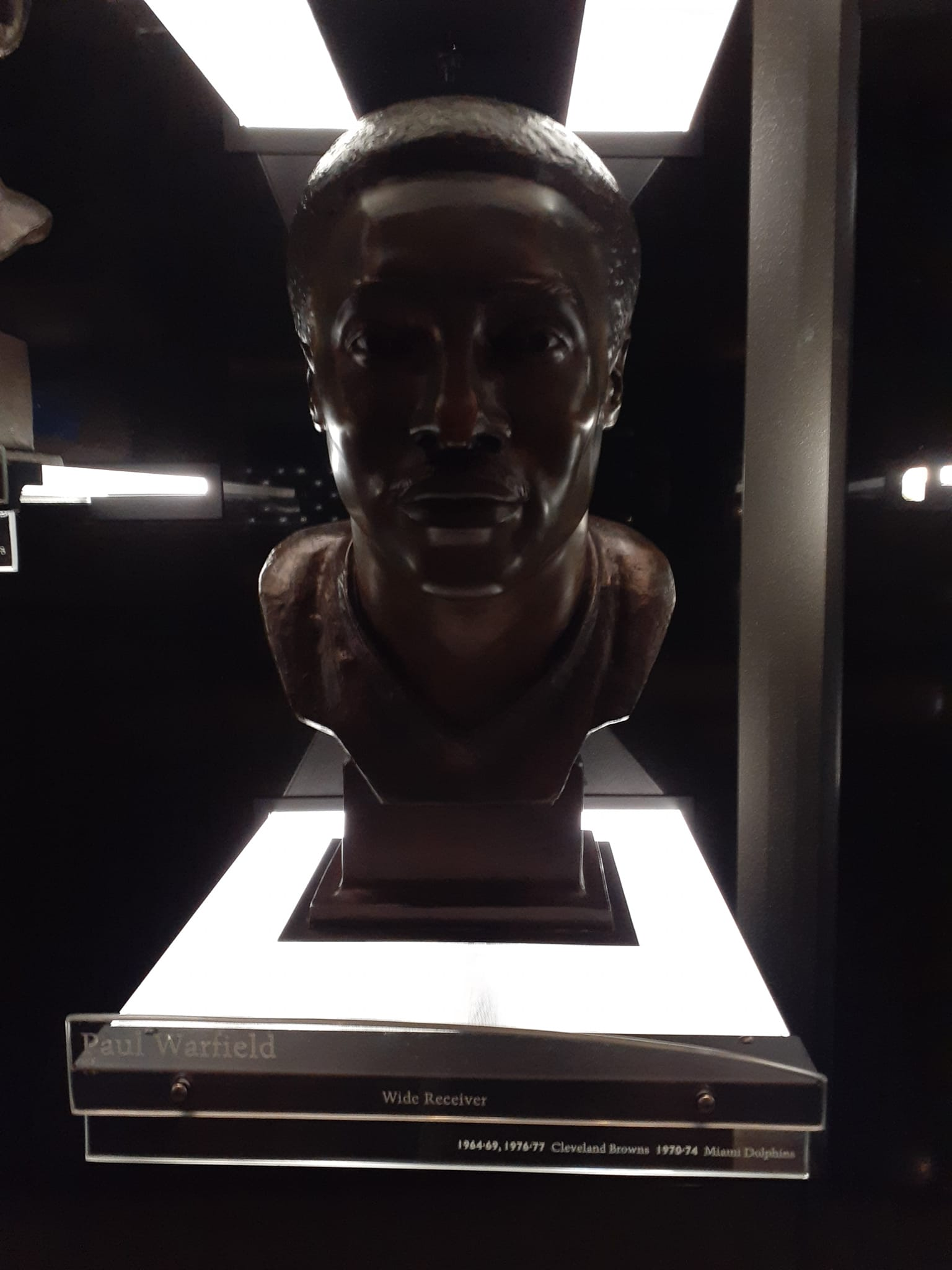
Warfield's bronze bust at the Pro Football Hall of Fame

Warfield was inducted into the Pro Football Hall of Fame in 1983, his first year of eligibility, one of only five Dolphins to accomplish this feat (Jim Langer, Jason Taylor, Dan Marino and Don Shula). He is a member of the NFL 1970s All-Decade Team as one of the best players of the decade. In 1992, he was inducted into the National High School Hall of Fame. In 1999, he was ranked 60th on The Sporting News' list of the 100 Greatest Football Players. He is on the Miami Dolphins Honor Roll, and was an inaugural inductee into the Cleveland Browns Ring of Honor in 2010. Warfield participated in the opening coin flip for the Ohio State–Michigan game in 2006 between the No. 1-ranked Buckeyes and No. 2-ranked Wolverines. In 2013, Warren G. Harding High School erected a life-size statue of Warfield near the school's stadium.

In 1977, Warfield earned a master's degree in telecommunications from Kent State University. During his time as a student, Warfield was a sportscaster for the morning drive program on the university's radio station, WKSU-FM, and presided over the station's first pledge drive in April 1974 following its conversion to a public radio outlet. He worked for WKYC in Cleveland as a sportscaster from 1977 to 1980. He also later served as president of a management consultant firm in Moraine, Ohio. From 1981 to 1987, he worked as director of player relations for the Browns, and from 2004 to 2010 was senior adviser to the general manager for the team. Warfield is retired and resides in Rancho Mirage, California.
