= Paul Krause =

American football player (born 1942)

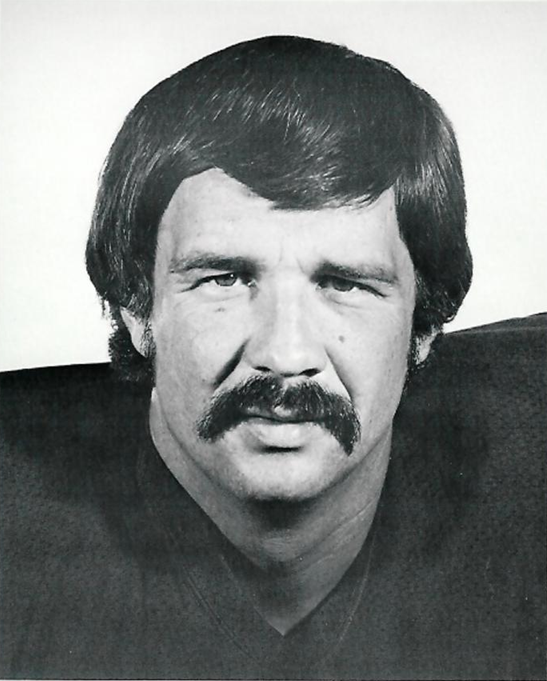
- Krause in 1978 photo

No. 26, 22
- Position: Safety

Personal information
- Born: February 19, 1942 (age 84); Flint, Michigan, U.S.
- Listed height: 6 ft 3 in (1.91 m)
- Listed weight: 200 lb (91 kg)

Career information
- High school: Bendle (Burton, Michigan)
- College: Iowa (1960–1963)
- NFL draft: 1964: 2nd round, 18th overall pick
- AFL draft: 1964: 12th round, 89th overall pick

Career history
- Washington Redskins (1964–1967); Minnesota Vikings (1968–1979)

Awards and highlights
- NFL champion (1969); 3× First-team All-Pro (1964, 1965, 1975); 3× Second-team All-Pro (1968, 1969, 1972); 8× Pro Bowl (1964, 1965, 1969, 1971–1975); NFL interceptions leader (1964); Minnesota Vikings Ring of Honor; 50 Greatest Vikings; Minnesota Vikings 25th Anniversary Team; Minnesota Vikings 40th Anniversary Team; Washington Commanders 90 Greatest; Second-team All-Big Ten (1963); NFL record: Most career interceptions: 81

Career NFL statistics
- Interceptions: 81
- Interception yards: 1,185
- Fumble recoveries: 19
- Defensive touchdowns: 6
- Stats at Pro Football Reference
- Pro Football Hall of Fame

Paul James Krause (born February 19, 1942) is an American former professional football player who was a safety in the National Football League (NFL) for the Minnesota Vikings and the Washington Redskins. Krause established himself as a proficient defensive force against opposing wide receivers. He led the league with 12 interceptions as a rookie before going on to set the NFL career interceptions record with 81 and was inducted into the Pro Football Hall of Fame in 1998. Krause was selected eight times to the Pro Bowl during his 16 seasons in the NFL and is considered to be among the greatest safeties in NFL history.

== Early life ==
Krause attended and played high school football at Bendle High School in Burton, Michigan, and earned all-state honors in basketball, football, baseball and track. Known for once scoring 78 points in a basketball game, he was one of the few in his high school to ever receive an athletic scholarship.

== College career ==
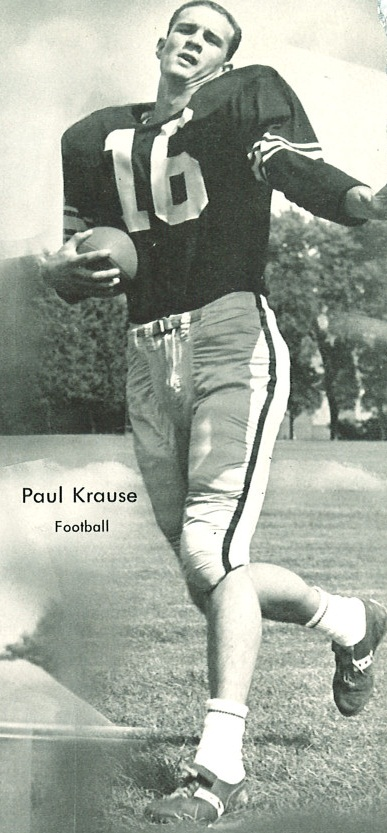
Krause with the Iowa Hawkeyes in 1963

Krause attended and played college football at the University of Iowa. He was a two-way starter as a wide receiver, running back, and defensive back. As a senior in 1963, he tied the Iowa record with six touchdown pass receptions and was selected for the Senior Bowl, the East-West Shrine game, the Coaches' All-American game and the College All-Star game. He finished his college career with 42 receptions for 718 yards, 49 carries for 263 yards, and 8 touchdowns.

Krause also played baseball at Iowa. As a sophomore, he earned All-American honors and was selected into the major leagues, but he turned down the offer. Krause's chances to play professional baseball were ended when he injured his shoulder in his junior year playing football against the University of Michigan.

== Professional career ==
=== Washington Redskins ===
Krause was drafted 18th overall in the second round of the 1964 NFL draft by the Washington Redskins. In his rookie season, he led the NFL in interceptions with 12, including interceptions in seven straight games, and was named to the All-NFL first team. He was named to his first of eight Pro Bowls and was second only to teammate Charley Taylor for the NFL Rookie of the Year award.

Although he intercepted 28 passes in his first four seasons with the Redskins, he was traded to the Minnesota Vikings for linebacker Marlin McKeever and a seventh-round draft choice in the 1968 NFL draft.

=== Minnesota Vikings ===
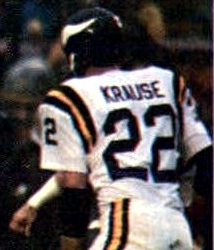
Krause with the Minnesota Vikings in 1977

Krause played with the Vikings until he retired after the 1979 season. During that time, he was one of 11 players to play in all four of the Vikings Super Bowl appearances (Super Bowl IV, VIII, IX, and XI). He also recorded an interception in the 1969 NFL Championship Game. Krause recorded an interception in Super Bowl IV and a fumble recovery in Super Bowl IX.

Krause was often referred to as the Vikings' "center fielder" because of his success as an interscholastic baseball player and his ability to catch interceptions. Krause's run of Pro Bowls and All-Pro selections concluded with the 1975 season, which saw him intercept 10 passes. It was the second time Krause intercepted ten passes in a season and it made him the seventh (and currently last) player in pro football history to have two 10-interception seasons. The next two seasons saw him record two interceptions each before the 1978 season start just two games (and make appearances in the other 14 games) and recorded zero interceptions.

In his final season of 1979, Krause appeared in 16 games with eight starts. In the December 2 game against the Los Angeles Rams, he set a new interception record in the second quarter to pass the previous record of 79 held by Emlen Tunnell (who like Krause played for Iowa). Krause recorded another interception in the fourth quarter of what ended up being a 27–21 overtime loss; these were his final interceptions as a player. He currently holds the all-time interception record in the NFL with 81, which he returned for 1,185 yards and three touchdowns. Krause recovered 19 fumbles, returning them for 163 yards and three touchdowns. Krause only missed two games due to injuries in 16 seasons.

=== After football ===
In 1994, Krause was elected to the Board of County Commissioners for Dakota County, Minnesota. He served for twenty years and he did not seek re-election in 2014.

Currently, Krause is involved in real estate development and insurance, and he owns several restaurants, including the Dairy Delite in Lakeville, Minnesota. He previously owned a golf course in Elk River, Minnesota.

Krause was named to the Iowa Sports Hall of Fame in 1985, the Pro Football Hall of Fame in 1998, and the Boys & Girls Clubs of Sarasota County Sports Hall of Fame on May 7, 2004.

The current scoreboard at Father Aagason Field (the former Holy Redeemer Field) in Burton, Michigan, was named in his honor, and was erected through funds from Meijer, Bendle High School boosters and Holy Redeemer Catholic Church parishioners.

== NFL career statistics ==
Legend
	Led the league
	NFL record
**Bold**	Career high

General			Interceptions				
Year	Team	GP	Int	Yds	Avg	Lng	TD
1964	WAS	14	**12**	140	11.7	35	**1**
1965	WAS	14	6	118	19.7	43	0
1966	WAS	13	2	0	0.0	0	0
1967	WAS	13	8	75	9.4	32	0
1968	MIN	14	7	82	11.7	29	0
1969	MIN	14	5	82	16.4	77	**1**
1970	MIN	14	6	90	15.0	40	0
1971	MIN	14	6	112	18.7	31	0
1972	MIN	14	6	109	18.2	35	**1**
1973	MIN	14	4	28	7.0	24	0
1974	MIN	14	2	53	**26.5**	45	0
1975	MIN	14	10	**201**	20.1	**81**	0
1976	MIN	14	2	21	10.5	19	0
1977	MIN	14	2	25	12.5	25	0
1978	MIN	16	—	—	—	—	—
1979	MIN	16	3	49	16.3	18	0
Career		226	81	1,185	14.6	81	3

== Personal life ==
Krause is married to his wife, Pam, and has two daughters and one son.
