= Sherman Lewis =

American football player and coach (1942–2026)

No. 21, 17, 7
- Position: Running back

Personal information
- Born: June 29, 1942; Louisville, Kentucky, U.S.
- Died: May 15, 2026 (aged 83)
- Listed height: 5 ft 9 in (1.75 m)
- Listed weight: 158 lb (72 kg)

Career information
- High school: duPont Manual (Louisville)
- College: Michigan State (1960–1963)
- NFL draft: 1964: 18th round, 250th overall pick
- AFL draft: 1964: 9th round, 67th overall pick

Career history

Playing
- Toronto Argonauts (1964–1965); Saskatchewan Roughriders (1965); New York Jets (1966–1967); Waterbury Orbits (1967)

Coaching
- Michigan State (1969–1982) Assistant coach; San Francisco 49ers (1983–1991); Running backs coach (1983–1990); Wide receivers coach (1991); Green Bay Packers (1992–1999) Offensive coordinator; Minnesota Vikings (2000–2001) Offensive coordinator; Detroit Lions (2003–2004) Offensive coordinator; Washington Redskins (2009) Offensive consultant

Awards and highlights
- As player: Consensus All-American (1963); First-team All-Big Ten (1963); 2× Second-team All-Big Ten (1961, 1962); As coach: 4× Super Bowl champion (XIX, XXIII, XXIV, XXXI)

Career AFL statistics
- Fumble recoveries: 2
- Kick/punt return yards: 243
- Stats at Pro Football Reference
- Coaching profile at Pro Football Reference

Sherman Paul Lewis (June 29, 1942 – May 15, 2026) was an American professional football player and coach. He played in the American Football League (AFL) and Canadian Football League (CFL) before spending 34 years as a coach. Lewis played college football for the Michigan State Spartans.

== Career ==
Lewis began his collegiate football career at Michigan State University as a halfback. He was named a consensus All-American and finished third behind winner Roger Staubach and runner-up Billy Lothridge for the Heisman Trophy in 1963. Lewis was named Player of the Year by The Football News. His professional playing career included parts of the 1964 and 1965 seasons with the Toronto Argonauts of the Canadian Football League. He also played the 1966 and 1967 seasons with the New York Jets of the American Football League.

After a brief career as a professional football player, he was hired as an assistant coach for the football team at his alma mater, Michigan State, from 1969 through 1982. He went on to become the running backs coach for Bill Walsh, under whom the San Francisco 49ers won three Super Bowls. In 1992, he became the offensive coordinator for the Green Bay Packers under head coach Mike Holmgren. Despite his success as a coordinator, Lewis notably never became a head coach, with Lewis not being interviewed for a position even during the victorious 1996 season. Despite being endorsed by Holmgren, he never was hired to become a head coach. When asked in 2015 about his career, he stated, "We won Super Bowls in San Francisco and one in Green Bay. And I got to work with some great coaches and players. No question I wished I had the chance to be a head coach. But looking back, I did all I could. I was disappointed, but I'm not going to hang my hat on that. I had a great career and was fortunate to coach in the NFL."

In October 2009, Lewis was hired by the Washington Redskins to serve as an offensive consultant for the team under head coach Jim Zorn. He eventually began to call plays for the team after Zorn was stripped of those duties by the team's front office. Lewis was not retained after the season. In 2023, he was a recipient of the Award of Excellence by the Pro Football Hall of Fame.

== Personal life ==
Lewis earned a master's degree in education administration from Michigan State in 1974.

Lewis died on May 15, 2026, at the age of 83.
