= Lynn D. Stewart (businessman) =

American restaurateur and businessman

- Born: October 10, 1943 (age 83); Woodstock, Illinois, U.S.
- Education: University of Illinois at Urbana–Champaign
- Occupations: Businessman, restaurateur
- Employer: Hooters
- Known for: Majority shareholder and co-founder of the original Hooters Restaurant chain
- Title: C.E.O. retired
- Board member of: Director of Pearly's Oasis and L.D. Stewarts Custom Homes, Inc.
- Spouse: Juanita Stewart

Lynn "L.D." Stewart (born October 10, 1943) is an American businessman. In 1983, he and five associates opened the first Hooters, Inc. restaurant in Clearwater, Florida. The collective Hooters brand has since expanded to more than 430 stores worldwide.

== Early life ==
Born Lynn D. Stewart in Woodstock, Illinois, in 1943, Stewart gained early fame as an offensive guard playing for the 1963 Fighting Illini squad alongside center Dick Butkus, tackle Archie Sutton, and running back Jim Grabowski. The team defeated UCLA, Michigan, and fourth-ranked Michigan State during the regular season. The Fighting Illini squad then topped Washington 17–7 in the 1964 Rose Bowl.

Following college, Stewart served three years in the U.S. Army. Afterward he took a job working for an interstate construction company in Atlanta. He also worked for a time as a coal mine foreman in Chattanooga, Tennessee. When he realized that working in a mine was extremely hazardous, he moved his family from Chattanooga to Florida, where they had relatives. He and his wife Juanita have two sons.

== Business ventures ==
=== Hooters ===
Stewart and five business associates opened the first Hooters in Clearwater, Florida, on April Fools' Day, April 1, 1983, as an inside joke because they were sure they would fail at the venture, even going so far as placing tombstones bearing the names of previous tenants who failed in that location outside the entrance of their new establishment. Stewart said of opening the first Hooters: "I had every intention of being broke in six months."

Nearly all of the restaurant's original recipes came from Stewart's test kitchen. Although critics of the Hooter's name and concept dubbed it the nation's first "breastaurant", the concept was a success, and the business started to turn a profit in just four months. The group rapidly expanded the business. In 1996, the Hooters chain generated more than $300 million in revenue. The chain has grown to over 425 restaurants in 44 states and 12 countries. Stewart owned a 51% majority stake of the business until he sold his shares in 1995 to a group led by Robert H. Brooks.

==== Tax evasion trial ====
The United States Federal Government and Internal Revenue Service filed charges against Stewart in 2005, claiming that he failed to report $11 million in income which he earned by selling his stock and ownership in Hooters Inc. Stewart was charged with two counts each of tax evasion and of filing false income-tax returns for the years 1997 and 1998. Stewart maintained that his personal assistant and financier, Mike Maricle, was to blame for any tax discrepancies. The trial ended after three weeks in a mistrial.

=== Other enterprises ===
Before starting Hooter's, Stewart owned a general contracting company called L.D. Stewart Enterprises. He also served as director of Pearly's Oasis. Both firms were based in St. Petersburg, Florida.
