= George Halas Trophy =

The George Halas Trophy may refer to:

- The trophy given to the winner of the NFC Championship Game in the National Football League.
- Newspaper Enterprise Association NFL defensive player of the year

== See also ==
- George Halas Award, awarded by the Pro Football Writers Association for person who overcomes adversity to succeed
