= 1963 All-East football team =

American college football all-star team

The 1963 All-East football team consists of American football players chosen by various selectors as the best players at each position among the Eastern colleges and universities during the 1963 NCAA University Division football season.

The 1963 Navy Midshipmen football team was ranked No. 2 in the final AP and UPI polls. Navy's quarterback Roger Staubach won the 1963 Heisman Trophy and was named to the All-Eastern first team by both the AP and the UPI.

The 1963 Pittsburgh Panthers football team was ranked No. 3 in the final UPI poll (No. 4 in the AP poll) and placed three players on the first team: halfback Paul Martha; tackle Ernie Borghetti; and guard Ed Adamchik.

== Backs ==
- Roger Staubach, Navy (AP-1, UPI-1 [qb])
- Paul Martha, Pittsburgh (AP-1, UPI-1 [hb])
- Cosmo Iacavazzi, Princeton (AP-1, UPI-1 [fb])
- Mike Brown, Delaware (AP-1)
- Gary Wood, Cornell (AP-1)
- Ken Waldrop, Army (UPI-1)
- Jack Concannon, Boston College (AP-2)
- Archie Roberts, Columbia (AP-2)
- Rick Leeson, Pittsburgh (AP-2)
- John Sai, Navy (AP-2)
- Jerry Whelchel, Massachusetts (AP-3)
- Pete Liske, Penn State (AP-3)
- Tom Spangenberg, Dartmouth (AP-3)
- Bill Grana, Harvard (AP-3)

== Ends ==
- Jim Whalen, Boston College (AP-1, UPI-1)
- John Parry, Brown (AP-1)
- Dick Bowers, Syracuse (UPI-1)
- Al Grigaliunas, Pittsburgh (AP-2)
- Scott Creelman, Dartmouth (AP-2)
- Jim Campbell, Navy (AP-3)
- Dick Anderson, Penn State (AP-3)

== Tackles ==
- Ernie Borghetti, Pittsburgh (AP-1, UPI-1)
- Jim Freeman, Navy (AP-2, UPI-1)
- Gerry Philbin, Buffalo (AP-1)
- Al Atkinson, Villanova (AP-2)
- Bill Guedel, Princeton (AP-3)
- Perry Wickstrom, Yale (AP-3)

== Guards ==
- Dick Nowak, Army (AP-1, UPI-1)
- Glenn Ressler, Penn State (AP-1)
- Ed Adamchik, Pittsburgh (UPI-1)
- Bill Budness, Boston University (AP-2)
- Fred Marlin, Navy (AP-2)
- Bill Thompson, Coast Guard (AP-3)
- Dick Cremin, Boston College (AP-3)

== Center ==
- Jon Morris, Holy Cross (AP-1, UPI-1)
- Ed Contin, Syracuse (AP-2)
- Brad Stephens, Harvard (AP-3)

== Key ==
- AP = Associated Press
- UPI = United Press International

== See also ==
- 1963 College Football All-America Team
