= 1964 All-East football team =

American college football all-star team

The 1964 All-East football team consists of American football players chosen by various selectors as the best players at each position among the Eastern colleges and universities during the 1964 NCAA University Division football season.

== Offense ==
=== Backs ===
- Roger Staubach, Navy (AP-1 [qb-tie])
- Archie Roberts, Columbia (AP-1 [qb-tie])
- Floyd Little, Syracuse (AP-1)
- Carl Stichweh, Army (AP-1)
- Jim Nance, Syracuse (AP-1)

=== Ends ===
- Jim Whalen, Boston College (AP-1)
- Milt Morin, UMass (AP-1)

=== Tackles ===
- John Simko, Penn State (AP-1)
- Jim Freeman, Navy (AP-1)

=== Guards ===
- Tom Nissi, Holy Cross (AP-1)
- Ray Popp, Pittsburgh (AP-1)

=== Center ===
- Pat Killorin, Syracuse (AP-1)

== Defense ==
=== Ends ===
- Bill Cronin, Boston College (AP-1)
- Bud Yosl, Penn State (AP-1)

=== Tackles ===
- Al Atkinson, Villanova (AP-1)
- Abbott Lawrence, Yale (AP-1)

=== Linebackers ===
- Glenn Ressler, Penn State (AP-1)
- Marty Schottenheimer, Pittsburgh (AP-1)
- Stas Maliszewski, Princeton (AP-1)

=== Backs ===
- Frank Hershey, Penn State (AP-1)
- Charley Brown, Syracuse (AP-1)
- Cosmo Iacavazzi, Princeton (AP-1)
- Jim McGowan, Boston College (AP-1)

== Key ==
- AP = Associated Press
- UPI = United Press International

== See also ==
- 1964 College Football All-America Team
