= Archie Sutton =

American football player (1941–2015)

No. 72
- Position: Offensive tackle

Personal information
- Born: November 2, 1941; New Orleans, Louisiana, U.S.
- Died: August 29, 2015 (aged 73); Yakima, Washington, U.S.
- Listed height: 6 ft 4 in (1.93 m)
- Listed weight: 262 lb (119 kg)

Career information
- High school: Xavier Prep
- College: Illinois (1961-1964)
- NFL draft: 1965: 2nd round, 15th overall pick

Career history
- Minnesota Vikings (1965–1967); New Orleans Saints (1968)*
- * Offseason or practice squad member only

Awards and highlights
- Second-team All-American (1963); 2× First-team All-Big Ten (1963, 1964)

Career NFL statistics
- Games played: 19
- Games started: 2
- Stats at Pro Football Reference

Archie Michael Sutton (November 2, 1941 – August 29, 2015) was an American professional football player who played offensive tackle for three seasons for the Minnesota Vikings.

Sutton found early fame as a tackle playing for the Illini alongside center, Dick Butkus; offensive guard, L.D. Stewart; and running back, Jim Grabowski. This powerhouse team defeated UCLA, Michigan, and (No. 4) Michigan State during the regular season. The Fighting Illini squad then topped Washington 17–7 in the 1964 Rose Bowl. He died in 2015.
