= 1964 All-America college football team =

Official list of the best college football players of 1964

The 1964 All-America college football team is composed of college football players who were selected as All-Americans by various organizations that chose All-America college football teams in 1964. The six selectors recognized by the NCAA as "official" for the 1964 season are (1) the Associated Press (AP), (2) the United Press International (UPI), (3) the American Football Coaches Association (AFCA), (4) the Football Writers Association of America (FWAA), (5) the Central Press Association (CP), and (6) the Newspaper Enterprise Association (NEA). Other selectors include Time magazine, Football News, and The Sporting News.

AP, UPI, NEA, and Central Press were all press organizations that polled writers and players. FWAA was also a poll of writers, and the AFCA was a poll of college coaches. The Sporting News and Time magazine polled football scouts and coaches. AP, UPI, NEA, Central Press, and The Sporting News chose both first and second teams. AP, UPI, NEA, and Central Press also listed numerous honorable mentions.

== Consensus All-Americans ==
For the year 1964, the NCAA recognizes seven published All-American teams as "official" designations for purposes of its consensus determinations. The following chart identifies the NCAA-recognized consensus All-Americans and displays which first-team designations they received.

Name	Position	School	Number	Official	Other
Jack Snow	End	Notre Dame	5/6	AFCA, CP, FWAA, NEA, UPI	FN, SN, Time, WC
Dick Butkus	Center	Illinois	5/6	AFCA, AP, CP, FWAA, UPI	FN, SN, Time, WC
Gale Sayers	Back	Kansas	5/6	AFCA, AP, FWAA, NEA, UPI	FN, SN, Time, WC
Larry Kramer	Tackle	Nebraska	5/6	AFCA, AP, FWAA, NEA, UPI-1	FN, CP, WC
Glenn Ressler	Guard	Penn State	4/6	AFCA, CP, FWAA, NEA	FN, SN, Time, WC
Larry Elkins	Back	Baylor	4/6	AFCA, AP, FWAA, UPI	FN, SN, Time, WC
Tucker Frederickson	Back	Auburn	4/6	AP, CP, FWAA, NEA	SN, Time, WC
Fred Biletnikoff	End	Florida State	4/6	AP, CP, FWAA, NEA	FN, WC
Rick Redman	Guard	Washington	4/6	AFCA, CP, FWAA, UPI	FN
John Huarte	Quarterback	Notre Dame	3/6	AP, CP, UPI	FN, WC
Ralph Neely	Tackle	Oklahoma	2/6	AFCA, UPI-1	FN, SN, Time, WC

== Offense ==
=== Ends and flankers ===
- Fred Biletnikoff, Florida State (AFCA-2, AP-1, CP-1, FN [end], FWAA, NEA-1, UPI-2, WC)
- Jack Snow, Notre Dame (AFCA, AP-2, CP-1, FN [end], FWAA, NEA-1, SN, UPI-1, Time, WC)
- Karl Noonan, Iowa (AFCA-3, AP-2, NEA-1 [flanker], UPI-3, FN [end])
- Bob Hadrick, Purdue (AFCA-2, UPI-3, CP-2)
- Howard Twilley, Tulsa (AFCA-3, CP-2, NEA-3 [flanker], UPI-2)
- David Ray, Alabama (FN [end])
- Charles Casey, Florida (NEA-2, CP-3)
- Fred Hill, USC (NEA-2)
- Len Frketich, Oregon State (NEA-3)
- Jim Whalen, Boston College (NEA-3)

=== Offensive tackles ===
- Larry Kramer, Nebraska (AP-1, UPI, NEA-1, CP-1, WC, AFCA-1, FWAA, FN [tackle])
- Ralph Neely, Oklahoma (UPI, Time, WC, AFCA-1, SN, FN [tackle])
- Jim Wilson, Georgia (AP-1, CP-2, NEA-1, FWAA, UPI-3)
- Harry Schuh, Memphis State (AFCA-2, UPI-2, Time)
- Jerry Rush, Michigan State (AP-2, NEA-3 [def. tackle])
- Dennis Murphy, Florida (FN [tackle])
- Richard Koeper, Oregon State (AP-2)
- Butch Allison, Missouri (NEA-2)
- Bill Zadel, Army (AFCA-2, NEA-3, UPI-3, CP-3)
- Karl Singer, Purdue (NEA-3)

=== Guards ===
- Glenn Ressler, Penn State (AFCA-1, AP-2 [linebacker], CP-1, FN [center], FWAA, NEA-1 [center], SN, UPI-2, WC, Time [T])
- Tommy Nobis, Texas (AFCA-2, AP-1, FN, FWAA, NEA-1, UPI-1, CP-3)
- Stas Maliszewski, Princeton (FWAA)
- Wayne Freeman, Alabama (AP-2, NEA-1)
- Don Croftcheck, Indiana (NEA-2, SN)
- Archie Sutton, Illinois (Time)
- Bill Fisk, Jr., Southern California (AP-1)
- Stan Hindman, Ole Miss (NEA-3, FN)
- Jack Abendschan, New Mexico (AP-2)
- John Niland, Iowa (NEA-2)

=== Centers ===
- Dick Butkus, Illinois (AFCA-1, AP-1 [linebacker], CP-1, FN, FWAA, NEA-2 [linebacker], SN, UPI-1, Time, WC)
- Malcolm Walker, Rice (Time, SN)
- Pat Killorin, Syracuse (AP-1)
- Richard Granier, LSU (AP-2)
- Joe Cerne, Northwestern (NEA-2)

=== Quarterbacks ===
- John Huarte, Notre Dame (AFCA-2, AP-1, CP-1, FN, UPI-1, WC)
- Craig Morton, California (AFCA-1, AP-2, FN, FWAA, NEA-1, SN, Time, UPI-3)
- Bob Timberlake, Michigan (AP-1, CP-3, FWAA, FN [halfback], NEA-2 [running back], UPI-2 [back])
- Jerry Rhome, Tulsa (AFCA-3, AP-2, CP-2, FN, FWAA, NEA-3, UPI-1)
- Bob Berry, Oregon (AFCA-1, AP-2, NEA-2)
- Bob Schweickert, Virginia Tech (AP-2, FWAA)
- Roger Staubach, Navy (FN [halfback])

=== Running backs ===
- Larry Elkins, Baylor (AFCA-1 [end], AP-1 [end], FN [end], FWAA, NEA-2 [flanker], SN, UPI-1 [end], CP-3 [end], Time, WC)
- Gale Sayers, Kansas (AFCA-1, AP-1, CP-2, FN [halfback], FWAA, NEA-1, SN, UPI-1, WC, Time)
- Donny Anderson, Texas Tech (AFCA-3, AP-1, NEA-1, FWAA, Time, UPI-2, SN, FN [halfback])
- Floyd Little, Syracuse (FWAA, FN [halfback], NEA-3, CP-3)
- Mike Garrett, USC (AFCA-3, CP-1, UPI-2)
- Jim Grabowski, Illinois (CP-2, UPI-1, FN [fullback])
- Tom Nowatzke, Indiana (AFCA-1 [fullback], AP-2 [defensive back], UPI-3 [back])
- Larry Dupree, Florida (AFCA-1)
- Brian Piccolo, Wake Forest (AFCA-3, AP-2 [defensive back], FN [halfback], NEA-2, UPI-2 [back], CP-3 [fullback])
- Jim Grisham, Oklahoma (FN [fullback])
- Cosmo Iacavazzi, Princeton (NEA-3, FN [fullback], UPI-3 [back])
- Ken Willard, North Carolina (AFCA-2, CP-2 [back])

== Defense ==
=== Defensive ends ===
- Allen Brown, Mississippi (AP-1, Time, SN)
- Ray Rissmiller, Georgia (Time, SN)
- Al Atkinson, Villanova (AFCA-3 [tackle], CP-2 [end], NEA-1)
- Alphonse Dotson, Grambling (NEA-1)
- Harold Wells, Purdue (AP-1)
- Jack Jacobson, Oklahoma State (AP-2)
- Bill Cronin, Boston College (AP-2)
- Verlon Biggs, Jackson State (NEA-2)
- Aaron Brown, Minnesota (NEA-2)
- Glenn Sasser, North Carolina St. (NEA-3)
- Roy Jefferson, Utah (NEA-3, FN [end])

=== Defensive tackles ===
- Bill Yearby, Michigan (AFCA-3, AP-2, CP-1 [tackle], FN [tackle], NEA-1, UPI-2)
- Jim Davidson, Ohio State (NEA-2 [off. tackle], SN, Time)
- Dan Kearley, Alabama (AP-1)
- John Van Sicklen, Iowa State (AP-1)
- Remi Prudhomme, LSU (NEA-1, FN [tackle])
- Ed Orazen, Ohio State (FN [tackle], CP-3 [tackle])
- John Frick, Ohio Univ. (AP-2, NEA-3 [off. guard])
- Jim Garcia, Purdue (NEA-2)
- Kent Francisco, UCLA (NEA-2)
- Kevin Hardy, Notre Dame (NEA-3)

=== Middle guards ===
- Steve DeLong, Tennessee (AP-1 [linebacker], NEA-1, FWAA, UPI-2, Time, FN [guard], CP-3 [guard])
- Ike Kelley, Ohio State (AFCA-2 [guard], FWAA, FN [center], NEA-2, UPI-3)
- Malcolm Walker, Rice (NEA-3)

=== Linebackers ===
- Rick Redman, Washington (AFCA-1 [guard], CP-1 [guard], FN [guard], FWAA, NEA-3, UPI-1)
- Ronnie Caveness, Arkansas (AFCA-3 [guard], AP-1, CP-2 [guard], NEA-1, FWAA, Time, SN, UPI-3 [guard], FN [guard])
- Jim Carroll, Notre Dame (AFCA-3 [guard], CP-2 [guard], Time, SN, UPI-2 [guard], FN [guard])
- Jack O'Billovich, Oregon State (NEA-1)
- Carl McAdams, Oklahoma (AFCA-3 [center], AP-2, NEA-1, CP-3)
- Marty Schottenheimer, Pitt (AP-2, NEA-2)
- Bill Curry, Georgia Tech (AFCA-2 [center], CP-2 [center], NEA-2, UPI-3 [center])
- Jack Chapple, Stanford (NEA-3)
- Mike Curtis, Duke (NEA-3)

=== Defensive backs ===
- Tucker Frederickson, Auburn (AFCA-2 [fullback], AP-1, Time, NEA, CP-1 [back], WC, FWAA, SN, UP-3)
- Clancy Williams, Washington State (AP-1, NEA, FWAA, CP-3 [back], Time, SN)
- Arnie Chonko, Ohio State (AP-1, NEA-1)
- Cosmo Iacavazzi, Princeton (AP-1, CP-1 [fullback], FN)
- Roy Jefferson, Utah (Time, SN, FN)
- George Donnelly, Illinois (NEA-3, SN, Time)
- Gerry Bussell, Georgia Tech (Time, SN)
- Ken Hatfield, Arkansas (AP-2, NEA-3 [safety])
- Bruce Bennett, Florida (AP-2)
- Wayne Swinford, Georgia (NEA-2)
- Tony Carey, Notre Dame (NEA-2)
- Mickey Andrews, Alabama (NEA-2 [safety])
- Rodger Bird, Kentucky (AFCA-2)
- Kent McCloughan, Nebraska (NEA-3)

== Key ==
- **Bold** – Consensus All-American
- -1 – First-team selection
- -2 – Second-team selection
- -3 – Third-team selection

=== Official selectors ===
- AFCA = American Football Coaches Association, base on a poll of coaches with 512 coaches participating; AFCA chose one eleven-man squad.
- AP = Associated Press – In 1964, the AP picked separate offensive and defensive All-American teams.
- CP = Central Press Association – In 1964, the Central Press picked a single All-American team of eleven players rather than selecting separate offensive and defensive teams. Selections were made by the captains of college football teams.
- FWAA = Football Writers Association of America. The Writers team was composed of an offensive and defensive unit.
- NEA = Newspaper Enterprise Association – In 1964, the NEA picked separate offensive and defensive All-American teams.
- UPI = United Press International – In 1964, the UP picked a single All-American team of eleven players rather than selecting separate offensive and defensive teams. Chosen "in a nationwide ballot of 259 sports writers and broadcasters".

=== Other selectors ===
- FN = The Football News, consisting of 33 players "selected by the Football News staff and a panel of its correspondents around the country"
- SN = Sporting News. They chose a two-platoon team—offense and defense.
- Time = Time, the U.S. news magazine. Time chose an offensive and a defensive platoon.
- WC = Walter Camp Football Foundation. The Walter Camp team was composed of one 11-man team.

== See also ==
- 1964 All-Atlantic Coast Conference football team
- 1964 All-Big Eight Conference football team
- 1964 All-Big Ten Conference football team
- 1964 All-Pacific Coast football team
- 1964 All-SEC football team
- 1964 All-Southwest Conference football team
