= Apple Leisure Group =

American travel and hospitality conglomerate

- Type: Subsidiary
- Industry: Hospitality, Travel, Tourism
- Founded: 1969; 57 years ago
- Founder: Al Atkinson; John Mullen
- Headquarters: Newtown Square, Pennsylvania, United States
- Area served: United States; Canada; Mexico; Europe; Hispanic America
- Key people: Alejandro Zozaya (executive chairman); Alejandro Reynal (CEO); Javier Coll (executive vice president)
- Services: Resort Management; Brand Management; Tour operator; Travel agency; Destination management
- Revenue: $3 billion
- Number of employees: 25,000+
- Parent: Hyatt
- Subsidiaries: Apple Vacations; Travel Impressions; CheapCaribbean; AMResorts; Funjet Vacations; Blue Sky Tours Hawaii; BeachBound; Southwest Vacations; United Vacations; Unlimited Vacation Club; AMStar DMC; WorldStar DMC; Trisept Solutions
- Website: www.appleleisuregroup.com

ALG Vacations (ALGV), formerly known as Apple Leisure Group (ALG), is an American travel and hospitality conglomerate focused on packaged travel and resort/brand management in Mexico, the Caribbean, Hispanic America, Europe, and the Middle East. It was the parent corporation of the resort and brand management company AMResorts (now the Hyatt Inclusive Collection). ALGV also oversees fourteen subsidiaries, including tour operators Apple Vacations and Travel Impressions, online travel agency CheapCaribbean.com, and destination management company Amstar DMC. As of October 2019, ALG Vacations is also the largest seller of charter flights, providing transport to 3.2 million passengers annually from the United States to Mexico, the Dominican Republic, Jamaica, and the Caribbean.

== History ==
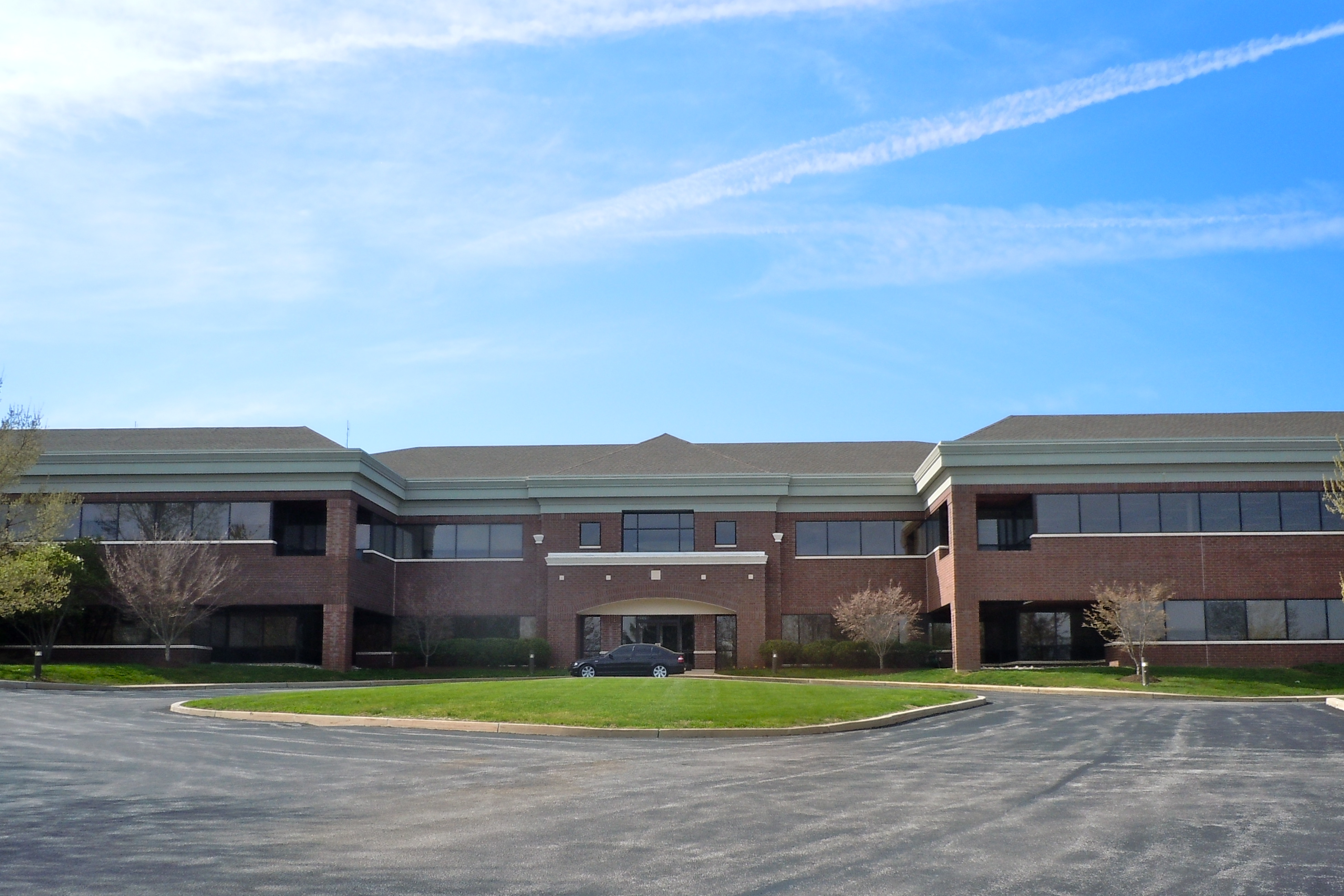
Apple Leisure Group headquarters in Newtown Square, Pennsylvania

ALG Vacations was founded in 1969 by John Mullen and his brother-in-law, Al Atkinson, as Atkinson & Mullen Travel. Mullen later became the sole proprietor and renamed the company Apple Vacations.

In 2001, Mullen's son-in-law Alejandro Zozaya, and future ALG CEO, founded resort sales, marketing, and brand management company AMResorts. Over a decade later, he spearheaded the effort to form ALG by making tour operator Apple Vacations a sister company of AMResorts. ALG received an influx of equity in late 2012 when it sold an undisclosed stake in its business to Boston-based global private equity firm Bain Capital. In 2013, Apple Leisure Group expanded with the acquisition of B2B tour operator Travel Impressions from American Express, of online leisure wholesaler CheapCaribbean.com, of destination management company Amstar DMC, and of AMResorts’ guest loyalty program, Unlimited Vacation Club.

In early 2017, Bain Capital sold its interest in Apple Leisure Group to private equity companies KSL Capital Partners and KKR for an undisclosed price. In May 2018, Apple Leisure Group merged with The Mark Travel Corporation and its associated brands Funjet Vacations and Trisept Solutions under the Apple Leisure Group name.

In November 2018, Apple Leisure Group announced an expansion into Europe alongside Groupo Inversor Hesperia (GIHSA), taking over operations of four of GIHSA's resorts in Spain. The following month Apple Leisure Group signed an agreement to purchase a majority share in Alua Hotels and Resorts, adding a further 12 resorts across Spain to its European portfolio. Citing increased growth in the European market, in March 2019 Apple Leisure Group named Javier Aguilla the President of the Europe Division. Aguilla had previous worked as the Founder and COO of Alua.

In 2019, ALG expanded further, adding 9,000 rooms to their portfolio over 23 different properties. This included a five-star adults-only resort, Secrets Mallorca, in the coastal town of Paguera, bringing over 100 jobs to the region. One more Secrets location is expected on the Caribbean island of St. Martin in 2020, along with a Dreams location in Punta Cana. Also in 2019, ALG named Alejandro Reynal as its CEO. Reynal succeeded the position from Zozaya, who remained the leader of ALG's board of directors. Reynal previously served as the CEO of customer relationship management conglomerate Atento.

In August 2021, Hyatt Hotels Corporation announced that it would be buying Apple Leisure Group for $2.7 billion in cash. The acquisition was completed on November 2, 2021. The Apple Leisure Group name was sunset and it now falls under Hyatt's Distribution Segment that also includes Trisept Solutions.

== Subsidiaries ==
The subsidiaries of ALG operate under the ALG Vacations (ALGV) umbrella. ALGV is a collection of vacations brands including Apple Vacations, Travel Impressions, Cheap Caribbean, Funjet Vacations, Blue Sky Tours, BeachBound, and United Vacations.

=== Travel Impressions ===
In 1967, Arnold Tolkin purchased a travel agency called ATS. Seven years later, Tolkin formed a group incentive and convention travel company out of ATS and named it Travel Impressions. In 1998, the Tolkin family, along with partner Ira Theodore, sold the tour operator to American Express. In April 2013, American Express and ALG announced an agreement under which ALG would acquire Travel Impressions and American Express’ international tour operator American Express Vacations International (AEVI). In the agreement, Travel Impressions would become the exclusive marketer and operator of American Express Vacations. American Express permitted their American Express Vacations branding to be used by Travel Impressions under license for a 3-year period post sale of the business. However, by 2017 the license agreement had expired and the program branding offered exclusively to American Express clients across Europe was changed to The Vacation Collection.

=== CheapCaribbean.com ===
Founded by Jim and Marta Hobbs and established in 2000, CheapCaribbean.com is an e-commerce vacation company providing beach travel to the Caribbean and Mexico. In August 2013, CheapCaribbean.com was acquired by Apple Leisure Group. The company continues to operate as a separate, wholly owned entity, with offices in Dallas, Phoenix, and Philadelphia. It was named one of Inc.'s "Top 5000 Fastest Growing Private Companies in America" in 2013.

=== Amstar DMC and Worldstar DMC ===
Amstar DMC has provided excursions in Mexico, Jamaica and the Dominican Republic since 1989. Its corporate headquarters are located in Cancún and Punta Cana. In 2008, Amstar became the first Mexican destination management company to open a representation office in Shanghai, China. Five years later, an office was opened in Hawaii through Amstar's sister company, Worldstar. In 2014, it commenced operation in Costa Rica.
