= Ike Kelley =

American football player (born 1944)

No. 51
- Position: Linebacker

Personal information
- Born: July 14, 1944 (age 82); Ludington, Michigan, U.S.
- Listed height: 5 ft 11 in (1.80 m)
- Listed weight: 225 lb (102 kg)

Career information
- High school: Bremen (Bremen, Ohio)
- College: Ohio State (1962–1965)
- NFL draft: 1966: 17th round, 249th overall pick

Career history
- Philadelphia Eagles (1966–1973)

Awards and highlights
- 2× First-team All-American (1964, 1965); 2× First-team All-Big Ten (1964, 1965)

Career NFL statistics
- Fumble recoveries: 4
- Interceptions: 1
- Stats at Pro Football Reference

Dwight Allen "Ike" Kelley (born July 14, 1944) is an American former professional football player who was a linebacker for five seasons with the Philadelphia Eagles of the National Football League (NFL). He was selected by the Eagles in the 17th round of the 1966 NFL draft after playing college football for the Ohio State Buckeyes.

== Early life ==
Dwight Allen Kelley was born on Ludington, Michigan. He attended Bremen High School in Bremen, Ohio, where he played six-man football.

== College career ==
Kelley was a member of the Ohio State Buckeyes of Ohio State University from 1962 to 1965 and a three-year letterman from 1963 to 1965. He did not miss a single game during his three years as a starter. He was a two time All-American and All-Big Ten selection in 1964 and 1965. Kelley was the first linebacker in school history to earn All-American honors. He was also a captain on the 1965 Ohio State Buckeyes football team. He was inducted into Ohio State's athletics hall of fame in 1983.

== Professional career ==
Kelley was selected by the Philadelphia Eagles in the 17th round, with the 249th overall pick, of the 1966 NFL draft. He was elected the team's special teams captain during his rookie year. The Eagles' special teams units were known as 'Kelley's Killers' during his tenure with the organization. He played in 67 games, starting seven, with the Eagles from 1966 to 1971. Kelley missed the entire 1968 and 1972 seasons due to knee injuries that required three surgeries total. He was released by the Eagles on July 25, 1973.

== Personal life ==
After his football career, he worked for Worthington Industries, a steel processing company, for 37 years before retiring in 2010.
