= 1964 Rose Bowl =

American college football game

- 50th Rose Bowl Game
Washington Huskies	Illinois Fighting Illini
(6–4)	(7–1–1)
7	17
Head coach: Jim Owens	Head coach: Pete Elliott
Coaches 15	AP / Coaches; 3 / 4
	1	2	3	4	Total
Washington	0	7	0	0	7
Illinois	0	3	7	7	17
- Date: January 1, 1964
- Season: 1963
- Stadium: Rose Bowl Stadium
- Location: Pasadena, California
- Player of the Game: Jim Grabowski
- Favorite: Illinois by 6 points
- Referee: Mike Delaney (Big Ten) (split crew: Big Ten, AAWU)
- Attendance: 96,957

United States TV coverage
- Network: NBC
- Nielsen ratings: 34.6

The 1964 Rose Bowl was the 50th Rose Bowl Game, played on January 1, 1964. It featured the Illinois Fighting Illini and the Washington Huskies.

Illinois was led by co-captains Dick Butkus and George Donnelly, Jim Grabowski, Lynn Stewart, and Archie Sutton on their way to a 17–7 victory over the Huskies, led by Junior Coffey.

The game was scoreless until the second quarter; Washington scored first, following an Illinois fumble at its own 27-yard line. Backup quarterback, Bill Siler, kept it for three yards, then passed it to Joe Mancuso for 18 yards to the Illini 6. Siler then faked a pass and pitched to halfback Dave Kopay, who scored behind the block of halfback Ron Medved, with 8:26 left in the first half. The Illini got on the scoreboard with Jim Plankenhorn's field goal in the waning seconds of the second quarter and Washington led 7–3 at halftime.

In the third quarter, after George Donnelly's first interception of the game, Illinois took control as Jim Warren scored a touchdown for the Illini on a two-yard run.

In the fourth quarter, with Illinois up by a score of 10-7, Washington was driving downfield, trying to score a go-ahead and possible game-winning touchdown, but George Donnelly intercepted the ball on the 4-yard line and ran it back to the 15. Illinois capitalized on that momentum and moved the ball 85 yards, with Jim Grabowski scoring his second touchdown of the game to put Illinois ahead 17-7.

Sophomore Grabowski rushed for 125 yards and was named the game's Most Valuable Player. Butkus played both ways in this contest, both at center and linebacker. He recovered a fumble and had an interception (in addition to leading a defense that held Washington to only 59 yards rushing and 71 yards passing for the game).

== Aftermath ==
The opposing running backs were both drafted by the Green Bay Packers, Coffey in 1965, and Grabowski in 1966.
