= 1964 All-Big Ten Conference football team =

American college football all-star team

The 1964 All-Big Ten Conference football team consists of American football players chosen by various organizations for All-Big Ten Conference teams for the 1964 Big Ten Conference football season. The selectors for the 1964 season were the Associated Press (AP), based on a vote by media members, and the United Press International (UPI), based on a vote of the conference coaches. Players selected as first-team players by both the AP and UPI are designated in bold.

Michigan won the Big Ten Conference championship for the first time since 1950, defeated Oregon State in the 1965 Rose Bowl, and had five players who were selected as first-team honorees by either the AP or UPI. Two Michigan players were consensus first-team picks by the AP and UPI: quarterback Bob Timberlake and defensive tackle Bill Yearby. Timberlake also received both the Chic Harley Award as the college football player of the year and the Chicago Tribune Silver Football trophy as the most valuable player in the conference.

Ohio State finished in second place in the conference and had six players who were selected as first-team players by either the AP or UPI teams. Three of the Ohio State honorees were consensus picks by the AP and UPI: offensive guard Dan Poretta, linebacker Dwight "Ike" Kelly, and defensive back Arnie Chonko.

Nine players from teams other than Michigan and Ohio State received consensus All-Big Ten honors in 1964. They are: (1) Illinois linebacker, Dick Butkus, who was a consensus All-American and was named Sporting News College Football Player of the Year; (2) Illinois fullback and College Football Hall of Fame inductee Jim Grabowski; (3) Michigan State halfback Dick Gordon; (4) Iowa end Karl Noonan; (5) Indiana end Bill Malinchak; (6) Illinois' offensive tackle Archie Sutton; (7) Indiana guard Don Croftcheck; (8) Northwestern center Joe Cerne; (9) Purdue defensive tackle Jim Garcia; and (10) Illinois defensive back George Donnelly.

== Offensive selections ==
=== Quarterbacks ===
- **Bob Timberlake**, Michigan (AP-1 [halfback]; UPI-1)
- Gary Snook, Iowa (AP-1; UPI-2)

=== Halfbacks ===
- **Dick Gordon**, Michigan State (AP-1; UPI-1)
- Ron Smith, Wisconsin (UPI-2)
- Carl Ward, Michigan (UPI-2)

=== Fullbacks ===
- **Jim Grabowski**, Illinois (AP-1; UPI-1)

=== Ends ===
- **Karl Noonan**, Iowa (AP-1; UPI-1 [halfback])
- **Bill Malinchak**, Indiana (AP-1; UPI-1)
- Bob Hadrick, Purdue (UPI-1)
- John Henderson, Michigan (UPI-2)
- Jimmy Jones, Wisconsin (UPI-2)

=== Tackles ===
- **Archie Sutton**, Illinois (AP-1; UPI-1)
- Jim Davidson, Ohio State (UPI-1)
- Jerry Rush, Michigan State (AP-1; UPI-2)
- Karl Singer, Purdue (UPI-2)

=== Guards ===
- **Don Croftcheck**, Indiana (AP-1; UPI-1)
- **Dan Porretta**, Ohio State (AP-1; UPI-1)
- David Butler, Michigan (UPI-2)
- John Niland, Iowa (UPI-2)

=== Centers ===
- **Joe Cerne**, Northwestern (AP-1; UPI-1)
- Ed Flanagan, Purdue (UPI-2)

== Defensive selections ==
=== Ends ===
- Aaron Brown, Minnesota (AP-1; UPI-2)
- Harold Wells, Purdue (AP-1; UPI-2)
- Jim Conley, Michigan (UPI-1)
- Bill Spahr, Ohio State (UPI-1)

=== Tackles ===
- **Bill Yearby**, Michigan (AP-1; UPI-1)
- **Jim Garcia**, Purdue (AP-1; UPI-1)
- Ted Orazen, Ohio State (UPI-2)
- Jerry Shay, Purdue (UPI-2)

=== Linebackers ===
- **Dick Butkus**, Illinois (AP-1; UPI-1)
- **Ike Kelley**, Ohio State (AP-1; UPI-1)
- Tom Cecchini, Michigan (AP-1; UPI-2)
- Tom Bugel, Ohio State (UPI-1)
- Bill Minor, Illinois (UPI-2)
- Joe Pung, Minnesota (UPI-2)

=== Defensive backs ===
- **Arnie Chonko**, Ohio State (AP-1; UPI-1 [safety])
- **George Donnelly**, Illinois (AP-1; UPI-1)
- Kraig Lofquist, Minnesota (UPI-1)
- Charles Migyanka, Michigan State (UPI-1)
- Tom Nowatzke, Indiana (AP-1; UPI-2)
- Don Japinga, Michigan State (UPI-2)
- Herman Johnson, Michigan State (UPI-2)
- Mike Reid, Minnesota (UPI-2)
- Rich Volk, Michigan (UPI-2)

== Key ==
AP = Associated Press

UPI = United Press International, selected by vote of the conference coaches

Bold = Consensus first-team selection of both the AP and UPI

== See also ==
- 1964 College Football All-America Team
