= Bill Yearby =

American football player (1944–2010)

No. 88
- Position: Defensive end

Personal information
- Born: July 24, 1944; Birmingham, Alabama, U.S.
- Died: December 20, 2010 (aged 66)
- Listed height: 6 ft 3 in (1.91 m)
- Listed weight: 235 lb (107 kg)

Career information
- College: Michigan
- AFL draft: 1966: 1st round, 13th overall pick

Career history
- 1966: New York Jets

Awards and highlights
- Consensus All-American (1965); First-team All-American (1964); 2× First-team All-Big Ten (1964, 1965)
- Stats at Pro Football Reference

William M. Yearby (July 24, 1944 – December 20, 2010) was an American football player. He played college football as a defensive lineman at the University of Michigan from 1963 to 1965 and was selected as an All-American in 1964 and 1965. He played professional football for the New York Jets of the American Football League (AFL) in 1966.

== Early life ==
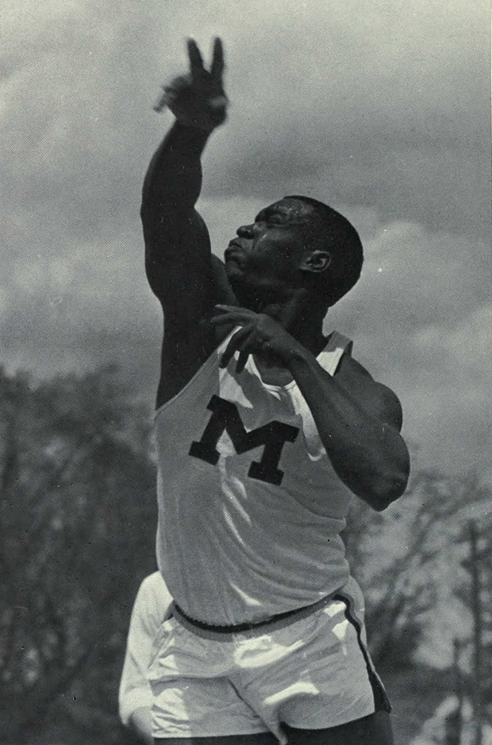
Yearby competes for Michigan's track and field team.

Yearby was born in Birmingham, Alabama, in 1944. He moved to Detroit as a child and attended Detroit's Eastern High School, where he was the Class A state champion in the shot put in 1962.

== University of Michigan ==
Yearby enrolled at the University of Michigan in 1962 and played college football for the Michigan Wolverines football team from 1963 to 1965. He was a member of the 1964 Michigan Wolverines football team that won the Big Ten Conference championship, played in the 1965 Rose Bowl, and was ranked #4 in the final AP Poll. He was selected by the Central Press Association, Football News, and Newspaper Enterprise Association as a first-team defensive tackle on the 1964 College Football All-America Team. As a senior, he was selected as a consensus All-American, and he was also named the Most Valuable Player on the 1965 Michigan Wolverines football team.

== Professional football ==
Yearby was selected in the first round of the 1966 AFL draft by the New York Jets. In December 1965, Time magazine described Yearby as "a vicious tackier, always on target, always gets his man — and not 5 yds. downfield, like most college kids." The following week, Time noted that "Jets Owner Sonny Werblin signed Michigan's 230-lb. Tackle Bill Yearby to a contract at $1,000 per pound." Yearby played only one season, 1966, for the Jets. The Jets' web site notes that Yearby "missed valuable training camp practice because of All-Star game and injury suffered in pre-season game," and that coaches at Michigan said he was "extremely quick" and could have been a starter on the Michigan basketball team.

A terrific athlete, Yearby was projected to play tight end for the Jets. In 1966, a bad knee limited him to spot appearances as a fill-in defensive end and special-teamer. In 1967, Yearby's knee was still not right, and he was farmed out to the Bridgeport Knights of the Atlantic Coast Conference, who were the Jets' minor league affiliate. While playing linebacker for the Knights, Yearby hurt his knee again, and his pro football career was over.

== Later life ==
Yearby died in 2010 at age 66.

== See also ==
- List of Michigan Wolverines football All-Americans
