= Karl Singer =

American football player (born 1943)

No. 68
- Positions: Tackle, guard

Personal information
- Born: October 12, 1943 (age 83); Warren, Ohio, U.S.
- Listed height: 6 ft 3 in (1.91 m)
- Listed weight: 250 lb (113 kg)

Career information
- High school: McKinley (Niles, Ohio)
- College: Purdue (1962–1965)
- NFL draft: 1966: 19th round, 289th overall pick
- AFL draft: 1966: 1st round, 3rd overall pick

Career history
- Boston Patriots (1966–1968)

Awards and highlights
- First-team All-American (1965); Third-team All-American (1964); First-team All-Big Ten (1965); Second-team All-Big Ten (1964)

Career AFL statistics
- Games played: 39
- Games started: 8
- Fumble recoveries: 2
- Stats at Pro Football Reference

Karl Kenneth Singer (born October 12, 1943) is an American former professional football player who played three seasons with the Boston Patriots of the American Football League (AFL). He was selected by the Patriots in the first round of the 1966 AFL draft after playing college football for the Purdue Boilermakers.

== Early life and college ==
Karl Kenneth Singer was born on October 12, 1943, in Warren, Ohio. He attended Niles McKinley High School in Niles, Ohio.

Singer was a member of the Purdue Boilermakers of Purdue University from 1962 to 1965. In 1964, he earned United Press International (UPI) second-team All-Big Ten and Newspaper Enterprise Association third-team All-American honors. In 1965, he was named first-team All-Big Ten by both the Associated Press (AP) and UPI, and a first-team All-American by the AP.

== Professional career ==
Singer was selected by the Boston Patriots in the 1st round, with the 3rd overall pick, of the 1966 AFL draft and by the Cleveland Browns in the 19th round, with the 289th overall pick, of the 1966 NFL draft. He chose to sign with the Patriots. Although drafted as a tackle, he was moved to guard in August 1969. He played in all 14 games, starting two, for the Patriots during the 1966 season and returned one kick for 27 yards. Singer appeared in all 14 games for the second consecutive season, starting five, in 1967, totaling two kick returns for 29 yards, one fumble, and two fumble recoveries. He played in 11 games, starting one, in 1968. He was released by the Patriots on August 12, 1969.

== Coaching career ==
After leaving the NFL, Singer became a tight end coach at the University of Cincinnati.
