= Paul Martha =

American football player (1942–2023)

No. 20, 47
- Positions: Safety, Wide receiver, Halfback

Personal information
- Born: June 22, 1942; Pittsburgh, Pennsylvania, U.S.
- Died: February 4, 2023 (aged 80); Pittsburgh, Pennsylvania, U.S.
- Listed height: 6 ft 0 in (1.83 m)
- Listed weight: 187 lb (85 kg)

Career information
- High school: Shady Side Academy
- College: Pittsburgh
- NFL draft: 1964: 1st round, 10th overall pick
- AFL draft: 1964: 9th round, 69th overall pick

Career history
- Pittsburgh Steelers (1964–1969); Denver Broncos (1970)

Awards and highlights
- Consensus All-American (1963); 2× First-team All-East (1962, 1963)

Career NFL statistics
- Interceptions: 21
- Fumble recoveries: 9
- Receptions: 17
- Receiving yards: 316
- Rushing yards: 15
- Rushing average: 2.5
- Total touchdowns: 1
- Stats at Pro Football Reference

John Paul Martha (June 22, 1942 – February 4, 2023) was an American professional football player who was a safety for seven seasons in the National Football League (NFL). He later entered the practice of law.

== Early life ==
Martha played high school athletics at Shady Side Academy in Pittsburgh, where he was a star quarterback, graduating in 1960.

== College career ==
Martha played college football and basketball at the University of Pittsburgh. After playing quarterback in 1961, he moved to running back, where he became a consensus All-American in his second season at the new position. In 1962, he led Pitt in both receiving and scoring. He led the Panthers to a 9–1 record as a senior in 1963, and after the season he played in the East-West Shrine Game, the Hula Bowl and the College All-Star game.

== NFL career ==
Martha was selected in the first round (10th overall) of the 1964 NFL draft by his hometown Pittsburgh Steelers.

In his rookie season of 1964, Martha caught six passes for 145 yards (a 24.2 average) and rushed four times for 12 yards. He also returned 13 punts and one kick. In 1965, he caught 11 passes for 171 yards (a 15.5 average) and rushed two times for three yards. He spent the next four seasons as a full-time safety on defense, and in those four seasons he recorded a total of 15 interceptions.

After the 1969 season, his sixth and last one in Pittsburgh, he played for the Denver Broncos in 1970, picking off a career-high six passes for 99 return yards.

== Post-NFL career ==
During his time playing for the Steelers, Martha attended Duquesne University, from which he earned a law degree. He became an attorney and worked for the Reed, Smith, Shaw and McClay law firm in Pittsburgh and for Youngstown Steel before hooking up with Edward J. DeBartolo Sr., the Youngstown shopping mall magnate, in the mid-1970s. He rose in prominence with DeBartolo's sports teams, becoming executive vice president, general counsel and CEO of the Pittsburgh Penguins in 1977 and executive vice president and general counsel of the San Francisco 49ers in 1978. He also ran the Civic Arena, prior name of the Mellon Arena. In the early 1980s, he was general manager of the Pittsburgh Maulers of the USFL. He was involved in mediating between the NFL players union and NFL owners on different occasions.

== Personal life and death ==
Martha lived in a retirement community in Valencia, Pennsylvania. He had three sons and six grandchildren. In 2010, he returned to Pittsburgh to attend a Paul Martha Tribute Luncheon attended by 140 people.

Martha was married twice, to Roxanne Martha and then to Bobbie Martha-Smith. Paul Martha died in Pittsburgh on February 4, 2023, at the age of 80.
