= Ed Adamchik =

American football player (born 1941)

No. 61, 67
- Positions: Center, Guard

Personal information
- Born: November 2, 1941 (age 85); Johnstown, Pennsylvania, U.S.
- Listed height: 6 ft 2 in (1.88 m)
- Listed weight: 235 lb (107 kg)

Career information
- High school: Greater Johnstown
- College: Pittsburgh
- NFL draft: 1963: 12th round, 166th overall pick
- AFL draft: 1963: 21st round, 164th overall pick

Career history
- Pittsburgh Steelers (1965); New York Giants (1965)

Awards and highlights
- Second-team All-American (1963); First-team All-East (1963)

Career NFL statistics
- Games played: 4
- Games started: 1
- Stats at Pro Football Reference

Edward James Adamchik (born November 2, 1941) is an American former professional football player who was an offensive lineman in the National Football League (NFL). He played college football for the Pittsburgh Panthers.
