= George Donnelly (American football) =

American football player (1942–2022)

No. 20
- Position: Safety

Personal information
- Born: September 4, 1942; Chicago, Illinois, U.S.
- Died: November 22, 2022 (aged 80); Wheaton, Illinois, U.S.
- Listed height: 6 ft 3 in (1.91 m)
- Listed weight: 210 lb (95 kg)

Career information
- High school: DeKalb (DeKalb, Illinois)
- College: Illinois (1961-1964)
- NFL draft: 1965: 1st round, 13th overall pick
- AFL draft: 1965: 4th round, 25th overall pick

Career history
- San Francisco 49ers (1965–1967); Westchester Bulls (1968); Chicago Bears (1969)*
- * Offseason or practice squad member only

Awards and highlights
- Third-team All-American (1964); First-team All-Big Ten (1964)

Career NFL statistics
- Interceptions: 2
- Fumble recoveries: 1
- Sacks: 1
- Stats at Pro Football Reference

George Donnelly (September 4, 1942 – November 22, 2022) was an American professional football player who played defensive back for three seasons for the San Francisco 49ers. At the University of Illinois, he and Dick Butkus were co-captains for the 1963 season, and Donnelly tied the NCAA record of 8 interceptions in one season.

Illinois played in the 50th Rose Bowl Game on January 1, 1964, against the Washington Huskies. Donnelly had two interceptions in this game, both setting up Illini touchdowns. The first came in the third quarter, allowing Illinois to score their first touchdown of the game. Then in the fourth quarter, with Illinois up by a score of 10-7, Washington was driving downfield, trying to score a go-ahead and possible game-winning touchdown, but Donnelly intercepted the ball on the 4-yard line and ran it back to the 15. This game-saving interception allowed Illinois to capitalize on that momentum and move the ball 85 yards, scoring their second touchdown of the game to put Illinois ahead 17-7.

Donnelly spent his years at the University of Illinois living in the Beta Theta Pi Fraternity House with 6 of his teammates; Doug Mills, David Cade, Robert Cravens, David Mueller, Bill Sullivan, and David Crouse.

Donnelly died on November 22, 2022, at the age of 80.
