= Harold Wells (American football) =

American football player (born 1938)

No. 53, 49
- Position: Linebacker

Personal information
- Born: November 26, 1938 (age 87); St. Louis, Missouri, U.S.
- Listed height: 6 ft 2 in (1.88 m)
- Listed weight: 220 lb (100 kg)

Career information
- High school: Sumner (St. Louis)
- College: Purdue (1960-1964)
- NFL draft: 1965: undrafted

Career history
- Philadelphia Eagles (1965–1968); Atlanta Falcons (1970)*; Pennsylvania Firebirds (1970)
- * Offseason or practice squad member only

Awards and highlights
- First-team All-American (1964); First-team All-Big Ten (1964)

Career NFL statistics
- Fumble recoveries: 6
- Interceptions: 4
- Touchdowns: 1
- Stats at Pro Football Reference

Harold Wells (born November 26, 1938) is an American former professional football player who was a linebacker for the Philadelphia Eagles of the National Football League (NFL). He played college football for the Purdue Boilermakers. While playing at defensive end for Purdue, he was selected by the Associated Press as a first-team player on the 1964 All-America football team.
