= Cosmo Iacavazzi =

American football player (born 1943)

No. 45
- Position: Halfback

Personal information
- Born: August 18, 1943 (age 83); Scranton, Pennsylvania, U.S.
- Listed height: 5 ft 11 in (1.80 m)
- Listed weight: 209 lb (95 kg)

Career information
- High school: West Scranton
- College: Princeton (1961-1964)
- NFL draft: 1965: 20th round, 275th overall pick

Career history

Playing
- Scranton Miners (1965); New York Jets (1965); Seattle Rangers (1967)

Coaching
- Scranton Miners (1965) Assistant coach

Awards and highlights
- First-team All-American (1964); Third-team All-American (1963); 2× First-team All-East (1963, 1964)
- Stats at Pro Football Reference
- College Football Hall of Fame

Cosmo Joseph Iacavazzi (some sources say Cosmo Iacovazzi, born August 18, 1943) is an American former professional football player for the New York Jets of the American Football League (AFL). A fullback, he played college football at Princeton University and was a member of the Tiger Inn eating club. He was inducted into the College Football Hall of Fame in 2002.

After graduating from Princeton, he was selected by the Minnesota Vikings in the 20th round of the 1965 NFL draft with the 275th overall pick. He played professionally in the AFL for the New York Jets in 1965; Iacavazzi was on the roster for two games. He also played for the Scranton Miners of the Atlantic Coast Football League (ACFL) in 1965 and the Seattle Rangers of the Continental Football League in 1967.

The street block in front of West Scranton High School was renamed Cosmo Iacavazzi Way before the 2005 football season.

Iacavazzi, the Princeton graduate, is the third "Cosmo" in the Iacavazzi family. Cosmo the first, was the graduate's grandfather, who had three sons. Peter, who was the graduate's father, and Cosmo Jr., the graduate's uncle. The Scranton Miner's team was owned by Cosmo Iacavazzi Jr. The family name, Iacavazzi, is spelled both Iacavazzi and Iacovazzi, depending which side of the family is using the name.

== See also ==
- List of American Football League players
- List of NCAA major college football yearly scoring leaders
