= Jim Garcia =

American football player (born 1944)

No. 70, 76, 80, 81
- Position: Defensive lineman

Personal information
- Born: March 7, 1944 (age 82); Chicago, Illinois, U.S.
- Listed height: 6 ft 4 in (1.93 m)
- Listed weight: 250 lb (113 kg)

Career information
- High school: Lane Tech (Chicago)
- College: Purdue (1961-1964)
- NFL draft: 1965: 2nd round, 17th overall pick
- AFL draft: 1965: 7th round, 49th overall pick

Career history
- Cleveland Browns (1965); New York Giants (1966); New Orleans Saints (1967); Atlanta Falcons (1968)

Awards and highlights
- Second-team All-American (1964); First-team All-Big Ten (1964)

Career NFL statistics
- Sacks: 1
- Stats at Pro Football Reference

James Ronald Garcia (March 7, 1944) is an American former professional football player who was a defensive lineman for four seasons in the National Football League (NFL) with the Cleveland Browns, New York Giants, New Orleans Saints, and Atlanta Falcons. He played college football for the Purdue Boilermakers.
