= Jim Whalen =

American football player (1943–2012)

No. 82, 83, 81
- Position: Tight end

Personal information
- Born: May 20, 1943; Cambridge, Massachusetts, U.S.
- Died: December 18, 2012 (aged 69); Gloucester, Massachusetts, U.S.
- Listed height: 6 ft 2 in (1.88 m)
- Listed weight: 210 lb (95 kg)

Career information
- High school: Cambridge Latin
- College: Boston College
- NFL draft: 1965: 4th round, 51st overall pick
- AFL draft: 1965: 3rd round, 23rd overall pick

Career history
- Boston Patriots (1965-1969); Denver Broncos (1970–1971); Philadelphia Eagles (1971)

Awards and highlights
- Boston Patriots All-1960s Team; First-team All-AFL (1968); Third-team All-American (1964); 2× First-team All-East (1963, 1964)

Career NFL/AFL statistics
- Receptions: 197
- Receiving yards: 3,155
- Touchdowns: 20
- Stats at Pro Football Reference

James Francis Whalen, Jr. (May 20, 1943 – December 18, 2012) was an American professional football player who was a tight end in the American Football League (AFL) and National Football League (NFL).

Whalen was born in Cambridge, Massachusetts. He played in the AFL for the Boston Patriots, and then in the NFL for the Denver Broncos and Philadelphia Eagles. Whalen played college football for the Boston College Eagles, where he was a two time first-team All-East selection and one time All-American. Whalen was selected in the third round of the 1965 AFL draft. He was also chosen in the fourth round of the 1965 NFL draft by the Minnesota Vikings.

Whalen is the only football player to have 3 TD receptions in a college game played at Boston College Alumni Stadium and have 3 TD receptions in a professional football game played at Boston College Alumni Stadium. Jim caught a team record 3 TD passes for the Boston Patriots in their 41–10 rout of the Miami Dolphins at BC on October 15, 1967. The Boston Red Sox were playing in the 1967 World Series and the Patriots had to play at Boston College for this game. Earlier in 1962 as a sophomore at Boston College, Whalen hauled in a team record three touchdown receptions in a victory against Boston University.

Whalen would become the first Patriots receiver to be accorded First-team All-Pro (1968). That same year he was voted as team MVP and would subsequently be selected as the tight end on the Patriots All-Decade Team (1960s).

== Early life ==
James Francis "Jim" Whalen, Jr., grew up in Cambridge, Massachusetts residing on Plymouth Street. He was the son of James Francis "Brud" Whalen and Helen Whalen, née Zukowski. He has one sister, Rosemary.

(Whalen's father was one of the preeminent multi-sport collegiate stars of his era, captaining the Manhattan College baseball and football teams in its sports heyday at the national level. In one of his seasons on the gridiron he averaged 9.1 yards per carry rushing, 12.7 yards per pass reception, and 45 yards per punt return and was among the leaders nationally in touchdowns scored. He was elected into the Manhattan College Athletic Hall of Fame in 1989.)

The younger Whalen was a three-sport star at Cambridge High and Latin, in Cambridge, Massachusetts, a school that also produced a number of other top athletes including MLB Hall-of-Fame pitcher and 342 game winner Tim Keefe, MLB player Eddie Waitkus on whom the movie The Natural was loosely based and Olympic high jumper John Thomas. Whalen, who starred in football, baseball and ice hockey, was subsequently inducted into the Cambridge Rindge and Latin Athletic Hall of Fame.

== College years ==
=== Overview ===
Whalen is considered one of the finest pass catchers and all-around athletes to graduate from Boston College. At the time of his graduation after the 1964 season, Whalen was the top pass receiver in Boston College history with 73 career receptions, surpassing the total of 70 accumulated by Art Graham, who like Whalen a few years later, would go on to a stellar career with the Boston Patriots. In addition to being one of the top ends in the country, Whalen was called upon to also punt his senior season. During his tenure at BC, Whalen also lettered in baseball and ice hockey in addition to football. The 1963, 1964 and 1965 BC Eagles hockey teams won the Beanpot Tournament while the 1963 and 1965 teams each reached the national Frozen Four.

Whalen was elected into the Boston College Varsity Club Hall of Fame in 1995.

=== 1962 season ===
Whalen started as a sophomore at Boston College recording 16 catches for 309 yards and a lofty 19.3 yards per reception. He was second on the team in touchdowns with six, trailing only Art Graham who scored seven. Boston College would finish with an 8–2 record including wins over Texas Tech, Vanderbilt and Houston.

=== 1963 season ===
Consensus First-team All-East selection as offensive end. Ranked first nationally in yards per catch (minimum of 25 catches) with an average of 20.1. His 523 receiving yards on 26 catches ranked eighth nationally, only 36 yards out of the fourth position. In addition to leading BC in receiving yards, Whalen also led in receptions. Boston College finished with a 6–3 record including wins over Virginia and Vanderbilt.

=== 1964 season ===
Accorded Third-team All-American and repeated as consensus First-team All-East. Joining Whalen at the offensive skill positions were Roger Staubach/Navy at QB, Milt Moran/UMass at end, and Jim Nance and Floyd Little, each of Syracuse, as backs. After the conclusion of the 1964 season, Whalen was selected as a starter in both the East – West Shrine Game (held in San Francisco), as well as the Senior Bowl (Mobile, Alabama).

Whalen recorded 31 catches and 398 receiving yards, leading the team in both categories. He was also one of three primary punters that season leading the squad with nearly 35 yards per kick.

Boston College finished 6–3 including wins over #9 ranked Syracuse and Cincinnati which would finish 8–2 that season. Against Air Force, Whalen's 4th down 30 yard touchdown reception on an Ed Foley pass snapped a 7–7 tie leading to a 13–7 win. Later that season, Whalen's 15 yard catch in the closing moments resulted in a 10–8 victory in Holy Cross coach Eddie Anderson's final game.

== Professional career ==
Unlike his father, who turned down offers from both professional football and Major League Baseball, the younger Whalen decided to take his athletic talents to the professional level. Although being recruited by teams from the National Hockey League as well as from others in Major League Baseball, Whalen chose football and signed with the hometown Boston Patriots who had drafted him with the 23rd overall pick. (Note: The younger Whalen was also drafted by the Minnesota Vikings.)

=== 1965 season ===
Recorded 22 catches and 381 receiving yards, each of which ranked eleventh among combined AFL and NFL tight ends. On October 24, 1965, Whalen recorded his first professional 100 yard receiving game (109 yards) against the Oakland Raiders. Patriots finish the season with a 4–8–2 record.

=== 1966 season ===
Recorded 29 catches for 502 receiving yards ranking ninth among all tight ends in the combined AFL and NFL. His four receiving touchdowns ranked first among AFL tight ends and fourth overall trailing only John Mackey, Jerry Smith and Pete Retzlaff. On November 13, 1966, Whalen scored his first professional touchdown on a 42-yard pass reception from Babe Parilli in a 27–21 win over the Houston Oilers. He would then proceed to score three more touchdowns over the next five games.

The First-team All-Pro tight ends in 1966 were Fred Arbanas (22 catches, 305 yards and 4 touchdowns) and John Mackey (50, 829 and 9).

Patriots finish 8–4–2.

=== 1967 season ===
Recorded 39 catches for 651 yards, each ranking seventh among combined AFL and NFL tight ends. His five receiving touchdowns as a tight end ranked second in the AFL and fourth in the combined AFL and NFL. Whalen's 651 receiving yards was tops among all Patriot receivers, ahead of the 606 recorded by WR Art Graham and 502 by RB Larry Garron, and his five receiving touchdowns also topped the squad.

On October 15, 1967, Whalen tied the Patriots record of three touchdowns in a single game during a 41–10 thrashing of the Miami Dolphins. The three receiving touchdowns while subsequently surpassed by WR Randy Moss on November 18, 2007, against Buffalo, is through the 2012 season still a Patriots record for tight ends.

The First-team All-Pro tight ends were Billy Cannon (32, 629 and 10) and John Mackey (55, 686 and 3).

Patriots finish 3–10–1.

=== 1968 season ===
Recorded 47 catches and seven touchdowns as a tight end, each leading the AFL and ranking second among all AFL and NFL tight ends (Jackie Smith led the NFL with 49 receptions). Whalen also piled up 718 receiving yards ranking second among AFL tight ends and fourth across the combined AFL and NFL. No other Patriot tallied more than 19 receptions or 331 yards receiving.

Whalen's 87-yard pass reception on a Tom Sherman pass (October 27, 1968) against the Super Bowl-bound (and winning) New York Jets was at the time the longest play from scrimmage in Patriots history. Through the 2012 season it still remains as the longest reception by a tight end in Patriots history, and also one of the longest by a tight end in professional football history.

On September 22, 1968, the Boston Patriots and New York Jets played the first professional football ever held in the state of Alabama. The Patriots at the time did not have a permanent home stadium and with a possible eye to relocation, played a "home game" at Legion Field in Birmingham, in part to capitalize on the popularity of Jets quarterback Joe Namath who played his college football at the University of Alabama. The Jets would go on to defeat the Patriots 47–31, despite Whalen's game-high 6 receptions (George Sauer led the Jets with 5 catches).

After a 20–17 victory against the Denver Broncos (September 29, 1968) in which Whalen caught four balls including one for a touchdown, he was awarded a game ball by his teammates. Ironically two years later, Whalen would be playing for the Broncos.

Had a career game high eight receptions against the Oakland Raiders on October 6, 1968. Also during the season, Whalen would have two multiple touchdown games in a pair of wins against the Buffalo Bills (October 20, 1968 with Mike Taliaferro at QB) and the Cincinnati Bengals (December 1, 1968 with Tom Sherman at QB).

It would be over 25 years until another Patriot tight end, Ben Coates, would exceed both Whalen's receptions per scheduled game and receiving yardage per scheduled game when the former combined with QB Drew Bledsoe in 1994 to set a new NFL record for tight ends. Additionally during the 1968 season, Whalen led the Patriots in both touchdowns and total yards from scrimmage (718). This was the first of only two seasons in Patriots history through 2012 that a tight end would lead the club in yards from scrimmage—the second coming in 1994 during Ben Coates record-setting season.

Whalen is named Patriots team MVP by the 1776 Booster's Club.

For his accomplishments in 1968, Whalen would be accorded First-team All-Pro, marking the first time that any Patriots receiver, tight end or otherwise, would be selected First-team All-Pro. The other All-Pro tight end that season was John Mackey (45, 644 and 5).

Patriots finish 4–10.

=== 1969 season ===
In a season during which he was battling influenza, Whalen recorded 16 receptions for 235 yards and a touchdown in a year in which no Patriot (running backs included) caught more than 29 balls. On September 28, 1969, in a loss against the Oakland Raiders, Whalen scores his last touchdown as a Patriot. After the season, Whalen was traded to the Denver Broncos for another tight end, Tom Beer, who would subsequently write a book entitled Sunday's Fools about his days in football.

Patriots finish 4–10.

=== 1970 season ===
In his first season as a Denver Bronco, Whalen records 36 receptions for 503 yards and three touchdowns ranking in the top ten in each category across all NFL tight ends. In a 24–10 victory over the Atlanta Falcons on October 18, 1970, Whalen scores his first touchdown as a Denver Bronco on an 8-yard pass from QB Pete Liske. A month later on November 22, 1970, Whalen scores his last NFL touchdown during a 31–6 win over the New Orleans Saints.

The First-team All-Pro tight end is Charlie Sanders who records 40 catches, 544 receiving yards and 6 touchdowns. Placing second in the All-Pro voting for tight ends that season is Bob Trumpy (29, 480 and 2).

=== 1971 season ===
As a Denver Bronco, Whalen pulled in a game-high 4 passes for 53 yards in a loss to the Green Bay Packers followed by 3 more catches, and a game-high 71 yards from scrimmage the next week (October 3) in a loss to the Kansas City Chiefs. However, during that game against the Chiefs, Whalen missed a block that resulted in the game-winning touchdown, and was abruptly released by the Broncos two days later. He was then picked up by the Philadelphia Eagles, for whom he hauled in a 41-yard pass against the Washington Redskins before retiring.

== NFL/AFL career statistics ==
Legend
**Bold**	Career high

Year	Team	Games		Receiving				
Year	Team	GP	GS	Rec	Yds	Avg	Lng	TD
1965	BOS	14	7	22	381	17.3	67	0
1966	BOS	14	8	29	502	17.3	45	4
1967	BOS	14	9	39	651	16.7	41	5
1968	BOS	14	13	**47**	**718**	15.3	**87**	**7**
1969	BOS	14	11	16	235	14.7	47	1
1970	DEN	14	13	36	503	14.0	34	3
1971	DEN	3	2	7	124	17.7	35	0
1971	PHI	2	2	1	41	**41.0**	41	0
		89	65	197	3,155	16.0	87	20

== Historical perspective ==
Despite playing his entire career during the shorter 14-game season and largely for teams that ranked at or near the bottom in passing, Whalen's accomplishments still compare favorably in today's offense-oriented game. He is one of only four Patriot tight ends (Russ Francis, Ben Coates and Rob Gronkowski) to string together three consecutive seasons of 500+ yards receiving (he had another with the Denver Broncos), and one of only three (Coates, Gronkowski) to record 650+ yards in back-to-back seasons. Additionally, Whalen's Patriot career yards per reception average of 16.3 ranks first among all Patriot tight ends and sixth all-time among all Patriot receivers, wide outs included (minimum of 150 career receptions). His career average of 16.0 per catch (inclusive of his time with the Denver Broncos and Philadelphia Eagles) as a tight end is outstanding and ranks in the top ten in the history of professional football (minimum of 150 receptions). Five of Whalen's 20 career touchdowns were for 40 or more yards. Whalen through 2013 still also holds Patriots tight end records for longest reception (87 yards), longest touchdown reception (87 yards) and most touchdown receptions in a single game.

Furthermore, Whalen protected the ball exceptionally well, fumbling just twice in his career. Through the end of the 2010 season, only one tight end in history (Andrew Glover) had fewer career fumbles than Whalen while catching as many passes.

Had a career game high of 134 yards receiving (against the Miami Dolphins in 1967), and is one of only five Patriot tight ends (Coates, Hasselbeck, Gronkowski and Hernandez) to record at least four career 100 yard receiving games.

Whalen's accomplishments also compare favorably to those of his peers during his time in professional football. The All AFL Hall-Of-Fame First-team All-1960's Team tight end is Fred Arbanas. Catching passes from Hall-Of-Fame quarterback Len Dawson, Arbanas caught 198 balls for 3,101 yards, a career 15.7 yards per catch average, 34 touchdowns while fumbling 4 times in 118 games. Whalen's career line is 197 catches for 3,155 yards, a career 16.0 yards per catch average, 20 touchdowns while fumbling twice in 89 games. During his career, Whalen caught touchdown passes from Babe Parilli, Don Trull, Mike Taliferro, Tom Sherman and Pete Liske. He also lined up with Steve Tensi, Alan Pastrana, Steve Ramsey and Don Horn in the quarterback position.

He was elected into the Patriots 1960s All-Decade Team.

== See also ==
- List of American Football League players
