= Joe Cerne =

Slovenian player of American football (born 1942)

No. 56
- Position: Center

Personal information
- Born: April 26, 1942 (age 84); Črnomelj, Slovenia
- Listed height: 6 ft 2 in (1.88 m)
- Listed weight: 240 lb (109 kg)

Career information
- High school: Bradford (Kenosha, Wisconsin, U.S.)
- College: Northwestern
- NFL draft: 1965: 2nd round, 16th overall pick
- AFL draft: 1965: 9th round, 69 (by the Kansas City Chiefs)th overall pick

Career history
- San Francisco 49ers (1965–1967); Atlanta Falcons (1968)

Awards and highlights
- Second-team All-American (1964); First-team All-Big Ten (1964)

Career NFL statistics
- Games played: 45
- Games started: 0
- Fumble recoveries: 1
- Stats at Pro Football Reference

Joseph Cerne (Slovene: Joe Černe) (born April 26, 1942) is a Slovenian former professional player of American football who was a center in the National Football League (NFL). He played four seasons for the San Francisco 49ers and the Atlanta Falcons. He is the first Slovene to play in the NFL. He was also called the best player in the league at his position.
