= Don Croftcheck =

American football player (born 1942)

No. 54, 61
- Positions: Guard, Linebacker

Personal information
- Born: September 12, 1942 (age 84); Allison, Pennsylvania, U.S.
- Listed height: 6 ft 2 in (1.88 m)
- Listed weight: 230 lb (104 kg)

Career information
- High school: Redstone (Republic, Pennsylvania)
- College: Indiana (1961–1964)
- NFL draft: 1965: 8th round, 105th overall pick
- AFL draft: 1965: 17th round, 133rd overall pick

Career history
- Washington Redskins (1965–1966); Chicago Bears (1967)

Awards and highlights
- Second-team All-American (1964); Third-team All-American (1963); First-team All-Big Ten (1964)

Career NFL statistics
- Games played: 35
- Games started: 13
- Fumble recoveries: 1
- Stats at Pro Football Reference

Donald Anthony Croftcheck (born September 12, 1942) is an American former professional football player who was an offensive lineman in the National Football League (NFL) for the Washington Redskins and the Chicago Bears. He played college football for the Indiana Hoosiers and was selected in the eighth round of the 1965 NFL draft. Croftcheck was also selected in the seventeenth round of the 1965 AFL draft by the Kansas City Chiefs.
