= Archie Roberts (American football) =

American football player (born 1942)

No. 16
- Position: Quarterback

Personal information
- Born: November 4, 1942 (age 84); Holyoke, Massachusetts, U.S.
- Listed height: 6 ft 0 in (1.83 m)
- Listed weight: 190 lb (86 kg)

Career information
- High school: Holyoke
- College: Columbia
- AFL draft: 1965: 7th round, 51st overall pick

Career history
- New York Jets (1965–1966)*; Miami Dolphins (1967)
- * Offseason or practice squad member only

Awards and highlights
- NFF Distinguished American Award (2011); Nils V. "Swede" Nelson Award (1964); First-team All-East (1964); Second-team All-East (1963)

Career AFL statistics
- Pass attempts: 10
- Pass completions: 5
- Completion percentage: 50%
- TD–INT: 0–1
- Passing yards: 11
- Passer rating: 16.7
- Stats at Pro Football Reference

Arthur James Roberts Jr. (born November 4, 1942) is an American retired cardiac surgeon and former collegiate and professional football player. First attracting the attention of recruiters, in his youth he was quarterback for an undefeated Holyoke High School football team and described by Sports Illustrated as the most widely courted high school football player in New England at that time. He went on to play at Columbia University. He was drafted in the seventh round of the 1965 American Football League (AFL) draft by the New York Jets. In 1967, he was traded to the AFL Miami Dolphins, playing only one game with the team, in the final minutes of a 41–0 loss.

Roberts subsequently became a cardiac surgeon after graduating from Case Western Reserve University School of Medicine. He performed over 4,000 open-heart operations before retiring. He founded the New Jersey–based Living Heart Foundation in 2001.

== See also ==
- List of American Football League players
