= Newspaper Enterprise Association NFL defensive player of the year =

American football award

From 1966 to 1998, the Newspaper Enterprise Association (NEA) annually awarded the George Halas Trophy to the most outstanding defensive player in the National Football League (NFL). The winner was released via the NEA news service and also appeared in the World Almanac, which was an NEA publication. It was considered one of the major awards and was included in the NFL Record and Fact Book and its winners appeared in the encyclopedia, Total Football II.

== Winners ==
Season	Player	Position	Team
1966	Larry Wilson	S	St. Louis
1967	Deacon Jones	DE	LA Rams
1968	Deacon Jones (2)	DE	LA Rams
1969	Dick Butkus	MLB	Chicago
1970	Dick Butkus (2)	MLB	Chicago
1971	Carl Eller	DE	Minnesota
1972	Joe Greene	DT	Pittsburgh
1973	Alan Page	DT	Minnesota
1974	Joe Greene (2)	DT	Pittsburgh
1975	Curley Culp	DT	Houston
1976	Jerry Sherk	DT	Cleveland
1977	Harvey Martin	DE	Dallas
1978	Randy Gradishar	ILB	Denver
1979	Lee Roy Selmon	DE	Tampa Bay
1980	Lester Hayes	CB	Oakland
1981	Joe Klecko	DE	NY Jets
1982	Mark Gastineau	DE	NY Jets
1983	Jack Lambert	MLB	Pittsburgh
1984	Mike Haynes	CB	LA Raiders
1985	Howie Long; Andre Tippett	DE; OLB	LA Raiders; New England
1986	Lawrence Taylor	OLB	NY Giants
1987	Reggie White	DE	Philadelphia
1988	Mike Singletary	MLB	Chicago
1989	Tim Harris	OLB	Green Bay
1990	Bruce Smith	DE	Buffalo
1991	Pat Swilling	OLB	New Orleans
1992	Junior Seau	LB	San Diego
1993	Bruce Smith	DE	Buffalo
1994	Deion Sanders	CB	San Francisco
1995	Bryce Paup	OLB	Buffalo
1996	Kevin Greene	OLB	Carolina
1997	Dana Stubblefield	DT	San Francisco
1998	Reggie White	DE	Green Bay

== See also ==
- Newspaper Enterprise Association § NFL awards
