= Roger Staubach =

American football player and Navy officer (born 1942)

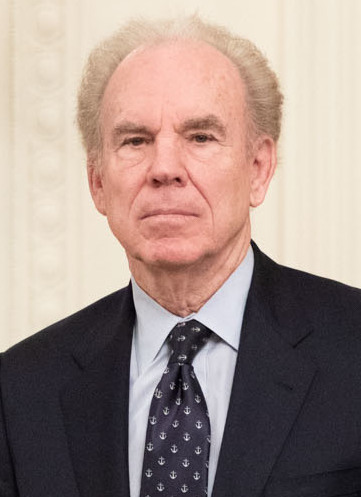
- Staubach in 2018

No. 12
- Position: Quarterback

Personal information
- Born: February 5, 1942 (age 84); Cincinnati, Ohio, U.S.
- Listed height: 6 ft 3 in (1.91 m)
- Listed weight: 197 lb (89 kg)

Career information
- High school: Purcell Marian (Cincinnati)
- College: NMMI (1960); Navy (1961–1964)
- NFL draft: 1964: 10th round, 129th overall pick
- AFL draft: 1964: 16th round, 122nd overall pick

Career history
- Dallas Cowboys (1969–1979)

Awards and highlights
- 2× Super Bowl champion (VI, XII); Super Bowl MVP (VI); NFL Man of the Year (1978); Second-team All-Pro (1971); 6× Pro Bowl (1971, 1975–1979); NFL passing touchdowns leader (1973); 4× NFL passer rating leader (1971, 1973, 1978, 1979); NFL 1970s All-Decade Team; NFL 100th Anniversary All-Time Team; Dallas Cowboys Ring of Honor; Heisman Trophy (1963); Unanimous All-American (1963); NCAA completion percentage leader (1963); 2× First-team All-East (1963, 1964); Second-team All-East (1962); Navy Midshipmen No. 12 retired; Misc.: Presidential Medal of Freedom (2018); Theodore Roosevelt Award (2000)

Career NFL statistics
- Passing attempts: 2,958
- Passing completions: 1,685
- Completion percentage: 57.0%
- TD–INT: 153–109
- Passing yards: 22,700
- Passer rating: 83.4
- Rushing yards: 2,264
- Rushing touchdowns: 20
- Military career
- Allegiance: United States
- Branch: United States Navy
- Service years: 1965–1969
- Rank: Lieutenant
- Unit: Navy Supply Corps
- Conflicts: Vietnam War
- Stats at Pro Football Reference
- Pro Football Hall of Fame
- College Football Hall of Fame

Roger Thomas Staubach (/stɔːbɑːk/, -/bæk/; STAW-bahk, -back; born February 5, 1942), nicknamed "Roger the Dodger", "Captain America", and "Captain Comeback", is an American former professional football quarterback who played in the National Football League (NFL) for 11 seasons with the Dallas Cowboys. He attended the U.S. Naval Academy, where he played college football for the Navy Midshipmen and won the 1963 Heisman Trophy. After graduation, he served in the U.S. Navy, including a tour of duty in Vietnam.

Staubach joined the Dallas Cowboys in 1969, becoming the team's second major franchise quarterback after the retirement of Don Meredith in 1968. Staubach played with the Cowboys during his entire career. He led the team to the Super Bowl five times, four as the starting quarterback. He led the Cowboys to victories in Super Bowl VI and Super Bowl XII. Staubach was named Most Valuable Player of Super Bowl VI, becoming the first of four players to win both the Heisman Trophy and Super Bowl MVP, along with Jim Plunkett, Marcus Allen, and Desmond Howard. He was named to the Pro Bowl six times during his 11-year NFL career. Staubach is one of ten players to both win the Heisman Trophy and be elected to the Pro Football Hall of Fame, and the only quarterback.

Upon his retirement Staubach founded The Staubach Group, a commercial real estate firm that he later sold to Jones Lang LaSalle for $613 million in 2008. He then became executive chairman of the Americas region of Jones Lang LaSalle until his retirement in 2018. That same year, he received a Presidential Medal of Freedom.

== Early life ==
Staubach was born in Cincinnati, Ohio, the only child of Elizabeth (née Smyth) and Robert Staubach. His father was a shoe and leather salesman and his mother worked as a secretary for General Motors. He is of partial German descent, and grew up in Silverton, a northeastern suburb of Cincinnati. He was a Boy Scout as a youth, attended St. John the Evangelist Catholic School, and graduated from the Catholic high school Purcell High School in Cincinnati (now named Purcell Marian High School) in 1960.

== U.S. Naval Academy ==
To prepare for his naval career, Staubach spent a year at New Mexico Military Institute in Roswell, where he set a school record for passing yards and scored 18 total touchdowns. Appointed by US Representative Donald D. Clancy, Staubach entered the U.S. Naval Academy in 1961 and played quarterback for the Midshipmen. As a third-class midshipman (sophomore) in 1962, he got his first opportunity to play, in the first game of the season, against Penn State.

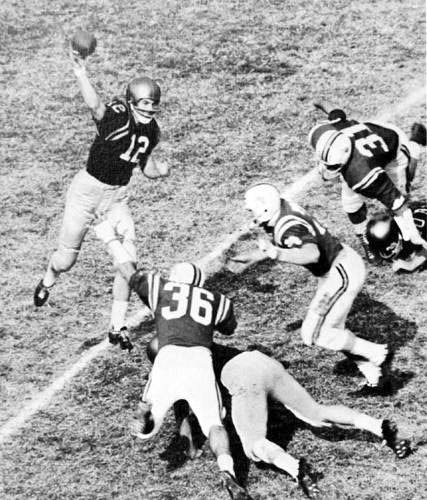
Staubach tossing a pass against Maryland during his tenure with Navy

A week later, playing against Cornell University, with the offense failing, coach Wayne Hardin decided to put Staubach into the game to see if he could improve the team's offense. He led Navy to six touchdowns, throwing for 99 yards and two touchdowns, while running for 88 yards and another score as Navy won 41–0.

A few weeks later, Staubach started again in the famous Army–Navy game. President John F. Kennedy attended the game, performing the coin toss. Staubach led the team to a 34–14 upset over Army, throwing for two touchdowns and running for another.

In his second class (junior) season of 1963, he led college football in completion percentage and won the Heisman Trophy, Maxwell Award, and the Walter Camp Memorial Trophy while leading the Midshipmen to a 9–1 regular season record and a final ranking of No. 2 in the nation. He appeared on the cover of Time in October; he would also have been on the cover of Life magazine's issue of November 29, 1963, but for the assassination of President Kennedy. Staubach and the Midshipmen won the 1963 Army–Navy Game.

On New Year's Day, the Midshipmen lost the national championship to the No. 1 team, the University of Texas, in the 1964 Cotton Bowl. Earlier that season, Staubach led Navy to a 35–14 road victory in its annual rivalry with Notre Dame. Navy did not beat Notre Dame again until 2007, 43 years later.

During three seasons at Navy, Staubach completed 292 of 463 passes with 18 touchdowns and 19 interceptions, while gaining a school-record 4,253 yards of total offense. Staubach is the last player from a military academy to win the Heisman Trophy. As a senior in 1964, he injured his left heel in the opening game victory over Penn State and missed the next four games, and Navy finished the season at 3–6–1.

The Naval Academy retired Staubach's jersey number (12) during his graduation ceremony after his senior season. In 1981, Staubach was enshrined in the College Football Hall of Fame. In 2007, Staubach was ranked No. 9 on ESPN's Top 25 Players In College Football History list.

After his collegiate football career ended, Staubach also concluded his time at the Academy with a standout baseball season in 1962, where he batted .420, served as captain of the baseball team in 1965, and played for the school's basketball team.

== U.S. Navy officer ==
During his junior year at the Naval Academy, Staubach's color blindness was detected and he was commissioned directly into the Supply Corps, which did not require being able to tell the difference between red (port) and green (starboard) lights or to discern the color differences in electrical circuitry.

After graduating from the Naval Academy in June 1965, Staubach could have requested an assignment in the United States, but he chose to volunteer for a one-year tour of duty in South Vietnam. He served as a Supply Corps officer for the Navy at the Chu Lai Base Area until 1967. Staubach supervised 41 enlisted men.

Staubach returned from South Vietnam in September 1967, and spent the rest of his naval career in the United States. He played football on various service teams to prepare for his future career in the National Football League. During his tour at the Naval Air Station Pensacola in Florida, he quarterbacked the Pensacola Navy Goshawks, a team consisting of fellow U.S. Navy officers, and played games against college football teams. He had access to the Dallas Cowboys playbook, and the Goshawks defeated many of the college teams they played against. Among his opponents was Youngstown State University, who had future actor Ed O'Neill on the defensive line.

== Professional career ==
Staubach was a tenth-round "future" selection in the 1964 NFL draft by the Cowboys. The NFL allowed the Cowboys to draft him one year before his college eligibility was over because he was four years out of high school, although due to his four-year military commitment, he would not play professionally until 1969 as a 27-year-old rookie. He was also drafted by the Kansas City Chiefs in the 16th round (122nd choice overall) of the 1964 American Football League draft, also with a future selection.

While still in the Navy during 1968, he went to the Cowboys' rookie camp, using most of his annual military leave. During 1969, Staubach resigned his naval commission just in time to join the Cowboys training camp. The Cowboys won their first NFC title in 1970 with Craig Morton starting at quarterback, but lost to the Baltimore Colts in Super Bowl V, losing by three points on a last-second field goal.

In 1971, Morton began the season as the starter, but after a loss to the New Orleans Saints, Staubach assumed the role. However, in a game against the Chicago Bears during the seventh week of the season, coach Tom Landry alternated Staubach and Morton on each play, sending in the quarterbacks with the play call from the sideline. Dallas gained almost 500 yards of offense but committed seven turnovers that resulted in a 23–19 loss to a mediocre Bears squad that dropped the Cowboys to 4–3 for the season, two games behind the Washington Redskins in the NFC East race.

Staubach assumed full-time quarterbacking duties in week eight with a victory over the St. Louis Cardinals and led the Cowboys to 10 consecutive victories, including their first Super Bowl victory, 24–3 over the Miami Dolphins in Super Bowl VI in January 1972. He was named the game's MVP, completing 12 out of 19 passes for 119 yards and two touchdowns and rushing for 18 yards. After the season, he negotiated his own contract, a three-year deal at about $75,000 per year.

In 1972, Staubach missed most of the season with a separated shoulder after a collision in an August preseason game. Even when he was ready to play late in the season, Landry went with Morton, who ultimately led Dallas to an 11–3 record where Staubach threw just twenty passes the whole season. However, he would relieve Morton in a divisional playoff game against the San Francisco 49ers that saw him go 12-for-20 for 174 yards and throw two touchdown passes in the last 90 seconds to turn a 15-point 4th quarter deficit into a 30–28 victory to send Dallas back to the NFC Championship Game. With that performance, he won back his regular job and did not relinquish it again during his career.

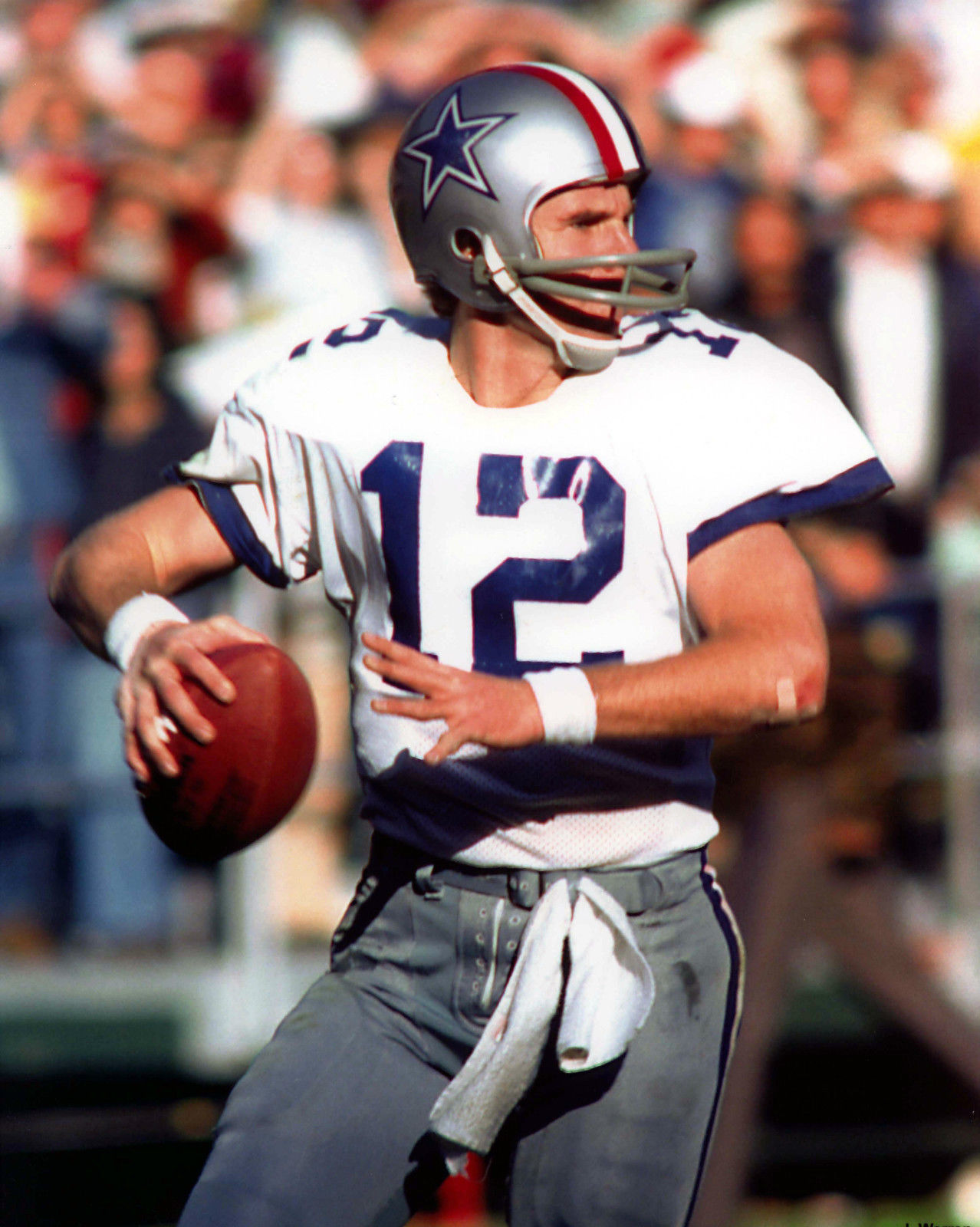
Staubach with the Cowboys in 1976

Staubach led the Cowboys to a second Super Bowl win in the 1977 season. He threw for 183 yards, a touchdown, and no interceptions in Dallas' 27–10 victory in Super Bowl XII over the Denver Broncos, led by his former teammate Morton. Staubach also led the Cowboys to appearances in Super Bowl X and Super Bowl XIII, where they lost to the Pittsburgh Steelers both times, by 4 points each game.

Staubach's offensive teammates included standout receivers "Bullet" Bob Hayes, Lance Alworth, Drew Pearson, and Golden Richards, tight ends Mike Ditka, Billy Joe Dupree, and Jackie Smith, tackle Rayfield Wright, and running backs Robert Newhouse, Calvin Hill, and Tony Dorsett. Dorsett, Hayes, Pearson, and Wright are in the Hall of Fame, as are Alworth, Ditka, and Smith (although those three were all with the Cowboys only at the end of their careers).

During his final NFL season in 1979, Staubach had career highs in completions (267), passing yards (3,586), and touchdown passes (27), with just 11 interceptions. He retired at the conclusion of the season in order to protect his long-term health, declining the Cowboys' offer for two more seasons. He suffered 20 concussions in his playing career, including six in which he said he was "knocked out". After suffering two concussions in 1979, a doctor at Cornell told Staubach that while his brain tests were fine at the moment, another concussion could have life-altering consequences. He chose to retire and was replaced as the Cowboys starting quarterback by Danny White.

Overall, Staubach finished his 11 NFL seasons with 1,685 completions for 22,700 yards, 153 touchdowns, and 109 interceptions. He also gained 2,264 rushing yards and scored 21 touchdowns on 410 carries. For regular-season games, he had a .750 winning percentage. Staubach recorded the highest passer rating in the NFL in four seasons (1971, 1973, 1978, 1979) and led the league with 23 touchdown passes in 1973. He was an All-NFC choice five times and selected to play in six Pro Bowls (1971, 1975–1979).

== Legacy ==
Staubach retired from football in March 1980 with the highest career passer rating in NFL history at the time, 83.4, and was voted into the Pro Football Hall of Fame in 1985. In 1999, he was ranked No. 29 on The Sporting News list of the 100 Greatest Football Players, the second-ranked Cowboy behind Bob Lilly.

Staubach was one of the most famous NFL players of the 1970s. Known as "Roger The Dodger" for his scrambling abilities, "Captain America" as quarterback of America's Team, and also as "Captain Comeback" for his fourth-quarter game-winning heroics, Staubach had a penchant for leading scoring drives which gave the Cowboys improbable victories. He led the Cowboys to 23 game-winning drives (15 comebacks) during the fourth quarter, with 17 of those in the final two minutes or in overtime.

Staubach's most famous moment was the "Hail Mary pass" in the 1975 playoff game against the Minnesota Vikings. With seconds on the clock and the Cowboys trailing 14–10, Staubach threw a 50-yard pass to wide receiver Drew Pearson, who caught the pass and strode into the end zone for a 17–14 victory. After the game, Staubach said he threw the ball and said a "Hail Mary". Since then, any last-second pass to the end zone in a desperate attempt to score a game-winning or tying touchdown is referred to as a "Hail Mary" pass.

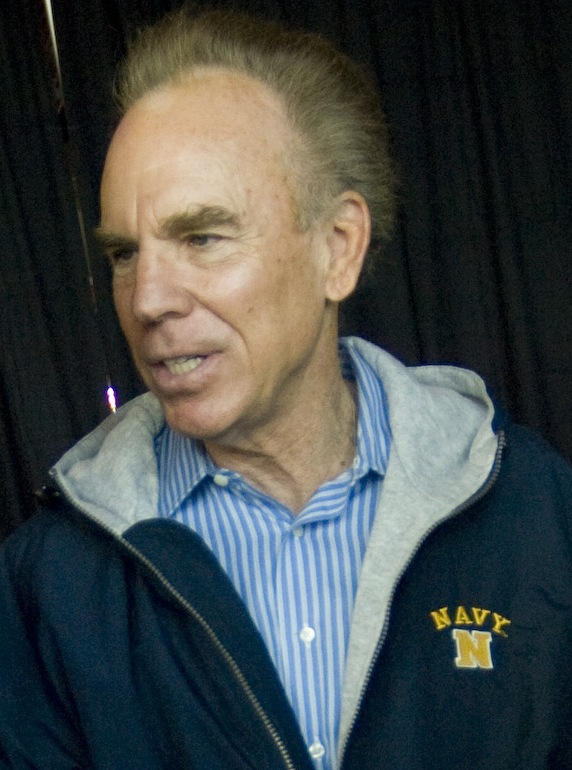
Staubach in December 2007

In 1976, Staubach received the Golden Plate Award of the American Academy of Achievement.

Staubach was named The Walter Camp "Man of the Year" in 1983, and was awarded the Davey O'Brien Legends Award in 2001.

On January 25, 2007, Staubach was named chairman of the North Texas Super Bowl XLV Bid Committee, whose goal was to have the Dallas–Fort Worth metroplex host the Super Bowl in 2011. On May 23, 2007, the NFL chose Dallas as the host city of Super Bowl XLV.

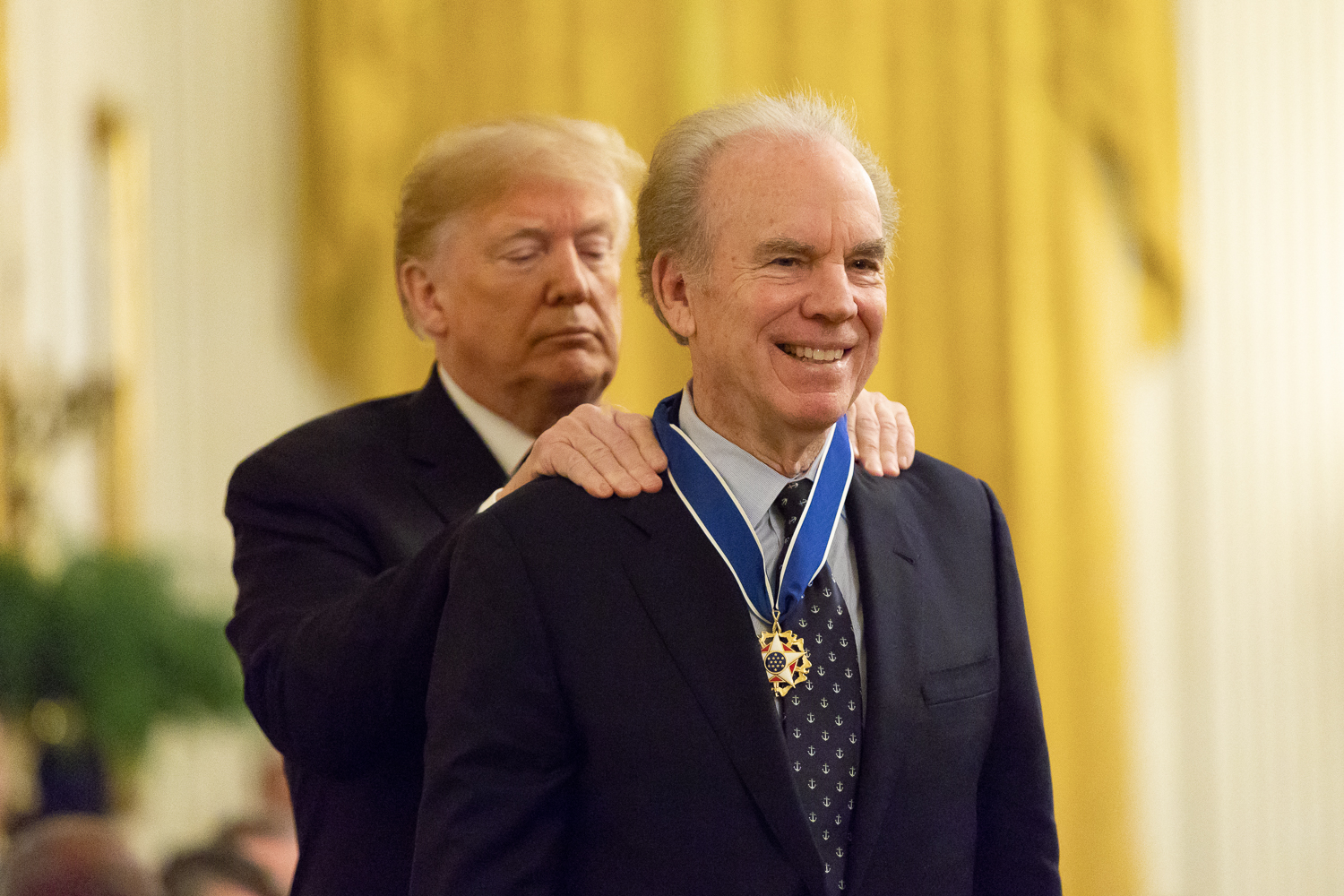
President Trump presents the Medal of Freedom to Staubach in 2018

In 2010, Staubach was named the No. 1 Dallas Cowboy of all time according to a poll conducted by the Dallas Morning News.

In November 2018, Donald Trump awarded the Presidential Medal of Freedom to Staubach and former Minnesota Vikings defensive tackle Alan Page.

On Friday, August 18, 2023, Staubach's alma mater, Purcell Marian High School in Cincinnati, Ohio, opened its new athletic complex, named Staubach Stadium in honor of Staubach.

== Career statistics ==
=== NFL ===
Legend
	Super Bowl MVP
	Won the Super Bowl
	Led the league
**Bold**	Career high

Regular season

Year	Team	Games			Passing									Rushing					Sacked		Fum
Year	Team	GP	GS	Record	Cmp	Att	Pct	Yds	Y/A	Lng	TD	Int	Rtg	Att	Yds	Y/A	Lng	TD	Sck	SckY	Fum
1969	DAL	6	1	1–0	23	47	48.9	421	**9.0**	75	1	2	69.5	15	60	4.0	19	1	12	106	2
1970	DAL	8	3	2–1	44	82	53.7	542	6.6	43	2	8	42.9	27	221	8.2	25	0	19	130	4
1971	DAL	13	10	10–0	126	211	59.7	1,882	8.9	85	15	4	**104.8**	41	**343**	**8.4**	31	2	23	175	6
1972	DAL	4	0	—	9	20	45.0	98	4.9	21	0	2	20.4	6	45	7.5	20	0	8	59	1
1973	DAL	14	14	10–4	179	286	**62.6**	2,428	8.5	53	23	15	94.6	46	250	5.4	18	3	43	269	5
1974	DAL	14	14	8–6	190	360	52.8	2,552	7.1	58	11	15	68.4	47	320	6.8	29	3	**45**	**309**	7
1975	DAL	13	13	9–4	198	348	56.9	2,666	7.7	62	17	**16**	78.5	**55**	316	5.7	17	**4**	36	213	5
1976	DAL	14	14	11–3	208	369	56.4	2,715	7.4	53	14	11	79.9	43	184	4.3	18	3	29	215	4
1977	DAL	14	14	**12–2**	210	361	58.2	2,720	7.3	67	18	9	87.0	51	171	3.4	**33**	3	30	219	**8**
1978	DAL	15	15	11–4	231	413	55.9	3,190	7.7	**91**	25	**16**	84.9	42	182	4.3	23	1	32	219	5
1979	DAL	16	16	11–5	**267**	**461**	57.9	**3,586**	7.8	75	**27**	11	92.3	37	172	4.6	20	0	36	240	**8**
Career		131	114	85–29	1,685	2,958	57.0	22,700	7.7	91	153	109	83.4	410	2,264	5.5	33	20	313	2,154	55

Postseason

Year	Team	Games			Passing									Rushing					Sacked		Fum
Year	Team	GP	GS	Record	Cmp	Att	Pct	Yds	Y/A	Lng	TD	Int	Rtg	Att	Yds	Y/A	Lng	TD	Sck	SckY	Fum
1969	DAL	1	0	—	4	5	**80.0**	44	**8.8**	22	1	0	**142.9**	3	22	7.3	12	0	0	0	0
1970	DAL	1	0	—	0	0	—	0	—	0	0	0	—	0	0	—	0	0	0	0	0
1971	DAL	3	3	**3–0**	31	51	60.8	321	6.3	30	3	0	98.6	15	75	5.0	12	0	10	64	1
1972	DAL	2	1	0–1	21	40	52.5	272	6.8	27	2	0	90.8	8	82	**10.3**	**29**	0	7	56	1
1973	DAL	2	2	1–1	18	37	48.6	269	7.3	**83**	2	**6**	51.4	9	60	6.7	12	0	10	**70**	1
1975	DAL	3	3	2–1	**48**	**79**	60.8	**670**	8.5	50	**7**	4	96.5	**19**	**100**	5.3	15	0	**12**	63	**5**
1976	DAL	1	1	0–1	15	37	40.5	150	4.1	22	0	3	19.0	2	8	4.0	9	0	4	24	0
1977	DAL	3	3	**3–0**	37	61	60.7	482	7.9	45	3	2	88.3	11	35	3.2	11	0	9	44	1
1978	DAL	3	3	2–1	37	72	51.4	459	6.4	39	5	3	77.3	8	47	5.9	18	0	8	69	1
1979	DAL	1	1	0–1	12	28	42.9	124	4.4	29	1	1	53.3	1	3	3.0	3	0	1	0	0
Career		20	17	11–6	223	410	54.4	2,791	6.8	83	24	19	76.0	76	432	5.7	29	0	61	390	10

Super Bowl

Year	SB	Team	Opp.	Passing								Result
Year	SB	Team	Opp.	Cmp	Att	Pct	Yds	Y/A	TD	Int	Rtg	Result
1971	VI	DAL	MIA	12	19	63.2	119	6.3	2	0	**115.9**	**W** 24−3
1975	X	DAL	PIT	15	24	62.5	204	**8.5**	2	**3**	77.8	L 21−17
1977	XII	DAL	DEN	**17**	25	**68.0**	183	7.3	1	0	102.6	**W** 27−10
1978	XIII	DAL	PIT	**17**	**30**	56.7	**228**	7.6	**3**	1	100.4	L 35−31
Career				61	98	62.2	734	7.5	8	4	95.4	W−L 2−2

=== College ===
Season	Passing						Rushing		
Season	Cmp	Att	Pct	Yds	TD	Int	Att	Yds	TD
1962	67	98	68.4	966	7	3	85	265	7
1963	107	161	66.5	1,474	7	6	156	418	8
1964	119	204	58.3	1,131	4	10	104	-1	2
Total	293	463	63.3	3,571	18	19	345	682	17

== Awards and honors ==
NFL

- 2× Super Bowl champion (VI, XII)
- Super Bowl MVP (VI)
- NFL Man of the Year (1978)
- Second-team All-Pro (1971)
- 6× Pro Bowl (1971, 1975–1979)
- NFL passing touchdowns leader (1973)
- 4× NFL passer rating leader (1971, 1973, 1978, 1979)
- NFL 1970s All-Decade Team
- NFL 100th Anniversary All-Time Team
- Bert Bell Award (1971)
- Joe F. Carr Trophy (1976)
- George Halas Award (1980)
- Lamar Hunt Award (2012)
- Dallas Cowboys Ring of Honor

College

- Heisman Trophy (1963)
- Maxwell Award (1963)
- Chic Harley Award (1963)
- UPI Player of the Year (1963)
- SN Player of the Year (1963)
- Walter Camp Memorial Trophy (1963)
- Unanimous All-American (1963)
- NCAA completion percentage leader (1963)
- 2× First-team All-East (1963, 1964)
- Second-team All-East (1962)
- Navy Midshipmen No. 12 retired

Misc.

- Presidential Medal of Freedom (2018)
- Theodore Roosevelt Award (2000)

== Personal life ==
=== Family life ===
Staubach married his wife Marianne on September 4, 1965. Together they had five children. He and Marianne reside in Dallas, Texas. As of 2017, they had 15 grandchildren and two great-grandchildren.

=== Real estate ===
In 1977, he started a commercial real estate business, The Staubach Company, in partnership with Robert Holloway Jr., an associate of Henry S. Miller. He had prepared by working in the off-seasons from 1970 until 1977 for the Henry S. Miller Company. Staubach began working with real estate because "I couldn't have retired at my age and just played golf. First of all, they didn't pay quarterbacks what they do today. And I was 37 with three kids. I kept thinking about [what would happen] if some linebacker takes off my head and I can't play anymore." He said "Henry Miller Jr. was a lot like [legendary Cowboys coach Tom] Landry. They both had similar haircuts ... they both had phenomenal integrity, great work ethic, and they could transfer their strengths to other people."

The Staubach Company has been his primary endeavor since retiring from football. The company first developed several office buildings; Holloway managed construction while Staubach found tenants. In 1982, Staubach bought out Holloway and shifted the company's emphasis from commercial development to representing corporate clients seeking to lease or buy space. This proved fortuitous, for a boom in Dallas office construction followed by a recession in the Texas oil industry left the city with excess office space, so companies representing tenants wielded greater influence. The company has worked with major businesses including AT&T, McDonald's Corporation, Hospital Corporation of America, and K Mart Corporation, and was also involved in residential development, with ownership stakes in 27 apartments and other real estate projects in the Dallas−Fort Worth area. Some of these were in partnership with Cowboys teammate Bob Breunig through S.B.C. Development Corporation, then a subsidiary of the Staubach Company. Others were collaborations with local developers and investors, including Ross Perot. He served as its chairman and CEO until June 20, 2007, when he announced he would resign as CEO of the multibillion-dollar real estate company he started 30 years earlier.

On July 11, 2008, The Staubach Company was sold to Jones Lang LaSalle for $613 million. Staubach and his children's trust would gross more than $100 million from the sale by 2013. The sale provided an initial payment of $9.27 per Staubach share with additional payments due during the ensuing five years for a total of approximately $29/share. Staubach took half of his first payment in a Jones Lang LaSalle stock which was then trading at approximately $59.50/share. He served as executive chairman of the Americas region of Jones Lang LaSalle until his retirement in 2018.

=== Other work ===
During the 1970s and early 1980s, he was a spokesperson for the men's clothing retailer Anderson-Little, appearing in both print and television advertisements. Later, he did television advertisements for Rolaids as well.

Staubach served as the president of the philanthropic organization No Greater Love in 1981.

During the early 1980s, Staubach worked briefly as a color commentator for CBS Sports' NFL telecasts. On November 9, 1980, during a close game between the New York Giants and Dallas Cowboys, Staubach broadcast a nostalgic comment by exclaiming he would like to be "right down there in the middle of it". The Cowboys lost 38–35.

Staubach jointly owned Hall of Fame Racing, a NASCAR Nextel Cup Series team, with fellow former Cowboy and hall-of-famer Troy Aikman, which began racing in the 2006 season.

In 2009, Staubach was honored with the "Lombardi Award of Excellence" from the Vince Lombardi Cancer Foundation. The award was created to honor coach Lombardi's legacy, and is awarded annually to an individual who exemplifies the "spirit" of the coach.

On December 27, 2011, Staubach wrote the foreword for a book titled The Power in a Link, published by John Wiley & Sons and authored by United States Military Academy graduate, David Gowel.
