= Al Atkinson =

American football player (born 1943)

No. 88, 62
- Position: Linebacker

Personal information
- Born: July 28, 1943 (age 83); Philadelphia, Pennsylvania, U.S.
- Listed height: 6 ft 2 in (1.88 m)
- Listed weight: 230 lb (104 kg)

Career information
- High school: Monsignor Bonner (Drexel Hill, Pennsylvania)
- College: Villanova
- NFL draft: 1965: 6th round, 84th overall pick
- AFL draft: 1965: 3rd round, 24th overall pick

Career history
- Buffalo Bills (1965)*; New York Jets (1965–1974)
- * Offseason or practice squad member only

Awards and highlights
- Super Bowl champion (III); AFL champion (1968); AFL All-Star (1968); First-team All-American (1964); First-team All-East (1964)

Career NFL/AFL statistics
- Interceptions: 21
- Fumble recoveries: 2
- Sacks: 7
- Stats at Pro Football Reference

Allen Edward Atkinson (born July 28, 1943) is an American former professional football player who was a linebacker in the American Football League (AFL) and the National Football League (NFL) with the New York Jets. He played college football for the Villanova Wildcats.

== Biography ==
Allen Edward Atkinson was born on July 28, 1943 in Philadelphia, Pennsylvania, to Allen and Mary Atkinson (née Connelly). He was one of seven children, having two brothers and four sisters. His father worked as a trolley operator for SEPTA. His brother, Bill Atkinson, became the first quadripalegic ordained to the Catholic priesthood in 1974, following a sledding accident a decade earlier. In 2017, Bill was named a Servant of God, the first step towards canonization.

Atkinson played high school ball at Monsignor Bonner High School. He played college football for the Villanova Wildcats as a two-way offensive and defensive tackle. Atkinson was selected by the Baltimore Colts in the 1965 NFL draft and the Buffalo Bills on the 1965 AFL draft; he chose the Bills, who had contacted him more often. In training camp, his position was changed to middle linebacker and he played two pre-season games before being waived by the Bills. He was then picked up by the New York Jets, alongside Ray Abruzzese, which worked in his favor as the Jets were closer to his hometown of Upper Darby, Pennsylvania. He played professionally in the AFL for the Jets from 1965 through 1969; then for the NFL Jets 1970 through 1974. He was a member of the Jets' 1968 World Championship team, and an AFL All-Star in 1968.

After his retirement from the NFL, Atkinson settled in Springfield, Pennsylvania. He first worked in travel agency, and formed Atkinson & Mullen Travel with his brother-in-law, before going into the car sales business. He was married to his wife Peg until her death in 2019; the couple had two children together.

== See also ==
- List of American Football League players
