= Jim Grabowski =

American football player and broadcaster (born 1944)

No. 33
- Position: Halfback

Personal information
- Born: September 9, 1944 (age 82); Chicago, Illinois, U.S.
- Listed height: 6 ft 2 in (1.88 m)
- Listed weight: 220 lb (100 kg)

Career information
- High school: Taft (Chicago)
- College: Illinois
- NFL draft: 1966: 1st round, 9th overall pick
- AFL draft: 1966: 1st round, 1st overall pick

Career history
- Green Bay Packers (1966–1970); Chicago Bears (1971)

Awards and highlights
- 2× Super Bowl champion (1966, 1967); 2× NFL champion (1966, 1967); Sporting News Player of the Year (1965); Consensus All-American (1965); First-team All-American (1964); Chicago Tribune Silver Football (1965); 2× First-team All-Big Ten (1964–1965); Second-team All-Big Ten (1963)

Career NFL statistics
- Rushing yards: 1,731
- Rushing average: 3.6
- Receptions: 82
- Receiving yards: 675
- Total touchdowns: 11
- Stats at Pro Football Reference
- College Football Hall of Fame

James Grabowski (born September 9, 1944) is an American former professional football player and broadcaster. He played as a running back in the National Football League (NFL), primarily with the Green Bay Packers.

Grabowski played college football for the Illinois Fighting Illini, earning consensus All-American honors in 1965. He was selected in the first round of the 1966 NFL draft with the ninth overall pick. Grabowski played in the NFL for Green Bay and the Chicago Bears, winning two Super Bowls with the Packers. He was an analyst on Illinois football radio broadcasts for nearly 30 years, retiring after the 2006 season.

== Collegiate playing career ==
Grabowski entered the University of Illinois in 1962, out of Taft High School in Chicago. At Illinois, Grabowski was a star running back, and was named Associated Press All-American in both 1964 and 1965. As a sophomore in 1963, Grabowski was named Most Valuable Player of the Rose Bowl, after leading the Fighting Illini to a 17–7 comeback victory over the Washington Huskies. Grabowski received many awards and recognitions after his senior season in 1965, including finishing third in the Heisman Trophy voting, being named The Sporting News co-player of the year and Back of the Year by the Washington Touchdown Club, and receiving the Chicago Tribune Silver Football as the Big Ten Conference Most Valuable Player. He finished as the all-time leader in rushing yards in Big Ten history. Grabowski was also an outstanding student at the University of Illinois, having been named GTE Academic All-American in 1964 and 1965, and graduated with a degree in finance in 1966.

Grabowski is a member of the College Football Hall of Fame, inducted in 1995. He was also inducted into the GTE Academic All-American Hall of Fame and the Rose Bowl Hall of Fame. Additionally, Grabowski was named to the University of Illinois "All-Century" team, and is a member of the National Polish-American Sports Hall of Fame.

- 1963: 141 carries for 616 yards and 7 TD. 3 catches for 21 yards.
- 1964: 186 carries for 1004 yards and 10 TD. 9 catches for 101 yards.
- 1965: 252 carries for 1258 yards and 7 TD. 3 catches for 22 yards.

== Professional playing career ==
Grabowski was selected in the first round of the 1966 NFL draft by the Green Bay Packers, with the ninth overall selection, held on November 27, 1965, only a week after his college playing career ended. (Grabowski was also taken as the first overall pick in the AFL draft, by the expansion Miami Dolphins.) Grabowski played five seasons for the Packers, and was known as one of Green Bay's "Gold Dust Twins" (along with fellow rookie running back Donny Anderson) in the late Sixties.

After he gained the starting position in 1967, a series of injuries hampered his career. He was the Packers' leading rusher in 1967 with 466 yards, while also catching 12 passes for 171 more, but a late-season injury forced him to miss the postseason, including their win in Super Bowl II. With a new head coach in 1971, Grabowski was waived by Green Bay in August, picked up by the Chicago Bears for the season, and retired in training camp in September 1972. Over his six seasons in the NFL, Grabowski rushed for 1,731 yards and scored 12 touchdowns: eight rushing, three receiving, and one after a fumble by Mel Renfro, which he returned for an 18-yard score in the 1966 NFL Championship Game versus the Dallas Cowboys.
