= 1963 All-Pacific Coast football team =

American all-star college football team

The 1963 All-Pacific Coast football team consists of American football players chosen by the Associated Press (AP) and the United Press International (UPI) as the best college football players by position in the Pacific Coast region during the 1965 NCAA University Division football season.

== Selections ==
=== Quarterbacks ===
- Craig Morton, California (AP-1 [back]; UPI-1 [quarterback])
- Bob Berry, Oregon (AP-2 [back]; UPI-3 [quarterback])
- Bill Douglas, Washington (UPI-2)

=== Halfbacks ===
- Mel Renfro, Oregon (AP-1 [back]; UPI-1 [halfback])
- Mike Garrett, USC (AP-2 [back]; UPI-1 [halfback])
- Willie Brown, USC (AP-1 [back]; UPI-2 [halfback])
- Clancy Williams, Washington State (AP-2; UPI-3 [halfback])
- David Kopay, Washington (AP-2)
- Tom Blanchfield, California (UPI-2 [halfback])
- Walter Roberts, San Jose State (UPI-3 [halfback])

=== Fullbacks ===
- Junior Coffey, Washington (AP-1 [back]; UPI-1 [fullback])
- Charlie Browning, Washington (UPI-2)
- Charlie Reed, Whitworth (UPI-3)

=== Ends ===
- Vern Burke, Oregon State (AP-1; UPI-1)
- Mel Profit, UCLA (AP-1; UPI-1)
- Frank Patitucci, Stanford (AP-2; UPI-2)
- Dick Imwaile, Oregon (AP-2; UPI-3)
- Gerry Shaw, Washington State (UPI-2)
- Neal Petties, San Diego State (UPI-3)

=== Tackles ===
- Mike Briggs, Washington (AP-1; UPI-1)
- Gary Kirner, USC (AP-1; UPI-1)
- Richard Koeper, Oregon State (AP-2; UPI-3)
- Glenn Baker, Washington State (AP-2)
- Larry Hansen, San Jose State (UPI-2)
- Al Hildebrand, Stanford (UPI-2)
- Ken Sugarman, Central Washington (UPI-3)

=== Guards ===
- Damon Bame, USC (AP-1; UPI-1)
- Rick Redman, Washington (AP-1; UPI-1)
- Rick Sortun, Washington (AP-2)
- John Walker, UCLA (AP-2)
- Walt Dathe, UCLA (UPI-2)
- Koll Hagen, Washington (UPI-2)
- Pete Dengeis, Linfield (UPI-3)
- Dave Wilcox, Oregon (UPI-3)

=== Centers ===
- Marv Harris, Stanford (AP-1; UPI-1)
- Larry Sagouspe, USC (AP-2; UPI-3)
- Jim Phillips, California (UPI-2)

== Key ==
Bold – first-team pick by both AP and UPI

AP = Associated Press, selected from the ballots of football writers from the Northwest to southern California.

UPI = United Press International

== See also ==
- 1963 College Football All-America Team
