= Rick Redman =

American football player (1943–2022)

No. 66, 55
- Positions: Linebacker, Punter

Personal information
- Born: March 7, 1943; Portland, Oregon, U.S.
- Died: September 30, 2022 (aged 79); Seattle, Washington, U.S.
- Listed height: 6 ft 1 in (1.85 m)
- Listed weight: 220 lb (100 kg)

Career information
- High school: Bishop Blanchet (Seattle, Washington)
- College: Washington
- NFL draft: 1965: 10th round, 132nd overall pick
- AFL draft: 1965: 5th round, 38th overall pick

Career history
- San Diego Chargers (1965-1973); Portland Storm (1974)

Awards and highlights
- AFL All-Star (1967); 2× Consensus All-American (1963, 1964); 3× First-team All-PCC (1962, 1963, 1964)

Career NFL/AFL statistics
- Interceptions: 9
- Fumble recoveries: 5
- Punts: 153
- Punting yards: 5,734
- Longest punt: 59
- Stats at Pro Football Reference
- College Football Hall of Fame

Richard Clark Redman (March 7, 1943 – September 30, 2022) was an American professional football player who was a linebacker with the San Diego Chargers for nine seasons, including five in the American Football League (AFL) and four in the National Football League (NFL). He played college football for the Washington Huskies and was inducted into the College Football Hall of Fame.

== Early life ==
Born in Portland, Oregon on March 7, 1943, Redman attended Bishop Blanchet High School in Seattle, Washington, graduating in the class of 1961. He played right guard and middle linebacker under football coach, Mickey Naish. During his junior year, however, he played fullback on offense. He also participated in basketball, track, and wrestling under coach, Bill Herber. Redman earned high school All-American honors in his senior season in 1960.

Redman enrolled at the University of Washington in Seattle and played college football as a guard and linebacker for the Washington Huskies under head coach Jim Owens. He was also the Huskies' punter. In his junior season in 1963, he led the Huskies to a Rose Bowl appearance. Redman was a two time All-American, and Academic All-American once. He was inducted into the Husky Hall of Fame in 1982 and the College Football Hall of Fame in 1995.

== Professional career ==
Redman was selected in the tenth round of the 1965 NFL draft by the Philadelphia Eagles and in the fifth round of the AFL draft by the San Diego Chargers. He signed with the Chargers to play linebacker and played with them for nine seasons, from 1965 to 1973. Redman was an AFL All-Star in 1967. In his first three seasons, he was also the Chargers' punter.

In the World Football League's inaugural 1974 season, he played with the Portland Storm.

== Personal life ==
After his football career, Redman went to work for Sellen Construction, which was owned by his stepfather. He ascended to become the chief executive officer.

Redman and his first wife, Elaine, had three children. He remarried to Jennifer.

Redman died on September 30, 2022.

== See also ==
- Other American Football League players
