= 1963 Pittsburgh Panthers football team =

American college football season

1963 Pittsburgh Panthers football
- Conference: Independent

Ranking
- Coaches: No. 3
- AP: No. 4
- Record: 9–1
- Head coach: John Michelosen (9th season)
- Home stadium: Pitt Stadium

1963 NCAA University Division independents football records
	Conf.			Overall
Team	W	L	T	W		L		T
No. 14 Memphis State		–		9	–	0	–	1
No. 3 Pittsburgh		–		9	–	1	–	0
No. 2 Navy		–		9	–	2	–	0
No. 12 Syracuse		–		8	–	2	–	0
Utah State		–		8	–	2	–	0
Oregon		–		8	–	3	–	0
No. 16 Penn State		–		7	–	3	–	0
Army		–		7	–	3	–	0
Air Force		–		7	–	4	–	0
Boston College		–		6	–	3	–	0
Buffalo		–		5	–	3	–	1
Southern Miss		–		5	–	3	–	1
Villanova		–		5	–	4	–	0
Oregon State		–		5	–	5	–	0
San Jose State		–		5	–	5	–	0
Xavier		–		5	–	4	–	1
West Texas State		–		4	–	4	–	1
Florida State		–		4	–	5	–	1
Colgate		–		3	–	4	–	1
New Mexico State		–		3	–	6	–	1
Colorado State		–		3	–	7	–	0
Miami (FL)		–		3	–	7	–	0
Texas Western		–		3	–	7	–	0
Detroit		–		2	–	6	–	1
Holy Cross		–		2	–	6	–	1
Notre Dame		–		2	–	7	–	0
Pacific (CA)		–		2	–	8	–	0
Houston		–		2	–	8	–	0
Boston University		–		1	–	6	–	1
Dayton		–		1	–	7	–	2
Rankings from Coaches Poll

The 1963 Pittsburgh Panthers football team represented the University of Pittsburgh as an independent during the 1963 NCAA University Division football season. Led by ninth-year head coach John Michelosen, the Panthers were 9–1 and were fourth in the final AP poll, third in the coaches poll. The team played its home games at Pitt Stadium in Pittsburgh.

The Panthers did not play in a bowl game; their most recent postseason appearance was in 1956 and the next was in 1973.

== Schedule ==
Date	Opponent	Rank	Site	Result	Attendance	Source
September 20	at UCLA		Los Angeles Memorial Coliseum; Los Angeles, CA	W 20–0	28,095	
September 28	Washington	No. 10	Pitt Stadium; Pittsburgh, PA	W 13–6	37,136	
October 5	California	No. 9	Pitt Stadium; Pittsburgh, PA	W 35–15	22,091	
October 19	at West Virginia	No. 3	Mountaineer Field; Morgantown, WV (Backyard Brawl)	W 13–10	31,000	
October 26	at No. 10 Navy	No. 3	Navy–Marine Corps Memorial Stadium; Annapolis, MD	L 12–24	30,231	
November 2	Syracuse^{†}	No. 10	Pitt Stadium; Pittsburgh, PA (rivalry)	W 35–27	44,217	
November 9	at Notre Dame	No. 8	Notre Dame Stadium; Notre Dame, IN (rivalry)	W 27–7	41,306	
November 16	Army	No. 6	Pitt Stadium; Pittsburgh, PA	W 28–0	47,947	
November 30	at Miami (FL)	No. 5	Miami Orange Bowl; Miami, FL	W 31–20	33,230	
December 7	Penn State	No. 4	Pitt Stadium; Pittsburgh, PA (rivalry)	W 22–21	52,349	
^{†}Homecoming; Rankings from AP Poll released prior to the game; Source:

- Opener at UCLA was played on Friday night.
- Following the assassination of President Kennedy, the Penn State game was postponed two weeks to December 7.

== Preseason ==
On March 25, Coach Michelosen welcomed 66 players, including 30 lettermen for his ninth spring practice session. The coaches were allotted 20 days of practice to be completed by April 27. The annual Blue-White game was played on that date at Pitt Stadium. The Blues managed an 8–0 victory with no time remaining on a 15-yard interception return by guard Ray Popp. The two point conversion was successful (a pass from Ray Conway to John Verkleeran).

On April 2, Pitt assistant line coach Frank Lauterbur was named head coach at Toledo University. On August 24, the Athletic Department announced the hiring of Joe Pullekines to replace Lauterbur. Pullekines previously coached as a graduate assistant for Pitt, while pursuing his dental degree.

A squad of 60 players, including 27 lettermen, were invited to fall camp at Allegheny College in Meadville, PA, commencing on August 19. The squad returned to campus on September 1 for class registration, and then practiced on campus for their opening game at UCLA on September 20.

== Game summaries ==
=== At UCLA ===
Week 1: Pitt at UCLA

Team	1	2	3	4	Total
• Pitt	7	10	3	0	20
UCLA	0-	0	0	0	0

- Date: September 20, 1963
- Location: Los Angeles Memorial Coliseum
  Los Angeles, CA
- Game start: 8:00 p.m.
- Game attendance: 28,095
- Game weather: warm
- Referee: David H. Buchanan

Scoring summary
1	PITT	Paul Martha 4-yard run (Rick Leeson kick)	PITT 7–0
2	PITT	Leeson 17-yard field goal	PITT 10–0
2	PITT	Leeson 1-yard run (Leeson kick)	PITT 17–0
3	PITT	Leeson 21-yard field goal	UPITT 20–0

Pitt opened their 1963 season with a trip to the West Coast to play the UCLA Bruins for the sixth time. Pitt led the all-time series 3–2. The Bruins returned 25 lettermen including All-American end candidate Mel Profit. Pitt followed their normal procedure of a stopover in Albuquerque, NM. Coach Michelosen held a team work-out on the University of New Mexico field, and then the squad proceeded to Los Angeles.

On September 20, Pitt defeated the UCLA Bruins 20–0 in front of 28,095 fans at the Memorial Coliseum in Los Angeles. Pitt kicked off and forced a punt. They gained possession on the UCLA 48-yard line. On the seventh play, Paul Martha ran over the right side for the score from the 4-yard line. Rick Leeson kicked the point after and Pitt led 7–0. Later in the quarter, UCLA intercepted a Fred Mazurek pass and returned it to the Panthers' 11-yard line. Pitt's defense held and the Panthers took over on their 9-yard line. UCLA did not threaten to score again. Rick Leeson scored 10 points in the second quarter on a 27-yard field goal, 1-yard plunge and extra point for a 17–0 halftime lead. Then, Leeson capped the scoring with a 31-yard field goal in the third quarter.

The Panthers gained 202 yards rushing and 227 yards passing. Halfback Eric Crabtree led the team with 44 rushing yards on 8 carries. Quarterback Fred Mazurek contributed 43 rushing yards on 7 carries and completed 8 of 11 passes for 106 yards. Kenny Lucas completed 4 of 8 passes for 70 yards and Fred Novak completed 4 of 7 passes for 51 yards.

The starting Pitt line-up for the game against UCLA was Al Grigaliunas (left end), John Maczuzak (left tackle), Jeff Ware (left guard), Charles Ahlborn (center), Ed Adamchik (right guard), Ernest Borghetti (right tackle), Joe Kuzneski (right end), Fred Mazurek (quarterback), Paul Martha (left halfback), Bill Bodle (right halfback) and Rick Leeson (fullback). Substitutes appearing in the game for Pitt were William Howley, Mitchell Zalansky, Ronald Linaburg, Tom Raymond, Ray Popp, Bernie LaQuinta, Joe Novogratz, Bob Guzinsky, Martin Schottenheimer, Paul Cercel, Fred Hoaglin, James Irwin, James Jones, Dennis Bernick, John Jenkins, John Verkleeren, Eugene Sobolewski, Kenny Lucas, Fred Novak, Tom Black, Glen Lehner, Dale Stewart, Eric Crabtree, Robert Roeder, John Ozimek, John Telesky and Barry McKnight.

Statistics	PITT	UCLA
First downs	27	6
Plays–yards	81–429	47–103
Rushes–yards	53–202	28–59
Passing yards	227	44
Passing: comp–att–int	16–28–2	4–19–1
Turnovers	2	2
Time of possession	na	na

Team	Category	Player	Statistics
PITT	Passing	Fred Mazurek	8/11, 106 yards, 1 int
PITT	Rushing	Eric Crabtree	8 carries, 44 yards
PITT	Receiving	Bill Bodle	4 receptions, 54 yards
UCLA	Passing	Steve Sindell	4/10, 91 yards, 1 int
UCLA	Rushing	Warren Jackson	10 carries, 37 yards
UCLA	Receiving	Kurt Altenberg	1 reception, 16 yards

=== Washington ===
Week 2: Washington at Pitt

Team	1	2	3	4	Total
Washington	0	0	0	6	6
• Pitt	0	7	0	6	13

- Date: September 28, 1963
- Location: Pitt Stadium
  Pittsburgh, PA
- Game start: 1:30 p.m.
- Game attendance: 37,136
- Game weather: warm and sunny
- Referee: Lee G. Elsan (West Coast)

Scoring summary
2	PITT	Fred Mazurek 1-yard run (Rick Leeson kick)	PITT 7–0
4	WASH	Dave Kopay 2-yard run (run failed)	PITT 7–6
4	PITT	Joe Kuzneski 14-yard pass from Mazurek (kick failed)	PITT 13–6

On September 28, the Panthers home opener was against the Washington Huskies. Coach Jim Owens' Huskies had 14 returning lettermen, and were led by All-American guard candidate Rick Redman. Pitt led the all-time series 3–1.

In front of 37,136 fans, the Panthers won their second game in a row by defeating the Huskies 13–6. Late in the first quarter, the Panthers started a 75-yard, 11 play drive that ended, on the fourth play of the second quarter, with quarterback Fred Mazurek scoring on a 1-yard sneak. Rick Leeson kicked the extra point for a 7–0 halftime lead. Washington threatened in the second quarter, but fumbled on the Panthers' 3-yard line. The Huskies scored in the final period on a 49-yard, 10-play drive. Dave Kopay scored from the 2-yard line. Fred Mazurek tackled Charley Browning in the backfield on the two point attempt to keep the Panthers in the lead 7–6. Pitt tackle Ernie Borghetti recovered the onside kick on the Panthers' 48-yard line. On the fifth play, Mazurek hit Joe Kuzneski with a 14-yard touchdown pass. Leeson missed the extra point. The Huskies Steve Bramwell returned the kick-off 70 yards to the Panthers 27-yard line. Mazurek intercepted a Bill Douglas pass which gave Pitt possession on their 13-yard line. The Panthers then drove to the Washington 1-yard line, and fumbled with 1 minute remaining.

Fred Mazurek ran 7 times for 21 yards and completed 11 of 16 passes for 117 yards. He also caught a pass for an 11 yard gain. Paul Martha (82 yards) and Rick Leeson (48 yards) led the team in rushing.

The Pitt starting line-up for the game against Washington was Al Grigaliunas (left end), John Maczuzak (left tackle), Jeff Ware (left guard), Charles Ahlborn (center), Ed Adamchik (right guard), Ernest Borghetti (right tackle), Joe Kuzneski (right end), Fred Mazurek (quarterback), Paul Martha (left halfback), Bill Bodle (right halfback) and Rick Leeson (fullback). Substitutes appearing in the game for Pitt were William Howley, Ronald Linaburg, Ray Popp, Bernie LaQuinta, Martin Schottenheimer, Paul Cercel, James Irwin, James Jones, John Jenkins, John Verkleeren, Eugene Sobolewski, Kenny Lucas, Tom Black, Glen Lehner, Dale Stewart, Eric Crabtree, Robert Roeder and John Telesky.

Statistics	WASH	PITT
First downs	13	23
Plays–yards	61–242	72–374
Rushes–yards	53–216	51–246
Passing yards	26	128
Passing: comp–att–int	2–8–1	12–21–2
Turnovers	4	4
Time of possession	na	na

Team	Category	Player	Statistics
WASH	Passing	Bill Douglas	2/7, 26 yards, 1 int
WASH	Rushing	Charlie Browning	9 carries, 83 yards
WASH	Receiving	Steve Bramwell	1 receptions, 16 yards
PITT	Passing	Fred Mazurek	11/16, 117 yards
PITT	Rushing	Paul Martha	12 carries, 82 yards
PITT	Receiving	Joe Kuzneski	3 receptions, 36 yards

=== California ===
Week 3: California at Pitt

Team	1	2	3	4	Total
California	7	0	0	8	15
• Pitt	15	7	6	7	35

- Date: October 5, 1963
- Location: Pitt Stadium
  Pittsburgh, PA
- Game start: 1:30 p.m.
- Game attendance: 22,091

Scoring summary
1	CAL	Jim Blakeney 85-yard kick-off return (Tom Blanchfield kick)	CAL 7–0
1	PITT	Paul Martha 1-yard run (Fred Mazurek run)	PITT 8–7
1	PITT	Eric Crabtree 47-yard run (Rick Leeson kick)	PITT 15–7
2	PITT	Crabtree 10-yard pass from Kenny Lucas (Leeson kick)	PITT 22–7
3	PITT	Leeson 32-yard pass from Fred Mazurek (kick failed)	PITT 28–7
4	PITT	Barry McKnight 14-yard run (Leeson kick)	PITT 35–7
4	CALT	Jack Schraub 14-yard pass from Craig Morton (Schraub pass from Morton)	PITT 35–15

On October 5, the Panthers played the California Bears (their third Athletic Association of Western Universities opponent) at Pitt Stadium. Coach Marv Levy's Bears were 1–1 on the season and a two touchdown underdog. Pitt led the all-time series 2–1.

Pitt made it three straight with a decisive 35–15 victory. Cal halfback Jim Blakeney took the opening kick-off 85 yards for the game's first score, and Tom Blanchfield's placement put Cal ahead 7–0. Pitt scored the next 35 points. Paul Martha completed a 10-play, 61-yard march with a 1-yard slant over left tackle. Fred Mazurek ran over the right side for the two point conversion to put Pitt ahead 8–7. Eric Crabtree scored 3 minutes later on a 47-yard reverse around the left side. Rick Leeson converted the first of his three placements to make the score 15–7. Crabtree caught a 10-yard touchdown pass from Kenny Lucas in the second quarter, and Leeson's placement made the halftime score 22–7. Leeson scored on a 32-yard pass from Mazurek in the third period. Barry McKnight closed the Panther scoring with a last quarter 14-yard run to cap a 14-play, 84-yard drive. Cal made the score more respectable against Pitt's reserves with a Craig Morton 14-yard touchdown pass to Craig Schraub. Morton passed to Schraub for the two point conversion.

The Pitt starting line-up for the game against California was Al Grigaliunas (left end), John Maczuzak (left tackle), Jeff Ware (left guard), Charles Ahlborn (center), Ed Adamchik (right guard), Ernest Borghetti (right tackle), Joe Kuzneski (right end), Fred Mazurek (quarterback), Paul Martha (left halfback), Bill Bodle (right halfback) and Rick Leeson (fullback). Substitutes appearing in the game for Pitt were William Howley, Ronald Linaburg, Ray Popp, Bernie LaQuinta, Martin Schottenheimer, Paul Cercel, James Irwin, James Jones, John Jenkins, John Ozimek, Eugene Sobolewski, Kenny Lucas, Francis Novak, Tom Black, Glen Lehner, Dale Stewart, Eric Crabtree, Robert Roeder, Barry McKnight and John Telesky.

Statistics	CAL	PITT
First downs	13	24
Plays–yards	63–257	73–446
Rushes–yards	25–51	47–250
Passing yards	206	196
Passing: comp–att–int	19–38	13–26
Turnovers	5	4
Time of possession	na	na

Team	Category	Player	Statistics
CAL	Passing	Craig Morton	19/38, 206 yards, 1 int
CAL	Rushing	Tom Branchfield	3 carries, 20 yards
CAL	Receiving	Jack Schraub	7 receptions, 88 yards
PITT	Passing	Fred Mazurek	6/12, 112 yards
PITT	Rushing	Rick Leeson	6 carries, 46 yards
PITT	Receiving	William Howley	3 receptions, 43 yards

=== At West Virginia ===
Week 4: Pitt at West Virginia

Team	1	2	3	4	Total
• Pitt	7	0	0	6	13
West Virginia	0	3	0	7	10

- Date: October 19, 1963
- Location: Mountaineer Field
  Morgantown, WV
- Game start: 1:00 p.m.
- Game attendance: 31,000
- Game weather: hot
- Referee: Francis P. Brennan

Scoring summary
1	PITT	Joe Kuzneski 3-yard pass from Fred Mazurek (Rick Leeson kick)	PITT 7–0
2	WVA	Chuck KInder 31-yard field goal	PITT 7–3
4	WVU	Dick Leftridge 5-yard pass from Jerry Yost (Kinder kick)	WVU 10–7
4	PITT	Paul Martha 46-yard run (kick failed)	PITT 13–10

On October 19, the 1963 Backyard Brawl was played on Mountaineer Field. Coach Gene Corum's Mounties were 2–2 on the season, and a two touchdown underdog to the #3 ranked Panthers. Pitt led the all-time series 39–15–1, but had lost 3 of the previous 4.

In front of 31,000 Homecoming Day fans, Pitt managed a come-from-behind 13–10 victory to improve their record to 4–0. The Pitt offense drove to the WVU 15 to open the game, but Paul Martha fumbled. The Panthers regained possession on their own 29-yard line. An 11-play drive was capped with a Fred Mazurek 5-yard touchdown pass to Joe Kuzneski. Rick Leeson booted the point after and Pitt led 7–0. West Virginia kicker Chuck Kinder made a 31-yard field goal in the second quarter that was dominated by 90 yards of penalties (50 on Pitt and 40 on WVU). After earlier having a touchdown negated by a clipping penalty, and then fumbling on the Pitt 2-yard line, West Virginia's offense scored in the final quarter on a 5-yard pass from Jerry Yost to Dick Leftridge. Kinder added the placement and the Mountaineers led 10–7. Pitt took possession on their 20-yard line. Martha raced 46-yards through the left side of the defense for the go-ahead score on the sixth play. Leeson missed the extra point. Then Pitt's Bob Roeder intercepted a Yost pass at midfield, and Pitt ran out the clock.

Fred Mazurek completed 7 of 9 passes for 82 yards. Fullback Rick Leeson carried the ball 11 times for 82 yards, and he caught 3 passes for 40 yards.

The Pitt starting line-up for the game against West Virginian was Al Grigaliunas (left end), John Maczuzak (left tackle), Jeff Ware (left guard), Charles Ahlborn (center), Ed Adamchik (right guard), Ernest Borghetti (right tackle), Joe Kuzneski (right end), Fred Mazurek (quarterback), Paul Martha (left halfback), Bill Bodle (right halfback) and Rick Leeson (fullback). Substitutes appearing in the game for Pitt were William Howley, James Jones, Ray Popp, Martin Schottenheimer, Paul Cercel, James Irwin, Bernard LaQuinta, Ronald Linaburg, James Jenkins, John Verkleeren, Robert Long, Kenny Lucas, Glenn Lehner, Tom Black, Robert Roeder, Eric Crabtree, John Telesky, Barry McKnight and Marvin Lippincot.

Statistics	PITT	WVU
First downs	15	11
Plays–yards	53–286	56–179
Rushes–yards	41–193	42–88
Passing yards	93	91
Passing: comp–att–int	9–12-1	7–14-1
Turnovers	1	2
Time of possession	na	na

Team	Category	Player	Statistics
PITT	Passing	Fred Mazurek	7/9, 82 yards, 1 int
PITT	Rushing	Rick Leeson	11 carries, 82 yards
PITT	Receiving	Rick Leeson	3 receptions, 40 yards
WVU	Passing	Jerry Yost	7/14, 91 yards, 1 int
WVU	Rushing	Dick Leftridge	11 carries, 56 yards
WVU	Receiving	Fred Hauff	2 receptions, 22 yards

=== at Navy ===
Week 5: Navy

Team	1	2	3	4	Total
Pitt	0	0	0	12	12
• Navy	3	7	0	14	24

- Date: October 26, 1963
- Location: Navy–Marine Corps Memorial Stadium
  Annapolis, MD
- Game start: 1:30 p.m.
- Game attendance: 30,231
- Game weather: warm
- Referee: Gerald F. Hogan

Scoring summary
1	NAVY	Fred Marlin 36-yard field goal	NAVY 3–0
2	NAVY	Johnny Sai 1-yard run (Marlin kick)	NAVY 10–0
4	NAVY	Roger Staubach 1-yard run (Marlin kick)	NAVY 17–0
4	PITT	Eric Crabtree 39-yard pass from Kenny Lucas ( pass failed)	NAVY 17–6
4	NAVY	Pat Donnelly 1-yard run (Marlin kick)	NAVY 24–6
4	PITT	Paul Martha 74-yard pass from Lucas (pass failed)	NAVY 24–12

On October 26, The Panthers travelled to Annapolis, MD to play the Navy Midshipmen. Pitt led the all-time series 7–3–1, but had lost 2 of the past 3 games. Wayne Hardin's Middies were 4–1 on the season and ranked #10. Pitt was ranked #3 and was a 4-point underdog.

The Panthers lost 24–12 in front of a near capacity crowd of 30,231 at the Navy-Marine Corps Memorial Stadium. It would turn out to be their only loss of the season. Navy quarterback Roger Staubach befuddled the Panther defense. He completed 14 of 19 passes for 168 yards, he rushed for 60 yards on 19 carries (but he was sacked for 93 yards in losses) and he caught 2 passes for 19 yards. Navy center, Tom Lynch, intercepted a Fred Mazurek pass in the opening quarter, which led to Fred Marlin converting a 36-yard field goal to put Navy ahead 3–0. Navy's Pat Donnelly intercepted a Mazurek pass that resulted in a 1-yard touchdown run by John Sai in the second quarter. Marlin added the placement and Navy led 10–0 at halftime. Navy's third interception resulted in a 1-yard touchdown sneak by Staubach and Marlin's extra point to extend the lead to 17–0 early in the final period . The Panther offense answered with a 39-yard touchdown pass from Kenny Lucas to Eric Crabtree. The two-point conversion try failed. Pitt regained possession on their 15-yard line, but Kenny Lucas threw the Panthers' fourth interception of the game, which was returned by Donnelly to the Panthers' 1-yard line. Donnelly scored on second down, and Marlin kicked the extra point for a 24–6 lead. Pitt answered with a 76-yard touchdown pass from Lucas to Paul Martha. The two-point conversion try again failed.

The Pitt starting line-up for the Navy game was Al Grigaliunas (left end), John Maczuzak (left tackle), Jeff Ware (left guard), Charles Ahlborn (center), Ed Adamchik (right guard), Ernest Borghetti (right tackle), Joe Kuzneski (right end), Fred Mazurek (quarterback), Paul Martha (left halfback), Bill Bodle (right halfback) and Rick Leeson (fullback). Substitutes appearing in the game for Pitt were William Howley, James Jones, Ray Popp, Joe Novogratz, Martin Schottenheimer, Paul Cercel, James Irwin, Bernard LaQuinta, Ronald Linaburg, James Jenkins, John Verkleeren, Eugene Sobolewski, Kenny Lucas, Robert Roeder, Dale Stewart, Eric Crabtree, John Telesky, Glen Lehner and Tom Black.

Statistics	PITT	NAVY
First downs	12	13
Plays–yards	51–249	64–198
Rushes–yards	25–76	43–11
Passing yards	173	187
Passing: comp–att–int	11-26-4	16–21
Turnovers	6	0
Time of possession	na	na

Team	Category	Player	Statistics
PITT	Passing	Kenny Lucas	9/19, 157 yards, 2 ints
PITT	Rushing	Rick Leeson	6 carries, 20 yards
PITT	Receiving	Paul Martha	1 receptions, 74 yards
NAVY	Passing	Roger Staubach	14/19, 168 yards
NAVY	Rushing	Pat Donnelly	6 carries, 18 yards
NAVY	Receiving	Jim Campbell	7 receptions, 92 yards

=== Syracuse ===
Week 6: Syracuse at Pitt

Team	1	2	3	4	Total
Syracuse	0	0	0	6	6
• Pitt	0	7	0	6	13

- Date: November 2, 1963
- Location: Pitt Stadium
  Pittsburgh, PA
- Game start: 1:30 p.m.
- Game attendance: 44,217
- Game weather: snow and wind

Scoring summary
1	SYR	Nat Duckett 3-yard run (John Paglio kick)	SYR 7–0
1	PITT	Fred Mazurek 2-yard run (Al Grigaliunas pass from Mazurek)	PITT 8–7
2	SYR	Richard King 3-yard run (Gus Giardi pass from King)	SYR 15–8
2	SYR	Duckett 1-yard run ( pass failed)	SYR 21–8
3	PITT	Mazurek 41-yard run (Rick Leeson pass from Mazurek)	SYR 21–16
3	PITT	Paul Martha 1-yard run (pass failed)	PITT 22–21
3	PITT	Grigaliunas 13-yard pass from Mazurek (pass failed)	PITT 28–21
4	SYR	Mike Koski 53-yard pass from King (run failed)	SYR 28–27
4	PITT	Leeson 3-yard run (Leeson kick)	PITT 35–27

On November 2, the Panthers welcomed Floyd Schwartzwalder's Syracuse Orangemen for their Youth Day and Homecoming game. Syracuse was 5–1 on the season, having only lost to Kansas. Pitt led the all-time series 10–6–2.

The Panthers won by scoring 27 second half points in a come-from-behind 35–27 victory. After falling behind 21–8 in the first half, the Panthers' defense held Syracuse to two second half first downs and one touchdown. Syracuse recovered a fumble on Pitt's opening possession at the Panthers' 19-yard line. Nat Duckett scored from the 3-yard line on the sixth play. John Paglio kicked the extra point for a 7–0 Syracuse lead. Pitt answered with a 19-play, 81-yard drive capped by a 2-yard run by Fred Mazurek. Mazurek hit Al Grigaliunas for the two point conversion and Pitt led 8–7 at the end of the first quarter. Syracuse scored twice in the second quarter to lead 21–8 at halftime. On the fifth play of the second half Mazurek scored his second touchdown of the day on a 41-yard run. Mazurek passed to Rick Leeson for the 2-point conversion. The Pitt defense forced a punt, and the Pitt offense marched 85 yards for the go-ahead score. Paul Martha scored from 1-yard out, and the two-point pass attempt was batted down. Pitt regained possession and scored on a 13-yard pass from Mazurek to Grigaliunas. The two-point pass attempt failed, but Pitt led 28–21 at the end of 3 quarters. Syracuse answered in the final period on a 53-yard pass from Richard King to Mike Koski. Their two-point try failed and Pitt held a 1- point lead. Syracuse regained possession, but Marty Schottenheimer intercepted on the Syracuse 45-yard line. Leeson capped the 45-yard, 8-play drive with a touchdown run from the 3-yard line, and kicked the extra point for the final 35–27 margin.

Pitt earned 24 first downs to Syracuse's 7, and Pitt outgained the Orange 338 yards to 203 yards. Quarterback Fred Mazurek led the Panthers with 119 yards rushing on 22 carries, and he completed 13 of 21 passes for 136 yards. He also scored two touchdowns and passed for another.

The Pitt starting line-up for the Syracuse game was Al Grigaliunas (left end), John Maczuzak (left tackle), Jeff Ware (left guard), Charles Ahlborn (center), Ed Adamchik (right guard), Ernest Borghetti (right tackle), Joe Kuzneski (right end), Fred Mazurek (quarterback), Paul Martha (left halfback), Bill Bodle (right halfback) and Rick Leeson (fullback). Substitutes appearing in the game for Pitt were William Howley, James Jones, Ray Popp, Martin Schottenheimer, Paul Cercel, James Irwin, Bernard LaQuinta, Ronald Linaburg, James Jenkins, Eugene Sobolewski, Kenny Lucas, Robert Roeder, Dale Stewart, Eric Crabtree, John Telesky, Glen Lehner and Tom Black.

Statistics	SYR	PITT
First downs	7	24
Plays–yards	42–203	84–338
Rushes–yards	29–140	60–193
Passing yards	63	145
Passing: comp–att–int	3-13-3	14–24–1
Turnovers	4	1
Time of possession	na	na

Team	Category	Player	Statistics
SYR	Passing	Richard King	3/12, 63 yards, 2 ints
SYR	Rushing	Gus Giardi	2 carries, 42 yards
SYR	Receiving	Mike Koski	1 reception, 53 yards
PITT	Passing	Fred Mazurek	13/21, 136 yards
PITT	Rushing	Fred Mazurek	22 carries, 119 yards
PITT	Receiving	Joe Kuzneski	6 receptions, 70 yards

=== at Notre Dame ===
Week 7: Notre Dame

Team	1	2	3	4	Total
Pitt	0	0	0	12	12
• Notre Dame	3	7	0	14	24

- Date: November 9, 1963
- Location: Notre Dame Stadium
  Notre Dame, IN
- Game start: 1:30 p.m.
- Game attendance: 41,306
- Game weather: clear and warm
- Referee: Don Hamilton

Scoring summary
1	ND	Frank Budka 1-yard run (Ken Ivan kick)	ND 7–0
1	PITT	Paul Martha 92-yard kickoff return ( kick blocked)	ND 7–6
2	PITT	Rick Leeson1-yard run (pass failed)	PITT 12–7
3	PITT	Fred Mazurek 10-yard run ( Mazurek run)	PITT 20–7
4	PITT	William Howley 6-yard pass from Kenny Lucas (Leeson kick)	PITT 27–7

On November 9, the Panthers traveled to South Bend, IN to play Coach Hugh Devore's Fighting Irish of Notre Dame for the 30th time. Notre Dame led the all-time series 18–10–1. Pitt had only won twice previously at Notre Dame. The Irish were 2–4 for the season.

The Pitt Panthers beat the Irish on their home turf for the third time 27–7. Notre Dame intercepted a Fred Mazurek pass on the Pitt 38-yard line early in the first quarter. The 12-play drive ended with Irish quarterback Frank Budka's 1-yard sneak for a touchdown. Ken Ivan booted the extra point and Pitt trailed 7–0. Pitt halfback Paul Martha answered with a 92-yard kickoff return for a touchdown. Rick Leeson's placement attempt was blocked and Pitt still trailed 7–6 at the end of the opening quarter. Eric Crabtree returned an Irish punt 45 yards to the Irish 25-yard line in the second period. Mazurek led an 8-play drive that was capped with a 1-yard plunge by Leeson. Mazurek's pass for the conversion was intercepted, but Pitt led 12–7 at halftime. Pitt gained possession on an interception on their 49-yard line in the third quarter. The Panthers scored in two plays. A 41-yard pass to Martha was followed by a 10-yard scamper by Mazurek for the touchdown. Mazurek ran for the 2-point conversion to increase the lead to 20–7. The second and third team substitutes scored in the final quarter on a 6-yard touchdown pass from Kenny Lucas to William Howley. Leeson booted the extra point to close the scoring.

The Pitt starting line-up for the Notre Dame game was Al Grigaliunas (left end), John Maczuzak (left tackle), Jeff Ware (left guard), Charles Ahlborn (center), Ed Adamchik (right guard), Ernest Borghetti (right tackle), Joe Kuzneski (right end), Fred Mazurek (quarterback), Paul Martha (left halfback), Bill Bodle (right halfback) and Rick Leeson (fullback). Substitutes appearing in the game for Pitt were William Howley, John Verkleeran, James Jones, Tom Raymond, Ray Popp, Joe Novogratz, Martin Schottenheimer, Paul Cercel, Fred Hoaglin, James Irwin, Bernard LaQuinta, Robert Sorochak, Ronald Linaburg, Dennis Bernick, James Jenkins, Eugene Sobolewski, Mitchell Zalnasky, Kenny Lucas, Francis Novak, Robert Roeder, Dale Stewart, Eric Crabtree, John Telesky, Glen Lehner, Barry McKnight, John Ozimek and Tom Black.

Statistics	PITT	ND
First downs	18	13
Plays–yards	63–288	57–167
Rushes–yards	46–158	44–87
Passing yards	130	80
Passing: comp–att–int	11-17-3	6–13–1
Turnovers	4	3
Time of possession	na	na

Team	Category	Player	Statistics
PITT	Passing	Fred Mazurek	8/13, 111 yards, 1 int
PITT	Rushing	Fred Mazurek	14 carries, 42 yards
PITT	Receiving	Paul Martha	4 receptions, 63 yards
ND	Passing	John Huarte	5/8, 71 yards
ND	Rushing	Bill Wolski	9 carries, 61 yards
ND	Receiving	Jim Kelly	3 receptions, 34 yards

=== Army ===
Week 8: Army at Pitt

Team	1	2	3	4	Total
Army	0	0	0	0	0
• Pitt	6	9	6	7	28

- Date: November 16, 1963
- Location: Pitt Stadium
  Pittsburgh, PA
- Game start: 1:30 p.m.
- Game attendance: 47,947
- Game weather: cloudy
- Referee: Gerald F. Hogan

Scoring summary
1	PITT	Paul Martha 48-yard run (pass failed)	PITT 6–0
2	PITT	Fred Mazurek 33-yard run (run failed)	PITT 12–0
2	PITT	Rick Leeson 29-yard field goal	PITT 15–0
3	PITT	Leeson 5-yard run ( pass failed)	PITT 21–0
4	PITT	Eric Crabtree 27-yard pass from Kenny Lucas (Leeson kick)	PITT 28–0

The #6 ranked Pitt Panthers welcomed the Army Cadets for their fourth home game of the season. Coach Paul Dietzel's Cadets were 7–1, but an 8-point underdog. Pitt led the all-time series 6–2–2.

In front of 47,947 fans, the Pitt Panthers improved their record to 7–1 with a 28–0 shutout of the Army Cadets. Pitt gained possession on their 20-yard line late in the opening quarter. Paul Martha ran through right tackle for a 48-yard touchdown on the fourth play. The two-point pass attempt failed and Pitt led 6–0. The Panthers scored twice in the second quarter. Quarterback Fred Mazurek went 33-yards on a keeper play for a touchdown, but his run for the extra points fell short. Rick Leeson then kicked a 29-yard field goal to make the halftime score 15–0. The Panthers offense started the third quarter with an 8-play, 66-yard drive capped by Leeson's 5-yard touchdown run. The Panthers substitutes added a touchdown in the final period when Kenny Lucas's 27-yard pass was deflected by Army defensive back James Bierschmitt into the hands of Pitt end Eric Crabtree. Leeson kicked the extra point.

The Pitt starting line-up for the Army game was Al Grigaliunas (left end), John Maczuzak (left tackle), Jeff Ware (left guard), Charles Ahlborn (center), Ed Adamchik (right guard), Ernest Borghetti (right tackle), Joe Kuzneski (right end), Fred Mazurek (quarterback), Paul Martha (left halfback), Bill Bodle (right halfback) and Rick Leeson (fullback). Substitutes appearing in the game for Pitt were William Howley, John Verkleeran, Ron Long, Dan Picciano, James Jones, Tom Raymond, Ray Popp, Joe Novogratz, Martin Schottenheimer, Paul Cercel, Fred Hoaglin, Jock Beachler, James Irwin, Bernard LaQuinta, Robert Sorochak, Ronald Linaburg, Dennis Bernick, James Jenkins, Eugene Sobolewski, Mitchell Zalnasky, Kenny Lucas, Francis Novak, Robert Roeder, Dale Stewart, Eric Crabtree, John Telesky, Glen Lehner, Barry McKnight, John Ozimek and Tom Black.

Statistics	ARMY	PITT
First downs	12	15
Plays–yards	60–175	60–443
Rushes–yards	40–105	49–359
Passing yards	70	84
Passing: comp–att–int	9-20-1	6–11–1
Turnovers	4	4
Time of possession	na	na

Team	Category	Player	Statistics
ARMY	Passing	Carl Stichweh	7/14, 45 yards
ARMY	Rushing	Carl Stichweh	18 carries, 46 yards
ARMY	Receiving	Sam Champi	3 receptions, 17 yards
PITT	Passing	Kenny Lucas	4/6, 72 yards, 1 int
PITT	Rushing	Paul Martha	6 carries, 103 yards
PITT	Receiving	John Jenkins	2 receptions, 29 yards

=== at Miami (FL) ===
Week 9: Miami

Team	1	2	3	4	Total
• Pitt	9	7	6	9	31
Miami	14	0	6	0	20

- Date: November 30, 1963
- Location: Miami Orange Bowl
  Miami, FL
- Game start: 8:00 p.m.
- Game attendance: 33,230
- Game weather: cool
- Referee: Johnny Cook

Scoring summary
1	MIAMI	Pete Banaszak 1-yard run (Don Cifra kick)	MIAMI 7–0
1	PITT	safety when ball centered over punter's head	MIAMI 7–2
1	PITT	Fred Mazurek 8-yard run (Rick Leeson kick)	PITT 9–7
1	MIAMI	Nick Spinelli 6-yard pass from George Mira ( Cifra kick)	MIAMI 14–9
2	PITT	Bill Bodle 2-yard run ( Rick Leeson kick)	PITT 16–14
3	PITT	William Howley 17-yard pass from Mazurek ( kick failed)	PITT 22–14
3	MIAMI	Spinelli 11-yard pass from Mira (pass failed)	PITT 22–20
4	PITT	Leeson 1-yard run (kick failed)	PITT 28–20
4	PITT	Leeson 24-yard field goal	PITT 31–20

On November 30, the #5 ranked Panthers final road game was to Miami, Florida to play Coach Andy Gustafson's Hurricanes at Orange Bowl Stadium. The Hurricanes were 3–5 for the season. The all-time series was tied at 4 games apiece.

The Panthers beat the Hurricanes 31–20 in front of 33,230 hostile fans to improve their record to 8–1. Each team scored two touchdowns in the first half, but Pitt led 16–14 thanks to a mishandled center snap that led to a safety. The Pitt defense held Miami's offense to one second half touchdown, while the Pitt offense scored two touchdowns and a field goal. Pitt quarterback Fred Mazurek led the Panthers with 146 rushing yards on 21 carries and 149 passing yards on 10 of 18 completions. Paul Martha gained 108 yards on 20 carries. Mazurek, Bill Bodle, Bill Howley and Rick Leeson scored for the Panthers. Pete Banaszak opened the scoring for Miami on a 1-yard run. George Mira passed to Nick Spinelli for their other two scores. Mira completed 25 of 43 passes for 309 yards.

Statistics	PITT	MIAMI
First downs	29	25
Plays–yards	84–498	59–405
Rushes–yards	66–349	16–98
Passing yards	149	309
Passing: comp–att–int	10-18-1	25–43–3
Turnovers	1	3
Time of possession	na	na

Team	Category	Player	Statistics
PITT	Passing	Fred Mazurek	10/18, 149 yards, 1 int
PITT	Rushing	Fred Mazurek	21 carries, 146 yards
PITT	Receiving	Joe Kuzneski	3 receptions, 51 yards
MIAMI	Passing	George Mira	25/43, 309 yards, 3 ints
MIAMI	Rushing	Pete Banaszak	6 carries, 61 yards
MIAMI	Receiving	Nick Spinelli	9 receptions, 108 yards

=== Penn State ===
Week 10: Penn State at Pitt

Team	1	2	3	4	Total
Penn State	0	0	0	0	0
• Pitt	6	9	6	7	28

- Date: December 7, 1963
- Location: Pitt Stadium
  Pittsburgh, PA
- Game start: 1:00 p.m.
- Game attendance: 52,349
- Game weather: sunny

Scoring summary
1	PSU	Gary Klingensmith 9-yard run (Ron Coates kick)	PSU 7–0
2	PITT	Paul Martha 1-yard run (pass failed)	PSU 7–6
2	PSU	Gerry Sandusky 9-yard pass from Pete Liske (Coates kick)	PSU 14–6
2	PITT	Rick Leeson 1-yard run ( pass failed)	PSU 14–12
3	PITT	Rick Leeson 35-yard field goal	PITT 15–14
3	PSU	Don Caum 10-yard pass from Liske ( Coates kick)	PSU 21–15
4	PITT	Fred Mazurek 17-yard run (Leeson kick)	PITT 22–21

On December 7, the #4-ranked Pitt Panthers played their in-state rival Penn State for the sixty-third time. Pitt led the all-time series 33–26–3. Coach Rip Engle's Lions were 7–2 for the season.

Sixteen seniors (Chuck Ahlborn, Jeff Ware, John Maczuzak, Ernie Borghetti, Ed Adamchik, John Jenkins, Glenn Lehner, Rick Leeson, Joe Kuzneski, Gene Sobolewski, Bob Long, Al Grigaliunas, John Telesky, Bob Roeder, John Ozimek and Paul Martha) suited up for their final game as Pitt Panthers. So far they were 0–3 against Penn State.

Pitt kept the 52,349 fans on the edge of their seats as they defeated the Nittany Lions 22–21 in a hard fought come-from-behind victory. Penn State scored first on a 9-yard run by Gary Klingensmith, and Ron Coates kicked the extra point. Pitt answered with a 46-yard drive capped on a 1-yard plunge over right tackle by Paul Martha. The two-point conversion failed. Penn State recovered a Fred Mazurek fumble on the Pitt 36-yard line. Pete Liske hit Gerry Sandusky with a 9-yard touchdown pass on the seventh play. Coates kicked the extra point. Pitt countered before halftime with an 80-yard, 9-play drive. Rick Leeson went through right guard from the 1-yard line for the touchdown, but the two-point conversion failed again. Pitt trailed at halftime 12–14. Pitt managed to score first and last in the second half. The Staties drove to the Panthers 10-yard line, but the Pitt defense held and took over on downs. The Panthers drove to the State 7-yard line, and had to settle for a 25-yard Rick Leeson field goal for their first lead of the game. (15–14) It was short-lived as Penn State took the kick-off and drove 75-yards in 8 plays. Liske threw a 10-yard pass to Don Caum for the go-ahead score and Coates added the point after. Pitt regained the lead for good in the final quarter with a 77-yard, 11-play drive. Fred Mazurek ran the final 17-yards for the touchdown and Leeson booted the extra point to put the Panthers ahead 22–21. Penn State managed to get into field goal range, but Coates was wide-left on his 37-yard attempt. Pitt finished the season with a 9–1 record.

The Pitt starting line-up for the Penn State game was Al Grigaliunas (left end), John Maczuzak (left tackle), Jeff Ware (left guard), Charles Ahlborn (center), Ed Adamchik (right guard), Ernest Borghetti (right tackle), Joe Kuzneski (right end), Fred Mazurek (quarterback), Paul Martha (left halfback), Bill Bodle (right halfback) and Rick Leeson (fullback). Substitutes appearing in the game for Pitt were William Howley, Ron Long, James Jones, Tom Raymond, Ray Popp, Martin Schottenheimer, Paul Cercel, James Irwin, Bernard LaQuinta, Ronald Linaburg, James Jenkins, Eugene Sobolewski, Kenny Lucas, Robert Roeder, Dale Stewart, Eric Crabtree, John Telesky, Glen Lehner and Tom Black.

Statistics	PSU	PITT
First downs	12	23
Plays–yards	54–279	83–421
Rushes–yards	31–106	63–276
Passing yards	173	145
Passing: comp–att–int	11-23-1	10–20
Turnovers	1	2
Time of possession	na	na

Team	Category	Player	Statistics
PSU	Passing	Pete Liske	11/23, 173 yards, 1 int
PSU	Rushing	Gary Klingensmith	14 carries, 47 yards
PSU	Receiving	Don Caum	4 reception, 99 yards
PITT	Passing	Fred Mazurek	7/15, 108 yards
PITT	Rushing	Fred Mazurek	23 carries, 142 yards
PITT	Receiving	Al Grigaliunas	2 receptions, 33 yards

== Postseason ==
Pitt ended the season with a 9–1 record. They were ranked #3 by the United Press International and #4 by the Associated Press, but they were not extended a bowl invitation. Ten years later Randy L. Jesick, a researcher, documented what the members of the 1963 roster were doing. "Of the 75 players on his (Michelosen's) roster, Jesick found that 66 had graduated; 33 from that lot enrolled in post-graduate programs. There were three doctors, 15 dentists, five lawyers, seven educators, 28 involved in industry and two ministers."

Even though the Panthers were overlooked for a bowl invitation, several players were chosen for the various all-star games. On December 21, guard Jeff Ware and end Al Grigaliunas played in the North-South Shrine Game in Miami, Florida. On December 28, halfback Paul Martha, fullback Rick Leeson and tackle Ernie Borghetti played in the East-West Shrine Game in San Francisco, California. On December 25, tackle John Maczuzak played in the Blue-Gray Football Classic in Montgomery, Alabama. On January 4, 1964, Paul Martha, Rick Leeson and Ernie Borghetti played in the Hula Bowl in Honolulu, Hawaii. On August 7, 1964, Paul Martha, Ernie Borghetti and John Maczuzak played in the College All-Star Football Classic in Chicago, Illinois.

Halfback Paul Martha was named first team All-America by the Newspaper Enterprise Association, The Sporting News and the Central Press Association. He was named to the second team by United Press International, Look magazine and the American Football Coaches Association. Ernie Borghetti was named first team All-America on the Look magazine squad and third team by the Newspaper Enterprise Association. Guard Ed Adamchik was named second team All-America by the Newspaper Enterprise Association.

== Coaching staff ==
1963 Pittsburgh Panthers football staff
Coaching staff: John Michelosen – head coach; Carl DePasqua –defensive backs coach; Walter Cummins – center coach; Steve Petro – guard coach; Lou Cecconi– backfield coach; Ernie Hefferle – end coach; Joe Pullekines – line coach; Bill Kaliden – freshman coach	Support staff: Frank Carver– athletic director; J. Clyde Barton – assistant athletic director; Walter Cummins – assistant athletic director; Carroll Cook– athletic publicity director; Dr. W. K. Smith – team doctor; Dr. Chester Phillips – team doctor; Dr.Richard Deitrick – team doctor; Howard Waite – trainer; Walter O. Willoughby – trainer; Frank Wiechec - trainer; James L. Hogan – student manager

== Roster ==
1963 Pittsburgh Panthers football roster
Player	Position	Games	Weight	Height	Class	Prep School	Hometown
Tom Abele	fullback	0	205	6 ft 2 in	junior	Niskatuna H. S.	Schenectady, NY
Ed Adamchik*	guard	10	230	6 ft 2 in	senior	Johnstown H. S.	Johnstown, PA
Charles Ahlborn*	center	10	210	6 ft 2 in	senior	Rostraver Twp. H. S.	Belle Vernon, PA
Ed Assid	quarterback	0	185	6 ft 3 in	sophomore	New Castle H. S.	New Castle, PA
Jock Beachler	center	2	185	5 ft 11 in	sophomore	Mt. Lebanon H. S.	Mt. Lebanon, PA
William Beck	halfback	0	185	5 ft 10 in	junior	Portage Area H. S.	Portage, PA
Dennis Bernick	tackle	4	215	6 ft	junior	McKeesport H. S.	McKeesport, PA
Peter Billey	halfback	0	170	5 ft 9 in	senior	Hurst H. S.	United, PA
Tom Black*	quarterback	10	180	6 ft 1 in	junior	Washington Twp. H. S.	Apollo, PA
William Bodle*	halfback	10	195	6 ft	junior	Highland Park H. S.	Deerfield, IL
Ernest Borghetti*	tackle	10	242	6 ft 4 in	senior	Ursuline H. S.	Youngstown, OH
Bill Buchanan	guard	0	213	6 ft 2 in	sophomore	Waynesburg H. S.	Waynesburg, PA
Paul Cercel*	center	10	225	6 ft 1 in	junior	Austintown-Fitch H. S.	Youngstown, OH
Gerald Cherry*	tackle	0	225	6 ft	junior	West Mifflin H. S.	Munhall, PA
Ronald Cimino	guard	0	185	5 ft 11 in	sophomore	Swissvale H. S.	Swissvale, PA
Ray Conway*	halfback	0	183	6 ft	junior	Peabody-Shadyside H. S.	Pittsburgh, PA
Eric Crabtree*	halfback	10	180	6 ft	sophomore	Monessen H. S.	Monessen, PA
John Cullen*	guard	0	205	6 ft	junior	Munhall H. S.	Munhall, PA
Phil Dahar	end	0	197	6 ft 2 in	sophomore	Dillonvale H. S.	Dillonvale, OH
Dick Dobrowolski*	tackle	0	215	6 ft	junior	Tarentum H. S.	Tarentum, PA
James Dodaro	halfback	0	195	6 ft 1 in	sophomore	North Catholic H. S.	Pittsburgh, PA
Ronald Dodson	end	0	195	6 ft	junior	Altoona H. S.	Altoona, PA
James Eskridge	end	0	195	6 ft 2 in	junior	Rootstown H. S.	New Milford, OH
James Ferraco	halfback	0	175	6 ft 1 in	junior	Hampton Twp. H. S.	Allison Park, PA
Tom Furjanic	tackle	0	200	6 ft 3 in	sophomore	Bishop-McDevitt H. S.	Steelton, PA
Bill Galella	guard	0	215	6 ft 1 in	sophomore	West Scranton H. S.	Scranton, PA
Al Grigaliunis*	end	10	200	5 ft 11 in	senior	Benedictine H. S.	Cleveland, OH
Bob Guzinsky	tackle	2	224	6 ft 2 in	sophomore	Mahonoy, Manlius H. S.	Mahonoy City, PA
Sanford Hill	halfback	0	190	6 ft	sophomore	McCaskey H. S.	Lancaster, PA
Fred Hoaglin	center	4	205	6 ft 4 in	sophomore	East Palestine H. S.	East Palestine, OH
William Howley*	end	10	205	6 ft 2 in	junior	Munhall H. S.	Munhall, PA
James Irwin*	guard	10	210	6 ft	junior	Taylor-Allderdice H. S.	Pittsburgh, PA
John Jenkins*	end	10	215	6 ft 4 in	senior	Union Area Joint H. S.	New Castle, PA
James Jones*	tackle	10	265	6 ft 1 in	sophomore	Easton H. S.	Easton, PA
Mike Karnish	end	0	197	6 ft	sophomore	Lansford H. S.	Lansford, PA
Paul Kisiday	center	0	210	6 ft 2 in	junior	Ambridge H. S.	Ambridge, PA
Joe Kuzneski*	end	10	195	6 ft 3 in	senior	Indiana Joint H. S.	Indiana, PA
Edward Lally	tackle	0	225	6 ft 2 in	junior	Sharpsville H. S.	Sharpsville, PA
Bernard LaQuinta*	fullback	10	200	5 ft 10 in	junior	Mt. Lebanon H. S.	Mt. Lebanon, PA
Rick Leeson*	fullback	10	195	6 ft 1 in	senior	Scott Twp. H. S.	Scott Twp., PA
Glen Lehner*	quarterback	10	190	6 ft 1 in	senior	Baldwin H. S.	Baldwin, PA
Ronald Linaburg*	tackle	10	220	6 ft 3 in	junior	Monongahela H. S.	Monongahela, PA
Marvin Lippincott*	halfback	2	195	6 ft	senior	Phillipsburg H. S.	Riegelsville, NJ
Robert Long*	end	5	200	6 ft 3 in	senior	Sharon H.S.	Sharon, PA
Kenny Lucas*	quarterback	10	180	6 ft	sophomore	Glassport H. S.	Glassport, PA
George Macko	tackle	0	235	6 ft	sophomore	Greensburg, Manlius H. S.	Greensburg, PA
John Maczuzak*	tackle	10	233	6 ft 5 in	senior	Ellsworth H.S.	Ellsworth, PA
Paul Martha*	halfback	10	180	6 ft	senior	Shady Side H. S.	Wilkinsburg, PA
Fred Mazurek*	quarterback	10	190	5 ft 10 in	junior	Redstone H. S.	Republic, PA
Barry McKnight*	fullback	5	204	6 ft	sophomore	Indiana H. S.	Indiana, PA
Bob Milkovitz	tackle	0	230	6 ft 2 in	sophomore	Easton H. S.	Easton, PA
Jake Mullett	halfback	0	187	6 ft 1 in	sophomore	Magnolia H. S.	North Martinsville, WV
Francis Novak*	quarterback	4	186	6 ft	junior	South Union H. S.	Uniontown, PA
Joe Novogratz	guard	5	210	6 ft 2 in	sophomore	Northampton, Bordentown H. S.	Northampton, PA
John Ozimek*	halfback	4	185	5 ft 10 in	senior	Burgettstown-Union H. S.	Bulger, PA
Ken Perry	quarterback	0	185	5 ft 11 in	sophomore	Monongahela H. S.	Finleyville, PA
Dan Picciano	end	2	185	6 ft 1 in	junior	Jeannette H. S.	Jeanette, PA
Ray Popp*	guard	10	225	6 ft 1 in	senior	Monongahela H. S.	Monongahela, PA
Tom Raymond	tackle	5	224	6 ft 1 in	sophomore	Beth-Center H. S.	Centerville, PA
Robert Roeder*	halfback	10	185	5 ft 11 in	senior	Emmaus H. S.	Emmaus, PA
Martin Schottenheimer*	center	10	215	6 ft 3 in	junior	Fort Cherry H. S.	McDonald, PA
Ronald Simantel	end	0	210	6 ft 7 in	junior	New Kensington H. S.	New Kensington, PA
Stephen Sisak	tackle	0	220	6 ft 2 in	junior	Laura Lamar H. S.	Graceton, PA
Eugene Sobolewski*	end	9	190	6 ft 2 in	senior	Freeport H. S.	Freeport, PA
Robert Sorochak	guard	3	215	5 ft 10 in	junior	Kingston H. S.	Kingston, PA
Carmen Sporio	fullback	0	197	6 ft	sophomore	Thomas Jefferson H. S.	Clairton, PA
Dale Stewart	halfback	9	205	6 ft 1 in	sophomore	Hazelton, Manlius H. S.	Hazelton, PA
Gabe Tamburino	center	0	215	6 ft 3 in	sophomore	Ursuline H. S.	Youngstown, OH
John Telesky*	fullback	10	205	5 ft 10 in	senior	BloomsburgH. S.	Bloomsburg, PA
John Verkleeren*	end	7	195	6 ft 3 in	sophomore	Charleroi H. S.	Charleroi, PA
Jeff Ware*	tackle	10	215	6 ft 1 in	senior	Cedar Cliff H. S.	Rocky River, OH
John Zabkar	guard	0	210	5 ft 11 in	junior	Latrobe H. S.	Latrobe, PA
Mitchell Zalnasky	end	4	200	6 ft 2 in	sophomore	West Allegheny H. S.	Tyre, PA
* Letterman

== Individual scoring summary ==
1963 Pittsburgh Panthers scoring summary
Player	Touchdowns	Extra points	Two pointers	Field goals	Safety	Points
Rick Leeson	7	13	1	5	0	72
Paul Martha	8	0	0	0	0	48
Fred Mazurek	7	0	2	0	0	46
Eric Crabtree	4	0	0	0	0	24
Joe Kuzneski	2	0	0	0	0	12
William Howley	2	0	0	0	0	12
Al Grigaliunas	1	0	1	0	0	8
Barry McKnight	1	0	0	0	0	6
Bill Bodle	1	0	0	0	0	6
Team	0	0	0	0	1	2
Totals	33	13	4	5	1	236

== Statistical leaders ==
Pittsburgh's individual statistical leaders for the 1963 season include those listed below.

=== Rushing ===
Player	Attempts	Net yards	Yards per attempt	Touchdowns
Fred Mazurek	132	646	4.9	7
Rick Leeson	98	501	5.1	6
Paul Martha	89	485	5.4	7

=== Passing ===
Player	Attempts	Completions	Interceptions	Comp %	Yards	Yds/Comp	TD
Fred Mazurek	127	74	7	58.3	949	12.8	5
Ken Lucas	55	30	5	54.5	436	14.5	5

=== Receiving ===
Player	Receptions	Yards	Yds/Recp	TD
Joe Kuzneski	21	258	12.3	2
William Howley	18	235	13.1	2
Bill Bodle	17	183	10.8	0
Paul Martha	15	253	16.9	1
John Jenkins	13	121	9.3	0
Al Grigaliunas	9	122	13.6	1
Eric Crabtree	9	138	15.3	3

=== Kickoff returns ===
Player	Returns	Yards	Yds/Return	TD
Paul Martha	9	286	31.8	1
Eric Crabtree	6	129	21.5	0
Fred Mazurek	4	69	17.2	0

=== Punt returns ===
Player	Returns	Yards	Yds/Return	TD
Eric Crabtree	12	121	10.1	0
Paul Martha	6	50	8.3	0

== Team players drafted into the NFL ==
The following Panthers were chosen by NFL teams during their 1964 draft.

Player	Position	Round	Pick	NFL club
Paul Martha	Defensive back	1	10	Pittsburgh Steelers
Ray Popp	Guard	8	100	New York Giants
Rick Leeson	Back	10	130	Washington Redskins
Paul Cercel	Center	16	213	Dallas Cowboys
Brian Generalovich	End	20	275	Pittsburgh Steelers

== Team players drafted into the AFL ==
The following Panthers were chosen by AFL teams during their 1964 draft.

Player	Position	Round	Pick	AFL club
Paul Martha	defensive back	9	69	Buffalo Bills
Jeff Ware	linebacker	13	99	New York Jets
Ray Popp	linebacker	16	123	New York Jets
Paul Cercel	center	19	152	San Diego Chargers
Brian Generalovich	end	25	196	Boston Patriots

== Media ==
=== Radio ===
Flagship station	Play-by-play	Color commentator	Sideline reporter	Studio host
WWSW–AM 970				
