= Vern Burke =

American football player (born 1941)

No. 83, 84
- Positions: Split end, Tight end

Personal information
- Born: April 30, 1941 (age 85); San Luis Obispo, California, U.S.
- Listed height: 6 ft 4 in (1.93 m)
- Listed weight: 215 lb (98 kg)

Career information
- High school: Bakersfield (CA) North
- College: Oregon State
- NFL draft: 1963: 5th round, 64th overall pick
- AFL draft: 1963: 15th round, 113th overall pick

Career history
- San Francisco 49ers (1963–1965); Atlanta Falcons (1966); New Orleans Saints (1967)

Awards and highlights
- Consensus All-American (1963); Second-team All-American (1962); Pop Warner Trophy (1963); First-team All-PCC (1963); Second-team All-PCC (1962); Oregon Sports Hall of Fame (ind. 1982); OSU Hall of Fame (ind. 1991)

Career NFL statistics
- Receptions: 38
- Receiving yards: 470
- Receiving touchdowns: 2
- Stats at Pro Football Reference

Vernon Eugene Burke (born April 30, 1941) is an American former professional football player who was a tight end for five seasons in the National Football League (NFL) with the San Francisco 49ers, Atlanta Falcons, and the New Orleans Saints.

== Early life ==
Burke attended North High School in Bakersfield, California and starred in football.

== College career ==
Burke attended Bakersfield College before he enrolled at Oregon State to play football. He lettered in football in 1961 and 1962, earning a spot as a first-team Consensus All-American at split end in 1962. Burke caught 69 passes for 1,007 yards, both NCAA records at the time. The Beavers finished 9–2 after a 6–0 victory over Villanova in the Liberty Bowl. The Beavers' lone touchdown in that game came on a 99-yard rushing touchdown by Beaver quarterback and 1962 Heisman Trophy winner, Terry Baker.

For his achievements in his senior season, Burke was chosen to play in the 1963 East-West Shrine Game and 1963 Hula Bowl. Burke was also awarded the 1963 W.J. Voit Memorial Trophy as the outstanding football player on the Pacific Coast.

== Professional career ==
Burke was selected in the fifth round of the 1963 NFL draft, the 64th pick overall, by the San Francisco 49ers. Burke did not debut in the NFL however until 1965. He later spent a year each with the Atlanta Falcons and the New Orleans Saints.

== Legacy ==
Burke was inducted into the State of Oregon Sports Hall of Fame in 1982 and the Oregon State University Sports Hall of Fame in 1991.
