= 1962 All-Pacific Coast football team =

American all-star college football team

The 1962 All-Pacific Coast football team consists of American football players chosen by various organizations for All-Pacific Coast teams for the 1962 NCAA University Division football season.

== Selections ==
=== Backs ===
- Kermit Alexander, UCLA (AP-1; UPI-1)
- Terry Baker, Oregon State (AP-1; UPI-1)
- Mel Renfro, Oregon (AP-1; UPI-1)
- Ed Cummings, Stanford (AP-1; UPI-2)
- Junior Coffey, Washington (UPI-1)
- George Reed, Washington State (AP-2; UPI-2)
- Charles H. Mitchell, Washington (AP-2; UPI-2)
- Pete Beathard, USC (AP-2; UPI-2)
- Willie Brown, USC (AP-2; UPI-2)
- Bob Berry, Oregon (UPI-3)
- Kern Carson, San Diego State (UPI-3)
- Johnny Johnson, San Jose State (UPI-3)
- Ben Wilson, USC (UPI-3)

=== Ends ===
- Hal Bedsole, USC (AP-1; UPI-1)
- Hugh Campbell, Washington State (AP-1; UPI-1)
- Vern Burke, Oregon State (AP-2; UPI-2)
- Lee Berhardi, Washington (UPI-2)
- Frank Patitucci, Stanford (AP-2; UPI-3)
- Mel Profit, UCLA (UPI-3)

=== Tackles ===
- Rod Scheyer, Washington (AP-1; UPI-2)
- Steve Barnett, Oregon (AP-2; UPI-1)
- Marv Marinovich, USC (AP-2; UPI-1)
- Ron Snidow, Oregon (AP-1; UPI-3)
- Al Hildebrand, Stanford (UPI-2)
- Gary Kirner, USC (UPI-3)

=== Guards ===
- Damon Bame, USC (AP-1; UPI-1)
- Rick Redman, Washington (AP-2; UPI-1)
- Mickey Ording, Oregon (AP-1; UPI-3)
- Marvin Harris, Stanford (AP-2)
- John Erby, Stanford (UPI-2)
- John Gamble, Pacific (UPI-3)

=== Centers ===
- Ray Mansfield, Washington (AP-1; UPI-1)
- Andy Von Sonn, UCLA (AP-2; UPI-2)
- J. R. Williams, Fresno State (UPI-3)

== Key ==
AP = Associated Press, selected from the seven members of the AP West Coast football board and AP sports writers
UPI = United Press International

== See also ==
- 1962 College Football All-America Team
