= North High School (Bakersfield, California) =

North Bakersfield High School
- School logo

Location
- 300 Galaxy Avenue; Bakersfield, California; United States
- Coordinates: 35°25′44″N 119°01′32″W

Information
- Type: Public
- Established: 1953; 73 years ago
- School district: Kern High School District
- Principal: Jodi Shupert
- Teaching staff: 84.25 (FTE)
- Grades: 9th through 12th
- Enrollment: 2,135 (2024-2025)
- Student to teacher ratio: 25.34
- Campus type: Modern
- Colors: Red, grey, and white
- Team name: North High Stars
- Yearbook: Galaxy
- Website: north.kernhigh.org

North High School (NHS) is a senior high school in Bakersfield, California, United States. The school is part of the Kern High School District. Its campus is on Galaxy Avenue.

== History ==
It became apparent that the existing high schools in the Kern High School District were not sufficient in number for the accelerated growth of greater Bakersfield. After several years of planning, ground was broken on March 23, 1952, for the construction of NHS. On September 8, 1953, NHS held their first classes with an enrollment of 625 students, with 28 teachers and counselors. Second year enrollment grew to 927 with 49 on the staff, and the third-year enrollment swelled to 1,300 guided by a staff of 50. Over 60 years later, North High's enrollment is over 2,000 students and certificated staff over 80.

In June 2023, Jodi Shupert was named principal.

== Academics ==
All students enrolled at NHS must meet the following criteria before graduation:

In total, 220 credits are necessary for a student at NHS to graduate. Every student must also pass the CAHSEE and an approved algebra course.

NHS offers AP, GATE, and Honors courses, which students can take to earn college credit, pass an SAT II exam, or be academically challenged.

== Notable alumni ==
- George Culver - founder of Bakersfield College Baseball program and Major League Baseball pitcher
- Kevin Harvick - NASCAR driver, 2014 Sprint Cup champion and 2007 Daytona 500 Winner
- Colby Lewis - former MLB player (Texas Rangers, Detroit Tigers, Oakland Athletics)
- Randy Rich - former NFL defensive back
- Stephen Underwood - drummer and vocalist for Southern Gospel Recording; touring artist, The Lighthouse Boys
- Bruce Walton - former MLB player (Oakland Athletics, Montreal Expos, Colorado Rockies) and pitching coach (Toronto Blue Jays)
