= Willie Brown (American football, born 1942) =

American football player and coach (1942–2018)

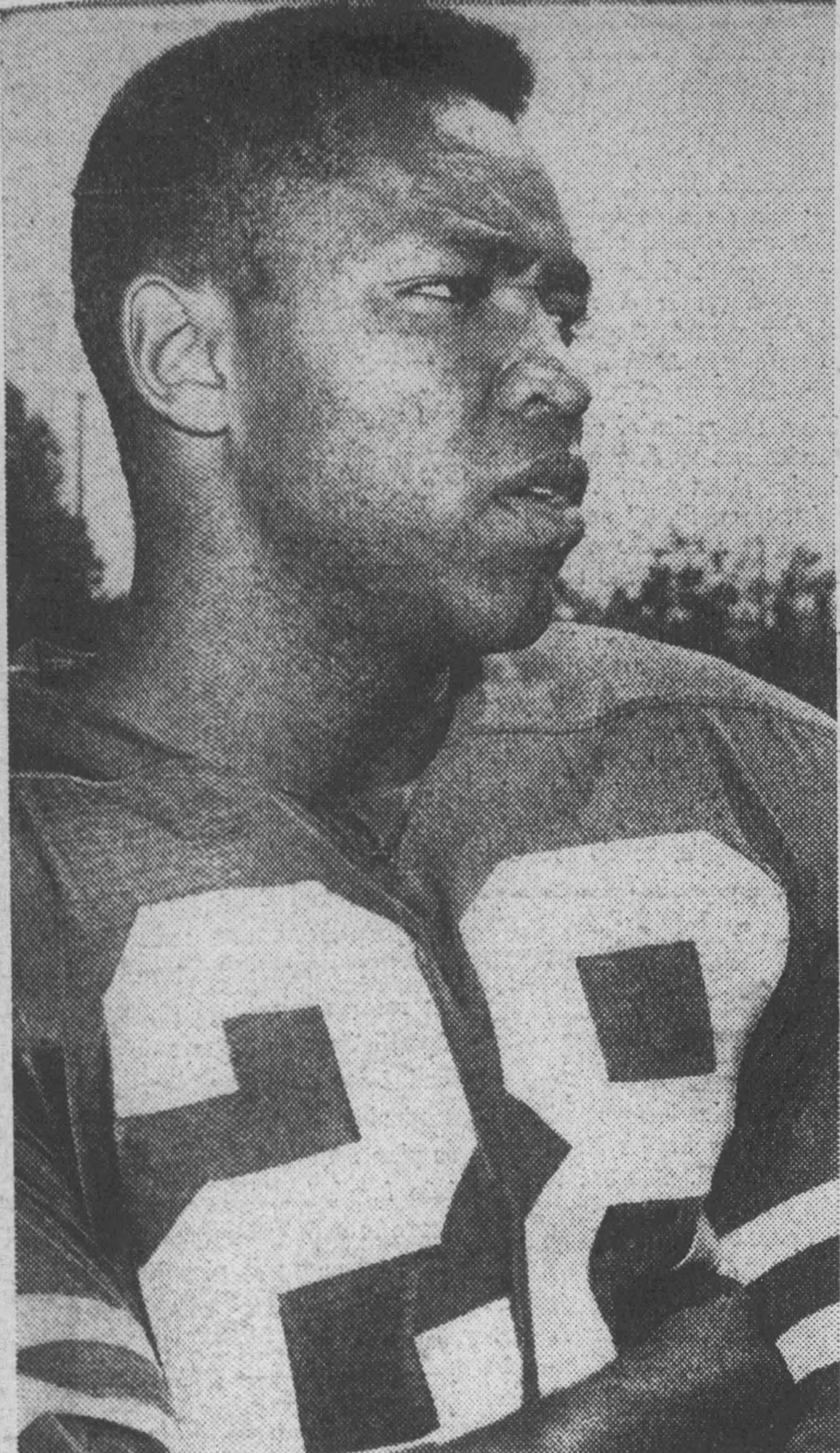
- Brown with the Los Angeles Rams in 1964

No. 26, 23
- Positions: Wide receiver, Halfback

Personal information
- Born: March 21, 1942; Tuscaloosa, Alabama, U.S.
- Died: July 26, 2018 (aged 76); Carson, California, U.S.
- Listed height: 6 ft 0 in (1.83 m)
- Listed weight: 188 lb (85 kg)

Career information
- High school: Long Beach Polytechnic (Long Beach, California)
- College: USC (1960–1963)
- NFL draft: 1964: 3rd round, 32nd overall pick
- AFL draft: 1964: 6th round, 48th overall pick

Career history

Playing
- Los Angeles Rams (1964–1965); Philadelphia Eagles (1966)

Coaching
- Tampa Bay Buccaneers (1976–1978) Wide receivers / running backs coach

Awards and highlights
- National champion (1962); First-team All-PCC (1963); Second-team All-PCC (1962)

Career NFL statistics
- Rushing yards: 133
- Rushing average: 3
- Receptions: 5
- Receiving yards: 110
- Total touchdowns: 1
- Stats at Pro Football Reference

Willie Brown (March 21, 1942 – July 26, 2018) was an American college and professional football player and coach. A star college football player for the USC Trojans, he went on to play three seasons in the National Football League (NFL). After his playing career, he served as a coach for the Trojans and the Tampa Bay Buccaneers of the NFL.

== Playing career ==
Brown played high school football at Long Beach Polytechnic High School, where he won the California Interscholastic Federation player of the year award in 1959.

Brown went on to play college football at the University of Southern California (USC). As he was a two-way player for the Trojans, he began as a tailback and kickoff returner but also played defensive back and flanker. In 1962, he led the Trojans, who went on to win the national championship, in rushing, kickoff returns and interceptions. In 1963, as the team captain, he led the team in receiving, scoring and interceptions.

He was also a standout baseball player, who was a center fielder and shortstop for the university's baseball team that won the 1963 College World Series.

In the 1964 NFL draft, the Los Angeles Rams selected him with the fourth pick of the third round, 32nd overall. He played two seasons with the Rams before finishing his playing career with the Philadelphia Eagles. He accumulated 133 rushing yards and 110 receiving yards in the NFL.

== Coaching career ==
Brown returned to USC as an assistant football coach from 1968 to 1975 and helped the Trojans win national championships in 1972 and 1974. He also served as a Trojan baseball assistant in 1969 and in 1970, when USC won the 1970 College World Series.

In 1976 and 1978, he went to the Tampa Bay Buccaneers where he served as the wide receivers coach and in 1977, the team's running backs coach. In his later years, Brown was an academic monitor for USC's Student-Athlete Academic Services from 1996 to 2016.

== Personal life ==
Brown had two brothers, Oscar and Ollie, both of whom played Major League Baseball. Ollie, who was the first pick by the San Diego Padres in the 1968 Major League Baseball expansion draft and was known as the “Original Padre”, died in 2015.

Brown died on July 26, 2018, in Carson, California, from cancer.
