= Gary Kirner =

American football player (born 1942)

No. 72
- Position: Guard

Personal information
- Born: June 22, 1942 (age 84); Los Angeles, California, U.S.
- Listed height: 6 ft 3 in (1.91 m)
- Listed weight: 264 lb (120 kg)

Career information
- High school: Alexander Hamilton (Los Angeles, California)
- College: Santa Monica; USC
- AFL draft: 1964: 5th round, 40th overall pick

Career history
- San Diego Chargers (1964–1969)

Awards and highlights
- National champion (1962); First-team All-PCC (1962, 1963); First-team all-Metropolitan Conference (1961)
- Stats at Pro Football Reference

Gary Burgess Kirner (born June 22, 1942) is an American former professional football player who was an offensive lineman for the San Diego Chargers of the American Football League (AFL). He played college football for the USC Trojans.

== Early life ==
Kirner was born on June 22, 1942, in Los Angeles, California. He attended Alexander Hamilton High School in Los Angeles, where he began playing football as a junior, lining up as a 6 ft 0 in (1.83 m), 175 lb (79 kg) tackle. Kirner also participated in track and field as a shot putter.

== College career ==
Kirner enrolled at Santa Monica City College (SMCC) in 1960. As a freshman, he joined the Corsairs football team and earned a letter as a starting right tackle. As a sophomore in 1961, Kirner earned first-team all-Metropolitan Conference honors and junior college All-America honorable mention. He also lettered in track and field at SMCC. Kirner transferred to the University of Southern California in the spring semester of 1961 to play for the Trojans, and won a national championship with the team in 1962. He was a first-team all-Pacific Coast Conference selection in 1962 and 1963 and played in both the East–West Shrine Bowl and the Hula Bowl.

== Professional career ==
Kirner was selected by the San Diego Chargers in the fifth round of the 1964 American Football League draft. He signed with the team in June 1964. Kirner was a "jack-of-all-trades lineman" until he settled at guard in 1968. He suffered a season-ending ankle injury in November 1969. Kirner spent a total of six seasons in San Diego, making 29 starts in 77 games played. On May 19, 1970, he was traded to the Cincinnati Bengals in exchange for Andy Rice. Kirner was subsequently cut by the Bengals on September 7.

== Personal life ==
His son, John, was born one day before Kirner's USC Trojans were selected to play in the 1963 Rose Bowl. He also had two daughters.
