= Stephen Underwood =

American drummer (born 1975)

- Born: Stephen Underwood; December 13, 1975 (age 50); Bakersfield, California, U.S.
- Genres: Southern Gospel, Christian Rock, Jazz, jazz fusion, Classical
- Instrument: Drums
- Years active: 1987–present
- Member of: The Lighthouse Boys
- Formerly of: Red Letter Edition; Blue Diamonds; Standard Warrior Band
- Website: Official Website

Stephen Underwood (born December 13, 1975, in Bakersfield, California) is an American drummer who has worked with several artists and musicians. He is best known for being drummer and vocalist for the Southern Gospel quartet The Lighthouse Boys. Stephen also spent two years with Standard Warrior Band from Standard Middle School in Bakersfield, CA, and a stent from 1996 to 2001 with the Watchmen Quartet on events like The Great Western Quartet Convention and The WSGMA Memorial Day and Labor Day Concerts. In 1999 Stephen was on stage with the Watchmen Quartet as they backed up the Legendary James Blackwood at the Great Western Quartet Convention at the Selland Arena in Fresno, CA. Stephen is also a studio drummer and currently records and performs with The Lighthouse Boys, Red Letter Edition and more recently Southern Gospel band Blue Diamonds from Long Beach, CA

== Discography ==
=== The Lighthouse Boys ===
- 1993 The Lighthouse Boys (TLB Records)
- 1994 Golden Classics (TLB Records) radio single "Midnight Cry"
- 1995 Rick Hendrix Radio Source 1995 Volume 1 (Rick Hendrix Company)
- 1995 WSGMA 20 Great Songs (WSGMA)
- 2000 Golden Classics 2 (TLB Records)
- 2002 I.A.M.M Volume 1 (International Association of Music Ministries)
- 2002 The Blood Will Never Lose Its Power - Single (TLB Records)
- 2002 Cathy Hollowell - I'll Be There (Oreely Multi-Media)
- 2003 After I Get to Heaven (TLB Records)
- 2005 The Best of The Lighthouse Boys 1974-2004 (TLB Records)
- 2010 Midnight Cry, The Essential Collection (TLB Records/Ultra Entertainment/Indie)
- 2014 Songs For Easter - Limited Edition Digital Compilation EP (TLB Records)
- 2015 From Heaven's Point of View - Single (TLB Records)
- 2016 The Lighthouse Boys - Ultimate Collection (TLB Records)

=== Red Letter Edition ===
- 2011 Wake Up! (RLE Ministries / STR Records)

=== Blue Diamonds ===
- 2013 Maiden Voyage (Indie)
