= Western States Gospel Music Association =

- Established: 1987-present
- Location: California, U.S.
- Website: www.wsgma.com

The Western States Gospel Music Association (WSGMA) is an organization based out of California, formed in the late 1980s to extend the acceptance, influence and use of traditional gospel music in churches throughout California, Oregon, Washington, Nevada and Arizona.

== Concerts & Music Production ==
The WSGMA hosts two or more concerts a Year. Two of these events celebrate Armed Forces Day (3rd Saturday of May in Orange County) and Labor Day (1st Monday of September in Stanislaus County). Each of these concerts showcase the artist groups individually along with a Gaither Style band and all artists gathered together to sing classic Southern Gospel hits and Patriotic Songs.

In 1994, the WSGMA released a Various Artists Cassette 10 Artists, 20 Songs with the Artist roster of that era. In 1997 the charter members at that time recorded a Live CD Live Reunion Recording which was produced by Dennis Zimmerman.

== President & Former Presidents of the WSGMA ==
- Randy Wold- Current President
- Herb Henry
- Dick Hillary
- Tim Williams
- Dennis Zimmerman

== Current Artist Roster for the WSGMA ==
- California Melody Boys
- Evidence Quartet
- Herb Henry Family
- Johnson Family Quartet
- The Lighthouse Boys
- Reliance
- The Roberts
- The Rykert Trio
- Solid Ground
- Songfellows Quartet
- Dick Hilleary (Chaplain)

== Former Artists of the WSGMA ==
- 4 His Love
- The Bravos
- The Californians
- Chosen Vision
- Circuit Riders
- The Cornells
- Crimson River Quartet
- Cross Roads New Revival
- Cross Roads Quartet
- Cullen & Co
- Golden State Quartet
- Goodnews Singers
- Gospel Truth Quartet
- The Gospelaires
- Grace Unlimited
- The Harrisons
- Harvest Time Quartet
- Heart's Desire
- Jericho Quartet
- The Johnson Family
- New Creations
- The Reflections
- The Regents of Southern California
- Reunion Quartet
- The Richland Trio
- Salt and Light Quartet
- Sevilles
- The Shaw Family (Citizens of Glory)
- Sister Christian
- Southern Journeymen
- Tradesmen
- Watchmen Quartet
- The Weatherfords
