= Randy Rich =

American football player (born 1953)

No. 31, 40, 27, 24
- Position: Defensive back

Personal information
- Born: December 28, 1953 (age 72); Bakersfield, California, U.S.
- Listed height: 5 ft 10 in (1.78 m)
- Listed weight: 178 lb (81 kg)

Career information
- High school: North (Bakersfield)
- College: New Mexico (1972–1975)
- NFL draft: 1976: undrafted

Career history
- Denver Broncos (1976)*; Detroit Lions (1977); Denver Broncos (1977); Oakland Raiders (1978); Cleveland Browns (1978–1979); Houston Oilers (1981)*
- * Offseason or practice squad member only
- Stats at Pro Football Reference

Randy Wayne Rich (born December 28, 1953) is an American former professional football defensive back who played three seasons in the National Football League (NFL) with the Detroit Lions, Denver Broncos, Oakland Raiders, and Cleveland Browns. He played college football at the University of New Mexico.

== Early life ==
Randy Wayne Rich was born on December 28, 1953, in Bakersfield, California. played high school football at North High School in Bakersfield and was on the varsity team for three years. He played running back and defensive back in high school while also returning punts and kicks. Rich rushed for over 2,400 yards in high school. He was on the junior varsity baseball team his freshman year and a letterman in track as a sophomore and junior.

== College career ==
Rich was a four-year letterman for the New Mexico Lobos of the University of New Mexico from 1972 to 1975. He was the first freshman to ever start in the Lobos' secondary. He led the country in punt returns his senior year.

== Professional career ==
Rich signed with the Denver Broncos after going undrafted in the 1976 NFL draft. He was released on September 7, 1976.

Rich then signed with the Detroit Lions in 1977. He played in two games for the Lions during the 1977 season, returning five kicks for 73 yards and two punts for 18 yards. He was released on September 27, 1977.

Rich was signed by the Denver Broncos on December 15, 1977. He appeared in three postseason games for the Broncos during the 1977 season. He was released on August 30, 1978.

Rich signed with the Oakland Raiders on September 14, 1978. He played in two games for the Raiders before being released on September 25, 1978.

Rich was signed by the Cleveland Browns on October 18, 1978. He played in nine games for the Browns in 1978, returning two kicks for 43 yards while also recovering one fumble. He appeared in all 16 games for the Browns in 1979 and recorded two kick returns for ten yards. Rich was released on September 2, 1980.

Rich signed with the Houston Oilers on May 16, 1981. He was later released on August 18, 1981.

== Post-playing career ==
Rich was the president and general manager of the Christian radio station, KLYT, for 18 years. He was inducted into the Bob Elias Kern County Sports Hall of Fame in 1996. He was also later inducted into the North High School Athletics Hall of Fame.
