= 1963 USC Trojans football team =

American college football season

1963 USC Trojans football
- Conference: Athletic Association of Western Universities

Ranking
- Coaches: No. 16
- Record: 7–3 (3–1 AAWU)
- Head coach: John McKay (4th season)
- Captains: Pete Beathard; Willie Brown
- Home stadium: Los Angeles Memorial Coliseum

1963 Athletic Association of Western Universities football standings
	Conf.					Overall
Team	W		L		T	W		L		T
Washington $	4	–	1	–	0	6	–	5	–	0
USC	3	–	1	–	0	7	–	3	–	0
UCLA	2	–	2	–	0	2	–	8	–	0
Washington State	1	–	1	–	0	3	–	6	–	1
California	1	–	3	–	0	4	–	5	–	1
Stanford	1	–	4	–	0	3	–	7	–	0
$ – Conference champion

The 1963 USC Trojans football team represented the University of Southern California (USC) in the 1963 NCAA University Division football season. In their fourth year under head coach John McKay, the Trojans compiled a 7–3 record (3–1 against conference opponents), finished second in the Athletic Association of Western Universities (AAWU or Big 6), and outscored their opponents 207 to 114.

Quarterback Pete Beathard was one of the two team captains and led the Trojans, completing 66 of 140 passes for 944 yards with five touchdowns and seven interceptions. Mike Garrett led the team in rushing with 128 carries for 833 yards, and co-captain Willie Brown led USC in receiving with 34 catches for 448 yards.

== Schedule ==
Date	Opponent	Rank	Site	Result	Attendance	Source
September 21	at Colorado*	No. 1	Folsom Field; Boulder, CO	W 14–0	27,000	
September 28	No. 3 Oklahoma*	No. 1	Los Angeles Memorial Coliseum; Los Angeles, CA	L 12–17	39,345	
October 4	Michigan State*	No. 8	Los Angeles Memorial Coliseum; Los Angeles, CA	W 13–10	59,137	
October 12	at Notre Dame*	No. 7	Notre Dame Stadium; Notre Dame, IN (rivalry)	L 14–17	59,135	
October 19	No. 4 Ohio State*		Los Angeles Memorial Coliseum; Los Angeles, CA	W 32–3	61,883	
October 26	at California		California Memorial Stadium; Berkeley, CA	W 36–6	41,000	
November 2	at Washington		Husky Stadium; Seattle, WA	L 7–22	55,800	
November 9	Stanford^{†}		Los Angeles Memorial Coliseum; Los Angeles, CA (rivalry)	W 25–11	57,035	
November 15	Oregon State*		Los Angeles Memorial Coliseum; Los Angeles, CA	W 28–22	30,846	
November 30	UCLA		Los Angeles Memorial Coliseum; Los Angeles, CA (Victory Bell)	W 26–6	82,460	
*Non-conference game; ^{†}Homecoming; Rankings from AP Poll released prior to the game; Source:

- The final regular season game (UCLA) was postponed a week following the assassination of President Kennedy.
