= 1963 Washington State Cougars football team =

American college football season

1963 Washington State Cougars football
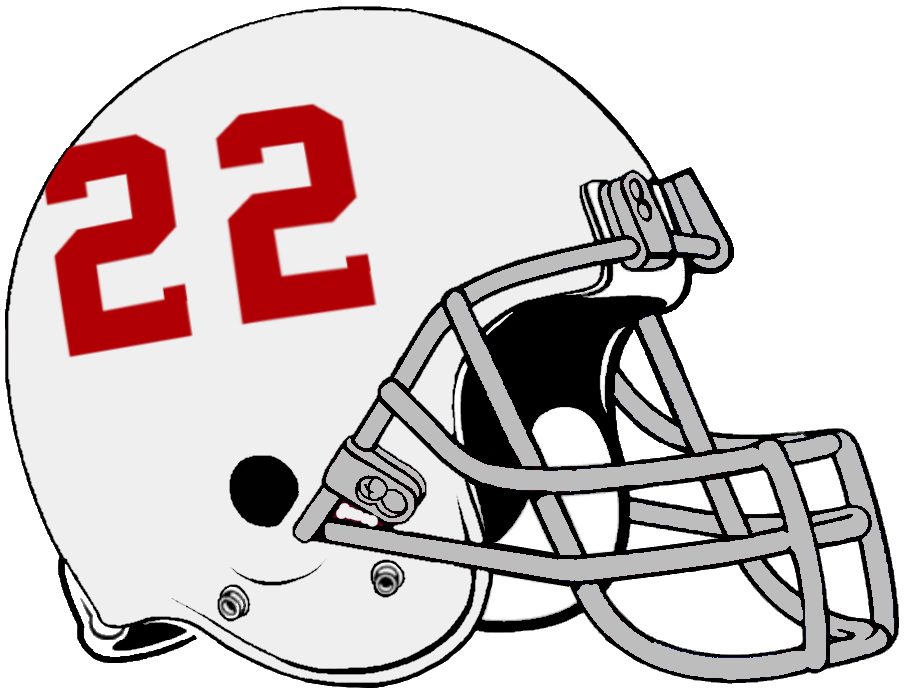
- Conference: Athletic Association of Western Universities
- Record: 3–6–1 (1–1 AAWU)
- Head coach: Jim Sutherland (8th season)
- Home stadium: Rogers Field, Joe Albi Stadium

1963 Athletic Association of Western Universities football standings
	Conf.					Overall
Team	W		L		T	W		L		T
Washington $	4	–	1	–	0	6	–	5	–	0
USC	3	–	1	–	0	7	–	3	–	0
UCLA	2	–	2	–	0	2	–	8	–	0
Washington State	1	–	1	–	0	3	–	6	–	1
California	1	–	3	–	0	4	–	5	–	1
Stanford	1	–	4	–	0	3	–	7	–	0
$ – Conference champion

The 1963 Washington State Cougars football team was an American football team that represented Washington State University in the Athletic Association of Western Universities (AAWU) during the 1963 NCAA University Division football season. In their eighth and final season under head coach Jim Sutherland, the Cougars compiled a 3–6–1 record (1–1 in AAWU, fourth), and were outscored 160 to 95.

The team's statistical leaders included Dave Mathieson with 859 passing yards, Clancy Williams with 523 rushing yards, and Gerry Shaw with 409 receiving yards.

Sutherland voluntarily stepped down in December with a year remaining on his contract, and later owned several automobile dealerships in Spokane. He was succeeded at WSU in January 1964 by Bert Clark, an assistant at rival Washington under Jim Owens.

== Schedule ==
Date	Time	Opponent	Site	Result	Attendance	Source
September 21		at Texas Tech*	Jones Stadium; Lubbock, TX	L 7–16	31,500	
September 28		at Iowa*	Iowa Stadium; Iowa City, IA	T 14–14	52,600	
October 5	8:00 p.m.	Arizona*	Joe Albi Stadium; Spokane, WA	W 7–2	18,200	
October 12		San Jose State*	Rogers Field; Pullman, WA	L 8–13	19,500	
October 19		at Oregon State*	Parker Stadium; Corvallis, OR	L 6–30	17,810	
October 26		at Army*	Michie Stadium; West Point, NY	L 0–23	31,200	
November 2	1:30 p.m.	Idaho*	Rogers Field; Pullman, WA (Battle of the Palouse)	W 14–10	18,500	
November 9	1:30 p.m.	Oregon*^{†}	Rogers Field; Pullman, WA	L 7–21	13,000	
November 16		at Stanford	Stanford Stadium; Stanford, CA	W 32–15	27,500	
November 30		at Washington	Husky Stadium; Seattle, WA (Apple Cup)	L 0–16	56,000	
*Non-conference game; ^{†}Homecoming; All times are in Pacific time; Source:

- The final game of the season was delayed a week following the assassination of John F. Kennedy.

== NFL draft ==
Two Cougars were selected in the 1964 NFL draft, which was 20 rounds and 280 selections.

Player	Position	Round	Overall	Franchise
Kenny Graham	Back / End	12	162	Baltimore Colts
Glenn Baker	Tackle	13	178	Pittsburgh Steelers
