= 1963 Stanford Indians football team =

American college football season

1963 Stanford Indians football
- Conference: Athletic Association of Western Universities
- Record: 3–7 (1–4 AAWU)
- Head coach: John Ralston (1st season)
- Home stadium: Stanford Stadium

1963 Athletic Association of Western Universities football standings
	Conf.					Overall
Team	W		L		T	W		L		T
Washington $	4	–	1	–	0	6	–	5	–	0
USC	3	–	1	–	0	7	–	3	–	0
UCLA	2	–	2	–	0	2	–	8	–	0
Washington State	1	–	1	–	0	3	–	6	–	1
California	1	–	3	–	0	4	–	5	–	1
Stanford	1	–	4	–	0	3	–	7	–	0
$ – Conference champion

The 1963 Stanford Indians football team represented Stanford University in the 1963 NCAA University Division football season. The team was led by first-year head coach John Ralston. Ralston succeeded Jack Curtice, who had been fired at the end of the previous season. The team played home games at Stanford Stadium in Stanford, California.

== Schedule ==
Date	Opponent	Site	Result	Attendance	Source
September 21	San Jose State*	Stanford Stadium; Stanford, CA (rivalry)	W 29–13	31,000	
September 28	Oregon*	Stanford Stadium; Stanford, CA	L 7–36	31,000	
October 5	UCLA	Stanford Stadium; Stanford, CA	L 9–10	21,000	
October 12	at Rice*	Rice Stadium; Houston, TX	L 13–23	30,000	
October 19	at Washington	Husky Stadium; Seattle, WA	L 11–19	54,000	
October 26	Notre Dame*	Stanford Stadium; Stanford, CA (rivalry)	W 24–14	55,000	
November 2	at Oregon State*	Parker Stadium; Corvallis, OR	L 7–10	17,697	
November 9	at USC	Los Angeles Memorial Coliseum; Los Angeles, CA (rivalry)	L 11–25	57,035	
November 16	Washington State	Stanford Stadium; Stanford, CA	L 15–32	27,500	
November 30 (Note: Rescheduled from November 23 following the Kennedy assassination.)	California	Stanford Stadium; Stanford, CA (Big Game)	W 28–17	82,000	
*Non-conference game; Source:

== Game summaries ==
=== California ===
Team	1	2	3	4	Total
California	3	0	14	0	17
• Stanford	0	3	12	13	28

- Date: November 30
- Location: Stanford Stadium
- Game attendance: 82,000

Scoring summary
1	CAL	Tom Blanchfield 37-yard field goal	CAL 3–0
2	STAN	Braden Beck 36-yard field goal	Tied 3–3
3	STAN	Steve Thurlow 5-yard run (run failed)	STAN 9–3
3	CAL	Jim Blakeney 7-yard run (Tom Blanchfield kick)	CAL 10–9
3	CAL	Tom Blanchfield 69-yard punt return (Tom Blanchfield kick)	CAL 17–9
3	STAN	Ken Babajian 1-yard run (run failed)	CAL 17–15
4	STAN	Braden Beck 48-yard field goal	STAN 18–17
3	STAN	Steve Thurlow 5-yard run (Braden Beck kick)	STAN 25–17
4	STAN	Braden Beck 46-yard field goal	STAN 28–17

The 66th Big Game was scheduled for November 23, but after the assassination of John F. Kennedy, like nearly all sporting events, the game was canceled and rescheduled for the following week. Stanford was winless in the conference coming into the game, and following a California punt return for a touchdown, were behind their rival 17–9 late in the second half. But the Indians fought back, scoring the last 19 points in the game on two touchdowns and two field goals to win the game.

== Roster ==
1963 Stanford Cardinal football team roster
Players
Coaches
Offense

Pos.	#	Name	Class
		Steve Thurlow	Sr
OL		Marvin Harris	Sr
FB		Ray Handley	So

Defense

Pos.	#	Name	Class
LB		Jack Chapple	Jr
DT		Gary Pettigrew	So
DB		Richard Ragsdale	Jr

Special teams

Pos.	#	Name	Class

Head coach

- John Ralston

Coordinators/assistant coaches

- Dutch Fehring – Assistant
- Bob Gambold – Assistant
- Robert Jones – Assistant
- Leon McLaughlin – Assistant
- Rod Rust – Assistant
- Bill Walsh – Defensive backs

Legend

- (C) Team captain
- (S) Suspended
- (I) Ineligible
- Injured
- Redshirt

== Players drafted by the NFL/AFL ==
Player	Position	Round	Pick	NFL/AFL Club (Note: AFL Draft selections shown in italics.)
Steve Thurlow	Running back	2	25	New York Giants
Bob Nichols	Tackle	9/18	122/142	Pittsburgh Steelers/Houston Oilers (Note: Signed with Pittsburgh.)
Dick Leeuwenburg	Tackle	11/17	154/134	Chicago Bears/Houston Oilers (Note: Signed with Chicago.)
Marv Harris	Linebacker	13	175	Los Angeles Rams
