= 1963 UCLA Bruins football team =

American college football season

1963 UCLA Bruins football
- Conference: Athletic Association of Western Universities
- Record: 2–8 (2–2 AAWU)
- Head coach: Bill Barnes (6th season)
- Home stadium: Los Angeles Memorial Coliseum

1963 Athletic Association of Western Universities football standings
	Conf.					Overall
Team	W		L		T	W		L		T
Washington $	4	–	1	–	0	6	–	5	–	0
USC	3	–	1	–	0	7	–	3	–	0
UCLA	2	–	2	–	0	2	–	8	–	0
Washington State	1	–	1	–	0	3	–	6	–	1
California	1	–	3	–	0	4	–	5	–	1
Stanford	1	–	4	–	0	3	–	7	–	0
$ – Conference champion

The 1963 UCLA Bruins football team was an American football team that represented the University of California, Los Angeles during the 1963 NCAA University Division football season. In their sixth year under head coach Bill Barnes, the Bruins compiled a 2–8 record (2–2 AAWU) and finished in third place in the Athletic Association of Western Universities.

UCLA's offensive leaders in 1963 were quarterback Larry Zeno with 1,036 passing yards, Jim Colletto with 179 rushing yards, and Kurt Altenberg with 419 receiving yards.

== Schedule ==
Date	Opponent	Site	Result	Attendance	Source
September 20	Pittsburgh	Los Angeles Memorial Coliseum; Los Angeles, CA	L 0–20	28,095	
September 28	at Penn State*	Beaver Stadium; University Park, PA	L 14–17	34,800	
October 5	at Stanford	Stanford Stadium; Stanford, CA	W 10–9	21,000	
October 11	Syracuse*	Los Angeles Memorial Coliseum; Los Angeles, CA	L 7–29	22,949	
October 19	at Notre Dame*	Notre Dame Stadium; Notre Dame, IN	L 12–27	42,948	
October 25	No. 4 Illinois*	Los Angeles Memorial Coliseum; Los Angeles, CA	L 12–18	24,616	
November 2	California	Los Angeles Memorial Coliseum; Los Angeles, CA (rivalry)	L 0–25	32,711	
November 9	at Air Force*	Falcon Stadium; Colorado Springs, CO	L 21–48	31,937	
November 16	Washington	Los Angeles Memorial Coliseum; Los Angeles, CA	W 14–0	30,398	
November 30	at USC	Los Angeles Memorial Coliseum; Los Angeles, CA (Victory Bell)	L 6–26	82,460	
*Non-conference game; Rankings from AP Poll released prior to the game; Source:

- The final regular season game (USC) was postponed a week following the assassination of President Kennedy.
