= Standard School District =

School district in California, United States

Address
- 1200 North Chester Avenue Bakersfield, California, 93308; United States

District information
- Type: Public school district
- Motto: Setting the STANDARD for Excellence in Public Education
- Grades: K-8
- Established: 1909
- Superintendent: Paul Meyers
- Schools: 4
- Budget: $29 M
- NCES District ID: 0637890

Students and staff
- Students: 2,913
- Teachers: 143.0 (FTE)
- Staff: 178.18 (FTE)
- Student–teacher ratio: 20.37:1

Other information
- Schedule: Nine-month
- Website: www.standardschools.net

Standard School District is a Kindergarten - 8th grade public school district in Oildale, California. The district has four schools, and serves the Northeast Bakersfield area. The district is a feeder district to the Kern High School District.
