= 1963 California Golden Bears football team =

American college football season

1963 California Golden Bears football
- Conference: Athletic Association of Western Universities
- Record: 4–5–1 (1–3 AAWU)
- Head coach: Marv Levy (4th season)
- Home stadium: California Memorial Stadium

1963 Athletic Association of Western Universities football standings
	Conf.					Overall
Team	W		L		T	W		L		T
Washington $	4	–	1	–	0	6	–	5	–	0
USC	3	–	1	–	0	7	–	3	–	0
UCLA	2	–	2	–	0	2	–	8	–	0
Washington State	1	–	1	–	0	3	–	6	–	1
California	1	–	3	–	0	4	–	5	–	1
Stanford	1	–	4	–	0	3	–	7	–	0
$ – Conference champion

The 1963 California Golden Bears football team was an American football team that represented the University of California, Berkeley in the Athletic Association of Western Universities (AAWU) during the 1963 NCAA University Division football season. In its fourth year under head coach Marv Levy, the Golden Bears compiled a 4–5–1 record (1–3 in AAWU, fifth) and were outscored 213 to 195. Home games were played on campus at California Memorial Stadium in Berkeley, California.

California's statistical leaders on offense were junior quarterback Craig Morton with 1,475 passing yards, Tom Blanchfield with 387 rushing yards, and Jack Schraub with 467 receiving yards. Morton was later inducted into the College Football Hall of Fame.

== Schedule ==
Date	Opponent	Site	Result	Attendance	Source
September 21	Iowa State*	California Memorial Stadium; Berkeley, CA	W 15–8	31,500	
September 28	at Illinois*	Memorial Stadium; Champaign, IL	L 0–10	42,357	
October 5	at No. 9 Pittsburgh*	Pitt Stadium; Pittsburgh, PA	L 15–35	22,091	
October 12	Duke*	California Memorial Stadium; Berkeley, CA	T 22–22	36,000	
October 19	San Jose State*	California Memorial Stadium; Berkeley, CA	W 34–13	37,000	
October 26	USC	California Memorial Stadium; Berkeley, CA	L 6–36	41,000	
November 2	at UCLA	Los Angeles Memorial Coliseum; Los Angeles, CA (rivalry)	W 25–0	32,711	
November 9	Washington	California Memorial Stadium; Berkeley, CA	L 26–39	37,000	
November 16	at Utah*	Ute Stadium; Salt Lake City, UT	W 35–22	13,974	
November 30	at Stanford	Stanford Stadium; Stanford, CA (Big Game)	L 17–28	82,000	
*Non-conference game; Rankings from AP Poll released prior to the game; Source:

The final regular season game (Stanford) was postponed a week following the Assassination of John F. Kennedy.

== Roster ==
1963 California Golden Bears football team roster
Players			Coaches
Offense: Pos. / # / Name / Class; QB / / Craig Morton / Jr	Defense: Pos. / # / Name / Class	Special teams: Pos. / # / Name / Class	Head coach: Marv Levy; Coordinators/assistant coaches: Dick Stanfel (OL); Legend: (C) Team captain; (S) Suspended; (I) Ineligible; Injured; Redshirt
