= 1963 Washington Huskies football team =

American college football season

1963 Washington Huskies football

AAWU champion

Rose Bowl, L 7–17 vs. Illinois
- Conference: Athletic Association of Western Universities

Ranking
- Coaches: No. 15
- Record: 6–5 (4–1 AAWU)
- Head coach: Jim Owens (7th season)
- Captains: Dave Kopay; John Stupey
- Home stadium: University of Washington Stadium

1963 Athletic Association of Western Universities football standings
	Conf.					Overall
Team	W		L		T	W		L		T
Washington $	4	–	1	–	0	6	–	5	–	0
USC	3	–	1	–	0	7	–	3	–	0
UCLA	2	–	2	–	0	2	–	8	–	0
Washington State	1	–	1	–	0	3	–	6	–	1
California	1	–	3	–	0	4	–	5	–	1
Stanford	1	–	4	–	0	3	–	7	–	0
$ – Conference champion

The 1963 Washington Huskies football team was an American football team that represented the University of Washington during the 1963 NCAA University Division football season. Under seventh-year head coach Jim Owens, the team lost their first three games, compiled a 6–4 record in the regular season, and won the Athletic Association of Western Universities (AAWU, a.k.a. "Big Six") at 4–1.

On New Year's Day at the Rose Bowl, the Huskies led early but lost 17–7 to third-ranked Illinois. It was the third Rose Bowl for Washington under Owens and their first loss; they had won consecutive games in January 1960 and 1961. The Huskies did not return to Pasadena for fourteen years, a victory in January 1978 in head coach Don James' third season.

Halfback Dave Kopay and center John Stupey were the team captains. In its eleven games, Washington outscored its opponents 183 to 141.

== Schedule ==
Date	Opponent	Rank	Site	Result	Attendance	Source
September 21	at Air Force*	No. 10	Falcon Stadium; Colorado Springs, CO	L 7–10	23,542	
September 28	at No. 10 Pittsburgh*		Pitt Stadium; Pittsburgh, PA	L 6–13	37,136	
October 5	Iowa*		University of Washington Stadium; Seattle, WA	L 7–17	55,200	
October 12	Oregon State*		University of Washington Stadium; Seattle, WA	W 34–7	53,700	
October 19	Stanford		University of Washington Stadium; Seattle, WA	W 19–11	54,000	
October 26	at Oregon*		Multnomah Stadium; Portland (rivalry)	W 26–19	35,690	
November 2	USC		University of Washington Stadium; Seattle, WA	W 22–7	55,800	
November 9	at California		California Memorial Stadium; Berkeley, CA	W 39–26	37,000	
November 16	at UCLA		Los Angeles Memorial Coliseum; Los Angeles, CA	L 0–14	30,398	
November 30	Washington State		University of Washington Stadium; Seattle, WA (Apple Cup)	W 16–0	56,000	
January 1, 1964	vs. No. 3 Illinois*		Rose Bowl; Pasadena, CA (Rose Bowl)	L 7–17	96,957	
*Non-conference game; Rankings from AP Poll released prior to the game; Source:

- The final regular season game (Apple Cup) was postponed a week following the assassination of President Kennedy.

== Professional football draft selections ==
Two University of Washington Huskies were selected in the 1964 NFL draft, which lasted 20 rounds with 280 selections. One Husky was selected in the 1964 AFL draft, which lasted 26 rounds with 208 selections.

= Husky Hall of Fame

League	Player	Position	Round	Pick	Franchise
NFL	Jake Kupp	Guard	9	4	Dallas Cowboys
NFL	Rick Sortun	Guard	12	10	St. Louis Cardinals
AFL	Jerry Knoll	Tackle	18	2	Kansas City Chiefs
