= Rick Sortun =

American football player (1942–2015)

No. 66
- Position: Guard

Personal information
- Born: September 26, 1942; Tacoma, Washington, U.S.
- Died: November 3, 2015 (aged 73); Seattle, Washington, U.S.
- Listed height: 6 ft 2 in (1.88 m)
- Listed weight: 235 lb (107 kg)

Career information
- High school: Kent-Meridan (Kent, Washington)
- College: Washington (1960-1963)
- NFL draft: 1964: 12th round, 164th overall pick

Career history
- St. Louis Cardinals (1964–1969)

Awards and highlights
- Second-team All-PCC (1963)

Career NFL statistics
- Games played: 82
- Games started: 23
- Fumble recoveries: 2
- Stats at Pro Football Reference

Henrik Martin "Rick" Sortun (September 26, 1942 – November 3, 2015) was an American professional football player who was an offensive lineman for six seasons for the St. Louis Cardinals.

In his personal life, he was a committed Marxist, a member of the International Socialists, and a long-running president of the National Labor Relations Board Union.
