= The Lighthouse Boys =

American Southern Gospel band

- (L-R) Mark Underwood, Steve Johnson, Stephen Underwood, Jimmy Woods, Tommy Smith, Bill Underwood

Background information
- Origin: Bakersfield, California, U.S.
- Genres: Southern Gospel
- Years active: 1974–present
- Members: Mark Underwood; Stephen Underwood
- Past members: Steve Johnson; Bill Undewrood; Tim Cantu; Dathan Fernandez; Ken Edwards; Jon Edwards; Hearl Smith; Jerry Guyette; Tim McMahon; Butch Hall; LeeDon Essmon; Roxanne Chambers Strait; Rick Stalnaker; Ted McClaren; Terry Mullin; Tim Williams; Mike Smith; Kenny Knight; Gary Miller; Frank McNinch; Jeff Edwards; Joe Underwood; Tommy Smith; Jimmy Woods; Duane Meadows; Carl Barber; Randy Ivie; Lee Hulbert; Mike Tweedy; Ronnie Pack; Cal Brewer
- Website: TheLighthouseBoys.com

The Lighthouse Boys are an American Southern Gospel band from Bakersfield, California, and progenitors of "The Bakersfield Sound". The group began in 1974 by brothers Mark and Bill Underwood and Bill's brother in-law Steve Johnson. In 1976, the trio expanded from a vocal ensemble to a full band with the addition of Frank McNinch, Garry Miller, and Kenny Knight. The band recorded their self-titled debut album in the late 1970s and released it in 1980. The band has undergone many line-up changes throughout their recording and touring careers, but the core trio has remained at the helm during their history.

== Career / Ministry ==
=== Founding and early years ===
Founded in 1974 in Bakersfield, California by Mark Underwood and Steve Johnson, who had been writing songs together since in 1973. Mark's older brother Bill Underwood would soon join and they began performing all around California. May 26, 1974, Mark Underwood was part of the Foothill High School 40 Voice Choir & Orchestra when they were booked to do a concert with the Jesus music band Amplified Version, Mark took the opportunity to talk with them, and they convinced Mark that for The Lighthouse Boys to continue successfully they needed to get a sound system to take with them on the road. That same year a sound system was purchased.

In March 1975, The Lighthouse Boys made their first TV appearance locally on the March of Dimes Telerama with Susan Raye, Billy Mize and many others, the Televised event took place between Los Angeles, CA and Bakersfield, CA.

In 1977 The Lighthouse Boys became a full quartet when Frank McNinch joined on bass vocals to fill out the sound. They also added Garry Miller on bass guitar and Kenny Knight on drums to fill out the rest of the band.

On April 29, 1978, The Lighthouse Boys performed on the talent show at the Gospelaires 17th Annual Homecoming at the Selland Arena in Fresno, California with The Blackwood Brothers and Voyagers Quartet. On June 30, 1978, The Lighthouse Boys entered Buck Owens' Recording Studio on North Chester in Bakersfield to record five of the songs that would go on their debut record. Jim Shaw who produced the album was later quoted as saying "They were fun sessions. I just remember they had a nice, gospel-flavored country sound and that we enjoyed working with The Lighthouse Boys"

1979 The Lighthouse Boys were beginning to be promoted in the central valley and desert area quite a bit, however, change would happen again as Frank, Gary and Kenny left. Steve Johnson stepped away for a short time. Mark Underwood attended a Benny Hester Concert in Bakersfield, CA where he met two musicians who were cousins. Tim Cantu (Drummer) and Daythen Fernandez (Guitar). Steve Johnson returned and The Lighthouse Boys once again started to get very busy. Coy Edwards who built and founded a Bakersfield Radio Station that went on to become KHIS was the brother to Lois Gibbons a Gospel Music Promoter and Owner of a News Publication on the west coast called The Gospel Music Roundup, Coy took an interest in promoting The Lighthouse Boys in the central valley and Desert Area. The Coy Edwards Family and The Lighthouse Boys would do several concerts together, Coy's son Ken Edwards would often fill in on Bass Guitar. By the end of 1979, Ken Edwards and his brother Jon Edwards joined The Lighthouse Boys, Steve Johnson would soon step down for personal reasons.

=== The 80's ===
February 8, 1980 The Lighthouse Boys would take the stage with June Wade & The Country Congregation, The Edwards and Gary Felton for a benefit concert in Victorville, CA, it would be the first with the new six man line up before hitting a busier schedule. May 25, 1980 they made an appearance at the Western Desert Gospel Sing at the San Bernardino Fair Grounds in Victorville, CA, they recorded a live album that day, and performed on the same stage where then former Governor Ronald Regan was appearing as part of his campaign to become President of the United States. In June, they finally released their debut album. They stayed busy as they could purchasing a Bus and making appearances with several artists up and down the west, in September and October they made appearances at the Calico Ghost Town and in November at the Western States Quartet Convention in Upland, CA, The Lighthouse Boys won the "Californians Choice Awards for Best Band". The Lighthouse Boys had become one of the top artists in the west.

Towards the end of 1980, Ken and Jon Edwards left and Steve Johnson returned, by December Jerry Guyette, who Mark nicknamed "Germ" joined on Bass Guitar. By 1981 The Lighthouse Boys started going through a rotation in members, Tim McMahon joined as a vocalist. Then in 1982, Mark, Bill and Steve met Butch and Roxanne Hall, soon a Steel Guitarest by the name of LeeDon Essman came and made a proposal to start a mixed group, Mark, Steve and Bill with Butch and Roxan joined up with LeeDon and added Rick Stalnaker on Drums and called themselves New Covenant. New Covenant recorded three songs, two of which were released on a Sampler LP for what was known as The Western Gospel Association. However, by September 1983, New Covenant was disbanding, Tim Cantu had returned to fill in on drums to finish out their commitments.

=== 10 ===
In 1984 The Lighthouse Boys regrouped with Mark Underwood, Steve Johnson (on bass vocals), Bill Underwood, Ken Edwards and Tim Cantu. They returned to the Kern County Fair with June Wade and The Country Congregation. The Lighthouse Boys also committed to a gospel benefit concert with the Raye Sisters and Susan Raye for the purpose of funding the Bakersfield Country Museum. They also made another local TV appearance in Bakersfield on the local broadcast of The Jerry Lewis MDA Telethon. Mark and Steve continued to write songs. The group continued to make appearances on local TV programs and various annual events, Mark spent some time with a group out of Taft, CA called "Sunrise." On Memorial Day 1987 The Lighthouse Boys made an appearance performing three sets over two stages at The High Desert Gospel Sing at the San Bernardino Fair Grounds in Victorville, CA. Shortly after, Steve Johnson stepped away. In July The Lighthouse Boys entered the studio again to cut a new single that was originally planned to be given to Jimmy Swaggart, instead it sparked a desire to re-emerge on the road, this time joined on drums by Bill's son Stephen Underwood. Questions were circulating if The Lighthouse Boys were going to hit the road again.

=== The 90's ===
In 1989, Mark Underwood, Bill Underwood, Ken Edwards and Stephen Underwood met at Ken Edward's house to make the discission that The Lighthouse Boys would be returning to the road. The Lighthouse Boys announced via the west coast publication that they were "On the Road Again." In 1989, Mark Underwood, Steve Johnson & Ken Edwards signed a one-year contract as writers with a publishing company. The Lighthouse Boys went into the studio to record 6 songs, but soon after the recording Ken Edwards took time away to help his father's radio station in Dry Prong, Louisiana. A young man by the name of Terry Mullin joined as lead singer. The Lighthouse Boys recorded backup vocals for soloist Debra Hoopiiaina on her album "Bought With A Price." In 1993 after Ken Edwards' return and a move down to bass vocals for Terry, The Lighthouse Boys released the previous six songs recorded from 1989 as a compilation album with five songs from their first album.

=== 20 ===
In 1994, The Lighthouse Boys went back into the studio where they felt at home: Fat Tracks - formerly Buck Owens Recording Studio. They joined the Western States Gospel Music Association and hit a Northwest US tour in the summer and released their third studio album, Golden Classics. On December 31, 1994, while The Lighthouse Boys celebrated their 20th anniversary, the original quartet Mark Underwood, Steve Johnson, Bill Underwood and Frank McNinch reunited for one concert in which they performed five songs from their first album.

In 1995 The Lighthouse Boys released the radio single "Midnight Cry" through the Rick Hendrix Company. Between 1995 and 1997 they toured the Northwest and Southern parts of the United States. In October 1997 they made an afternoon showcase appearance at Suwannee River Jubilee held in Live Oak, Florida. The fans were so enthused by the performance The Lighthouse Boys were asked to perform on the evening show. The quartet also began performing annually at The Great Western Quartet Convention (a "spin-off" event from the National Quartet Convention).

In 1998 Mark temporarily lost his voice, a young man by the name of Tim Williams had just stepped down as music minister at his home Church at Northland Assembly of God in Bakersfield, CA. Tim was originally joining to play keyboards, but because of Mark's vocal health, Mark continued playing keyboards and Tim took over singing Tenor.

=== 2000's ===
In March 2000, The Lighthouse Boys released Golden Classics 2. In October after 20 years with The Lighthouse Boys, Ken Edwards left the group. Terry Mullin and Tim Williams left as well to reform Golden State Quartet. In 2001, original member Steve Johnson stepped back in, Stephen Underwood moved from the Drums to Lead Vocalist and The Lighthouse Boys set back out on the road. In 2002, they met up with producer Mark Yeary and recorded the single "The Blood Will Never Lose Its Power." The song was recorded for a special compilation project called IAMM Volume 1. They also guest appeared on the album I'll Be There by Mark Yeary's sister, Cathy Hollowell.

=== 30 ===
In February 2004, the group celebrated their 30th anniversary. In the summer of that year, their keyboardist Mike Smith was found by his bike after falling asleep while driving home from work. He had run off the road in the hills outside of Santa Maria.

In October, Bill Underwood left the road to pastor a church. Mark brought up his son Joe Underwood to sing baritone, they continued with Stephen Underwood as a trio until they briefly shut down in December 2005.

In 2006 Mark, Steve, Bill & Stephen came back together to perform limited concert dates, their first concert back was the 2006 Great Western Southern Gospel Fan Festival at The Save Mart Center in Fresno, California. They again performed there in 2007. In 2008, The Lighthouse Boys went live again for the first time in four years with the addition of Tommy Smith; a veteran Bass Guitarist who had played with the likes of Bobby Durham, Brian Lonbeck, Mark Yeary and The Buckaroos.

=== 2010's ===
In December 2009 Stephen Underwood returned to the Drums, and Ken Edwards stepped back in to sing lead. April 29, 2010, The Lighthouse Boys returned to the Great Western Fan Fest and released Midnight Cry: The Lighthouse Boys Essential Collection, a 20-song compilation celebrating the years from 1994 to 2000. On October 30, 2010, for the first time in 10 years, The Lighthouse Boys reunited the most popular version of the group with members Mark Underwood, Bill Underwood, Ken Edwards, Terry Mullin and Stephen Underwood for their entire set during the final 5th Saturday Sing of the year. Tim Williams also joined them on 2 songs.

In December 2012, Jimmy Woods (son of Bakersfield Country Music Legend, Bill Woods) joined The Lighthouse Boys on keyboards. The Lighthouse Boys returned to The Great Western Fan Fest in Visalia, CA with Tommy Smith singing Lead vocals.

=== 40 ===
In 2014, The Lighthouse Boys announced their 40th Anniversary. In May the Lighthouse Boys rejoined the Western States Gospel Music Association (WSGMA). In February 2015, The Lighthouse Boys released their single "From Heaven's Point of View" to digital music stores and to Radio through Patterson Music Promotions.

January 25, 2016, The Lighthouse Boys original drummer Kenny Knight died suddenly at age 52

In April 2016, "The Lighthouse Boys Ultimate Collection" featuring songs from every studio recording, including two new songs.

In May 2016, Stephen Underwood officially stepped down from live performance, Randy Ivie (formerly of Golden State Quartet) filled in in June and joined officially as new Lead Singer in September. In November 2018 just before Thanksgiving, it was announced on SGNScoops.com and The Lighthouse Boys OFficial Facebook Page that Original Founding Member Bill Underwood was taken to the hospital, Bill had dealt with Heart issues since his quadruple bypass in December 2000. In February 2019 Bill received a Heart Transplant at Cedars Sinai Hospital in Los Angeles, Bill would not return to The Lighthouse Boys except for a couple of songs during a handful of local Bakersfield performances, also in December 2018, Original and founding member Steve Johnson was rushed to the hospital where he was diagnosed with Heart Failure, Steve only returned for a couple of performances but would not be able to return full time. Also in December 2018 The Lighthouse Boys announced on SGNscoops.com that Randy Ivie was leaving to restart his own trio again. The Lighthouse Boys and Stephen Underwood had already been in talks earlier in the year for Stephen's return. Mark and Stephen Underwood recruited Lee Hulbert to sing bass and Mike Tweedy to sing Baritone. The Lighthouse Boys would travel mainly California during this time.

=== 2020's ===
In July 2021, Bill Underwood died at Cedars Sinai Hospital in Los Angeles, ten days after being diagnosed with COVID-19 (Delta).

In November 2021, Mark Underwood's son Joe Underwood returned to The Lighthouse Boys to sing baritone and brought his wife Kala Underwood; this would be the first time since 1980 that The Lighthouse Boys would be billed as having five vocals, also the first time since 1983 that The Lighthouse Boys had female vocal in the lineup. In December 2021, it was announced that The Lighthouse Boys former bass player and Stephen Underwood's best friend had died from stage 4 brain cancer. The Lighthouse Boys parted ways with Mike Tweedy and continued on with an even more limited schedule. In May 2022 The Lighthouse Boys released their single "He'll Carry You", a song Mark Underwood wrote; a recording in the archive was found with Bill Underwood's vocal on it, The Lighthouse Boys enlisted the help of their friend Mike Cornell to help with the recording; Joseph Underwood replaced Bill's vocal with his own.

In September 2023, it was announced that Joe and Kala Underwood were stepping away; their own ministry and worship team was getting busier and it was requiring more of their time. The Lighthouse Boys brought back Mike Tweedy to sing baritone and began preparing for 2024, their 50th-anniversary year.

=== 50 ===
January 2024, The Lighthouse Boys announced on their website and social media pages that they were officially kicking off their 50th Anniversary year and a Tour was in the works. In April 2024 The Lighthouse Boys announced their Summer/Fall National 50th Anniversary Tour, they also named Anchor Merchandising as the official company to market The Lighthouse Boys Apparel and other items. On May 4, 2024, at The Great Western Fan Festival at the Visalia Convention Center in Visalia, CA, The Lighthouse Boys were brought up on stage to be honored for their 50th Anniversary. Steve Johnson arrived in the evening and was seen in a wheelchair and was almost completely deaf, however with the help of Mark and Stephen, Steve walked up on stage for the event. Long time friends Larry Martin and Herb Henry presented the plaque.

== Personnel (past and present) ==
The Lighthouse Boys lineups
1974	Mark Underwood – tenor vocals, bass guitar; Steve Johnson – lead vocals; Bill Underwood – baritone vocals, rhythm guitar
1974–1975	Mark Underwood – tenor vocals, bass guitar; Steve Johnson – lead vocals; Bill Underwood – baritone vocals, rhythm guitar; (with supporting members): Helen Underwood Embry - Piano; Sharon Underwood – backup singer; Donna Johnson – backup singer
1976–1978	Mark Underwood – tenor vocals, piano; Steve Johnson – lead vocals; Bill Underwood – baritone vocals, rhythm guitar; Frank McNinch – bass vocals; Gary Miller – Bass Guitar; Kenny Knight – Drums	The Lighthouse Boys (1980)
1979	Mark Underwood – tenor vocals, piano, keyboards; Steve Johnson – lead vocals; Bill Underwood – baritone vocals, rhythm guitar; Tim Cantu – drums, backup vocals; Dathan Fernandez – lead guitar, guitar effects
1979–1980	Mark Underwood – tenor vocals, piano, keyboards; Bill Underwood – baritone vocals, rhythm guitar, bass guitar; Tim Cantu – drums, background vocals; Dathan Fernandez – lead guitar, guitar effects; Ken Edwards – lead vocals, bass guitar, rhythm guitar; Jon Edwards – bass vocals, rhythm guitar	The Lighthouse Boys - Live (2003) recorded May 26, 1980
1981–1983 (limited appearances)	Mark Underwood – tenor vocals, piano, keyboards; Steve Johnson – lead vocals; Bill Underwood – baritone vocals, rhythm guitar
1983 (limited appearances)	Mark Underwood – tenor vocals, piano, keyboards; Bill Underwood – baritone vocals, rhythm guitar, bass guitar; Tim Cantu – drums, background vocals; Ken Edwards – lead vocals, bass guitar, rhythm guitar; Jon Edwards – bass vocals, rhythm guitar
1984–1985 (limited appearances)	Mark Underwood – tenor vocals, piano, keyboards; Steve Johnson – lead vocals; Bill Underwood – baritone vocals, rhythm guitar
1985–1986 (limited appearances)	Mark Underwood – tenor vocals, piano, keyboards; Steve Johnson – lead vocals; Bill Underwood – baritone vocals, rhythm guitar; Tim Cantu - drums, background vocals; Ken Edwards – lead vocals, bass guitar, rhythm guitar
1986–1987	Mark Underwood – tenor vocals, piano; Steve Johnson – bass vocals, lead vocals; Bill Underwood – baritone vocals, rhythm guitar, bass guitar; Tim Cantu – drums, background vocals; Ken Edwards – lead vocals, bass guitar, rhythm guitar; Stephen Underwood - Tambourine, drums
1987–1991	Mark Underwood – tenor vocals, piano, Fender Rhodes; Bill Underwood – baritone vocals, rhythm guitar, bass guitar; Ken Edwards – lead vocals, bass guitar, rhythm guitar; Stephen Underwood – drums
1991–1992	Mark Underwood – tenor vocals, piano, Fender Rhodes; Steve Johnson – bass vocals; Bill Underwood – baritone vocals, rhythm guitar; Stephen Underwood – drums; Terry Mullin – lead vocals, bass guitar
1992–1993	Mark Underwood – tenor vocals, piano; Steve Johnson – bass vocals; Bill Underwood – baritone vocals, rhythm guitar; Ken Edwards – lead vocals, bass guitar; Stephen Underwood – drums	The Lighthouse Boys (1993)
1993–1997	Mark Underwood – tenor vocals, piano, keyboards; Bill Underwood – baritone vocals, rhythm guitar; Ken Edwards – lead vocals, bass guitar; Stephen Underwood – drums; Terry Mullin – bass vocals	Golden Classics (1994)
1997	Mark Underwood – tenor vocals, piano, keyboards; Bill Underwood – baritone vocals, rhythm guitar; Ken Edwards – lead vocals, bass guitar; Stephen Underwood – drums; Terry Mullin – bass vocals; Jeff Johnson - drums, bass guitar, vocals	After I Get to Heaven (2019)
1997	Mark Underwood – tenor vocals; Bill Underwood – baritone vocals, rhythm guitar; Ken Edwards – lead vocals, bass guitar; Stephen Underwood – drums; Terry Mullin – bass vocals; Ted McClaren - piano, keyboards
1998	Mark Underwood – keyboards, vocals; Bill Underwood – baritone vocals, rhythm guitar; Ken Edwards – lead vocals, bass guitar; Stephen Underwood – drums; Terry Mullin – bass vocals; Tim Williams – tenor vocals
1998–1999	Mark Underwood – tenor vocals, piano, keyboards; Steve Johnson – bass vocals; Bill Underwood – baritone vocals, rhythm guitar; Tim Cantu – sound engineer, drums; Stephen Underwood – lead vocals
1999–2000	Mark Underwood – piano, vocals; Bill Underwood – baritone vocals, rhythm guitar; Ken Edwards – lead vocals, bass guitar; Stephen Underwood – drums; Terry Mullin – bass vocals; Tim Williams – tenor vocals	Golden Classics 2 (2000)
2001–2002	Mark Underwood – tenor vocals; Steve Johnson – bass vocals; Bill Underwood – baritone vocals; Stephen Underwood – lead vocals	The Blood Will Never Lose Its Power-The Single (2002)
2002–2003	Mark Underwood – tenor vocals, piano, keyboards; Steve Johnson – bass vocals; Bill Underwood – baritone vocals, rhythm guitar; Stephen Underwood – lead vocals; Joe Underwood – bass guitar; Russ Higgens – drums
2003–2004	Mark Underwood – tenor vocals; Bill Underwood – baritone vocals, rhythm guitar; Stephen Underwood – lead vocals; Joe Underwood – bass guitar; Jeff Edwards – drums; Roger Peirce – bass vocals; Mike Smith – keyboards, vocals
2004	Mark Underwood – tenor vocals, keyboards; Bill Underwood – baritone vocals, rhythm guitar; Stephen Underwood – lead vocals, drums; Joe Underwood – bass guitar; Roger Peirce – bass vocals
2004–2005	Mark Underwood – tenor vocals; Stephen Underwood – lead vocals; Joe Underwood – baritone vocals	The Best of The Lighthouse Boys 1974-2004 (2005)
2006–2007 (limited appearances)	Mark Underwood – tenor vocals; Steve Johnson – bass vocals; Bill Underwood – baritone vocals; Stephen Underwood – lead vocals
2008	Mark Underwood – tenor vocals, keyboards; Steve Johnson – bass vocals; Bill Underwood – baritone vocals, rhythm guitar; Stephen Underwood – lead vocals; Tommy Smith - bass guitar; Chuck Crocker - drums
2009	Mark Underwood – tenor vocals, keyboards; Steve Johnson – bass vocals; Bill Underwood – baritone vocals, rhythm guitar; Stephen Underwood – lead vocals; Tommy Smith - bass guitar; Franky Olds - drums
2009	Mark Underwood – tenor vocals, keyboards; Steve Johnson – bass vocals; Bill Underwood – baritone vocals, rhythm guitar; Tim Cantu - drums; Stephen Underwood – lead vocals; Tommy Smith - bass guitar
2009–2010	Mark Underwood – tenor vocals, keyboards; Steve Johnson - bass vocals; Bill Underwood – baritone vocals, rhythm guitar; Ken Edwards - lead vocals; Stephen Underwood – drums; Tommy Smith - bass guitar	Midnight Cry: The Lighthouse Boys Essential Collection (2010)
2011–2012	Mark Underwood – tenor vocals, keyboards; Steve Johnson – bass vocals; Bill Underwood – baritone vocals, rhythm guitar; Tim Cantu - drums; Stephen Underwood – lead vocals; Tommy Smith - bass guitar
2012	Mark Underwood – tenor vocals, keyboards; Steve Johnson - bass vocals; Bill Underwood – baritone vocals, rhythm guitar; Stephen Underwood – drums; Tommy Smith - lead vocals, bass guitar
2012–2014	Mark Underwood – tenor vocals; Steve Johnson – bass vocals; Bill Underwood – baritone vocals, rhythm guitar; Stephen Underwood – drums, Vocals; Tommy Smith - lead vocals, bass guitar; Jimmy Woods - keyboards
2014	Mark Underwood – tenor vocals; Steve Johnson – bass vocals; Bill Underwood – baritone vocals, rhythm guitar; Stephen Underwood – drums, Vocals; Tommy Smith - bass guitar; Jimmy Woods - keyboards; Duane Meadows - lead vocals	Songs For Easter (Limited Edition digital compilation EP) (2014)
2014–2015	Mark Underwood – tenor vocals; Steve Johnson – bass vocals; Bill Underwood – baritone vocals, rhythm guitar; Stephen Underwood – drums, Vocals; Tommy Smith - bass guitar; Jimmy Woods - keyboards; Carl Barber - lead vocals	From Heaven's Point of View - The Single (2015)
2015	Mark Underwood – tenor vocals; Steve Johnson – bass vocals; Bill Underwood – baritone vocals; Stephen Underwood – lead vocals; Jimmy Woods - keyboards	The Lighthouse Boys Ultimate Collection (2016)
2015–2016	Mark Underwood – tenor vocals; Steve Johnson – bass vocals; Bill Underwood – baritone vocals; Stephen Underwood – lead vocals
2016–2018	Mark Underwood – tenor vocals; Steve Johnson – bass vocals; Bill Underwood – baritone vocals; Randy Ivie – lead vocals
2018–2021	Mark Underwood – tenor vocals; Bill Underwood; Stephen Underwood – lead vocals; Lee Hulbert - bass vocals; Mike Tweedy - baritone vocals
2021–2023	Mark Underwood – tenor vocals; Stephen Underwood – lead vocals; Joe Underwood – baritone vocals; Lee Hulbert - bass vocals; Kala Underwood - vocals	He'll Carry You - The Single (2022)
2023–Present	Mark Underwood – tenor vocals; Stephen Underwood – lead vocals; Lee Hulbert - bass vocals; Mike Tweedy - baritone vocals
2024	Mark Underwood – tenor vocals; Stephen Underwood – lead vocals; Lee Hulbert - bass vocals; Ronnie Pack - baritone vocals	The Sessions (2024)
2025	Mark Underwood – tenor vocals; Stephen Underwood – lead vocals; Ronnie Pack - baritone vocals; Cal Brewer - bass vocals
2026 (Studio Lineup)	Mark Underwood – tenor vocals; Stephen Underwood – lead vocals; Joe Underwood – baritone vocals; Gilbert Ramirez Jr - bass vocals	America Bless God - The Single (2026)

=== Studio musicians ===
A list of Producers, Engineers and Musicians that The Lighthouse Boys have recorded with over the years.

- Jim Shaw – Engineer, Producer, Keyboards
- Doyle Curtsinger – Bass Guitar
- Terry Christoffersen – Guitar, Steel Guitar
- Brian Lonbeck – Guitar
- Mark Yeary – Producer, Keyboards
- David "Max" Reese – Engineer
- Tracy Heaston – Producer, Keyboards
- Mike Pillow – Producer
- Jerry Mulkins – Guitar
- Jimmy Woods – Keyboards
- Nick Forcillo – Engineer
- Rick Reno Stevens - Producer
- Pariecee Mcgriff - Engineer
- Paul Secord - Producer

== Discography ==
=== Albums ===
Year	Album	Members who performed	Record label	Record producer
1980	The Lighthouse Boys	Underwood, Johnson, Underwood, McNinch, Miller, Knight	TLB Records	Jim Shaw, Mark Underwood
1993	The Lighthouse Boys	Underwood, Johnson, Underwood, Edwards, Underwood	TLB Records	Mark Underwood
1994	Golden Classics	Underwood, Underwood, Edwards, Underwood, Mullin	TLB Records	Mark Underwood
2000	Golden Classics 2	Underwood, Underwood, Edwards, Underwood, Mullin, Williams	TLB Records	Tim Williams, Sammy Lee
2003*	The Lighthouse Boys - Live	Underwood, Underwood, Cantu, Fernandez, Edwards, Edwards	TLB Records	The Lighthouse Boys
2005	The Best of The Lighthouse Boys 1974-2004		TLB Records	Stephen Underwood
2010	Midnight Cry, The Essential Collection	Underwood, Underwood, Edwards, Underwood, Mullin, Williams, J Johnson	TLB Records / Ultra Entertainment	Stephen Underwood
2014	Songs For Easter - Limited Edition Compilation EP	Underwood, Underwood, Edwards, Underwood, Mullin, Williams, J Johnson	TLB Records	Stephen Underwood
2016	"The Lighthouse Boys Ultimate Collection"	Underwood, Johnson, Underwood, McNinch, Miller, Knight, Edwards, Underwood, Mullin, Williams, Underwood, Hood, Smith, Woods	TLB Records	Stephen Underwood
2019**	After I Get To Heaven	Underwood, Underwood, Edwards, Underwood, Mullin, J Johnson	TLB Records	Mike Pillow, Mark Underwood
2023	50th Anniversary of "He Does All This For Me" EP	Underwood, Johnson, Underwood, McNinch, Miller, Knight, Biagi	TLB Records	Jim Shaw, Mark Underwood, Stephen Underwood
2024	The Sessions	Underwood, Johnson, Underwood, Underwood, Hulbert, Smith, Wood	TLB Records	Mark Underwood, Stephen Underwood

*originally recorded May 26, 1980
**originally recorded from 1995 to 1997

=== Singles ===
Year	Song	Members who performed	Record label	Producer
1995	Midnight Cry	Underwood, Underwood, Edwards, Underwood, Mullin	TLB Records / Rick Hendrix Company	Mark Underwood, (Engineer) David "Max" Reese
2002	The Blood Will Never Lose Its Power	Underwood, Johnson, Underwood, Underwood	TLB Records	Mark Yeary
2015	From Heaven's Point of View	Underwood, Johnson, Underwood, Underwood, T Smith, Woods	TLB Records, Patterson Music Promotions	Mark Underwood, Stephen Underwood, Nick Forcillo
2022	He'll Carry You	M Underwood, S Underwood, J Underwood, Hulbert, K Underwood	TLB Records	Mark Underwood, Stephen Underwood, Mike Cornell
2026	America Bless God	M Underwood, S Underwood, J Underwood, G Ramirez Jr	TLB Records	Paul Secord

=== Other appearances ===
- 1991 Debra Hoopiiaina - Bought With A Price (Indie)
- 1995 Rick Hendrix Radio Source 1995 Volume 1 (Rick Hendrix Company)
- 1995 WSGMA 20 Great Songs (WSGMA)
- 2002 I.A.M.M Volume 1 (International Association of Music Ministries)
- 2002 Cathy Hollowell - I'll Be There (Oreely Multi-Media)
- 2003 Don Hodge - Song Promo (Indie)
- 2025 Jennifer Keel - Bakersfield Believes (Indie)
