= Mel Profit =

American gridiron football player (born 1941)

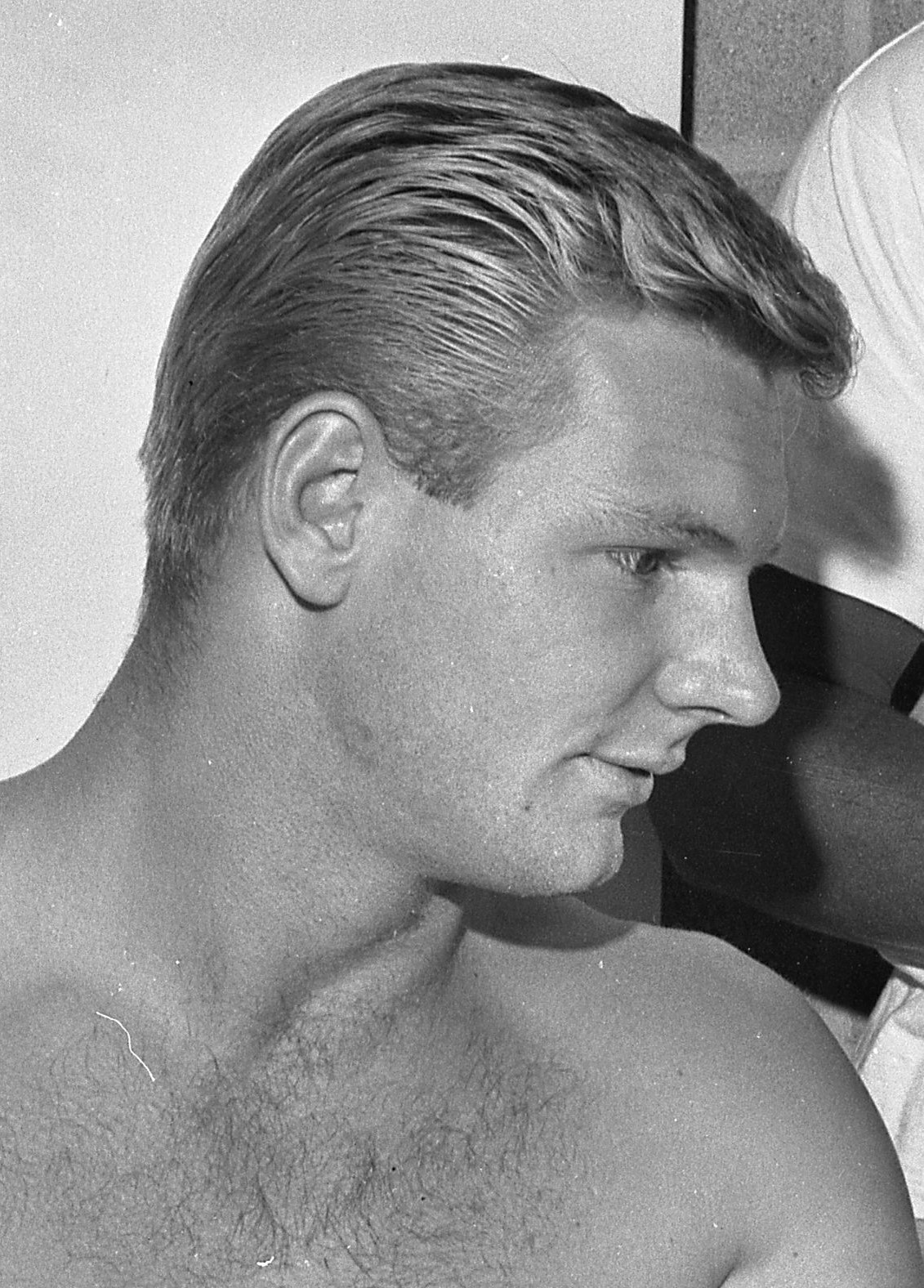
- Profit in 1964

No. 75
- Position: Tight end

Personal information
- Born: July 30, 1941 (age 85); New York City, New York, U.S.
- Listed height: 6 ft 5 in (1.96 m)
- Listed weight: 230 lb (104 kg)

Career information
- College: UCLA
- NFL draft: 1963: 9th round, 113th overall pick

Career history
- 1966–1971: Toronto Argonauts

Awards and highlights
- Jeff Russel Memorial Trophy (1971); CFL All-Star (1971); 4× CFL East All-Star (1968, 1969, 1970, 1971); Second-team All-American (1963); First-team All-PCC (1963)

Mel Profit (born July 30, 1941) is an American former professional Canadian football player who played in the Canadian Football League (CFL) for six years. He was selected in the ninth round originally by the Los Angeles Rams in the 1963 NFL draft. He starred as a tight end for the Toronto Argonauts.

Profit authored a book entitled For Love, Money and Future Considerations which gave a player's view of the CFL. The book chronicled the 1971 season in which the Toronto Argonauts played in the Grey Cup, losing to the Calgary Stampeders.
