= 1963 Drake Bulldogs football team =

American college football season

1963 Drake Bulldogs football
- Conference: Independent
- Record: 4–4
- Head coach: Bus Mertes (4th season)
- Home stadium: Drake Stadium

1963 NCAA College Division independents football records
	Conf.			Overall
Team	W	L	T	W		L		T
East Carolina		–		9	–	1	–	0
Abilene Christian		–		8	–	1	–	0
Northeastern		–		8	–	1	–	0
Wheaton (IL)		–		8	–	1	–	0
Mississippi Vocational		–		6	–	3	–	0
Santa Clara		–		6	–	3	–	0
St. Norbert		–		6	–	3	–	0
Arizona State–Flagstaff		–		5	–	3	–	1
Howard (AL)		–		5	–	3	–	1
Cortland		–		4	–	3	–	0
Lamar Tech		–		5	–	4	–	0
Drake		–		4	–	4	–	0
Hawaii		–		5	–	5	–	0
Northern Michigan		–		4	–	4	–	1
Southern Connecticut State		–		4	–	4	–	0
Wabash		–		4	–	4	–	1
Tampa		–		4	–	5	–	1
Southern Illinois		–		4	–	5	–	0
UC Riverside		–		4	–	5	–	0
UC Santa Barbara		–		4	–	5	–	0
Chattanooga		–		4	–	6	–	0
Lake Forest		–		2	–	4	–	1
Hardin–Simmons		–		2	–	6	–	1
Arkansas State		–		2	–	6	–	0
Eastern Michigan		–		2	–	6	–	0
Rose Poly		–		2	–	6	–	0
Union (NY)		–		2	–	6	–	0
Cal Poly Pomona		–		2	–	7	–	0
Trinity (TX)		–		1	–	6	–	1
Carnegie Tech		–		1	–	6	–	0
Arlington State		–		1	–	8	–	0

The 1963 Drake Bulldogs football team was an American football team that represented Drake University as an independent during the 1963 NCAA College Division football season. In its fourth season under head coach Bus Mertes, Drake compiled a 4–4 record and outscored opponents by a total of 133 to 121. The final game of the season, against Iowa State, was cancelled due to the assassination of John F. Kennedy.

The team's statistical leaders included freshman quarterback Ron Royer (629 passing yards), freshman halfback Cranford "C.T." Traylor (631 rushing yards, 54 points scored), and junior end Steve Valasek (525 receiving yards).

The team played its home games at Drake Stadium in Des Moines, Iowa.

== Schedule ==
Date	Opponent	Site	Result	Attendance	Source
September 21	at Cincinnati	Nippert Stadium; Cincinnati, OH	L 0–28	12,000	
September 28	at Southwest Missouri State	Springfield, MO	L 6–13	5,000	
October 5	South Dakota	Drake Stadium; Des Moines, IA	W 23–20	7,000-8,000	
October 12	State College of Iowa	Drake Stadium; Des Moines, IA	W 21–12	5,000	
October 26	at Bradley	Peoria Stadium; Peoria, IL	W 27–8	6,500	
November 2	Idaho State^{†}	Drake Stadium; Des Moines, IA	W 15–12	8,500	
November 9	at Western Illinois	Hanson Field; Macomb, IL	L 12–14	8,500	
November 16	Omaha	Drake Stadium; Des Moines, IA	L 29–34	6,500	
November 23	Iowa State	Drake Stadium; Des Moines, IA	Cancelled		
^{†}Homecoming
