= List of Northeastern Huskies football seasons =

The following is a list of Northeastern Huskies football seasons.

== Seasons ==
Conference champions^{†}	Conference co-champions^{‡}	Division co-champions^{♦}	Bowl game berth^{^}	Shared standing T

Season	Head coach	Conference	Season results								Postseason result
Season	Head coach	Conference	Final standings		Conference Record			Overall Record			Postseason result
Season	Head coach	Conference	Conference	Division	Wins	Loses	Ties	Wins	Loses	Ties	Postseason result
Northeastern Huskies
1933	Alfred McCoy	Independent						1	3	1	
1934	Alfred McCoy	Independent						6	1	1	
1935	Alfred McCoy	Independent						5	0	3	
1936	Alfred McCoy	Independent						5	4	0	
1937	James W. Dunn	Independent						4	3	0	
1938	James W. Dunn	New England	4th	—	0	0	0	3	3	1	
1939	James W. Dunn	New England	5th	—	0	2	0	0	6	1	
1940	James W. Dunn	New England	5th	—	0	1	0	2	6	0	
1941	James W. Dunn	New England	4th	—	0	1	0	4	3	0	
1942	Foxy Flumere	New England	3rd	—	0	1	0	0	5	1	
1943	Did not play – World War II										
1944	Did not play – World War II										
1945	Did not play – World War II										
1946	William Grinnell	Independent						3	3	0	
1947	William Grinnell	Independent						1	5	0	
1948	Joe Zabilski	Independent						1	4	1	
1949	Joe Zabilski	Independent						3	3	0	
1950	Joe Zabilski	Independent						3	3	1	
1951	Joe Zabilski	Independent						6	0	1	
1952	Joe Zabilski	Independent						4	3	0	
1953	Joe Zabilski	Independent						6	1	0	
1954	Joe Zabilski	Independent						4	3	0	
1955	Joe Zabilski	Independent						4	1	1	
1956	Joe Zabilski	Independent						3	5	0	
1957	Joe Zabilski	Independent						1	6	0	
1958	Joe Zabilski	Independent						6	2	0	
1959	Joe Zabilski	Independent						1	6	1	
1960	Joe Zabilski	Independent						2	5	1	
1961	Joe Zabilski	Independent						4	4	0	
1962	Joe Zabilski	Independent						5	3	0	
1963^	Joe Zabilski	Independent						8	0	1	Lost Eastern Bowl against East Carolina, 6–27
1964	Joe Zabilski	Independent						5	3	0	
1965	Joe Zabilski	Independent						6	2	0	
1966	Joe Zabilski	Independent						6	2	0	
1967	Joe Zabilski	Independent						7	1	0	
1968	Joe Zabilski	Independent						6	3	0	
1969	Joe Zabilski	Independent						3	6	0	
1970	Joe Zabilski	Independent						3	5	0	
1971	Joe Zabilski	Independent						4	5	0	
1972	Robert Lyons	Independent						6	2	0	
1973	Robert Lyons	Independent						3	6	0	
1974	Robert Lyons	Independent						6	4	0	
1975	Robert Lyons	Independent						3	6	0	
1976	Robert Lyons	Independent						2	7	0	
1977	Robert Lyons	Independent						3	6	1	
1978	Robert Lyons	Independent						6	5	0	
1979	Robert Lyons	Independent						3	7	0	
1980	Robert Lyons	Independent						2	9	0	
1981	Paul Pawlak	Independent						3	7	0	
1982	Paul Pawlak	Independent						3	6	0	
1983	Paul Pawlak	Independent						6	4	1	
1984	Paul Pawlak	Independent						3	7	0	
1985	Paul Pawlak	Independent						2	8	0	
1986	Paul Pawlak	Independent						4	6	0	
1987	Paul Pawlak	Independent						6	5	0	
1988	Paul Pawlak	Independent						4	7	0	
1989	Paul Pawlak	Independent						3	7	0	
1990	Paul Pawlak	Independent						1	10	0	
1991	Barry Gallup	Independent						4	7	0	
1992	Barry Gallup	Independent						5	5	1	
1993	Barry Gallup	Yankee	9th	5th (Mid-Atlantic)	2	6	0	2	9	0	
1994	Barry Gallup	Yankee	8th	5th (Mid-Atlantic)	2	6	0	2	9	0	
1995	Barry Gallup	Yankee	9th	5th (Mid-Atlantic)	2	6	0	4	7	0	
1996	Barry Gallup	Yankee	8th	5th (Mid-Atlantic)	3	5	0	6	5	0	
1997	Barry Gallup	Atlantic 10	T–3rd	3rd (Mid-Atlantic)	5	3	0	8	3	0	
1998	Barry Gallup	Atlantic 10	T–7th	5th (Mid-Atlantic)	3	5	0	5	6	0	
1999	Barry Gallup	Atlantic 10	10th	—	1	7	0	2	9	0	
2000	Don Brown	Atlantic 10	10th	—	1	7	0	4	7	0	
2001	Don Brown	Atlantic 10	T–6th	—	4	5	0	5	6	0	
2002†	Don Brown	Atlantic 10	T–1st	—	7	2	0	10	3	0	Lost NCAA First Round against Fordham, 24–29
2003	Don Brown	Atlantic 10	3rd	—	6	3	0	8	4	0	
2004	Rocky Hager	Atlantic 10	5th	—	4	4	0	5	6	0	
2005	Rocky Hager	Atlantic 10	T–8th	5th (North)	2	6	0	2	9	0	
2006	Rocky Hager	Atlantic 10	T–6th	4th (North)	4	4	0	5	6	0	
2007	Rocky Hager	CAA	9th	5th (North)	2	6	0	3	8	0	
2008	Rocky Hager	CAA	10th	6th (North)	1	7	0	2	10	0	
2009	Rocky Hager	CAA	8th	5th (North)	3	5	0	3	8	0	
Total								290	365	17	
