= 1963 Cal Poly Mustangs football team =

American college football season

1963 Cal Poly Mustangs football
- Conference: California Collegiate Athletic Association
- Record: 2–8 (0–4 CCAA)
- Head coach: Sheldon Harden (2nd season)
- Home stadium: Mustang Stadium

1963 California Collegiate Athletic Association football standings
| | Conf. | | | | | Overall |
| Team | W | | L | | T | W | | L | | T |
|---|---|---|---|---|---|---|---|---|---|---|
| Los Angeles State $ | 3 | – | 1 | – | 0 | 7 | – | 1 | – | 0 |
| No. 7 San Diego State | 3 | – | 1 | – | 0 | 7 | – | 2 | – | 0 |
| Long Beach State | 2 | – | 2 | – | 0 | 5 | – | 5 | – | 0 |
| Fresno State | 2 | – | 2 | – | 0 | 4 | – | 6 | – | 0 |
| Cal Poly | 0 | – | 4 | – | 0 | 2 | – | 8 | – | 0 |
| Valley State | 0 | – | 0 | – | 0 | 2 | – | 6 | – | 0 |
$ – Conference champion; Los Angeles State was the conference championship by virtue of its head to head win over San Diego State. Games with Valley State did not count in the conference standings.; Rankings from UPI small college poll

The 1963 Cal Poly Mustangs football team represented California Polytechnic State College—now known as California Polytechnic State University, San Luis Obispo—as a member of the California Collegiate Athletic Association (CCAA) during the 1963 NCAA College Division football season. Led by second-year head coach Sheldon Harden, Cal Poly compiled an overall record of 2–8 with a mark of 0–4 in conference play, placing fifth in the CCAA. The Mustangs played home games at Mustang Stadium in San Luis Obispo, California.

== Schedule ==
| Date | Opponent | Site | Result | Attendance | Source |
|---|---|---|---|---|---|
| September 21 | San Francisco State* | Mustang Stadium; San Luis Obispo, CA | L 22–33 | 4,500 | |
| September 28 | at Valley State* | Monroe High School; Sepulveda, CA | W 19–14 | 2,200–2,300 | |
| October 5 | at No. 7 San Diego State | Aztec Bowl; San Diego, CA | L 0–69 | 10,356–11,300 | |
| October 12 | Cal Western* | Mustang Stadium; San Luis Obispo, CA | L 7–14 | 4,800 | |
| October 19 | Fresno State | Mustang Stadium; San Luis Obispo, CA | L 0–28 | 5,000–5,600 | |
| October 26 | San Diego Marines (Note: The Marine Corps Recruit Depot (MCRD) in San Diego fielded a team that played against colleges and other military teams from 1922 to 1964.)* | Mustang Stadium; San Luis Obispo, CA | L 14–41 | 4,800 | |
| November 2 | Long Beach State | Mustang Stadium; San Luis Obispo, CA | L 6–28 | 5,133 | |
| November 9 | at Los Angeles State | Rose Bowl; Pasadena, CA | L 0–49 | 5,400–9,208 | |
| November 16 | UC Santa Barbara* | Mustang Stadium; San Luis Obispo, CA | W 14–12 | 5,400–5,500 | |
| November 28 | at Humboldt State* | Redwood Bowl; Arcata, CA | L 0–33 | 4,500–4,800 | |
*Non-conference game; Rankings from UPI Coaches Poll released prior to the game
