= 1963 Valley State Matadors football team =

American college football season

1963 Valley State Matadors football
- Conference: California Collegiate Athletic Association
- Record: 2–6 (0–0 CCAA)
- Head coach: Sam Winningham (2nd season)
- Home stadium: Monroe High School

1963 California Collegiate Athletic Association football standings
	Conf.					Overall
Team	W		L		T	W		L		T
Los Angeles State $	3	–	1	–	0	7	–	1	–	0
No. 7 San Diego State	3	–	1	–	0	7	–	2	–	0
Long Beach State	2	–	2	–	0	5	–	5	–	0
Fresno State	2	–	2	–	0	4	–	6	–	0
Cal Poly	0	–	4	–	0	2	–	8	–	0
Valley State	0	–	0	–	0	2	–	6	–	0
$ – Conference champion; Los Angeles State was the conference championship by virtue of its head to head win over San Diego State. Games with Valley State did not count in the conference standings.; Rankings from UPI small college poll

The 1963 Valley State Matadors football team represented San Fernando Valley State College—now known as California State University, Northridge—as a member of the California Collegiate Athletic Association (CCAA) during the 1963 NCAA College Division football season. Led by second-year head coach Sam Winningham, the Matadors compiled an overall record of 2–6. Valley State played three games against conference members, but those contests did not count in the CCAA standings. The team played home games at Monroe High School in Sepulveda, California.

== Schedule ==
Date	Opponent	Site	Result	Attendance	Source
September 21	UC Riverside*	Monroe High School; Sepulveda, CA	W 14–0	2,400	
September 28	Cal Poly*	Monroe High School; Sepulveda, CA	L 14–19	2,200–2,300	
October 13	Occidental*	Monroe High School; Sepulveda, CA	L 13–33	2,600	
October 19	at Redlands*	Redlands Stadium (Note: This stadium is the predecessor to the current Ted Runner Stadium on the University of Redlands campus, which was opened for the 1968 season); Redlands, CA	W 12–6	500	
October 25	at Long Beach State*	Veterans Stadium; Long Beach, CA	L 12–35	2,350	
November 2	at Whittier*	California High School; Whittier, CA	L 12–47	600	
November 9	Cal Poly Pomona*	Monroe High School; Sepulveda, CA	L 8–26	2,500–3,300	
November 16	No. 8 San Diego State*	Monroe High School; Sepulveda, CA	L 6–21	2,800	
*Non-conference game; Rankings from AP Poll released prior to the game
