= Floyd Huggins =

American football player and coach (1928–2011)

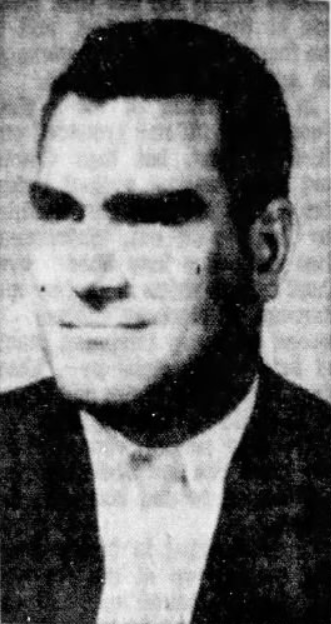
- Huggins in 1962

Biographical details
- Born: April 18, 1928
- Died: March 26, 2011 (aged 82); Olathe, Kansas, U.S.

Playing career
- 1948–1949: Fort Scott
- 1950–1951: Florida
- 1954: Winnipeg Blue Bombers
- Position: Fullback

Coaching career (HC unless noted)
- 1955–1956: Clay HS (FL)
- 1957–1959: McArthur HS (FL)
- 1960–1961: Pratt
- 1962: Hardin–Simmons (backfield)
- 1963: Hardin–Simmons

Administrative career (AD unless noted)
- 1955–1957: Clay HS (FL)

Head coaching record
- Overall: 2–6–1 (college); 12–7 (junior college); 38–13 (high school)

Accomplishments and honors

Championships
- 1 KJCC (1960)

Floyd L. Huggins (April 18, 1928 – March 26, 2011) was an American football player and coach.

Following a career at the University of Florida and service in the Korean War, Huggins spent one season playing for the Winnipeg Blue Bombers of the Canadian Football League (CFL).

From 1955 to 1956, Huggins was the head coach and athletic director for Clay High School. From 1957 to 1959, Huggins served as the head coach for McArthur High School, where he amassed a 23–7 record before being suspended and then resigning after an altercation with an official following a game during the 1959 season.

Huggins served as the head football coach at Pratt Community College in Pratt, Kansas, from 1960 to 1961. In 1960, he led Pratt, which finished the previous season winless, to a share of the Kansas Junior College Conference football title alongside Garden City.

In 1962, Huggins left Pratt and joined Hardin–Simmons as an assistant coach under Jack Thomas. He was promoted to head coach for the 1963 season. Huggins took over after a 1–9 season in 1962 from Thomas, who resigned following NCAA sanctions after it was found that Hardin–Simmons committed recruiting violations. In his lone season, he led the team to a 2–6–1 record in what was the school's last season until 1990, following the dissolution of the program for economic reasons.

After Hardin–Simmons dropped football, Huggins didn't coach again. In 1981, he received his master's degree in educational administration from Kansas State University while serving as the vice president of Fidelity Union Life Insurance Company.

== Head coaching record ==
=== College ===
Year	Team	Overall	Conference	Standing	Bowl/playoffs
Hardin–Simmons Cowboys (NCAA College Division independent) (1963)
1963	Hardin–Simmons	2–6–1			
Hardin–Simmons:		2–6–1			
Total:		2–6–1			

=== Junior college ===
Year	Team	Overall	Conference	Standing	Bowl/playoffs
Pratt Beavers (Kansas Junior College Conference) (1960–1961)
1960	Pratt	8–1	7–1	T–1st	
1961	Pratt	4–6 (Note: Pratt began the season 5–0, but were forced to forfeit all five wins due to an ineligible player.)	2–6	8th	
Pratt:		12–7	9–7		
Total:		12–7			
National championship Conference title Conference division title or championship game berth
