= Bus Mertes =

American football player and coach (1921–2002)

- Mertes in 1947

Biographical details
- Born: October 6, 1921; Chicago, Illinois, U.S.
- Died: January 17, 2002 (aged 80); St. Louis Park, Minnesota, U.S.

Playing career
- 1941: Iowa
- 1942–1944: Iowa Pre-Flight
- 1945: Chicago Cardinals
- 1946: Los Angeles Dons
- 1947–1949: Baltimore Colts
- 1949: New York Giants
- Position: Running back

Coaching career (HC unless noted)
- 1950: Bradley (backfield)
- 1951–1952: Bradley
- 1953–1954: Kansas State (backfield)
- 1955–1959: Kansas State
- 1960–1964: Drake
- 1965–1966: Denver Broncos (assistant)
- 1967–1984: Minnesota Vikings (assistant)

Head coaching record
- Overall: 50–63–1

Bernard James "Bus" Mertes (October 6, 1921 – January 17, 2002) was an American football player and coach. He played college football at the University of Iowa and professionally in the National Football League (NFL) and the All-America Football Conference (AAFC) with the Chicago Cardinals, Los Angeles Dons, Baltimore Colts, and New York Giants. Mertes served as the head football coach at Bradley University from 1951 to 1952, at Kansas State University from 1955 to 1959, and at Drake University from 1960 to 1964, compiling a career college football coaching record of 50–63–1.

== Coaching career ==
=== Kansas State ===
Mertes was the 24th head football coach at Kansas State University in Manhattan, Kansas, and he held that position for five seasons, from 1955 until 1959. His record at Kansas State was 15–34–1.

=== Drake ===
After leaving Kansas State following the 1959 season, Mertes became the 19th head football coach at Drake University in Des Moines, Iowa, serving for five seasons, from 1960 until 1964. His record at Drake was 27–19.

=== Denver Broncos ===
After leaving Drake following the 1964 season, Mertes joined the Denver Broncos of the American Football League as an assistant coach. He coached with Denver for two seasons.

=== Minnesota Vikings ===
After leaving the Denver Broncos, Mertes joined Bud Grant's coaching staff on the Minnesota Vikings of the NFL. He coached the running backs and special teams, working with players such as Bill Brown, Dave Osborn, Ed Marinaro, Chuck Foreman, Ted Brown, Darrin Nelson, Greg Coleman, and Fred Cox. As an assistant with the Vikings from 1967 to 1984, he coached in four Super Bowls.

== Head coaching record ==
Mertes pictured in The Quax 1961, Drake yearbook.

Year	Team	Overall	Conference	Standing
Bradley Braves (Missouri Valley Conference) (1951)
1951	Bradley	4–5	0–3	7th
Bradley Braves (Independent) (1952)
1952	Bradley	4–5		
Bradley:		8–10	0–3	
Kansas State (Big Seven / Big Eight Conference) (1955–1957)
1955	Kansas State	4–6	3–3	T–3rd
1956	Kansas State	3–7	2–4	T–5th
1957	Kansas State	3–6–1	2–4	T–5th
1958	Kansas State	3–7	2–4	5th
1959	Kansas State	2–8	1–5	7th
Kansas State:		15–34–1	10–20	
Drake Bulldogs (NCAA College Division independent) (1960–1964)
1960	Drake	4–5		
1961	Drake	5–4		
1962	Drake	8–2		
1963	Drake	4–4		
1964	Drake	6–4		
Drake:		27–19		
Total:		50–63–1		
