= 1963 Akron Zips football team =

American college football season

1963 Akron Zips football
- Conference: Ohio Athletic Conference
- Record: 6–3 (5–2 OAC)
- Head coach: Gordon K. Larson (3rd season)
- Captain: John Lahoski; Chuck Cobb
- Home stadium: Rubber Bowl

1963 Ohio Athletic Conference football standings
	Conf.					Overall
Team	W		L		T	W		L		T
No. 3 Wittenberg $	6	–	0	–	1	8	–	0	–	1
Denison	5	–	1	–	0	8	–	1	–	0
Oberlin	5	–	1	–	0	6	–	2	–	0
Muskingum	6	–	2	–	0	6	–	3	–	0
Akron	5	–	2	–	0	6	–	3	–	0
Otterbein	4	–	2	–	1	5	–	3	–	1
Baldwin–Wallace	3	–	2	–	0	6	–	3	–	0
Marietta	4	–	3	–	0	5	–	4	–	0
Hiram	2	–	3	–	0	3	–	5	–	0
Kenyon	2	–	4	–	0	2	–	6	–	0
Capital	2	–	6	–	0	2	–	6	–	0
Heidelberg	1	–	5	–	1	1	–	7	–	1
Mount Union	1	–	5	–	0	1	–	8	–	0
Wooster	1	–	6	–	0	1	–	8	–	0
Ohio Wesleyan	0	–	5	–	1	2	–	6	–	1
$ – Conference champion; Rankings from AP small college poll

The 1963 Akron Zips football team represented Akron University in the 1963 NCAA College Division football season as a member of the Ohio Athletic Conference. Led by third-year head coach Gordon K. Larson, the Zips played their home games at the Rubber Bowl in Akron, Ohio. They finished the season with a record of 6–3 overall and 5–2 in OAC play. They outscored their opponents 201–102.

== Schedule ==
Date	Opponent	Site	Result	Attendance	Source
September 21	Muskingum	Rubber Bowl; Akron, OH	W 13–0	42,815	
September 28	at Baldwin–Wallace	Berea, OH	L 10–14	6,500	
October 5	Ohio Wesleyan	Rubber Bowl; Akron, OH	W 36–7	3,865	
October 12	at Heidelberg	Tiffin, OH	W 42–0	3,642	
October 19	at Wooster	Wooster, OH	W 35–14	5,400	
October 26	Capital	Rubber Bowl; Akron, OH	W 19–13	4,414	
November 2	Youngstown State*	Rubber Bowl; Akron, OH (Steel Tire)	W 21–7	3,313	
November 9	at No. 4 Wittenberg	Wittenberg Stadium; Springfield, OH	L 13–34	7,000	
November 16	at Southwest Missouri State*	SMS Stadium; Springfield, MO	L 12–13		
*Non-conference game; Rankings from AP Poll released prior to the game
