= 1963 San Diego State Aztecs football team =

American college football season

1963 San Diego State Aztecs football
- Conference: California Collegiate Athletic Association

Ranking
- Coaches: No. 7 (UPI small college)
- Record: 7–2 (3–1 CCAA)
- Head coach: Don Coryell (3rd season)
- Home stadium: Aztec Bowl

1963 California Collegiate Athletic Association football standings
	Conf.					Overall
Team	W		L		T	W		L		T
Los Angeles State $	3	–	1	–	0	7	–	1	–	0
No. 7 San Diego State	3	–	1	–	0	7	–	2	–	0
Long Beach State	2	–	2	–	0	5	–	5	–	0
Fresno State	2	–	2	–	0	4	–	6	–	0
Cal Poly	0	–	4	–	0	2	–	8	–	0
Valley State	0	–	0	–	0	2	–	6	–	0
$ – Conference champion; Los Angeles State was the conference championship by virtue of its head to head win over San Diego State. Games with Valley State did not count in the conference standings.; Rankings from UPI small college poll

The 1963 San Diego State Aztecs football team represented San Diego State College—now known as San Diego State University as a member of the California Collegiate Athletic Association (CCAA) during the 1963 NCAA College Division football season. Led by third-year head coach Don Coryell, the Aztecs compiled an overall record of 7–2 with a mark of 3–1 in conference play. Los Angeles State, which also had a record of 3–1 in conference play, won the conference championship by virtues of its head-to-head win over San Diego State. For the year, team's offense averaged over 35 points a game, totaling 317 points. The defense gave up an average of 13 points a game, totaling 118 in 9 games. San Diego State played home games at the Aztec Bowl in San Diego.

== Schedule ==
Date	Opponent	Rank	Site	Result	Attendance	Source
September 28	Cal Poly Pomona*		Aztec Bowl; San Diego, CA	W 42–7	13,500	
October 5	Cal Poly	No. 7 UPI	Aztec Bowl; San Diego, CA	W 69–0	10,356	
October 12	Long Beach State	No. 6 UPI	Aztec Bowl; San Diego, CA	W 33–8	13,536	
October 19	at Los Angeles State	No. 5 AP / 5 UPI	Rose Bowl; Pasadena, CA	L 30–43	13,801	
October 26	UC Santa Barbara*^{†}	No. 10 AP / 5 UPI	Aztec Bowl; San Diego, CA	W 42–14	11,265	
November 2	at Fresno State	No. 10 AP / 7 UPI	Ratcliffe Stadium; Fresno, CA (rivalry)	W 34–6	10,871	
November 9	at Pacific (CA)*	No. 8 AP / 6 UPI	Pacific Memorial Stadium; Stockton, CA	W 34–18	4,000–4,500	
November 16	at Valley State*	No. 8 AP / 6 UPI	Monroe High; Sepulveda, CA	W 21–6	2,800	
November 30	at San Diego Marines (Note: The Marine Corps Recruit Depot (MCRD) in San Diego fielded a team that played against colleges and other military teams from 1922 to 1964.)*	No. 9 AP / 6 UPI	Balboa Stadium; San Diego, CA	L 12–16	25,371	
*Non-conference game; ^{†}Homecoming; Rankings from AP/UPI Poll released prior to the game

== Team players in the NFL/AFL ==
The following San Diego State players were selected in the 1964 NFL draft.

Player	Position	Round	Overall	NFL team
John Farris	Guard	11	147	Los Angeles Rams
John Butler	Fullback	20	274	Baltimore Colts

The following San Diego State players were selected in the 1964 AFL Draft.

Player	Position	Round	Overall	NFL team
John Farris	Guard	17	136	San Diego Chargers

The following finished their San Diego State career in 1963, were not drafted, but played in the NFL/AFL.

Player	Position	First NFL Team
Lloyd McCoy	Guard	1964 San Diego Chargers
Mario Mendez	Halfback	1964 San Diego Chargers

== Team awards ==
Award	Player
Most Valuable Player (John Simcox Memorial Trophy)	Mario Mendez
Outstanding Offensive & Defensive Linemen (Byron H. Chase Memorial Trophy)	Frank Acosta; Ed Johns
Most Inspirational Player	Joe Gibbs
