= Jim Asato =

American football and baseball coach (1927–2022)

Biographical details
- Born: July 18, 1927; Makawao, Hawaii Territory, U.S.
- Died: May 11, 2022 (aged 94); Honolulu, Hawaii, U.S.

Playing career

Football
- 1949–1951: Hawaii

Coaching career (HC unless noted)

Football
- 1962–1964: Hawaii

Baseball
- 1962–1964: Hawaii

Head coaching record
- Overall: 15–12 (football)

James Katsuhide Asato (July 18, 1927 – May 11, 2022) was an American football and baseball coach. He served as the head coach at the University of Hawaii from 1962 to 1964. In June 1953, he married Agnes Fujiwara.

Asato died in Honolulu on May 11, 2022, at the age of 94.

== Head coaching record ==
=== Football ===
Year	Team	Overall	Conference	Standing	Bowl/playoffs
Hawaii Rainbows (NCAA College Division independent) (1962–1964)
1962	Hawaii	6–2			
1963	Hawaii	5–5			
1964	Hawaii	4–5			
Hawaii:		15–12			
Total:		15–12			
