= 1963 Long Beach State 49ers football team =

American college football season

1963 Long Beach State 49ers football
- Conference: California Collegiate Athletic Association
- Record: 5–5 (2–2 CCAA)
- Head coach: Don Reed (6th season)
- Home stadium: Veterans Memorial Stadium

1963 California Collegiate Athletic Association football standings
	Conf.					Overall
Team	W		L		T	W		L		T
Los Angeles State $	3	–	1	–	0	7	–	1	–	0
No. 7 San Diego State	3	–	1	–	0	7	–	2	–	0
Long Beach State	2	–	2	–	0	5	–	5	–	0
Fresno State	2	–	2	–	0	4	–	6	–	0
Cal Poly	0	–	4	–	0	2	–	8	–	0
Valley State	0	–	0	–	0	2	–	6	–	0
$ – Conference champion; Los Angeles State was the conference championship by virtue of its head to head win over San Diego State. Games with Valley State did not count in the conference standings.; Rankings from UPI small college poll

The 1963 Long Beach State 49ers football team represented Long Beach State College—now known as California State University, Long Beach—as a member of the California Collegiate Athletic Association (CCAA) during the 1963 NCAA College Division football season. Led by sixth-year head coach Don Reed, the 49ers compiled an overall record of 5–5 with a mark of 2–2 in conference play, tying for third place in the CCAA. The team played home games at Veterans Memorial Stadium adjacent to the campus of Long Beach City College in Long Beach, California.

== Schedule ==
Date	Opponent	Site	Result	Attendance	Source
September 21	San Diego Marines (Note: The Marine Corps Recruit Depot (MCRD) in San Diego fielded a team that played against colleges and other military teams from 1922 to 1964.)*	Veterans Memorial Stadium; Long Beach, CA	L 14–23	3,650	
September 28	at San Francisco State*	Cox Stadium; San Francisco, CA	L 16–20	2,500	
October 5	Sacramento State*	Veterans Memorial Stadium; Long Beach, CA	L 0–4	3,123	
October 12	at No. 6 San Diego State	Aztec Bowl; San Diego, CA	L 8–33	13,536	
October 19	at UC Santa Barbara*	La Playa Stadium; Santa Barbara, CA	W 14–9	4,000	
October 25	Valley State*	Veterans Memorial Stadium; Long Beach, CA	W 35–12	2,350	
November 2	at Cal Poly	Mustang Stadium; San Luis Obispo, CA	W 28–6	2,500	
November 9	Fresno State	Veterans Memorial Stadium; Long Beach, CA	W 25–14	3,762–3,827	
November 16	Los Angeles State	Veterans Memorial Stadium; Long Beach, CA	L 16–20	10,650–10,660	
November 23	Cal Poly Pomona*	Kellogg Field; Pomona, CA	W 40–7	1,000	
*Non-conference game; Rankings from UPI Poll released prior to the game
