= 1963 Ball State Cardinals football team =

American college football season

1963 Ball State Cardinals football
- Conference: Indiana Collegiate Conference
- Record: 5–3 (4–2 ICC)
- Head coach: Ray Louthen (2nd season)
- Home stadium: Ball State Field

1963 Indiana Collegiate Conference football standings
	Conf.					Overall
Team	W		L		T	W		L		T
Butler $	6	–	0	–	0	8	–	1	–	0
Ball State	4	–	2	–	0	5	–	3	–	0
DePauw	3	–	3	–	0	4	–	4	–	0
Valparaiso	3	–	3	–	0	3	–	5	–	0
Indiana State	2	–	4	–	0	4	–	4	–	0
Evansville	2	–	4	–	0	2	–	6	–	0
Saint Joseph's (IN)	1	–	5	–	0	2	–	7	–	0
$ – Conference champion

The 1963 Ball State Cardinals football team was an American football team that represented Ball State College (later renamed Ball State University) in the Indiana Collegiate Conference (ICC) during the 1963 NCAA College Division football season. In its second season under head coach Ray Louthen, the team compiled a 5–3 record (4–2 against ICC opponents) and finished in second place out of seven teams in the ICC.

The team was led on offense by halfback Merv Rettenmund, who later played Major League Baseball for the Baltimore Orioles.

== Schedule ==
Date	Opponent	Site	Result	Attendance	Source
September 21	Eastern Michigan*	Ball State Field; Muncie, IN (Band Day)	W 22–6	10,000	
September 28	at Butler	Butler Bowl; Indianapolis, IN	L 0–13	8,100	
October 5	DePauw	Ball State Field; Muncie, IN	W 15–6	4,100	
October 12	at Saint Joseph's (IN)	Rensselaer, IN	W 23–0	3,000	
October 19	Indiana State^{†}	Ball State Field; Muncie, IN (Blue Key Victory Bell)	W 15–7	11,000	
October 26	at Valparaiso	Brown Field; Valparaiso, IN	L 40–48	5,152	
November 2	Evansville	Ball State Field; Muncie, IN	W 27–7	3,800	
November 9	at Bradley*	Peoria, IL	L 14–28	6,300	'
*Non-conference game; ^{†}Homecoming
