= 1963 Fresno State Bulldogs football team =

American college football season

1963 Fresno State Bulldogs football
- Conference: California Collegiate Athletic Association
- Record: 4–6 (2–2 CCAA)
- Head coach: Cecil Coleman (5th season)
- Home stadium: Ratcliffe Stadium

1963 California Collegiate Athletic Association football standings
	Conf.					Overall
Team	W		L		T	W		L		T
Los Angeles State $	3	–	1	–	0	7	–	1	–	0
No. 7 San Diego State	3	–	1	–	0	7	–	2	–	0
Long Beach State	2	–	2	–	0	5	–	5	–	0
Fresno State	2	–	2	–	0	4	–	6	–	0
Cal Poly	0	–	4	–	0	2	–	8	–	0
Valley State	0	–	0	–	0	2	–	6	–	0
$ – Conference champion; Los Angeles State was the conference championship by virtue of its head to head win over San Diego State. Games with Valley State did not count in the conference standings.; Rankings from UPI small college poll

The 1963 Fresno State Bulldogs football team represented Fresno State College—now known as California State University, Fresno—as a member of the California Collegiate Athletic Association (CCAA) during the 1963 NCAA College Division football season. Led by Cecil Coleman in his fifth and final season as head coach, Fresno State compiled an overall record of 4–6 with a mark of 2–2 in conference play, tying for third place in the CCAA. The Bulldogs played home games at Ratcliffe Stadium on the campus of Fresno City College in Fresno, California.

== Schedule ==
Date	Opponent	Site	Result	Attendance	Source
September 21	at Idaho*	Neale Stadium; Moscow, ID	L 8–32	8,200	
September 28	at Montana State*	Gatton Field; Bozeman, MT	L 7–29	6,500–7,000	
October 5	Adams State*	Ratcliffe Stadium; Fresno, CA	W 25–7	8,449	
October 12	at Pacific (CA)*	Pacific Memorial Stadium; Stockton, CA	W 29–7	11,000–14,000	
October 19	at Cal Poly	Mustang Stadium; San Luis Obispo, CA	W 28–0	5,000–5,600	
October 26	Los Angeles State	Ratcliffe Stadium; Fresno, CA	W 35–20	11,353	
November 2	No. 10 San Diego State	Ratcliffe Stadium; Fresno, CA (rivalry)	L 6–34	10,871	
November 9	at Long Beach State	Veterans Stadium; Long Beach, CA	L 14–25	3,762	
November 16	San Jose State*	Ratcliffe Stadium; Fresno, CA (rivalry)	L 27–56	8,000–8,684	
November 23	Abilene Christian*	Ratcliffe Stadium; Fresno, CA	L 29–32	5,562	
*Non-conference game; Rankings from AP Poll released prior to the game

== Team players in the NFL/AFL ==
The following were selected in the 1964 NFL draft.

Player	Position	Round	Overall	NFL team
Jim Long	Back	12	155	San Francisco 49ers

The following were selected in the 1964 American Football League draft.

Player	Position	Round	Overall	AFL team
Jim Long	Fullback	22	175	Oakland Raiders
