= 1963 Cal Poly Pomona Broncos football team =

American college football season

1963 Cal Poly Pomona Broncos football
- Conference: Independent
- Record: 2–7
- Head coach: Don Warhurst (7th season)
- Home stadium: Kellogg Field

1963 NCAA College Division independents football records
| | Conf. | | | Overall |
| Team | W | L | T | W | | L | | T |
|---|---|---|---|---|---|---|---|---|
| East Carolina | | – | | 9 | – | 1 | – | 0 |
| Abilene Christian | | – | | 8 | – | 1 | – | 0 |
| Northeastern | | – | | 8 | – | 1 | – | 0 |
| Wheaton (IL) | | – | | 8 | – | 1 | – | 0 |
| Mississippi Vocational | | – | | 6 | – | 3 | – | 0 |
| Santa Clara | | – | | 6 | – | 3 | – | 0 |
| St. Norbert | | – | | 6 | – | 3 | – | 0 |
| Arizona State–Flagstaff | | – | | 5 | – | 3 | – | 1 |
| Howard (AL) | | – | | 5 | – | 3 | – | 1 |
| Cortland | | – | | 4 | – | 3 | – | 0 |
| Lamar Tech | | – | | 5 | – | 4 | – | 0 |
| Parsons | | – | | 5 | – | 4 | – | 0 |
| Drake | | – | | 4 | – | 4 | – | 0 |
| Hawaii | | – | | 5 | – | 5 | – | 0 |
| Northern Michigan | | – | | 4 | – | 4 | – | 1 |
| Southern Connecticut State | | – | | 4 | – | 4 | – | 0 |
| Wabash | | – | | 4 | – | 4 | – | 1 |
| Tampa | | – | | 4 | – | 5 | – | 1 |
| Southern Illinois | | – | | 4 | – | 5 | – | 0 |
| UC Riverside | | – | | 4 | – | 5 | – | 0 |
| UC Santa Barbara | | – | | 4 | – | 5 | – | 0 |
| Chattanooga | | – | | 4 | – | 6 | – | 0 |
| Lake Forest | | – | | 2 | – | 4 | – | 1 |
| Hardin–Simmons | | – | | 2 | – | 6 | – | 1 |
| Arkansas State | | – | | 2 | – | 6 | – | 0 |
| Eastern Michigan | | – | | 2 | – | 6 | – | 0 |
| Rose Poly | | – | | 2 | – | 6 | – | 0 |
| Union (NY) | | – | | 2 | – | 6 | – | 0 |
| Cal Poly Pomona | | – | | 2 | – | 7 | – | 0 |
| Trinity (TX) | | – | | 1 | – | 6 | – | 1 |
| Carnegie Tech | | – | | 1 | – | 6 | – | 0 |
| Arlington State | | – | | 1 | – | 8 | – | 0 |

The 1963 Cal Poly Pomona Broncos football team represented the Cal Poly Kellogg-Voorhis Unit—now known as California State Polytechnic University, Pomona—as an independent during the 1963 NCAA College Division football season. Led by seventh-year head coach Don Warhurst, Cal Poly Pomona compiled a record of 2–7. The team was outscored by its opponents 263 to 120 for the season. The Broncos played home games at Kellogg Field in Pomona, California.

== Schedule ==
| Date | Opponent | Site | Result | Attendance | Source |
|---|---|---|---|---|---|
| September 21 | Sacramento State | Kellogg Field; Pomona, CA | L 34–36 | 2,500 | |
| September 28 | at San Diego State | Aztec Bowl; San Diego, CA | L 7–42 | 13,500 | |
| October 5 | San Francisco State | Kellogg Field; Pomona, CA | L 6–21 | 2,500 | |
| October 12 | at Cal State Los Angeles | Rose Bowl; Pasadena, CA | L 6–24 | 9,527–9,600 | |
| October 19 | San Diego Marines (Note: The Marine Corps Recruit Depot (MCRD) in San Diego fielded a team that played against colleges and other military teams from 1922 to 1964.) | Kellogg Field; Pomona, CA | L 6–37 | 2,000 | |
| October 26 | at Cal Western | Balboa Stadium?; San Diego, CA | W 14–13 | 2,300 | |
| November 2 | at Arizona State–Flagstaff | Lumberjack Stadium; Flagstaff, AZ | L 14–42 | 2,800–4,000 | |
| November 9 | at Valley State | Monroe High School; Sepulveda, CA | W 26–8 | 2,500–3,300 | |
| November 23 | Long Beach State | Kellogg Field; Pomona, CA | L 7–40 | 1,000 | |
