= 1963 Wittenberg Tigers football team =

American college football season

1963 Wittenberg Tigers football

OAC champion
- Conference: Ohio Athletic Conference
- Record: 8–0–1 (6–0–1 OAC)
- Head coach: Bill Edwards (9th season)

1963 Ohio Athletic Conference football standings
	Conf.					Overall
Team	W		L		T	W		L		T
No. 3 Wittenberg $	6	–	0	–	1	8	–	0	–	1
Denison	5	–	1	–	0	8	–	1	–	0
Oberlin	5	–	1	–	0	6	–	2	–	0
Muskingum	6	–	2	–	0	6	–	3	–	0
Akron	5	–	2	–	0	6	–	3	–	0
Otterbein	4	–	2	–	1	5	–	3	–	1
Baldwin–Wallace	3	–	2	–	0	6	–	3	–	0
Marietta	4	–	3	–	0	5	–	4	–	0
Hiram	2	–	3	–	0	3	–	5	–	0
Kenyon	2	–	4	–	0	2	–	6	–	0
Capital	2	–	6	–	0	2	–	6	–	0
Heidelberg	1	–	5	–	1	1	–	7	–	1
Mount Union	1	–	5	–	0	1	–	8	–	0
Wooster	1	–	6	–	0	1	–	8	–	0
Ohio Wesleyan	0	–	5	–	1	2	–	6	–	1
$ – Conference champion; Rankings from AP small college poll

The 1963 Wittenberg Tigers football team was an American football team that represented Wittenberg University in the Ohio Athletic Conference (OAC) during the 1963 NCAA College Division football season. In their ninth year under head coach Bill Edwards, the Tigers compiled an 8–0–1 record and won the OAC championship. They were ranked No. 3 in the final Associated Press small college poll with 38 points – trailing Northern Illinois (63 points) and Delaware (53 points). Wittenberg had three consecutive undefeated seasons from 1962 to 1964.

Five Wittenberg players were selected by the Associated Press as first-team players on the 1963 All-OAC football team: quarterback Charlie Green; halfback Larry Skeldon; end Bob Cherry; defensive end Jim Worden; and linebacker Dan Mussulin.

== Schedule ==
Date	Opponent	Rank	Site	Result	Attendance	Source
September 21	vs. Baldwin–Wallace		Cleveland, OH	W 21–7	5,375	
September 28	Otterbein		Springfield, OH	T 28–28	7,500	
October 5	at Heidelberg		Tiffin, OH	W 48–0	2,400	
October 12	at Capital		Columbus, OH	W 51–14	5,000	
October 19	Marietta		Springfield, OH	W 57–5	7,500	
October 26	at Ohio Wesleyan	No. 4	Delaware, OH	W 50–14	5,000–6,500	
November 2	at Lenoir Rhyne*	No. 4	6,500; Hickory, NC	W 28–27	6,500	
November 9	Akron	No. 4	Springfield, OH	W 34–13	7,000	
November 16	Gettysburg*	No. 3	Springfield, OH	W 48–36	6,000	
*Non-conference game; Rankings from AP Poll released prior to the game
