= Joe Zabilski =

American football and basketball and college athletics administrator

- Zabilski pictured in The Cauldron 1954, Northeastern yearbook

Biographical details
- Born: July 4, 1917; Providence, Rhode Island, U.S.
- Died: April 27, 2002 (aged 84); Boston, Massachusetts, U.S.

Playing career

Football
- 1938–1940: Boston College
- 1942: North Carolina Pre-Flight
- Position: Guard

Coaching career (HC unless noted)

Football
- 1946–1947: Maine (line)
- 1948–1971: Northeastern

Basketball
- ?–1948: Maine (freshmen)
- 1948–1958: Northeastern

Track and field
- ?–1948: Maine (freshmen)

Administrative career (AD unless noted)
- 1976–1983: Northeastern

Head coaching record
- Overall: 101–77–6 (football); 82–109 (basketball)

Joseph P. Zabilski (July 4, 1917 – April 27, 2002) was an American football and basketball and college athletics administrator. He served as the head football coach at Northeastern University from 1948 to 1971, compiling a record of 101–77–6. Zabilski was also the head basketball coach at Northeastern from 1948 to 1958, tallying a mark of 82–109.

Zabilski played college football at Boston College from 1938 to 1940. During World War II, he served as an officer in the United States Navy. While in the service, he played on the North Carolina Pre-Flight Cloudbusters football team in 1942 coached by Jim Crowley. In 1946, Zabilski was named line coach at the University of Maine under head coach George E. Allen. At Maine, he also coached the freshmen basketball and track and field teams.

== Head coaching record ==
=== Football ===
Year	Team	Overall	Conference	Standing	Bowl/playoffs
Northeastern Huskies (Independent) (1948–1971)
1948	Northeastern	1–4–1			
1949	Northeastern	3–3			
1950	Northeastern	3–3–1			
1951	Northeastern	6–0–1			
1952	Northeastern	4–3			
1953	Northeastern	6–1			
1954	Northeastern	4–3			
1955	Northeastern	4–1–1			
1956	Northeastern	3–5			
1957	Northeastern	1–6			
1958	Northeastern	6–2			
1959	Northeastern	1–6–1			
1960	Northeastern	2–5–1			
1961	Northeastern	4–4			
1962	Northeastern	5–3			
1963	Northeastern	8–1			L Eastern Bowl
1964	Northeastern	5–3			
1965	Northeastern	6–2			
1966	Northeastern	6–2			
1967	Northeastern	7–1			
1968	Northeastern	6–3			
1969	Northeastern	3–6			
1970	Northeastern	3–5			
1971	Northeastern	4–5			
Northeastern:		101–77–6			
Total:		101–77–6			
