= 1963 Los Angeles State Diablos football team =

American college football season

1963 Los Angeles State Diablos football

CCAA champion
- Conference: California Collegiate Athletic Association
- Record: 7–1 (3–1 CCAA)
- Head coach: Homer Beatty (1st season)
- Home stadium: Rose Bowl

1963 California Collegiate Athletic Association football standings
	Conf.					Overall
Team	W		L		T	W		L		T
Los Angeles State $	3	–	1	–	0	7	–	1	–	0
No. 7 San Diego State	3	–	1	–	0	7	–	2	–	0
Long Beach State	2	–	2	–	0	5	–	5	–	0
Fresno State	2	–	2	–	0	4	–	6	–	0
Cal Poly	0	–	4	–	0	2	–	8	–	0
Valley State	0	–	0	–	0	2	–	6	–	0
$ – Conference champion; Los Angeles State was the conference championship by virtue of its head to head win over San Diego State. Games with Valley State did not count in the conference standings.; Rankings from UPI small college poll

The 1963 Los Angeles State Diablos football team represented Los Angeles State College—now known as California State University, Los Angeles—as a member of the California Collegiate Athletic Association (CCAA) during the 1963 NCAA College Division football season. Led by first-year head coach Homer Beatty, the Diablos compiled an overall record of 7–1 with a mark of 3–1 in conference play. Los Angeles State won the CCAA championship by virtue of its head-to-head win over San Diego State, which also had a record of 3–1 in conference play. The Diablos played home games at the Rose Bowl in Pasadena, California.

== Schedule ==
Date	Opponent	Site	Result	Attendance	Source
September 21	University of Mexico*	Rose Bowl; Pasadena, CA	W 45–7	2,613	
September 27	at Occidental*	D. W. Patterson Field; Los Angeles, CA	W 21–0	3,800	
October 12	Cal Poly Pomona*	Rose Bowl; Pasadena, CA	W 24–6	9,527–9,600	
October 19	No. 5 San Diego State	Rose Bowl; Pasadena, CA	W 43–30	13,801	
October 26	at Fresno State	Ratcliffe Stadium; Fresno, CA	L 20–35	11,353	
November 2	at Hawaii*	Honolulu Stadium; Honolulu, HI	W 43–7	7,576	
November 9	Cal Poly^{†}	Rose Bowl; Pasadena, CA	W 49–0	5,400–9,208	
November 16	at Long Beach State	Veterans Stadium; Long Beach, CA	W 20–16	10,650–10,660	
*Non-conference game; ^{†}Homecoming; Rankings from AP Poll released prior to the game

== Team players in the NFL/AFL ==
The following Los Angeles State players were selected in the 1964 NFL draft.

Player	Position	Round	Overall	NFL team
Howard Kindig	Defensive end, tackle	13	170	Philadelphia Eagles

The following Los Angeles State players were selected in the 1964 AFL Draft.

Player	Position	Round	Overall	NFL team
Howard Kindig	Defensive end, tackle	14	112	San Diego Chargers
