= 1963 UC Riverside Highlanders football team =

American college football season

1963 UC Riverside Highlanders football
- Conference: Independent
- Record: 1–7–1
- Head coach: Jim Whitley (5th season)
- Home stadium: UCR Athletic Field

1963 NCAA College Division independents football records
	Conf.			Overall
Team	W	L	T	W		L		T
East Carolina		–		9	–	1	–	0
Abilene Christian		–		8	–	1	–	0
Northeastern		–		8	–	1	–	0
Wheaton (IL)		–		8	–	1	–	0
Mississippi Vocational		–		6	–	3	–	0
Santa Clara		–		6	–	3	–	0
St. Norbert		–		6	–	3	–	0
Arizona State–Flagstaff		–		5	–	3	–	1
Howard (AL)		–		5	–	3	–	1
Cortland		–		4	–	3	–	0
Lamar Tech		–		5	–	4	–	0
Parsons		–		5	–	4	–	0
Drake		–		4	–	4	–	0
Hawaii		–		5	–	5	–	0
Northern Michigan		–		4	–	4	–	1
Southern Connecticut State		–		4	–	4	–	0
Wabash		–		4	–	4	–	1
Tampa		–		4	–	5	–	1
Southern Illinois		–		4	–	5	–	0
UC Riverside		–		4	–	5	–	0
UC Santa Barbara		–		4	–	5	–	0
Chattanooga		–		4	–	6	–	0
Lake Forest		–		2	–	4	–	1
Hardin–Simmons		–		2	–	6	–	1
Arkansas State		–		2	–	6	–	0
Eastern Michigan		–		2	–	6	–	0
Rose Poly		–		2	–	6	–	0
Union (NY)		–		2	–	6	–	0
Cal Poly Pomona		–		2	–	7	–	0
Trinity (TX)		–		1	–	6	–	1
Carnegie Tech		–		1	–	6	–	0
Arlington State		–		1	–	8	–	0

The 1963 UC Riverside Highlanders football team represented the University of California, Riverside as an independent during the 1963 NCAA College Division football season. Led by Jim Whitley in his fifth and final season as head coach, UC Riverside compiled a record of 1–7–1. The team was outscored by its opponents 224 to 48 for the season and was shut out in six of its nine games. The Highlanders played home games at UCR Athletic Field in Riverside, California.

Whitley finished his tenure at UC Riverside with an overall record of 17–21–2, for a .450 winning percentage.

== Schedule ==
Date	Opponent	Site	Result	Attendance	Source
September 21	at Valley State	Monroe High School; Sepulveda, CA	L 0–14	2,400	
September 28	Cal Lutheran	UCR Athletic Field; Riverside, CA	W 22–15		
October 5	at UC Santa Barbara	La Playa Stadium; Santa Barbara, CA	L 0–42	3,000	
October 11	at Caltech	Rose Bowl; Pasadena, CA	L 0–14		
October 19	Santa Clara	UCR Athletic Field; Riverside, CA	L 0–39	3,000	
October 26	at Claremont-Mudd	Fritz B. Burns Stadium; Claremont, CA	L 0–39		
November 2	Pomona	UCR Athletic Field; Riverside, CA	T 14–14		
November 9	at La Verne	Bonita High School?; La Verne, CA	L 12–15		
November 16	Redlands	UCR Athletic Field; Riverside, CA	L 0–32		
