= 1963 Hawaii Rainbows football team =

American college football season

1963 Hawaii Rainbows football
- Conference: Independent
- Record: 5–5
- Head coach: Jim Asato (2nd season)
- Home stadium: Honolulu Stadium

1963 NCAA College Division independents football records
	Conf.			Overall
Team	W	L	T	W		L		T
East Carolina		–		9	–	1	–	0
Abilene Christian		–		8	–	1	–	0
Northeastern		–		8	–	1	–	0
Wheaton (IL)		–		8	–	1	–	0
Mississippi Vocational		–		6	–	3	–	0
Santa Clara		–		6	–	3	–	0
St. Norbert		–		6	–	3	–	0
Arizona State–Flagstaff		–		5	–	3	–	1
Howard (AL)		–		5	–	3	–	1
Cortland		–		4	–	3	–	0
Lamar Tech		–		5	–	4	–	0
Parsons		–		5	–	4	–	0
Drake		–		4	–	4	–	0
Hawaii		–		5	–	5	–	0
Northern Michigan		–		4	–	4	–	1
Southern Connecticut State		–		4	–	4	–	0
Wabash		–		4	–	4	–	1
Tampa		–		4	–	5	–	1
Southern Illinois		–		4	–	5	–	0
UC Riverside		–		4	–	5	–	0
UC Santa Barbara		–		4	–	5	–	0
Chattanooga		–		4	–	6	–	0
Lake Forest		–		2	–	4	–	1
Hardin–Simmons		–		2	–	6	–	1
Arkansas State		–		2	–	6	–	0
Eastern Michigan		–		2	–	6	–	0
Rose Poly		–		2	–	6	–	0
Union (NY)		–		2	–	6	–	0
Cal Poly Pomona		–		2	–	7	–	0
Trinity (TX)		–		1	–	6	–	1
Carnegie Tech		–		1	–	6	–	0
Arlington State		–		1	–	8	–	0

The 1963 Hawaii Rainbows football team represented the University of Hawaiʻi at Mānoa as an independent during the 1963 NCAA College Division football season. In their second season under head coach Jim Asato, the Rainbows compiled a 5–5 record.

== Schedule ==
Date	Opponent	Site	Result	Attendance
September 19	AAH All-State	Honolulu Stadium; Honolulu, HI	W 25–12	2,000
September 28	at Humboldt State	Redwood Bowl; Arcata, CA	L 13–30	5,500
October 5	at Redlands	Redlands, CA	W 7–6	
October 17	AAH All-Stars	Honolulu Stadium; Honolulu, HI	W 26–14	1,415
October 17	Hawaii Colts	Honolulu Stadium; Honolulu, HI	W 21–14	8,000
November 2	Los Angeles State	Honolulu Stadium; Honolulu, HI	L 7–43	7,576
November 13	Hawaii Colts	Honolulu Stadium; Honolulu, HI	W 28–0	2,468
November 26	Cal Western^{†}	Honolulu Stadium; Honolulu, HI	L 13–16	4,303
November 30	Service Stars	Honolulu Stadium; Honolulu, HI	L 20–26	3,171
December 6	Pacific (CA)	Honolulu Stadium; Honolulu, HI	L 0–6	8,560
^{†}Homecoming
