= 1963 Arizona State–Flagstaff Lumberjacks football team =

American college football season

1963 Arizona State–Flagstaff Lumberjacks football
- Conference: Independent
- Record: 5–3–1
- Head coach: Max Spilsbury (8th season)
- Home stadium: Lumberjack Stadium

1963 NCAA College Division independents football records
	Conf.			Overall
Team	W	L	T	W		L		T
East Carolina		–		9	–	1	–	0
Abilene Christian		–		8	–	1	–	0
Northeastern		–		8	–	1	–	0
Wheaton (IL)		–		8	–	1	–	0
Mississippi Vocational		–		6	–	3	–	0
Santa Clara		–		6	–	3	–	0
St. Norbert		–		6	–	3	–	0
Arizona State–Flagstaff		–		5	–	3	–	1
Howard (AL)		–		5	–	3	–	1
Cortland		–		4	–	3	–	0
Lamar Tech		–		5	–	4	–	0
Parsons		–		5	–	4	–	0
Drake		–		4	–	4	–	0
Hawaii		–		5	–	5	–	0
Northern Michigan		–		4	–	4	–	1
Southern Connecticut State		–		4	–	4	–	0
Wabash		–		4	–	4	–	1
Tampa		–		4	–	5	–	1
Southern Illinois		–		4	–	5	–	0
UC Riverside		–		4	–	5	–	0
UC Santa Barbara		–		4	–	5	–	0
Chattanooga		–		4	–	6	–	0
Lake Forest		–		2	–	4	–	1
Hardin–Simmons		–		2	–	6	–	1
Arkansas State		–		2	–	6	–	0
Eastern Michigan		–		2	–	6	–	0
Rose Poly		–		2	–	6	–	0
Union (NY)		–		2	–	6	–	0
Cal Poly Pomona		–		2	–	7	–	0
Trinity (TX)		–		1	–	6	–	1
Carnegie Tech		–		1	–	6	–	0
Arlington State		–		1	–	8	–	0

The 1963 Arizona State–Flagstaff Lumberjacks football team was an American football team that represented Arizona State College at Flagstaff (now known as Northern Arizona University) as an independent during the 1963 NCAA College Division football season. In their eighth year under head coach Max Spilsbury, the Lumberjacks compiled a 5–3–1 record and outscored opponents by a total of 194 to 128.

The team played its home games at Lumberjack Stadium in Flagstaff, Arizona.

== Schedule ==
Date	Opponent	Site	Result	Attendance	Source
September 21	Whittier	Lumberjack Stadium; Flagstaff, AZ	T 6–6	4,200–5,000	
September 28	San Diego Marines	Lumberjack Stadium; Flagstaff, AZ	L 7–40	4,200	
October 5	Idaho State^{†}	Lumberjack Stadium; Flagstaff, AZ	L 2–13	5,200–5,500	
October 12	at New Mexico Highlands	Las Vegas, NV	W 49–0	1,500	
October 19	at Montana State	Gatton Field; Bozeman, MT	L 7–28	7,500	
October 26	New Mexico Western	Lumberjack Stadium; Flagstaff, AZ	W 52–14	4,600	
November 2	Cal Poly Pomona	Lumberjack Stadium; Flagstaff, AZ	W 41–14	2,800–4,000	
November 9	at Western State (CO)	Gunnison, CO	W 14–7	3,500	
November 16	vs. Eastern New Mexico	Globe, AZ	W 15–6	3,100	
^{†}Homecoming
