= 1963 UC Santa Barbara Gauchos football team =

American college football season

1963 UC Santa Barbara Gauchos football
- Conference: Independent
- Record: 4–5
- Head coach: Jack Curtice (1st season)
- Home stadium: La Playa Stadium

1963 NCAA College Division independents football records
| | Conf. | | | Overall |
| Team | W | L | T | W | | L | | T |
|---|---|---|---|---|---|---|---|---|
| East Carolina | | – | | 9 | – | 1 | – | 0 |
| Abilene Christian | | – | | 8 | – | 1 | – | 0 |
| Northeastern | | – | | 8 | – | 1 | – | 0 |
| Wheaton (IL) | | – | | 8 | – | 1 | – | 0 |
| Mississippi Vocational | | – | | 6 | – | 3 | – | 0 |
| Santa Clara | | – | | 6 | – | 3 | – | 0 |
| St. Norbert | | – | | 6 | – | 3 | – | 0 |
| Arizona State–Flagstaff | | – | | 5 | – | 3 | – | 1 |
| Howard (AL) | | – | | 5 | – | 3 | – | 1 |
| Cortland | | – | | 4 | – | 3 | – | 0 |
| Lamar Tech | | – | | 5 | – | 4 | – | 0 |
| Parsons | | – | | 5 | – | 4 | – | 0 |
| Drake | | – | | 4 | – | 4 | – | 0 |
| Hawaii | | – | | 5 | – | 5 | – | 0 |
| Northern Michigan | | – | | 4 | – | 4 | – | 1 |
| Southern Connecticut State | | – | | 4 | – | 4 | – | 0 |
| Wabash | | – | | 4 | – | 4 | – | 1 |
| Tampa | | – | | 4 | – | 5 | – | 1 |
| Southern Illinois | | – | | 4 | – | 5 | – | 0 |
| UC Riverside | | – | | 4 | – | 5 | – | 0 |
| UC Santa Barbara | | – | | 4 | – | 5 | – | 0 |
| Chattanooga | | – | | 4 | – | 6 | – | 0 |
| Lake Forest | | – | | 2 | – | 4 | – | 1 |
| Hardin–Simmons | | – | | 2 | – | 6 | – | 1 |
| Arkansas State | | – | | 2 | – | 6 | – | 0 |
| Eastern Michigan | | – | | 2 | – | 6 | – | 0 |
| Rose Poly | | – | | 2 | – | 6 | – | 0 |
| Union (NY) | | – | | 2 | – | 6 | – | 0 |
| Cal Poly Pomona | | – | | 2 | – | 7 | – | 0 |
| Trinity (TX) | | – | | 1 | – | 6 | – | 1 |
| Carnegie Tech | | – | | 1 | – | 6 | – | 0 |
| Arlington State | | – | | 1 | – | 8 | – | 0 |

The 1963 UC Santa Barbara Gauchos football team represented the University of California, Santa Barbara (UCSB) as an independent during the 1963 NCAA College Division football season. Led by first-year head coach Jack Curtice, the Gauchos compiled a record of 4–5. The team played home games at La Playa Stadium in Santa Barbara, California.

== Schedule ==
| Date | Opponent | Site | Result | Attendance | Source |
|---|---|---|---|---|---|
| September 14 | Instituto Politécnico Nacional Águilas Blancas | La Playa Stadium; Santa Barbara, CA | W 28–14 | 7,500 | |
| September 28 | Whittier | La Playa Stadium; Santa Barbara, CA | W 9–7 | 4,300 | |
| October 5 | UC Riverside | La Playa Stadium; Santa Barbara, CA | W 42–0 | 3,000 | |
| October 12 | at Sacramento State | Charles C. Hughes Stadium; Sacramento, CA | L 0–19 | 2,500 | |
| October 19 | Long Beach State | La Playa Stadium; Santa Barbara, CA | L 9–14 | 4,000 | |
| October 26 | at San Diego State | Aztec Bowl; San Diego, CA | L 14–42 | 11,265 | |
| November 2 | vs. UC Davis (Note: The game against UC Davis was part of an "All-UC Doubleheader" that was held annually from 1948 to 1963. The other game of the double-header was California vs. UCLA. The games were always held at the home stadium of either Cal or UCLA.) | Los Angeles Memorial Coliseum; Los Angeles, CA | L 0–7 | 2,321 | |
| November 9 | Santa Clara | La Playa Stadium; Santa Barbara, CA | W 27–14 | 7,200 | |
| November 16 | at Cal Poly | Mustang Stadium; San Luis Obispo, CA | L 12–14 | 5,400–5,500 | |
