= 1963 Tampa Spartans football team =

American college football season

1963 Tampa Spartans football
- Conference: Independent
- Record: 4–5–1
- Head coach: Fred Pancoast (2nd season)
- Home stadium: Phillips Field

1963 NCAA College Division independents football records
	Conf.			Overall
Team	W	L	T	W		L		T
East Carolina		–		9	–	1	–	0
Abilene Christian		–		8	–	1	–	0
Northeastern		–		8	–	1	–	0
Wheaton (IL)		–		8	–	1	–	0
Mississippi Vocational		–		6	–	3	–	0
Santa Clara		–		6	–	3	–	0
St. Norbert		–		6	–	3	–	0
Arizona State–Flagstaff		–		5	–	3	–	1
Howard (AL)		–		5	–	3	–	1
Cortland		–		4	–	3	–	0
Lamar Tech		–		5	–	4	–	0
Parsons		–		5	–	4	–	0
Drake		–		4	–	4	–	0
Hawaii		–		5	–	5	–	0
Northern Michigan		–		4	–	4	–	1
Southern Connecticut State		–		4	–	4	–	0
Wabash		–		4	–	4	–	1
Tampa		–		4	–	5	–	1
Southern Illinois		–		4	–	5	–	0
UC Riverside		–		4	–	5	–	0
UC Santa Barbara		–		4	–	5	–	0
Chattanooga		–		4	–	6	–	0
Lake Forest		–		2	–	4	–	1
Hardin–Simmons		–		2	–	6	–	1
Arkansas State		–		2	–	6	–	0
Eastern Michigan		–		2	–	6	–	0
Rose Poly		–		2	–	6	–	0
Union (NY)		–		2	–	6	–	0
Cal Poly Pomona		–		2	–	7	–	0
Trinity (TX)		–		1	–	6	–	1
Carnegie Tech		–		1	–	6	–	0
Arlington State		–		1	–	8	–	0

The 1963 Tampa Spartans football team represented the University of Tampa in the 1963 NCAA College Division football season. It was the Spartans' 27th season. The team was led by head coach Fred Pancoast, in his second year, and played their home games at Phillips Field in Tampa, Florida. They finished with a record of four wins, five losses and one tie (4–5–1). Pancoast resigned as the Spartans' head coach on January 20, 1964, to take the position of ends coach at Florida.

== Schedule ==
Date	Opponent	Site	Result	Attendance	Source
September 21	Western Kentucky	Phillips Field; Tampa, FL	T 14–14	6,500	
September 26	National Polytechnic Institute	Phillips Field; Tampa, FL	W 33–14	4,000	
October 5	Southwestern Louisiana	Phillips Field; Tampa, FL	L 17–19	5,300	
October 12	at McNeese State	Wildcat Stadium; Lake Charles, LA	L 12–37	6,000	
October 19	Presbyterian^{†}	Phillips Field; Tampa, FL	W 26–0	9,000	
October 26	Eastern Kentucky	Phillips Field; Tampa, FL	W 7–3	8,000	
November 2	at Troy State	Veterans Memorial Stadium; Troy, AL	L 0–7	1,000	
November 9	at Ole Miss	Hemingway Stadium; Oxford, MS	L 0–41	15,800	
November 16	Wofford	Phillips Field; Tampa, FL	W 7–6	7,000	
November 23	East Carolina	Phillips Field; Tampa, FL	L 8–14	6,500	
^{†}Homecoming
