= 1963 Sam Houston State Bearkats football team =

American college football season

1963 Sam Houston State Bearkats football
- Conference: Lone Star Conference
- Record: 4–3–1 (2–3–1 LSC)
- Head coach: Paul Pierce (12th season)
- Home stadium: Pritchett Field

1963 Lone Star Conference football standings
	Conf.					Overall
Team	W		L		T	W		L		T
No. 7 Southwest Texas State $	6	–	0	–	0	10	–	0	–	0
East Texas State	4	–	2	–	0	7	–	2	–	1
Stephen F. Austin	4	–	2	–	0	7	–	3	–	0
Texas A&I	3	–	3	–	0	5	–	4	–	0
Sam Houston State	2	–	3	–	1	4	–	3	–	1
Howard Payne	1	–	5	–	0	3	–	7	–	0
Sul Ross	0	–	5	–	1	1	–	7	–	1
$ – Conference champion; Rankings from NAIA poll

The 1963 Sam Houston State Bearkats football team represented Sam Houston State Teachers College (now known as Sam Houston State University) as a member of the Lone Star Conference (LSC) during the 1963 NAIA football season. Led by 12th-year head coach Paul Pierce, the Bearkats compiled an overall record of 4–3–1 with a mark of 2–3–1 in conference play, and finished fifth in the LSC.

== Schedule ==
Date	Opponent	Site	Result	Attendance	Source
September 21	Tarleton State*	Pritchett Field; Huntsville, TX	W 21–0	6,500	
October 5	at Arlington State*	Memorial Stadium; Arlington, TX	W 34–28	7,000–7,500	
October 12	Howard Payne	Pritchett Field; Huntsville, TX	W 35–14	6,500	
October 19	at East Texas State	Memorial Stadium; Commerce, TX	L 12–21	8,000	
October 26	Texas A&I	Pritchett Field; Huntsville, TX	W 28–7	6,500	
November 2	at Southwest Texas State	Evans Field; San Marcos, TX	L 8–10	6,000	
November 9	Sul Ross	Pritchett Field; Huntsville, TX	T 21–21	7,500	
November 16	at Stephen F. Austin	Memorial Stadium; Nacogdoches, TX (rivalry)	L 13–14	10,500	
November 23	Lamar Tech*	Pritchett Field; Huntsville, TX	No contest	N/A	
*Non-conference game
