= 1963 Lamar Tech Cardinals football team =

American college football season

1963 Lamar Tech Cardinals football
- Conference: Independent
- Record: 5–4
- Head coach: Vernon Glass (1st season)
- Home stadium: Greenie Stadium

1963 NCAA College Division independents football records
	Conf.			Overall
Team	W	L	T	W		L		T
East Carolina		–		9	–	1	–	0
Abilene Christian		–		8	–	1	–	0
Northeastern		–		8	–	1	–	0
Wheaton (IL)		–		8	–	1	–	0
Mississippi Vocational		–		6	–	3	–	0
Santa Clara		–		6	–	3	–	0
St. Norbert		–		6	–	3	–	0
Arizona State–Flagstaff		–		5	–	3	–	1
Howard (AL)		–		5	–	3	–	1
Cortland		–		4	–	3	–	0
Lamar Tech		–		5	–	4	–	0
Parsons		–		5	–	4	–	0
Drake		–		4	–	4	–	0
Hawaii		–		5	–	5	–	0
Northern Michigan		–		4	–	4	–	1
Southern Connecticut State		–		4	–	4	–	0
Wabash		–		4	–	4	–	1
Tampa		–		4	–	5	–	1
Southern Illinois		–		4	–	5	–	0
UC Riverside		–		4	–	5	–	0
UC Santa Barbara		–		4	–	5	–	0
Chattanooga		–		4	–	6	–	0
Lake Forest		–		2	–	4	–	1
Hardin–Simmons		–		2	–	6	–	1
Arkansas State		–		2	–	6	–	0
Eastern Michigan		–		2	–	6	–	0
Rose Poly		–		2	–	6	–	0
Union (NY)		–		2	–	6	–	0
Cal Poly Pomona		–		2	–	7	–	0
Trinity (TX)		–		1	–	6	–	1
Carnegie Tech		–		1	–	6	–	0
Arlington State		–		1	–	8	–	0

The 1963 Lamar Tech Cardinals football season represented Lamar State College of Technology—now known as Lamar University—as an independent during the 1963 NCAA College Division football season. Led by first-year head coach Vernon Glass, the Cardinals compiled a record of 5–4. Lamar Tech played home games at Greenie Stadium, located off-campus at South Park High School in Beaumont, Texas, for the final season. In 1964, the team moved to the newly-opened Cardinal Stadium—now known as Provost Umphrey Stadium, located of Lamar Tech's campus.

== Schedule ==
Date	Opponent	Site	Result	Attendance	Source
September 28	at Abilene Christian*	Shotwell Stadium; Abilene, TX	L 0–25	6,000	
October 5	Trinity (TX)*	Greenie Stadium; Beaumont, TX	W 20–18	6,500	
October 12	Stephen F. Austin*	Greenie Stadium; Beaumont, TX	L 6–26	7,000	
October 19	Sul Ross*	Greenie Stadium; Beaumont, TX	W 15–7	4,000	
October 26	at Southwest Texas State*	Evans Field; San Marcos, TX	L 7–13	6,500	
November 2	Howard Payne*	Greenie Stadium; Beaumont, TX	W 35–0	4,000	
November 9	at Texas A&I*	Javelina Stadium; Kingsville, TX	W 16–14	7,500	
November 16	East Texas State*	Greenie Stadium; Beaumont, TX	L 0–10	8,300	
November 23	at Sam Houston State	Pritchett Field; Huntsville, TX	No contest		
December 7	at Mexico Polytechical Institute*	Estadio Olímpico Universitario; Mexico City, Mexico	W 33–26	48,000	
*Non-conference game
