= 1963 Eastern Michigan Hurons football team =

American college football season

1963 Eastern Michigan Hurons football
- Conference: Independent
- Record: 2–6
- Head coach: Fred Trosko (12th season)
- Captains: Dempster Ross; Terry Hurley
- Home stadium: Briggs Field

1963 NCAA College Division independents football records
	Conf.			Overall
Team	W	L	T	W		L		T
East Carolina		–		9	–	1	–	0
Abilene Christian		–		8	–	1	–	0
Northeastern		–		8	–	1	–	0
Wheaton (IL)		–		8	–	1	–	0
Mississippi Vocational		–		6	–	3	–	0
Santa Clara		–		6	–	3	–	0
St. Norbert		–		6	–	3	–	0
Arizona State–Flagstaff		–		5	–	3	–	1
Howard (AL)		–		5	–	3	–	1
Cortland		–		4	–	3	–	0
Lamar Tech		–		5	–	4	–	0
Parsons		–		5	–	4	–	0
Drake		–		4	–	4	–	0
Hawaii		–		5	–	5	–	0
Northern Michigan		–		4	–	4	–	1
Southern Connecticut State		–		4	–	4	–	0
Wabash		–		4	–	4	–	1
Tampa		–		4	–	5	–	1
Southern Illinois		–		4	–	5	–	0
UC Riverside		–		4	–	5	–	0
UC Santa Barbara		–		4	–	5	–	0
Chattanooga		–		4	–	6	–	0
Lake Forest		–		2	–	4	–	1
Hardin–Simmons		–		2	–	6	–	1
Arkansas State		–		2	–	6	–	0
Eastern Michigan		–		2	–	6	–	0
Rose Poly		–		2	–	6	–	0
Union (NY)		–		2	–	6	–	0
Cal Poly Pomona		–		2	–	7	–	0
Trinity (TX)		–		1	–	6	–	1
Carnegie Tech		–		1	–	6	–	0
Arlington State		–		1	–	8	–	0

The 1963 Eastern Michigan Hurons football team represented Eastern Michigan University as an independent during the 1963 NCAA College Division football season. In their 12th season under head coach Fred Trosko, the Hurons compiled a 2–6 record and were outscored by their opponents, 201 to 96. The team's two victories were against Kalamazoo College and Adrian College. Dempster Ross and Terry Hurley were the team captains.

== Schedule ==
Date	Opponent	Site	Result	Attendance	Source
September 21	at Ball State	Ball State Field; Muncie, IN	L 6–22	10,000	
September 28	at Kalamazoo	Kalamazoo, MI	W 13–12		
October 4	Ohio Northern	Briggs Field; Ypsilanti, MI	L 7–20		
October 11	Baldwin–Wallace	Briggs Field; Ypsilanti, MI	L 13–27		
October 19	at Findlay	Findlay, OH	L 18–48		
October 25	Adrian	Briggs Field; Ypsilanti, MI	W 13–0		
November 2	Central Michigan^{†}	Briggs Field; Ypsilanti, MI (rivalry)	L 20–55	5,550	
November 9	at Albion	Albion, MI	L 6–17		
^{†}Homecoming
