= 1963 Chattanooga Moccasins football team =

American college football season

1963 Chattanooga Moccasins football
- Conference: Independent
- Record: 4–6
- Head coach: Scrappy Moore (33rd season)
- Home stadium: Chamberlain Field

1963 NCAA College Division independents football records
| | Conf. | | | Overall |
| Team | W | L | T | W | | L | | T |
|---|---|---|---|---|---|---|---|---|
| East Carolina | | – | | 9 | – | 1 | – | 0 |
| Abilene Christian | | – | | 8 | – | 1 | – | 0 |
| Northeastern | | – | | 8 | – | 1 | – | 0 |
| Wheaton (IL) | | – | | 8 | – | 1 | – | 0 |
| Mississippi Vocational | | – | | 6 | – | 3 | – | 0 |
| Santa Clara | | – | | 6 | – | 3 | – | 0 |
| St. Norbert | | – | | 6 | – | 3 | – | 0 |
| Arizona State–Flagstaff | | – | | 5 | – | 3 | – | 1 |
| Howard (AL) | | – | | 5 | – | 3 | – | 1 |
| Cortland | | – | | 4 | – | 3 | – | 0 |
| Lamar Tech | | – | | 5 | – | 4 | – | 0 |
| Drake | | – | | 4 | – | 4 | – | 0 |
| Hawaii | | – | | 5 | – | 5 | – | 0 |
| Northern Michigan | | – | | 4 | – | 4 | – | 1 |
| Southern Connecticut State | | – | | 4 | – | 4 | – | 0 |
| Wabash | | – | | 4 | – | 4 | – | 1 |
| Tampa | | – | | 4 | – | 5 | – | 1 |
| Southern Illinois | | – | | 4 | – | 5 | – | 0 |
| UC Riverside | | – | | 4 | – | 5 | – | 0 |
| UC Santa Barbara | | – | | 4 | – | 5 | – | 0 |
| Chattanooga | | – | | 4 | – | 6 | – | 0 |
| Lake Forest | | – | | 2 | – | 4 | – | 1 |
| Hardin–Simmons | | – | | 2 | – | 6 | – | 1 |
| Arkansas State | | – | | 2 | – | 6 | – | 0 |
| Eastern Michigan | | – | | 2 | – | 6 | – | 0 |
| Rose Poly | | – | | 2 | – | 6 | – | 0 |
| Union (NY) | | – | | 2 | – | 6 | – | 0 |
| Cal Poly Pomona | | – | | 2 | – | 7 | – | 0 |
| Trinity (TX) | | – | | 1 | – | 6 | – | 1 |
| Carnegie Tech | | – | | 1 | – | 6 | – | 0 |
| Arlington State | | – | | 1 | – | 8 | – | 0 |

The 1963 Chattanooga Moccasins football team was an American football team that represented the University of Chattanooga (now known as the University of Tennessee at Chattanooga) during the 1963 NCAA College Division football season. In their 33rd year under head coach Scrappy Moore, the team compiled a 4–6 record.

== Schedule ==
| Date | Opponent | Site | Result | Attendance | Source |
|---|---|---|---|---|---|
| September 21 | Northeast Louisiana State | Chamberlain Field; Chattanooga, TN | W 9–0 | 6,000 | |
| September 28 | Tennessee Tech | Chamberlain Field; Chattanooga, TN | L 5–7 | 6,500 | |
| October 5 | East Tennessee State | Chamberlain Field; Chattanooga, TN | L 22–27 | | |
| October 12 | at Auburn | Cliff Hare Stadium; Auburn, AL | L 0–28 | 25,000 | |
| October 19 | at Middle Tennessee | Horace Jones Field; Murfreesboro, TN | W 7–0 | 7,000 | |
| October 26 | at Tennessee | Neyland Stadium; Knoxville, TN | L 7–49 | 22,000 | |
| November 2 | Jacksonville State | Chamberlain Field; Chattanooga, TN | W 14–0 | | |
| November 9 | Florence State^{†} | Chamberlain Field; Chattanooga, TN | W 25–6 | 5,000 | |
| November 16 | at Memphis State | Crump Stadium; Memphis, TN | L 0–13 | 12,884 | |
| November 28 | Southern Miss | Chamberlain Field; Chattanooga, TN | L 0–24 | 6,000 | |
^{†}Homecoming
