= 1963 Arlington State Rebels football team =

American college football season

1963 Arlington State Rebels football
- Conference: Independent
- Record: 1–8
- Head coach: Chena Gilstrap (11th season)
- Home stadium: Memorial Stadium

1963 NCAA College Division independents football records
	Conf.			Overall
Team	W	L	T	W		L		T
East Carolina		–		9	–	1	–	0
Abilene Christian		–		8	–	1	–	0
Northeastern		–		8	–	1	–	0
Wheaton (IL)		–		8	–	1	–	0
Mississippi Vocational		–		6	–	3	–	0
Santa Clara		–		6	–	3	–	0
St. Norbert		–		6	–	3	–	0
Arizona State–Flagstaff		–		5	–	3	–	1
Howard (AL)		–		5	–	3	–	1
Cortland		–		4	–	3	–	0
Lamar Tech		–		5	–	4	–	0
Parsons		–		5	–	4	–	0
Drake		–		4	–	4	–	0
Hawaii		–		5	–	5	–	0
Northern Michigan		–		4	–	4	–	1
Southern Connecticut State		–		4	–	4	–	0
Wabash		–		4	–	4	–	1
Tampa		–		4	–	5	–	1
Southern Illinois		–		4	–	5	–	0
UC Riverside		–		4	–	5	–	0
UC Santa Barbara		–		4	–	5	–	0
Chattanooga		–		4	–	6	–	0
Lake Forest		–		2	–	4	–	1
Hardin–Simmons		–		2	–	6	–	1
Arkansas State		–		2	–	6	–	0
Eastern Michigan		–		2	–	6	–	0
Rose Poly		–		2	–	6	–	0
Union (NY)		–		2	–	6	–	0
Cal Poly Pomona		–		2	–	7	–	0
Trinity (TX)		–		1	–	6	–	1
Carnegie Tech		–		1	–	6	–	0
Arlington State		–		1	–	8	–	0

The 1963 Arlington State Rebels football team was an American football team that represented Arlington State College (now known as the University of Texas at Arlington) as an independent during the 1963 NCAA College Division football season. In their eleventh year under head coach Chena Gilstrap, the team compiled a 1–8 record. The Rebels season finale against Hardin–Simmons scheduled for November 23 at Memorial Stadium was canceled in deference to the assassination of John F. Kennedy which occurred the previous day at Dallas.

== Schedule ==
Date	Opponent	Site	Result	Attendance	Source
September 21	at West Texas State	Buffalo Bowl; Canyon, TX	L 17–22	15,900–15,945	
September 28	at East Texas State	Memorial Stadium; Commerce, TX	L 8–17	8,000	
October 5	Sam Houston State	Memorial Stadium; Arlington, TX	L 28–34	7,000–7,500	
October 12	at Southeastern Louisiana	Strawberry Stadium; Hammond, LA	W 14–13	5,500	
October 19	at McMurry	Shotwell Stadium; Abilene, TX	L 7–27	3,500	
October 26	Louisiana Tech	Memorial Stadium; Arlington, TX	L 14–34	6,500	
November 2	Northeast Louisiana State	Memorial Stadium; Arlington, TX	L 12–21	6,500	
November 9	Abilene Christian	Memorial Stadium; Arlington, TX	L 14–55	4,500–7,000	
November 16	at Trinity (TX)	Alamo Stadium; San Antonio, TX	L 7–12	1,377	
November 23	Hardin–Simmons	Memorial Stadium; Arlington, TX	Cancelled		
