= 1963 Arkansas State Indians football team =

American college football season

1963 Arkansas State Indians football
- Conference: Independent
- Record: 2–6
- Head coach: Bennie Ellender (1st season)
- Home stadium: Kays Stadium

1963 NCAA College Division independents football records
	Conf.			Overall
Team	W	L	T	W		L		T
East Carolina		–		9	–	1	–	0
Abilene Christian		–		8	–	1	–	0
Northeastern		–		8	–	1	–	0
Mississippi Vocational		–		6	–	3	–	0
Santa Clara		–		6	–	3	–	0
St. Norbert		–		6	–	3	–	0
Arizona State–Flagstaff		–		5	–	3	–	1
Howard (AL)		–		5	–	3	–	1
Cortland		–		4	–	3	–	0
Lamar Tech		–		5	–	4	–	0
Parsons		–		5	–	4	–	0
Drake		–		4	–	4	–	0
Hawaii		–		5	–	5	–	0
Northern Michigan		–		4	–	4	–	1
Southern Connecticut State		–		4	–	4	–	0
Wabash		–		4	–	4	–	1
Tampa		–		4	–	5	–	1
Southern Illinois		–		4	–	5	–	0
UC Riverside		–		4	–	5	–	0
UC Santa Barbara		–		4	–	5	–	0
Chattanooga		–		4	–	6	–	0
Lake Forest		–		2	–	4	–	1
Hardin–Simmons		–		2	–	6	–	1
Arkansas State		–		2	–	6	–	0
Eastern Michigan		–		2	–	6	–	0
Rose Poly		–		2	–	6	–	0
Union (NY)		–		2	–	6	–	0
Cal Poly Pomona		–		2	–	7	–	0
Trinity (TX)		–		1	–	6	–	1
Carnegie Tech		–		1	–	6	–	0
Arlington State		–		1	–	8	–	0

The 1963 Arkansas State Indians football team represented Arkansas State College—now known as Arkansas State University—as an independent during the 1963 NCAA College Division football season. Led by first-year head coach Bennie Ellender, the Indians compiled a record of 2–6.

== Schedule ==
Date	Opponent	Site	Result	Attendance	Source
September 21	Tennessee Tech	Kays Stadium; Jonesboro, AR	L 0–42		
September 28	Florence State	Kays Stadium; Jonesboro, AR	W 14–12		
October 5	Saint Mary (KS)	Kays Stadium; Jonesboro, AR	W 68–7		
October 19	at The Citadel	Johnson Hagood Stadium; Charleston, SC	L 9–10	9,500	
October 26	at Southern Miss	Faulkner Field; Hattiesburg, MS	L 0–25	7,500	
November 2	Murray State	Kays Stadium; Jonesboro, AR	L 33–34		
November 9	at Delta State	Delta Field; Cleveland, MS	L 21–27		
November 16	South Dakota State	Kays Stadium; Jonesboro, AR	L 14–17	3,000	
