= 1963 Southwest Texas State Bobcats football team =

American college football season

1963 Southwest Texas State Bobcats football

LSC champion
- Conference: Lone Star Conference
- Record: 10–0 (7–0 LSC)
- Head coach: Milton Jowers (6th season)
- Home stadium: Evans Field

1963 Lone Star Conference football standings
	Conf.					Overall
Team	W		L		T	W		L		T
No. 7 Southwest Texas State $	6	–	0	–	0	10	–	0	–	0
East Texas State	4	–	2	–	0	7	–	2	–	1
Stephen F. Austin	4	–	2	–	0	7	–	3	–	0
Texas A&I	3	–	3	–	0	5	–	4	–	0
Sam Houston State	2	–	3	–	1	4	–	3	–	1
Howard Payne	1	–	5	–	0	3	–	7	–	0
Sul Ross	0	–	5	–	1	1	–	7	–	1
$ – Conference champion; Rankings from NAIA poll

The 1963 Southwest Texas State Bobcats football team was an American football team that represented Southwest Texas State College (now known as Texas State University) during the 1963 NCAA College Division football season as a member of the Lone Star Conference (LSC). In their sixth year under head coach Milton Jowers, the team compiled an overall record of 10–0 with a mark of 7–0 in conference play.

== Schedule ==
Date	Opponent	Site	Result	Attendance	Source
September 21	at Texas Lutheran*	Matador Field; Seguin, TX	W 21–8	5,500–6,000	
September 28	Trinity (TX)*	Evans Field; San Marcos, TX	W 14–0	6,000	
October 5	at Sul Ross	Jackson Field; Alpine, TX	W 9–7	3,000–4,500	
October 12	McMurry*	Evans Field; San Marcos, TX	W 46–6	4,837–5,000	
October 19	at Stephen F. Austin	Memorial Stadium; Nacogdoches, TX	W 20–17	5,000	
October 26	Lamar Tech*	Evans Field; San Marcos, TX	W 13–7	6,000–6,500	
November 2	Sam Houston State	Evans Field; San Marcos, TX (rivalry)	W 10–8	6,000	
November 9	at East Texas State	Memorial Stadium; Commerce, TX	W 24–16	10,000	
November 16	Howard Payne	Evans Field; San Marcos, TX	W 33–6	4,500	
November 23	at Texas A&I	Javelina Stadium; Kingsville, TX	W 20–6	9,700–10,000	
*Non-conference game
