= 1963 small college football rankings =

- Selectors: AP, UPI
- No. 1: Northern Illinois (AP)
- No. 1: Delaware (UPI)
- Small college football rankings (AP, UPI)
- «1962 1964»

The 1963 small college football rankings are rankings of college football teams representing smaller college and university teams during the 1963 college football season, including the 1963 NCAA College Division football season and the 1963 NAIA football season. Separate rankings were published by the Associated Press (AP) and the United Press International (UPI). The AP rankings were selected by a board of sports writers, and the UPI rankings were selected by a board of small-college coaches.

In the final AP poll, the 1963 Northern Illinois Huskies football team (10–0) was rated as the small-college champion. The Huskies were led by the record-setting passing of quarterback George Bork.

In the final UPI poll, the 1963 Delaware Fightin' Blue Hens football team (8–0) was rated as the small-college champion. Delaware was ranked No. 2 in the AP poll.

== Legend ==
	Increase in ranking
	Decrease in ranking
	Not ranked previous week
(#–#)	Win–loss record
(Italics)	Number of first place votes
т	Tied with team above or below also with this symbol

== AP poll ==
	Week 1 Oct 17	Week 2 Oct 24	Week 3 Oct 31	Week 4 Nov 7	Week 5 Nov 14	Week 6 Nov 21	Week 7 Nov 28	
1.	Northern Illinois	Northern Illinois (6–0)	Northern Illinois (7–0) (3)	Northern Illinois (8–0) (3)	Delaware (7–0) (3)	Delaware (8–0) (5)	Northern Illinois (9–0) (3)	1.
2.	Florida A&M	Florida A&M (3–0)	Delaware (5–0) (3)	Delaware (6–0) (4)	Northern Illinois (9–0) (4)	Northern Illinois (9–0) (2)	Delaware (8–0) (3)	2.
3.	Texas A&I	Delaware (4–0)	Florida A&M (3–1)	Florida A&M (4–1)	Wittenberg (7–0–1)	Wittenberg (8–0–1)	Wittenberg (8–0–1)	3.
4.	Delaware	Wittenberg (4–0–1)	Wittenberg (5–0–1)	Wittenberg (6–0–1)	UMass (6–0–1) т	UMass (7–0–1)	UMass (7–0–1)	4.
5.	San Diego State	Texas A&I (4–0)	South Dakota State (6–1)	South Dakota State (7–1)	Saint John's (MN) (8–0) т	Florida A&M (6–1)	Saint John's (MN) (8–0)	5.
6.	Saint John's (MN)	Saint John's (MN)	Saint John's (MN) (7–0)	Saint John's (MN) (8–0)	South Dakota State (6–1) т	Saint John's (MN) (8–0)	South Dakota State (7–1)	6.
7.	Kearney State	South Dakota State (5–1)	Texas A&I (4–1)	UMass (5–0–1)	Florida A&M (5–1)	South Dakota State (7–1)	Florida A&M (7–1)	7.
8.	Clarion State	Kearney State	UMass (5–0–1)	San Diego State (5–1)	San Diego State (6–1)	McNeese State (7–0)	Abilene Christian (7–1)	8.
9.	College of Emporia	McNeese State	Kearney State (7–0)	McNeese State (5–0)	McNeese State (6–0)	San Diego State (7–1)	Southwest Texas (10–0)	9.
10.	McNeese State	San Diego State (3–0)	San Diego State (4–1)	Kearney State (8–0) т	Slippery Rock (6–1)	Abilene Christian (8–0)	McNeese State (8–0)	10.
11.				Slippery Rock (6–0) т				11.
	Week 1 Oct 17	Week 2 Oct 24	Week 3 Oct 31	Week 4 Nov 7	Week 5 Nov 14	Week 6 Nov 21	Week 7 Nov 28	
		Dropped: 8 Clarion State; 9 College of Emporia	Dropped: 9 McNeese State	Dropped: 7 Texas A&I	Dropped: 10 Kearney State	Dropped: 10 Slippery Rock	Dropped: 9 San Diego State	

== UPI coaches poll ==
	Week 1 Oct 2	Week 2 Oct 9	Week 3 Oct 16	Week 4 Oct 23	Week 5 Oct 30	Week 6 Nov 6	Week 7 Nov 13	Week 8 Nov 20	Week 9 Nov 27	Week 10 Dec 4	
1.	Florida A&M (1–0) (7)	Florida A&M (2–0) (5)	Northern Illinois (5–0) (5)	Northern Illinois (6–0) (12)	Northern Illinois (7–0) (14)	Delaware (6–0) (16)	Delaware (7–0) (15)	Delaware (8–0) (18)	Delaware (8–0) (18)	Delaware (8–0) (18)	1.
2.	Delaware (1–0) (2)	Northern Illinois (4–0) (6)	Florida A&M (2–0) (8)	Delaware (4–0) (12)	Delaware (5–0) (15)	Northern Illinois (8–0) (12)	Northern Illinois (9–0) (14)	Northern Illinois (9–0) (9)	Northern Illinois (9–0) (9)	Northern Illinois (10–0) (8)	2.
3.	Northern Illinois (3–0) (3)	Delaware (2–0) (9)	Delaware (3–0) (9)	Florida A&M (3–0) (4)	Florida A&M (4–1) (3)	Florida A&M (5–1) (2)	UMass (7–0–1) (1)	Florida A&M (7–1) (1)	Florida A&M (8–1) (1)	UMass (8–0–1) (1)	3.
4.	Lenoir–Rhyne (2–0) (2)	Texas A&I (3–0) (5)	Texas A&I (4–0) (4)	Texas A&I (4–0) (2)	Wittenberg (5–0–1) (1)	Wittenberg (6–0–1)	Florida A&M (6–1) (1)	Wittenberg (8–0–1)	Wittenberg (8–0–1)	Saint John's (MN) (9–0) (1)	4.
5.	Central Oklahoma (1–1) (1)	Montana State (2–2) (2)	San Diego State (3–0) (3)	San Diego State (3–0)	Texas A&I (4–1)	UMass (6–0–1)	Wittenberg (7–0–1)	UMass (8–0–1) (1)	UMass (8–0–1) (1)	Wittenberg (8–0–1)	5.
6.	Montana State (1–2) (1)	San Diego State (2–0) (4)	Montana State (3–0) (3)	Wittenberg (4–0–1) (1)	UMass (5–0–1) (1)	San Diego State (5–1) (1)	San Diego State (6–1) (1)	San Diego State (7–1) (1)	San Diego State (7–1) (1)	Florida A&M (8–2) (1)	6.
7.	San Diego State (1–0) (2)	Wittenberg (2–0–1) (1)	Wittenberg (3–0) (1)	Montana State (4–2) (2)	San Diego State (4–1)	Western Kentucky (6–0–1) (1) т	Saint John's (MN) (8–0)	Saint John's (MN) (8–0)	Saint John's (MN) (8–0) (1)	San Diego State (7–2) (1)	7.
8.	Texas A&I (2–0) (1) т	Lenoir–Rhyne (2–1)	Central Oklahoma (2–2)	UMass (4–0–1)	Western Kentucky (5–0–1)	Texas A&I (4–2) (1) т	Western Kentucky (7–0–1) (1)	Southwest Missouri State (9–0) (1)	Western Kentucky (8–0–1) (1)	Western Kentucky (8–0–1) (2)	8.
9.	Wittenberg (1–0–1) т	Central Oklahoma (2–1)	UMass (3–0–1)	Western Kentucky (4–0–1)	South Dakota State (6–1)	Saint John's (MN) (8–0)	Texas A&I (4–3)	Western Kentucky (7–0–1) (1)	Southwest Missouri State (9–0) (1)	Northeast Oklahoma State (10–0)	9.
10.	East Carolina (2–0) (1)	East Carolina (3–1)	Western Kentucky (3–0–1)	South Dakota State (5–1)	Saint John's (MN) (7–0)	South Dakota State (6–1)	Southwest Missouri State (8–0)	Texas A&I (5–3)	Northeast Oklahoma State (10–0) (1)	Southwest Missouri State (9–1)	10.
11.	Pittsburg State	Tennessee Tech	East Carolina	McNeese State (1)	Washington University	Washington University т	McNeese State (6–0) (1) т	Abilene Christian (7–1) (1)	Abilene Christian (7–1)	Abilene Christian (1)	11.
12.	Omaha	East Central Oklahoma	McNeese State (1) т	Western State (CO)	Lewis and Clark	Southwest Missouri State т	South Dakota State (6–1) т	Northeast Oklahoma State	South Dakota State (7–1)	McNeese State	12.
13.	Tennessee Tech (1)	South Dakota State	Fresno State т	Lewis and Clark	Western State (CO)	East Carolina	Lewis and Clark (1)	East Carolina	East Carolina	South Dakota State	13.
14.	South Dakota State	UMass	South Dakota State т	Fresno State	Fresno State	Western State (CO)	Abilene Christian	McNeese State (7–0) (1) т	McNeese State (8–0) (1)	Southwest Texas State (1)	14.
15.	UMass (2)	San Francisco State	Saint John's (MN) т	Saint John's (MN)	Montana State	Lewis and Clark (1)	Montana State	Southwest Texas State т	Southwest Texas State	Luther	15.
16.	Central Michigan (1)	Saint John's (MN) т	Lenoir–Rhyne	East Tennessee State	East Carolina	Northeast Oklahoma State т	East Carolina	Luther	Luther	Lewis and Clark (1)	16.
17.	Middle Tennessee (1) т	Western Kentucky т	Lewis and Clark	Northeast Oklahoma State	McNeese State т	McNeese State (5–0) (1) т	Luther	Lewis and Clark (1)	Lewis and Clark (1)	Central Washington	17.
18.	East Texas State (1) т	Central Michigan	Wheaton (IL) т	East Carolina	Northeast Oklahoma State т	Southwest Texas State т	Northeast Oklahoma State	Kearney State т	Kearney State	East Carolina	18.
19.	Humboldt State (1)	Linfield т	Louisiana Tech т	Los Angeles State (1)	Idaho State т	Montana State	Southwest Texas State	Prairie View т	Prairie View (1)	Texas A&I	19.
20.	Butler	McNeese State т	Western State (CO)	College of Emporia	Louisiana Tech т	Luther	Washington University	Montana State	Montana State	Montana State	20.
21.		Fresno State т			Southwest Texas State т						21.
	Week 1 Oct 2	Week 2 Oct 9	Week 3 Oct 16	Week 4 Oct 23	Week 5 Oct 30	Week 6 Nov 6	Week 7 Nov 13	Week 8 Nov 20	Week 9 Nov 27	Week 10 Dec 4	
		Dropped: 11 Pittsburg State; 12 Omaha; 17 Middle Tennessee; 18 East Texas State; 19 Humboldt State; 20 Butler	Dropped: 11 Tennessee Tech; 12 East Central Oklahoma; 15 San Francisco State; 18 Central Michigan; 19 Linfield	Dropped: 8 Central Oklahoma; 16 Lenoir–Rhyne; 18 Wheaton (IL); 19 Louisiana Tech	Dropped: 16 East Tennessee State; 19 Los Angeles State; 20 College of Emporia	Dropped: 14 Fresno State; 19 Idaho State; 20 Louisiana Tech	Dropped: 14 Western State (CO)	Dropped: 12 South Dakota State; 20 Washington University	Dropped: 10 Texas A&I	Dropped: 18 Kearney State; 19 Prairie View	

== Pittsburgh Courier rankings ==
The Pittsburgh Courier, a leading African American newspaper, ranked the top 1963 teams from historically black colleges and universities in an era when college football was often racially segregated.

The rankings were published on December 7:

- 1. Prairie View A&M (10–1)
- 2. North Carolina College (8–1)
- 3. Morgan State (8–1)
- 4. Florida A&M (7–2)
- 5. Southern (7–3)
- 6. Texas Southern (7–3)
- 7. Arkansas AM&N (5–4–1)
- 8. Grambling (5–3–1)
- 9. Virginia Union (7–2)
- 10. North Carolina A&T (7–3)
- 11. Tennessee State (6–3)
- 12. South Carolina State (8–1)
- 13. Alabama A&M (8–0)
- 14. Bethune-Cookman (7–2)
- 15. Clark (7–1)
- 16. Johnson C. Smith (6–2)
