= 1963 Southern Illinois Salukis football team =

American college football season

1963 Southern Illinois Salukis football
- Conference: Independent
- Record: 4–5
- Head coach: Carmen Piccone (5th season)
- Home stadium: McAndrew Stadium

1963 NCAA College Division independents football records
	Conf.			Overall
Team	W	L	T	W		L		T
East Carolina		–		9	–	1	–	0
Abilene Christian		–		8	–	1	–	0
Northeastern		–		8	–	1	–	0
Wheaton (IL)		–		8	–	1	–	0
Mississippi Vocational		–		6	–	3	–	0
Santa Clara		–		6	–	3	–	0
St. Norbert		–		6	–	3	–	0
Arizona State–Flagstaff		–		5	–	3	–	1
Howard (AL)		–		5	–	3	–	1
Cortland		–		4	–	3	–	0
Lamar Tech		–		5	–	4	–	0
Parsons		–		5	–	4	–	0
Drake		–		4	–	4	–	0
Hawaii		–		5	–	5	–	0
Northern Michigan		–		4	–	4	–	1
Southern Connecticut State		–		4	–	4	–	0
Wabash		–		4	–	4	–	1
Tampa		–		4	–	5	–	1
Southern Illinois		–		4	–	5	–	0
UC Riverside		–		4	–	5	–	0
UC Santa Barbara		–		4	–	5	–	0
Chattanooga		–		4	–	6	–	0
Lake Forest		–		2	–	4	–	1
Hardin–Simmons		–		2	–	6	–	1
Arkansas State		–		2	–	6	–	0
Eastern Michigan		–		2	–	6	–	0
Rose Poly		–		2	–	6	–	0
Union (NY)		–		2	–	6	–	0
Cal Poly Pomona		–		2	–	7	–	0
Trinity (TX)		–		1	–	6	–	1
Carnegie Tech		–		1	–	6	–	0
Arlington State		–		1	–	8	–	0

The 1963 Southern Illinois Salukis football team was an American football team that represented Southern Illinois University (now known as Southern Illinois University Carbondale) as an independent during the 1963 NCAA College Division football season. Under fifth-year head coach Carmen Piccone, the team compiled a 4–5 record. The team played its home games at McAndrew Stadium in Carbondale, Illinois. The Salukis game against North Texas State scheduled for November 23 at Fouts Field was canceled in deference to the assassination of John F. Kennedy which occurred the previous day at Dallas.

== Schedule ==
Date	Opponent	Site	Result	Attendance	Source
September 21	at Evansville	Reitz Bowl; Evansville, IN	L 14–15	2,500–4,000	
September 28	Bowling Green	McAndrew Stadium; Carbondale, IL	L 6–31	12,500	
October 5	at Louisville	Fairgrounds Stadium; Louisville, KY	W 13–7	11,789	
October 12	Lincoln (MO)	McAndrew Stadium; Carbondale, IL	W 47–8	8,500	
October 19	Northern Michigan	McAndrew Stadium; Carbondale, IL	W 27–0	14,000	
October 26	Fort Campbell	McAndrew Stadium; Carbondale, IL	L 13–14	10,500	
November 2	at Tulsa	Skelly Field; Tulsa, OK	L 6–49	7,500–7,634	
November 9	North Dakota State	McAndrew Stadium; Carbondale, IL	W 20–15	11,101–11,500	
November 16	at Toledo	Glass Bowl; Toledo, OH	L 0–14	6,800–6,870	
November 23	at North Texas State	Fouts Field; Denton, TX	Canceled		
