= 1963 Northeastern Huskies football team =

American college football season

1963 Northeastern Huskies football

Eastern Bowl, L 6–27 vs. East Carolina
- Conference: Independent
- Record: 8–1
- Head coach: Joe Zabilski (16th season)
- Captain: Joe Davis
- Home stadium: Kent Street Field

1963 NCAA College Division independents football records
| | Conf. | | | Overall |
| Team | W | L | T | W | | L | | T |
|---|---|---|---|---|---|---|---|---|
| East Carolina | | – | | 9 | – | 1 | – | 0 |
| Abilene Christian | | – | | 8 | – | 1 | – | 0 |
| Northeastern | | – | | 8 | – | 1 | – | 0 |
| Wheaton (IL) | | – | | 8 | – | 1 | – | 0 |
| Mississippi Vocational | | – | | 6 | – | 3 | – | 0 |
| Santa Clara | | – | | 6 | – | 3 | – | 0 |
| St. Norbert | | – | | 6 | – | 3 | – | 0 |
| Arizona State–Flagstaff | | – | | 5 | – | 3 | – | 1 |
| Howard (AL) | | – | | 5 | – | 3 | – | 1 |
| Cortland | | – | | 4 | – | 3 | – | 0 |
| Lamar Tech | | – | | 5 | – | 4 | – | 0 |
| Drake | | – | | 4 | – | 4 | – | 0 |
| Hawaii | | – | | 5 | – | 5 | – | 0 |
| Northern Michigan | | – | | 4 | – | 4 | – | 1 |
| Southern Connecticut State | | – | | 4 | – | 4 | – | 0 |
| Wabash | | – | | 4 | – | 4 | – | 1 |
| Tampa | | – | | 4 | – | 5 | – | 1 |
| Southern Illinois | | – | | 4 | – | 5 | – | 0 |
| UC Riverside | | – | | 4 | – | 5 | – | 0 |
| UC Santa Barbara | | – | | 4 | – | 5 | – | 0 |
| Chattanooga | | – | | 4 | – | 6 | – | 0 |
| Lake Forest | | – | | 2 | – | 4 | – | 1 |
| Hardin–Simmons | | – | | 2 | – | 6 | – | 1 |
| Arkansas State | | – | | 2 | – | 6 | – | 0 |
| Eastern Michigan | | – | | 2 | – | 6 | – | 0 |
| Rose Poly | | – | | 2 | – | 6 | – | 0 |
| Union (NY) | | – | | 2 | – | 6 | – | 0 |
| Cal Poly Pomona | | – | | 2 | – | 7 | – | 0 |
| Trinity (TX) | | – | | 1 | – | 6 | – | 1 |
| Carnegie Tech | | – | | 1 | – | 6 | – | 0 |
| Arlington State | | – | | 1 | – | 8 | – | 0 |

The 1963 Northeastern Huskies football team represented Northeastern University during the 1963 NCAA College Division football season. It was the program's 28th season and they finished with an overall record of 8–1. After an undefeated regular season in which Northeastern went 8–0 and outscored their opponents 237 to 42, they were invited to their first (and program's only) bowl game – the Eastern Bowl, played in Allentown, Pennsylvania, where the Huskies lost to East Carolina, 27–6. Their head coach was Joe Zabilski and their captain was All-American Joe Davis.

== Schedule ==
| Date | Opponent | Site | Result | Attendance | Source |
|---|---|---|---|---|---|
| September 21 | Rhode Island | Kent Street Field; Brookline, MA | W 28–13 | 6,500 | |
| September 28 | Bridgeport | Kent Street Field; Brookline, MA | W 20–9 | 4,780 | |
| October 5 | Bates | Kent Street Field; Brookline, MA | W 41–6 | 6,115 | |
| October 12 | at American International | Springfield, MA | W 35–8 | 2,500 | |
| October 19 | Springfield | Kent Street Field; Brookline, MA | W 14–0 | 8,649 | |
| October 26 | at New Hampshire | Cowell Stadium; Durham, NH | W 26–0 | 7,200–7,250 | |
| November 2 | at Merchant Marine | Tomb Memorial Field; Kings Point, NY | W 39–6 | 2,500 | |
| November 9 | Tufts | Kent Street Field; Brookline, MA | W 34–0 | 5,330 | |
| December 14 | vs. East Carolina | J. Birney Crum Stadium; Allentown, PA (Eastern Bowl) | L 6–27 | 2,800 | |
