= 1963 Hardin–Simmons Cowboys football team =

American college football season

1963 Hardin–Simmons Cowboys football
- Conference: Independent
- Record: 2–6–1
- Head coach: Floyd Huggins (1st season)
- Home stadium: Shotwell Stadium

1963 NCAA College Division independents football records
| | Conf. | | | Overall |
| Team | W | L | T | W | | L | | T |
|---|---|---|---|---|---|---|---|---|
| East Carolina | | – | | 9 | – | 1 | – | 0 |
| Abilene Christian | | – | | 8 | – | 1 | – | 0 |
| Northeastern | | – | | 8 | – | 1 | – | 0 |
| Wheaton (IL) | | – | | 8 | – | 1 | – | 0 |
| Mississippi Vocational | | – | | 6 | – | 3 | – | 0 |
| Santa Clara | | – | | 6 | – | 3 | – | 0 |
| St. Norbert | | – | | 6 | – | 3 | – | 0 |
| Arizona State–Flagstaff | | – | | 5 | – | 3 | – | 1 |
| Howard (AL) | | – | | 5 | – | 3 | – | 1 |
| Cortland | | – | | 4 | – | 3 | – | 0 |
| Lamar Tech | | – | | 5 | – | 4 | – | 0 |
| Parsons | | – | | 5 | – | 4 | – | 0 |
| Drake | | – | | 4 | – | 4 | – | 0 |
| Hawaii | | – | | 5 | – | 5 | – | 0 |
| Northern Michigan | | – | | 4 | – | 4 | – | 1 |
| Southern Connecticut State | | – | | 4 | – | 4 | – | 0 |
| Wabash | | – | | 4 | – | 4 | – | 1 |
| Tampa | | – | | 4 | – | 5 | – | 1 |
| Southern Illinois | | – | | 4 | – | 5 | – | 0 |
| UC Riverside | | – | | 4 | – | 5 | – | 0 |
| UC Santa Barbara | | – | | 4 | – | 5 | – | 0 |
| Chattanooga | | – | | 4 | – | 6 | – | 0 |
| Lake Forest | | – | | 2 | – | 4 | – | 1 |
| Hardin–Simmons | | – | | 2 | – | 6 | – | 1 |
| Arkansas State | | – | | 2 | – | 6 | – | 0 |
| Eastern Michigan | | – | | 2 | – | 6 | – | 0 |
| Rose Poly | | – | | 2 | – | 6 | – | 0 |
| Union (NY) | | – | | 2 | – | 6 | – | 0 |
| Cal Poly Pomona | | – | | 2 | – | 7 | – | 0 |
| Trinity (TX) | | – | | 1 | – | 6 | – | 1 |
| Carnegie Tech | | – | | 1 | – | 6 | – | 0 |
| Arlington State | | – | | 1 | – | 8 | – | 0 |

The 1963 Hardin–Simmons Cowboys football team was an American football team that represented Hardin–Simmons University as an independent during the 1963 NCAA College Division football season. In its first and only season under head coach Floyd Huggins, the team compiled a 2–6–1 record. The Cowboys game against Arlington State scheduled for November 23 at Memorial Stadium was canceled in deference to the assassination of John F. Kennedy which occurred the previous day at Dallas.

From 1960 to 1963, the Hardin–Simmons football program compiled a combined record of 3–35–1 and was outscored by a total of 999 to 313. In January 1964, the university trustees ordered the elimination of the university football program. The chairman of the board said the move was necessitated by "financial difficulties and losses" in the athletic program. The school did not field another football team for 27 years.

== Schedule ==
| Date | Opponent | Site | Result | Attendance | Source |
|---|---|---|---|---|---|
| September 21 | at Stephen F. Austin | Memorial Stadium; Nacogdoches, TX | W 16–6 | 5,000 | |
| September 28 | at Southwestern Louisiana | McNaspy Stadium; Lafayette, LA | L 6–16 | 8,000–8,500 | |
| October 5 | Abilene Christian | Shotwell Stadium; Abilene, TX | L 7–21 | 11,000 | |
| October 12 | at Wichita | Veterans Field; Wichita, KS | L 12–26 | 15,720 | |
| October 26 | at New Mexico State | Memorial Stadium; Las Cruces, NM | W 41–6 | 8,000 | |
| November 2 | at McMurry | Shotwell Stadium; Abilene, TX | L 7–21 | 5,000 | |
| November 9 | at Trinity (TX) | Alamo Stadium; San Antonio, TX | T 0–0 | 1,104 | |
| November 16 | at North Texas State | Fouts Field; Denton, TX | L 12–18 | 1,500–3,000 | |
| November 23 | Arlington State | Memorial Stadium; Arlington, TX | Cancelled | | |
| November 30 | Howard Payne | Shotwell Stadium; Abilene, TX | L 7–16 | 2,400 | |
