= 1963 Northeastern State Redmen football team =

American college football season

1963 Northeastern State Redmen football

OCC champion, All Sports Bowl champion

All Sports Bowl, W 59–12 vs. Slippery Rock
- Conference: Oklahoma Collegiate Conference
- Record: 11–0 (7–0 OCC)
- Head coach: Tracy Norwood (2nd season)
- Home stadium: Gable Field

1963 Oklahoma Collegiate Conference football standings
	Conf.					Overall
Team	W		L		T	W		L		T
No. 4 Northeastern State $	7	–	0	–	0	11	–	0	–	0
East Central	5	–	1	–	1	8	–	1	–	1
Panhandle A&M	4	–	2	–	1	7	–	2	–	1
Central State (OK)	3	–	3	–	1	4	–	4	–	1
NW Oklahoma State	2	–	3	–	2	4	–	4	–	2
Langston	2	–	5	–	0	3	–	7	–	0
SE Oklahoma State	1	–	5	–	1	1	–	7	–	2
SW Oklahoma State	1	–	6	–	0	3	–	7	–	0
$ – Conference champion; Rankings from NAIA poll

The 1963 Northeastern State Redmen football team was an American football team that represented Northeastern State University of Tahlequah, Oklahoma, as a member of the Oklahoma Collegiate Conference (OCC) during the 1963 NAIA football season. In their second year under head coach Tracy Norwood, the Redmen compiled a perfect 11–0 record (7–0 in conference games), won the OIC championship, defeated Slippery Rock in the All Sports Bowl, and outscored opponents by a total of 277 to 74. Northeastern State was ranked No. 4 in the final National Association of Intercollegiate Athletics (NAIA) poll.

Seven Northeastern players were selected as first-team players on the 1963 All-OCc football team: junior fullback Dan Jordan; junior center Jerry Panter; junior offensive tackle David Southard; junior offensive end Bob Wilmoth; sophomore defensive end Bill Scott; senior defensive tackle Bill Van Cleave; and senior corner linebacker Danny Cole.

The team played its home games on Gable Field in Tahlequah.

== Schedule ==
Date	Opponent	Site	Result	Attendance	Source
September 14	Arkansas Tech*	Gable Field; Tahlequah, OK	W 12–7		
September 21	Northwestern Oklahoma State	Gable Field; Tahlequah, OK	W 20–14		
September 28	at Southeastern Oklahoma State	Durant, OK	W 33–7		
October 5	East Central^{†}	Gable Field; Tahlequah, OK	W 22–14	5,000	
October 12	at Southwestern Oklahoma State	Weatherford, OK	W 7–0		
October 19	at Langston	Guthrie, OK	W 28–6		
October 26	Central State (OK)	Gable Field; Tahlequah, OK	W 14–7		
November 2	at Panhandle A&M	Goodwell, OK	W 7–0		
November 16	Central Missouri State*	Gable Field; Tahlequah, OK	W 62–0		
November 23	at Southeast Missouri State*	Cape Girardeau, MO	W 13–7		
December 7	vs. Slippery Rock*	Taft Stadium; Oklahoma City, OK (All Sports Bowl)	W 59–12	8,500	
*Non-conference game; ^{†}Homecoming
