= 1963 NCAA College Division football season =

American college football season

- Champion(s): Northern Illinois (AP); Delaware (UPI); Prairie View A&M (black)

The 1963 NCAA College Division football season was played by American football teams representing 299 colleges and universities recognized the National Collegiate Athletic Association (NCAA) as minor programs. The remaining 120 colleges and universities that were NCAA members and fielded football teams competed in the 1963 NCAA University Division football season.

== Conference standings ==
1963 Big Sky Conference football standings
	Conf.					Overall
Team	W		L		T	W		L		T
Idaho State $	3	–	1	–	0	5	–	3	–	0
Montana State	2	–	1	–	0	6	–	3	–	0
Weber State	1	–	2	–	0	6	–	3	–	0
Montana	0	–	3	–	0	1	–	9	–	0
Idaho *	1	–	0	–	0	5	–	4	–	0
$ – Conference champion; * – Insufficient number of games for conference championship

1963 California Collegiate Athletic Association football standings
	Conf.					Overall
Team	W		L		T	W		L		T
Los Angeles State $	3	–	1	–	0	7	–	1	–	0
No. 7 San Diego State	3	–	1	–	0	7	–	2	–	0
Long Beach State	2	–	2	–	0	5	–	5	–	0
Fresno State	2	–	2	–	0	4	–	6	–	0
Cal Poly	0	–	4	–	0	2	–	8	–	0
Valley State	0	–	0	–	0	2	–	6	–	0
$ – Conference champion; Los Angeles State was the conference championship by virtue of its head to head win over San Diego State. Games with Valley State did not count in the conference standings.; Rankings from UPI small college poll

1963 Central Intercollegiate Athletic Association football standings
	Conf.					Overall
Team	W		L		T	W		L		T
No. 17 North Carolina College $	6	–	1	–	0	8	–	1	–	0
No. 14 Morgan State	8	–	1	–	0	8	–	1	–	0
North Carolina A&T	5	–	2	–	0	7	–	3	–	0
Johnson C. Smith	5	–	1	–	0	7	–	2	–	0
Virginia Union	7	–	2	–	0	7	–	2	–	0
St. Augustine's	4	–	2	–	1	4	–	3	–	1
Virginia State	4	–	4	–	0	4	–	4	–	1
Saint Paul's (VA)	4	–	3	–	0	4	–	3	–	1
Winston-Salem State	3	–	3	–	1	4	–	3	–	1
Norfolk State	4	–	3	–	0	4	–	4	–	0
Maryland State	3	–	4	–	0	4	–	4	–	0
Elizabeth City State	3	–	5	–	0	3	–	5	–	0
Hampton	2	–	5	–	0	4	–	5	–	0
Shaw	2	–	6	–	0	2	–	8	–	0
Howard	1	–	4	–	0	4	–	5	–	0
Fayetteville State	1	–	5	–	0	1	–	7	–	0
Delaware State	1	–	5	–	0	2	–	5	–	1
Livingstone	0	–	7	–	0	0	–	7	–	0
$ – Conference champion; Rankings from NAIA poll

1963 Central Intercollegiate Conference football standings
	Conf.					Overall
Team	W		L		T	W		L		T
Omaha $	4	–	0	–	0	7	–	2	–	0
Pittsburg State	2	–	1	–	1	5	–	3	–	1
Washburn *	2	–	2	–	0	3	–	6	–	0
Fort Hays State	1	–	3	–	0	2	–	6	–	1
Emporia State	0	–	3	–	1	2	–	5	–	2
$ – Conference champion; * — Washburn forfeited two non-conference wins

1963 College Athletic Conference football standings
	Conf.					Overall
Team	W		L		T	W		L		T
Sewanee $	4	–	0	–	0	8	–	0	–	0
Washington and Lee	2	–	1	–	0	5	–	3	–	0
Washington University	1	–	1	–	0	6	–	2	–	1
Centre	1	–	2	–	0	3	–	5	–	0
Southwestern (TN)	0	–	4	–	0	2	–	5	–	1
$ – Conference champion

1963 College Conference of Illinois football standings
	Conf.					Overall
Team	W		L		T	W		L		T
Carthage $	4	–	1	–	1	6	–	1	–	1
Augustana (IL)	4	–	2	–	0	7	–	2	–	0
Illinois Wesleyan	4	–	2	–	0	6	–	3	–	0
Millikin	3	–	2	–	1	4	–	3	–	1
Carroll (WI)	3	–	3	–	0	5	–	4	–	0
North Central (IL)	2	–	4	–	0	2	–	6	–	0
North Park	0	–	6	–	0	1	–	7	–	0
$ – Conference champion

1963 Far Western Conference football standings
	Conf.					Overall
Team	W		L		T	W		L		T
Humboldt State +	3	–	1	–	1	6	–	1	–	2
San Francisco State +	3	–	1	–	1	6	–	2	–	1
UC Davis +	3	–	1	–	1	6	–	2	–	1
Sacramento State	2	–	2	–	1	6	–	2	–	1
Nevada	2	–	3	–	0	3	–	6	–	0
Chico State	0	–	5	–	0	2	–	7	–	0
+ – Conference co-champions

1963 Great Plains College Association football standings
	Conf.					Overall
Team	W		L		T	W		L		T
Nebraska Wesleyan $	3	–	0	–	0	7	–	2	–	0
Hastings	2	–	1	–	0	5	–	3	–	1
Colorado College	1	–	2	–	0	4	–	6	–	0
Doane	0	–	3	–	0	3	–	6	–	0
$ – Conference champion

1963 Gulf States Conference football standings
	Conf.					Overall
Team	W		L		T	W		L		T
McNeese State $	5	–	0	–	0	8	–	0	–	0
Louisiana Tech	3	–	2	–	0	6	–	3	–	0
Southeastern Louisiana	3	–	2	–	0	4	–	4	–	1
Northwestern State	2	–	3	–	0	4	–	6	–	0
Southwestern Louisiana	1	–	4	–	0	4	–	5	–	0
Northeast Louisiana State	1	–	4	–	0	4	–	6	–	0
$ – Conference champion

1963 Hoosier Conference football standings
	Conf.					Overall
Team	W		L		T	W		L		T
Taylor $	4	–	0	–	1	5	–	2	–	1
Franklin (IN)	3	–	2	–	0	6	–	3	–	0
Manchester (IN)	3	–	2	–	0	4	–	4	–	0
Anderson (IN)	2	–	2	–	1	2	–	5	–	1
Indiana Central	2	–	3	–	0	3	–	6	–	0
Hanover	0	–	5	–	0	0	–	9	–	0
$ – Conference champion

1963 Indiana Collegiate Conference football standings
	Conf.					Overall
Team	W		L		T	W		L		T
Butler $	6	–	0	–	0	8	–	1	–	0
Ball State	4	–	2	–	0	5	–	3	–	0
DePauw	3	–	3	–	0	4	–	4	–	0
Valparaiso	3	–	3	–	0	3	–	5	–	0
Indiana State	2	–	4	–	0	4	–	4	–	0
Evansville	2	–	4	–	0	2	–	6	–	0
Saint Joseph's (IN)	1	–	5	–	0	2	–	7	–	0
$ – Conference champion

1963 Interstate Intercollegiate Athletic Conference football standings
	Conf.					Overall
Team	W		L		T	W		L		T
No. 1 Northern Illinois $	4	–	0	–	0	10	–	0	–	0
Western Illinois	3	–	1	–	0	6	–	3	–	0
Central Michigan	2	–	2	–	0	4	–	5	–	1
Eastern Illinois	1	–	3	–	0	2	–	7	–	0
Illinois State Normal	0	–	4	–	0	3	–	6	–	0
$ – Conference champion; Rankings from NAIA poll

1963 Iowa Conference football standings
	Conf.					Overall
Team	W		L		T	W		L		T
Luther $	8	–	0	–	0	9	–	0	–	0
Central (IA)	6	–	1	–	1	7	–	1	–	1
Upper Iowa	5	–	3	–	0	6	–	3	–	0
Simpson (IA)	5	–	3	–	0	5	–	4	–	0
Dubuque	3	–	4	–	1	3	–	4	–	1
Buena Vista	3	–	5	–	0	4	–	5	–	0
Wartburg	3	–	5	–	0	3	–	5	–	0
Iowa Wesleyan	2	–	6	–	0	2	–	7	–	0
William Penn	0	–	8	–	0	0	–	9	–	0
$ – Conference champion

1963 Lone Star Conference football standings
	Conf.					Overall
Team	W		L		T	W		L		T
No. 7 Southwest Texas State $	6	–	0	–	0	10	–	0	–	0
East Texas State	4	–	2	–	0	7	–	2	–	1
Stephen F. Austin	4	–	2	–	0	7	–	3	–	0
Texas A&I	3	–	3	–	0	5	–	4	–	0
Sam Houston State	2	–	3	–	1	4	–	3	–	1
Howard Payne	1	–	5	–	0	3	–	7	–	0
Sul Ross	0	–	5	–	1	1	–	7	–	1
$ – Conference champion; Rankings from NAIA poll

1963 Mason–Dixon Conference football standings
	Conf.					Overall
Team	W		L		T	W		L		T
Western Maryland $	2	–	0	–	1	6	–	1	–	1
Hampden–Sydney	2	–	1	–	0	6	–	2	–	0
Bridgewater	2	–	1	–	1	2	–	4	–	1
Randolph–Macon	1	–	3	–	0	3	–	6	–	0
Johns Hopkins	0	–	1	–	0	0	–	6	–	1
Gallaudet	0	–	1	–	0	0	–	8	–	0
$ – Conference champion

1963 Michigan Intercollegiate Athletic Association football standings
	Conf.					Overall
Team	W		L		T	W		L		T
Kalamazoo +	4	–	1	–	0	6	–	2	–	0
Hope +	4	–	1	–	0	5	–	4	–	0
Albion	3	–	2	–	0	5	–	4	–	0
Adrian	3	–	2	–	0	4	–	4	–	0
Alma	1	–	4	–	0	2	–	7	–	0
Olivet	0	–	5	–	0	1	–	8	–	0
+ – Conference co-champions; Albion forfeited a win over Adrian.

1963 Mid-Ohio Conference football standings
	Conf.					Overall
Team	W		L		T	W		L		T
Ashland $	3	–	0	–	0	9	–	1	–	0
Bluffton	2	–	1	–	0	7	–	2	–	0
Defiance	1	–	3	–	0	2	–	6	–	0
Wilmington (OH)	1	–	3	–	0	3	–	5	–	0
$ – Conference champion

1963 Middle Atlantic Conference football standings
	Conf.					Overall
Team	W		L		T	W		L		T
University Division
No. 2 Delaware x	4	–	0	–	0	8	–	0	–	0
Bucknell	3	–	1	–	0	6	–	3	–	0
Gettysburg	2	–	2	–	0	5	–	4	–	0
Temple	1	–	2	–	0	5	–	3	–	1
Lehigh	1	–	3	–	0	1	–	8	–	0
Lafayette	1	–	4	–	0	1	–	8	–	0
Northern College Division
Upsala x	4	–	1	–	0	6	–	2	–	0
Wagner	4	–	1	–	0	6	–	3	–	0
Albright	2	–	3	–	0	3	–	5	–	0
Moravian	2	–	4	–	0	2	–	4	–	0
Wilkes	2	–	5	–	0	3	–	5	–	0
Lycoming	1	–	5	–	0	1	–	7	–	0
Juniata *	3	–	1	–	0	5	–	3	–	0
Susquehanna *	2	–	1	–	0	8	–	1	–	0
Hofstra *	0	–	0	–	0	3	–	6	–	0
Southern College Division
Western Maryland x	4	–	0	–	0	6	–	1	–	1
Muhlenberg	4	–	1	–	0	5	–	3	–	0
Dickinson	5	–	2	–	0	5	–	2	–	0
Swarthmore	4	–	2	–	0	4	–	3	–	0
Drexel	3	–	2	–	0	5	–	3	–	0
Lebanon Valley	4	–	3	–	0	4	–	3	–	0
Pennsylvania Military	3	–	5	–	0	3	–	6	–	0
Ursinus	2	–	4	–	1	2	–	4	–	1
Haverford	2	–	4	–	0	2	–	5	–	0
Franklin & Marshall	1	–	4	–	0	1	–	6	–	0
Johns Hopkins	0	–	4	–	1	0	–	6	–	1
West Chester *	0	–	0	–	0	7	–	1	–	0
x – Division champion/co-champions; * – Ineligible for championship due to insufficient conference games; Rankings from AP Poll

1963 Midwest Athletic Association football standings
	Conf.					Overall
Team	W		L		T	W		L		T
No. 11 Tennessee A&I $	3	–	0	–	0	6	–	3	–	0
Lincoln (MO)	2	–	1	–	0	5	–	5	–	0
Kentucky State	1	–	2	–	0	5	–	4	–	0
Central State (OH)	0	–	3	–	0	4	–	5	–	0
$ – Conference champion; Rankings from Pittsburgh Courier

1963 Midwest Conference football standings
	Conf.					Overall
Team	W		L		T	W		L		T
Ripon $	8	–	0	–	0	8	–	0	–	0
Carleton	5	–	2	–	1	5	–	2	–	1
Cornell (IA)	5	–	3	–	0	5	–	3	–	0
Grinnell	5	–	3	–	0	5	–	3	–	0
Beloit	3	–	3	–	2	3	–	3	–	2
Coe	4	–	4	–	0	4	–	4	–	0
St. Olaf	4	–	4	–	0	4	–	4	–	0
Lawrence	3	–	4	–	1	3	–	4	–	1
Knox	1	–	7	–	0	1	–	7	–	0
Monmouth (IL)	0	–	8	–	0	0	–	8	–	0
$ – Conference champion

1963 Minnesota Intercollegiate Athletic Conference football standings
	Conf.					Overall
Team	W		L		T	W		L		T
No. 2 Saint John's (MN) $^	7	–	0	–	0	10	–	0	–	0
Concordia (MN)	6	–	1	–	0	7	–	2	–	0
Augsburg	4	–	3	–	0	4	–	3	–	1
Hamline	3	–	4	–	0	4	–	4	–	1
Gustavus Adolphus	3	–	4	–	0	4	–	5	–	0
St. Thomas (MN)	3	–	4	–	0	4	–	5	–	0
Minnesota–Duluth	2	–	5	–	0	3	–	6	–	0
Macalester	0	–	7	–	0	1	–	8	–	0
$ – Conference champion; ^ – NAIA playoff participant; Rankings from NAIA poll

1963 Missouri Intercollegiate Athletic Association football standings
	Conf.					Overall
Team	W		L		T	W		L		T
SW Missouri State $	5	–	0	–	0	9	–	1	–	0
NE Missouri State	4	–	1	–	0	7	–	3	–	0
SE Missouri State	2	–	3	–	0	4	–	6	–	0
Missouri–Rolla	2	–	3	–	0	2	–	7	–	0
NW Missouri State	1	–	4	–	0	3	–	5	–	1
Central Missouri State	1	–	4	–	0	1	–	8	–	0
$ – Conference champion

1963 North Central Conference football standings
	Conf.					Overall
Team	W		L		T	W		L		T
South Dakota State $	6	–	0	–	0	9	–	1	–	0
North Dakota	4	–	2	–	0	6	–	3	–	0
State College of Iowa	4	–	2	–	0	5	–	3	–	1
North Dakota State	3	–	3	–	0	3	–	5	–	0
Augustana (SD)	2	–	4	–	0	2	–	8	–	0
Morningside	1	–	5	–	0	3	–	5	–	0
South Dakota	1	–	5	–	0	1	–	7	–	0
$ – Conference champion

1963 Northern Intercollegiate Conference football standings
	Conf.					Overall
Team	W		L		T	W		L		T
Michigan Tech $	4	–	1	–	0	6	–	2	–	0
Bemidji State	3	–	1	–	1	6	–	1	–	1
St. Cloud State	3	–	2	–	0	6	–	3	–	0
Mankato State	3	–	2	–	0	4	–	4	–	1
Moorhead State	1	–	3	–	1	4	–	4	–	1
Winona State	0	–	5	–	0	1	–	7	–	0
$ – Conference champion

1963 Ohio Athletic Conference football standings
	Conf.					Overall
Team	W		L		T	W		L		T
No. 3 Wittenberg $	6	–	0	–	1	8	–	0	–	1
Denison	5	–	1	–	0	8	–	1	–	0
Oberlin	5	–	1	–	0	6	–	2	–	0
Muskingum	6	–	2	–	0	6	–	3	–	0
Akron	5	–	2	–	0	6	–	3	–	0
Otterbein	4	–	2	–	1	5	–	3	–	1
Baldwin–Wallace	3	–	2	–	0	6	–	3	–	0
Marietta	4	–	3	–	0	5	–	4	–	0
Hiram	2	–	3	–	0	3	–	5	–	0
Kenyon	2	–	4	–	0	2	–	6	–	0
Capital	2	–	6	–	0	2	–	6	–	0
Heidelberg	1	–	5	–	1	1	–	7	–	1
Mount Union	1	–	5	–	0	1	–	8	–	0
Wooster	1	–	6	–	0	1	–	8	–	0
Ohio Wesleyan	0	–	5	–	1	2	–	6	–	1
$ – Conference champion; Rankings from AP small college poll

1963 Ohio Valley Conference football standings
	Conf.					Overall
Team	W		L		T	W		L		T
No. 8 Western Kentucky $	7	–	0	–	0	10	–	0	–	1
Middle Tennessee	6	–	1	–	0	8	–	2	–	0
East Tennessee State	5	–	2	–	0	7	–	2	–	0
Tennessee Tech	3	–	4	–	0	6	–	4	–	0
Murray State	3	–	4	–	0	5	–	5	–	0
Morehead State	3	–	4	–	0	5	–	4	–	0
Eastern Kentucky	1	–	6	–	0	2	–	8	–	0
Austin Peay	0	–	7	–	0	1	–	9	–	0
$ – Conference champion; Rankings from UPI small college poll

1963 Pennsylvania State College Conference football standings
	Conf.					Overall
Team	W		L		T	W		L		T
East Division
West Chester xy$	6	–	0	–	0	8	–	1	–	0
East Stroudsburg	4	–	2	–	0	5	–	3	–	0
Millersville	4	–	2	–	0	5	–	3	–	0
Mansfield	3	–	3	–	0	4	–	4	–	0
Bloomsburg	2	–	4	–	0	3	–	5	–	0
Kutztown	2	–	4	–	0	3	–	5	–	0
Cheyney	0	–	6	–	0	1	–	6	–	0
West Division
Slippery Rock xy	6	–	0	–	0	6	–	3	–	1
No. 19 Indiana (PA)	5	–	1	–	0	7	–	1	–	1
California (PA)	4	–	2	–	0	5	–	2	–	0
Shippensburg	3	–	3	–	0	3	–	5	–	0
Clarion	2	–	4	–	0	4	–	4	–	0
Edinboro	1	–	5	–	0	2	–	6	–	0
Lock Haven	0	–	6	–	0	2	–	6	–	0
Championship: West Chester 36, Slippery Rock 7
$ – Conference champion; x – Division champion/co-champions; y – Championship game participant; Rankings from NAIA poll

1963 Prairie College Conference football standings
	Conf.					Overall
Team	W		L		T	W		L		T
Principia $	2	–	0	–	0	6	–	2	–	1
Illinois College	1	–	1	–	0	4	–	3	–	0
Rose Poly	0	–	2	–	0	2	–	6	–	0
$ – Conference champion

1963 Presidents' Athletic Conference football standings
	Conf.					Overall
Team	W		L		T	W		L		T
John Carroll $	6	–	0	–	0	7	–	0	–	0
Washington & Jefferson	4	–	2	–	0	5	–	2	–	0
Thiel	4	–	2	–	1	4	–	2	–	1
Wayne State (MI)	3	–	3	–	0	3	–	4	–	0
Allegheny	2	–	3	–	0	4	–	3	–	0
Bethany (WV)	2	–	5	–	0	2	–	5	–	0
Case Tech	2	–	5	–	0	2	–	5	–	0
Western Reserve	1	–	4	–	1	1	–	5	–	1
$ – Conference champion

1963 Rocky Mountain Conference football standings
	Conf.					Overall
Team	W		L		T	W		L		T
Western State (CO) $	4	–	0	–	0	8	–	1	–	0
Adams State	3	–	1	–	0	6	–	4	–	0
Colorado State–Greeley	2	–	2	–	0	4	–	5	–	0
Colorado Mines	1	–	3	–	0	6	–	3	–	0
Colorado College	0	–	4	–	0	4	–	6	–	0
$ – Conference champion

1963 Southern California Intercollegiate Athletic Conference football standings
	Conf.					Overall
Team	W		L		T	W		L		T
Whittier +	2	–	1	–	0	6	–	2	–	1
Occidental +	2	–	1	–	0	6	–	3	–	0
Pomona	1	–	2	–	0	5	–	3	–	1
Redlands	1	–	2	–	0	4	–	6	–	0
+ – Conference co-champions

1963 Southwestern Athletic Conference football standings
	Conf.					Overall
Team	W		L		T	W		L		T
No. 5 Prairie View A&M $^	7	–	0	–	0	10	–	1	–	0
Southern	5	–	2	–	0	7	–	3	–	0
Texas Southern	5	–	2	–	0	7	–	3	–	0
Grambling	3	–	3	–	1	5	–	3	–	1
Arkansas AM&N	3	–	3	–	1	5	–	4	–	1
Jackson State	2	–	5	–	0	4	–	5	–	0
Wiley	2	–	5	–	0	4	–	5	–	0
Alcorn A&M	0	–	7	–	0	3	–	7	–	0
$ – Conference champion; ^ – NAIA playoff participant; Rankings from NAIA poll

1963 Virginia Little Eight Conference football standings
	Conf.					Overall
Team	W		L		T	W		L		T
Hampden–Sydney $	2	–	0	–	0	6	–	3	–	0
Bridgewater	1	–	1	–	0	2	–	4	–	1
Emory and Henry	0	–	0	–	0	8	–	2	–	1
Randolph–Macon	0	–	2	–	0	3	–	6	–	0
$ – Conference champion

1963 Wisconsin State College Conference football standings
	Conf.					Overall
Team	W		L		T	W		L		T
No. 13 Eau Claire State $	6	–	0	–	0	7	–	0	–	0
Stevens Point State	6	–	1	–	0	6	–	2	–	0
Whitewater State	5	–	2	–	0	6	–	3	–	0
Superior State	4	–	2	–	0	5	–	4	–	0
Platteville State	3	–	3	–	0	3	–	5	–	0
River Falls State	3	–	3	–	1	4	–	3	–	2
Stout State	2	–	4	–	1	2	–	5	–	1
Milwaukee	1	–	4	–	1	1	–	6	–	1
Oshkosh State	0	–	5	–	2	0	–	5	–	2
La Crosse State	0	–	6	–	1	0	–	8	–	1
$ – Conference champion; Rankings from NAIA poll

1963 Yankee Conference football standings
	Conf.					Overall
Team	W		L		T	W		L		T
UMass $	5	–	0	–	0	8	–	0	–	1
Maine	3	–	2	–	0	5	–	3	–	0
Rhode Island	2	–	3	–	0	4	–	5	–	0
Vermont	2	–	2	–	0	6	–	2	–	0
Connecticut	1	–	3	–	0	2	–	6	–	0
New Hampshire	1	–	4	–	0	2	–	6	–	0
$ – Conference champion

1963 NCAA College Division independents football records
	Conf.			Overall
Team	W	L	T	W		L		T
East Carolina		–		9	–	1	–	0
Abilene Christian		–		8	–	1	–	0
Northeastern		–		8	–	1	–	0
Mississippi Vocational		–		6	–	3	–	0
Santa Clara		–		6	–	3	–	0
St. Norbert		–		6	–	3	–	0
Arizona State–Flagstaff		–		5	–	3	–	1
Howard (AL)		–		5	–	3	–	1
Cortland		–		4	–	3	–	0
Lamar Tech		–		5	–	4	–	0
Parsons		–		5	–	4	–	0
Drake		–		4	–	4	–	0
Hawaii		–		5	–	5	–	0
Northern Michigan		–		4	–	4	–	1
Southern Connecticut State		–		4	–	4	–	0
Wabash		–		4	–	4	–	1
Tampa		–		4	–	5	–	1
Southern Illinois		–		4	–	5	–	0
UC Riverside		–		4	–	5	–	0
UC Santa Barbara		–		4	–	5	–	0
Chattanooga		–		4	–	6	–	0
Lake Forest		–		2	–	4	–	1
Hardin–Simmons		–		2	–	6	–	1
Arkansas State		–		2	–	6	–	0
Eastern Michigan		–		2	–	6	–	0
Rose Poly		–		2	–	6	–	0
Union (NY)		–		2	–	6	–	0
Cal Poly Pomona		–		2	–	7	–	0
Trinity (TX)		–		1	–	6	–	1
Carnegie Tech		–		1	–	6	–	0
Arlington State		–		1	–	8	–	0

== Rankings ==
=== Small college poll ===
In 1963, both United Press International (UPI) and the Associated Press (AP) conducted "small college" polls, and selected different number one teams. UPI's panel of coaches selected Delaware, who had a record of 8–0 and had outscored their opponents 290–76 while winning all their games by at least 9 points. The AP's panel of sportswriters selected Northern Illinois, who finished the regular season at 9–0 including three shutouts. The Huskies went on to defeat Southwest Missouri State in the Mineral Water Bowl, 21–14.

After the season ended, the NCAA announced plans to play "four postseason regional games" in 1964. These were played from 1964 through 1972. However, not until 1973, when the NCAA College Division was reorganized as NCAA Division II and NCAA Division III, did these postseason games to determine a national champion.

Associated Press (writers) final poll
Published on November 29

Rank	School	Record	No. 1 votes	Total points
1	Northern Illinois	9–0†	3	63
2	Delaware	8–0	3	53
3	Wittenberg	8–0–1		38
4	UMass	7–0–1^{note1}		37
5	Saint John's (MN)	8–0†		35
6	South Dakota State	9–1		33
7	Florida A&M	7–1†		24
8	Abilene Christian	7–1		18
9	Southwest Texas State	10–0	1	10
10	McNeese State	8–0		9

†Denotes team played a game after UPI poll, hence record differs in AP poll
^note1 UMass was actually 8–0–1 when the poll was taken.

United Press International (coaches) final poll
Published on December 4

Rank	School	Record	No. 1 votes	Total points
1	Delaware	8–0	18	309
2	Northern Illinois	10–0	8	286
3	UMass	8–0–1	1	160
4	Saint John's (MN)	9–0	1	158
5	Wittenberg	8–0–1		153
6	Florida A&M	8–2^{note2}	1	141
7	San Diego State	7–2	1	101
8	Western Kentucky	8–0–1	2	78
9	Northeastern State	10–0		57
10	Southwest Missouri State	9–1		55

^note2 Florida A&M actually 7–2 when the poll was taken.

== See also ==
- 1963 NCAA University Division football season
- 1963 NAIA football season
