= 1963 East Carolina Pirates football team =

American college football season

1963 East Carolina Pirates football

Eastern Bowl champion

Eastern Bowl, W 27–6 vs Northeastern
- Conference: Independent
- Record: 9–1
- Head coach: Clarence Stasavich (2nd season)
- Home stadium: Ficklen Memorial Stadium

1963 NCAA College Division independents football records
	Conf.			Overall
Team	W	L	T	W		L		T
East Carolina		–		9	–	1	–	0
Abilene Christian		–		8	–	1	–	0
Northeastern		–		8	–	1	–	0
Wheaton (IL)		–		8	–	1	–	0
Mississippi Vocational		–		6	–	3	–	0
Santa Clara		–		6	–	3	–	0
St. Norbert		–		6	–	3	–	0
Arizona State–Flagstaff		–		5	–	3	–	1
Howard (AL)		–		5	–	3	–	1
Cortland		–		4	–	3	–	0
Lamar Tech		–		5	–	4	–	0
Parsons		–		5	–	4	–	0
Drake		–		4	–	4	–	0
Hawaii		–		5	–	5	–	0
Northern Michigan		–		4	–	4	–	1
Southern Connecticut State		–		4	–	4	–	0
Wabash		–		4	–	4	–	1
Tampa		–		4	–	5	–	1
Southern Illinois		–		4	–	5	–	0
UC Riverside		–		4	–	5	–	0
UC Santa Barbara		–		4	–	5	–	0
Chattanooga		–		4	–	6	–	0
Lake Forest		–		2	–	4	–	1
Hardin–Simmons		–		2	–	6	–	1
Arkansas State		–		2	–	6	–	0
Eastern Michigan		–		2	–	6	–	0
Rose Poly		–		2	–	6	–	0
Union (NY)		–		2	–	6	–	0
Cal Poly Pomona		–		2	–	7	–	0
Trinity (TX)		–		1	–	6	–	1
Carnegie Tech		–		1	–	6	–	0
Arlington State		–		1	–	8	–	0

The 1963 East Carolina Pirates football team was an American football team that represented East Carolina College (now known as East Carolina University) as an independent during the 1963 NCAA College Division football season. In their second season under head coach Clarence Stasavich, the team compiled a 9–1 record.

== Schedule ==
Date	Opponent	Site	Result	Attendance	Source
September 14	at Richmond	City Stadium; Richmond, VA	L 7–10	7,000	
September 21	Wake Forest	Ficklen Memorial Stadium; Greenville, NC	W 20–10	17,000	
September 28	Wofford	Ficklen Memorial Stadium; Greenville, NC	W 34–7	3,500	
October 5	at Presbyterian	Old Bailey Stadium; Clinton, SC	W 24–7	4,500	
October 12	Elon	Ficklen Memorial Stadium; Greenville, NC	W 6–0	9,000	
October 19	Western Carolina	Ficklen Memorial Stadium; Greenville, NC	W 50–0	11,500	
November 2	at The Citadel	Johnson Hagood Stadium; Charleston, SC	W 20–6	7,500	
November 9	Lenoir Rhyne	Ficklen Memorial Stadium; Greenville, NC	W 28–0	10,500	
November 23	at Tampa	Phillips Field; Tampa, FL	W 14–8	6,500	
December 14	vs. Northeastern	J. Birney Crum Stadium; Allentown, PA (Eastern Bowl)	W 27–6	2,800	
