= James Monroe High School (California) =

Location
- 9229 Haskell Avenue; North Hills, California 91343; United States; 34.2384°N 118.4770°W

Information
- Type: Public high school
- Motto: "Home of the Vikings"
- Established: July 1, 1958
- School district: Los Angeles Unified School District
- Principal: Mathew Diamond
- Teaching staff: 115.39 (FTE)
- Grades: 9-12
- Enrollment: 1,944 (2023-2024)
- Student to teacher ratio: 16.85
- Student Union/Association: Associated Student Body (ASB)
- Colors: Red; White; Columbia Blue
- Athletics conference: East Valley League; CIF Los Angeles City Section
- Mascot: Vik The Viking
- Nickname: Vikings
- Accreditation: Western Association of Schools and Colleges (WASC)
- National ranking: 9,250
- Newspaper: The Vanguard
- Website: Official website

James Monroe High School (JMHS), at 9229 Haskell Avenue in North Hills, California, is a public high school in the Los Angeles Unified School District. It is home to Small Learning Communities (SLCs) and three magnet schools. Its mascot is the Viking.

== History ==
The school opened in the fall of 1958.

The team name Vikings was selected by a student leadership class, as were the school colors and song. The Multipurpose room was named Odin's Hall, and the Annual was named "Valhalla".

It was in the Los Angeles City High School District until 1961, when it merged into LAUSD.

In 2004, five drop-out students including future rapper Hopsin were arrested for vandalizing James Monroe High School property, which was intended to be a school prank. They were later all charged and held on $20,000 bail.

The opening of Panorama High School in October 2006 relieved overcrowding at JMHS.

In 2010, it was ranked 420 in Newsweek's list of U.S. high schools.

== Smaller Learning Communities (SLCs) ==
- 9th Grade Academy
- ARMY JROTC program called the Viking Battalion
- Arts, Media, & Entertainment
- Engineering & Design (including the Monroe SAS)
- Magnet (Law & Government, Police Academy and Fire Academy)

== School for Advanced Studies (SAS) ==
The Monroe School for Advanced Studies, formed in 2001, belongs to the larger SLC of Engineering & Design.

== Athletics ==
The Monroe Vikings are a part of the CIF East Valley League. Monroe offers sports such as:

- Baseball
- Boys Basketball
- Boys Soccer
- Boys Volleyball
- Boys Wrestling
- Cheerleading
- Cross Country
- Football
- Girls Basketball
- Girls Flag Football
- Girls Soccer
- Girls Volleyball
- Girls Wrestling
- Golf
- Softball
- Track & Field

== Magnet schools ==
The school offers three Magnet programs to prepare students to pursue careers in law, EMR, fire science, fire occupation, police science, criminology, forensics, and related fields.

=== Monroe Law and Government Magnet [1] ===
- Established in 1991
- It is the first established Law and Government magnet program in California
- Activities like mock trials, debate team, internships, Junior Statesmen of America membership, and invitations to events by local politicians
- Graduates accepted at top universities including Harvard, Stanford, Yale, USC, UC Berkeley, UCLA

=== Monroe Police Academy Magnet [2] ===
Established in 1996

- Founded through a partnership between the Los Angeles Police Department (LAPD) and LAUSD; Monroe was one of the first two schools to launch the program
- Academically and physically rigorous law enforcement pathway with specialized courses in criminal law, constitutional law, communication skills, computer crime, and physical training aligned with LAPD standards
- Simulates the LAPD recruit academy with uniforms, inspections, grooming standards, leadership ranks, drill team, and officer-led instruction
- Provides direct career exposure through a full-time LAPD officer, field trips to specialized units (Bomb Squad, Crime Lab, Mounted Unit), and preparation for careers such as patrol officer, sheriff deputy, FBI analyst, military police, and CHP officer

=== Monroe Fire Academy Magnet (Michael D. McComb Firefighter EMS Academy) [3] ===
Established in 1999

- First fire academy created in the Los Angeles Unified School District (LAUSD)
- Prepares over 90 cadets for careers and college pathways in firefighting, EMS, and public service
- Provides real firefighter training through partnerships with LAFD and Los Angeles Valley College, including hands-on training at the Frank Hotchkins Memorial Training Center
- Offers physical training, first aid & CPR certification, leadership ranks, community service, and realistic emergency response simulations

== Mock trial competitions ==
Because of the Law and Government Magnet, Monroe has its own courtroom. It has a mock trial team that competes in the Los Angeles County Mock Trial Competition run by the Constitutional Rights Foundation, where about 80 schools compete each year. From 2002 to 2007, Monroe reached the semifinals four times, and the quarterfinals two times. In 2008, it reached the finals but lost to Gabrielino High.In 2009, Monroe once again took 2nd place, losing by .76% to Louisville High School, a private all-girls school.

== Notable alumni ==
- Angelyne, model, Los Angeles icon
- Meredith Baxter, actress, producer (briefly attended during her sophomore year)
- Guy Benjamin, NFL quarterback for the Dolphins, Saints, and 49ers
- Brandon Browner, NFL player for the Seahawks, Patriots and Saints
- Larry Cedar, TV character actor
- Doug DeCinces, former Major League Baseball player for the Baltimore Orioles and California Angels
- John Ennis, former Major League Baseball player
- Jon V. Ferrara, computer software entrepreneur, CEO of Nimble, co-founder of Golmine CRM
- Hopsin, rapper
- Jimmy Keegan, drummer for Spock's Beard, Santana and Kenny Loggins
- Lori Lively, actress and older sister of Blake Lively and Jason Lively
- Wayne Massey, actor, recording artist, musician, music producer, CEO; varsity baseball pitcher for Monroe and drafted by Los Angeles Angels
- Kevin Mitnick, computer security consultant and convicted hacker
- William T. Perkins, Jr., Medal of Honor recipient, Vietnam War, 1967
- Gary M. Rose, Medal of Honor recipient, Vietnam War, 1970
- Kerry Rossall, stuntman and actor
- Sharon Shapiro, gymnast
- Steve Wapnick, former Major League Baseball player
- Ron Wasserman, award-winning television composer, songwriter and producer
- Debra Winger, Academy Award-nominated actress
