= 1963 Ivy League football season =

- League: NCAA University Division
- Sport: Football
- Duration: September 28, 1963 – November 30, 1963
- Teams: 8

1964 NFL Draft
- Top draft pick: Gary Wood (Cornell)
- Picked by: New York Giants, 109th overall

Regular season
- Champions: Dartmouth, Princeton

Football seasons
- ← 1962 1964 →

1963 Ivy League football standings
	Conf.					Overall
Team	W		L		T	W		L		T
Dartmouth +	5	–	2	–	0	7	–	2	–	0
Princeton +	5	–	2	–	0	7	–	2	–	0
Harvard	4	–	2	–	1	5	–	2	–	2
Yale	4	–	3	–	0	6	–	3	–	0
Cornell	4	–	3	–	0	5	–	4	–	0
Columbia	2	–	4	–	1	4	–	4	–	1
Brown	2	–	5	–	0	3	–	5	–	0
Penn	1	–	6	–	0	3	–	6	–	0
+ – Conference co-champions

The 1963 Ivy League football season was the eighth season of college football play for the Ivy League and was part of the 1963 NCAA University Division football season. The season began on September 28, 1963, and ended on November 30, 1963. Ivy League teams were 13–1–1 against non-conference opponents and Dartmouth and Princeton won the conference co-championship.

== Season overview ==
Conf. Rank	Team	Head coach	AP final	AP high	Overall record	Conf. record	PPG	PAG
1 (tie)	Dartmouth	Bob Blackman	NR	NR	7–2	5–2	19.4	10.4
1 (tie)	Princeton	Dick Colman	NR	NR	7–2	5–2	27.4	9.2
3	Harvard	John Yovicsin	NR	NR	5–2–2	4–2–1	13.6	8.4
4 (tie)	Yale	Jordan Olivar	NR	NR	6–3	4–3	15.0	8.7
4 (tie)	Cornell	Tom Harp	NR	NR	5–4	4–3	16.9	18.3
6	Columbia	Aldo Donelli	NR	NR	4–4–1	2–4–1	21.1	18.3
7	Brown	John McLaughry	NR	NR	3–5	2–5	19.6	21.0
8	Penn	John Stiegman	NR	NR	3–6	1–6	10.8	21.0

== Schedule ==
Index to colors and formatting
Ivy League member won
Ivy League member lost
Ivy League teams in **bold**

=== Week 1 ===
Date	Visiting team	Home team	Site	Result
September 28	**Columbia**	Brown	Brown Stadium • Providence, RI	**COL** 41–14
September 28	Massachusetts	Harvard	Harvard Stadium • Boston, MA	**T** 0–0
September 28	Bucknell	Dartmouth	Memorial Field • Hanover, NH	**W** 20–18
September 28	Rutgers	Princeton	Palmer Stadium • Princeton, NJ	**W** 24–0
September 28	Connecticut	Yale	Yale Bowl • New Haven, CT	**W** 3–0
September 28	Colgate	Cornell	Schoellkopf Field • Ithaca, NY	**L** 17–21
September 28	Lafayette	Penn	Franklin Field • Philadelphia, PA	**W** 47–0

=== Week 2 ===
Date	Visiting team	Home team	Site	Result
October 5	**Princeton**	**Columbia**	Baker Field • New York City, NY	**PRIN** 7–6
October 5	Rutgers	**Harvard**	Harvard Stadium • Boston, MA	**W** 28–0
October 5	**Dartmouth**	**Penn**	Franklin Field • Philadelphia, PA	**DART** 28–0
October 5	**Brown**	**Yale**	Yale Bowl • New Haven, CT	**BROWN** 12–7
October 5	Lehigh	**Cornell**	Schoellkopf Field • Ithaca, NY	**W** 24–0

=== Week 3 ===
Date	Visiting team	Home team	Site	Result
October 12	**Columbia**	**Yale**	Yale Bowl • New Haven, CT	**YALE** 19–7
October 12	**Cornell**	**Harvard**	Harvard Stadium • Boston, MA	**HAR** 21–14
October 12	**Brown**	**Dartmouth**	Memorial Field • Hanover, NH	**DART** 14–7
October 12	**Penn**	**Princeton**	Palmer Stadium • Princeton, NJ	**PRIN** 34–0

=== Week 4 ===
Date	Visiting team	Home team	Site	Result
October 19	**Columbia**	**Harvard**	Harvard Stadium • Boston, MA	**TIE** 3–3
October 19	Holy Cross	**Dartmouth**	Memorial Field • Hanover, NH	**W** 13–8
October 19	Colgate	**Princeton**	Palmer Stadium • Princeton, NJ	**W** 42–0
October 19	**Yale**	**Cornell**	Schoellkopf Field • Ithaca, NY	**COR** 13–10
October 19	**Penn**	**Brown**	Brown Stadium • Providence, RI	**BROWN** 41–13

=== Week 5 ===
Date	Visiting team	Home team	Site	Result
October 26	Lehigh	Columbia	Baker Field • New York City, NY	**W** 42–21
October 26	**Dartmouth**	Harvard	Harvard Stadium • Boston, MA	**HAR** 17–13
October 26	**Cornell**	Princeton	Palmer Stadium • Princeton, NJ	**PRIN** 51–14
October 26	Colgate	Yale	Yale Bowl • New Haven, CT	**W** 31–0
October 26	Rutgers	Penn	Franklin Field • Philadelphia, PA	**W** 7–6
October 26	Rhode Island	Brown	Brown Stadium • Providence, RI	**W** 33–7

=== Week 6 ===
Date	Visiting team	Home team	Site	Result
November 2	**Columbia**	**Cornell**	Schoellkopf Field • Ithaca, NY	**COR** 18–17
November 2	**Harvard**	**Penn**	Franklin Field • Philadelphia, PA	**PENN** 7–2
November 2	**Dartmouth**	**Yale**	Yale Bowl • New Haven, CT	**YALE** 10–6
November 2	**Brown**	**Princeton**	Palmer Stadium • Princeton, NJ	**PRIN** 34–13

=== Week 7 ===
Date	Visiting team	Home team	Site	Result
November 9	**Dartmouth**	**Columbia**	Baker Field • New York City, NY	**DART** 47–6
November 9	**Princeton**	**Harvard**	Harvard Stadium • Boston, MA	**HAR** 21–7
November 9	**Yale**	**Penn**	Franklin Field • Philadelphia, PA	**YALE** 28–7
November 9	**Brown**	**Cornell**	Schoellkopf Field • Ithaca, NY	**COR** 28–25

=== Week 8 ===
Date	Visiting team	Home team	Site	Result
November 16	**Penn**	**Columbia**	Baker Field • New York City, NY	**COL** 33–8
November 16	**Harvard**	**Brown**	Brown Stadium • Providence, RI	**HAR** 24–12
November 16	**Cornell**	**Dartmouth**	Memorial Field • Hanover, NH	**DART** 12–7
November 16	**Yale**	**Princeton**	Palmer Stadium • Princeton, NJ	**PRIN** 27–7

=== Week 9 ===
Date	Visiting team	Home team	Site	Result
November 28	**Cornell**	**Penn**	Franklin Field • Philadelphia, PA	**COR** 17–8
November 30	**Columbia**	Rutgers	Rutgers Stadium • Piscataway, NJ	**R** 35–28
November 30	**Harvard**	**Yale**	Yale Bowl • New Haven, CT	**YALE** 20–6
November 30	**Dartmouth**	**Princeton**	Palmer Stadium • Princeton, NJ	**DART** 22–21

== 1964 NFL draft ==
Two Ivy League players were drafted in the 1964 NFL draft, held in December 1963: Gary Wood and Dick Niglio.

Rnd.	Pick No.	NFL team	Player	Pos.	College	Conf.	Notes
8	109	New York Giants	Gary Wood	QB	Cornell	Ivy	
20	280	Chicago Bears	Dick Niglio	FB	Yale	Ivy	
