= 1965 Columbia Lions football team =

American college football season

1965 Columbia Lions football
- Conference: Ivy League
- Record: 2–7 (1–6 Ivy)
- Head coach: Aldo Donelli (9th season)
- Captain: Ronald Brookshire
- Home stadium: Baker Field

1965 Ivy League football standings
	Conf.					Overall
Team	W		L		T	W		L		T
Dartmouth $	7	–	0	–	0	9	–	0	–	0
Princeton	6	–	1	–	0	8	–	1	–	0
Harvard	3	–	2	–	2	5	–	2	–	2
Cornell	3	–	3	–	1	4	–	3	–	2
Yale	3	–	4	–	0	3	–	6	–	0
Penn	2	–	4	–	1	4	–	4	–	1
Brown	1	–	6	–	0	2	–	7	–	0
Columbia	1	–	6	–	0	2	–	7	–	0
$ – Conference champion

The 1965 Columbia Lions football team was an American football team that represented Columbia University during the 1965 NCAA University Division football season. Columbia tied for last in the Ivy League.

In their ninth season under head coach Aldo "Buff" Donelli, the Lions compiled a 2–7 record and were outscored 199 to 83. Ronald Brookshire was the team captain.

The Lions' 1–6 conference record tied for seventh in the Ivy League standings. Columbia was outscored 208 to 61 by Ivy opponents.

Columbia played its home games at Baker Field in Upper Manhattan, in New York City.

== Schedule ==
Date	Opponent	Site	Result	Attendance	Source
September 25	Lafayette*	Baker Field; New York, NY	L 10–14	8,514	
October 2	Princeton^{†}	Baker Field; New York, NY	L 0–31	20,137	
October 9	at Harvard	Harvard Stadium; Boston, MA	L 6–21	12,000	
October 16	Yale	Baker Field; New York, NY	W 21–7	13,562	
October 23	Rutgers*	Baker Field; New York, NY	W 12–7	18,000	
October 30	at Cornell	Schoellkopf Field; Ithaca, NY (rivalry)	L 6–20	13,000	
November 6	Dartmouth	Baker Field; New York, NY	L 0–47	15,269	
November 13	at Penn	Franklin Field; Philadelphia, PA	L 21–31	9,382	
November 20	Brown	Baker Field; New York, NY	L 7–51	11,368	
*Non-conference game; ^{†}Homecoming
