= 1965 Bucknell Bison football team =

American college football season

1965 Bucknell Bison football

MAC University Division champion
- Conference: Middle Atlantic Conference
- University Division
- Record: 6–3 (5–1 MAC)
- Head coach: Carroll Huntress (1st season)
- Captain: T. Geoffrey Traub
- Home stadium: Memorial Stadium

1965 Middle Atlantic Conference football standings
	Conf.					Overall
Team	W		L		T	W		L		T
University Division
Bucknell x	5	–	1	–	0	6	–	3	–	0
Hofstra	4	–	1	–	0	8	–	2	–	0
Temple	3	–	2	–	0	5	–	5	–	0
Delaware	3	–	3	–	0	5	–	4	–	0
Gettysburg	2	–	4	–	0	5	–	4	–	0
Lehigh	1	–	3	–	0	1	–	8	–	0
Lafayette	1	–	5	–	0	3	–	7	–	0
Northern College Division
Wilkes x	6	–	1	–	0	7	–	1	–	0
Upsala	5	–	2	–	0	5	–	3	–	0
Lycoming	4	–	2	–	0	5	–	3	–	0
Juniata	3	–	2	–	0	3	–	5	–	0
Moravian	4	–	4	–	0	5	–	4	–	0
Albright	3	–	4	–	0	4	–	5	–	0
Wagner	2	–	3	–	0	3	–	6	–	0
Susquehanna *	0	–	3	–	0	0	–	9	–	0
Southern College Division
Swarthmore x	6	–	0	–	0	6	–	1	–	0
Dickinson	7	–	1	–	0	7	–	1	–	0
Drexel	4	–	2	–	0	6	–	2	–	0
Lebanon Valley	4	–	3	–	0	5	–	3	–	0
Franklin & Marshall	3	–	4	–	0	4	–	4	–	0
Haverford	2	–	3	–	0	2	–	5	–	0
Western Maryland	2	–	4	–	0	3	–	6	–	0
Pennsylvania Military	2	–	6	–	0	2	–	7	–	0
Muhlenberg	1	–	8	–	0	1	–	8	–	0
Johns Hopkins	1	–	4	–	1	1	–	6	–	1
Ursinus	1	–	4	–	1	1	–	6	–	1
West Chester *	0	–	0	–	0	5	–	3	–	0
x – Division champion/co-champions; * – Ineligible for championship due to insufficient conference games

The 1965 Bucknell Bison football team was an American football team that represented Bucknell University as a member of the University Division of the Middle Atlantic Conference (MAC) during the 1965 NCAA College Division football season. In their first year under head coach Carroll Huntress, the Bison compiled an overall record of 6–3 with a mark of 5–1 in conference play, winning the MAC University Division title. T. Geoffrey Traub was the team captain. After winning their first two games, the Bison were ranked No. 18 in the UPI small college poll, but lost that week to Penn and dropped out of the rankings. Despite recovering with a conference-winning record, they remained unranked through the end of the year. Bucknell played home games at Memorial Stadium on the university's campus in Lewisburg, Pennsylvania.

== Schedule ==
Date	Opponent	Site	Result	Attendance	Source
September 25	at Gettysburg	Musselman Stadium; Gettysburg, PA	W 19–10	6,400–6,500	
October 9	Temple^{†}	Memorial Stadium; Lewisburg, PA	W 40–14	7,500	
October 16	at Penn*	Franklin Field; Philadelphia, PA	L 13–16	12,667	
October 23	at Lafayette	Fisher Field; Easton, PA	L 13–14	7,000–7,200	
October 30	No. 15 Hofstra	Memorial Stadium; Lewisburg, PA	W 33–6	9,250	
November 6	at Colgate*	Colgate Athletic Field; Hamilton, NY	L 7–21	6,000	
November 13	Lehigh	Memorial Stadium; Lewisburg, PA	W 41–0	6,200–7,200	
November 20	Delaware	Memorial Stadium; Lewisburg, PA	W 26–14	7,700	
November 27	vs. Davidson*	Memorial Stadium; Charlotte, NC (Carrousel Bowl)	W 22–14	5,000–7,200	
*Non-conference game; ^{†}Homecoming; Rankings from UPI Poll released prior to the game
