= 1965 Harvard Crimson football team =

American college football season

1965 Harvard Crimson football
- Conference: Ivy League
- Record: 5–2–2 (3–2–2 Ivy)
- Head coach: John Yovicsin (9th season)
- Defensive coordinator: James S. Lentz (4th season)
- Captain: Kenneth L. Boyda
- Home stadium: Harvard Stadium

1965 Ivy League football standings
	Conf.					Overall
Team	W		L		T	W		L		T
Dartmouth $	7	–	0	–	0	9	–	0	–	0
Princeton	6	–	1	–	0	8	–	1	–	0
Harvard	3	–	2	–	2	5	–	2	–	2
Cornell	3	–	3	–	1	4	–	3	–	2
Yale	3	–	4	–	0	3	–	6	–	0
Penn	2	–	4	–	1	4	–	4	–	1
Brown	1	–	6	–	0	2	–	7	–	0
Columbia	1	–	6	–	0	2	–	7	–	0
$ – Conference champion

The 1965 Harvard Crimson football team was an American football team that represented Harvard University during the 1965 NCAA University Division football season. Harvard finished third in the Ivy League.

In their ninth year under head coach John Yovicsin, the Crimson compiled a 5–2–2 record and outscored opponents 120 to 62. Kenneth L. Boyda was the team captain.

Harvard's 3–2–2 conference record was the third-best in the Ivy League standings. The Crimson outscored Ivy opponents 70 to 55.

Harvard played its home games at Harvard Stadium in the Allston neighborhood of Boston, Massachusetts.

Actor Tommy Lee Jones was a guard on the team.

== Schedule ==
Date	Opponent	Site	Result	Attendance	Source
September 25	Holy Cross*	Harvard Stadium; Boston, MA	W 17–7	20,000	
October 2	Tufts*	Harvard Stadium; Boston, MA	W 33–0	15,000	
October 9	Columbia	Harvard Stadium; Boston, MA	W 21–6	12,000	
October 16	at Cornell	Schoellkopf Field; Ithaca, NY	T 3–3	20,000	
October 23	Dartmouth	Harvard Stadium; Boston, MA (rivalry)	L 0–14	39,000	
October 30	at Penn	Franklin Field; Philadelphia, PA (rivalry)	T 10–10	16,415	
November 6	Princeton	Harvard Stadium; Boston, MA (rivalry)	L 6–14	34,000	
November 13	at Brown	Brown Stadium; Providence, RI	W 17–8	7,300	
November 20	at Yale	Yale Bowl; New Haven, CT (The Game)	W 13–0	50,819	
*Non-conference game
