= 1963 Bucknell Bison football team =

American college football season

1963 Bucknell Bison football
- Conference: Middle Atlantic Conference
- University Division
- Record: 6–3 (3–1 MAC)
- Head coach: Bob Odell (6th season)
- Captains: Thomas Boyd; William Swineford
- Home stadium: Memorial Stadium

1963 Middle Atlantic Conference football standings
	Conf.					Overall
Team	W		L		T	W		L		T
University Division
No. 2 Delaware x	4	–	0	–	0	8	–	0	–	0
Bucknell	3	–	1	–	0	6	–	3	–	0
Gettysburg	2	–	2	–	0	5	–	4	–	0
Temple	1	–	2	–	0	5	–	3	–	1
Lehigh	1	–	3	–	0	1	–	8	–	0
Lafayette	1	–	4	–	0	1	–	8	–	0
Northern College Division
Upsala x	4	–	1	–	0	6	–	2	–	0
Wagner	4	–	1	–	0	6	–	3	–	0
Albright	2	–	3	–	0	3	–	5	–	0
Moravian	2	–	4	–	0	2	–	4	–	0
Wilkes	2	–	5	–	0	3	–	5	–	0
Lycoming	1	–	5	–	0	1	–	7	–	0
Juniata *	3	–	1	–	0	5	–	3	–	0
Susquehanna *	2	–	1	–	0	8	–	1	–	0
Hofstra *	0	–	0	–	0	3	–	6	–	0
Southern College Division
Western Maryland x	4	–	0	–	0	6	–	1	–	1
Muhlenberg	4	–	1	–	0	5	–	3	–	0
Dickinson	5	–	2	–	0	5	–	2	–	0
Swarthmore	4	–	2	–	0	4	–	3	–	0
Drexel	3	–	2	–	0	5	–	3	–	0
Lebanon Valley	4	–	3	–	0	4	–	3	–	0
Pennsylvania Military	3	–	5	–	0	3	–	6	–	0
Ursinus	2	–	4	–	1	2	–	4	–	1
Haverford	2	–	4	–	0	2	–	5	–	0
Franklin & Marshall	1	–	4	–	0	1	–	6	–	0
Johns Hopkins	0	–	4	–	1	0	–	6	–	1
West Chester *	0	–	0	–	0	7	–	1	–	0
x – Division champion/co-champions; * – Ineligible for championship due to insufficient conference games; Rankings from AP Poll

The 1963 Bucknell Bison football team was an American football team that represented Bucknell University during the 1963 NCAA College Division football season. Bucknell finished second in the University Division of the Middle Atlantic Conference.

In its sixth season under head coach Bob Odell, the team compiled a 6–3 record. Thomas Boyd and William Swineford were the team captains.

Bucknell's 3–1 record against division opponents seemingly set the stage for a thrilling season-ender against undefeated Delaware, with a share of the conference championship at stake. The season ended prematurely, however, with the assassination of John F. Kennedy the day before kickoff. Initially, Bucknell announced the game would be played, but late on Friday night – after most other conferences and colleges had decided to cancel their games, but too late to catch the Blue Hens before they arrived in Western Pennsylvania – they reversed that decision. Bucknell offered Delaware the option to make up the game after Thanksgiving, but Delaware coach Dave Nelson declined, saying waiting that long, and playing a football game with a national tragedy so fresh in everyone's memory, would be "anticlimactic".

Bucknell played its home games at Memorial Stadium on the university campus in Lewisburg, Pennsylvania.

== Schedule ==
Date	Opponent	Site	Result	Attendance	Source
September 21	at Gettysburg	Memorial Field; Gettysburg, PA	W 19–7	5,200	
September 28	at Dartmouth*	Memorial Field; Hanover, NH	L 18–20	10,000	
October 5	at UMass*	Alumni Field; Amherst, MA	L 0–21	8,100	
October 12	Ohio Wesleyan*	Memorial Stadium; Lewisburg, PA	W 31–6	5,000	
October 19	Tufts^{†}*	Memorial Stadium; Lewisburg, PA	W 21–14	6,500	
October 26	at Lafayette	Fisher Field; Easton, PA	L 13–14	5,500	
November 2	Temple	Memorial Stadium; Lewisburg, PA	W 14–3	7,500	
November 9	at Colgate*	Colgate Athletic Field; Hamilton, NY	W 14–0	3,500	
November 16	Lehigh	Memorial Stadium; Lewisburg, PA	W 34–12	2,200–3,000	
November 23	No. 1 Delaware^	Memorial Stadium; Lewisburg, PA	Canceled		
*Non-conference game; ^{†}Homecoming; ^Canceled following the assassination of John F. Kennedy the previous day.; Rankings from UPI Poll released prior to the game
