= 1965 Cornell Big Red football team =

American college football season

1965 Cornell Big Red football
- Conference: Ivy League
- Record: 4–3–2 (3–3–1 Ivy)
- Head coach: Tom Harp (5th season)
- Captain: Phil Ratner
- Home stadium: Schoellkopf Field

1965 Ivy League football standings
| | Conf. | | | | | Overall |
| Team | W | | L | | T | W | | L | | T |
|---|---|---|---|---|---|---|---|---|---|---|
| Dartmouth $ | 7 | – | 0 | – | 0 | 9 | – | 0 | – | 0 |
| Princeton | 6 | – | 1 | – | 0 | 8 | – | 1 | – | 0 |
| Harvard | 3 | – | 2 | – | 2 | 5 | – | 2 | – | 2 |
| Cornell | 3 | – | 3 | – | 1 | 4 | – | 3 | – | 2 |
| Yale | 3 | – | 4 | – | 0 | 3 | – | 6 | – | 0 |
| Penn | 2 | – | 4 | – | 1 | 4 | – | 4 | – | 1 |
| Brown | 1 | – | 6 | – | 0 | 2 | – | 7 | – | 0 |
| Columbia | 1 | – | 6 | – | 0 | 2 | – | 7 | – | 0 |
$ – Conference champion

The 1965 Cornell Big Red football team was an American football team that represented Cornell University during the 1965 NCAA University Division football season. Cornell finished fourth in the Ivy League .

In its fifth and final season under head coach Tom Harp, the team compiled a 4–3–2 record and outscored opponents 192 to 137. Phil Ratner was the team captain.

Cornell's 3–3–1 conference record placed fourth in the Ivy League standings. The Big Red outscored Ivy opponents 143 to 124.

Cornell played its home games at Schoellkopf Field in Ithaca, New York.

== Schedule ==
| Date | Opponent | Site | Result | Attendance | Source |
|---|---|---|---|---|---|
| September 25 | Colgate* | Schoellkopf Field; Ithaca, NY (rivalry) | T 0–0 | 19,000 | |
| October 2 | at Lehigh* | Taylor Stadium; Bethlehem, PA | W 49–13 | 8,622 | |
| October 9 | Princeton | Schoellkopf Field; Ithaca, NY | L 27–36 | 21,000 | |
| October 16 | Harvard | Schoellkopf Field; Ithaca, NY | T 3–3 | 20,000 | |
| October 23 | at Yale | Yale Bowl; New Haven, CT | L 14–24 | 33,545 | |
| October 30 | Columbia | Schoellkopf Field; Ithaca, NY (rivalry) | W 20–6 | 13,000 | |
| November 6 | Brown | Schoellkopf Field; Ithaca, NY | W 41–21 | 13,000 | |
| November 13 | at Dartmouth | Memorial Field; Hanover, NH (rivalry) | L 0–20 | 12,000 | |
| November 25 | at Penn | Franklin Field; Philadelphia, PA (rivalry) | W 38–14 | 10,543 | |
*Non-conference game
