= 1963 Drexel Dragons football team =

American college football season

1963 Drexel Dragons football
- Conference: Middle Atlantic Conference
- Southern College Division
- Record: 5–3 (3–2 MAC)
- Head coach: Tom Grebis (3rd season)
- Home stadium: Drexel Field

1963 Middle Atlantic Conference football standings
	Conf.					Overall
Team	W		L		T	W		L		T
University Division
No. 2 Delaware x	4	–	0	–	0	8	–	0	–	0
Bucknell	3	–	1	–	0	6	–	3	–	0
Gettysburg	2	–	2	–	0	5	–	4	–	0
Temple	1	–	2	–	0	5	–	3	–	1
Lehigh	1	–	3	–	0	1	–	8	–	0
Lafayette	1	–	4	–	0	1	–	8	–	0
Northern College Division
Upsala x	4	–	1	–	0	6	–	2	–	0
Wagner	4	–	1	–	0	6	–	3	–	0
Albright	2	–	3	–	0	3	–	5	–	0
Moravian	2	–	4	–	0	2	–	4	–	0
Wilkes	2	–	5	–	0	3	–	5	–	0
Lycoming	1	–	5	–	0	1	–	7	–	0
Juniata *	3	–	1	–	0	5	–	3	–	0
Susquehanna *	2	–	1	–	0	8	–	1	–	0
Hofstra *	0	–	0	–	0	3	–	6	–	0
Southern College Division
Western Maryland x	4	–	0	–	0	6	–	1	–	1
Muhlenberg	4	–	1	–	0	5	–	3	–	0
Dickinson	5	–	2	–	0	5	–	2	–	0
Swarthmore	4	–	2	–	0	4	–	3	–	0
Drexel	3	–	2	–	0	5	–	3	–	0
Lebanon Valley	4	–	3	–	0	4	–	3	–	0
Pennsylvania Military	3	–	5	–	0	3	–	6	–	0
Ursinus	2	–	4	–	1	2	–	4	–	1
Haverford	2	–	4	–	0	2	–	5	–	0
Franklin & Marshall	1	–	4	–	0	1	–	6	–	0
Johns Hopkins	0	–	4	–	1	0	–	6	–	1
West Chester *	0	–	0	–	0	7	–	1	–	0
x – Division champion/co-champions; * – Ineligible for championship due to insufficient conference games; Rankings from AP Poll

The 1963 Drexel Dragons football team represented the Drexel Institute of Technology (renamed Drexel University in 1970) as a member of the Middle Atlantic Conference during the 1963 NCAA College Division football season. Tom Grebis was the team's head coach.

The 1963 season was the first season the football team played at the new Drexel Field (later renamed Vitas Field), located at 43rd and Powelton in Philadelphia, Pennsylvania.

== Schedule ==
Date	Time	Opponent	Site	Result	Attendance	Source
September 28	1:30 p.m.	Coast Guard*	Drexel Field; Philadelphia, PA	L 0–3	3,000	
October 5	1:30 p.m.	Lebanon Valley	Drexel Field; Philadelphia, PA	W 30–6	3,300	
October 12	1:30 p.m.	Lycoming	Drexel Field; Philadelphia, PA	W 22–7	3,000	
October 19	1:30 p.m.	Delaware Valley*	Drexel Field; Philadelphia, PA	W 43–15	3,000	
October 26	2:00 p.m.	at Wilkes	Wilkes College Athletic Field; Wilkes-Barre, PA	W 23–14	2,800	
November 2	1:30 p.m.	at Pennsylvania Military	PMC Stadium; Chester, PA	L 0–10	2,500	
November 9	1:30 p.m.	King's*^{†}	Drexel Field; Philadelphia, PA	W 16–0	6,500	
November 16	1:30 p.m.	at Western Maryland	Westminster, MD	L 6–7	2,000	
November 23	1:30 p.m.	at Dickinson	(cancelled due to JFK assassination)	Cancelled		
*Non-conference game; ^{†}Homecoming; All times are in Eastern time

== Roster ==
1963 Drexel Dragons football team roster
Players
Coaches
Offense

Pos.	#	Name	Class
TE	39	Bob Brennan	Sr
OT	64	Don Mankin	Sr
G	61	Chuck Niessner	Jr
C	53	Jules Bosch	Sr
G	63	Tony Giuliante	So
OT	49	Joel Gotchel	Sr
TE	40	Chuck Farrell	So
HB	24	John Schlichtig	Sr
HB	27	Rich Thatcher	Jr
FB, TE	32	Harry Purnell	Sr
QB	17	Fran Crovetti	Jr
TE	36	Hal Vang	Jr
TE	37	Hank Nowak	So
TE	41	Russ DeLuca	So
TE	38	Frank Gallo	Sr
TE	42	Larry Veit	So
TE	43	Phil Hall	Sr
TE	44	Irv Campbell	So
OT	47	Al Anderman	Jr
OT	54	Mike Higgins	So
OT	56	Nick Polivka	So
OT	57	Sante Camo	So
OT	62	Ted Passyn	Sr
OT	65	Ron Heckman	So
G	45	John Smith	Sr
G	48	George Guerra	Jr
G	51	Rich Cecchine	So
G	58	Bob Steel	So
G	59	Matt Kennedy	So
G	60	Bill Whitorff	Jr
C	50	Brud Shaw	Sr
C	52	Don Brown	So
C	53	Jules Bosch	Sr
C	55	Bob Muntz	So
HB	22	Ed Bogdan	Jr
HB	21	Carl Valentino	So
HB	23	Rich Sullivan	So
HB	25	Dave Leahy	Jr
HB	30	Skip Lombardi	So
HB	33	Ken Prescott	So
FB	31	Bruno Ceccarelli	Jr
FB	34	Harry Heinzl	So
FB	35	Tom McVeigh	So
QB	20	Tim Patterson	Sr
QB	19	Bob King	Sr
QB	18	Don Harmatuck	Jr
QB, P	16	Howie Guarini	Jr

Defense

Pos.	#	Name	Class

Special teams

Pos.	#	Name	Class

Head coach

- Tom Grebis (Drexel)

Coordinators/assistant coaches

- Don Shank (Penn State)
- Herman Epstein (Maryland)
- Joe Renaldi (McDaniel)
- Bill Magee (Villanova)

Legend

- (C) Team captain
- (S) Suspended
- (I) Ineligible
- Injured
- Redshirt
