= 1963 Yale Bulldogs football team =

American college football season

1963 Yale Bulldogs football
- Conference: Ivy League
- Record: 6–3 (4–3 Ivy)
- Head coach: John Pont (1st season)
- Captain: George Humphrey
- Home stadium: Yale Bowl

1963 Ivy League football standings
	Conf.					Overall
Team	W		L		T	W		L		T
Dartmouth +	5	–	2	–	0	7	–	2	–	0
Princeton +	5	–	2	–	0	7	–	2	–	0
Harvard	4	–	2	–	1	5	–	2	–	2
Yale	4	–	3	–	0	6	–	3	–	0
Cornell	4	–	3	–	0	5	–	4	–	0
Columbia	2	–	4	–	1	4	–	4	–	1
Brown	2	–	5	–	0	3	–	5	–	0
Penn	1	–	6	–	0	3	–	6	–	0
+ – Conference co-champions

The 1963 Yale Bulldogs football team represented Yale University in the 1963 NCAA University Division football season. The Bulldogs were led by first-year head coach John Pont, played their home games at the Yale Bowl and finished fourth in the Ivy League with a 4–3 record, 6–3 overall. The November 23 game against Harvard was postponed to November 30 due to the assassination of President Kennedy on November 22.

== Schedule ==
Date	Opponent	Site	Result	Attendance	Source
September 28	Connecticut*	Yale Bowl; New Haven, CT	W 3–0	30,610–30,614	
October 5	Brown	Yale Bowl; New Haven, CT	L 7–12	24,716	
October 12	Columbia	Yale Bowl; New Haven, CT	W 19–7	28,507	
October 19	at Cornell	Schoellkopf Field; Ithaca, NY	L 10–13	21,000	
October 26	Colgate*	Yale Bowl; New Haven, CT	W 31–0	29,827	
November 2	Dartmouth	Yale Bowl; New Haven, CT	W 10–6	32,926	
November 9	at Penn	Franklin Field; Philadelphia, PA	W 28–7	14,205	
November 16	at Princeton	Palmer Stadium; Princeton, NJ (rivalry)	L 7–27	42,000	
November 30^	Harvard	Yale Bowl; New Haven, CT (rivalry)	W 20–6	51,000	
*Non-conference game; ^Postponed from November 23 after the assassination of John F. Kennedy

== NFL draft ==
The following Bulldog was selected in the National Football League draft following the season.

Round	Pick	Player	Position	NFL team
20	280	Dick Niglio	FB	Chicago Bears
