= 1963 UMass Redmen football team =

American college football season

1963 UMass Redmen football

Yankee Conference champion
- Conference: Yankee Conference

Ranking
- Coaches: No. 3
- AP: No. 4
- Record: 8–0–1 (5–0 Yankee)
- Head coach: Vic Fusia (3rd season)
- Home stadium: Alumni Field

1963 Yankee Conference football standings
	Conf.					Overall
Team	W		L		T	W		L		T
UMass $	5	–	0	–	0	8	–	0	–	1
Maine	3	–	2	–	0	5	–	3	–	0
Rhode Island	2	–	3	–	0	4	–	5	–	0
Vermont	2	–	2	–	0	6	–	2	–	0
Connecticut	1	–	3	–	0	2	–	6	–	0
New Hampshire	1	–	4	–	0	2	–	6	–	0
$ – Conference champion

The 1963 UMass Redmen football team represented the University of Massachusetts Amherst in the 1963 NCAA College Division football season as a member of the Yankee Conference. The team was coached by Vic Fusia and played its home games at Alumni Field in Amherst, Massachusetts. The Redmen defense was stifling all year long, as they surrendered only one touchdown through the entire season. Outscoring their opponents 265–12, UMass finished undefeated for the third in team history and the most recent time to date. The one imperfection on the team's record was a 0–0 tie on the road against in-state rival Harvard. UMass finished the season with a record of 8–0–1 overall and 5–0 in conference play.

== Schedule ==
Date	Opponent	Rank	Site	Result	Attendance	Source
September 21	at Maine		Alumni Field; Orono, ME	W 14–7	5,000–6,000	
September 28	at Harvard*		Harvard Stadium; Boston, MA	T 0–0	16,000–16,500	
October 5	Bucknell*		Alumni Field; Amherst, MA	W 21–0	8,100	
October 12	at Connecticut		Memorial Stadium; Storrs, CT (rivalry)	W 21–3	10,937	
October 19	Rhode Island		Alumni Field; Amherst, MA	W 57–0	10,233–11,000	
October 26	at Boston University*		Nickerson Field; Boston, MA	W 21–0	12,000	
November 2	Vermont	No. 8	Alumni Field; Amherst, MA	W 41–0	6,449–6,500	
November 9	American International*	No. T–4	Alumni Field; Amherst, MA	W 42–0	3,500	
November 16	at New Hampshire	No. T–4	Cowell Stadium; Durham, NH (rivalry)	W 48–2	5,500–6,000	
*Non-conference game; Rankings from AP Poll released prior to the game
