= 1963 Vermont Catamounts football team =

American college football season

1963 Vermont Catamounts football
- Conference: Yankee Conference
- Record: 6–2 (2–2 Yankee)
- Head coach: Bob Clifford (2nd season)
- Home stadium: Centennial Field

1963 Yankee Conference football standings
	Conf.					Overall
Team	W		L		T	W		L		T
UMass $	5	–	0	–	0	8	–	0	–	1
Maine	3	–	2	–	0	5	–	3	–	0
Rhode Island	2	–	3	–	0	4	–	5	–	0
Vermont	2	–	2	–	0	6	–	2	–	0
Connecticut	1	–	3	–	0	2	–	6	–	0
New Hampshire	1	–	4	–	0	2	–	6	–	0
$ – Conference champion

The 1963 Vermont Catamounts football team was an American football team that represented the University of Vermont in the Yankee Conference during the 1963 NCAA College Division football season. In their second year, under head coach Bob Clifford, the team compiled a 6–2 record.

== Schedule ==
Date	Opponent	Site	Result	Attendance	Source
September 21	at American International*	AIC Park; Springfield, MA	W 14–6	1,500	
September 28	Army "B"*	Centennial Field; Burlington, VT	W 12–0	6,000	
October 5	at Maine	Alumni Field; Orono, ME	L 13–14	5,700–6,900	
October 12	Rhode Island	Centennial Field; Burlington, VT	W 21–6	5,500–7,000	
October 19	New Hampshire	Centennial Field; Burlington, VT	W 28–6	7,000	
October 26	Norwich*	Centennial Field; Burlington, VT	W 27–0	7,100	
November 2	at No. 8 UMass	Alumni Stadium; Hadley, MA	L 0–41	6,449–6,500	
November 9	at Middlebury*	Porter Field; Middlebury, VT	W 14–0	2,000–4,100	
*Non-conference game; Rankings from AP Poll released prior to the game
