= 1965 Lehigh Engineers football team =

American college football season

1965 Lehigh Engineers football

Middle Three Conference co-champion
- Conference: Middle Atlantic Conference
- University Division
- Record: 1–8 (1–3 MAC)
- Head coach: Fred Dunlap (1st season)
- Captains: Robert Draucher; Harold Yeich
- Home stadium: Taylor Stadium

1965 Middle Atlantic Conference football standings
| | Conf. | | | | | Overall |
| Team | W | | L | | T | W | | L | | T |
|---|---|---|---|---|---|---|---|---|---|---|
University Division
| Bucknell x | 5 | – | 1 | – | 0 | 6 | – | 3 | – | 0 |
| Hofstra | 4 | – | 1 | – | 0 | 8 | – | 2 | – | 0 |
| Temple | 3 | – | 2 | – | 0 | 5 | – | 5 | – | 0 |
| Delaware | 3 | – | 3 | – | 0 | 5 | – | 4 | – | 0 |
| Gettysburg | 2 | – | 4 | – | 0 | 5 | – | 4 | – | 0 |
| Lehigh | 1 | – | 3 | – | 0 | 1 | – | 8 | – | 0 |
| Lafayette | 1 | – | 5 | – | 0 | 3 | – | 7 | – | 0 |
Northern College Division
| Wilkes x | 6 | – | 1 | – | 0 | 7 | – | 1 | – | 0 |
| Upsala | 5 | – | 2 | – | 0 | 5 | – | 3 | – | 0 |
| Lycoming | 4 | – | 2 | – | 0 | 5 | – | 3 | – | 0 |
| Juniata | 3 | – | 2 | – | 0 | 3 | – | 5 | – | 0 |
| Moravian | 4 | – | 4 | – | 0 | 5 | – | 4 | – | 0 |
| Albright | 3 | – | 4 | – | 0 | 4 | – | 5 | – | 0 |
| Wagner | 2 | – | 3 | – | 0 | 3 | – | 6 | – | 0 |
| Susquehanna * | 0 | – | 3 | – | 0 | 0 | – | 9 | – | 0 |
Southern College Division
| Swarthmore x | 6 | – | 0 | – | 0 | 6 | – | 1 | – | 0 |
| Dickinson | 7 | – | 1 | – | 0 | 7 | – | 1 | – | 0 |
| Drexel | 4 | – | 2 | – | 0 | 6 | – | 2 | – | 0 |
| Lebanon Valley | 4 | – | 3 | – | 0 | 5 | – | 3 | – | 0 |
| Franklin & Marshall | 3 | – | 4 | – | 0 | 4 | – | 4 | – | 0 |
| Haverford | 2 | – | 3 | – | 0 | 2 | – | 5 | – | 0 |
| Western Maryland | 2 | – | 4 | – | 0 | 3 | – | 6 | – | 0 |
| Pennsylvania Military | 2 | – | 6 | – | 0 | 2 | – | 7 | – | 0 |
| Muhlenberg | 1 | – | 8 | – | 0 | 1 | – | 8 | – | 0 |
| Johns Hopkins | 1 | – | 4 | – | 1 | 1 | – | 6 | – | 1 |
| Ursinus | 1 | – | 4 | – | 1 | 1 | – | 6 | – | 1 |
| West Chester * | 0 | – | 0 | – | 0 | 5 | – | 3 | – | 0 |
x – Division champion/co-champions; * – Ineligible for championship due to insufficient conference games

The 1965 Lehigh Engineers football team was an American football team that represented Lehigh University during the 1965 NCAA College Division football season. Lehigh finished second-to-last in the Middle Atlantic Conference, University Division, and was one of three co-champions in the Middle Three Conference.

In their first year under head coach Fred Dunlap, the Engineers compiled a 1–8 record. Robert Draucher and Harold Yeich were the team captains.

In conference play, Lehigh's 1–3 record against opponents in the MAC University Division represented the sixth-best winning percentage in the seven-team circuit, ahead of Lafayette's 1–5. All three teams in the Middle Three recorded one win and one loss against league rivals, splitting the championship three ways. Lehigh beat Lafayette, its only win of the year, but lost to Rutgers.

Lehigh played its home games at Taylor Stadium on the university campus in Bethlehem, Pennsylvania.

== Schedule ==
| Date | Opponent | Site | Result | Attendance | Source |
|---|---|---|---|---|---|
| September 25 | at Penn* | Franklin Field; Philadelphia, PA | L 14–20 | 8,666 | |
| October 2 | Cornell* | Taylor Stadium; Bethlehem, PA | L 13–49 | 8,622 | |
| October 9 | at Rutgers | Rutgers Stadium; Piscataway, NJ | L 0–6 | 12,800 | |
| October 16 | Gettysburg | Taylor Stadium; Bethlehem, PA | L 17–26 | 9,556 | |
| October 23 | Delaware | Taylor Stadium; Bethlehem, PA (rivalry) | L 21–42 | 6,000 | |
| October 30 | Furman* | Taylor Stadium; Bethlehem, PA | L 15–27 | 5,500 | |
| November 6 | at Davidson* | Richardson Stadium; Davidson, NC | L 23–37 | 7,200 | |
| November 13 | at Bucknell | Memorial Stadium; Lewisburg, PA | L 0–41 | 6,200–7,200 | |
| November 20 | Lafayette | Taylor Stadium; Bethlehem, PA (The Rivalry) | W 20–14 | 13,000 | |
*Non-conference game
