= 1965 Brown Bears football team =

American college football season

1965 Brown Bears football
- Conference: Ivy League
- Record: 2–7 (1–6 Ivy)
- Head coach: John McLaughry (7th season)
- Offensive scheme: Wing-T
- Captains: Bob Hall; Rich O’Toole
- Home stadium: Brown Stadium

1965 Ivy League football standings
| | Conf. | | | | | Overall |
| Team | W | | L | | T | W | | L | | T |
|---|---|---|---|---|---|---|---|---|---|---|
| Dartmouth $ | 7 | – | 0 | – | 0 | 9 | – | 0 | – | 0 |
| Princeton | 6 | – | 1 | – | 0 | 8 | – | 1 | – | 0 |
| Harvard | 3 | – | 2 | – | 2 | 5 | – | 2 | – | 2 |
| Cornell | 3 | – | 3 | – | 1 | 4 | – | 3 | – | 2 |
| Yale | 3 | – | 4 | – | 0 | 3 | – | 6 | – | 0 |
| Penn | 2 | – | 4 | – | 1 | 4 | – | 4 | – | 1 |
| Brown | 1 | – | 6 | – | 0 | 2 | – | 7 | – | 0 |
| Columbia | 1 | – | 6 | – | 0 | 2 | – | 7 | – | 0 |
$ – Conference champion

The 1965 Brown Bears football team was an American football team that represented Brown University during the 1965 NCAA University Division football season. Brown tied for last in the Ivy League.

In their seventh season under head coach John McLaughry, the Bears compiled a 2–7 record and were outscored 169 to 128. Quarterback Bob Hall and defensive end Rich O’Toole were the team captains.

The Bears' 1–6 conference record tied for seventh in the Ivy League standings. They were outscored by Ivy opponents 208 to 61.

Brown played its home games at Brown Stadium in Providence, Rhode Island.

== Schedule ==
| Date | Opponent | Site | Result | Attendance | Source |
|---|---|---|---|---|---|
| September 25 | Rhode Island* | Brown Stadium; Providence, RI (rivalry) | L 6–14 | 8,300 | |
| October 2 | at Penn | Franklin Field; Philadelphia, PA | L 0–7 | 7,654 | |
| October 9 | at Yale | Yale Bowl; New Haven, CT | L 0–3 | 12,400 | |
| October 16 | Dartmouth^{†} | Brown Stadium; Providence, RI | L 9–35 | 12,800 | |
| October 23 | Colgate* | Brown Stadium; Providence, RI | W 6–0 | 9,100 | |
| October 30 | at Princeton | Palmer Stadium; Princeton, NJ | L 27–45 | 22,000 | |
| November 6 | at Cornell | Schoellkopf Field; Ithaca, NY | L 21–41 | 13,000 | |
| November 13 | Harvard | Brown Stadium; Providence, RI | L 8–17 | 7,300 | |
| November 20 | at Columbia | Baker Field; New York, NY | W 51–7 | 11,368 | |
*Non-conference game; ^{†}Homecoming
