= 1963 Delaware Fightin' Blue Hens football team =

American college football season

1963 Delaware Fightin' Blue Hens football

UPI small college national champion Lambert Cup MAC University Division champion
- Conference: Middle Atlantic Conference
- University Division
- Record: 8–0 (4–0 MAC)
- Head coach: David M. Nelson (13th season)
- Captain: Paul Chesmore
- Home stadium: Delaware Stadium

1963 Middle Atlantic Conference football standings
| | Conf. | | | | | Overall |
| Team | W | | L | | T | W | | L | | T |
|---|---|---|---|---|---|---|---|---|---|---|
University Division
| No. 2 Delaware x | 4 | – | 0 | – | 0 | 8 | – | 0 | – | 0 |
| Bucknell | 3 | – | 1 | – | 0 | 6 | – | 3 | – | 0 |
| Gettysburg | 2 | – | 2 | – | 0 | 5 | – | 4 | – | 0 |
| Temple | 1 | – | 2 | – | 0 | 5 | – | 3 | – | 1 |
| Lehigh | 1 | – | 3 | – | 0 | 1 | – | 8 | – | 0 |
| Lafayette | 1 | – | 4 | – | 0 | 1 | – | 8 | – | 0 |
Northern College Division
| Upsala x | 4 | – | 1 | – | 0 | 6 | – | 2 | – | 0 |
| Wagner | 4 | – | 1 | – | 0 | 6 | – | 3 | – | 0 |
| Albright | 2 | – | 3 | – | 0 | 3 | – | 5 | – | 0 |
| Moravian | 2 | – | 4 | – | 0 | 2 | – | 4 | – | 0 |
| Wilkes | 2 | – | 5 | – | 0 | 3 | – | 5 | – | 0 |
| Lycoming | 1 | – | 5 | – | 0 | 1 | – | 7 | – | 0 |
| Juniata * | 3 | – | 1 | – | 0 | 5 | – | 3 | – | 0 |
| Susquehanna * | 2 | – | 1 | – | 0 | 8 | – | 1 | – | 0 |
| Hofstra * | 0 | – | 0 | – | 0 | 3 | – | 6 | – | 0 |
Southern College Division
| Western Maryland x | 4 | – | 0 | – | 0 | 6 | – | 1 | – | 1 |
| Muhlenberg | 4 | – | 1 | – | 0 | 5 | – | 3 | – | 0 |
| Dickinson | 5 | – | 2 | – | 0 | 5 | – | 2 | – | 0 |
| Swarthmore | 4 | – | 2 | – | 0 | 4 | – | 3 | – | 0 |
| Drexel | 3 | – | 2 | – | 0 | 5 | – | 3 | – | 0 |
| Lebanon Valley | 4 | – | 3 | – | 0 | 4 | – | 3 | – | 0 |
| Pennsylvania Military | 3 | – | 5 | – | 0 | 3 | – | 6 | – | 0 |
| Ursinus | 2 | – | 4 | – | 1 | 2 | – | 4 | – | 1 |
| Haverford | 2 | – | 4 | – | 0 | 2 | – | 5 | – | 0 |
| Franklin & Marshall | 1 | – | 4 | – | 0 | 1 | – | 6 | – | 0 |
| Johns Hopkins | 0 | – | 4 | – | 1 | 0 | – | 6 | – | 1 |
| West Chester * | 0 | – | 0 | – | 0 | 7 | – | 1 | – | 0 |
x – Division champion/co-champions; * – Ineligible for championship due to insufficient conference games; Rankings from AP Poll

The 1963 Delaware Fightin' Blue Hens football team was an American football team that represented the University of Delaware as a member of the Middle Atlantic Conference (MAC) during the 1963 NCAA College Division football season. In their 13th season under head coach David M. Nelson, the Blue Hens compiled an 8–0 record (4–0 in conference games), outscored opponents by a total of 290 to 76, and won the MAC University Division championship.

After the season, Delaware was named by the United Press International (UPI) as the national small college football champion. Delaware outranked No. 2 Northern Illinois, receiving 18 first place votes (and 309 points) from the coaches to eight (and 285 points) for Northern Illinois. The Associated Press (AP), on the other hand, ranked Northern Illinois No. 1 (63 points) and Delaware No. 2 (53 points). Delaware also won the Lambert Cup as the best College Division team in the east.

Delaware halfback Mike Brown was selected by the AP as a first-team player on its 1963 All East team as well as its 1963 Little All-America college football team. Brown led the team and the MAC with 78 points scored (48 in MAC games) and 838 rushing yards (434 in MAC games). Due to the cancellation of the Bucknell game, Brown fell 36 yards short of the school's single-season rushing record.

Paul Chesmore was Delaware's team captain. Other key players included quarterback Chuck Zolak.

On October 5, 1963, the Hens established a MAC record with 505 yards of total offense. They eclipsed that record one week later with 596 yards against Lafayette.

The team played its home games at Delaware Stadium in Newark, Delaware.

== Schedule ==
| Date | Opponent | Rank | Site | Result | Attendance | Source |
|---|---|---|---|---|---|---|
| September 28 | at Lehigh | | Delaware Stadium; Newark, DE (rivalry) | W 30–0 | 9,364 | |
| October 5 | Gettysburg | No. 2 | Delaware Stadium; Newark, DE | W 64–18 | 10,100–10,110 | |
| October 12 | at Lafayette | No. 3 | Fisher Field; Easton, PA | W 61–0 | 4,000 | |
| October 19 | at Ohio* | No. 3 | Peden Stadium; Athens, OH | W 29–12 | 15,000 | |
| October 26 | at Connecticut* | No. 2 | Memorial Stadium; Storrs, CT | W 26–14 | 8,087 | |
| November 2 | Buffalo* | No. 2 | Delaware Stadium; Newark, DE | W 34–6 | 10,500 | |
| November 9 | Temple | No. 1 | Delaware Stadium; Newark, DE | W 32–23 | 10,100–10,183 | |
| November 16 | at Rutgers* | No. 1 | Rutgers Stadium; Piscataway, NJ | W 14–3 | 16,000–17,000 | |
| November 23 | Bucknell | No. 1 | Lewisburg, PA | Canceled | | |
*Non-conference game; Rankings from UPI Coaches Poll released prior to the game

== Cancellation of Bucknell game ==
The season finale against MAC University Division runner-up Bucknell was canceled following the assassination of President John F. Kennedy. The game had been heavily hyped, as Bucknell had a 3–1 conference record and could force a championship tie by winning. Initially, Bucknell announced the game would be played, but late on Friday night – after most other conferences and colleges had decided to cancel their games, but too late to catch the Blue Hens before they arrived in Western Pennsylvania – they reversed that decision. Bucknell offered Delaware the option to make up the game after Thanksgiving, but Delaware coach Dave Nelson declined, saying waiting that long, and playing a football game with a national tragedy so fresh in everyone's memory, would be "anticlimactic".
