= 1965 Drexel Dragons football team =

American college football season

1965 Drexel Dragons football
- Conference: Middle Atlantic Conference
- Southern College Division
- Record: 6–2 (4–2 MAC)
- Head coach: Tom Grebis (5th season)
- Home stadium: Drexel Field

1965 Middle Atlantic Conference football standings
	Conf.					Overall
Team	W		L		T	W		L		T
University Division
Bucknell x	5	–	1	–	0	6	–	3	–	0
Hofstra	4	–	1	–	0	8	–	2	–	0
Temple	3	–	2	–	0	5	–	5	–	0
Delaware	3	–	3	–	0	5	–	4	–	0
Gettysburg	2	–	4	–	0	5	–	4	–	0
Lehigh	1	–	3	–	0	1	–	8	–	0
Lafayette	1	–	5	–	0	3	–	7	–	0
Northern College Division
Wilkes x	6	–	1	–	0	7	–	1	–	0
Upsala	5	–	2	–	0	5	–	3	–	0
Lycoming	4	–	2	–	0	5	–	3	–	0
Juniata	3	–	2	–	0	3	–	5	–	0
Moravian	4	–	4	–	0	5	–	4	–	0
Albright	3	–	4	–	0	4	–	5	–	0
Wagner	2	–	3	–	0	3	–	6	–	0
Susquehanna *	0	–	3	–	0	0	–	9	–	0
Southern College Division
Swarthmore x	6	–	0	–	0	6	–	1	–	0
Dickinson	7	–	1	–	0	7	–	1	–	0
Drexel	4	–	2	–	0	6	–	2	–	0
Lebanon Valley	4	–	3	–	0	5	–	3	–	0
Franklin & Marshall	3	–	4	–	0	4	–	4	–	0
Haverford	2	–	3	–	0	2	–	5	–	0
Western Maryland	2	–	4	–	0	3	–	6	–	0
Pennsylvania Military	2	–	6	–	0	2	–	7	–	0
Muhlenberg	1	–	8	–	0	1	–	8	–	0
Johns Hopkins	1	–	4	–	1	1	–	6	–	1
Ursinus	1	–	4	–	1	1	–	6	–	1
West Chester *	0	–	0	–	0	5	–	3	–	0
x – Division champion/co-champions; * – Ineligible for championship due to insufficient conference games

The 1965 Drexel Dragons football team represented the Drexel Institute of Technology (renamed Drexel University in 1970) as a member of the Middle Atlantic Conference during the 1965 NCAA College Division football season. Tom Grebis was the team's head coach.

== Schedule ==
Date	Time	Opponent	Site	Result	Attendance
October 2		at Upsala	East Orange, NJ	L 7–12	1,500
October 9	1:30 pm	at Lebanon Valley	Annville, PA	W 12–8	2,000
October 16	1:30 pm	Wagner^{†}	Drexel Field; Philadelphia, PA	W 23–21	6,000
October 23	1:30 pm	at Delaware Valley*	Doylestown, PA	W 29–0	1,500
October 30		at Pennsylvania Military	Chester, PA	W 14–6	2,800
November 6	1:30 pm	Merchant Marine*	Drexel Field; Philadelphia, PA	W 22–7	2,200
November 13		at Western Maryland	Hoffa Field; Westminster, MD	W 12–7	2,200
November 20	1:30 pm	Albright	Drexel Field; Philadelphia, PA	L 0–21	2,000
*Non-conference game; ^{†}Homecoming; All times are in Eastern time

== Roster ==
1965 Drexel Dragons football team roster
Players
Coaches
Offense

Pos.	#	Name	Class
TE	40	Chuck Farrell	Sr
G		Tony Giuliante (C)	Sr
TE, K		Irv Campbell	Sr
HB, P	32	Ken Wise	Jr
FB		Skip Lombardi	Sr
QB		Don Harmatuck	Sr
OT		Norm Shotwell	Jr
TE	43	Chuck Walters
TE		Russ DeLuca	Sr
TE		Larry Veit	Sr
HB		Rich Sullivan
HB		Dennis Willcox	Jr
FB		Mike Poulonis
QB		John Kuzan	Jr
[[American football positions|]]		Larry Colbert	So
[[American football positions|]]	51	Rich Cecchine
[[American football positions|]]	55	Bob Muntz	Sr
[[American football positions|]]		Mike Higgins	Sr
[[American football positions|]]		Hammond	So
[[American football positions|]]		Tony Stonis	So
[[American football positions|]]		Jim Carr	So
[[American football positions|]]		Tony Godonis
[[American football positions|]]	50	Tom McVeigh	Sr
[[American football positions|]]		Karcher	Jr
[[American football positions|]]	60	John Juzwick
[[American football positions|]]		Tony Gromalski

Defense

Pos.	#	Name	Class

Special teams

Pos.	#	Name	Class

Head coach

- Tom Grebis (Drexel)

Coordinators/assistant coaches

Legend

- (C) Team captain
- (S) Suspended
- (I) Ineligible
- Injured
- Redshirt
