= 1965 Yale Bulldogs football team =

American college football season

1965 Yale Bulldogs football
- Conference: Ivy League
- Record: 3–6 (3–4 Ivy)
- Head coach: Carmen Cozza (1st season)
- Home stadium: Yale Bowl

1965 Ivy League football standings
	Conf.					Overall
Team	W		L		T	W		L		T
Dartmouth $	7	–	0	–	0	9	–	0	–	0
Princeton	6	–	1	–	0	8	–	1	–	0
Harvard	3	–	2	–	2	5	–	2	–	2
Cornell	3	–	3	–	1	4	–	3	–	2
Yale	3	–	4	–	0	3	–	6	–	0
Penn	2	–	4	–	1	4	–	4	–	1
Brown	1	–	6	–	0	2	–	7	–	0
Columbia	1	–	6	–	0	2	–	7	–	0
$ – Conference champion

The 1965 Yale Bulldogs football team represented Yale University in the 1965 NCAA University Division football season. The Bulldogs were led by first-year head coach Carmen Cozza, played their home games at the Yale Bowl and finished fifth in the Ivy League with a 3–4 record, 3–6 overall.

== Schedule ==
Date	Opponent	Site	Result	Attendance	Source
September 25	Connecticut*	Yale Bowl; New Haven, CT	L 6–13	34,157	
October 2	Colgate*	Yale Bowl; New Haven, CT	L 0–7	26,676	
October 9	at Brown	Brown Stadium; Providence, RI	W 3–0	12,400	
October 16	at Columbia	Baker Field; New York, NY	L 7–21	13,562	
October 23	Cornell	Yale Bowl; New Haven, CT	W 24–14	33,545	
October 30	Dartmouth	Yale Bowl; New Haven, CT	L 17–20	39,549	
November 6	Penn	Yale Bowl; New Haven, CT	W 21–19	29,421	
November 13	at Princeton	Palmer Stadium; Princeton, NJ (rivalry)	L 6–31	38,000	
November 20	Harvard	Yale Bowl; New Haven, CT (The Game)	L 0–13	50,819	
*Non-conference game
