= 1963 Hofstra Flying Dutchmen football team =

American college football season

1963 Hofstra Flying Dutchmen football
- Conference: Middle Atlantic Conference
- Northern College Division
- Record: 3–6 (0–0 MAC)
- Head coach: Howdy Myers (14th season)
- Captains: Ray DiScala; Len Garille
- Home stadium: Hofstra Stadium

1963 Middle Atlantic Conference football standings
	Conf.					Overall
Team	W		L		T	W		L		T
University Division
No. 2 Delaware x	4	–	0	–	0	8	–	0	–	0
Bucknell	3	–	1	–	0	6	–	3	–	0
Gettysburg	2	–	2	–	0	5	–	4	–	0
Temple	1	–	2	–	0	5	–	3	–	1
Lehigh	1	–	3	–	0	1	–	8	–	0
Lafayette	1	–	4	–	0	1	–	8	–	0
Northern College Division
Upsala x	4	–	1	–	0	6	–	2	–	0
Wagner	4	–	1	–	0	6	–	3	–	0
Albright	2	–	3	–	0	3	–	5	–	0
Moravian	2	–	4	–	0	2	–	4	–	0
Wilkes	2	–	5	–	0	3	–	5	–	0
Lycoming	1	–	5	–	0	1	–	7	–	0
Juniata *	3	–	1	–	0	5	–	3	–	0
Susquehanna *	2	–	1	–	0	8	–	1	–	0
Hofstra *	0	–	0	–	0	3	–	6	–	0
Southern College Division
Western Maryland x	4	–	0	–	0	6	–	1	–	1
Muhlenberg	4	–	1	–	0	5	–	3	–	0
Dickinson	5	–	2	–	0	5	–	2	–	0
Swarthmore	4	–	2	–	0	4	–	3	–	0
Drexel	3	–	2	–	0	5	–	3	–	0
Lebanon Valley	4	–	3	–	0	4	–	3	–	0
Pennsylvania Military	3	–	5	–	0	3	–	6	–	0
Ursinus	2	–	4	–	1	2	–	4	–	1
Haverford	2	–	4	–	0	2	–	5	–	0
Franklin & Marshall	1	–	4	–	0	1	–	6	–	0
Johns Hopkins	0	–	4	–	1	0	–	6	–	1
West Chester *	0	–	0	–	0	7	–	1	–	0
x – Division champion/co-champions; * – Ineligible for championship due to insufficient conference games; Rankings from AP Poll

The 1963 Hofstra Flying Dutchmen football team was an American football team that represented Hofstra University during the 1963 NCAA College Division football season. Hofstra was nominally a member of the |Northern College Division of the Middle Atlantic Conference (MAC), but played no games within the conference.

In their 14th year under head coach Howard "Howdy" Myers Jr., the Flying Dutchmen compiled a 3–6 record, and were outscored 234 to 219. Ray DiScala and Len Garille were the team captains.

This was Hofstra's last year in the MAC College–Northern Division. Just before the season began, the MAC's executive committee approved Hofstra's transfer to the more competitive University Division, effective in September 1964. In six years of MAC football play, Hofstra had never played enough College Division teams to qualify for the division championship, instead playing mostly local opponents in the New York metropolitan area and New England, as well as several members of the MAC University Division. The 1963 schedule featured no MAC College Division opponents and only one MAC University Division opponent, Temple.

With their first home game of 1963, the Flying Dutchmen opened their new home field, Hofstra Stadium in Hempstead on Long Island, New York.

== Schedule ==
Date	Opponent	Site	Result	Attendance	Source
September 21	at Springfield*	Pratt Field; Springfield, MA	L 21–41	1,600	
September 28	American International*	Hofstra Stadium; Hempstead, NY	W 34–6	3,000	
October 12	Bridgeport*^{†}	Hofstra Stadium; Hempstead, NY	W 40–7	4,500	
October 19	at Merchant Marine*	Tomb Field; Kings Point, NY	W 45–19		
October 26	at Temple*	Temple Stadium; Philadelphia, PA	L 14–46	9,200	
November 2	at Southern Connecticut*	Jess Dow Field; New Haven, CT	L 25–27		
November 9	Rhode Island*	Hofstra Stadium; Hempstead, NY	L 7–23	3,500	
November 16	Albion*	Hofstra Stadium; Hempstead, NY	L 12–35	2,000	
November 28	C.W. Post*	Hofstra Stadium; Hempstead, NY	L 21–30	6,500	
*Non-conference game; ^{†}Homecoming
