= 1965 Penn Quakers football team =

American college football season

1965 Penn Quakers football
- Conference: Ivy League
- Record: 4–4–1 (2–4–1 Ivy)
- Head coach: Bob Odell (1st season)
- Captain: Fred Jaffin
- Home stadium: Franklin Field

1965 Ivy League football standings
| | Conf. | | | | | Overall |
| Team | W | | L | | T | W | | L | | T |
|---|---|---|---|---|---|---|---|---|---|---|
| Dartmouth $ | 7 | – | 0 | – | 0 | 9 | – | 0 | – | 0 |
| Princeton | 6 | – | 1 | – | 0 | 8 | – | 1 | – | 0 |
| Harvard | 3 | – | 2 | – | 2 | 5 | – | 2 | – | 2 |
| Cornell | 3 | – | 3 | – | 1 | 4 | – | 3 | – | 2 |
| Yale | 3 | – | 4 | – | 0 | 3 | – | 6 | – | 0 |
| Penn | 2 | – | 4 | – | 1 | 4 | – | 4 | – | 1 |
| Brown | 1 | – | 6 | – | 0 | 2 | – | 7 | – | 0 |
| Columbia | 1 | – | 6 | – | 0 | 2 | – | 7 | – | 0 |
$ – Conference champion

The 1965 Penn Quakers football team was an American football team that represented the University of Pennsylvania during the 1965 NCAA University Division football season. Penn finished sixth in the Ivy League.

In its first year under head coach Bob Odell, this team compiled a 4–4–1 record and was outscored 192 to 136. Fred Jaffin was the team captain.

Penn's 2-4-1 conference record placed sixth in the Ivy League. The Quakers were outscored 165 to 100 by Ivy opponents.

Penn played its home games at Franklin Field adjacent to the university's campus in Philadelphia, Pennsylvania.

== Schedule ==
| Date | Opponent | Site | Result | Attendance | Source |
|---|---|---|---|---|---|
| September 25 | Lehigh* | Franklin Field; Philadelphia, PA | W 20–14 | 8,666 | |
| October 2 | Brown | Franklin Field; Philadelphia, PA | W 7–0 | 7,654 | |
| October 9 | at Dartmouth | Memorial Field; Hanover, NH | L 19–24 | 13,909 | |
| October 16 | Bucknell* | Franklin Field; Philadelphia, PA | W 16–13 | 12,667 | |
| October 23 | at Princeton | Palmer Stadium; Princeton, NJ (rivalry) | L 0–51 | 26,000 | |
| October 30 | Harvard | Franklin Field; Philadelphia, PA (rivalry) | T 10–10 | 16,415 | |
| November 6 | at Yale | Yale Bowl; New Haven, CT | L 19–21 | 29,421 | |
| November 13 | Columbia | Franklin Field; Philadelphia, PA | W 31–21 | 9,382 | |
| November 25 | Cornell | Franklin Field; Philadelphia, PA (rivalry) | L 14–38 | 10,543 | |
*Non-conference game
