= 1963 New Hampshire Wildcats football team =

American college football season

1963 New Hampshire Wildcats football
- Conference: Yankee Conference
- Record: 2–6 (1–4 Yankee)
- Head coach: Chief Boston (15th season)
- Home stadium: Cowell Stadium

1963 Yankee Conference football standings
	Conf.					Overall
Team	W		L		T	W		L		T
UMass $	5	–	0	–	0	8	–	0	–	1
Maine	3	–	2	–	0	5	–	3	–	0
Rhode Island	2	–	3	–	0	4	–	5	–	0
Vermont	2	–	2	–	0	6	–	2	–	0
Connecticut	1	–	3	–	0	2	–	6	–	0
New Hampshire	1	–	4	–	0	2	–	6	–	0
$ – Conference champion

The 1963 New Hampshire Wildcats football team was an American football team that represented the University of New Hampshire as a member of the Yankee Conference during the 1963 NCAA College Division football season. In its 15th year under head coach Chief Boston, the team compiled a 2–6 record (1–4 against conference opponents) and finished last out of six teams in the Yankee Conference.

== Schedule ==
Date	Opponent	Site	Result	Attendance	Source
September 28	Colby*	Cowell Stadium; Durham, NH	W 49–0	5,500	
October 5	at Rhode Island	Meade Stadium; Kingston, RI	W 25–13	6,887–7,000	
October 12	Maine	Cowell Stadium; Durham, NH (Battle for the Brice–Cowell Musket)	L 8–28	9,000–9,500	
October 19	at Vermont	Centennial Field; Burlington, VT	L 6–28	7,000	
October 26	Northeastern*	Cowell Stadium; Durham, NH	L 0–26	7,200–7,250	
November 2	at Connecticut	Memorial Stadium; Storrs, CT	L 6–21	6,485	
November 9	at Springfield*	Pratt Field; Springfield, MA	L 0–7	1,570	
November 16	No T–4 UMass	Cowell Stadium; Durham, NH (rivalry)	L 2–48	5,500–6,000	
*Non-conference game; Rankings from AP Poll released prior to the game
