= 1963 Temple Owls football team =

American college football season

1963 Temple Owls football
- Conference: Middle Atlantic Conference
- University Division
- Record: 5–3–1 (1–2 MAC)
- Head coach: George Makris (4th season)
- Home stadium: Temple Stadium

1963 Middle Atlantic Conference football standings
| | Conf. | | | | | Overall |
| Team | W | | L | | T | W | | L | | T |
|---|---|---|---|---|---|---|---|---|---|---|
University Division
| No. 2 Delaware x | 4 | – | 0 | – | 0 | 8 | – | 0 | – | 0 |
| Bucknell | 3 | – | 1 | – | 0 | 6 | – | 3 | – | 0 |
| Gettysburg | 2 | – | 2 | – | 0 | 5 | – | 4 | – | 0 |
| Temple | 1 | – | 2 | – | 0 | 5 | – | 3 | – | 1 |
| Lehigh | 1 | – | 3 | – | 0 | 1 | – | 8 | – | 0 |
| Lafayette | 1 | – | 4 | – | 0 | 1 | – | 8 | – | 0 |
Northern College Division
| Upsala x | 4 | – | 1 | – | 0 | 6 | – | 2 | – | 0 |
| Wagner | 4 | – | 1 | – | 0 | 6 | – | 3 | – | 0 |
| Albright | 2 | – | 3 | – | 0 | 3 | – | 5 | – | 0 |
| Moravian | 2 | – | 4 | – | 0 | 2 | – | 4 | – | 0 |
| Wilkes | 2 | – | 5 | – | 0 | 3 | – | 5 | – | 0 |
| Lycoming | 1 | – | 5 | – | 0 | 1 | – | 7 | – | 0 |
| Juniata * | 3 | – | 1 | – | 0 | 5 | – | 3 | – | 0 |
| Susquehanna * | 2 | – | 1 | – | 0 | 8 | – | 1 | – | 0 |
| Hofstra * | 0 | – | 0 | – | 0 | 3 | – | 6 | – | 0 |
Southern College Division
| Western Maryland x | 4 | – | 0 | – | 0 | 6 | – | 1 | – | 1 |
| Muhlenberg | 4 | – | 1 | – | 0 | 5 | – | 3 | – | 0 |
| Dickinson | 5 | – | 2 | – | 0 | 5 | – | 2 | – | 0 |
| Swarthmore | 4 | – | 2 | – | 0 | 4 | – | 3 | – | 0 |
| Drexel | 3 | – | 2 | – | 0 | 5 | – | 3 | – | 0 |
| Lebanon Valley | 4 | – | 3 | – | 0 | 4 | – | 3 | – | 0 |
| Pennsylvania Military | 3 | – | 5 | – | 0 | 3 | – | 6 | – | 0 |
| Ursinus | 2 | – | 4 | – | 1 | 2 | – | 4 | – | 1 |
| Haverford | 2 | – | 4 | – | 0 | 2 | – | 5 | – | 0 |
| Franklin & Marshall | 1 | – | 4 | – | 0 | 1 | – | 6 | – | 0 |
| Johns Hopkins | 0 | – | 4 | – | 1 | 0 | – | 6 | – | 1 |
| West Chester * | 0 | – | 0 | – | 0 | 7 | – | 1 | – | 0 |
x – Division champion/co-champions; * – Ineligible for championship due to insufficient conference games; Rankings from AP Poll

The 1963 Temple Owls football team was an American football team that represented Temple University as a member of the Middle Atlantic Conference (MAC) during the 1963 NCAA College Division football season. In its fourth season under head coach George Makris, the team compiled a 5–3–1 record (1–2 against MAC opponents) and finished fourth out of six teams in the MAC's University Division.

Temple's season-ending November 23 matchup with Gettysburg was canceled following the assassination of John F. Kennedy the previous day.

The team played its home games at Temple Stadium in Philadelphia.

== Schedule ==
| Date | Opponent | Site | Result | Attendance | Source |
|---|---|---|---|---|---|
| September 21 | Ithaca* | Temple Stadium; Philadelphia, PA | W 30–21 | 7,500–9,500 | |
| September 28 | at Merchant Marine* | Tomb Field; Kings Point, NY | T 20–20 | 5,000 | |
| October 5 | Connecticut* | Temple Stadium; Philadelphia, PA | W 9–7 | 9,000 | |
| October 12 | Muhlenberg* | Temple Stadium; Philadelphia, PA | W 29–0 | 8,500 | |
| October 19 | Lafayette^{†} | Temple Stadium; Philadelphia, PA | W 31–0 | 9,000 | |
| October 26 | Hofstra* | Temple Stadium; Philadelphia, PA | W 46–14 | 9,200 | |
| November 2 | at Bucknell | Memorial Stadium; Lewisburg, PA | L 3–14 | 7,500 | |
| November 9 | at No. 1 Delaware | Delaware Stadium; Newark, DE | L 23–32 | 10,100–10,183 | |
| November 16 | at Susquehanna* | Stagg Field; Selinsgrove, PA | L 18–22 | 7,800 | |
| November 23 | at Gettysburg | Memorial Field; Gettysburg, PA | Canceled | | |
*Non-conference game; ^{†}Homecoming; Rankings from UPI Poll released prior to the game
