= 1963 Rhode Island Rams football team =

American college football season

1963 Rhode Island Rams football
- Conference: Yankee Conference
- Record: 4–5 (2–3 Yankee)
- Head coach: Jack Zilly (1st season)
- Home stadium: Meade Stadium

1963 Yankee Conference football standings
	Conf.					Overall
Team	W		L		T	W		L		T
UMass $	5	–	0	–	0	8	–	0	–	1
Maine	3	–	2	–	0	5	–	3	–	0
Rhode Island	2	–	3	–	0	4	–	5	–	0
Vermont	2	–	2	–	0	6	–	2	–	0
Connecticut	1	–	3	–	0	2	–	6	–	0
New Hampshire	1	–	4	–	0	2	–	6	–	0
$ – Conference champion

The 1963 Rhode Island Rams football team was an American football team that represented the University of Rhode Island as a member of the Yankee Conference during the 1963 NCAA College Division football season. In its first season under head coach Jack Zilly, the team compiled a 4–5 record (2–3 against conference opponents), finished in third place out of six teams in the Yankee Conference, and was outscored by a total of 219 to 116. The team played its home games at Meade Stadium in Kingston, Rhode Island.

== Schedule ==
Date	Opponent	Site	Result	Attendance	Source
September 21	at Northeastern*	Kent Street Field; Brookline, MA	L 13–28	6,500	
September 28	Maine	Meade Stadium; Kingston, RI	W 20–16	3,600–4,500	
October 5	New Hampshire	Meade Stadium; Kingston, RI	L 13–25	6,887–7,000	
October 12	at Vermont	Centennial Field; Burlington, VT	L 6–21	5,500–7,000	
October 19	at UMass	Alumni Field; Amherst, MA	L 0–57	10,233–11,000	
October 26	at Brown*	Brown Stadium; Providence, RI (rivalry)	L 7–33	10,000 –10,800	
November 2	Springfield*	Meade Stadium; Kingston, RI	W 21–20	1,000	
November 9	at Hofstra*	Hofstra Stadium; Hempstead, NY	W 23–7	3,500	
November 16	vs. Connecticut	Providence City Stadium; Providence, RI (rivalry)	W 13–12	4,500–4,812	
*Non-conference game
