= Tom Grebis =

American football player and coach (1930–2015)

Biographical details
- Born: December 21, 1930; Windber, Pennsylvania, US
- Died: January 24, 2005 (aged 74); Oreland, Pennsylvania, US

Playing career
- 1950–1953: Drexel
- Position: Halfback

Coaching career (HC unless noted)
- 1957–1960: Drexel (assistant)
- 1961–1968: Drexel

Head coaching record
- Overall: 39–24–2

Accomplishments and honors

Championships
- 1 MAC Southern College Division (1962)

Thomas J. Grebis (December 21, 1930 – January 24, 2005) was an American college football player and coach.

He served as the head football coach at Drexel University from 1961 to 1968, compiling a record of 39–24–2. Grebis played football at Drexel as a halfback and was co-captain of the 1953 Drexel Dragons football team. Grebis was a member of Drexel's faculty and taught chemistry. He was an assistant football coach at Drexel for four season before succeeding Jack Hinkle at head coach in 1961.

== Head coaching record ==
| Year | Team | Overall | Conference | Standing | Bowl/playoffs |
|---|---|---|---|---|---|
Drexel Dragons (Middle Atlantic Conference) (1961–1968)
| 1961 | Drexel | 2–5–1 | 1–5–1 | 8th (Southern College) | |
| 1962 | Drexel | 6–2 | 5–1 | T–1st (Southern College) | |
| 1963 | Drexel | 5–3 | 3–2 | 5th (Southern College) | |
| 1964 | Drexel | 7–2 | 4–1 | 2nd (Southern College) | |
| 1965 | Drexel | 6–2 | 4–2 | 3rd (Southern College) | |
| 1966 | Drexel | 6–1–1 | 4–1 | 2nd (Southern College) | |
| 1967 | Drexel | 3–5 | 1–5 | 11th (Southern College) | |
| 1968 | Drexel | 4–4 | 3–1 | NA (Southern College) | |
| Drexel: | | 39–24–2 | 25–18–1 | | |
| Total: | | 39–24–2 | | | |
