= 1963 Maine Black Bears football team =

American college football season

1963 Maine Black Bears football
- Conference: Yankee Conference, Maine Intercollegiate Athletic Association
- Record: 5–3 (3–2 Yankee, 2–1 MIAA)
- Head coach: Harold Westerman (13th season)
- Captains: Daniel Severson; Earle Cooper
- Home stadium: Alumni Field

1963 Yankee Conference football standings
	Conf.					Overall
Team	W		L		T	W		L		T
UMass $	5	–	0	–	0	8	–	0	–	1
Maine	3	–	2	–	0	5	–	3	–	0
Rhode Island	2	–	3	–	0	4	–	5	–	0
Vermont	2	–	2	–	0	6	–	2	–	0
Connecticut	1	–	3	–	0	2	–	6	–	0
New Hampshire	1	–	4	–	0	2	–	6	–	0
$ – Conference champion

The 1963 Maine Black Bears football team was an American football team that represented the University of Maine as a member of the Yankee Conference and Maine Intercollegiate Athletic Association during the 1963 NCAA College Division football season. In its 13th season under head coach Harold Westerman, the team compiled a 5–3 record (3–2 against Yankee Conference and 2–1 against MIAA opponents) and finished second out of the six teams in the Yankee Conference. The team played its home games at Alumni Field in Orono, Maine. Daniel Severson and Earle Cooper were the team captains.

== Schedule ==
Date	Opponent	Site	Result	Attendance	Source
September 21	UMass	Alumni Field; Orono, ME	L 7–14	5,000–6,000	
September 28	at Rhode Island	Meade Stadium; Kingston, RI	L 16–20	3,600–4,500	
October 5	Vermont	Alumni Field; Orono, ME	W 14–13	5,700–6,900	
October 12	at New Hampshire	Cowell Stadium; Durham, NH	W 28–8	9,000–9,500	
October 19	Connecticut	Alumni Field; Orono, ME	W 35–12	9,300	
October 26	at Bates	Garcelon Field; Lewiston, ME	W 49–0	4,800	
November 2	at Colby	Seaverns Field; Waterville, ME	W 53–12	1,500	
November 9	Bowdoin	Alumni Field; Orono, ME	L 0–7	5,280	
