= 1965 Princeton Tigers football team =

American college football season

1965 Princeton Tigers football
- Conference: Ivy League
- Record: 8–1 (6–1 Ivy)
- Head coach: Dick Colman (9th season)
- Captain: G. Paul Savidge
- Home stadium: Palmer Stadium

1965 Ivy League football standings
	Conf.					Overall
Team	W		L		T	W		L		T
Dartmouth $	7	–	0	–	0	9	–	0	–	0
Princeton	6	–	1	–	0	8	–	1	–	0
Harvard	3	–	2	–	2	5	–	2	–	2
Cornell	3	–	3	–	1	4	–	3	–	2
Yale	3	–	4	–	0	3	–	6	–	0
Penn	2	–	4	–	1	4	–	4	–	1
Brown	1	–	6	–	0	2	–	7	–	0
Columbia	1	–	6	–	0	2	–	7	–	0
$ – Conference champion

The 1965 Princeton Tigers football team was an American football team that represented Princeton University during the 1965 NCAA University Division football season. After winning the Ivy League championship the previous year, Princeton dropped to second place.

In their ninth year under head coach Dick Colman, the Tigers compiled an 8–1 record and outscored opponents 281 to 100. G. Paul Savidge was the team captain.

Princeton's 6–1 conference record was the second-best in the Ivy League standings; their only loss was to the conference champion, undefeated Dartmouth, in the final week. The Tigers outscored Ivy opponents 222 to 94.

Princeton played its home games at Palmer Stadium on the university campus in Princeton, New Jersey.

== Schedule ==
Date	Opponent	Site	Result	Attendance	Source
September 25	Rutgers*	Palmer Stadium; Princeton, NJ (rivalry)	W 32–6	40,000	
October 2	at Columbia	Baker Field; New York, NY	W 31–0	20,137	
October 9	at Cornell	Schoellkopf Field; Ithaca, NY	W 36–27	21,000	
October 16	Colgate*	Palmer Stadium; Princeton, NJ	W 27–0	28,000	
October 23	Penn	Palmer Stadium; Princeton, NJ (rivalry)	W 51–0	26,000	
October 30	Brown	Palmer Stadium; Princeton, NJ	W 45–27	22,000	
November 6	at Harvard	Harvard Stadium; Boston, MA (rivalry)	W 14–6	34,000	
November 13	Yale	Palmer Stadium; Princeton, NJ (rivalry)	W 31–6	38,000	
November 20	Dartmouth	Palmer Stadium; Princeton, NJ	L 14–28	45,725	
*Non-conference game
