= 1963 Harvard Crimson football team =

American college football season

1963 Harvard Crimson football
- Conference: Ivy League
- Record: 5–2–2 (4–2–1 Ivy)
- Head coach: John Yovicsin (7th season)
- Defensive coordinator: James S. Lentz (2nd season)
- Captain: William W. Southmayd
- Home stadium: Harvard Stadium

1963 Ivy League football standings
	Conf.					Overall
Team	W		L		T	W		L		T
Dartmouth +	5	–	2	–	0	7	–	2	–	0
Princeton +	5	–	2	–	0	7	–	2	–	0
Harvard	4	–	2	–	1	5	–	2	–	2
Yale	4	–	3	–	0	6	–	3	–	0
Cornell	4	–	3	–	0	5	–	4	–	0
Columbia	2	–	4	–	1	4	–	4	–	1
Brown	2	–	5	–	0	3	–	5	–	0
Penn	1	–	6	–	0	3	–	6	–	0
+ – Conference co-champions

The 1963 Harvard Crimson football team was an American football team that represented Harvard University during the 1963 NCAA University Division football season. Harvard finished third in the Ivy League.

In their seventh year under head coach John Yovicsin, the Crimson compiled a 5–2–2 record and outscored opponents 122 to 76. William W. Southmayd was the team captain.

Harvard's 4–2–1 conference record was the third-best in the Ivy League standings. The Crimson outscored Ivy opponents 94 to 76.

Harvard played its home games at Harvard Stadium in the Allston neighborhood of Boston, Massachusetts.

== Schedule ==
Date	Opponent	Site	Result	Attendance	Source
September 28	UMass*	Harvard Stadium; Boston, MA	T 0–0	16,000–16,500	
October 5	Rutgers*	Harvard Stadium; Boston, MA	W 28–0	12,500	
October 12	Cornell	Harvard Stadium; Boston, MA	W 21–14	16,500	
October 19	Columbia	Harvard Stadium; Boston, MA	T 3–3	15,000	
October 26	Dartmouth	Harvard Stadium; Boston, MA (rivalry)	W 17–13	38,000	
November 2	at Penn	Franklin Field; Philadelphia, PA (rivalry)	L 2–7	11,144	
November 9	Princeton	Harvard Stadium; Boston, MA (rivalry)	W 21–7	25,000	
November 16	at Brown	Brown Stadium; Providence, RI	W 24–12	16,000	
November 30^	at Yale	Yale Bowl; New Haven, CT (rivalry)	L 6–20	51,000	
*Non-conference game; ^Postponed from November 23 after the assassination of John F. Kennedy
