= 1965 Lafayette Leopards football team =

American college football season

1965 Lafayette Leopards football

Middle Three Conference co-champion
- Conference: Middle Atlantic Conference
- University Division
- Record: 3–7 (1–5 MAC)
- Head coach: Kenneth Bunn (3rd season)
- Captains: Thomas Rosenberg; Joseph Smodish; Gabriel Washo
- Home stadium: Fisher Field

1965 Middle Atlantic Conference football standings
	Conf.					Overall
Team	W		L		T	W		L		T
University Division
Bucknell x	5	–	1	–	0	6	–	3	–	0
Hofstra	4	–	1	–	0	8	–	2	–	0
Temple	3	–	2	–	0	5	–	5	–	0
Delaware	3	–	3	–	0	5	–	4	–	0
Gettysburg	2	–	4	–	0	5	–	4	–	0
Lehigh	1	–	3	–	0	1	–	8	–	0
Lafayette	1	–	5	–	0	3	–	7	–	0
Northern College Division
Wilkes x	6	–	1	–	0	7	–	1	–	0
Upsala	5	–	2	–	0	5	–	3	–	0
Lycoming	4	–	2	–	0	5	–	3	–	0
Juniata	3	–	2	–	0	3	–	5	–	0
Moravian	4	–	4	–	0	5	–	4	–	0
Albright	3	–	4	–	0	4	–	5	–	0
Wagner	2	–	3	–	0	3	–	6	–	0
Susquehanna *	0	–	3	–	0	0	–	9	–	0
Southern College Division
Swarthmore x	6	–	0	–	0	6	–	1	–	0
Dickinson	7	–	1	–	0	7	–	1	–	0
Drexel	4	–	2	–	0	6	–	2	–	0
Lebanon Valley	4	–	3	–	0	5	–	3	–	0
Franklin & Marshall	3	–	4	–	0	4	–	4	–	0
Haverford	2	–	3	–	0	2	–	5	–	0
Western Maryland	2	–	4	–	0	3	–	6	–	0
Pennsylvania Military	2	–	6	–	0	2	–	7	–	0
Muhlenberg	1	–	8	–	0	1	–	8	–	0
Johns Hopkins	1	–	4	–	1	1	–	6	–	1
Ursinus	1	–	4	–	1	1	–	6	–	1
West Chester *	0	–	0	–	0	5	–	3	–	0
x – Division champion/co-champions; * – Ineligible for championship due to insufficient conference games

The 1965 Lafayette Leopards football team was an American football team that represented Lafayette College during the 1965 NCAA College Division football season. Lafayette finished last in the Middle Atlantic Conference, University Division, and was one of three co-champions in the Middle Three Conference.

In their third year under head coach Kenneth Bunn, the Leopards compiled a 3–7 record. Thomas Rosenberg, Joseph Smodish and Gabriel Washo were the team captains.

In conference play, Lafayette's 1–5 record against MAC University Division opponents represented the worst winning percentage in the seven-team circuit; Lehigh finished slightly ahead in the standings with a 1–3 record. All three teams in the Middle Three recorded one win and one loss against league rivals, splitting the championship three ways. Lafayette lost to Lehigh but beat Rutgers.

Lafayette played its home games at Fisher Field on College Hill in Easton, Pennsylvania.

== Schedule ==
Date	Opponent	Site	Result	Attendance	Source
September 18	at Colgate*	Colgate Athletic Field; Hamilton, NY	L 0–40	5,800	
September 25	at Columbia*	Baker Field; New York, NY	W 14–10	8,514	
October 2	at No. 10 Hofstra	Hofstra Stadium; Hempstead, NY	L 7–31	4,300–5,000	
October 9	Delaware	Fisher Field; Easton, PA	L 7–40	4,000	
October 16	at Temple	Temple Stadium; Philadelphia, PA	L 12–27	5,500	
October 23	Bucknell	Fisher Field; Easton, PA	W 14–13	7,000–7,200	
October 30	at Gettysburg	Musselman Stadium; Gettysburg, PA	L 20–40	5,950–7,000	
November 6	Rutgers	Fisher Field; Easton, PA	W 23–18	5,000	
November 13	Davidson*	Fisher Field; Easton, PA	L 10–14	3,500–4,000	
November 20	at Lehigh	Taylor Stadium; Bethlehem, PA (The Rivalry)	L 14–20	13,000	
*Non-conference game; Rankings from UPI Poll released prior to the game
