= Carroll Huntress =

American football player and coach (1924–2015)

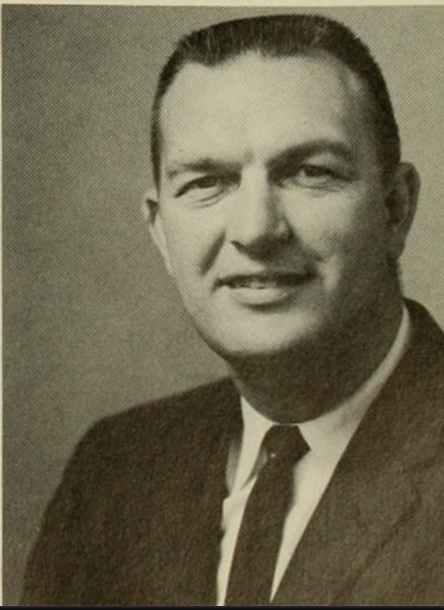
- Huntress, c. 1961

Biographical details
- Born: January 4, 1924; Saco, Maine, U.S.
- Died: February 11, 2015 (aged 91)

Playing career

Football
- c. 1948: New Hampshire

Lacrosse
- c. 1948: New Hampshire
- Positions: Fullback, halfback (football)

Coaching career (HC unless noted)

Football
- 1949: Mechanic Falls HS (ME)
- 1950–1955: Portland HS (ME) (freshman)
- 1956–1959: Portland HS (ME)
- 1960–1963?: Maryland (assistant)
- 1964: Maryland (freshman)
- 1965–1968: Bucknell
- 1969: Kentucky (OL)
- 1970: Kentucky (freshman)
- 1971–1972: Kentucky (OB)
- 1973–1981: New York Jets (scout)

Head coaching record
- Overall: 19–19 (college)

Accomplishments and honors

Championships
- 1 MAC University Division (1965)

Carroll Paul Huntress (January 4, 1924 – February 11, 2015) was an American football coach. He served as the head football coach at Bucknell University from 1965 to 1968, compiling a record of 19–19. Huntress was born on January 4, 1924, in Saco, Maine. After serving in the United States Marine Corps during World War II, he played football and lacrosse the University of New Hampshire. Huntress began his coaching career in 1949 at Mechanic Falls High School in Mechanic Falls, Maine, where he coached football, basketball, and baseball.

== Head coaching record ==
=== College ===
Year	Team	Overall	Conference	Standing	Bowl/playoffs
Bucknell Bison (Middle Atlantic Conference) (1965–1968)
1965	Bucknell	6–3	5–1	1st (University)	
1966	Bucknell	4–5	2–3	T–4th (University)	
1967	Bucknell	4–6	3–2	3rd (University)	
1968	Bucknell	5–5	3–2	2nd (University)	
Bucknell:		19–19	13–8		
Total:		19–19			
National championship Conference title Conference division title or championship game berth
