= 1963 Dartmouth Indians football team =

American college football season

1963 Dartmouth Indians football

Ivy League co-champion
- Conference: Ivy League
- Record: 7–2 (5–2 Ivy)
- Head coach: Bob Blackman (9th season)
- Captain: Scott Creelman
- Home stadium: Memorial Field

1963 Ivy League football standings
	Conf.					Overall
Team	W		L		T	W		L		T
Dartmouth +	5	–	2	–	0	7	–	2	–	0
Princeton +	5	–	2	–	0	7	–	2	–	0
Harvard	4	–	2	–	1	5	–	2	–	2
Yale	4	–	3	–	0	6	–	3	–	0
Cornell	4	–	3	–	0	5	–	4	–	0
Columbia	2	–	4	–	1	4	–	4	–	1
Brown	2	–	5	–	0	3	–	5	–	0
Penn	1	–	6	–	0	3	–	6	–	0
+ – Conference co-champions

The 1963 Dartmouth Indians football team was an American football team that represented Dartmouth College during the 1963 NCAA University Division football season. Following its undefeated Ivy League championship season, Dartmouth was league co-champion in 1963.

In their ninth season under head coach Bob Blackman, the Indians compiled a 7–2 record and outscored opponents 175 to 94. Scott Creelman was the team captain.

The Indians' 5–2 conference record tied for best in the Ivy League. Dartmouth was named co-champion despite defeating the other co-champion, Princeton, in the last week of the season. The Indians outscored Ivy opponents 142 to 68.

Dartmouth played its home games at Memorial Field on the college campus in Hanover, New Hampshire.

== Schedule ==
Date	Opponent	Site	Result	Attendance	Source
September 28	Bucknell*	Memorial Field; Hanover, NH	W 20–18	10,000	
October 5	at Penn	Franklin Field; Philadelphia, PA	W 28–0	12,993	
October 12	Brown	Memorial Field; Hanover, NH	W 14–7	12,500	
October 19	Holy Cross*	Memorial Field; Hanover, NH	W 13–8	13,909	
October 26	at Harvard	Harvard Stadium; Boston, MA (rivalry)	L 13–17	38,000	
November 2	at Yale	Yale Bowl; New Haven, CT	L 6–10	32,926	
November 9	at Columbia	Baker Field; New York, NY	W 47–6	16,349	
November 16	Cornell	Memorial Field; Hanover, NH (rivalry)	W 12–7	12,000	
November 30^	at Princeton	Palmer Stadium; Princeton, NJ	W 22–21	35,000	
*Non-conference game; ^Postponed from November 23 after the assassination of John F. Kennedy
