= 1965 Delaware Fightin' Blue Hens football team =

American college football season

1965 Delaware Fightin' Blue Hens football
- Conference: Middle Atlantic Conference
- University Division
- Record: 5–4 (3–3 MAC)
- Head coach: David M. Nelson (15th season)
- Captain: James Mueller
- Home stadium: Delaware Stadium

1965 Middle Atlantic Conference football standings
	Conf.					Overall
Team	W		L		T	W		L		T
University Division
Bucknell x	5	–	1	–	0	6	–	3	–	0
Hofstra	4	–	1	–	0	8	–	2	–	0
Temple	3	–	2	–	0	5	–	5	–	0
Delaware	3	–	3	–	0	5	–	4	–	0
Gettysburg	2	–	4	–	0	5	–	4	–	0
Lehigh	1	–	3	–	0	1	–	8	–	0
Lafayette	1	–	5	–	0	3	–	7	–	0
Northern College Division
Wilkes x	6	–	1	–	0	7	–	1	–	0
Upsala	5	–	2	–	0	5	–	3	–	0
Lycoming	4	–	2	–	0	5	–	3	–	0
Juniata	3	–	2	–	0	3	–	5	–	0
Moravian	4	–	4	–	0	5	–	4	–	0
Albright	3	–	4	–	0	4	–	5	–	0
Wagner	2	–	3	–	0	3	–	6	–	0
Susquehanna *	0	–	3	–	0	0	–	9	–	0
Southern College Division
Swarthmore x	6	–	0	–	0	6	–	1	–	0
Dickinson	7	–	1	–	0	7	–	1	–	0
Drexel	4	–	2	–	0	6	–	2	–	0
Lebanon Valley	4	–	3	–	0	5	–	3	–	0
Franklin & Marshall	3	–	4	–	0	4	–	4	–	0
Haverford	2	–	3	–	0	2	–	5	–	0
Western Maryland	2	–	4	–	0	3	–	6	–	0
Pennsylvania Military	2	–	6	–	0	2	–	7	–	0
Muhlenberg	1	–	8	–	0	1	–	8	–	0
Johns Hopkins	1	–	4	–	1	1	–	6	–	1
Ursinus	1	–	4	–	1	1	–	6	–	1
West Chester *	0	–	0	–	0	5	–	3	–	0
x – Division champion/co-champions; * – Ineligible for championship due to insufficient conference games

The 1965 Delaware Fightin' Blue Hens football team was an American football team that represented the University of Delaware in the Middle Atlantic Conference during the 1965 NCAA College Division football season. In its 15th and final season under head coach David M. Nelson, the team compiled a 5–4 record (3–3 against MAC opponents) and outscored opponents by a total of 213 to 152. James Mueller was the team captain. The team played its home games at Delaware Stadium in Newark, Delaware.

== Schedule ==
Date	Opponent	Site	Result	Attendance	Source
September 25	at Hofstra	Hofstra Stadium; Hempstead, NY	L 6–17	4,500	
October 2	Gettysburg	Delaware Stadium; Newark, DE	W 15–0	11,303–11,309	
October 9	at Lafayette	Fisher Field; Easton, PA	W 40–7	4,000	
October 16	Villanova*	Delaware Stadium; Newark, DE (rivalry)	W 24–21	12,288–12,388	
October 23	at Lehigh	Taylor Stadium; Bethlehem, PA (rivalry)	W 42–21	6,000	
October 30	at Temple	Temple Stadium; Philadelphia, PA	L 22–31	9,000	
November 6	Buffalo*	Delaware Stadium; Newark, DE	L 0–22	10,401	
November 13	Boston University*	Delaware Stadium; Newark, DE	W 50–7	7,800–7,874	
November 20	at Bucknell	Memorial Stadium; Lewisburg, PA	L 14–26	7,700	
*Non-conference game
