= 1963 Penn Quakers football team =

American college football season

1963 Penn Quakers football
- Conference: Ivy League
- Record: 3–6 (1–6 Ivy)
- Head coach: John Stiegman (4th season)
- Captain: Fred Jaffin
- Home stadium: Franklin Field

1963 Ivy League football standings
	Conf.					Overall
Team	W		L		T	W		L		T
Dartmouth +	5	–	2	–	0	7	–	2	–	0
Princeton +	5	–	2	–	0	7	–	2	–	0
Harvard	4	–	2	–	1	5	–	2	–	2
Yale	4	–	3	–	0	6	–	3	–	0
Cornell	4	–	3	–	0	5	–	4	–	0
Columbia	2	–	4	–	1	4	–	4	–	1
Brown	2	–	5	–	0	3	–	5	–	0
Penn	1	–	6	–	0	3	–	6	–	0
+ – Conference co-champions

The 1963 Penn Quakers football team was an American football team that represented the University of Pennsylvania during the 1963 NCAA University Division football season. Penn finished last in the Ivy League.

In its fourth year under head coach John Stiegman, this team compiled a 3–6 record and was outscored 189 to 97. Fred Jaffin was the team captain.

Penn's 1–6 conference record was the worst in the Ivy League. The Quakers were outscored 183 to 43 by Ivy opponents.

Penn played its home games at Franklin Field adjacent to the university's campus in Philadelphia, Pennsylvania.

== Schedule ==
Date	Opponent	Site	Result	Attendance	Source
September 28	Lafayette*	Franklin Field; Philadelphia, PA	W 47–0	9,357	
October 5	Dartmouth	Franklin Field; Philadelphia, PA	L 0–28	12,993	
October 12	at Princeton	Palmer Stadium; Princeton, NJ (rivalry)	L 0–34	28,000	
October 19	at Brown	Brown Stadium; Providence, RI	L 13–41	15,000	
October 26	Rutgers*	Franklin Field; Philadelphia, PA	W 7–6	9,846	
November 2	Harvard	Franklin Field; Philadelphia, PA (rivalry)	W 7–2	11,144	
November 9	Yale	Franklin Field; Philadelphia, PA	L 7–28	14,205	
November 16	at Columbia	Baker Field; New York, NY	L 8–33	11,642	
November 28^	Cornell	Franklin Field; Philadelphia, PA (rivalry)	L 8–17	8,794	
*Non-conference game; ^Postponed from November 23 after the assassination of John F. Kennedy
