= 1965 Rutgers Scarlet Knights football team =

American college football season

1965 Rutgers Scarlet Knights football

Middle Three co-champion
- Conference: Middle Three Conference
- Record: 3–6 (1–1 Middle Three)
- Head coach: John F. Bateman (6th season)
- Captain: Peter Savidge
- Home stadium: Rutgers Stadium

1965 Middle Three Conference football standings
	Conf.					Overall
Team	W		L		T	W		L		T
Rutgers +	1	–	1	–	0	3	–	6	–	0
Lafayette +	1	–	1	–	0	3	–	7	–	0
Lehigh +	1	–	1	–	0	1	–	8	–	0
+ – Conference co-champions

The 1965 Rutgers Scarlet Knights football team represented Rutgers University in the 1965 NCAA University Division football season. In their sixth season under head coach John F. Bateman, the Scarlet Knights compiled a 3–6 record, were co-champions of the Middle Three Conference championship, and were outscored by their opponents 152 to 84. The team's statistical leaders included Jack Callaghan with 456 passing yards, Rich Capria with 242 rushing yards, and Charley Mudie with 243 receiving yards.

The Scarlet Knights played their home games at Rutgers Stadium in Piscataway, New Jersey, across the river from the university's main campus in New Brunswick.

== Schedule ==
Date	Opponent	Site	Result	Attendance	Source
September 25	at Princeton*	Palmer Stadium; Princeton, NJ (rivalry)	L 6–32	40,000	
October 2	at Connecticut*	Memorial Stadium; Storrs, CT	W 17–8	10,629	
October 9	Lehigh	Rutgers Stadium; Piscataway, NJ	W 6–0	12,800	
October 16	at Army*	Michie Stadium; West Point, NY	L 6–23	31,000	
October 23	Columbia*	Rutgers Stadium; Piscataway, NJ	L 7–12	18,000	
October 30	at Boston University*	Nickerson Field; Boston, MA	L 0–30	11,000	
November 6	at Lafayette	Fisher Field; Easton, PA	L 18–23	5,000	
November 13	Holy Cross*	Rutgers Stadium; Piscataway, NJ	W 14–0	9,000	
November 20	Colgate*	Rutgers Stadium; Piscataway, NJ	L 10–24	13,300	
*Non-conference game
