= 1963 Lafayette Leopards football team =

American college football season

1963 Lafayette Leopards football
- Conference: Middle Atlantic Conference
- University Division
- Record: 1–8 (1–4 MAC)
- Head coach: Kenneth Bunn (1st season)
- Captains: John Brown; Richard Zanewicz
- Home stadium: Fisher Field

1963 Middle Atlantic Conference football standings
	Conf.					Overall
Team	W		L		T	W		L		T
University Division
No. 2 Delaware x	4	–	0	–	0	8	–	0	–	0
Bucknell	3	–	1	–	0	6	–	3	–	0
Gettysburg	2	–	2	–	0	5	–	4	–	0
Temple	1	–	2	–	0	5	–	3	–	1
Lehigh	1	–	3	–	0	1	–	8	–	0
Lafayette	1	–	4	–	0	1	–	8	–	0
Northern College Division
Upsala x	4	–	1	–	0	6	–	2	–	0
Wagner	4	–	1	–	0	6	–	3	–	0
Albright	2	–	3	–	0	3	–	5	–	0
Moravian	2	–	4	–	0	2	–	4	–	0
Wilkes	2	–	5	–	0	3	–	5	–	0
Lycoming	1	–	5	–	0	1	–	7	–	0
Juniata *	3	–	1	–	0	5	–	3	–	0
Susquehanna *	2	–	1	–	0	8	–	1	–	0
Hofstra *	0	–	0	–	0	3	–	6	–	0
Southern College Division
Western Maryland x	4	–	0	–	0	6	–	1	–	1
Muhlenberg	4	–	1	–	0	5	–	3	–	0
Dickinson	5	–	2	–	0	5	–	2	–	0
Swarthmore	4	–	2	–	0	4	–	3	–	0
Drexel	3	–	2	–	0	5	–	3	–	0
Lebanon Valley	4	–	3	–	0	4	–	3	–	0
Pennsylvania Military	3	–	5	–	0	3	–	6	–	0
Ursinus	2	–	4	–	1	2	–	4	–	1
Haverford	2	–	4	–	0	2	–	5	–	0
Franklin & Marshall	1	–	4	–	0	1	–	6	–	0
Johns Hopkins	0	–	4	–	1	0	–	6	–	1
West Chester *	0	–	0	–	0	7	–	1	–	0
x – Division champion/co-champions; * – Ineligible for championship due to insufficient conference games; Rankings from AP Poll

The 1963 Lafayette Leopards football team was an American football team that represented Lafayette College during the 1963 NCAA College Division football season. Lafayette finished last in the Middle Atlantic Conference, University Division, and last in the Middle Three Conference.

In their first year under head coach Kenneth Bunn, the Leopards compiled a 1–8 record. John Brown and Richard Zanewicz were the team captains.

In conference play, Lafayette's 1–4 record against MAC University Division opponents represented the worst winning percentage in the six-team circuit; Lehigh finished a half-game ahead in the standings with a 1–3 record. The Leopards were swept by their Middle Three rivals, losing to both Lehigh and Rutgers.

The season-ending rivalry game against Lehigh was originally slated for November 23, but postponed following the assassination of John F. Kennedy the previous day. The November 30 makeup date was the latest in the year that the 99-year traditional matchup had ever been held.

Lafayette played its home games at Fisher Field on College Hill in Easton, Pennsylvania.

== Schedule ==
Date	Opponent	Site	Result	Attendance	Source
September 28	at Penn*	Franklin Field; Philadelphia, PA	L 0–47	9,357	
October 5	at Muhlenberg*	Muhlenberg Field; Allentown, PA	L 7–18	4,000	
October 12	No. 3 Delaware	Fisher Field; Easton, PA	L 0–61	4,000	
October 19	at Temple	Temple Stadium; Philadelphia, PA	L 0–31	9,000	
October 26	Bucknell	Fisher Field; Easton, PA	W 14–13	5,500	
November 2	at Gettysburg	Memorial Field; Gettysburg, PA	L 12–14	5,100	
November 9	Rutgers	Fisher Field; Easton, PA	L 0–49	6,000	
November 16	Tufts*	Fisher Field; Easton, PA	L 13–25	3,500	
November 30^	at Lehigh	Taylor Stadium; Bethlehem, PA (The Rivalry)	L 6–13	7,000–7,500	
*Non-conference game; ^Postponed from November 23 after the assassination of John F. Kennedy; Rankings from UPI Poll released prior to the game
