= 1963 Lehigh Engineers football team =

American college football season

1963 Lehigh Engineers football
- Conference: Middle Atlantic Conference
- University Division
- Record: 1–8 (1–3 MAC)
- Head coach: Mike Cooley (2nd season)
- Captain: Jake LaMotta
- Home stadium: Taylor Stadium

1963 Middle Atlantic Conference football standings
	Conf.					Overall
Team	W		L		T	W		L		T
University Division
No. 2 Delaware x	4	–	0	–	0	8	–	0	–	0
Bucknell	3	–	1	–	0	6	–	3	–	0
Gettysburg	2	–	2	–	0	5	–	4	–	0
Temple	1	–	2	–	0	5	–	3	–	1
Lehigh	1	–	3	–	0	1	–	8	–	0
Lafayette	1	–	4	–	0	1	–	8	–	0
Northern College Division
Upsala x	4	–	1	–	0	6	–	2	–	0
Wagner	4	–	1	–	0	6	–	3	–	0
Albright	2	–	3	–	0	3	–	5	–	0
Moravian	2	–	4	–	0	2	–	4	–	0
Wilkes	2	–	5	–	0	3	–	5	–	0
Lycoming	1	–	5	–	0	1	–	7	–	0
Juniata *	3	–	1	–	0	5	–	3	–	0
Susquehanna *	2	–	1	–	0	8	–	1	–	0
Hofstra *	0	–	0	–	0	3	–	6	–	0
Southern College Division
Western Maryland x	4	–	0	–	0	6	–	1	–	1
Muhlenberg	4	–	1	–	0	5	–	3	–	0
Dickinson	5	–	2	–	0	5	–	2	–	0
Swarthmore	4	–	2	–	0	4	–	3	–	0
Drexel	3	–	2	–	0	5	–	3	–	0
Lebanon Valley	4	–	3	–	0	4	–	3	–	0
Pennsylvania Military	3	–	5	–	0	3	–	6	–	0
Ursinus	2	–	4	–	1	2	–	4	–	1
Haverford	2	–	4	–	0	2	–	5	–	0
Franklin & Marshall	1	–	4	–	0	1	–	6	–	0
Johns Hopkins	0	–	4	–	1	0	–	6	–	1
West Chester *	0	–	0	–	0	7	–	1	–	0
x – Division champion/co-champions; * – Ineligible for championship due to insufficient conference games; Rankings from AP Poll

The 1963 Lehigh Engineers football team was an American football team that represented Lehigh University during the 1963 NCAA College Division football season. Lehigh finished second-to-last in both the Middle Atlantic Conference, University Division, and the Middle Three Conference.

In their second year under head coach Mike Cooley, the Engineers compiled a 1–8 record. Jake LaMotta was the team captain.

In conference play, Lehigh's 1–3 record against opponents in the MAC University Division represented the fifth-best winning percentage in the six-team circuit, half a game ahead of Lafayette's 1–4. The Engineers went 1–1 against the Middle Three, losing to Rutgers and beating Lafayette.

The season-ending rivalry game against Lafayette was originally slated for November 23, but postponed following the assassination of John F. Kennedy the previous day. The November 30 makeup date was the latest in the year that the 99-year traditional matchup had ever been held.

Lehigh played its home games at Taylor Stadium on the university campus in Bethlehem, Pennsylvania.

== Schedule ==
Date	Opponent	Site	Result	Attendance	Source
September 28	at Delaware	Delaware Stadium; Newark, DE (rivalry)	L 0–30	9,364	
October 5	at Cornell*	Schoellkopf Field; Ithaca, NY	L 0–24	10,000	
October 12	Gettysburg	Taylor Stadium; Bethlehem, PA	L 20–24	9,000	
October 19	at Rutgers	Rutgers Stadium; Piscataway, NJ	L 6–30	16,000	
October 26	at Columbia*	Baker Field; New York, NY	L 21–42	8,273	
November 2	Colgate*	Taylor Stadium; Bethlehem, PA	L 6–20	7,000	
November 9	at Davidson*	Richardson Stadium; Davidson, NC	L 3–7	6,000	
November 16	at Bucknell	Memorial Stadium; Lewisburg, PA	L 12–34	2,200–3,000	
November 30^	Lafayette	Taylor Stadium; Bethlehem, PA (The Rivalry)	W 15–8	7,000–7,500	
*Non-conference game; ^Postponed from November 23 after the assassination of John F. Kennedy
