= 1965 Dartmouth Indians football team =

American college football season

1965 Dartmouth Indians football

Ivy League champion Lambert-Meadowlands Trophy
- Conference: Ivy League
- Record: 9–0 (7–0 Ivy)
- Head coach: Bob Blackman
- Home stadium: Memorial Field

1965 Ivy League football standings
	Conf.					Overall
Team	W		L		T	W		L		T
Dartmouth $	7	–	0	–	0	9	–	0	–	0
Princeton	6	–	1	–	0	8	–	1	–	0
Harvard	3	–	2	–	2	5	–	2	–	2
Cornell	3	–	3	–	1	4	–	3	–	2
Yale	3	–	4	–	0	3	–	6	–	0
Penn	2	–	4	–	1	4	–	4	–	1
Brown	1	–	6	–	0	2	–	7	–	0
Columbia	1	–	6	–	0	2	–	7	–	0
$ – Conference champion

The 1965 Dartmouth Indians football team represented Dartmouth College during the 1965 NCAA University Division football season. The Indians were led by 11th-year head coach Bob Blackman and played their home games at Memorial Field in Hanover, New Hampshire. They finished with a perfect record of 9–0, winning the Ivy League title and the Lambert-Meadowlands Trophy, which signified them as champions of the East.

Tom Clarke was captain of Dartmouth’s first Lambert Trophy team as well as the All Ivy defensive end.

== Schedule ==
Date	Opponent	Site	Result	Attendance	Source
September 25	New Hampshire*	Memorial Field; Hanover, NH (rivalry)	W 56–6	10,000	
October 2	at Holy Cross*	Fitton Field; Worcester, MA	W 27–6	20,000	
October 9	Penn	Memorial Field; Hanover, NH	W 24–19	13,909	
October 16	at Brown	Brown Stadium; Providence, RI	W 35–9	12,800	
October 23	at Harvard	Harvard Stadium; Boston, MA (rivalry)	W 14–0	39,000	
October 30	at Yale	Yale Bowl; New Haven, CT	W 20–17	39,549	
November 6	at Columbia	Baker Field; New York, NY	W 47–0	15,269	
November 13	Cornell	Memorial Field; Hanover, NH (rivalry)	W 20–0	12,000	
November 20	at Princeton	Palmer Stadium; Princeton, NJ	W 28–14	45,725	
*Non-conference game
