= 1963 Princeton Tigers football team =

American college football season

1963 Princeton Tigers football

Ivy League co-champion
- Conference: Ivy League
- Record: 7–2 (5–2 Ivy)
- Head coach: Dick Colman (7th season)
- Captain: William E. Guedel
- Home stadium: Palmer Stadium

1963 Ivy League football standings
	Conf.					Overall
Team	W		L		T	W		L		T
Dartmouth +	5	–	2	–	0	7	–	2	–	0
Princeton +	5	–	2	–	0	7	–	2	–	0
Harvard	4	–	2	–	1	5	–	2	–	2
Yale	4	–	3	–	0	6	–	3	–	0
Cornell	4	–	3	–	0	5	–	4	–	0
Columbia	2	–	4	–	1	4	–	4	–	1
Brown	2	–	5	–	0	3	–	5	–	0
Penn	1	–	6	–	0	3	–	6	–	0
+ – Conference co-champions

The 1963 Princeton Tigers football team was an American football team that represented Princeton University during the 1963 NCAA University Division football season. Princeton was co-champion of the Ivy League.

In their seventh year under head coach Dick Colman, the Tigers compiled a 7–2 record and outscored opponents 247 to 83. William E. Guedel was the team captain.

Princeton's 5–2 conference record tied for best in the Ivy League standings and earned a share of the league championship, even though Princeton had lost to the other co-champion, Dartmouth. The Tigers outscored Ivy opponents 181 to 83.

Princeton played its home games at Palmer Stadium on the university campus in Princeton, New Jersey.

== Schedule ==
Date	Opponent	Site	Result	Attendance	Source
September 28	Rutgers*	Palmer Stadium; Princeton, NJ (rivalry)	W 24–0	40,000	
October 5	at Columbia	Baker Field; New York, NY	W 7–6	29,048	
October 12	Penn	Palmer Stadium; Princeton, NJ (rivalry)	W 34–0	28,000	
October 19	Colgate*	Palmer Stadium; Princeton, NJ	W 42–0	22,500	
October 26	Cornell	Palmer Stadium; Princeton, NJ	W 51–14	28,000	
November 2	Brown	Palmer Stadium; Princeton, NJ	W 34–13	15,000	
November 9	at Harvard	Harvard Stadium; Boston, MA (rivalry)	L 7–21	25,000	
November 16	Yale	Palmer Stadium; Princeton, NJ (rivalry)	W 27–7	42,000	
November 30^	Dartmouth	Palmer Stadium; Princeton, NJ	L 21–22	35,000	
*Non-conference game; ^Postponed from November 23 after the assassination of John F. Kennedy
