= Jack Zilly =

American football player (1921–2009)

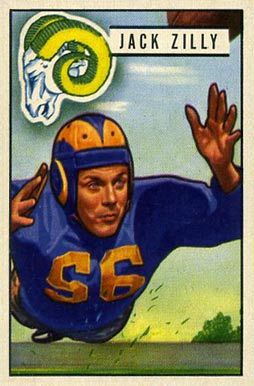

No. 42, 56, 88
- Positions: End, defensive end

Personal information
- Born: November 11, 1921; Waterbury, Connecticut, U.S.
- Died: December 18, 2009 (aged 88); Narragansett, Rhode Island, U.S.
- Listed height: 6 ft 2 in (1.88 m)
- Listed weight: 212 lb (96 kg)

Career information
- High school: Lewis (Southington, Connecticut); Cheshire Academy (Cheshire, Connecticut)
- College: Notre Dame (1941-1943, 1946)
- NFL draft: 1945: 4th round, 32nd overall pick

Career history

Playing
- Los Angeles Rams (1947–1951); Philadelphia Eagles (1952)

Coaching
- Montana State (1955) Freshman coach; Notre Dame (1956–1958) Ends coach; Brown (1959–1962) Ends coach; Rhode Island (1963–1969) Head coach; Philadelphia Eagles (1970–1971) Special teams coordinator & running backs coach; Hamilton Tiger-Cats (1972–1975) Assistant coach

Awards and highlights
- NFL champion (1951); 2× National champion (1943, 1946); Grey Cup champion (1972)

Career NFL statistics
- Receptions: 23
- Receiving yards: 279
- Touchdowns: 4
- Stats at Pro Football Reference

Head coaching record
- Career: 21–41–2 (.344)

John Lynus Zilly (November 11, 1921 – December 18, 2009) was an American professional football player and coach who was an end for six seasons with the Los Angeles Rams and the Philadelphia Eagles of the National Football League (NFL). He played college football for the Notre Dame Fighting Irish.

== Playing ==
Zilly played right end at the University of Notre Dame on their national championship team in 1943. During World War II, he served two years in the Navy, fighting in the Pacific. After the war, he returned to Notre Dame to help guide that team to another national championship in 1946. While Zilly was a sixth round draft pick for the San Francisco 49ers of the All-America Football Conference, he did not play for that team. Instead as a fourth round draft pick for the then-Cleveland Rams in 1945, he played six seasons in the NFL for the Los Angeles Rams and the 1952 Eagles. While in California, Zilly also appeared in five movies, the best-known being Twelve O'Clock High.

== Coaching ==
In 1955, Zilly was named varsity baseball and freshman football and basketball coach at Montana State. He returned to his alma mater in 1956 as an assistant under Terry Brennan, then joined the coaching staff at Brown in 1959. From 1963 to 1969, Zilly was the head coach at Rhode Island. He compiled a 21-41-2 record, with his only winning season coming in 1967. In 1970, he became the running backs coach for the Philadelphia Eagles. In 1972, Eagles head coach Jerry Williams was hired by the Hamilton Tiger-Cats of the Canadian Football League and Zilly joined him as an assistant.

On January 8, 1978, Zilly coached the American team to a 22–7 victory over Canada in the first-ever Can-Am Bowl, at Tampa Stadium. His 1978 team consisted of future University of South Florida head coach Jim Leavitt and future Tampa Bay Buccaneers and Washington Redskins general manager, Bruce Allen.

== Later life ==
After leaving football, Zilly owned and ran a successful real-estate company until his retirement.

Zilly died on December 18, 2009, in Narragansett, Rhode Island.

== Head coaching record ==
Year	Team	Overall	Conference	Standing	Bowl/playoffs
Rhode Island Rams (Yankee Conference) (1963–1969)
1963	Rhode Island	4–5	2–3	3rd	
1964	Rhode Island	3–7	1–4	5th	
1965	Rhode Island	2–7	1–4	5th	
1966	Rhode Island	1–7–1	1–3–1	5th	
1967	Rhode Island	6–2–1	2–2–1	3rd	
1968	Rhode Island	3–6	2–3	T–3rd	
1969	Rhode Island	2–7	1–4	T–15th	
Rhode Island:		21–41–2	10–23–2		
Total:		21–41–2			
