= 1965 Temple Owls football team =

American college football season

1965 Temple Owls football
- Conference: Middle Atlantic Conference
- University Division
- Record: 5–5 (3–2 MAC)
- Head coach: George Makris (6th season)
- Captain: Game captains
- Home stadium: Temple Stadium

1965 Middle Atlantic Conference football standings
	Conf.					Overall
Team	W		L		T	W		L		T
University Division
Bucknell x	5	–	1	–	0	6	–	3	–	0
Hofstra	4	–	1	–	0	8	–	2	–	0
Temple	3	–	2	–	0	5	–	5	–	0
Delaware	3	–	3	–	0	5	–	4	–	0
Gettysburg	2	–	4	–	0	5	–	4	–	0
Lehigh	1	–	3	–	0	1	–	8	–	0
Lafayette	1	–	5	–	0	3	–	7	–	0
Northern College Division
Wilkes x	6	–	1	–	0	7	–	1	–	0
Upsala	5	–	2	–	0	5	–	3	–	0
Lycoming	4	–	2	–	0	5	–	3	–	0
Juniata	3	–	2	–	0	3	–	5	–	0
Moravian	4	–	4	–	0	5	–	4	–	0
Albright	3	–	4	–	0	4	–	5	–	0
Wagner	2	–	3	–	0	3	–	6	–	0
Susquehanna *	0	–	3	–	0	0	–	9	–	0
Southern College Division
Swarthmore x	6	–	0	–	0	6	–	1	–	0
Dickinson	7	–	1	–	0	7	–	1	–	0
Drexel	4	–	2	–	0	6	–	2	–	0
Lebanon Valley	4	–	3	–	0	5	–	3	–	0
Franklin & Marshall	3	–	4	–	0	4	–	4	–	0
Haverford	2	–	3	–	0	2	–	5	–	0
Western Maryland	2	–	4	–	0	3	–	6	–	0
Pennsylvania Military	2	–	6	–	0	2	–	7	–	0
Muhlenberg	1	–	8	–	0	1	–	8	–	0
Johns Hopkins	1	–	4	–	1	1	–	6	–	1
Ursinus	1	–	4	–	1	1	–	6	–	1
West Chester *	0	–	0	–	0	5	–	3	–	0
x – Division champion/co-champions; * – Ineligible for championship due to insufficient conference games

The 1965 Temple Owls football team was an American football team that represented Temple University as a member of the Middle Atlantic Conference during the 1965 NCAA College Division football season. In its sixth season under head coach George Makris, the team compiled a 5–5 record (3–2 against MAC opponents). The team played its home games at Temple Stadium in Philadelphia.

== Schedule ==
Date	Opponent	Site	Result	Attendance	Source
September 18	George Washington*	Temple Stadium; Philadelphia, PA	L 13–21	10,200	
September 25	at Merchant Marine*	Tomb Field; Kings Point, NY	L 21–27	3,500	
October 2	Boston University*	Temple Stadium; Philadelphia, PA	L 7–14	7,000–7,500	
October 9	at Bucknell	Memorial Stadium; Lewisburg, PA	L 14–40	7,500	
October 16	Lafayette	Temple Stadium; Philadelphia, PA	W 27–12	5,500	
October 23	at Connecticut*	Memorial Stadium; Storrs, CT	W 12–11	7,048	
October 30	Delaware^{†}	Temple Stadium; Philadelphia, PA	W 31–22	9,000	
November 6	Rhode Island*	Temple Stadium; Philadelphia, PA	W 28–0	5,500	
November 13	Gettysburg	Temple Stadium; Philadelphia, PA	W 22–21	5,000	
November 20	Hofstra	Temple Stadium; Philadelphia, PA	L 28–42	4,000	
*Non-conference game; ^{†}Homecoming
