= 1963 Columbia Lions football team =

American college football season

1963 Columbia Lions football
- Conference: Ivy League
- Record: 4–4–1 (2–4–1 Ivy)
- Head coach: Aldo Donelli (7th season)
- Captain: Allison F. Butts
- Home stadium: Baker Field

1963 Ivy League football standings
	Conf.					Overall
Team	W		L		T	W		L		T
Dartmouth +	5	–	2	–	0	7	–	2	–	0
Princeton +	5	–	2	–	0	7	–	2	–	0
Harvard	4	–	2	–	1	5	–	2	–	2
Yale	4	–	3	–	0	6	–	3	–	0
Cornell	4	–	3	–	0	5	–	4	–	0
Columbia	2	–	4	–	1	4	–	4	–	1
Brown	2	–	5	–	0	3	–	5	–	0
Penn	1	–	6	–	0	3	–	6	–	0
+ – Conference co-champions

The 1963 Columbia Lions football team was an American football team that represented Columbia University during the 1963 NCAA University Division football season. Columbia finished sixth in the Ivy League.

In their seventh season under head coach Aldo "Buff" Donelli, the Lions compiled a 4–4–1 record and outscored opponents 190 to 165. Allison F. Butts was the team captain.

The Lions' 2–4–1 conference record placed sixth in the Ivy League standings. Columbia was outscored 116 to 113 by Ivy opponents.

Columbia played its home games at Baker Field in Upper Manhattan, in New York City.

== Schedule ==
Date	Opponent	Site	Result	Attendance	Source
September 28	at Brown	Brown Stadium; Providence, RI	W 41–14	7,700	
October 5	Princeton	Baker Field; New York, NY	L 6–7	29,048	
October 12	at Yale	Yale Bowl; New Haven, CT	L 7–19	28,507	
October 19	at Harvard	Harvard Stadium; Boston, MA	T 3–3	15,000	
October 26	Lehigh*^{†}	Baker Field; New York, NY	W 42–21	8,273	
November 2	at Cornell	Schoellkopf Field; Ithaca, NY (rivalry)	L 17–18	13,000	
November 9	Dartmouth	Baker Field; New York, NY	L 6–47	16,349	
November 16	Penn	Baker Field; New York, NY	W 33–8	11,642	
November 28^	at Rutgers*	Rutgers Stadium; Piscataway, NJ	W 35–28	5,000	
*Non-conference game; ^{†}Homecoming; ^Postponed from November 23 after the assassination of John F. Kennedy
