= 1963 Cornell Big Red football team =

American college football season

1963 Cornell Big Red football
- Conference: Ivy League
- Record: 5–4 (4–3 Ivy)
- Head coach: Tom Harp (3rd season)
- Captain: Gary Wood
- Home stadium: Schoellkopf Field

1963 Ivy League football standings
| | Conf. | | | | | Overall |
| Team | W | | L | | T | W | | L | | T |
|---|---|---|---|---|---|---|---|---|---|---|
| Dartmouth + | 5 | – | 2 | – | 0 | 7 | – | 2 | – | 0 |
| Princeton + | 5 | – | 2 | – | 0 | 7 | – | 2 | – | 0 |
| Harvard | 4 | – | 2 | – | 1 | 5 | – | 2 | – | 2 |
| Yale | 4 | – | 3 | – | 0 | 6 | – | 3 | – | 0 |
| Cornell | 4 | – | 3 | – | 0 | 5 | – | 4 | – | 0 |
| Columbia | 2 | – | 4 | – | 1 | 4 | – | 4 | – | 1 |
| Brown | 2 | – | 5 | – | 0 | 3 | – | 5 | – | 0 |
| Penn | 1 | – | 6 | – | 0 | 3 | – | 6 | – | 0 |
+ – Conference co-champions

The 1963 Cornell Big Red football team was an American football team that represented Cornell University during the 1963 NCAA University Division football season. Cornell tied for fourth in the Ivy League .

In its third season under head coach Tom Harp, the team compiled a 5–4 record but was outscored 165 to 152. Gary Wood was the team captain.

Cornell's 4–3 conference record tied for fourth place in the Ivy League standings. The Big Red were outscored 144 to 111 by Ivy opponents.

Cornell played its home games at Schoellkopf Field in Ithaca, New York.

== Schedule ==
| Date | Opponent | Site | Result | Attendance | Source |
|---|---|---|---|---|---|
| September 28 | Colgate* | Schoellkopf Field; Ithaca, NY (rivalry) | L 17–21 | 21,000 | |
| October 5 | Lehigh* | Schoellkopf Field; Ithaca, NY | W 24–0 | 10,000 | |
| October 12 | at Harvard | Harvard Stadium; Boston, MA | L 14–21 | 16,500 | |
| October 19 | Yale | Schoellkopf Field; Ithaca, NY | W 13–10 | 21,000 | |
| October 26 | at Princeton | Palmer Stadium; Princeton, NJ | L 14–51 | 28,000 | |
| November 2 | Columbia | Schoellkopf Field; Ithaca, NY (rivalry) | W 18–17 | 13,000 | |
| November 9 | Brown | Schoellkopf Field; Ithaca, NY | W 28–25 | 10,000 | |
| November 16 | at Dartmouth | Memorial Field; Hanover, NH (rivalry) | L 7–12 | 12,000 | |
| November 28 | at Penn | Franklin Field; Philadelphia, PA (rivalry) | W 17–8 | 8,794 | |
*Non-conference game
