= 1965 Hofstra Flying Dutchmen football team =

American college football season

1965 Hofstra Flying Dutchmen football
- Conference: Middle Atlantic Conference
- University Division
- Record: 8–2 (4–1 MAC)
- Head coach: Howdy Myers (16th season)
- Captains: Henry Levin; Bill Starr
- Home stadium: Hofstra Stadium

1965 Middle Atlantic Conference football standings
	Conf.					Overall
Team	W		L		T	W		L		T
University Division
Bucknell x	5	–	1	–	0	6	–	3	–	0
Hofstra	4	–	1	–	0	8	–	2	–	0
Temple	3	–	2	–	0	5	–	5	–	0
Delaware	3	–	3	–	0	5	–	4	–	0
Gettysburg	2	–	4	–	0	5	–	4	–	0
Lehigh	1	–	3	–	0	1	–	8	–	0
Lafayette	1	–	5	–	0	3	–	7	–	0
Northern College Division
Wilkes x	6	–	1	–	0	7	–	1	–	0
Upsala	5	–	2	–	0	5	–	3	–	0
Lycoming	4	–	2	–	0	5	–	3	–	0
Juniata	3	–	2	–	0	3	–	5	–	0
Moravian	4	–	4	–	0	5	–	4	–	0
Albright	3	–	4	–	0	4	–	5	–	0
Wagner	2	–	3	–	0	3	–	6	–	0
Susquehanna *	0	–	3	–	0	0	–	9	–	0
Southern College Division
Swarthmore x	6	–	0	–	0	6	–	1	–	0
Dickinson	7	–	1	–	0	7	–	1	–	0
Drexel	4	–	2	–	0	6	–	2	–	0
Lebanon Valley	4	–	3	–	0	5	–	3	–	0
Franklin & Marshall	3	–	4	–	0	4	–	4	–	0
Haverford	2	–	3	–	0	2	–	5	–	0
Western Maryland	2	–	4	–	0	3	–	6	–	0
Pennsylvania Military	2	–	6	–	0	2	–	7	–	0
Muhlenberg	1	–	8	–	0	1	–	8	–	0
Johns Hopkins	1	–	4	–	1	1	–	6	–	1
Ursinus	1	–	4	–	1	1	–	6	–	1
West Chester *	0	–	0	–	0	5	–	3	–	0
x – Division champion/co-champions; * – Ineligible for championship due to insufficient conference games

The 1965 Hofstra Flying Dutchmen football team was an American football team that represented Hofstra University during the 1965 NCAA College Division football season. Hofstra finished second in the Middle Atlantic Conference, University Division.

In their 16th year under head coach Howard "Howdy" Myers Jr., the Flying Dutchmen compiled an 8–2 record, and outscored opponents 293 to 187. Henry Levin and Bill Starr were the team captains.

With a 4–1 conference record, Hofstra narrowly missed the MAC University Division championship, finishing half a game behind Bucknell (5–1).

The Flying Dutchmen played their home games at Hofstra Stadium on the university's Hempstead campus on Long Island, New York.

== Schedule ==
Date	Opponent	Rank	Site	Result	Attendance	Source
September 18	Gettysburg		Hofstra Stadium; Hempstead, NY	W 35–14	4,000–4,400	
September 25	Delaware		Hofstra Stadium; Hempstead, NY	W 17–6	4,000–4,500	
October 2	Lafayette	No. 10	Hofstra Stadium; Hempstead, NY	W 31–7	4,000–5,000	
October 9	Bridgeport*	No. 7	Hofstra Stadium; Hempstead, NY	W 50–28	3,800–4,500	
October 16	at Merchant Marine*	No. 6	Tomb Field; Kings Point, NY	W 35–13	5,500	
October 23	at Southern Connecticut*	No. 5	Jess Dow Field; New Haven, CT	L 21–24	3,000	
October 30	at Bucknell	No. 15	Memorial Stadium; Lewisburg, PA	L 6–33	6,000–9,250	
November 13	Wittenberg*		Hofstra Stadium; Hempstead, NY	W 27–14	3,500	
November 20	Temple		Hofstra Stadium; Hempstead, NY	W 42–28	4,000	
November 25	C.W. Post*		Hofstra Stadium; Hempstead, NY	W 29–20	7,500	
*Non-conference game; Rankings from UPI Poll released prior to the game
