= Novant Health Thanksgiving Day Parade =

Parade in Charlotte, North Carolina, US

The Novant Health Thanksgiving Day Parade

The Novant Health Thanksgiving Eve Parade, previously known as the "Novant Health Thanksgiving Day Parade" from 2013 until 2020, Carolinas' Carrousel Parade and in 2008 and 2009 as the Carolinas' Thanksgiving Day Parade, is a Thanksgiving Day parade held in uptown Charlotte, North Carolina, the night before Thanksgiving Day. The parade was founded in 1947, and in 2013 Novant Health became the parade's title sponsor, taking over sponsorship from Belk. It was moved from Thanksgiving Day to Thanksgiving Eve in 2021.

Starting in 1967, Carolina's Carrousel, Inc. has held a scholarship program for students recognizing those with outstanding academic achievements and community involvement. From 1998 to 2012 scholarships were also awarded to outstanding marching band students. The Carrousel Queen title was awarded to the high school senior girl with the top scholarship in the program; however, the title was changed to Carrousel Scholar in 2011.

Traditionally, Carolinas' Carrousel Parade was one of the few Thanksgiving Day parades held in the afternoon as opposed to the morning (although the first several parades were held in the evening). However, the parade was moved to mornings beginning in 2008. The parade is the largest gathering of Carolinians and has been named as the fourth-largest in the United States, with an estimated 100,000 spectators. The parade was also televised with tape-delay on WBTV. In 2016, it was streamed live on the station's web site. The live and delayed broadcasts moved to WCCB in 2023.

== History ==
=== Carrousel Parade ===
- 1947: The parade was founded by local businessmen to attract shoppers to uptown Charlotte and has since become a staple holiday event in uptown Charlotte.
- 1950: The parade moves to Thanksgiving Day.
- 1967: The impact of the parade continued with the creation of the scholarship program by Carolina's Carrousel, Inc. that awarded outstanding high school students in the region.
- 1968: CBS broadcasts the parade, which moves to the morning for this reason, as part of its Thanksgiving coverage.
- 1969: The route was reversed, starting at 11th Street and continuing down Tryon Street to East Morehead Street to South Boulevard, ending at East Boulevard, where it used to begin. This was done so people's faces could be shown without cameras pointing toward the sun.
- 1981: A marching band competition was added to the parade.
- 2005: The parade nearly doubled the number of floats to 23, and board members were hoping to find a way for the parade to be televised nationally.
- 2007: The light poles in uptown Charlotte prevented the parade from being able to support the large parade balloons. Therefore, to improve the parade, the 2007 event had 104 floats and entertainment such as dancers. In 2007 the parade also celebrated its 60th anniversary and the introduction of a new sponsor, Belk who then became the title sponsor in 2010.
- 2008: For the first time since 1968, the Parade started at 10 a.m. rather than in the afternoon (the earlier start time attracted a much larger television viewing audience than in past years and was deemed a huge success). Also in 2008, travelmuse.com named Charlotte's parade as the 4th largest in the nation.
- 2012: The U.S. News & World Report included the parade on its list of "America's Best Thanksgiving Day Parades."

=== Novant Health Parade ===
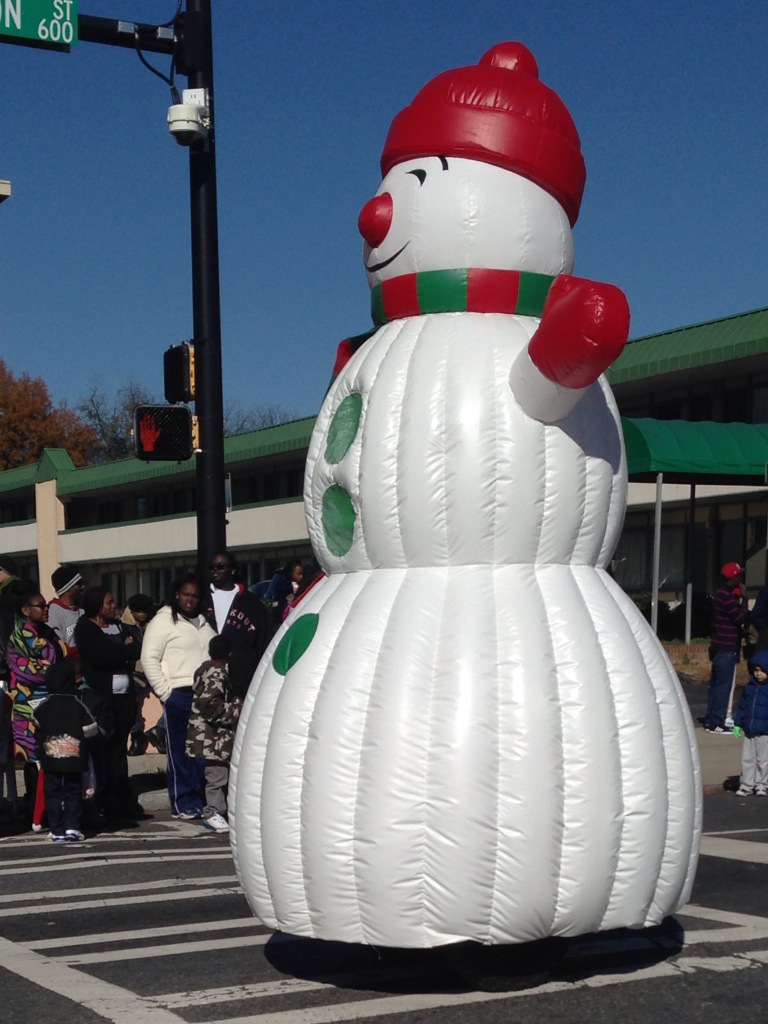
Snowman Segwaloon at 2013 Novant Health Thanksgiving Day Parade

In the summer of 2013, Carolinas Carrousel announced the parade would not happen that year after Belk was no longer the title sponsor; however, Novant Health took over as sponsor in August and the parade was able to continue as normal. Charlotte Center City Partners began producing the now Novant Health Thanksgiving Day Parade and brought new life to the annual parade.

The first Novant Health Thanksgiving Day Parade started at 9:30 and provided more live entertainment. In addition to Novant Health taking over as sponsor, the parade offered more live performances at Levine Center for the Arts. There was also the appearance of segwaloons, the creation of parade executive, Robert Krumbine. This creation is a cross between a Segway and a balloon and is unique to the Novant Health Thanksgiving Day Parade.

The 2013 parade also included 15 marching bands, 8 larger-than-life balloons, 15 floats, performers, sports organizations and community organizations and characters.

The 2014 parade was the first in many years to move northward, starting at Stonewall Street and ending at Ninth Street; Krumbine said this was the route the parade had to begin with. It included the song "Celebrate the Season" written by Rob Pottorf, and reserved seating for which tickets were sold.

The parade continued to move north until 2018, when it returned to moving south again.

With 2020 being cancelled on grounds of COVID-19 pandemic, CBS 3 aired a Best Of parade, plus virtual guests.

In 2021, the parade moved to 6 P.M. the night before Thanksgiving.
