= 1963 Brown Bears football team =

American college football season

1963 Brown Bears football
- Conference: Ivy League
- Record: 3–5 (2–5 Ivy)
- Head coach: John McLaughry (5th season)
- Captains: B. Bucci; A. Matteo
- Home stadium: Brown Stadium

1963 Ivy League football standings
	Conf.					Overall
Team	W		L		T	W		L		T
Dartmouth +	5	–	2	–	0	7	–	2	–	0
Princeton +	5	–	2	–	0	7	–	2	–	0
Harvard	4	–	2	–	1	5	–	2	–	2
Yale	4	–	3	–	0	6	–	3	–	0
Cornell	4	–	3	–	0	5	–	4	–	0
Columbia	2	–	4	–	1	4	–	4	–	1
Brown	2	–	5	–	0	3	–	5	–	0
Penn	1	–	6	–	0	3	–	6	–	0
+ – Conference co-champions

The 1963 Brown Bears football team was an American football team that represented Brown University during the 1963 NCAA University Division football season. Brown finished second-to-last in the Ivy League.

In their fifth season under head coach John McLaughry, the Bears compiled a 3–5 record and were outscored 168 to 157. B. Bucci and A. Matteo were the team captains. The team played eight games, rather than the usual nine, because the season-ender against Colgate was canceled following the assassination of John F. Kennedy.

The Bears' 2–5 conference record placed seventh in the Ivy League standings. They were outscored by Ivy opponents 161 to 124.

Brown played its home games at Brown Stadium in Providence, Rhode Island.

== Schedule ==
Date	Opponent	Site	Result	Attendance	Source
September 28	Columbia	Brown Stadium; Providence, RI	L 14–41	7,700	
October 5	at Yale	Yale Bowl; New Haven, CT	W 12–7	24,716	
October 12	at Dartmouth	Memorial Field; Hanover, NH	L 7–14	12,500	
October 19	Penn^{†}	Brown Stadium; Providence, RI	W 41–13	15,000	
October 26	Rhode Island*	Brown Stadium; Providence, RI (rivalry)	W 33–7	10,000–10,8000	
November 2	at Princeton	Palmer Stadium; Princeton, NJ	L 13–34	15,000	
November 9	at Cornell	Schoellkopf Field; Ithaca, NY	L 25–28	10,000	
November 16	Harvard	Brown Stadium; Providence, RI	L 12–24	16,000	
November 23	Colgate*	Brown Stadium; Providence, RI	Canceled		
*Non-conference game; ^{†}Homecoming
