= 1963 Rutgers Scarlet Knights football team =

American college football season

1963 Rutgers Scarlet Knights football

Middle Three champion
- Conference: Middle Three Conference
- Record: 3–6 (2–0 Middle Three)
- Head coach: John F. Bateman (4th season)
- Captain: Anton Hoeflinger
- Home stadium: Rutgers Stadium

1963 Middle Three Conference football standings
	Conf.					Overall
Team	W		L		T	W		L		T
Rutgers $	2	–	0	–	0	3	–	6	–	0
Lehigh	1	–	1	–	0	1	–	8	–	0
Lafayette	0	–	2	–	0	1	–	8	–	0
$ – Conference champion

The 1963 Rutgers Scarlet Knights football team was an American football team that represented Rutgers University in the 1963 NCAA University Division football season. Despite an overall losing record, Rutgers won the Middle Three Conference championship.

In their fourth season under head coach John F. Bateman, the Scarlet Knights compiled a 3–6 record and were outscored by their opponents 148 to 145. The team's statistical leaders included Dave Stout with 634 passing yards, Don Viggiano with 404 rushing yards, and Paul Strelick with 242 receiving yards.

The Scarlet Knights played their home games at Rutgers Stadium in Piscataway, New Jersey, near the university's main New Brunswick campus.

== Schedule ==
Date	Opponent	Site	Result	Attendance	Source
September 28	at Princeton*	Palmer Stadium; Princeton, NJ (rivalry)	L 0–24	40,000	
October 5	at Harvard*	Harvard Stadium; Boston, MA	L 0–28	12,500	
October 12	at Colgate*	Colgate Athletic Field; Hamilton, NY	L 8–28	9,000	
October 19	Lehigh^{†}	Rutgers Stadium; Piscataway, NJ	W 30–6	16,000	
October 26	at Penn*	Franklin Field; Philadelphia, PA	L 6–7	9,846	
November 2	Boston University*	Rutgers Stadium; Piscataway, NJ	W 21–6	12,000	
November 9	at Lafayette	Fisher Field; Easton, PA	W 49–0	6,000	
November 16	Delaware*	Rutgers Stadium; Piscataway, NJ	L 3–14	16,000–17,000	
November 28^	Columbia*	Rutgers Stadium; Piscataway, NJ	L 28–35	5,000	
*Non-conference game; ^{†}Homecoming; ^Postponed from November 23 after the assassination of John F. Kennedy
