= 1963 Connecticut Huskies football team =

American college football season

1963 Connecticut Huskies football
- Conference: Yankee Conference
- Record: 2–6 (1–3 Yankee)
- Head coach: Bob Ingalls (12th season)
- Home stadium: Memorial Stadium

1963 Yankee Conference football standings
	Conf.					Overall
Team	W		L		T	W		L		T
UMass $	5	–	0	–	0	8	–	0	–	1
Maine	3	–	2	–	0	5	–	3	–	0
Rhode Island	2	–	3	–	0	4	–	5	–	0
Vermont	2	–	2	–	0	6	–	2	–	0
Connecticut	1	–	3	–	0	2	–	6	–	0
New Hampshire	1	–	4	–	0	2	–	6	–	0
$ – Conference champion

The 1963 Connecticut Huskies football team represented the University of Connecticut in the 1963 NCAA College Division football season. The Huskies were led by 12th-year head coach Bob Ingalls, and completed the season with a record of 2–6.

== Schedule ==
Date	Opponent	Site	Result	Attendance	Source
September 28	at Yale*	Yale Bowl; New Haven, CT	L 0–3	30,610–30,614	
October 5	at Temple*	Temple Stadium; Philadelphia, PA	L 7–9	9,000	
October 12	UMass	Memorial Stadium; Storrs, CT (rivalry)	L 3–21	10,937	
October 19	at Maine	Alumni Field; Orono, ME	L 12–35	9,300	
October 26	No. 3 Delaware*	Memorial Stadium; Storrs, CT	L 14–26	8,087	
November 2	New Hampshire	Memorial Stadium; Storrs, CT	W 21–6	6,485	
November 9	at Boston University*	Nickerson Field; Boston, MA	W 22–0	1,500	
November 16	vs. Rhode Island	Providence City Stadium; Providence, RI (rivalry)	L 12–13	4,500–4,812	
November 23	Holy Cross	Memorial Stadium; Storrs, CT	Canceled		
*Non-conference game; Rankings from AP Poll released prior to the game
