= Paydirt Pete =

Mascot of the University of Texas at El Paso

- Team: Miners
- University: University of Texas at El Paso
- Conference: Mountain West
- Description: Caricature of a prospector
- Origin of name: Student vote
- First seen: 1974

UTEP's older version of Paydirt Pete, as seen from the UTEP locker room in Sun Bowl Stadium

Paydirt Pete is the current mascot of the University of Texas at El Paso (UTEP). He is a student dressed as a prospector, reflecting UTEP's nickname of "Miners".
