= Marcelino Huerta =

American football player and coach (1924–1985)

Biographical details
- Born: October 31, 1924; Tampa, Florida, U.S.
- Died: October 8, 1985 (aged 60); Tampa, Florida, U.S.

Playing career
- 1947–1949: Florida
- Position: Guard

Coaching career (HC unless noted)
- 1950–1951: Tampa (assistant)
- 1952–1961: Tampa
- 1962–1964: Wichita / Wichita State
- 1965–1967: Parsons (IA)

Head coaching record
- Overall: 104–53–2
- Bowls: 2–1

Accomplishments and honors

Championships
- 1 MVC (1963)

Awards
- University of Florida Athletic Hall of Fame
- College Football Hall of Fame; Inducted in 2002 (profile)

Marcelino Huerta Jr. (October 31, 1924 – October 8, 1985), also known by his nickname Chelo Huerta, was an American college football player and coach. Huerta played college football for the University of Florida, and he was later the head football coach for the University of Tampa, the Municipal University of Wichita—later known as Wichita State University—and Parsons College. He was inducted into the College Football Hall of Fame as a coach in 2002.

== Early years ==
Huerta was born in Tampa, Florida in 1924. He was the son of Ybor City cigar workers, both of whom were immigrants from Asturias in Spain. Huerta attended Hillsborough High School in Tampa, and was an offensive lineman for the Hillsborough Terriers high school football team.

He joined the U.S. Army Air Force during World War II, serving as a B-24 Liberator bomber pilot and flying missions over Nazi-occupied Europe. When Huerta's aircraft was shot down over Yugoslavia, he evaded capture by German military units, and with the assistance of Yugoslav partisans, he was able to safely return to his base.

== College playing career ==
After being discharged from military service, Huerta enrolled in the University of Florida in Gainesville, Florida, where he played guard for coach Raymond Wolf's Florida Gators football team from 1947 to 1949. He was a standout two-way lineman for the Gators during a time the players ironically dubbed the "Golden Era"—a stretch when the Gators never won more than five games in a season. Huerta graduated from Florida with a bachelor's degree in physical education in 1949, and he was later inducted into the University of Florida Athletic Hall of Fame as a "Gator Great" in 1983.

== College coaching career ==
Huerta served as the head coach of the Tampa Spartans football team and athletic director of the University of Tampa in Tampa, Florida, from 1952 to 1961. He compiled a 67–33–2 overall record and a .662 winning average while coaching the Spartans. In 1961, he became the 25th head football coach for the Municipal University of Wichita in Wichita, Kansas and he held that position for three seasons, from 1962 until 1964; the school changed its name to Wichita State University in 1964. His 1963 Shockers team finished 7–2 and were co-champions of the Missouri Valley Conference. In three seasons at Wichita State, he had an overall coaching record of 14–15 (.483). Huerta accepted the head coaching job at Parsons College in Fairfield, Iowa, where he coached the Parsons Wildcats football team from 1965 to 1967. In three seasons as the Wildcats' coach, he compiled an overall win–loss record of 23–5 for a winning percentage of .821. Huerta retired from college coaching after the 1967 season.

== Life after football ==
Huerta was a successful insurance agent for a year following his departure from the coaches ranks, but he didn't enjoy it. For the last sixteen years of his life, he was the head of the MacDonald Training Center, which assisted in the rehabilitation of handicapped children and young persons. In 1975, he testified before the U.S. Congress as an advocate for mentally and physically impaired children.

He was the founder of the "Football Players for Crippled Children" program, and was a member of the President's Council on Endowment for the Handicapped. Huerta received the Pop Warner Award for his work with young athletes. Huerta was well known on the Florida Gators alumni speaking circuit for his quick wit and humor, and he was an active participant in the "Golden Era" football alumni group from the late 1940s.

Huerta and his wife Gloria had a son, Marcelino J. "Bubba" Huerta, III, and a daughter Susan. Bubba Huerta played baseball for the Florida Gators baseball team and graduated from his father's alma mater, the University of Florida. Huerta died unexpectedly of a heart attack in 1985; he was 60 years old. He was survived by his wife and their son and daughter. Thousands of people attended his funeral at Christ the King Catholic Church in Tampa.

Huerta was inducted into the College Football Hall of Fame as a coach in 2002. He was also a member of the Florida Sports Hall of Fame. In commemoration of his service to the Tampa Bay community and its youth, the football field at his high school alma mater, Hillsborough High School, is named Marcelino "Chelo" Huerta Field in his honor in 1987.

== Head coaching record ==
| Year | Team | Overall | Conference | Standing | Bowl/playoffs |
|---|---|---|---|---|---|
Tampa Spartans (Independent) (1952–1961)
| 1952 | Tampa | 8–3–1 | | | W Cigar |
| 1953 | Tampa | 6–6 | | | |
| 1954 | Tampa | 8–2 | | | W Cigar |
| 1955 | Tampa | 7–2 | | | |
| 1956 | Tampa | 7–2 | | | |
| 1957 | Tampa | 6–3 | | | |
| 1958 | Tampa | 6–4 | | | |
| 1959 | Tampa | 3–7 | | | |
| 1960 | Tampa | 2–7–1 | | | |
| 1961 | Tampa | 8–1 | | | |
| Tampa: | | 67–33–2 | | | |
Wichita / Wichita State Shockers (Missouri Valley Conference) (1962–1964)
| 1962 | Wichita | 3–7 | 0–3 | 4th | |
| 1963 | Wichita | 7–2 | 4–1 | T–1st | |
| 1964 | Wichita State | 4–6 | 2–2 | 3rd | |
| Wichita State: | | 14–15 | 6–6 | | |
Parsons Wildcats (NCAA College Division independent) (1965–1967)
| 1965 | Parsons | 8–1 | | | |
| 1966 | Parsons | 9–2 | | | L Pecan |
| 1967 | Parsons | 6–3–1 | | | |
| Parsons: | | 23–5 | | | |
| Total: | | 104–53–2 | | | |
National championship Conference title Conference division title or championship game berth

== See also ==
- List of College Football Hall of Fame inductees (coaches)
- List of University of Florida alumni
