= University Field (UTEP) =

Soccer venue in El Paso, Texas

Coordinates: 31.782019°N 106.509308°W

- Interactive map of University Field
- Address: Address; El Paso, TX; United States
- Owner: University of Texas at El Paso
- Operator: UTEP Athletics Dept.
- Capacity: 500
- Surface: FieldTurf
- Current use: Soccer

Construction
- Opened: 1996; 30 years ago
- Renovated: 1999

Tenants
- UTEP Miners (NCAA) teams: men's and women's soccer (1996–present)

Website
- utepminers.com/university-field

University Field is the on-campus soccer stadium located in the city of El Paso in Texas, United States. It is owned and managed by the University of Texas at El Paso, and home venue for the UTEP Miners men's and women's teams.

The stadium, opened in 1996, has a capacity of 500 spectators, but room can be made for more if needed. In 1999, a lighting system was installed, which allowed teams to play night matches.

The first surface of the stadium was natural grass, but it was replaced by FieldTurf.
