= 1963 North Texas State Eagles football team =

American college football season

1963 North Texas State Eagles football
- Conference: Missouri Valley Conference
- Record: 3–6 (2–2 MVC)
- Head coach: Odus Mitchell (18th season)
- Home stadium: Fouts Field

1963 Missouri Valley Conference football standings
	Conf.					Overall
Team	W		L		T	W		L		T
Wichita +	3	–	1	–	0	7	–	2	–	0
Cincinnati +	3	–	1	–	0	6	–	4	–	0
Tulsa	2	–	2	–	0	5	–	5	–	0
North Texas State	2	–	2	–	0	3	–	6	–	0
Louisville	1	–	3	–	0	3	–	7	–	0
+ – Conference co-champions; Cincinnati and Louisville's games against Dayton counted in the conference standings.

The 1963 North Texas State Eagles football team was an American football team that represented North Texas State University (now known as the University of North Texas) during the 1963 NCAA University Division football season as a member of the Missouri Valley Conference. In their 18th year under head coach Odus Mitchell, the team compiled a 3–6 record. The Eagles game against Southern Illinois scheduled for November 23 at Fouts Field was canceled in deference to the assassination of John F. Kennedy which occurred the previous day at Dallas.

== Schedule ==
Date	Opponent	Site	Result	Attendance	Source
September 21	at Texas Western*	Sun Bowl; El Paso, TX	L 7–34	14,885–15,158	
September 28	Louisville	Fouts Field; Denton, TX	W 26–6	6,000	
October 5	at West Texas State*	Buffalo Bowl; Canyon, TX	L 16–38	16,235	
October 12	at Memphis State*	Crump Stadium; Memphis, TN	L 0–21	17,031	
October 19	Tulsa	Fouts Field; Denton, TX	L 21–22	4,000	
October 26	Wichita^{†}	Fouts Field; Denton, TX	W 7–3	14,000	
November 2	at Abilene Christian*	Shotwell Stadium; Abilene, TX	L 6–20	1,500	
November 9	at Cincinnati	Nippert Stadium; Cincinnati, OH	L 7–39	10,000	
November 16	Hardin–Simmons*	Fouts Field; Denton, TX	W 18–12	1,500–3,000	
November 23	Southern Illinois*	Fouts Field; Denton, TX	Canceled		
*Non-conference game; ^{†}Homecoming
