= 1963 Western Michigan Broncos football team =

American college football season

1963 Western Michigan Broncos football
- Conference: Mid-American Conference
- Record: 2–7 (2–4 MAC)
- Head coach: Merle Schlosser (7th season)
- MVP: Bill Somerville
- Captains: Allen Gibbs; Bill Somerville
- Home stadium: Waldo Stadium

1963 Mid-American Conference football standings
| | Conf. | | | | | Overall |
| Team | W | | L | | T | W | | L | | T |
|---|---|---|---|---|---|---|---|---|---|---|
| Ohio $ | 5 | – | 1 | – | 0 | 6 | – | 4 | – | 0 |
| Miami (OH) | 4 | – | 1 | – | 1 | 5 | – | 3 | – | 2 |
| Bowling Green | 4 | – | 2 | – | 0 | 8 | – | 2 | – | 0 |
| Marshall | 3 | – | 2 | – | 1 | 5 | – | 4 | – | 1 |
| Western Michigan | 2 | – | 4 | – | 0 | 2 | – | 7 | – | 0 |
| Kent State | 1 | – | 5 | – | 0 | 3 | – | 5 | – | 1 |
| Toledo | 1 | – | 5 | – | 0 | 2 | – | 7 | – | 0 |
$ – Conference champion

The 1963 Western Michigan Broncos football team represented Western Michigan University in the Mid-American Conference (MAC) during the 1963 NCAA University Division football season. In their seventh and final season under head coach Merle Schlosser, the Broncos compiled a 2–7 record (2–4 against MAC opponents), finished in fifth place in the MAC, and were outscored by their opponents, 201 to 111. The team played its home games at Waldo Stadium in Kalamazoo, Michigan.

The team's statistical leaders included Ken Barnhill with 668 passing yards, George Archer with 397 rushing yards, and Tom Patterson with 269 receiving yards. Halfback Allen Gibbs and end Bill Somerville were the team captains. End Bill Somerville received the team's most outstanding player award.

At the end of the 1963 season, Schlosser was reportedly hung in effigy twice, and The Holland Evening Sentinel reported that every player had signed a petition seeking his removal. Schlosser was fired as coach on December 28, 1963, and assigned to other duties in the physical education department. The team compiled a record of 28-33-3 in seven seasons under Schlosser.

== Schedule ==
| Date | Opponent | Site | Result | Attendance | Source |
|---|---|---|---|---|---|
| September 21 | at No. 7. Wisconsin* | Camp Randall Stadium; Madison, WI | L 0–41 | 48,574 | |
| September 28 | at Central Michigan* | Alumni Field; Mount Pleasant, MI (rivalry) | L 14–30 | 7,200 | |
| October 5 | Miami (OH) | Waldo Stadium; Kalamazoo, MI | L 19–27 | 12,000 | |
| October 12 | at Bowling Green | University Stadium; Bowling Green, OH | L 7–16 | 13,083 | |
| October 19 | Kent State^{†} | Waldo Stadium; Kalamazoo, MI | W 26–12 | 10,200 | |
| October 26 | at Toledo | Glass Bowl; Toledo, OH | W 18–7 | 9,200 | |
| November 2 | Marshall | Waldo Stadium; Kalamazoo, MI | L 7–20 | 11,200 | |
| November 9 | at Ohio | Peden Stadium; Athens, OH | L 13–27 | 14,500 | |
| November 16 | Louisville* | Waldo Stadium; Kalamazoo, MI | L 7–21 | 8,000 | |
*Non-conference game; ^{†}Homecoming; Rankings from AP Poll released prior to the game; Source:
