= 1963 Louisville Cardinals football team =

American college football season

1963 Louisville Cardinals football
- Conference: Missouri Valley Conference
- Record: 3–7 (1–3 MVC)
- Head coach: Frank Camp (18th season)
- Home stadium: Fairgrounds Stadium

1963 Missouri Valley Conference football standings
	Conf.					Overall
Team	W		L		T	W		L		T
Wichita +	3	–	1	–	0	7	–	2	–	0
Cincinnati +	3	–	1	–	0	6	–	4	–	0
Tulsa	2	–	2	–	0	5	–	5	–	0
North Texas State	2	–	2	–	0	3	–	6	–	0
Louisville	1	–	3	–	0	3	–	7	–	0
+ – Conference co-champions; Cincinnati and Louisville's games against Dayton counted in the conference standings.

The 1963 Louisville Cardinals football team was an American football team that represented the University of Louisville in the Missouri Valley Conference (MVC) during the 1963 NCAA University Division football season. In their 18th season under head coach Frank Camp, the Cardinals compiled an overall record of 3–7 record with a mark of 1–3 in conference play, placing last out of five team in the MVC, and were outscored by opponents 213 to 118.

The team's statistical leaders included Tom LaFramboise with 1,205 passing yards, Larry Compton with 199 rushing yards, Charlie Mudd with 367 receiving yards, and LaFramboise and Mudd with 26 points each.

== Schedule ==
Date	Opponent	Site	Result	Attendance	Source
September 28	at North Texas State	Fouts Field; Denton, TX	L 6–26	6,000	
October 5	Southern Illinois*	Fairgrounds Stadium; Louisville, KY	L 7–13	11,789	
October 12	Dayton (Note: Louisville's game against Dayton counted in the MVC standings.)	Fairgrounds Stadium; Louisville, KY	W 13–12	11,501	
October 19	Wichita	Fairgrounds Stadium; Louisville, KY	L 14–47	6,196	
October 26	Marshall*	Fairgrounds Stadium; Louisville, KY	W 27–14	9,069	
November 2	Memphis State*	Fairgrounds Stadium; Louisville, KY (rivalry)	L 0–25	7,869	
November 9	at Kent State*	Memorial Stadium; Kent, OH	L 7–26	6,123	
November 16	at Western Michigan*	Waldo Stadium; Kalamazoo, MI	W 21–7	8,000	
December 7	at Tulsa	Skelly Field; Tulsa, OK	L 16–22	5,071	
December 14	at Houston*	Rice Stadium; Houston, TX	L 7–21	5,000	
*Non-conference game; Source:
