= 1963 Toledo Rockets football team =

American college football season

1963 Toledo Rockets football
- Conference: Mid-American Conference
- Record: 2–7 (1–5 MAC)
- Head coach: Frank Lauterbur (1st season)
- Home stadium: Glass Bowl

1963 Mid-American Conference football standings
	Conf.					Overall
Team	W		L		T	W		L		T
Ohio $	5	–	1	–	0	6	–	4	–	0
Miami (OH)	4	–	1	–	1	5	–	3	–	2
Bowling Green	4	–	2	–	0	8	–	2	–	0
Marshall	3	–	2	–	1	5	–	4	–	1
Western Michigan	2	–	4	–	0	2	–	7	–	0
Kent State	1	–	5	–	0	3	–	5	–	1
Toledo	1	–	5	–	0	2	–	7	–	0
$ – Conference champion

The 1963 Toledo Rockets football team was an American football team that represented Toledo University in the Mid-American Conference (MAC) during the 1963 NCAA University Division football season. In their first season under head coach Frank Lauterbur, the Rockets compiled a 2–7 record (1–5 against MAC opponents), finished in seventh place in the MAC, and were outscored by all opponents by a combined total of 176 to 118.

The team's statistical leaders included Dan Simrell with 610 passing yards, Jim Gray with 645 rushing yards, and Tom Nolan with 169 receiving yards.

== Schedule ==
Date	Opponent	Site	Result	Attendance	Source
September 21	at Dayton*	Baujan Field; Dayton, OH	L 19–22	16,100	
September 28	Villanova*	Glass Bowl; Toledo, OH	L 14–18	14,200	
October 5	at Marshall	Fairfield Stadium; Huntington, WV	L 18–19	7,500	
October 12	Ohio	Glass Bowl; Toledo, OH	W 18–17	12,592	
October 19	at Bowling Green	University Stadium; Bowling Green, OH (rivalry)	L 20–22	10,119	
October 26	Western Michigan	Glass Bowl; Toledo, OH	L 7–18	9,200	
November 2	Kent State	Glass Bowl; Toledo, OH	L 0–20	4,200	
November 9	at Miami (OH)	Miami Field; Oxford, OH	L 8–40	12,564	
November 16	Southern Illinois	Glass Bowl; Toledo, OH	W 14–0	6,800–6,870	
November 23	Detroit	Glass Bowl; Toledo, OH	Cancelled		
*Non-conference game; Source:

== After the season ==
=== NFL draft ===
The following Rocket was selected in the 1964 NFL draft following the season.

Round	Pick	Player	Position	NFL club
16	221	Wynn Lembright	Tackle	New York Giants
