= 1963 Ohio Bobcats football team =

American college football season

1963 Ohio Bobcats football

MAC champion
- Conference: Mid-American Conference
- Record: 6–4 (5–1 MAC)
- Head coach: Bill Hess (6th season)
- Captains: Jim Albert; Dave Hutter
- Home stadium: Peden Stadium

1963 Mid-American Conference football standings
	Conf.					Overall
Team	W		L		T	W		L		T
Ohio $	5	–	1	–	0	6	–	4	–	0
Miami (OH)	4	–	1	–	1	5	–	3	–	2
Bowling Green	4	–	2	–	0	8	–	2	–	0
Marshall	3	–	2	–	1	5	–	4	–	1
Western Michigan	2	–	4	–	0	2	–	7	–	0
Kent State	1	–	5	–	0	3	–	5	–	1
Toledo	1	–	5	–	0	2	–	7	–	0
$ – Conference champion

The 1963 Ohio Bobcats football team was an American football team that represented Ohio University in the Mid-American Conference (MAC) during the 1963 NCAA University Division football season. In their sixth season under head coach Bill Hess, the Bobcats won the MAC championship, compiled a 6–4 record (5–1 against MAC opponents), and outscored all opponents by a combined total of 135 to 103. They played their home games in Peden Stadium in Athens, Ohio.

The team's statistical leaders included Jim Albert with 707 rushing yards, Wes Danyo with 635 passing yards, and Jim Albert with 186 receiving yards. Jim Albert also set a school record with a 95-yard interception return against Western Michigan.

== Schedule ==
Date	Opponent	Site	Result	Attendance	Source
September 21	Buffalo*	Peden Stadium; Athens, OH	L 0–7	11,000	
September 28	at Dayton*	Baujan Field; Dayton, OH	W 13–6	16,900	
October 5	Kent State	Peden Stadium; Athens, OH	W 20–0	9,200	
October 12	at Toledo	Glass Bowl; Toledo, OH	L 17–18	12,592	
October 19	Delaware*	Peden Stadium; Athens, OH	L 12–29	15,000	
October 26	at Miami (OH)	Miami Field; Oxford, OH (rivalry)	W 13–10	15,249	
November 2	at Xavier*	Xavier Stadium; Cincinnati, OH	L 0–20	9,271–9,297	
November 9	Western Michigan	Peden Stadium; Athens, OH	W 27–13	14,500	
November 16	Bowling Green	Peden Stadium; Athens, OH	W 16–0	12,800	
November 23	at Marshall	Fairfield Stadium; Huntington, WV (rivalry)	W 17–0		
*Non-conference game; Source:
