= 1963 Cincinnati Bearcats football team =

American college football season

1963 Cincinnati Bearcats football

MVC co-champion
- Conference: Missouri Valley Conference
- Record: 6–4 (3–1 MVC)
- Head coach: Chuck Studley (3rd season)
- Home stadium: Nippert Stadium

1963 Missouri Valley Conference football standings
	Conf.					Overall
Team	W		L		T	W		L		T
Wichita +	3	–	1	–	0	7	–	2	–	0
Cincinnati +	3	–	1	–	0	6	–	4	–	0
Tulsa	2	–	2	–	0	5	–	5	–	0
North Texas State	2	–	2	–	0	3	–	6	–	0
Louisville	1	–	3	–	0	3	–	7	–	0
+ – Conference co-champions; Cincinnati and Louisville's games against Dayton counted in the conference standings.

The 1963 Cincinnati Bearcats football team represented the University of Cincinnati in the Missouri Valley Conference (MVC) during the 1963 NCAA University Division football season. Led by third-year head coach Chuck Studley, the Bearcats compiled an overall record of 6–4 with a mark of 3–1 in conference play, sharing the MVC title with Wichita. The team played home games at Nippert Stadium in Cincinnati.

== Schedule ==
Date	Time	Opponent	Site	Result	Attendance	Source
September 21	8:00 p.m.	Drake*	Nippert Stadium; Cincinnati, OH	W 28–0	12,000	
September 28		at Army*	Michie Stadium; West Point, NY	L 0–22	17,700	
October 5	8:00 p.m.	Xavier*	Nippert Stadium; Cincinnati, OH (rivalry)	W 35–22	25,000–25,500	
October 12		at Tulsa	Skelly Stadium; Tulsa, OK	W 21–15	9,823	
October 19	2:00 p.m.	Detroit*^{†}	Nippert Stadium; Cincinnati, OH	W 35–0	16,000–16,500	
October 26		at Indiana*	Seventeenth Street Stadium; Bloomington, IN	L 6–20	34,583	
November 2	2:00 p.m.	Dayton (Note: Cincinnati's game against Dayton counted in the MVC standings.)	Nippert Stadium; Cincinnati, OH	W 35–8	11,000	
November 9	2:00 p.m.	North Texas State	Nippert Stadium; Cincinnati, OH	W 39–7	10,000	
November 16		at Wichita	Veterans Field; Wichita, KS	L 20–23	11,589	
November 28		Miami (OH)*	Nippert Stadium; Cincinnati, OH (Victory Bell)	L 19–21	12,500	
*Non-conference game; ^{†}Homecoming; Source:
