= 1963 Kent State Golden Flashes football team =

American college football season

1963 Kent State Golden Flashes football
- Conference: Mid-American Conference
- Record: 3–5–1 (1–5 MAC)
- Head coach: Trevor J. Rees (18th season)
- Home stadium: Memorial Stadium

1963 Mid-American Conference football standings
	Conf.					Overall
Team	W		L		T	W		L		T
Ohio $	5	–	1	–	0	6	–	4	–	0
Miami (OH)	4	–	1	–	1	5	–	3	–	2
Bowling Green	4	–	2	–	0	8	–	2	–	0
Marshall	3	–	2	–	1	5	–	4	–	1
Western Michigan	2	–	4	–	0	2	–	7	–	0
Kent State	1	–	5	–	0	3	–	5	–	1
Toledo	1	–	5	–	0	2	–	7	–	0
$ – Conference champion

The 1963 Kent State Golden Flashes football team was an American football team that represented Kent State University in the Mid-American Conference (MAC) during the 1963 NCAA University Division football season. In their 18th season under head coach Trevor J. Rees, the Golden Flashes compiled a 3–5–1 record (1–5 against MAC opponents), finished in sixth place in the MAC and were outscored by all opponents by a combined total of 122 to 107.

The team's statistical leaders included Bill Asbury with 349 rushing yards, Ron Mollric with 293 passing yards, and Tom Zuppke with 122 receiving yards.

On October 23, 1963, Trevor Rees announced his resignation as Kent State's head football coach, effective at the end of the 1963 season. He compiled a 92–63–5 in 18 years as Kent State's coach, but at the time of his announcement, his teams had gone 5–17–1 since the start of the 1961 season. After Rees announced his resignation, the team won three of four games to conclude the 1963 season.

== Schedule ==
Date	Opponent	Site	Result	Attendance	Source
September 28	at Xavier*	Xavier Stadium; Cincinnati, OH	T 7–7	7,844	
October 5	at Ohio	Peden Stadium; Athens, OH	L 0–20	9,200	
October 12	Miami (OH)	Memorial Stadium; Kent, OH	L 8–30	11,200	
October 19	at Western Michigan	Waldo Stadium; Kalamazoo, MI	L 12–26	10,200	
October 26	Bowling Green	Memorial Stadium; Kent, OH (rivalry)	L 3–18	10,000	
November 2	at Toledo	Glass Bowl; Toledo, OH	W 20–0	4,200	
November 9	Louisville*	Memorial Stadium; Kent, OH	W 26–7	6,123	
November 16	Marshall	Memorial Stadium; Kent, OH	L 8–14	3,500	
November 23	Dayton*	Memorial Stadium; Kent, OH	W 23–0	3,500	
*Non-conference game; Source:
