= 1963 Miami Redskins football team =

American college football season

1963 Miami Redskins football
- Conference: Mid-American Conference
- Record: 5–3–2 (4–1–1 MAC)
- Head coach: Bo Schembechler (1st season)
- MVPs: Tom Longsworth; Dave Mallory
- Captains: Tom Longsworth; Dave Mallory
- Home stadium: Miami Field

1963 Mid-American Conference football standings
	Conf.					Overall
Team	W		L		T	W		L		T
Ohio $	5	–	1	–	0	6	–	4	–	0
Miami (OH)	4	–	1	–	1	5	–	3	–	2
Bowling Green	4	–	2	–	0	8	–	2	–	0
Marshall	3	–	2	–	1	5	–	4	–	1
Western Michigan	2	–	4	–	0	2	–	7	–	0
Kent State	1	–	5	–	0	3	–	5	–	1
Toledo	1	–	5	–	0	2	–	7	–	0
$ – Conference champion

The 1963 Miami Redskins football team was an American football team that represented Miami University during the 1963 NCAA University Division football season. In March 1963, following John Pont's resignation as head coach, Miami hired Bo Schembechler, who had played for the team from 1948 to 1950 and served as an assistant coach in 1955, as the new head football coach.

In their first season under Schembechler, Miami finished in second place in the Mid-American Conference (MAC), compiled a 5–3–2 record (4–1–1 against MAC opponents), and outscored all opponents by a combined total of 208 to 178. Dave McClain joined Schembechler's staff as an assistant coach in 1963.

The team's statistical leaders included quarterback Ernie Kellermann with 895 passing yards, Tom Longsworth with 642 rushing yards, and Jack Himebauch with 226 receiving yards.

Three Miami players were selected as first-team players on the All-MAC team: quarterback Ernie Kellermann, fullback Tom Longsworth, and guard Dave Mallory. Longsworth and Mallory were the team captains and also shared the team's most valuable player honors.

== Schedule ==
Date	Opponent	Site	Result	Attendance	Source
September 21	Xavier*	Miami Field; Oxford, OH	L 12–21	10,457	
September 28	Marshall	Miami Field; Oxford, OH	T 14–14	10,387	
October 5	at Western Michigan	Waldo Stadium; Kalamazoo, MI	W 27–19	12,000	
October 12	at Kent State	Memorial Stadium; Kent, OH	W 30–8	11,200	
October 19	at No. 10 Northwestern*	Dyche Stadium; Evanston, IL	L 6–37	43,333	
October 26	Ohio	Miami Field; Oxford, OH (rivalry)	L 10–13	15,249	
November 2	at Bowling Green	University Stadium; Bowling Green, OH	W 21–12	14,126	
November 9	Toledo	Miami Field; Oxford, OH	W 40–8	12,564	
November 17	at Dayton*	Baujan Field; Dayton, OH	T 27–27		
November 28	at Cincinnati*	Nippert Stadium; Cincinnati, OH (rivalry)	W 21–19	12,500	
*Non-conference game; Rankings from AP Poll released prior to the game; Source:
