= 1963 Bowling Green Falcons football team =

American college football season

1963 Bowling Green Falcons football
- Conference: Mid-American Conference
- Record: 8–2 (4–2 MAC)
- Head coach: Doyt Perry (9th season)
- Home stadium: University Stadium

1963 Mid-American Conference football standings
	Conf.					Overall
Team	W		L		T	W		L		T
Ohio $	5	–	1	–	0	6	–	4	–	0
Miami (OH)	4	–	1	–	1	5	–	3	–	2
Bowling Green	4	–	2	–	0	8	–	2	–	0
Marshall	3	–	2	–	1	5	–	4	–	1
Western Michigan	2	–	4	–	0	2	–	7	–	0
Kent State	1	–	5	–	0	3	–	5	–	1
Toledo	1	–	5	–	0	2	–	7	–	0
$ – Conference champion

The 1963 Bowling Green Falcons football team was an American football team that represented Bowling Green State University in the Mid-American Conference (MAC) during the 1963 NCAA University Division football season. In their ninth season under head coach Doyt Perry, the Falcons compiled an 8–2 record (4–2 against MAC opponents), finished in third place in the MAC, and outscored opponents by a combined total of 201 to 116.

The team's statistical leaders included Jerry Ward with 858 passing yards, Jay Cunningham with 539 rushing yards, and Tom Sims with 177 receiving yards.

== Schedule ==
Date	Opponent	Site	Result	Attendance	Source
September 21	Detroit*	University Stadium; Bowling Green, OH	W 27–14		
September 28	at Southern Illinois*	McAndrew Stadium; Carbondale, IL	W 31–6	12,500	
October 5	Dayton*	University Stadium; Bowling Green, OH	W 28–0	11,232	
October 12	Western Michigan	University Stadium; Bowling Green, OH	W 16–7	13,083	
October 19	Toledo	University Stadium; Bowling Green, OH (rivalry)	W 22–20	10,119	
October 26	at Kent State	Memorial Stadium; Kent, OH (rivalry)	W 18–3	10,000	
November 2	Miami (OH)	University Stadium; Bowling Green, OH	L 12–21	14,126	
November 9	at Marshall	Fairfield Stadium; Huntington, WV	W 21–14	12,000	
November 16	at Ohio	Peden Stadium; Athens, OH	L 0–16	12,800	
November 23	Xavier*	University Stadium; Bowling Green, OH	W 26–15	5,119	
*Non-conference game; Source:
