= UTEP Miners =

Athletic program of the University of Texas at El Paso

- University: University of Texas at El Paso
- Nickname: Miners and Lady Miners
- NCAA: Division I (FBS)
- Conference: Mountain West (primary); PRC (women's rifle)
- Athletic director: Jim Senter
- Location: El Paso, Texas
- Varsity teams: 17 (6 men’s and 11 women’s)
- Football stadium: Sun Bowl
- Basketball arena: Don Haskins Center
- Softball stadium: Helen of Troy Softball Complex
- Soccer stadium: University Field
- Other venues: Memorial Gym; Kidd Field
- Colors: Dark blue, orange, and silver accent
- Mascot: Paydirt Pete
- Fight song: El Paso Fight
- Website: utepminers.com

The UTEP Miners is the name given to the sports teams of the University of Texas at El Paso (UTEP). They compete in the Mountain West Conference of the Football Bowl Subdivision (FBS) of NCAA Division I. UTEP's colors are orange and blue and the mascot is a miner named Paydirt Pete.

UTEP previously was a member of the Western Athletic Conference from 1967 to 2005, when they joined Rice, Tulsa, and SMU in leaving the WAC for Conference USA, which they were a member until they joined the Mountain West Conference (MW) on July 1, 2026.

== Sports sponsored ==
Men's sports	Women's sports
Basketball	Basketball
Cross country	Cross country
Football	Golf
Golf	Rifle
Track and field^{1}	Soccer
	Softball
	Tennis
	Track and field^{1}
	Volleyball
	Beach volleyball
^{1} – includes both indoor and outdoor

=== Football ===
Established in 1914, the UTEP Miners football team currently competes at the NCAA Division I Football Bowl Subdivision (FBS) level. The team plays its home games in the Sun Bowl. Scotty Walden has served as the program head coach since the 2024 season.

==== Traveling trophies ====
The winner of the UTEP vs. New Mexico State University football game receives a pair of traveling trophies: "The Silver Spade" and "The Brass Spittoon". The first spade used for this purpose was an old prospector's shovel dug up from an abandoned mine in the Organ Mountains near Las Cruces, New Mexico in 1947. This was the symbol of victory, and the spade was given to the winner of the football game between the Miners and Aggies each year.

The idea of the present Silver Spade was from UTEP student Don Henderson, the student association president and now a very successful El Paso businessman and former mayor of the city. In 1955 Henderson secured the present spade and each year the score of the game is engraved on the blade.

Perhaps the idea behind the spade is the fact that at the time the prospector's spade was uncovered, both schools' major field of study had use for the tool, mining and metallurgy for the College of Mines and agriculture at then New Mexico A&M.

The Brass Spittoon, officially known as the Mayor's Cup, came into existence in 1982 when the mayors of the two cities; Jonathan Rogers of El Paso, and David Steinberg of Las Cruces decided to present another traveling trophy to the winner of the UTEP vs New Mexico State University game. This game is more commonly known as "The Battle of I-10".

UTEP was a member of the Border Intercollegiate Athletic Association, from 1941 to 1961. The football team won a conference championship in 1956.

=== Men's basketball ===
==== 1966 Texas Western basketball team ====
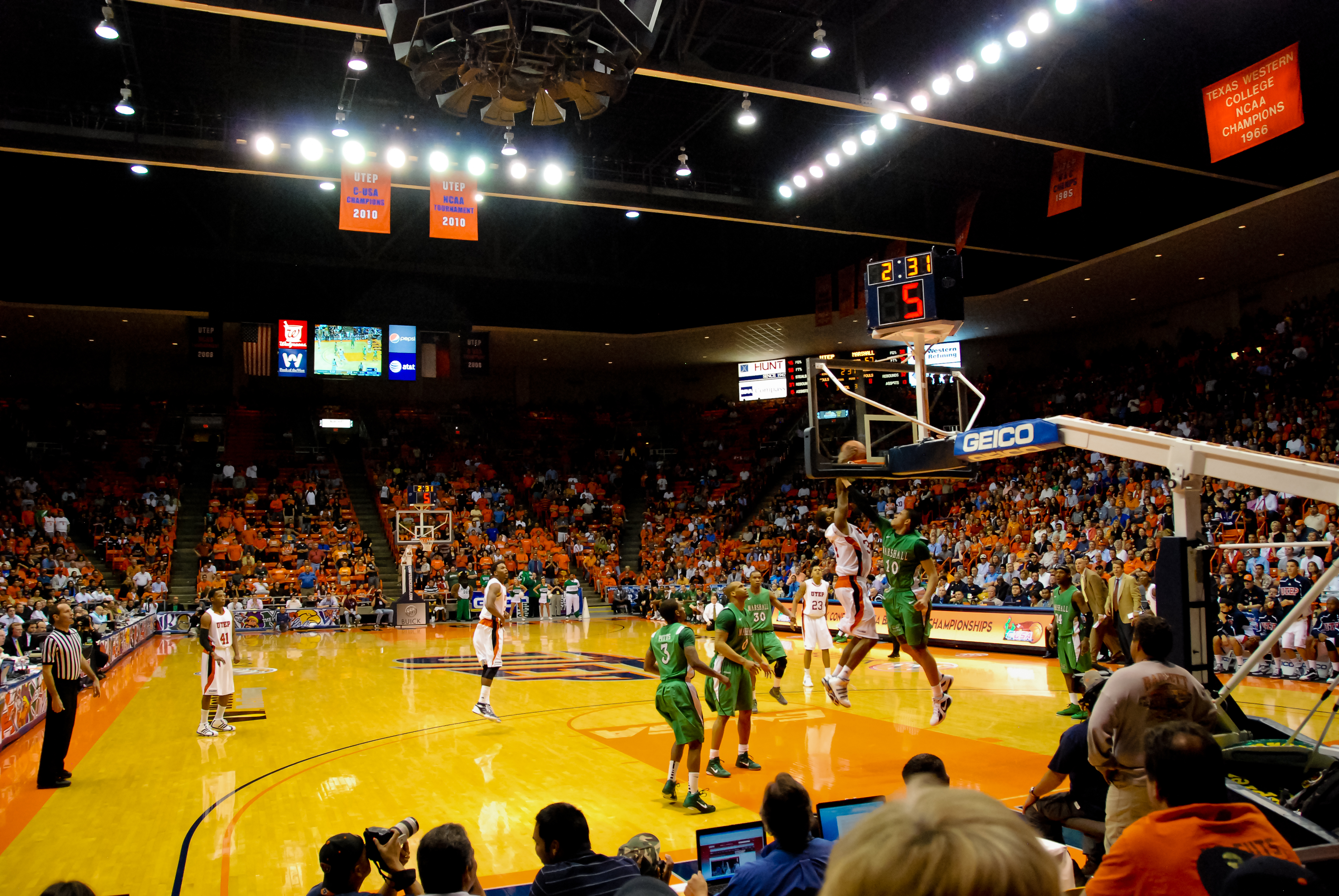
UTEP men's basketball at the Don Haskins Center

As Texas Western, the Miners won the 1966 NCAA Men's Division I Basketball Tournament. The 72–65 victory over Kentucky at The University of Maryland's Cole Field House in College Park, Maryland is considered one of the most important games in the history of college basketball. It marked the first time that a team started 5 African-American players in a title game. Contrary to popular belief, this game was not an "upset" since Kentucky and Texas Western entered the game ranked #1 and #2 respectively, with each team having only one loss. At this time, Kentucky had no African-American players (though Adolph Rupp gave formal scholarship offers to black players as early as 1964, it was not until Tom Payne in 1971 that a black player finally joined the Wildcats). The impact of the game was pivotal primarily because it occurred during the height of the Civil Rights Movement.

The title team has been chronicled throughout the American media, including the books Basketball's Biggest Upset by Ray Sanchez and When the Walls Came Tumbling Down by Frank Fitzpatrick, and the 2006 Disney movie, Glory Road.

The team was inducted into the Basketball Hall of Fame.

=== Cross Country ===
The UTEP Miners' men's cross country team has won 7 national cross country championships, the most recent of which came in 1981 and including a four-year streak of national championships from 1978 to 1981. They have qualified for 18 national championships, finishing first 7 times, second twice, third twice, and fifth once. They were originally awarded the 1983 NCAA Division I Cross Country Championship title, but it was later revoked amid allegations of slush fund payments to runners. The Miners' men's and women's cross country teams have been coached since 2003 by former professional athlete and Olympic 800 meter gold medalist Paul Ereng. The men's team has had three individual national champions: Suleiman Nyambui in 1980, Matthews Motshwarateu in 1981, and Zakarie Barie in 1983. The Miners' women's cross country team earned a trip to the NCAA Division I Women's Cross Country Championships every year from 1987 to 2009, finishing as high as 5th in 1987. The women's team has not had an individual champion.

=== Rifle ===
In June 2013, the Miners' rifle team became a charter member of the Patriot Rifle Conference.

== Championships ==
=== NCAA team championships ===
UTEP has won 21 NCAA team national championships.

- Men's (21)
  - Men's basketball: 1 (1966)
  - Men's cross country: 7 (1969, 1975, 1976, 1978, 1979, 1980, 1981)
  - Men's indoor track & field: 7 (1974, 1975, 1976, 1978, 1980, 1981, 1982)
  - Men's outdoor track & field: 6 (1975, 1978, 1979, 1980, 1981, 1982)

== Spirit ==
=== Fight song ===
UTEP's fight song was written by the school's music department in the late 1980s. It is based on Marty Robbins's Grammy-winning song "El Paso" with slightly rewritten lyrics and tempo, and was used with the permission of Robbins's estate.

== 2008 Olympics ==
UTEP students and alumni participated in track and field events.

Athlete	Event	Team
Mickaël Hanany	high jump	France
Blessing Okagbare	long jump	Nigeria
Blessing Okagbare; Oludamola Osayomi; Halimat Ismaila	women's 4×100 meter relay	Nigeria
Oludamola Osayomi	100M women	Nigeria
Oludamola Osayomi	200M women	Nigeria
Halimat Ismaila	100M women	Nigeria
Churandy Martina	100M men	Netherlands Antilles
Churandy Martina	200M men	Netherlands Antilles
Ronalds Arājs	200M men	Latvia
Caimin Douglas	men 4×100 meter relay	Netherlands
Erma-Gene Evans	javelin	Saint Lucia
Alexandros Papadimitriou	hammer throw men	Greece
Henderson Dottin		Barbados
Fatimoh Muhammed		Liberia

== Venues ==
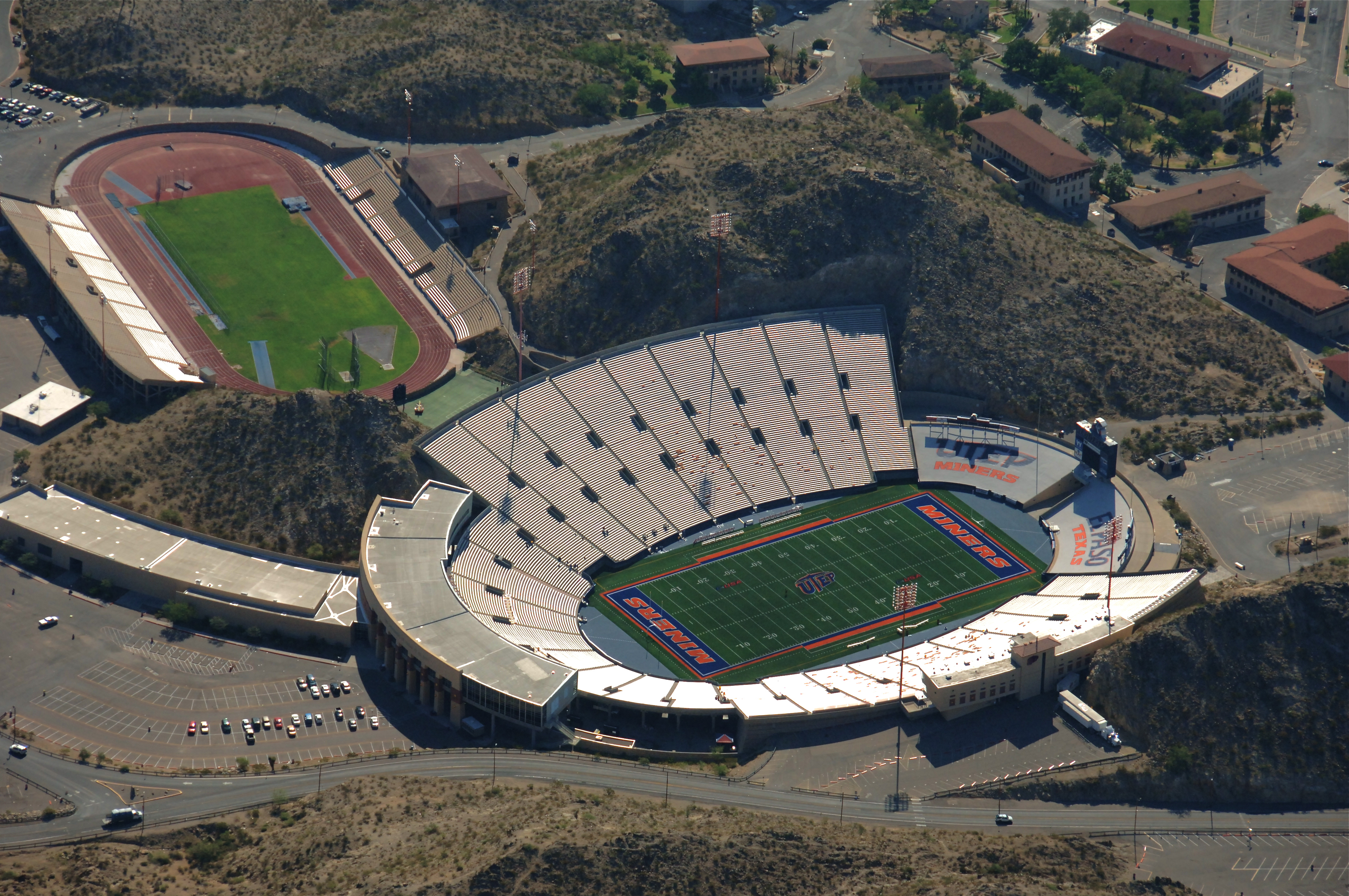
Aerial view of Kidd Field (upper left) and Sun Bowl Stadium (lower right)

UTEP owns the two largest stadiums in El Paso:

- Sun Bowl Stadium, seating capacity 51,500, opened its doors in 1963 and is currently the home to the UTEP football team and to the annual Sun Bowl game.
- Don Haskins Center, seating capacity 12,000, was built in 1976 and is primarily used by the men's and women's basketball teams.
- University Field (UTEP), seating capacity 500, was built in 1991 and hosts the women's soccer team.
- Kidd Field, former home to the Miners football team and current home of the track and field teams.
