= 1963 Marshall Thundering Herd football team =

American college football season

1963 Marshall Thundering Herd football
- Conference: Mid-American Conference
- Record: 5–4–1 (3–2–1 MAC)
- Head coach: Charlie Snyder (5th season)
- Captains: Zeke Myers; Everett Vance
- Home stadium: Fairfield Stadium

1963 Mid-American Conference football standings
| | Conf. | | | | | Overall |
| Team | W | | L | | T | W | | L | | T |
|---|---|---|---|---|---|---|---|---|---|---|
| Ohio $ | 5 | – | 1 | – | 0 | 6 | – | 4 | – | 0 |
| Miami (OH) | 4 | – | 1 | – | 1 | 5 | – | 3 | – | 2 |
| Bowling Green | 4 | – | 2 | – | 0 | 8 | – | 2 | – | 0 |
| Marshall | 3 | – | 2 | – | 1 | 5 | – | 4 | – | 1 |
| Western Michigan | 2 | – | 4 | – | 0 | 2 | – | 7 | – | 0 |
| Kent State | 1 | – | 5 | – | 0 | 3 | – | 5 | – | 1 |
| Toledo | 1 | – | 5 | – | 0 | 2 | – | 7 | – | 0 |
$ – Conference champion

The 1963 Marshall Thundering Herd football team was an American football team that represented Marshall University in the Mid-American Conference (MAC) during the 1963 NCAA University Division football season. In its fifth season under head coach Charlie Snyder, the team compiled a 5–4–1 record (3–2–1 against conference opponents), finished in fourth place out of seven teams in the MAC, scored 139 points, and gave up 139 points. Zeke Myers and Everett Vance were the team captains. The team played its home games at Fairfield Stadium in Huntington, West Virginia.

== Schedule ==
| Date | Opponent | Site | Result | Attendance | Source |
|---|---|---|---|---|---|
| September 21 | Morehead State* | Fairfield Stadium; Huntington, WV | L 6–19 | 8,000 | |
| September 28 | at Miami (OH) | Miami Field; Oxford, OH | T 14–14 | 10,387 | |
| October 5 | Toledo | Fairfield Stadium; Huntington, WV | W 19–18 | 7,500 | |
| October 12 | at Buffalo* | Rotary Field; Buffalo, NY | W 10–8 | 10,326 | |
| October 19 | Kentucky State* | Fairfield Stadium; Huntington, WV | W 28–0 | 9,000 | |
| October 26 | at Louisville* | Fairgrounds Stadium; Louisville, KY | L 14–27 | 9,069 | |
| November 2 | at Western Michigan | Waldo Stadium; Kalamazoo, MI | W 20–7 | 11,200 | |
| November 9 | Bowling Green | Fairfield Stadium; Huntington, WV | L 14–21 | 12,000 | |
| November 16 | at Kent State | Memorial Stadium; Kent, OH | W 14–8 | 3,500 | |
| November 23 | Ohio | Fairfield Stadium; Huntington, WV (rivalry) | L 0–17 | | |
*Non-conference game; Source:
