= 1963 Tulsa Golden Hurricane football team =

American college football season

1963 Tulsa Golden Hurricane football
- Conference: Missouri Valley Conference
- Record: 5–5 (2–2 MVC)
- Head coach: Glenn Dobbs (3rd season)
- Home stadium: Skelly Stadium

1963 Missouri Valley Conference football standings
	Conf.					Overall
Team	W		L		T	W		L		T
Wichita +	3	–	1	–	0	7	–	2	–	0
Cincinnati +	3	–	1	–	0	6	–	4	–	0
Tulsa	2	–	2	–	0	5	–	5	–	0
North Texas State	2	–	2	–	0	3	–	6	–	0
Louisville	1	–	3	–	0	3	–	7	–	0
+ – Conference co-champions; Cincinnati and Louisville's games against Dayton counted in the conference standings.

The 1963 Tulsa Golden Hurricane football team represented the University of Tulsa during the 1963 NCAA University Division football season. In their third year under head coach Glenn Dobbs, the Golden Hurricane compiled a 5–5 record (2–2 against Missouri Valley Conference opponents) and finished in third place in the conference. The team's statistical leaders included Jerry Rhome with 1,909 passing yards, Hank Dorsch with 211 rushing yards, and John Simmons with 543 receiving yards. Under Glenn Dobbs, Tulsa led the nation in passing for five straight years from 1962 to 1966.

== Schedule ==
Date	Opponent	Site	Result	Attendance	Source
September 21	Montana State*	Skelly Stadium; Tulsa, OK	W 23–13	13,400	
October 5	at Memphis State*	Crump Stadium; Memphis, TN	L 15–28	12,057	
October 12	Cincinnati^{†}	Skelly Stadium; Tulsa, OK	L 15–21	9,823	
October 19	at North Texas State	Fouts Field; Denton, TX	W 22–21	4,000	
October 26	at Arkansas*	Razorback Stadium; Fayetteville, AR	L 7–56	27,000	
November 2	Southern Illinois*	Skelly Stadium; Tulsa, OK	W 49–6	7,500–7,634	
November 9	at Oklahoma State*	Lewis Field; Stillwater, OK (rivalry)	L 24–33	15,000	
November 16	Houston*	Skelly Stadium; Tulsa, OK	W 22–21	5,662	
November 30	at Wichita	Veterans Field; Wichita, KS	L 15–26	9,830	
December 7	Louisville	Skelly Stadium; Tulsa, OK	W 22–16	5,071	
*Non-conference game; ^{†}Homecoming; Source:

== After the season ==
=== 1964 NFL draft ===
The following Golden Hurricane players were selected in the [[1964 NFL draft}]] following the season.

Round	Pick	Player	Position	NFL club
8	99	Bob Daugherty	Halfback	San Francisco 49ers
13	172	Jerry Rhome	Quarterback	Dallas Cowboys
15	200	Bill Van Burkleo	Back	Dallas Cowboys

=== 1964 AFL draft ===
The following Golden Hurricane players were selected in the 1964 American Football League draft following the season.

Round	Pick	Player	Position	AFL club
16	128	Bob Daugherty	Halfback	San Diego Chargers
24	192	Bill Van Burkleo	Halfback	San Diego Chargers
25	195	Jerry Rhome	Quarterback	New York Jets
