= Sun Bowl (stadium) =

Stadium at the University of Texas at El Paso

- Aerial view from the south in 2026

- Location in the United States Location in Texas
- Interactive map of Sun Bowl
- Address: 2701 Sun Bowl Drive
- Location: University of Texas at El Paso; El Paso, Texas, U.S.
- Coordinates: 31.773°N 106.508°W
- Elevation: 3,910 feet (1,190 m)
- Owner: University of Texas at El Paso
- Operator: University of Texas at El Paso
- Capacity: 30,000 (1963–1981); 52,000 (1982–2000); 51,500 (2001–????); 45,971 (????-present)
- Surface: Natural grass (1963–1973); AstroTurf (1974–2000); AstroPlay (2001–2014); FieldTurf (2015–present)

Construction
- Groundbreaking: August 1, 1961; 65 years ago
- Opened: September 21, 1963; 63 years ago
- Renovated: 2006, 2018
- Expanded: 1982
- Cost: $275,000 (approximate, original)
- Architects: Garland & Hilles; Carroll & Daeuble
- General contractor: Ponsford Brothers

Tenants
- UTEP Miners (NCAA) (1963–present); Sun Bowl (NCAA) (1963–present); El Paso Patriots (USL PDL) (1989–2001); Texas vs. Nation Game (NCAA) (2007–2010); El Paso ISD (selected games)

The Sun Bowl is an outdoor football stadium in the Southwestern United States, on the campus of the University of Texas at El Paso (UTEP). It is home to the UTEP Miners of the Mountain West Conference and the college football bowl game also known as the Sun Bowl. The stadium opened in 1963 and has a nominal seating capacity of 51,500, although UTEP currently lists the capacity as 45,971.

== History ==
The stadium, named for the game it hosts, was opened 63 years ago in 1963 with a Texas Western win over North Texas State on September 21. The opening play was a 54-yard touchdown run by Larry Durham of the Miners.

The land on which the stadium sits was originally donated by the university to El Paso County, who built the stadium for the school and the Sun Bowl game. Both had previously used Kidd Field, the current track and field venue, which seats 15,000. The city had realized that the game could not expand its audience or the list of teams that it could invite without a bigger stadium, so the Sun Bowl was built in a natural bowl adjacent to the west. It originally sat 30,000, with only the sideline grandstands. The playing field runs nearly north–south (tilted about 10° NW–SE) at an elevation of 3,910 feet (1,190 m) above sea level.

=== Renovations ===
The current press box was added in 1969, and the stadium reached the capacity of 52,000 in 1982 with the addition of the north end zone stands and the expansion of the east stands. (The south end zone is still vacant, with the ground of the bowl covered with the school's logos.)

The school retook control of the land and stadium in 2001, when hundreds of seats were removed as part of a re–configuration of the seating bowl to accommodate soccer, which lowered capacity to its current figure of 51,500.

The school's Athletics Director, Jim Senter, announced on April 13, 2018 plans to renovate the Sun Bowl stadium. The $15 million project would include luxury boxes installed in a new press facility, renovation of the concourses and premium seating added on the west side of the stadium. The renovations were completed in time for the 2021 season.

== Notable events ==
=== Postseason college football ===
==== Sun Bowl ====
The college football bowl game began in January 1936 and moved to the new stadium in December 1963. All games have been played in El Paso.

==== All-star game ====
On February 2, 2007, the stadium hosted the inaugural Texas vs. The Nation all-star college football game; the Nation defeated Texas 24–20.

=== Concerts ===
Since the 1990s, the Sun Bowl has hosted several concerts such as The Rolling Stones, U2, Pink Floyd, Ricky Martin, NSYNC, One Direction (a sellout), Guns 'n' Roses, and a co-headlining performance by Mötley Crüe, Def Leppard, and Alice Cooper. Notably, the Mexican pop group RBD kicked off their Soy Rebelde Tour at the stadium, marking their first live show in nearly 15 years. British rock band Coldplay performed at Sun Bowl on June 13 and 14, 2025, as part of their Music of the Spheres World Tour; they became the first act to hold two concerts at the stadium during a single tour and the first act to sell out the Sun Bowl in advance of a performance. South Korean group BTS performed two sold-out concerts at the stadium on May 2 and 3, 2026, as part of their Arirang World Tour, drawing approximately 97,700 attendees and becoming the largest concert event in the history of the Sun Bowl. On September 5 and 6, 2026, Karol G came to El Paso as part of her Viajando Por El Mundo Tropitour and sold a combined 152,000 tickets, with both concerts selling out at an expanded 76,000 capacity on both nights.

=== Other events ===
On February 17, 2016, the stadium hosted festivities and a simulcast of the Mass held by Pope Francis during the pontiff's visit to Ciudad Juárez, Mexico, several miles away across the Rio Grande.

== Other tenants ==
For a short time before moving to Dudley Field, the El Paso Patriots soccer team in the Premier Development League (now known as USL League Two) made its home at the Sun Bowl. The Patriots played their final seasons at Patriot Stadium.

In a revised version of the 2020 season, New Mexico State played at the Sun Bowl during the spring of 2021 due to COVID restrictions affecting Doña Ana County.

== Photos ==
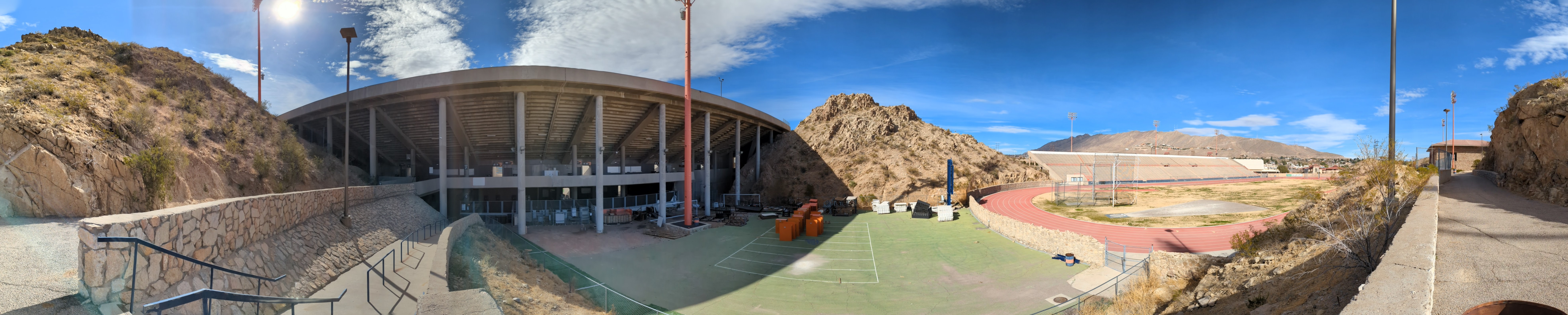
Panoramic view with Kidd Field and the underside of the Sun Bowl stadium
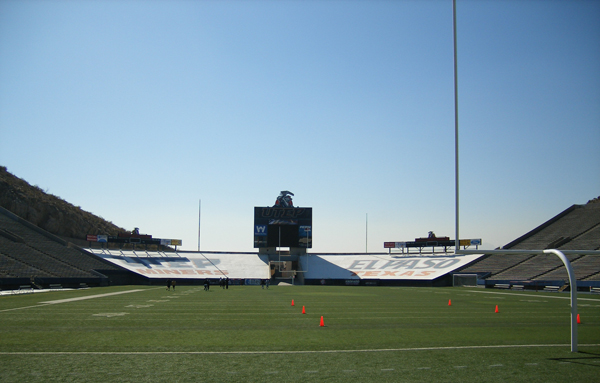
View from the Durham Center

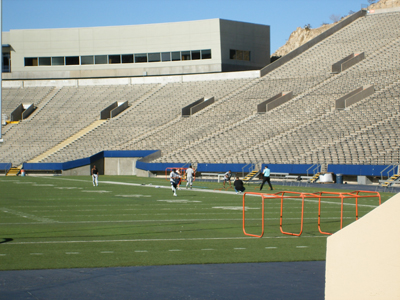
View from tunnel

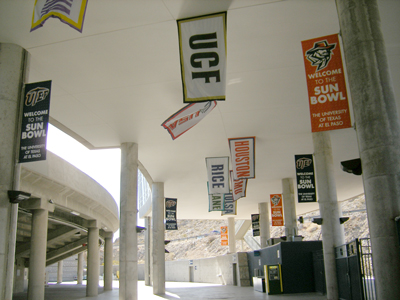
View from within the stadium

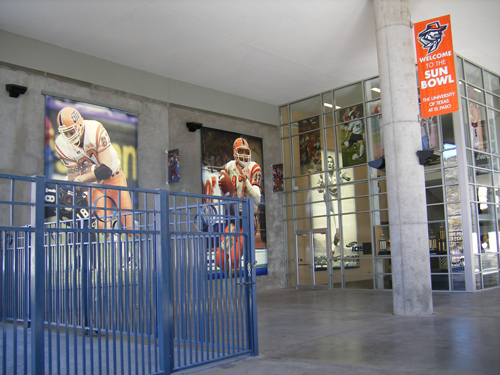

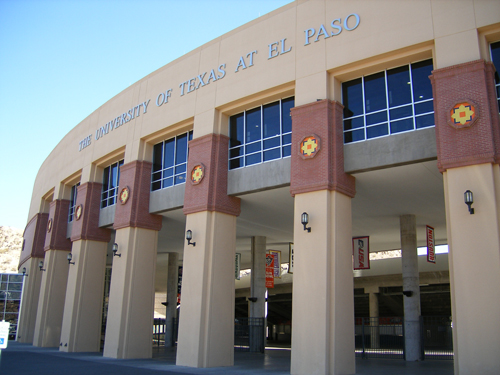
View from northern entrance

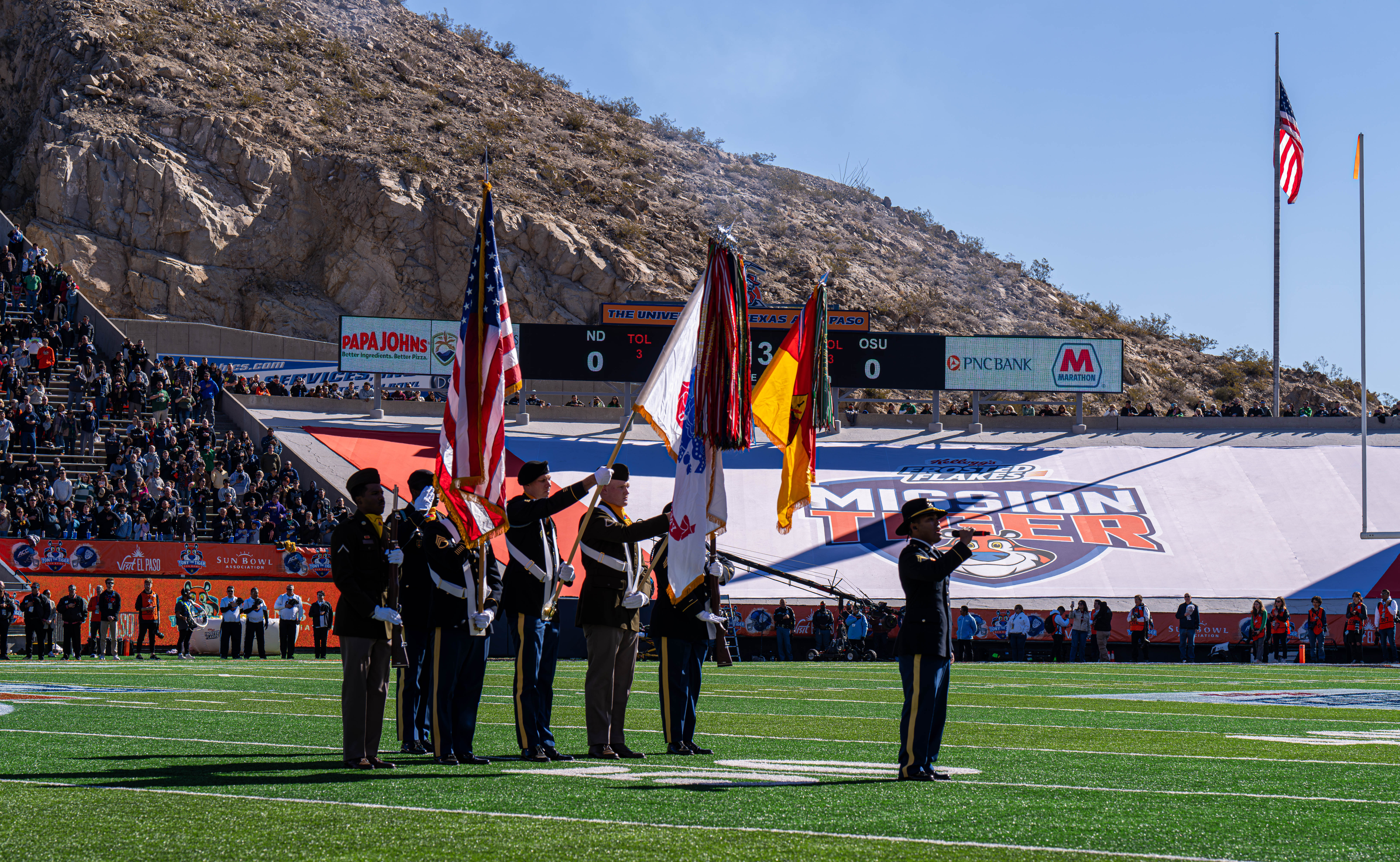
U.S. Army color guard on the field before the 2023 Sun Bowl

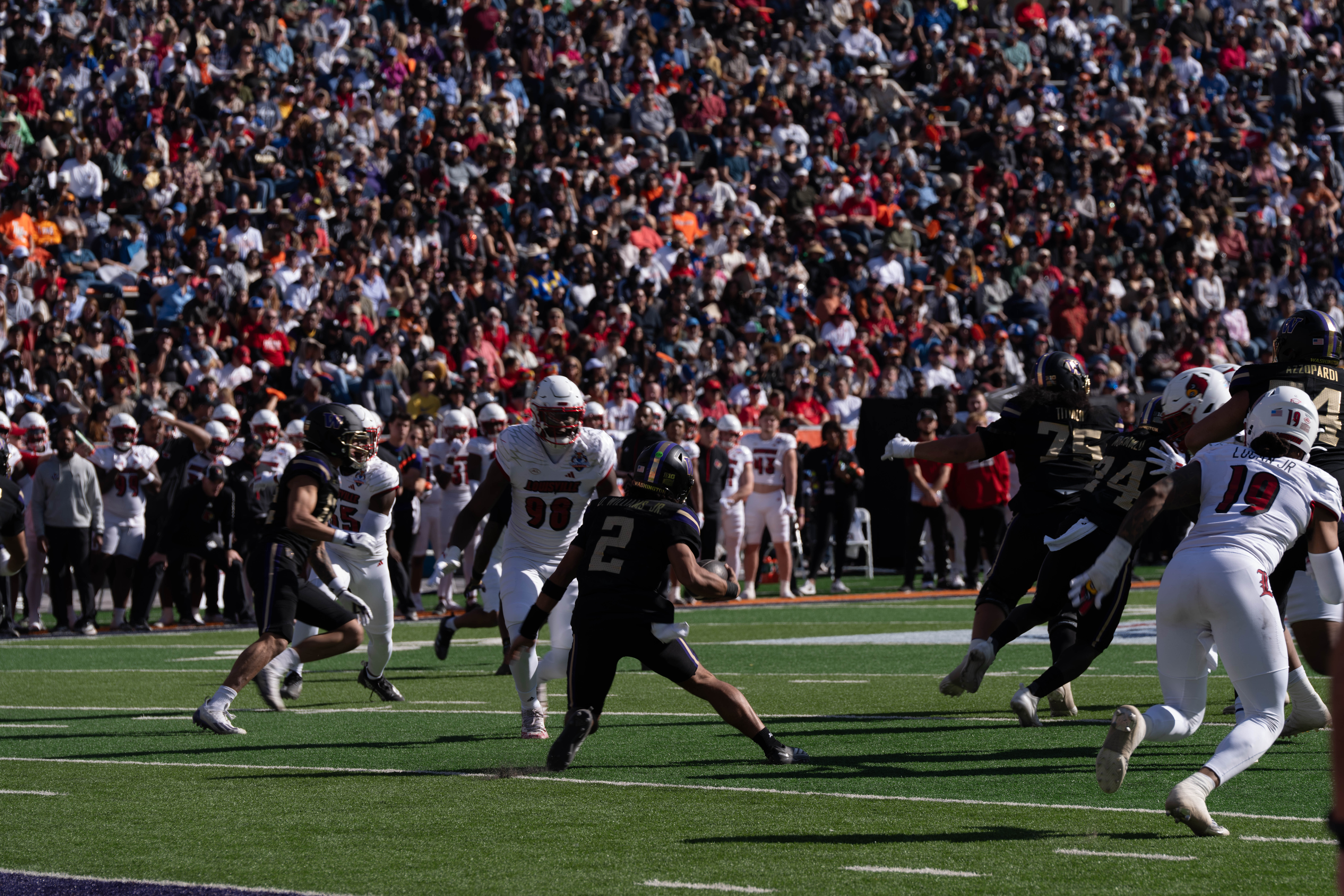
View from the field during the 2024 Sun Bowl

== See also ==
- List of NCAA Division I FBS football stadiums

Events and tenants
Preceded by Kidd Field	Home of the Sun Bowl; 1963–present	Succeeded by Current
Preceded by Kidd Field	Home of the UTEP Miners; 1963–present	Succeeded by Current
