= Jim Senter (athletic director) =

American college sports administrator

Current position
- Title: Athletic director
- Team: UTEP
- Conference: Mountain West

Biographical details
- Born: November 9, 1961 (age 65); Doylestown, Pennsylvania, U.S.
- Education: Tulsa (1985)

Coaching career (HC unless noted)
- 1981–1982: Coffeyville (SA)
- 1983–1985: Tulsa (SA)
- 1986–1992: Idaho (DB/LB)
- 1995–1996: Idaho (assistant)

Administrative career (AD unless noted)
- 2000–2003: Idaho (associate AD)
- 2003–2004: Idaho State
- 2004–2006: San Diego State (associate AD)
- 2006–2014: Colorado (associate AD)
- 2014–2017: The Citadel
- 2017–present: UTEP

Jim Senter (born November 9, 1961) is an American college sports administrator, currently serving as the athletic director (AD) at the University of Texas at El Paso. Previously from 2014 to 2017, Senter held the same position at The Citadel.

While studying at Coffeyville Community College, Senter served as a student assistant on the powerhouse junior college football program. He then served in the same role at Tulsa for three seasons before completing his degree in physical education. He coached for eight seasons at Idaho.

Senter began his administrative career as an associate athletic director at Idaho, before spending one academic year as AD at Idaho State. He also spent two seasons as associate AD at San Diego State and eight years at Colorado before assuming the AD role at The Citadel.

On November 22, 2017, The University of Texas at El Paso announced they had hired Senter to be their new Athletics Director. He will serve as their new athletic director while splitting time at The Citadel until he transitions completely in mid December 2017. Senter officially began at UTEP on December 18, 2017. Since he was hired, Senter's football hires are 26-78 overall, 14-53 in conference play in the C-USA and Mountain West and has not produced a winning record in conference play.
