= 1963 Wichita Shockers football team =

American college football season

1963 Wichita Shockers football

MVC Co-Champion
- Conference: Missouri Valley Conference
- Record: 7–2 (3–1 MVC)
- Head coach: Marcelino Huerta (2nd season)
- Home stadium: Veterans Field

1963 Missouri Valley Conference football standings
	Conf.					Overall
Team	W		L		T	W		L		T
Wichita +	3	–	1	–	0	7	–	2	–	0
Cincinnati +	3	–	1	–	0	6	–	4	–	0
Tulsa	2	–	2	–	0	5	–	5	–	0
North Texas State	2	–	2	–	0	3	–	6	–	0
Louisville	1	–	3	–	0	3	–	7	–	0
+ – Conference co-champions; Cincinnati and Louisville's games against Dayton counted in the conference standings.

The 1963 Wichita Shockers football team was an American football team that represented Wichita University (now known as Wichita State University) as a member of the Missouri Valley Conference during the 1963 NCAA University Division football season. In its second season under head coach Marcelino Huerta, the Shockers compiled an overall record of 7–2 record with a mark of 3–1 in conference play, sharing the MVC title with Cincinnati, and outscored opponents 233 to 117. The team played home games at Veterans Field, now known as Cessna Stadium, in Wichita, Kansas.

Pro Football Hall of Fame coach Bill Parcells was a senior linebacker on the team.

== Schedule ==
Date	Opponent	Site	Result	Attendance	Source
September 21	at Arizona State*	Sun Devil Stadium; Tempe, AZ	W 33–13	31,592	
September 28	at Boston College*	Alumni Stadium; Chestnut Hill, MA	L 16–22	22,000	
October 12	Hardin–Simmons*	Veterans Field; Wichita, KS	W 26–12	15,720	
October 19	at Louisville	Fairgrounds Stadium; Louisville, KY	W 47–14	6,196	
October 26	at North Texas State	Fouts Field; Denton, TX	L 3–7	14,000	
November 2	at New Mexico State*	Memorial Stadium; Las Cruces, NM	W 47–7	9,000	
November 9	Dayton*^{†}	Veterans Field; Wichita, KS	W 12–7	10,089	
November 16	Cincinnati	Veterans Field; Wichita, KS	W 23–20	11,589	
November 30	Tulsa	Veterans Field; Wichita, KS	W 26–15	9,830	
*Non-conference game; ^{†}Homecoming; Source:
