= University of Texas at El Paso =

Public university in El Paso, Texas, US

Coordinates: 31°46′12″N 106°30′18″W

The University of Texas at El Paso
- Former names: State School of Mines and Metallurgy (1913–1919); Department of Mines and Metallurgy of University of Texas (1919–1921); College of Mines and Metallurgy of the University of Texas (1921–1949); Texas Western College of the University of Texas (1949–1966); Texas Western College of The University of Texas at El Paso (1966)
- Motto: Scientia et Humanitas (Latin)
- Motto in English: "Knowledge and Refinement"
- Type: Public research university
- Established: April 16, 1913; 113 years ago
- Parent institution: University of Texas System
- Accreditation: SACS
- Academic affiliations: CONAHEC; Space-grant
- Endowment: $386.8 million (FY2024) (UTEP only) $47.47 billion (FY2024) (system-wide)
- Budget: $627.3 million (FY2025)
- President: Heather Wilson
- Faculty: 1,414 (fall 2023)
- Administrative staff: 414 (fall 2024)
- Total staff: 4,462 (fall 2024)
- Students: 27,368 (fall 2026)
- Undergraduates: 23,082 (fall 2026)
- Postgraduates: 4,286 (fall 2026)
- Location: El Paso, Texas, United States
- Campus: 366 acres (1.48 km^{2}); Large City
- Newspaper: The Prospector
- Colors: Dark blue, orange, and silver accent
- Nickname: Miners
- Sporting affiliations: NCAA Division I FBS – Mountain West
- Mascot: Paydirt Pete
- Website: www.utep.edu

The University of Texas at El Paso (UTEP) is a public research university in El Paso, Texas, United States. Founded in 1913 as the State School of Mines and Metallurgy, it is the third oldest academic component of the University of Texas System.

UTEP is an "R1: Doctoral Universities – Very high research activity" institution on the Carnegie Classification of Institutions of Higher Education.

The campus is located on hillsides overlooking the Rio Grande river, with Ciudad Juárez in view across the Mexico–United States border. It includes the Sun Bowl stadium, which hosts the annual college football competition the Sun Bowl every winter. Multiple campus buildings are in the Dzong architectural style, typical of Bhutan and Tibet.

== History ==
=== Early history ===
College of Mines seal

On April 16, 1913, SB 183 was signed by the Texas governor allocating funding for a new educational institution that would later become UTEP, making it the second oldest academic institution in the University of Texas system. The school officially opened on September 28, 1914, with 27 students in buildings belonging to the former El Paso Military Institute on a site adjacent to Fort Bliss on the Lanoria Mesa. The school was founded in 1913 as the State School of Mines and Metallurgy, and a practice mineshaft survives on the campus. By 1916, enrollment had grown to 39 students, including its first two female students, Ruth Brown and Grace Odell.

On October 29, 1916, a devastating fire destroyed the main building of the school, prompting its relocation. In 1917, the new school facility was constructed on its present site above Mundy Heights at the Paso del Norte, with the land donated by several El Paso residents. In a period when United States architects were designing in styles adopted especially from Europe, Kathleen Worrell, wife of the university's dean, was attracted by photographs of the Kingdom of Bhutan in a 1914 issue of National Geographic magazine, which showed the dzong architecture style of its Buddhist monasteries. The resemblances between the local terrain and mountainous features of Bhutan inspired her to propose designing early buildings of the mining school in the dzong style. Liking its distinctiveness, administrations have continued to choose that style for additional facilities, including the Sun Bowl football stadium and parking garages. Dzong architecture has characteristics such as sloping sides, markedly overhanging roofs, and bands of colored decoration.

The University of Texas Board of Regents changed the name of the institution in 1919 first to the Department of Mines and Metallurgy and then to the College of Mines and Metallurgy of the University of Texas (TCM) in 1920. The school's name was changed again in 1949 to Texas Western College of The University of Texas (TWC) or simply Texas Western College.

Notable events at UTEP include the training in 1961 of the nation's first Peace Corps class, the construction of Sun Bowl Stadium in 1963, and the winning of the 1966 NCAA basketball tournament.

=== The University of Texas at El Paso ===
When the 60th Texas State Legislature designated the University of Texas as The University of Texas System in 1967, the name of the school was changed to The University of Texas at El Paso. While the 1967 law designated "U.T. El Paso" as the school's official abbreviated name, the school is more commonly referred to by its trademarked name of "UTEP". Known as the Miners since the school's opening in 1914, TCM's students painted a large "M" for Miners on the Franklin Mountains in 1923; this was later moved to a site adjacent to the Sun Bowl Stadium in the 1960s where it remains today.

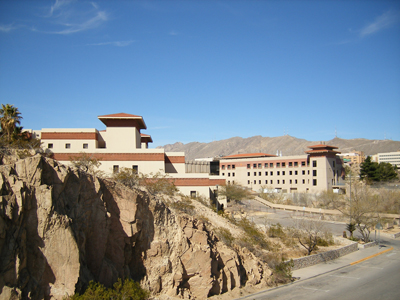
Buildings modeled after Bhutanese monasteries, or dzongs. To the left is the College of Business Administration, to the right the College of Engineering

The school has had achievements in academic and sports areas. In 1969, UTEP won the first of seven NCAA Men's Cross Country Championships. In 1974, UTEP's first doctoral degree program in Geological Sciences was approved. Also in 1974, UTEP won the first of seven NCAA Men's Indoor Track and Field Championships. In 1975 UTEP won both the NCAA Men's Outdoor and Indoor National Championships. UTEP is only one of a handful of universities to win at least 21 NCAA national championships in multiple sports.

The campus expanded in 1976 with the completion of the Engineering-Science Complex. That same year, the College of Nursing was founded. In 1977, the Special Events Center (now the Don Haskins Center) was built, featuring a 12,000-seat capacity for sporting events, live concerts, and other performances. An expansion of Sun Bowl Stadium followed in 1982, increasing its capacity to 52,000. The six-story University Library opened its doors to the public for the first time in 1984.

In 1988, Diana Natalicio became UTEP's first woman president. When she stepped down in August 2019, she was the longest-serving sitting president of a major public research university. In 1989, UTEP's second doctoral program was approved (in electrical engineering). Doctoral programs in computer engineering, psychology, and environmental science and engineering followed in 1991, 1993, and 1995, respectively. The university's cooperative pharmacy and nursing doctorate programs began in 1996 and 2000, respectively. A biological sciences doctorate program was started in 1997 and a history doctorate followed in 1999. Doctoral programs in international business, civil engineering, and rhetoric and composition were started in 2003.

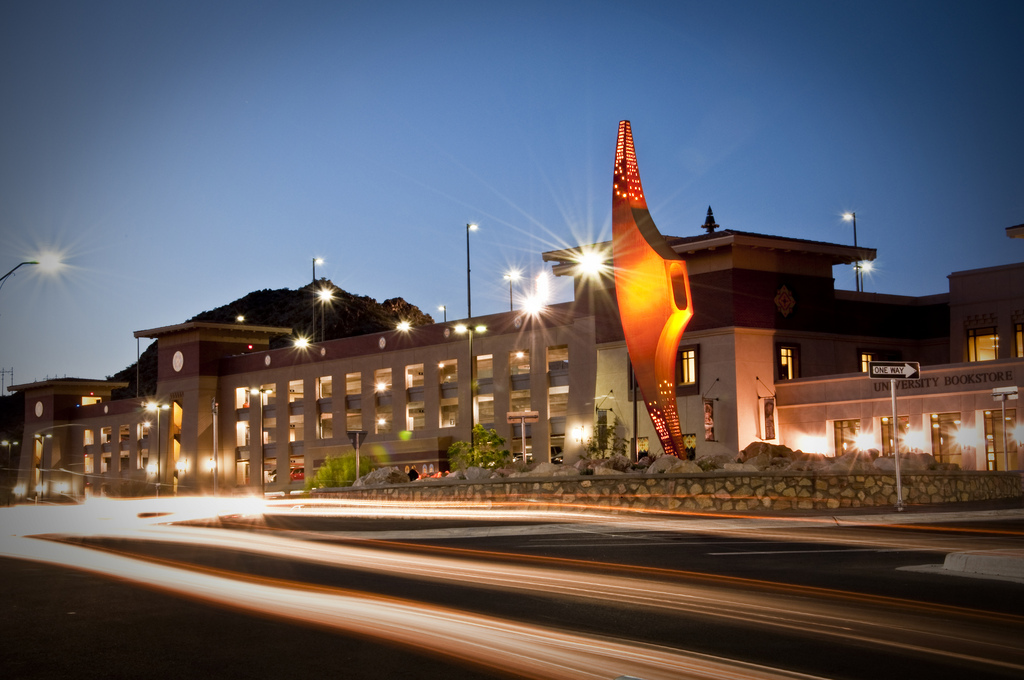
"Mining Minds" by Michael Clapper, a 25-foot tall pickaxe sculpture

In 1999, UTEP launched its MBA online degree program. It was designated as a Comprehensive Doctoral/Research-Intensive University by the Carnegie Foundation the following year. In 2002, the $11 million Larry K. Durham Sports Center opened and the Sam Donaldson Center for Communication Studies was established. The Academic Services and Biosciences buildings as well as the Engineering-Science complex in 2003. UTEP celebrated its 90th anniversary the next year with the Miners football team going to the Houston Bowl, and the men's basketball team made its 15th NCAA tournament appearance.

In August 2019, Heather Wilson became UTEP's 11th president. She previously served as the Secretary of the U.S. Air Force.

In June 2023 the university was placed on "Warning" status by its accreditor, the Southern Association of Colleges and Schools, after the accreditor's board found significant non-compliance with its standards for full-time faculty employment, program availability, qualified administrative staff, and academic program coordination.

== Academics and research ==
Academic rankings

National
- Forbes: 280
- U.S. News & World Report: 266 (tie)
- Washington Monthly: 134
- WSJ/College Pulse: 320

Global
- ARWU: 801-900
- QS: 1,201-1,400
- THE: 801-1,000
- U.S. News & World Report: 1,134 (tie)

Undergraduate demographics as of Fall 2023
Race and ethnicity	Total
Hispanic	88%
International student	4%
White	4%
Black	2%
Asian	1%
Two or more races	1%
Unknown	1%
Economic diversity
Low-income (Note: The percentage of students who received an income-based federal Pell grant intended for low-income students.)	60%
Affluent (Note: The percentage of students who are a part of the American middle class at the bare minimum.)	40%

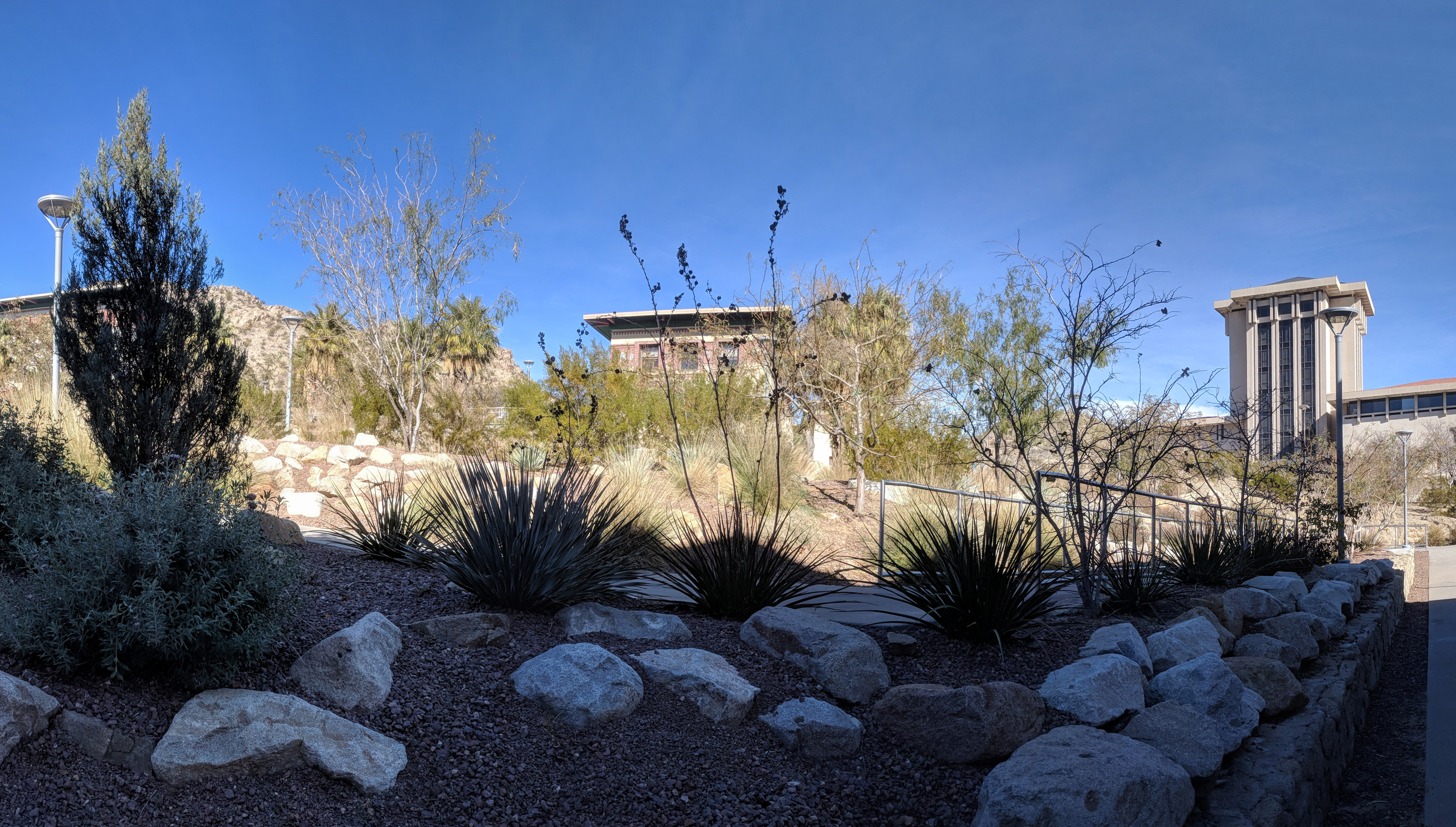
A portion of the campus

The University of Texas at El Paso is subdivided into nine colleges and schools, each of which offers a variety of degree programs including undergraduate, graduate, and post-graduate. UTEP offers 74 undergraduate degrees, 76 master's-level degrees, and 22 doctoral degrees. UTEP follows a semester system with a spring, summer, and fall semester annually, along with a shorter wintermester in the month of January.

UTEP offers the USA's only bilingual M.F.A. creative writing program.

UTEP reported $145.7 million in research and development expenditures for fiscal year 2023. UTEP is classified as an "R1: Research University (Highest research activity)" in the Carnegie Classification of Institutions of Higher Education.

== Campus architecture ==
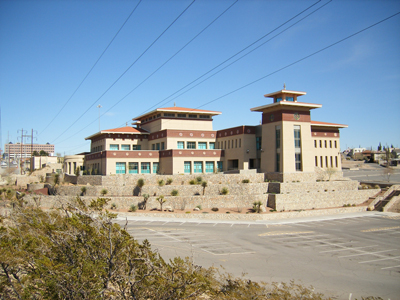
Academic Services Building

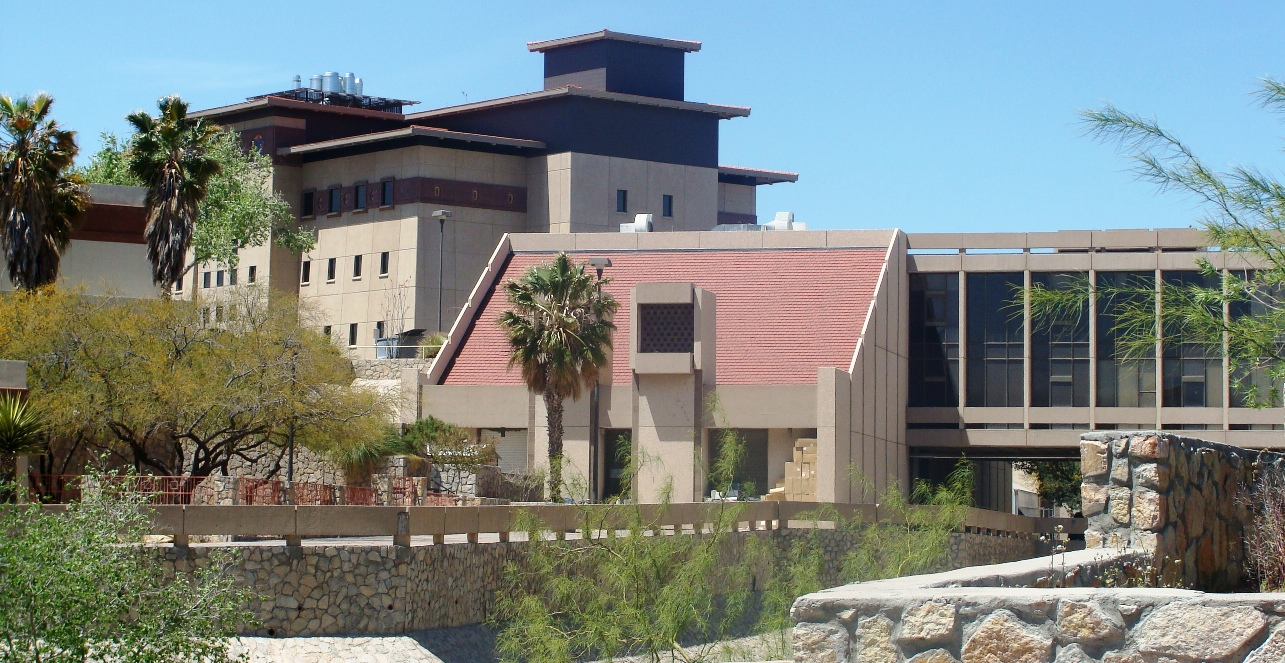
University of Texas at El Paso

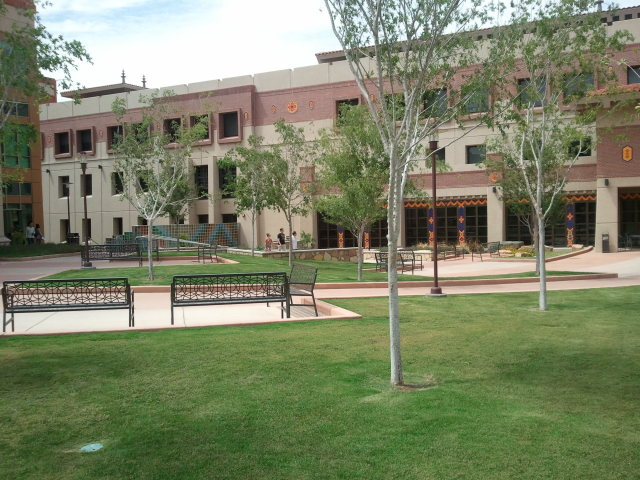
College of Engineering complex area

In 1916, only two years after the school opened, the original campus buildings were destroyed in a fire. The school was rebuilt on its present site in 1917. Kathleen Worrell, the wife of the school's first dean, Steve H. Worrell, had seen pictures of Bhutanese buildings in an April 1914 issue of National Geographic. Noting the similarity of mountainous Bhutan (which is in the Himalayas) to the location of the campus, she suggested the new buildings be built in the style of Bhutanese dzongs (monastic fortresses), with massive sloping walls and overhanging roofs. This idea was enthusiastically accepted by all.

El Paso architect Charles Gisbon of the firm Gibson and Robertson originated the Bhutanese Revival building designs. However, the school's governing board purchased the designs and awarded them to prominent El Paso architect Henry Trost. Since then, all buildings through 1950 have followed this style, including those designed by Trost's successor, Percy McGhee. In 2024, the student body voted to demolish one of the original Bhutanese Revival buildings under a new campus master plan, which called for razing several more historic structures through 2034.

The Kingdom of Bhutan has honored UTEP's adoption of their country's style. Prince Jigyel Ugyen Wangchuk has visited the campus, and in 2009 the Kingdom presented UTEP with a hand-carved wooden temple to be erected on the campus.

The Himalayan style of UTEP's campus made it an appropriate site for the Chenrezig Himalayan Cultural Center of El Paso, a Tibetan Buddhist facility.

== School colors and logo ==
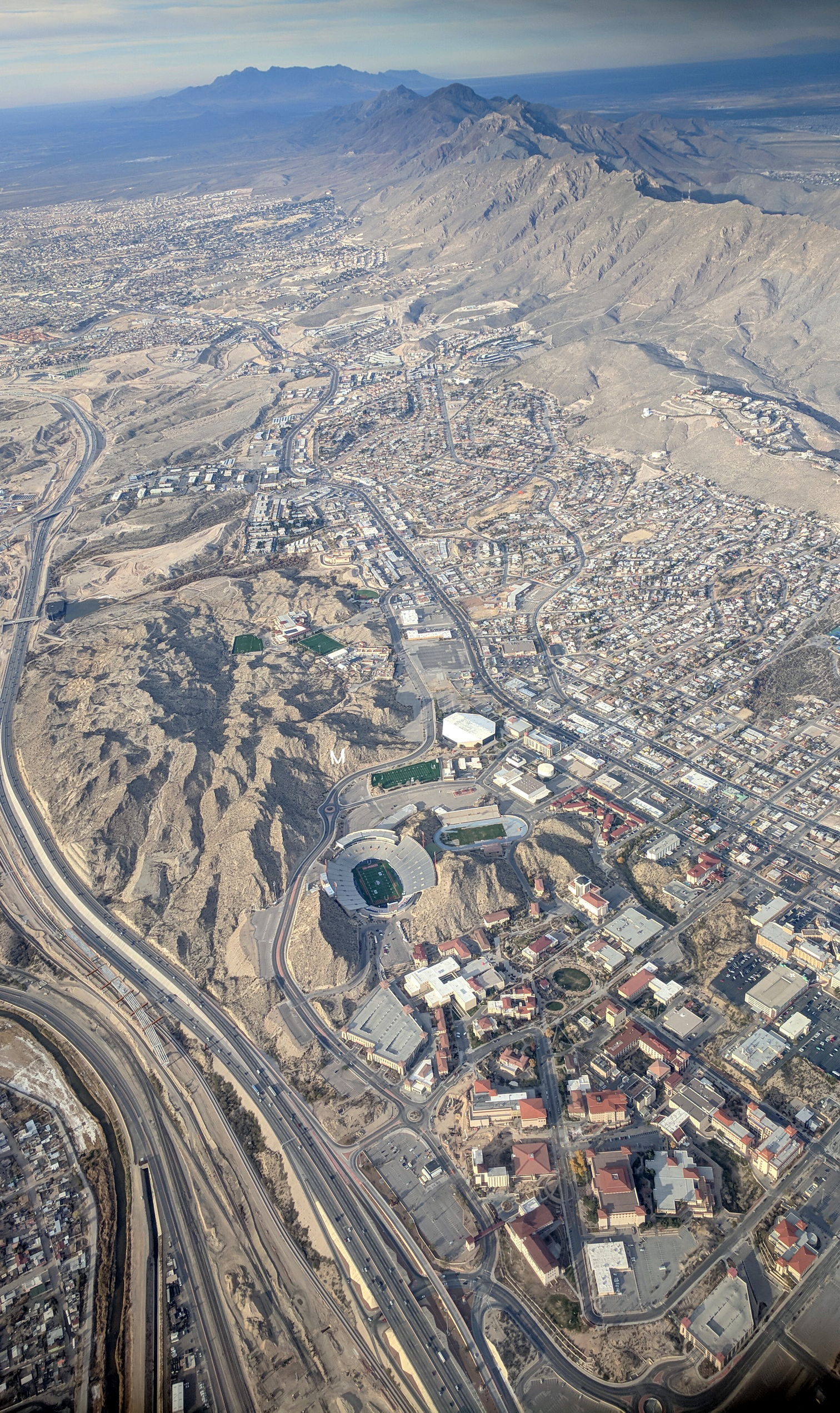
Aerial view of the entire UTEP campus, situated between the US–Mexico border at lower left and the west side and Franklin Mountains of El Paso at the upper right. The Organ Mountains near Las Cruces, New Mexico, are visible in the distance.

Since the school was established as a department of the main branch of the University of Texas at Austin, the school's colors were originally orange and white. However, in the early 1980s, Columbia blue was added so now the official colors are orange, white, and blue. When the new UTEP athletic department logo was introduced in the fall of 1999, a darker hue of blue was incorporated into the logo, as well as a silver accent to go with the customary orange.

== Athletics ==
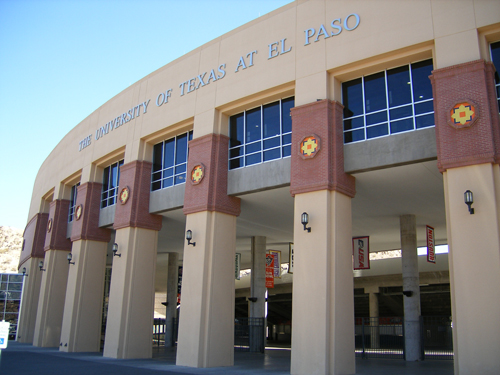
Larry K. Durham Sports Center

UTEP was the first college in the American South to integrate its intercollegiate sports programs. This change was made in the 1950s. When Don Haskins became basketball coach in 1961, he aggressively recruited black players. In 1966, Haskins' Miners won the NCAA basketball championship, defeating an all-white Kentucky team, 72–65 in the championship game. The Miners finished the season with a 28–1 record. At a time when many claimed black players lacked the mental and emotional "necessities" to compete at a high level, Haskins put his usual starting players in the championship game. They were the first all-black team to start in a game at that level. This story was retold in Haskins' autobiography Glory Road (2005) and in the 2006 film Glory Road, a production with a few historical errors, such as a game at Commerce, Texas that never occurred. Haskins coached his entire career at UTEP and compiled a 719–353 record with only five losing seasons. He was inducted into the Basketball Hall of Fame in 1997, and the special events center was renamed the Don Haskins Center. He retired from coaching in 1999, and died in 2008. The entire 1966 UTEP team was inducted into the Hall of Fame in 2007.

In 1968, the UTEP track & field program revoked the scholarships of eight black athletes after they boycotted a meet at Brigham Young University in protest of perceived racism at BYU and in the Church of Jesus Christ of Latter-day Saints of the era. This included future gold medal winner and world record long jump holder Bob Beamon, who would briefly return to the school after the incident but not graduate. The coach at the time later regretted his actions, and felt that he and the school acted hastily.

UTEP's sports programs have won a total of 21 NCAA Division I national championships. UTEP is tied for 10th overall among schools in Men's Sports Division I championships.

- Men's basketball: 1 (1966; the first of two NCAA men's basketball titles won by a university from the state of Texas)
- Men's cross country: 7 (an eighth title was vacated by the NCAA following the championship)
- Men's indoor track & field: 7
- Men's outdoor track & field: 6

UTEP owns the two largest venues in El Paso, Texas:

- Sun Bowl Stadium, seating capacity 51,500, opened its doors in 1963 and is the home to the UTEP football team and to the annual Sun Bowl game.
- Don Haskins Center, seating capacity 12,000, was built in 1976 and is primarily used by the men's and women's basketball teams. It is also known as "The Bear's Den" as well as "The Don." The arena is also used for concerts by mainstream artists.
- University Field (UTEP), seating capacity 500, was built in 1991 and hosts the women's soccer team.
- Kidd Field, seating capacity 15,000, home of UTEP Track and Field teams.

In 2005, UTEP moved to Conference USA from the Western Athletic Conference.

On December 10, 2012, it was announced that Sean Kugler would be taking over as the new UTEP football coach.

In 2010, Tim Floyd became the head basketball coach. He was a protege of Haskins and is a former coach at the University of New Orleans, the NBA's Chicago Bulls and New Orleans Hornets, and the University of Southern California. Floyd retired in 2017 due to recurring health issues and was succeeded by Rodney Terry, former head coach at CSU Fresno (Fresno State).

=== Pickaxe hand symbol ===
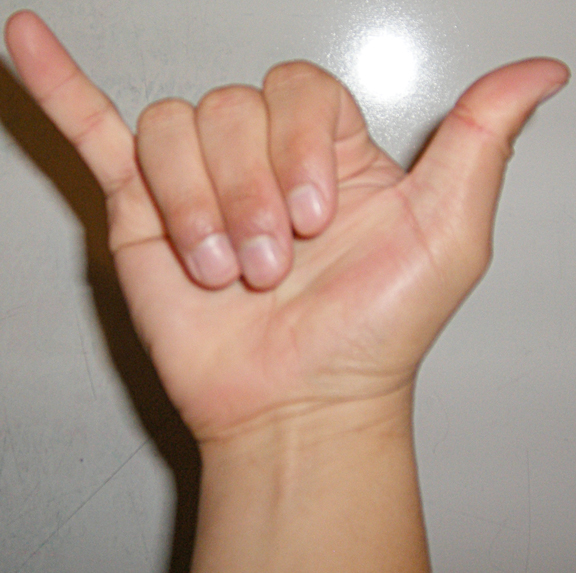
The Miner pickaxe hand symbol

This hand symbol represents the traditional tool used by miners, the pickaxe, and is similar to the shaka sign and the letter Y in American sign language. This gesture is made by UTEP fans when UTEP players are shooting free throws at basketball games, or any time UTEP kicks off at a football game. It originated during a cheer camp by the UTEP cheerleading squad during the early 1980s.

=== Nickname ===
The first reference to the nickname "Miners" is found in the February 1919 (volume 1, number 1) issue of the Prospector, the school's student newspaper. However, an earlier reference can be found in the handwritten bill (Senate Bill 183) that established the school in 1913, where the author, State Senator Claude Hudspeth, mistakenly wrote "Miners" instead of "Mines," and thus referred to the school as the "State School of Miners and Metallurgy." It is presumed the nickname "Miners" came from the fact the school was founded as the "State School of Mines and Metallurgy."

In doing research on this project, early mention of "Ore Diggers" and "Muckers" for the nickname was found, but nothing to determine if the name "Miners" was voted upon by the student body, or if a faculty member, John W. (Cap) Kidd, chose the name. Kidd was a booster of athletics, especially football, and in 1915, when funds were lean at the school, Kidd donated $800 to equip the football team, though there is no evidence other than anecdotal he contributed this amount. He also assisted with coaching, although he was not the head coach. The present track facility on campus, Kidd Field, bears Cap Kidd's name.

=== School songs ===
"The Eyes of Texas" was adopted by the 1920 student body after the song had been "declared the school anthem for the University of Texas at Austin".

UTEP's original fight song, "Miners Fight", was also borrowed from the Austin campus. With the permission of the estate of Marty Robbins, the UTEP Music Department in the late 1980s wrote new words to the melody of his Grammy Award-winning country-western hit "El Paso". This gave UTEP a fight song all its own, to a tune recognized across the nation.

=== Rivalries ===
New Mexico State University: UTEP has a strong rivalry with New Mexico State University, known as "The Battle of I-10". UTEP and NMSU are just over 40 miles apart.

== Notable people ==
Notable UTEP alumni include:

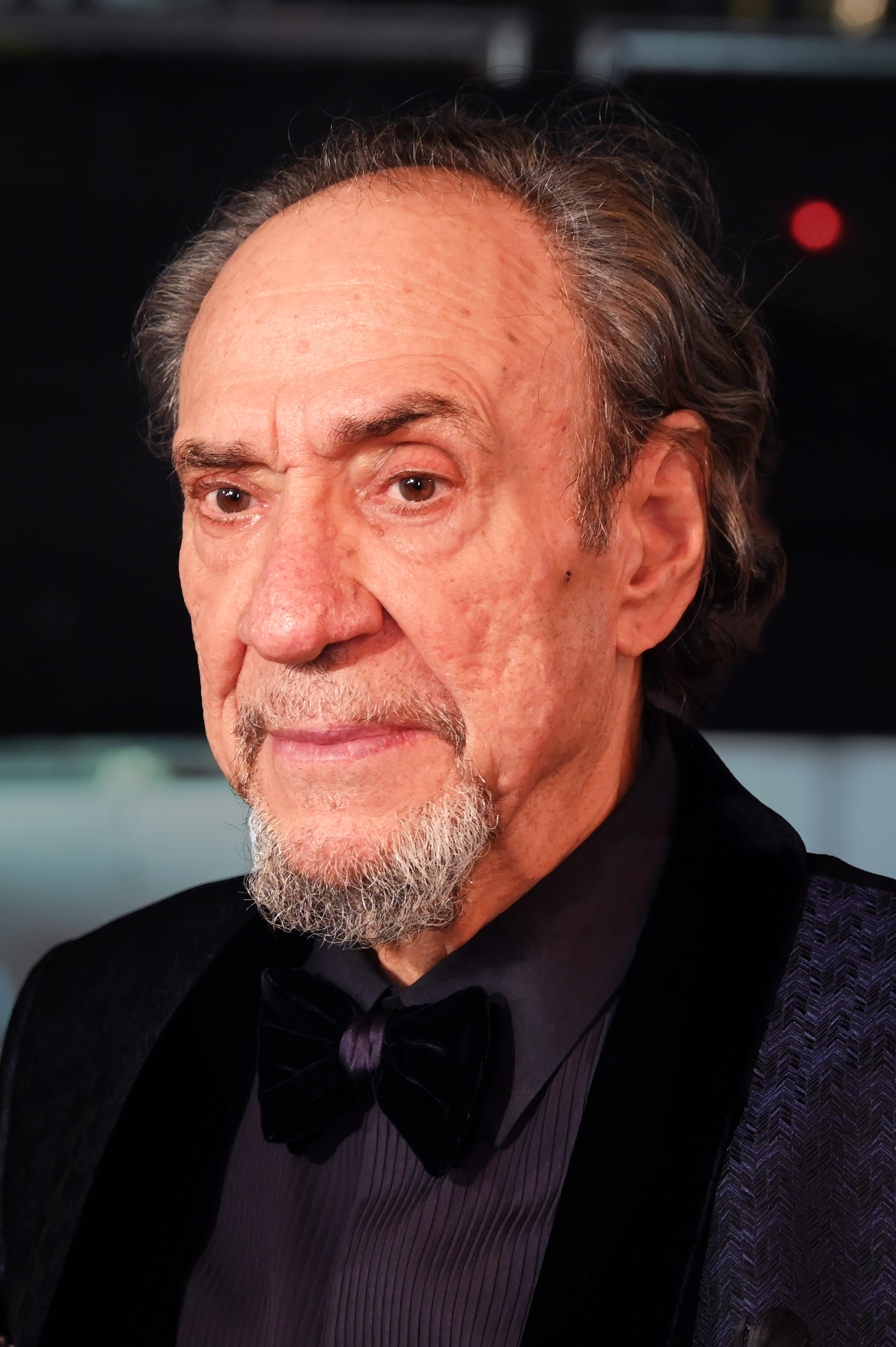
F. Murray Abraham
Academy Award-winning actor

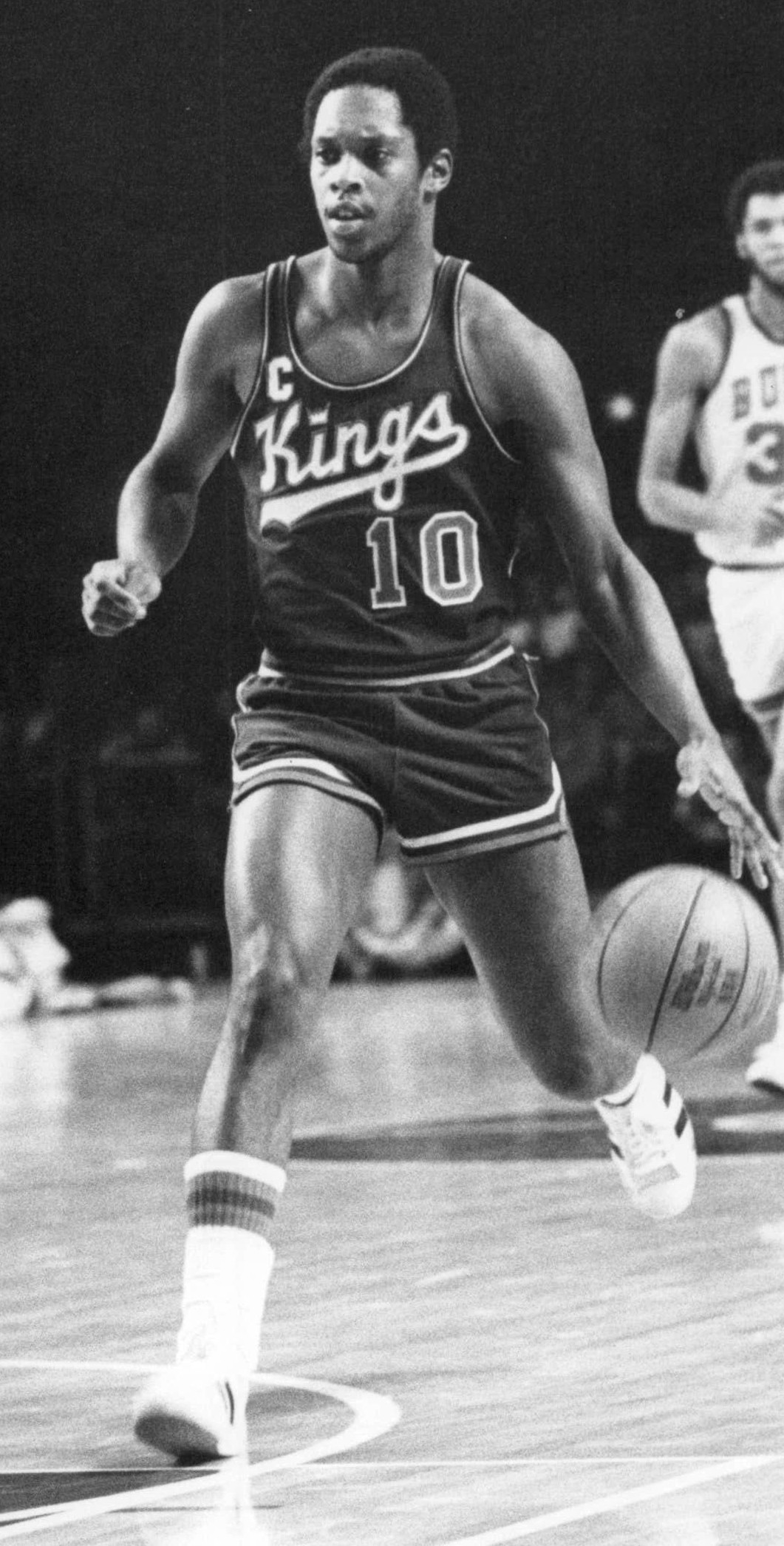
Nate Archibald
NBA Hall of Famer

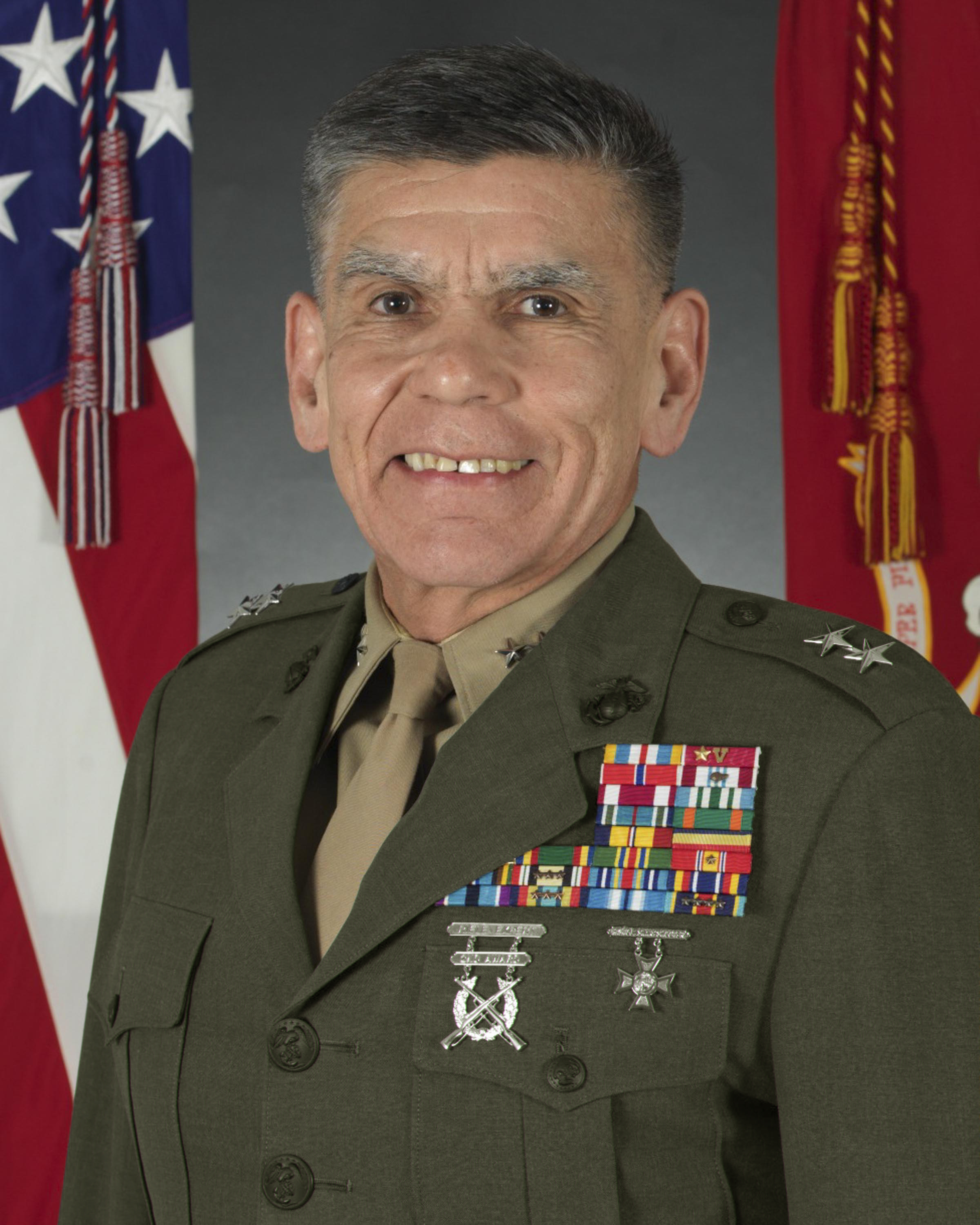
Juan G. Ayala
Major General, U.S. Marine Corps

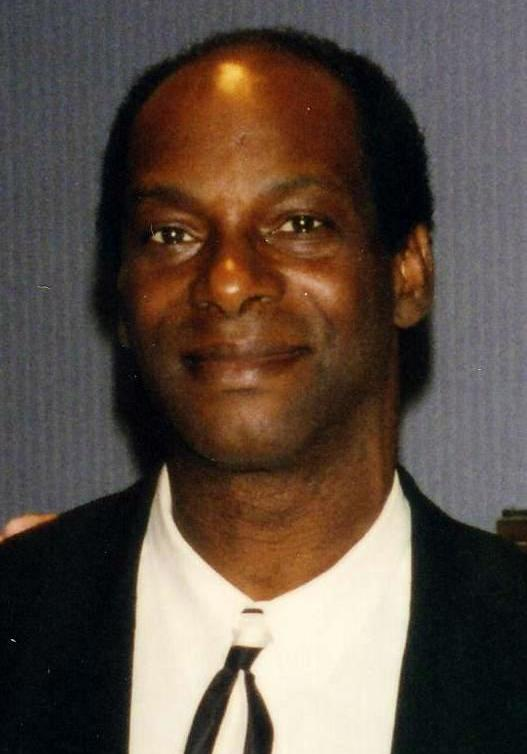
Bob Beamon
Olympic gold medalist & long jump world-record holder

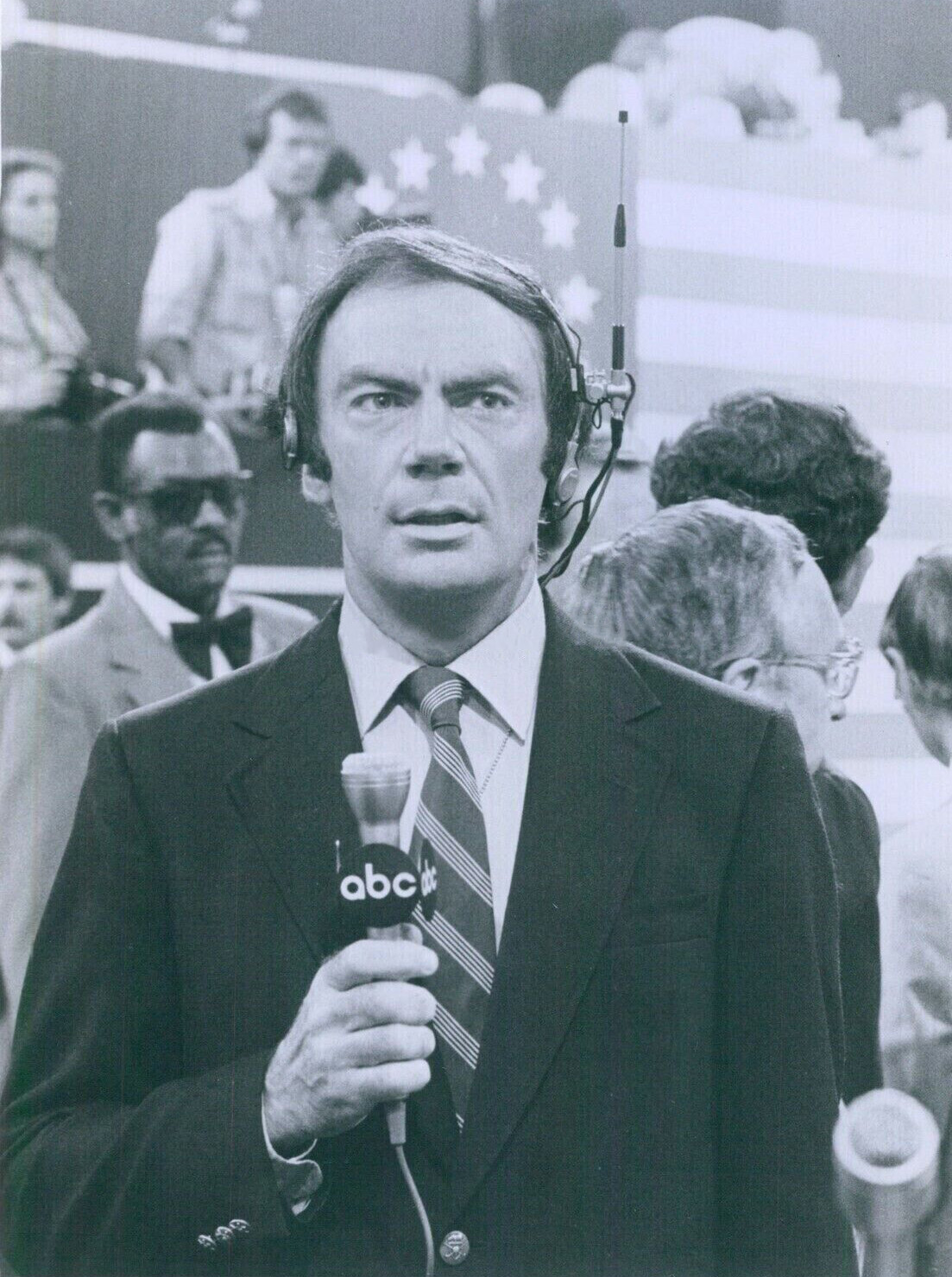
Sam Donaldson
ABC News journalist & White House correspondent

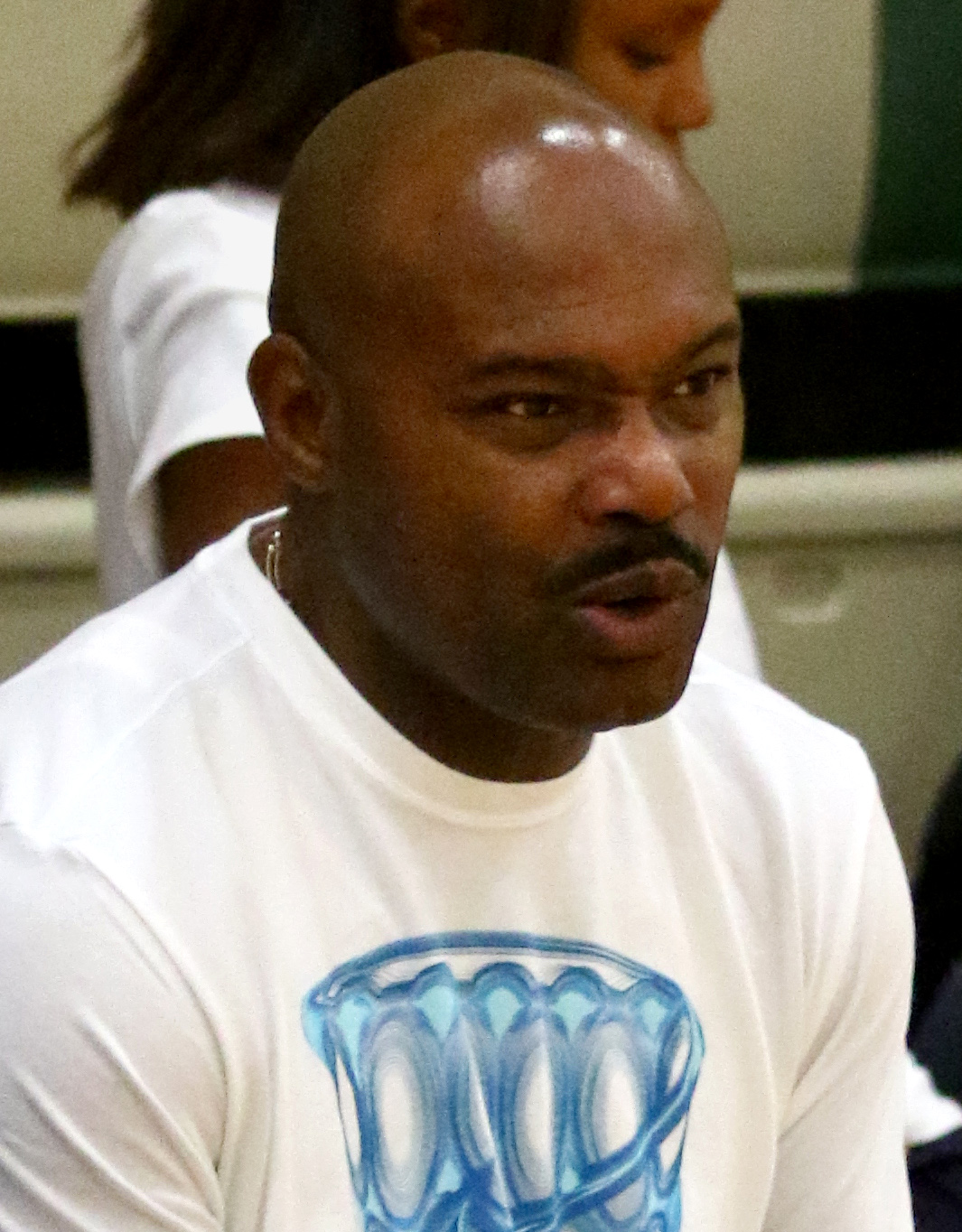
Tim Hardaway
NBA Hall of Famer

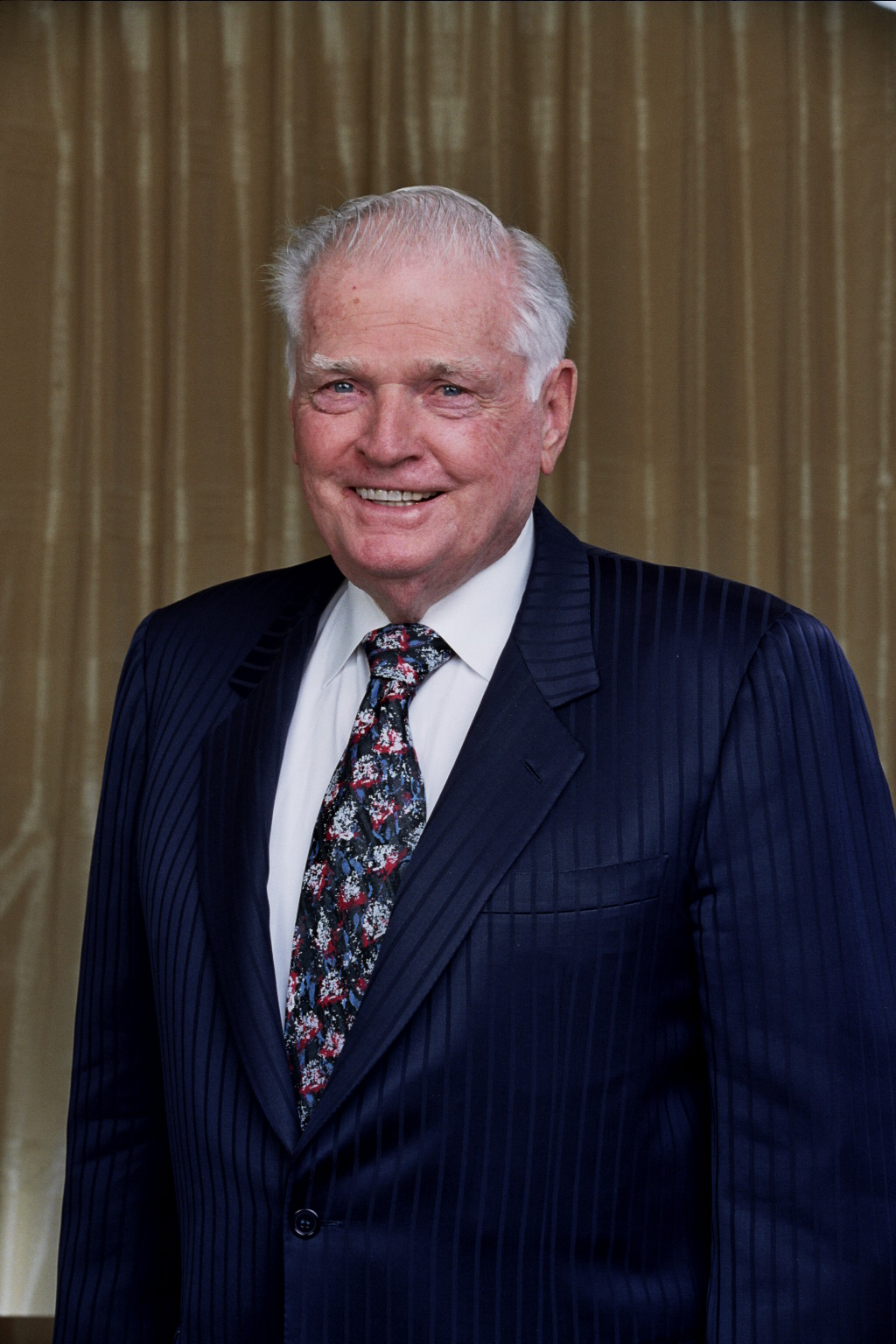
Eric Hilton
Former vice chairman of Hilton Hotels; member of Hilton family

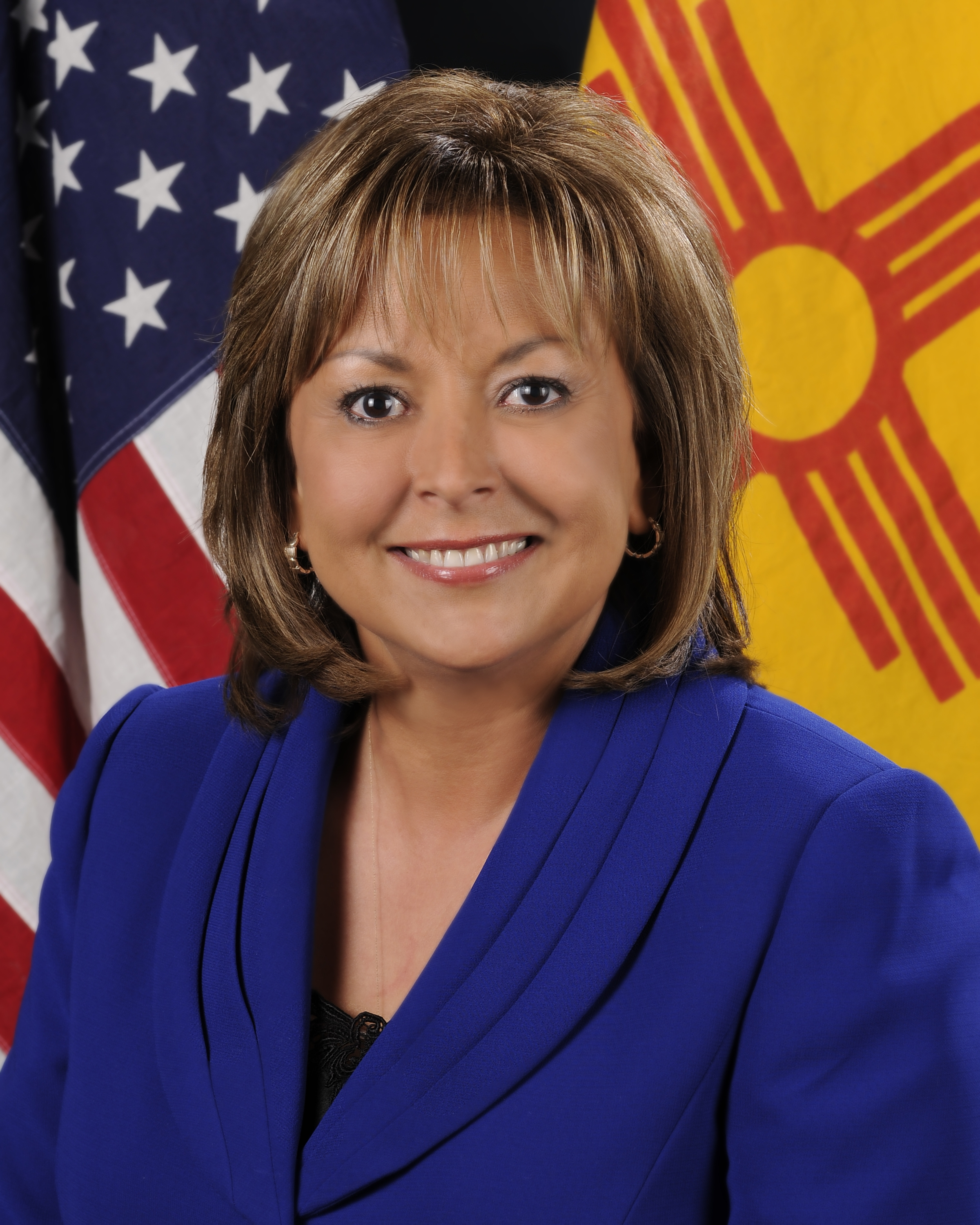
Susana Martinez
31st Governor of New Mexico

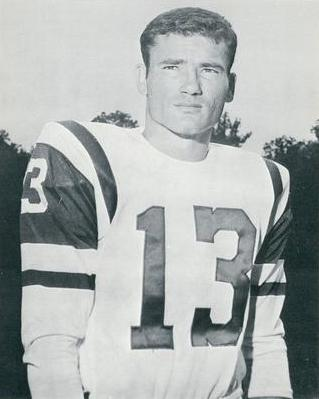
Don Maynard
Pro Football Hall of Famer

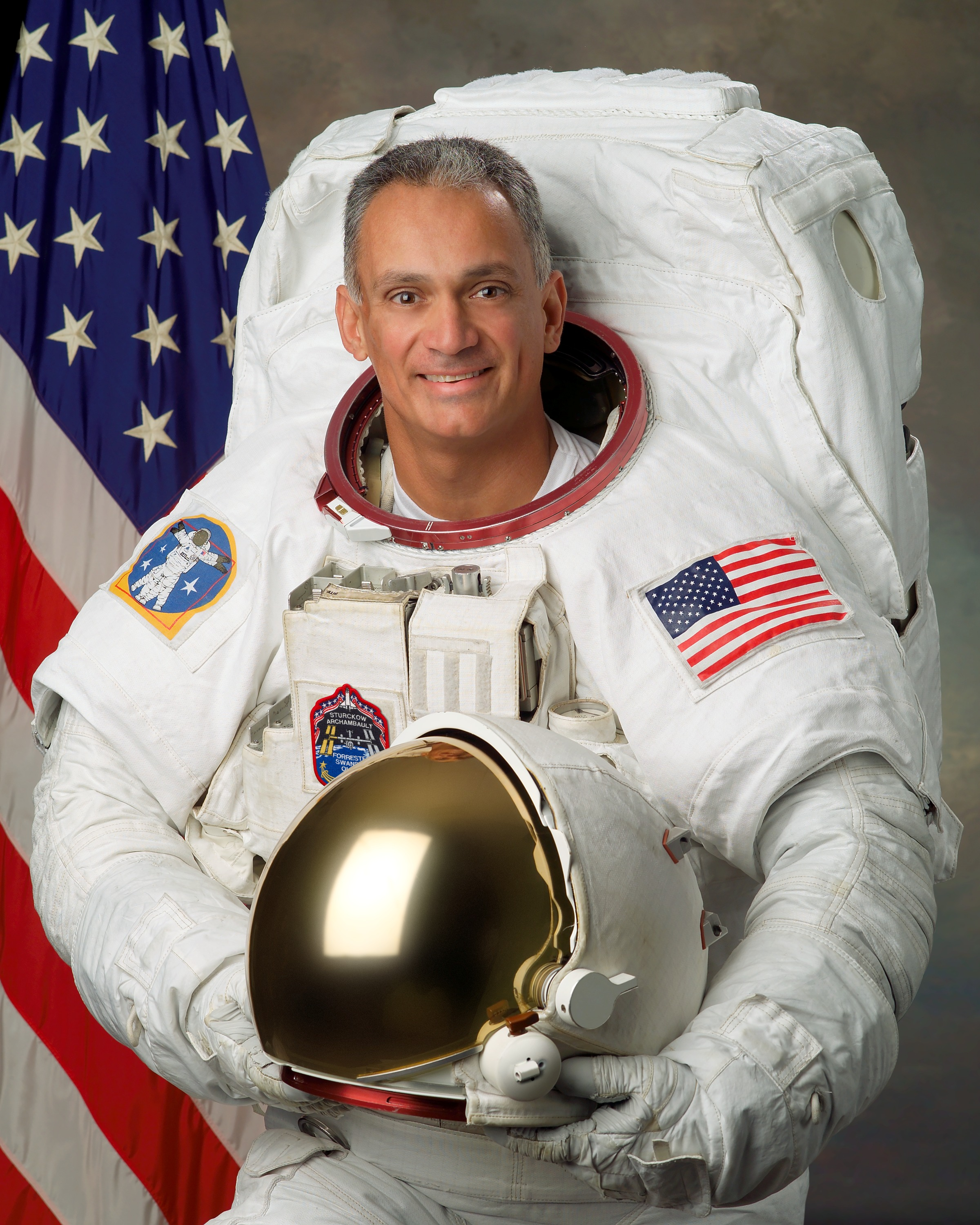
John D. Olivas
NASA astronaut

== Gallery ==
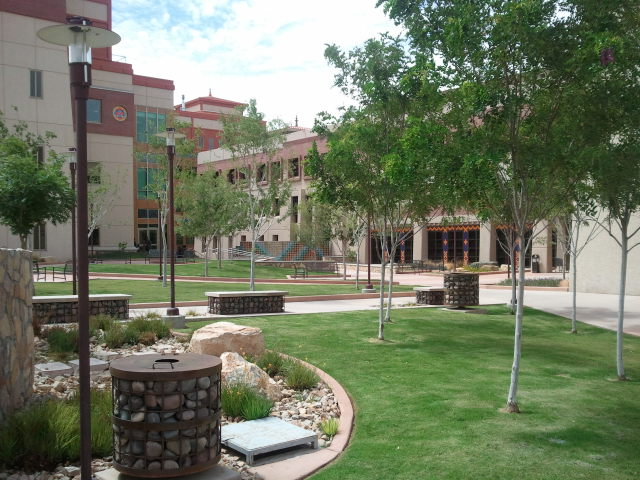
College of Engineering Department area

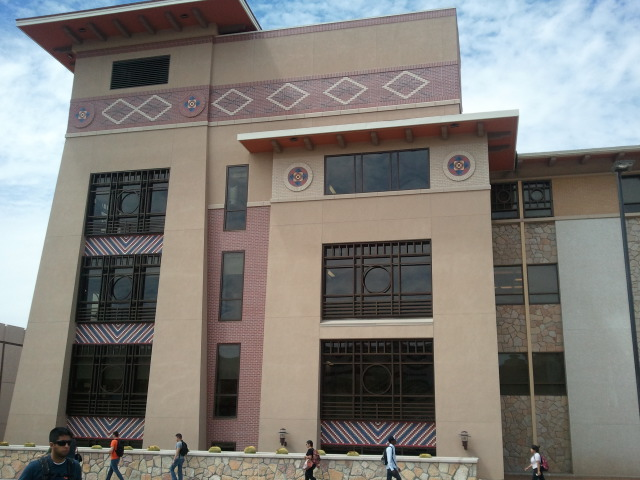
Physical Science Building

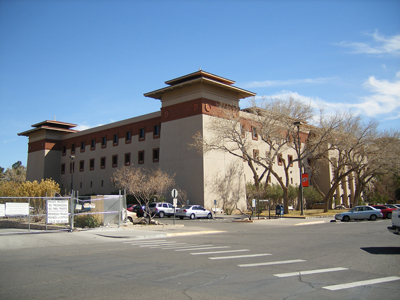
Library

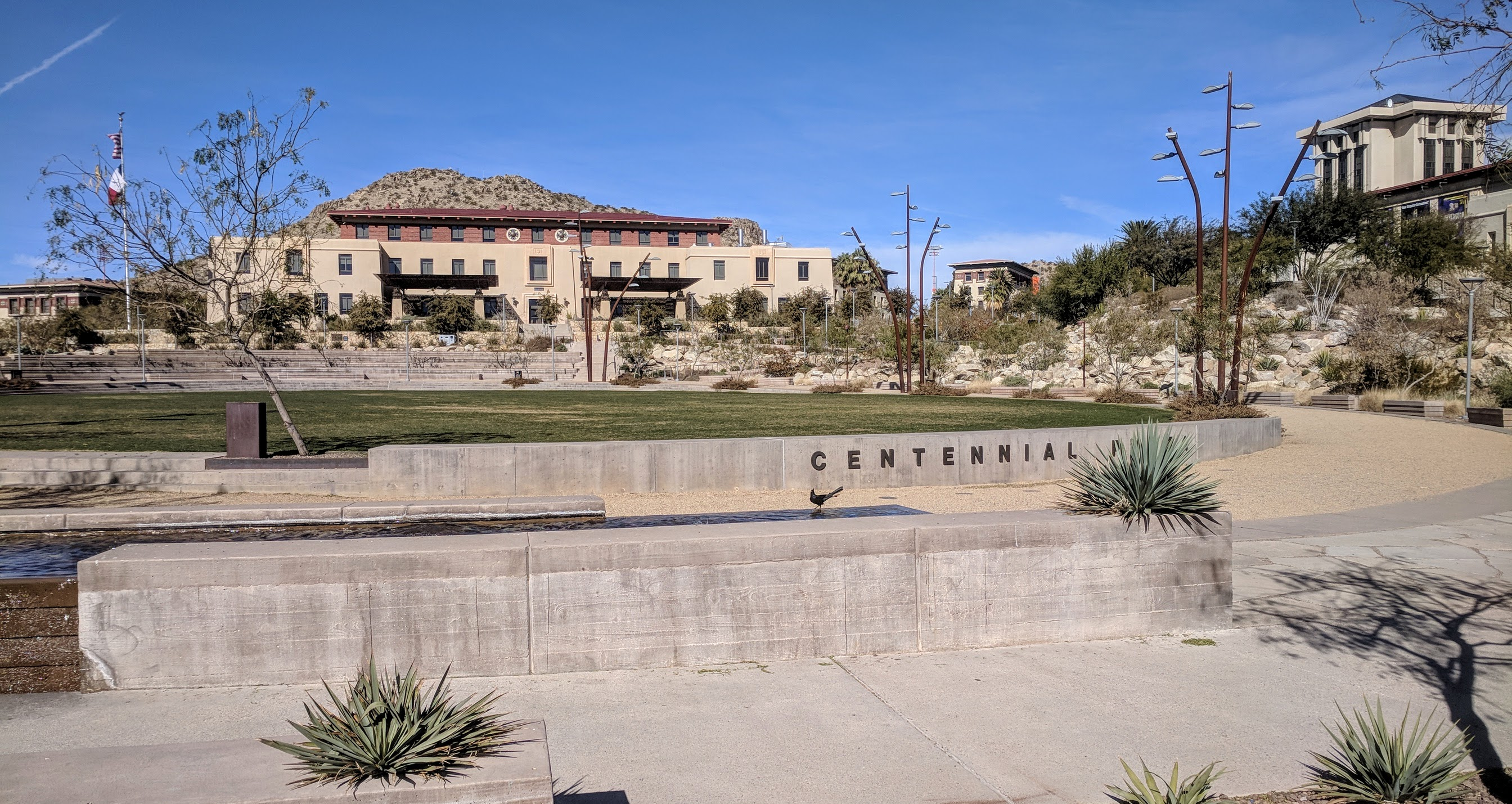
Centennial Plaza

== See also ==
- List of universities in Texas by enrollment
- History of Mexican Americans in Texas
