= North Carolina A&T Aggies football, 1960–1969 =

American college football seasons

The North Carolina A&T Aggies, 1960–1969 represented what is now North Carolina A&T State University as a member of the Central Intercollegiate Athletic Association (CIAA) during the decade of the 1960s. During this time, the Aggies were led by two different head coaches and had an overall record for the decade of 54–36–4. During this decade, A&T played their home games on campus at War Memorial Stadium in Greensboro, North Carolina.

Bert Piggott lead the Aggies from 1960 through their 1967 season to an overall record of 40–33–3 and to a CIAA championship in 1964. Piggott resigned after their 1967 season and was replaced by assistant coach Hornsby Howell. Howell led A&T through the end of the decade to an overall record of 14–3–1 and a share of the Black college football national championship in 1968.

== 1960 ==
1960 North Carolina A&T Aggies football
- Conference: Central Intercollegiate Athletic Association
- Record: 5–3–1 (4–1–1 CIAA)
- Head coach: Bert Piggott (4th season)
- Home stadium: World War Memorial Stadium

1960 Central Intercollegiate Athletic Association football standings
	Conf.					Overall
Team	W		L		T	W		L		T
Maryland State $	5	–	0	–	1	5	–	1	–	1
North Carolina A&T	4	–	1	–	1	5	–	3	–	1
North Carolina College	5	–	2	–	0	7	–	2	–	0
Winston-Salem State	5	–	1	–	0	6	–	2	–	0
Hampton	5	–	2	–	0	5	–	4	–	0
Virginia State	5	–	3	–	0	6	–	3	–	0
Johnson C. Smith	6	–	2	–	0	6	–	3	–	0
Morgan State	3	–	3	–	1	3	–	3	–	1
Delaware State	4	–	3	–	0	4	–	4	–	0
Virginia Union	3	–	4	–	1	4	–	5	–	1
St. Augustine's	4	–	4	–	0	4	–	5	–	0
Fayetteville State	2	–	4	–	0	3	–	5	–	0
Howard	2	–	4	–	0	4	–	4	–	0
Shaw	3	–	5	–	0	3	–	6	–	0
Saint Paul's (VA)	1	–	6	–	0	1	–	7	–	0
Elizabeth City State	1	–	7	–	0	1	–	7	–	0
Lincoln (PA)	0	–	6	–	0	0	–	7	–	0
$ – Conference champion

The 1960 North Carolina A&T Aggies football team represented the Agricultural and Technical College of North Carolina (now known as North Carolina A&T State University) as a member of the Central Intercollegiate Athletic Association (CIAA) during the 1960 college football season. Led by fourth-year head coach Bert Piggott, the Aggies compiled an overall record of 5–3–1, with a mark of 4–1–1 in conference play, and finished second in the CIAA.

Schedule

Date	Opponent	Site	Result	Attendance	Source
September 24	Tennessee A&I*	World War Memorial Stadium; Greensboro, NC	L 12–13	7,500	
October 1	at Shaw	Chavis Park; Raleigh, NC	W 40–19	4,500	
October 8	South Carolina State*	World War Memorial Stadium; Greensboro, NC (rivalry)	W 36–22	11,000–12,000	
October 15	at Maryland State	Princess Anne, MD	T 14–14	3,000	
October 22	Winston-Salem State	World War Memorial Stadium; Greensboro, NC (rivalry)	W 21–6	5,000	
October 29	Morgan State	World War Memorial Stadium; Greensboro, NC	W 33–6	12,500	
November 5	at No. 2 Florida A&M*	Bragg Memorial Stadium; Tallahassee, FL	L 19–49	6,000	
November 12	Virginia State	World War Memorial Stadium; Greensboro, NC	W 20–7	3,000	
November 24	at North Carolina College	Durham County Memorial Stadium; Durham, NC (rivalry)	L 13–14	8,000–10,000	
*Non-conference game; Rankings from AP Poll released prior to the game; Source:

== 1961 ==
1961 North Carolina A&T Aggies football
- Conference: Central Intercollegiate Athletic Association
- Record: 5–4 (5–1 CIAA)
- Head coach: Bert Piggott (5th season)
- Home stadium: World War Memorial Stadium

1961 Central Intercollegiate Athletic Association football standings
	Conf.					Overall
Team	W		L		T	W		L		T
North Carolina College $	5	–	0	–	2	7	–	0	–	2
North Carolina A&T	5	–	1	–	0	5	–	4	–	0
Johnson C. Smith	6	–	1	–	0	8	–	1	–	0
Winston-Salem State	5	–	1	–	1	6	–	1	–	1
Maryland State	2	–	2	–	1	4	–	2	–	1
Delaware State	5	–	2	–	0	7	–	3	–	0
Virginia Union	4	–	3	–	1	5	–	3	–	1
Morgan State	5	–	4	–	0	5	–	4	–	0
Virginia State	3	–	4	–	1	3	–	4	–	1
Hampton	3	–	3	–	0	6	–	3	–	0
Elizabeth City State	3	–	4	–	0	4	–	4	–	0
St. Augustine's	3	–	5	–	0	4	–	5	–	0
Fayetteville State	2	–	4	–	0	3	–	6	–	0
Howard	1	–	5	–	0	1	–	8	–	0
Shaw	1	–	8	–	0	1	–	8	–	0
Saint Paul's (VA)	0	–	6	–	0	0	–	8	–	0
$ – Conference champion

The 1961 North Carolina A&T Aggies football team represented the Agricultural and Technical College of North Carolina (now known as North Carolina A&T State University) as a member of the Central Intercollegiate Athletic Association (CIAA) during the 1961 college football season. Led by fifth-year head coach Bert Piggott, the Aggies compiled an overall record of 5–4, with a mark of 5–1 in conference play, and finished second in the CIAA.

Schedule

Date	Opponent	Site	Result	Attendance	Source
September 16	at Quantico Marines*	Butler Stadium; Quantico, VA	L 19–20		
September 23	at Tennessee A&I*	Hale Stadium; Nashville, TN	L 21–37	5,492–5,500	
September 30	Shaw	World War Memorial Stadium; Greensboro, NC	W 32–0	4,500	
October 14	Maryland State^{†}	World War Memorial Stadium; Greensboro, NC	W 20–7	11,000	
October 21	Winston-Salem State	World War Memorial Stadium; Greensboro, NC (rivalry)	W 27–20	10,000	
October 28	at Morgan State	Hughes Stadium; Baltimore, MD	W 19–7	9,500	
November 4	No. 7 Florida A&M*	World War Memorial Stadium; Greensboro, NC	L 12–32	12,000	
November 11	at Virginia State	Rogers Stadium; Ettrick, VA	W 28–27	2,500	
November 23	North Carolina College	World War Memorial Stadium; Greensboro, NC (rivalry)	L 0–13	9,000	
*Non-conference game; ^{†}Homecoming; Rankings from AP Poll released prior to the game; Source:

== 1962 ==
1962 North Carolina A&T Aggies football
- Conference: Central Intercollegiate Athletic Association
- Record: 7–3 (6–1 CIAA)
- Head coach: Bert Piggott (6th season)
- Home stadium: World War Memorial Stadium

1962 Central Intercollegiate Athletic Association football standings
	Conf.					Overall
Team	W		L		T	W		L		T
Morgan State $	8	–	1	–	0	8	–	2	–	0
North Carolina A&T	6	–	1	–	0	7	–	3	–	0
Johnson C. Smith	6	–	1	–	0	7	–	2	–	0
Virginia Union	7	–	2	–	0	7	–	2	–	0
Maryland State	2	–	2	–	1	4	–	2	–	1
North Carolina College	4	–	3	–	0	6	–	3	–	0
Fayetteville State	4	–	2	–	1	4	–	2	–	1
Elizabeth City State	2	–	3	–	3	2	–	3	–	3
Norfolk State	3	–	3	–	0	5	–	3	–	0
Virginia State	3	–	5	–	0	4	–	5	–	0
St. Augustine's	3	–	4	–	1	4	–	4	–	1
Delaware State	3	–	4	–	0	4	–	5	–	0
Winston-Salem State	2	–	5	–	0	3	–	6	–	0
Hampton	3	–	4	–	0	3	–	6	–	0
Livingstone	1	–	3	–	0	2	–	8	–	0
Saint Paul's (VA)	2	–	6	–	0	2	–	6	–	0
Shaw	1	–	7	–	1	1	–	7	–	1
Howard	0	–	6	–	0	1	–	8	–	0
$ – Conference champion

The 1962 North Carolina A&T Aggies football team represented the Agricultural and Technical College of North Carolina (now known as North Carolina A&T State University) as a member of the Central Intercollegiate Athletic Association (CIAA) during the 1962 NCAA College Division football season. Led by sixth-year head coach Bert Piggott, the Aggies compiled an overall record of 7–3, with a mark of 6–1 in conference play, and finished tied for second in the CIAA.

Schedule

Date	Opponent	Site	Result	Attendance	Source
September 15	at Quantico Marines*	Butler Stadium; Quantico, VA	L 12–28		
September 22	Tennessee A&I*	World War Memorial Stadium; Greensboro, NC	W 16–13	7,500	
September 29	at Shaw	Chavis Park; Raleigh, NC	W 61–7	2,000	
October 6	Norfolk State	World War Memorial Stadium; Greensboro, NC	W 13–6	4,500	
October 13	at Maryland State	Princess Anne, MD	W 20–8	5,000	
October 20	at Winston-Salem State	Bowman Gray Stadium; Winston-Salem, NC (rivalry)	W 32–6	4,000–5,500	
October 27	Morgan State	World War Memorial Stadium; Greensboro, NC	L 14–21	14,000	
November 3	at No. 1 Florida A&M*	Bragg Memorial Stadium; Tallahassee, FL	L 6–38	11,000	
November 10	Virginia State	World War Memorial Stadium; Greensboro, NC	W 32–8	4,500	
November 22	at North Carolina College	Durham County Memorial Stadium; Durham, NC (rivalry)	W 28–7	10,000	
*Non-conference game; Rankings from AP Poll released prior to the game; Source:

== 1963 ==
1963 North Carolina A&T Aggies football
- Conference: Central Intercollegiate Athletic Association
- Record: 7–3 (5–2 CIAA)
- Head coach: Bert Piggott (7th season)
- Home stadium: World War Memorial Stadium

1963 Central Intercollegiate Athletic Association football standings
	Conf.					Overall
Team	W		L		T	W		L		T
No. 17 North Carolina College $	6	–	1	–	0	8	–	1	–	0
No. 14 Morgan State	8	–	1	–	0	8	–	1	–	0
North Carolina A&T	5	–	2	–	0	7	–	3	–	0
Johnson C. Smith	5	–	1	–	0	7	–	2	–	0
Virginia Union	7	–	2	–	0	7	–	2	–	0
St. Augustine's	4	–	2	–	1	4	–	3	–	1
Virginia State	4	–	4	–	0	4	–	4	–	1
Saint Paul's (VA)	4	–	3	–	0	4	–	3	–	1
Winston-Salem State	3	–	3	–	1	4	–	3	–	1
Norfolk State	4	–	3	–	0	4	–	4	–	0
Maryland State	3	–	4	–	0	4	–	4	–	0
Elizabeth City State	3	–	5	–	0	3	–	5	–	0
Hampton	2	–	5	–	0	4	–	5	–	0
Shaw	2	–	6	–	0	2	–	8	–	0
Howard	1	–	4	–	0	4	–	5	–	0
Fayetteville State	1	–	5	–	0	1	–	7	–	0
Delaware State	1	–	5	–	0	2	–	5	–	1
Livingstone	0	–	7	–	0	0	–	7	–	0
$ – Conference champion; Rankings from NAIA poll

The 1963 North Carolina A&T Aggies football team represented the Agricultural and Technical College of North Carolina (now known as North Carolina A&T State University) as a member of the Central Intercollegiate Athletic Association (CIAA) during the 1963 NCAA College Division football season. Led by seventh-year head coach Bert Piggott, the Aggies compiled an overall record of 7–3, with a mark of 5–2 in conference play, and finished third in the CIAA.

Schedule

Date	Opponent	Site	Result	Attendance	Source
September 21	at Fort Eustis*	Murphy Field; Newport News, VA	W 40–6		
September 28	at Tennessee A&I*	Hale Stadium; Nashville, TN	W 20–18	2,000	
October 5	Shaw	World War Memorial Stadium; Greensboro, NC	W 69–0	5,000	
October 12	vs. Norfolk State	Lawrence Stadium; Portsmouth, VA	W 34–7	8,000	
October 19	Maryland State^{†}	World War Memorial Stadium; Greensboro, NC	W 25–14	14,000	
October 26	Winston-Salem State	World War Memorial Stadium; Greensboro, NC (rivalry)	W 60–18		
November 2	at Morgan State	Hughes Stadium; Baltimore, MD	L 0–23	8,000	
November 9	No. 3 Florida A&M*	World War Memorial Stadium; Greensboro, NC	L 0–32	15,000	
November 16	at Virginia State	Rogers Stadium; Ettrick, VA	W 25–6		
November 28	North Carolina College	World War Memorial Stadium; Greensboro, NC (rivalry)	L 0–6	10,000	
*Non-conference game; ^{†}Homecoming; Rankings from AP Poll released prior to the game; Source:

== 1964 ==
1964 North Carolina A&T Aggies football

CIAA champion
- Conference: Central Intercollegiate Athletic Association
- Record: 6–3–1 (6–0–1 CIAA)
- Head coach: Bert Piggott (8th season)
- Home stadium: World War Memorial Stadium

1964 Central Intercollegiate Athletic Association football standings
	Conf.					Overall
Team	W		L		T	W		L		T
North Carolina A&T $	6	–	0	–	1	6	–	3	–	1
Morgan State	7	–	2	–	0	7	–	2	–	0
Howard	4	–	1	–	0	8	–	2	–	0
Johnson C. Smith	6	–	1	–	0	7	–	2	–	1
Maryland State	4	–	1	–	1	4	–	2	–	1
Virginia State	6	–	2	–	0	6	–	2	–	0
Virginia Union	6	–	3	–	0	6	–	3	–	0
Winston-Salem State	4	–	3	–	0	4	–	4	–	0
Elizabeth City State	4	–	4	–	0	4	–	4	–	0
Saint Paul's (VA)	3	–	4	–	0	3	–	6	–	0
St. Augustine's	4	–	5	–	0	5	–	5	–	0
Delaware State	3	–	5	–	0	3	–	7	–	0
North Carolina College	2	–	5	–	0	4	–	5	–	0
Shaw	2	–	6	–	1	2	–	7	–	1
Norfolk State	2	–	5	–	0	2	–	5	–	0
Fayetteville State	1	–	5	–	1	2	–	7	–	1
Livingstone	1	–	5	–	1	2	–	7	–	1
Hampton	0	–	7	–	0	1	–	8	–	0
$ – Conference champion

The 1964 North Carolina A&T Aggies football team represented the Agricultural and Technical College of North Carolina (now known as North Carolina A&T State University) as a member of the Central Intercollegiate Athletic Association (CIAA) during the 1964 NCAA College Division football season. Led by eighth-year head coach Bert Piggott, the Aggies compiled an overall record of 6–3–1, with a mark of 6–0–1 in conference play, and finished as CIAA champion.

Schedule

Date	Opponent	Site	Result	Attendance	Source
September 19	Fort Eustis*	World War Memorial Stadium; Greensboro, NC	L 13–28	3,500	
September 26	Tennessee A&I*	World War Memorial Stadium; Greensboro, NC	L 6–60	6,000	
October 3	at Johnson C. Smith	American Legion Memorial Stadium; Charlotte, NC	W 46–27	4,500	
October 10	Norfolk State	World War Memorial Stadium; Greensboro, NC	W 36–13	4,000	
October 17	at Maryland State	Princess Anne, MD	T 8–8	500	
October 24	at Winston-Salem State	Bowman Gray Stadium; Winston-Salem, NC (rivalry)	W 50–12	4,000	
October 31	Morgan State^{†}	World War Memorial Stadium; Greensboro, NC	W 29–8	15,000	
November 7	at No. 3 Florida A&M*	Bragg Memorial Stadium; Tallahassee, FL	L 24–46	11,000	
November 14	Virginia State	World War Memorial Stadium; Greensboro, NC	W 34–6	3,000	
November 26	at North Carolina College	Durham County Memorial Stadium; Durham, NC (rivalry)	W 26–0	9,000–11,000	
*Non-conference game; ^{†}Homecoming; Rankings from AP Poll released prior to the game; Source:

== 1965 ==
1965 North Carolina A&T Aggies football
- Conference: Central Intercollegiate Athletic Association
- Record: 4–6 (4–3 CIAA)
- Head coach: Bert Piggott (9th season)
- Home stadium: World War Memorial Stadium

1965 Central Intercollegiate Athletic Association football standings
	Conf.					Overall
Team	W		L		T	W		L		T
No. 3 Morgan State $	8	–	0	–	0	9	–	0	–	0
Johnson C. Smith	5	–	1	–	0	5	–	4	–	0
Maryland State	5	–	1	–	0	5	–	2	–	0
St. Augustine's	6	–	1	–	1	8	–	1	–	1
North Carolina A&T	4	–	3	–	0	4	–	6	–	0
Delaware State	3	–	3	–	0	4	–	5	–	0
Virginia State	5	–	4	–	0	5	–	4	–	0
Saint Paul's (VA)	4	–	3	–	0	5	–	3	–	0
North Carolina College	3	–	4	–	1	3	–	5	–	1
Howard	2	–	3	–	0	5	–	3	–	0
Norfolk State	4	–	4	–	0	4	–	4	–	0
Virginia Union	3	–	5	–	0	3	–	5	–	0
Livingstone	3	–	5	–	0	3	–	5	–	0
Shaw	4	–	5	–	0	4	–	5	–	0
Elizabeth City State	3	–	5	–	0	3	–	5	–	0
Winston-Salem State	2	–	6	–	0	2	–	7	–	0
Fayetteville State	1	–	5	–	0	1	–	6	–	0
Hampton	0	–	7	–	0	1	–	8	–	0
$ – Conference champion; Rankings from NAIA poll

The 1965 North Carolina A&T Aggies football team represented the Agricultural and Technical College of North Carolina (now known as North Carolina A&T State University) as a member of the Central Intercollegiate Athletic Association (CIAA) during the 1965 NCAA College Division football season. Led by ninth-year head coach Bert Piggott, the Aggies compiled an overall record of 4–6, with a mark of 4–3 in conference play, and finished fifth in the CIAA.

Schedule

Date	Opponent	Site	Result	Attendance	Source
September 18	at Camp Lejeune*	Jacksonville, NC	L 14–17		
September 25	at Tennessee A&I*	Hale Stadium; Nashville, TN	L 12–42		
October 2	Johnson C. Smith	World War Memorial Stadium; Greensboro, NC	W 18–12	10,000	
October 9	at Norfolk State	Foreman Field; Norfolk, VA	W 27–20	6,500	
October 17	Maryland State^{†}	World War Memorial Stadium; Greensboro, NC	L 14–26	15,000	
October 23	Winston-Salem State	World War Memorial Stadium; Greensboro, NC (rivalry)	W 30–20		
October 30	at Morgan State	Hughes Stadium; Baltimore, MD	L 6–31		
November 6	Florida A&M*	World War Memorial Stadium; Greensboro, NC	L 14–28	7,500	
November 13	at Virginia State	Rogers Stadium; Ettrick, VA	W 11–0	3,800	
November 25	North Carolina College	World War Memorial Stadium; Greensboro, NC (rivalry)	L 6–7	7,000	
*Non-conference game; ^{†}Homecoming; Source:

== 1966 ==
1966 North Carolina A&T Aggies football
- Conference: Central Intercollegiate Athletic Association
- Record: 3–6 (3–4 CIAA)
- Head coach: Bert Piggott (10th season)
- Home stadium: World War Memorial Stadium

1966 Central Intercollegiate Athletic Association football standings
	Conf.					Overall
Team	W		L		T	W		L		T
Morgan State $	8	–	0	–	0	9	–	0	–	0
North Carolina College	6	–	3	–	0	6	–	3	–	0
Livingstone	5	–	1	–	1	6	–	3	–	1
Johnson C. Smith	3	–	2	–	1	3	–	5	–	1
Hampton	5	–	2	–	0	6	–	3	–	0
Elizabeth City State	5	–	3	–	0	5	–	3	–	0
Maryland State	3	–	3	–	0	5	–	3	–	0
Virginia Union	4	–	4	–	0	4	–	4	–	0
Norfolk State	3	–	5	–	0	3	–	5	–	0
North Carolina A&T	3	–	4	–	0	3	–	6	–	0
Fayetteville State	2	–	3	–	1	3	–	4	–	1
Howard	2	–	3	–	0	4	–	4	–	0
Virginia State	3	–	5	–	0	3	–	5	–	0
Delaware State	2	–	4	–	0	3	–	5	–	0
Winston-Salem State	2	–	5	–	0	2	–	6	–	0
Saint Paul's (VA)	1	–	6	–	1	1	–	7	–	1
Shaw	0	–	7	–	2	0	–	7	–	2
$ – Conference champion

The 1966 North Carolina A&T Aggies football team represented the Agricultural and Technical College of North Carolina (now known as North Carolina A&T State University) as a member of the Central Intercollegiate Athletic Association (CIAA) during the 1966 NCAA College Division football season. Led by 10th-year head coach Bert Piggott, the Aggies compiled an overall record of 3–6, with a mark of 3–4 in conference play, and finished 10th in the CIAA.

Schedule

Date	Opponent	Site	Result	Attendance	Source
September 24	Tennessee A&I*	World War Memorial Stadium; Greensboro, NC	L 0–55		
October 1	at Johnson C. Smith	American Legion Memorial Stadium; Charlotte, NC	W 34–13		
October 8	Norfolk State	World War Memorial Stadium; Greensboro, NC	W 40–6	7,000	
October 15	at Maryland State	Wicomico County Stadium; Salisbury, MD	L 7–28	4,000	
October 22	at Winston-Salem State	Bowman Gray Stadium; Winston-Salem, NC (rivalry)	W 56–0		
October 29	Morgan State	World War Memorial Stadium; Greensboro, NC	L 8–13		
November 5	at Florida A&M*	Bragg Memorial Stadium; Tallahassee, FL	L 18–64	13,500	
November 11	vs. Virginia State	DC Stadium; Washington, DC (Veterans' Day Classic)	L 12–13	6,000	
November 24	at North Carolina College	Durham County Memorial Stadium; Durham, NC (rivalry)	L 6–12		
*Non-conference game; Source:

== 1967 ==
1967 North Carolina A&T Aggies football
- Conference: Central Intercollegiate Athletic Association
- Record: 3–5–1 (3–3–1 CIAA)
- Head coach: Bert Piggott (11th season)
- Home stadium: World War Memorial Stadium

1967 Central Intercollegiate Athletic Association football standings
	Conf.					Overall
Team	W		L		T	W		L		T
No. 9 Morgan State $	8	–	0	–	0	8	–	0	–	0
Maryland State	5	–	1	–	0	5	–	2	–	0
Johnson C. Smith	5	–	0	–	1	6	–	2	–	1
Virginia Union	5	–	3	–	0	5	–	3	–	0
North Carolina A&T	3	–	3	–	1	3	–	5	–	1
Elizabeth City State	6	–	2	–	0	7	–	2	–	0
Virginia State	4	–	3	–	1	4	–	3	–	1
Norfolk State	3	–	4	–	0	4	–	4	–	0
Delaware State	2	–	3	–	1	2	–	6	–	1
Hampton	3	–	4	–	0	3	–	5	–	0
Winston-Salem State	3	–	4	–	0	3	–	5	–	0
Howard	2	–	3	–	0	2	–	6	–	0
Livingstone	2	–	4	–	0	2	–	6	–	0
North Carolina College	1	–	5	–	1	1	–	7	–	1
Fayetteville State	1	–	4	–	1	2	–	5	–	1
Saint Paul's (VA)	1	–	5	–	1	2	–	5	–	1
Shaw	1	–	7	–	1	1	–	7	–	1
$ – Conference champion; Rankings from AP small college poll

The 1967 North Carolina A&T Aggies football team represented North Carolina A&T State University as a member of the Central Intercollegiate Athletic Association (CIAA) during the 1967 NCAA College Division football season. Led by 11th-year head coach Bert Piggott, the Aggies compiled an overall record of 3–5–1, with a mark of 3–3–1 in conference play, and finished fifth in the CIAA.

Schedule

Date	Opponent	Site	Result	Attendance	Source
September 23	at Tennessee A&I*	Hale Stadium; Nashville, TN	L 0–35		
September 30	Johnson C. Smith	World War Memorial Stadium; Greensboro, NC	T 6–6	10,000	
October 7	vs. Norfolk State	Lawrence Stadium; Portsmouth, VA	L 14–17	5,561	
October 14	Maryland State	World War Memorial Stadium; Greensboro, NC	L 14–25	10,000	
October 21	Winston-Salem State	World War Memorial Stadium; Greensboro, NC (rivalry)	W 54–8		
October 28	at Morgan State	Memorial Stadium; Baltimore, MD	L 20–27	18,000	
November 4	Florida A&M*	World War Memorial Stadium; Greensboro, NC	L 6–63	7,000	
November 11	at Virginia State	Rogers Stadium; Ettrick, VA	W 22–6		
November 23	North Carolina College	World War Memorial Stadium; Greensboro, NC (rivalry)	W 19–6		
*Non-conference game; Source:

== 1969 ==
1969 North Carolina A&T Aggies football
- Conference: Central Intercollegiate Athletic Association
- Record: 6–2–1 (5–1–1 CIAA)
- Head coach: Hornsby Howell (2nd season)
- Home stadium: World War Memorial Stadium

1969 Central Intercollegiate Athletic Association football standings
	Conf.					Overall
Team	W		L		T	W		L		T
Johnson C. Smith $	6	–	1	–	0	8	–	2	–	0
North Carolina Central	7	–	1	–	1	7	–	2	–	1
Elizabeth City State	8	–	1	–	0	8	–	1	–	0
North Carolina A&T	5	–	1	–	1	6	–	2	–	1
Morgan State	6	–	2	–	0	6	–	4	–	0
Norfolk State	4	–	3	–	0	4	–	4	–	0
Virginia Union	5	–	4	–	0	5	–	4	–	0
Livingstone	4	–	3	–	0	5	–	3	–	0
Delaware State	3	–	3	–	0	4	–	5	–	0
Fayetteville State	3	–	3	–	1	3	–	4	–	1
Virginia State	3	–	5	–	1	3	–	5	–	1
Howard	2	–	3	–	0	3	–	6	–	0
Shaw	2	–	5	–	0	2	–	6	–	0
Maryland State	1	–	5	–	0	1	–	7	–	0
Winston-Salem State	1	–	7	–	0	2	–	7	–	0
Saint Paul's (VA)	0	–	6	–	0	1	–	7	–	0
Hampton	0	–	7	–	0	0	–	9	–	0
$ – Conference champion; Conference standings were determined by Dickinson Rating

The 1969 North Carolina A&T Aggies football team represented North Carolina A&T State University as a member of the Central Intercollegiate Athletic Association (CIAA) during the 1969 NCAA College Division football season. Led by second-year head coach Hornsby Howell, the Aggies compiled an overall record of 6–2–1, with a mark of 5–1–1 in conference play, and finished fourth in the CIAA.

Schedule

Date	Opponent	Site	Result	Attendance	Source
September 27	at South Carolina State*	State College Stadium; Orangeburg, SC (rivalry)	W 20–6	8,572	
October 4	Johnson C. Smith	World War Memorial Stadium; Greensboro, NC	L 14–15	14,736	
October 11	vs. Norfolk State	Lawrence Stadium; Portsmouth, VA	W 20–14	5,124	
October 18	Maryland State	World War Memorial Stadium; Greensboro, NC	W 14–6	17,861	
October 25	Winston-Salem State	World War Memorial Stadium; Greensboro, NC (rivalry)	W 37–7	16,462	
November 1	at Morgan State	Hughes Stadium; Baltimore, MD	W 20–19	13,416	
November 8	Florida A&M*	World War Memorial Stadium; Greensboro, NC	L 9–26	17,147	
November 15	at Virginia State	Rogers Stadium; Ettrick, VA	W 21–8	2,417	
November 22	North Carolina Central	World War Memorial Stadium; Greensboro, NC (rivalry)	T 28–28	18,453	
*Non-conference game; Source:
