= 1963 NAIA football season =

American college football season

- Regular season: August–December 1963
- Postseason: December 7–14, 1963
- National Championship: Hughes Stadium; Sacramento, CA
- Champion: Saint John's (MN)

The 1963 NAIA football season was the eighth season of college football sponsored by the NAIA. The season was played from August to December 1963, culminating in the eighth annual NAIA Football National Championship, played this year at Hughes Stadium in Sacramento, California. During its three years in Sacramento, the game was called the Camellia Bowl (separate from the later Camellia Bowl contested in Montgomery, Alabama).

Saint John's (MN) defeated Prairie View A&M in the championship game, 33–27, to win its first NAIA national title.

== Conference standings ==
1963 Arkansas Intercollegiate Conference football standings
	Conf.					Overall
Team	W		L		T	W		L		T
Arkansas A&M +	6	–	1	–	0	9	–	1	–	0
Henderson State +	6	–	1	–	0	8	–	1	–	1
Arkansas State Teachers	5	–	1	–	1	6	–	2	–	1
Ouachita Baptist	4	–	3	–	0	6	–	4	–	0
Arkansas Tech	3	–	3	–	1	3	–	5	–	2
Southern Arkansas	2	–	5	–	0	2	–	7	–	0
Ozarks	1	–	6	–	0	1	–	6	–	2
Harding	0	–	7	–	0	1	–	8	–	0
+ – Conference co-champions

1963 Carolinas Conference football standings
	Conf.					Overall
Team	W		L		T	W		L		T
Catawba +	5	–	1	–	0	6	–	3	–	0
Elon +	5	–	1	–	0	6	–	4	–	0
Appalachian State	4	–	1	–	0	6	–	3	–	0
Newberry	3	–	3	–	0	5	–	5	–	0
Lenoir Rhyne	2	–	4	–	0	4	–	6	–	0
Western Carolina	1	–	5	–	0	2	–	6	–	1
Guilford	0	–	5	–	0	0	–	10	–	0
$ – Conference champion

1963 Central Intercollegiate Athletic Association football standings
	Conf.					Overall
Team	W		L		T	W		L		T
No. 17 North Carolina College $	6	–	1	–	0	8	–	1	–	0
No. 14 Morgan State	8	–	1	–	0	8	–	1	–	0
North Carolina A&T	5	–	2	–	0	7	–	3	–	0
Johnson C. Smith	5	–	1	–	0	7	–	2	–	0
Virginia Union	7	–	2	–	0	7	–	2	–	0
St. Augustine's	4	–	2	–	1	4	–	3	–	1
Virginia State	4	–	4	–	0	4	–	4	–	1
Saint Paul's (VA)	4	–	3	–	0	4	–	3	–	1
Winston-Salem State	3	–	3	–	1	4	–	3	–	1
Norfolk State	4	–	3	–	0	4	–	4	–	0
Maryland State	3	–	4	–	0	4	–	4	–	0
Elizabeth City State	3	–	5	–	0	3	–	5	–	0
Hampton	2	–	5	–	0	4	–	5	–	0
Shaw	2	–	6	–	0	2	–	8	–	0
Howard	1	–	4	–	0	4	–	5	–	0
Fayetteville State	1	–	5	–	0	1	–	7	–	0
Delaware State	1	–	5	–	0	2	–	5	–	1
Livingstone	0	–	7	–	0	0	–	7	–	0
$ – Conference champion; Rankings from NAIA poll

1963 Central Intercollegiate Conference football standings
	Conf.					Overall
Team	W		L		T	W		L		T
Omaha $	4	–	0	–	0	7	–	2	–	0
Pittsburg State	2	–	1	–	1	5	–	3	–	1
Washburn *	2	–	2	–	0	3	–	6	–	0
Fort Hays State	1	–	3	–	0	2	–	6	–	1
Emporia State	0	–	3	–	1	2	–	5	–	2
$ – Conference champion; * — Washburn forfeited two non-conference wins

1963 College Conference of Illinois football standings
	Conf.					Overall
Team	W		L		T	W		L		T
Carthage $	4	–	1	–	1	6	–	1	–	1
Augustana (IL)	4	–	2	–	0	7	–	2	–	0
Illinois Wesleyan	4	–	2	–	0	6	–	3	–	0
Millikin	3	–	2	–	1	4	–	3	–	1
Carroll (WI)	3	–	3	–	0	5	–	4	–	0
North Central (IL)	2	–	4	–	0	2	–	6	–	0
North Park	0	–	6	–	0	1	–	7	–	0
$ – Conference champion

1963 Evergreen Conference football standings
	Conf.					Overall
Team	W		L		T	W		L		T
No. 10 Central Washington $	7	–	0	–	0	9	–	0	–	0
Whitworth	5	–	2	–	0	6	–	2	–	1
Western Washington	4	–	3	–	0	5	–	4	–	0
Puget Sound	2	–	5	–	0	4	–	5	–	0
Eastern Washington	2	–	5	–	0	3	–	6	–	0
Pacific Lutheran	1	–	6	–	0	1	–	7	–	0
$ – Conference champion; Rankings from NAIA poll

1963 Gateway Conference football standings
	Conf.					Overall
Team	W		L		T	W		L		T
Northwestern (WI) $	3	–	1	–	0	?	–	?	–	?
Milton	2	–	1	–	1	6	–	2	–	0
Lakeland	2	–	1	–	1	3	–	6	–	0
Illinois–Chicago	2	–	2	–	0	?	–	?	–	?
Eureka	0	–	4	–	0	0	–	7	–	0
$ – Conference champion; Lakeland and Milton split two head-to-head games, which counted as a tie for both teams in the conference standings.

1963 Great Plains College Association football standings
	Conf.					Overall
Team	W		L		T	W		L		T
Nebraska Wesleyan $	3	–	0	–	0	7	–	2	–	0
Hastings	2	–	1	–	0	5	–	3	–	1
Colorado College	1	–	2	–	0	4	–	6	–	0
Doane	0	–	3	–	0	3	–	6	–	0
$ – Conference champion

1963 Interstate Intercollegiate Athletic Conference football standings
	Conf.					Overall
Team	W		L		T	W		L		T
No. 1 Northern Illinois $	4	–	0	–	0	10	–	0	–	0
Western Illinois	3	–	1	–	0	6	–	3	–	0
Central Michigan	2	–	2	–	0	4	–	5	–	1
Eastern Illinois	1	–	3	–	0	2	–	7	–	0
Illinois State Normal	0	–	4	–	0	3	–	6	–	0
$ – Conference champion; Rankings from NAIA poll

1963 Iowa Conference football standings
	Conf.					Overall
Team	W		L		T	W		L		T
Luther $	8	–	0	–	0	9	–	0	–	0
Central (IA)	6	–	1	–	1	7	–	1	–	1
Upper Iowa	5	–	3	–	0	6	–	3	–	0
Simpson (IA)	5	–	3	–	0	5	–	4	–	0
Dubuque	3	–	4	–	1	3	–	4	–	1
Buena Vista	3	–	5	–	0	4	–	5	–	0
Wartburg	3	–	5	–	0	3	–	5	–	0
Iowa Wesleyan	2	–	6	–	0	2	–	7	–	0
William Penn	0	–	8	–	0	0	–	9	–	0
$ – Conference champion

1963 Kansas Collegiate Athletic Conference football standings
	Conf.					Overall
Team	W		L		T	W		L		T
No. 6 College of Emporia $^	9	–	0	–	0	10	–	1	–	0
Ottawa	8	–	1	–	0	9	–	1	–	0
Bethany (KS)	6	–	3	–	0	6	–	3	–	0
Southwestern (KS)	5	–	4	–	0	6	–	4	–	0
Baker	5	–	4	–	0	5	–	4	–	0
Bethel (KS)	4	–	5	–	0	4	–	5	–	0
McPherson	3	–	6	–	0	3	–	6	–	0
Kansas Wesleyan	3	–	6	–	0	3	–	6	–	0
Sterling	2	–	7	–	0	2	–	7	–	0
Friends	0	–	9	–	0	0	–	9	–	0
$ – Conference champion; ^ – NAIA playoff participant; Rankings from NAIA poll

1963 Lone Star Conference football standings
	Conf.					Overall
Team	W		L		T	W		L		T
No. 7 Southwest Texas State $	6	–	0	–	0	10	–	0	–	0
East Texas State	4	–	2	–	0	7	–	2	–	1
Stephen F. Austin	4	–	2	–	0	7	–	3	–	0
Texas A&I	3	–	3	–	0	5	–	4	–	0
Sam Houston State	2	–	3	–	1	4	–	3	–	1
Howard Payne	1	–	5	–	0	3	–	7	–	0
Sul Ross	0	–	5	–	1	1	–	7	–	1
$ – Conference champion; Rankings from NAIA poll

1963 Mid-Ohio Conference football standings
	Conf.					Overall
Team	W		L		T	W		L		T
Ashland $	3	–	0	–	0	9	–	1	–	0
Bluffton	2	–	1	–	0	7	–	2	–	0
Defiance	1	–	3	–	0	2	–	6	–	0
Wilmington (OH)	1	–	3	–	0	3	–	5	–	0
$ – Conference champion

1963 Midwest Conference football standings
	Conf.					Overall
Team	W		L		T	W		L		T
Ripon $	8	–	0	–	0	8	–	0	–	0
Carleton	5	–	2	–	1	5	–	2	–	1
Cornell (IA)	5	–	3	–	0	5	–	3	–	0
Grinnell	5	–	3	–	0	5	–	3	–	0
Beloit	3	–	3	–	2	3	–	3	–	2
Coe	4	–	4	–	0	4	–	4	–	0
St. Olaf	4	–	4	–	0	4	–	4	–	0
Lawrence	3	–	4	–	1	3	–	4	–	1
Knox	1	–	7	–	0	1	–	7	–	0
Monmouth (IL)	0	–	8	–	0	0	–	8	–	0
$ – Conference champion

1963 Minnesota Intercollegiate Athletic Conference football standings
	Conf.					Overall
Team	W		L		T	W		L		T
No. 2 Saint John's (MN) $^	7	–	0	–	0	10	–	0	–	0
Concordia (MN)	6	–	1	–	0	7	–	2	–	0
Augsburg	4	–	3	–	0	4	–	3	–	1
Hamline	3	–	4	–	0	4	–	4	–	1
Gustavus Adolphus	3	–	4	–	0	4	–	5	–	0
St. Thomas (MN)	3	–	4	–	0	4	–	5	–	0
Minnesota–Duluth	2	–	5	–	0	3	–	6	–	0
Macalester	0	–	7	–	0	1	–	8	–	0
$ – Conference champion; ^ – NAIA playoff participant; Rankings from NAIA poll

1963 Missouri College Athletic Union football standings
	Conf.					Overall
Team	W		L		T	W		L		T
William Jewell $	4	–	0	–	0	6	–	2	–	1
Missouri Valley	3	–	1	–	0	5	–	4	–	0
Tarkio	3	–	2	–	0	5	–	3	–	0
Graceland	1	–	3	–	0	1	–	7	–	0
Culver–Stockton	1	–	4	–	0	2	–	6	–	0
Central Methodist	0	–	2	–	0	0	–	8	–	0
$ – Conference champion

1963 Montana Collegiate Conference football standings
	Conf.					Overall
Team	W		L		T	W		L		T
Upper Division
No. 18 Western Montana x$	5	–	0	–	0	?	–	?	–	?
Eastern Montana	3	–	2	–	0	4	–	3	–	0
Carroll (MT)	1	–	4	–	0	3	–	4	–	0
Lower Division
Rocky Mountain x	4	–	1	–	0	?	–	?	–	?
Montana Mines	1	–	4	–	0	?	–	?	–	?
Northern Montana	1	–	4	–	0	1	–	6	–	0
$ – Conference champion; x – Division champion/co-champions; Rankings from NAIA poll

1963 Nebraska College Conference football standings
	Conf.					Overall
Team	W		L		T	W		L		T
No. 3 Kearney State $^	5	–	0	–	0	9	–	1	–	0
Hastings	3	–	1	–	1	5	–	3	–	1
Wayne State (NE)	3	–	2	–	0	4	–	5	–	0
Doane	2	–	3	–	0	3	–	6	–	0
Peru State	1	–	3	–	1	3	–	5	–	1
Chadron State	0	–	5	–	0	1	–	7	–	0
$ – Conference champion; ^ – NAIA playoff participant; Rankings from NAIA poll

1963 North Dakota College Athletic Conference football standings
	Conf.					Overall
Team	W		L		T	W		L		T
Valley City State $	5	–	0	–	1	6	–	1	–	1
Mayville State	4	–	1	–	1	5	–	2	–	1
Minot State	3	–	2	–	1	4	–	3	–	1
Dickinson State	3	–	2	–	1	3	–	3	–	2
Wahpeton Science	3	–	3	–	0	3	–	5	–	0
Jamestown	1	–	5	–	0	1	–	7	–	0
Ellendale	0	–	6	–	0	0	–	7	–	0
$ – Conference champion

1963 Northern Intercollegiate Conference football standings
	Conf.					Overall
Team	W		L		T	W		L		T
Michigan Tech $	4	–	1	–	0	6	–	2	–	0
Bemidji State	3	–	1	–	1	6	–	1	–	1
St. Cloud State	3	–	2	–	0	6	–	3	–	0
Mankato State	3	–	2	–	0	4	–	4	–	1
Moorhead State	1	–	3	–	1	4	–	4	–	1
Winona State	0	–	5	–	0	1	–	7	–	0
$ – Conference champion

1963 Northwest Conference football standings
	Conf.					Overall
Team	W		L		T	W		L		T
No. 8 Lewis & Clark $	5	–	0	–	0	8	–	0	–	0
No. 16 Linfield	4	–	1	–	0	8	–	1	–	0
Willamette	3	–	2	–	0	3	–	5	–	0
Pacific (OR)	2	–	3	–	0	3	–	6	–	0
College of Idaho	1	–	4	–	0	3	–	6	–	0
Whitman	0	–	5	–	0	1	–	7	–	0
$ – Conference champion

1963 Oklahoma Collegiate Conference football standings
	Conf.					Overall
Team	W		L		T	W		L		T
No. 4 Northeastern State $	7	–	0	–	0	11	–	0	–	0
East Central	5	–	1	–	1	8	–	1	–	1
Panhandle A&M	4	–	2	–	1	7	–	2	–	1
Central State (OK)	3	–	3	–	1	4	–	4	–	1
NW Oklahoma State	2	–	3	–	2	4	–	4	–	2
Langston	2	–	5	–	0	3	–	7	–	0
SE Oklahoma State	1	–	5	–	1	1	–	7	–	2
SW Oklahoma State	1	–	6	–	0	3	–	7	–	0
$ – Conference champion; Rankings from NAIA poll

1963 Oregon Collegiate Conference football standings
	Conf.					Overall
Team	W		L		T	W		L		T
Portland State $	4	–	0	–	0	6	–	2	–	0
Southern Oregon	3	–	1	–	0	5	–	4	–	0
Oregon Tech	2	–	2	–	0	2	–	4	–	0
Oregon College	1	–	3	–	0	3	–	6	–	0
Eastern Oregon	0	–	4	–	0	1	–	8	–	0
$ – Conference champion

1963 Pennsylvania State College Conference football standings
	Conf.					Overall
Team	W		L		T	W		L		T
East Division
West Chester xy$	6	–	0	–	0	8	–	1	–	0
East Stroudsburg	4	–	2	–	0	5	–	3	–	0
Millersville	4	–	2	–	0	5	–	3	–	0
Mansfield	3	–	3	–	0	4	–	4	–	0
Bloomsburg	2	–	4	–	0	3	–	5	–	0
Kutztown	2	–	4	–	0	3	–	5	–	0
Cheyney	0	–	6	–	0	1	–	6	–	0
West Division
Slippery Rock xy	6	–	0	–	0	6	–	3	–	1
No. 19 Indiana (PA)	5	–	1	–	0	7	–	1	–	1
California (PA)	4	–	2	–	0	5	–	2	–	0
Shippensburg	3	–	3	–	0	3	–	5	–	0
Clarion	2	–	4	–	0	4	–	4	–	0
Edinboro	1	–	5	–	0	2	–	6	–	0
Lock Haven	0	–	6	–	0	2	–	6	–	0
Championship: West Chester 36, Slippery Rock 7
$ – Conference champion; x – Division champion/co-champions; y – Championship game participant; Rankings from NAIA poll

1963 Rocky Mountain Conference football standings
	Conf.					Overall
Team	W		L		T	W		L		T
Western State (CO) $	4	–	0	–	0	8	–	1	–	0
Adams State	3	–	1	–	0	6	–	4	–	0
Colorado State–Greeley	2	–	2	–	0	4	–	5	–	0
Colorado Mines	1	–	3	–	0	6	–	3	–	0
Colorado College	0	–	4	–	0	4	–	6	–	0
$ – Conference champion

1963 South Dakota Intercollegiate Conference football standings
	Conf.					Overall
Team	W		L		T	W		L		T
No. 11 Northern State $	6	–	0	–	0	8	–	1	–	0
Huron	5	–	1	–	0	6	–	3	–	0
Black Hills	3	–	2	–	1	4	–	3	–	1
Southern State (SD)	2	–	3	–	1	4	–	4	–	1
General Beadle	2	–	4	–	0	3	–	5	–	0
Dakota Wesleyan	1	–	5	–	0	2	–	7	–	0
South Dakota Tech	1	–	5	–	0	2	–	5	–	1
$ – Conference champion; Rankings from NAIA poll

1963 Southern California Intercollegiate Athletic Conference football standings
	Conf.					Overall
Team	W		L		T	W		L		T
Whittier +	2	–	1	–	0	6	–	2	–	1
Occidental +	2	–	1	–	0	6	–	3	–	0
Pomona	1	–	2	–	0	5	–	3	–	1
Redlands	1	–	2	–	0	4	–	6	–	0
+ – Conference co-champions

1963 Southwestern Athletic Conference football standings
	Conf.					Overall
Team	W		L		T	W		L		T
No. 5 Prairie View A&M $^	7	–	0	–	0	10	–	1	–	0
Southern	5	–	2	–	0	7	–	3	–	0
Texas Southern	5	–	2	–	0	7	–	3	–	0
Grambling	3	–	3	–	1	5	–	3	–	1
Arkansas AM&N	3	–	3	–	1	5	–	4	–	1
Jackson State	2	–	5	–	0	4	–	5	–	0
Wiley	2	–	5	–	0	4	–	5	–	0
Alcorn A&M	0	–	7	–	0	3	–	7	–	0
$ – Conference champion; ^ – NAIA playoff participant; Rankings from NAIA poll

1963 Tri-State Conference football standings
	Conf.					Overall
Team	W		L		T	W		L		T
Midland $	5	–	0	–	1	6	–	1	–	1
Concordia (NE)	5	–	1	–	0	6	–	3	–	0
Westmar	4	–	1	–	1	6	–	1	–	2
Northwestern (IA)	3	–	3	–	0	4	–	4	–	0
Dana	2	–	4	–	0	2	–	6	–	0
Yankton	1	–	5	–	0	1	–	8	–	0
Sioux Falls	0	–	6	–	0	1	–	7	–	0
$ – Conference champion

1963 West Penn Conference football standings
	Conf.					Overall
Team	W		L		T	W		L		T
Waynesburg +	2	–	0	–	0	6	–	2	–	0
Westminster (PA) +	2	–	1	–	0	5	–	2	–	1
Geneva	1	–	2	–	0	1	–	7	–	0
Grove City	0	–	2	–	0	4	–	4	–	0
+ – Conference co-champions; Waynesburg and Westminster (PA) tied for the conference title based on two points per victory.

1963 West Virginia Intercollegiate Athletic Conference football standings
	Conf.					Overall
Team	W		L		T	W		L		T
Eastern Division
No. 20 West Liberty State x$	6	–	1	–	1	7	–	1	–	1
Shepherd	2	–	1	–	1	7	–	1	–	1
West Virginia State	3	–	3	–	0	4	–	4	–	0
Salem	1	–	4	–	1	1	–	5	–	1
Bluefield State	0	–	5	–	0	0	–	9	–	0
Western Division
Glenville State x	4	–	2	–	0	4	–	3	–	0
West Virginia Wesleyan	5	–	2	–	0	6	–	3	–	0
West Virginia Tech	4	–	2	–	0	5	–	3	–	0
Fairmont State	3	–	4	–	0	3	–	5	–	0
Concord	2	–	5	–	1	2	–	6	–	1
$ – Conference champion; x – Division champion/co-champions; Conference standings based on power ratings; Rankings from NAIA poll

1963 Wisconsin State College Conference football standings
	Conf.					Overall
Team	W		L		T	W		L		T
No. 13 Eau Claire State $	6	–	0	–	0	7	–	0	–	0
Stevens Point State	6	–	1	–	0	6	–	2	–	0
Whitewater State	5	–	2	–	0	6	–	3	–	0
Superior State	4	–	2	–	0	5	–	4	–	0
Platteville State	3	–	3	–	0	3	–	5	–	0
River Falls State	3	–	3	–	1	4	–	3	–	2
Stout State	2	–	4	–	1	2	–	5	–	1
Milwaukee	1	–	4	–	1	1	–	6	–	1
Oshkosh State	0	–	5	–	2	0	–	5	–	2
La Crosse State	0	–	6	–	1	0	–	8	–	1
$ – Conference champion; Rankings from NAIA poll

1963 NAIA independents football records
	Conf.			Overall
Team	W	L	T	W		L		T
Wheaton (IL)		–		8	–	1	–	0
Earlham		–		7	–	1	–	0
Oklahoma Panhandle State		–		7	–	2	–	1
Findlay		–		7	–	3	–	0
Hillsdale		–		6	–	3	–	1
Eastern New Mexico		–		6	–	4	–	0
Cal Lutheran		–		5	–	4	–	0
Austin		–		3	–	5	–	1
La Verne		–		3	–	5	–	0
Southern Colorado State		–		3	–	5	–	0
Carson–Newman		–		3	–	6	–	0
Georgetown (KY)		–		3	–	6	–	0
McMurry		–		3	–	7	–	0
St. Mary of the Plains		–		0	–	7	–	0
New Mexico Highlands		–		0	–	9	–	0

== Postseason ==
Semifinals; December 7, 1963
Prairie View A&M	20
Kearney State*	7
College of Emporia	0
Saint John's (MN)*	54

Championship; December 14, 1963; Camellia Bowl
Prairie View A&M	27
Saint John's (MN)	33

== See also ==
- 1963 NCAA University Division football season
- 1963 NCAA College Division football season
