= 1963 college football season =

1963 college football season may refer to:

- 1963 NCAA University Division football season
- 1963 NCAA College Division football season
- 1963 NAIA football season
