= 1963 Florida A&M Rattlers football team =

American college football season

1963 Florida A&M Rattlers football

SIAC champion

Orange Blossom Classic, W 30–7 vs. Morgan State
- Conference: Southern Intercollegiate Athletic Conference
- Record: 8–2 (3–0 SIAC)
- Head coach: Jake Gaither (19th season)
- Home stadium: Bragg Memorial Stadium

The 1963 Florida A&M Rattlers football team was an American football team that represented Florida A&M University as a member of the Southern Intercollegiate Athletic Conference (SIAC) during the 1963 NCAA College Division football season. In their 19th season under head coach Jake Gaither, the Rattlers compiled an 8–2 record, including a victory over Morgan State in the Orange Blossom Classic. The team played its home games at Bragg Memorial Stadium in Tallahassee, Florida.

The team's statistical leaders included Bobby Felts with 657 rushing yards and 68 points scored, Jim Tullis with 1,172 passing yards, and Al Denson with 564 receiving yards. Bobby Felts and Bob Hayes tied for the team lead with 11 touchdowns each.

== Schedule ==
Date	Opponent	Rank	Site	Result	Attendance	Source
September 28	Lincoln (MO)*		Bragg Memorial Stadium; Tallahassee, FL	W 44–6		
October 5	at Benedict		Columbia, SC	W 52–0	8,000	
October 19	Morris Brown^{†}	No. 2	Bragg Memorial Stadium; Tallahassee, FL	W 66–0		
October 26	at Tennessee A&I*	No. 2	Hale Stadium; Nashville, TN	L 12–14	11,000	
November 2	vs. Central State (OH)*	No. 3	Phillips Field; Tampa, FL (Golden Triangle Classic)	W 54–0	10,000	
November 9	at North Carolina A&T*	No. 3	World War Memorial Stadium; Greensboro, NC	W 32–0	15,000	
November 16	Southern*	No. 7	Bragg Memorial Stadium; Tallahassee, FL	W 37–0		
November 23	Bethune–Cookman	No. 6	Bragg Memorial Stadium; Tallahassee, FL (Florida Classic)	W 38–14		
November 30	vs. Texas Southern*	No. 7	Gator Bowl Stadium; Jacksonville, FL	L 14–20	21,000	
December 14	vs. Morgan State*	No. 7	Miami Orange Bowl; Miami, FL (Orange Blossom Classic)	W 30–7	31,769	
*Non-conference game; ^{†}Homecoming; Rankings from AP Poll released prior to the game
