= 1963 Mississippi Vocational Delta Devils football team =

American college football season

1963 Mississippi Vocational Delta Devils football

SCAC champion
- Conference: South Central Athletic Conference
- Record: 6–3 (2–0 SCAC)
- Head coach: Doug Porter (3rd season)
- Home stadium: Magnolia Stadium

The 1963 Mississippi Vocational Delta Devils football team represented Mississippi Vocational College (now known as Mississippi Valley State University) as a member of the South Central Athletic Conference (SCAC) during the 1963 NCAA College Division football season. Led by third-year head coach Doug Porter, the Delta Devils compiled an overall record of 6–3 and finished as SCAC champion.

== Schedule ==
| Date | Opponent | Site | Result | Source |
|---|---|---|---|---|
| September 21 | Bishop* | Magnolia Stadium; Itta Bena, MS | W 7–6 | |
| September 28 | Jackson State* | Magnolia Stadium; Itta Bena, MS | L 13–18 | |
| October 5 | at Alabama State* | Hornet Stadium; Montgomery, AL | W 42–0 | |
| October 12 | at Grambling* | Grambling Stadium; Grambling, LA | L 6–39 | |
| October 19 | Jarvis | Magnolia Stadium; Itta Bena, MS | W 50–8 | |
| October 26 | Mississippi Industrial^{†} | Magnolia Stadium; Itta Bena, MS | W 65–6 | |
| November 2 | at Rust* | Holly Springs, MS | W 40–0 | |
| November 9 | at Alcorn A&M* | Henderson Stadium; Lorman, MS | L 18–32 | |
| November 30 | vs. Arkansas AM&N* | Coleman High School Stadium; Greenville, MS | W 46–15 | |
*Non-conference game; ^{†}Homecoming
