= 1963 Prairie View A&M Panthers football team =

American college football season

1963 Prairie View A&M Panthers football

Black college national champion SWAC champion

Camellia Bowl, L 27–33 vs. Saint John's (MN)
- Conference: Southwestern Athletic Conference
- Record: 10–1 (7–0 SWAC)
- Head coach: Billy Nicks (15th season)
- Home stadium: Blackshear Stadium

1963 Southwestern Athletic Conference football standings
	Conf.					Overall
Team	W		L		T	W		L		T
No. 5 Prairie View A&M $^	7	–	0	–	0	10	–	1	–	0
Southern	5	–	2	–	0	7	–	3	–	0
Texas Southern	5	–	2	–	0	7	–	3	–	0
Grambling	3	–	3	–	1	5	–	3	–	1
Arkansas AM&N	3	–	3	–	1	5	–	4	–	1
Jackson State	2	–	5	–	0	4	–	5	–	0
Wiley	2	–	5	–	0	4	–	5	–	0
Alcorn A&M	0	–	7	–	0	3	–	7	–	0
$ – Conference champion; ^ – NAIA playoff participant; Rankings from NAIA poll

The 1963 Prairie View A&M Panthers football team was an American football team that represented Prairie View A&M University in the Southwestern Athletic Conference (SWAC) during the 1963 NCAA College Division football season. In their 15th season under head coach Billy Nicks, the Panthers compiled a 10–1 record (7–0 against SWAC opponents), won the SWAC championship, and outscored opponents by a total of 364 to 144.

The Panthers were recognized by the Pittsburgh Courier as the 1963 black college football national champion with a rating of 26.00, well ahead of second-place North Carolina College at 23.00 and third-place Morgan State at 21.97. At the end of the season, the team was invited to participate in the small college playoffs sponsored by the National Association of Intercollegiate Athletics (NAIA), marking the first time a black college was invited to participate in the playoffs. Prairie View defeated Nebraska State Teachers in the NAIA semifinal game before losing to John Gagliardi's Saint John's Johnnies in the NAIA Championship Game at the Camellia Bowl.

Key players for Prairie View included quarterback Jimmy Kearney and halfbacks Otis Taylor and Ezell Seals. Taylor later played 11 seasons for the Kansas City Chiefs.

== Schedule ==
Date	Opponent	Site	Result	Attendance	Source
September 13	at Lackland Air Force Base*	Lackland Air Force Base; San Antonio, TX	W 22–14		
September 21	Jackson State	Blackshear Stadium; Prairie View, TX	W 28–12		
October 5	at Texas Southern	Jeppesen Stadium; Houston, TX	W 44–6	14,000–26,000	
October 14	vs. Wiley	Cotton Bowl; Dallas, TX (State Fair Classic)	W 27–10		
October 19	at Grambling	Grambling Stadium; Grambling, LA	W 28–7	10,000	
October 26	at Arkansas AM&N	Pumphrey Stadium; Pine Bluff, AR	W 36–21	5,198	
November 9	Bishop*^{†}	Blackshear Stadium; Prairie View, TX	W 53–14	200	
November 16	at Alcorn A&M	Henderson Stadium; Lorman, MS	W 44–20		
November 23	at Southern	University Stadium; Baton Rouge, LA	W 35–0		
December 7	at Kearney State*	Foster Field; Kearney, NE (NAIA semifinal)	W 20–7		
December 14	vs. Saint John's (MN)*	Charles C. Hughes Stadium; Sacramento, CA (NAIA Championship Game—Camellia Bowl)	L 27–33	12,200	
*Non-conference game; ^{†}Homecoming
