= 1961 North Carolina College Eagles football team =

American college football season

1961 North Carolina College Eagles football

CIAA champion
- Conference: Central Intercollegiate Athletic Association
- Record: 7–0–2 (5–0–2 CIAA)
- Head coach: Herman Riddick (17th season)

1961 Central Intercollegiate Athletic Association football standings
| | Conf. | | | | | Overall |
| Team | W | | L | | T | W | | L | | T |
|---|---|---|---|---|---|---|---|---|---|---|
| North Carolina College $ | 5 | – | 0 | – | 2 | 7 | – | 0 | – | 2 |
| North Carolina A&T | 5 | – | 1 | – | 0 | 5 | – | 4 | – | 0 |
| Johnson C. Smith | 6 | – | 1 | – | 0 | 8 | – | 1 | – | 0 |
| Winston-Salem State | 5 | – | 1 | – | 1 | 6 | – | 1 | – | 1 |
| Maryland State | 2 | – | 2 | – | 1 | 4 | – | 2 | – | 1 |
| Delaware State | 5 | – | 2 | – | 0 | 7 | – | 3 | – | 0 |
| Virginia Union | 4 | – | 3 | – | 1 | 5 | – | 3 | – | 1 |
| Morgan State | 5 | – | 4 | – | 0 | 5 | – | 4 | – | 0 |
| Virginia State | 3 | – | 4 | – | 1 | 3 | – | 4 | – | 1 |
| Hampton | 3 | – | 3 | – | 0 | 6 | – | 3 | – | 0 |
| Elizabeth City State | 3 | – | 4 | – | 0 | 4 | – | 4 | – | 0 |
| St. Augustine's | 3 | – | 5 | – | 0 | 4 | – | 5 | – | 0 |
| Fayetteville State | 2 | – | 4 | – | 0 | 3 | – | 6 | – | 0 |
| Howard | 1 | – | 5 | – | 0 | 1 | – | 8 | – | 0 |
| Shaw | 1 | – | 8 | – | 0 | 1 | – | 8 | – | 0 |
| Saint Paul's (VA) | 0 | – | 6 | – | 0 | 0 | – | 8 | – | 0 |
$ – Conference champion

The 1961 North Carolina College Eagles football team was an American football team that represented North Carolina College (NCC) as a member of the Central Intercollegiate Athletic Association (CIAA) during the 1961 college football season. In their 17th season under head coach Herman Riddick, the Eagles compiled a 7–0–2 record (5–0–2 in conference games), won the CIAA championship, and outscored opponents by a total of 150 to 40. It was NCC's fourth CIAA championship since 1953.

Amos Thornton broke the school's single-season scoring record. He scored nine touchdowns in the first eight games.

The team played its home games at O'Kelly Field in Durham, North Carolina.

== Schedule ==
| Date | Opponent | Site | Result | Attendance | Source |
|---|---|---|---|---|---|
| September 23 | at Allen* | Columbia, SC | W 19–6 | | |
| September 30 | Morgan State | O'Kelly Field; Durham, NC | W 21–0 | 4,500 | |
| October 7 | St. Augustine's | Raleigh, NC | W 14–0 | | |
| October 14 | Virginia State | O'Kelly Field; Durham, NC | T 6–6 | | |
| October 21 | at Maryland State | Princess Anne, MD | T 0–0 | | |
| October 28 | Shaw | O'Kelly Field; Durham, NC | W 26–0 | | |
| November 3 | at Morris Brown* | Herndon Stadium; Atlanta, GA | W 31–21 | | |
| November 11 | Virginia Union^{†} | O'Kelly Field; Durham, NC | W 20–7 | | |
| November 23 | at North Carolina A&T | Greensboro, NC (Carolina Classic) | W 13–0 | | |
*Non-conference game; ^{†}Homecoming
