= Bert Piggott =

American football player and coach (1920–1999)

Bert Piggott Sr.
- Piggott in 1967

No. 84
- Position: Halfback

Personal information
- Born: March 5, 1920; Norge, Virginia, U.S.
- Died: January 10, 1999 (aged 78); Greensboro, North Carolina, U.S.
- Listed height: 6 ft 2 in (1.88 m)
- Listed weight: 195 lb (88 kg)

Career information
- High school: Hinsdale (Hinsdale, Illinois)
- College: Illinois

Career history

Playing
- Los Angeles Dons (1947)

Coaching
- North Carolina A&T (1946–1956) Backfield coach; North Carolina A&T (1957–1967) Head coach

Operations
- North Carolina A&T (1980–1982) Athletic director

Career AAFC statistics
- Games played: 13
- Starts: 2
- Yards rushing: 161 (3.5 average)
- Yards receiving: 63 (9.0 average)
- Touchdowns: 1
- Interceptions: 1

Bert Cody Piggott Sr. (Pronounced: PIG-et) (March 5, 1920 – January 10, 1999) was an American football player and coach. He played college football at the University of Illinois, where he was a member of that school's victorious 1947 Rose Bowl team, going on to play one year as a halfback for the Los Angeles Dons of the All-America Football Conference (AAFC).

Piggott later served as the head football coach at North Carolina A&T University from 1957 to 1967, before being made athletic director and head of the school's physical education department.

== Biography ==
=== Early life ===
Bert Piggott was born March 5, 1920, in Norge, Virginia, an unincorporated community in James City County near Williamsburg. His mother, Victoria Piggott, died when Bert was five and his father Arthur, unable to raise Bert and his siblings, sent them to live with relatives. Bert was sent to live with an aunt in Hinsdale, Illinois, a suburb of Chicago. It was there he spent his formative years, attending Hinsdale Township High School.

Gifted athletically, as a high schooler Piggott was a star in four sports — football, baseball, boxing, and tennis.

He would win the Illinois state high school boxing championship in the heavyweight division. He graduated from Hinsdale High in June 1939.

=== College football and World War II ===
Piggott attended the University of Illinois, where he showed excellent passing skills as a member of the freshman team in 1939 season. After his promotion to the varsity in 1940, Piggott was shifted to fullback, where he played a reserve role.

His chance to play on the varsity came as a junior in mid-October 1941, when starting fullback Myron Pfeifer suffered a sprained ankle, thrusting Piggott into the spotlight in a game against Notre Dame.

Bert Piggott in a leather helmet as a member of the Los Angeles Dons in 1947.

Following spring practice for the forthcoming 1942 season, what was supposed to be his senior year, Piggott was projected as the team's reserve blocking back in new Illinois head coach Ray Eliot's single-wing offense. Piggott was declared ineligible ahead of the 1942 season, however, for reasons unspecified in the press.

World War II intervened. Piggott became part of the United States Army Air Forces, serving as a physical training officer for cadets at Tuskegee Air Fields at Tuskegee, Alabama, attaining the rank of corporal. He also played service football for the Tuskegee War Hawks in 1944 and 1945, gaining accolades as a "rip-roaring University of Illinois star" at the single-wing blocking back position. In the first game of the 1945 season, Piggott hit a 50-yard touchdown pass to teammate Jerry Williams, formerly of Miami of Ohio, helping to lead Tuskeegee to a 25–0 shutout victory over the LeJeune Panthers, members of the US Marines.

After the war Piggott returned to Champaign to resume his college career at Illinois, where he was a backfield teammate of future NFL Pro Bowler Buddy Young. In his second go-round as a senior he was part of the 1946 team that was the representative of the Big Nine Conference to the 1947 Rose Bowl game, beating the previously undefeated UCLA Bruins by a score of 45–14.

=== Professional career ===
Piggott played one year of professional football, joining the Los Angeles Dons of the All-America Football Conference (AAFC) for the 1947 season. A pioneer African-American player in professional athletics, Piggott saw action at halfback in 13 games for the Dons, including two games as part of the team's starting eleven. He carried the ball 46 times for 161 yards during the year, also snagging 7 passes for 63 yards through the air. He also returned punts and kickoffs for the Dons during his year with "America's Most Colorful Team."

A contract was signed with the Dons for the 1948 season in June of that year. After playing throughout the preseason, he was uncermoniously cut by the team, together with end Ezzrett "Sugarfoot" Anderson, on the eve of the team's August 27 season opener against the Chicago Rockets. This puzzling roster move left halfback Linwood Sexton and center John Brown the only two black players on the Dons' roster in 1948.

Fred Leigh, a columnist for the Washington Afro American, intimated that racial motives were at play behind the unexplained cut of Piggott and Anderson, asserting the two black second-year players were reckoned to have "outplayed a lot of teammates" who were kept. Leigh charged that "Critics say that coach Jimmy Phelan, who replaced [Dudley] Degroot, never relished the idea of having colored players on his teams, even when he coached at St. Mary's and at Washington State."

=== Coach and administrator ===
Piggott earned both undergraduate and graduate degrees from the University of Illinois, earning a Master of Science in physical education in 1949. Following graduation from Illinois, he took a position at North Carolina A&T, a historically black college, where he was named assistant football coach in charge of the backfield ahead of the 1949 season. The offer of an assistant coaching post at A&T was made by head coach William M. Bell, Piggott's head coach with the Tuskegee War Hawks during the war.

He was named head coach for track and field not later than 1951. He also coached boxing at the school, with his A&T boxing team capturing the Central Intercollegiate Athletic Association (CIAA) championship in March 1955.

Another task was added to Piggott's portfolio in 1956, when he was named head coach of the A&T baseball team — a unit coming off a CIAA crown of their own in 1955.

In June 1957, North Carolina head football coach Bill Bell was forced out by boosters after a disappointing 1956 season and Piggott was named his successor. He remained at the helm as head coach for 11 years, compiling a record of 55–39–2 and leading the Aggies to three conference championships. Piggott stepped down from that position at the end of the 1967 season and later became the chair of the Health, Physical Education, and Recreation Department. In 1980, Piggot was appointed as North Carolina A&T's athletic director. At the time of his retirement, Piggott was considered the most successful coach in school history.

He continued to pursue his education, completing work on a doctorate degree at University of North Carolina at Greensboro in 1975, at the age of 55.

=== Death and legacy ===
Piggott died January 10, 1999, in Greensboro, North Carolina, of pancreatic cancer. He was 78 years old at the time of his death. He was remembered by North Carolina A&T basketball coach Cal Irvin as a caring individual and who inspired and motivated his charges at a high level.

One of his former players at North Carolina A&T, quarterback Jesse Jackson, provided a written tribute for Piggott's funeral, recalling that his coach had taught members of the team discipline and manners. "He told us that dignity was non-negotiable," Jackson wrote. "Our football team members helped to lead the drive to desegregate Greensboro, to create bridges between black and white. He encouraged us. We never lost any points for demonstrating or going to jail for dignity."

In his letter, Jackson recounted the story of the August 1963 March on Washington. With fall practice already underway, many other coaches threatened to throw players off the team, rescinding scholarships, if they chose to miss practice to travel to the demonstration. Jackson felt the need and obligation to march and phoned Coach Piggott. Jackson recalled: "He said, 'We'll be a few days late and we'll have to work harder. But if you feel compelled to make that stand for dignity, I stand with you.' He put winning and losing in perspective. All that I do and all the places I go, Bert Piggott is central to my life..."

Piggott's son, Bert Piggott Jr., became a radiologist and accomplished jazz musician.

== Head coaching record ==
=== Football ===
Year	Team	Overall	Conference	Standing	Bowl/playoffs
North Carolina A&T Aggies (Central Intercollegiate Athletic Association) (1957–1967)
1957	North Carolina A&T	4–3–1	4–2	2nd	
1958	North Carolina A&T	7–2	6–0	1st	
1959	North Carolina A&T	6–2	5–0	1st	
1960	North Carolina A&T	5–3–1	4–1–1	2nd	
1961	North Carolina A&T	5–4	5–1	2nd	
1962	North Carolina A&T	7–3	6–1	T–2nd	
1963	North Carolina A&T	7–3	5–2	3rd	
1964	North Carolina A&T	6–3–1	6–0–1	1st	
1965	North Carolina A&T	4–6	4–3	5th	
1966	North Carolina A&T	3–6	3–4	10th	
1967	North Carolina A&T	3–5–1	3–3–1	5th	
North Carolina A&T:		57–40–4	51–17–3		
Total:		57–40–4			
National championship Conference title Conference division title or championship game berth
