= Ulysses S. Washington =

American football player, coach, and educator (1920–2018)

Biographical details
- Born: July 16, 1920; Dillwyn, Virginia, U.S.
- Died: October 25, 2018 (aged 98); Dover, Delaware, U.S.

Playing career
- c. 1939 – 1942: Virginia State

Coaching career (HC unless noted)
- 1950–1964: Delaware State (assistant)
- 1965–1966: Delaware State
- 1967: Delaware State (assistant)

Administrative career (AD unless noted)
- 1986: Delaware State (interim AD)

Head coaching record
- Overall: 7–10

Ulysses Samuel Washington Jr. (July 16, 1920 – October 25, 2018) was an American college football coach and long-time educator at Delaware State University.

== Biography ==
Washington attended Virginia State University in Petersburg, Virginia and played on the football team. After that, he earned a master's degree at Rutgers University and began his teaching career as an assistant professor of agriculture education and farm mechanics in 1949 at Delaware State University. In 1950, Washington became an assistant coach for the Hornets football program and served at this capacity through 1964. He spent 1965 and 1966 as the head coach and compiled a record of 7–10–0. Washington returned for one more season to once again serve as an assistant coach.

In 1971, Washington became chair of the Department of Agriculture and Natural Resources, a position which he held until his retirement at the end of the 1990–91 academic year.

Washington was the first person in his family to graduate from college and was the father of Ukee Washington, a television news anchor in Philadelphia, Pennsylvania.

== Head coaching record ==
Year	Team	Overall	Conference	Standing	Bowl/playoffs
Delaware State Hornets (Central Intercollegiate Athletic Association) (1965–1966)
1965	Delaware State	4–5	3–3	10th	
1966	Delaware State	3–5	2–4	14th	
Delaware State:		7–10	5–7		
Total:		7–10			
