= 1963 Eau Claire State Blugolds football team =

American college football season

1963 Eau Claire State Blugolds football

WSCC champion
- Conference: Wisconsin State College Conference
- Record: 7–0 (6–0 WSCC)
- Head coach: James J. Rice (7th season)
- Home stadium: Carson Park

1963 Wisconsin State College Conference football standings
	Conf.					Overall
Team	W		L		T	W		L		T
No. 13 Eau Claire State $	6	–	0	–	0	7	–	0	–	0
Stevens Point State	6	–	1	–	0	6	–	2	–	0
Whitewater State	5	–	2	–	0	6	–	3	–	0
Superior State	4	–	2	–	0	5	–	4	–	0
Platteville State	3	–	3	–	0	3	–	5	–	0
River Falls State	3	–	3	–	1	4	–	3	–	2
Stout State	2	–	4	–	1	2	–	5	–	1
Milwaukee	1	–	4	–	1	1	–	6	–	1
Oshkosh State	0	–	5	–	2	0	–	5	–	2
La Crosse State	0	–	6	–	1	0	–	8	–	1
$ – Conference champion; Rankings from NAIA poll

The 1963 Eau Claire State Blugolds football team was an American football team that represented Wisconsin State College at Eau Claire (now known as the University of Wisconsin–Eau Claire) as a member of the Wisconsin State College Conference (WSCC) during the 1963 NAIA football season. In their seventh year under head coach James J. Rice, the Blugolds compiled a perfect 7–0 record (6–0 in conference play), won the WSCC championship, and outscored opponents by a total of 122 to 55. It was Eau Claire's first undefeated season since 1920.

Junior quarterback Jim Van Gorden led the WSCC in passing with an average of 133.3 passing yars per game. He also set six school records. The Blugolds also led the WSCC in pass defense, giving up only 52.5 passing yards per game.

The team's statistical leaders included Van Gorden with 764 passing yards, eight interceptions, and ten touchdown passes; Ray Cheyka with 321 rushing yards on 89 carries; and Gerry Gendron with 20 pass receptions for 315 yards and six touchdowns.

Four Eau Claire players were selected as first-team players on the 1963 All-WSCC football team: Van Gorden at quarterback; Dave La Viollette at halfback; Gerry Gendron at offensive end; and Gene Golden at defensive end. Other players received honorable mention: fullback Ray Cheyka; offensive guard Pat Page; offensive tackle Ken Hoffman; defensive guard Jerry Gourink; linebackers Marv Holptas and Ken Biegel; and defensive backs Dennis Rivers and Pat Fraley.

The team played its home games at Carson Park in Eau Claire, Wisconsin.

== Schedule ==
Date	Opponent	Site	Result	Attendance	Source
September 14	Winona State*	Carson Park; Eau Claire, WI	W 27–8		
September 21	at Whitewater State	Whitewater, WI	W 14–12		
September 28	at River Falls State	Ramer Field; River Falls, WI	W 14–7	4,500	
October 5	Oshkosh State	Carson Park; Eau Claire, WI	W 19–7		
October 12	at Stout State	Nelson Field; Menomonie, WI	W 12–2		
October 19	La Crosse State^{†}	Carson Park; Eau Claire, WI	W 22–13	5,000	
October 26	Superior State	Carson Park; Eau Claire, WI	W 14–6	6,000	
*Non-conference game; ^{†}Homecoming
