= 1963 Tennessee A&I Tigers football team =

American college football season

1963 Tennessee A&I Tigers football

MWAA champion
- Conference: Midwest Athletic Association
- Record: 6–3 (3–0 MWAA)
- Head coach: John Merritt (1st season)
- Home stadium: Hale Stadium

1963 Midwest Athletic Association football standings
	Conf.					Overall
Team	W		L		T	W		L		T
No. 11 Tennessee A&I $	3	–	0	–	0	6	–	3	–	0
Lincoln (MO)	2	–	1	–	0	5	–	5	–	0
Kentucky State	1	–	2	–	0	5	–	4	–	0
Central State (OH)	0	–	3	–	0	4	–	5	–	0
$ – Conference champion; Rankings from Pittsburgh Courier

The 1963 Tennessee A&I Tigers football team represented Tennessee Agricultural & Industrial State College (now known as Tennessee State University) as a member of the Midwest Athletic Association (MWAA) during the 1963 NCAA College Division football season. Led by first-year head coach John Merritt, the Tigers compiled an overall record of 6–3, with a 3–0 conference record, and finished as MWAA champion.

== Schedule ==
Date	Opponent	Site	Result	Attendance	Source
September 21	at Morris Brown*	Herndon Stadium; Atlanta, GA	W 14–7	8,000	
September 28	North Carolina A&T*	Hale Stadium; Nashville, TN	L 18–20	2,000	
October 5	Grambling*	Hale Stadium; Nashville, TN	L 14–26	6,000	
October 19	Central State (OH)	Hale Stadium; Nashville, TN	W 16–7	5,000	
October 26	Florida A&M*	Hale Stadium; Nashville, TN	W 14–12	11,000	
November 2	at Southern*	University Stadium; Baton Rouge, LA	L 9–21	12,000	
November 9	at Lincoln (MO)	Lincoln Field; Jefferson City, MO	W 14–10	1,800	
November 16	at Kentucky State	Alumni Field; Frankfort, KY	W 26–14	2,000	
November 28	Langston*^{†}	Hale Stadium; Nashville, TN	W 36–8	8,023	
*Non-conference game; ^{†}Homecoming
