= North Carolina A&T–Winston-Salem State rivalry =

American college football rivalries

- North Carolina A&T Aggies Winston-Salem State Rams
- First meeting: October 25, 1952; North Carolina A&T, 44–0
- Latest meeting: September 7, 2024; North Carolina A&T, 27–20^{OT}

Statistics
- Total meetings: 47
- All-time series: North Carolina A&T leads, 35–12 (.745)
- Largest victory: North Carolina A&T, 60–0 (1968)
- Longest win streak: North Carolina A&T, 18 (1952–1969)
- Current win streak: North Carolina A&T, 1 (2024)

The rivalry is driven by the proximity of the two schools, as both are only 30 miles apart via interstates 40 & 85 and in neighboring Guilford and Forsyth counties.

The North Carolina A&T–Winston-Salem State rivalry is an ongoing series of athletic competitions between historic rivals North Carolina Agricultural and Technical State University and Winston-Salem State University, both of which are located in the state of North Carolina. The intensity of the rivalry is driven by the proximity of the two schools, as both are only 30 miles apart via U.S. Interstate 40; the size of the two schools, as North Carolina A&T is the largest Historically Black College and University in the state and Winston-Salem State is the third largest; coaching personnel, and conference alignments, as both schools at one time were both members of either the Central Intercollegiate Athletic Association (CIAA) or the Mid-Eastern Athletic Conference (MEAC). Although a less intense and bitter rivalry than that shared between North Carolina A&T and North Carolina Central University, both A&T and WSSU fans placed great emphasis on this rivalry.

Since Winston-Salem State's 2010 decision to discontinue the transition to the NCAA's Division I citing financial reasons, this rivalry has been placed on hold for the foreseeable future. The schools announced on November 23, 2020, that they would renew the rivalry with a game on September 7, 2024, at NC A&T's Truist Stadium, formerly Aggie Stadium.

== Football ==
The most prominent sport in the rivalry is football. The two teams have been competing against each other since 1952. In the most recent contest, Winston-Salem State defeated the Aggies in a 21–14 come from behind victory in North Carolina A&T's Aggie Stadium. The two schools have played 46 times since 1952, with periods of time in the 1970s and early 2000s where the two teams did not meet. Since the beginning of the series, North Carolina A&T leads with an all-time record of 34 wins to 12.

In the early years of the series, the A&T dominated Winston-Salem State with an 18-game winning streak from 1952 to 1969. In 1977, under the leadership of coach William "Bill" Hayes, Winston-Salem State earned their first win against the Aggies with a 33–14 victory. Winston-Salem State earned 4 consecutive victories in the series against A&T from 1982 through 1985. On September 12, 1981, Winston-Salem State was the first opponent to play in the then newly built Aggie Stadium. The contest was held in front of an overflow crowd of more than 23,000 fans.

From 2000 to 2005, the series was placed on hiatus. In 2006, Winston-Salem State defeated A&T 41–14 in Greensboro, bringing the all-time record to 33–9 in favor of the Aggies. The September 1, 2007, contest set a Bowman Gray Stadium attendance record of 22,000 spectators in attendance. The game saw the Rams defeat the Aggies 28–7.

== Game results ==
North Carolina A&T victories	Winston-Salem State victories

No.	Date	Location	Winner	Score
1	October 25, 1952	Bowman Gray Stadium	NC A&T	44–0
2	October 24, 1953	War Memorial Stadium	NC A&T	26–6
3	October 23, 1954	Bowman Gray Stadium	NC A&T	41–0
4	October 22, 1955	War Memorial Stadium	NC A&T	32–6
5	October 20, 1956	Bowman Gray Stadium	NC A&T	34–13
6	October 26, 1957	War Memorial Stadium	NC A&T	41–0
7	October 25, 1958	Bowman Gray Stadium	NC A&T	14–12
8	October 24, 1959	War Memorial Stadium	NC A&T	23–18
9	October 22, 1960	Bowman Gray Stadium	NC A&T	21–6
10	October 21, 1961	War Memorial Stadium	NC A&T	27–20
11	October 20, 1962	Bowman Gray Stadium	NC A&T	32–6
12	October 26, 1963	War Memorial Stadium	NC A&T	60–18
13	October 24, 1964	Bowman Gray Stadium	NC A&T	50–12
14	October 23, 1965	War Memorial Stadium	NC A&T	30–20
15	October 22, 1966	Bowman Gray Stadium	NC A&T	56–0
16	October 21, 1967	War Memorial Stadium	NC A&T	54–6
17	October 26, 1968	Bowman Gray Stadium	NC A&T	60–0
18	October 25, 1969	War Memorial Stadium	NC A&T	37–7
19	September 3, 1977	War Memorial Stadium	WSSU	33–14
20	September 2, 1978	Groves Stadium	WSSU	25–7
21	September 1, 1979	Groves Stadium	NC A&T	14–7
22	September 13, 1980	Groves Stadium	NC A&T	28–21
23	September 12, 1981	Aggie Stadium	NC A&T	21–10
24	September 11, 1982	Groves Stadium	WSSU	21–14

No.	Date	Location	Winner	Score
25	September 10, 1983	Groves Stadium	WSSU	34–24
26	September 8, 1984	Aggie Stadium	WSSU	35–21
27	September 14, 1985	Groves Stadium	WSSU	34–25
28	September 13, 1986	Aggie Stadium	NC A&T	28–21
29	September 12, 1987	Bowman Gray Stadium	NC A&T	24–10
30	September 10, 1988	Aggie Stadium	WSSU	26–6
31	September 9, 1989	Bowman Gray Stadium	WSSU	48–19
32	September 8, 1990	Aggie Stadium	NC A&T	27–21
33	September 14, 1991	Bowman Gray Stadium	WSSU	13–10
34	September 12, 1992	Aggie Stadium	NC A&T	21–7
35	September 11, 1993	Bowman Gray Stadium	NC A&T	49–21
36	September 10, 1994	Aggie Stadium	NC A&T	53–7
37	September 9, 1995	Bowman Gray Stadium	NC A&T	45–21
38	September 7, 1996	Aggie Stadium	NC A&T	31–7
39	September 6, 1997	Bowman Gray Stadium	NC A&T	27–7
40	September 12, 1998	Aggie Stadium	NC A&T	20–12
41	September 11, 1999	Bowman Gray Stadium	NC A&T	20–7
42	September 2, 2006	Aggie Stadium	WSSU	41–14
43	September 1, 2007	Bowman Gray Stadium	WSSU	28–7
44	September 6, 2008	Aggie Stadium	NC A&T	14–8
45	September 5, 2009	Bowman Gray Stadium	NC A&T	19–10
46	September 4, 2010	Aggie Stadium	WSSU	21–14
47	September 7, 2024	Truist Stadium	NC A&T	27–20^{OT}
Series: North Carolina A&T leads 35–12

== See also ==
- List of NCAA college football rivalry games
