= Roy D. Moore =

American football and basketball coach (1921–2014)

Biographical details
- Born: June 8, 1921; Charlotte, North Carolina, U.S.
- Died: May 12, 2014 (aged 92); Greensboro, North Carolina, U.S.

Coaching career (HC unless noted)

Football
- 1948–1954: St. Augustine's
- 1956–1959: South Carolina State
- 1960–1964: Delaware State

Head coaching record
- Overall: 78–59–3

Roy Douglas "DD" Moore (June 8, 1921 – May 12, 2014) was an American football and basketball coach.

== Early life ==
Moore was born in Charlotte, North Carolina in 1921 and attended North Carolina College from 1940, where he played football. After serving as a lieutenant in a United States Army radar unit during World War II, he resumed his education and graduated with a Bachelor of Science in 1947. He studied at the University of Illinois at Urbana–Champaign, receiving an MS in 1948 and a Ph.D. in 1967.

== Coaching career ==
Moore became football and basketball coach at St. Augustine's College in 1948. He was Central Intercollegiate Athletic Association (CIAA) Football Coach of the Year in 1950 and 1953 CIAA Basketball Coach of the Year. He served as the head football coach at South Carolina State College—now known as South Carolina State University—from 1955 to 1959 and Delaware State College—now known as Delaware State University—from 1960 to 1964. His record was 20–13–1 at South Carolina State and 19–24–1 at Delaware State.

Moore led the Health, Physical Education, and Recreational Department at North Carolina A&T State University for 20 years, retiring in 1986.

== Honors ==
Moore was inducted into the CIAA Hall of Fame in 2004. In 2013, he was honored in the House of Representatives for his community work by Congress member Mel Watt.

== Head coaching record ==
Year	Team	Overall	Conference	Standing	Bowl/playoffs
St. Augustine's Falcons (Central Intercollegiate Athletic Association) (1948–1954)
1948	St. Augustine's	4–4	1–4	15th	
1949	St. Augustine's	6–2	5–2	5th	
1950	St. Augustine's	8–1	6–1	5th	
1951	St. Augustine's	3–6	2–5	14th	
1952	St. Augustine's	7–2	5–2	9th	
1953	St. Augustine's	3–4–1	2–4	T–10th	
1954	St. Augustine's	6–3	6–2	T–4th	
St. Augustine's:		37–22–1	27–20		
South Carolina State Bulldogs (Southern Intercollegiate Athletic Conference) (1956–1959)
1956	South Carolina State	5–4	3–4	9th	
1957	South Carolina State	5–2–1	4–2–1	4th	
1958	South Carolina State	7–2	7–1	T–2nd	
1959	South Carolina State	4–5	3–3	8th	
South Carolina State:		21–13–1	17–10–1		
Delaware State Hornets (Central Intercollegiate Athletic Association) (1960–1964)
1960	Delaware State	4–4	4–3	8th	
1961	Delaware State	6–3	5–2	6th	
1962	Delaware State	4–5	3–4	T–12th	
1963	Delaware State	2–5–1	1–5	T–16th	
1964	Delaware State	3–7	3–5	12th	
Delaware State:		19–24–1	16–19		
Total:		78–59–3			
