= Herman Riddick =

American football player and coach (1907–1968)

- Riddick pictured in The Maroon and Grey 1946, North Carolina Central yearbook

Biographical details
- Born: July 28, 1907; Gates County, North Carolina, U.S.
- Died: September 26, 1968 (aged 61); Durham, North Carolina, U.S.

Playing career
- 1930–1932: North Carolina College

Coaching career (HC unless noted)
- 1936–1944: Hillside HS (NC)
- 1945–1964: North Carolina College

Head coaching record
- Overall: 111–57–11 (college); 82–5–3 (high school)
- Bowls: 1–0

Accomplishments and honors

Championships
- 1 black college national (1954); 4 CIAA (1953–1954, 1956, 1961, 1963)

Herman Henry Riddick (July 28, 1907 – September 26, 1968) was an American football coach. He was the ninth head football coach at North Carolina College at Durham—now known as North Carolina Central University, serving for 20 seasons, from 1945 to 1964, and compiling a record of 112–57–10. His tenure is the longest of any coach in the history of the North Carolina Central Eagles football program.

A native of Gatesville, North Carolina, Riddick played college football at North Carolina College before graduating with a bachelor's degree in 1933. He began his coaching career in 1936 at Hillside High School, in Durham, North Carolina. Riddick died on September 26, 1968, in Durham.

== Head coaching record ==
=== College ===
| Year | Team | Overall | Conference | Standing | Bowl/playoffs |
|---|---|---|---|---|---|
North Carolina College Eagles (Colored/Central Intercollegiate Athletic Association) (1945–1964)
| 1945 | North Carolina College | 6–3 | 5–1 | 3rd | |
| 1946 | North Carolina College | 7–3 | 5–3 | 6th | |
| 1947 | North Carolina College | 2–7 | 2–6 | 12th | |
| 1948 | North Carolina College | 6–3–1 | 4–3–1 | 7th | |
| 1949 | North Carolina College | 4–5 | 3–4 | 8th | |
| 1950 | North Carolina College | 7–2 | 6–1 | 2nd | |
| 1951 | North Carolina College | 7–2–1 | 5–1–1 | 3rd | |
| 1952 | North Carolina College | 4–4 | 4–2 | 2nd | |
| 1953 | North Carolina College | 5–3 | 5–1 | 1st | |
| 1954 | North Carolina College | 7–1–1 | 6–0–1 | 1st | W National Classic |
| 1955 | North Carolina College | 4–1–2 | 3–1–2 | 4th | |
| 1956 | North Carolina College | 5–2–2 | 5–0–2 | T–1st | |
| 1957 | North Carolina College | 5–4 | 4–3 | 3rd | |
| 1958 | North Carolina College | 7–2 | 5–1 | 2nd | |
| 1959 | North Carolina College | 4–4–1 | 3–3 | 8th | |
| 1960 | North Carolina College | 7–2 | 5–2 | 3rd | |
| 1961 | North Carolina College | 7–0–2 | 5–0–2 | 1st | |
| 1962 | North Carolina College | 6–3 | 4–3 | 7th | |
| 1963 | North Carolina College | 8–1 | 6–1 | 1st | |
| 1964 | North Carolina College | 4–5 | 2–5 | 13th | |
| North Carolina College: | | 112–57–10 | 87–41–9 | | |
| Total: | | 112–57–10 | | | |
National championship Conference title Conference division title or championship game berth
