= 1963 Alcorn A&M Braves football team =

American college football season

1963 Alcorn A&M Braves football
- Conference: Southwestern Athletic Conference
- Record: 3–7 (0–7 SWAC)
- Head coach: Frank Purnell (4th season)
- Home stadium: Henderson Stadium

1963 Southwestern Athletic Conference football standings
	Conf.					Overall
Team	W		L		T	W		L		T
No. 5 Prairie View A&M $^	7	–	0	–	0	10	–	1	–	0
Southern	5	–	2	–	0	7	–	3	–	0
Texas Southern	5	–	2	–	0	7	–	3	–	0
Grambling	3	–	3	–	1	5	–	3	–	1
Arkansas AM&N	3	–	3	–	1	5	–	4	–	1
Jackson State	2	–	5	–	0	4	–	5	–	0
Wiley	2	–	5	–	0	4	–	5	–	0
Alcorn A&M	0	–	7	–	0	3	–	7	–	0
$ – Conference champion; ^ – NAIA playoff participant; Rankings from NAIA poll

The 1963 Alcorn A&M Braves football team represented Alcorn A&M College (now known as Alcorn State University) as a member of the Southwestern Athletic Conference (SWAC) during the 1963 NCAA College Division football season. Led by fourth-year head coach Frank Purnell, the Braves compiled an overall record of 3–7, with a conference record of 0–7, and finished eighth in the SWAC.

== Schedule ==
Date	Opponent	Site	Result	Attendance	Source
September 14	vs. Mississippi Industrial*	Clarksdale, MS	W 31–16	3,000	
September 21	Grambling	Henderson Stadium; Lorman, MS	L 23–40		
September 28	at Wiley	Wildcat Stadium; Marshall, TX	L 7–10		
October 5	at Rust*	Holly Springs, MS	W 29–6		
October 12	at Jackson State	Alumni Field; Jackson, MS (rivalry)	L 13–22		
October 19	at Texas Southern	Jeppesen Stadium; Houston, TX	L 22–38	5,000–5,400	
October 26	at Southern	University Stadium; Baton Rouge, LA	L 19–27	15,000	
November 2	Arkansas AM&N	Henderson Stadium; Lorman, MS	L 10–21		
November 9	Mississippi Vocational*	Henderson Stadium; Lorman, MS	W 32–18		
November 13	Prairie View A&M	Henderson Stadium; Lorman, MS	L 20–44		
*Non-conference game
