= 1966 Delaware State Hornets football team =

American college football season

1966 Delaware State Hornets football
- Conference: Central Intercollegiate Athletic Association
- Record: 3–5 (2–4 CIAA)
- Head coach: Ulysses S. Washington (2nd season)
- Home stadium: Alumni Stadium

1966 Central Intercollegiate Athletic Association football standings
	Conf.					Overall
Team	W		L		T	W		L		T
Morgan State $	8	–	0	–	0	9	–	0	–	0
North Carolina College	6	–	3	–	0	6	–	3	–	0
Livingstone	5	–	1	–	1	6	–	3	–	1
Johnson C. Smith	3	–	2	–	1	3	–	5	–	1
Hampton	5	–	2	–	0	6	–	3	–	0
Elizabeth City State	5	–	3	–	0	5	–	3	–	0
Maryland State	3	–	3	–	0	5	–	3	–	0
Virginia Union	4	–	4	–	0	4	–	4	–	0
Norfolk State	3	–	5	–	0	3	–	5	–	0
North Carolina A&T	3	–	4	–	0	3	–	6	–	0
Fayetteville State	2	–	3	–	1	3	–	4	–	1
Howard	2	–	3	–	0	4	–	4	–	0
Virginia State	3	–	5	–	0	3	–	5	–	0
Delaware State	2	–	4	–	0	3	–	5	–	0
Winston-Salem State	2	–	5	–	0	2	–	6	–	0
Saint Paul's (VA)	1	–	6	–	1	1	–	7	–	1
Shaw	0	–	7	–	2	0	–	7	–	2
$ – Conference champion

The 1966 Delaware State Hornets football team represented Delaware State College—now known as Delaware State University—as a member of the Central Intercollegiate Athletic Association (CIAA) in the 1966 NCAA College Division football season. Led by second-year head coach Ulysses S. Washington, the Hornets compiled an overall record of 3–5 and a mark of 2–4 in conference play, placing 14th in CIAA.

== Schedule ==
Date	Opponent	Site	Result	Source
September 24	at Mansfield*	Mansfield, PA	L 0–20	
October 1	Hampton	Alumni Stadium; Dover, DE	L 0–6	
October 8	at Howard	Washington, DC	W 26–16	
October 15	Saint Paul's (VA)	Alumni Stadium; Dover, DE	L 0–12	
October 22	at Morgan State	Hughes Stadium; Baltimore, MD	L 6–38	
October 29	Montclair State*	Alumni Stadium; Dover, DE	W 22–6	
November 5	at Elizabeth City State	Elizabeth City, NC	W 12–6	
November 12	at Maryland State	Princess Anne, MD	L 6–52	
*Non-conference game
