= 1965 Delaware State Hornets football team =

American college football season

1965 Delaware State Hornets football
- Conference: Central Intercollegiate Athletic Association
- Record: 4–5 (3–3 CIAA)
- Head coach: Ulysses S. Washington (1st season)
- Home stadium: Alumni Stadium

1965 Central Intercollegiate Athletic Association football standings
	Conf.					Overall
Team	W		L		T	W		L		T
No. 3 Morgan State $	8	–	0	–	0	9	–	0	–	0
Johnson C. Smith	5	–	1	–	0	5	–	4	–	0
Maryland State	5	–	1	–	0	5	–	2	–	0
St. Augustine's	6	–	1	–	1	8	–	1	–	1
North Carolina A&T	4	–	3	–	0	4	–	6	–	0
Delaware State	3	–	3	–	0	4	–	5	–	0
Virginia State	5	–	4	–	0	5	–	4	–	0
Saint Paul's (VA)	4	–	3	–	0	5	–	3	–	0
North Carolina College	3	–	4	–	1	3	–	5	–	1
Howard	2	–	3	–	0	5	–	3	–	0
Norfolk State	4	–	4	–	0	4	–	4	–	0
Virginia Union	3	–	5	–	0	3	–	5	–	0
Livingstone	3	–	5	–	0	3	–	5	–	0
Shaw	4	–	5	–	0	4	–	5	–	0
Elizabeth City State	3	–	5	–	0	3	–	5	–	0
Winston-Salem State	2	–	6	–	0	2	–	7	–	0
Fayetteville State	1	–	5	–	0	1	–	6	–	0
Hampton	0	–	7	–	0	1	–	8	–	0
$ – Conference champion; Rankings from NAIA poll

The 1965 Delaware State Hornets football team represented Delaware State College—now known as Delaware State University—as a member of the Central Intercollegiate Athletic Association (CIAA) in the 1965 NCAA College Division football season. Led by first-year head coach Ulysses S. Washington, the Hornets compiled an overall record of 4–5 and a mark of 3–3 in conference play, placing sixth in CIAA. The Hornets started the season 4–0, before losing 34–0 against undefeated Morgan State on October 23. The loss to Morgan State was the first of five consecutive defeats to close Delaware State's season.

== Schedule ==
Date	Opponent	Site	Result	Attendance	Source
September 18	Mansfield*	Alumni Stadium; Dover, DE	W 26–13		
September 25	Virginia State	Alumni Stadium; Dover, DE	W 20–13		
October 2	at Hampton	Armstrong Stadium; Hampton, VA	W 30–13		
October 9	Howard	Alumni Stadium; Dover, DE	W 6–0		
October 23	Morgan State	Alumni Stadium; Dover, DE	L 0–34	5,100	
October 30	at Montclair State*	Clifton Stadium; Upper Montclair, NJ	L 7–26	4,000	
November 6	at Saint Paul's (VA)	Lawrenceville, VA	L 14–20		
November 13	Maryland State	Alumni Stadium; Dover, DE	L 6–41		
November 20	C. W. Post*	Alumni Stadium; Dover, DE	L 0–35	250	
*Non-conference game
