= 1963 Arkansas AM&N Golden Lions football team =

American college football season

1963 Arkansas AM&N Golden Lions football
- Conference: Southwestern Athletic Conference
- Record: 5–4–1 (3–3–1 SWAC)
- Head coach: Vannette W. Johnson (2nd season)
- Home stadium: Pumphrey Stadium

1963 Southwestern Athletic Conference football standings
	Conf.					Overall
Team	W		L		T	W		L		T
No. 5 Prairie View A&M $^	7	–	0	–	0	10	–	1	–	0
Southern	5	–	2	–	0	7	–	3	–	0
Texas Southern	5	–	2	–	0	7	–	3	–	0
Grambling	3	–	3	–	1	5	–	3	–	1
Arkansas AM&N	3	–	3	–	1	5	–	4	–	1
Jackson State	2	–	5	–	0	4	–	5	–	0
Wiley	2	–	5	–	0	4	–	5	–	0
Alcorn A&M	0	–	7	–	0	3	–	7	–	0
$ – Conference champion; ^ – NAIA playoff participant; Rankings from NAIA poll

The 1963 Arkansas AM&N Golden Lions football team represented the Arkansas Agricultural, Mechanical and Normal College (now known as the University of Arkansas at Pine Bluff) as a member of the Southwestern Athletic Conference (SWAC) during the 1963 NCAA College Division football season. Led by second-year head coach Vannette W. Johnson, the Golden Lions compiled an overall record of 5–4–1, with a conference record of 3–3–1, and finished tied for fourth in the SWAC.

== Schedule ==
Date	Opponent	Site	Result	Attendance	Source
September 21	Lincoln (MO)*	Pumphrey Stadium; Pine Bluff, AR	W 19–6	2,812	
September 28	Jarvis*	Pumphrey Stadium; Pine Bluff, AR	W 77–2	2,145	
October 5	Jackson State	Pumphrey Stadium; Pine Bluff, AR	W 20–6	2,855	
October 12	at Southern	University Stadium; Baton Rouge, LA	L 0–14	14,000	
October 19	Wiley	Pumphrey Stadium; Pine Bluff, AR	W 14–13	2,174	
October 26	Prairie View A&M	Pumphrey Stadium; Pine Bluff, AR	L 21–36	5,198	
November 2	at Alcorn A&M	Henderson Stadium; Lorman, MS	W 21–10	3,000	
November 9	Grambling	Pumphrey Stadium; Pine Bluff, AR	T 7–7	2,599	
November 16	at Texas Southern	Jeppesen Stadium; Houston, TX	L 0–6	5,000	
November 30	at Mississippi Vocational*	Coleman High School Stadium; Greenville, MS	L 15–46		
*Non-conference game
