= 1963 Southern Jaguars football team =

American college football season

1963 Southern Jaguars football
- Conference: Southwestern Athletic Conference
- Record: 7–3 (5–2 SWAC)
- Head coach: Robert Henry Lee (2nd season)
- Home stadium: University Stadium

1963 Southwestern Athletic Conference football standings
	Conf.					Overall
Team	W		L		T	W		L		T
No. 5 Prairie View A&M $^	7	–	0	–	0	10	–	1	–	0
Southern	5	–	2	–	0	7	–	3	–	0
Texas Southern	5	–	2	–	0	7	–	3	–	0
Grambling	3	–	3	–	1	5	–	3	–	1
Arkansas AM&N	3	–	3	–	1	5	–	4	–	1
Jackson State	2	–	5	–	0	4	–	5	–	0
Wiley	2	–	5	–	0	4	–	5	–	0
Alcorn A&M	0	–	7	–	0	3	–	7	–	0
$ – Conference champion; ^ – NAIA playoff participant; Rankings from NAIA poll

The 1963 Southern Jaguars football team was an American football team that represented Southern University as a member of the Southwestern Athletic Conference (SWAC) during the 1963 NCAA College Division football season. Led by Robert Henry Lee in his second season as head coach, the Jaguars compiled an overall record of 7–3, with a mark of 5–2 in conference play, and finished tied for second in the SWAC.

== Schedule ==
Date	Opponent	Site	Result	Attendance	Source
September 21	Texas Southern	University Stadium; Baton Rouge, LA	W 14–6	15,000	
September 28	at Grambling	Grambling Stadium; Grambling, LA (rivalry)	W 22–21		
October 5	Dillard*	University Stadium; Baton Rouge, LA	W 40–0		
October 12	Arkansas AM&N	University Stadium; Baton Rouge, LA	W 14–0	14,000	
October 19	at Jackson State	Alumni Field; Jackson, MS (rivalry)	W 17–16		
October 26	Alcorn A&M	University Stadium; Baton Rouge, LA	W 27–19	15,000	
November 2	Tennessee A&I*	University Stadium; Baton Rouge, LA	W 21–9		
November 9	at Wiley	Wildcat Stadium; Marshall, TX	L 13–16		
November 16	at Florida A&M*	Bragg Memorial Stadium; Tallahassee, FL	L 0–37		
November 23	Prairie View A&M	University Stadium; Baton Rouge, LA	L 0–35		
*Non-conference game
