= 1960 Delaware State Hornets football team =

American college football season

1960 Delaware State Hornets football
- Conference: Central Intercollegiate Athletic Association
- Record: 4–4 (4–3 CIAA)
- Head coach: Roy D. Moore (1st season)
- Home stadium: Alumni Stadium

1960 Central Intercollegiate Athletic Association football standings
	Conf.					Overall
Team	W		L		T	W		L		T
Maryland State $	5	–	0	–	1	5	–	1	–	1
North Carolina A&T	4	–	1	–	1	5	–	3	–	1
North Carolina College	5	–	2	–	0	7	–	2	–	0
Winston-Salem State	5	–	1	–	0	6	–	2	–	0
Hampton	5	–	2	–	0	5	–	4	–	0
Virginia State	5	–	3	–	0	6	–	3	–	0
Johnson C. Smith	6	–	2	–	0	6	–	3	–	0
Morgan State	3	–	3	–	1	3	–	3	–	1
Delaware State	4	–	3	–	0	4	–	4	–	0
Virginia Union	3	–	4	–	1	4	–	5	–	1
St. Augustine's	4	–	4	–	0	4	–	5	–	0
Fayetteville State	2	–	4	–	0	3	–	5	–	0
Howard	2	–	4	–	0	4	–	4	–	0
Shaw	3	–	5	–	0	3	–	6	–	0
Saint Paul's (VA)	1	–	6	–	0	1	–	7	–	0
Elizabeth City State	1	–	7	–	0	1	–	7	–	0
Lincoln (PA)	0	–	6	–	0	0	–	7	–	0
$ – Conference champion

The 1960 Delaware State Hornets football team represented Delaware State College—now known as Delaware State University—as a member of the Central Intercollegiate Athletic Association (CIAA) in the 1960 college football season. Led by coach Roy D. Moore in his first season, the Hornets compiled a 4–4 record, outscoring their opponents 134 to 80.

== Schedule ==
Date	Opponent	Site	Result	Attendance	Source
October 1	Hampton	Alumni Stadium; Dover, DE	L 8–13		
October 8	at Howard	Washington, DC	W 24–6		
October 15	Johnson C. Smith	Alumni Stadium; Dover, DE	L 0–22		
October 22	at Lincoln (PA)	Lincoln, PA	W 38–0 (Note: College Football Data Warehouse lists a 38–7 score.)		
October 29	Saint Paul's (VA)	Alumni Stadium; Dover, DE	W 34–6		
November 5	at Maryland State	Princess Anne, MD	L 6–13	2,500	
November 12	King's (PA)*	Alumni Stadium; Dover, DE	L 12–14		
November 19	St. Augustine's	Raleigh, NC	W 12–6		
*Non-conference game
