= 1963 Grambling Tigers football team =

American college football season

1963 Grambling Tigers football
- Conference: Southwestern Athletic Conference
- Record: 5–3–1 (3–3–1 SWAC)
- Head coach: Eddie Robinson (21st season)
- Home stadium: Grambling Stadium

1963 Southwestern Athletic Conference football standings
	Conf.					Overall
Team	W		L		T	W		L		T
No. 5 Prairie View A&M $^	7	–	0	–	0	10	–	1	–	0
Southern	5	–	2	–	0	7	–	3	–	0
Texas Southern	5	–	2	–	0	7	–	3	–	0
Grambling	3	–	3	–	1	5	–	3	–	1
Arkansas AM&N	3	–	3	–	1	5	–	4	–	1
Jackson State	2	–	5	–	0	4	–	5	–	0
Wiley	2	–	5	–	0	4	–	5	–	0
Alcorn A&M	0	–	7	–	0	3	–	7	–	0
$ – Conference champion; ^ – NAIA playoff participant; Rankings from NAIA poll

The 1963 Grambling Tigers football team represented Grambling College (now known as Grambling State University) as a member of the Southwestern Athletic Conference (SWAC) during the 1963 NCAA College Division football season. Led by 21st-year head coach Eddie Robinson, the Tigers compiled an overall record of 5–3–1 and a mark of 3–3–1 in conference play, and finished tied for fourth in the SWAC.

== Schedule ==
Date	Opponent	Site	Result	Attendance	Source
September 21	at Alcorn A&M	Henderson Stadium; Lorman, MS	W 40–23		
September 28	Southern	Grambling Stadium; Grambling, LA (rivalry)	L 21–22		
October 5	at Tennessee A&I*	Hale Stadium; Nashville, TN	W 26–14		
October 12	Mississippi Vocational*	Grambling Stadium; Grambling, LA	W 39–6		
October 19	Prairie View A&M	Grambling Stadium; Grambling, LA (rivalry)	L 7–28		
October 26	at Jackson State	Alumni Stadium; Jackson, MS	W 62–16		
November 2	Texas Southern	Grambling Stadium; Grambling, LA	L 13–27	5,300	
November 9	at Arkansas AM&N	Pumphrey Stadium; Pine Bluff, AR	T 7–7		
November 16	Wiley	Grambling Stadium; Grambling, LA	W 34–8		
*Non-conference game
