= 1963 Wiley Wildcats football team =

American college football season

1963 Wiley Wildcats football
- Conference: Southwestern Athletic Conference
- Record: 4–5 (2–5 SWAC)
- Head coach: Fred T. Long (33rd season)
- Home stadium: Wildcat Stadium

1963 Southwestern Athletic Conference football standings
| | Conf. | | | | | Overall |
| Team | W | | L | | T | W | | L | | T |
|---|---|---|---|---|---|---|---|---|---|---|
| No. 5 Prairie View A&M $^ | 7 | – | 0 | – | 0 | 10 | – | 1 | – | 0 |
| Southern | 5 | – | 2 | – | 0 | 7 | – | 3 | – | 0 |
| Texas Southern | 5 | – | 2 | – | 0 | 7 | – | 3 | – | 0 |
| Grambling | 3 | – | 3 | – | 1 | 5 | – | 3 | – | 1 |
| Arkansas AM&N | 3 | – | 3 | – | 1 | 5 | – | 4 | – | 1 |
| Jackson State | 2 | – | 5 | – | 0 | 4 | – | 5 | – | 0 |
| Wiley | 2 | – | 5 | – | 0 | 4 | – | 5 | – | 0 |
| Alcorn A&M | 0 | – | 7 | – | 0 | 3 | – | 7 | – | 0 |
$ – Conference champion; ^ – NAIA playoff participant; Rankings from NAIA poll

The 1963 Wiley Wildcats football team represented Wiley College as a member of the Southwestern Athletic Conference (SWAC) during the 1963 NCAA College Division football season. Led by 33rd-year head coach Fred T. Long, the Wildcats compiled an overall record of 4–5, with a conference record of 2–5, and finished tied for sixth in the SWAC.

== Schedule ==
| Date | Opponent | Site | Result | Attendance | Source |
|---|---|---|---|---|---|
| September 28 | Alcorn A&M | Wildcat Stadium; Marshall, TX | W 10–7 | | |
| October 5 | Bishop* | Wildcat Stadium; Marshall, TX | W 27–20 | | |
| October 14 | vs. Prairie View A&M | Cotton Bowl; Dallas, TX (State Fair Classic) | L 10–27 | | |
| October 19 | at Arkansas AM&N | Pumphrey Stadium; Pine Bluff, AR | L 13–14 | | |
| October 26 | Texas Southern | Wildcat Stadium; Marshall, TX | L 13–34 | 3,000 | |
| November 2 | at Jackson State | Alumni Field; Jackson, MS | L 12–34 | | |
| November 9 | Southern^{†} | Wildcat Stadium; Marshall, TX | W 16–13 | | |
| November 16 | at Grambling | Grambling Stadium; Grambling, LA | L 8–34 | | |
| November 28 | at Dillard* | Alumni Stadium; New Orleans, LA (Thanksgiving Day Classic) | W 13–12 | | |
*Non-conference game; ^{†}Homecoming
