= 1963 Jackson State Tigers football team =

American college football season

1963 Jackson State Tigers football
- Conference: Southwestern Athletic Conference
- Record: 4–5 (2–5 SWAC)
- Head coach: Edward Clemons (1st season)
- Home stadium: Alumni Field

1963 Southwestern Athletic Conference football standings
	Conf.					Overall
Team	W		L		T	W		L		T
No. 5 Prairie View A&M $^	7	–	0	–	0	10	–	1	–	0
Southern	5	–	2	–	0	7	–	3	–	0
Texas Southern	5	–	2	–	0	7	–	3	–	0
Grambling	3	–	3	–	1	5	–	3	–	1
Arkansas AM&N	3	–	3	–	1	5	–	4	–	1
Jackson State	2	–	5	–	0	4	–	5	–	0
Wiley	2	–	5	–	0	4	–	5	–	0
Alcorn A&M	0	–	7	–	0	3	–	7	–	0
$ – Conference champion; ^ – NAIA playoff participant; Rankings from NAIA poll

The 1963 Jackson State Tigers football team represented Jackson College for Negro Teachers (now known as Jackson State University) as a member of the Southwestern Athletic Conference (SWAC) during the 1963 NCAA College Division football season. Led by first-year head coach Edward Clemons, the Tigers compiled an overall record of 4–5, with a conference record of 2–5, and finished tied for sixth in the SWAC.

== Schedule ==
Date	Opponent	Site	Result	Attendance	Source
September 21	at Prairie View A&M	Blackshear Field; Prairie View, TX	L 12–28		
September 28	at Mississippi Vocational*	Magnolia Stadium; Itta Bena, MS	W 18–13		
October 5	at Arkansas AM&N	Pumphrey Stadium; Pine Bluff, AR	L 6–20	2,200	
October 12	Alcorn A&M	Alumni Field; Jackson, MS (rivalry)	W 22–13		
October 19	Southern	Alumni Field; Jackson, MS (rivalry)	L 16–17		
October 26	Grambling	Alumni Field; Jackson, MS	L 16–62		
November 2	Wiley	Alumni Field; Jackson, MS	W 34–12		
November 9	at Texas Southern	Jeppesen Stadium; Houston, TX	L 0–6	8,400	
November 16	Mississippi Industrial*	Alumni Field; Jackson, MS	W 56–6		
*Non-conference game
