= 1962 Delaware State Hornets football team =

American college football season

1962 Delaware State Hornets football
- Conference: Central Intercollegiate Athletic Association
- Record: 4–5 (3–4 CIAA)
- Head coach: Roy D. Moore (3rd season)
- Home stadium: Alumni Stadium

1962 Central Intercollegiate Athletic Association football standings
	Conf.					Overall
Team	W		L		T	W		L		T
Morgan State $	8	–	1	–	0	8	–	2	–	0
North Carolina A&T	6	–	1	–	0	7	–	3	–	0
Johnson C. Smith	6	–	1	–	0	7	–	2	–	0
Virginia Union	7	–	2	–	0	7	–	2	–	0
Maryland State	2	–	2	–	1	4	–	2	–	1
North Carolina College	4	–	3	–	0	6	–	3	–	0
Fayetteville State	4	–	2	–	1	4	–	2	–	1
Elizabeth City State	2	–	3	–	3	2	–	3	–	3
Norfolk State	3	–	3	–	0	5	–	3	–	0
Virginia State	3	–	5	–	0	4	–	5	–	0
St. Augustine's	3	–	4	–	1	4	–	4	–	1
Delaware State	3	–	4	–	0	4	–	5	–	0
Winston-Salem State	2	–	5	–	0	3	–	6	–	0
Hampton	3	–	4	–	0	3	–	6	–	0
Livingstone	1	–	3	–	0	2	–	8	–	0
Saint Paul's (VA)	2	–	6	–	0	2	–	6	–	0
Shaw	1	–	7	–	1	1	–	7	–	1
Howard	0	–	6	–	0	1	–	8	–	0
$ – Conference champion

The 1962 Delaware State Hornets football team represented Delaware State College—now known as Delaware State University—as a member of the Central Intercollegiate Athletic Association (CIAA) in the 1962 NCAA College Division football season. Led by coach Roy D. Moore in his third season, the Hornets compiled a 4–5 record, 3–4 in their conference.

== Schedule ==
Date	Opponent	Site	Result	Attendance	Source
September 22	Slippery Rock*	Alumni Stadium; Dover, DE	L 12–21		
September 29	Hampton	Alumni Stadium; Dover, DE	W 12–9		
October 6	at Howard	Washington, DC	W 20–0		
October 13	Johnson C. Smith	Alumni Stadium; Dover, DE	L 12–29		
October 20	at Morgan State	Hughes Stadium; Baltimore, MD	L 0–34	2,000	
October 27	King's (PA)*	Alumni Stadium; Dover, DE	W 16–8		
November 3	at Maryland State	Princess Anne, MD	L 0–19		
November 10	Saint Paul's (VA)	Alumni Stadium; Dover, DE	W 34–14		
November 17	at St. Augustine's	Raleigh, NC	L 6–18		
*Non-conference game
