= 1961 Delaware State Hornets football team =

American college football season

1961 Delaware State Hornets football
- Conference: Central Intercollegiate Athletic Association
- Record: 6–3 (5–2 CIAA)
- Head coach: Roy D. Moore (2nd season)
- Home stadium: Alumni Stadium

1961 Central Intercollegiate Athletic Association football standings
	Conf.					Overall
Team	W		L		T	W		L		T
North Carolina College $	5	–	0	–	2	7	–	0	–	2
North Carolina A&T	5	–	1	–	0	5	–	4	–	0
Johnson C. Smith	6	–	1	–	0	8	–	1	–	0
Winston-Salem State	5	–	1	–	1	6	–	1	–	1
Maryland State	2	–	2	–	1	4	–	2	–	1
Delaware State	5	–	2	–	0	7	–	3	–	0
Virginia Union	4	–	3	–	1	5	–	3	–	1
Morgan State	5	–	4	–	0	5	–	4	–	0
Virginia State	3	–	4	–	1	3	–	4	–	1
Hampton	3	–	3	–	0	6	–	3	–	0
Elizabeth City State	3	–	4	–	0	4	–	4	–	0
St. Augustine's	3	–	5	–	0	4	–	5	–	0
Fayetteville State	2	–	4	–	0	3	–	6	–	0
Howard	1	–	5	–	0	1	–	8	–	0
Shaw	1	–	8	–	0	1	–	8	–	0
Saint Paul's (VA)	0	–	6	–	0	0	–	8	–	0
$ – Conference champion

The 1961 Delaware State Hornets football team represented Delaware State College—now known as Delaware State University—as a member of the Central Intercollegiate Athletic Association (CIAA) in the 1961 college football season. Led by coach Roy D. Moore in his second season, the Hornets compiled a 6–3 record, finishing 5–2 in their conference.

== Schedule ==
Date	Opponent	Site	Result	Attendance	Source
September 23	at Slippery Rock*	Slippery Rock, PA	L 7–36 (Note: College Football Data Warehouse lists a 12–21 score.)	3,500	
September 30	at Hampton	Armstrong Stadium; Hampton, VA	W 22–8	6,500	
October 7	Howard	Alumni Stadium; Dover, DE	W 20–0		
October 14	at Johnson C. Smith	Charlotte, NC	L 0–40		
October 21	Morgan State	Alumni Stadium; Dover, DE	W 6–3		
October 28	at Saint Paul's (VA)	Lawrenceville, VA	W 24–12 (Note: College Football Data Warehouse lists a 24–14 score)		
November 4	Maryland State	Alumni Stadium; Dover, DE	L 8–25		
November 11	at King's (PA)*	Wilkes-Barre, PA	W 63–0 (Note: College Football Data Warehouse lists a 36–0 score)		
November 18	St. Augustine's	Alumni Stadium; Dover, DE	W 16–6		
*Non-conference game
