= 1963 Texas Southern Tigers football team =

American college football season

1963 Texas Southern Tigers football
- Conference: Southwestern Athletic Conference
- Record: 7–3 (5–2 SWAC)
- Head coach: Alexander Durley (15th season)
- Home stadium: Jeppesen Stadium

1963 Southwestern Athletic Conference football standings
	Conf.					Overall
Team	W		L		T	W		L		T
No. 5 Prairie View A&M $^	7	–	0	–	0	10	–	1	–	0
Southern	5	–	2	–	0	7	–	3	–	0
Texas Southern	5	–	2	–	0	7	–	3	–	0
Grambling	3	–	3	–	1	5	–	3	–	1
Arkansas AM&N	3	–	3	–	1	5	–	4	–	1
Jackson State	2	–	5	–	0	4	–	5	–	0
Wiley	2	–	5	–	0	4	–	5	–	0
Alcorn A&M	0	–	7	–	0	3	–	7	–	0
$ – Conference champion; ^ – NAIA playoff participant; Rankings from NAIA poll

The 1963 Texas Southern Tigers football team was an American football team that represented Texas Southern University as a member of the Southwestern Athletic Conference (SWAC) during the 1963 NCAA College Division football season. Led by 15th-year head coach Alexander Durley, the Tigers compiled an overall record of 7–3, with a mark of 5–2 in conference play, and finished tied for second in the SWAC.

== Schedule ==
Date	Opponent	Site	Result	Attendance	Source
September 21	at Southern	University Stadium; Baton Rouge, LA	L 6–14	15,000	
October 5	Prairie View A&M	Jeppesen Stadium; Houston, TX (rivalry)	L 6–44	14,000–26,000	
October 12	at Bishop*	Dallas, TX	W 33–6	3,200	
October 19	Alcorn A&M	Jeppesen Stadium; Houston, TX	W 38–22	5,000–5,400	
October 26	at Wiley	Wildcat Stadium; Marshall, TX	W 34–13	3,000	
November 2	at Grambling	Grambling Stadium; Grambling, LA	W 27–13	5,300	
November 9	Jackson State	Jeppesen Stadium; Houston, TX	W 6–0	8,400	
November 16	Arkansas AM&N	Jeppesen Stadium; Houston, TX	W 6–0	5,000	
November 22	at Lackland Air Force Base*	Lackland Stadium; San Antonio, TX	L 21–33	4,000	
November 30	vs. No. 7 Florida A&M*	Gator Bowl Stadium; Jacksonville, FL	W 20–14	21,000	
*Non-conference game; Rankings from AP Poll released prior to the game
