= North Carolina A&T–North Carolina Central rivalry =

American college football rivalry

- North Carolina A&T Aggies North Carolina Central Eagles
- Sport: Football
- First meeting: November 23, 1922; North Carolina A&T 26, National Training School 0
- Latest meeting: September 12, 2026; North Carolina Central 30, North Carolina A&T 22
- Next meeting: August 28, 2027

Statistics
- Total meetings: 98
- All-time series: North Carolina A&T leads, 54–39–5
- Largest victory: North Carolina A&T, 54–0 (2019)
- Longest win streak: North Carolina A&T, 12 (1989–2001)
- Current win streak: North Carolina Central, 5 (2022–present)

Locations of North Carolina A&T and North Carolina Central

The North Carolina A&T–North Carolina Central rivalry is an ongoing series of athletic competitions between North Carolina Agricultural and Technical State University and North Carolina Central University, both of which are located in North Carolina.

The intensity of the rivalry is driven by the proximity of the two schools, as both are only 55 miles apart via U.S. Interstate 85, the size of the two schools, as North Carolina A&T is one of the largest Historically Black College and University in the nation and North Carolina Central is the second largest in the state, and the fact that both schools are competing for many of the same students and athletes. Fans of both Universities tend to place great emphasis on this rivalry.

== Football ==
The most prominent sport in the rivalry is football. The two teams have been competing against each other since 1922. During the 1920s, North Carolina Central went through several name changes. Its name was the National Training School when the teams first played. The name changed to the Durham State Normal School in 1923 and then to the North Carolina College for Negroes at Durham in 1925. When the series began, Lonnie Pfunander Byarm (1922-1929) and Wilson Vashon Eagleson (1922-1926) were the mentors or head coaches of North Carolina A&T and the National Training School, respectively. The series began in Greensboro with a 26–0 North Carolina A&T victory over the National Training School. Since 1922, the rivalry game has shifted from North Carolina Central and North Carolina A&T's respective campuses. The teams did not play in the following years: 1923, 1926, 1929, 1943, 1944, 1993, and 2006.

Under the leadership of coach Byarm, in the 1920s, the Aggies went undefeated against North Carolina Central and tied once in 1924, the best season for coach Eagleson. At the close of the 1920s, North Carolina A&T held a 4–0–1 record over their Durham rivals. In 1930, Harry "Big Jeff" Jefferson (1930-1931), former head coach of Bluefield State, took the reins at North Carolina A&T, and Leo Townsend (1930-1935) became head coach at North Carolina College. Townsend intensified the rivalry in the 1930s by defeating the Aggies for the first time in 1930. The Eagles then shut out North Carolina A&T between 1931-1933. North Carolina A&T let Jefferson go at the end of 1931 and hired Inman Breaux (1932–1935; 1937–1938). The Eagles won their first two against Breaux, and at the end of the 1933 season, the series stood at 4 wins, 4 losses, and 1 tie. Breaux got the Aggies back on top of the rivalry in 1934, and the Aggies did not lose again to the Eagles until 1941 when the Eagles fielded their best team in school history at that time.

In this early period, both teams won games on the field only to have an ineligible player rob them of the victory. In 1935, Calvin Hall and Harry Lash played for North Carolina A&T without informing Aggie coaches that they had played for another school a year earlier. After this rules violation was discovered, the CIAA ruled in February 1936 that both players were ineligible and that all the games in which they played were forfeited. Lash started against North Carolina College, which forfeited the Aggies' 1935 victory. In 1941, the head coach at Johnson C. Smith let the CIAA know that North Carolina College player Henry "Big Dog" Thomas had played for another HBCU in 1934 and had not sat out the required one year before playing for the Eagles. Thomas had registered at North Carolina College as a freshman and told his coaches he had not played previously. After a CIAA investigation, Thomas was ruled ineligible, and North Carolina College forfeited all of the games in which he played, including a tightly contested and hard-fought victory over North Carolina A&T.

A fight during the 1950s compelled the game to be moved to Wallace Wade Stadium on the campus of Duke University. It was at Wallace Wade, that a man drove his car onto the field during the game and parked at the 50-yard line. The series record stands right now with the Aggies of North Carolina A&T leading with a record of 54–39–5.

=== Rise of the Classic ===
North Carolina A&T won the first Aggie-Eagle Classic game in 1994, 38–9. North Carolina A&T held a 10–2 edge in the meetings since the intrastate rivalry moved from a home-and-home scenario to an annual neutral site game in Carter-Finley Stadium in 1994. North Carolina Central would not earn their first win of the series until 2002, with a 33–30 overtime win. There are three instances in the series in which the losing team was unable to score: The first was in 2001 when the Aggies of North Carolina A&T won with a 22–0 victory, the second was in a 25–0 2003 win in which the Aggies went on to become the Mid-Eastern Athletic Conference champions and 45-0 Aggie win in 2018.

The games with the closest margins of victory happened in 2004 and 2005. In 2004, the Aggies, who were on the verge of a 15–13 upset by the Eagles, recovered a failed exchange with a little over a minute left. The Aggies progressed down the field and kicked a 50-yard field goal as time expired to win the game. The following year, the Eagles of North Carolina Central returned the favor by defeating the Aggies 23–22 in the final edition of the classic. The Aggies beat Central 22–16 in their game on November 14, 2012.

=== The Fall of The Classic ===
The series came to an end when the contract with the city of Raleigh was not renewed. This was caused in part to the Capital Area Sports Foundation, which guaranteed each school $150,000 for the 2005 game. failing to deliver on financial guarantees to both schools. In its tax return for that year, the foundation reported more than $160,000 in payouts to North Carolina A&T, but the university said it has received less than $100,000 and didn't expect to see anything more. As a result of the collapse of the classic, The North Carolina A&T – North Carolina Central Rivalry was put on hold for the 2006 football season.

=== Rivalry renewed ===
Since the ending of the classic, the annual games between the rivals have once again returned to the respective campuses of the two universities. The 2007 game marked the first time in years that these two universities met for a football game on a non-neutral site. The Eagles defeated the Aggies 22–27 on the Aggies' home field. Following the game, controversy erupted as a player from NCCU stomped on the NC A&T logo in the middle of Aggie Stadium. This celebratory action led to a fight between players from both schools.

In order to accommodate an anticipated crowd that exceeds the capacity of its own stadium, North Carolina Central University moved its 2008 home football game to the neutral Memorial Stadium in Charlotte, N.C. This meeting again spelled victory for the Eagles as they once again won 28–27.

On September 10, 2009, the Mid-Eastern Athletic Conference announced that North Carolina Central University would rejoin the conference as its 13th member, effective July 1, 2010. With North Carolina Central's shift from an NCAA Division I independent school to a member of the Mid-Eastern Athletic Conference, the storied rivalry between the two institutions would now have conference ramifications. In the 2009 meeting, the Aggies prevailed in a 23–17 double overtime win in front of 19,534 spectators at Aggie Stadium in Greensboro, NC.

=== A&T's move to the Big South Conference ===
On February 2, 2020, the Big South Conference announced that North Carolina A&T would join the conference, effective July 1, 2021. The future of the rivalry was put in doubt.

On December 17, 2020, both schools announced that the rivalry will continue over the next 10 seasons, beginning September 25, 2021, in Greensboro.

On May 25, 2021, the Charlotte Sports Foundation (CSF) announced that the two schools will play in the Duke's Mayo Classic to open the 2022 and 2027 seasons.

== Game results ==
North Carolina A&T victories	North Carolina Central victories	Tie games

No.	Date	Location	Winner	Score
1	November 23, 1922	Greensboro, NC	North Carolina A&T	26–0
2	November 22, 1924	Durham, NC	Tie	13–13
3	October 24, 1925	Greensboro, NC	North Carolina A&T	19–0
4	October 22, 1927	Greensboro, NC	North Carolina A&T	28–13
5	October 13, 1928	Winston-Salem, NC	North Carolina A&T	20–0
6	November 1, 1930	Durham, NC	North Carolina Central	20–14
7	October 31, 1931	Durham, NC	North Carolina Central	6–0
8	November 24, 1932	Greensboro, NC	North Carolina Central	19–0
9	November 30, 1933	Durham, NC	North Carolina Central	20–0
10	November 29, 1934	Greensboro, NC	North Carolina A&T	6–0
11	November 30, 1935	Durham, NC	North Carolina A&T	9–0†
12	November 26, 1936	Greensboro, NC	North Carolina A&T	39–0
13	November 25, 1937	Durham, NC	North Carolina A&T	14–7
14	November 24, 1938	Greensboro, NC	North Carolina A&T	25–0
15	November 30, 1939	Durham, NC	North Carolina A&T	7–0
16	November 28, 1940	Greensboro, NC	North Carolina A&T	12–6
17	November 22, 1941	Durham, NC	North Carolina Central	9–6††
18	November 26, 1942	Greensboro, NC	North Carolina Central	16–12
19	October 20, 1945	Durham, NC	North Carolina Central	40–0
20	October 19, 1946	Greensboro, NC	North Carolina A&T	17–0
21	December 6, 1947	Durham, NC	North Carolina Central	17–0
22	December 4, 1948	Greensboro, NC	Tie	6–6
23	November 24, 1949	Greensboro, NC	North Carolina A&T	33–6
24	November 23, 1950	Durham, NC	North Carolina A&T	25–13
25	November 22, 1951	Greensboro, NC	North Carolina A&T	13–6
26	November 27, 1952	Durham, NC	North Carolina A&T	26–0
27	November 26, 1953	Greensboro, NC	North Carolina Central	15–6
28	November 25, 1954	Durham, NC	North Carolina Central	7–6
29	November 24, 1955	Greensboro, NC	Tie	7–7
30	November 22, 1956	Durham, NC	North Carolina Central	20–0
31	November 28, 1957	Greensboro, NC	North Carolina A&T	21–0
32	November 27, 1958	Durham, NC	North Carolina A&T	20–18
33	November 26, 1959	Greensboro, NC	North Carolina A&T	3–0
34	November 24, 1960	Greensboro, NC	North Carolina Central	14–13
35	November 23, 1961	Durham, NC	North Carolina Central	13–0
36	November 17, 1962	Durham, NC	North Carolina A&T	28–7
37	November 28, 1963	Greensboro, NC	North Carolina Central	6–0
38	November 26, 1964	Durham, NC	North Carolina A&T	46–0
39	November 25, 1965	Greensboro, NC	North Carolina Central	7–6
40	November 24, 1966	Durham, NC	North Carolina Central	12–6
41	November 23, 1967	Greensboro, NC	North Carolina A&T	19–6
42	November 27, 1968	Durham, NC	North Carolina A&T	21–6
43	November 22, 1969	Greensboro, NC	Tie	28–28
44	November 21, 1970	Durham, NC	North Carolina Central	13–7
45	November 20, 1971	Greensboro, NC	North Carolina Central	14–13
46	November 18, 1972	Durham, NC	North Carolina Central	9–7
47	November 17, 1973	Greensboro, NC	North Carolina Central	16–6
48	November 23, 1974	Durham, NC	North Carolina Central	29–18
49	November 22, 1975	Greensboro, NC	North Carolina A&T	34–16
50	November 20, 1976	Durham, NC	North Carolina Central	17–16

No.	Date	Location	Winner	Score
51	November 19, 1977	Greensboro, NC	North Carolina A&T	25–6
52	November 18, 1978	Durham, NC	North Carolina A&T	17–13
53	November 17, 1979	Greensboro, NC	North Carolina A&T	23–20
54	November 22, 1980	Durham, NC	North Carolina A&T	49–13
55	December 13, 1980	Richmond, VA	North Carolina A&T	37–0
56	November 28, 1981	Greensboro, NC	North Carolina Central	35–7
57	November 13, 1982	Durham, NC	North Carolina A&T	13–7
58	November 12, 1983	Greensboro, NC	Tie	13–13
59	November 10, 1984	Durham, NC	North Carolina Central	49–10
60	November 16, 1985	Greensboro, NC	North Carolina A&T	28–19
61	November 15, 1986	Durham, NC	North Carolina A&T	35–12
62	November 14, 1987	Greensboro, NC	North Carolina Central	38–19
63	September 3, 1988	Durham, NC	North Carolina Central	15–2
64	September 2, 1989	Greensboro, NC	North Carolina A&T	24–6
65	September 1, 1990	Charlotte, NC	North Carolina A&T	21–6
66	September 7, 1991	Greensboro, NC	North Carolina A&T	48–0
67	September 5, 1992	Greensboro, NC	North Carolina A&T	49–7
68	September 3, 1994	Raleigh, NC	North Carolina A&T	38–9
69	September 3, 1995	Raleigh, NC	North Carolina A&T	18–17
70	August 31, 1996	Raleigh, NC	North Carolina A&T	38–31^{OT}
71	August 30, 1997	Raleigh, NC	North Carolina A&T	36–7
72	September 5, 1998	Raleigh, NC	North Carolina A&T	40–10
73	September 5, 1999	Raleigh, NC	North Carolina A&T	20–7
74	September 3, 2000	Raleigh, NC	North Carolina A&T	40–7
75	September 1, 2001	Raleigh, NC	North Carolina A&T	22–0
76	September 1, 2002	Raleigh, NC	North Carolina Central	33–30^{OT}
77	August 31, 2003	Raleigh, NC	North Carolina A&T	25–0
78	September 5, 2004	Raleigh, NC	North Carolina A&T	16–15
79	September 5, 2005	Raleigh, NC	North Carolina Central	23–22
80	September 22, 2007	Greensboro, NC	North Carolina Central	27–22
81	October 4, 2008	Charlotte, NC	North Carolina Central	28–27
82	October 3, 2009	Greensboro, NC	North Carolina A&T	23–17^{2OT}
83	September 25, 2010	Durham, NC	North Carolina Central	27–16
84	November 19, 2011	Greensboro, NC	North Carolina A&T	31–21
85	November 18, 2012	Durham, NC	North Carolina A&T	22–16^{OT}
86	November 23, 2013	Greensboro, NC	North Carolina A&T	28–0
87	November 22, 2014	Durham, NC	North Carolina Central	21–14
88	November 21, 2015	Greensboro, NC	North Carolina Central	21–16
89	November 19, 2016	Durham, NC	North Carolina Central	42–21
90	November 18, 2017	Greensboro, NC	North Carolina A&T	24–10
91	November 17, 2018	Durham, NC	North Carolina A&T	45–0
92	November 23, 2019	Greensboro, NC	North Carolina A&T	54–0
93	September 25, 2021	Greensboro, NC	North Carolina A&T	37–14
94	September 4, 2022	Charlotte, NC	North Carolina Central	28–13
95	September 9, 2023	Greensboro, NC	North Carolina Central	30–16
96	September 21, 2024	Durham, NC	North Carolina Central	66–24
97	September 20, 2025	Greensboro, NC	North Carolina Central	62–20
98	September 12, 2026	Durham, NC	North Carolina Central	30–22
Series: North Carolina A&T leads 54–39–5

† In 1935, the CIAA ruled Calvin Hall and Harry Lash were ineligible and NCAT forfeited all conference games in which they participated.
†† All 1941 NCCU conference games were forfeited after the CIAA conference ruled that player Henry "Big Dog" Thomas was ineligible.
± The 2010 game set an attendance record in O'Kelly Riddick Stadium with 15,173 in attendance.
° Games played during the Aggie-Eagle Classic

== See also ==
- List of NCAA college football rivalry games
