= 1963 Delaware State Hornets football team =

American college football season

1963 Delaware State Hornets football
- Conference: Central Intercollegiate Athletic Association
- Record: 2–5–1 (1–5 CIAA)
- Head coach: Roy D. Moore (4th season)
- Home stadium: Alumni Stadium

1963 Central Intercollegiate Athletic Association football standings
	Conf.					Overall
Team	W		L		T	W		L		T
No. 17 North Carolina College $	6	–	1	–	0	8	–	1	–	0
No. 14 Morgan State	8	–	1	–	0	8	–	1	–	0
North Carolina A&T	5	–	2	–	0	7	–	3	–	0
Johnson C. Smith	5	–	1	–	0	7	–	2	–	0
Virginia Union	7	–	2	–	0	7	–	2	–	0
St. Augustine's	4	–	2	–	1	4	–	3	–	1
Virginia State	4	–	4	–	0	4	–	4	–	1
Saint Paul's (VA)	4	–	3	–	0	4	–	3	–	1
Winston-Salem State	3	–	3	–	1	4	–	3	–	1
Norfolk State	4	–	3	–	0	4	–	4	–	0
Maryland State	3	–	4	–	0	4	–	4	–	0
Elizabeth City State	3	–	5	–	0	3	–	5	–	0
Hampton	2	–	5	–	0	4	–	5	–	0
Shaw	2	–	6	–	0	2	–	8	–	0
Howard	1	–	4	–	0	4	–	5	–	0
Fayetteville State	1	–	5	–	0	1	–	7	–	0
Delaware State	1	–	5	–	0	2	–	5	–	1
Livingstone	0	–	7	–	0	0	–	7	–	0
$ – Conference champion; Rankings from NAIA poll

The 1963 Delaware State Hornets football team represented Delaware State College—now known as Delaware State University—as a member of the Central Intercollegiate Athletic Association (CIAA) in the 1963 NCAA College Division football season. Led by coach Roy D. Moore in his fourth season, the Hornets compiled a 2–5–1 record, 1–5 in their conference. The final game of the season, against St. Augustine's, was canceled following the assassination of John F. Kennedy.

== Schedule ==
Date	Opponent	Site	Result	Attendance	Source
September 21	at Slippery Rock*	Slippery Rock, PA	T 19–19		
October 5	at Hampton	Armstrong Stadium; Hampton, VA	L 6–25	5,000	
October 12	Howard	Alumni Stadium; Dover, DE	W 30–0		
October 19	at Johnson C. Smith	Charlotte, NC	L 0–43		
October 26	Morgan State	Alumni Stadium; Dover, DE	L 14–46	4,000	
November 2	at Montclair State*	Upper Montclair, NJ	W 20–12		
November 9	Maryland State	Alumni Stadium; Dover, DE	L 0–37	3,500	
November 16	at Saint Paul's (VA)	Lawrenceville, VA	L 14–22		
November 23	St. Augustine's	Alumni Stadium; Dover, DE	Cancelled		
*Non-conference game
