= 1965 Drake Bulldogs football team =

American college football season

1965 Drake Bulldogs football
- Conference: Independent
- Record: 6–4
- Head coach: Jack Wallace (1st season)
- Home stadium: Drake Stadium

1965 NCAA College Division independents football records
	Conf.			Overall
Team	W	L	T	W		L		T
Springfield		–		9	–	0	–	0
Ithaca		–		8	–	0	–	0
Parsons		–		8	–	1	–	0
Santa Clara		–		8	–	1	–	0
UC Santa Barbara		–		8	–	2	–	0
Cortland		–		7	–	2	–	0
Wabash		–		7	–	2	–	0
Northeastern		–		6	–	2	–	0
UC Riverside		–		6	–	2	–	0
Tampa		–		6	–	2	–	1
Northern Michigan		–		7	–	3	–	0
Mississippi Valley State		–		6	–	3	–	0
St. Norbert		–		6	–	3	–	0
Rose Poly		–		5	–	3	–	0
Drake		–		6	–	4	–	0
Chattanooga		–		5	–	4	–	1
Arizona State–Flagstaff		–		5	–	4	–	1
Lake Forest		–		4	–	4	–	0
Cal Poly Pomona		–		4	–	5	–	0
Howard (AL)		–		4	–	6	–	0
Portland State		–		4	–	6	–	0
Colorado College		–		3	–	5	–	0
Milwaukee		–		2	–	6	–	0
Southern Illinois		–		2	–	8	–	0
Pacific (CA)		–		2	–	8	–	0
Hawaii		–		1	–	8	–	1
Carnegie Tech		–		1	–	7	–	0
Wheaton (IL)		–		1	–	8	–	0

The 1965 Drake Bulldogs football team was an American football team that represented Drake University as an independent during the 1965 NCAA College Division football season. In its first season under head coach Jack Wallace, the team compiled a 6–4 record and outscored opponents by a total of 212 to 165.

The team's statistical leaders included junior quarterback Ron Royer (1,161 passing yards, 1,358 yards of total offense), sophomore fullback Ray Brown (805 rushing yards, 68 points scored), and junior end and placekicker Manley Sarnowsky (531 receiving yards, 68 points scored).

The team played its home games at Drake Stadium in Des Moines, Iowa.

== Schedule ==
Date	Opponent	Site	Result	Attendance	Source
September 18	at Iowa State	Clyde Williams Field; Ames, IA	L 0–21	9,500	
September 25	at South Dakota	Inman Field; Vermillion, SD	W 17–0	6,000	
October 2	Southwest Missouri State	Drake Stadium; Des Moines, IA	W 24–8		
October 9	State College of Iowa	Drake Stadium; Des Moines, IA	W 31–7		
October 16	at Southern Illinois	Drake Stadium; Des Moines, IA	W 28–12		
October 23	at Western Kentucky	Bowling Green, KY	L 21–28	10,000	
October 30	at Abilene Christian	Shotwell Stadium; Abilene, TX	W 24–7	3,500	
November 6	at West Texas State	Buffalo Bowl; Canyon, TX	L 14–20	11,000	
November 13	Louisville	Drake Stadium; Des Moines, IA	L 17–32	3,500	
November 20	Omaha	Drake Stadium; Des Moines, IA	W 36–30		
