= 1965 Milwaukee Panthers football team =

American college football season

1965 Milwaukee Panthers football
- Conference: Independent
- Record: 2–6
- Head coach: Wally Dreyer (6th season)
- Home stadium: Shorewood Stadium; Pearse Field

1965 NCAA College Division independents football records
	Conf.			Overall
Team	W	L	T	W		L		T
Springfield		–		9	–	0	–	0
Ithaca		–		8	–	0	–	0
Parsons		–		8	–	1	–	0
Santa Clara		–		8	–	1	–	0
UC Santa Barbara		–		8	–	2	–	0
Cortland		–		7	–	2	–	0
Wabash		–		7	–	2	–	0
Northeastern		–		6	–	2	–	0
UC Riverside		–		6	–	2	–	0
Tampa		–		6	–	2	–	1
Northern Michigan		–		7	–	3	–	0
Mississippi Valley State		–		6	–	3	–	0
St. Norbert		–		6	–	3	–	0
Rose Poly		–		5	–	3	–	0
Drake		–		6	–	4	–	0
Chattanooga		–		5	–	4	–	1
Arizona State–Flagstaff		–		5	–	4	–	1
Lake Forest		–		4	–	4	–	0
Cal Poly Pomona		–		4	–	5	–	0
Howard (AL)		–		4	–	6	–	0
Portland State		–		4	–	6	–	0
Colorado College		–		3	–	5	–	0
Milwaukee		–		2	–	6	–	0
Southern Illinois		–		2	–	8	–	0
Pacific (CA)		–		2	–	8	–	0
Hawaii		–		1	–	8	–	1
Carnegie Tech		–		1	–	7	–	0
Wheaton (IL)		–		1	–	8	–	0

The 1965 Milwaukee Panthers football team represented the University of Wisconsin–Milwaukee as an independent during the 1965 NCAA College Division football season. Led by Wally Dreyer in his sixth season as head coach, Milwaukee compiled a record of 2–6. The Panthers offense scored 185 points while the defense allowed 225 points.

== Schedule ==
Date	Opponent	Site	Result	Attendance	Source
September 10	at North Dakota State	Dacotah Field; Fargo, ND	L 20–59	4,500	
September 20	Carroll (WI)	Shorewood Stadium; Shorewood, WI	L 14–20	3,500	
September 25	at Oshkosh State	Jackson Street Field; Oshkosh, WI	L 13–14		
October 2	Eastern Illinois	Shorewood Stadium; Shorewood, WI	L 28–24	3,500	
October 16	at Wayne State (MI)	Tartar Field; Detroit, MI	W 41–34	1,701	
October 23	Northern Illinois	Shorewood Stadium; Milwaukee, WI	L 12–38	3,000	
October 30	at Chicago Circle	Gately Stadium; Chicago, IL	W 48–7		
November 13	Bradley	Pearse Field; Milwaukee, WI	L 13–25	3,500	
