= 1965 Mississippi Valley State Delta Devils football team =

American college football season

1965 Mississippi Valley State Delta Devils football
- Conference: Independent
- Record: 6–3
- Head coach: Doug Porter (5th season)
- Home stadium: Magnolia Stadium

1965 NCAA College Division independents football records
	Conf.			Overall
Team	W	L	T	W		L		T
Springfield		–		9	–	0	–	0
Ithaca		–		8	–	0	–	0
Parsons		–		8	–	1	–	0
Santa Clara		–		8	–	1	–	0
UC Santa Barbara		–		8	–	2	–	0
Cortland		–		7	–	2	–	0
Wabash		–		7	–	2	–	0
Northeastern		–		6	–	2	–	0
UC Riverside		–		6	–	2	–	0
Tampa		–		6	–	2	–	1
Northern Michigan		–		7	–	3	–	0
Mississippi Valley State		–		6	–	3	–	0
St. Norbert		–		6	–	3	–	0
Rose Poly		–		5	–	3	–	0
Drake		–		6	–	4	–	0
Chattanooga		–		5	–	4	–	1
Arizona State–Flagstaff		–		5	–	4	–	1
Lake Forest		–		4	–	4	–	0
Cal Poly Pomona		–		4	–	5	–	0
Howard (AL)		–		4	–	6	–	0
Portland State		–		4	–	6	–	0
Colorado College		–		3	–	5	–	0
Milwaukee		–		2	–	6	–	0
Southern Illinois		–		2	–	8	–	0
Pacific (CA)		–		2	–	8	–	0
Hawaii		–		1	–	8	–	1
Carnegie Tech		–		1	–	7	–	0
Wheaton (IL)		–		1	–	8	–	0

The 1965 Mississippi Valley State Delta Devils football team represented Mississippi Valley State College (now known as Mississippi Valley State University) as an independent school during the 1965 NCAA College Division football season. Led by fifth-year head coach Doug Porter, the Delta Devils compiled an overall record of 6–3.

== Schedule ==
Date	Opponent	Site	Result	Attendance	Source
September 18	Arkansas AM&N	Magnolia Stadium; Itta Bena, MS	W 19–13		
September 25	at Bishop	Bishop Stadium; Dallas, TX	W 26–6		
October 2	at Alabama State	Hornet Stadium; Montgomery, AL	W 52–7		
October 9	Texas Southern	Magnolia Stadium; Itta Bena, MS	W 7–6		
October 16	at Grambling	Grambling Stadium; Grambling, LA	L 14–30	18,000	
October 23	at Edward Waters	Gator Bowl Stadium; Jacksonville, FL	W 42–19	5,000	
November 6	at Alcorn A&M	Henderson Stadium; Lorman, MS	L 14–15		
November 13	Savannah State	Magnolia Stadium; Itta Bena, MS	W 67–2		
November 20	Jackson State	Magnolia Stadium; Itta Bena, MS	L 14–18	5,176	
