= 1965 Valley State Matadors football team =

American college football season

1965 Valley State Matadors football
- Conference: California Collegiate Athletic Association
- Record: 1–9 (0–4 CCAA)
- Head coach: Sam Winningham (4th season)
- Home stadium: Monroe High School

1965 California Collegiate Athletic Association football standings
	Conf.					Overall
Team	W		L		T	W		L		T
No. 4/2 Cal St Los Angeles $	5	–	0	–	0	9	–	1	–	0
No. NR/9 Long Beach State	4	–	1	–	0	9	–	1	–	0
San Diego State	3	–	2	–	0	8	–	2	–	0
Fresno State	1	–	3	–	0	6	–	4	–	0
Cal Poly	1	–	4	–	0	2	–	8	–	0
Valley State	0	–	4	–	0	1	–	9	–	0
$ – Conference champion; Rankings from AP/UPI small college polls

The 1965 Valley State Matadors football team represented San Fernando Valley State College—now known as California State University, Northridge—as a member of the California Collegiate Athletic Association (CCAA) during the 1965 NCAA College Division football season. Led by fourth-year head coach Sam Winningham, Valley State compiled an overall record of 1–9 with a mark of 0–4 in conference play, placing last out of six teams in the CCAA. The Matadors played home games at Monroe High School in Sepulveda, California.

== Schedule ==
Date	Opponent	Site	Result	Attendance	Source
September 18	UC Santa Barbara*	Monroe High School; Sepulveda, CA	L 0–20	7,800–8,000	
September 25	Occidental*	Monroe High School; Sepulveda, CA	L 12–25	2,400	
October 2	at San Francisco State*	Cox Stadium; San Francisco, CA	L 0–27	1,000	
October 9	Cal Poly	Monroe High School; Sepulveda, CA	L 0–33	2,200	
October 16	at Sacramento State*	Charles C. Hughes Stadium; Sacramento, CA	L 0–26	1,000–1,400	
October 23	at No. 10 Long Beach State	Veterans Stadium; Long Beach, CA	L 6–54	5,214–6,500	
October 30	at Whittier*	Memorial Stadium; Whittier, CA	W 14–12	1,650	
November 6	Cal Poly Pomona*	Monroe High School; Sepulveda, CA	L 16–27	2,200–2,450	
November 13	San Diego State	Monroe High School; Sepulveda, CA	L 0–50	1,600–4,000	
November 20	at No. 3 Cal State Los Angeles	Rose Bowl; Pasadena, CA	L 0–56	1,100–2,774	
*Non-conference game; Rankings from AP Poll released prior to the game

== Team players in the NFL ==
No Valley State players were selected in the 1966 NFL draft.

The following finished their college career in 1965, were not drafted, but played in the NFL/AFL.

Player	Position	First NFL team
Max Choboian	QB	1966 Denver Broncos
