= Sheldon Harden =

American football player and coach (1920–2005)

Biographical details
- Born: October 18, 1920; Portola, California, U.S.
- Died: January 24, 2005 (aged 84); San Luis Obispo, California, U.S.

Playing career

Football
- 1939–1942: Santa Clara
- 1946–1947: Sacramento Nuggets

Coaching career (HC unless noted)

Football
- 1948–1961: Cal Poly (assistant)
- 1962–1967: Cal Poly

Wrestling
- 1948–1968: Cal Poly

Head coaching record
- Overall: 17–42 (football)

Frank Sheldon Harden (October 18, 1920 – January 24, 2005) was an American football player and coach. He served as the head football coach at California Polytechnic State University in San Luis Obispo, California from 1962 to 1967, compiling a record of 17–42. He also served as Cal Poly's first wrestling coach.

== Head coaching record ==
=== Football ===
Year	Team	Overall	Conference	Standing	Bowl/playoffs
Cal Poly Mustangs (California Collegiate Athletic Association) (1962–1967)
1962	Cal Poly	4–5	2–3	T–3rd	
1963	Cal Poly	2–8	0–4	5th	
1964	Cal Poly	0–10	0–5	6th	
1965	Cal Poly	2–8	1–4	5th	
1966	Cal Poly	6–4	2–3	T–4th	
1967	Cal Poly	3–7	1–4	5th	
Cal Poly:		17–42	6–23		
Total:		17–42			
