= Andy MacDonald (American football) =

American football player and coach (1930–1985)

Biographical details
- Born: January 2, 1930; Flint, Michigan, U.S.
- Died: May 24, 1985 (aged 55); Ludington, Michigan, U.S.

Playing career
- 1950–1951: Central Michigan
- Position: Quarterback

Coaching career (HC unless noted)
- 1954–1960: Flint Northern HS (MI)
- 1961–1974: Iowa (assistant)
- 1965–1968: Arizona State–Flagstaff / Northern Arizona
- 1969: Tulsa (backfield)
- 1970–1971: Colorado State (OC)
- 1973–1975: Michigan State (OC)
- 1976–1982: Seattle Seahawks (RB)
- 1983–1984: Buffalo Bills (RB)

Head coaching record
- Overall: 22–17–1 (college)

Andrew MacDonald (January 2, 1930 – May 24, 1985) was an American football player and coach. He served as the head football coach at Northern Arizona University (NAU) from 1965 to 1968, compiling a record of 22–17–1. MacDonald also was an assistant coach for the Seattle Seahawks and Buffalo Bills of the National Football League (NFL). He played college football for Central Michigan University (CMU), where he was a Little All-American at quarterback.

== Head coaching record ==
=== College ===
Year	Team	Overall	Conference	Standing	Bowl/playoffs
Arizona State–Flagstaff / Northern Arizona Lumberjacks (NCAA College Division independent) (1965–1968)
1965	Arizona State–Flagstaff	5–4–1			
1966	Northern Arizona	6–4			
1967	Northern Arizona	5–5			
1968	Northern Arizona	6–4			
Northern Arizona:		22–17–1			
Total:		22–17–1			
