= 1965 Cal Poly Mustangs football team =

American college football season

1965 Cal Poly Mustangs football
- Conference: California Collegiate Athletic Association
- Record: 2–8 (1–4 CCAA)
- Head coach: Sheldon Harden (4th season)
- Home stadium: Mustang Stadium

1965 California Collegiate Athletic Association football standings
	Conf.					Overall
Team	W		L		T	W		L		T
No. 4/2 Cal St Los Angeles $	5	–	0	–	0	9	–	1	–	0
No. NR/9 Long Beach State	4	–	1	–	0	9	–	1	–	0
San Diego State	3	–	2	–	0	8	–	2	–	0
Fresno State	1	–	3	–	0	6	–	4	–	0
Cal Poly	1	–	4	–	0	2	–	8	–	0
Valley State	0	–	4	–	0	1	–	9	–	0
$ – Conference champion; Rankings from AP/UPI small college polls

The 1965 Cal Poly Mustangs football team represented California Polytechnic State College—now known as California Polytechnic State University, San Luis Obispo—as a member of the California Collegiate Athletic Association (CCAA) during the 1965 NCAA College Division football season. Led by fourth-year head coach Sheldon Harden, Cal Poly compiled an overall record of 2–8 with a mark of 1–4 in conference play, placing fifth in the CCAA. The Mustangs played home games at Mustang Stadium in San Luis Obispo, California.

== Schedule ==
Date	Opponent	Site	Result	Attendance	Source
September 18	at San Francisco State*	Cox Stadium; San Francisco, CA	W 21–20	3,000	
September 25	Linfield*	Mustang Stadium; San Luis Obispo, CA	L 7–10		
October 2	at San Diego State	Aztec Bowl; San Diego, CA	L 0–41	12,371	
October 9	at Valley State	Monroe High School; Sepulveda, CA	W 33–0	2,200	
October 16	Fresno State	Mustang Stadium; San Luis Obispo, CA	L 14–20	7,000	
October 23	Cal Western*	Mustang Stadium; San Luis Obispo, CA	L 0–17		
October 30	No. 5 Long Beach State	Mustang Stadium; San Luis Obispo, CA	L 7–34	3,046–3,064	
November 6	at No. 4 Cal State Los Angeles	Rose Bowl; Pasadena, CA	L 3–7	4,876	
November 13	at Santa Clara*	Buck Shaw Stadium; Santa Clara, CA	L 2–6	3,500	
November 20	UC Santa Barbara*	Mustang Stadium; San Luis Obispo, CA	L 6–35	5,500	
*Non-conference game; Rankings from AP Poll released prior to the game
