= Richard S. Lyon =

American football player, coach, and administrator (1924–1976)

Biographical details
- Born: October 23, 1924; Elmira Heights, New York, U.S.
- Died: September 23, 1976 (aged 51); Troy, New York, U.S.

Playing career

Football
- 1942: Syracuse (freshman)
- c. 1944: North Carolina Pre-Flight
- 1945–1946: Colgate
- Positions: Quarterback, end

Coaching career (HC unless noted)

Football
- c. 1947: Springfield (GA)
- 1948–1952: Clyde HS (NY)
- 1953–1954: Wellsville Central HS (NY)
- 1955–1957: RPI
- 1958–1966: Ithaca
- 1967–1972: Army (DC)

Basketball
- 1948–1953: Clyde HS (NY)
- 1953–1955: Wellsville Central HS (NY)

Administrative career (AD unless noted)
- 1972–1976: RPI

Head coaching record
- Overall: 53–38 (college football); 39–14–4 (high school football)

Richard Smith Lyon (October 23, 1924 – September 23, 1976) was an American football player and coach and athletic administrator. He played college football as a quarterback at Colgate University (1945–1946) and held coaching positions at Rensselaer Polytechnic Institute (RPI) (head coach, 1955–1957), Ithaca College (head coach, 1958–1966), and the United States Military Academy (defensive coordinator, 1967–1972). He also served as athletic director at RPI from 1972 until his death in 1976.

== Early years and education ==
Lyon was born in 1924 in Elmira Heights, New York. He attended Thomas A. Edison High School in Elmira, playing baseball, basketball and football before graduating in 1942.

After graduating from high school, Lyon attended Syracuse University on a full scholarship and played on the freshman football team in 1942. He then entered the United States Navy and was assigned to the V-12 Navy College Training Program at St. Lawrence University. He was a Navy air cadet for two-and-a-half years. He also played football as an end on the North Carolina Pre-Flight Cloudbusters football team that also included Otto Graham, Spec Sanders, and Frank Aschenbrenner.

In 1945, after receiving his discharge from the Navy, Lyon enrolled at Colgate University. He played at the quarterback position for the Colgate Raiders football team and was mentored by that school's legendary football coach, Andy Kerr. He received his bachelor's degree from Colgate in 1947.

Lyon next enrolled at Springfield College where he was a graduate assistant football coach under Ossie Solem. Lyon received a master's degree in physical education and science from Springfield in 1950.

== Coaching and administrative career ==
Lyon began his coaching career as a high school football and basketball coach in Clyde, New York, from 1948 to 1953. His 1949 and 1950 Clyde football teams were unbeaten. He compiled an overall record of 30–7–3 at Clyde. He also coached football and basketball at Central High School in Wellsville, New York, from 1953 to 1954. At Wellsville, his football teams compiled a 9–6–1 record.

In May 1955, Lyon was hired as the head football coach at RPI in Troy, New York. He held that position for three years compiling records of 1–7 in 1955, 1–6 in 1956, and 2–5 in 1957.

In May 1958, Lyon was hired as the head football coach at Ithaca College in Ithaca, New York. He was the sixth head football coach at Ithaca College and held the position for nine seasons, from 1958 until 1966. His 1965 Ithaca Bombers football team compiled an 8–0 record, the first undefeated season in school history. Lyon's overall record at Ithaca was 49–20. Prior to Lyon's arrival, Ithaca had not finished with a winning record in seven years. During Lyon's tenure as head coach, the team never had a losing record.

In February 1967, Lyon was hired by the United States Military Academy to serve as defensive coordinator for the Army Cadets football team. In his first season as defensive coordinator, the 1967 Army Cadets compiled an 8–2 record led by Lyon's defensive unit that ranked seventh nationally out of 118 teams in scoring defense. He remained a member of Army's coaching staff through the 1972 season. Army's defensive performance declined in Lyon's later years with the program, ranking 96th in scoring defense in 1970, 64th in 1971, 113th in 1972.

Following the 1972 football season, Lyon left Army and returned to RPI as the school's athletic director. He was also the chairman of RPI's athletic-physical education departments. He remained RPI's athletic director for four years and led the renovation of the Troy Armory into an RPI sports and recreation center.

== Family and death ==
Lyon married Helen Lynch of Springfield, Massachusetts. They had two children, Kathryn and Timothy.

Lyon died in 1976 at age 51 at his home in Elnora, a suburb of Schenectady, New York. He suffered a heart attack after jogging.

== Head coaching record ==
=== College football ===
Year	Team	Overall	Conference	Standing	Bowl/playoffs
RPI Engineers (Independent) (1955–1957)
1955	RPI	1–7			
1956	RPI	1–6			
1957	RPI	2–5			
RPI:		4–18			
Ithaca Bombers (NCAA College Division independent) (1958–1966)
1958	Ithaca	6–1			
1959	Ithaca	5–2			
1960	Ithaca	4–3			
1961	Ithaca	4–4			
1962	Ithaca	6–2			
1963	Ithaca	6–2			
1964	Ithaca	6–2			
1965	Ithaca	8–0			
1966	Ithaca	4–4			
Ithaca:		49–20			
Total:		53–38			
