= 1965 UC Davis Aggies football team =

American college football season

1965 UC Davis Aggies football
- Conference: Far Western Conference
- Record: 4–6 (3–2 FWC)
- Head coach: Herb Schmalenberger (3rd season)
- Captains: Jack DeWit; Karl Frank
- Home stadium: Toomey Field

1965 Far Western Conference football standings
	Conf.					Overall
Team	W		L		T	W		L		T
San Francisco State $	5	–	0	–	0	8	–	2	–	0
Nevada	4	–	1	–	0	6	–	4	–	0
UC Davis	3	–	2	–	0	4	–	6	–	0
Humboldt State	2	–	3	–	0	6	–	4	–	0
Sacramento State	1	–	4	–	0	3	–	7	–	0
Chico State	0	–	5	–	0	4	–	6	–	0
Cal State Hayward*	0	–	0	–	0	3	–	7	–	0
$ – Conference champion; * – Games vs. Cal State Hayward did not count as conference games in 1965.

The 1965 UC Davis Aggies football team represented the University of California, Davis as a member of the Far Western Conference (FWC) during the 1965 NCAA College Division football season. Led by third-year head coach Herb Schmalenberger, the Aggies compiled an overall record of 4–6 with a mark of 3–2 in conference play, placing third in the FWC. The team was outscored by its opponents 187 to 157 for the season. The Aggies played home games at Toomey Field in Davis, California.

The UC Davis sports teams were commonly called the "Cal Aggies" from 1924 until the mid 1970s.

== Schedule ==
Date	Opponent	Site	Result	Attendance	Source
September 17	Santa Clara*	Toomey Field; Davis, CA	L 7–18	5,200	
September 25	at UC Riverside*	Highlander Stadium; Riverside, CA	L 14–16	1,800–2,200	
October 2	Whittier*	Toomey Field; Davis, CA	L 6–20	4,300	
October 9	at UC Santa Barbara*	La Playa Stadium; Santa Barbara, CA	L 6–34	5,000–5,200	
October 16	at Cal State Hayward*	Pioneer Stadium; Hayward, CA	W 34–6	1,000	
October 22	Chico State	Toomey Field; Davis, CA	W 20–12	5,800	
October 30	at Nevada	Mackay Stadium (Note: This stadium is the predecessor to the current Mackay Stadium, which was opened for the 1966 season.); Reno, NV	L 15–26	5,000	
November 5	Sacramento State	Toomey Field; Davis, CA (rivalry)	W 20–14	3,500–4,800	
November 13	at Humboldt State	Redwood Bowl; Arcata, CA	W 7–6	3,500–4,000	
November 20	San Francisco State	Toomey Field; Davis, CA	L 28–35	3,300–3,500	
*Non-conference game
