= 1965 Grantland Rice Bowl =

- 1965 Program cover
Ball State Cardinals	Tennessee A&I Tigers
(9–0)	(9–0)
Indiana Collegiate Conference	Midwestern Conference
14	14
Head coach: Ray Louthen	Head coach: John Merritt
	1	2	3	4	Total
Ball State	0	14	0	0	14
Tennessee A&I	6	0	0	8	14
- Date: December 11, 1965
- Season: 1965
- Stadium: Horace Jones Field
- Location: Murfreesboro, Tennessee
- Attendance: 12,000

The 1965 Grantland Rice Bowl was an NCAA College Division game following the 1965 season, between the Ball State Cardinals and the Tennessee A&I Tigers. Ball State quarterback Frank Houk was named the game's most outstanding player.

== Notable participants ==
Multiple players from Tennessee A&I were selected in the 1966 NFL draft – wide receiver Willie Walker, defensive tackle Franklin McRae, wide receiver Johnnie Robinson, and guard Jim Carer. Ball State running back Jim Todd was also selected. Tennessee A&I players selected in later drafts include running back Bill Tucker and return specialist Noland Smith in the 1967 NFL/AFL draft, also defensive end Claude Humphrey and quarterback Eldridge Dickey in the 1968 NFL/AFL draft. Humphrey was inducted to the Pro Football Hall of Fame in 2014. Ball State quarterback Frank Houk was a 1985–86 inductee to his university's hall of fame.

Tennessee A&I head coach John Merritt was inducted to the College Football Hall of Fame in 1994.

== Scoring summary ==
Scoring summary

Quarter	Time	Drive			Team	Scoring information	Score	
Quarter	Time	Plays	Yards	TOP	Team	Scoring information	Ball St.	Tenn. St.
1	3:05				Tenn A&I	Eldridge Dickey 1-yard touchdown run, Fletcher Smith kick failed	0	6
2	8:43				Ball St.	Steve Demuth 25-yard touchdown reception from Frank Houk, Bill Hajec kick good	7	6
2	0:14				Ball St.	Jim Todd 18-yard touchdown reception from Frank Houk, Bill Hajec kick good	14	6
4	2:01				Tenn A&I	Noland Smith 74-yard punt return, 2-point pass good (Eldridge Dickey to Johnnie Robinson)	14	14
"TOP" = time of possession. For other American football terms, see Glossary of American football.							14	14
