= 1965 Tennessee A&I Tigers football team =

American college football season

1965 Tennessee A&I Tigers football

Black college national champion MWAA champion

Grantland Rice Bowl, T 14–14 vs. Ball State
- Conference: Midwest Athletic Association
- Record: 9–0–1 (3–0 MWAA)
- Head coach: John Merritt (3rd season)
- Home stadium: Hale Stadium

1965 Midwest Athletic Association football standings
	Conf.					Overall
Team	W		L		T	W		L		T
No. 1 Tennessee A&I $	3	–	0	–	0	9	–	0	–	1
Lincoln (MO)	2	–	1	–	0	5	–	5	–	0
Central State (OH)	1	–	2	–	0	3	–	5	–	0
Kentucky State	0	–	3	–	0	4	–	4	–	0
$ – Conference champion; Rankings from Pittsburgh Courier

The 1965 Tennessee A&I Tigers football team represented Tennessee Agricultural & Industrial State College as a member of the Midwest Athletic Association (MWAA) during the 1965 NCAA College Division football season. In their third season under head coach John Merritt, the Tigers compiled a 9–0–1 record, won the MWAA championship, and outscored opponents by a total of 333 to 108. The team was also recognized as the 1965 black college national champion and was ranked No. 5 in the final small college football rankings issued by the Associated Press and No. 12 in the final poll issued by the United Press International.

On December 11, Tennessee A&I played in the 1965 Grantland Rice Bowl against Ball State. It was the first college football game in Tennessee between an all-black team and a predominantly white team.

Key players included quarterback Eldridge Dickey, fullback Bill Tucker, halfback Noland Smith, wide receiver Willie Walker, split end Johnnie Robinson, middle guard/tackle James Carter, defensive lineman Franklin McRae, and defensive backs Alvin Coleman and Leon Moore. Coach Merritt described Carter as "the best lineman I've ever coached."

== Schedule ==
Date	Opponent	Rank	Site	Result	Attendance	Source
September 25	North Carolina A&T*		Hale Stadium; Nashville, TN	W 42–12		
October 2	at Texas Southern*		Jeppesen Stadium; Houston, TX	W 32–7	10,000	
October 9	Grambling*		Hale Stadium; Nashville, TN	W 40–7	8,000–24,000	
October 23	Florida A&M*		Hale Stadium; Nashville, TN	W 45–6	16,500	
October 30	at Southern*	No. 9	University Stadium; Baton Rouge, LA	W 40–36	18,000	
November 6	at Morris Brown*	No. 6	Herndon Stadium; Atlanta, GA	W 24–0		
November 13	vs. Lincoln (MO)	No. 7	Busch Stadium; St. Louis, MO (Gateway Classic)	W 31–6	5,600	
November 20	at Kentucky State	No. 7	Alumni Field; Frankfort, KY	W 19–8	3,500	
November 25	Central State (OH)^{†}	No. 5	Hale Stadium; Nashville, TN	W 46–12	9,000	
December 11	vs. Ball State*	No. 5	Horace Jones Field; Murfreesboro, TN (Grantland Rice Bowl)	T 14–14	12,000	
*Non-conference game; ^{†}Homecoming; Rankings from AP Poll released prior to the game
