= Ted Dunn =

American football player and coach (1920–2016)

Biographical details
- Born: January 15, 1920; Hamilton, New York, U.S.
- Died: April 22, 2016 (aged 96); Springfield, Massachusetts, U.S.

Playing career
- 1939–1941: Colgate

Coaching career (HC unless noted)
- 1946–1957: Springfield (assistant)
- 1958–1975: Springfield

Head coaching record
- Overall: 69–91–4

Edward Thomas Dunn (January 15, 1920 – April 22, 2016) was an American college football player and coach. He served as the head football coach at Springfield College in Springfield, Massachusetts from 1958 to 1975, compiling a record of 69–91–4. He led Springfield to a perfect 9–0 season in 1965.

== Head coaching record ==
Year	Team	Overall	Conference	Standing	Bowl/playoffs
Springfield Maroons/Chiefs (NCAA College Division / NCAA Division II independent) (1958–1975)
1958	Springfield	1–7–1			
1959	Springfield	5–4			
1960	Springfield	2–6–1			
1961	Springfield	0–7–1			
1962	Springfield	1–7			
1963	Springfield	5–4			
1964	Springfield	3–6			
1965	Springfield	9–0			
1966	Springfield	7–2			
1967	Springfield	5–4			
1968	Springfield	7–2			
1969	Springfield	6–3			
1970	Springfield	6–3			
1971	Springfield	2–7–1			
1972	Springfield	0–9			
1973	Springfield	3–7			
1974	Springfield	4–6			
1975	Springfield	3–7			
Springfield:		69–91–4			
Total:		69–91–4			
