= 1965 Humboldt State Lumberjacks football team =

American college football season

1965 Humboldt State Lumberjacks football
- Conference: Far Western Conference
- Record: 6–4 (2–3 FWC)
- Head coach: Phil Sarboe (15th season)
- Home stadium: Redwood Bowl

1965 Far Western Conference football standings
	Conf.					Overall
Team	W		L		T	W		L		T
San Francisco State $	5	–	0	–	0	8	–	2	–	0
Nevada	4	–	1	–	0	6	–	4	–	0
UC Davis	3	–	2	–	0	4	–	6	–	0
Humboldt State	2	–	3	–	0	6	–	4	–	0
Sacramento State	1	–	4	–	0	3	–	7	–	0
Chico State	0	–	5	–	0	4	–	6	–	0
Cal State Hayward*	0	–	0	–	0	3	–	7	–	0
$ – Conference champion; * – Games vs. Cal State Hayward did not count as conference games in 1965.

The 1965 Humboldt State Lumberjacks football team represented Humboldt State College—now known as California State Polytechnic University, Humboldt—as a member of the Far Western Conference (FWC) during the 1965 NCAA College Division football season. Led by Phil Sarboe in his 15th and final year as head coach, the Lumberjacks compiled an overall record of 8–2 with a mark of 4–1 in conference play, placing second in the FWC. The team was outscored by its opponents 131 to 128 for the season. Humboldt State played home games at the Redwood Bowl in Arcata, California.

Sarboe's tenure at Humboldt State was the most successful in school history. He is the only coach to win over 100 games at Humboldt State, finishing with a record of 104–37–5 (.729). His winning percentage is the highest in school history, and his teams had 13 winning seasons and only one losing season. The Lumberjacks won or shared the conference championship in five of his 15 seasons: 1952, 1956, 1960, 1961, and 1963.

== Schedule ==
Date	Opponent	Site	Result	Attendance	Source
September 18	Central Washington*	Redwood Bowl; Arcata, CA	W 7–0	5,000	
September 25	at Hawaii*	Honolulu Stadium; Honolulu, HI	W 14–6	5,500	
October 2	Willamette*	Redwood Bowl; Arcata, CA	L 7–12	5,700	
October 9	at UBC*	Thunderbird Stadium; University Endowment Lands, BC	W 21–13	500	
October 16	Linfield*	Redwood Bowl; Arcata, CA	W 20–14	5,500	
October 23	at San Francisco State	Cox Stadium; San Francisco, CA	L 0–27	2,500	
October 30	Sacramento State	Redwood Bowl; Arcata, CA	W 12–7	4,500–5,000	
November 6	at Chico State	College Field; Chico, CA	W 23–13	4,000	
November 13	UC Davis	Redwood Bowl; Arcata, CA	L 6–7	3,500–4,000	
November 20	Nevada	Redwood Bowl; Arcata, CA	L 18–32	5,000	
*Non-conference game
