= 1965 Akron Zips football team =

American college football season

1965 Akron Zips football
- Conference: Ohio Athletic Conference
- Record: 5–3–1 (4–1 OAC)
- Head coach: Gordon K. Larson (5th season)
- Captain: Jim Barton
- Home stadium: Rubber Bowl

1965 Ohio Athletic Conference football standings
| | Conf. | | | | | Overall |
| Team | W | | L | | T | W | | L | | T |
|---|---|---|---|---|---|---|---|---|---|---|
| Muskingum $ | 7 | – | 0 | – | 0 | 8 | – | 1 | – | 0 |
| Wittenberg | 4 | – | 1 | – | 0 | 6 | – | 2 | – | 0 |
| Akron | 4 | – | 1 | – | 0 | 5 | – | 3 | – | 1 |
| Mount Union | 5 | – | 2 | – | 0 | 7 | – | 2 | – | 0 |
| Capital | 5 | – | 2 | – | 0 | 6 | – | 2 | – | 0 |
| Denison | 5 | – | 2 | – | 0 | 6 | – | 3 | – | 0 |
| Otterbein | 4 | – | 3 | – | 0 | 4 | – | 5 | – | 0 |
| Hiram | 3 | – | 4 | – | 0 | 4 | – | 4 | – | 0 |
| Wooster | 3 | – | 4 | – | 0 | 4 | – | 5 | – | 0 |
| Baldwin–Wallace | 2 | – | 3 | – | 0 | 4 | – | 3 | – | 1 |
| Ohio Wesleyan | 1 | – | 3 | – | 1 | 3 | – | 5 | – | 1 |
| Heidelberg | 1 | – | 5 | – | 1 | 2 | – | 5 | – | 2 |
| Oberlin | 1 | – | 5 | – | 0 | 1 | – | 7 | – | 0 |
| Kenyon | 0 | – | 5 | – | 0 | 1 | – | 8 | – | 0 |
| Marietta | 0 | – | 5 | – | 0 | 1 | – | 8 | – | 0 |
$ – Conference champion

The 1965 Akron Zips football team represented Akron University in the 1965 NCAA College Division football season as a member of the Ohio Athletic Conference (OAC). Led by fifth-year head coach Gordon K. Larson, the Zips played their home games at the Rubber Bowl in Akron, Ohio. They finished the season with a record of 5–3–1 overall and 4–1 in conference play, tying for second place in the OAC. They outscored their opponents 110–94.

== Schedule ==
| Date | Opponent | Site | Result | Attendance | Source |
|---|---|---|---|---|---|
| September 18 | Western Kentucky* | Rubber Bowl; Akron, OH | T 6–6 | 40,165 | |
| September 25 | at San Diego State* | Balboa Stadium; San Diego, CA | L 0–41 | 29,869 | |
| October 2 | at Wittenberg | Wittenberg Stadium; Springfield, OH | W 18–0 | 7,600 | |
| October 9 | Ball State* | Rubber Bowl; Akron, OH | L 14–16 | 2,029 | |
| October 16 | at Wooster | Wooster, OH | W 21–8 | 5,500 | |
| October 23 | Capital | Rubber Bowl; Akron, OH | L 6–15 | 4,113 | |
| October 30 | at Baldwin–Wallace | Berea, OH | W 17–0 | 8,500 | |
| November 6 | Butler* | Rubber Bowl; Akron, OH | W 14–7 | 2,290 | |
| November 13 | at Heidelberg | Tiffin, OH | W 14–0 | 3,000 | |
*Non-conference game
