= 1965 Long Beach State 49ers football team =

American college football season

1965 Long Beach State 49ers football
- Conference: California Collegiate Athletic Association
- Record: 9–1 (4–1 CCAA)
- Head coach: Don Reed (8th season)
- Home stadium: Veterans Memorial Stadium

1965 California Collegiate Athletic Association football standings
| | Conf. | | | | | Overall |
| Team | W | | L | | T | W | | L | | T |
|---|---|---|---|---|---|---|---|---|---|---|
| No. 4/2 Cal St Los Angeles $ | 5 | – | 0 | – | 0 | 9 | – | 1 | – | 0 |
| No. NR/9 Long Beach State | 4 | – | 1 | – | 0 | 9 | – | 1 | – | 0 |
| San Diego State | 3 | – | 2 | – | 0 | 8 | – | 2 | – | 0 |
| Fresno State | 1 | – | 3 | – | 0 | 6 | – | 4 | – | 0 |
| Cal Poly | 1 | – | 4 | – | 0 | 2 | – | 8 | – | 0 |
| Valley State | 0 | – | 4 | – | 0 | 1 | – | 9 | – | 0 |
$ – Conference champion; Rankings from AP/UPI small college polls

The 1965 Long Beach State 49ers football team represented California State College, Long Beach—now known as California State University, Long Beach—as a member of the California Collegiate Athletic Association (CCAA) during the 1965 NCAA College Division football season. Led by eighth-year head coach Don Reed, the 49ers compiled an overall record of 9–1 with a mark of 4–1 in conference play, placing second in the CCAA. Long Beach State entered the AP small college poll rankings after an upset of No. 3 San Diego State on October 9. The 49ers were ranked as high as No. 5, but dropped to No. 9 after a loss to Cal State Los Angeles on November 13 and then fell out of the final rankings despite a win over the Pacific Tigers in the season finale. The team played home games at Veterans Memorial Stadium adjacent to the campus of Long Beach City College in Long Beach, California.

== Schedule ==
| Date | Time | Opponent | Rank | Site | Result | Attendance | Source |
|---|---|---|---|---|---|---|---|
| September 18 | 8:00 pm | Nevada* | | Veterans Memorial Stadium; Long Beach, CA | W 47–0 | 3,154 | |
| September 25 | 8:00 pm | at Cal Poly Pomona* | | Kellogg Field; Pomona, CA | W 33–6 | 2,600–3,000 | |
| October 2 | 8:00 pm | Sacramento State* | | Veterans Memorial Stadium; Long Beach, CA | W 34–7 | 4,449–4,500 | |
| October 9 | 8:00 pm | at No. 3 San Diego State | | Aztec Bowl; San Diego, CA | W 35–32 | 16,638 | |
| October 16 | 8:00 pm | at UC Santa Barbara* | | La Playa Stadium; Santa Barbara, CA | W 28–7 | 9,800 | |
| October 23 | 8:00 pm | Valley State | No. 10 | Veterans Memorial Stadium; Long Beach, CA | W 54–6 | 5,214–6,500 | |
| October 30 | 8:00 pm | at Cal Poly | No. 5 | Mustang Stadium; San Luis Obispo, CA | W 34–7 | 3,046–3,064 | |
| November 6 | 8:00 pm | Fresno State | No. 5 | Veterans Memorial Stadium; Long Beach, CA | W 14–12 | 9,100–9,120 | |
| November 13 | 8:00 pm | No. 3 Cal State Los Angeles | No. 5 | Veterans Memorial Stadium; Long Beach, CA | L 21–27 | 18,297 | |
| November 20 | 8:00 pm | at Pacific (CA)* | No. 9 | Pacific Memorial Stadium; Stockton, CA | W 27–7 | 1,500–4,000 | |
*Non-conference game; Rankings from AP Poll released prior to the game; All times are in Pacific time

== Team players in the NFL ==
The following were selected in the 1966 NFL draft.

| Player | Position | Round | Overall | NFL team |
| Les Shy | Running back | 12 | 173 | Dallas Cowboys |
