= 1965 Pacific Tigers football team =

American college football season

1965 Pacific Tigers football
- Conference: Independent
- Record: 1–8
- Head coach: Don Campora (2nd season)
- Home stadium: Pacific Memorial Stadium

1965 NCAA College Division independents football records
	Conf.			Overall
Team	W	L	T	W		L		T
Springfield		–		9	–	0	–	0
Ithaca		–		8	–	0	–	0
Parsons		–		8	–	1	–	0
Santa Clara		–		8	–	1	–	0
UC Santa Barbara		–		8	–	2	–	0
Cortland		–		7	–	2	–	0
Wabash		–		7	–	2	–	0
Northeastern		–		6	–	2	–	0
UC Riverside		–		6	–	2	–	0
Tampa		–		6	–	2	–	1
Northern Michigan		–		7	–	3	–	0
Mississippi Valley State		–		6	–	3	–	0
St. Norbert		–		6	–	3	–	0
Rose Poly		–		5	–	3	–	0
Drake		–		6	–	4	–	0
Chattanooga		–		5	–	4	–	1
Arizona State–Flagstaff		–		5	–	4	–	1
Lake Forest		–		4	–	4	–	0
Cal Poly Pomona		–		4	–	5	–	0
Howard (AL)		–		4	–	6	–	0
Portland State		–		4	–	6	–	0
Colorado College		–		3	–	5	–	0
Milwaukee		–		2	–	6	–	0
Southern Illinois		–		2	–	8	–	0
Pacific (CA)		–		2	–	8	–	0
Hawaii		–		1	–	8	–	1
Carnegie Tech		–		1	–	7	–	0
Wheaton (IL)		–		1	–	8	–	0

The 1965 Pacific Tigers football team represented the University of the Pacific (UOP) as an independent during the 1965 NCAA College Division football season. Led by Don Campora in his second and final season as head coach, the Tigers compiled a record of 1–8 and were outscored by opponents 250 to 81. The team played home games at Pacific Memorial Stadium in Stockton, California.

== Schedule ==
Date	Opponent	Site	Result	Attendance	Source
September 18	at San Diego State	Aztec Bowl; San Diego, CA	L 6–46	10,050	
September 25	at Iowa State	Clyde Williams Field; Ames, IA	L 13–38	16,000	
October 2	Hawaii	Pacific Memorial Stadium; Stockton, CA	W 21–0	4,000–5,500	
October 9	at New Mexico State	Memorial Stadium (Note: This stadium is the predecessor to the current Memorial Stadium on the New Mexico State campus, which was opened for the 1978 season); Las Cruces, NM	L 6–14	5,000	
October 23	Air Force	Pacific Memorial Stadium; Stockton, CA	L 0–40	11,000	
October 30	Montana	Pacific Memorial Stadium; Stockton, CA	L 7–13	7,790–7,900	
November 6	at San Jose State	Spartan Stadium; San Jose, CA (Victory Bell)	L 21–52	17,300	
November 13	Fresno State	Pacific Memorial Stadium; Stockton, CA	L 0–20	1,000–4,000	
November 20	No. 9 Long Beach State	Pacific Memorial Stadium; Stockton, CA	L 7–27	1,500–4,000	
November 26	at Cal State Los Angeles	Rose Bowl; Pasadena, CA	Cancelled (flooding)		
Rankings from AP Poll released prior to the game; Source:

== Team players in the NFL ==
No University of the Pacific players were selected in the 1965 NFL draft.

The following finished their college career at Pacific, were not drafted, but played in the AFL or NFL starting with the 1966 season.

Player	Position	First AFL team
Bill Sandeman	Tackle, defensive tackle	1966 Dallas Cowboys
Paul Latzke	Center	1966 San Diego Chargers
