= 1965 Fresno State Bulldogs football team =

American college football season

1965 Fresno State Bulldogs football
- Conference: California Collegiate Athletic Association
- Record: 6–4 (1–3 CCAA)
- Head coach: Phil Krueger (2nd season)
- Home stadium: Ratcliffe Stadium

1965 California Collegiate Athletic Association football standings
	Conf.					Overall
Team	W		L		T	W		L		T
No. 4/2 Cal St Los Angeles $	5	–	0	–	0	9	–	1	–	0
No. NR/9 Long Beach State	4	–	1	–	0	9	–	1	–	0
San Diego State	3	–	2	–	0	8	–	2	–	0
Fresno State	1	–	3	–	0	6	–	4	–	0
Cal Poly	1	–	4	–	0	2	–	8	–	0
Valley State	0	–	4	–	0	1	–	9	–	0
$ – Conference champion; Rankings from AP/UPI small college polls

The 1965 Fresno State Bulldogs football team represented Fresno State College—now known as California State University, Fresno—as a member of the California Collegiate Athletic Association (CCAA) during the 1965 NCAA College Division football season. Led by Phil Krueger in his second and final season as head coach, Fresno State compiled an overall record of 6–4 with a mark of 1–3 in conference play, placing fourth in the CCAA. The Bulldogs played home games at Ratcliffe Stadium on the campus of Fresno City College in Fresno, California.

== Schedule ==
Date	Opponent	Rank	Site	Result	Attendance	Source
September 25	at Colorado*		Folsom Field; Boulder, CO	L 7–10	29,000	
October 2	Washburn*		Ratcliffe Stadium; Fresno, CA	W 54–0	9,388	
October 9	Montana State*		Ratcliffe Stadium; Fresno, CA	W 25–14	10,862–12,000	
October 16	at Cal Poly		Mustang Stadium; San Luis Obispo, CA	W 23–13	7,000	
October 23	No. 4 Cal State Los Angeles	No. 8	Ratcliffe Stadium; Fresno, CA	L 12–32	13,455	
October 30	San Diego State		Ratcliffe Stadium; Fresno, CA (rivalry)	L 7–26	9,009	
November 6	at No. 6 Long Beach State		Veterans Memorial Stadium; Long Beach, CA	L 12–14	9,100–9,120	
November 13	at Pacific (CA)*		Pacific Memorial Stadium; Stockton, CA	W 20–0	1,000–4,000	
November 20	San Jose State*		Ratcliffe Stadium; Fresno, CA (rivalry)	W 24–18	8,500	
November 27	at Hawaii*		Honolulu Stadium; Honolulu, HI (rivalry)	W 7–3	2,356	
*Non-conference game; Rankings from AP Poll released prior to the game; Source:

== Team players in the NFL ==
No Fresno State Bulldogs were selected in the 1966 NFL draft.
