= 1965 Chico State Wildcats football team =

American college football season

1965 Chico State Wildcats football
- Conference: Far Western Conference
- Record: 4–6 (0–5 FWC)
- Head coach: George Maderos (8th season)
- Home stadium: College Field

1965 Far Western Conference football standings
	Conf.					Overall
Team	W		L		T	W		L		T
San Francisco State $	5	–	0	–	0	8	–	2	–	0
Nevada	4	–	1	–	0	6	–	4	–	0
UC Davis	3	–	2	–	0	4	–	6	–	0
Humboldt State	2	–	3	–	0	6	–	4	–	0
Sacramento State	1	–	4	–	0	3	–	7	–	0
Chico State	0	–	5	–	0	4	–	6	–	0
Cal State Hayward*	0	–	0	–	0	3	–	7	–	0
$ – Conference champion; * – Games vs. Cal State Hayward did not count as conference games in 1965.

The 1965 Chico State Wildcats football team represented Chico State College—now known as California State University, Chico—as a member of the Far Western Conference (FWC) during the 1965 NCAA College Division football season. Led by eighth-year head coach George Maderos, Chico State compiled an overall record of 4–6 with a mark of 0–5 in conference play, placing last out of six teams eligible for the championship in the FWC. The team was outscored by its opponents 223 to 175 for the season. The Wildcats played home games at College Field in Chico, California.

== Schedule ==
Date	Time	Opponent	Site	Result	Attendance	Source
September 18		San Francisco*	College Field; Chico, CA	W 18–6	4,400	
September 25		at Oregon Tech*	Klamath Falls, OR	W 10–7		
October 2		at Cal State Hayward*	Pioneer Stadium; Hayward, CA	W 38–6		
October 9	2:00 p.m.	at Cal Western*	Balboa Stadium; San Diego, CA	L 17–21		
October 16		Southern Oregon*	College Field; Chico, CA	W 34–26		
October 22		at UC Davis	Toomey Field; Davis, CA	L 12–20	5,800	
October 30		San Francisco State	College Field; Chico, CA	L 20–63	7,500	
November 6		Humboldt State	College Field; Chico, CA	L 13–23	4,000	
November 13		at Nevada	Mackay Stadium (Note: This stadium is the predecessor to the current Mackay Stadium, which was opened for the 1966 season.); Reno, NV	L 6–24	2,500	
November 20		Sacramento State	College Field; Chico, CA	L 7–27	2,500	
*Non-conference game; All times are in Pacific time
