= 1965 Ball State Cardinals football team =

American college football season

1965 Ball State Cardinals football

ICC champion

Grantland Rice Bowl, T 14–14 vs. Tennessee A&I
- Conference: Indiana Collegiate Conference
- Record: 9–0–1 (6–0 ICC)
- Head coach: Ray Louthen (4th season)
- Home stadium: Ball State Field

1965 Indiana Collegiate Conference football standings
	Conf.					Overall
Team	W		L		T	W		L		T
Ball State $^	6	–	0	–	0	9	–	0	–	1
Butler	4	–	2	–	0	6	–	3	–	0
Evansville	3	–	3	–	0	5	–	4	–	0
Indiana State	2	–	3	–	1	4	–	3	–	1
Saint Joseph's (IN)	2	–	4	–	0	3	–	5	–	0
Valparaiso	2	–	4	–	0	3	–	6	–	0
DePauw	1	–	4	–	1	2	–	6	–	1
$ – Conference champion; ^ – Grantland Rice Bowl participant

The 1965 Ball State Cardinals football team was an American football team that represented Ball State University in the Indiana Collegiate Conference (ICC) during the 1965 NCAA College Division football season. In its fourth season under head coach Ray Louthen, the team compiled a 9–0 record in the regular season and played Tennessee A&I to a 14–14 tie in the 1965 Grantland Rice Bowl.

== Schedule ==
Date	Opponent	Site	Result	Attendance	Source
September 18	Indiana (PA)*	Ball State Field; Muncie, IN	W 26–14	10,000	
September 25	at Valparaiso	Valparaiso, IN	W 14–6	5,333	
October 2	Evansville	Ball State Field; Muncie, IN	W 42–13	12,100	
October 9	at Akron*	Akron, IN	W 16–14	4,000	
October 16	at DePauw	Greencastle, IN	W 51–29	2,300	
October 23	Butler	Ball State Field; Muncie, IN	W 22–7	7,100	
October 30	at Indiana State	Terre Haute, IN (Blue Key Victory Bell)	W 52–15	3,500	
November 6	Saint Joseph's (IN)	Ball State Field; Muncie, IN	W 42–19	7,900	
November 13	Southern Illinois*	Ball State Field; Muncie, IN	W 30–19	8,200	
December 11	vs. No. 5 Tennessee A&I*	Horace Jones Field; Murfreesboro, TN (Grantland Rice Bowl)	T 14–14	12,000	
*Non-conference game; Rankings from AP Poll released prior to the game
