= 1965 Nevada Wolf Pack football team =

American college football season

1965 Nevada Wolf Pack football
- Conference: Far Western Conference
- Record: 6–4 (4–1 FWC)
- Head coach: Dick Trachok (7th season)
- Home stadium: Mackay Stadium

1965 Far Western Conference football standings
	Conf.					Overall
Team	W		L		T	W		L		T
San Francisco State $	5	–	0	–	0	8	–	2	–	0
Nevada	4	–	1	–	0	6	–	4	–	0
UC Davis	3	–	2	–	0	4	–	6	–	0
Humboldt State	2	–	3	–	0	6	–	4	–	0
Sacramento State	1	–	4	–	0	3	–	7	–	0
Chico State	0	–	5	–	0	4	–	6	–	0
Cal State Hayward*	0	–	0	–	0	3	–	7	–	0
$ – Conference champion; * – Games vs. Cal State Hayward did not count as conference games in 1965.

The 1965 Nevada Wolf Pack football team represented the University of Nevada during the 1965 NCAA College Division football season. Nevada competed as a member of the Far Western Conference (FWC). The Wolf Pack were led by seventh-year head coach Dick Trachok and played their home games at Mackay Stadium.

== Schedule ==
Date	Opponent	Site	Result	Attendance	Source
September 18	at Long Beach State*	Veterans Memorial Stadium; Long Beach, CA	L 0–47	3,154	
September 25	Willamette*	Mackay Stadium; Reno, NV	L 6–9		
October 2	UC Santa Barbara*	Mackay Stadium; Reno, NV	L 18–21	3,500	
October 9	Cal State Hayward*	Mackay Stadium; Reno, NV	W 42–0		
October 16	at San Francisco*	Kezar Stadium; San Francisco, CA	W 34–6		
October 23	at Sacramento State	Charles C. Hughes Stadium; Sacramento, CA	W 20–13	3,500	
October 30	UC Davis^{†}	Mackay Stadium; Reno, NV	W 26–15	5,000	
November 6	at San Francisco State	Cox Stadium; San Francisco, CA	L 8–27	4,500	
November 13	Chico State	Mackay Stadium; Reno, NV	W 24–6	2,500	
November 20	at Humboldt State	Redwood Bowl; Arcata, CA	W 32–18	5,000	
*Non-conference game; ^{†}Homecoming
