= 1965 Sacramento State Hornets football team =

American college football season

1965 Sacramento State Hornets football
- Conference: Far Western Conference
- Record: 3–7 (1–4 FWC)
- Head coach: Ray Clemons (5th season)
- Home stadium: Charles C. Hughes Stadium

1965 Far Western Conference football standings
	Conf.					Overall
Team	W		L		T	W		L		T
San Francisco State $	5	–	0	–	0	8	–	2	–	0
Nevada	4	–	1	–	0	6	–	4	–	0
UC Davis	3	–	2	–	0	4	–	6	–	0
Humboldt State	2	–	3	–	0	6	–	4	–	0
Sacramento State	1	–	4	–	0	3	–	7	–	0
Chico State	0	–	5	–	0	4	–	6	–	0
Cal State Hayward*	0	–	0	–	0	3	–	7	–	0
$ – Conference champion; * – Games vs. Cal State Hayward did not count as conference games in 1965.

The 1965 Sacramento State Hornets football team represented Sacramento State College—now known as California State University, Sacramento—as a member of the Far Western Conference (FWC) during the 1965 NCAA College Division football season. Led by fifth-year head coach Ray Clemons, Sacramento State compiled an overall record of 3–7 with a mark of 1–4 in conference play, placing fifth in the FWC. For the season the team was outscored by its opponents 171 to 115. The Hornets played home games at Hornet Field in Sacramento, California.

== Schedule ==
Date	Opponent	Site	Result	Attendance	Source
September 18	Portland State*	Charles C. Hughes Stadium; Sacramento, CA	W 7–6	2,100	
September 25	Santa Clara*	Charles C. Hughes Stadium; Sacramento, CA	L 0–35	2,934	
October 2	at Long Beach State*	Veterans Stadium; Long Beach, CA	L 7–34	4,449–4,500	
October 9	at Cal Poly Pomona*	Kellogg Field; Pomona, CA	L 14–34	2,200–2,500	
October 16	Valley State	Charles C. Hughes Stadium; Sacramento, CA	W 26–0	1,000–1,400	
October 23	Nevada	Charles C. Hughes Stadium; Sacramento, CA	L 13–20	3,500	
October 30	at Humboldt State	Redwood Bowl; Arcata, CA	L 7–12	4,500–5,000	
November 5	at UC Davis	Toomey Field; Davis, CA (rivalry)	L 14–20	3,500–4,800	
November 13	San Francisco State	Charles C. Hughes Stadium; Sacramento, CA	L 0–3	700–720	
November 20	at Chico State	College Field; Chico, CA	W 27–7	2,500	
*Non-conference game
