= 1965 Southern Illinois Salukis football team =

American college football season

1965 Southern Illinois Salukis football
- Conference: Independent
- Record: 2–8
- Head coach: Don Shroyer (2nd season)
- Home stadium: McAndrew Stadium

1965 NCAA College Division independents football records
	Conf.			Overall
Team	W	L	T	W		L		T
Springfield		–		9	–	0	–	0
Ithaca		–		8	–	0	–	0
Parsons		–		8	–	1	–	0
Santa Clara		–		8	–	1	–	0
UC Santa Barbara		–		8	–	2	–	0
Cortland		–		7	–	2	–	0
Wabash		–		7	–	2	–	0
Northeastern		–		6	–	2	–	0
UC Riverside		–		6	–	2	–	0
Tampa		–		6	–	2	–	1
Northern Michigan		–		7	–	3	–	0
Mississippi Valley State		–		6	–	3	–	0
St. Norbert		–		6	–	3	–	0
Rose Poly		–		5	–	3	–	0
Drake		–		6	–	4	–	0
Chattanooga		–		5	–	4	–	1
Arizona State–Flagstaff		–		5	–	4	–	1
Lake Forest		–		4	–	4	–	0
Cal Poly Pomona		–		4	–	5	–	0
Howard (AL)		–		4	–	6	–	0
Portland State		–		4	–	6	–	0
Colorado College		–		3	–	5	–	0
Milwaukee		–		2	–	6	–	0
Southern Illinois		–		2	–	8	–	0
Pacific (CA)		–		2	–	8	–	0
Hawaii		–		1	–	8	–	1
Carnegie Tech		–		1	–	7	–	0
Wheaton (IL)		–		1	–	8	–	0

The 1965 Southern Illinois Salukis football team was an American football team that represented Southern Illinois University (now known as Southern Illinois University Carbondale) as an independent during the 1965 NCAA College Division football season. Under second-year head coach Don Shroyer, the team compiled a 2–8 record. The team played its home games at McAndrew Stadium in Carbondale, Illinois.

== Schedule ==
Date	Opponent	Site	Result	Attendance	Source
September 18	State College of Iowa	McAndrew Stadium; Carbondale, IL	W 23–16	7,200	
September 25	at Louisville	Fairgrounds Stadium; Louisville, KY	L 0–13	7,200	
October 2	Youngstown State	McAndrew Stadium; Carbondale, IL	L 7–9		
October 9	Lincoln (MO)	McAndrew Stadium; Carbondale, IL	L 6–9		
October 16	Drake	Drake Stadium; Des Moines, IA	L 12–18		
October 23	at Wichita State	Veterans Field; Wichita, KS	L 0–27	9,615	
October 30	Tulsa	McAndrew Stadium; Carbondale, IL	L 12–55	15,000	
November 6	Northern Michigan	McAndrew Stadium; Carbondale, IL	L 6–24		
November 13	at Ball State	Ball State Field; Muncie, IN	L 19–30	8,200	
November 20	Southwest Missouri State	McAndrew Stadium; Carbondale, IL	W 19–6		
