= 1965 San Francisco State Gators football team =

American college football season

1965 San Francisco State Gators football

FWC champion
- Conference: Far Western Conference
- Record: 8–2 (5–0 FWC)
- Head coach: Vic Rowen (5th season)
- Home stadium: Cox Stadium

1965 Far Western Conference football standings
	Conf.					Overall
Team	W		L		T	W		L		T
San Francisco State $	5	–	0	–	0	8	–	2	–	0
Nevada	4	–	1	–	0	6	–	4	–	0
UC Davis	3	–	2	–	0	4	–	6	–	0
Humboldt State	2	–	3	–	0	6	–	4	–	0
Sacramento State	1	–	4	–	0	3	–	7	–	0
Chico State	0	–	5	–	0	4	–	6	–	0
Cal State Hayward*	0	–	0	–	0	3	–	7	–	0
$ – Conference champion; * – Games vs. Cal State Hayward did not count as conference games in 1965.

The 1965 San Francisco State Gators football team represented San Francisco State College—now known as San Francisco State University—as a member of the Far Western Conference (FWC) during the 1965 NCAA College Division football season. Led by fifth-year head coach Vic Rowen, San Francisco State compiled an overall record of 8–2 with a mark of 5–0 in conference play, winning the FWC title. This was the fourth title in five years for the Gators. For the season the team outscored its opponents 289 to 107. The Gators played home games at Cox Stadium in San Francisco.

== Schedule ==
Date	Opponent	Site	Result	Attendance	Source
September 18	Cal Poly*	Cox Stadium; San Francisco, CA	L 20–21	3,000	
September 25	Cal State Hayward*	Cox Stadium; San Francisco, CA	W 37–6	3,000	
October 2	Valley State*	Cox Stadium; San Francisco, CA	W 27–0	1,000	
October 9	at Redlands*	Redlands Stadium (Note: This stadium is the predecessor to the current Ted Runner Stadium on the University of Redlands campus, which was opened for the 1968 season); Redlands, CA	W 43–10	3,000	
October 16	at Santa Clara*	Buck Shaw Stadium; Santa Clara, CA	L 7–14	9,860	
October 23	Humboldt State	Cox Stadium; San Francisco, CA	W 37–0	2,500	
October 30	at Chico State	College Field; Chico, CA	W 63–20	7,500	
November 6	Nevada	Cox Stadium; San Francisco, CA	W 27–8	4,500	
November 13	at Sacramento State	Charles C. Hughes Stadium; Sacramento, CA	W 3–0	700–720	
November 20	at UC Davis	Toomey Field; Davis, CA	W 35–28	3,300–3,500	
*Non-conference game
