= 1965 San Diego State Aztecs football team =

American college football season

1965 San Diego State Aztecs football
- Conference: California Collegiate Athletic Association
- Record: 8–2 (3–2 CCAA)
- Head coach: Don Coryell (5th season)
- Defensive coordinator: John Madden (2nd season)
- Home stadium: Aztec Bowl, Balboa Stadium

1965 California Collegiate Athletic Association football standings
	Conf.					Overall
Team	W		L		T	W		L		T
No. 4/2 Cal St Los Angeles $	5	–	0	–	0	9	–	1	–	0
No. NR/9 Long Beach State	4	–	1	–	0	9	–	1	–	0
San Diego State	3	–	2	–	0	8	–	2	–	0
Fresno State	1	–	3	–	0	6	–	4	–	0
Cal Poly	1	–	4	–	0	2	–	8	–	0
Valley State	0	–	4	–	0	1	–	9	–	0
$ – Conference champion; Rankings from AP/UPI small college polls

The 1965 San Diego State Aztecs football team represented San Diego State College (Note: San Diego State University was known as San Diego State College from 1935 to 1971.) during the 1965 NCAA College Division football season.

San Diego State competed in the California Collegiate Athletic Association (CCAA). The team was led by head coach Don Coryell, in his fifth year, and played home games at both Aztec Bowl and Balboa Stadium.

The Aztecs were nationally rated as high as number 3 in the AP small college poll, but dropped out of the top 10 after their loss to Cal State Long Beach. They finished the season with eight wins and two losses (8–2, 3–2 CCAA). The offense scored over 40 points in a game six times, totaling 353 points during the season. The defense had five shutouts, giving up only 87 points in 10 games.

== Schedule ==
Date	Opponent	Rank	Site	Result	Attendance	Source
September 18	Pacific (CA)*		Aztec Bowl; San Diego, CA	W 46–6	10,500	
September 25	Akron*		Balboa Stadium; San Diego, CA	W 41–0	29,869	
October 2	Cal Poly	No. 4 AP / 1 UPI	Aztec Bowl; San Diego, CA	W 41–0	12,371	
October 9	Long Beach State	No. 3 AP / 1 UPI	Aztec Bowl; San Diego, CA	L 32–35	16,638	
October 16	at No. 7 AP / 9 UPI Cal State Los Angeles	No. 5 AP / 4 UPI	Rose Bowl; Pasadena, CA	L 12–26	19,546	
October 23	Cal Poly Pomona*^{†}	No. 14 UPI	Aztec Bowl; San Diego, CA	W 41–13	8,500	
October 30	at Fresno State	No. 13 UPI	Ratcliffe Stadium; Fresno, CA (rivalry)	W 26–7	9,009	
November 13	at Valley State	No. 16 UPI	Monroe High; Sepulveda, CA	W 50–0	1,600–4,000	
November 20	at Arizona State–Flagstaff*		Lumberjack Stadium; Flagstaff, AZ	W 20–0	6,500	
November 27	at Cal Western (Note: Alliant International University was formed in 2001 via the merger of United States International University (USIU) and California School of Professional Psychology. USIU had been known as California Western University (Cal Western) from 1952 to 1967.)*		Balboa Stadium; San Diego, CA	W 44–0	3,000	
*Non-conference game; ^{†}Homecoming; Rankings from AP/UPI small college Poll released prior to the game

== Team players in the NFL/AFL ==
The following San Diego State players were selected in the 1966 NFL draft.

Player	Position	Round	Overall	NFL team
Ralph Wenzel	Guard	11	168	Green Bay Packers
Larry Martin	Defensive tackle	13	195	Minnesota Vikings

The following San Diego State players were selected in the 1966 AFL Draft.

Player	Position	Round	Overall	NFL team
Jeff Staggs	Linebaker	3	26	San Diego Chargers
Clifton Kinney	Linebaker	9	80	Oakland Raiders
Houston Ridge	Defensive End - Defensive tackle	13	117	San Diego Chargers

The following finished their San Diego State career in 1965, were not drafted, but played in the NFL/AFL.

Player	Position	First NFL Team
Ray Schmautz	Linebacker	1966 Oakland Raiders

== Team awards ==
Award	Player
Most Valuable Player (John Simcox Memorial Trophy)	Gary Garrison
Outstanding Offensive & Defensive Linemen (Byron H. Chase Memorial Trophy)	Ralph Wenzel
Most Inspirational Player	Ken Madison
