= 1965 Cal State Hayward Pioneers football team =

American college football season

1965 Cal State Hayward Pioneers football
- Conference: Far Western Conference
- Record: 3–7 (0–0 FWC)
- Head coach: Darryl Rogers (1st season)
- Home stadium: Pioneer Stadium

1965 Far Western Conference football standings
	Conf.					Overall
Team	W		L		T	W		L		T
San Francisco State $	5	–	0	–	0	8	–	2	–	0
Nevada	4	–	1	–	0	6	–	4	–	0
UC Davis	3	–	2	–	0	4	–	6	–	0
Humboldt State	2	–	3	–	0	6	–	4	–	0
Sacramento State	1	–	4	–	0	3	–	7	–	0
Chico State	0	–	5	–	0	4	–	6	–	0
Cal State Hayward*	0	–	0	–	0	3	–	7	–	0
$ – Conference champion; * – Games vs. Cal State Hayward did not count as conference games in 1965.

The 1965 Cal State Hayward Pioneers football team represented California State College at Hayward—now known California State University, East Bay—as a member of the Far Western Conference (FWC) during the 1965 NCAA College Division football season. This was the first season that Cal State Hayward fielded a football team. Led by Darryl Rogers in his first and only season as head coach, Cal State Hayward compiled an overall record of 3–7. The team's games against conference opponents did not count the FWC standings. The Cal State Hayward was outscored by its opponents 245 to 62 for the season. The Pioneers played home games at Pioneer Stadium in Hayward, California.

== Schedule ==
Date	Opponent	Site	Result	Attendance	Source
September 18	Pomona*	Pioneer Stadium; Hayward, CA	W 7–0		
September 25	at San Francisco State*	Cox Stadium; San Francisco, CA	L 6–37	3,000	
October 2	Chico State*	Pioneer Stadium; Hayward, CA	L 6–38		
October 9	at Nevada*	Mackay Stadium (Note: This stadium is the predecessor to the current Mackay Stadium, which was opened for the 1966 season.); Reno, NV	L 0–42		
October 16	UC Davis*	Pioneer Stadium; Hayward, CA	L 6–34	1,000	
October 23	at San Francisco*	Kezar Stadium; San Francisco, CA	W 10–0		
October 30	at Cal Poly Pomona*	Kellogg Field; Pomona, CA	L 8–47	3,000	
November 6	at Cal Lutheran*	Mt. Clef Field; Thousand Oaks, CA	L 0–28		
November 13	Moffett Field Air Corps (Note: Naval Air Station Moffett Field was a Naval Air Station from 1933 to 1994.)*	Pioneer Stadium; Hayward, CA	W 8–0		
November 20	Southern Oregon*	Pioneer Stadium; Hayward, CA	L 11–19		
*Non-conference game
