= 1965 Cal State Los Angeles Diablos football team =

American college football season

1965 Cal State Los Angeles Diablos football

CCAA champion

Camellia Bowl, W 18–10 vs. UC Santa Barbara
- Conference: California Collegiate Athletic Association

Ranking
- AP: No. 2 (small college)
- Record: 9–1 (5–0 CCAA)
- Head coach: Homer Beatty (3rd season)
- Home stadium: Rose Bowl

1965 California Collegiate Athletic Association football standings
	Conf.					Overall
Team	W		L		T	W		L		T
No. 4/2 Cal St Los Angeles $	5	–	0	–	0	9	–	1	–	0
No. NR/9 Long Beach State	4	–	1	–	0	9	–	1	–	0
San Diego State	3	–	2	–	0	8	–	2	–	0
Fresno State	1	–	3	–	0	6	–	4	–	0
Cal Poly	1	–	4	–	0	2	–	8	–	0
Valley State	0	–	4	–	0	1	–	9	–	0
$ – Conference champion; Rankings from AP/UPI small college polls

The 1965 Cal State Los Angeles Diablos football team represented California State College at Los Angeles—now known as California State University, Los Angeles—as a member of the California Collegiate Athletic Association (CCAA) during the 1965 NCAA College Division football season. Led by Homer Beatty in his third and final season as head coach, Cal State Los Angeles compiled an overall record of 9–1 with a mark of 5–0 in conference play, winning the CCAA title for the third consecutive season. The team outscored its opponents 264 to 97 for the season. At the end of the regular season, Cal State Los Angeles qualified for the Camellia Bowl, which was the Western Regional Final for the NCAA College Division. The Diablos beat UC Santa Barbara in the game, 18–10. The year-end AP small college football poll had Cal State Los Angeles ranked second. The Diablos played home games at the Rose Bowl in Pasadena, California.

== Schedule ==
Date	Opponent	Rank	Site	Result	Attendance	Source
September 18	at Bowling Green*		University Stadium; Bowling Green, OH	L 0–21	9,474	
September 25	Cal Western*		Rose Bowl; Pasadena, CA	W 35–8	4,850	
October 2	Cal Poly Pomona*	No. 10	Rose Bowl; Pasadena, CA	W 41–0	4,919	
October 16	No. 5 San Diego State	No. 7	Rose Bowl; Pasadena, CA	W 26–12	19,546	
October 23	at No. 8 Fresno State	No. 4	Ratcliffe Stadium; Fresno, CA	W 17–15	13,455	
October 30	at Hawaii*	No. 4	Honolulu Stadium; Honolulu, HI	W 37–7	14,000	
November 6	Cal Poly*^{†}	No. 4	Rose Bowl; Pasadena, CA	W 7–3	4,876	
November 13	at No. 5 Long Beach State	No. 3	Veterans Stadium; Long Beach, CA	W 27–21	18,297	
November 20	Valley State	No. 3	Rose Bowl; Pasadena, CA	W 56–0	1,100–2,774	
December 11	UC Santa Barbara	No. 4	Charles C. Hughes Stadium; Sacramento, CA (Camellia Bowl)	W 18–10	3,500	
*Non-conference game; ^{†}Homecoming; Rankings from AP Poll released prior to the game

== Team players in the NFL/AFL ==
The following Cal State Los Angeles players were selected in the 1966 NFL draft.

Player	Position	Round	Overall	NFL team
Don Davis	Defensive tackle	2	25	New York Giants
George Youngblood	Defensive back	7	97	Los Angeles Rams
Jim Weatherwax	Defensive tackle	11	150	Green Bay Packers
Terry Parks	Tackle	14	202	Los Angeles Rams

The following Cal State Los Angeles players were selected in the 1966 AFL Draft.

Player	Position	Round	Overall	AFL team
Don Davis	Defensive tackle	1	7	San Diego Chargers

The following finished their Cal State Los Angeles career in 1965, were not drafted, but played in the NFL.

Player	Position	First NFL Team
Tom Kennedy	Quarterback	1966 New York Giants
