= La Playa Stadium =

Stadium in Santa Barbara, California

Coordinates: 34°24′15.4″N 119°41′45.8″W

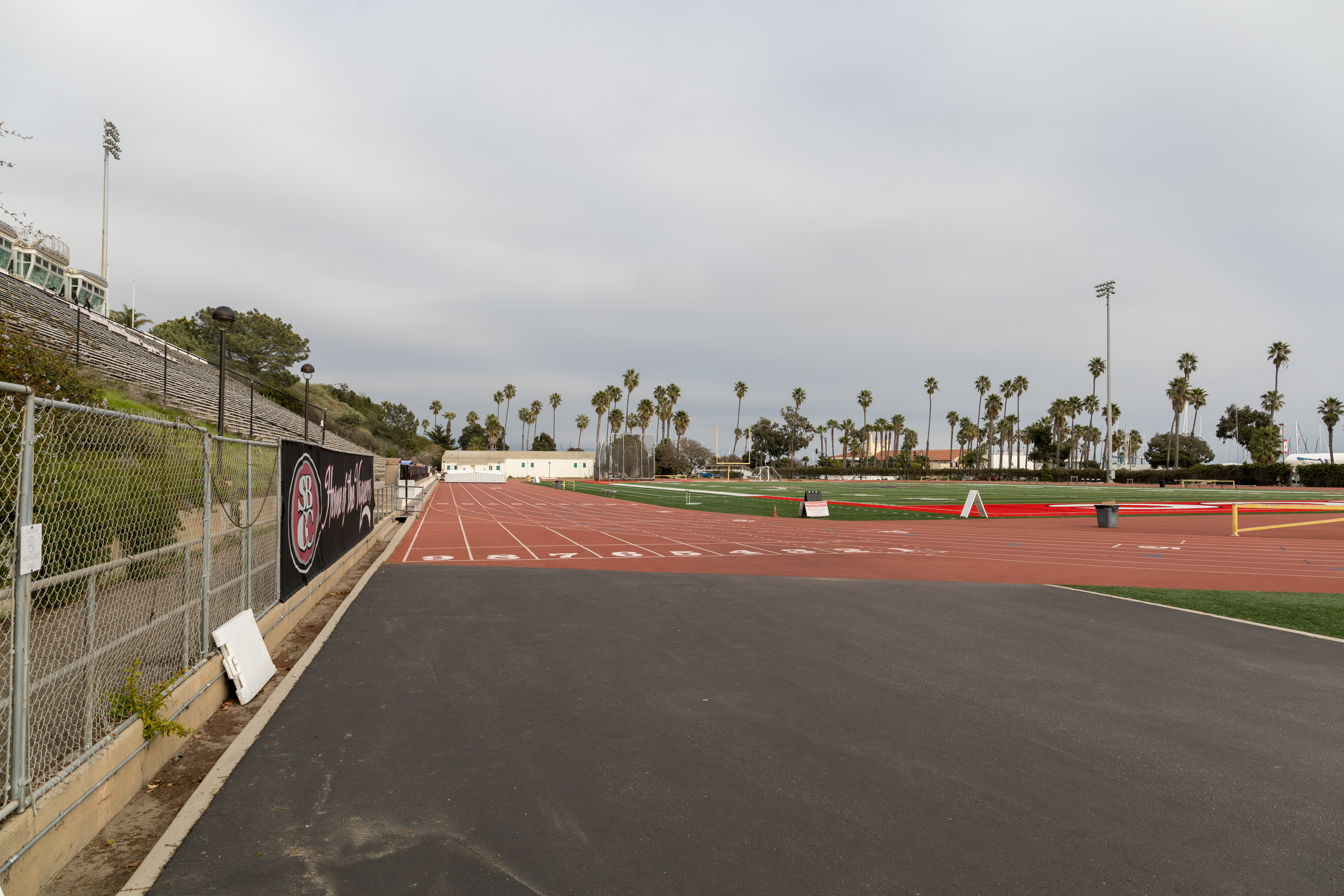
Stadium at sunset

La Playa Stadium is the on-campus stadium for Santa Barbara City College in Santa Barbara, California, United States. The stadium has a capacity of 10,000. The venue serves as the home for the Santa Barbara City College Vaqueros football, soccer and track and field teams. The stadium also serves as the venue for the college's graduation ceremonies.

The stands for the stadium are built into the side of a coastal bluff below the college campus. With no stands on the opposite side, it provides for a clear view of Leadbetter Beach, the Santa Barbara harbor and the Santa Barbara Channel portion of the Pacific Ocean across the street. Because of its proximity to the ocean, the stadium is under the jurisdiction of the California Coastal Commission.

The stadium was also used as the football home stadium for the University of California, Santa Barbara from the days when it was known as Santa Barbara State College starting with the 1938 football season, and served that role until the 1965 season. Many of the Gauchos' games came against nearby rival Cal Poly. UCSB played their last game in the stadium against the Santa Clara University Broncos on October 30, 1965. The home venue was displaced by the on-campus Campus Stadium, which was later renamed Harder Stadium.

La Playa Stadium is also the home of the Santa Barbara Easter Relays, a multi-day track and field carnival. It is the site where John Uelses cleared the first 16-foot pole vault outdoors, on March 31, 1962. See the Video on YouTube.

It is also where Dallas Long set his first of seven world records in the shot put. It was the site of the women's division of the 1967 USA Outdoor Track and Field Championships. Barbara Ferrell equaled the world record in the 100 meters; 11.1 (+0.3), at that championship, which would last until Wyomia Tyus broke it in the Olympic final, at altitude in Mexico City.

Today, the stadium serves host to about five Vaqueros home football games per year, many against nearby rivals Allan Hancock and Ventura and about 20 men and women’s Vaquero soccer games.
