= 1965 Chattanooga Moccasins football team =

American college football season

1965 Chattanooga Moccasins football
- Conference: Independent
- Record: 5–4–1
- Head coach: Scrappy Moore (35th season)
- Home stadium: Chamberlain Field

1965 NCAA College Division independents football records
	Conf.			Overall
Team	W	L	T	W		L		T
Springfield		–		9	–	0	–	0
Ithaca		–		8	–	0	–	0
Parsons		–		8	–	1	–	0
Santa Clara		–		8	–	1	–	0
UC Santa Barbara		–		8	–	2	–	0
Cortland		–		7	–	2	–	0
Wabash		–		7	–	2	–	0
Northeastern		–		6	–	2	–	0
UC Riverside		–		6	–	2	–	0
Tampa		–		6	–	2	–	1
Northern Michigan		–		7	–	3	–	0
Mississippi Valley State		–		6	–	3	–	0
St. Norbert		–		6	–	3	–	0
Rose Poly		–		5	–	3	–	0
Drake		–		6	–	4	–	0
Chattanooga		–		5	–	4	–	1
Arizona State–Flagstaff		–		5	–	4	–	1
Lake Forest		–		4	–	4	–	0
Cal Poly Pomona		–		4	–	5	–	0
Howard (AL)		–		4	–	6	–	0
Portland State		–		4	–	6	–	0
Colorado College		–		3	–	5	–	0
Milwaukee		–		2	–	6	–	0
Southern Illinois		–		2	–	8	–	0
Pacific (CA)		–		2	–	8	–	0
Hawaii		–		1	–	8	–	1
Carnegie Tech		–		1	–	7	–	0
Wheaton (IL)		–		1	–	8	–	0

The 1965 Chattanooga Moccasins football team was an American football team that represented the University of Chattanooga (now known as the University of Tennessee at Chattanooga) during the 1965 NCAA College Division football season. In their 35th year under head coach Scrappy Moore, the team compiled a 5–4–1 record.

== Schedule ==
Date	Opponent	Site	Result	Attendance	Source
September 18	Jacksonville State	Chamberlain Field; Chattanooga, TN	W 14–6	7,200	
September 25	Tennessee Tech	Chamberlain Field; Chattanooga, TN	W 21–0	8,400	
October 2	at East Tennessee State	University Stadium; Johnson City, TN	T 7–7	6,200	
October 9	at Auburn	Cliff Hare Stadium; Auburn, AL	L 7–30	32,160	
October 16	at No. 3 Middle Tennessee	Horace Jones Field; Murfreesboro, TN	L 19–30	10,000	
October 23	Xavier	Chamberlain Field; Chattanooga, TN	W 15–14	7,100–8,000	
October 30	at Houston	Houston Astrodome; Houston, TX	L 7–40	32,320–32,731	
November 6	Southern Miss	Chamberlain Field; Chattanooga, TN	L 0–17	6,400–6,800	
November 14	at Howard (AL)	Seibert Stadium; Homewood, AL	W 25–10	2,000	
November 25	Southwestern Louisiana	Chamberlain Field; Chattanooga, TN	W 27–25	4,500	
Rankings from AP Poll released prior to the game
