= 1965 Springfield Maroons football team =

American college football season

1965 Springfield Maroons football
- Conference: Independent
- Record: 9–0
- Head coach: Ted Dunn (8th season)
- Home stadium: Pratt Field

1965 NCAA College Division independents football records
	Conf.			Overall
Team	W	L	T	W		L		T
Springfield		–		9	–	0	–	0
Ithaca		–		8	–	0	–	0
Parsons		–		8	–	1	–	0
Santa Clara		–		8	–	1	–	0
UC Santa Barbara		–		8	–	2	–	0
Cortland		–		7	–	2	–	0
Wabash		–		7	–	2	–	0
Northeastern		–		6	–	2	–	0
UC Riverside		–		6	–	2	–	0
Tampa		–		6	–	2	–	1
Northern Michigan		–		7	–	3	–	0
Mississippi Valley State		–		6	–	3	–	0
St. Norbert		–		6	–	3	–	0
Rose Poly		–		5	–	3	–	0
Drake		–		6	–	4	–	0
Chattanooga		–		5	–	4	–	1
Arizona State–Flagstaff		–		5	–	4	–	1
Lake Forest		–		4	–	4	–	0
Cal Poly Pomona		–		4	–	5	–	0
Howard (AL)		–		4	–	6	–	0
Portland State		–		4	–	6	–	0
Colorado College		–		3	–	5	–	0
Milwaukee		–		2	–	6	–	0
Southern Illinois		–		2	–	8	–	0
Pacific (CA)		–		2	–	8	–	0
Hawaii		–		1	–	8	–	1
Carnegie Tech		–		1	–	7	–	0
Wheaton (IL)		–		1	–	8	–	0

The 1965 Springfield Maroons football team was an American football team that represented Springfield College in Springfield, Massachusetts, as an independent during the 1965 NCAA College Division football season. In their eighth season under head coach Ted Dunn, the Maroons compiled a 9–0 record and outscored opponents by a total of 242 to 87. It was Springfield's first perfect season since 1893 when the team played only two games.

Key players included halfback Hal Vasvari, quarterback Dave Bennett, linebacker Dave Hughes, end George Wolfort, and placekicker Vince Cutrona.

The team played its home games at Pratt Field in Springfield.

== Schedule ==
Date	Opponent	Site	Result	Attendance	Source
September 11	at Tufts	Ellis Oval; Medford, MA	W 36–0 (scrimmage)		
September 18	Coast Guard	Pratt Field; Springfield, MA	W 30–14	2,589–2,598	
September 25	Amherst	Pratt Field; Springfield, MA	W 13–0	2,000–2,100	
October 2	Williams	Pratt Field; Springfield, MA	W 28–8	2,209	
October 9	at Colby	Waterville, ME	W 42–13	3,000–4,500	
October 16	at Northeastern	Brookline, MA	W 16–14	7,400–7,450	
October 23	American International	Pratt Field; Springfield, MA	W 43–6	3,241	
October 30	at Rhode Island	Meade Stadium; Kingston, RI	W 7–6	4,000	
November 6	New Hampshire^{†}	Pratt Field; Springfield, MA	W 43–13	2,400	
November 13	at Wagner	Grymes Hill, Staten Island, NY	W 20–13	4,500	
^{†}Homecoming
