= Bill Tucker (American football) =

American football player (1942–2015)

No. 45, 34
- Position: Running back

Personal information
- Born: September 14, 1942; Union, South Carolina, U.S.
- Died: November 26, 2015 (aged 73); Snellville, Georgia, U.S.
- Listed height: 6 ft 2 in (1.88 m)
- Listed weight: 219 lb (99 kg)

Career information
- High school: Weir (Weirton, West Virginia)
- College: Tennessee State
- NFL draft: 1967: 3rd round, 65th overall pick

Career history
- San Francisco 49ers (1967–1970); Chicago Bears (1971)

Career NFL statistics
- Rushing attempts-yards: 127-431
- Receptions-yards: 59-496
- Touchdowns: 13
- Stats at Pro Football Reference

William Tucker (September 14, 1942 – November 26, 2015) was an American professional football player who was a running back for five seasons with the San Francisco 49ers and the Chicago Bears of the National Football League (NFL). He played college football for the Tennessee State Tigers. He died of a heart attack in 2015.
