= 1965 Cal Poly Pomona Broncos football team =

American college football season

1965 Cal Poly Pomona Broncos football
- Conference: Independent
- Record: 4–5
- Head coach: Don Warhurst (9th season)
- Home stadium: Kellogg Field

1965 NCAA College Division independents football records
	Conf.			Overall
Team	W	L	T	W		L		T
Springfield		–		9	–	0	–	0
Ithaca		–		8	–	0	–	0
Parsons		–		8	–	1	–	0
Santa Clara		–		8	–	1	–	0
UC Santa Barbara		–		8	–	2	–	0
Cortland		–		7	–	2	–	0
Wabash		–		7	–	2	–	0
Northeastern		–		6	–	2	–	0
UC Riverside		–		6	–	2	–	0
Tampa		–		6	–	2	–	1
Northern Michigan		–		7	–	3	–	0
Mississippi Valley State		–		6	–	3	–	0
St. Norbert		–		6	–	3	–	0
Rose Poly		–		5	–	3	–	0
Drake		–		6	–	4	–	0
Chattanooga		–		5	–	4	–	1
Arizona State–Flagstaff		–		5	–	4	–	1
Lake Forest		–		4	–	4	–	0
Cal Poly Pomona		–		4	–	5	–	0
Howard (AL)		–		4	–	6	–	0
Portland State		–		4	–	6	–	0
Colorado College		–		3	–	5	–	0
Milwaukee		–		2	–	6	–	0
Southern Illinois		–		2	–	8	–	0
Pacific (CA)		–		2	–	8	–	0
Hawaii		–		1	–	8	–	1
Carnegie Tech		–		1	–	7	–	0
Wheaton (IL)		–		1	–	8	–	0

The 1965 Cal Poly Pomona Broncos football team represented the Cal Poly Kellogg-Voorhis Unit—now known as California State Polytechnic University, Pomona—as an independent during the 1965 NCAA College Division football season. Led by ninth-year head coach Don Warhurst, Cal Poly Pomona compiled a record of 4–5. The team was outscored by its opponents 196 to 147 263 for the season. The Broncos played home games at Kellogg Field in Pomona, California.

== Schedule ==
Date	Opponent	Site	Result	Attendance	Source
September 18	Whittier	Kellogg Field; Pomona, CA	W 7–3	2,500	
September 25	Long Beach State	Kellogg Field; Pomona, CA	L 6–33	2,600–3,000	
October 2	at No. 10 Cal State Los Angeles	Rose Bowl; Pasadena, CA	L 0–41	4,919	
October 9	Sacramento State	Kellogg Field; Pomona, CA	W 34–14	2,200–2,500	
October 16	at Arizona State–Flagstaff	Lumberjack Stadium; Flagstaff, AZ	L 7–13	5,000–5,200	
October 23	at San Diego State	Aztec Bowl; San Diego, CA	L 13–41	7,000–8,500	
October 30	Cal State Hayward	Kellogg Field; Pomona, CA	W 47–8	3,000	
November 6	at Valley State	Monroe High School; Sepulveda, CA	W 27–16	2,200–2,450	
November 20	at Santa Clara	Buck Shaw Stadium; Santa Clara, CA	L 6–27	3,700	
Rankings from AP Poll released prior to the game
