= 1965 Hawaii Rainbows football team =

American college football season

1965 Hawaii Rainbows football
- Conference: Independent
- Record: 1–8–1
- Head coach: Clark Shaughnessy (1st season)
- Home stadium: Honolulu Stadium

1965 NCAA College Division independents football records
| | Conf. | | | Overall |
| Team | W | L | T | W | | L | | T |
|---|---|---|---|---|---|---|---|---|
| Springfield | | – | | 9 | – | 0 | – | 0 |
| Ithaca | | – | | 8 | – | 0 | – | 0 |
| Parsons | | – | | 8 | – | 1 | – | 0 |
| Santa Clara | | – | | 8 | – | 1 | – | 0 |
| UC Santa Barbara | | – | | 8 | – | 2 | – | 0 |
| Cortland | | – | | 7 | – | 2 | – | 0 |
| Wabash | | – | | 7 | – | 2 | – | 0 |
| Northeastern | | – | | 6 | – | 2 | – | 0 |
| UC Riverside | | – | | 6 | – | 2 | – | 0 |
| Tampa | | – | | 6 | – | 2 | – | 1 |
| Northern Michigan | | – | | 7 | – | 3 | – | 0 |
| Mississippi Valley State | | – | | 6 | – | 3 | – | 0 |
| St. Norbert | | – | | 6 | – | 3 | – | 0 |
| Rose Poly | | – | | 5 | – | 3 | – | 0 |
| Drake | | – | | 6 | – | 4 | – | 0 |
| Chattanooga | | – | | 5 | – | 4 | – | 1 |
| Arizona State–Flagstaff | | – | | 5 | – | 4 | – | 1 |
| Lake Forest | | – | | 4 | – | 4 | – | 0 |
| Cal Poly Pomona | | – | | 4 | – | 5 | – | 0 |
| Howard (AL) | | – | | 4 | – | 6 | – | 0 |
| Portland State | | – | | 4 | – | 6 | – | 0 |
| Colorado College | | – | | 3 | – | 5 | – | 0 |
| Milwaukee | | – | | 2 | – | 6 | – | 0 |
| Southern Illinois | | – | | 2 | – | 8 | – | 0 |
| Pacific (CA) | | – | | 2 | – | 8 | – | 0 |
| Hawaii | | – | | 1 | – | 8 | – | 1 |
| Carnegie Tech | | – | | 1 | – | 7 | – | 0 |
| Wheaton (IL) | | – | | 1 | – | 8 | – | 0 |

The 1965 Hawaii Rainbows football team represented the University of Hawaiʻi at Mānoa as an independent during the 1965 NCAA College Division football season. In their first season under head coach Clark Shaughnessy, the Rainbows compiled a 1–8–1 record.

== Schedule ==
| Date | Opponent | Site | Result | Attendance | Source |
|---|---|---|---|---|---|
| September 4 | Hawaii Colts | Honolulu Stadium; Honolulu, HI | T 26–26 | 4,006 | |
| September 11 | at Utah State | Romney Stadium; Logan, UT | L 12–31 | 7,000 | |
| September 18 | at Colorado State | Colorado Field; Fort Collins, CO | L 6–54 | 11,700 | |
| September 25 | Humboldt State | Honolulu Stadium; Honolulu, HI | L 6–14 | 5,500 | |
| October 2 | at Pacific (CA) | Pacific Memorial Stadium; Stockton, CA | L 0–21 | 4,000 | |
| October 30 | No. 4 Cal State Los Angeles | Honolulu Stadium; Honolulu, HI | L 7–37 | 14,000 | |
| November 13 | UC Santa Barbara | Honolulu Stadium; Honolulu, HI | L 0–3 | 2,807 | |
| November 20 | Cal Western^{†} | Honolulu Stadium; Honolulu, HI | W 10–8 | | |
| November 27 | Fresno State | Honolulu Stadium; Honolulu, HI (rivalry) | L 3–7 | 2,356 | |
| December 3 | Service Stars | Honolulu Stadium; Honolulu, HI | L 15–26 | 1,807 | |
^{†}Homecoming; Rankings from AP Poll released prior to the game
