= 1965 Arizona State–Flagstaff Lumberjacks football team =

American college football season

1965 Arizona State–Flagstaff Lumberjacks football
- Conference: Independent
- Record: 5–4–1
- Head coach: Andy MacDonald (1st season)
- Home stadium: Lumberjack Stadium

1965 NCAA College Division independents football records
	Conf.			Overall
Team	W	L	T	W		L		T
Springfield		–		9	–	0	–	0
Ithaca		–		8	–	0	–	0
Parsons		–		8	–	1	–	0
Santa Clara		–		8	–	1	–	0
UC Santa Barbara		–		8	–	2	–	0
Cortland		–		7	–	2	–	0
Wabash		–		7	–	2	–	0
Northeastern		–		6	–	2	–	0
UC Riverside		–		6	–	2	–	0
Tampa		–		6	–	2	–	1
Northern Michigan		–		7	–	3	–	0
Mississippi Valley State		–		6	–	3	–	0
St. Norbert		–		6	–	3	–	0
Rose Poly		–		5	–	3	–	0
Drake		–		6	–	4	–	0
Chattanooga		–		5	–	4	–	1
Arizona State–Flagstaff		–		5	–	4	–	1
Lake Forest		–		4	–	4	–	0
Cal Poly Pomona		–		4	–	5	–	0
Howard (AL)		–		4	–	6	–	0
Portland State		–		4	–	6	–	0
Colorado College		–		3	–	5	–	0
Milwaukee		–		2	–	6	–	0
Southern Illinois		–		2	–	8	–	0
Pacific (CA)		–		2	–	8	–	0
Hawaii		–		1	–	8	–	1
Carnegie Tech		–		1	–	7	–	0
Wheaton (IL)		–		1	–	8	–	0

The 1965 Arizona State–Flagstaff Lumberjacks football team was an American football team that represented Arizona State College at Flagstaff (now known as Northern Arizona University) as an independent during the 1965 NCAA College Division football season. In their first year under head coach Andy MacDonald, the Lumberjacks compiled a 5–4–1 record and outscored opponents by a total of 196 to 106.

The team played its home games at Lumberjack Stadium in Flagstaff, Arizona.

== Schedule ==
Date	Opponent	Site	Result	Attendance	Source
September 18	at Weber State	Wildcat Stadium; Ogden, UT	L 14–21	3,742	
September 25	Whittier	Lumberjack Stadium; Flagstaff, AZ	L 2–3	4,500	
October 2	at Adams State	Alamosa, CO	W 56–0	4,900	
October 8	Idaho State^{†}	Lumberjack Stadium; Flagstaff, AZ	T 0–0	6,200	
October 16	Cal Poly Pomona	Lumberjack Stadium; Flagstaff, AZ	W 13–7	5,000–5,200	
October 23	at Colorado State–Greeley	Jackson Field; Greeley, CO	W 23–0	6,000	
October 30	at Arlington State	Memorial Stadium; Arlington, TX	L 6–27	9,900	
November 6	at Fort Lewis	Durango, CO	W 41–14	3,300	
November 13	Eastern New Mexico	Lumberjack Stadium; Flagstaff, AZ	W 41–14	4,200	
November 20	San Diego State	Lumberjack Stadium; Flagstaff, AZ	L 0–20	6,200–6,500	
^{†}Homecoming
