= 1965 Tampa Spartans football team =

American college football season

1965 Tampa Spartans football
- Conference: Independent
- Record: 6–2–1
- Head coach: Sam Bailey (2nd season)
- Home stadium: Phillips Field

1965 NCAA College Division independents football records
	Conf.			Overall
Team	W	L	T	W		L		T
Springfield		–		9	–	0	–	0
Ithaca		–		8	–	0	–	0
Parsons		–		8	–	1	–	0
Santa Clara		–		8	–	1	–	0
UC Santa Barbara		–		8	–	2	–	0
Cortland		–		7	–	2	–	0
Wabash		–		7	–	2	–	0
Northeastern		–		6	–	2	–	0
UC Riverside		–		6	–	2	–	0
Tampa		–		6	–	2	–	1
Northern Michigan		–		7	–	3	–	0
Mississippi Valley State		–		6	–	3	–	0
St. Norbert		–		6	–	3	–	0
Rose Poly		–		5	–	3	–	0
Drake		–		6	–	4	–	0
Chattanooga		–		5	–	4	–	1
Arizona State–Flagstaff		–		5	–	4	–	1
Lake Forest		–		4	–	4	–	0
Cal Poly Pomona		–		4	–	5	–	0
Howard (AL)		–		4	–	6	–	0
Portland State		–		4	–	6	–	0
Colorado College		–		3	–	5	–	0
Milwaukee		–		2	–	6	–	0
Southern Illinois		–		2	–	8	–	0
Pacific (CA)		–		2	–	8	–	0
Hawaii		–		1	–	8	–	1
Carnegie Tech		–		1	–	7	–	0
Wheaton (IL)		–		1	–	8	–	0

The 1965 Tampa Spartans football team represented the University of Tampa in the 1965 NCAA College Division football season. It was the Spartans' 29th season. The team was led by head coach Sam Bailey, in his second year, and played their home games at Phillips Field in Tampa, Florida. They finished with a record of six wins, two losses and one tie (6–2–1).

== Schedule ==
Date	Opponent	Site	Result	Attendance	Source
September 18	at McNeese State	Cowboy Stadium; Lake Charles, LA	W 16–12	11,000	
September 25	at Buffalo	Rotary Field; Buffalo, NY	T 13–13	8,016	
October 2	at Mississippi State	Scott Field; Starkville, MS	L 7–48	17,000	
October 9	North Texas State	Phillips Field; Tampa, FL	W 17–14	8,000	
October 16	Southwestern Louisiana	Phillips Field; Tampa, FL	W 7–6	10,400	
October 23	Delta State	Phillips Field; Tampa, FL	L 32–33	8,700	
October 30	Jacksonville State	Phillips Field; Tampa, FL	W 30–11	6,000	
November 13	No. 2 Maine	Phillips Field; Tampa, FL	W 2–0	11,000	
November 20	Northern Michigan	Phillips Field; Tampa, FL	W 19–7	6,000	
Rankings from AP Poll released prior to the game
