= 1965 UC Santa Barbara Gauchos football team =

American college football season

1965 UC Santa Barbara Gauchos football

Camellia Bowl, L 10–18 vs. Cal State Los Angeles
- Conference: Independent
- Record: 8–2
- Head coach: Jack Curtice (3rd season)
- Home stadium: La Playa Stadium

1965 NCAA College Division independents football records
	Conf.			Overall
Team	W	L	T	W		L		T
Springfield		–		9	–	0	–	0
Ithaca		–		8	–	0	–	0
Parsons		–		8	–	1	–	0
Santa Clara		–		8	–	1	–	0
UC Santa Barbara		–		8	–	2	–	0
Cortland		–		7	–	2	–	0
Wabash		–		7	–	2	–	0
Northeastern		–		6	–	2	–	0
UC Riverside		–		6	–	2	–	0
Tampa		–		6	–	2	–	1
Northern Michigan		–		7	–	3	–	0
Mississippi Valley State		–		6	–	3	–	0
St. Norbert		–		6	–	3	–	0
Rose Poly		–		5	–	3	–	0
Drake		–		6	–	4	–	0
Chattanooga		–		5	–	4	–	1
Arizona State–Flagstaff		–		5	–	4	–	1
Lake Forest		–		4	–	4	–	0
Cal Poly Pomona		–		4	–	5	–	0
Howard (AL)		–		4	–	6	–	0
Portland State		–		4	–	6	–	0
Colorado College		–		3	–	5	–	0
Milwaukee		–		2	–	6	–	0
Southern Illinois		–		2	–	8	–	0
Pacific (CA)		–		2	–	8	–	0
Hawaii		–		1	–	8	–	1
Carnegie Tech		–		1	–	7	–	0
Wheaton (IL)		–		1	–	8	–	0

The 1965 UC Santa Barbara Gauchos football team represented the University of California, Santa Barbara (UCSB) as an independent during the 1965 NCAA College Division football season. Led by third-year head coach Jack Curtice, the Gauchos compiled a record of 8–2 and outscored their opponents 225 to 195. UC Santa Barbara was invited to the Camellia Bowl, where the Gauchos lost to Cal State Los Angeles. The team played home games at La Playa Stadium in Santa Barbara, California.

Curtice won the AFCA Coach of the Year Award for the NCAA College Division.

== Schedule ==
Date	Opponent	Site	Result	Attendance	Source
September 18	at Valley State	Monroe High School; Sepulveda, CA	W 20–0	7,800–8,000	
September 25	at Redlands	Redlands Stadium (Note: This stadium is the predecessor to the current Ted Runner Stadium on the University of Redlands campus, which was opened for the 1968 season); Redlands, CA	W 47–0	2,300	
October 2	at Nevada	Mackay Stadium (Note: This stadium is the predecessor to the current Mackay Stadium, which was opened for the 1966 season.); Reno, NV	W 21–18	3,500	
October 9	UC Davis	La Playa Stadium; Santa Barbara, CA	W 34–6	5,000–5,200	
October 16	Long Beach State	La Playa Stadium; Santa Barbara, CA	L 7–28	9,800	
October 30	Santa Clara	La Playa Stadium; Santa Barbara, CA	W 14–13	9,000	
November 6	Cal Western (Note: Alliant International University was formed in 2001 via the merger of United States International University (USIU) and California School of Professional Psychology. USIU had been known as California Western University (Cal Western) from 1952 to 1967.)	La Playa Stadium; Santa Barbara, CA	W 34–6	5,100	
November 13	at Hawaii	Honolulu Stadium; Honolulu, HI	W 3–0	2,700–2,807	
November 20	at Cal Poly	Mustang Stadium; San Luis Obispo, CA	W 35–6	5,500	
December 11	vs. No. 4 Cal State Los Angeles	Charles C. Hughes Stadium; Sacramento, CA (Camellia Bowl)	L 10–18	3,500	
Rankings from AP Poll released prior to the game

== Team players in the NFL ==
No Santa Barbara Gaucho players were selected in the 1966 NFL draft.

The following finished their UC Santa Barbara career in 1965, were not drafted, but played in the NFL/AFL.

Player	Position	First AFL team
Jason Franci	Wide receiver	1966 Denver Broncos
