= 1965 UC Riverside Highlanders football team =

American college football season

1965 UC Riverside Highlanders football
- Conference: Independent
- Record: 6–2
- Head coach: Pete Kettela (1st season)
- Home stadium: Highlander Stadium

1965 NCAA College Division independents football records
	Conf.			Overall
Team	W	L	T	W		L		T
Springfield		–		9	–	0	–	0
Ithaca		–		8	–	0	–	0
Parsons		–		8	–	1	–	0
Santa Clara		–		8	–	1	–	0
UC Santa Barbara		–		8	–	2	–	0
Cortland		–		7	–	2	–	0
Wabash		–		7	–	2	–	0
Northeastern		–		6	–	2	–	0
UC Riverside		–		6	–	2	–	0
Tampa		–		6	–	2	–	1
Northern Michigan		–		7	–	3	–	0
Mississippi Valley State		–		6	–	3	–	0
St. Norbert		–		6	–	3	–	0
Rose Poly		–		5	–	3	–	0
Drake		–		6	–	4	–	0
Chattanooga		–		5	–	4	–	1
Arizona State–Flagstaff		–		5	–	4	–	1
Lake Forest		–		4	–	4	–	0
Cal Poly Pomona		–		4	–	5	–	0
Howard (AL)		–		4	–	6	–	0
Portland State		–		4	–	6	–	0
Colorado College		–		3	–	5	–	0
Milwaukee		–		2	–	6	–	0
Southern Illinois		–		2	–	8	–	0
Pacific (CA)		–		2	–	8	–	0
Hawaii		–		1	–	8	–	1
Carnegie Tech		–		1	–	7	–	0
Wheaton (IL)		–		1	–	8	–	0

The 1965 UC Riverside Highlanders football team represented the University of California, Riverside as an independent during the 1965 NCAA College Division football season. Led by first-year head coach Pete Kettela, UC Riverside compiled a record of 6–2. The team was outscored by its opponents 189 to 183 for the season. The Highlanders played home games at Highlander Stadium in Riverside, California.

== Schedule ==
Date	Opponent	Site	Result	Attendance	Source
September 25	UC Davis	Highlander Stadium; Riverside, CA	W 16–14	1,800–2,200	
October 2	La Verne	Highlander Stadium; Riverside, CA	L 16–45	750	
October 16	Redlands	Highlander Stadium; Riverside, CA	W 24–21	2,100	
October 23	at Claremont-Mudd	Fritz B. Burns Stadium; Claremont, CA	W 16–10	800	
October 30	at Pomona	Claremont Alumni Field; Claremont, CA	W 23–20	1,500	
November 5	at Caltech	Rose Bowl; Pasadena, CA	W 40–7	750	
November 13	Azusa Pacific	Highlander Stadium; Riverside, CA	W 34–20	3,000	
November 20	Cal Lutheran	Highlander Stadium; Riverside, CA	L 20–46		
