= 1965 Ithaca Bombers football team =

American college football season

1965 Ithaca Bombers football
- Conference: Independent
- Record: 8–0
- Head coach: Richard S. Lyon (8th season)
- Captain: Larry Turel
- Home stadium: South Hill Field

1965 NCAA College Division independents football records
	Conf.			Overall
Team	W	L	T	W		L		T
Springfield		–		9	–	0	–	0
Ithaca		–		8	–	0	–	0
Parsons		–		8	–	1	–	0
Santa Clara		–		8	–	1	–	0
UC Santa Barbara		–		8	–	2	–	0
Cortland		–		7	–	2	–	0
Wabash		–		7	–	2	–	0
Northeastern		–		6	–	2	–	0
UC Riverside		–		6	–	2	–	0
Tampa		–		6	–	2	–	1
Northern Michigan		–		7	–	3	–	0
Mississippi Valley State		–		6	–	3	–	0
St. Norbert		–		6	–	3	–	0
Rose Poly		–		5	–	3	–	0
Drake		–		6	–	4	–	0
Chattanooga		–		5	–	4	–	1
Arizona State–Flagstaff		–		5	–	4	–	1
Lake Forest		–		4	–	4	–	0
Cal Poly Pomona		–		4	–	5	–	0
Howard (AL)		–		4	–	6	–	0
Portland State		–		4	–	6	–	0
Colorado College		–		3	–	5	–	0
Milwaukee		–		2	–	6	–	0
Southern Illinois		–		2	–	8	–	0
Pacific (CA)		–		2	–	8	–	0
Hawaii		–		1	–	8	–	1
Carnegie Tech		–		1	–	7	–	0
Wheaton (IL)		–		1	–	8	–	0

The 1965 Ithaca Bombers football team was an American football team that represented Ithaca College as an independent during the 1965 NCAA College Division football season. In their eighth season under head coach Richard S. Lyon, the Bombers compiled an 8–0 record and outscored opponents by a total of 204 to 76. It was the first, and remains the only, perfect season in Ithaca football history.

Statistically, the team ran a balanced offense, totaling 1,400 rushing yards and 1,354 passing yards. Quarterback Jim Harris broke the school's single-season record with 1,269 passing yards. He completed 89 of 153 passes for a .585 completion percentage with nine touchdown passes and nine interceptions. Frank Fazio led the team with 30 pass receptions for 448 yards; Fazio also led the team in scoring with 60 points on seven touchdowns, 16 point-after-touchdown kicks, and a two-point conversion. Senior halfback Bob Glazier was the rushing leader with 93 carries for 459 yards (an average of 4.9 yards per carry).

After the season, the following team awards were presented:

- Honorary co-captains - Jim Harris and tackle Len Tyler (Larry Turel was the team captain throughout the 1965 season; Harris and Tyler were selected as "honorary" captains at the end of the season)
- Most outstanding defensive player - halfback Rene VanCauwenberge
- Most outstanding offensive player - Jim Harris
- Whistleman (hustle) of the year - end Bob Congdon
- Rookie of the year - back John Neyenhouse
- Marauder of the year - halfback Bill Erven

The team was inducted into the Ithaca College Athletic Hall of Fame in 2015. Coach Lyon has also been inducted individually, along with three players from the team: Fazio, Harris, and Leonard Tyler.

The team played its home games at South Hill Field in Ithaca, New York.

== Schedule ==
Date	Time	Opponent	Site	Result	Attendance	Source
September 18		at Clarion	Clarion State College Stadium; Clarion, PA	W 7–0	3,600–3,800	
September 25		Southern Connecticut	South Hill Field; Ithaca, NY	W 28–25	2,000–2,500	
October 2	8:00 p.m.	at Montclair State	Clifton High School Stadium; Clifton, NJ	W 19–14	3,500–4,366	
October 9		Cortland State	South Hill Field; Ithaca, NY	W 13–12	3,000	
October 16		at Susquehanna	Selinsgrove, PA	W 34–6	4,500–6,000	
October 23		C. W. Post	South Hill Field; Ithaca, NY	W 39–6	1,500–2,500	
October 30		at Bridgeport	Bridgeport, CT	W 14–7	5,000	
November 6		American International	South Hill Field; Ithaca, NY	W 50–6	2,500	
All times are in Eastern time
