= 1965 Carnegie Tech Tartans football team =

American college football season

1965 Carnegie Tech Tartans football
- Conference: Independent
- Record: 1–7
- Head coach: Joe Gasparella (4th season)

1965 NCAA College Division independents football records
	Conf.			Overall
Team	W	L	T	W		L		T
Springfield		–		9	–	0	–	0
Ithaca		–		8	–	0	–	0
Parsons		–		8	–	1	–	0
Santa Clara		–		8	–	1	–	0
UC Santa Barbara		–		8	–	2	–	0
Cortland		–		7	–	2	–	0
Wabash		–		7	–	2	–	0
Northeastern		–		6	–	2	–	0
UC Riverside		–		6	–	2	–	0
Tampa		–		6	–	2	–	1
Northern Michigan		–		7	–	3	–	0
Mississippi Valley State		–		6	–	3	–	0
St. Norbert		–		6	–	3	–	0
Rose Poly		–		5	–	3	–	0
Drake		–		6	–	4	–	0
Chattanooga		–		5	–	4	–	1
Arizona State–Flagstaff		–		5	–	4	–	1
Lake Forest		–		4	–	4	–	0
Cal Poly Pomona		–		4	–	5	–	0
Howard (AL)		–		4	–	6	–	0
Portland State		–		4	–	6	–	0
Colorado College		–		3	–	5	–	0
Milwaukee		–		2	–	6	–	0
Southern Illinois		–		2	–	8	–	0
Pacific (CA)		–		2	–	8	–	0
Hawaii		–		1	–	8	–	1
Carnegie Tech		–		1	–	7	–	0
Wheaton (IL)		–		1	–	8	–	0

The 1965 Carnegie Tech Tartans football team represented the Carnegie Institute of Technology—now known as Carnegie Mellon University—as an independent during the 1965 NCAA College Division football season. Led by fourth-year head coach Joe Gasparella the Tartans compiled a record of 1–7.

== Schedule ==
Date	Opponent	Site	Result	Attendance	Source
September 25	at Wooster	Wooster, OH	L 15–21		
October 2	at Case Tech	Cleveland, OH	L 16–21		
October 9	Allegheny	Pittsburgh, PA	W 27–6		
October 16	at Grove City	Grove City, PA	L 0–28	6500	
October 23	Franklin & Marshall	Pittsburgh, PA	L 24–27		
October 30	at Denison	Granville, OH	L 13–43		
November 6	Westminster (PA)	Pittsburgh, PA	L 21–28		
November 13	Washington & Jefferson	Pittsburgh, PA	L 14–21	3500	
