= 1965 small college football rankings =

- Selectors: AP, UPI
- No. 1: North Dakota State
- Small college football rankings (AP, UPI)
- «1964 1966»

The 1965 small college football rankings are rankings of college football teams representing smaller college and university teams during the 1965 college football season, including the 1965 NCAA College Division football season and the 1965 NAIA football season. Separate rankings were published by the Associated Press (AP) and the United Press International (UPI). The AP rankings were selected by a board of sports writers, and the UPI rankings were selected by a board of small-college coaches.

The 1965 North Dakota State Bison football team (11–0) was rated as the small-college champion by both the AP and UPI. Middle Tennessee State (10–0) was rated No. 2 by the AP and No. 3 by the UPI.

== Legend ==
	Increase in ranking
	Decrease in ranking
	Not ranked previous week
(#–#)	Win–loss record
(Italics)	Number of first place votes
т	Tied with team above or below also with this symbol

== AP poll ==
	Week 1 Sept 30	Week 2 Oct 7	Week 3 Oct 14	Week 4 Oct 21	Week 5 Oct 28	Week 6 Nov 4	Week 7 Nov 11	Week 8 Nov 18	Week 9 Nov 25	
1.	North Dakota State (3–0) (2)	North Dakota State (4–0) (5)	North Dakota State (5–0) (9)	North Dakota State (6–0) (7)	North Dakota State (7–0) (6)	North Dakota State (8–0) (7)	North Dakota State (9–0) (6)	North Dakota State (10–0) (7)	North Dakota State (10–0) (4)	1.
2.	Florida A&M (2–0)	Florida A&M (2–0) (3)	Florida A&M (3–0) (1)	Florida A&M (4–0) (1)	Maine (6–0)	Maine (7–0)	Maine (8–0)	Middle Tennessee (9–0) (3)	Middle Tennessee (9–0) (2)	2.
3.	Wittenberg (1–0) (1)	San Diego State (3–0) (4)	Middle Tennessee (4–0) (1)	Maine (5–0)	Middle Tennessee (6–0) (1)	Middle Tennessee (7–0) (1)	Cal State Los Angeles (6–1) (1)	Cal State Los Angeles (7–1) (2)	Sul Ross (10–0) (1)	3.
4.	San Diego State (2–0) (2)	Northern Michigan (4–0) (1)	Maine (4–0)	Cal State Los Angeles (3–1) (2)	Cal State Los Angeles (4–1) (2)	Cal State Los Angeles (5–1) (1)	Middle Tennessee (8–0) (1)	Northern Illinois (9–0)	Cal State Los Angeles (8–1)	4.
5.	Kentucky State (2–0) (1)	Middle Tennessee (3–0)	San Diego State (3–1)	Middle Tennessee (5–0) (1)	Long Beach State (6–0) (1)	Long Beach State (7–0) (1)	Long Beach State (8–0) (1)	East Carolina (7–1) (1)	Tennessee State (8–0)	5.
6.	Northern Michigan (3–0)	Maine (3–0)	Kentucky State (3–0) (1)	Hofstra (5–0)	Western State (CO) (6–0) (1)	Tennessee State (5–0)	East Carolina (6–1) (1)	Maine (8–1)	Northern Illinois (9–0)	6.
7.	Louisiana Tech (0–1) (1)	Cal State Los Angeles (2–1) (1)	Cal State Los Angeles (2–1) (1)	Lamar Tech (5–0)	Florida A&M (4–1) (1)	Northern Illinois (7–0)	Tennessee State (6–0)	Tennessee State (7–0)	Maine (8–1)	7.
8.	East Carolina (1–0)	Kentucky State (3–0) (1)	Hofstra (4–0)	Fresno State (3–1)	Northern Illinois (6–0)	Western State (CO) (6–1)	Northern Illinois (8–0)	Sul Ross (9–0) (1)	East Carolina (8–1) (1)	8.
9.	Middle Tennessee (2–0)	Wittenberg (1–1)	North Dakota (5–0)	Western State (CO) (5–0) (1) (Note: In the actual printed polls, Western State was listed as Western Colorado)	Tennessee State (4–0)	Florida A&M (4–1)	North Dakota (8–1)	Long Beach State (8–1)	St. John's (MN) (9–0)	9.
10.	Cal State Los Angeles (1–1) (Note: In the actual printed polls, Cal State Los Angeles was listed as Los Angeles State)	Arkansas State (3–0)	Lamar Tech (4–0)	Long Beach State (5–0) (1)	Lamar Tech (5–1)	East Carolina (5–1)	Western State (CO) (7–1)	Ball State (9–0) (1)	East Stroudsburg (9–0)	10.
	Week 1 Sept 30	Week 2 Oct 7	Week 3 Oct 14	Week 4 Oct 21	Week 5 Oct 28	Week 6 Nov 4	Week 7 Nov 11	Week 8 Nov 18	Week 9 Nov 25	
		Dropped: 7 Louisiana Tech; 8 East Carolina	Dropped: 4 Northern Michigan; 9 Wittenberg; 10 Arkansas State	Dropped: 5 San Diego State; 6 Kentucky State; 9 North Dakota	Dropped: 6 Hofstra; 8 Fresno State	Dropped: 10 Lamar Tech	Dropped: 9 Florida A&M; 10 North Carolina	Dropped: 9 North Dakota; 10 Western State (CO)	Dropped: 9 Long Beach State; 10 Ball State	

== UPI coaches poll ==
	Week 1 Sept 30	Week 2 Oct 7	Week 3 Oct 14	Week 4 Oct 21	Week 5 Oct 28	Week 6 Nov 4	Week 7 Nov 11	Week 8 Nov 18	Week 9 Nov 25	Week 10 Dec 2	
1.	San Diego State (2–0) (10)	San Diego State (3–0)	North Dakota State (5–0) (12)	North Dakota State (6–0) (16)	North Dakota State (7–0) (12)	North Dakota State (8–0)	North Dakota State (9–0) (16)	North Dakota State (10–0) (15)	North Dakota State (10–0) (18)	North Dakota State (10–0) (21)	1.
2.	North Dakota State (3–0) т	North Dakota State (4–0)	Maine (4–0) (2)	Maine (5–0) (5)	Maine (6–0) (11)	Maine (7–0)	Maine (8–0) (7)	Cal State Los Angeles (7–1) (4)	Cal State Los Angeles (8–1) (6)	Cal State Los Angeles (8–1) (2)	2.
3.	East Carolina (1–0) т	Florida A&M (2–0)	Florida A&M (3–0) (3)	Florida A&M (4–0) (2)	Cal State Los Angeles (4–1)	Cal State Los Angeles (5–1)	Cal State Los Angeles (6–1) (1)	East Carolina (7–1) (1)	East Carolina (8–1) (1)	Middle Tennessee (10–0) (3)	3.
4.	Florida A&M (2–0)	Maine (3–0)	San Diego State (3–1) (5)	Western State (CO) (5–0) (1)	East Carolina (4–1)	East Carolina (5–1)	East Carolina (6–1)	Northern Illinois (9–0) (1)	Northern Illinois (9–0)	East Carolina (8–1) (1)	4.
5.	Montana State (4)	Northeastern State	Western State (CO) (4–0) (1)	Hofstra (5–0) (1)	Western State (CO) (6–0)	Long Beach State (7–0)	Long Beach State (8–0) (3)	Middle Tennessee (9–0) (3)	Middle Tennessee (9–0) (3)	Weber State (8–1) (3)	5.
6.	Wittenberg (1–0)	Western State (CO)	Hofstra (4–0)	Cal State Los Angeles (3–1)	Middle Tennessee (6–0)	Middle Tennessee (7–0)	Northern Illinois (8–0) (2)	Maine (8–1) (3)	Sul Ross (10–0)	Maine (8–1)	6.
7.	Maine	Hofstra	Fresno State (2–1) (2)	East Carolina (3–1)	Long Beach State (6–0)	Northern Illinois (7–0)	Middle Tennessee (8–0) (2)	Sul Ross (9–0) (1)	Weber State (8–1) (3)	Northern Illinois (9–0)	7.
8.	Western State (CO)	North Dakota	North Dakota (5–0)	Fresno State (3–1) (1)	Northern Illinois (6–0)	Sul Ross (7–0)	Sul Ross (8–0) (1)	Weber State (8–1) (4)	Maine (8–1)	North Dakota (8–1) (1)	8.
9.	Chattanooga	Cal State Los Angeles (2–1)	Cal State Los Angeles (2–1) (1)	Middle Tennessee (5–0) (3)	Sul Ross (6–0)	Weber State (6–1) т	Weber State (7–1) (3)	Long Beach State (8–1)	North Dakota (8–1)	Long Beach State (9–1)	9.
10.	Northeastern State т (Note: In the actual printed polls, Northeastern State was listed as Northeast Oklahoma)	Fresno State	East Carolina (2–1)	Long Beach State (5–0) (1)	Florida A&M (4–1)	North Dakota (7–1) т	UMass (6–2)	North Dakota (8–1)	Long Beach State (9–1)	Sul Ross (10–0)	10.
11.	Hofstra т	East Carolina	Middle Tennessee (4–0)	Northern Illinois	North Dakota	San Diego State	North Dakota (8–1)	UMass	St. John's (MN) (9–0) (1)	St. John's (MN) (9–0) (1)	11.
12.	Cal State Los Angeles (1–1)	Montana State	Long Beach State (2)	North Dakota	Findlay т	UMass т	Arkansas State	St. John's (MN)	UMass	Tennessee State	12.
13.	UMass (Note: In the actual printed polls, UMass was listed as Massachusetts)	Middle Tennessee (3–0)	Northern Illinois	Lamar Tech (5–0)	San Diego State т	Arkansas State т	Western State (CO) (7–1)	Western State (CO)	Tampa (1)	Grambling State т	13.
14.	Concordia (MN) т	Northern Michigan (4–0)	Northeastern State	San Diego State (1)	Arkansas State	Western State (CO) (6–1)	Tennessee State (6–0)	East Central Oklahoma	Western State (CO)	Linfield т	14.
15.	North Dakota т	Chattanooga	Concordia (MN)	Northeastern State	UMass т	Eastern Washington	St. John's (MN)	Tennessee State (7–0)	East Central Oklahoma (1)	UMass (1)	15.
16.	Louisiana Tech (0–1)	Louisiana Tech	Lamar Tech (4–0)	Arkansas State	Hofstra т	Florida A&M (4–1)	Florida A&M т	Florida A&M	UC Santa Barbara	UC Santa Barbara	16.
17.	Northern Michigan (3–0)	Arkansas State (3–0)	St. Norbert	Sul Ross	Tennessee State (4–0)	Austin Peay	San Diego State т	Tampa	Florida A&M	Ball State	17.
18.	Arkansas State	Concordia (MN)	Bucknell	East Stroudsburg	Weber State	Findlay	East Central Oklahoma State	Parsons	Parsons	East Stroudsburg	18.
19.	Fresno State	Northern Illinois	UMass	Concordia (MN)	Eastern Washington	Tennessee State (5–0) т	Omaha	Austin Peay	Tennessee State (8–0)	Western State (CO)	19.
20.	Middle Tennessee (2–0)	Weber State	Arkansas State	Eastern Washington т	Fresno State	Central State (OK) т	Ball State т	Omaha	Austin Peay т	East Central Oklahoma (1)	20.
21.				UMass т			Northeastern State т		Ball State т		21.
22.				Tampa							22.
	Week 1 Sept 30	Week 2 Oct 7	Week 3 Oct 14	Week 4 Oct 21	Week 5 Oct 28	Week 6 Nov 4	Week 7 Nov 11	Week 8 Nov 18	Week 9 Nov 25	Week 10 Dec 2	
		Dropped: 6 Wittenberg; 13 UMass	Dropped: 12 Montana State; 14 Northern Michigan; 15 Chattanooga; 16 Louisiana Tech; 20 Weber State	Dropped: 17 St. Norbert; 18 Bucknell	Dropped: 13 Lamar Tech; 15 Northeastern State; 18 East Stroudsburg; 19 Concordia (MN); 20 Tampa	Dropped: 16 Hofstra; 20 Fresno State	Dropped: 15 Eastern Washington; 17 Austin Peay; 18 Findlay; 20 Central State (OK)	Dropped: 12 Arkansas State; 17 San Diego State; 20 Ball State; 20 Northeastern State	Dropped: 20 Omaha	Dropped: 13 Tampa; 17 Florida A&M; 18 Parsons; 20 Austin Peay	

== Pittsburgh Courier rankings ==
The Pittsburgh Courier, a leading African American newspaper, ranked the top 1965 teams from historically black colleges and universities in an era when college football was often racially segregated.

The rankings were published on December 4:

1. Tennessee A&I (9–0–1)
2. Morgan State (8–0)
3. Florida A&M (7–1)
4. South Carolina State (8–1)
5. Grambling (8–3)
6. Langston (6–2)
7. Maryland State (6–2)
8. Allen (6–2)
9. Bethune–Cookman (5–2–1)
