= 1965 NCAA College Division football season =

American college football season

- Champion(s): North Dakota State (AP, UPI); Tennessee A&I (black)

The 1965 NCAA College Division football season was the tenth season of college football in the United States organized by the National Collegiate Athletic Association at the NCAA College Division level.

== Conference realignment ==
=== Membership changes ===
Team	1964 conference	1965 conference
Portland State	Oregon (NAIA)	Independent

== Conference standings ==
1965 Big Sky Conference football standings
	Conf.					Overall
Team	W		L		T	W		L		T
Weber State +	3	–	1	–	0	8	–	1	–	0
Idaho +	3	–	1	–	0	5	–	5	–	0
Montana	2	–	2	–	0	4	–	6	–	0
Idaho State	1	–	3	–	0	3	–	5	–	1
Montana State	1	–	3	–	0	3	–	7	–	0
+ – Conference co-champions

1965 California Collegiate Athletic Association football standings
	Conf.					Overall
Team	W		L		T	W		L		T
No. 4/2 Cal St Los Angeles $	5	–	0	–	0	9	–	1	–	0
No. NR/9 Long Beach State	4	–	1	–	0	9	–	1	–	0
San Diego State	3	–	2	–	0	8	–	2	–	0
Fresno State	1	–	3	–	0	6	–	4	–	0
Cal Poly	1	–	4	–	0	2	–	8	–	0
Valley State	0	–	4	–	0	1	–	9	–	0
$ – Conference champion; Rankings from AP/UPI small college polls

1965 Central Intercollegiate Athletic Association football standings
	Conf.					Overall
Team	W		L		T	W		L		T
No. 3 Morgan State $	8	–	0	–	0	9	–	0	–	0
Johnson C. Smith	5	–	1	–	0	5	–	4	–	0
Maryland State	5	–	1	–	0	5	–	2	–	0
St. Augustine's	6	–	1	–	1	8	–	1	–	1
North Carolina A&T	4	–	3	–	0	4	–	6	–	0
Delaware State	3	–	3	–	0	4	–	5	–	0
Virginia State	5	–	4	–	0	5	–	4	–	0
Saint Paul's (VA)	4	–	3	–	0	5	–	3	–	0
North Carolina College	3	–	4	–	1	3	–	5	–	1
Howard	2	–	3	–	0	5	–	3	–	0
Norfolk State	4	–	4	–	0	4	–	4	–	0
Virginia Union	3	–	5	–	0	3	–	5	–	0
Livingstone	3	–	5	–	0	3	–	5	–	0
Shaw	4	–	5	–	0	4	–	5	–	0
Elizabeth City State	3	–	5	–	0	3	–	5	–	0
Winston-Salem State	2	–	6	–	0	2	–	7	–	0
Fayetteville State	1	–	5	–	0	1	–	6	–	0
Hampton	0	–	7	–	0	1	–	8	–	0
$ – Conference champion; Rankings from NAIA poll

1965 Central Intercollegiate Conference football standings
	Conf.					Overall
Team	W		L		T	W		L		T
No. 12 Omaha $	4	–	0	–	0	8	–	1	–	0
Fort Hays State	3	–	1	–	0	6	–	3	–	0
Pittsburg State	2	–	2	–	0	3	–	6	–	0
Washburn	1	–	3	–	0	2	–	6	–	1
Emporia State	0	–	4	–	0	1	–	8	–	0
$ – Conference champion; Rankings from NAIA poll

1965 College Athletic Conference football standings
	Conf.					Overall
Team	W		L		T	W		L		T
Sewanee $	4	–	0	–	0	7	–	1	–	0
Washington University	3	–	1	–	0	7	–	2	–	0
Centre	2	–	2	–	0	4	–	3	–	1
Washington and Lee	1	–	3	–	0	3	–	6	–	0
Southwestern (TN)	0	–	4	–	0	2	–	6	–	0
$ – Conference champion

1965 College Conference of Illinois football standings
	Conf.					Overall
Team	W		L		T	W		L		T
No. 7 Illinois Wesleyan $	6	–	0	–	0	8	–	0	–	0
Carthage	5	–	1	–	0	6	–	2	–	0
North Central (IL)	3	–	3	–	0	5	–	3	–	0
Augustana (IL)	2	–	2	–	2	4	–	2	–	2
Carroll (WI)	1	–	4	–	1	3	–	4	–	1
Millikin	1	–	4	–	1	2	–	5	–	1
North Park	1	–	5	–	0	2	–	6	–	0
$ – Conference champion; Rankings from NAIA poll

1965 Eastern Football Conference football standings
	Conf.					Overall
Team	W		L		T	W		L		T
Southern Connecticut State $	5	–	0	–	0	7	–	3	–	0
Central Connecticut State	3	–	1	–	0	7	–	1	–	0
Montclair State	3	–	1	–	0	4	–	4	–	0
Bridgeport	1	–	3	–	0	3	–	6	–	0
Trenton State	1	–	4	–	0	1	–	8	–	0
Glassboro State	0	–	4	–	0	0	–	8	–	0
$ – Conference champion

1965 Far Western Conference football standings
	Conf.					Overall
Team	W		L		T	W		L		T
San Francisco State $	5	–	0	–	0	8	–	2	–	0
Nevada	4	–	1	–	0	6	–	4	–	0
UC Davis	3	–	2	–	0	4	–	6	–	0
Humboldt State	2	–	3	–	0	6	–	4	–	0
Sacramento State	1	–	4	–	0	3	–	7	–	0
Chico State	0	–	5	–	0	4	–	6	–	0
Cal State Hayward*	0	–	0	–	0	3	–	7	–	0
$ – Conference champion; * – Games vs. Cal State Hayward did not count as conference games in 1965.

1965 Gulf States Conference football standings
	Conf.					Overall
Team	W		L		T	W		L		T
Southwestern Louisiana +	4	–	1	–	0	6	–	3	–	0
McNeese State +	4	–	1	–	0	5	–	4	–	0
Louisiana Tech	3	–	2	–	0	4	–	4	–	0
Northwestern State	2	–	3	–	0	5	–	3	–	0
Southeastern Louisiana	2	–	3	–	0	5	–	4	–	0
Northeast Louisiana State	0	–	5	–	0	1	–	8	–	0
+ – Conference co-champions

1965 Hoosier Conference football standings
	Conf.					Overall
Team	W		L		T	W		L		T
Anderson (IN) $	4	–	1	–	0	4	–	5	–	0
Taylor	3	–	1	–	1	3	–	5	–	1
Indiana Central	3	–	2	–	0	6	–	3	–	0
Franklin (IN)	2	–	2	–	1	3	–	5	–	1
Manchester (IN)	0	–	3	–	2	2	–	5	–	2
Hanover	1	–	4	–	0	1	–	8	–	0
$ – Conference champion

1965 Independent College Athletic Conference football standings
	Conf.					Overall
Team	W		L		T	W		L		T
Alfred +	2	–	1	–	0	5	–	4	–	0
St. Lawrence +	2	–	1	–	0	4	–	4	–	0
Hobart	2	–	2	–	0	4	–	4	–	0
Union (NY)	2	–	2	–	0	4	–	4	–	0
RPI	0	–	2	–	0	1	–	6	–	0
+ – Conference co-champions

1965 Indiana Collegiate Conference football standings
	Conf.					Overall
Team	W		L		T	W		L		T
Ball State $^	6	–	0	–	0	9	–	0	–	1
Butler	4	–	2	–	0	6	–	3	–	0
Evansville	3	–	3	–	0	5	–	4	–	0
Indiana State	2	–	3	–	1	4	–	3	–	1
Saint Joseph's (IN)	2	–	4	–	0	3	–	5	–	0
Valparaiso	2	–	4	–	0	3	–	6	–	0
DePauw	1	–	4	–	1	2	–	6	–	1
$ – Conference champion; ^ – Grantland Rice Bowl participant

1965 Interstate Intercollegiate Athletic Conference football standings
	Conf.					Overall
Team	W		L		T	W		L		T
Northern Illinois $	4	–	0	–	0	9	–	1	–	0
Central Michigan	3	–	1	–	0	5	–	5	–	0
Western Illinois	2	–	2	–	0	4	–	5	–	0
Eastern Illinois	1	–	3	–	0	3	–	5	–	0
Illinois State	0	–	4	–	0	0	–	9	–	0
$ – Conference champion

1965 Iowa Conference football standings
	Conf.					Overall
Team	W		L		T	W		L		T
No. 16 Central (IA) $	7	–	0	–	0	8	–	1	–	0
Luther	6	–	1	–	0	6	–	3	–	0
Dubuque	5	–	2	–	0	6	–	2	–	1
Buena Vista	4	–	3	–	0	6	–	3	–	0
Upper Iowa	3	–	4	–	0	4	–	5	–	0
Simpson (IA)	2	–	5	–	0	3	–	6	–	0
Wartburg	1	–	6	–	0	2	–	7	–	0
William Penn	0	–	7	–	0	1	–	8	–	0
$ – Conference champion; Rankings from NAIA poll

1965 Lone Star Conference football standings
	Conf.					Overall
Team	W		L		T	W		L		T
No. 2 Sul Ross $^	6	–	0	–	0	10	–	1	–	0
Southwest Texas State	4	–	2	–	0	8	–	2	–	0
Stephen F. Austin	4	–	2	–	0	6	–	3	–	0
Texas A&I	4	–	2	–	0	6	–	3	–	0
East Texas State	2	–	4	–	0	4	–	5	–	0
Sam Houston State	1	–	4	–	0	4	–	6	–	0
Howard Payne	0	–	6	–	0	2	–	8	–	0
McMurry	0	–	0	–	0	4	–	5	–	1
$ – Conference champion; ^ – NAIA playoff participant; Rankings from NAIA poll

1965 Mason–Dixon Conference football standings
	Conf.					Overall
Team	W		L		T	W		L		T
Randolph–Macon $	4	–	0	–	0	7	–	2	–	0
Shepherd	2	–	0	–	0	2	–	5	–	0
Hampden–Sydney	3	–	1	–	0	6	–	3	–	0
Johns Hopkins	1	–	1	–	0	1	–	6	–	1
Bridgewater	1	–	3	–	0	1	–	7	–	0
Western Maryland	0	–	3	–	0	3	–	6	–	0
Gallaudet	0	–	3	–	0	1	–	8	–	0
$ – Conference champion

1965 Michigan Intercollegiate Athletic Association football standings
	Conf.					Overall
Team	W		L		T	W		L		T
Albion $	5	–	0	–	0	7	–	2	–	0
Kalamazoo	3	–	2	–	0	5	–	3	–	0
Hope	3	–	2	–	0	4	–	4	–	0
Olivet	2	–	3	–	0	3	–	6	–	0
Alma	1	–	4	–	0	3	–	5	–	0
Adrian	1	–	4	–	0	1	–	7	–	0
$ – Conference champion

1965 Mid-Ohio Conference football standings
	Conf.					Overall
Team	W		L		T	W		L		T
Ashland $	3	–	0	–	0	7	–	1	–	1
Bluffton	2	–	1	–	0	7	–	2	–	0
Defiance	1	–	2	–	0	3	–	4	–	0
Wilmington (OH)	0	–	3	–	0	0	–	7	–	1
$ – Conference champion

1965 Middle Atlantic Conference football standings
	Conf.					Overall
Team	W		L		T	W		L		T
University Division
Bucknell x	5	–	1	–	0	6	–	3	–	0
Hofstra	4	–	1	–	0	8	–	2	–	0
Temple	3	–	2	–	0	5	–	5	–	0
Delaware	3	–	3	–	0	5	–	4	–	0
Gettysburg	2	–	4	–	0	5	–	4	–	0
Lehigh	1	–	3	–	0	1	–	8	–	0
Lafayette	1	–	5	–	0	3	–	7	–	0
Northern College Division
Wilkes x	6	–	1	–	0	7	–	1	–	0
Upsala	5	–	2	–	0	5	–	3	–	0
Lycoming	4	–	2	–	0	5	–	3	–	0
Juniata	3	–	2	–	0	3	–	5	–	0
Moravian	4	–	4	–	0	5	–	4	–	0
Albright	3	–	4	–	0	4	–	5	–	0
Wagner	2	–	3	–	0	3	–	6	–	0
Susquehanna *	0	–	3	–	0	0	–	9	–	0
Southern College Division
Swarthmore x	6	–	0	–	0	6	–	1	–	0
Dickinson	7	–	1	–	0	7	–	1	–	0
Drexel	4	–	2	–	0	6	–	2	–	0
Lebanon Valley	4	–	3	–	0	5	–	3	–	0
Franklin & Marshall	3	–	4	–	0	4	–	4	–	0
Haverford	2	–	3	–	0	2	–	5	–	0
Western Maryland	2	–	4	–	0	3	–	6	–	0
Pennsylvania Military	2	–	6	–	0	2	–	7	–	0
Muhlenberg	1	–	8	–	0	1	–	8	–	0
Johns Hopkins	1	–	4	–	1	1	–	6	–	1
Ursinus	1	–	4	–	1	1	–	6	–	1
West Chester *	0	–	0	–	0	5	–	3	–	0
x – Division champion/co-champions; * – Ineligible for championship due to insufficient conference games

1965 Midwest Athletic Association football standings
	Conf.					Overall
Team	W		L		T	W		L		T
No. 1 Tennessee A&I $	3	–	0	–	0	9	–	0	–	1
Lincoln (MO)	2	–	1	–	0	5	–	5	–	0
Central State (OH)	1	–	2	–	0	3	–	5	–	0
Kentucky State	0	–	3	–	0	4	–	4	–	0
$ – Conference champion; Rankings from Pittsburgh Courier

1965 Midwest Conference football standings
	Conf.					Overall
Team	W		L		T	W		L		T
Ripon $	7	–	1	–	0	7	–	1	–	0
Grinnell	6	–	2	–	0	6	–	2	–	0
Beloit	5	–	3	–	0	5	–	3	–	0
Lawrence	5	–	3	–	0	5	–	3	–	0
St. Olaf	5	–	3	–	0	5	–	3	–	0
Coe	4	–	4	–	0	4	–	4	–	0
Carleton	3	–	5	–	0	3	–	5	–	0
Cornell (IA)	2	–	6	–	0	2	–	6	–	0
Monmouth (IL)	2	–	6	–	0	2	–	6	–	0
Knox	1	–	7	–	0	1	–	7	–	0
$ – Conference champion

1965 Minnesota Intercollegiate Athletic Conference football standings
	Conf.					Overall
Team	W		L		T	W		L		T
No. 1 Saint John's (MN) $^	7	–	0	–	0	11	–	0	–	0
No. 19 Concordia (MN)	5	–	2	–	0	6	–	2	–	0
St. Thomas (MN)	4	–	2	–	1	4	–	4	–	1
Gustavus Adolphus	4	–	3	–	0	5	–	4	–	0
Minnesota–Duluth	3	–	4	–	0	4	–	5	–	0
Augsburg	2	–	4	–	1	3	–	5	–	1
Hamline	2	–	5	–	0	3	–	6	–	0
Macalester	0	–	7	–	0	0	–	8	–	0
$ – Conference champion; ^ – NAIA playoff participant; Rankings from NAIA poll

1965 Missouri Intercollegiate Athletic Association football standings
	Conf.					Overall
Team	W		L		T	W		L		T
NE Missouri State $	5	–	0	–	0	8	–	2	–	0
SW Missouri State	4	–	1	–	0	7	–	2	–	0
NW Missouri State	3	–	2	–	0	6	–	3	–	0
SE Missouri State	2	–	3	–	0	2	–	8	–	0
Central Missouri State	1	–	4	–	0	2	–	6	–	1
Missouri–Rolla	0	–	5	–	0	2	–	7	–	0
$ – Conference champion

1965 North Central Conference football standings
	Conf.					Overall
Team	W		L		T	W		L		T
North Dakota State $	6	–	0	–	0	11	–	0	–	0
North Dakota	5	–	1	–	0	9	–	1	–	0
State College of Iowa	4	–	2	–	0	4	–	5	–	0
Morningside	3	–	3	–	0	5	–	4	–	0
Augustana (SD)	1	–	4	–	1	1	–	6	–	1
South Dakota State	1	–	4	–	1	1	–	8	–	1
South Dakota	0	–	6	–	0	2	–	8	–	0
$ – Conference champion

1965 Northern Intercollegiate Conference football standings
	Conf.					Overall
Team	W		L		T	W		L		T
Michigan Tech $	4	–	1	–	0	6	–	2	–	0
Winona State	3	–	2	–	0	6	–	2	–	0
Mankato State	3	–	2	–	0	5	–	3	–	1
Bemidji State	3	–	2	–	0	4	–	4	–	0
Moorhead State	2	–	3	–	0	5	–	4	–	0
St. Cloud State	0	–	5	–	0	2	–	6	–	1
$ – Conference champion

1965 Ohio Athletic Conference football standings
	Conf.					Overall
Team	W		L		T	W		L		T
Muskingum $	7	–	0	–	0	8	–	1	–	0
Wittenberg	4	–	1	–	0	6	–	2	–	0
Akron	4	–	1	–	0	5	–	3	–	1
Mount Union	5	–	2	–	0	7	–	2	–	0
Capital	5	–	2	–	0	6	–	2	–	0
Denison	5	–	2	–	0	6	–	3	–	0
Otterbein	4	–	3	–	0	4	–	5	–	0
Hiram	3	–	4	–	0	4	–	4	–	0
Wooster	3	–	4	–	0	4	–	5	–	0
Baldwin–Wallace	2	–	3	–	0	4	–	3	–	1
Ohio Wesleyan	1	–	3	–	1	3	–	5	–	1
Heidelberg	1	–	5	–	1	2	–	5	–	2
Oberlin	1	–	5	–	0	1	–	7	–	0
Kenyon	0	–	5	–	0	1	–	8	–	0
Marietta	0	–	5	–	0	1	–	8	–	0
$ – Conference champion

1965 Ohio Valley Conference football standings
	Conf.					Overall
Team	W		L		T	W		L		T
Middle Tennessee $	7	–	0	–	0	10	–	0	–	0
Austin Peay	6	–	1	–	0	8	–	1	–	0
Eastern Kentucky	4	–	2	–	1	4	–	4	–	1
Morehead State	3	–	4	–	0	3	–	6	–	0
Tennessee Tech	3	–	4	–	0	3	–	7	–	0
Murray State	1	–	4	–	2	2	–	6	–	2
Western Kentucky	1	–	5	–	1	2	–	6	–	2
East Tennessee State	1	–	6	–	0	2	–	6	–	1
$ – Conference champion

1965 Pennsylvania State College Athletic Conference football standings
	Conf.					Overall
Team	W		L		T	W		L		T
East Division
No. 8/10 East Stroudsburg xy$	6	–	0	–	0	10	–	0	–	0
West Chester	5	–	1	–	0	5	–	3	–	0
Mansfield	4	–	2	–	0	4	–	5	–	0
Bloomsburg	3	–	3	–	0	4	–	4	–	0
Millersville	2	–	4	–	0	4	–	4	–	0
Cheyney	1	–	5	–	0	2	–	5	–	0
Kutztown	0	–	6	–	0	1	–	7	–	0
West Division
Indiana (PA) xy	5	–	1	–	0	7	–	3	–	0
Clarion	4	–	1	–	1	6	–	2	–	1
California (PA)	4	–	2	–	0	5	–	3	–	0
Lock Haven	3	–	3	–	0	5	–	3	–	0
Slippery Rock	2	–	3	–	1	4	–	3	–	1
Shippensburg	2	–	4	–	0	3	–	5	–	0
Edinboro *	0	–	6	–	0	6	–	2	–	1
Championship: East Stroudsburg 26, Indiana (PA) 10
$ – Conference champion; x – Division champion/co-champions; y – Championship game participant; * – Edinboro forfeited four conference victories—over IUP, Clarion, Shippensburg, and California—but NCAA and Edinboro records do not reflect the forfeits in the team's overall record.; Rankings from NAIA poll and AP small college poll

1965 Prairie College Conference football standings
	Conf.					Overall
Team	W		L		T	W		L		T
Illinois College +	1	–	1	–	0	6	–	2	–	0
Principia +	1	–	1	–	0	5	–	3	–	0
Rose Poly +	1	–	1	–	0	5	–	3	–	0
+ – Conference co-champions

1965 Presidents' Athletic Conference football standings
	Conf.					Overall
Team	W		L		T	W		L		T
Bethany (WV) $	5	–	1	–	0	5	–	3	–	0
John Carroll	5	–	1	–	1	5	–	1	–	1
Eastern Michigan	3	–	1	–	1	3	–	4	–	1
Wayne State (MI)	3	–	2	–	1	3	–	4	–	1
Western Reserve	3	–	4	–	1	3	–	4	–	1
Washington & Jefferson	2	–	4	–	0	4	–	4	–	0
Allegheny	2	–	4	–	0	3	–	5	–	0
Case Tech	2	–	5	–	0	3	–	5	–	0
Thiel	2	–	5	–	0	3	–	5	–	0
$ – Conference champion

1965 Rocky Mountain Conference football standings
	Conf.					Overall
Team	W		L		T	W		L		T
Western State (CO) $	3	–	0	–	0	7	–	1	–	0
Colorado State–Greeley	2	–	1	–	0	4	–	4	–	2
Adams State	1	–	2	–	0	5	–	4	–	0
Colorado Mines	0	–	3	–	0	4	–	5	–	0
$ – Conference champion

1965 Southern California Intercollegiate Athletic Conference football standings
	Conf.					Overall
Team	W		L		T	W		L		T
No. 11 Occidental $	5	–	0	–	0	8	–	1	–	0
Pomona	3	–	2	–	0	5	–	5	–	0
Whittier	2	–	2	–	0	4	–	5	–	0
Redlands	2	–	2	–	0	4	–	6	–	0
Claremont-Mudd	1	–	3	–	0	2	–	7	–	0
Caltech	0	–	4	–	0	0	–	7	–	0
$ – Conference champion; Rankings from NAIA poll

1965 Southland Conference football standings
	Conf.					Overall
Team	W		L		T	W		L		T
Lamar Tech $	3	–	1	–	0	6	–	4	–	0
Arlington State	2	–	2	–	0	6	–	3	–	0
Trinity (TX)	2	–	2	–	0	4	–	5	–	1
Abilene Christian	2	–	2	–	0	4	–	5	–	0
Arkansas State	1	–	3	–	0	6	–	3	–	0
$ – Conference champion

1965 Southwestern Athletic Conference football standings
	Conf.					Overall
Team	W		L		T	W		L		T
No. 13 Grambling $	6	–	1	–	0	8	–	3	–	0
Southern	4	–	2	–	1	5	–	4	–	1
Texas Southern	4	–	2	–	1	5	–	4	–	1
Jackson State	3	–	3	–	1	5	–	3	–	1
Prairie View A&M	3	–	3	–	1	5	–	3	–	1
Arkansas AM&N	3	–	3	–	1	4	–	5	–	1
Alcorn A&M	2	–	4	–	1	3	–	5	–	1
Wiley	0	–	7	–	0	1	–	7	–	0
$ – Conference champion; Rankings from UPI small college poll

1965 Virginia Little Eight Conference football standings
	Conf.					Overall
Team	W		L		T	W		L		T
Randolph–Macon $	3	–	0	–	0	7	–	2	–	0
Emory and Henry	1	–	0	–	0	3	–	6	–	0
Hampden–Sydney	3	–	2	–	0	6	–	3	–	0
Washington and Lee	1	–	2	–	0	3	–	6	–	0
Frederick	0	–	1	–	0	4	–	6	–	0
Bridgewater	0	–	3	–	0	1	–	7	–	0
$ – Conference champion

1965 Wisconsin State University Conference football standings
	Conf.					Overall
Team	W		L		T	W		L		T
Stout State $	6	–	0	–	0	7	–	1	–	1
Whitewater State	4	–	1	–	1	7	–	2	–	1
La Crosse State	4	–	1	–	1	5	–	3	–	1
Stevens Point State	4	–	2	–	0	6	–	3	–	0
River Falls State	3	–	2	–	2	4	–	3	–	2
Oshkosh State	3	–	4	–	0	5	–	4	–	0
Eau Claire State	2	–	6	–	0	2	–	6	–	0
Platteville State	1	–	5	–	0	2	–	6	–	1
Superior State	0	–	6	–	0	0	–	9	–	0
$ – Conference champion

1965 Yankee Conference football standings
	Conf.					Overall
Team	W		L		T	W		L		T
Maine $	5	–	0	–	0	8	–	2	–	0
UMass	4	–	1	–	0	7	–	2	–	0
Vermont	2	–	2	–	0	6	–	2	–	0
Connecticut	2	–	2	–	0	3	–	6	–	0
Rhode Island	1	–	4	–	0	2	–	7	–	0
New Hampshire	0	–	5	–	0	0	–	8	–	0
$ – Conference champion

1965 NCAA College Division independents football records
	Conf.			Overall
Team	W	L	T	W		L		T
Springfield		–		9	–	0	–	0
Ithaca		–		8	–	0	–	0
Parsons		–		8	–	1	–	0
Santa Clara		–		8	–	1	–	0
UC Santa Barbara		–		8	–	2	–	0
Cortland		–		7	–	2	–	0
Wabash		–		7	–	2	–	0
Northeastern		–		6	–	2	–	0
UC Riverside		–		6	–	2	–	0
Tampa		–		6	–	2	–	1
Northern Michigan		–		7	–	3	–	0
Mississippi Valley State		–		6	–	3	–	0
St. Norbert		–		6	–	3	–	0
Rose Poly		–		5	–	3	–	0
Drake		–		6	–	4	–	0
Chattanooga		–		5	–	4	–	1
Arizona State–Flagstaff		–		5	–	4	–	1
Lake Forest		–		4	–	4	–	0
Cal Poly Pomona		–		4	–	5	–	0
Howard (AL)		–		4	–	6	–	0
Portland State		–		4	–	6	–	0
Colorado College		–		3	–	5	–	0
Milwaukee		–		2	–	6	–	0
Southern Illinois		–		2	–	8	–	0
Pacific (CA)		–		2	–	8	–	0
Hawaii		–		1	–	8	–	1
Carnegie Tech		–		1	–	7	–	0

== Rankings ==
College Division teams (also referred to as "small college") were ranked in polls by the AP (a panel of writers) and by UPI (coaches). The national champion(s) for each season were determined by the final poll rankings, published at or near the end of the regular season, before any bowl games were played.

=== College Division final polls ===
In 1965, both services ranked North Dakota State (10–0) first; the UPI coaches' poll had Cal State Los Angeles (8–1) second, while the AP poll had Middle Tennessee (9–0) as the number two team. North Dakota State later beat Grambling, 20–7 in the Pecan Bowl in Abilene, Texas.

Associated Press (writers) final poll
Published on November 26

Rank	School	Record	No. 1 votes	Total points
1	North Dakota State	10–0	4	84
2	Middle Tennessee	9–0†	2	68
3	Sul Ross	10–0	1	43
4	Cal State Los Angeles	8–1		35
5	Tennessee A&I	8–0		32
6	Northern Illinois	9–0		30
7	Maine	8–1		30
8	East Carolina	8–1	1	27
9	Saint John's (MN)	9–0		20
10	East Stroudsburg	9–0		19

†Denotes team won a game after AP poll, hence record differs in UPI poll

United Press International (coaches) final poll
Published on December 5

Rank	School	Record	No. 1 votes	Total points
1	North Dakota State	10–0	21	301
2	Cal State Los Angeles	8–1	2	224
3	Middle Tennessee	10–0	3	209
4	East Carolina	8–1	1	187
5	Weber State	8–1	3	117
6	Maine	8–1		116
7	Northern Illinois	9–0		104
8	North Dakota	8–1	1	97
9	Long Beach State	9–1		76
10	Sul Ross	10–0		73

== Bowl games ==
The postseason consisted of four bowl games as regional finals, played on December 11.

Bowl	Region	Location	Winning team		Losing team		Ref
Tangerine	East	Orlando, Florida	East Carolina	31	Maine	0	
Grantland Rice	Mideast	Murfreesboro, Tennessee	Tennessee A&I 14, Ball State 14				
Pecan	Midwest	Abilene, Texas	North Dakota State	20	Grambling	7	
Camellia	West	Sacramento, California	Cal State Los Angeles	18	UC Santa Barbara	10	

== See also ==
- 1965 NCAA University Division football season
- 1965 NAIA football season
