= San Diego State Aztecs rugby union =

College rugby union club team

San Diego State Aztecs
- Full name: San Diego State Aztecs Rugby Club
- Union: USA Rugby
- Nickname: Aztecs
- Founded: 1958; 68 years ago
- Location: San Diego, California
- Ground: ENS 700 Field
- Coach(es): Jason Merrill (men); Tony Roulhac (women)
- League(s): Division 1-A – California (men); Division 1 – Pacific Desert (women)
1st kit	2nd kit

Official website
- arc.sdsu.edu/mens_rugby

San Diego State Aztecs Rugby Club is the rugby union club that represents San Diego State University (SDSU). The men's team competes in Division 1-A in the California Conference and the women's team competes in Division II in the Pacific Desert Conference. The team plays its home games at ENS 700 Field.

The men's team won the 1987 National Collegiate Rugby Championship.

== Teams ==
=== Men's team ===
Since the inception of the club in 1958, men's rugby has been both a popular and successful sport on campus at SDSU, so much so that Aztec alumni went on to set-up the rugby team of Old Mission Beach Athletic Club (OMBAC) in 1966 and also to found San Diego Old Aztecs RFC in 1978. In addition to the 1987 National Championship, the Aztecs have won numerous SCRFU Collegiate Conference titles to progress to the national playoffs, including 1996, 2007, 2008 (quarterfinalists), 2009 (semifinalists), 2010 (quarterfinalists) and 2012 (semifinalists). San Diego State men's teams have also excelled at the short-form of the game; finishing second at the 2010 Collegiate Rugby Championship (broadcast live on NBC) and qualifying to play in the USA Rugby Sevens Collegiate National Championships in 2011 (quarterfinalists), 2012 and 2015 (quarterfinalists).

=== Women's team ===
Women first represented San Diego State at rugby in 1975 and, like the men, had an astonishingly successful introduction, finishing the season second in the nation after losing the inaugural Women's Collegiate National Championship to the University of Colorado. The team played successfully for eleven seasons, even going on an undefeated four-match tour of New Zealand in 1981. In 1986 the Aztecs combined with a local club team the Rio Grande Surfers. The Surfers, now known as the San Diego Surfers, play in the Women's Premier League, the highest level of women's rugby in the United States. The Aztec women's team has recently been re-established on campus and they were progressing through the 2020 season until it was cut-short by the COVID-19 pandemic.

== Club history ==
=== Founding and inaugural season ===
The Aztec Rugby Club, in its first season, took first place in the Southern California Rugby Association ... it appears that rugby will have a very favorable future on Montezuma Mesa.

sic: read Southern California Rugby Football Union

— Del Sudoeste p.214, 1958

The first record of anyone having an interest in playing rugby at San Diego State College (as it was then) is an advertisement in the school newspaper, The Daily Aztec, at the end of the fall semester of 1957 asking for Men interested in forming a rugby team to attend a meeting. More than 45 people turned up so a season schedule was put together along with a timetable of practices to be held over the winter break and Mr. Fred Quiett of the university's Engineering Department agreed to become the club's first faculty representative.

The team played its first competitive matches in the spring semester at the Southern California Rugby Football Union Carnival in Santa Ana on Sunday February 9, 1958, defeating Pomona-Claremont 8–0 and losing to the Pepperdine College Waves 3–8. The first of seven league matches that season was played against El Centro in El Centro on Saturday February 15, the Aztecs won 15–0. Their next match was their first at home, it was played at Aztec Bowl (now the site of Viejas Arena) against Ontario and was won by the Aztecs 20–14.

Winning ways continued that first Cinderella season with a further three victories before suffering their first league defeat to Eagle Rock Athletic Club. This set-up their final match with Santa Ana College on the next weekend as a championship decider, the Aztecs won the match and thus they also clinched the league in their inaugural season. Four of the team were named on the Southern California All star team (Bob Johnston, Ernie Trumper, Jim Hansen and Ian Richardson), two to the All-star second team (Bob Shank and Jim Hastings) and one honorable-mention (Ray Fackrell).

San Diego State Aztec rugby - men's team inaugural season (1958)
Date	Time	Match type	Opponent	Location	Result	Score
1958-02-09		Friendly	Pomona-Claremont Colleges	Santa Ana, California	Won	8-0
1958-02-09		Friendly	Pepperdine College Waves	Santa Ana, California	Lost	3-8
1958-02-15	2:00 p.m.	League	El Centro	Away - El Centro, California	Won	15-0
1958-02-23	2:30 p.m.	League	Ontario	Home - Aztec Bowl	Won	20-14
1958-02-29	2:00 p.m.	League	Pomona-Claremont Colleges	Home - Aztec Bowl	Won	8-6
1958-03-08	1:00 p.m.	League	UCLA Bruins	Away - Westwood, Los Angeles	Won	14-11
1958-03-16	2:00 p.m.	League	Pepperdine College Waves	Home - Aztec Bowl	Won	17-0
1958-03-22	1:00 p.m.	League	Eagle Rock Athletic Club	Away - Rancho Cienega Playgrounds, Los Angeles	Lost	9-3
1958-03-29	2:30 p.m.	League	Santa Ana College	Home - Aztec Bowl	Won	8-0

=== National championship ===
The Aztecs won the Men's US National Collegiate Rugby Championship in 1987, overcoming Dartmouth College rugby club 22–6 in the semifinals and beating the United States Air Force Academy rugby club 10–9 in the final. The 1987 men's rugby team was inducted into the San Diego State University Aztec Hall of Fame in 2005.

== Notable alumni ==
=== International fifteens players ===
Alumni of San Diego State who have played international rugby union

- (United States) Sean Allen
- (United States) Scott Bracken –– also current U20 men's 15's head coach
- (Philippines) Derrick Broussard
- (United States) Kayla Canett represented the USA in fifteens most notably at the 2017 Women's Rugby World Cup
- (United States) Dan Dorsey –– Best known at SDSU in the mid 1990s as a nose tackle on the Aztec football team
- (Croatia) Ante Drazina
- (United States) Dennis Gonzalez
- (United States) Chris Harju –– 1991 Women's Rugby World Cup winner inducted, with her teammates, into US Rugby Hall of Fame in 2017
- (United States) Duncan Kelm
- (United States) Chris Lippert –– US Rugby Hall of Fame inductee 2020
- (United States) Craig Levine –– Maccabi USA Rugby Hall of Fame inductee 2017
- (United States) Chris O'Brien –– Kicker on Aztec football team while All American rugby player at SDSU; later Eagles specialist kicking coach. Inducted into the US Rugby Hall of Fame in 2023
- (United States) Mike Saunders –– US Rugby Hall of Fame inductee 2018
- (United States) Brian Vizard –– US Rugby Hall of Fame inductee 2016
- (United States) Scott Yungling

=== Professional fifteens players ===
Alumni of San Diego State who have played professional rugby union

- Derrick Broussard (SDSU 2008–2013) –– San Diego Legion (2018, 2020–)
- Gil Covey (SDSU 2015–2018) –– San Diego Legion (2018–)
- Dan Dorsey (SDSU 1995–1998) –– Bath Rugby (2001–2002) Ospreys RFC (2002-2003) Rotherham Titans (2003-2004)
- Nico Gilli (SDSU 2018–2021) –– San Diego Legion (2022–)
- Kalei Konrad (SDSU 2011–2015) –– San Diego Breakers (2016–2017)
- Nick Lupian (SDSU 2014–2018) –– San Diego Legion (2018–)
- Austin Switzer (SDSU 2016–2017) –– San Diego Legion (2017–2018)
- Ryan Walls (SDSU 2015-2017) –– San Diego Legion (2018–2019)

=== International sevens players ===
Alumni of San Diego State who have played international rugby sevens

- (Philippines) Derrick Broussard
- (United States) Kayla Canett has represented the USA in sevens (most notably winning bronze at the 2024 Olympics)
- (United States) Dennis Gonzalez
- (United States) Duncan Kelm
- (United States) Mike Saunders –– US Rugby Hall of Fame inductee 2018
- (United States) Stephen Tomasin –– All-American (7s and 15s), Bronze medalist at 2015 Pan American Games and participant at the 2018 Rugby World Cup Sevens
- (United States) Brian Vizard –– US Rugby Hall of Fame inductee 2016

=== Professional sevens players ===
- Kayla Canett played with the Pittsburgh Steeltoes of Premier Rugby Sevens (PR7s) since 2023
- Stephen Tomasin –– One of the first players ever signed by Premier Rugby Sevens (PR7s) in 2021

=== Collegiate All-Americans and Junior Internationals ===
Students and alumni of San Diego State who have been awarded All-American honors for rugby, played for the US Junior All Americans (U20s), the US Collegiate All Americans (U23s) or who have played international rugby at a junior level for another nation.

Year	Fifteen-a-side rugby			Seven-a-side rugby	
Year	First team	Second team	Honorable mention	First team	Honorable mention
1985	O'Brien, Chris Lenihan, Pat				
1986	Loberg, Eric Parker, Dwayne Cole, Colin				
1987	Forester, Steve Lippert, Chris Parker, Dwayne				
1988	Allen, Sean Perry, Kevin Gonzalez, Dennis Forster, Steve				
1995		Yungling, Scott			
1996	Yungling, Scott				
1997	Blatt, Aaron				
1998	Blatt, Aaron				
2002	Smith, Greg				
2005			Winter, Zach		
2009	Kelm, Duncan Mulhall, Stephen Purcell, Brenden Ross, Alex		Heiler, Zach Purcell, Jamie		
2010	Kelm, Duncan Ross, Alex		Bredesen, Chris Buboltz, David Honaker, Darrell Purcell, Jamie		
2012	Kelm, Jamie Konrad, Kalei				
2013	Tomasin, Stephen U23				
2014	Konrad, Kalei				
2015	Konrad, Kalei				Konrad, Kalei
2016	Lupian, Nick U23				
2017	Jorstad, Jacob U20		Zinda, Jacob		

=== Rugby coaches and administrators ===
Alumni of San Diego State who have become coaches and/or administrators of rugby at the highest level

- Nic Benson –– Deputy Commissioner Major League Rugby
- Reldon “Bing” Dawson –– US Rugby Hall of Fame inductee 2018
  - Played rugby and football at San Diego State University graduating in 1967
  - Began his coaching career under Don Coryell and John Madden as a Graduate Assistant at SDSU
  - Coached OMBAC for 20 years creating a rugby powerhouse
    - US 7's Club Champions 1985, 1995, 2000, 2001, 2002, and 2006
    - US 15's Champions 1988, 1989, 1991, 1993, 1994, and 1996
    - Rugby Super League Champions 2006
  - more than 70 OMBAC players coached by Dawson between 1985 and 2006 represented the U.S. in 7's or 15's
  - He also coached Southern California Griffins, the Pacific Coast Grizzlies and the U.S. Eagles National Teams
- Cornel Muller –– Operations and Production Manager at Major League Rugby
- Giovanni Vaglietti –– Executive Director, USA Youth and High School Rugby (the sanctioned body for all Youth & High School Rugby across the country)
  - Born and raised in South Africa, Vaglietti came to San Diego State University on an athletic scholarship
  - He worked in San Diego State University’s Athletic Department
  - He also worked at the Australian Open, the BNP Paribas Open and ClubCorp
  - Previously CEO of Southern California Youth Rugby
- Bob Watkins –– US Rugby Hall of Fame inductee 2015
  - played rugby for San Diego State University, Old Mission Beach Athletic Club and the Southern California XV.
  - Founding Director of U.S.A. Rugby Football Union (Director 1975-1991, President 1983-1987 & 1989-1991)
  - Managed U.S. Eagles versus Canada, U.S.S.R., South Africa, New Zealand, England, Wales and Hong Kong
  - Past President of the Pacific Coast and Southern California Rugby Football Unions
  - Chairman of the U.S. Rugby Super League and U.S. Rugby Foundation.

== Notable coaches ==
Former coaches of San Diego State Aztec rugby who have played and/or coached international and/or professional rugby

- Scott Bracken
  - men's 15's player
  - U20 men's 15's head coach
- Steve Gray
  - men's 15's player and captain,
  - men's 7's player, captain and assistant coach
  - women's 7's assistant coach
  - US Rugby Hall of Fame inductee 2016, Gray coached the Aztecs to the National Championship in 1987.
- Matt Hawkins –– SDSU Assistant and later Head Coach 2008 - 2010
  - men's 15's player
  - men's 7's player and head coach
- Dan Payne
  - men's 15's player (2007) and assistant coach (2011 Rugby World Cup)
  - USA Selects head coach 2009
  - USA Rugby Chief Executive Officer 2016
  - USA Rugby General Manager of High Performance 2021
  - Coached the Aztecs 2006–2009
- Matt Sherman
  - men's 15's player and assistant coach
  - U18 boys head coach
  - Sherman spent two seasons as San Diego State's head coach, leading the Aztecs to the Final Four in 2009 and the National quarterfinals a year later.
- Zack Test
  - men's 7's player
  - United States Pan American Games bronze medallist
  - men's 15's player
  - San Diego Legion assistant coach (2017-2020) and co-head coach (2020–)
