= 1991 Women's Rugby World Cup final =

1991 rugby union match

1991 Women's Rugby World Cup Final
- Event: 1991 Women's Rugby World Cup
United States	England
(United States)	(England)
19	6
- Date: 14 April 1991
- Venue: Cardiff Arms Park, Cardiff
- Referee: Les Peard (Wales)
- Attendance: c. 3,000

The 1991 Women's Rugby World Cup Final was a rugby union match to decide the winner of the inaugural 1991 Women's Rugby World Cup. The match was between the United States and England, it took place on 14 April 1991 at Cardiff Arms Park in Wales. The United States were crowned the first-ever Champions after defeating England 19–6.

== Route to the final ==
England
Round
United States
Opponent
Result
Pool stage
Opponent
Result
Spain
12–0
Match 1
Netherlands
7–0
Italy
25–9
Match 2
Soviet Union
46–0

Team	Won	Drawn	Lost	For	Against
England	2	0	0	37	9
Spain	1	0	1	13	19
Italy	0	0	2	16	25

Final standing

Team	Won	Drawn	Lost	For	Against
United States	2	0	0	53	0
Netherlands	1	0	1	28	7
Soviet Union	0	0	2	0	74

Opponent
Result
Knockout stage
Opponent
Result
France
13–0
Semi-finals
New Zealand
7–0

The United States were placed in Pool 3 with the Netherlands and the Soviet Union. They defeated Netherlands 7–0 in Pontypool and then later thrashed the Soviet Union 46–0 in Cardiff. They met New Zealand in the semifinal at Cardiff Arms Park and beat them 7–0.

England were pooled with Spain and Italy in Pool 4. Their first match was against Spain in Swansea which they won 12–0. They beat Italy 25–9 in their last pool match and then went on to beat France 13–0 in their semifinal clash and earn themselves a place in the final with USA.

== Match ==
14 April 1991

England	6–19	United States
Try: Penalty try Con: Gill Burns		Try: Claire Godwin (2); Patty Connell; Con: Chris Harju (2); Pen: Chris Harju

Cardiff Arms Park, Cardiff

=== Summary ===
The Final took place in front of almost 3,000 people in Cardiff Arms Park. England led in the first half 6–3 after Gill Burns converted a penalty try. The second half belonged to the Americans as they scored 16 unanswered points with two tries from Claire Godwin and a try to Patty Connell with Chris Harju successfully converting two goals. The USA were champions in the end with 19–6.
