= Subaru Tecnica International =

Motorsports division of Subaru

- Type: Subsidiary
- Industry: Automotive
- Founded: 2 April 1988; 38 years ago
- Founder: Ryuichiro Kuze
- Headquarters: Osawa, Mitaka, Tokyo, Japan
- Key people: Yoshio Hirakawa; Masahiro Maeda; Hiroshi Mori; Koji Mitsuno
- Owner: Subaru Corporation
- Parent: Subaru
- Website: www.sti.jp

Subaru Tecnica International (in Japanese: スバルテクニカインターナショナル株式会社, romanized: Subaru Tekunika Intānashonaru Kabushiki-gaisha), or STI (prior to 2006, STi), is the Subaru Corporation's motorsports division. STI, along with Prodrive of the UK, specialized in the preparation of a variety of vehicles for the Subaru World Rally Team which competed in the World Rally Championship (WRC). It was founded in 1988 by Subaru Corporation (then known as Fuji Heavy Industries), the parent company of Subaru, to promote the company's performance-oriented identity.

== History ==
Subaru Tecnica International Inc. (STi) was established in 1988 by Fuji Heavy Industries to take over all of Subaru's motorsport activities and participate in the World Rally Championship (WRC). Subaru was seen as one of the world's top rally racing teams, but is no longer active at a factory level in the WRC.

The seeds of STI were planted in 1972, when Subaru campaigned the Leone in the Australia’s Southern Cross Rally. After their first foray into competition, Subaru made history with the first AWD car entered in the World Rally Championship (WRC), when the Leone 4WD entered the Safari Rally in 1980.

STi was then officially founded by Noriyuki Koseki and Ryuichiro Kuze in 1988. Previously, Koseki had helped prepare a Subaru FF-1 that was entered into the 1971 Baja 500 by San Bernardino Subaru dealer Jack Coyle. Although the FF-1 did not finish that year, it was able to complete the 1973 race and is now part of the Subaru of America historical collection. Koseki would go on to campaign Subarus privately in the Safari Rally starting in 1979.

=== Endurance record ===
STi president Ryuichiro Kuze partnered with British firm Prodrive in 1989 to develop a rally car using the Subaru Legacy chassis. The resulting performance model was the Legacy RS, which produced 220 PS (162 kW; 217 hp) mated to a five speed gearbox and weighing just over 2,600 pounds; it was manufactured by Subaru to homologate the type for FIA Group A racing. The vehicle had a top speed of 155 miles per hour, which was considered extremely powerful at the time.

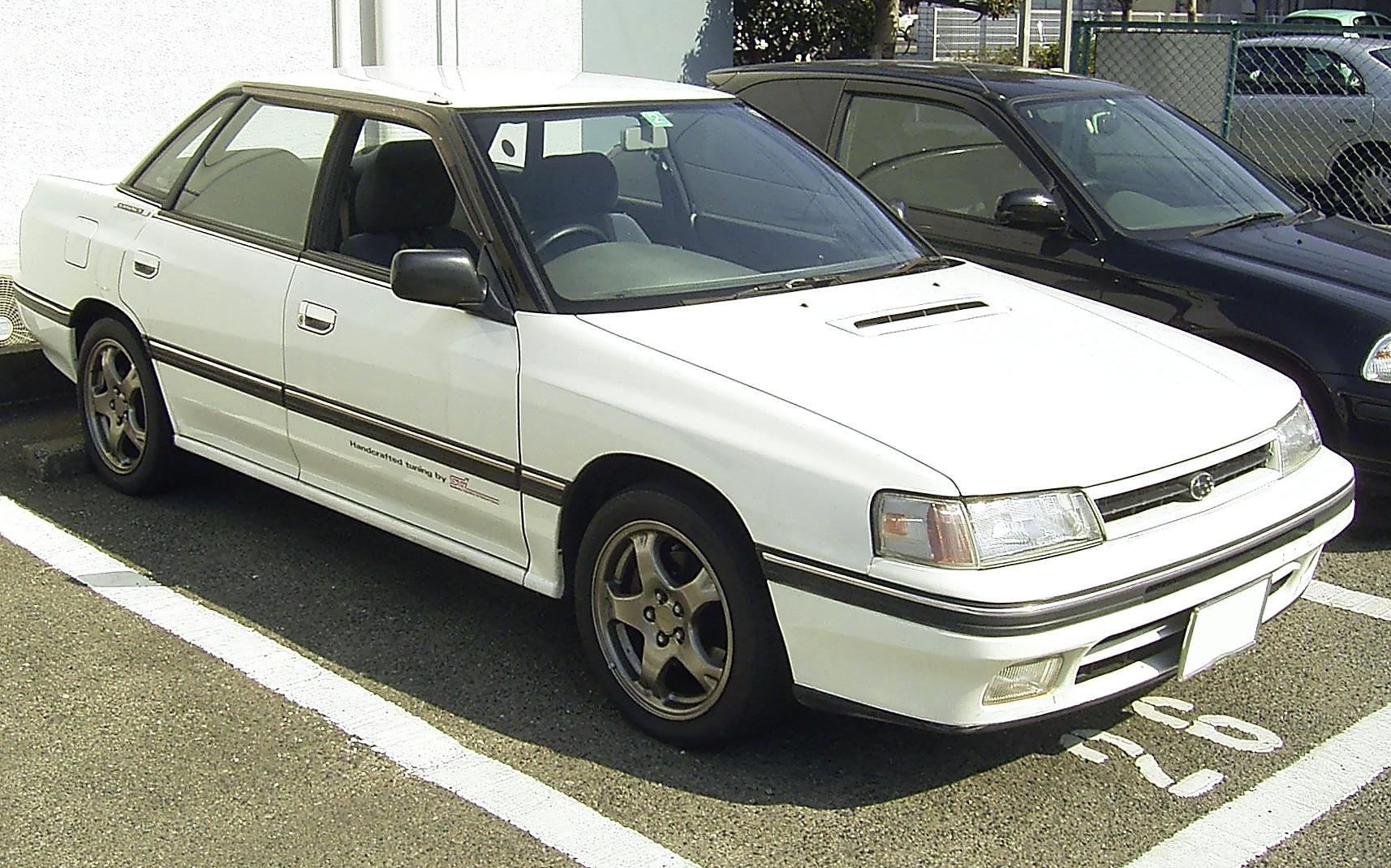
Subaru Legacy RS Type RA

One of the first activities that STi carried out was setting the world record for 100,000 km (62,000 mi) endurance driving using a fleet of three modified Subaru Legacy RS sedans, averaging 223.345 km/h (138.780 mph) over most of January 1989. The founder of STi, Noriyuki Koseki, coordinated the FIA World Land Endurance Record attempt and drove one of the cars. The Legacy RS used a 2.0-liter EJ20 turbo engine; STi modified the record-setting cars by tuning the suspension and improving the aerodynamics. That November, Subaru began marketing an upgraded Legacy RS with many of the same STi modifications as the Legacy RS Type RA (Record Attempt), limited to a production run of 100 examples. Low-volume Type RA production continued after that initial model, and in 1992 the Legacy Touring Wagon STi was marketed with similar modifications.

=== World Rally Championship ===
Subarus driven by Colin McRae

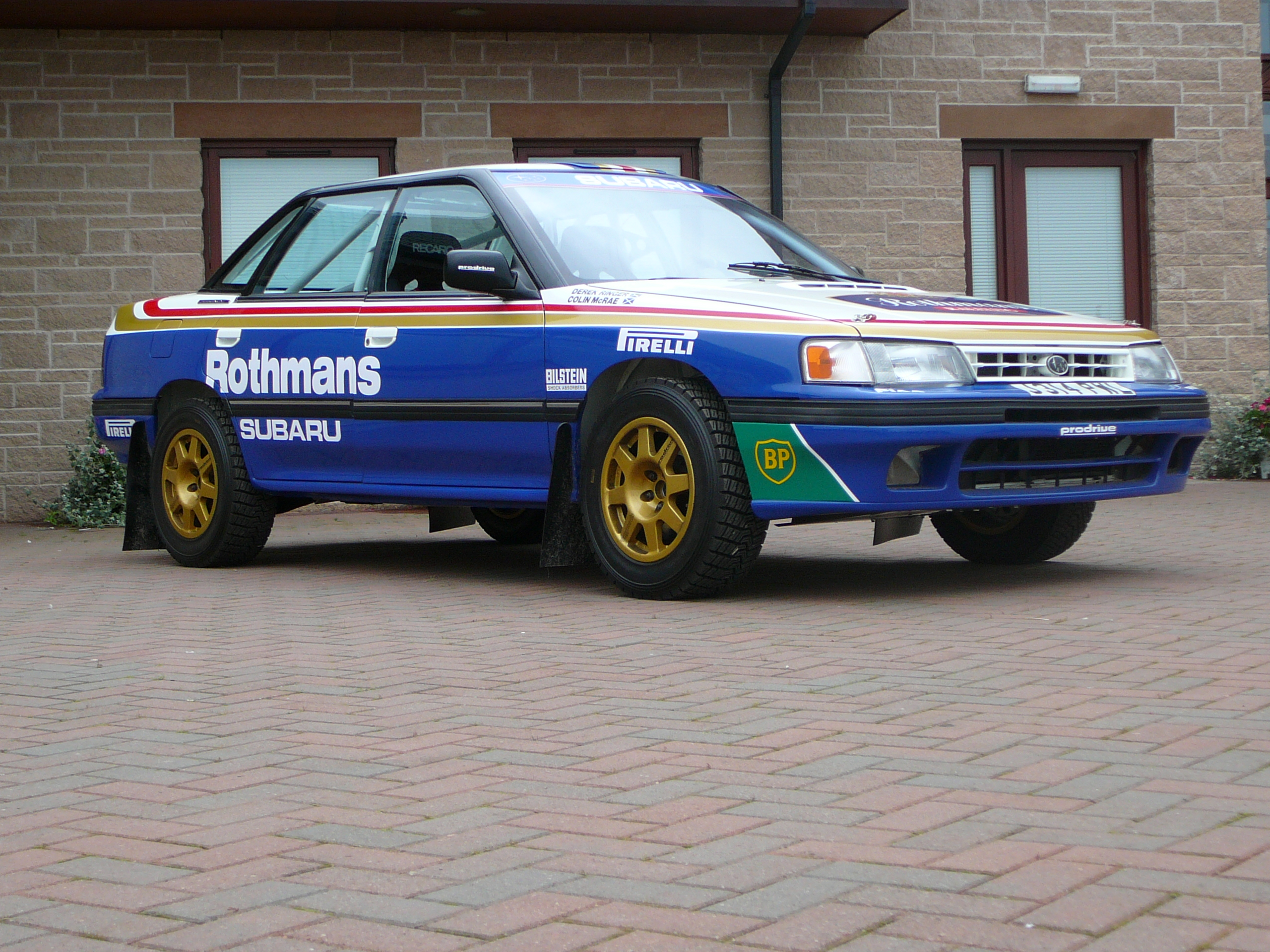
1992 Prodrive/STi Legacy RS

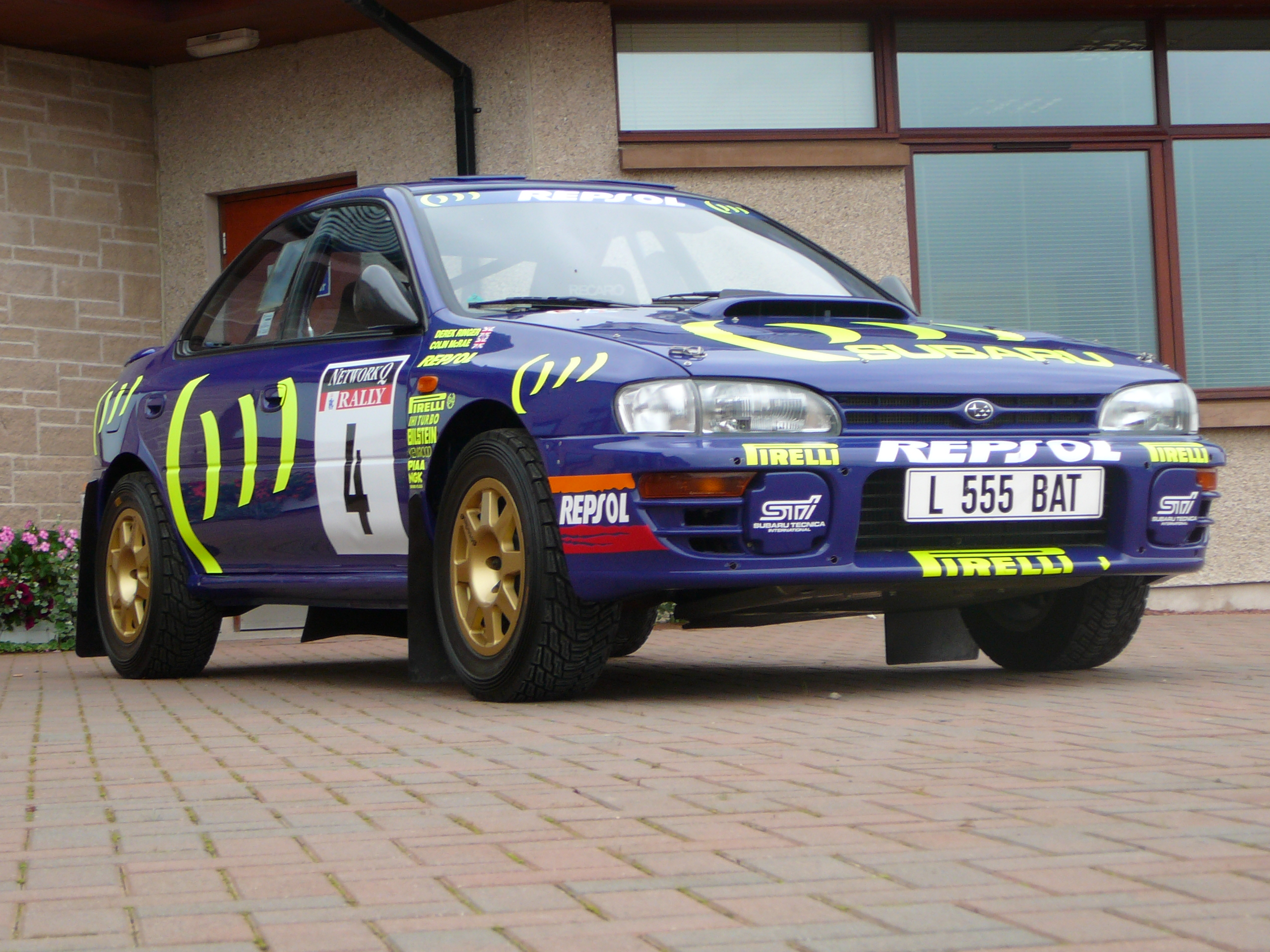
1995 Prodrive/STi Impreza 555

Subaru had participated in WRC races since 1980, albeit with limited success by 1988, when STi was founded. Subaru first campaigned the Prodrive-developed Legacy RS in the 1990 WRC season, finishing fourth in the constructor's standings that year. Despite adding Colin McRae to the Subaru World Rally Team in 1991 and winning three straight British Rally Championships from 1991 to 1993 (McRae/Ringer, 1991–92; Burns/Reid 1993) the Legacy RS did not win an individual WRC race until the 1993 Rally New Zealand (McRae/Ringer).

In 1992, with its rally competitors fielding smaller and lighter automobiles, Subaru began to sell the Impreza WRX (World Rally eXperimental) and homologated it for Group A as the Impreza 555; a Prodrive-modified Impreza 555 was campaigned starting with the 1994 WRC season and the new WRC car immediately achieved a podium finish on its debut, with Ari Vatanen coming second at the 1993 1000 Lakes Rally. The Impreza 555 featured a 2.0-litre intercooled turbocharged engine with 250 horsepower, upgraded suspension that could take on more aggressive potholes and jumps, as well as a short shifting transmission which made switching gears more accessible and quicker.

Like the Legacy RS before it, an Impreza WRX Type RA was marketed in Japan for 1992; the RA deleted power windows, air conditioning, and the anti-lock braking system. In 1994, Subaru introduced the WRX STi; the STi were taken from the regular production line and modified to improve output and stiffen the chassis compared to the regular WRX. Meanwhile in the WRC, the Impreza 555 gave Subaru the Constructor's Championship in the World Rally Championship for three consecutive years between 1995 and 1997.

STi introduced the first of what it would eventually call its "S-line" of limited production cars in 1998, celebrating its consecutive streak of WRC constructor's championships as well as the 40th anniversary of Subaru: the 22B was limited to just 400 cars, reportedly selling out in 30 minutes. The 22B was followed by a string of limited production special editions of the WRX STi with outputs that exceeded the Japanese car manufacturers' "gentleman's agreement" to keep output below 280 PS (276 hp; 206 kW): S201 (2000), S202 (2002), S203 (2004), and S204 (2005).

At the end of 2008, Subaru announced that it would withdraw from the WRC starting with the 2009 season, citing the 2008 financial crisis.

=== Nürburgring 24 Hours ===
STI first competed in the annual Nürburgring 24 Hours race in 2008. Prior to that, Subaru had used the Nordschleife circuit to prove its production models since 1992. The WRX STI was first raced at the track's 24 Hours event in 2005 by a private team, finishing 14th overall and 2nd in its class. In 2008, the first factory-backed entry finished 57th overall and 5th in the SP6 class. For 2009, STI switched to the SP3T class (production cars equipped with a turbo engine with a displacement of 2-litres or less) and finished 33rd overall, 5th in the SP3T class.

Ahead of the 2010 event, driver Tommi Mäkinen drove a prototype WRX STI (GVB, widebody sedan), covering a Nordschleife lap in 7 minutes 55 seconds; the car was specially prepared with a lightweight aluminum bonnet and a larger turbo from the R205 production car. That year STI campaigned the WRX STI (GRB, widebody hatchback) to 24th overall and 4th in the SP3T class. In 2011, STI claimed the SP3T class title and finished 21st overall. That year, the S206 was released with a limited-production NBR (Nürburgring) Challenge Package, which replaced the steel roof with one made of carbon fiber, and was equipped with a special unfinished ("dry") carbon rear wing.

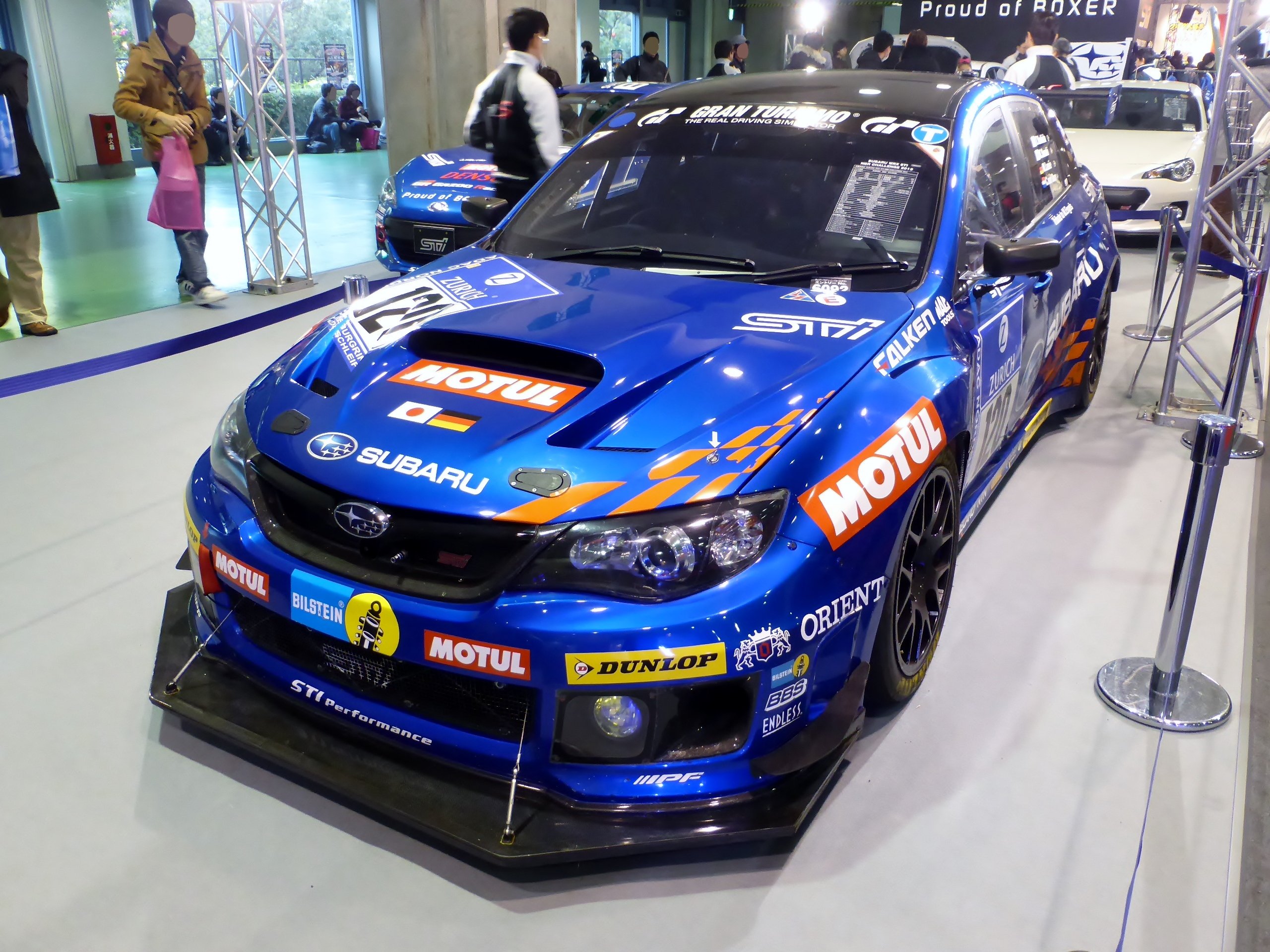
2013 NBR 24H race car

STI repeated as the SP3T class champion in 2012, but finished second in 2013 (26th overall). With the next generation of the WRX STI (VA) debuting in 2014, STI finished 4th in class, 32nd overall. Subaru took its third SP3T class win in 2015, finishing 18th overall, and repeated as SP3T class champions in 2016.

Subaru were unable to repeat their title in 2017, with the car forced to retire due to a fire in the engine compartment; at the time, the team were in second place within the class. The team won its fifth and sixth SP3T class championships in 2018 (62nd overall) and 2019 (18th overall).

Due to the difficulties of racing overseas during the COVID-19 pandemic, Subaru withdrew from the 2020 and 2021 races. Subaru entered the 2022 Nürburgring 24-Hour Race, held in late May, but was forced to retire before the end of the race due to a tire blowout leading to a crash. Before the crash, the WRX STI NBR Challenge 2022 was in second place for the SP3T class.

=== SUPER GT ===
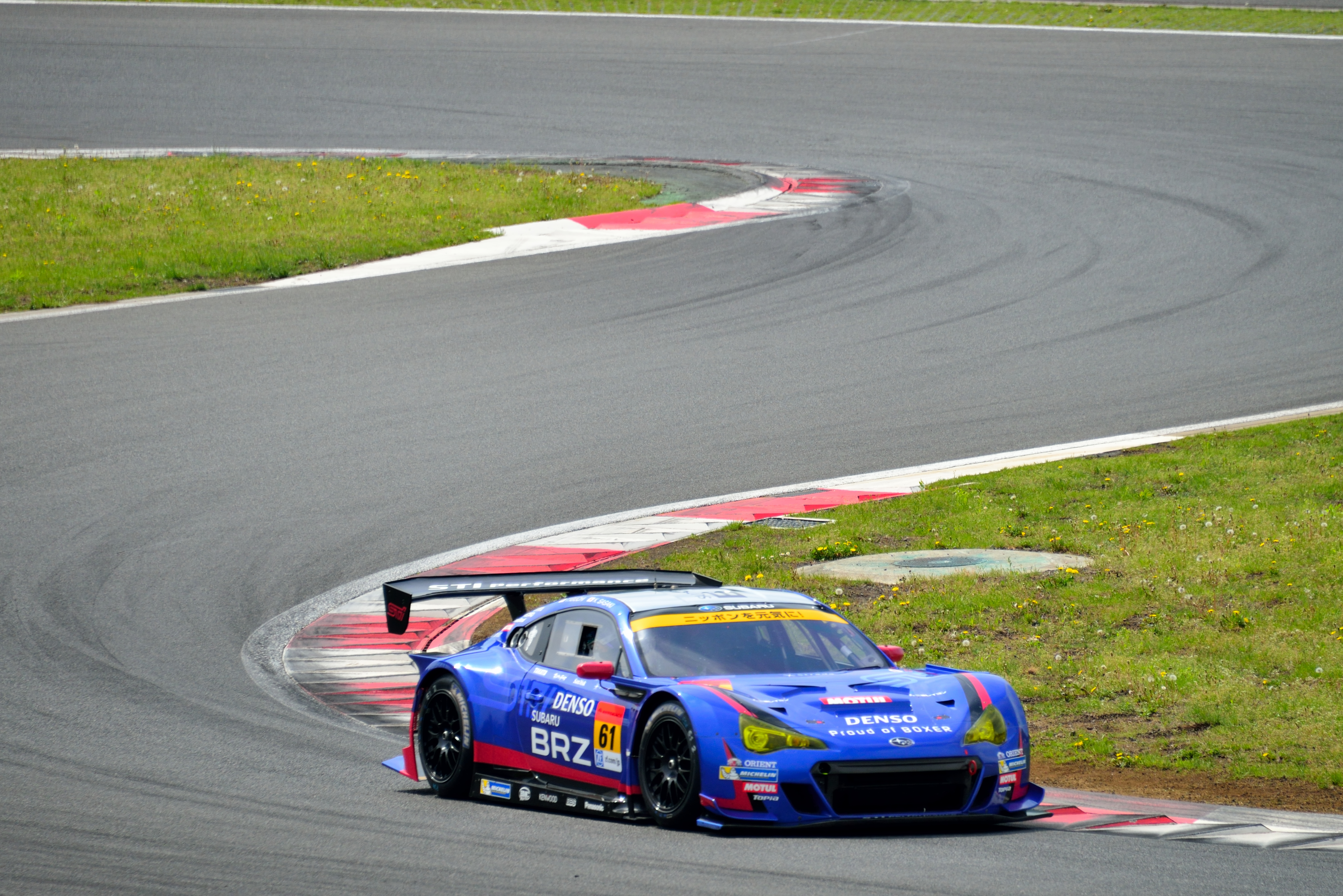
BRZ GT300 at Fuji (SUPER GT Round 2, 2014)

STI also participates in the GT300 class of the Super GT series, campaigning the Legacy B4 GT300 starting in 2009, then switching to the BRZ GT300 from 2012 onward. In 2021, Subaru won the series championship with the updated BRZ GT300. Previously, the Subaru team's best finishes were fourth place (in 2011 and 2013).

=== Future development ===
At the 2022 Tokyo Auto Salon, Subaru unveiled the STI E-RA Concept, an all-wheel drive two-seat racing car developed by STI. The STI E-RA Concept is equipped with a carbon fiber body and four electric motors, one at each wheel, enabling torque vectoring by varying the output of each motor; the aggregate maximum power output is 800 kW (1,073 hp) and 1,100 N⋅m (811 lb⋅ft) of torque, 200 kW (270 hp) per motor. The motors were developed and manufactured by Yamaha Motor Company. Because the car was designed to meet the requirements of the FIA Electric GT Championship, which at the time was scheduled to hold its inaugural season in 2023, the automotive press speculated that STI intended to campaign the E-RA, which would have required the car to be homologated with a street-legal version under GT3 rules.

== Subaru models with STI trim ==
STI versions of the Impreza, Forester and the Legacy have been marketed as limited edition vehicles in certain markets. STI also designs upgraded parts, mostly suspension related, for use on other Subaru vehicles.

The Subaru Impreza WRX and the Subaru Legacy B4 both come in high performance STI editions (formerly capitalized "STi" before the 2006 model year), designed by STI. The STI offers many advantages over the WRX, such as a six-speed manual transmission (different from the 2015+ WRX 6MT) with a helical (Suretrac in '04 models) limited slip front differential, driver controlled center differential(DCCD), IHI VF39 turbocharger (VF43 in 2007, VF48 from 2008 on), BBS lightweight alloy wheels, a mechanical rear limited slip differential and Brembo brakes. The WRX STI has Recaro style bucket seats and a MOMO steering wheel.

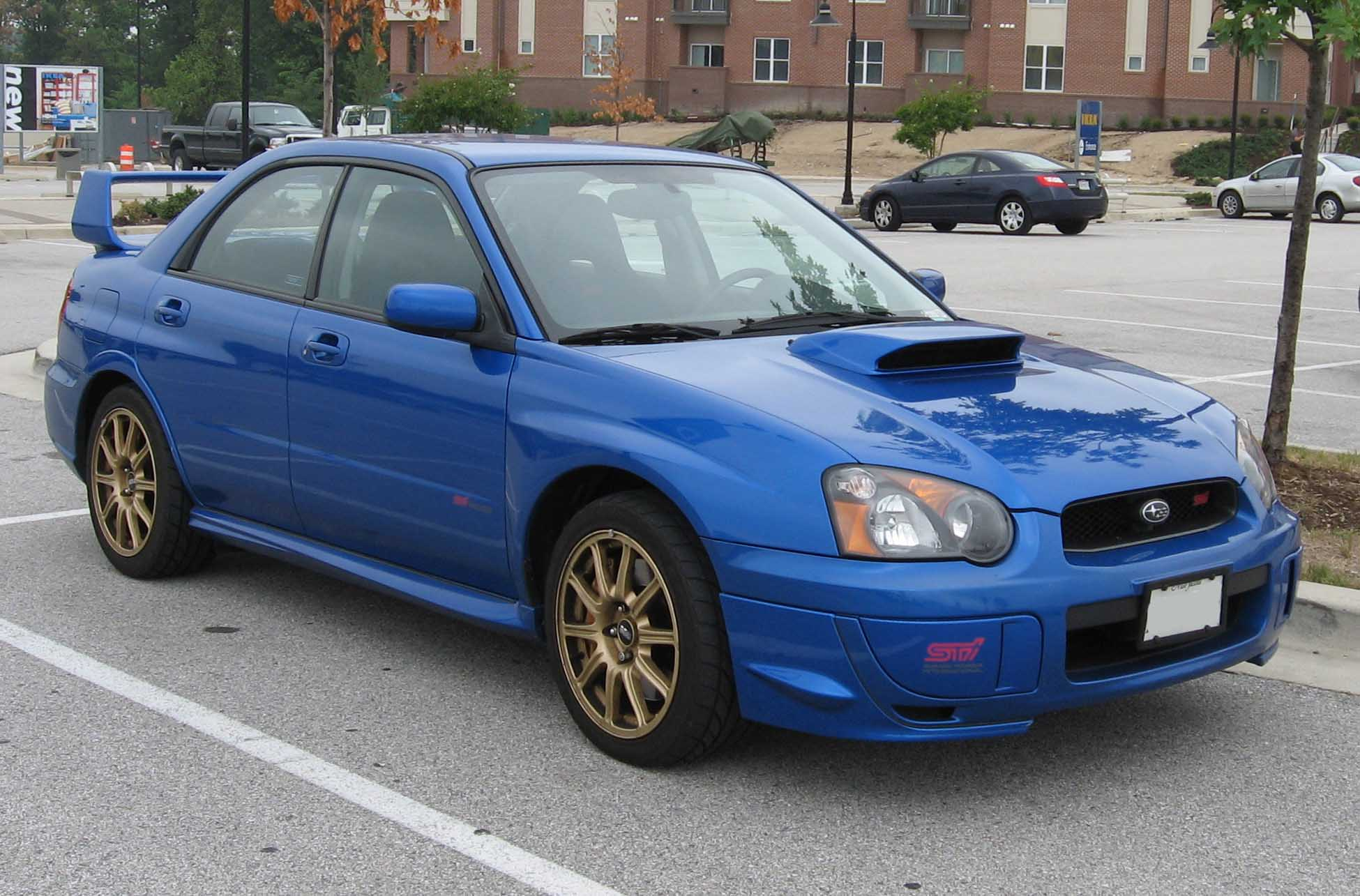
2005 model STi

The WRX STI was the first and so far only STI vehicle made available to North American consumers. While the WRX was first released for the North American market in 2001 for the 2002 model year, the limited production Impreza WRX STI sedan with 300 hp and 300 foot pounds of torque did not hit the market until 2004, and the USDM version having a number of changes when compared to the JDM - most notably the 2.5L EJ257 as opposed to the 2.0L EJ207 found in the JDM Spec model. This had a base price tag between $35,000-$40,000.

STI also released Legacys kitted out in full STI trim. These are rare and sought after by Subaru enthusiasts, and marketed as 'Tuned by STi' They were only released new in Japan (JDM) and New Zealand (NZDM) this has been throughout the 2005-2007 Legacys. The higher performance 'STI Legacys' are produced in limited numbers for the Japanese Market only and are known as S-Line, (see more below) similar to what has been carried out in the Impreza model range. Starting with the S401 in 2002 which was based on a BES Legacy Sedan RSK (400 Produced) and the S402 in 2008, based on the BL/BP Legacy (402 Produced). Both of these had 6MT Transmissions, EJ20 in the S401 and EJ25 in the S402. STi has also put its name on a number of other Subaru models, using the 'Ts' moniker, these are largely sold in Japan only and have STi branded interior parts, strut braces and occasionally suspension components. In 2016 an STI kit was built for the redesigned Crosstrek models which included STI branded wheels, hatchback spoiler, and shift knobs for both automatic and manual variants.

STI also released the STI Forester firstly based on the SF5 variant in 2001, this was called the Forester STI II Type M. This was limited to 800 Units, and had an increase of power to 250PS, utilizing a special ECU. Special struts and coil springs were installed and its brakes were modified to large diameters; 16 inches in the front and 14 in the rear, while a brake-cooling duct was also added to the front bumper. 17-inch forged aluminium wheels by RAYS were fitted together with 225/45R17 tyres. As for the exterior, special front and rear bumpers, large rear spoiler, and side under spoilers were also attached. The interior featured a MOMO leather sport steering wheel (with cherry red stitching), and a leather bound shift knob and brake lever. Its suede effect seat fabric was even embossed with the STI logo. There was also another STi Forester released in 2005 using the SG Chassis. This used the EJ257 Engine.

Some Subaru enthusiasts have requested that the manufacturer install the STI engine in the BRZ to provide extra power, but there is concern that a more powerful BRZ would compete directly with the WRX. Drawings of a BRZ STI exist online and concepts have been shown at auto shows, but Subaru has yet to release an official statement.

=== S-line ===
The highest-performance automobiles sold by Subaru are limited-production models tuned by STI and designated as the "S-line". There is also a line of limited-production cars with upgraded performance noted as "tuned by STI" or "tS".

S-line automobiles from STI
Model	Impreza 22B-STI Version	Impreza S201	Forester STI II Type M	Legacy S401 STI Version	Impreza S202
Image	Subaru Impreza 22B-STI Version, a high-performance variant of the standard Subaru Impreza coupe. This photo shows the front of the car, which is blue with gold-colored wheels and a pink Subaru emblem.			Subaru Legacy S401 STI Version, a high-performance variant of the standard Subaru Legacy sedan. This photo shows the front of the car, which is blue; there is a "S401" badge on the front grille.	Subaru Impreza S202, a high-performance variant of the standard Subaru Impreza WRX sedan. This photo shows the front of the car, which is yellow; there is a "S202" badge on the front grille.
Year	1998	2000	2001	2002	
Units	400	300	800	400	400
Engine	EJ22G	EJ20			
Transmission	5MT			6MT	
Curb weight	1,270 kg 2,800 lb		1,410 kg 3,110 lb	1,520 kg 3,350 lb	1,330 kg 2,930 lb
Power @ rpm	206 kW; 280 PS; 276 hp @6000	221 kW; 300 PS; 296 hp @6500	184 kW; 250 PS; 247 hp @6000	216 kW; 294 PS; 290 hp @6400	235 kW; 320 PS; 315 hp @6400
Torque @ rpm	363 N⋅m; 37.0 kg⋅m; 268 lb⋅ft @3200	353 N⋅m; 36.0 kg⋅m; 260 lb⋅ft @4000	309 N⋅m; 31.5 kg⋅m; 228 lb⋅ft @4000	343 N⋅m; 35.0 kg⋅m; 253 lb⋅ft @4400	384 N⋅m; 39.2 kg⋅m; 283 lb⋅ft @4400
Model	Impreza S203	Legacy tuned by STI	S204	Legacy tuned by STI	Impreza WRX STI spec C Type RA-R
Image	Subaru Impreza S203, a high-performance variant of the standard Subaru Impreza sedan. This photo shows the front of the car, which is white; there is a "S203" badge on the front grille.				Subaru Impreza WRX STI spec C Type RA-R, a high-performance variant of the standard Subaru Impreza sedan. This photo shows the front of the car, which is yellow with white wheels.
Year	2004	2005		2006	
Units	555	600	600	600	300
Engine	EJ20				
Transmission	6MT	E-5AT / 5MT	6MT	E-5AT / 6MT	6MT
Curb weight	1,445 kg 3,186 lb	1,430–1,480 kg 3,150–3,260 lb	1,450 kg 3,200 lb	1,480–1,500 kg 3,260–3,310 lb	1,390 kg 3,060 lb
Power @ rpm	235 kW; 320 PS; 315 hp @6400	E-5AT: 191 kW; 260 PS; 256 hp @6000 5MT: 206 kW; 280 PS; 276 hp @6400	235 kW; 320 PS; 315 hp @6400	E-5AT: 191 kW; 260 PS; 256 hp @6000 6MT: 206 kW; 280 PS; 276 hp @6400	235 kW; 320 PS; 315 hp @6400
Torque @ rpm	422 N⋅m; 43.0 kg⋅m; 311 lb⋅ft @4400	343 N⋅m; 35.0 kg⋅m; 253 lb⋅ft @2400	432 N⋅m; 44.1 kg⋅m; 319 lb⋅ft @4400	343 N⋅m; 35.0 kg⋅m; 253 lb⋅ft @2000 (E-5AT) or @2400 (6MT)	432 N⋅m; 44.1 kg⋅m; 319 lb⋅ft @4400
Model	Legacy tuned by STI	S402	Impreza WRX STI 20th Anniversary	Exiga 2.0GT tuned by STI	WRX STI tS
Image	Subaru Legacy tuned by STI, a high-performance variant of the standard Subaru Legacy station wagon. This photo shows the front of the car, which is blue.	Subaru Legacy S402 sedan, a high-performance variant of the standard Subaru Legacy sedan. This photo shows the front of the car, which is blue; there is a "S402" badge on the front grille.		Subaru Exiga 2.0GT tuned by STI, a high-performance variant of the standard Subaru Exiga minivan. This photo shows the front of the car, which is white; the rear hatch is open.	Subaru WRX STI tS, a lightened variant of the standard Subaru WRX STI sedan. This photo shows the front of the car, which is white; the car has been lightened by replacing the standard roof panel with carbon fiber, which is visible.
Year	2007	2008		2009	2010
Units	600	402	300	300	300
Engine	EJ20	EJ25	EJ20		EJ20 (6MT) / EJ25 (E-5AT)
Transmission	E-5AT / 6MT	6MT		E-5AT	E-5AT / 6MT
Curb weight	1,480–1,500 kg 3,260–3,310 lb	1,490–1,520 kg 3,280–3,350 lb	1,480 kg 3,260 lb	1,610 kg 3,550 lb	1,470–1,480 kg 3,240–3,260 lb
Power	E-5AT: 191 kW; 260 PS; 256 hp @6000 6MT: 206 kW; 280 PS; 276 hp @6400	210 kW; 290 PS; 280 hp @5600	227 kW; 309 PS; 304 hp @6400	165 kW; 224 PS; 221 hp @5600	E-5AT: 221 kW; 300 PS; 296 hp @6200 6MT: 227 kW; 309 PS; 304 hp @6400
Torque	343 N⋅m; 35.0 kg⋅m; 253 lb⋅ft @2000 (E-5AT) or @2400 (6MT)	392 N⋅m; 40.0 kg⋅m; 289 lb⋅ft @2000	422 N⋅m; 43.0 kg⋅m; 311 lb⋅ft @4400	326 N⋅m; 33.2 kg⋅m; 240 lb⋅ft @4400	E-5AT: 350 N⋅m; 36 kg⋅m; 260 lb⋅ft @2800; 6MT: 430 N⋅m; 44 kg⋅m; 320 lb⋅ft @3200
Model	Legacy tS	R205	Forester tS	S206	Legacy tS
Image	Subaru Legacy tS, a high-performance variant of the standard Subaru Legacy sedan. This photo shows the front of the car, which is white; there is a "tS" badge on the front grille which stands for "tuned by STI".		Subaru Forester tS, a high-performance variant of the standard Subaru Forester. This photo shows the front of the car, which is white; there is a "tS" badge on the front grille which stands for "tuned by STI".	Subaru WRX STI S206, a high-performance variant of the standard Subaru WRX STI sedan. This photo shows the front of the car, which is blue; there is a "S206" badge on the front grille.	
Year	2010			2011	2012
Units	600	400	300	300	300
Engine	EJ25	EJ20	EJ25	EJ20	FB25
Transmission	E-5AT / 6MT	6MT	E-5AT	6MT	Lineartronic
Curb weight	1,470–1,540 kg 3,240–3,400 lb	1,470 kg 3,240 lb	1,540 kg 3,400 lb	1,470 kg 3,240 lb	1,500–1,540 kg 3,310–3,400 lb
Power @ rpm	210 kW; 290 PS; 280 hp @6000	235 kW; 320 PS; 315 hp @6400	193 kW; 262 PS; 259 hp @6000	235 kW; 320 PS; 315 hp @6400	127 kW; 173 PS; 170 hp @5600
Torque @ rpm	350 N⋅m; 36 kg⋅m; 260 lb⋅ft @2000	432 N⋅m; 44.1 kg⋅m; 319 lb⋅ft @4400	347 N⋅m; 35.4 kg⋅m; 256 lb⋅ft @2800	431 N⋅m; 43.9 kg⋅m; 318 lb⋅ft @4400	235 N⋅m; 24.0 kg⋅m; 173 lb⋅ft @4100
Model	Exiga tS	BRZ tS	WRX STI tS Type RA	Forester tS	BRZ tS
Image	Subaru Exiga tS, a high-performance variant of the standard Subaru Exiga minivan. This photo shows the front of the car, which is white with a small "tS" emblem on the front grille, which stands for "tuned by Subaru".	Subaru BRZ tS, a high-performance variant of the standard Subaru BRZ coupe. This photo shows the front of the car, which is blue with a small "tS" emblem on the front grille, which stands for "tuned by Subaru".	Subaru WRX STI tS type RA ("Record Attempt"), a higher-performance variant of the Subaru WRX STI sedan. This photo shows the rear of the car, which is orange with a small "tS" emblem on the right hand side.	Subaru Forester STI tS, a higher-performance variant of the Subaru Forester. This photo shows the front of the car, which is blue with a small "STI" emblem on the front grille.	Subaru BRZ tS, a high-performance variant of the standard Subaru BRZ coupe. This photo shows the front of the car, which is yellow with a small "STI" emblem on the front grille.
Year	2012	2013		2014	2015
Units	300	500	300	300	300
Engine	EJ20	FA20	EJ20	FA20	
Transmission	E-5AT	6MT / E-6AT	6MT	Lineartronic	6MT / E-6AT
Curb weight	1,620 kg 3,570 lb	1,240–1,270 kg 2,730–2,800 lb	1,450 kg 3,200 lb	1,620 kg 3,570 lb	1,240–1,260 kg 2,730–2,780 lb
Power @ rpm	165 kW; 224 PS; 221 hp @5600	147 kW; 200 PS; 197 hp @7000	227 kW; 309 PS; 304 hp @6400	206 kW; 280 PS; 276 hp @5700	147 kW; 200 PS; 197 hp @7000
Torque @ rpm	326 N⋅m; 33.2 kg⋅m; 240 lb⋅ft @4400	205 N⋅m; 20.9 kg⋅m; 151 lb⋅ft @6400	430 N⋅m; 44 kg⋅m; 320 lb⋅ft @3200	350 N⋅m; 36 kg⋅m; 260 lb⋅ft @2000	205 N⋅m; 20.9 kg⋅m; 151 lb⋅ft @6400
Model	S207	WRX S4 tS	XV Hybrid tS	S208	Type RA-R
Image	Subaru S207, a high-performance variant of the Subaru WRX STI. This photo shows the front of the car, which is yellow with a small "S207" emblem on the front grille.	Subaru WRX S4 tS, a high-performance variant of the Subaru WRX. This photo shows the front of the car, which is blue with a small "STI" emblem on the front grille.	Subaru XV Hybrid tS, a high-performance variant of the Subaru XV Hybrid. This photo shows the front of the car, which is white with a small "STI" emblem on the front grille.	Subaru S208, a high-performance variant of the Subaru WRX STI. This photo shows the front of the car, which is blue with a small "S208" emblem on the front grille.	
Year	2015	2016		2017	2018
Units	400	Sep 15, 2016–Mar 12, 2017	Jul 28, 2016–Jan 22, 2017	450	500
Engine	EJ20	FA20	FB20	EJ20	
Transmission	6MT	Sports Lineartronic	Lineartronic	6MT	
Curb weight	1,510 kg 3,330 lb	1,550 kg 3,420 lb	1,540 kg 3,400 lb	1,510 kg 3,330 lb	1,480 kg 3,260 lb
Power @ rpm	241 kW; 328 PS; 323 hp @7200	221 kW; 300 PS; 296 hp @5600	110 kW; 150 PS; 150 hp @6000	242 kW; 329 PS; 325 hp @7200	
Torque @ rpm	431 N⋅m; 43.9 kg⋅m; 318 lb⋅ft @3200	400 N⋅m; 41 kg⋅m; 300 lb⋅ft @2000	196 N⋅m; 20.0 kg⋅m; 145 lb⋅ft @4200	432 N⋅m; 44.1 kg⋅m; 319 lb⋅ft @3200	
Model	S209	WRX S4 STI Sport#			
Image	Rear view of the Subaru WRX STI S209, a high-performance variant of the Subaru WRX STI. This model was marketed exclusively in the United States. This particular image shows a white car with a small "S209" badge on the rear trunk lid.	Subaru WRX S4 STI Sport, a high-performance variant of the Subaru WRX S4. This photo shows the front of the car, which is blue with a small "STI" emblem on the front grille.			
Year	2019	2020			
Units	209	300			
Engine	EJ25	FA20			
Transmission	6MT	Sports Lineartronix			
Curb weight	1,581 kg 3,485 lb	1,550 kg 3,420 lb			
Power @ rpm	254 kW; 346 PS; 341 hp @6400	221 kW; 300 PS; 296 hp @5600			
Torque @ rpm	450 N⋅m; 46 kg⋅m 330 lb⋅ft @3600	400 N⋅m; 41 kg⋅m; 300 lb⋅ft @2000			
