= ENS 700 Field =

Athletic and recreation field in San Diego, California

- SDSU Rugby Pitch
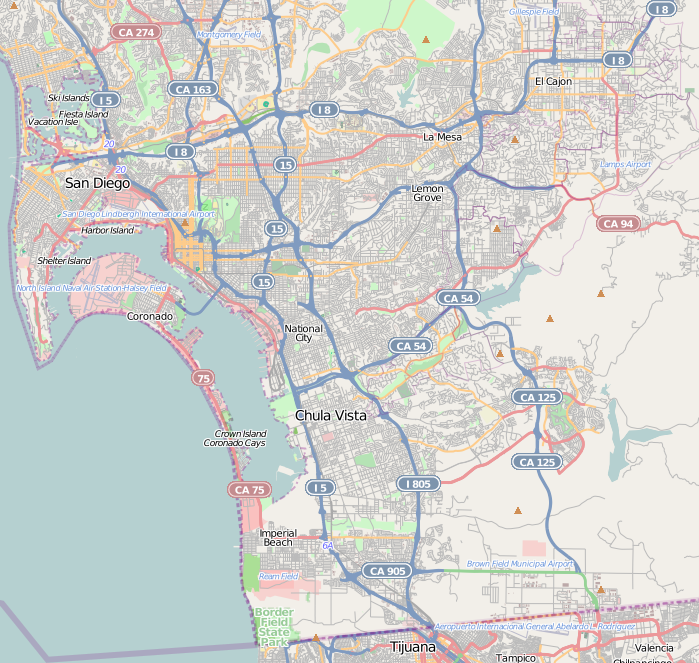
- Location in Southern San Diego Location in California Location in the United States
- Address: Campanile Mall
- Location: San Diego, California
- Coordinates: 32°46′25″N 117°04′22″W
- Owner: San Diego State University
- Operator: San Diego State University; Associated Students of SDSU
- Surface: Artificial turf
- Field size: 135 by 60 yards (123 m × 55 m)
- Acreage: 3 acres (1.2 ha)
- Public transit: San Diego Trolley; Green Line at SDSU Transit Center

Construction
- Groundbreaking: 1 May 2019
- Opened: 3 October 2019
- Cost: $5 million
- Architect: Ferguson Pape Baldwin Architects
- Builder: KTUA
- General contractor: Swinerton

Tenant
- San Diego State Aztecs (USA Rugby) (2019–present)

Website
- arc.sdsu.edu/ensfield

ENS 700 Field is a multipurpose athletic and recreation field in San Diego, California, located on the campus of San Diego State University (SDSU). Opened in 2019, it is the home of the San Diego State Aztecs Rugby Club teams. The men's team competes in Division 1-A in the California Conference; the women's team competes in Division II in the Pacific Desert Conference.

== History and construction ==
The site has always been a recreation field dating back to when San Diego State College first moved onto Montezuma Mesa at the beginning of the 1930s. In addition to being a recreation field, it was also initially the location of the college's baseball field (with home plate in the south-west corner). With the construction of the Music and Dance Department building on the north-west corner of the site, the baseball field was moved to the current site of Tony Gwynn Stadium, the baseball diamond was converted to softball and a row of tennis courts were constructed along the western edge of the site separating it from what was then Aztec Bowl and is now Viejas Arena. The tennis courts have since been demolished.

With continual upgrades, expansion and building projects on campus since the early 1930s, what was initially a field on the edge of campus had, over the intervening 90 years, become an eye-sore adjacent to the main entrance and en route to two of the most popular venues at the university, the Open Air Theatre and Viejas Arena. Additionally, close to a century of development in the College Area means that open space is now at a premium and there are no longer many areas where sport and recreation can take place; much of the available field space on campus is reserved for use by the athletic teams. It was proposed that the field be renovated to provide the student body with a suitable space for activity classes, recreation and sport-club use, as well as to improve the general appearance of the main pedestrian thoroughfare into the campus core.

The student body was polled in a referendum in the spring semester of 2018 and they approved a large-scale expansion and renovation of the Aztec Recreation Center (ARC) and existing recreational field space on campus. ENS 700 Field improvements were then approved by Associated Students on November 28, 2018 before the plans were reviewed by the Recreation and Wellness Commission in the spring of 2019 and approved. The works were conducted during the summer of 2019 finishing just in time for the fall semester that same year.

The project was awarded the American Public Works Association's Project of the Year for 2020.

== Features ==
One of the values of Associated Students (AS) at SDSU is sustainability, so all major AS projects must be built to be sustainable. The renovations to ENS 700 Field prioritized both student health and sustainability.

By choosing to replace the grass with artificial turf it is hoped to allow greater usage of the facility throughout the year. As the field was to be used for rugby it necessitated installing an underlay with maximised shock reduction to reduce injuries and also a specialized infill system that was much cooler than traditional turf products and required less maintenance. Associated Students also opted for a new environmentally sustainable turf technology

The sports lighting was specifically chosen based on sustainability, using highly focused vertical LED lighting that minimizes light spill and power consumption. The lights will also greatly expand the campus community's options for evening outdoor play and should also improve security by illuminating the central area which serves as a walkway for students going to and from their cars and the Recreation Center as well as visitors going to other athletic and entertainment venues on campus.

A new pedestrian path and landscape improvements are also part of the project. The landscape design creates a park-like setting around the field with seating built into curvilinear terrace walls. Stepped terraces for seating are utilized on the south side of the field in lieu of retaining walls to address the grade difference. The curvilinear terrace walls, along with the meandering decomposed granite path around the perimeter of the field, help soften the edges. Lawn and pavers within the terraces help break up the concrete steps and to provide additional seating areas. Planting along the perimeter preserves the existing trees, provides shade and softens the edges.
