= 1987 National Collegiate Rugby Championship =

American rugby tournament

Tournament details
- Tournament format(s): Knockout
- Date: May 2 – 3, 1987

Tournament statistics
- Teams: 4
- Matches played: 4

Final
- Venue: Pebble Beach, CA
- Champions: San Diego Sate (1st title)
- Runners-up: Air Force

The 1987 National Collegiate Rugby Championship was the eighth edition of the official national championship for intercollegiate rugby. The tournament took place concurrently with the 29th Pebble Beach Rugby Classic at Collins Polo Field in Pebble Beach, California. San Diego State won their first title with a victory over Air Force. Tom Sharpy of Air Force was the MVP.

== Venue ==
California
Collins Polo Field	1987 National Collegiate Rugby Championship is located in California
Pebble Beach, California	1987 National Collegiate Rugby Championship is located in California
Capacity:	1987 National Collegiate Rugby Championship is located in California

== Participants ==
Dartmouth
Qualified for the National Championship by advancing from the Eastern College Championship on April 18–19 in Blacksburg, VA.

- Dartmouth 32-0 Georgia Tech
- Dartmouth 6-3 Virginia Tech

Roster:
Coach- Keith Oberg, Greg Smith, Wayne Young
Captain- Jon Bigelow, Phillip McCune
Record-
Jon Bigelow (Flyhalf), Pat Brophy (Wing), Clay Corbus (Flanker), Al Dekin (Fullback), Al Golub (Center), John Hamlin (Center), John Harris (Prop), Greg Hawes (Flanker), Jay Henry (Wing), John Jakiemiec (Prop), Chris Lena (#8), Nick Leventas (Prop), Brett MacDonald (Wing), Charles Markwalde (Flanker), Phil McCone (Lock), Dave McConnell (Lock), Michael Silberling (Wing), David Silke (Lock), Larry Socher (Hooker), Bob Sproull (Scrumhalf), Vic Trautwein (Flanker), Eric Wiksten (Flanker).

Bowling Green
Qualified for the National Championship by winning the Midwest Universities Cup on April 18–19 in Dayton, OH.

- Bowling Green w/o Wisconsin-Platville
- Bowling Green 34-0 Ball State
- Bowling Green 34-3 Illinois State
- Bowling Green 26-25 Kentucky

Roster:
President- Dave Cramer
Coach- Roger Mazzerella, Sue Wilson
Captain- Mark Laimbeer
Record- 52-7-1(17-4)
Scott Ault (Center), Dallas Black (Flanker), Dan Burkholder (#8), Rob Clark (Wing), Dave Cramer (Prop), Ed Cvelbar (Prop), Chad Gaizutis (Center), Todd Haitz (Flanker), Tony Konczak (Center), Mark Laimbeer (Scrumhalf), Bret Level (Prop), John Lonsert (Fullback), Mark Manning (Lock), Steve Markert (Flyhalf), Dan Martello (Prop), Brian McCue (Lock), John Pugh (Hooker), Chris Round (Center), Gus Saponari (Center), Tom Schloemer (Flanker), Ed Smietana (Wing), Mike Sylvester (Flyhalf), Trent Tate (Lock), Carl Vella (Flanker), Andy Wasiniak (Lock), Jeff Weemhoff (Wing), Mike Yashnyk (Hooker), Nick Zelle (Wing).

Air Force
Qualified for the National Championship by winning the Western Collegiate Championship on April 18–19 in Colorado Springs, CO.

- Air Force 25-9 South Dakota
- Air Force 22-12 Oklahoma
- Air Force 19-10 Colorado

Roster:
Coach- Vern Francis, Walt Daniels, Barney Ballinger, Larry Coode, Jeff Waldo
Captains- Rick Coveno/Doug Woodbury
Record- 18-3-2
Matt Beals (Center), Mark Bissell (Fullback), Chris Burke (Center), Mike Carr (#8), Steve Clapp (Flanker), Rick Coveno (Hooker), John Davis (Lock), Dan Drummond (Lock), John Drummond (Prop), Chris Findall (Lock), John Finley (Scrumhalf), Roger Forsythe (Lock/#8), Steve Hajosy (Flyhalf), Rich Haller (Fullback), Ken Holliday (Prop), Jay Moad (Wing), Chris Nusser (Flanker), Dean Phillips (Prop), Alex Rossano (Hooker), Scott Savoie (Wing), Tom Sharpy (Flanker), Frank Souza (Center), Scott Stark (Wing), Doug Woodbury (Scrumhalf).

San Diego State
Qualified from Pacific Coast College Championships on April 10–11 in Santa Barbara, CA.

- San Diego State def. Arizona
- San Diego State 12-7 Humboldt State
- San Diego State 23-12 California

Roster:
Coach- Steve Gray, Loc Vetter
Captain-Dwayne Parker
Record- 28-1
Sean Allen (Hooker), John Bussari (Wing), Fabio Comana (Scrumhalf), Dave Crist (Fullback), Jim Detomasi (Wing/Center), Brett Erickson (Flanker), Matt Eshoo (#8), Kevin Fahlsing (Lock), Dennis Fitzpatrick (Flanker), Steve Forster (Flyhalf), Dennis Gonzales (Lock), Jerry Jerome (Flanker), Steve King (Wing/Fullback), Steve Klugerz (Lock), Chris Lippert (Prop), Alan Litvak (Lock), Dwayne Parker (Hooker), Jim Parker (Scrumhalf), Kevin Perry (Prop), Tom Pierce (Center), Chris Prell (Prop), Bruce Markey (Center), Steve Marshall (Prop), Warren Stanley (Flanker), Stuart Taylor (Lock), Chris Wakefield (Wing).

== Bracket ==
Regional Semifinal
April 19 - Dayton, OH
Bowling Green	34
Illinois State	3
April 19 - Dayton, OH
Kentucky	19
Penn State	13
April 18 - Colorado Springs, CO
Air Force	22
Oklahoma	12
April 18 - Colorado Springs, CO
Colorado	18
Kansas State	9
April 18 – Blacksburg, VA
Dartmouth	32
Georgia Tech	0
April 18 – Blacksburg, VA
Virginia Tech
Maryland
April 11 - Santa Barbara, CA
San Diego State	12
Humboldt State	7
April 11 - Santa Barbara, CA
California	50
Long Beach	3

Regional Final
April 19 - Dayton, OH
Bowling Green	26
Kentucky	25
April 19 - Colorado Springs, CO
Air Force	19
Colorado	10
April 19 – Blacksburg, VA
Dartmouth	6
Virginia Tech	3
April 11 - Santa Barbara, CA
San Diego State	23
California	12

National Semifinal
May 2 – Pebble Beach, CA
Bowling Green (Midwest)	8
Air Force (West)	15
May 2 – Pebble Beach, CA
Dartmouth (East)	6
San Diego State (Pacific)	22

National Final
May 3 – Pebble Beach, CA
Air Force	9
San Diego State	10
Third place
May 3 – Pebble Beach, CA
Bowling Green	19
Dartmouth	7

== Semifinals ==
2 May 1987
12:10 PM

Bowling Green	8–15	Air Force
Try: Rob Clark 15'; Jeff Weemhoff		Try: Jay Moad 76' c Con: Mark Bissell (1/1); Pen: Mark Bissell (3)

Collins Field, Pebble Beach, CA
Referee: Todd (NCRFU)

2 May 1987
1:45 PM

Dartmouth	6–22	San Diego State
Pen: Jon Bigelow (2)		Try: Steve Forster; Bruce Markey; Con: Steve Forster; Pen: Steve Forster (4)

Collins Field, Pebble Beach, CA
Referee: Ian Nixon (USARFU)

== Third place ==
3 May 1987

Bowling Green	19–7	Dartmouth
Try: Dan Burkholder; Carl Vella c Jeff Weemhoff c Con: Mark Laimbeer; Jon Konczak; Pen: Jon Konczak		Try: Charles Lena; Pen: Jon Bigelow

Collins Field, Pebble Beach, CA

== Final ==
3 May 1987
12:00 PM

Air Force	9–10	San Diego State
Try: Scott Stark 60' c Con: Mark Bissell (1/1); Pen: Mark Bissell		Try: Steve Forster 55'; Pen: 20' Steve Forster; 75' Steve Forster

Collins Field, Pebble Beach, CA
Attendance: 5000
Referee: Ian Nixon (USARFU)

== See also ==
1987 National Rugby Championships
