= Home (sports) =

Sports term for place identified with a team

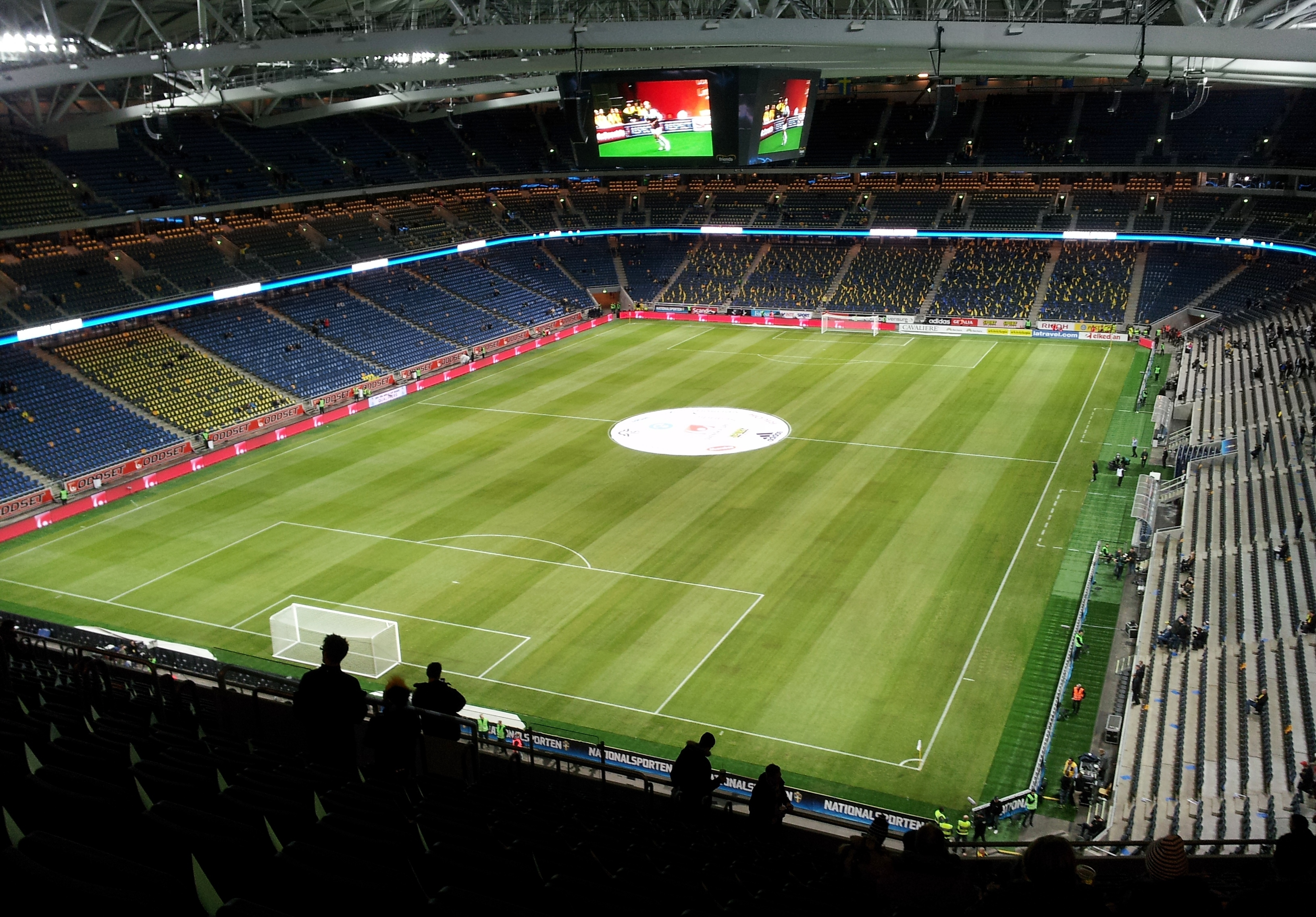
Friends Arena (in Solna, Sweden) from inside.

In sports, home is the place and venue identified with a sports team. Most professional teams are named for, and marketed to, particular metropolitan areas; amateur teams may be drawn from a particular region, or from institutions such as schools or universities. When they play in that venue, they are said to be the "home team"; when the team plays elsewhere, they are the away, visiting, or road team. Home teams wear home colors. In most sports, the home team benefits from a home field advantage, winning more frequently due to familiarity with the venue and having more fans cheering for it.

== Venue ==
Each team has a location where it practices during the season and where it hosts games. This is referred to as the home court, home field, home stadium, home ballpark, home arena, home ground, or home ice. When a team is serving as host of a contest, it is designated as the "home team". The event is described as a "home game" for that team and the venue that the game is being played is described as the "home field." In most sports, there is a home field advantage whereby the home team wins more frequently because it has a greater familiarity with the nuances of the venue and because it has more fans cheering for it, which supposedly gives the players adrenaline and an advantage. The opposing team is said to be the visiting team, the away team, or the road team.

In North American sports, a spectator can often tell which team is home by looking at the field of play. Often a home team logo, insignia or name is in the middle of the field, at center ice, midfield, or center court. Also, the logo, insignia or name may be found atop a dugout in baseball or in the end zone in American football. On television station scoreboards in North America, the home team and its score are usually displayed to the right of or below the road team's score, with the reverse being true for association football displays.

=== Exceptions ===
There are many examples of sports teams being forced to play their home games away from their usual home venue for a variety of reasons.

Damage to a venue can be a major reason. In World War II, English association football club Manchester United's home ground, Old Trafford, was so badly damaged by bombing that for eight years all their home games were played at Maine Road, the home of rivals Manchester City. Damage caused by Hurricane Katrina in 2005 forced American football team New Orleans Saints to play all of their games in the 2005 season away from their home stadium, the Louisiana Superdome.

Teams may be forced from their home stadiums for logistical and legal reasons. The COVID-19 pandemic impacted the pancontinental UEFA Champions League and UEFA Europa League association football tournaments. Varying travel bans and quarantining rules between different countries across Europe meant that many teams were forced to host their home games in a different country as their opponents would not be able to enter jurisdiction where the game was due to take place. For example, in March 2021 the government of Spain had imposed a ban on travellers arriving from the UK, so Atlético Madrid were forced to use Arena Nationala in Bucharest, Romania, to host English team Chelsea. In 2010 the Canadian baseball team Toronto Blue Jays played a home series with the Philadelphia Phillies in the Phillies' Citizens Bank Park while the G-20 Summit was being held near the Rogers Centre in Toronto.

In baseball, sometimes, when teams are playing a makeup game from an earlier game postponed by rain, the game may have to be made up in the other team's stadium. An example of this occurred on September 26, 2007, with a game between the Cleveland Indians, who were the "home" team, but the game was played vs. the Seattle Mariners in Safeco Field, in Seattle.

== Uniforms or kits ==
Rules and conventions often apply to the choice of home and away colors. In Australian football, the home team traditionally wears their regular jumper and black (or colored) shorts, while the away team wears a lighter coloured variant of their jumper and/or white shorts. In American football and ice hockey, most home teams often wear uniforms that feature their official team colors, whereas the visiting team wears white or colors opposite of the home team's choice. On the other hand, in baseball and basketball, the home team will typically choose to wear the lighter colored version of its uniform. Many teams have a home uniform which is mostly white and referred to as the "home whites".

The road team will generally wear a version of its uniform with one of the darker of its official colors as the main color, or in baseball with a grey main color referred to as the "road greys". The term "home whites" originated in the early days of Major League Baseball. Typically the visiting team had no access to laundry facilities and thus the players were unable to clean their uniforms on the road. By wearing grey or another dark color the visiting team was better able to conceal the dirt and grass stains that had accumulated on their uniforms over the course of the series. The home team, having access to laundry facilities, was able to wear clean white uniforms each day, hence the term "home whites".

== Homerism ==
In team sports, and especially international sports (home represented by the home country), a "home" crew is assigned to cover all the home games, and sometimes the "home" crew travels on the road to cover away games as well. While it is generally accepted that a home broadcasting crew will talk more about the familiar home players, they are still expected to provide objective commentary of the actual play on the field, especially with respect to analysis of contentious officiating decisions. When this line is crossed, crews are accused of being "homers" and/or displaying "homerism".

In contrast, national broadcasting crews, especially those at the top of their network's depth chart, are typically assigned to whatever games are expected to attract the largest broadcast audiences, and do not specifically cover particular teams. These crews are held to the highest standards of impartiality, and likely to come under intense criticism if they express any sort of favoritism toward individual teams and/or players.

In online fan forums, "homers" are participants for whom the home team can do no wrong, and the away team can do no right. This is cognate with extremist forms of partisan politics.

== See also ==
- Road (sports)
