= Claire Godwin =

American rugby union player

- Height: 1.68 m (5 ft 6 in)

Rugby union career
- Position: Flanker
Senior career
Years	Team	Apps	(Points)
	Florida State WRFC		(-)
International career
Years	Team	Apps	(Points)
- United States

Claire Godwin is a former American rugby union player. She was a member of the United States squad that won the inaugural 1991 Women's Rugby World Cup in Wales.

In the 1991 World Cup final, Godwin had conceded a penalty try to England which gave them an early lead. A brace of tries in the second half more than made up for her early offence and gave the United States the much-needed boost.

Godwin and the 1991 World Cup squad were inducted into the United States Rugby Hall of Fame in 2017.
