= Dan Payne (rugby union) =

US international rugby union player

- Born: September 12, 1972 (age 54) Victor, New York, United States
- Notable relative: Seth Payne (brother)

Rugby union career
- Position: Loose forward
International career
Years	Team	Apps	(Points)
2007	United States	2	(0)
- Correct as of 31 December 2020
Coaching career
- Years: Team
- 2006–2009: San Diego State Aztecs
- 2009–2016: Life University
- Correct as of July 5, 2016

Dan Payne (born September 12, 1972) is an American former rugby union player, coach, and college athletic director. He is chief executive officer for Rugby Americas, both North and South America.

Payne was born in Victor, New York. He attended college at Clarion University where he was an All-America wrestler. Payne did not play rugby in his youth, but discovered rugby in 1998 while living in New York. Payne then moved to San Diego where he played for the Old Mission Beach Athletic Club (OMBAC). Payne's position was number eight. He played for the United States national rugby union team, and played for the U.S. at the 2007 Rugby World Cup.

Payne coached for several years at San Diego State University. Payne has been the head coach since 2009 of Life University, which has been one of the strongest teams in college rugby since Life's undergraduate rugby program was created in 2009. Payne was promoted in 2014 to Assistant Athletics Director while still retaining his role as Director of Rugby. Payne has also served as an assistant coach for the U.S. national rugby team.

Payne was hired as chief executive officer for USA Rugby with his tenure beginning August 1, 2016. Payne described his motivation behind the job as increasing the awareness and participation for rugby in the U.S.

It was announced by World Rugby on April 23, 2018 that Dan had been appointed CEO of Rugby Americas, making him the senior World Rugby official in North and South America. Upon taking this new role, Dan stepped down as CEO of USA Rugby.

== See also ==
- College Premier Division
