= Subaru STI E-RA =

STI E-RA Concept
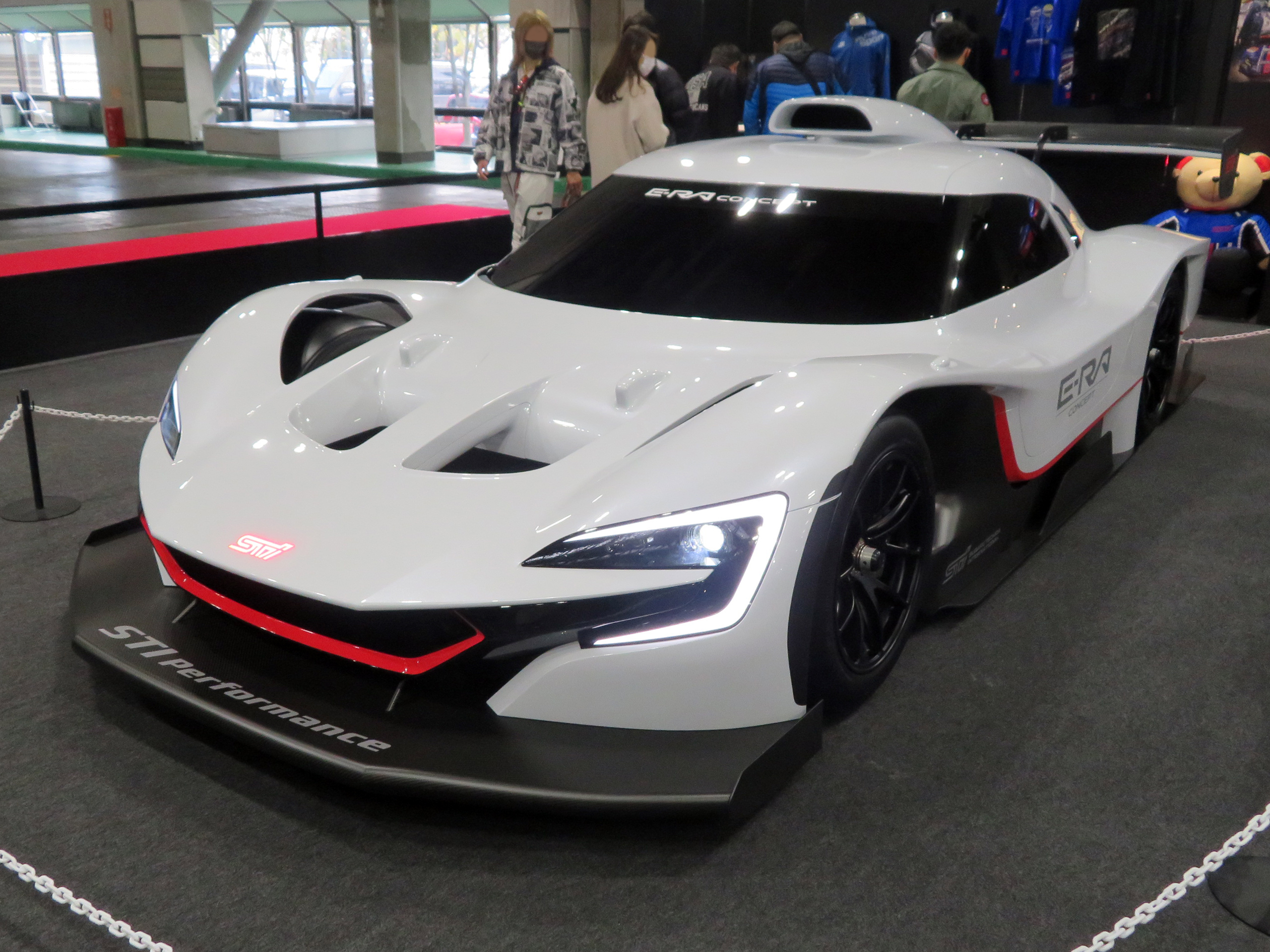
- At Osaka Auto Messe (Feb 2022)

Overview
- Manufacturer: Subaru Tecnica International
- Production: 2022

Powertrain
- Electric motor: 4× Yamaha IPMSM, 800 kW (1,100 hp) total output
- Battery: 60 kWh lithium-ion

Dimensions
- Wheelbase: 2,690 mm (105.9 in)
- Length: 5,010 mm (197.2 in)
- Width: 2,000 mm (78.7 in)
- Height: 1,310 mm (51.6 in)
- Curb weight: 1,690 kg (3,726 lb) (estimated)

The Subaru STI E-RA is a racing vehicle equipped with a battery-electric drivetrain. It was developed by Subaru's performance and racing division Subaru Tecnica International (STI). The car's initials stand for "Electric—Record Attempt", keeping with STI's tradition of designating its highest-performance models with the "RA" label; a concept car prototype debuted at the Tokyo Auto Salon in January 2022.

== Design ==
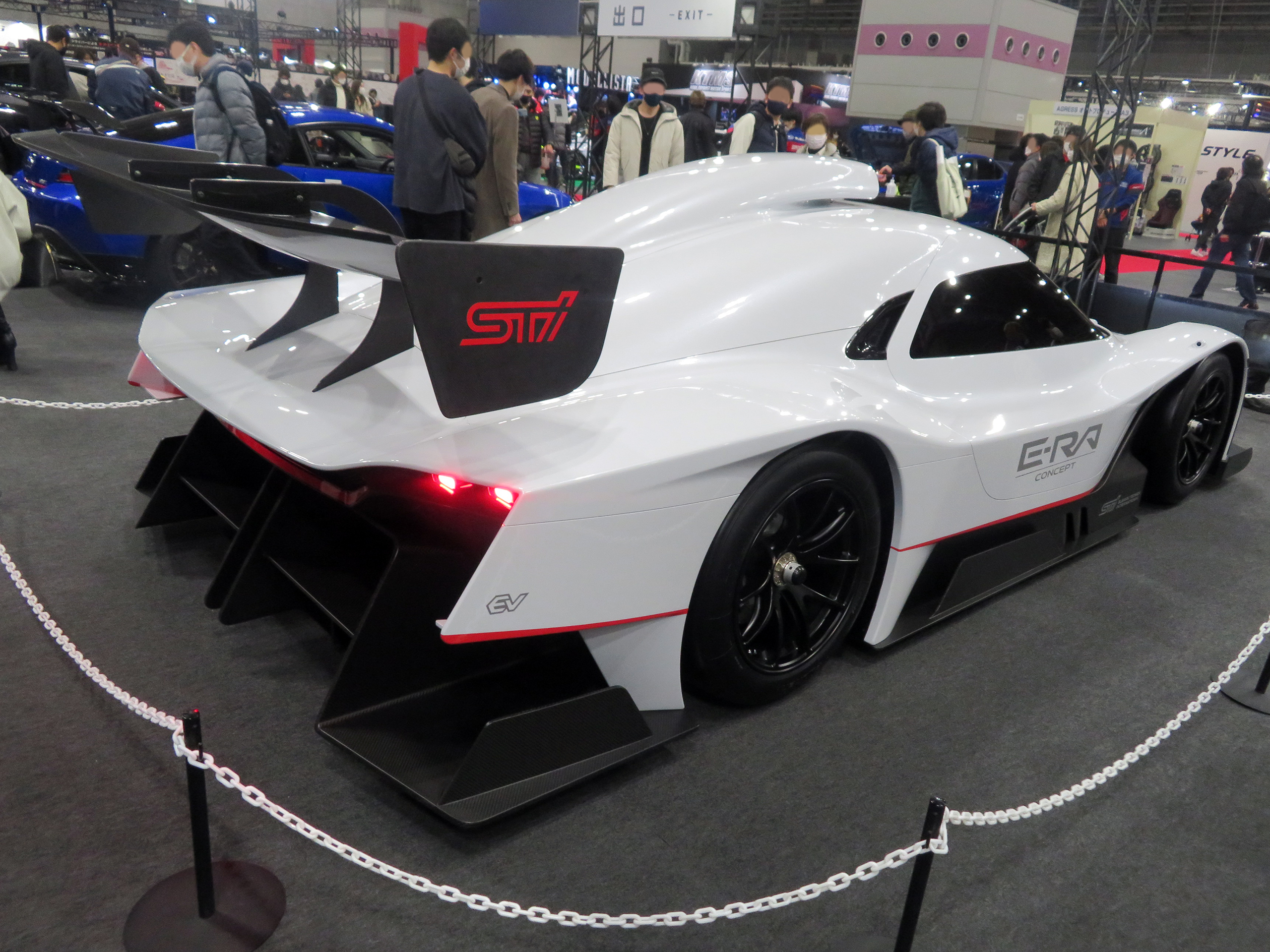
Rear side view

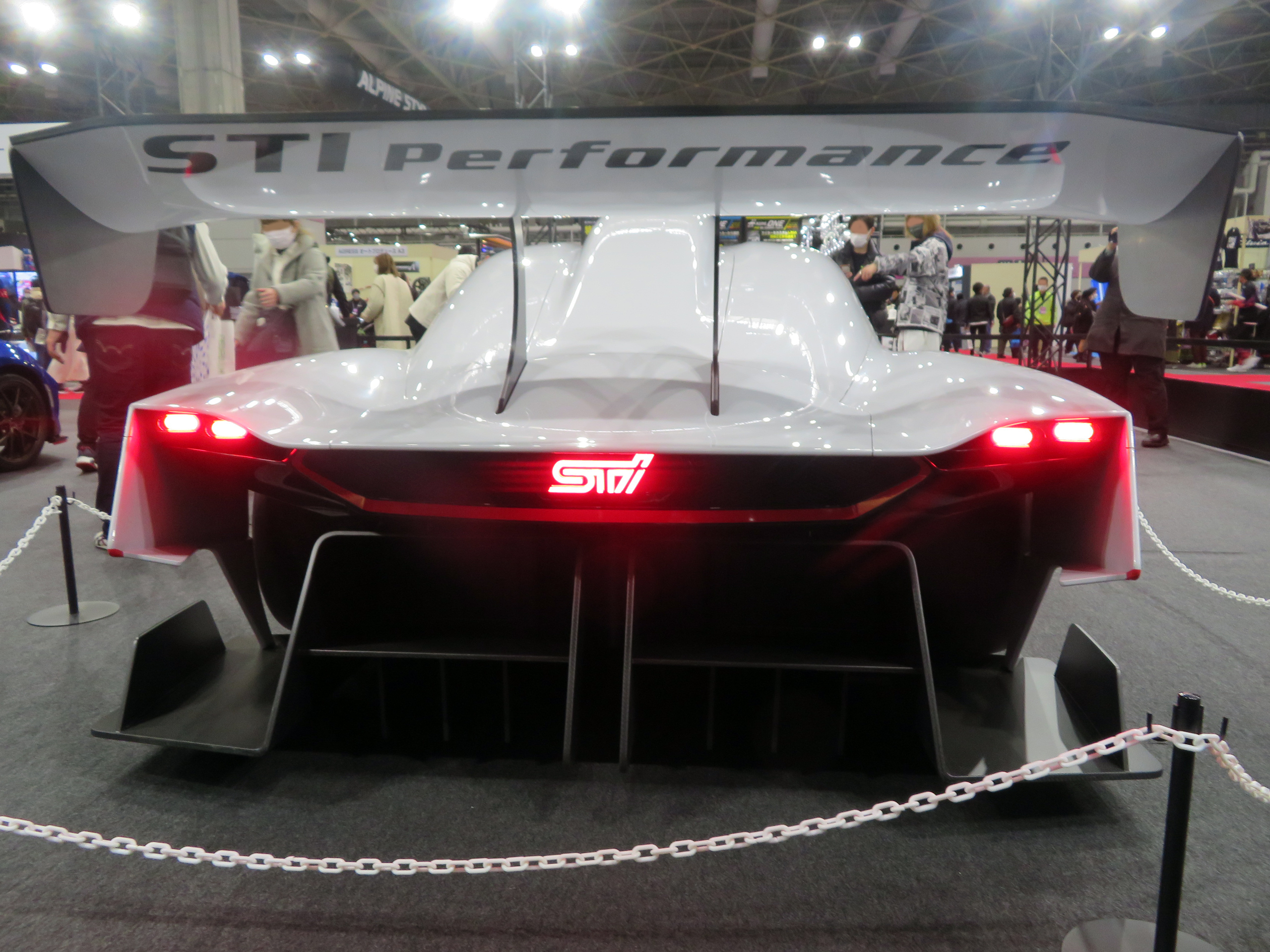
Rear view

Development of the two-seat STI E-RA began in 2020. Early speculation, based on a late-December 2021 teaser photograph showing just the front of the forthcoming concept, was that it could be based on the same platform as the Toyota Sports EV concept unveiled two weeks earlier. The STI E-RA Concept debuted on January 14, 2022, at the Tokyo Auto Salon.

Subaru stated the concept is a prototype of a forthcoming STI E-RA racing car being developed by STI under the project "STI E-RA CHALLENGE". "E-RA" stands for "Electric—Record Attempt", with a stated goal of recording a lap time of 400 seconds at the Nürburgring Nordschleife in 2023. The current Nordschleife lap record for electric vehicles is held by the Volkswagen I.D. R, which recorded a lap record of 365.3 seconds in 2019. Prior to that, the EV record was held by the NIO EP9, which recorded a lap record of 405.9 seconds in 2017. Development will continue throughout 2022 by testing the prototype at tracks in Japan. In addition, the STI E-RA was developed to the requirements of the FIA Electric GT Championship, which is scheduled to hold its inaugural season in 2023.

STI's first project set speed and endurance records using three specially-prepared Subaru Legacy sedans in 1989; its first model sold to consumers was the 1992 "Legacy RS Type RA" to commemorate the "Record Attempt", and since then, STI has used the "RA" designation for its highest-performance models.

The concept was shown in February 2022 at the Osaka Auto Messe, where it proved to be quite popular with children.

=== Drivetrain ===
True to Subaru design heritage, the STI E-RA Concept features all-wheel drive (AWD); for the concept, AWD is implemented using one motor at each wheel, allowing torque vectoring by varying the output at each wheel individually. Total output is stated to be 800 kW (1,073 hp) and 1,100 N⋅m (810 lbf⋅ft). Each motor has an output of 200 kW (268 hp).

The traction motors were developed and supplied by Yamaha Motor Company, which had begun development of high-performance permanent magnet synchronous motors in 2020. Yamaha announced in April 2021 they were accepting orders for a newly developed "Hyper-EV" traction motor, with a maximum output of 350 kW (470 hp) per motor and confirmed the "Hyper-EV" motor was being used in the STI E-RA Concept.

The STI E-RA Concept is equipped with a 60 kWh lithium-ion storage battery. In the FIA Electric GT Championship, cars are required to make a pit stop to charge at least once during the 45-minute race, and Motor Trend speculated the relatively small capacity was designed with this rule in mind. In addition, FIA rules would limit total output to a combined 430 kW (577 hp), and a street-legal homologation variant would need to be produced to qualify, in accordance with Group GT3 rules that would be applied to Electric GT.

=== Chassis ===
The body of the STI E-RA Concept is a carbon fiber monocoque, drawing on experience gained by STI in campaigning the BRZ GT300 in Japan's Super GT racing series. It is equipped with a large roof-mounted scoop for cooling and numerous wings and cutouts to increase downforce.

Brakes are supplied by the AP Racing division of Brembo.

== See also ==
- Porsche Mission R
- Porsche 911
