= Aztec Bowl (stadium) =

Sports venue at San Diego State University (1936–1995)

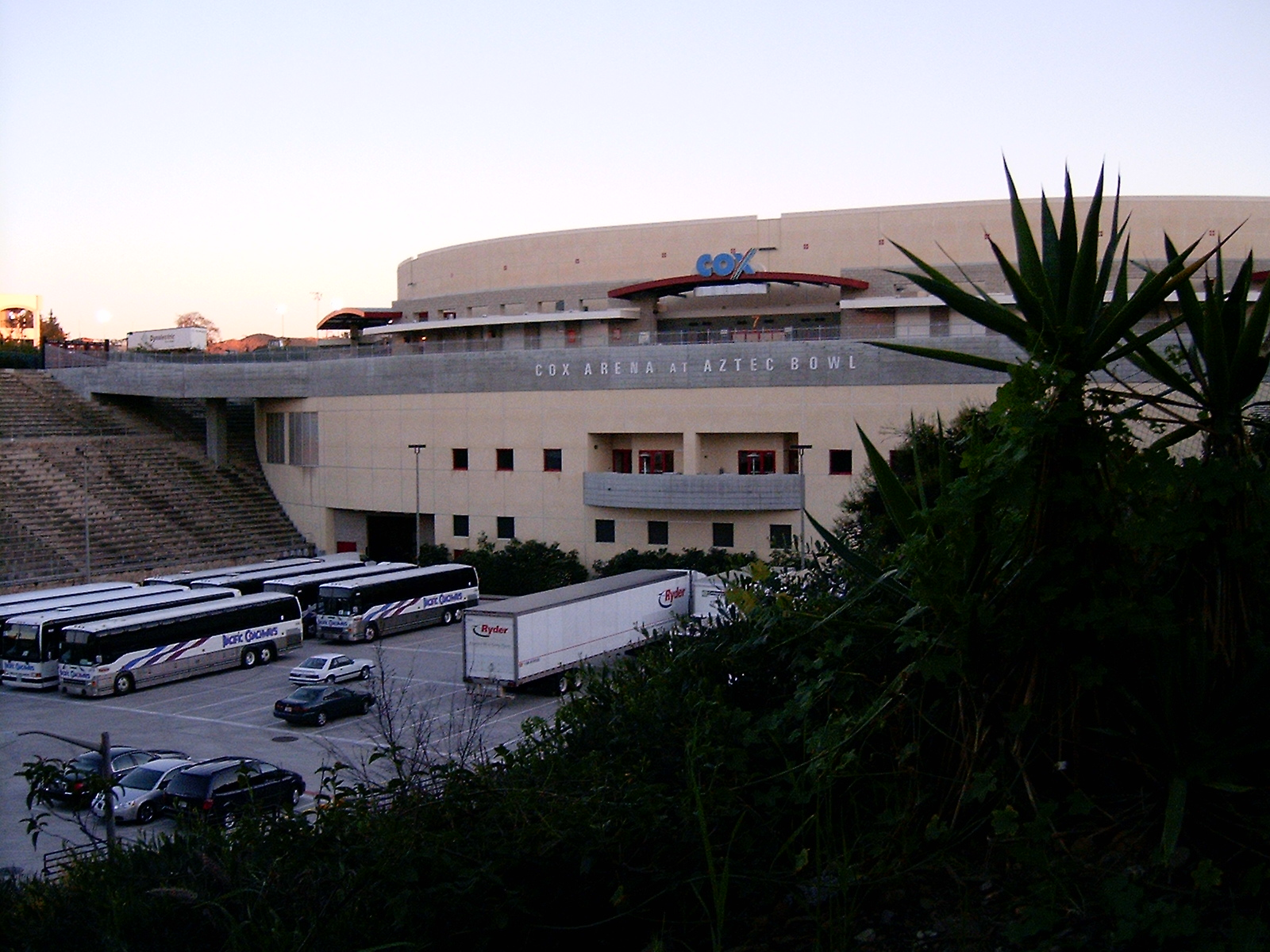
- Viejas Arena, situated in the former Aztec Bowl stadium in 2005
- Interactive map of Aztec Bowl
- Location: 5500 Canyon Crest Dr., San Diego, California
- Owner: San Diego State University
- Operator: San Diego State University
- Capacity: 10,000 (1936–1948); 12,592 (1948–1995)
- Surface: Natural grass

Construction
- Groundbreaking: 1933
- Opened: October 3, 1936; 89 years ago
- Expanded: 1948
- Closed: March 1995
- Cost: $476,863 ($11.2 million in 2025)

Tenants
- Aztec football (NCAA) (1936–1966); Aztec rugby -men (USA Rugby) (1958–1995); Aztec rugby -women (USA Rugby) (1975–1986); Aztec soccer -men (NCAA) ( –1995); Aztec soccer -women (NCAA) ( –1995); San Diego Jaws NASL (1976)
- Aztec Bowl
- U.S. Historic district – Contributing property
- California Historical Landmark No. 798
- Coordinates: 32°46′28″N 117°4′29″W
- Architectural style: Mission/Spanish Revival
- Part of: San Diego State College (ID97000924)
- CHISL No.: 798

Significant dates
- Added to NRHP: May 19, 1994
- Boundary decrease: September 4, 1997
- Designated CHISL: September 16, 1964
- Removed from NRHP: May 30, 2012
- Delisted CP: September 4, 1997

Aztec Bowl was an outdoor stadium in San Diego, California, located on the campus of San Diego State University (SDSU). The stadium was the home of the San Diego State Aztecs football team.

== History ==
Construction of a 10,000 seat stadium began in 1933 following the first of two Works Progress Administration (WPA) grants. 2,592 more seats were added in 1948.

Aztec Bowl hosted the San Diego State Aztecs football team until they moved to San Diego Stadium in 1967. The stadium was used for soccer matches and as a musical venue for the San Diego Symphony, the Grateful Dead in 1969, the Police in 1983 and Lollapalooza in 1994.

John F. Kennedy, then the president of the United States, gave a commencement address and received the first honorary doctorate given by a California State University at the stadium on June 6, 1963. Then-mayor Pete Wilson's 40th birthday party was held there in 1973.

Viejas Arena, the school's basketball arena, has been sitting on the site of the stadium since 1997. The arena was built directly into the canyon hillside, enclosing one end of Aztec Bowl. Two sections of the stadium's original concrete bleachers and cobblestone walls remain visible.

The stadium was listed on the National Register of Historic Places in 1994. A request was made to remove the stadium from the National Register of Historic Places, and was removed on May 30, 2012.
