= Patty Connell =

American rugby union player

- Height: 160 cm (5 ft 3 in)
- Weight: 54 kg (119 lb)

Rugby union career
- Position: Scrum-half
International career
Years	Team	Apps	(Points)
1991–1994	United States	-	(-)

Patty Connell is an American former rugby union player. She played for the United States at the inaugural 1991 Women's Rugby World Cup in Wales. Connell scored a try in the United States 19–6 victory over England in the 1991 Final. She also featured at the 1994 Women's Rugby World Cup.

Connell was inducted into the United States Rugby Hall of Fame along with the 1991 World Cup squad in 2017.
