= FIA Electric GT Championship =

Electric sports car racing series

- Category: Electric grand tourer
- Country: International
- Drivers: 14 (Minimum)
- Teams: 7 (Minimum)
- Manufacturers: 2 (Minimum)

The FIA Electric GT Championship (abbreviated as eGT) is a planned sports car racing series for electric grand tourers sanctioned by the Fédération Internationale de l'Automobile (FIA).

The inaugural season was originally scheduled to begin in 2023. In November 2024, the series had been postponed indefinitely.

== History ==
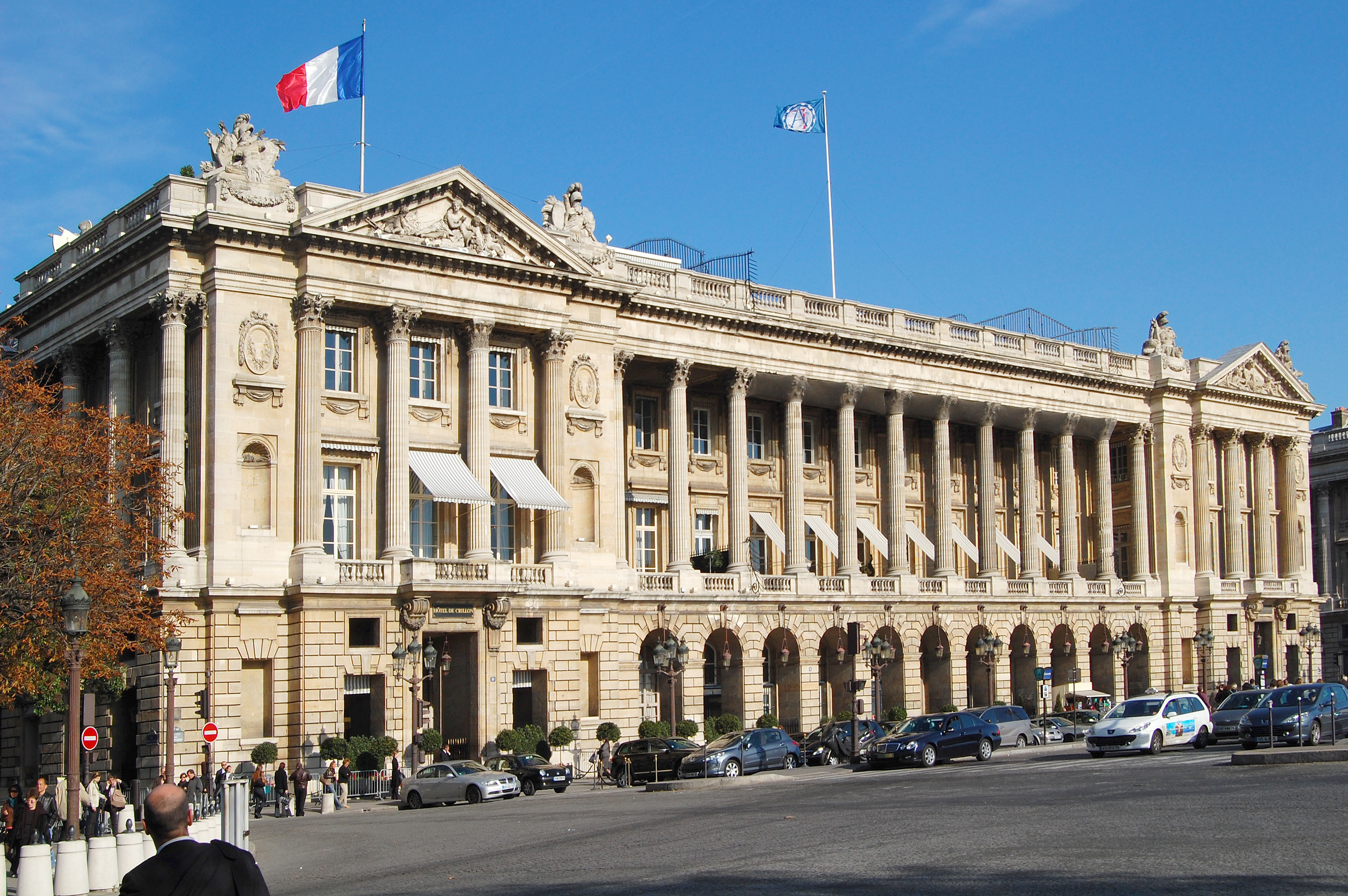
Headquarters of the FIA and its World Motor Sport Council at the Place de la Concorde.

The championship was officially announced to the public on May 6, 2021, following the reveal of the FIA's new Electric GT category for electric-powered grand tourer racing cars. The technical regulations of the new category were unveiled to the World Motor Sport Council by FIA GT Commission President Leena Gade in December 2020. At that point, invitations to tender for the roles of promoter and battery cell supplier to the planned championship had already been announced. Together with the public announcement of the championship, Discovery was presented as the appointed worldwide promoter.

=== Postponement ===
The inaugural season was originally scheduled to begin in 2023. In June 2023, the FIA released a road map as part of their annual environmental report that revealed the championship was postponed until 2026 at the earliest.

In November 2024, the FIA’s deputy to the circuit sport director Stuart Murray said in an interview that work on the proposed series is "something that’s still continuing in the background", but that it hadn't "exactly gone the way [they] wanted it to".

== Format ==
The series will race at full-length permanent circuits. At least six races are planned for the inaugural season, with additional events the following year. Each event will consist of a qualifying sprint race on Saturday followed by a 45-minute main race on Sunday. The main race will feature at least one mandatory fast-charging pit stop.

The FIA has also announced plans to integrate an element of esports into the series.

== Technical regulations ==
The regulations of the new category have been created to match the performance of current GT3 cars, with many technologies being carried over from the GT3 regulations to keep costs low; for instance, minimum weight is planned to be 1,490–1,530 kg (3,280–3,370 lb) to limit the use of expensive materials. Manufacturers will also be permitted to fit an electric powertrain to an existing GT3 model. Having originally been limited by a minimum selling price for the road-going models that the race cars are to be derived from, this limitation was later removed.

The cars will be limited to a power output of 430 kW, though manufacturers may use either two or four electric motors in a rear-wheel-drive or all-wheel-drive configuration. Torque vectoring will also be permitted to aid performance.

Every manufacturer will use lithium-ion battery cells in pouch format supplied by Saft to build their own battery packs with customised layouts. The batteries will have a maximum energy capacity of 87 kWh and recharge at a rate of up to 700 kW, which will replenish 60% of their capacity in "a few minutes", according to the FIA. On race days, a 45-minute charging interval will occur at a standard rate of approximately 350 kW between hour-long practice, qualifying, and competition rounds, with fast charging limited to three or four minute intervals. According to the invitation to tender bids as the sole supplier of cells, FIA provided total battery weight and volume targets to not exceed 350 kg (770 lb) and 175 L (6.2 ft^{3}), respectively. Each battery pack is expected to last a single season without degradation in capacity, during which the vehicles are anticipated to race between 5,000 to 7,500 km (3,100 to 4,700 mi) and experience approximately 200 charging cycles.

== Entries ==
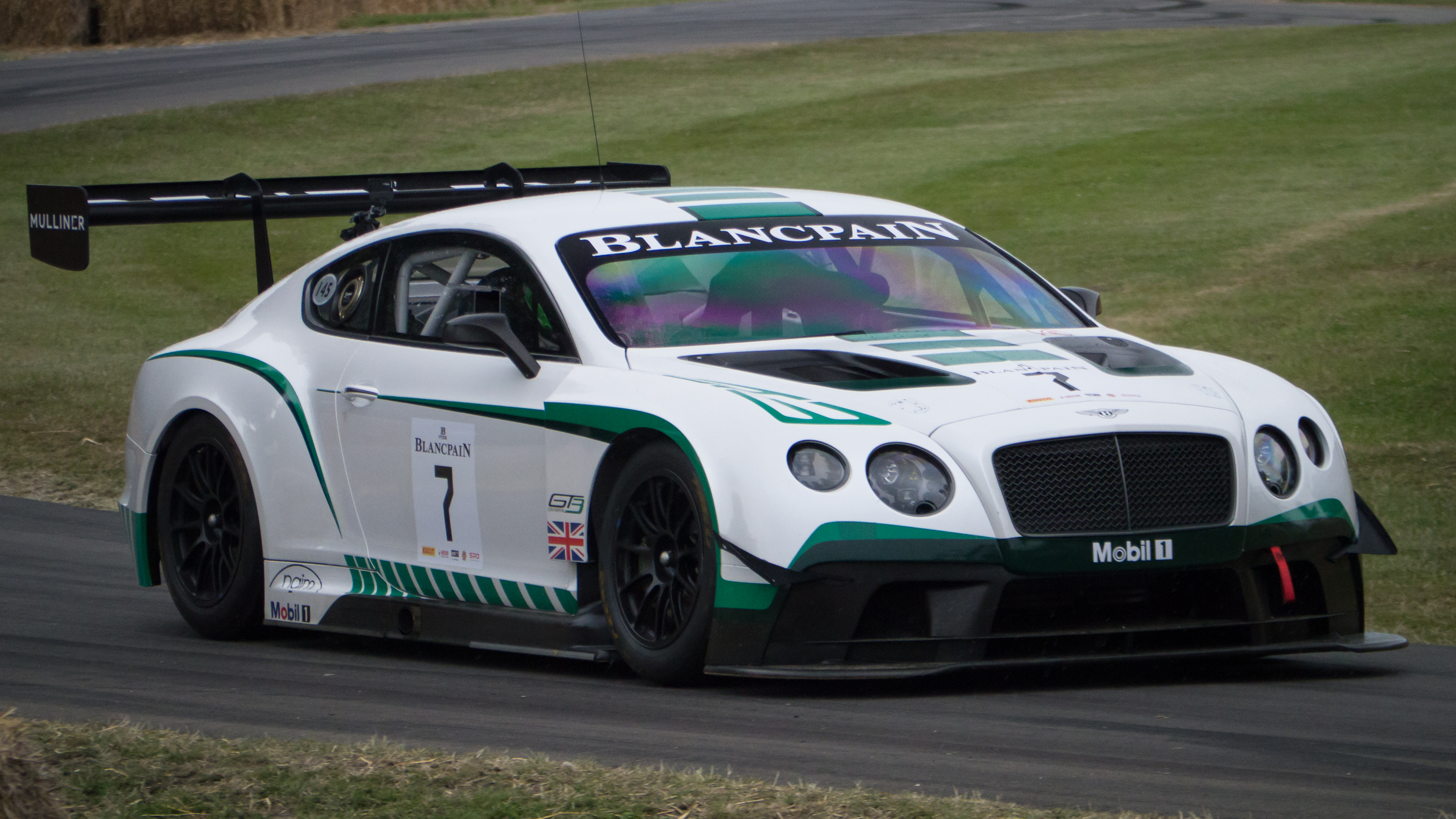
A 2013 Bentley Continental GT3, from which an electric test car based on the FIA's Electric GT technical regulations has been developed.

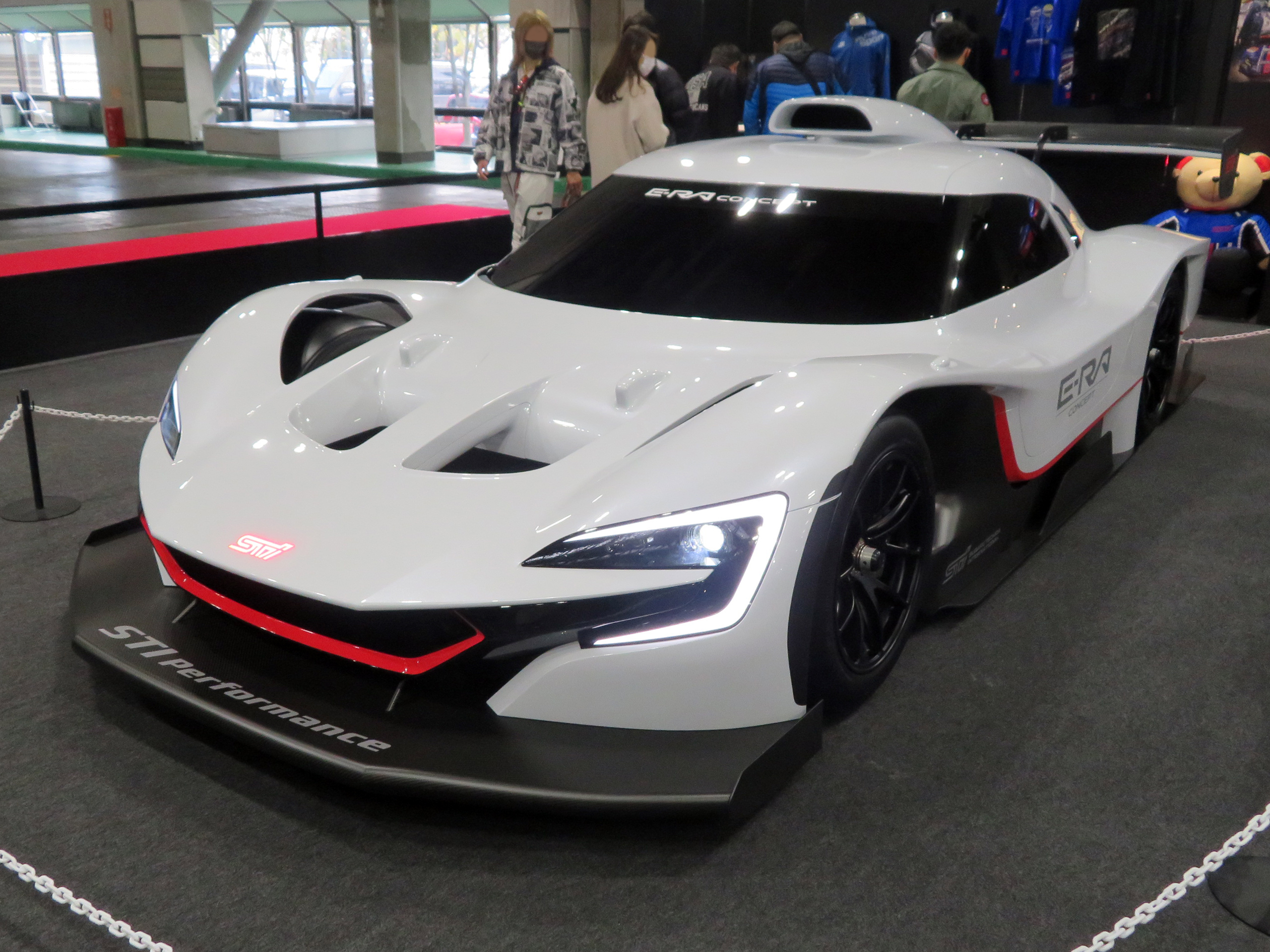
The Subaru STI E-RA concept race car, built to the specifications of the Electric GT regulations.

For the first two seasons of the series, the FIA has aimed at a minimum of fourteen full-season entries divided across seven teams with two cars each. From the third season onwards, this will rise to a minimum of twenty entries divided across ten teams. The championship will also feature a minimum of two manufacturers, rising to a minimum of four for the third season. As of April 2024, no manufacturer or entry has been announced.

=== Reception by manufacturers ===
Markus Flasch of BMW M said in June 2021 that the company is "very interested" in the Electric GT Championship. BMW's Head of Motorsport Mike Krack later stated that he considers the timeline as "very ambitious", but that the company is seriously looking at the new series.

In August 2021, it was revealed that Bentley and RML Group had begun development on an electric test car based on the Bentley Continental GT3 and compatible with the FIA's Electric GT technical regulations. However, Bentley's Director of Motorsport Paul Williams stressed that no decision had been made on whether or not the company would enter the championship, adding that "If there was a fully electric endurance option that is where we would probably be."

General Motors also expressed interest in the new championship in August 2021, with sports car racing program manager Laura Klauser saying she considers the Electric GT Championship "one of the more intriguing" new series the company is evaluating for the future.

In January 2022, Subaru revealed the all-electric STI E-RA concept race car. The car is built to the specifications of the FIA's Electric GT technical regulations, though no announcement on a championship entry was originally made.

Head of Audi Sport customer racing Chris Reinke said in May 2022 that Audi "eventually, for sure" could enter the Electric GT Championship, after previously stating the company is keeping an eye on electric championship developments in the GT segment.

== See also ==
- Electric motorsport
