= Chris Harju =

US international rugby union player

- Born: 20 May 1957 (age 69)
- Height: 1.6 m (5 ft 3 in)
- Weight: 59 kg (130 lb)

Rugby union career
- Position: Fly-half
Senior career
Years	Team	Apps	(Points)
1985	Wiverns	0	(0)
International career
Years	Team	Apps	(Points)
1991	United States	5	

Chris Harju (born 20 May 1957) is a former American rugby union player.

== Biography ==
Harju was a member of the United States squad that won the inaugural 1991 Women's Rugby World Cup in Wales. She made her last appearance for the United States in the Final against England, where she kicked in seven points to help her side win the first World Cup.

Harju had toured Britain with the Wiverns, an unofficial USA team, in 1985. She was a critical care nurse outside of rugby. In 2017, Harju and the 1991 World Cup squad were inducted into the United States Rugby Hall of Fame.
