= International sport =

The concept of international sport refers to sport when the participants represent at least two nations. The most well-known international sports event is the Olympic Games. Other examples include the FIFA World Cup and the Cricket World Cup. The cricket match played between the United States and Canada in 1844 was the first ever international match played in any sport.

Modern international sports events have significant political, economical, and other cultural impacts on countries around the world. Especially with the relationship with politics and sports, sports can influence countries' identities and international relations as a result.

== History ==
The ancient Olympic Games were a series of competitions held between representatives of several city-states and kingdoms from Ancient Greece, which featured mainly athletic but also combat and chariot racing events. During the Olympic games, all struggles between the participating city-states were postponed until the games were finished. The origin of the Olympics is shrouded in mystery and legend. During the 19th century, the Olympic Games became a popular global event.

The first international competition, between teams from Norway and Sweden, was held in Norway in 1932. Apart from a break for the war, the Nordic competitions continued, at first between Finland, Norway and Sweden, with Denmark joining in at a later stage. In 1946 a Nordic body for co-operation (NORD) was founded.

The cricket match played between the United States and Canada was widely recognized as the first ever international match played in any sport. In the modern era, international sporting events have become major global business enterprises and often influence the political, economical, and cultural aspects and relations of countries around the world.

With the first Olympic Games in 776 BCE—which included events such as foot and chariot races, wrestling, jumping, and discus and javelin throwing—the Ancient Greeks introduced formal sports to the world.

== Economics ==
While some economists are skeptical about the economic benefits of hosting the Olympic Games, emphasizing that such "mega-events" often have large costs, hosting (or even bidding for) the Olympics appears to increase the host country's exports, as the host or candidate country sends a signal about trade openness when bidding to host the Games. Moreover, research suggests that hosting the Summer Olympics has a strong positive effect on the philanthropic contributions of corporations headquartered in the host city, which seems to benefit the local nonprofit sector. This positive effect begins in the years leading up to the Games and might persist for several years afterwards, although not permanently. This finding suggests that hosting the Olympics might create opportunities for cities to influence local corporations in ways that benefit the local nonprofit sector and civil society. The Games have also had significant negative effects on host communities; for example, the Centre on Housing Rights and Evictions reports that the Olympics displaced more than two million people over two decades, often disproportionately affecting disadvantaged groups.

Globalization has continually increased international competition in sports. The FIFA World Cup, for example, is the world's most widely viewed sporting event; an estimated 700 million people watched the final match of the 2010 FIFA World Cup held in South Africa.

According to a 2011 A.T. Kearney study of sports teams, leagues and federations, the global sports industry is worth between €350 billion and €450 billion (US$480-$620 billion). This includes infrastructure construction, sporting goods, licensed products and live sports events.

Another possibility was that sports economics is defined by the application of price or decision theory. For example, a study that examines sport using incentives and objective functions or tries to understand, explain, or predict choices in a sport context is sports economics.

== Olympic Games factor of the globalization of sports ==
=== An international retransmission ===
The Olympics are a major factor in the globalization of sport. The Olympic symbol is the most recognized symbol, and the Olympic Games are broadcast around the world. This represents 4.5 billion of people for the 2008 Summer Olympics.

=== Olympic Games globalization ===
The Olympic Games have also undergone globalization. The first Olympic Games of the modern era were held in 1896, only 9 disciplines were present and 241 athletes but only men. The place of women is representative of the position of women in society, and from the first Olympiad 1900 women participated but unofficially. It is in 1920 that the first women were officially part of the Olympic Games.

The number of athletes present at each Olympiad host been increasing significantly since the first Olympiad:

- In 1896 at the first Olympic games 14 countries were represented by 241 athletes for 43 events;
- 1960 Rome Olympic games have grouped 83 countries for a total of 5338 athletes who competed in 150 different events;
- London 2012, 204 countries were present representing 10,568 athletes for a total of 302 events.
