= List of Utah Utes bowl games =

This is a list of Utah Utes bowl games. The Utah Utes football team has played in 28 bowl games in its history, compiling a record of 18–10. *Pineapple Bowl wasn't sanctioned by NCAA so only counted as regular season for statistics.

== Key ==
General
†	Bowl game record attendance
‡	Former bowl game record attendance
*	Denotes national championship game

Results
W	Win
L	Loss
T	Tie

== Bowl games ==
List of bowl games showing bowl played in, date, winning team, score, losing team, stadium, location, attendance, head coach, and MVP
#	Bowl	Date	Winning team	Score	Losing team	Stadium	Location	Attendance	Head coach	MVP
1	Sun Bowl	January 2, 1939	Utah	W 26–0	New Mexico	Kidd Field	El Paso, TX	13,000	Ike Armstrong	
2	Pineapple Bowl*	January 1, 1947	Hawaii	L 16–19	Utah	Honolulu Stadium	Honolulu, HI	22,000	Ike Armstrong	
3	Liberty Bowl	December 19, 1964	Utah	W 32–6	West Virginia	Atlantic City Convention Hall	Atlantic City, NJ	6,059	Ray Nagel	Ernest Allen (Utah)
4	Copper Bowl	December 29, 1992	Washington State	L 28–31	Utah	Arizona Stadium	Tucson, AZ	40,826	Ron McBride	Drew Bledsoe (Washington State); Phillip Bobo (Washington State); Kareem Leary (Utah)
5	Freedom Bowl	December 30, 1993	USC	L 21–28	Utah	Anaheim Stadium	Anaheim, CA	37,203	Ron McBride	Johnnie Morton (USC); Henry Lusk (Utah)
6	Freedom Bowl	December 27, 1994	Utah	W 16–13	Arizona	Anaheim Stadium	Anaheim, CA	27,477	Ron McBride	Tedy Bruschi (Arizona); Cal Beck (Utah)
7	Copper Bowl	December 27, 1996	Wisconsin	L 10–38	Utah	Arizona Stadium	Tucson, AZ	42,122	Ron McBride	Ron Dayne (Wisconsin); Tarek Saleh (Wisconsin)
8	Las Vegas Bowl	December 18, 1999	Utah	W 17–16	Fresno State	Sam Boyd Stadium	Whitney, NV	28,227	Ron McBride	Mike Anderson (Utah)
9	Las Vegas Bowl	December 25, 2001	Utah	W 10–6	USC	Sam Boyd Stadium	Whitney, NV	30,894	Ron McBride	Dameon Hunter (Utah)
10	Liberty Bowl	December 31, 2003	Utah	W 17–0	Southern Miss	Liberty Bowl Memorial Stadium	Memphis, TN	55,989	Urban Meyer	Morgan Scalley (Utah)
11	Fiesta Bowl	January 1, 2005	Utah	W 35–7	Pittsburgh	Sun Devil Stadium	Tempe, AZ	73,519	Urban Meyer; Kyle Whittingham	Alex Smith (Utah); Paris Warren (Utah); Steve Fifita (Utah)
12	Emerald Bowl	December 29, 2005	Utah	W 38–10	Georgia Tech	AT&T Park	San Francisco, CA	25,742	Kyle Whittingham	Travis LaTendresse (Utah); Eric Weddle (Utah)
13	Armed Forces Bowl	December 23, 2006	Utah	W 25–13	Tulsa	Amon G. Carter Stadium	Fort Worth, TX	32,412	Kyle Whittingham	Louie Sakoda (Utah)
14	Poinsettia Bowl	December 20, 2007	Utah	W 35–32	Navy	Qualcomm Stadium	San Diego, CA	39,129	Kyle Whittingham	Brian Johnson (Utah); Joe Dale (Utah)
15	Sugar Bowl	January 2, 2009	Utah	W 31–17	Alabama	Louisiana Superdome	New Orleans, LA	71,872	Kyle Whittingham	Brian Johnson (Utah)
16	Poinsettia Bowl	December 23, 2009	Utah	W 37–27	California	Qualcomm Stadium	San Diego, CA	32,665	Kyle Whittingham	Jordan Wynn (Utah); Stevenson Sylvester (Utah)
17	Maaco Bowl Las Vegas	December 22, 2010	Boise State	L 3–26	Utah	Sam Boyd Stadium	Whitney, NV	41,923	Kyle Whittingham	Kellen Moore (Boise State)
18	Sun Bowl	December 31, 2011	Utah	W 30–27	Georgia Tech	Sun Bowl Stadium	El Paso, TX	48,123	Kyle Whittingham	John White (Utah); Devonte Christopher (Utah); Star Lotulelei (Utah)
19	Las Vegas Bowl	December 20, 2014	Utah	W 45–10	Colorado State	Sam Boyd Stadium	Whitney, NV	33,067	Kyle Whittingham	Travis Wilson (Utah)
20	Las Vegas Bowl	December 19, 2015	Utah	W 35–28	Brigham Young	Sam Boyd Stadium	Whitney, NV	42,213	Kyle Whittingham	Tevin Carter (Utah)
21	Foster Farms Bowl	December 28, 2016	Utah	W 26–24	Indiana	Levi's Stadium	Santa Clara, CA	27,608	Kyle Whittingham	Joe Williams (Utah); Tegray Scales (Indiana)
22	Heart of Dallas Bowl	December 26, 2017	Utah	W 30–14	West Virginia	Cotton Bowl Stadium	Dallas, TX	20,507	Kyle Whittingham	Julian Blackmon (Utah)
23	Holiday Bowl	December 31, 2018	Northwestern	L 20–31	Utah	SDCCU Stadium	San Diego, CA	47,007	Kyle Whittingham	Clayton Thorson (Northwestern); JR Pace (Northwestern)
24	Alamo Bowl	December 31, 2019	Texas	L 10–38	Utah	Alamodome	San Antonio, TX	60,147	Kyle Whittingham	Sam Ehlinger (Texas); Joseph Ossai (Texas)
25	Rose Bowl	January 1, 2022	Ohio State	L 45–48	Utah	Rose Bowl	Pasadena, CA	87,842	Kyle Whittingham	
26	Rose Bowl	January 2, 2023	Penn State	L 21–35	Utah	Rose Bowl	Pasadena, CA	94,873	Kyle Whittingham	
27	Las Vegas Bowl	December 23, 2023	Northwestern	L 7–14	Utah	Allegiant Stadium	Las Vegas, NV	20,897	Kyle Whittingham	
28	Las Vegas Bowl	December 31, 2025	Utah	W 44-22	Nebraska	Allegiant Stadium	Las Vegas, NV	38,879	Morgan Scalley	Devon Dampier (Utah)

- The Pineapple Bowl was not sanctioned by the NCAA and counts as a regular season game in official statistics
