= Western Athletic Conference football =

WAC football champions
- Conference Football Champions
- Western Athletic Conference Logo
- Sport: Football
- Conference: Western Athletic Conference
- Number of teams: 8
- Played: 1962–2012, 2021–2022
- Current champion: Stephen F. Austin Lumberjacks; Abilene Christian Wildcats
- Most championships: BYU Cougars (19)
- Official website: WACSports.com Football

The Western Athletic Conference (WAC) sponsored football and crowned a champion every year from 1962 to 2012. Once considered one of the best conferences in college football, steady attrition from 1999 to 2012 forced the WAC to drop football after fifty-one years.

On January 14, 2021, the WAC announced its intention to reinstate football as a conference-sponsored sport at the NCAA Division I Football Championship Subdivision (FCS) level, as well as the addition of five new members to the conference in all sports, including football. The new members announced include: Abilene Christian University, Lamar University, Sam Houston State University, and Stephen F. Austin State University, all currently of the Southland Conference (SLC), along with Southern Utah University, currently of the Big Sky Conference. Original plans were for all new members to join in July 2022, but after the SLC expelled its departing members, the WAC moved the arrival of those four schools and the relaunch of football to July 2021. Southern Utah's entry remained on the 2022 schedule. The WAC football league also included Dixie State University (renamed Utah Tech University in 2022) and Tarleton State University, both of which played as FCS independents in 2020–21 after having moved from NCAA Division II to the WAC for non-football sports in July 2020. The conference also announced that it will most likely add another football-playing institution at a later date. The conference has been speculated to move back up to the NCAA Division I Football Bowl Subdivision (FBS) in the future following the reestablishment of the football conference at the FCS level.

On the same day, news broke that The University of Texas Rio Grande Valley (UTRGV), a non-football playing member of the conference, had committed to create an FCS football program by 2024. At the time, the program would most likely have competed as part of the newly-reinstated WAC football conference.

For its first two planned seasons in 2021 and 2022, the relaunched WAC football league was branded as the ASUN–WAC (or WAC–ASUN) Challenge, with the WAC establishing a temporary football partnership with the ASUN Conference. The ASUN eventually started its own FCS football league in 2022. Under the partnership, three FCS programs that joined the ASUN in July 2021 played alongside current WAC members.

The ASUN–WAC partnership was renewed for the 2022 season after the start of FBS transitions by ASUN member Jacksonville State and WAC member Sam Houston rendered both ineligible for the FCS playoffs, also dropping both conferences below the 6 football members needed to qualify for an automatic berth in the FCS playoffs. The WAC's playoff-eligible membership soon dropped further to 3, after Incarnate Word backed out of its planned move from the SLC to the WAC and Lamar, which had announced it would leave the WAC in 2023 to return to the SLC, accelerated this move to 2022.

The 2022 season proved to be the last for the WAC as a standalone football conference. On December 20, 2022, the ASUN and WAC jointly announced that they would fully merge their football conferences effective with the 2023 season, with its name later announced as the United Athletic Conference. The ASUN is contributing Austin Peay, Central Arkansas, Eastern Kentucky, and North Alabama to the new league, with the WAC contributing Abilene Christian, Southern Utah, Stephen F. Austin, Tarleton, and Utah Tech. UTRGV, which put off the start of its football program to 2025, will join at that time. The UAC played a six-game schedule in 2023 before adopting a full round-robin in 2024.

== Former members ==
The WAC has 29 former football-playing members.

Team	First Year	Last Year	WAC Titles	Current Primary Conference
Air Force Falcons	1980	1998	3	Mountain West
Arizona Wildcats	1962	1977	2	Big 12
Arizona State Sun Devils	1962	1977	7	Big 12
Boise State Broncos	2001	2010	8	Mountain West; Pac-12 (2026)
BYU Cougars	1962	1998	19	Big 12
Fresno State Bulldogs	1992	2011	3	Mountain West; Pac-12 (2026)
Colorado State Rams	1967	1998	3	Mountain West; Pac-12 (2026)
Hawaii Warriors	1979	2011	4	Mountain West
Idaho Vandals	2005	2012	0	Big Sky
Lamar Cardinals	2021	2021	0	Southland
Louisiana Tech Bulldogs	2001	2012	2	C-USA
UNLV Rebels	1996	1998	0	Mountain West
Nevada Wolf Pack	2000	2011	2	Mountain West
New Mexico Lobos	1962	1998	2	Mountain West
New Mexico State Aggies	2005	2012	0	C-USA
Rice Owls	1996	2004	0	The American
San Diego State Aztecs	1978	1998	1	Mountain West; Pac-12 (2026)
San Jose State Spartans	1996	2012	0	Mountain West
SMU Mustangs	1996	2004	0	ACC
TCU Horned Frogs	1996	2000	2	Big 12
UTEP Miners	1967	2004	1	C-USA; Mountain West(2026)
UTSA Roadrunners	2012	2012	0	The American
Texas State Bobcats	2012	2012	0	Sun Belt
Tulsa Golden Hurricane	1996	2004	0	The American
Utah Utes	1962	1998	2	Big 12
Utah State Aggies	2005	2012	1	Mountain West; Pac-12 (2026)
Wyoming Cowboys	1962	1998	7	Mountain West
Sam Houston State	2021	2022	1	C-USA
Stephen F. Austin	2021	2023	1	Southland

== Current members ==
The WAC resumed play in the 2021 fall season with 9 members. Before the reinstatement of football was officially announced, media reports indicated that the WAC might add two more schools to join the conference for football. On the same day that WAC confirmed the return of football, full conference member UTRGV announced that it would start an FCS football program no later than 2024. By the end of January 2021, three more schools were brought into WAC football for the 2021 fall season only. All are incoming members of the ASUN Conference, which plans to start an FCS football league in 2022. The WAC–ASUN Challenge consists of the seven teams that are eligible for the FCS playoffs. Utah Tech and Tarleton are included in alliance scheduling, but because of their ongoing transitions from NCAA Division II to Division I are ineligible for the playoffs until the 2024 season. Games against these schools do not count in alliance standings, although games against full WAC members count in the separate WAC league table. Jacksonville State and Sam Houston State left the WAC for the 2023 season as they began transitioning to the FBS level as members of Conference USA. In 2023, the ASUN–WAC Challenge became the United Athletic Conference and became a full FCS conference. Stephen F. Austin and UT Rio Grande Valley left the WAC for the Southland Conference before the 2024 season, prior to UTRGV having their first ever season of college football.

Team	Location	Nickname	Stadium	Capacity	Current Primary Conference	Starting Year
Abilene Christian	Abilene, TX	Wildcats	Anthony Field at Wildcat Stadium	12,000	WAC	2021
Central Arkansas	Conway, AR	Bears	Estes Stadium	12,000	ASUN	2021
Eastern Kentucky	Richmond, KY	Colonels	Roy Kidd Stadium	20,000	ASUN	2021
Southern Utah	Cedar City, UT	Thunderbirds	Eccles Coliseum	8,500	WAC	2022
Tarleton State	Stephenville, TX	Texans	Memorial Stadium	17,000	WAC	2021
Utah Tech	St. George, UT	Trailblazers	Greater Zion Stadium	10,000	WAC	2021

== Conference championships ==
=== By year ===
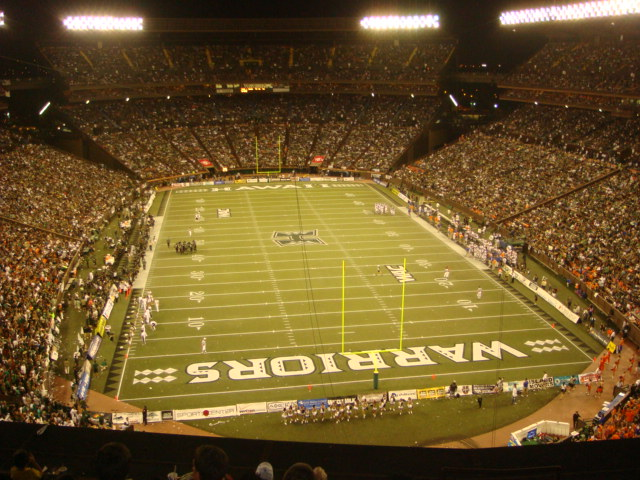
A 2007 WAC game, Boise State at Hawaii

Season	Champion	Conference record
1962	New Mexico	2–1–1
1963	Arizona State	3–0
1964	Arizona	3–1
1964	New Mexico	3–1
1964	Utah	3–1
1965	BYU	4–1
1966	Wyoming	5–0
1967	Wyoming	5–0
1968	Wyoming	6–1
1969	Arizona State	6–1
1970	Arizona State	7–0
1971	Arizona State	7–0
1972	Arizona State	5–1
1973	Arizona	6–1
1973	Arizona State	6–1
1974	BYU	6–0–1
1975	Arizona State	7–0
1976	BYU	6–1
1976	Wyoming	6–1
1977	Arizona State	6–1
1977	BYU	6–1
1978	BYU	5–1
1979	BYU	7–0
1980	BYU	6–1
1981	BYU	7–1
1982	BYU	7–1
1983	BYU	7–0
1984	BYU	8–0
1985	Air Force	7–1
1985	BYU	7–1
1986	San Diego State	7–1
1987	Wyoming	8–0
1988	Wyoming	8–0
1989	BYU	7–1
1990	BYU	7–1
1991	BYU	7–0–1
1992	BYU	6–2
1992	Fresno State	6–2
1992	Hawaii	6–2
1993	BYU	6–2
1993	Fresno State	6–2
1993	Wyoming	6–2
1994	Colorado State	7–1
1995	Air Force	6–2
1995	BYU	6–2
1995	Colorado State	6–2
1995	Utah	6–2
1996	BYU	8–0
1997	Colorado State	7–1
1998	Air Force	7–1
1999	Hawaii	5–2
1999	Fresno State	5–2
1999	TCU	5–2
2000	TCU	7–1
2000	UTEP	7–1
2001	Louisiana Tech	7–1
2002	Boise State	8–0
2003	Boise State	8–0
2004	Boise State	8–0
2005	Boise State	7–1
2005	Nevada	7–1
2006	Boise State	8–0
2007	Hawaii	8–0
2008	Boise State	8–0
2009	Boise State	8–0
2010	Boise State	7–1
2010	Nevada	7–1
2010	Hawaii	7–1
2011	Louisiana Tech	6–1
2012	Utah State	6–0
2013–2020	Dropped football	
2021	Sam Houston State	5–0
2022	Stephen F. Austin	3–1

=== By team ===
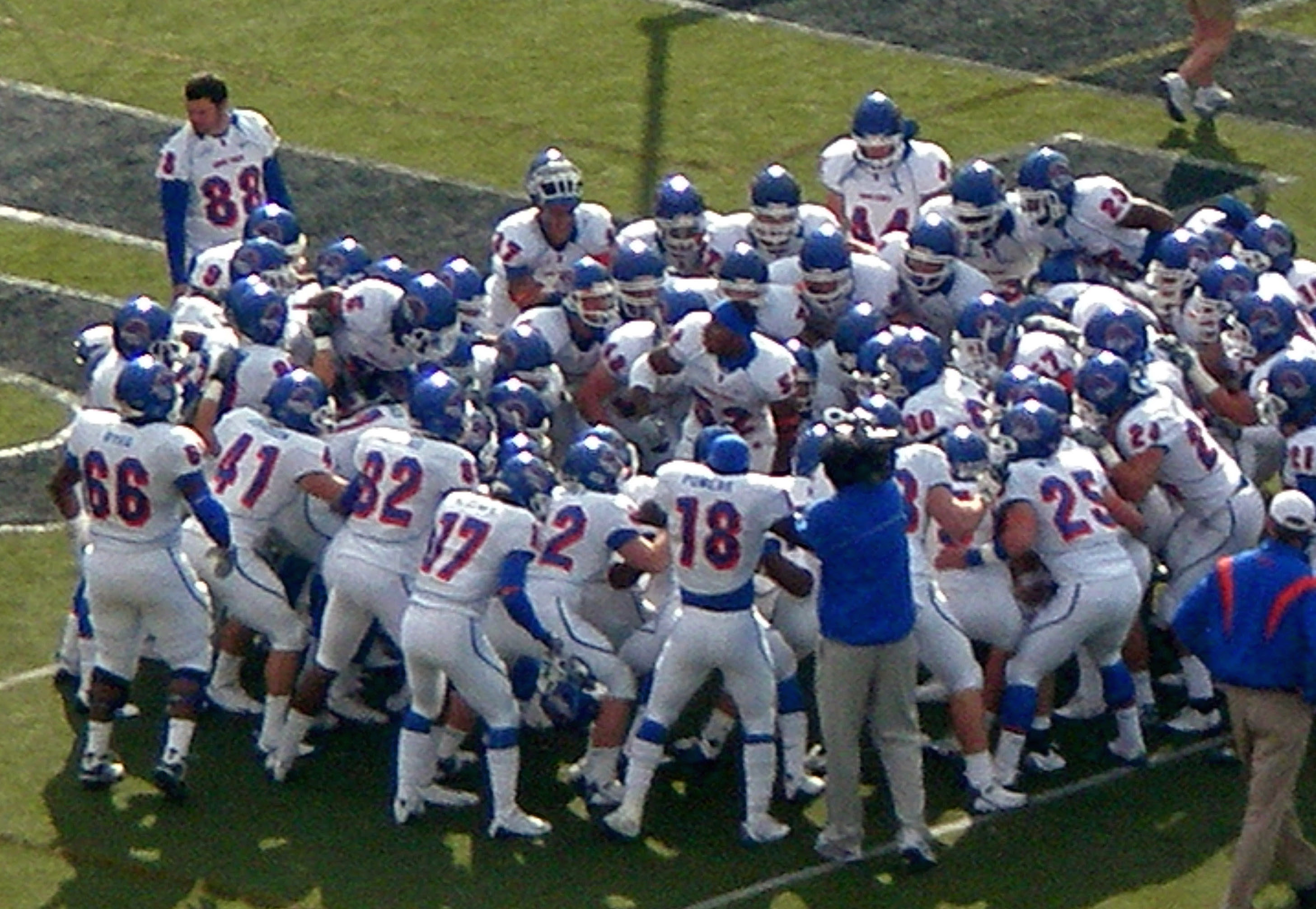
Members of the 2008 WAC champion Boise State team, before a game against Nevada

Team	Championships		
Team	Total	Outright	Shared
BYU	19	13	6
Boise State	8	6	2
Arizona State	7	5	2
Wyoming	7	5	2
Hawaii	4	1	3
Colorado State	3	2	1
Air Force	3	1	2
Fresno State	3	0	3
Louisiana Tech	2	2	0
New Mexico	2	2	0
Arizona	2	0	2
Nevada	2	0	2
TCU	2	0	2
Utah	2	0	2
Sam Houston State	1	1	0
San Diego State	1	1	0
UTEP	1	0	1
Utah State	1	1	0
Abilene Christian	1	0	1
Stephen F. Austin	1	0	1

== Bowl games ==
The first bowl game appearance by a WAC team was at the 1964 Liberty Bowl, where Utah defeated West Virginia of the Southern Conference, 32–6.

The WAC had conference tie-ins with various bowl games during its history, including:

- Famous Idaho Potato Bowl (2000–2012)
- Hawaii Bowl (2002–2011)
- Holiday Bowl (1978–1997)

=== Bowl Championship Series ===
The WAC champion received an automatic berth in one of the five Bowl Championship Series (BCS) bowl games if they were the highest ranked non-automatic qualifying conference champion and either of the following:

- Ranked in the top 12 of the BCS Rankings.
- Ranked in the top 16 of the BCS Rankings and its ranking was higher than that of an automatic qualifying conference champion.

By qualifying under the first criterion above, Boise State landed a berth in the 2007 Fiesta Bowl, and Hawaii received a bid to play in the 2008 Sugar Bowl. In 2009, the Mountain West champion TCU Horned Frogs received the automatic BCS bid by finishing higher than Boise State in the final BCS rankings. However, Boise State received a BCS at-large bid and defeated TCU in the 2010 Fiesta Bowl. In three BCS bowl games, the WAC recorded two wins and one loss. In addition to those three teams that played in BCS bowls, four other WAC teams qualified for a BCS berth but were not selected to play in a BCS bowl game: TCU in 2000 and Boise State in 2004, 2008, and 2010.

Bowl	WAC		Opponent		
Bowl	Team	Score	Team	Score	Conference
2007 Fiesta Bowl	#9 Boise State	43	#7 Oklahoma	42	Big 12
2008 Sugar Bowl	#10 Hawaii	10	#4 Georgia	41	SEC
2010 Fiesta Bowl	#6 Boise State	17	#3 TCU	10	Mountain West

== Rivalries ==
Notable football rivalries involving WAC teams are listed below. Records are not limited to years that the WAC was active.

Teams		Rivalry	Years	Games	Series leader (W–L–T)	Current win streak	Ref.
Idaho	Boise State	Governor's Trophy	1971–2010	40	Boise State (22–17–1)	Boise State (12)	
New Mexico State	New Mexico	Rio Grande Rivalry	1894–2018	109	New Mexico (71–33–5)	New Mexico (1)	
New Mexico State	UTEP	The Battle of I-10	1914–2018	96	UTEP (57–37–2)	New Mexico State (2)	
San Jose State	Fresno State	Valley Rivalry	1921–2018	82	Fresno State (42–37–3)	Fresno State (2)	
Sam Houston State	Stephen F. Austin	Battle of the Piney Woods	1923–Present	95	Sam Houston State (58–35–2)	Sam Houston State (10)	
Utah State	BYU	Old Wagon Wheel	1922–2018	88	BYU (48–37–3)	Utah State (2)	
Utah State	Utah	Battle of the Brothers	1892–2015	113	Utah (79–30–4)	Utah (2)	

== Divisional alignment ==
Starting in 1996, the 16 conference members were divided info four pods, each with four teams. Two pods comprised the Pacific Division, and the other two pods were the Mountain Division. Pod one would always compete in Pacific, while pod four would always compete in Mountain. The other two pods were scheduled to swap divisions every two years, with the new alignment to take effect in even-numbered years. The pods and divisional alignment were discontinued after 1998.

WAC member locations during the four-pod system (1996–1998)

Pod	Teams	Division		
Pod	Teams	1996	1997	1998
1	Fresno State; Hawaii; San Diego State; San Jose State	Pacific	Pacific	Pacific
2	Air Force; Colorado State; UNLV; Wyoming	Pacific	Pacific	Mountain
3	BYU; New Mexico; Utah; UTEP	Mountain	Mountain	Pacific
4	Rice; SMU; TCU; Tulsa	Mountain	Mountain	Mountain
