= 1964 Arizona State Sun Devils football team =

American college football season

1964 Arizona State Sun Devils football
- Conference: Western Athletic Conference
- Record: 8–2 (0–2 WAC)
- Head coach: Frank Kush (7th season)
- Captains: Jerry Smith; Ron Scarfo
- Home stadium: Sun Devil Stadium

1964 Western Athletic Conference football standings
	Conf.					Overall
Team	W		L		T	W		L		T
New Mexico +	3	–	1	–	0	9	–	2	–	0
Utah +	3	–	1	–	0	9	–	2	–	0
Arizona +	3	–	1	–	0	6	–	3	–	1
Wyoming	2	–	2	–	0	6	–	2	–	2
Arizona State	0	–	2	–	0	8	–	2	–	0
BYU	0	–	4	–	0	3	–	6	–	1
+ – Conference co-champions

The 1964 Arizona State Sun Devils football team was an American football team that represented Arizona State University in the Western Athletic Conference (WAC) during the 1964 NCAA University Division football season. In their seventh season under head coach Frank Kush, the Sun Devils compiled an 8–2 record (0–2 against WAC opponents), and outscored their opponents by a combined total of 230 to 125.

The team's statistical leaders included John Torok with 2,356 passing yards, Gene Foster with 311 rushing yards, and Ben Hawkins with 719 receiving yards.

Gene Felker, Bill Kajikawa, Paul Kemp, Jack Stovall, and Dick Tamburo were assistant coaches. The team captains were Jerry Smith and Ron Scarfo. The Sun Devils finished 7–0 at home and 1–2 on the road. Home games were played at Sun Devil Stadium in Tempe, Arizona.

== Schedule ==
Date	Opponent	Site	Result	Attendance	Source
September 19	Utah State*	Sun Devil Stadium; Tempe, AZ	W 24–8	33,217	
September 26	at West Texas State*	Buffalo Bowl; Canyon, TX	W 34–8	11,027	
October 3	Wichita State*	Sun Devil Stadium; Tempe, AZ	W 24–18	34,984	
October 10	Texas Western*	Sun Devil Stadium; Tempe, AZ	W 42–13	29,127	
October 24	at Utah	Ute Stadium; Salt Lake City, UT	L 3–16	25,409	
October 31	Colorado State*	Sun Devil Stadium; Tempe, AZ	W 34–6	26,753	
November 7	Kansas State*^{†}	Sun Devil Stadium; Tempe, AZ	W 21–10	32,026	
November 14	San Jose State*	Sun Devil Stadium; Tempe, AZ	W 28–16	21,477	
November 21	Idaho*	Sun Devil Stadium; Tempe, AZ	W 14–0	22,613	
November 28	at Arizona	Arizona Stadium; Tucson, AZ (rivalry)	L 6–30	29,000	
*Non-conference game; ^{†}Homecoming

== Game summaries ==
During the season opener at Sun Devil Stadium, Arizona State defeated Utah State 24–8 on September 19.

On September 26, the Sun Devils recorded a 34–8 road win over West Texas State.

Arizona State outlasted Wichita State for a 24–18 home victory on October 3.

On October 10, the Sun Devils beat Texas-El Paso 42–13 in Tempe.

Following a bye week, Arizona State suffered a 16–3 road loss against Utah on October 24.

On October 31, the Sun Devils rebounded with a 34–6 home win over Colorado State.

Arizona State prevailed for a 21–10 home victory against Kansas State on November 7.

On November 14, the Sun Devils defeated San Jose State 28–16 at Sun Devil Stadium.

In the home finale, Arizona State recorded a 14–0 shutout win over Idaho on November 21.

In the rivalry matchup in Tucson, the Sun Devils closed their season with a 30–6 road loss to Arizona on November 28. Arizona State quarterback John Torok set a single-game school record with six interceptions in defeat. The Sun Devils set single-game school records with -23 net rushing yards and -1.21 yards per rush in the loss. Wingback Larry Todd collected 194 receiving yards for Arizona State.

== Roster ==
Arizona State's usual offensive lineup included wide receiver Ben Hawkins, left tackle Ray Shirey, left guard John Folmer, center Jim Murphy, right guard Bobby Johnson, right tackle Frank Mitacek, tight end Jerry Smith, quarterback John Torok, halfback Gene Foster, fullback Jesse Fleming, and wingback Larry Todd. Jim Bramlet, Dewey Forrister, John Goodman, Darrell Hoover, Chuck Kolb, Bob Lueck, Paul Palumbo, Ron Scarfo, and John Scavo were also on the roster.

== Individual and team statistics ==
Arizona State's individual statistical leaders included:

- Rushing: Gene Foster, 82 carries, 311 net yards, and 3.8 yards per carry;
- Passing: John Torok, 139 of 251 passing, 2,356 passing yards, 55.4% completion percentage, 20 passing touchdowns, and 14 interceptions;
- Scoring: Ben Hawkins, 44 points on seven touchdowns and a two-point conversion;
- Receiving: (tie) Ben Hawkins, 42 receptions for 718 yards and five touchdowns, Jerry Smith, 42 receptions for 618 yards and five touchdowns;
- Interceptions: Ben Hawkins, three interceptions for 52 return yards;
- Punting: Chuck Kolb, 35 punts for 1,340 yards and a 38.8 yard average;
- Kickoff returns: Larry Todd, 12 returns for 219 yards; and
- Punt returns: (tie) Ben Hawkins, six returns for 151 yards and Larry Todd, 10 returns for 84 yards.

The Sun Devils tied a single-season school record for the fewest rushing touchdowns (six).

Arizona State team statistics included the following:

- Rushing: 120.3 yards per game on offense, 120.5 yards allowed per game on defense;
- Passing: 255.9 yards per game on offense, 107.6 yards allowed per game on defense;
- Total offense: 376.2 yards per game on offense, 228.1 yards allowed per game on defense;
- Scoring: 23.0 points per game on offense, 12.5 points allowed per game on defense;
- First downs: 188 first downs on offense, 118 first downs allowed on defense; and
- Punts: 35 total punts for an average of 38.3 yards per punt.

== Awards and honors ==
No Arizona State players received first-team honors on the 1964 All-Western Athletic Conference team, though three received second-team honors: tight end Jerry Smith, wingback Larry Todd, and quarterback John Torok.

Team awards were presented as follows:

- Quarterback John Torok won the Sun Angel Award;
- Tight end Jerry Smith won the Mike Bartholomew Award;
- Rick Davis won the Cecil Abono Captains Award; and
- Center Jim Murphy won the Glen Hawkins Sportsmanship Award.

Arizona State players participated in the following post-season all-star games:

- Halfback Gene Foster played in the 1964 North-South Shrine Game;
- Tight end Jerry Smith played in the 1965 Coaches All-America Game; and
- Wide receiver Ben Hawkins played in the 1965 East–West Shrine Game.
