= 1965 Gator Bowl (January) =

American college football game

- 20th Gator Bowl
Florida State Seminoles	Oklahoma Sooners
(8-1–1)	(6-3–1)
Independent	Big Eight
36	19
Head coach: Bill Peterson	Head coach: Gomer Jones
	1	2	3	4	Total
Florida State	6	18	6	6	36
Oklahoma	7	0	6	6	19
- Date: January 2, 1965
- Season: 1964
- Stadium: Gator Bowl Stadium
- Location: Jacksonville, Florida
- MVP: SE Fred Biletnikoff (Florida State); QB Steve Tensi (Florida State); LB Carl McAdams (Oklahoma)
- Referee: R.P. Williams (SEC; split crew: SEC, SWC)

United States TV coverage
- Network: ABC
- Announcers: Curt Gowdy, Paul Christman

The 1965 Gator Bowl (January) was an American college football bowl game played on January 2, 1965, at Gator Bowl Stadium in Jacksonville, Florida. The game pitted the Florida State Seminoles and the Oklahoma Sooners.

== Background ==
Florida State started the season with five straight wins (including one against #5 Kentucky) to get to #10 in the rankings before a loss to Virginia Tech dropped them out. They went 3-0-1 the rest of the way, while being invited to a bowl game for the first time since 1958.

Oklahoma started the season ranked at #2, but went 1-3 to start the season, with losses to USC, #1 Texas, and Kansas. They went 5-0-1 the rest of the season (including a win at #4 Nebraska), to finish in second place in the Big Eight Conference to qualify for their sixth bowl game in 11 years.

== Game summary ==
- Florida State - Howard Ehler, 69-yd. pass interception (kick failed)
- Oklahoma - Jon Kennedy, 1-yd. run (Butch Metcalf kick)
- Florida State - Fred Biletnikoff, 15-yd. pass from Steve Tensi (pass failed)
- Florida State - Biletnikoff, 14-yd. pass from Tensi (pass failed)
- Florida State - Biletnikoff, 10-yd. pass from Tensi (pass failed)
- Oklahoma - Tommy Pannell, 2-yd. run (pass failed)
- Florida State - Don Floyd, 14-yd. pass from Tensi (pass failed)
- Oklahoma - Ben Hart, 95-yd. pass from Ronnie Fletcher (pass failed)
- Florida State - Biletnikoff, 6-yd. pass from Tensi (kick failed)

For Florida State, Steve Tensi threw 23-of-36 for 303 yards and five touchdowns. Fred Biletnikoff caught four of those passes for touchdowns, along with nine more for a total of 192 yards. Florida State outrushed Oklahoma 217 to 71, outthrew them 303 to 209 while only punting once in the game.

== Aftermath ==
Florida State would reach three more bowl games in the decade; Oklahoma would reach two more in the decade.
