= 1964 Oklahoma Sooners football team =

American college football season

1964 Oklahoma Sooners football

Gator Bowl, L 19–36 vs. Florida State
- Conference: Big Eight Conference
- Record: 6–4–1 (5–1–1 Big 8)
- Head coach: Gomer Jones (1st season)
- Captains: Newt Burton; John Garrett
- Home stadium: Oklahoma Memorial Stadium

1964 Big Eight Conference football standings
	Conf.					Overall
Team	W		L		T	W		L		T
No. 6 Nebraska $	6	–	1	–	0	9	–	2	–	0
Oklahoma	5	–	1	–	1	6	–	4	–	1
Kansas	5	–	2	–	0	6	–	4	–	0
Missouri	4	–	2	–	1	6	–	3	–	1
Oklahoma State	3	–	4	–	0	4	–	6	–	0
Kansas State	3	–	4	–	0	3	–	7	–	0
Colorado	1	–	6	–	0	2	–	8	–	0
Iowa State	0	–	7	–	0	1	–	8	–	1
$ – Conference champion; Rankings from AP Poll

The 1964 Oklahoma Sooners football team represented the University of Oklahoma as a member of the Big Eight Conference during the 1964 NCAA University Division football season.They Led by were first-year head coach Gomer Jones the Sooner compiled an overall record of 6–4–1 with a mark of 5–1–1 in conference play, placing second in the Big Eight. Oklahoma was invited to the Gator Bowl, where the Sooner lost to Florida State. The team played home games at Oklahoma Memorial Stadium in Norman, Oklahoma.

In the second game of the season, on September 26, the Sooners where upset by at home by the USC, 40–14.

== Schedule ==
Date	Opponent	Rank	Site	TV	Result	Attendance	Source
September 19	at Maryland*	No. 2	Byrd Stadium; College Park, MD		W 13–3	35,200	
September 26	USC*	No. 2	Oklahoma Memorial Stadium; Norman, OK		L 14–40	61,700	
October 10	vs. No. 1 Texas*		Cotton Bowl; Dallas, TX (Red River Shootout)	NBC	L 7–28	75,504	
October 17	at Kansas		Memorial Stadium; Lawrence, KS		L 14–15	44,000	
October 24	Kansas State		Oklahoma Memorial Stadium; Norman, OK		W 44–0	46,600	
October 31	at Colorado		Folsom Field; Boulder, CO		W 14–11	24,200	
November 7	at Iowa State		Oklahoma Memorial Stadium; Norman, OK		W 30–0	42,000	
November 14	Missouri		Oklahoma Memorial Stadium; Norman, OK (rivalry)		T 14–14	52,000	
November 21	No. 4 Nebraska		Oklahoma Memorial Stadium; Norman, OK (rivalry)		W 17–7	55,000	
November 28	at Oklahoma State		Lewis Field; Stillwater, OK (Bedlam Series)		W 21–16	37,000	
January 2, 1965	vs. Florida State*		Gator Bowl Stadium; Jacksonville, FL (Gator Bowl)	ABC	L 19–36	50,408	
*Non-conference game; Rankings from AP Poll released prior to the game; Source:

== Rankings ==
Ranking movements Legend: ██ Increase in ranking ██ Decrease in ranking — = Not ranked ( ) = First-place votes
	Week										
Poll	Pre	1	2	3	4	5	6	7	8	9	Final
AP	2 (15)	—	—	—	—	—	—	—	—	—	—

== NFL draft ==
The following players were drafted into the National Football League on November 28, 1964. Players were offered contracts but were declared ineligible to play in the Gator Bowl if they signed them before the game, as was the case with Ralph Neely.

Round	Pick	Player	Position	NFL team
2	23	Lance Rentzel	Wide receiver	Minnesota Vikings
2	28	Ralph Neely	Tackle	Baltimore Colts
5	67	John Flynn	End	Detroit Lions
6	79	Jim Grisham	Back	Minnesota Vikings
14	193	Larry Brown	Back	Detroit Lions
18	250	Ed McQuarters	Guard	St. Louis Cardinals
