= 1964 Kansas Jayhawks football team =

American college football season

1964 Kansas Jayhawks football
- Conference: Big Eight Conference
- Record: 6–4 (5–2 Big 8)
- Head coach: Jack Mitchell (7th season)
- Home stadium: Memorial Stadium

1964 Big Eight Conference football standings
	Conf.					Overall
Team	W		L		T	W		L		T
No. 6 Nebraska $	6	–	1	–	0	9	–	2	–	0
Oklahoma	5	–	1	–	1	6	–	4	–	1
Kansas	5	–	2	–	0	6	–	4	–	0
Missouri	4	–	2	–	1	6	–	3	–	1
Oklahoma State	3	–	4	–	0	4	–	6	–	0
Kansas State	3	–	4	–	0	3	–	7	–	0
Colorado	1	–	6	–	0	2	–	8	–	0
Iowa State	0	–	7	–	0	1	–	8	–	1
$ – Conference champion; Rankings from AP Poll

The 1964 Kansas Jayhawks football team was an American football team that represented the University of Kansas as a member of the Big Eight Conference during the 1964 NCAA University Division football season. In their seventh year under head coach Jack Mitchell, the Jayhawks compiled a 6–4 record (5–2 in conference game), finished third in the Big Eight, and were outscored by a total of 146 to 136. In games against ranked opponents, they lost to No. 9 Syracuse and No. 5 Nebraska.

Senior running back Gale Sayers led the Big Eight in rushing for the third consecutive year and broke the conference career rushing record. Sayers was also a consensus pick on the 1964 All-America college football team. Three Jayhawks received first-team honors on the 1964 All-Big Eight Conference football team: Sayers; defensive tackle Brian Schweda; and defensive back Gary Duff.

Kansas played home games at Memorial Stadium in Lawrence, Kansas.

== Schedule ==
Date	Opponent	Site	Result	Attendance	Source
September 19	TCU*	Memorial Stadium; Lawrence, KS	W 7–3	38,000	
September 26	at Syracuse*	Archbold Stadium; Syracuse, NY	L 6–38	28,000	
October 3	Wyoming*	Memorial Stadium; Lawrence, KS	L 14–17	38,000	
October 10	at Iowa State	Clyde Williams Field; Ames, IA	W 42–6	20,000	
October 17	Oklahoma	Memorial Stadium; Lawrence, KS	W 15–14	44,000	
October 24	at Oklahoma State	Lewis Field; Stillwater, OK	W 14–13	36,500	
October 31	at Kansas State	Memorial Stadium; Manhattan, KS (rivalry)	W 7–0	21,300	
November 7	No. 5 Nebraska^{†}	Memorial Stadium; Lawrence, KS (rivalry)	L 7–14	45,000	
November 14	Colorado	Memorial Stadium; Lawrence, KS	W 10–7	37,000	
November 21	at Missouri	Memorial Stadium; Columbia, MO (Border War)	L 14–34	50,000	
*Non-conference game; ^{†}Homecoming; Rankings from AP Poll released prior to the game; Source:

== Game summaries ==
=== Vs. Oklahoma ===
Team	1	2	3	4	Total
Sooners	0	14	0	0	14
• Jayhawks	7	0	0	8	15

- Date: October 17
- Location: Memorial Stadium, Lawrence, Kansas
- Game attendance: 42,130

Scoring summary
1		KU	Gale Sayers 93-yard kickoff return (Gary Duff kick)	Kansas 7–0
2		OU	Grisham 1-yard run (Metcalf kick)	Tied 7–7
2		OU	Rentzel 6-yard run (Metcalf kick)	OU 14–7
4	0:00	KU	Bob Skahan 26-yard run (Mike Johnson run)	Kansas 15–14

=== Vs. Nebraska ===
Team	1	2	3	4	Total
• No. 5 Cornhuskers	7	7	0	0	14
Jayhawks	0	7	0	0	7

- Date: November 7
- Location: Memorial Stadium, Lawrence, Kansas
- Game attendance: 44,509

Scoring summary
1	2:32	Neb	Freeman White 92-yard pass from Bob Churchich (Duncan Drum kick)	Nebraska 7–0
2	14:25	KU	Ron Oelschlager 3-yard run (Gary Duff kick)	Tied 7–7
2	8:46	Neb	Bob Hohn 1-yard run (Drum kick)	Nebraska 14–7

== Roster ==
1964 Kansas Jayhawks football team roster
Players
Coaches
Offense

Pos.	#	Name	Class
RB	48	Gale Sayers	Sr
RB		Ron Oelschlager	Sr
QB		Bob Skahan

Defense

Pos.	#	Name	Class

Special teams

Pos.	#	Name	Class

Head coach

Jack Mitchell

Coordinators/assistant coaches

Legend

- (C) Team captain
- (S) Suspended
- (I) Ineligible
- Injured
- Redshirt

== Statistics ==
Team statistics. On offense, the Jayhawks gained an average of 71.1 passing yards and 189.6 rushing yards per game. They ranked fifth in the Big Eight Conference with an average of 13.6 yards per game.

On defense, they gave up an average of 106.1 passing yards and 185.3 rushing yards per games. They ranked third in the Big Eight in scoring defense, giving up an average of 14.6 points per game.

Passing. Quarterback Bob Skahan completed 41 of 78 passes (52.6%) for 550 yards with two touchdowns, one interception, and a 117.7 passer rating.

Rushing. Senior Gale Sayers led the team with 633 rushing yards on 122 carries, an average of 5.2 yards per carry. Sayers led the Big Eight in rushing for the third year. He also broke Dave Hoppmann's Big Eight career rushing record.

Sayers was followed in rushing yardage by Ron Oelschlager (431 yard), Bob Skahan (276 yards), Mike Johnson (238 yards), Steve Ranko (144 yards), and Bill Gerhards (99 yards).

Receiving. Sayers also led the team in receiving with 17 catches for 182 yards. Sayers was followed by George Hornung (10 receptions, 149 yards), Mike Johnson (9 receptions, 118 yards), and Sandy Buda (7 receptions, 118 yards).

Scoring. Sayers led the team in scoring with 25 points on four rushing touchdowns. Bob Skahan and Ron Oelschlager followed with 18 points each.

== Awards and honors ==
Running back Gale Sayers, nicknamed the "Kansas Comet", was the team captain, was a consensus pick for the 1964 All-America college football team, receiving first-team honors from, among others, the American Football Coaches Association, Associated Press, United Press International, and Look magazine/Football Writers Association of America. He was inducted into the College Football Hall of Fame in 1977. His No. 48 jersey has been retired by the Kansas football program.

Three Jayhawks received first-team honors on the 1964 All-Big Eight Conference football team: Sayers (AP-1, UPI-1); defensive tackle Brian Schweda (AP-1); and defensive back Gary Duff (AP-1).

== 1965 NFL draft ==
Player	Round	Pick	Position	Club
Gale Sayers	1	4	Running back	Chicago Bears
Brian Schweda	8	101	Tackle	Chicago Bears
Mike Shinn	8	108	End	Green Bay Packers

- Gale Sayers was also drafted by the Kansas City Chiefs in the first round of the 1965 American Football League draft.
