= 1964 Nebraska Cornhuskers football team =

American college football season

1964 Nebraska Cornhuskers football

Big 8 champion

Cotton Bowl Classic, L 7–10 vs. Arkansas
- Conference: Big Eight Conference

Ranking
- Coaches: No. 6
- AP: No. 6
- Record: 9–2 (6–1 Big 8)
- Head coach: Bob Devaney (3rd season)
- Home stadium: Memorial Stadium

1964 Big Eight Conference football standings
	Conf.					Overall
Team	W		L		T	W		L		T
No. 6 Nebraska $	6	–	1	–	0	9	–	2	–	0
Oklahoma	5	–	1	–	1	6	–	4	–	1
Kansas	5	–	2	–	0	6	–	4	–	0
Missouri	4	–	2	–	1	6	–	3	–	1
Oklahoma State	3	–	4	–	0	4	–	6	–	0
Kansas State	3	–	4	–	0	3	–	7	–	0
Colorado	1	–	6	–	0	2	–	8	–	0
Iowa State	0	–	7	–	0	1	–	8	–	1
$ – Conference champion; Rankings from AP Poll

The 1964 Nebraska Cornhuskers football team was the representative of the University of Nebraska and member of the Big Eight Conference in the 1964 NCAA University Division football season. The team was coached by Bob Devaney and played their home games at Memorial Stadium in Lincoln, Nebraska.

== Schedule ==
Date	Time	Opponent	Rank	Site	TV	Result	Attendance	Source
September 19	2:00 p.m.	South Dakota*		Memorial Stadium; Lincoln, NE		W 56–0	38,625	
September 26	1:30 p.m.	at Minnesota*		Memorial Stadium; Minneapolis, MN (rivalry)	NBC	W 26–21	49,769	
October 3	12:30 p.m.	at Iowa State		Clyde Williams Field; Ames, IA (rivalry)		W 14–7	22,000	
October 10	2:00 p.m.	South Carolina*	No. 8	Memorial Stadium; Lincoln, NE		W 28–6	47,874	
October 17	2:00 p.m.	Kansas State^{†}	No. 6	Memorial Stadium; Lincoln, NE (rivalry)		W 47–0	45,800	
October 24	2:30 p.m.	at Colorado	No. 5	Folsom Field; Boulder, CO (rivalry)		W 21–3	42,900	
October 31	2:00 p.m.	Missouri	No. 5	Memorial Stadium; Lincoln, NE (rivalry)		W 9–0	48,875	
November 7	1:30 p.m.	at Kansas	No. 5	Memorial Stadium; Lawrence, KS (rivalry)		W 14–7	45,000	
November 14	2:00 p.m.	Oklahoma State	No. 4	Memorial Stadium; Lincoln, NE		W 27–14	49,500	
November 21	1:30 p.m.	at Oklahoma	No. 4	Oklahoma Memorial Stadium; Norman, OK (rivalry)		L 7–17	55,000	
January 1	1:00 p.m.	vs. No. 2 Arkansas*	No. 6	Cotton Bowl; Dallas, TX (Cotton Bowl Classic)	CBS	L 7–10	75,504	
*Non-conference game; ^{†}Homecoming; Rankings from AP Poll released prior to the game; All times are in Central time; Source:

== Roster ==
Official Roster
67 Allers, LaVerne LG (So.); 77 Barnes, Walter RT (Jr.); 76 Brichacek, Gary RT (So.); 42 Brown, Bill FB (So.); 73 Brown, James LT (Jr.); 40 Brunk, Kenny FB (So.); 78 Carlson, Dennis LT (Jr.); 21 Carstens, Kaye HB (So.); 89 Casey, Larry E (Jr.); 15 Churchich, Bob QB (So.); 62 Coleman, (Edward) Ricard RG (So.); 80 Coleman, Langston E (So.); 70 Czap, Dick RT (So.); 66 Dervin, John LG (Sr.); 82 Doepke, Charles E (Sr.); 55 Drum, Duncan C (Sr.); 10 Duda, Fred QB (Jr.); 19 Earl, William E (So.); 16 Everett, Don QB (So.); 81 Grace, Mike E (So.); 57 Grell, Stan LG (So.); 65 Griesse, Ronald RG (Sr.); 79 Hansen, Larry RT (So.); 87 Haug, William E (Jr.); 53 Hill, Robert C (So.); 18 Hohn, Robert HB (Sr.); 84 Jeter, Tony E (Jr.); 28 Johnson, William HB (Jr.); 69 Kennedy, Michael LG (Jr.); 35 Kirby, Pat HB (So.); 20 Kirkland, Ron HB (So.); 86 Koinzan, John E (Sr.); 75 Kramer, Larry LT (Sr.); 61 Kudrna, Roger LG (So.); 88 Love, Preston E (Sr.); 71 Mahlock, Richard RT (So.); 32 McCloughan, Kent HB (Sr.)	68 McGinn, Bernard RG (Sr.); 41 McNulty, Joe FB (Sr.); 29 Myslenski, Rick E (Jr.); 56 Narish, Louis C (So.); 59 Osberg, James LG (So.); 34 Pappas, Tom LG (So.); 33 Paschell, Willie HB (Sr.); 38 Pavoris, Ed LG (Jr.); 54 Petersen, Kelly C (So.); 26 Poggemeyer, Ronald HB (So.); 30 Ratzloff, Mike E (So.); 23 Rudd, Michael RG (Jr.); 51 Schaefer, Steve C (Jr.); 63 Senkbeil, Lynn RG (So.); 64 Shoda, Tim RG (So.); 52 Sittler, Lyle C (Sr.); 22 Smidt, Maynard HB (Sr.); 43 Smith, Bruce FB (Sr.); 83 Smith, Tom E (So.); 45 Solich, Frank FB (Jr.); 72 Stith, Carel RT (So.); 74 Strohmyer, John LT (Jr.); 48 Tatman, Pete FB (So.); 25 Thorell, Dennis HB (So.); 12 Tucker, Douglas QB (Sr.); 50 Tuthill, Harry C (Jr.); 58 Unis, Joe LG (So.); 46 Vactor, Theodore (Red) HB (Jr.); 36 Wachholtz, Larry HB (So.); 47 Weiman, Bob FB (So.); 85 White, Freeman E (Jr.); 39 Wilks, Jerry LT (So.); 31 Wilson, Harry HB (So.); 11 Woods, Henry QB (Jr.); 49 Worley, Michael FB (Jr.); 27 Wright, Ted HB (Jr.)

== Depth chart ==
Defensive starters

HB
Larry Wachholtz
Wayne Weber.

HB
Ted Vactor
Kaye Carstens

LB	LB
Michael Kennedy	Bernard McGinn
Roger Kudrna	Rick Coleman

CB
William Johnson
Maynard Smidt

DE	DT	NT	DT	DE
Langston Coleman	Dick Czap	Walter Barnes	John Strohmyer	Mike Grace
William Haug	Carel Stith	Harry Tuthill	Dennis Carlson.	John Koinzan

CB
Joe McNulty
Pete Tateman

Offensive starters

TE
Freeman White
Preston Love

LG	C	RG	LT	RT
John Dervin	Lyle Sittler	Ron Griesse	Larry Kramer	Dennis Carlson
LaVerne Allers	Duncan Drum	Lynn Senkbeil	James Brown	Gary Brichacek

TE
Tony Jeter
Charles Doepke

QB
Bob Churchich
Fred Duda
Doug Tucker

LB	FB	RB
Kent McCloughan	Frank Solich	Bobby Hohn
Ron Kirkland	Bruce Smith	Harry Wilson

== Coaching staff ==
Name	Title	First year in this position	Years at Nebraska	Alma mater
Bob Devaney	Head coach	1962	1962–1972	Alma
Tom Osborne		1964	1964–1997	Hastings
John Melton		1962	1962–1988	Wyoming
Cletus Fischer		1960	1960–1985	Nebraska
Mike Corgan	Running Backs	1962	1962–1982	Notre Dame
George Kelly		1960	1960–1968	
Jim Ross		1962	1962–1976	
Carl Selmer	Offensive Line	1962	1962–1972	

== Game summaries ==
=== South Dakota ===
Team	1	2	3	4	Total
South Dakota	0	0	0	0	0
• Nebraska	9	26	8	13	56

- Location: Memorial Stadium, Lincoln, Nebraska
- Game attendance: 38,625

=== Minnesota ===
Team	1	2	3	4	Total
• Nebraska	0	12	0	14	26
Minnesota	0	7	7	7	21

- Location: Memorial Stadium, Minneapolis
- Game attendance: 49,769

=== Iowa State ===
Team	1	2	3	4	Total
• Nebraska	0	7	7	0	14
Iowa State	0	0	7	0	7

- Location: Clyde Williams Field, Ames, Iowa
- Game attendance: 21,185

=== South Carolina ===
Team	1	2	3	4	Total
South Carolina	0	0	0	6	6
• #8 Nebraska	7	14	0	7	28

- Location: Memorial Stadium, Lincoln, Nebraska
- Game attendance: 47,874

=== Kansas State ===
Team	1	2	3	4	Total
Kansas State	0	0	0	0	0
• #6 Nebraska	14	13	13	7	47

- Date: October 17
- Location: Memorial Stadium, Lincoln, Nebraska
- Game attendance: 46,056

=== Colorado ===
Team	1	2	3	4	Total
• #5 Nebraska	0	7	6	8	21
Colorado	3	0	0	0	3

- Date: October 24
- Location: Folsom Field, Boulder, Colorado
- Game attendance: 41,472

=== Missouri ===
Team	1	2	3	4	Total
Missouri	0	0	0	0	0
• #5 Nebraska	0	0	0	9	9

- Date: October 31
- Location: Memorial Stadium, Lincoln, Nebraska
- Game attendance: 48,878

=== Kansas ===
Team	1	2	3	4	Total
• #5 Nebraska	7	7	0	0	14
Kansas	0	7	0	0	7

- Date: November 7
- Location: Memorial Stadium, Lawrence, Kansas
- Game attendance: 44,509

=== Oklahoma State ===
Team	1	2	3	4	Total
Oklahoma State	0	7	7	0	14
• #4 Nebraska	7	14	0	6	27

- Date: November 14
- Location: Memorial Stadium, Lincoln, Nebraska
- Game attendance: 49,013

=== Oklahoma ===
Team	1	2	3	4	Total
#4 Nebraska	0	7	0	0	7
• Oklahoma	3	0	0	14	17

- Date: November 21
- Location: Oklahoma Memorial Stadium, Norman, Oklahoma
- Game attendance: 54,552

=== Arkansas ===
Team	1	2	3	4	Total
#6 Nebraska	0	7	0	0	7
• #2 Arkansas	3	0	0	7	10

- Date: January 1
- Location: Cotton Bowl, Dallas
- Game attendance: 75,504

== Rankings ==
Ranking movements Legend: ██ Increase in ranking ██ Decrease in ranking — = Not ranked
	Week											
Poll	Pre	1	2	3	4	5	6	7	8	9	10	Final
AP	—	—	—	—	8	6	5	5	5	4	4	6
Coaches	N/A	N/A	N/A	N/A	N/A	N/A	N/A	N/A	N/A	N/A	N/A	6

== Awards ==
- All American: Larry Kramer
- National Lineman of the Year: Robert Brown
- All Big 8: Walt Barnes, Tony Jeter, Larry Kramer, Kent McCloughan, Lyle Sittler, Freeman White, Ted Vactor

== Future professional players ==
- James Brown, 1966 13th-round pick of the St. Louis Cardinals
- Dick Czap, 1966 12th-round pick of the Cleveland Browns
- Tony Jeter, 1966 3rd-round pick of the Green Bay Packers
- Larry Kramer, 1964 15th-round pick of the Baltimore Colts
- Preston Love, 1965 19th-round pick of the Detroit Lions
- Kent McCloughan, 1965 3rd-round pick of the Washington Redskins
- Lynn Senkbeil, 1966 16th-round pick of the Chicago Bears
- Freeman White, 1966 9th-round pick of the New York Giants
