= 1964 Oklahoma State Cowboys football team =

American college football season

1964 Oklahoma State Cowboys football
- Conference: Big Eight Conference
- Record: 4–6 (3–4 Big 8)
- Head coach: Phil Cutchin (2nd season)
- Home stadium: Lewis Field

1964 Big Eight Conference football standings
	Conf.					Overall
Team	W		L		T	W		L		T
No. 6 Nebraska $	6	–	1	–	0	9	–	2	–	0
Oklahoma	5	–	1	–	1	6	–	4	–	1
Kansas	5	–	2	–	0	6	–	4	–	0
Missouri	4	–	2	–	1	6	–	3	–	1
Oklahoma State	3	–	4	–	0	4	–	6	–	0
Kansas State	3	–	4	–	0	3	–	7	–	0
Colorado	1	–	6	–	0	2	–	8	–	0
Iowa State	0	–	7	–	0	1	–	8	–	1
$ – Conference champion; Rankings from AP Poll

The 1964 Oklahoma State Cowboys football team represented Oklahoma State University–Stillwater in the Big Eight Conference during the 1964 NCAA University Division football season. In their second season under head coach Phil Cutchin, the Cowboys compiled a 4–6 record (3–4 against conference opponents), tied for fifth place in the conference, and were outscored by opponents by a combined total of 192 to 165.

On offense, the 1964 team averaged 16.5 points scored, 139.7 rushing yards, and 81.0 passing yards per game. On defense, the team allowed an average of 19.2 points scored, 222.6 rushing yards, and 128.1 passing yards per game. The team's statistical leaders included Walt Garrison with 730 rushing yards, Glenn Baxter with 845 passing yards, Tony Sellari with 238 receiving yards, and placekicker Charles Durkee with 37 points scored.

End Jack Jacobson was selected as a first-team All-Big Eight Conference player.

The team played its home games at Lewis Field in Stillwater, Oklahoma.

== Schedule ==
Date	Opponent	Site	Result	Attendance	Source
September 19	at Arkansas*	War Memorial Stadium; Little Rock, AR	L 10–14	40,000	
September 26	Iowa State	Lewis Field; Stillwater, OK	W 29–14	17,500	
October 3	at Missouri	Memorial Stadium; Columbia, MO	W 10–7	44,000	
October 10	Colorado	Lewis Field; Stillwater, OK	W 14–10	22,000	
October 24	Kansas^{†}	Lewis Field; Stillwater, OK	L 13–14	36,500	
October 31	at Tulsa*	Skelly Stadium; Tulsa, OK (rivalry)	L 14–61	23,731	
November 7	Wichita State*	Lewis Field; Stillwater, OK	W 31–7	19,000	
November 14	at No. 4 Nebraska	Memorial Stadium; Lincoln, NE	L 14–27	49,500	
November 21	at Kansas State	Memorial Stadium; Manhattan, KS	L 14–17	9,500	
November 28	Oklahoma	Lewis Field; Stillwater, OK (Bedlam Series)	L 16–21	37,000	
*Non-conference game; ^{†}Homecoming; Rankings from AP Poll released prior to the game; Source:

== After the season ==
The 1965 NFL draft was held on November 28, 1964. The following Cowboy was selected.

Round	Pick	Player	Position	NFL club
13	179	Jack Jacobson	Back	Detroit Lions
