= 1964 Kansas State Wildcats football team =

American college football season

1964 Kansas State Wildcats football
- Conference: Big Eight Conference
- Record: 3–7 (3–4 Big 8)
- Head coach: Doug Weaver (5th season)
- Home stadium: Memorial Stadium

1964 Big Eight Conference football standings
	Conf.					Overall
Team	W		L		T	W		L		T
No. 6 Nebraska $	6	–	1	–	0	9	–	2	–	0
Oklahoma	5	–	1	–	1	6	–	4	–	1
Kansas	5	–	2	–	0	6	–	4	–	0
Missouri	4	–	2	–	1	6	–	3	–	1
Oklahoma State	3	–	4	–	0	4	–	6	–	0
Kansas State	3	–	4	–	0	3	–	7	–	0
Colorado	1	–	6	–	0	2	–	8	–	0
Iowa State	0	–	7	–	0	1	–	8	–	1
$ – Conference champion; Rankings from AP Poll

The 1964 Kansas State Wildcats football team represented Kansas State University in the 1964 NCAA University Division football season. The team's head football coach was Doug Weaver. The Wildcats played their home games in Memorial Stadium for the second to last year. The Wildcats finished the season with a 3–7 record with a 3–4 record in conference play. They finished in a tie for seventh place. The Wildcats scored 64 points and gave up 186 points.

== Schedule ==
Date	Opponent	Site	TV	Result	Attendance	Source
September 19	at Wisconsin*	Camp Randall Stadium; Madison, WI	NBC	L 7–17	46,455	
October 3	at Colorado	Folsom Field; Boulder, CO (rivalry)		W 16–14	29,600	
October 10	Missouri	Memorial Stadium; Manhattan, KS		L 0–7	18,321	
October 17	at No. 6 Nebraska	Memorial Stadium; Lincoln, NE (rivalry)		L 0–47	45,800	
October 24	at Oklahoma	Oklahoma Memorial Stadium; Norman, OK		L 0–44	46,600	
October 31	Kansas^{†}	Memorial Stadium; Manhattan, KS (rivalry)		L 0–7	21,300	
November 7	at Arizona State*	Sun Devil Stadium; Tempe, AZ		L 10–21	32,026	
November 14	Iowa State	Memorial Stadium; Manhattan, KS (rivalry)		W 7–6	15,738	
November 21	Oklahoma State	Memorial Stadium; Manhattan, KS		W 17–14	9,500	
November 28	at New Mexico*	University Stadium; Albuquerque, NM		L 7–9	20,443	
*Non-conference game; ^{†}Homecoming; Rankings from AP Poll released prior to the game; Source:
