= 1964 Wyoming Cowboys football team =

American college football season

1964 Wyoming Cowboys football
- Conference: Western Athletic Conference
- Record: 6–2–2 (2–2 WAC)
- Head coach: Lloyd Eaton (3rd season)
- Captains: Dick Barry; Jeff Hartman; Bill Levine
- Home stadium: War Memorial Stadium

1964 Western Athletic Conference football standings
	Conf.					Overall
Team	W		L		T	W		L		T
New Mexico +	3	–	1	–	0	9	–	2	–	0
Utah +	3	–	1	–	0	9	–	2	–	0
Arizona +	3	–	1	–	0	6	–	3	–	1
Wyoming	2	–	2	–	0	6	–	2	–	2
Arizona State	0	–	2	–	0	8	–	2	–	0
BYU	0	–	4	–	0	3	–	6	–	1
+ – Conference co-champions

The 1964 Wyoming Cowboys football team was an American football team that represented the University of Wyoming as a member of the Western Athletic Conference (WAC) during the 1964 NCAA University Division football season. In their third season under head coach Lloyd Eaton, the Cowboys compiled a 6–2–2 record (2–2 against conference opponents), finished fourth in the WAC, and outscored opponents by a total of 181 to 117. Dick Barry, Jeff Hartman, and Bill Levine were the team captains.

== Schedule ==
Date	Opponent	Site	Result	Attendance	Source
September 19	Colorado State*	War Memorial Stadium; Laramie, WY (rivalry)	W 31–7	17,014	
September 26	at Washington State*	Rogers Field; Pullman, WA	W 28–7	17,500	
October 3	at Kansas*	Memorial Stadium; Lawrence, KS	W 17–14	38,000	
October 10	Utah	War Memorial Stadium; Laramie, WY	W 14–13	19,831	
October 17	Texas Western*	War Memorial Stadium; Laramie, WY	W 20–6	10,831	
October 24	at Arizona	Arizona Stadium; Tucson, AZ	L 7–15	26,500	
October 31	New Mexico	War Memorial Stadium; Laramie, WY	L 6–17	18,107	
November 7	at Utah State*	Romney Stadium; Logan, UT (rivalry)	T 20–20	11,209	
November 14	at Air Force*	Falcon Stadium; Colorado Springs, CO	T 7–7	25,224–25,244	
November 21	at BYU	Cougar Stadium; Provo, UT	W 31–11	12,906	
*Non-conference game
