= 1964 Iowa State Cyclones football team =

American college football season

1964 Iowa State Cyclones football
- Conference: Big Eight Conference
- Record: 1–8–1 (0–7 Big 8)
- Head coach: Clay Stapleton (7th season)
- Captain: Mike Cox
- Home stadium: Clyde Williams Field

1964 Big Eight Conference football standings
	Conf.					Overall
Team	W		L		T	W		L		T
No. 6 Nebraska $	6	–	1	–	0	9	–	2	–	0
Oklahoma	5	–	1	–	1	6	–	4	–	1
Kansas	5	–	2	–	0	6	–	4	–	0
Missouri	4	–	2	–	1	6	–	3	–	1
Oklahoma State	3	–	4	–	0	4	–	6	–	0
Kansas State	3	–	4	–	0	3	–	7	–	0
Colorado	1	–	6	–	0	2	–	8	–	0
Iowa State	0	–	7	–	0	1	–	8	–	1
$ – Conference champion; Rankings from AP Poll

The 1964 Iowa State Cyclones football team represented Iowa State University in the Big Eight Conference during the 1964 NCAA University Division football season. In their seventh year under head coach Clay Stapleton, the Cyclones compiled a 1–8–1 record (0–7 against conference opponents), finished in last place in the conference, and were outscored by opponents by a combined total of 155 to 72. They played their home games at Clyde Williams Field in Ames, Iowa.

The regular starting lineup on offense consisted of left end Ernie Kun, left tackle Norm Taylor, left guard Wayne Lueders, center John Berrington, right guard Sam Ramenofsky, right tackle John Van Sicklen, right end Denny Alitz, quarterback Tim Van Galder, halfbacks Tom Vaughn and Ernie Kennedy, and fullback Mike Cox. Steve Balkovec was the punter placekicker. Mike Cox was the team captain.

The team's statistical leaders included Tom Vaughn with 497 rushing yards and 25 points scored (four touchdowns and an extra point), Tim Van Galder with 354 passing yards, Tony Baker with 76 receiving yards. Three Iowa State players were selected as first-team all-conference players: fullback Mike Cox, right tackle John Van Sicklen, and halfback Tom Vaughn.

== Schedule ==
Date	Time	Opponent	Site	TV	Result	Attendance	Source
September 19	1:30 pm	Drake*	Clyde Williams Field; Ames, IA		W 25–0	22,000	
September 26	2:30 pm	at Oklahoma State	Lewis Field; Stillwater, OK		L 14–29	17,500	
October 3	1:30 pm	Nebraska	Clyde Williams Field; Ames, IA (rivalry)		L 7–14	22,000	
October 10	1:30 pm	Kansas	Clyde Williams Field; Ames, IA		L 6–42	20,000	
October 17	1:30 pm	Colorado^{†}	Clyde Williams Field; Ames, IA		L 7–14	20,000	
October 24	2:00 pm	at Missouri	Memorial Stadium; Columbia, MO (rivalry)	NBC	L 0–10	45,000	
October 31	1:00 pm	at Army*	Michie Stadium; West Point, NY		L 7–9	22,154	
November 7	1:30 pm	at Oklahoma	Oklahoma Memorial Stadium; Norman, OK		L 0–30	42,000	
November 14	1:30 pm	at Kansas State	Memorial Stadium; Manhattan, KS (rivalry)		L 6–7	15,738	
November 21	9:00 pm	at Arizona*	Arizona Stadium; Tucson, AZ		T 0–0	24,000–24,595	
*Non-conference game; ^{†}Homecoming; All times are in Central time; Source:
