= 1964 Missouri Tigers football team =

American college football season

1964 Missouri Tigers football
- Conference: Big Eight Conference

Ranking
- Coaches: No. T–18
- Record: 6–3–1 (4–2–1 Big 8)
- Head coach: Dan Devine (7th season)
- Home stadium: Memorial Stadium

1964 Big Eight Conference football standings
| | Conf. | | | | | Overall |
| Team | W | | L | | T | W | | L | | T |
|---|---|---|---|---|---|---|---|---|---|---|
| No. 6 Nebraska $ | 6 | – | 1 | – | 0 | 9 | – | 2 | – | 0 |
| Oklahoma | 5 | – | 1 | – | 1 | 6 | – | 4 | – | 1 |
| Kansas | 5 | – | 2 | – | 0 | 6 | – | 4 | – | 0 |
| Missouri | 4 | – | 2 | – | 1 | 6 | – | 3 | – | 1 |
| Oklahoma State | 3 | – | 4 | – | 0 | 4 | – | 6 | – | 0 |
| Kansas State | 3 | – | 4 | – | 0 | 3 | – | 7 | – | 0 |
| Colorado | 1 | – | 6 | – | 0 | 2 | – | 8 | – | 0 |
| Iowa State | 0 | – | 7 | – | 0 | 1 | – | 8 | – | 1 |
$ – Conference champion; Rankings from AP Poll

The 1964 Missouri Tigers football team was an American football team that represented the University of Missouri in the Big Eight Conference (Big 8) during the 1964 NCAA University Division football season. The team compiled a 6–3–1 record (4–2–1 against Big 8 opponents), finished in fourth place in the Big 8, and outscored opponents by a combined total of 142 to 88. Dan Devine was the head coach for the seventh of 13 seasons. The team played its home games at Memorial Stadium in Columbia, Missouri.

The team's statistical leaders included Gary Lane with 432 rushing yards, 770 passing yards, 1,202 yards of total offense, and 26 points scored, Earl Denny with 222 receiving yards, and Charlie Brown with 26 points scored.

== Schedule ==
| Date | Opponent | Site | Result | Attendance | Source |
|---|---|---|---|---|---|
| September 19 | at California* | California Memorial Stadium; Berkeley, CA | L 14–21 | 42,000 | |
| September 26 | Utah* | Memorial Stadium; Columbia, MO | W 23–6 | 45,000 | |
| October 3 | Oklahoma State | Memorial Stadium; Columbia, MO | L 7–10 | 44,000 | |
| October 10 | at Kansas State | Memorial Stadium; Manhattan, KS | W 7–0 | 18,321 | |
| October 17 | at Air Force* | Falcon Stadium; Colorado Springs, CO | W 17–7 | 29,351 | |
| October 24 | Iowa State | Memorial Stadium; Columbia, MO (rivalry) | W 10–0 | 45,000 | |
| October 31 | at No. 5 Nebraska | Memorial Stadium; Lincoln, NE (rivalry) | L 0–9 | 48,875 | |
| November 7 | Colorado | Memorial Stadium; Columbia, MO | W 16–7 | 46,000 | |
| November 14 | at Oklahoma | Oklahoma Memorial Stadium; Norman, OK (rivalry) | T 14–14 | 52,000 | |
| November 21 | Kansas | Memorial Stadium; Columbia, MO (Border War) | W 34–14 | 50,000 | |
*Non-conference game; Rankings from AP Poll released prior to the game; Source:

== Personnel ==
- OT Francis Peay, Jr.
