= 1964 BYU Cougars football team =

American college football season

1964 BYU Cougars football
- Conference: Western Athletic Conference
- Record: 3–6–1 (0–4 WAC)
- Head coach: Tommy Hudspeth (1st season)
- Home stadium: Cougar Stadium

1964 Western Athletic Conference football standings
	Conf.					Overall
Team	W		L		T	W		L		T
New Mexico +	3	–	1	–	0	9	–	2	–	0
Utah +	3	–	1	–	0	9	–	2	–	0
Arizona +	3	–	1	–	0	6	–	3	–	1
Wyoming	2	–	2	–	0	6	–	2	–	2
Arizona State	0	–	2	–	0	8	–	2	–	0
BYU	0	–	4	–	0	3	–	6	–	1
+ – Conference co-champions

The 1964 BYU Cougars football team represented Brigham Young University (BYU) as a member of the Western Athletic Conference (WAC) during the 1964 NCAA University Division football season. In their first season under head coach Tommy Hudspeth, the Cougars compiled an overall record of 3–6–1 with a mark of 0–4 against conference opponents, finished last out of six teams in the WAC, and were outscored by a combined total of 210 to 173.

Quarterback Virgil Carter led the team with 1,154 passing yards, 1,542 yards of total offense, and 32 points scored. Other statistical leaders included John Ogden with 770 rushing yards and Bruce Smith with 470 receiving yards.

== Schedule ==
Date	Opponent	Site	Result	Attendance	Source
September 19	at Oregon*	Hayward Field; Eugene, OR	L 13–20	15,000	
September 26	at Arizona	Arizona Stadium; Tucson, AZ	L 6–39	27,400	
October 2	New Mexico	Cougar Stadium; Provo, UT	L 14–26	34,610	
October 10	at Colorado State*	Colorado Field; Fort Collins, CO	L 6–7	7,500	
October 17	Pacific (CA)*	Cougar Stadium; Provo, UT	W 21–0	12,817	
October 24	at Texas Western*	Sun Bowl; El Paso, TX	T 18–18	12,362	
October 31	Utah State*^{†}	Cougar Stadium; Provo, UT	W 28–14	29,922	
November 7	at Utah	Ute Stadium; Salt Lake City, UT	L 13–47	29,422	
November 14	Western Michigan*	Cougar Stadium; Provo, UT	W 43–8	6,863	
November 21	Wyoming	Cougar Stadium; Provo, UT	L 11–31	12,906	
*Non-conference game; ^{†}Homecoming
