= 1964 Colorado Buffaloes football team =

American college football season

1964 Colorado Buffaloes football
- Conference: Big Eight Conference
- Record: 2–8 (1–6 Big 8)
- Head coach: Eddie Crowder (2nd season)
- MVP: Tom Kresnak
- Captains: Jerry McClurg; Ted Somerville
- Home stadium: Folsom Field

1964 Big Eight Conference football standings
	Conf.					Overall
Team	W		L		T	W		L		T
No. 6 Nebraska $	6	–	1	–	0	9	–	2	–	0
Oklahoma	5	–	1	–	1	6	–	4	–	1
Kansas	5	–	2	–	0	6	–	4	–	0
Missouri	4	–	2	–	1	6	–	3	–	1
Oklahoma State	3	–	4	–	0	4	–	6	–	0
Kansas State	3	–	4	–	0	3	–	7	–	0
Colorado	1	–	6	–	0	2	–	8	–	0
Iowa State	0	–	7	–	0	1	–	8	–	1
$ – Conference champion; Rankings from AP Poll

The 1964 Colorado Buffaloes football team represented the University of Colorado as a member of the Big Eight Conference during the 1964 NCAA University Division football season. Led by second-year head coach Eddie Crowder, the Buffaloes were 2–8 overall and 1–6 in conference play, placing seventh in the Big 8. Colorado played home games on campus at Folsom Field in Boulder, Colorado.

== Schedule ==
Date	Opponent	Site	Result	Attendance	Source
September 18	at USC*	Los Angeles Memorial Coliseum; Los Angeles, CA	L 0–21	39,173	
September 26	Oregon State*	Folsom Field; Boulder, CO	L 7–14	17,500	
October 3	Kansas State	Folsom Field; Boulder, CO (rivalry)	L 14–16	29,600	
October 10	at Oklahoma State	Lewis Field; Stillwater, OK	L 10–14	22,000	
October 17	at Iowa State	Clyde Williams Field; Ames, IA	W 14–7	20,000	
October 24	No. 5 Nebraska^{†}	Folsom Field; Boulder, CO (rivalry)	L 3–21	42,900	
October 31	Oklahoma	Folsom Field; Boulder, CO	L 11–14	24,200	
November 7	at Missouri	Memorial Stadium; Columbia, MO	L 7–16	46,000	
November 14	at Kansas	Memorial Stadium; Lawrence, KS	L 7–10	37,000	
November 21	Air Force*	Folsom Field; Boulder, CO	W 28–23	26,500	
*Non-conference game; ^{†}Homecoming; Rankings from AP Poll released prior to the game; Source:
