= Ray Nagel =

American football player, coach, and administrator (1927–2015)

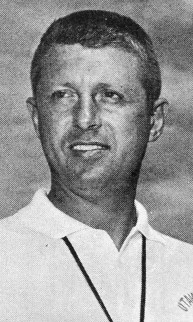

Biographical details
- Born: May 18, 1927; Detroit, Michigan, U.S.
- Died: January 15, 2015 (aged 87); San Antonio, Texas, U.S.

Playing career
- 1946–1949: UCLA
- 1953: Chicago Cardinals
- Positions: Quarterback, halfback

Coaching career (HC unless noted)
- 1954: Oklahoma (assistant)
- 1955–1957: UCLA (backfield)
- 1958–1965: Utah
- 1966–1970: Iowa

Administrative career (AD unless noted)
- 1971–1976: Washington State
- 1976–1983: Hawaii
- 1990–1995: Hula Bowl (exec. dir.)

Head coaching record
- Overall: 58–71–3
- Bowls: 1–0

Accomplishments and honors

Championships
- WAC (1964)

Awards
- WAC Coach of the Year (1964); Second-team All-PCC (1948)

Raymond Robert Nagel (May 18, 1927 – January 15, 2015) was an American football player, coach, and college athletics administrator. He was the head football coach at the University of Utah from 1958 to 1965 and the University of Iowa from 1966 to 1970, compiling a career college football coaching record of 58–71–3 (.455). After coaching, Nagel was the athletic director at Washington State University from 1971 to 1976 and the University of Hawaii at Manoa from 1976 to 1983. From 1990 to 1995, he was the executive director of the Hula Bowl, a college football invitational all-star game in Hawaii.

== Early years ==
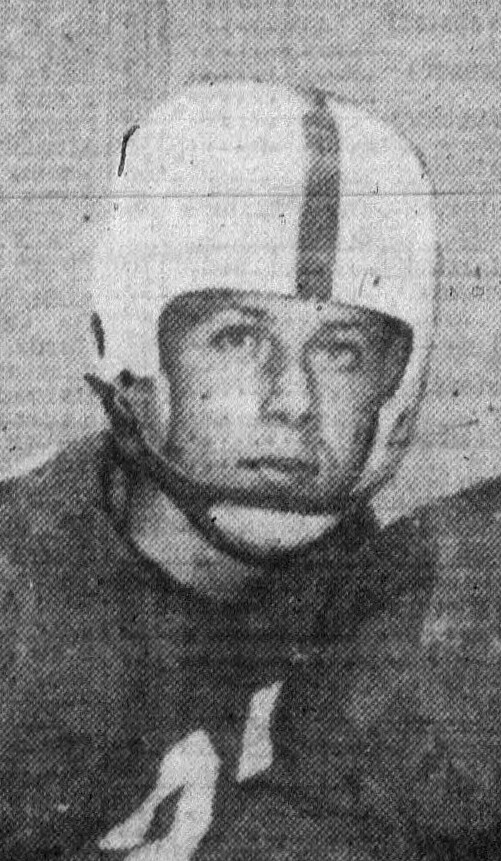
Nagle as a member of the 1947 UCLA Bruins football team.

Born in Detroit, Michigan, Nagel was raised in Southern California and attended Los Angeles High School during World War II. He played quarterback for the football team and was a third team all-city selection his senior season in 1944. Nagel graduated in 1945 and enrolled at the University of California, Los Angeles (UCLA), where he was a three time letter-winner from 1946 to 1949 as a quarterback and halfback for the Bruins. Nagel played for head coach Red Sanders and was named all-Pacific Coast Conference and UCLA's Most Improved Player. He later earned bachelor's, master's, and law degrees from UCLA and was an assistant coach for the Bruins' football team.

Nagel played one year of professional football at age 26, with the Chicago Cardinals of the National Football League (NFL) as a player and scout in 1953. In March 1954, he was hired as assistant coach at the University of Oklahoma under head coach Bud Wilkinson. After a season in Norman, he returned to UCLA as an assistant for three seasons under Sanders.

== Head coach ==
=== Utah ===
In January 1958, Nagel was named head coach at the University of Utah in Salt Lake City, then a member of the Skyline Conference. Just 30 years old with four young children, he was the youngest major college head coach at the time; he succeeded Jack Curtice, who left after eight seasons for Stanford University. Nagel's salary in 1958 was $12,000, a twenty percent increase from his previous position. Utah had won the conference title in 1957 with junior quarterback Lee Grosscup and sophomore safety Larry Wilson, a future member of the Pro Football Hall of Fame. Curtice accepted the Stanford job two weeks earlier, but delayed his departure until March to assist Nagel with the transition.

Nagel led the Utes for eight years, from 1958 through 1965. In 1962, he turned down the Nebraska job that eventually went to Bob Devaney, the head coach at conference rival Wyoming. That year Utah joined the new Western Athletic Conference (WAC) as a charter member. Nagel compiled a 42–39–1 (.518) record at Utah; his 1964 team was led by quarterback Pokey Allen, running back Ron Coleman, and receiver Roy Jefferson. They defeated West Virginia 32–6 in the Liberty Bowl, played indoors in New Jersey at the Atlantic City convention center, and finished with 9–2 record.

=== Iowa ===
Nagel was hired as the 21st head coach of Iowa football in December 1965. At age 38, he had just completed a 3–7 season in his eighth year at Utah, which led some to question his hiring. Some speculated at the time that finding a new coach had been difficult due to the problems which previous head coach Jerry Burns had reportedly experienced with athletic director Forest Evashevski. The Cedar Rapids Gazette reported, "At least four coaches either turned down the Hawkeye job or expressed no desire to talk about it." In five seasons as head coach, Burns' teams won just sixteen games, ending with a 1–9 record and a last place finish in the Big Ten in 1965.

Evy, as he was called, had compiled a 52–27–4 (.651) record as Iowa's head coach from 1952 through 1960. His teams won three Big Ten titles, two Rose Bowls, and finished in the top ten of the final AP Poll five times. Evashevski was understandably a popular figure with Iowa fans, a fact that would change over Nagel's tenure in Iowa City.

Nagel brought a talented coaching staff to Iowa; his assistants included George Seifert and Ted Lawrence. Lawrence had been the coach at Cedar Rapids Jefferson High School, and his son, Larry, was a star quarterback there.

The Hawkeyes were expected to be bad in 1966, and they met expectations. Iowa went 2–8, with the lowlight being a 56–7 blowout loss at second-ranked Michigan State. The Hawks yielded 607 total yards to the Spartans, including 268 rushing yards to tailback Clinton Jones, both Big Ten records. The following season, Iowa won its first game and failed to win another, ending at 1–8–1 in 1967. Its offense was adequate, led by junior Ed Podolak, but the defense was awful, giving up almost four touchdowns a game.

Nagel had a 3–16–1 (.175) record after two years, and he needed a good season in 1968. Behind Podolak and some solid sophomore players, including Larry Lawrence and running back Denny Green, Iowa had one of its best seasons in years. Iowa had one of the most explosive offenses in Big Ten Conference history in 1968. The highlight of the season was a 68–34 win over Northwestern. Iowa had 639 yards of total offense, led by Podolak's 286 rushing yards. Both marks were Big Ten records, breaking the previous records that had been set against the Hawkeyes by Michigan State two years earlier.

The 1968 Hawkeyes broke twenty school and conference offensive records. They broke the Big Ten season scoring record with 256 points in conference games, as well as the record for total offense with a 482 yards per game average. The Hawks smashed Michigan's record of 34.5 points per game in conference play in 1943 by averaging 36.6 points per game. The 1968 Hawks became the highest scoring team in school history, breaking the mark set by the 1900 Hawkeyes. Although Iowa did not have a winning record for a seventh consecutive year, going 5–5 on the season, Iowa's four conference wins were the most for Iowa since 1960. Most Hawkeye fans felt that the team had turned a corner and were expecting big things in 1969, since Iowa had only five senior starters in 1968. Nagel was also optimistic. "I'm not predicting we'll win the Big Ten championship next season, but I definitely feel we'll be in title contention," Nagel said.

==== The Black Boycott ====
The late 1960s were volatile, with Vietnam War protests and the civil rights movement gaining full steam. In the spring of 1969, Nagel dismissed Greg Allison and Charles Bolden, both black football players, from the team for "personal problems." He did not, however, rule out reinstating them in the fall. Although Nagel never specified what the personal problems were, it was widely rumored that Allison was having grade problems and that Bolden had had a brush with the law. Six weeks later, Bolden pleaded guilty to a bad check charge and was ordered to make restitution on a number of bad checks.

Jerry Stevens, the president of the Afro-American Student Association of Iowa, had earlier called for negotiations to end what he termed "an intolerable situation" for black athletes at Iowa. Led by Stevens and other members of his group, some black members of the Iowa football team objected to the manner in which Allison and Bolden were dismissed and demanded an apology from Nagel, which he gave. Still, rumors flew that Stevens' group was organizing a "black boycott" of the football team's upcoming spring practice.

Nagel reiterated his longstanding policy with regard to unexcused absences from practice. He had set a precedent on the matter in his first season in 1966 when he dismissed star end Rich O'Hara from the squad when O'Hara failed to appear for practice. That afternoon, sixteen black players boycotted spring practice, and Nagel immediately dismissed them from the team. Only four black players broke the boycott and appeared for spring practice: Mel Morris, Ray Manning, William "Zoom Zoom" Powell, and Don Osby.

Two days later, the newly formed Black Athletes Union presented a letter to several Iowa newspapers. It read, in part, "Brought into focus here is the slave-master relationship. The black athlete, for example, is the gladiator who performs in the arena for the pleasure of the white masses. He is brought from the black colony, typically called high school, which is predominantly black...The black gladiator brought into this oppressive environment, representing approximately one percent of the populace, is trained to razor athletic sharpness and used to thrill the white spectator masses...The requirements of eligibility do not meet those of graduation. Why? Simply because it was not intended that the black athlete graduate. At the end of four years, the black gladiator is tossed back into the colony exhausted from his toil and exploitation in the mother country. It is intended that he be physically exhausted because he potentially represents the greatest threat to this society, politically and revolutionary."

Three days later, it was reported that the seven freshmen who were among the sixteen dismissed black players had disassociated themselves from the BAU and wanted to return to the team. That same day, the BAU released a list of five demands to the university's athletic board, all minor in scope. The following day, the chairman of the athletic board said that Iowa would grant their demands. Further, he stated that he was presented with these demands by a group of black athletes two days before the boycott of practice and had told them then that their requests would be granted. The athletes had been persuaded to boycott anyway.

Spring practice ended with the situation unresolved, and it remained that way until the day before fall practice. Nagel announced that those boycotting players that wanted to be reinstated could make an individual appeal to the team for reinstatement, and that the team would conduct a vote on whether or not to allow them to rejoin the team. Twelve of the sixteen boycotting players appealed for reinstatement, and the team voted to allow seven of them to rejoin the squad. The seven players allowed back on the team included five of the sophomores who had broken from the BAU and just two veterans. One of the two veterans allowed back was Dennis Green, a future college and NFL head coach.

It was announced the following day that one of the black players voted back onto the team would need a season-ending hernia operation. In addition, two white players would also miss the season, one from injuries stemming from a motorcycle accident and one due to academics. These three players, plus the nine black players who were not reinstated, plus Allison and Bolden, made it a total of fourteen players who were expected to play after the 1968 season who would not return in 1969.

The "Black Boycott" left some scars on both sides and may have been the first push toward the ouster of Nagel, who seemed to have turned the corner the previous season. Iowa was 5–5 in 1969; the season was both disappointing and encouraging. The Hawkeyes had failed to post a winning record and did not contend for the Big Ten title, but considering all of the off-season turmoil caused by the boycott, the record could have been worse. Optimism was high for the 1970 season, as there were a lot of young players returning from the 1969 squad.

==== Feud with Evashevski ====
Less than twelve months after the Black Boycott, the athletic department found itself in a state of turmoil again. Nagel had one year left on his contract, and he was looking for an extension. Rumors of a feud between Nagel and Evashevski had existed for years. In December 1969, Ted Lawrence, Iowa's freshman coach and the father of Iowa quarterback Larry Lawrence, resigned to take a job in the private sector. Lawrence later blasted Nagel and his coaching staff for having a lack of compassion for their players.

In January 1970, Nagel dismissed offensive line coach Gary Grouwinkel for "disloyalty," which Grouwinkel later revealed was his allegiance to Evy instead of Nagel. Less than one month later, star quarterback Larry Lawrence and fullback Tom Smith quit the team and transferred to Miami, loudly proclaiming that they would never stay and play for Nagel.

About two weeks later, Lawrence's roommate, a non-athlete, submitted to the Iowa Board of Athletics a written statement charging Evy with participating in a rebellion aimed at getting Nagel fired and that would allow Evy to succeed him as head football coach. Lawrence's roommate stated that Lawrence was recruited to gather player support for Nagel's removal, but that Lawrence's efforts were unproductive. Evy vehemently denied the charges, and Iowa's athletic board took no action.

In May 1970, the state auditor of Iowa announced that the athletic department was under investigation for "padded expense accounts." Nagel not only denied wrongdoing but claimed that they were shown how to fill out their expense accounts by Evashevski himself. Charges and counter-charges followed, and after a long investigation, the Iowa Board of Athletics relieved both Evashevski and Nagel of their respective duties on May 19, 1970.

Nagel immediately fired back. "The reason given to me for my dismissal was the general disharmony within the athletic department during the last four months. I cannot be satisfied with this reason...Hasn't there been disharmony for 18 years, through the Paul Brechler, Jerry Burns, and Ray Nagel eras?" Evashevski had been an icon in Iowa, a man who led Iowa to three Big Ten titles and two Rose Bowls, while Nagel had a 13–26–1 (.338) record in four seasons. Nevertheless, strong support was voiced for Nagel across the state of Iowa. Gus Schrader of the Cedar Rapids Gazette wrote, "We have heard dozens of fans say, 'I'd just like to see Nagel coach out his contract without Evashevski looking over his shoulder on every move.'"

==== Rehiring ====
The Iowa attorney general submitted a report to the university's board of athletics that stated, in part, "Mr. Evashevski's attitudes and other things he has done all tend to support the view of Coach Nagel and four of his five assistants that this is part of a vendetta against him...(Evashevski) did the university and people of Iowa, many of whom have almost worshipped him, a great disservice."

The support was so strong that a few days later, in what Maury White of the Des Moines Register called an event that "may rank as the most startling reversal since the discovery of the boomerang." Nagel was rehired to serve the last year of his contract, while Evashevski was replaced by Bump Elliott.

Nagel's Hawks were 3–6–1 in 1970 and he was understandably emotionally exhausted. At the awards banquet shortly after the last game, he made a speech praising his seniors and categorizing Iowa's football future as bright. But then his voice wavered, and Nagel said, "I think the sands of time have run out on my coaching career at Iowa. I will no longer be a part of that program. I will not ask for an extension of my contract."

== Athletic director ==
After his public conflict with his athletic director, Nagel never took another head coaching job, but became an accomplished AD himself. He left Iowa in May 1971 to become the athletic director at Washington State of the Pacific-8 Conference.

In his five years at WSU, Nagel spearheaded the creation of the Cougar Club, coordinated fundraising, and served on the NCAA Football Rules Committee from 1973 to 1976. Among his hires in Pullman were long-time basketball coach George Raveling and football coach Jackie Sherrill. He moved on to the University of Hawaii in June 1976, and served as its director of athletics until 1983.

Nagel left Hawaii to become the executive vice president of the Los Angeles Rams in 1983. He left after just one year and returned to Hawaii in 1984 as vice president of public relations for the Bank of Hawaii, and held that position until 1989. He was then named as the executive director of the Hula Bowl and retired in 1995.

In June 2006, Nagel was inducted into the National Association of Collegiate Directors of Athletics (NACDA) Hall of Fame.

== Personal ==
Nagel and his wife Shirley (née Tanner) had five children and lived in retirement in San Antonio, Texas. He died at age 87 on January 15, 2015.

== Head coaching record ==
Year	Team	Overall	Conference	Standing	Bowl/playoffs	Coaches^{#}	AP^{°}
Utah Utes (Skyline Conference) (1958–1961)
1958	Utah	4–7	3–3	5th			
1959	Utah	5–5	3–2	4th			
1960	Utah	7–3	5–1	3rd			
1961	Utah	6–4	3–3	T–3rd			
Utah Utes (Western Athletic Conference) (1962–1965)
1962	Utah	4–5–1	1–2–1	6th			
1963	Utah	4–6	2–2	T–3rd			
1964	Utah	9–2	3–1	T–1st	W Liberty	14	
1965	Utah	3–7	1–3	5th			
Utah:		42–39–1	21–17–1				
Iowa Hawkeyes (Big Ten Conference) (1966–1970)
1966	Iowa	2–8	1–6	10th			
1967	Iowa	1–8–1	0–6–1	T–9th			
1968	Iowa	5–5	4–3	T–5th			
1969	Iowa	5–5	3–4	T–5th			
1970	Iowa	3–6–1	3–3–1	4th			
Iowa:		16–32–2	11–22–2				
Total:		58–71–3					
National championship Conference title Conference division title or championship game berth
^{#}Rankings from final Coaches Poll.; ^{°}Rankings from final AP Poll.
