= 1964 New Mexico Lobos football team =

American college football season

1964 New Mexico Lobos football

WAC co-champion
- Conference: Western Athletic Conference

Ranking
- Coaches: No. 16
- Record: 9–2 (3–1 WAC)
- Head coach: Bill Weeks (5th season)
- Home stadium: University Stadium

1964 Western Athletic Conference football standings
	Conf.					Overall
Team	W		L		T	W		L		T
New Mexico +	3	–	1	–	0	9	–	2	–	0
Utah +	3	–	1	–	0	9	–	2	–	0
Arizona +	3	–	1	–	0	6	–	3	–	1
Wyoming	2	–	2	–	0	6	–	2	–	2
Arizona State	0	–	2	–	0	8	–	2	–	0
BYU	0	–	4	–	0	3	–	6	–	1
+ – Conference co-champions

The 1964 New Mexico Lobos football team was an American football team that represented the University of New Mexico in the Western Athletic Conference (WAC) during the 1964 NCAA University Division football season. In their fifth season under head coach Bill Weeks, the Lobos compiled a 9–2 record (3–1 against WAC opponents), tied for the WAC championship, were ranked No. 16 in the final UPI Coaches poll, and outscored opponents, 185 to 190.

Fullback Chuck Kelly and defensive tackle Wayne Tvrdik were the team captains. The team's statistical leaders included quarterback Stan Quintana with 794 passing yards, Joe Harris with 582 rushing yards and 614 receiving yards, and Claude Ward with 42 points scored.

Three New Mexico players were selected by the United Press International (UPI) as first-team players on the 1964 All-WAC football team: Quintana; Tvrdik; and guard Jack Abendschan. The UPI also selected Quintana as the 1964 WAC Player of the Year, citing his versatility and outstanding play on both offense and defense. Quintana ranked third in the WAC with 1,249 yards of total offense, fourth with 794 passing yards, and fifth with 455 rushing yards (including an 80-yard run against Colorado State). He also set a WAC record for interception return yards (including a 93-yard return against Wyoming), and his average of 7.3 yard of total offense per play in 1964 remains a New Mexico school record.

Though New Mexico shared the WAC title with Arizona and Utah, neither of them made a bowl appearance due to fewer bowl games at the time. The Lobos defeated the Wildcats but lost to the Utes, which led to the three-way tie atop the WAC standings.

== Schedule ==
Date	Opponent	Site	Result	Attendance	Source
September 19	at Utah	Ute Stadium; Salt Lake City, UT	L 0–16	24,274	
September 26	Montana*	University Stadium; Albuquerque, NM	W 20–0	24,805	
October 2	at BYU	Cougar Stadium; Provo, UT	W 26–14	34,610	
October 10	Arizona	University Stadium; Albuquerque, NM (rivalry)	W 10–7	20,844	
October 17	Utah State*	University Stadium; Albuquerque, NM	L 3–14	28,537	
October 24	New Mexico State*	University Stadium; Albuquerque, NM (rivalry)	W 18–14	13,582	
October 31	at Wyoming	War Memorial Stadium; Laramie, WY	W 17–6	18,107	
November 7	at Texas Western*	Sun Bowl; El Paso, TX	W 20–12	15,038	
November 14	Colorado State*^{†}	University Stadium; Albuquerque, NM	W 42–0	24,732	
November 20	at Hawaii*	Honolulu Stadium; Honolulu, HI	W 20–0	6,000	
November 28	Kansas State*	University Stadium; Albuquerque, NM	W 9–7	20,443	
*Non-conference game; ^{†}Homecoming
