= Pokey Allen =

American football player and coach (1943–1996)

- Allen, c. 1990

Biographical details
- Born: January 23, 1943; Superior, Montana, U.S.
- Died: December 30, 1996 (aged 53); Missoula, Montana, U.S.
- Education: Missoula County (MT)

Playing career
- 1961–1964: Utah
- 1965–1967: BC Lions
- 1967: Edmonton Eskimos
- Positions: Quarterback, cornerback, defensive halfback

Coaching career (HC unless noted)
- 1968–1972: Simon Fraser (assistant)
- 1973–1976: Simon Fraser (co-HC)
- 1977–1979: Montana (DC/DB)
- 1980–1981: Eastern Washington (DC)
- 1982: California (DB)
- 1983–1984: Los Angeles Express (assistant)
- 1985: Portland Breakers (DC)
- 1986–1992: Portland State
- 1993–1996: Boise State

Head coaching record
- Overall: 87–41–2
- Tournaments: 10–5 (NCAA D-II playoffs); 3–1 (NCAA D-I-AA playoffs)

Accomplishments and honors

Championships
- 5 Western Football (1987–1989, 1991, 1992); 1 Big Sky (1994)

Ernest Duncan "Pokey" Allen Jr. (January 23, 1943 – December 30, 1996) was an American football player and coach in the United States and Canada. He played college football for the Utah Utes before going on to play professionally for the BC Lions and the Edmonton Eskimos of the Canadian Football League (CFL) in the 1960s.

Allen began a coaching career after retiring as a player in 1968. His early assistant and position coaching jobs included several NCAA football teams and the Los Angeles Express of the United States Football League. He was the head coach at Portland State University from 1986 to 1992 and at Boise State University from 1993 to 1996, compiling a career college football record of 87–41–2 (.677). Allen led Portland State to consecutive appearances in the Division II championship game in 1987 and 1988 and guided Boise State to the Division I-AA title game in 1994.

In 1994, Allen was diagnosed with rhabdomyosarcoma, a rare form of muscle cancer. He continued coaching until shortly before his death in 1996.

== Playing career ==
Born in Superior, Montana, Allen attended Missoula County High School in Missoula and was a high school athlete in football, basketball, and track. Allen primarily played quarterback in high school. He accepted a scholarship to play college football at the University of Utah in Salt Lake City under head coach Ray Nagel. Utah was a member of the Skyline Conference, and in 1962 became a charter member of the WAC.

As a freshman in 1961, Allen played as a quarterback and returned punts on the freshman team. By his sophomore year, Allen was primarily a defensive player, serving also as the third-string quarterback. As a quarterback and cornerback in his senior season in 1964, Allen and end/placekicker Roy Jefferson led the Redskins to a 9–2 record, including a 32–6 victory over favored West Virginia in the Liberty Bowl, played indoors in Atlantic City; Allen was named the game's most valuable player.

Allen played three seasons of professional football in the Canadian Football League with the BC Lions and Edmonton Eskimos, primarily as a defensive back. Through 38 total regular season games, he recorded eight interceptions and two fumble recoveries. While with the BC Lions from 1965 to 1967, Allen was also used sporadically as a punt returner, returning 79 punts for 412 yards. In 1967, Allen moved to the Eskimos, where he played only two games. He retired prior to the 1968 season.

== Early coaching career ==
Following his CFL playing career, Allen became an assistant coach in 1968 at Simon Fraser University in Burnaby, B.C., Canada. Five years later, he was named co-coach of the team along with Bob DeJulius. After nine years at Simon Fraser, Allen returned to the U.S. in 1977 as the defensive coordinator at Montana under head coach Gene Carlson, followed by other assistant coaching positions with Eastern Washington and California.

In 1983, Allen signed on as an assistant coach for the Los Angeles Express of the USFL, a newly formed professional league which played its games in the spring during the NFL offseason. Two years later, he moved to Portland, Oregon as defensive coordinator for the Portland Breakers.

== Portland State ==
Following the collapse of the USFL, Allen became the head coach of the Portland State Vikings in 1986. Allen coached the Vikings to their first playoff appearances, including back-to-back trips to the Division II finals in 1987 and 1988, though the team lost both games. He was named coach of the year in the Western Football Conference five times. The Vikings had a 63–26–2 record while Allen coached the team.

Allen was as much noted for his personality as his coaching. He took part in a humorous series of television commercials to sell tickets for Portland State games, with stunts such as dancing the Hokey Pokey, betting a month's salary on attendance at the game, allowing fans to vote on whether to pick heads or tails at the coin toss, and most famously, a series of commercials in which Allen promised to have a meteor, an elephant, or himself (shot out of a cannon) land in the backyard of anyone not buying Portland State season tickets.

== Boise State ==
In 1992, Allen's Division II Vikings visited Bronco Stadium in Boise in late October and soundly defeated the I-AA Broncos 52–26. After Boise State lost their next three games to close out the season, head coach Skip Hall promptly resigned, and Allen and his entire coaching staff were hired away from Portland State.

In his second year at Boise State in 1994, BSU began the season unranked. Allen led the Broncos to a 10–1 regular season and a Big Sky championship, the first since 1980, and a #3 ranking at the end of the regular season. As conference champions, the Broncos were included in the 16-team Division I-AA playoffs and advanced to the national finals. BSU lost 24–14 to Jim Tressel's Youngstown State Penguins at Huntington, West Virginia, and finished the season at 13–2.

Allen maintained his reputation for publicity stunts at Boise State. During the run to the 1994 national championship game, he challenged local supporters and promised to ride a horse in downtown Boise if Bronco Stadium was sold out for their annual rivalry game versus Idaho, who had won twelve straight games over the Broncos. The stadium was sold out, BSU won 27–24, and Allen kept his promise.

== Cancer and legacy ==
Bothered by shoulder pain for about a month, Allen had outpatient surgery in Boise for a biopsy three days prior to the 1994 championship game, and was diagnosed two days after the game with rhabdomyosarcoma, a rare form of muscle cancer. The tumor in his upper right arm was removed in March and he underwent extensive chemotherapy and a stem-cell transplant in July at the Fred Hutchinson Center in Seattle. He returned to coach the Broncos in 1995 while going through treatment, and the cancer was declared in remission in December 1995, but the doctors warned of likely recurrence. After finding a lump on his chest the following summer, cancer was found in both lungs and Allen took a medical leave of absence on August 6; several days later he underwent extensive surgery at the University of Washington Medical Center in Seattle.

Defensive coordinator Tom Mason filled in as interim head coach in 1996, the Broncos' first in the Big West Conference and Division I-A, and they stumbled to just one win in their first ten games. Allen returned for the final two games of the season, against New Mexico State and Idaho. His win at NMSU was his only Division I-A win, but a week later the Broncos were routed 64–19 by rival Idaho in Boise. Three weeks later, after additional tests revealed more tumors in his lungs, he resigned as head coach on December 11. While visiting family in Montana over the holidays, Allen fell and his condition worsened; he died at St. Patrick Hospital in Missoula at the age of 53. His memorial service was on New Year's Day at St. Anthony Catholic Church in Missoula.

Allen was inducted into the Oregon Sports Hall of Fame in 1998.

== Head coaching record ==
Year	Team	Overall	Conference	Standing	Bowl/playoffs	Coaches^{#}	AP^{°}
Portland State Vikings (Western Football Conference) (1986–1992)
1986	Portland State	6–5	4–2	T–2nd			
1987	Portland State	11–2–1	4–1–1	1st	L NCAA Division II Championship		3
1988	Portland State	11–3–1	6–0	1st	L NCAA Division II Championship		4
1989	Portland State	9–4	4–1	1st	L NCAA Division II Quarterfinal		14
1990	Portland State	6–5	2–3	T–3rd			
1991	Portland State	11–3	5–0	1st	L NCAA Division II Semifinal		8
1992	Portland State	9–4	4–1	1st	L NCAA Division II Semifinal		19
Portland State:		63–26–2	29–7–1				
Boise State Broncos (Big Sky Conference) (1993–1995)
1993	Boise State	3–8	1–6	7th			
1994	Boise State	13–2	6–1	1st	L NCAA Division I-AA Championship		3
1995	Boise State	7–4	4–3	T–2nd			21
Boise State Broncos (Big West Conference) (1996)
1996	Boise State	1–1 (Note: Defensive coordinator Tom Mason served as interim head coach for the first ten games of the season while Allen was on a leave of absence. Allen returned for the final two games.)	1–1	5th			
Boise State:		24–15	12–11				
Total:		87–41–2					
National championship Conference title Conference division title or championship game berth

== Personal life ==
Allen was born to Ernest Duncan Allen Sr. and Esther Allen. Allen Sr. was one of the first patrolmen in the Montana Highway Patrol as well as a veteran of both World War I and World War II. Allen had one daughter.
