= 1964 Arizona Wildcats football team =

American college football season

1964 Arizona Wildcats football

WAC co-champion
- Conference: Western Athletic Conference
- Record: 6–3–1 (3–1 WAC)
- Head coach: Jim LaRue (6th season)
- Captains: John Briscoe; Larry Fairholm
- Home stadium: Arizona Stadium

1964 Western Athletic Conference football standings
	Conf.					Overall
Team	W		L		T	W		L		T
New Mexico +	3	–	1	–	0	9	–	2	–	0
Utah +	3	–	1	–	0	9	–	2	–	0
Arizona +	3	–	1	–	0	6	–	3	–	1
Wyoming	2	–	2	–	0	6	–	2	–	2
Arizona State	0	–	2	–	0	8	–	2	–	0
BYU	0	–	4	–	0	3	–	6	–	1
+ – Conference co-champions

The 1964 Arizona Wildcats football team represented the University of Arizona in the Western Athletic Conference (WAC) during the 1964 NCAA University Division football season. In their sixth season under head coach Jim LaRue, the Wildcats compiled a 6–3–1 record (3–1 in WAC), finished in a three-way for the WAC championship, and outscored their opponents 147 to 76. Home games were played on campus at Arizona Stadium in Tucson, and the team captains were John Briscoe and Larry Fairholm.

Arizona shared the WAC title with both New Mexico and Utah. The combination of the head-to-head loss to the Lobos early in the season and not playing Utah contributed to the three-way tie, and prevented the Wildcats from making a bowl game appearance. After winning against Arizona State in the season finale, Arizona began a decade of futility against their rival, and not winning again until 1974.

Arizona's statistical leaders included Lou White with 419 passing yards, Floyd Hudlow with 402 rushing yards, and Rickie Harris with 391 receiving yards.

== Schedule ==
Date	Opponent	Site	Result	Attendance	Source
September 26	BYU	Arizona Stadium; Tucson, AZ	W 39–6	27,400	
October 3	Washington State*	Arizona Stadium; Tucson, AZ	W 28–12	29,400	
October 10	at New Mexico	University Stadium; Albuquerque, NM (rivalry)	L 7–10	20,844	
October 17	at Oregon*	Hayward Field; Eugene, OR	L 0–21	18,000	
October 24	Wyoming	Arizona Stadium; Tucson, AZ	W 15–7	26,500	
October 31	at Air Force*	Falcon Stadium; Colorado Springs, CO	L 0–7	32,325	
November 7	Idaho*	Arizona Stadium; Tucson, AZ	W 14–7	21,500	
November 14	at Texas Western*	Sun Bowl; El Paso, TX	W 14–0	8,355	
November 21	Iowa State*	Arizona Stadium; Tucson, AZ	T 0–0	24,000	
November 28	Arizona State	Arizona Stadium; Tucson, AZ (rivalry)	W 30–6	29,000	
*Non-conference game

== Coaching staff ==
- Ron Marciniak
- Ed Cavanaugh
- Jake Rowden
