= 1964 Utah Utes football team =

American college football season

1964 Utah Utes football

WAC co-champion

Liberty Bowl, W 32–6 vs. West Virginia
- Conference: Western Athletic Conference

Ranking
- Coaches: No. T–14
- Record: 9–2 (3–1 WAC)
- Head coach: Ray Nagel (7th season)
- Home stadium: Ute Stadium (30,000)

1964 Western Athletic Conference football standings
	Conf.					Overall
Team	W		L		T	W		L		T
New Mexico +	3	–	1	–	0	9	–	2	–	0
Utah +	3	–	1	–	0	9	–	2	–	0
Arizona +	3	–	1	–	0	6	–	3	–	1
Wyoming	2	–	2	–	0	6	–	2	–	2
Arizona State	0	–	2	–	0	8	–	2	–	0
BYU	0	–	4	–	0	3	–	6	–	1
+ – Conference co-champions

The 1964 Utah Utes football team, or also commonly known as the Utah Redskins, was an American football team that represented the University of Utah as a member of the Western Athletic Conference (WAC) during the 1964 NCAA University Division football season. In their seventh season under head coach Ray Nagel, the Utes compiled an overall record of 9–2 with a mark of 3–1 against conference opponents, sharing the WAC title with Arizona and New Mexico. Led by quarterback Pokey Allen, running back Ron Coleman, and receiver Roy Jefferson, Utah defeated West Virginia 32–6 in the Liberty Bowl, played indoors in at the Atlantic City Convention Hall in Atlantic City, New Jersey. Home games were played on campus at Ute Stadium in Salt Lake City.

== Schedule ==
Date	Opponent	Site	TV	Result	Attendance	Source
September 19	New Mexico	Ute Stadium; Salt Lake City, UT		W 16–0	24,274	
September 26	at Missouri*	Memorial Stadium; Columbia, MO		L 6–23	45,000	
October 3	Idaho*	Ute Stadium; Salt Lake City, UT		W 22–0	19,499	
October 10	at Wyoming	War Memorial Stadium; Laramie, WY		L 13–14	19,831	
October 17	at Colorado State*	Colorado Field; Fort Collins, CO		W 13–3	11,200	
October 24	Arizona State^{†}	Ute Stadium; Salt Lake City, UT		W 16–3	25,409	
October 31	at Texas Western*	Sun Bowl; El Paso, TX		W 41–0	10,779	
November 7	BYU	Ute Stadium; Salt Lake City, UT (rivalry)		W 47–13	29,422	
November 14	at California*	California Memorial Stadium; Berkeley, CA		W 14–0	32,951	
November 21	Utah State*	Ute Stadium; Salt Lake City, UT (rivalry)		W 14–6	24,622	
December 19	vs. West Virginia*	Atlantic City Convention Hall; Atlantic City, NJ (Liberty Bowl)	ABC	W 32–6	6,059	
*Non-conference game; ^{†}Homecoming

== NFL draft ==
Four players were selected in the 1965 NFL draft.

Player	Position	Round	Pick	NFL team
Roy Jefferson	Wide receiver	2	18	Pittsburgh Steelers
Greg Kent	Tackle	7	92	Detroit Lions
Frank Roy	Guard	7	96	St. Louis Cardinals
Frank Andruski	Running back	14	184	San Francisco 49ers
