= 1964 Liberty Bowl =

American college football game

- 6th Liberty Bowl
Utah Redskins	West Virginia Mountaineers
(8–2)	(7–3)
WAC	SoCon
32	6
Head coach: Ray Nagel	Head coach: Gene Corum
AP / Coaches; NR / 14
	1	2	3	4	Total
Utah	3	16	6	7	32
West Virginia	0	0	6	0	6
- Date: December 19, 1964
- Season: 1964
- Stadium: Atlantic City Convention Hall
- Location: Atlantic City, New Jersey
- MVP: Ernest "Pokey" Allen (QB, Utah)
- Referee: Gerald Hogan
- Attendance: 6,059

The 1964 Liberty Bowl was a college football bowl game played on December 19, 1964, at the Atlantic City Convention Hall (now known as Boardwalk Hall) in Atlantic City, New Jersey. It was the sixth edition of the Liberty Bowl, and featured the Utah Redskins and the West Virginia Mountaineers.

This was the first major bowl game ever played indoors and the first indoor American football game broadcast nationwide in the United States. It was played at a temperature of 60 °F (16 °C), in a venue that, earlier in the same year, had already hosted the Boardwalk Bowl (a small college bowl game), the Miss America pageant, the 1964 Democratic National Convention that nominated Lyndon B. Johnson for President, and one of The Beatles' largest concerts during their first American tour.

== Background ==
The venue had been shifted to Atlantic City after the bowl was played for its initial five years outdoors in Philadelphia Municipal Stadium (later John F. Kennedy Stadium), often in temperatures below freezing. The inaugural Liberty Bowl in 1959 saw Penn State beat Alabama by a score of 7–0 in front of 38,000 fans. But it was downhill from there, and fewer than 10,000 were in attendance to watch the 1963 edition between Mississippi State and NC State, with the organizers taking a loss of $40,000. The frigid temperatures at year's end in the Northeast led to the game being called the "Deep Freeze Bowl". Bud Dudley, organizer of the Liberty Bowl, was ready for a change and was receptive to an offer (including a $25,000 guarantee) from a group of Atlantic City businessmen who were trying to help revive the then-fading Jersey Shore resort.

The 1964 Liberty Bowl was the first major bowl game ever played indoors. Artificial turf was not in use yet, and the playing surface was a 4-inch-thick (10 cm) grass surface with two inches of burlap underneath it on top of concrete. Artificial lights were installed and kept running all day long to keep the grass growing. The organizers spent $16,000 on all of the field preparations for the game. To squeeze the game onto the floor of the convention hall, the end zones at each side of the field were shortened to eight yards in depth from the regulation ten.

In the 1964 postseason, the Liberty Bowl was one of just eight major bowl games. The American Broadcasting Company (ABC) agreed to broadcast the game nationally and brought Paul Christman, Curt Gowdy, and Jim McKay to announce the game, paying $95,000 for the rights to broadcast the first nationwide telecast of an indoor football game.

== Game summary ==
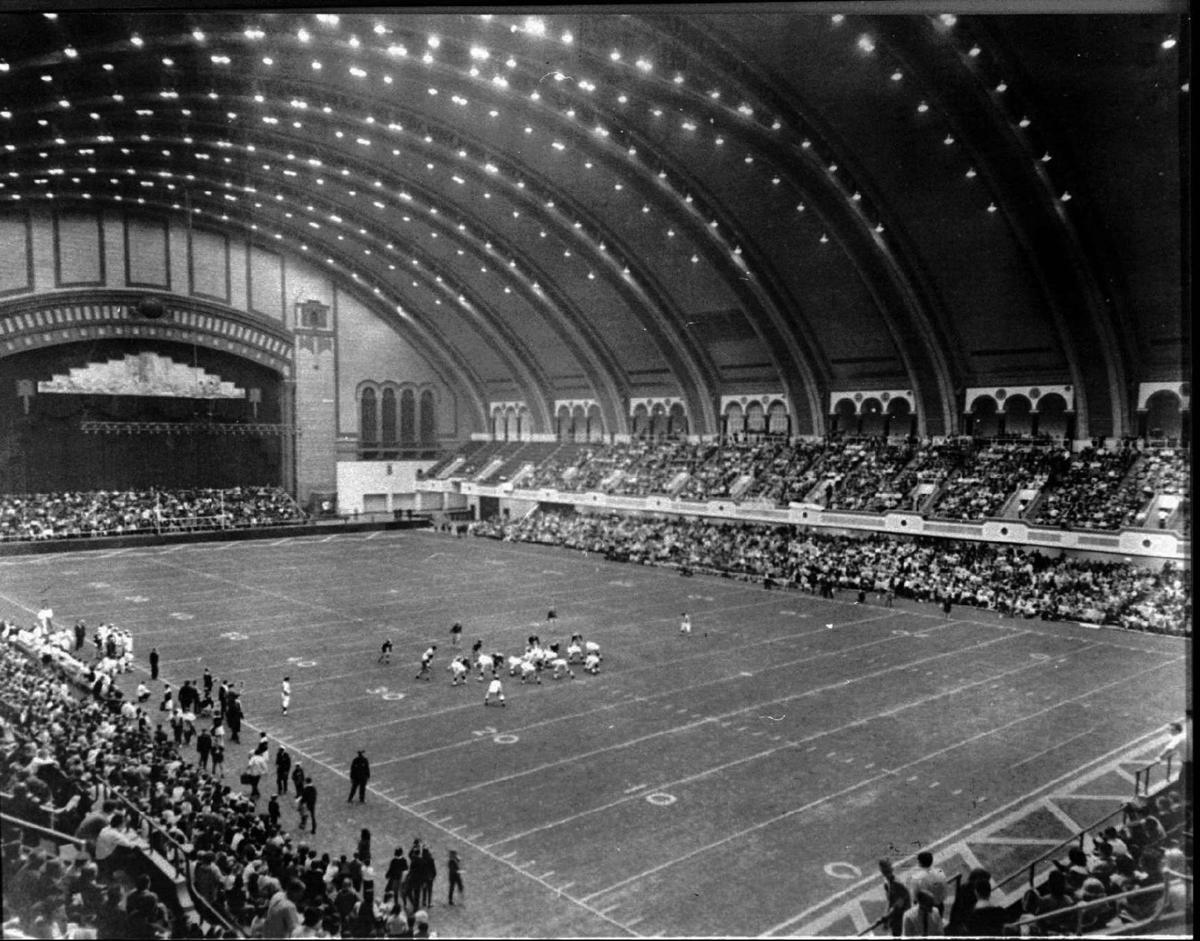
Liberty Bowl at the Atlantic City Convention Center in 1964

The Utah Redskins (8–2) faced the West Virginia Mountaineers (7–3). West Virginia's regular season record included a 28–27 upset over the Sugar Bowl-bound Syracuse Orangemen in their final regular game of the season. West Virginia featured running back Dick Leftridge and Utah's offense featured All-American Roy Jefferson. Utah used their speed and dominated West Virginia from start to finish and won 32–6. Utah Halfback Ron Coleman gained 154 yards on 15 carries, scoring a touchdown on a 53-yard run. Utah quarterback (and safety) Pokey Allen was named the game's outstanding player.

This was the last edition of the Liberty Bowl played in the Northeastern United States; it moved to Memphis, Tennessee, for the 1965 edition, where it has remained.

== Scoring summary ==
Scoring summary

Quarter	Time	Drive			Team	Scoring information	Score	
Quarter	Time	Plays	Yards	TOP	Team	Scoring information	Utah	WVU
1			50		Utah	29-yard field goal by Roy Jefferson	3	0
2			45		Utah	Pokey Allen 11-yard touchdown run, Roy Jefferson kick good	10	0
2					Utah	32-yard field goal by Roy Jefferson	13	0
2			68		Utah	Ron Coleman 53-yard touchdown run, 2-point pass failed	19	0
3			80		Utah	Andy Ireland 47-yard touchdown run, 2-point run failed	25	0
3	0:10		67		WVU	Milt Clegg 15-yard touchdown reception from Allen McCune, 2-point pass failed	25	6
4					Utah	Bill Morley 33-yard touchdown reception from Dick Groth, Jerry Pullman kick good	32	6
"TOP" = time of possession. For other American football terms, see Glossary of American football.							32	6
