= 1963 Idaho Vandals football team =

American college football season

1963 Idaho Vandals football
- Conference: Big Sky Conference
- Record: 5–4 (1–0 Big Sky)
- Head coach: Dee Andros (2nd season)
- Defensive coordinator: Steve Musseau (2nd season)
- Base defense: 5–2
- Captains: Don Matthews; Galen Rogers
- Home stadium: Neale Stadium

1963 Big Sky Conference football standings
	Conf.					Overall
Team	W		L		T	W		L		T
Idaho State $	3	–	1	–	0	5	–	3	–	0
Montana State	2	–	1	–	0	6	–	3	–	0
Weber State	1	–	2	–	0	6	–	3	–	0
Montana	0	–	3	–	0	1	–	9	–	0
Idaho *	1	–	0	–	0	5	–	4	–	0
$ – Conference champion; * – Insufficient number of games for conference championship

The 1963 Idaho Vandals football team represented the University of Idaho as a member of the newly-formed Big Sky Conference during the 1963 NCAA University Division football season. Led by second-year head coach Dee Andros, the Vandals compiled an overall record of 5–4 with a mark of 1–0 in conference play. Idaho was ineligible for the Big Sky championship because the team did not play a sufficient number of conference games. The Vandals played home games at Neale Stadium, on campus in Moscow, Idaho.

== Season ==
Led on the field by quarterbacks Gary Mires and Mike Monahan, Idaho compiled a 5–4 record for the program's first winning season in a quarter century, since 1938 under head coach Ted Bank. In between, Idaho had three seasons at an even .500, (1947, 1952, 1957). The victory over Fresno State was their first in a season opener in thirteen years. All five Vandal wins came in Idaho, played in three different regions of the state.

Although a slight favorite, the Vandals suffered a ninth straight loss in the Battle of the Palouse with neighbor Washington State, falling 14–10 at Rogers Field in Pullman on November 2. The difference was a fourth quarter Cougar touchdown on a kickoff return. The rivalry game with Montana for the Little Brown Stein was not played this year or the next.

This was the second season (1959) in which Idaho scheduled ten games, but the finale at Arizona State in Tempe on November 23 was canceled following the assassination of President Kennedy. Although many teams postponed their games for a week, ASU had its rivalry game scheduled for November 30 against Arizona, so the UI–ASU game was not played.

Idaho was a charter member of the new Big Sky Conference, but did not participate in football until 1965, and was an independent from 1959 through 1964. The only Big Sky opponent on the Vandals' schedule in 1963 was conference champion Idaho State, whom they shut out on the road in Pocatello; the remainder of Idaho's opponents were in the University Division.

Senior guard Don Matthews went on to a successful coaching career in the Canadian Football League; he was a head coach for over twenty seasons and won five of nine Grey Cup games.

== Schedule ==
Date	Time	Opponent	Site	Result	Attendance	Source
September 21	1:30 pm	Fresno State*	Neale Stadium; Moscow, ID	W 32–8	8,200	
September 28	1:00 pm	vs. Utah*	old Bronco Stadium; Boise, ID	W 10–9	10,000	
October 5		at Missouri*	Memorial Stadium; Columbia, MO	L 0–24	40,000	
October 12	1:30 pm	at Oregon*	Hayward Field; Eugene, OR	L 21–41	19,200	
October 19	1:30 pm	Pacific (CA)*^{†}	Neale Stadium; Moscow, ID	W 64–6	12,000	
October 26	1:30 pm	San Jose State*	Neale Stadium; Moscow, ID	W 28–12	8,700	
November 2	1:30 pm	at Washington State*	Rogers Field; Pullman, WA (Battle of the Palouse)	L 10–14	18,500	
November 9		at Arizona*	Arizona Stadium; Tucson, AZ	L 7–34	17,000	
November 16		at Idaho State	Spud Bowl; Pocatello, ID (rivalry)	W 14–0	6,500	
November 23		at Arizona State*	Sun Devil Stadium; Tempe AZ	Canceled		
*Non-conference game; ^{†}Homecoming; All times are in Pacific time

Final game was canceled following the assassination of President Kennedy.

== Coaching staff ==
- Dick Monroe, line
- John Easterbrook, offensive backs
- Bud Riley, freshmen

== All-Coast ==
No Vandals were selected to the All-Coast teams.
