= 1964 Idaho Vandals football team =

American college football season

1964 Idaho Vandals football
- Conference: Big Sky Conference
- Record: 4–6 (0–0 Big Sky)
- Head coach: Dee Andros (3rd season)
- Defensive coordinator: Steve Musseau (3rd season)
- Captains: Rich Naccarato; Dick Litzinger; Dick Strohmeyer
- Home stadium: Neale Stadium

1964 Big Sky Conference football standings
	Conf.					Overall
Team	W		L		T	W		L		T
Montana State $	3	–	0	–	0	7	–	4	–	0
Idaho State	2	–	1	–	0	6	–	3	–	0
Montana	1	–	2	–	0	3	–	6	–	0
Weber State	0	–	3	–	0	2	–	6	–	0
Idaho *	0	–	0	–	0	4	–	6	–	0
$ – Conference champion; * – Insufficient number of games for conference championship

The 1964 Idaho Vandals football team represented the University of Idaho as a member of the Big Sky Conference during the 1964 NCAA University Division football season. Led Dee Andros in his third and final season as head coach, the Vandals compiled an overall record of 4–6 and did not play any games against conference opponents. Home games were played on campus at Neale Stadium in Moscow, with one home game in Boise at old Bronco Stadium at Boise Junior College.

Led on the field by quarterback Mike Monahan and sophomore fullback Ray McDonald, the Vandals won 28–13 in the Battle of the Palouse with neighbor Washington State, the first win in a decade, and the last in Idaho. The Cougars were led by first-year head coach Bert Clark, a former teammate of Andros at Oklahoma. The Vandals split the final four games to finish at 4–6.

Although Idaho was a charter member of the new Big Sky Conference, the Vandals did not participate fully in football until 1965. They did not play any Big Sky teams in 1964 and all ten opponents were in the University Division; only two games were played on campus in Moscow, the latter was the win over neighboring WSU on October 24.

Although the Vandals finished with a losing record, they played the four Arizona and Oregon schools close, allowing less than 15 points to each. After the season in early February, Andros left for Oregon State, where he coached for eleven seasons and then became athletic director. Defensive coach Steve Musseau succeeded him as head coach at Idaho.

== Schedule ==
Date	Time	Opponent	Site	Result	Attendance	Source
September 19	7:00 pm	at San Jose State*	Spartan Stadium; San Jose, CA	W 3–0	16,485–17,000	
September 26	11:30 am	at Iowa*	Iowa Stadium; Iowa City, IA	L 24–34	43,300	
October 3	7:15 pm	at Utah*	Ute Stadium; Salt Lake City, UT	L 0–22	19,499	
October 10	1:30 pm	Oregon*^{†}	Neale Stadium; Moscow, ID	L 8–14	11,000	
October 17	1:30 pm	at Oregon State*	Parker Stadium; Corvallis, OR	L 7–10	13,527	
October 24	1:30 pm	Washington State*	Neale Stadium; Moscow, ID (Battle of the Palouse)	W 28–13	18,600	
October 31	8:00 pm	at Pacific (CA)*	Pacific Memorial Stadium; Stockton, CA	W 40–0	7,500	
November 7	1:30 pm	at Arizona*	Arizona Stadium; Tucson, AZ	L 7–14	21,500	
November 14	12:30 pm	Utah State*	old Bronco Stadium; Boise, ID	W 27–22	10,500	
November 21	7:00 pm	at Arizona State*	Sun Devil Stadium; Tempe, AZ	L 0–14	22,613	
*Non-conference game; ^{†}Homecoming; All times are in Pacific time

== Roster ==
1964 Idaho Vandals football team roster
Players
Coaches
Offense

Pos.	#	Name	Class
QB	10	John Foruria	So
QB, P	16	Joe Rodriguez	So
QB	18	Mike Monahan	Sr
WB	22	Joe McCollum	So
HB	27	Bill Scott	Jr
FB	32	Ray McDonald	So
FB	34	Mickey Rice	Sr
FB	36	Dale Meyer	Sr
FB	38	Charley Jenkins	Jr
HB	40	Tom Morris	Sr
HB	42	Rich Naccarato (C)	Sr
HB	44	Butch Slaughter	So
C	50	Bob Skuse	So
C	51	Steve Buratto	Jr
G	63	Jack Bryant	Jr
RG	65	Dave Triplett	Jr
LG	66	Ron Porter	So
LG	67	Bob Ruby	Sr
OL	70	Gary Fitzpatrick	So
LT	75	Dick Arndt	So
RT	79	Joe Dobson	Jr
OL	82	Bill Bufton	So
WR	86	Vern Leyde	Sr
WR	88	Joe Chapman	Jr
TE	89	John Whitney	Jr

Defense

Pos.	#	Name	Class
CB, QB	11	Jerry Ahlin	So
CB, QB	20	Larry Strohmeyer (C)	Sr
S	24	Mike Whiles	Sr
DB	43	John Shelt	So
DB	46	Byron Strickland	So
LB	52	Al Busby	So
LB	55	Dick Litzinger (C)	Sr
DT	60	John Daniel	So
LB, PK	61	Jerry Campbell	Jr
LB	63	LaVerle Pratt	Jr
DT	71	Stan Buratto	Sr
MG	72	John Boisen	Jr
DL	74	Vic Mann	So
DE	76	Ray Miller	So
DE	80	Max Leetzow	Sr
DB	83	Bob Bassett	Jr
DB, PK	85	Tim Lavens	So

Special teams

Pos.	#	Name	Class
P	16	Joe Rodriguez	So
P	34	Mickey Rice	Sr
PK	61	Jerry Campbell	Jr
PK	85	Tim Lavens	So

Head coach

- Dee Andros (3rd year)

Coordinators/assistant coaches

- Steve Musseau (defense)
- Dick Monroe (line)
- John Easterbrook (backs)
- Bud Riley (freshmen)
- Don Matthews (GA)

Legend

- (C) Team captain
- (S) Suspended
- (I) Ineligible
- Injured
- Redshirt

== NFL draft ==
One senior was selected in the 1965 NFL draft, which lasted 20 rounds (280 selections).

Player	Position	Round	Overall	Franchise
Max Leetzow	DE	14th	191	Minnesota Vikings

- Selected in the fifth round of the AFL draft (35th overall), Leetzow played two seasons with the Denver Broncos.

Four juniors were selected in the 1966 NFL draft, which lasted 20 rounds (305 selections).

Player	Position	Round	Overall	Franchise
Dick Arndt	DT	5th	77	Los Angeles Rams
Ray Miller	DE	7th	108	Green Bay Packers
LaVerle Pratt	LB	14th	210	St. Louis Cardinals
Joe Dobson	T	15th	218	Pittsburgh Steelers

Four sophomores were selected in the 1967 NFL/AFL draft, the first common draft, which lasted 17 rounds (445 selections).

Player	Position	Round	Overall	Franchise
Ray McDonald	RB	1st	13	Washington Redskins
Ron Porter	LB	5th	126	Baltimore Colts
John Foruria	QB	8th	192	Pittsburgh Steelers
Tim Lavens	TE	9th	212	New Orleans Saints
