= List of Weber State Wildcats football seasons =

The following is a list of Weber State Wildcats football seasons.

== Seasons ==
Year	Team	Overall	Conference	Standing	Bowl/playoffs	Coaches^{#}	AP^{°}
Wally Nalder (NCAA College Division independent) (1962–1964)
1962	Weber State	5–4					
Wally Nalder (Big Sky Conference) (1963–1964)
1963	Weber State	6–3	1–2	4th			
1964	Weber State	2–6	0–3	4th			
Sark Arslanian (Big Sky Conference) (1965–1972)
1965	Weber State	8–1	3–1	T–1st			
1966	Weber State	6–3	2–2	3rd			
1967	Weber State	6–4	2–2	T–2nd			
1968	Weber State	7–2	3–1	T–1st			
1969	Weber State	6–4	3–1	2nd			
1970	Weber State	5–5–1	3–3	T–3rd			
1971	Weber State	7–2–1	3–2–1	4th			
1972	Weber State	5–5	2–4	6th			
Dick Gwinn (Big Sky Conference) (1973–1976)
1973	Weber State	3–8	2–4	T–4th			
1974	Weber State	4–7	1–5	7th			
1975	Weber State	1–9–1	1–4–1	6th			
1976	Weber State	2–9	1–5	6th			
Pete Riehlman (Big Sky Conference) (1977–1980)
1977	Weber State	4–6	2–4	T–4th			
1978	Weber State	4–7	2–4	T–5th			
1979	Weber State	3–8	3–4	T–4th			
1980	Weber State	4–7	4–4	T–4th			
Mike Price (Big Sky Conference) (1981–1988)
1981	Weber State	7–4	4–3	T–4th			
1982	Weber State	4–7	2–5	7th			
1983	Weber State	6–5	4–3	T–5th			
1984	Weber State	5–6	3–4	6th			
1985	Weber State	6–5	4–3	4th			
1986	Weber State	3–8	2–5	T–6th			
1987	Weber State	10–3	6–1	2nd	L NCAA Division I–AA Quarterfinal		10
1988	Weber State	5–6	3–4	T–4th			
Dave Arslanian (Big Sky Conference) (1989–1987)
1989	Weber State	3–8	1–7	9th			
1990	Weber State	5–6	3–5	5th			
1991	Weber State	8–4	6–2	5th	L NCAA Division I–AA First Round		15
1992	Weber State	6–5	4–3	T–3rd			
1993	Weber State	7–4	3–4	T–5th			
1994	Weber State	5–6	2–5	T–6th			
1995	Weber State	6–5	4–3	T–2nd			
1996	Weber State	7–4	4–3	T–3rd			
1997	Weber State	6–5	4–4	T–4th			
Jerry Graybeal (Big Sky Conference) (1998–2004)
1998	Weber State	6–5	4–4	T–4th			
1999	Weber State	3–8	3–5	T–5th			
2000	Weber State	7–4	5–3	T–2nd			18
2001	Weber State	3–8	2–5	6th			
2002	Weber State	3–8	1–6	8th			
2003	Weber State	8–4	4–3	T–4th			
2004	Weber State	1–10	1–6	8th			
Ron McBride (Big Sky Conference) (2005–2010)
2005	Weber State	6–5	4–3	T–4th			
2006	Weber State	4–7	3–5	T–6th			
2007	Weber State	5–6	4–4	5th			
2008	Weber State	10–4	7–1	1st	L NCAA Division I Quarterfinal	9	7
2009	Weber State	7–5	6–2	2nd	L NCAA Division I First Round	17	17
2010	Weber State	6–5	5–3	T–3rd			
2011	Weber State	5–6	5–3	T–3rd			
Jody Sears (Big Sky Conference) (2012–2013)
2012	Weber State	2–9	2–6	T–11th			
2013	Weber State	2–10	1–7	T–11th			
Jay Hill (Big Sky Conference) (2014–2022)
2014	Weber State	2–10	2–6	T–10th			
2015	Weber State	6–5	5–3	T–4th			
2016	Weber State	7–5	6–2	3rd	L NCAA Division I First Round	25	24
2017	Weber State	11–3	7–1	T–1st	L NCAA Division I Quarterfinal	5	5
2018	Weber State	10–3	7–1	T–1st	L NCAA Division I Quarterfinal	6	6
2019	Weber State	11–4	7–1	T–1st	L NCAA Division I Semifinal	3	3
2020	Weber State	5–1	5–0	1st	L NCAA Division I First Round	8	9
2021	Weber State	6–5	5–3	T–5th			
2022	Weber State	10–3	6–2	T–3rd	L NCAA Division I Second Round	9	9
Mickey Mental (Big Sky Conference) (2023–present)
2023	Weber State	6–5	4–4	T–6th			
2024	Weber State	4–8	3–5	T–6th			
Total:							
National championship Conference title Conference division title or championship game berth
^{†}Indicates Bowl Coalition, Bowl Alliance, BCS, or CFP / New Years' Six bowl.; ^{#}Rankings from final Coaches Poll.
