= 1963 BYU Cougars football team =

American college football season

1963 BYU Cougars football
- Conference: Western Athletic Conference
- Record: 2–8 (0–4 WAC)
- Head coach: Hal Mitchell (3rd season)
- Home stadium: Cougar Stadium

1963 Western Athletic Conference football standings
	Conf.					Overall
Team	W		L		T	W		L		T
Arizona State *	3	–	0	–	0	8	–	1	–	0
New Mexico $	3	–	1	–	0	6	–	4	–	0
Arizona	2	–	2	–	0	5	–	5	–	0
Utah	2	–	2	–	0	4	–	6	–	0
Wyoming	2	–	3	–	0	6	–	4	–	0
BYU	0	–	4	–	0	2	–	8	–	0
$ – Conference champion; * – Ineligible for conference title due to playing fewer than qualifying number of games

The 1963 BYU Cougars football team represented Brigham Young University (BYU) as a member of the Western Athletic Conference (WAC) during the 1963 NCAA University Division football season. In their third and final season under head coach Hal Mitchell, the Cougars compiled an overall record of 2–8 with a mark of 0–4 against conference opponents, finished last out of sixth place in the WAC, and were outscored by a combined total of 222 to 91.

The team's statistical leaders included Phil Brady with 318 rushing yards and 448 yards of total offense, Ron Stewart with 160 passing yards, Bruce Smith with 178 receiving yards, and Frank Baker with 23 points scored.

== Schedule ==
Date	Time	Opponent	Site	Result	Attendance	Source
September 21		at Kansas State*	Memorial Stadium; Manhattan, KS	L 7–24	11,000	
September 28	8:00 p.m.	at Arizona	Arizona Stadium; Tucson, AZ	L 7–33		
October 5	8:00 p.m.	Montana*	Cougar Stadium; Provo, UT	W 27–0		
October 12		at Utah	Ute Stadium; Salt Lake City, UT	L 6–15	25,494	
October 19		at Wyoming	War Memorial Stadium; Laramie, WY	L 14–41	15,641	
November 2		Utah State*^{†}	Cougar Stadium; Provo, UT	L 0–26	13,343	
November 9		at George Washington*	District of Columbia Stadium; Washington, DC	L 6–23	7,000	
November 16		at Pacific (CA)*	Pacific Memorial Stadium; Stockton, CA	L 0–14	4,700–6,000	
November 23		Colorado State*	Cougar Stadium; Provo, UT	W 24–20	4,000	
November 30		at New Mexico	University Stadium; Albuquerque, NM	L 0–26	14,851	
*Non-conference game; ^{†}Homecoming; All times are in Mountain time
