= 1965 Idaho Vandals football team =

American college football season

1965 Idaho Vandals football

Big Sky co-champion
- Conference: Big Sky Conference
- Record: 5–5 (3–1 Big Sky)
- Head coach: Steve Musseau (1st season)
- Captains: Steve Buratto; Joe Dobson
- Home stadium: Neale Stadium

1965 Big Sky Conference football standings
| | Conf. | | | | | Overall |
| Team | W | | L | | T | W | | L | | T |
|---|---|---|---|---|---|---|---|---|---|---|
| Weber State + | 3 | – | 1 | – | 0 | 8 | – | 1 | – | 0 |
| Idaho + | 3 | – | 1 | – | 0 | 5 | – | 5 | – | 0 |
| Montana | 2 | – | 2 | – | 0 | 4 | – | 6 | – | 0 |
| Idaho State | 1 | – | 3 | – | 0 | 3 | – | 5 | – | 1 |
| Montana State | 1 | – | 3 | – | 0 | 3 | – | 7 | – | 0 |
+ – Conference co-champions

The 1965 Idaho Vandals football team represented the University of Idaho in the 1965 NCAA University Division football season. The Vandals were led by first-year head coach Steve Musseau and played in the Big Sky Conference for the first time; they played the previous six seasons as an independent in the NCAA University Division. Home games were played on campus at Neale Stadium in Moscow, with one home game in Boise at old Bronco Stadium at Boise Junior College.

Musseau was previously the defensive coach and was promoted after the February departure of Dee Andros for Oregon State.

Led on the field by quarterback John Foruria and fullback Ray McDonald, both juniors, the Vandals were 5–5 overall and 3–1 in conference play. Idaho won the Battle of the Palouse with neighbor Washington State for the second straight year, this time by a score of 17–13 at Rogers Field in Pullman. It was the first time Idaho logged consecutive wins over the Cougars in forty years. The Vandals lost close games to the other three Northwest teams of the AAWU (Pac-8).

The other two quarterbacks were Jerry Ahlin and Joe Rodriguez, who both started games in 1965.

== Schedule ==
| Date | Time | Opponent | Site | Result | Attendance | Source |
|---|---|---|---|---|---|---|
| September 18 | 1:30 pm | at Washington* | Husky Stadium; Seattle, WA | L 9–14 | 54,500–54,682 | |
| September 25 | 1:30 pm | San Jose State* | Neale Stadium; Moscow, ID | W 17–7 | 10,500 | |
| October 2 | 1:30 pm | at Washington State* | Rogers Field; Pullman, WA (rivalry) | W 17–13 | 22,600 | |
| October 9 | 12:30 pm | at Utah State* | old Romney Stadium; Logan, UT | L 19–30 | 13,732 | |
| October 16 | 12:30 pm | vs. Oregon State* | old Bronco Stadium; Boise, ID | L 14–16 | 13,000 | |
| October 23 | 12:30 pm | at Montana | Dornblaser Field; Missoula, MT (rivalry) | W 35–7 | 7,100 | |
| October 30 | 1:30 pm | at Oregon* | Hayward Field; Eugene, OR | L 14–17 | 15,500 | |
| November 6 | 12:30 pm | at Weber State | Wildcat Stadium; Ogden, UT | L 7–14 | 8,029 | |
| November 13 | 1:30 pm | Idaho State^{†} | Neale Stadium; Moscow, ID | W 15–7 | 12,250 | |
| November 20 | 1:30 pm | Montana State | Neale Stadium; Moscow, ID | W 54–0 | 3,500 | |
*Non-conference game; ^{†}Homecoming; All times are in Pacific time

== Roster ==
1965 Idaho Vandals football team roster
Players
Coaches
Offense

| Pos. | # | Name | Class |
|---|---|---|---|
| QB | 10 | John Foruria | Jr |
| RB | 14 | Mike Woolrich | So |
| QB, P | 16 | Joe Rodriguez | Jr |
| QB | 18 | Paul Gentle | So |
| RB | 21 | Pat Daily | Sr |
| WB | 22 | Joe McCollum | Jr |
| FB | 32 | Ray McDonald | Jr |
| FB | 38 | Charley Jenkins | Sr |
| HB | 40 | Tim Lavens | Jr |
| OL | 43 | Karl Kleinkopf | So |
| HB | 44 | Butch Slaughter | Jr |
| C | 50 | Mike Walsh |
| C | 51 | Steve Buratto (C) | Sr |
| C | 55 | Bob Skuse | Jr |
| G | 62 | Jack Bryant | Sr |
| RG | 65 | Dave Triplett | Sr |
| LG | 67 | Steve Ulrich | So |
| LT | 70 | Gary Fitzpatrick | Jr |
| OL | 72 | Brian Evans | So |
| RT | 79 | Joe Dobson (C) | Sr |
| WR | 81 | Rich Toney | So |
| OL | 82 | Bill Bufton | Jr |
| E | 86 | Larry Santschi | So |
| WR | 88 | Joe Chapman | Sr |
| TE | 89 | John Whitney | Sr |

Defense

| Pos. | # | Name | Class |
|---|---|---|---|
| DE, QB | 11 | Jerry Ahlin | Jr |
| S | 20 | Pat Davidson | So |
| DB | 24 | Byron Strickland | So |
| DB | 27 | Bill Scott | Sr |
| DB | 34 | John Shelt | So |
| DB, PK | 36 | Darrell Danielson | So |
| DB | 42 | John Ahlin |
| DB | 45 | Doug Bishop |
| DT | 52 | Al Busby | Jr |
| LB, PK | 61 | Jerry Campbell | Sr |
| LB | 63 | LaVerle Pratt | Jr |
| LB | 66 | Ron Porter | Jr |
| DT | 60 | John Daniel | Jr |
| MG | 72 | John Boisen | Sr |
| DL | 74 | Vic Mann | So |
| DT | 75 | Dick Arndt | Jr |
| DE, KR | 80 | Ray Miller | Jr |
| DB | 83 | Bob Bassett | Sr |
| DE | 84 | Jim Thiemans | So |
| DE | 85 | Tom Stephens | Jr |

Special teams

| Pos. | # | Name | Class |
|---|---|---|---|
| P | 16 | Joe Rodriguez | Jr |
| PK | 36 | Darrell Danielson | So |
| PK | 61 | Jerry Campbell | Sr |
| KR | 80 | Ray Miller | Jr |

Head coach

- Steve Musseau (1st year)

Coordinators/assistant coaches

- Walt Anderson (OL)
- Al Daniels (OB)
- Jack Jacobsen (DB)
- John G. Smith (DL)

Legend

- (C) Team captain
- (S) Suspended
- (I) Ineligible
- Injured
- Redshirt

== All-conference ==
Seven Vandals were selected to the all-conference team: fullback Ray McDonald, guard Dave Triplett, center Steve Buratto, defensive end Tom Stephens, defensive tackle Dick Arndt, linebacker Jerry Campbell, and defensive back Bill Scott.

On the second team were tackle Joe Dobson, guard Steve Ulrich, running back Tim Lavens, defensive end Ray Miller, middle guard John Boisen, linebacker LaVerle Pratt, and defensive back Jerry Ahlin. Honorable mention were defensive tackle John Daniel, defensive back Byron Strickland, tight end John Whitney, wide receivers Joe Chapman and Rich Toney, and tackle Gary Fitzpatrick.

McDonald was a second-team AP All-American.

== NFL draft ==
Four Vandals were selected in the 1966 NFL draft, which lasted 20 rounds (305 selections).

| Player | Position | Round | Overall | Franchise |
|---|---|---|---|---|
| Dick Arndt | T | 5th | 77 | Los Angeles Rams |
| Ray Miller | DE | 7th | 108 | Green Bay Packers |
| LaVerle Pratt | LB | 14th | 210 | St. Louis Cardinals |
| Joe Dobson | T | 15th | 218 | Pittsburgh Steelers |

- The first three were futures picks and played in the 1966 season for Idaho.

Four Vandal juniors were selected in the 1967 NFL/AFL draft, the first common draft, which lasted 17 rounds (445 selections).

| Player | Position | Round | Overall | Franchise |
|---|---|---|---|---|
| Ray McDonald | RB | 1st | 13 | Washington Redskins |
| Ron Porter | LB | 5th | 126 | Baltimore Colts |
| John Foruria | QB | 8th | 192 | Pittsburgh Steelers |
| Tim Lavens | TE | 9th | 212 | New Orleans Saints |
