= Yuba City High School =

Public school in Yuba City, California

Location
- 850 B Street; Yuba City, California
- Coordinates: 39.1298°N 121.6228°W

Information
- Type: Public
- School district: Yuba City Unified School District
- Principal: Cylas Olsen
- Teaching staff: 89.46 (FTE)
- Grades: 9–12
- Enrollment: 1,818 (2023-2024)
- Student to teacher ratio: 20.32
- Colors: Brown and gold
- Mascot: Honker
- Elevation: 55 ft (17 m) AMSL
- Website: ychs.ycusd.k12.ca.us

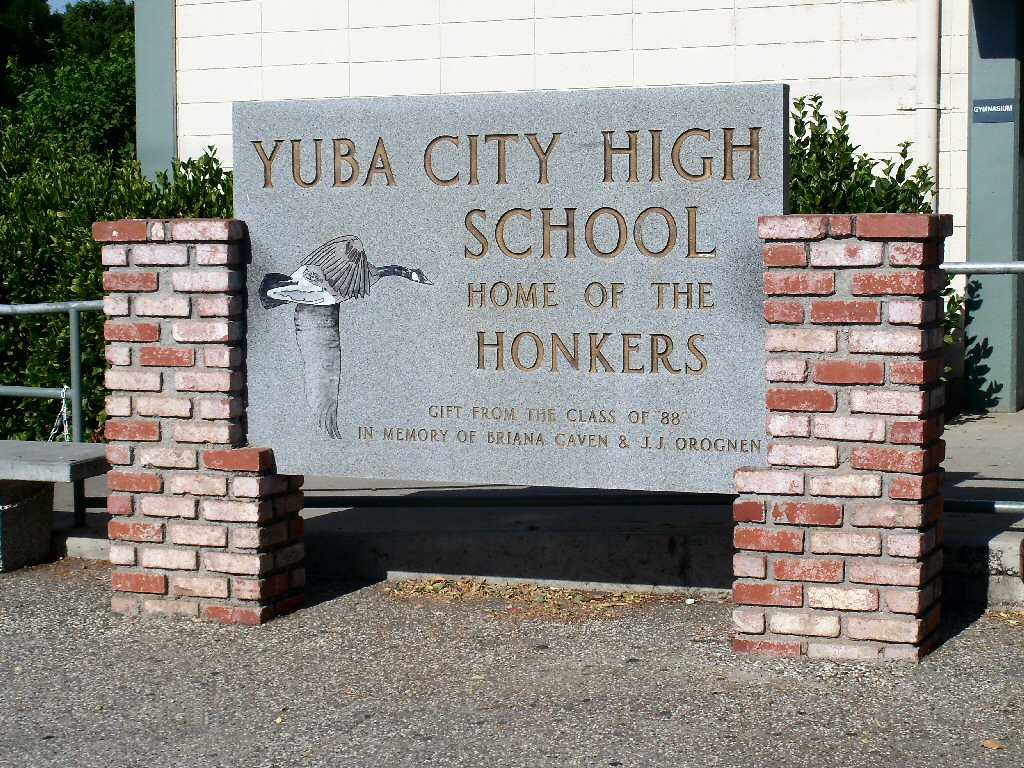
Yuba City High School is home of the Honkers

Yuba City High School is a public secondary school in Yuba City, California. It had roughly 3,000 students before River Valley High School opened in 2005. The school colors are brown and gold. Its mascot is the "Honker", a nickname for Canada geese.

== Athletics ==
Yuba City High School's athletic program used to compete in Division I of the Sac-Joaquin Section as a member of the Sierra Foothill League (until 1970), North Metro League (1970–76), Delta League (1976–1998, 2000–02), Capital Athletic League (1998–2000) and Metro Conference (2002–06). However, with the opening of River Valley High School, Yuba City's enrollment split in half and the Honkers moved to the Division III Tri-County Conference in fall 2006. Yuba City began competing in the Capital Valley Conference beginning in fall 2018.

Fall sports
American football, girls' tennis, girls' volleyball, girls' field hockey, cross country, girls' golf

Winter sports
Boys' basketball, girls' basketball, wrestling, boys' soccer, girls' soccer

Spring sports
Boys' baseball, boys' golf, boys' tennis, softball, swimming, diving, track & field, competitive stunt cheer

=== Mel Good ===
Every December, Yuba City High School hosts a basketball tournament called the Mel Good Holiday Classic, which is one of the biggest tournaments in Northern California. Teams from all over Northern California come to the school and are hosted by YCHS students.

== Music ==
Yuba City High School has a marching and concert band, full orchestra and chorus. The Yuba City High School marching band was renamed the "Brown and Gold Brigade" in 2009. After school, students are invited to participate in Pep Band, Jazz Band and Winter Percussion.

== Yuba City High School bus tragedy ==
In the late morning on May 21, 1976, a bus with the school's choir veered off the Marina Vista/Martinez Exit off-ramp from southbound Highway 680 (now Exit 56 of Interstate 680), and fell approximately 30 feet (9 m), landing on its roof and collapsing inwards. One teacher and 28 students died, leaving 24 survivors out of 52 passengers on the bus.

== Notable alumni ==
- Cam Eden - MLB outfielder for the Toronto Blue Jays
- Chris Petersen – American football coach of Washington Huskies, two-time Paul "Bear" Bryant Award winner coaching Boise State; class of 1983
- Ron Porter - NFL linebacker for seven seasons, played for Colts, Eagles and Vikings; class of 1963; played in Super Bowl III
- Darryl Scott – MLB pitcher for California Angels and minor-league pitching coordinator for Colorado Rockies; class of 1986.
- Max Stassi – MLB catcher for Los Angeles Angels; class of 2009
