= 1963 Arizona State Sun Devils football team =

American college football season

1963 Arizona State Sun Devils football
- Conference: Western Athletic Conference

Ranking
- Coaches: No. 13
- Record: 8–1 (3–0 WAC)
- Head coach: Frank Kush (6th season)
- Home stadium: Sun Devil Stadium

1963 Western Athletic Conference football standings
	Conf.					Overall
Team	W		L		T	W		L		T
Arizona State *	3	–	0	–	0	8	–	1	–	0
New Mexico $	3	–	1	–	0	6	–	4	–	0
Arizona	2	–	2	–	0	5	–	5	–	0
Utah	2	–	2	–	0	4	–	6	–	0
Wyoming	2	–	3	–	0	6	–	4	–	0
BYU	0	–	4	–	0	2	–	8	–	0
$ – Conference champion; * – Ineligible for conference title due to playing fewer than qualifying number of games

The 1963 Arizona State Sun Devils football team was an American football team that represented Arizona State University in the Western Athletic Conference (WAC) during the 1963 NCAA University Division football season. In their sixth season under head coach Frank Kush, the Sun Devils compiled an 8–1 record (3–0 against WAC opponents), and outscored their opponents by a combined total of 249 to 122.

The team's statistical leaders included John Torok with 600 passing yards, Tony Lorick with 805 rushing yards, and Herman Harrison with 371 receiving yards.

Gene Felker, Bill Kajikawa, Paul Kemp, Jack Stovall, and Dick Tamburo were assistant coaches. The Sun Devils finished 5–1 at home and 3–0 on the road. Home games were played at Sun Devil Stadium in Tempe, Arizona.

== Schedule ==
Date	Opponent	Site	Result	Attendance	Source
September 21	Wichita*	Sun Devil Stadium; Tempe, AZ	L 13–33	31,592	
September 28	New Mexico State*	Sun Devil Stadium; Tempe, AZ	W 14–13	26,882	
October 5	at Colorado State*	Colorado Field; Fort Collins, CO	W 50–7	12,000	
October 12	West Texas State*	Sun Devil Stadium; Tempe, AZ	W 24–16	28,815	
October 19	at Texas Western*	Sun Bowl; El Paso, TX	W 27–0	13,231	
November 2	Utah	Sun Devil Stadium; Tempe, AZ	W 30–22	28,549	
November 9	at San Jose State*	Spartan Stadium; San Jose, CA	W 21–19	21,000	
November 16	Wyoming	Sun Devil Stadium; Tempe, AZ	W 35–6	30,734	
November 23	Idaho	Sun Devil Stadium; Tempe, AZ	Canceled		
November 30	Arizona	Sun Devil Stadium; Tempe, AZ (rivalry)	W 35–6	41,140	
*Non-conference game

The game with Idaho on November 23 was canceled following the assassination of President Kennedy.

== Game summaries ==
On September 21, in the season opener in Tempe, Arizona State suffered a 33–13 home loss to Wichita State.

On September 28, the Sun Devils bounced back with a 14–13 home victory over New Mexico State.

ASU delivered an impressive 50–7 road win against Colorado State on October 5.

On October 12, the Devils prevailed for a 24–16 home victory over West Texas State.

Arizona State recorded a 27–0 road shutout win against Texas-El Paso on October 19.

Following a bye week, the Sun Devils defeated Utah 30–22 at Sun Devil Stadium on November 2.

On November 9, ASU outlasted San Jose State for a 21–19 road win.

The Devils beat Wyoming, 35–6, in Tempe on November 16.

Arizona State's home game against Idaho, scheduled November 23, was canceled out of respect for Pres. John F. Kennedy who was assassinated one day earlier.

In the Arizona–Arizona State football rivalry game, the Sun Devils closed their season with a 35–6 home victory over Arizona on November 30.

== Roster ==
Arizona State's usual offensive lineup included wide receiver Alonzo Hill, left tackle Frank Mitacek, left guard Bob Kec, center Chris Stetzar, right guard Joe Kush, right tackle/punter John Seedborg, tight end Herman Harrison, quarterback John Jacobs, halfback Gene Foster, fullback Tony Lorick, and wingback Charley Taylor. Rick Davis, John Folmer, Ben Hawkins, Darrell Hoover, Chuck Kolb, Bob Lueck, Jim Murphy, Joe Pico, Jerry Smith, and John Torok were also on the roster.

== Individual and team statistics ==
Arizona State's individual statistical leaders included:

- Rushing: Tony Lorick, 105 carries for 805 rushing yards and a 7.7 yard average;
- Passing: John Torok, 41 of 79 passing for 600 yards, a 51.9% completion percentage, eight touchdowns and five interceptions;
- Scoring: Tony Lorick, 54 points on nine touchdowns;
- Receiving: (tie) Herman Harrison, 23 receptions for 371 yards and four touchdowns;
- Interceptions: Tony Lorick, four interceptions and 107 return yards;
- Punting: John Seedborg, 31 punts for 1,164 yards and an average punt of 37.5 yards;
- Kickoff returns: Charley Taylor, six returns for 183 yards;
- Punt returns: Charley Taylor, nine returns for 125 yards.

Tony Lorick tied a single season school record with two interceptions returned for touchdowns.

Arizona State set a single-season school records for the fewest offensive plays (563) and for the fewest fumbles recovered (seven).

Arizona State team statistics included the following:

- Rushing: 226.4 yards per game on offense, 155.4 rushing yards allowed per game on defense;
- Passing: 133.0 yards per game on offense, 122.3 yards allowed per game on defense;
- Total offense: 359.4 yards per game on offense, 277.8 yards allowed per game on defense;
- Scoring: 27.7 points per game on offense, 13.6 points allowed per game;
- First downs: 162 first downs on offense, 126 first downs allowed on defense; and
- Punts: 37 total punts for an average of 38.8 yards, opponents punted 55 times for an average of 35.8 yards.

== Awards and honors ==
Fullback Tony Lorick and wingback Charley Taylor received first-team honors on the 1963 All-Western Athletic Conference team. Tight end Herman Harrison, right guard Joe Kush, and right tackle/punter John Seedborg received second-team honors.

Team awards were presented as follows:

- Fullback Tony Lorick won the Sun Angel Award;
- Center Chris Stetzar won the Mike Bartholomew Award;
- Joe Pico won the Cecil Abono Captains Award for the second consecutive season; and
- Right tackle and punter John Seedborg won the Glen Hawkins Sportsmanship Award.

Fullback Tony Lorick and wingback Charley Taylor played in the 1964 Coaches All-America Game and the 1964 College All-Star Game. Taylor earned MVP honors for the college squad in the Chicago Tribune-sponsored charity game with the NFL champions. Taylor also played in the 1964 East–West Shrine Game and the 1964 Hula Bowl.
