= 1965 State College of Iowa Panthers football team =

American college football season

1965 State College of Iowa Panthers football
- Conference: North Central Conference
- Record: 4–5 (4–2 NCC)
- Head coach: Stan Sheriff (7th season)
- Home stadium: O. R. Latham Stadium

1965 North Central Conference football standings
	Conf.					Overall
Team	W		L		T	W		L		T
North Dakota State $	6	–	0	–	0	11	–	0	–	0
North Dakota	5	–	1	–	0	9	–	1	–	0
State College of Iowa	4	–	2	–	0	4	–	5	–	0
Morningside	3	–	3	–	0	5	–	4	–	0
Augustana (SD)	1	–	4	–	1	1	–	6	–	1
South Dakota State	1	–	4	–	1	1	–	8	–	1
South Dakota	0	–	6	–	0	2	–	8	–	0
$ – Conference champion

The 1965 State College of Iowa Panthers football team represented the State College of Iowa (later renamed University of Northern Iowa) as a member of the North Central Conference (NCC) during the 1965 NCAA College Division football season. In its seventh season under head coach Stan Sheriff, the team compiled a 4–5 record (4–2 in conference games) and finished in third place in the NCC.

Four S.C.I. players were named to the all-NCC team: fullback Randy Schultz; tackle Merle Masonholder; guard Ray Pedersen; and linebacker Loren Buser.

The team played its home games at O. R. Latham Stadium in Cedar Falls, Iowa.

== Schedule ==
Date	Opponent	Site	Result	Attendance	Source
September 11	Northern Michigan*	O. R. Latham Stadium; Cedar Falls, IA	L 7–10		
September 18	at Southern Illinois*	McAndrew Stadium; Carbondale, IL	L 16–23	7,200	
September 25	at North Dakota State	Dacotah Field; Fargo, ND	L 7–20	7,200	
October 2	North Dakota	O. R. Latham Stadium; Cedar Falls, IA	L 0–34	6,500	
October 9	at Drake*	Drake Stadium; Des Moines, IA	L 7–31		
October 16	Morningside	O. R. Latham Stadium; Cedar Falls, IA	W 14–7		
October 23	Augustana (SD)	O. R. Latham Stadium; Cedar Falls, IA	W 27–22	6,000	
October 30	at South Dakota State	Brookings, SD	W 41–0	6,200	
November 6	South Dakota	O. R. Latham Stadium; Cedar Falls, IA	W 41–0	3,000	
*Non-conference game
