= 1964 Idaho State Bengals football team =

American college football season

1964 Idaho State Bengals football
- Conference: Big Sky Conference
- Record: 6–3 (2–1 Big Sky)
- Head coach: Babe Caccia (13th season)
- Home stadium: Spud Bowl

1964 Big Sky Conference football standings
	Conf.					Overall
Team	W		L		T	W		L		T
Montana State $	3	–	0	–	0	7	–	4	–	0
Idaho State	2	–	1	–	0	6	–	3	–	0
Montana	1	–	2	–	0	3	–	6	–	0
Weber State	0	–	3	–	0	2	–	6	–	0
Idaho *	0	–	0	–	0	4	–	6	–	0
$ – Conference champion; * – Insufficient number of games for conference championship

The 1964 Idaho State Bengals football team represented Idaho State University as a member of the Big Sky Conference during the 1964 NCAA College Division football season. Led by 13th-year head coach Babe Caccia, the Bengals compiled an overall record of 6–3, with a mark of 2–1 in conference play, and finished second in the Big Sky.

== Schedule ==
Date	Opponent	Site	Result	Attendance	Source
September 19	Omaha*	Spud Bowl; Pocatello, ID	W 30–0	5,800	
September 26	at College of Idaho*	Simplot Stadium; Caldwell, ID	W 47–7	4,200–4,500	
October 3	Arizona State–Flagstaff*	Spud Bowl; Pocatello, ID	L 21–28	4,500–6,000	
October 10	Fresno State*^{†}	Spud Bowl; Pocatello, ID	W 20–12	6,100–6,400	
October 17	at Montana State	Gatton Field; Bozeman, MT	L 0–20	6,500–7,000	
October 24	at Weber State	WSC Stadium; Ogden, UT	W 31–0	5,000–5,280	
October 31	Montana	Spud Bowl; Pocatello, ID	W 14–7	3,800	
November 7	North Dakota State*	Spud Bowl; Pocatello, ID	L 21–28	3,500	
November 14	at Cal Poly*	Mustang Stadium; San Luis Obispo, CA	W 20–0	3,893–4,500	
*Non-conference game; ^{†}Homecoming
