= 1965 Weber State Wildcats football team =

American college football season

1965 Weber State Wildcats football

Big Sky co-champion
- Conference: Big Sky Conference
- Record: 8–1 (3–1 Big Sky)
- Head coach: Sark Arslanian (1st season)
- Home stadium: Wildcat Stadium

1965 Big Sky Conference football standings
	Conf.					Overall
Team	W		L		T	W		L		T
Weber State +	3	–	1	–	0	8	–	1	–	0
Idaho +	3	–	1	–	0	5	–	5	–	0
Montana	2	–	2	–	0	4	–	6	–	0
Idaho State	1	–	3	–	0	3	–	5	–	1
Montana State	1	–	3	–	0	3	–	7	–	0
+ – Conference co-champions

The 1965 Weber State Wildcats football team represented Weber State College (now known as Weber State University) as a member of the Big Sky Conference during the 1965 NCAA College Division football season. Led by first-year head coach Sark Arslanian, the Wildcats compiled an overall record of 8–1, with a mark of 3–1 in conference play, and finished as Big Sky co-champion.

== Schedule ==
Date	Opponent	Site	Result	Attendance	Source
September 18	Arizona State–Flagstaff*	Wildcat Stadium; Ogden, UT	W 21–14	3,742	
September 25	at Eastern Montana*	Bjorgum Field; Billings, MT	W 42–7	400	
October 2	Montana State	Wildcat Stadium; Ogden, UT	W 19–16	7,428	
October 9	Montana	Wildcat Stadium; Ogden, UT	L 14–15	7,867	
October 16	Whitworth*	Wildcat Stadium; Ogden, UT	W 44–13	4,683	
October 23	at Idaho State	Spud Bowl; Pocatello, ID	W 28–17	4,164	
October 30	at Western State (CO)	Gunnison, CO	W 14–7	4,000	
November 6	Idaho	Wildcat Stadium; Ogden, UT	W 14–7	8,029	
November 13	Portland State*	Wildcat Stadium; Ogden, UT	W 74–6	3,544	
*Non-conference game
