= 1963 Idaho State Bengals football team =

American college football season

1963 Idaho State Bengals football

Big Sky champion
- Conference: Big Sky Conference
- Record: 5–3 (3–1 Big Sky)
- Head coach: Babe Caccia (12th season)
- Home stadium: Spud Bowl

1963 Big Sky Conference football standings
	Conf.					Overall
Team	W		L		T	W		L		T
Idaho State $	3	–	1	–	0	5	–	3	–	0
Montana State	2	–	1	–	0	6	–	3	–	0
Weber State	1	–	2	–	0	6	–	3	–	0
Montana	0	–	3	–	0	1	–	9	–	0
Idaho *	1	–	0	–	0	5	–	4	–	0
$ – Conference champion; * – Insufficient number of games for conference championship

The 1963 Idaho State Bengals football team represented Idaho State University in the Big Sky Conference during the 1963 NCAA College Division football season.. Led by 12th-year head coach Babe Caccia, the Bengals compiled an overall record of 5–3 with a mark of 3–1 in conference play, winning the Big Sky title.

== Schedule ==
Date	Opponent	Site	Result	Attendance	Source
September 21	Nevada*	Spud Bowl; Pocatello, ID	W 36–19		
September 28	at Omaha*	Caniglia Field; Omaha, NE	L 6–19		
October 5	at Arizona State–Flagstaff*	Lumberjack Stadium; Flagstaff, AZ	W 13–2	5,500	
October 12	at Montana	Dornblaser Field; Missoula, MT	W 14–13	7,500	
October 26	Montana State	Spud Bowl; Pocatello, ID	W 19–15	6,000	
November 2	at Drake*	Drake Stadium; Des Moines, IA	L 12–15	8,500	
November 9	Weber State	Spud Bowl; Pocatello, ID	W 36–26		
November 16	Idaho	Spud Bowl; Pocatello, ID (rivalry)	L 0–14	6,500	
*Non-conference game
