= 1965 Idaho State Bengals football team =

American college football season

1965 Idaho State Bengals football
- Conference: Big Sky Conference
- Record: 3–5–1 (1–3 Big Sky)
- Head coach: Babe Caccia (14th season)
- Home stadium: Spud Bowl

1965 Big Sky Conference football standings
	Conf.					Overall
Team	W		L		T	W		L		T
Weber State +	3	–	1	–	0	8	–	1	–	0
Idaho +	3	–	1	–	0	5	–	5	–	0
Montana	2	–	2	–	0	4	–	6	–	0
Idaho State	1	–	3	–	0	3	–	5	–	1
Montana State	1	–	3	–	0	3	–	7	–	0
+ – Conference co-champions

The 1965 Idaho State Bengals football team represented Idaho State University as a member of the Big Sky Conference during the 1965 NCAA College Division football season. Led by 14th-year head coach Babe Caccia, the Bengals compiled an overall record of 3–5–1, with a mark of 1–3 in conference play, and finished tied for fourth in the Big Sky.

== Schedule ==
Date	Opponent	Site	Result	Attendance	Source
September 18	at Omaha*	Caniglia Field; Omaha, NE	L 14–26	5,481	
September 25	College of Idaho*	Spud Bowl; Pocatello, ID	W 48–7	4,100	
October 2	at Montana	Dornblaser Field; Missoula, MT	L 0–16	6,200	
October 9	at Arizona State–Flagstaff*	Lumberjack Stadium; Flagstaff, AZ	T 0–0	6,200	
October 16	Montana State	Spud Bowl; Pocatello, ID	W 14–0	6,400	
October 23	Weber State	Spud Bowl; Pocatello, ID	L 17–28	4,164	
October 30	Portland State*	Spud Bowl; Pocatello, ID	W 27–7	3,823	
November 6	North Dakota*	Spud Bowl; Pocatello, ID	L 0–27	2,900–4,052	
November 13	at Idaho	Neale Stadium; Moscow, ID	L 7–15	12,250	
*Non-conference game
