= 1964 Montana Grizzlies football team =

American college football season

1964 Montana Grizzlies football
- Conference: Big Sky Conference
- Record: 3–6 (1–2 Big Sky)
- Head coach: Hugh Davidson (1st season)
- Home stadium: Dornblaser Field

1964 Big Sky Conference football standings
	Conf.					Overall
Team	W		L		T	W		L		T
Montana State $	3	–	0	–	0	7	–	4	–	0
Idaho State	2	–	1	–	0	6	–	3	–	0
Montana	1	–	2	–	0	3	–	6	–	0
Weber State	0	–	3	–	0	2	–	6	–	0
Idaho *	0	–	0	–	0	4	–	6	–	0
$ – Conference champion; * – Insufficient number of games for conference championship

The 1964 Montana Grizzlies football team represented the University of Montana in the 1964 NCAA College Division football season as a member of the Big Sky Conference (Big Sky). The Grizzlies were led by first-year head coach Hugh Davidson, played their home games at Dornblaser Field and finished the season with a record of three wins and six losses (3–6, 1–2 Big Sky).

== Schedule ==
Date	Opponent	Site	Result	Attendance	Source
September 12	UBC*	Dornblaser Field; Missoula, MT	W 29–24	3,500	
September 19	at Pacific (CA)*	Pacific Memorial Stadium; Stockton, CA	L 7–23	9,000	
September 26	at New Mexico*	University Stadium; Albuquerque, NM	L 0–20	24,805	
October 3	Utah State*	Dornblaser Field; Missoula, MT	L 0–41	5,200	
October 17	Weber State^{†}	Dornblaser Field; Missoula, MT	W 20–12	8,200	
October 24	Western Illinois*	Dornblaser Field; Missoula, MT	W 7–0	3,500	
October 31	at Idaho State	Spud Bowl; Pocatello, ID	L 7–14	3,800	
November 7	Montana State	Dornblaser Field; Missoula, MT (rivalry)	L 6–30	10,500	
November 14	at San Diego Marines*	Hall Field; San Diego, CA	L 7–43	2,348	
*Non-conference game; ^{†}Homecoming

== After the season ==
The following Grizzly was selected in the 1965 NFL draft after the season.

Round	Pick	Player	Position	NFL club
12	163	Mike Tilleman	Tackle	Minnesota Vikings
