= 1963 Arizona Wildcats football team =

American college football season

1963 Arizona Wildcats football
- Conference: Western Athletic Conference
- Record: 5–5 (2–2 WAC)
- Head coach: Jim LaRue (5th season)
- Captains: Ted Christy; Jerry Zeman
- Home stadium: Arizona Stadium

1963 Western Athletic Conference football standings
	Conf.					Overall
Team	W		L		T	W		L		T
Arizona State *	3	–	0	–	0	8	–	1	–	0
New Mexico $	3	–	1	–	0	6	–	4	–	0
Arizona	2	–	2	–	0	5	–	5	–	0
Utah	2	–	2	–	0	4	–	6	–	0
Wyoming	2	–	3	–	0	6	–	4	–	0
BYU	0	–	4	–	0	2	–	8	–	0
$ – Conference champion; * – Ineligible for conference title due to playing fewer than qualifying number of games

The 1963 Arizona Wildcats football team represented the University of Arizona in the Western Athletic Conference (WAC) during the 1963 NCAA University Division football season. In their fifth season under head coach Jim LaRue, the Wildcats compiled a 5–5 record (2–2 in WAC, tie for third), and were outscored 166 to 136. The team captains were fullback Ted Christy and tackle Jerry Zeman, and their seven home games were played on campus at Arizona Stadium in Tucson.

Arizona's final two games against their rivals were originally going to be played on November 23 (vs. New Mexico) and November 30 (at Arizona State). However, in the wake of the assassination of John F. Kennedy, all college football games were cancelled on November 23, and the Arizona–New Mexico game was rescheduled for December 7, while the Arizona State game remained as scheduled on November 30. The Wildcats went to lose both games.

The team's statistical leaders included Bill Brechler with 550 passing yards, Jim Oliver with 214 rushing yards, and Rickie Harris with 173 receiving yards.

== Schedule ==
Date	Time	Opponent	Site	Result	Attendance	Source
September 21		Utah State*	Arizona Stadium; Tucson, AZ	L 0–43	25,000	
September 28	8:00 p.m.	BYU	Arizona Stadium; Tucson, AZ	W 33–7		
October 5	9:00 p.m.	at Washington State*	Joe Albi Stadium; Spokane, WA	L 2–7	18,200	
October 12		Texas Western*	Arizona Stadium; Tucson, AZ	W 13–7	24,300	
October 19		Oregon*	Arizona Stadium; Tucson, AZ	L 12–28	16,000	
October 26		at West Texas State*	Buffalo Bowl; Canyon, TX	W 6–3	17,376	
November 2		Wyoming	Arizona Stadium; Tucson, AZ	W 15–7	10,000	
November 9		Idaho*	Arizona Stadium; Tucson, AZ	W 34–7	17,000	
November 30		at Arizona State	Sun Devil Stadium; Tempe, AZ (rivalry)	L 6–35	41,141	
December 7		New Mexico	Arizona Stadium; Tucson, AZ (rivalry)	L 15–22	17,000	
*Non-conference game; All times are in Mountain time

== Coaching staff ==
- Ron Marciniak
- Ed Cavanaugh
- Phil Ramsey
- Jake Rowden
