= 1965 South Dakota Coyotes football team =

American college football season

1965 South Dakota Coyotes football
- Conference: North Central Conference
- Record: 2–8 (0–6 NCC)
- Head coach: Marv Rist (2nd season)
- Home stadium: Inman Field

1965 North Central Conference football standings
	Conf.					Overall
Team	W		L		T	W		L		T
North Dakota State $	6	–	0	–	0	11	–	0	–	0
North Dakota	5	–	1	–	0	9	–	1	–	0
State College of Iowa	4	–	2	–	0	4	–	5	–	0
Morningside	3	–	3	–	0	5	–	4	–	0
Augustana (SD)	1	–	4	–	1	1	–	6	–	1
South Dakota State	1	–	4	–	1	1	–	8	–	1
South Dakota	0	–	6	–	0	2	–	8	–	0
$ – Conference champion

The 1965 South Dakota Coyotes football team was an American football team that represented the University of South Dakota in the North Central Conference (NCC) during the 1965 NCAA College Division football season. In its second season under head coach Marv Rist, the team compiled a 2–8 record (0–6 against NCC opponents), finished in seventh place out of seven teams in the NCC, and was outscored by a total of 326 to 61. The team played its home games at Inman Field in Vermillion, South Dakota.

== Schedule ==
Date	Opponent	Site	Result	Attendance	Source
September 18	vs. Montana*	Daylis Stadium; Billings, MT	W 15–14	4,500–5,500	
September 25	Drake*	Inman Field; Vermillion, SD	L 0–17	6,000	
October 2	Augustana (SD)	Inman Field; Vermillion, SD	L 0–43	5,600	
October 9	Morningside	Inman Field; Vermillion, SD	L 0–41	4,000	
October 16	at South Dakota State	Coughlin–Alumni Stadium; Brookings, SD (rivalry)	L 14–30	9,000	
October 23	North Dakota	Inman Field; Vermillion, SD (Sitting Bull Trophy)	L 7–33	9,500	
October 30	at No. 1 North Dakota State	Dacotah Field; Fargo, ND	L 8–66	5,500	
November 6	at State College of Iowa	O. R. Latham Stadium; Cedar Falls, IA	L 0–41	3,000	
November 13	at Cincinnati*	Nippert Stadium; Cincinnati, OH	L 0–41	12,000	
November 20	at Colorado State–Greeley*	Jackson Field; Greeley, CO	W 17–0	3,000	
*Non-conference game; Rankings from AP Poll released prior to the game
