= 1963 Utah Utes football team =

American college football season

1963 Utah Utes football
- Conference: Western Athletic Conference
- Record: 4–6 (2–2 WAC)
- Head coach: Ray Nagel (6th season)
- Home stadium: Ute Stadium

1963 Western Athletic Conference football standings
	Conf.					Overall
Team	W		L		T	W		L		T
Arizona State *	3	–	0	–	0	8	–	1	–	0
New Mexico $	3	–	1	–	0	6	–	4	–	0
Arizona	2	–	2	–	0	5	–	5	–	0
Utah	2	–	2	–	0	4	–	6	–	0
Wyoming	2	–	3	–	0	6	–	4	–	0
BYU	0	–	4	–	0	2	–	8	–	0
$ – Conference champion; * – Ineligible for conference title due to playing fewer than qualifying number of games

The 1963 Utah Utes football team, or also commonly known as the Utah Redskins, was an American football team that represented the University of Utah as a member of the Western Athletic Conference (WAC) during the 1963 NCAA University Division football season. In their sixth season under head coach Ray Nagel, the Utes compiled an overall record of 4–6 with a mark of 2–2 against conference opponents, tying for third place in the WAC. Home games were played on campus at Ute Stadium in Salt Lake City.

== Schedule ==
Date	Opponent	Site	Result	Attendance	Source
September 21	Oregon State*	Ute Stadium; Salt Lake City, UT	L 14–29	17,381	
September 28	vs. Idaho*	old Bronco Stadium; Boise, ID	L 9–10	10,000	
October 5	at New Mexico	University Stadium; Albuquerque, NM	W 19–6	20,026	
October 12	BYU	Ute Stadium; Salt Lake City, UT (rivalry)	W 15–6	25,494	
October 19	Colorado State*	Ute Stadium; Salt Lake City, UT	W 48–14	9,812	
October 26	Wyoming^{†}	Ute Stadium; Salt Lake City, UT	L 23–26	25,339	
November 2	at Arizona State	Sun Devil Stadium; Tempe, AZ	L 22–30	28,549	
November 9	at Army*	Michie Stadium; West Point, NY	L 7–8	22,400	
November 16	California*	Ute Stadium; Salt Lake City, UT	L 22–35	13,974	
November 23	at Utah State*	Romney Stadium; Logan, UT (rivalry)	W 25–23	15,520	
*Non-conference game; ^{†}Homecoming

== NFL draft ==
Two players were selected in the 1964 NFL draft.

Player	Position	Round	Pick	NFL team
Allen Jacobs	Back	10	139	Green Bay Packers
Andrew Ireland	Back	16	223	Green Bay Packers
