= 1964 Weber State Wildcats football team =

American college football season

1964 Weber State Wildcats football
- Conference: Big Sky Conference
- Record: 2–6 (0–3 Big Sky)
- Head coach: Wally Nalder (9th season)
- Home stadium: WSC Stadium

1964 Big Sky Conference football standings
	Conf.					Overall
Team	W		L		T	W		L		T
Montana State $	3	–	0	–	0	7	–	4	–	0
Idaho State	2	–	1	–	0	6	–	3	–	0
Montana	1	–	2	–	0	3	–	6	–	0
Weber State	0	–	3	–	0	2	–	6	–	0
Idaho *	0	–	0	–	0	4	–	6	–	0
$ – Conference champion; * – Insufficient number of games for conference championship

The 1964 Weber State Wildcats football team represented Weber State College (now known as Weber State University) as a member of the Big Sky Conference during the 1964 NCAA College Division football season. Led by ninth-year head coach Wally Nalder, the Wildcats compiled an overall record of 2–6, with a mark of 0–3 in conference play, and finished fourth in the Big Sky.

== Schedule ==
Date	Opponent	Site	Result	Attendance	Source
September 19	at Arizona State–Flagstaff*	Lumberjack Stadium; Flagstaff, AZ	L 6–41	4,200	
September 26	Eastern Montana*	WSC Stadium; Ogden, UT	W 20–0	2,495	
October 3	Southern Colorado State*	WSC Stadium; Ogden, UT	W 19–14	2,620	
October 17	at Montana	Dornblaser Field; Missoula, MT	L 12–20	8,200	
October 24	Idaho State^{†}	WSC Stadium; Ogden, UT	L 0–31	5,000–5,280	
October 31	Western State (CO)*	WSC Stadium; Ogden, UT	L 0–7	967	
November 14	Montana State	WSC Stadium; Ogden, UT	L 0–24	500	
November 21	at Portland State*	Franklin High School Stadium; Portland, OR	L 10–18	300	
*Non-conference game; ^{†}Homecoming
