= 1963 Montana State Bobcats football team =

American college football season

1963 Montana State Bobcats football
- Conference: Big Sky Conference
- Record: 6–3 (2–1 Big Sky)
- Head coach: Jim Sweeney (1st season)
- Home stadium: Gatton Field

1963 Big Sky Conference football standings
	Conf.					Overall
Team	W		L		T	W		L		T
Idaho State $	3	–	1	–	0	5	–	3	–	0
Montana State	2	–	1	–	0	6	–	3	–	0
Weber State	1	–	2	–	0	6	–	3	–	0
Montana	0	–	3	–	0	1	–	9	–	0
Idaho *	1	–	0	–	0	5	–	4	–	0
$ – Conference champion; * – Insufficient number of games for conference championship

The 1963 Montana State Bobcats football team was an American football team that represented Montana State College (now known as Montana State University) in the Big Sky Conference during the 1963 NCAA College Division football season. In its first season under head coach Jim Sweeney, the team compiled a 6–3 record and finished second out of four teams in the Big Sky Conference.

== Schedule ==
Date	Time	Opponent	Site	Result	Attendance	Source
September 14	8:00 p.m.	vs. South Dakota State*	Memorial Stadium; Great Falls, MT	L 6–9	6,500	
September 21		at Tulsa*	Skelly Stadium; Tulsa, OK	L 13–23	13,400	
September 28		Fresno State*	Gatton Field; Bozeman, MT	W 29–7	6,500–7,000	
October 5		at Nevada*	Mackay Stadium; Reno, NV	W 41–13	1,800	
October 12		at Weber State	Municipal Stadium; Ogden, UT	W 26–8	6,500	
October 19		Arizona State–Flagstaff*^{†}	Gatton Field; Bozeman, MT	W 28–7	7,500	
October 26		at Idaho State	Spud Bowl; Pocatello, ID	L 15–19	6,000	
November 2		North Dakota*	Gatton Field; Bozeman, MT	W 19–0	3,100	
November 9		Montana	Gatton Field; Bozeman, MT (rivalry)	W 18–3	8,500	
*Non-conference game; ^{†}Homecoming; All times are in Mountain time
