= 1965 North Dakota State Bison football team =

American college football season

1965 North Dakota State Bison football

AP small college national champion; UPI small college national champion; NCC champion

Pecan Bowl, W 20–7 vs. Grambling
- Conference: North Central Conference

Ranking
- AP: No. 1 (small college)
- Record: 11–0 (6–0 NCC)
- Head coach: Darrell Mudra (3rd season)
- Home stadium: Dacotah Field

1965 North Central Conference football standings
	Conf.					Overall
Team	W		L		T	W		L		T
North Dakota State $	6	–	0	–	0	11	–	0	–	0
North Dakota	5	–	1	–	0	9	–	1	–	0
State College of Iowa	4	–	2	–	0	4	–	5	–	0
Morningside	3	–	3	–	0	5	–	4	–	0
Augustana (SD)	1	–	4	–	1	1	–	6	–	1
South Dakota State	1	–	4	–	1	1	–	8	–	1
South Dakota	0	–	6	–	0	2	–	8	–	0
$ – Conference champion

The 1965 North Dakota State Bison football team was an American football team that represented North Dakota State University as a member of the North Central Conference (NCC) during the 1965 NCAA College Division football season. In their third season under head coach Darrell Mudra, the team compiled an 11–0 record (6–0 against conference opponents). The team was ranked No. 1 in the AP and UPI small college polls.

== Schedule ==
Date	Opponent	Rank	Site	Result	Attendance	Source
September 10	Milwaukee*		Dacotah Field; Fargo, ND	W 59–20	4,500	
September 18	Minnesota–Duluth*		Dacotah Field; Fargo, ND	W 55–8	12,000	
September 25	State College of Iowa		Dacotah Field; Fargo, ND	W 20–7	7,200	
October 2	at South Dakota State	No. 1	Coughlin–Alumni Stadium; Brookings, SD (rivalry)	W 41–13	4,500	
October 9	at Augustana (SD)	No. 1	Howard Wood Stadium; Sioux Falls, SD	W 47–7	6,464	
October 16	No. 9 North Dakota	No. 1	Dacotah Field; Fargo, ND (Nickel Trophy)	W 6–3	7,927–11,500	
October 23	at Montana State*	No. 1	Gatton Field; Bozeman, MT	W 14–7	8,000–8,200	
October 30	South Dakota	No. 1	Dacotah Field; Fargo, ND	W 66–8	5,500	
November 6	at Morningside	No. 1	Roberts Stadium; Sioux City, IA	W 42–0	4,000	
November 13	at St. Thomas (MN)*	No. 1	O'Shaughnessy Stadium; Saint Paul, MN	W 13–7	3,000	
December 11	No. T–13 Grambling	No. 1	Public Schools Stadium; Abilene, TX (Pecan Bowl)	W 20–7	9,000	
*Non-conference game; Rankings from AP Poll released prior to the game
