= 1963 North Dakota State Bison football team =

American college football season

1963 North Dakota State Bison football
- Conference: North Central Conference
- Record: 3–5 (3–3 NCC)
- Head coach: Darrell Mudra (1st season)
- Home stadium: Dacotah Field

1963 North Central Conference football standings
	Conf.					Overall
Team	W		L		T	W		L		T
South Dakota State $	6	–	0	–	0	9	–	1	–	0
North Dakota	4	–	2	–	0	6	–	3	–	0
State College of Iowa	4	–	2	–	0	5	–	3	–	1
North Dakota State	3	–	3	–	0	3	–	5	–	0
Augustana (SD)	2	–	4	–	0	2	–	8	–	0
Morningside	1	–	5	–	0	3	–	5	–	0
South Dakota	1	–	5	–	0	1	–	7	–	0
$ – Conference champion

The 1963 North Dakota State Bison football team was an American football team that represented North Dakota Agricultural College (now known as North Dakota State University) in the North Central Conference (NCC) during the 1963 NCAA College Division football season. In its first season under head coach Darrell Mudra, the team compiled a 3–5 record (3–3 against NCC opponents) and finished in fourth place out of seven teams in the NCC. The team played its home games at Dacotah Field in Fargo, North Dakota.

== Schedule ==
Date	Opponent	Site	Result	Attendance	Source
September 14	Moorhead State*	Dacotah Field; Fargo, ND	L 14–31	6,825	
September 21	South Dakota	Dacotah Field; Fargo, ND	W 53–8	6,205	
September 28	at Morningside	Sioux City, IA	W 33–18	6,080	
October 5	State College of Iowa	Dacotah Field; Fargo, ND	W 21–0	8,069	
October 12	at Augustana (SD)	Sioux Falls, SD	L 6–26	6,000	
October 19	North Dakota	Dacotah Field; Fargo, ND (Nickel Trophy)	L 7–21	8,871	
October 26	at No. 7 South Dakota State	Brookings, SD (rivalry)	L 25–40	4,500	
November 9	at Southern Illinois*	McAndrew Stadium; Carbondale, IL	L 15–20	11,101–11,500	
*Non-conference game; Rankings from AP Poll released prior to the game
