= 1964 Montana State Bobcats football team =

American college football season

1964 Montana State Bobcats football

Big Sky champion Camellia Bowl champion

Camellia Bowl, W 28–7 at Sacramento State
- Conference: Big Sky Conference
- Record: 7–4 (3–0 Big Sky)
- Head coach: Jim Sweeney (2nd season)
- Home stadium: Gatton Field

1964 Big Sky Conference football standings
	Conf.					Overall
Team	W		L		T	W		L		T
Montana State $	3	–	0	–	0	7	–	4	–	0
Idaho State	2	–	1	–	0	6	–	3	–	0
Montana	1	–	2	–	0	3	–	6	–	0
Weber State	0	–	3	–	0	2	–	6	–	0
Idaho *	0	–	0	–	0	4	–	6	–	0
$ – Conference champion; * – Insufficient number of games for conference championship

The 1964 Montana State Bobcats football team was an American football team that represented Montana State College (now known as Montana State University) in the Big Sky Conference during the 1964 NCAA College Division football season. In its second season under head coach Jim Sweeney, the team compiled a 7–4 record (3–0 against Big Sky opponents), won the conference championship, and defeated Sacramento State in the Camellia Bowl.

== Schedule ==
Date	Opponent	Site	Result	Attendance	Source
September 12	at South Dakota State*	Alumni Stadium; Brookings, SD	W 46–14	5,000	
September 19	at Wichita State*	Veterans Field; Wichita, KS	L 6–21	12,500–12,567	
September 26	Fresno State*	Gatton Field; Bozeman, MT	W 27–13	5,500–8,000	
October 3	San Jose State*	Gatton Field; Bozeman, MT	L 14–20	5,500	
October 10	Nevada*	Gatton Field; Bozeman, MT	W 21–14	4,500–4,700	
October 17	Idaho State^{†}	Gatton Field; Bozeman, MT	W 20–0	6,500–7,000	
October 24	at North Dakota State*	Dacotah Field; Fargo, ND	L 0–7	4,500	
October 31	at North Dakota*	Memorial Stadium; Grand Forks, ND	L 7–9	4,000–4,239	
November 7	at Montana	Dornblaser Field; Missoula, MT (rivalry)	W 30–6	10,500	
November 14	at Weber State	WSC Stadium; Ogden, UT	W 24–0	500	
December 12	vs. Sacramento State*	Charles C. Hughes Stadium; Sacramento, CA (Camellia Bowl)	W 28–7	10,000	
*Non-conference game; ^{†}Homecoming
