= 1963 Weber State Wildcats football team =

American college football season

1963 Weber State Wildcats football
- Conference: Big Sky Conference
- Record: 6–3 (1–2 Big Sky)
- Head coach: Wally Nalder (8th season)
- Home stadium: WSC Stadium; Municipal Stadium

1963 Big Sky Conference football standings
	Conf.					Overall
Team	W		L		T	W		L		T
Idaho State $	3	–	1	–	0	5	–	3	–	0
Montana State	2	–	1	–	0	6	–	3	–	0
Weber State	1	–	2	–	0	6	–	3	–	0
Montana	0	–	3	–	0	1	–	9	–	0
Idaho *	1	–	0	–	0	5	–	4	–	0
$ – Conference champion; * – Insufficient number of games for conference championship

The 1963 Weber State Wildcats football team represented Weber State College (now known as Weber State University) as a member of the Big Sky Conference during the 1963 NCAA College Division football season. Led by eighth-year head coach Wally Nalder, the Wildcats compiled an overall record of 6–3, with a mark of 1–2 in conference play, and finished third in the Big Sky.

== Schedule ==
Date	Opponent	Site	Result	Attendance	Source
September 14	at Eastern Montana*	Bjorgum Field; Billings, MT	W 13–7		
September 21	Southern Oregon*	WSC Stadium; Ogden, UT	W 40–32	3,500	
September 28	at Oregon Tech*	Modoc Field; Klamath Falls, OR	W 29–7		
October 5	at Southern Colorado State*	Pueblo, CO	W 28–14		
October 12	Montana State^{†}	Municipal Stadium; Ogden, UT	L 8–26	6,500	
October 26	Eastern Oregon*	WSC Stadium; Ogden, UT	W 48–7		
November 2	Montana	Municipal Stadium; Ogden, UT	W 19–13	3,500	
November 9	at Idaho State	Spud Bowl; Pocatello, ID	L 26–36	4,600	
November 16	Western State (CO)*	WSC Stadium; Ogden, UT	L 6–19	1,109	
*Non-conference game; ^{†}Homecoming
