= 1963 South Dakota Coyotes football team =

American college football season

1963 South Dakota Coyotes football
- Conference: North Central Conference
- Record: 1–7 (1–5 NCC)
- Head coach: Marv Rist (1st season)
- Home stadium: Inman Field

1963 North Central Conference football standings
| | Conf. | | | | | Overall |
| Team | W | | L | | T | W | | L | | T |
|---|---|---|---|---|---|---|---|---|---|---|
| South Dakota State $ | 6 | – | 0 | – | 0 | 9 | – | 1 | – | 0 |
| North Dakota | 4 | – | 2 | – | 0 | 6 | – | 3 | – | 0 |
| State College of Iowa | 4 | – | 2 | – | 0 | 5 | – | 3 | – | 1 |
| North Dakota State | 3 | – | 3 | – | 0 | 3 | – | 5 | – | 0 |
| Augustana (SD) | 2 | – | 4 | – | 0 | 2 | – | 8 | – | 0 |
| Morningside | 1 | – | 5 | – | 0 | 3 | – | 5 | – | 0 |
| South Dakota | 1 | – | 5 | – | 0 | 1 | – | 7 | – | 0 |
$ – Conference champion

The 1963 South Dakota Coyotes football team was an American football team that represented the University of South Dakota in the North Central Conference (NCC) during the 1963 NCAA College Division football season. In its first season under head coach Marv Rist, the team compiled a 1–7 record (1–5 against NCC opponents), finished in seventh place out of seven teams in the NCC, and was outscored by a total of 297 to 28. The team played its home games at Inman Field in Vermillion, South Dakota.

== Schedule ==
| Date | Opponent | Site | Result | Attendance | Source |
|---|---|---|---|---|---|
| September 14 | Bemidji State* | Inman Field; Vermillion, SD | L 7–33 | 5,000 | |
| September 21 | at North Dakota State | Dacotah Field; Fargo, ND | L 8–53 | 6,205 | |
| September 28 | at State College of Iowa | O. R. Latham Stadium; Cedar Falls, IA | L 6–33 | | |
| October 5 | at Drake* | Drake Stadium; Des Moines, IA | L 0–23 | 8,000 | |
| October 12 | Morningside | Inman Field; Vermillion, SD | L 0–33 | 7,000 | |
| October 19 | at South Dakota State | Brookings, SD (rivalry) | L 0–61 | 8,500 | |
| October 26 | Augustana (SD) | Inman Field; Vermillion, SD | W 7–6 | 5,000 | |
| November 9 | North Dakota | Inman Field; Vermillion, SD (rivalry) | L 0–55 | 3,000 | |
*Non-conference game
