= 1963 North Dakota Fighting Sioux football team =

American college football season

1963 North Dakota Fighting Sioux football
- Conference: North Central Conference
- Record: 6–3 (4–2 NCC)
- Head coach: Marvin C. Helling (7th season)
- Home stadium: Memorial Stadium

1963 North Central Conference football standings
	Conf.					Overall
Team	W		L		T	W		L		T
South Dakota State $	6	–	0	–	0	9	–	1	–	0
North Dakota	4	–	2	–	0	6	–	3	–	0
State College of Iowa	4	–	2	–	0	5	–	3	–	1
North Dakota State	3	–	3	–	0	3	–	5	–	0
Augustana (SD)	2	–	4	–	0	2	–	8	–	0
Morningside	1	–	5	–	0	3	–	5	–	0
South Dakota	1	–	5	–	0	1	–	7	–	0
$ – Conference champion

The 1963 North Dakota Fighting Sioux football team, also known as the Nodaks, was an American football team that represented the University of North Dakota in the North Central Conference (NCC) during the 1963 NCAA College Division football season. In its seventh year under head coach Marvin C. Helling, the team compiled a 6–3 record (4–2 against NCC opponents), tied for second place out of seven teams in the NCC, and outscored opponents by a total of 162 to 61. The team played its home games at Memorial Stadium in Grand Forks, North Dakota.

== Schedule ==
Date	Opponent	Site	Result	Attendance	Source
September 14	Minnesota Duluth	Memorial Stadium; Grand Forks, ND	W 33–0	5,528	
September 21	Augustana (SD)	Memorial Stadium; Grand Forks, ND	W 7–6	6,075	
September 28	at Montana	Dornblaser Field; Missoula, MT	W 19–13	4,500	
October 5	Morningside	Memorial Stadium; Grand Forks, ND	W 21–0	6,371	
October 12	South Dakota State	Memorial Stadium; Grand Forks, ND	L 6–7	9,000–10,059	
October 19	at North Dakota State	Dacotah Field; Fargo, ND (rivalry)	W 21–7	8,871	
October 26	at State College of Iowa	O. R. Latham Stadium; Cedar Falls, IA	L 0–9	7,500	
November 2	at Montana State	Gatton Field; Bozeman, MT	L 0–19	3,100	
November 9	at South Dakota	Inman Field; Vermillion, SD (rivalry)	W 55–0	3,000	
