= 1963 Montana Grizzlies football team =

American college football season

1963 Montana Grizzlies football
- Conference: Big Sky Conference
- Record: 1–9 (0–3 Big Sky)
- Head coach: Ray Jenkins (6th season)
- Home stadium: Dornblaser Field

1963 Big Sky Conference football standings
	Conf.					Overall
Team	W		L		T	W		L		T
Idaho State $	3	–	1	–	0	5	–	3	–	0
Montana State	2	–	1	–	0	6	–	3	–	0
Weber State	1	–	2	–	0	6	–	3	–	0
Montana	0	–	3	–	0	1	–	9	–	0
Idaho *	1	–	0	–	0	5	–	4	–	0
$ – Conference champion; * – Insufficient number of games for conference championship

The 1963 Montana Grizzlies football team represented the University of Montana in the 1963 NCAA College Division football season as a member of the first-year Big Sky Conference. Led by sixth-year head coach Ray Jenkins, the Grizzlies played their home games at Dornblaser Field and were 1–9 overall, 0–3 in conference.

The rivalry game with Idaho for the Little Brown Stein was not played this season or the following year.

== Schedule ==
Date	Time	Opponent	Site	Result	Attendance	Source
September 14		at UBC*	UBC Stadium; Vancouver, BC	W 16–0	5,260	
September 21	1:30 p.m.	vs. Wyoming*	Daylis Stadium; Billings, MT	L 0–35	8,000	
September 28		North Dakota*	Dornblaser Field; Missoula, MT	L 13–19	4,500	
October 5	8:00 p.m.	at BYU*	Cougar Stadium; Provo, UT	L 0–27		
October 12		Idaho State^{†}	Dornblaser Field; Missoula, MT	L 13–14	7,500	
October 19		Utah State*	Dornblaser Field; Missoula, MT	L 6–62	3,500	
October 26		at New Mexico*	University Stadium; Albuquerque, NM	L 6–24	21,500	
November 2	1:30 p.m.	at Weber State	Municipal Stadium; Ogden, UT	L 13–19		
November 9		at Montana State	Gatton Field; Bozeman, MT (rivalry)	L 3–18	8,500	
November 16		Colorado State*	Dornblaser Field; Missoula, MT	L 12–20	3,000	
*Non-conference game; ^{†}Homecoming; All times are in Mountain time
