= 1963 State College of Iowa Panthers football team =

American college football season

1963 State College of Iowa Panthers football
- Conference: North Central Conference
- Record: 5–3–1 (4–2 NCC)
- Head coach: Stan Sheriff (4th season)
- Home stadium: O. R. Latham Stadium

1963 North Central Conference football standings
	Conf.					Overall
Team	W		L		T	W		L		T
South Dakota State $	6	–	0	–	0	9	–	1	–	0
North Dakota	4	–	2	–	0	6	–	3	–	0
State College of Iowa	4	–	2	–	0	5	–	3	–	1
North Dakota State	3	–	3	–	0	3	–	5	–	0
Augustana (SD)	2	–	4	–	0	2	–	8	–	0
Morningside	1	–	5	–	0	3	–	5	–	0
South Dakota	1	–	5	–	0	1	–	7	–	0
$ – Conference champion

The 1963 State College of Iowa Panthers football team represented the State College of Iowa (later renamed University of Northern Iowa) as a member of the North Central Conference (NCC) during the 1963 NCAA College Division football season. In its third season under head coach Stan Sheriff, the team compiled a 5–3–1 record (4–2 in conference games) and tied for second place in the NCC.

Three S.C.I. players were named to the all-NCC team: halfback Larry Thompson; fullback Randy Schultz; and guard Jim Jackson. Other notable statistical accomplishments included:

- Loren Buser set a school record with an average of 7.76 yards per rushing carry, gaining 163 yards on 21 carries.
- Bruce Montgomery set a school record with an average of 31.25 yards per kick returns, tallying 250 yards on eight returns.

The team played its home games at O. R. Latham Stadium in Cedar Falls, Iowa.

== Schedule ==
Date	Opponent	Site	Result	Attendance	Source
September 15	Northern Michigan	O. R. Latham Stadium; Cedar Falls, IA	W 12–11		
September 22	Mankato State	O. R. Latham Stadium; Cedar Falls, IA	T 14–14		
September 29	South Dakota	O. R. Latham Stadium; Cedar Falls, IA	W 33–6		
October 5	at North Dakota State	Dacotah Field; Fargo, ND	L 0–21	8,069	
October 12	at Drake	Drake Stadium; Des Moines, IA	L 12–21	5,000	
October 19	Morningside	O. R. Latham Field; Cedar Falls, IA	W 49–14		
October 26	North Dakota^{†}	O. R. Latham Field; Cedar Falls, IA	W 9–0	7,500	
November 2	at South Dakota State	Brookings, SD	L 13–27	4,000	
November 9	Augustana (SD)	O. R. Latham Field; Cedar Falls, IA	W 45–6		
^{†}Homecoming
