= 1965 Montana State Bobcats football team =

American college football season

1965 Montana State Bobcats football
- Conference: Big Sky Conference
- Record: 3–7 (1–3 Big Sky)
- Head coach: Jim Sweeney (3rd season)
- Home stadium: Gatton Field

1965 Big Sky Conference football standings
	Conf.					Overall
Team	W		L		T	W		L		T
Weber State +	3	–	1	–	0	8	–	1	–	0
Idaho +	3	–	1	–	0	5	–	5	–	0
Montana	2	–	2	–	0	4	–	6	–	0
Idaho State	1	–	3	–	0	3	–	5	–	1
Montana State	1	–	3	–	0	3	–	7	–	0
+ – Conference co-champions

The 1965 Montana State Bobcats football team was an American football team that represented Montana State University in the Big Sky Conference during the 1965 NCAA College Division football season. In its third season under head coach Jim Sweeney, the team compiled a 3–7 record (1–3 against Big Sky opponents) and finished last in the conference.

== Schedule ==
Date	Opponent	Site	Result	Attendance	Source
September 11	vs. South Dakota State*	Memorial Stadium; Great Falls, MT	W 22–0	5,000	
September 25	Wichita State*	Gatton Field; Bozeman, MT	W 17–6	8,000	
October 2	at Weber State	Wildcat Stadium; Ogden, UT	L 16–19	7,428	
October 9	at Fresno State*	Ratcliffe Stadium; Fresno, CA	L 10–14	10,862–12,000	
October 16	at Idaho State	Spud Bowl; Pocatello, ID	L 0–14	6,400	
October 23	No. 1 North Dakota State*^{†}	Gatton Field; Bozeman, MT	L 7–14	8,000–8,200	
October 30	North Dakota*	Gatton Field; Bozeman, MT	L 12–21	4,000	
November 6	Montana	Gatton Field; Bozeman, MT (rivalry)	W 24–7	9,000	
November 13	at San Jose State*	Spartan Stadium; San Jose, CA	L 7–25	4,000–4,100	
November 20	at Idaho	Neale Stadium; Moscow, ID	L 0–54	3,500	
*Non-conference game; ^{†}Homecoming; Rankings from AP Poll released prior to the game
