= 1965 North Dakota Fighting Sioux football team =

American college football season

1965 North Dakota Fighting Sioux football

Mineral Water Bowl champion

Mineral Water Bowl, W 37–20 vs. Northern Illinois
- Conference: North Central Conference
- Record: 9–1 (5–1 NCC)
- Head coach: Marvin C. Helling (9th season)
- Home stadium: Memorial Stadium

1965 North Central Conference football standings
	Conf.					Overall
Team	W		L		T	W		L		T
North Dakota State $	6	–	0	–	0	11	–	0	–	0
North Dakota	5	–	1	–	0	9	–	1	–	0
State College of Iowa	4	–	2	–	0	4	–	5	–	0
Morningside	3	–	3	–	0	5	–	4	–	0
Augustana (SD)	1	–	4	–	1	1	–	6	–	1
South Dakota State	1	–	4	–	1	1	–	8	–	1
South Dakota	0	–	6	–	0	2	–	8	–	0
$ – Conference champion

The 1965 North Dakota Fighting Sioux football team, also known as the Nodaks, was an American football team that represented the University of North Dakota in the North Central Conference (NCC) during the 1965 NCAA College Division football season. In its ninth year under head coach Marvin C. Helling, the team compiled a 9–1 record (5–1 against NCC opponents), finished in second place out seven teams in the NCC, and outscored opponents by a total of 248 to 85. The team played its home games at Memorial Stadium in Grand Forks, North Dakota.

== Schedule ==
Date	Opponent	Rank	Site	Result	Attendance	Source
September 11	Bemidji State*		Memorial Stadium; Grand Forks, ND	W 20–6	3,677	
September 18	Augustana (SD)		Memorial Stadium; Grand Forks, ND	W 22–13	5,047	
September 25	Morningside		Memorial Stadium; Grand Forks, ND	W 37–14	3,120	
October 2	at State College of Iowa		O. R. Latham Stadium; Cedar Falls, IA	W 34–0	6,500	
October 9	South Dakota State		Memorial Stadium; Grand Forks, ND	W 14–7	8,103	
October 16	at No. 1 North Dakota State	No. 9	Dacotah Field; Fargo, ND (Nickel Trophy)	L 3–6	7,927–11,500	
October 23	at South Dakota		Inman Field; Vermillion, SD (Sitting Bull Trophy)	W 33–7	9,500	
October 30	at Montana State*		Gatton Field; Bozeman, MT	W 21–12	4,000	
November 6	at Idaho State*		Spud Bowl; Pocatello, ID	W 27–0	2,900–4,052	
November 27	vs. No. 6 Northern Illinois*		Roosevelt Field; Excelsior Springs, MO (Mineral Water Bowl)	W 37–20	4,000–5,000	
*Non-conference game; Rankings from AP Poll released prior to the game
