= Hugh Davidson (American football) =

American football player (1928–2020)

Biographical details
- Born: January 19, 1928; Grant, Nebraska, U.S.
- Died: December 29, 2020; Hamilton, Montana, U.S.

Playing career

Football
- 1950–1951: Colorado
- Position: Fullback

Coaching career (HC unless noted)

Football
- 1952–1953: Osborne HS (KS)
- 1954–1957: Colorado (freshmen)
- 1958–1963: Montana (assistant)
- 1964–1966: Montana
- 1970–1971: Idaho State (assistant)

Basketball
- 1952–1954: Osborne HS (KS)

Administrative career (AD unless noted)
- 1972–?: Denver Broncos (scout)

Head coaching record
- Overall: 8–20 (college football); 16–1–1 (high school football)

Hugh Calvin Davidson (January 19, 1928 – December 29, 2020) was an American former football coach and scout. He served as the head football coach at the University of Montana from 1964 to 1966, compiling a record of 8–20.

== Biography ==
A native of Grant, Nebraska, Davidson attended the University of Colorado Boulder, where he played college football for the Colorado Buffaloes as a fullback before graduating in 1962. He began his coaching career at Osborne High School in Osborne, Kansas, where he was head football and head basketball coach. His football teams at Osborne were 16–1–1 in two seasons. Davidson returned to his alma mater, Colorado, in 1954 as freshmen football coach. In 1958, he moved to the University of Montana to serve as an assistant under head football coach Ray Jenkins, a fellow Colorado alumnus who had coached with Davidson as an assistant with the Buffaloes under Dallas Ward. When Jenkins was fired following the 1963 season, Davidson succeeded him as head coach for the Montana Grizzlies. Davidson resigned in 1966 after compiling a record of 8–20 in three seasons. He returned to coaching in 1970 as an assistant at Idaho State University, working under Ed Cavanaugh. In 1972, Davidson was hired as a scout for the Denver Broncos of the National Football League (NFL).

== Head coaching record ==
=== College football ===
Year	Team	Overall	Conference	Standing	Bowl/playoffs
Montana Grizzlies (Big Sky Conference) (1964–1966)
1964	Montana	3–6	1–2	3rd	
1965	Montana	4–6	2–2	3rd	
1964	Montana	1–8	0–4	5th	
Montana:		8–20	3–8		
Total:		8–20			
