= 1963 Wyoming Cowboys football team =

American college football season

1963 Wyoming Cowboys football
- Conference: Western Athletic Conference
- Record: 6–4 (2–3 WAC)
- Head coach: Lloyd Eaton (2nd season)
- Captains: Mack Balls; Tom Delaney
- Home stadium: War Memorial Stadium

1963 Western Athletic Conference football standings
	Conf.					Overall
Team	W		L		T	W		L		T
Arizona State *	3	–	0	–	0	8	–	1	–	0
New Mexico $	3	–	1	–	0	6	–	4	–	0
Arizona	2	–	2	–	0	5	–	5	–	0
Utah	2	–	2	–	0	4	–	6	–	0
Wyoming	2	–	3	–	0	6	–	4	–	0
BYU	0	–	4	–	0	2	–	8	–	0
$ – Conference champion; * – Ineligible for conference title due to playing fewer than qualifying number of games

The 1963 Wyoming Cowboys football team was an American football team that represented the University of Wyoming as a member of the Western Athletic Conference (WAC) during the 1963 NCAA University Division football season. In their second season under head coach Lloyd Eaton, the Cowboys compiled a 6–4 record (2–3 against conference opponents), finished fifth in the WAC, and outscored opponents by a total of 191 to 152. Mack Balls and Tom Delaney were the team captains.

== Schedule ==
Date	Time	Opponent	Site	Result	Attendance	Source
September 21	1:30 p.m.	vs. Montana*	Daylis Stadium; Billings, MT	W 35–0	8,000	
September 28		Utah State*	War Memorial Stadium; Laramie, WY (rivalry)	W 21–14	18,221	
October 5		Kansas*	War Memorial Stadium; Laramie, WY	L 21–25	18,121	
October 12		Colorado State*	War Memorial Stadium; Laramie, WY (rivalry)	W 21–3	12,442	
October 19		BYU	War Memorial Stadium; Laramie, WY	W 41–14	15,641	
October 26		at Utah	Ute Stadium; Salt Lake City, UT	W 26–23	25,339	
November 2		at Arizona	Arizona Stadium; Tucson, AZ	L 7–15	10,000	
November 9		at New Mexico	University Stadium; Albuquerque, NM	L 6–17	18,769	
November 16		at Arizona State	Sun Devil Stadium; Tempe, AZ	L 6–35	30,734	
December 7		at Texas Western*	Sun Bowl; El Paso, TX	W 7–6	7,415	
*Non-conference game; All times are in Mountain time
