= 1965 Montana Grizzlies football team =

American college football season

1965 Montana Grizzlies football
- Conference: Big Sky Conference
- Record: 4–6 (2–2 Big Sky)
- Head coach: Hugh Davidson (2nd season)
- Home stadium: Dornblaser Field

1965 Big Sky Conference football standings
	Conf.					Overall
Team	W		L		T	W		L		T
Weber State +	3	–	1	–	0	8	–	1	–	0
Idaho +	3	–	1	–	0	5	–	5	–	0
Montana	2	–	2	–	0	4	–	6	–	0
Idaho State	1	–	3	–	0	3	–	5	–	1
Montana State	1	–	3	–	0	3	–	7	–	0
+ – Conference co-champions

The 1965 Montana Grizzlies football team represented the University of Montana in the 1965 NCAA College Division football season as a member of the Big Sky Conference (Big Sky). The Grizzlies were led by second-year head coach Hugh Davidson, played their home games at Dornblaser Field and finished the season with a record of four wins and six losses (4–6, 2–2 Big Sky).

== Schedule ==
Date	Opponent	Site	Result	Attendance	Source
September 11	at Utah*	Ute Stadium; Salt Lake City, UT	L 13–28	13,431	
September 18	vs. South Dakota*	Daylis Stadium; Billings, MT	L 14–15	4,500–5,500	
October 2	Idaho State	Dornblaser Field; Missoula, MT	W 16–0	6,200	
October 9	at Weber State	Wildcat Stadium; Ogden, UT	W 15–14	7,867	
October 16	at Utah State*	Romney Stadium; Logan, UT	L 21–54	11,853	
October 23	Idaho	Dornblaser Field; Missoula, MT (rivalry)	L 7–35	7,100	
October 30	Pacific (CA)*	Dornblaser Field; Missoula, MT	W 13–7	7,790–7,900	
November 6	at Montana State	Gatton Field; Bozeman, MT (rivalry)	L 7–24	9,000	
November 13	at Western Michigan*	Waldo Stadium; Kalamazoo, MI	L 14–17	9,000	
November 25	at Portland State*	Multnomah Stadium; Portland, OR	W 33–7	3,018	
*Non-conference game
