= 1963 South Dakota State Jackrabbits football team =

American college football season

1963 South Dakota State Jackrabbits football

NCC champion
- Conference: North Central Conference
- Record: 9–1 (6–0 NCC)
- Head coach: Ralph Ginn (17th season)
- Captains: Wayne Rasmussen; Jerry Ochs

1963 North Central Conference football standings
| | Conf. | | | | | Overall |
| Team | W | | L | | T | W | | L | | T |
|---|---|---|---|---|---|---|---|---|---|---|
| South Dakota State $ | 6 | – | 0 | – | 0 | 9 | – | 1 | – | 0 |
| North Dakota | 4 | – | 2 | – | 0 | 6 | – | 3 | – | 0 |
| State College of Iowa | 4 | – | 2 | – | 0 | 5 | – | 3 | – | 1 |
| North Dakota State | 3 | – | 3 | – | 0 | 3 | – | 5 | – | 0 |
| Augustana (SD) | 2 | – | 4 | – | 0 | 2 | – | 8 | – | 0 |
| Morningside | 1 | – | 5 | – | 0 | 3 | – | 5 | – | 0 |
| South Dakota | 1 | – | 5 | – | 0 | 1 | – | 7 | – | 0 |
$ – Conference champion

The 1963 South Dakota State Jackrabbits football team was an American football team that represented South Dakota State University in the North Central Conference (NCC) during the 1963 NCAA College Division football season. In its 17th season under head coach Ralph Ginn, the team compiled a 9–1 record, won the NCC championship, and outscored opponents by a total of 278 to 166.

The team's statistical leaders included Gale Douglas with 621 rushing yards and quarterback Ron Meyer with 1,091 passing yards. Halfback Wayne Rasmussen was selected as the NCC's Most Valuable Players. Other key players included ends Darrel Tramp and Ed Maras, tackle Dave Westbrock, center Jerry Ochs, and halfback Wayne Rasmussen.

== Schedule ==
| Date | Time | Opponent | Rank | Site | Result | Attendance | Source |
|---|---|---|---|---|---|---|---|
| September 14 | 9:00 p.m. | vs. Montana State* | | Memorial Stadium; Great Falls, MT | W 9–6 | 6,000–6,500 | |
| September 21 | | at Nebraska* | | Memorial Stadium; Lincoln, NE | L 7–58 | 31,000–34,493 | |
| September 28 | | Colorado State–Greeley* | | Brookings, SD | W 54–14 | 3,000 | |
| October 5 | | at Augustana (SD) | | Sioux Falls, SD | W 28–8 | 6,000 | |
| October 12 | | North Dakota | | Grand Forks, ND | W 7–6 | 9,000–10,059 | |
| October 19 | | South Dakota | | Brookings, SD (rivalry) | W 61–0 | 8,500 | |
| October 26 | | North Dakota State | No. 7 | Brookings, SD (rivlary) | W 40–25 | 4,500 | |
| November 2 | | State College of Iowa | No. 5 | Brookings, SD | W 27–13 | 4,000 | |
| November 9 | | at Morningside | No. 5 | Sioux City, IA | W 28–22 | 2,500 | |
| November 16 | | at Arkansas State* | No. T–5 | Jonesboro, AR | W 17–14 | 3,000 | |
*Non-conference game; Rankings from AP Poll released prior to the game; All times are in Central time
