= 1963 New Mexico Lobos football team =

American college football season

1963 New Mexico Lobos football

WAC champion
- Conference: Western Athletic Conference
- Record: 6–4 (3–1 WAC)
- Head coach: Bill Weeks (4th season)
- Home stadium: University Stadium

1963 Western Athletic Conference football standings
	Conf.					Overall
Team	W		L		T	W		L		T
Arizona State *	3	–	0	–	0	8	–	1	–	0
New Mexico $	3	–	1	–	0	6	–	4	–	0
Arizona	2	–	2	–	0	5	–	5	–	0
Utah	2	–	2	–	0	4	–	6	–	0
Wyoming	2	–	3	–	0	6	–	4	–	0
BYU	0	–	4	–	0	2	–	8	–	0
$ – Conference champion; * – Ineligible for conference title due to playing fewer than qualifying number of games

The 1963 New Mexico Lobos football team represented the University of New Mexico in the Western Athletic Conference (WAC) during the 1963 NCAA University Division football season. In their fourth season under head coach Bill Weeks, the Lobos compiled a 6–4 record (3–1 against WAC opponents), winning the WAC title (due to ASU playing only 3 conference games, which was fewer than the qualifying amount), and outscored opponents, 177 to 143.

The team's statistical leaders included Stan Quintana with 221 passing yards, Bucky Stallings with 553 rushing yards, and Claude Ward with 181 receiving yards.

== Schedule ==
Date	Opponent	Site	Result	Attendance	Source
September 28	Texas Western*	University Stadium; Albuquerque, NM	W 23–7	26,836	
October 5	Utah	University Stadium; Albuquerque, NM	L 6–19	20,026	
October 12	at Utah State*	Romney Stadium; Logan, UT	L 14–47	9,021	
October 19	at New Mexico State*	Memorial Stadium; Las Cruces, NM (rivalry)	L 12–13	12,491	
October 26	Montana*	University Stadium; Albuquerque, NM	W 24–6	21,500	
November 2	at Colorado State*	Colorado Field; Fort Collins, CO	W 25–0	7,500	
November 9	Wyoming	University Stadium; Albuquerque, NM	W 17–6	18,769	
November 16	Air Force*^{†}	University Stadium; Albuquerque, NM	L 8–30	29,004	
November 30	BYU	University Stadium; Albuquerque, NM	W 26–0	14,851	
December 7	at Arizona	Arizona Stadium; Tucson, AZ (rivalry)	W 22–15	17,000	
*Non-conference game; ^{†}Homecoming
