= Wally Nalder =

American football player and coach (1927–2010)

Wallace Nalder
Biographical details
- Born: February 24, 1927; Layton, Utah, U.S.
- Died: June 30, 2010 (aged 83); Bountiful, Utah, U.S.

Playing career
- 1947–1949: Utah
- Position: Guard

Coaching career (HC unless noted)
- 1950: Star Valley HS (WY)
- 1951–1954: Eastern Arizona
- 1955: BYU (assistant)
- 1956–1964: Weber / Weber State

Head coaching record
- Overall: 13–13 (college)

Accomplishments and honors

Championships
- 1 ICAC (1959)

Wallace Kenley Nalder (February 24, 1927 – June 30, 2010) was an American football player and coach. He served as the head football coach at Weber State University–then known as Weber College–from 1956 to 1964. The final three years of his tenure were Weber's first as a full, four-year college football program. He played collegiately at the University of Utah from 1947 to 1949.

== Head coaching record ==
=== College ===
Year	Team	Overall	Conference	Standing	Bowl/playoffs
Weber State Wildcats (NCAA College Division independent) (1962–1964)
1962	Weber State	5–4			
Weber State Wildcats (Big Sky Conference) (1963–1964)
1963	Weber State	6–3	1–2	4th	
1964	Weber State	2–6	0–3	4th	
Weber State:		13–13	1–5		
Total:		13–13			

=== Junior college ===
Year	Team	Overall	Conference	Standing	Bowl/playoffs
Weber Wildcats (Intermountain Collegiate Athletic Conference) (1956–1961)
1956	Weber		1–2	5th	
1957	Weber		2–3	T–5th	
1958	Weber	4–6	2–3	6th	
1959	Weber	6–3	4–1	1st	
1960	Weber	6–4	4–2	2nd	
1961	Weber	7–2–1	4–1–1	2nd	
Weber:			17–12–1		
Total:					
National championship Conference title Conference division title or championship game berth
