= Ron Porter =

American football player (1945–2019)

No. 55, 50, 52
- Position: Linebacker

Personal information
- Born: July 27, 1945; Woburn, Massachusetts, U.S.
- Died: December 4, 2019 (aged 74); Gainesville, Florida, U.S.
- Listed height: 6 ft 3 in (1.91 m)
- Listed weight: 232 lb (105 kg)

Career information
- High school: Yuba City (CA)
- College: Idaho
- NFL draft: 1967: 5th round, 126th overall pick

Career history
- Baltimore Colts (1967–1969); Philadelphia Eagles (1969–1972); Minnesota Vikings (1973)

Awards and highlights
- NFL champion (1968)

Career NFL statistics
- Fumble recoveries: 11
- Interceptions: 3
- Sacks: 4
- Stats at Pro Football Reference

Ronald Dean Porter (July 27, 1945 – December 4, 2019) was an American professional football player who played linebacker for seven seasons in the National Football League (NFL) for the Baltimore Colts, Philadelphia Eagles, and Minnesota Vikings.

Porter graduated from Yuba City High School in 1963 and played college football at the University of Idaho in Moscow. He was a member of Phi Gamma Delta fraternity and majored in marketing.

Porter was a fifth round selection of the Colts in the 1967 NFL/AFL draft, the 126th overall pick. He was a member of the 1968 Colts team that won the NFL Championship, but were upset in Super Bowl III.
