= LaVerle Pratt =

American gridiron football player (born 1943)

No. 54 / 33
- Position: Linebacker

Personal information
- Born: June 22, 1943 (age 83)

Career information
- College: Idaho
- NFL draft: 1966: 14th round, 210th overall pick
- AFL draft: 1966: Red Shirt 4th round, 35th overall pick

Career history
- 1968: Ottawa Rough Riders
- 1969: Spokane Shockers
- 1970: Winnipeg Blue Bombers

Awards and highlights
- Grey Cup champion (1968)

LaVerle Pratt (born June 22, 1943) is a former linebacker who played in the Canadian Football League (CFL).

After playing college football at University of Idaho, Pratt was chosen 210th overall by the St.Louis Cardinals in the 1966 NFL draft.

Pratt first played professional football in the Canadian Football League with the Grey Cup champion Ottawa Rough Riders. He suited up for 4 games and returned 1 kickoff for 5 yards. After a season in the Continental Football League (COFL) with the Spokane Shockers, he was picked up by the Winnipeg Blue Bombers in 1970, where he played 5 games.

After his football career he taught at Kennewick High School, in Kennewick, Washington and now resides in Elk City, Idaho.
