= 1965 NAIA football season =

American college football season

- Regular season: August–November 1965
- Postseason: November 27– December 11, 1965
- National Championship: ARC Stadium; Augusta, GA
- Champion: Saint John's (MN) (2)

The 1965 NAIA football season was the tenth season of college football sponsored by the NAIA.

The season was played from August to November 1965, culminating in the 1965 NAIA Championship Bowl, played this year again at ARC Stadium in Augusta, Georgia.

Saint John's (MN) defeated Linfield in the Championship Bowl, 33–0, to win their second NAIA national title.

== Conference realignment ==
=== Membership changes ===
Team	1964 conference	1965 conference
Portland State	Oregon Collegiate Conference	NCAA College Division independent

== Conference standings ==
1965 Arkansas Intercollegiate Conference football standings
	Conf.					Overall
Team	W		L		T	W		L		T
Arkansas State Teachers +	5	–	1	–	1	7	–	1	–	1
Arkansas A&M +	5	–	1	–	1	7	–	2	–	1
Arkansas Tech	5	–	2	–	0	7	–	3	–	0
Harding	3	–	3	–	1	5	–	3	–	1
Ouachita Baptist	3	–	3	–	1	5	–	4	–	1
Southern Arkansas	3	–	4	–	0	4	–	6	–	0
Henderson State	2	–	5	–	0	4	–	6	–	0
Ozarks	0	–	7	–	0	0	–	8	–	0
+ – Conference co-champions

1965 Carolinas Conference football standings
	Conf.					Overall
Team	W		L		T	W		L		T
Lenoir Rhyne $	6	–	0	–	0	7	–	3	–	0
Guilford	3	–	1	–	0	8	–	2	–	0
Western Carolina	5	–	2	–	0	7	–	2	–	0
Catawba	3	–	3	–	0	7	–	3	–	0
Appalachian State	3	–	3	–	0	5	–	5	–	0
Newberry	3	–	4	–	0	3	–	7	–	0
Presbyterian	1	–	4	–	0	5	–	5	–	0
Elon	0	–	7	–	0	2	–	8	–	0
$ – Conference champion

1965 Central Intercollegiate Athletic Association football standings
	Conf.					Overall
Team	W		L		T	W		L		T
No. 3 Morgan State $	8	–	0	–	0	9	–	0	–	0
Johnson C. Smith	5	–	1	–	0	5	–	4	–	0
Maryland State	5	–	1	–	0	5	–	2	–	0
St. Augustine's	6	–	1	–	1	8	–	1	–	1
North Carolina A&T	4	–	3	–	0	4	–	6	–	0
Delaware State	3	–	3	–	0	4	–	5	–	0
Virginia State	5	–	4	–	0	5	–	4	–	0
Saint Paul's (VA)	4	–	3	–	0	5	–	3	–	0
North Carolina College	3	–	4	–	1	3	–	5	–	1
Howard	2	–	3	–	0	5	–	3	–	0
Norfolk State	4	–	4	–	0	4	–	4	–	0
Virginia Union	3	–	5	–	0	3	–	5	–	0
Livingstone	3	–	5	–	0	3	–	5	–	0
Shaw	4	–	5	–	0	4	–	5	–	0
Elizabeth City State	3	–	5	–	0	3	–	5	–	0
Winston-Salem State	2	–	6	–	0	2	–	7	–	0
Fayetteville State	1	–	5	–	0	1	–	6	–	0
Hampton	0	–	7	–	0	1	–	8	–	0
$ – Conference champion; Rankings from NAIA poll

1965 Central Intercollegiate Conference football standings
	Conf.					Overall
Team	W		L		T	W		L		T
No. 12 Omaha $	4	–	0	–	0	8	–	1	–	0
Fort Hays State	3	–	1	–	0	6	–	3	–	0
Pittsburg State	2	–	2	–	0	3	–	6	–	0
Washburn	1	–	3	–	0	2	–	6	–	1
Emporia State	0	–	4	–	0	1	–	8	–	0
$ – Conference champion; Rankings from NAIA poll

1965 College Conference of Illinois football standings
	Conf.					Overall
Team	W		L		T	W		L		T
No. 7 Illinois Wesleyan $	6	–	0	–	0	8	–	0	–	0
Carthage	5	–	1	–	0	6	–	2	–	0
North Central (IL)	3	–	3	–	0	5	–	3	–	0
Augustana (IL)	2	–	2	–	2	4	–	2	–	2
Carroll (WI)	1	–	4	–	1	3	–	4	–	1
Millikin	1	–	4	–	1	2	–	5	–	1
North Park	1	–	5	–	0	2	–	6	–	0
$ – Conference champion; Rankings from NAIA poll

1965 Eastern Football Conference football standings
	Conf.					Overall
Team	W		L		T	W		L		T
Southern Connecticut State $	5	–	0	–	0	7	–	3	–	0
Central Connecticut State	3	–	1	–	0	7	–	1	–	0
Montclair State	3	–	1	–	0	4	–	4	–	0
Bridgeport	1	–	3	–	0	3	–	6	–	0
Trenton State	1	–	4	–	0	1	–	8	–	0
Glassboro State	0	–	4	–	0	0	–	8	–	0
$ – Conference champion

1965 Evergreen Conference football standings
	Conf.					Overall
Team	W		L		T	W		L		T
No. 10 Eastern Washington $	4	–	1	–	0	8	–	1	–	0
Whitworth	3	–	2	–	0	5	–	3	–	0
Western Washington	2	–	2	–	1	4	–	4	–	1
Central Washington	1	–	3	–	1	3	–	4	–	1
Puget Sound	0	–	2	–	2	0	–	5	–	3
$ – Conference champion; Rankings from NAIA poll

1965 Gateway Conference football standings
	Conf.					Overall
Team	W		L		T	W		L		T
Northwestern (WI) $	4	–	0	–	0	6	–	1	–	0
Milton	3	–	1	–	0	4	–	3	–	0
Lakeland	2	–	2	–	0	5	–	3	–	0
Illinois–Chicago	1	–	3	–	0	1	–	7	–	0
Eureka	0	–	4	–	0	1	–	7	–	0
$ – Conference champion

1965 Gulf States Conference football standings
	Conf.					Overall
Team	W		L		T	W		L		T
Southwestern Louisiana +	4	–	1	–	0	6	–	3	–	0
McNeese State +	4	–	1	–	0	5	–	4	–	0
Louisiana Tech	3	–	2	–	0	4	–	4	–	0
Northwestern State	2	–	3	–	0	5	–	3	–	0
Southeastern Louisiana	2	–	3	–	0	5	–	4	–	0
Northeast Louisiana State	0	–	5	–	0	1	–	8	–	0
+ – Conference co-champions

1965 Iowa Conference football standings
	Conf.					Overall
Team	W		L		T	W		L		T
No. 16 Central (IA) $	7	–	0	–	0	8	–	1	–	0
Luther	6	–	1	–	0	6	–	3	–	0
Dubuque	5	–	2	–	0	6	–	2	–	1
Buena Vista	4	–	3	–	0	6	–	3	–	0
Upper Iowa	3	–	4	–	0	4	–	5	–	0
Simpson (IA)	2	–	5	–	0	3	–	6	–	0
Wartburg	1	–	6	–	0	2	–	7	–	0
William Penn	0	–	7	–	0	1	–	8	–	0
$ – Conference champion; Rankings from NAIA poll

1965 Kansas Collegiate Athletic Conference football standings
	Conf.					Overall
Team	W		L		T	W		L		T
No. 5 Ottawa $	9	–	0	–	0	9	–	0	–	0
Bethany (KS)	7	–	2	–	0	7	–	2	–	0
Baker	6	–	3	–	0	6	–	3	–	0
College of Emporia	5	–	3	–	1	5	–	3	–	1
Southwestern (KS)	5	–	3	–	1	5	–	3	–	1
Friends	4	–	5	–	0	4	–	5	–	0
Kansas Wesleyan	3	–	6	–	0	3	–	6	–	0
Sterling	3	–	6	–	0	3	–	6	–	0
McPherson	2	–	7	–	0	2	–	7	–	0
Bethel (KS)	0	–	9	–	0	0	–	9	–	0
$ – Conference champion; Rankings from NAIA poll

1965 Lone Star Conference football standings
	Conf.					Overall
Team	W		L		T	W		L		T
No. 2 Sul Ross $^	6	–	0	–	0	10	–	1	–	0
Southwest Texas State	4	–	2	–	0	8	–	2	–	0
Stephen F. Austin	4	–	2	–	0	6	–	3	–	0
Texas A&I	4	–	2	–	0	6	–	3	–	0
East Texas State	2	–	4	–	0	4	–	5	–	0
Sam Houston State	1	–	4	–	0	4	–	6	–	0
Howard Payne	0	–	6	–	0	2	–	8	–	0
McMurry	0	–	0	–	0	4	–	5	–	1
$ – Conference champion; ^ – NAIA playoff participant; Rankings from NAIA poll

1965 Mid-Ohio Conference football standings
	Conf.					Overall
Team	W		L		T	W		L		T
Ashland $	3	–	0	–	0	7	–	1	–	1
Bluffton	2	–	1	–	0	7	–	2	–	0
Defiance	1	–	2	–	0	3	–	4	–	0
Wilmington (OH)	0	–	3	–	0	0	–	7	–	1
$ – Conference champion

1965 Midwest Conference football standings
	Conf.					Overall
Team	W		L		T	W		L		T
Ripon $	7	–	1	–	0	7	–	1	–	0
Grinnell	6	–	2	–	0	6	–	2	–	0
Beloit	5	–	3	–	0	5	–	3	–	0
Lawrence	5	–	3	–	0	5	–	3	–	0
St. Olaf	5	–	3	–	0	5	–	3	–	0
Coe	4	–	4	–	0	4	–	4	–	0
Carleton	3	–	5	–	0	3	–	5	–	0
Cornell (IA)	2	–	6	–	0	2	–	6	–	0
Monmouth (IL)	2	–	6	–	0	2	–	6	–	0
Knox	1	–	7	–	0	1	–	7	–	0
$ – Conference champion

1965 Minnesota Intercollegiate Athletic Conference football standings
	Conf.					Overall
Team	W		L		T	W		L		T
No. 1 Saint John's (MN) $^	7	–	0	–	0	11	–	0	–	0
No. 19 Concordia (MN)	5	–	2	–	0	6	–	2	–	0
St. Thomas (MN)	4	–	2	–	1	4	–	4	–	1
Gustavus Adolphus	4	–	3	–	0	5	–	4	–	0
Minnesota–Duluth	3	–	4	–	0	4	–	5	–	0
Augsburg	2	–	4	–	1	3	–	5	–	1
Hamline	2	–	5	–	0	3	–	6	–	0
Macalester	0	–	7	–	0	0	–	8	–	0
$ – Conference champion; ^ – NAIA playoff participant; Rankings from NAIA poll

1965 Missouri College Athletic Union football standings
	Conf.					Overall
Team	W		L		T	W		L		T
William Jewell $	4	–	0	–	0	7	–	2	–	0
Missouri Valley	3	–	1	–	0	4	–	5	–	0
Central Methodist	2	–	1	–	0	4	–	4	–	0
Graceland	2	–	3	–	0	3	–	6	–	0
Tarkio	1	–	3	–	0	3	–	6	–	0
Culver–Stockton	0	–	4	–	0	1	–	7	–	0
$ – Conference champion

1965 Montana Collegiate Conference football standings
	Conf.					Overall
Team	W		L		T	W		L		T
Upper Division
Eastern Montana x$	5	–	0	–	0	6	–	2	–	0
Carroll (MT)	3	–	2	–	0	6	–	2	–	0
Western Montana	1	–	4	–	0	2	–	5	–	1
Lower Division
Northern Montana x	4	–	1	–	0	?	–	?	–	?
Montana Tech	1	–	4	–	0	?	–	?	–	?
Rocky Mountain	1	–	4	–	0	?	–	?	–	?
$ – Conference champion; x – Division champion/co-champions

1965 Nebraska College Conference football standings
	Conf.					Overall
Team	W		L		T	W		L		T
Kearney State +	3	–	1	–	0	7	–	2	–	0
Wayne State (NE) +	3	–	1	–	0	6	–	4	–	0
Peru State +	3	–	1	–	0	4	–	5	–	0
Hastings	1	–	3	–	0	4	–	6	–	0
Chadron State	0	–	4	–	0	2	–	6	–	1
+ – Conference co-champions

1965 North Dakota College Athletic Conference football standings
	Conf.					Overall
Team	W		L		T	W		L		T
No. 17 Mayville State $	6	–	0	–	0	7	–	1	–	0
Dickinson State	5	–	1	–	0	6	–	2	–	0
Minot State	4	–	2	–	0	5	–	2	–	1
Valley City State	3	–	3	–	0	3	–	5	–	0
Jamestown	2	–	4	–	0	2	–	6	–	0
Wahpeton Science	0	–	5	–	1	2	–	5	–	1
Ellendale	0	–	5	–	1	1	–	6	–	1
$ – Conference champion; Rankings from NAIA poll

1965 Northern Intercollegiate Conference football standings
	Conf.					Overall
Team	W		L		T	W		L		T
Michigan Tech $	4	–	1	–	0	6	–	2	–	0
Winona State	3	–	2	–	0	6	–	2	–	0
Mankato State	3	–	2	–	0	5	–	3	–	1
Bemidji State	3	–	2	–	0	4	–	4	–	0
Moorhead State	2	–	3	–	0	5	–	4	–	0
St. Cloud State	0	–	5	–	0	2	–	6	–	1
$ – Conference champion

1965 Northwest Conference football standings
	Conf.					Overall
Team	W		L		T	W		L		T
No. 9 Linfield $^	5	–	0	–	0	8	–	2	–	0
Willamette	4	–	1	–	0	6	–	1	–	1
Pacific (OR)	2	–	3	–	0	5	–	3	–	0
College of Idaho	2	–	3	–	0	2	–	6	–	0
Lewis & Clark	1	–	4	–	0	3	–	5	–	0
Whitman	1	–	4	–	0	2	–	6	–	0
Pacific Lutheran			–			4	–	5	–	0
$ – Conference champion; ^ – NAIA playoff participant; Rankings from NAIA poll

1965 Oklahoma Collegiate Conference football standings
	Conf.					Overall
Team	W		L		T	W		L		T
No. 4 East Central $	7	–	0	–	0	9	–	1	–	0
Northeastern State	5	–	1	–	1	7	–	1	–	1
Central State (OK)	5	–	1	–	1	6	–	3	–	1
Langston	3	–	4	–	0	5	–	4	–	0
SW Oklahoma State	3	–	4	–	0	5	–	5	–	0
Panhandle A&M	3	–	4	–	0	3	–	6	–	0
NW Oklahoma State	1	–	6	–	0	3	–	7	–	0
SE Oklahoma State	0	–	7	–	0	1	–	8	–	0
$ – Conference champion; Rankings from NAIA poll

1965 Oregon Collegiate Conference football standings
	Conf.					Overall
Team	W		L		T	W		L		T
Southern Oregon $	4	–	0	–	0	5	–	3	–	1
Oregon College	2	–	2	–	0	5	–	3	–	1
Eastern Oregon	2	–	2	–	0	3	–	6	–	1
Oregon Tech	2	–	2	–	0	2	–	5	–	0
George Fox	0	–	4	–	0	0	–	8	–	0
$ – Conference champion

1965 Pennsylvania State College Athletic Conference football standings
	Conf.					Overall
Team	W		L		T	W		L		T
East Division
No. 8/10 East Stroudsburg xy$	6	–	0	–	0	10	–	0	–	0
West Chester	5	–	1	–	0	5	–	3	–	0
Mansfield	4	–	2	–	0	4	–	5	–	0
Bloomsburg	3	–	3	–	0	4	–	4	–	0
Millersville	2	–	4	–	0	4	–	4	–	0
Cheyney	1	–	5	–	0	2	–	5	–	0
Kutztown	0	–	6	–	0	1	–	7	–	0
West Division
Indiana (PA) xy	5	–	1	–	0	7	–	3	–	0
Clarion	4	–	1	–	1	6	–	2	–	1
California (PA)	4	–	2	–	0	5	–	3	–	0
Lock Haven	3	–	3	–	0	5	–	3	–	0
Slippery Rock	2	–	3	–	1	4	–	3	–	1
Shippensburg	2	–	4	–	0	3	–	5	–	0
Edinboro *	0	–	6	–	0	6	–	2	–	1
Championship: East Stroudsburg 26, Indiana (PA) 10
$ – Conference champion; x – Division champion/co-champions; y – Championship game participant; * – Edinboro forfeited four conference victories—over IUP, Clarion, Shippensburg, and California—but NCAA and Edinboro records do not reflect the forfeits in the team's overall record.; Rankings from NAIA poll and AP small college poll

1965 South Dakota Intercollegiate Conference football standings
	Conf.					Overall
Team	W		L		T	W		L		T
Northern State $	5	–	1	–	0	5	–	4	–	0
Dakota Wesleyan	4	–	2	–	0	7	–	2	–	0
General Beadle	4	–	2	–	0	6	–	3	–	0
Black Hills State	3	–	3	–	0	5	–	3	–	0
Huron	3	–	3	–	0	5	–	4	–	0
South Dakota Tech	1	–	5	–	0	3	–	5	–	0
Southern State (SD)	1	–	5	–	0	1	–	7	–	0
$ – Conference champion

1965 Southern California Intercollegiate Athletic Conference football standings
	Conf.					Overall
Team	W		L		T	W		L		T
No. 11 Occidental $	5	–	0	–	0	8	–	1	–	0
Pomona	3	–	2	–	0	5	–	5	–	0
Whittier	2	–	2	–	0	4	–	5	–	0
Redlands	2	–	2	–	0	4	–	6	–	0
Claremont-Mudd	1	–	3	–	0	2	–	7	–	0
Caltech	0	–	4	–	0	0	–	7	–	0
$ – Conference champion; Rankings from NAIA poll

1965 Southwestern Athletic Conference football standings
	Conf.					Overall
Team	W		L		T	W		L		T
No. 13 Grambling $	6	–	1	–	0	8	–	3	–	0
Southern	4	–	2	–	1	5	–	4	–	1
Texas Southern	4	–	2	–	1	5	–	4	–	1
Jackson State	3	–	3	–	1	5	–	3	–	1
Prairie View A&M	3	–	3	–	1	5	–	3	–	1
Arkansas AM&N	3	–	3	–	1	4	–	5	–	1
Alcorn A&M	2	–	4	–	1	3	–	5	–	1
Wiley	0	–	7	–	0	1	–	7	–	0
$ – Conference champion; Rankings from UPI small college poll

1965 Tri-State Conference football standings
	Conf.					Overall
Team	W		L		T	W		L		T
Westmar +	5	–	1	–	0	7	–	1	–	1
Midland +	5	–	1	–	0	6	–	2	–	0
Yankton	4	–	2	–	0	7	–	2	–	0
Concordia (NE)	3	–	3	–	0	6	–	3	–	0
Dana	2	–	4	–	0	2	–	6	–	0
Northwestern (IA)	1	–	5	–	0	2	–	6	–	0
Sioux Falls	1	–	5	–	0	2	–	7	–	0
+ – Conference co-champions

1965 West Penn Conference football standings
	Conf.					Overall
Team	W		L		T	W		L		T
Waynesburg $	2	–	0	–	1	6	–	2	–	1
Westminster (PA)	2	–	1	–	0	5	–	3	–	0
Grove City	1	–	1	–	1	4	–	4	–	1
Geneva	0	–	3	–	0	3	–	5	–	0
$ – Conference champion

1965 West Virginia Intercollegiate Athletic Conference football standings
	Conf.					Overall
Team	W		L		T	W		L		T
No. 6 Fairmont State $^	7	–	0	–	0	8	–	1	–	0
Bluefield State	3	–	1	–	1	6	–	1	–	1
West Virginia Wesleyan	3	–	2	–	0	6	–	3	–	0
West Virginia Tech	5	–	3	–	0	5	–	3	–	0
West Liberty State	3	–	2	–	2	4	–	2	–	2
Concord	3	–	4	–	0	4	–	5	–	0
Glenville State	2	–	5	–	0	2	–	6	–	0
Salem	1	–	4	–	2	1	–	5	–	2
West Virginia State	1	–	4	–	1	1	–	6	–	1
Shepherd *	0	–	3	–	0	2	–	5	–	0
$ – Conference champion; ^ – NAIA playoff participant * – Did not qualify for conference standings Conference standings based on power ratings; Rankings from NAIA poll

1965 Wisconsin State University Conference football standings
	Conf.					Overall
Team	W		L		T	W		L		T
Stout State $	6	–	0	–	0	7	–	1	–	1
Whitewater State	4	–	1	–	1	7	–	2	–	1
La Crosse State	4	–	1	–	1	5	–	3	–	1
Stevens Point State	4	–	2	–	0	6	–	3	–	0
River Falls State	3	–	2	–	2	4	–	3	–	2
Oshkosh State	3	–	4	–	0	5	–	4	–	0
Eau Claire State	2	–	6	–	0	2	–	6	–	0
Platteville State	1	–	5	–	0	2	–	6	–	1
Superior State	0	–	6	–	0	0	–	9	–	0
$ – Conference champion

1965 NAIA independents football records
	Conf.			Overall
Team	W	L	T	W		L		T
Georgetown (KY)		–		9	–	0	–	0
No. 15 Cal Lutheran		–		8	–	1	–	0
No. 18 Southern Colorado State		–		8	–	1	–	1
No. 20 Austin		–		7	–	2	–	0
Earlham		–		7	–	2	–	0
No. 13 Findlay		–		7	–	2	–	0
No. 14 Northern Michigan		–		7	–	3	–	0
Hillsdale		–		6	–	3	–	0
La Verne		–		5	–	3	–	0
Carson–Newman		–		5	–	4	–	0
New Mexico Highlands		–		5	–	4	–	0
Wofford		–		5	–	4	–	0
Westminster (UT)		–		3	–	3	–	0
McMurry		–		4	–	5	–	1
Simon Fraser		–		2	–	3	–	0
Doane		–		3	–	6	–	0
Oklahoma Panhandle State		–		3	–	6	–	0
Eastern New Mexico		–		2	–	6	–	1
Azusa Pacific		–		1	–	6	–	0
Iowa Wesleyan		–		1	–	7	–	0
Wheaton (IL)		–		1	–	8	–	0
St. Mary of the Plains		–		0	–	9	–	0
Rankings from NAIA poll

== Postseason ==
=== Bracket ===
Semifinals; November 27, 1965
Fairmont State	7
Saint John's (MN)*	28
Linfield	30
Sul Ross*	27

Championship; December 11, 1965; Augusta, GA
Saint John's (MN)	33
Linfield	0

=== Championship game outstanding players ===
- Back: Stan Suchta, Saint John's (MN)
- Lineman: Fred Cremer, Saint John's (MN)

== See also ==
- 1965 NCAA University Division football season
- 1965 NCAA College Division football season
