= Lorne Davies =

American and Canadian football coach

Biographical details
- Born: August 6, 1930; Vancouver, British Columbia, Canada
- Died: February 27, 2015 (aged 84)
- Education: Western Washington

Coaching career (HC unless noted)
- ?–1964: UBC
- 1965–1972: Simon Fraser

Head coaching record
- Overall: 37–27–1

Accomplishments and honors

Awards
- SFU Hall of Fame (1986); WWU Hall of Fame (1995); Burnaby Hall of Fame (2009)

Lorne Davies (August 6, 1930 – February 27, 2015) was an American football and Canadian football coach. He served as the head football coach at Simon Fraser University from 1965 to 1972 where he was that program's inaugural coach and achieved a record of 37–27–1.

Davies also served as the athletic director at Simon Fraser where he designed and implemented Canada’s first university athletic scholarship programs, promoted female participation in a male-dominated arena, and enabled student-athletes to compete in the United States while receiving a first-rate Canadian university education.

Under Davies' guidance, SFU was the first Canadian institution accepted into the NAIA, allowing SFU athletes further opportunities to compete.

== Head coaching record ==
Year	Team	Overall	Conference	Standing	Bowl/playoffs	D2^{#}
Simon Fraser Clan (NAIA independent) (1965–1969)
1965	Simon Fraser	2–3				
1966	Simon Fraser	5–3				
1967	Simon Fraser	6–2				
1968	Simon Fraser	4–5				
1969	Simon Fraser	1–6–1				
Simon Fraser Clan (NAIA Division II independent) (1970–1972)
1970	Simon Fraser	8–0				6
1971	Simon Fraser	7–3				
1972	Simon Fraser	4–5				
Simon Fraser:		37–27–1				
Total:		37–27–1				
