= Don Larson =

Don Larson may refer to:

- Donald A. Larson (1915 or 1917 – 1944), American fighter pilot and World War II flying ace
- Don Larson (American football) (c. 1926 – 1994), American college football coach

== See also ==
- Don Larsen (1929–2020), American baseball pitcher
