= 1965 college football season =

1965 college football season may refer to:

- 1965 NCAA University Division football season
- 1965 NCAA College Division football season
- 1965 NAIA football season
