= Don Larson (American football) =

American football coach

Biographical details
- Born: c. 1926; Princeton, Illinois, U.S.
- Died: November 29, 1994; Normal, Illinois, U.S.

Playing career

Football
- 1946–1949: Illinois Wesleyan

Coaching career (HC unless noted)

Football
- 1954–1986: Illinois Wesleyan

Head coaching record
- Overall: 166–121–6 (football)

Accomplishments and honors

Championships
- Football; 5 CCI/CCIW (1964, 1965, 1974, 1977, 1980)

Awards
- Football; CCIW Coach of the Year (1977, 1980); 6× NAIA District 20 Coach of the Year

Don "Swede" Larson (c. 1926 – November 29, 1994) was an American college football coach. He was the head football coach at Illinois Wesleyan University in Bloomington, Illinois, for 33 years from 1954 to 1986. He compiled a career record of 166–121–6 and led the team to conference championships in 1964 and 1965, and conference co-championships in 1974, 1977, and 1980. He was selected as the College Conference of Illinois and Wisconsin Coach Of The Year in 1977 and 1980. He also played football at Illinois Wesleyan and was captain of the 1949 Illinois Wesleyan football team. He also coached the tennis, track, golf, and swimming teams at Illinois Wesleyan.

== Head coaching record ==
=== Football ===
Year	Team	Overall	Conference	Standing	Bowl/playoffs
Illinois Wesleyan Titans (College Conference of Illinois / College Conference of Illinois and Wisconsin) (1954–1986)
1954	Illinois Wesleyan	5–3	4–1	3rd	
1955	Illinois Wesleyan	6–3	5–1	2nd	
1956	Illinois Wesleyan	3–5–1	3–3–1	T–4th	
1957	Illinois Wesleyan	1–7–1	1–5–1	7th	
1958	Illinois Wesleyan	4–4	4–3	T–4th	
1959	Illinois Wesleyan	6–3	5–2	2nd	
1960	Illinois Wesleyan	7–2	3–2	T–2nd	
1961	Illinois Wesleyan	2–7	1–5	6th	
1962	Illinois Wesleyan	4–5	4–3	T–3rd	
1963	Illinois Wesleyan	6–3	4–2	T–2nd	
1964	Illinois Wesleyan	7–1–1	5–0–1	1st	
1965	Illinois Wesleyan	8–0	6–0	1st	
1966	Illinois Wesleyan	5–3	4–2	T–2nd	
1967	Illinois Wesleyan	7–2	5–1	2nd	
1968	Illinois Wesleyan	6–3	5–2	T–2nd	
1969	Illinois Wesleyan	3–6	3–4	T–4th	
1970	Illinois Wesleyan	5–3–1	5–2–1	3rd	
1971	Illinois Wesleyan	5–4	5–3	T–2nd	
1972	Illinois Wesleyan	4–5	4–4	6th	
1973	Illinois Wesleyan	5–4	5–3	4th	
1974	Illinois Wesleyan	8–1	7–1	T–1st	
1975	Illinois Wesleyan	4–4–1	4–3–1	6th	
1976	Illinois Wesleyan	6–3	5–3	T–3rd	
1977	Illinois Wesleyan	6–3	6–2	T–1st	
1978	Illinois Wesleyan	4–5	3–5	T–6th	
1979	Illinois Wesleyan	7–2	6–2	T–2nd	
1980	Illinois Wesleyan	7–2	6–2	T–1st	
1981	Illinois Wesleyan	3–6	3–5	T–4th	
1982	Illinois Wesleyan	4–5	4–4	T–5th	
1983	Illinois Wesleyan	5–4	5–3	T–3rd	
1984	Illinois Wesleyan	5–4	5–3	T–3rd	
1985	Illinois Wesleyan	3–6	3–5	5th	
1986	Illinois Wesleyan	5–3–1	4–3–1	T–4th	
Illinois Wesleyan:		166–121–6	142–89–6		
Total:		166–121–6			
National championship Conference title Conference division title or championship game berth
