= 1970 Westminster Titans football team =

American college football season

1970 Westminster Titans football

NAIA Division II national champion

NAIA Division II Championship Game, W 21–16 vs. Anderson (IN)
- Conference: Independent
- Record: 10–0
- Head coach: Harold Burry (19th season)
- Home stadium: Westminster College Memorial Field

1970 NAIA Division II independents football records
	Conf.			Overall
Team	W	L	T	W		L		T
No. 1 Westminster (PA) ^		–		10	–	0	–	0
No. 6 Simon Fraser		–		8	–	0	–	0
No. T–20 Frostburg State		–		7	–	1	–	0
No. 7 Cal Lutheran		–		8	–	1	–	1
Franklin (IN)		–		7	–	3	–	0
Georgetown (KY)		–		6	–	3	–	0
Eureka		–		5	–	3	–	0
Grove City		–		5	–	3	–	1
Iowa Wesleyan		–		5	–	4	–	0
Waynesburg		–		5	–	4	–	0
Texas Lutheran		–		5	–	4	–	1
Azusa Pacific		–		3	–	5	–	0
Oklahoma Panhandle State		–		4	–	7	–	0
Austin		–		3	–	6	–	0
Missouri Southern		–		2	–	7	–	1
Geneva		–		1	–	8	–	0
Missouri Western		–		1	–	8	–	0
^ – NAIA Division II playoff participant; Rankings from NAIA Division II poll

The 1970 Westminster Titans football team was an American football team that won the NAIA Division II football national championship. They represented Westminster College, a small college in New Wilmington, Pennsylvania, with a total enrollment of 1,558 students, competing against other "small" colleges like Texas A&I with enrollments as high as 21,000. The Titans competed as an independent during the 1970 NAIA Division II football season. In their 19th season under head coach Harold Burry, the Titans compiled a perfect 10–0 record and outscored opponents by a total of 284 to 62. Burry was inducted into the College Football Hall of Fame in 1996.

== Schedule ==
Date	Opponent	Site	Result	Attendance	Source
September 19	at Marietta	Don Drumm Stadium; Marietta, OH	W 26–6		
September 26	Susquehanna	Westminster College Memorial Field; New Wilmington, PA	W 38–0		
October 3	at Lycoming	Williamsport, PA	W 28–0		
October 10	Waynesburg	Westminster College Memorial Field; New Wilmington, PA	W 51–0		
October 24	at Heidelberg	Columbian Stadium; Tiffin, OH	W 40–20	3,200	
October 31	John Carroll^{†}	Westminster College Memorial Field; New Wilmington, PA	W 20–6	4,000	
November 7	at Carnegie Mellon	Pittsburgh, PA	W 27–7		
November 14	Geneva	Westminster College Memorial Field; New Wilmington, PA	W 13–0		
November 28	vs. Edinboro State	Taggart Stadium; New Castle, PA (NAIA Division II semifinal)	W 20–7	6,000	
December 5	vs. Anderson (IN)	Taggart Stadium; New Castle, PA (NAIA Division II Championship Game)	W 21–16	5,000	
^{†}Homecoming

== Season overview ==
=== Marietta ===
Westminster opened its 1970 season on September 19 with a 26–6 victory over the Marietta Pioneers at Don Drumm Stadium in Marietta, Ohio. The Titans out-gained the Pioneers by 319 yards of total offense to 113. Two of Westminster's starting backs, fullback Mark Acerni and halfback Joe Veres, were injured in the game. Quarterback Dave Bierbach threw a 39-yard touchdown pass to Roger Price and also scored on a quarterback sneak in the second quarter. John Ebersberger added two field goals and two extra points for Westminster.

=== Susquehanna ===
On September 26, Westminster began a streak of three consecutive shutouts, defeating the Susquehanna Crusaders, 38–0, in its home opener at Memorial Field in New Wilmington, Pennsylvania. The Titans' defense held the Crusaders to 35 rushing yards, intercepted four passes, and recovered two Susqehanna fumbles. Linebacker Bob Matthews also blocked and simultaneously held onto a punt which he then returned for 25 yards and a touchdown.

=== Lycoming ===
The Titans recorded their second consecutive shutout on October 3, defeating the Lycoming Warriors by a 28–0 score at Williamsport, Pennsylvania. Westminster quarterback Dave Bierbach completed eight of 12 passes for 119 yards and a touchdown and also rushed for 53 yards and a touchdown. Westminster safety Fran Tobias also intercepted a pass at the two-yard line and returned it 98 yards for a touchdown to give the Titans a 21–0 lead at halftime. A thunder storm limited the offensive production in the second half.

=== Waynesburg ===
Westminster won its most one-sided game, a 51–0 shutout against the Waynesburg Yellow Jackets, on October 10. The Titans out-gained the Yellow Jackets by 496 yards of total offense to only 68 yards. After the game, coach Burry said: "The boys play good hard football . . . This team is one of the best I've coached."

=== Heidelberg ===
On October 24, Westminster defeated the Heidelberg Student Princes, 40–20, in Tiffin, Ohio. Westminster quarterback threw two touchdowns to halfback Roger Price in the first quarter to take a 13–0 lead. The Titans then let Heidelberg back into the game by turning the ball over seven times on five fumbles and two interceptions. However, Heidelberg also turned the ball over seven times on five interceptions and two fumbles lost.

=== Homecoming: John Carroll ===
On October 31, Westminster defeated the John Carroll Blue Streaks by a 20–6 score. It was the 19th consecutive year in which the Titans won their homecoming game. Halfback Joe Veres accounted for the majority of Westminster's offensive output, tallying 69 rushing yards and 32 receiving yards. Veres scored two touchdowns, one on a 24-yard touchdown reception in the third quarter and the other on a 13-yard run in the fourth quarter.

=== Carnegie Mellon ===
Westminster registered its seventh consecutive win of the season on November 7, defeating the Carnegie Mellon Tartans by a 27–7 score in Pittsburgh. The teams' total yardage was close (294 for Westminster, 226 for Carnegie Mellon), but Westminster capitalized on its scoring opportunities with four touchdowns to one for Carnegie Mellon. The Tartans also gave up four turnovers on two interceptions and two fumbles. Westminster's junior halfback Joe Veres scored two rushing touchdowns, and quarterback Dave Bierbach threw two touchdown passes.

=== Geneva ===
On November 14, Westminster defeated the Geneva Tornadoes, 13–0, in the regular season finale on a muddy Memorial Field in New Wilmington. Westminster blocked three Geneva punts and forced three fumbles. Westminster scored both of its touchdowns on blocked punts in the first quarter. Westminster totaled only 59 yards of total offense and held Geneva to 44 yards. The teams combined for a total of six first downs. Coach Burry blamed the muddy field for the lack of offensive production.

=== NAIA Division II semifinal: Edinboro State ===
The Titans advanced to the NAIA Division II playoffs and defeated Edinboro State, 20–7, in its semifinal match before a crowd of 6,000 at Taggart Stadium in New Castle, Pennsylvania. Westminster tackle Mickey Annarella played a key role, recovering a fumble at the Edinboro 20-yard line and later blocking a punt at the Edinboro 41-yard line. Defensive back Ken Fassio also intercepted two passes. Westminster coach Harold Burry, who had been at Westminster's helm for 19 years, called the victory his "greatest win ever."

=== National Championship Game: Anderson ===
In the NAIA Division II National Championship Game, the Titans defeated the Anderson Ravens, 21–16, at New Castle, Pennsylvania. Westminster took a 21–0 lead at halftime and withstood 16 unanswered points from Anderson in the second half. Quarterback Dave Bierbach threw two touchdown passes to split end Dave Milliron. Halfback Joe Veres rushed for 105 yards.

== Personnel ==
=== Key players ===
Quarterback Dave Bierbach was selected as the most valuable player in both the semifinals and championship game. Other key players on the 1970 team included linebacker Rich Hancox, offensive guard Fred Blackhurst, halfback Joe Veres, and split end Dave Milliren.

=== Roster ===
==== Offense ====
- Mark Acerni, fullback, 6'1", 210 pounds, junior
- Dave Bierbach, quarterback, 5'11", 180 pounds, senior
- Fred Blackhurst, right guard, 5'10", 195 pounds, junior
- Bill Cole, right end, 6'2", 195 pounds, sophomore
- Bill Fitts, left end, 6'2", 185 pounds, sophomore
- Pat Johnston, right tackle, 6'2", 220 pounds, senior
- Scot McClester, left guard, 6'0", 190 pounds, 215 pounds, senior
- Roger Neel, left tackle, 6'3", 215 pounds, sophomore
- Roger Price, halfback, 6'0", 175 pounds, senior
- Bill Sweterlitsch, center, 6'1", 210 pounds, sophomore
- Joe Veres, halfback, 5'9", 170 pounds, junior

==== Defense ====
- Mike Annarella, left tackle, 5'11", 215 pounds, junior
- Ned Becker, right end, 6'2", 190 pounds, senior
- Ken Fassio, halfback, 5'10", 170 pounds, junior
- Don Grimm, inside linebacker, 5'11", 205 pounds, junior
- Rick Hancox, outside linebacker, 5'9", 165 pounds, senior
- Bob Matthews, outside linebacker, 6'3", 195 pounds, senior
- Tom Nebel, left end, 5'11", 190 pounds, junior
- Marvin Smith, right tackle, 6'0", 210 pounds, junior
- John Thompson, safety, 5'11", 175 pounds, senior
- Fritz Tobias, halfback, 5'8", 170 pounds, senior
- Darryl West, inside linebacker, 6'2", 190 pounds, junior
