= 1965 Illinois Wesleyan Titans football team =

American college football season

1965 Illinois Wesleyan Titans football

CCI champion
- Conference: College Conference of Illinois
- Record: 8–0 (6–0 CCI)
- Head coach: Don Larson (12th season)
- Home stadium: IWU Stadium

1965 College Conference of Illinois football standings
	Conf.					Overall
Team	W		L		T	W		L		T
No. 7 Illinois Wesleyan $	6	–	0	–	0	8	–	0	–	0
Carthage	5	–	1	–	0	6	–	2	–	0
North Central (IL)	3	–	3	–	0	5	–	3	–	0
Augustana (IL)	2	–	2	–	2	4	–	2	–	2
Carroll (WI)	1	–	4	–	1	3	–	4	–	1
Millikin	1	–	4	–	1	2	–	5	–	1
North Park	1	–	5	–	0	2	–	6	–	0
$ – Conference champion; Rankings from NAIA poll

The 1965 Illinois Wesleyan Titans football team was an American football team that represented Illinois Wesleyan University as a member of the College Conference of Illinois (CCI) during the 1965 NAIA football season. In their 12th year under head coach Don Larson, the Titans compiled a perfect 8–0 record (6–0 against conference opponents), won the CCI championship, and outscored opponents by a total of 255 to 66. Illinois Wesleyan finished seventh in the final National Association of Intercollegiate Athletics (NAIA) rankings.

== Schedule ==
Date	Opponent	Site	Result	Attendance	Source
September 25	Illinois State*	IWU Stadium; Bloomington, IL	W 34–7	7,500	
October 2	at North Park	Chicago, IL	W 27–14		
October 9	North Central (IL)	IWU Stadium; Bloomington, IL	W 21–7		
October 16	at Carroll (WI)	Waukesha, WI	W 21–18		
October 23	at Wheaton*	Wheaton, IL	W 33–0		
October 30	Augustana (IL)	IWU Stadium; Bloomington, IL	W 20–7		
November 6	at Carthage	Kenosha, WI	W 37–13		
November 13	Millikin	IWU Stadium; Bloomington, IL	W 62–0		
*Non-conference game
