= 1965 Grambling Tigers football team =

American college football season

1965 Grambling Tigers football

SWAC champion

Pecan Bowl, L 7–20 vs. North Dakota State
- Conference: Southwestern Athletic Conference
- Record: 8–3 (6–1 SWAC)
- Head coach: Eddie Robinson (23rd season)
- Home stadium: Grambling Stadium

1965 Southwestern Athletic Conference football standings
	Conf.					Overall
Team	W		L		T	W		L		T
No. 13 Grambling $	6	–	1	–	0	8	–	3	–	0
Southern	4	–	2	–	1	5	–	4	–	1
Texas Southern	4	–	2	–	1	5	–	4	–	1
Jackson State	3	–	3	–	1	5	–	3	–	1
Prairie View A&M	3	–	3	–	1	5	–	3	–	1
Arkansas AM&N	3	–	3	–	1	4	–	5	–	1
Alcorn A&M	2	–	4	–	1	3	–	5	–	1
Wiley	0	–	7	–	0	1	–	7	–	0
$ – Conference champion; Rankings from UPI small college poll

The 1965 Grambling Tigers football team represented Grambling College (now known as Grambling State University) as a member of the Southwestern Athletic Conference (SWAC) during the 1965 NCAA College Division football season. Led by 23rd-year head coach Eddie Robinson, the Tigers compiled an overall record of 8–3 and a mark of 6–1 in conference play, and finished as SWAC champion.

== Schedule ==
Date	Opponent	Rank	Site	Result	Attendance	Source
September 18	at Alcorn A&M		Henderson Stadium; Lorman, MS	W 26–13	11,000	
October 2	Prairie View A&M		Grambling Stadium; Grambling, LA (rivalry)	W 44–7	23,000	
October 9	at Tennessee A&I*		Hale Stadium; Nashville, TN	L 7–40	8,000–24,000	
October 16	Mississippi Valley State*		Grambling Stadium; Grambling, LA	W 30–14	18,000	
October 23	at Jackson State		Alumni Stadium; Jackson, MS	W 51–20	6,400–21,000	
October 30	Texas Southern^{†}		Grambling Stadium; Grambling, LA	L 6–26	16,000–25,000	
November 6	at Arkansas AM&N		Pumphrey Stadium; Pine Bluff, AR	W 21–9	18,0000	
November 13	Wiley		Grambling Stadium; Grambling, LA	W 72–14	21,000	
November 20	Southern		Grambling Stadium; Grambling, LA (rivalry)	W 34–14	29,310–45,000	
November 25	vs. Lincoln (MO)*		City Park Stadium; New Orleans, LA (Sugar Cup Classic)	W 54–18		
December 11	vs. No. 1 North Dakota State*	No. T–13	Shotwell Stadium; Abilene, TX (Pecan Bowl)	L 7–20	9,000	
*Non-conference game; ^{†}Homecoming; Rankings from UPI Poll released prior to the game
