= 1970 Simon Fraser Clan football team =

American college football season

1970 Simon Fraser Clan football
- Conference: Independent
- Record: 8–0
- Head coach: Lorne Davies (6th season)
- Offensive scheme: Option
- Base defense: 3–4
- Home stadium: Empire Stadium

1970 NAIA Division II independents football records
	Conf.			Overall
Team	W	L	T	W		L		T
No. 1 Westminster (PA) ^		–		10	–	0	–	0
No. 6 Simon Fraser		–		8	–	0	–	0
No. T–20 Frostburg State		–		7	–	1	–	0
No. 7 Cal Lutheran		–		8	–	1	–	1
Franklin (IN)		–		7	–	3	–	0
Georgetown (KY)		–		6	–	3	–	0
Eureka		–		5	–	3	–	0
Grove City		–		5	–	3	–	1
Iowa Wesleyan		–		5	–	4	–	0
Waynesburg		–		5	–	4	–	0
Texas Lutheran		–		5	–	4	–	1
Azusa Pacific		–		3	–	5	–	0
Oklahoma Panhandle State		–		4	–	7	–	0
Austin		–		3	–	6	–	0
Missouri Southern		–		2	–	7	–	1
Geneva		–		1	–	8	–	0
Missouri Western		–		1	–	8	–	0
^ – NAIA Division II playoff participant; Rankings from NAIA Division II poll

The 1970 Simon Fraser Clan football team, commonly known as the Clansmen, was a Canadian college football team that represented Simon Fraser University as an independent during the 1970 NAIA Division II football season. In their sixth year under head coach Lorne Davies, the Clansmen compiled a perfect 8–0 record. They played seven of their eight games against American college teams and under American football rules. Their perfect season in 1970 followed a 1–6–1 record in 1969 and remained the only undefeated season in the history of the Simon Fraser football program. At the end of the season, Simon Fraser was ranked No. 2 among Northwest small colleges in voting by regional sports writers and broadcasters.

The team was led on offense by quarterback Dave Syme and running back Terry Bailey. Twelve of the team's players later played professional football in the Canadian Football League.

== Schedule ==
=== Preseason ===
Date	Opponent	Site	Result	Attendance	Source
September 7	Seattle Cavaliers		W 24–14 (exhibition)		
September 12	B.C. Rebels	Queen's Park Arena; Vancouver, B.C.	W 42–3 (scrimmage)		

=== Regular season ===
Date	Opponent	Site	Result	Attendance	Source
September 19	Portland State	Empire Stadium; Vancouver, B.C.	W 21–12	5,610	
September 26	Whitman	Empire Stadium; Vancouver, B.C.	W 36–13		
October 3	Whitworth	Empire Stadium; Vancouver, B.C.	W 35–13	600	
October 10	at Western Washington	Civic Stadium; Bellingham, WA	W 7–0		
October 17	Oregon College	Empire Stadium; Vancouver, B.C.	W 21–16		
October 31	British Columbia	Empire Stadium; Vancouver, B.C. (Shrum Bowl)	W 61–6		
November 7	at Oregon Tech	Klamath Falls, OR	W 42–23		
November 14	Puget Sound	Empire Stadium; Vancouver, B.C.	W 24–14	2,000-2,500	
