= 1965 Texas Southern Tigers football team =

American college football season

1965 Texas Southern Tigers football
- Conference: Southwestern Athletic Conference
- Record: 5–4–1 (4–2–1 SWAC)
- Head coach: Clifford Paul (1st season)
- Home stadium: Jeppesen Stadium

1965 Southwestern Athletic Conference football standings
	Conf.					Overall
Team	W		L		T	W		L		T
No. 13 Grambling $	6	–	1	–	0	8	–	3	–	0
Southern	4	–	2	–	1	5	–	4	–	1
Texas Southern	4	–	2	–	1	5	–	4	–	1
Jackson State	3	–	3	–	1	5	–	3	–	1
Prairie View A&M	3	–	3	–	1	5	–	3	–	1
Arkansas AM&N	3	–	3	–	1	4	–	5	–	1
Alcorn A&M	2	–	4	–	1	3	–	5	–	1
Wiley	0	–	7	–	0	1	–	7	–	0
$ – Conference champion; Rankings from UPI small college poll

The 1965 Texas Southern Tigers football team was an American football team that represented Texas Southern University as a member of the Southwestern Athletic Conference (SWAC) during the 1965 NAIA football season. Led by first-year head coach Clifford Paul, the Tigers compiled an overall record of 5–4–1, with a mark of 4–2–1 in conference play, and finished tied for second in the SWAC.

== Schedule ==
Date	Opponent	Site	Result	Attendance	Source
September 18	at Southern	University Stadium; Baton Rouge, LA	T 14–14		
September 25	Wiley	Jeppesen Stadium; Houston, TX	W 28–0		
October 2	Tennessee A&I*	Jeppesen Stadium; Houston, TX	L 7–32	10,000	
October 9	at Mississippi Valley State*	Magnolia Stadium; Itta Bena, MS	L 6–7		
October 16	Alcorn A&M	Jeppesen Stadium; Houston, TX	L 6–14		
October 30	at Grambling	Grambling Stadium; Grambling, LA	W 26–6	16,000–25,000	
November 6	Jackson State	Jeppesen Stadium; Houston, TX	W 26–14		
November 13	Arkansas AM&N	Jeppesen Stadium; Houston, TX	L 14–15		
November 20	Prairie View A&M	Jeppesen Stadium; Houston, TX (rivalry)	W 16–0		
November 27	vs. Florida A&M*	Gator Bowl Stadium; Jacksonville, FL	W 34–21		
*Non-conference game
