= 1965 Arkansas AM&N Golden Lions football team =

American college football season

1965 Arkansas AM&N Golden Lions football
- Conference: Southwestern Athletic Conference
- Record: 4–5–1 (3–3–1 SWAC)
- Head coach: Vannette W. Johnson (4th season)
- Home stadium: Pumphrey Stadium

1965 Southwestern Athletic Conference football standings
	Conf.					Overall
Team	W		L		T	W		L		T
No. 13 Grambling $	6	–	1	–	0	8	–	3	–	0
Southern	4	–	2	–	1	5	–	4	–	1
Texas Southern	4	–	2	–	1	5	–	4	–	1
Jackson State	3	–	3	–	1	5	–	3	–	1
Prairie View A&M	3	–	3	–	1	5	–	3	–	1
Arkansas AM&N	3	–	3	–	1	4	–	5	–	1
Alcorn A&M	2	–	4	–	1	3	–	5	–	1
Wiley	0	–	7	–	0	1	–	7	–	0
$ – Conference champion; Rankings from UPI small college poll

The 1965 Arkansas AM&N Golden Lions football team represented the Arkansas Agricultural, Mechanical and Normal College (now known as the University of Arkansas at Pine Bluff) as a member of the Southwestern Athletic Conference (SWAC) during the 1965 NCAA College Division football season. Led by fourth-year head coach Vannette W. Johnson, the Golden Lions compiled an overall record of 4–5–1, with a conference record of 3–3–1, and finished tied for fourth in the SWAC.

== Schedule ==
Date	Opponent	Site	Result	Attendance	Source
September 18	at Mississippi Valley State*	Magnolia Stadium; Itta Bena, MS	L 13–19		
September 25	at Lincoln (MO)*	LU Stadium; Jefferson City, MO	W 19–6		
October 2	Jackson State	Pumphrey Stadium; Pine Bluff, AR	L 21–24	3,500	
October 9	at Southern	University Stadium; Baton Rouge, LA	W 24–15		
October 16	Bishop*	Pumphrey Stadium; Pine Bluff, AR	L 13–14		
October 23	Prairie View A&M	Pumphrey Stadium; Pine Bluff, AR	L 14–24		
October 30	at Alcorn A&M	Henderson Stadium; Lorman, MS	T 10–10		
November 6	Grambling	Pumphrey Stadium; Pine Bluff, AR	L 9–21	18,000	
November 13	at Texas Southern	Jeppesen Stadium; Houston, TX	W 15–14		
November 20	Wiley	Pumphrey Stadium; Pine Bluff, AR	W 51–7		
*Non-conference game
