= 1965 Southwest Texas State Bobcats football team =

American college football season

1965 Southwest Texas State Bobcats football
- Conference: Lone Star Conference
- Record: 8–2 (4–2 LSC)
- Head coach: Bill Miller (1st season)
- Home stadium: Evans Field

1965 Lone Star Conference football standings
	Conf.					Overall
Team	W		L		T	W		L		T
No. 2 Sul Ross $^	6	–	0	–	0	10	–	1	–	0
Southwest Texas State	4	–	2	–	0	8	–	2	–	0
Stephen F. Austin	4	–	2	–	0	6	–	3	–	0
Texas A&I	4	–	2	–	0	6	–	3	–	0
East Texas State	2	–	4	–	0	4	–	5	–	0
Sam Houston State	1	–	4	–	0	4	–	6	–	0
Howard Payne	0	–	6	–	0	2	–	8	–	0
McMurry	0	–	0	–	0	4	–	5	–	1
$ – Conference champion; ^ – NAIA playoff participant; Rankings from NAIA poll

The 1965 Southwest Texas State Bobcats football team was an American football team that represented Southwest Texas State College (now known as Texas State University) during the 1965 NAIA football season as a member of the Lone Star Conference (LSC). In their first year under head coach Bill Miller, the team compiled an overall record of 8–2 with a mark of 4–2 in conference play.

== Schedule ==
Date	Opponent	Site	Result	Attendance	Source
September 18	at Texas Lutheran*	Matador Field; Seguin, TX	W 31–0	6,500	
September 25	Trinity (TX)*	Evans Field; San Marcos, TX	W 27–0	5,200–5,500	
October 2	Sul Ross	Evans Field; San Marcos, TX	L 14–21	5,200	
October 9	McMurry	Evans Field; San Marcos, TX	W 17–6	4,500	
October 16	at Howard Payne	Lion Stadium; Brownwood, TX	W 37–0	3,500	
October 23	Sam Houston State	Evans Field; San Marcos, TX (rivalry)	W 17–7	8,500	
October 30	at Angelo State*	San Angelo Stadium; San Angelo, TX	W 35–7	6,500	
November 6	at Stephen F. Austin	Memorial Stadium; Nacogdoches, TX	L 13–17	7,151	
November 13	at East Texas State	Memorial Stadium; Commerce, TX	W 24–16	5,100	
November 20	at Texas A&I	Javelina Stadium; Kingsville, TX	W 13–0	6,000	
*Non-conference game
