= 1965 Georgetown Tigers football team =

American college football season

1965 Georgetown Tigers football
- Conference: Independent
- Record: 9–0
- Head coach: Lester Craft (5th season)
- Home stadium: Hinton Field

1965 NAIA independents football records
| | Conf. | | | Overall |
| Team | W | L | T | W | | L | | T |
|---|---|---|---|---|---|---|---|---|
| Georgetown (KY) | | – | | 9 | – | 0 | – | 0 |
| No. 15 Cal Lutheran | | – | | 8 | – | 1 | – | 0 |
| No. 18 Southern Colorado State | | – | | 8 | – | 1 | – | 1 |
| No. 20 Austin | | – | | 7 | – | 2 | – | 0 |
| Earlham | | – | | 7 | – | 2 | – | 0 |
| No. 13 Findlay | | – | | 7 | – | 2 | – | 0 |
| No. 14 Northern Michigan | | – | | 7 | – | 3 | – | 0 |
| Hillsdale | | – | | 6 | – | 3 | – | 0 |
| La Verne | | – | | 5 | – | 3 | – | 0 |
| Carson–Newman | | – | | 5 | – | 4 | – | 0 |
| New Mexico Highlands | | – | | 5 | – | 4 | – | 0 |
| Wofford | | – | | 5 | – | 4 | – | 0 |
| Westminster (UT) | | – | | 3 | – | 3 | – | 0 |
| McMurry | | – | | 4 | – | 5 | – | 1 |
| Simon Fraser | | – | | 2 | – | 3 | – | 0 |
| Doane | | – | | 3 | – | 6 | – | 0 |
| Oklahoma Panhandle State | | – | | 3 | – | 6 | – | 0 |
| Eastern New Mexico | | – | | 2 | – | 6 | – | 1 |
| Azusa Pacific | | – | | 1 | – | 6 | – | 0 |
| Iowa Wesleyan | | – | | 1 | – | 7 | – | 0 |
| St. Mary of the Plains | | – | | 0 | – | 9 | – | 0 |
Rankings from NAIA poll

The 1965 Georgetown Tigers football team was an American football team that represented Georgetown College (Kentucky) as an independent during the 1965 NAIA football season. In their fifth season under head coach Lester Craft, the Tigers compiled a perfect 9–0 record, held eight opponents to seven or fewer points, and outscored all opponents by a total of 169 to 44. It was the first undefeated college football team from Kentucky since the 1955 Centre Colonels football team. Georgetown was ranked No. 10 in the NAIA at the end of the season.

Craft later described the 1965 team as a "four yards and a cloud of dust" club that relied on the run and averaged about 10 passes per game. He also recalled that defense was the team's "forte".

The team played its home games on Hinton Field in Georgetown, Kentucky.

== Schedule ==
| Date | Opponent | Site | Result | Attendance | Source |
|---|---|---|---|---|---|
| September 18 | at Hanover | Hanover, IN | W 14–0 | 2,000 | |
| September 25 | at Franklin (IN) | Franklin, IN | W 27–6 | | |
| October 2 | at Maryville (TN) | Maryville, TN | W 23–0 | | |
| October 9 | Millsaps | Hinton Field; Georgetown, KY | W 10–7 | | |
| October 16 | Principia | Hinton Field; Georgetown, KY | W 10–6 | 4,000 | |
| October 23 | Concord | Hinton Field; Georgetown, KY | W 14–13 | | |
| October 30 | at Defiance | Defiance, OH | W 21–6 | | |
| November 6 | Anderson (IN) | Hinton Field; Georgetown, KY | W 28–6 | | |
| November 13 | at Mars Hill | Mars Hill, NC | W 22–0 | | |

== Key players and honors ==
Craft was named coach of the year in District 24 and in Area 5 by the NAIA and as small-college coach of the year by the Knoxville News Sentinel.

The 1965 team was inducted as a group into the Georgetown Athletics Hall of Fame in 2003. Others affiliated with the 1965 team have also been inducted individually including Lester Craft (1999), quarterback Jan Anderson (2005), guard Clyde Whitlach (2016), and Leonard Kern (2017). Anderson received honorable mention on the 1965 Associated Press Little All-America team. Kern played at both defensive tackle and offensive guard on the 1965 team and received the Earl Hunley Award as the lineman of the year.

Other key players included senior fullback Larry Treece, guard Kyle Ramey, and sophomore linebacker Richard Hagy. Tom Seals tied an NAIA record with eight field goals in 1965, made 60 unassisted tackles on defense, and was selected as a first-team NAIA All-American.
