= 1965 Simon Fraser Clan football team =

American college football season

1965 Simon Fraser Clan football
- Conference: Independent
- Head coach: Lorne Davies (1st season)
- Offensive scheme: Option
- Base defense: 3–4
- Home stadium: Queen's Park Arena; Empire Stadium

1965 NAIA independents football records
	Conf.			Overall
Team	W	L	T	W		L		T
Georgetown (KY)		–		9	–	0	–	0
No. 15 Cal Lutheran		–		8	–	1	–	0
No. 18 Southern Colorado State		–		8	–	1	–	1
No. 20 Austin		–		7	–	2	–	0
Earlham		–		7	–	2	–	0
No. 13 Findlay		–		7	–	2	–	0
No. 14 Northern Michigan		–		7	–	3	–	0
Hillsdale		–		6	–	3	–	0
La Verne		–		5	–	3	–	0
Carson–Newman		–		5	–	4	–	0
New Mexico Highlands		–		5	–	4	–	0
Wofford		–		5	–	4	–	0
Westminster (UT)		–		3	–	3	–	0
McMurry		–		4	–	5	–	1
Simon Fraser		–		2	–	3	–	0
Doane		–		3	–	6	–	0
Oklahoma Panhandle State		–		3	–	6	–	0
Eastern New Mexico		–		2	–	6	–	1
Azusa Pacific		–		1	–	6	–	0
Iowa Wesleyan		–		1	–	7	–	0
St. Mary of the Plains		–		0	–	9	–	0
Rankings from NAIA poll

The 1965 Simon Fraser Clan football team, also known as the Clansmen, was a Canadian college football team, playing American football rules, that represented Simon Fraser University as an independent during the 1965 NAIA football season. Led by head coach Lorne Davies, the 1965 season was the program's inaugural season. The Clan played two home games at Queen's Park Arena in New Westminster while Empire Stadium in Vancouver hosted a game.

The team's schedule consisted of five exhibition games, with the Clan finishing with a record of 2–3. The two victories came against the Vancouver Kats and the Bellingham Bell-Jets, both members of the semi-professional North Pacific Football League.

== Schedule ==
Date	Opponent	Site	Result
September 25	Vancouver Kats	Queen's Park Arena; New Westminster, BC	W 19–14
October 4	Western Washington State Junior Varsity	Queen's Park Arena; New Westminster, BC	L 0–10
October 15	at Washington Freshmen	Husky Stadium; Seattle, WA	L 7–34
October 29	at Bellingham Bell-Jets	Civic Stadium; Bellingham, WA	W 19–6
November 13	Oregon State Freshmen	Empire Stadium; Vancouver, BC	L 6–30

== Roster ==
1965 Simon Fraser Clan Football
Quarterbacks: 11 Jim Jardine – freshman (5'10, 175); 16 Bob Cullen – freshman (6'2, 180); 19 Chris Hawkes – freshman (6'3, 180); Halfbacks: 18 Herb Lang – freshman (5'10, 180); 20 Bob Boyer – freshman (6'0, 180); 21 Bill Robinson – freshman (5'9, 180); 22 Ron Faulkner – freshman (6'2, 180); 24 Ed Johnson – freshman (6'0, 175); 25 Byron Gracie – freshman (5'9, 160); 26 Ron Ritchie – freshman (5'8, 180); 27 Kim Rawley – freshman (5'10, 180); Fullbacks: 33 Randy Davies – freshman (5'9, 185); 35 Dennis Collins – freshman (5'11, 190); 36 Dave Cutler – freshman (5'10, 190); Centers: 50 Gary Robinson – freshman (6'4, 215); 52 Luigi Marcuzzi – freshman (5'9, 220); 55 Russ Jenkins – freshman (6'3, 220); 83 Barry Morton – freshman (6'2, 200)	Guards: 37 Dennis Dixon – freshman (6'1, 200); 53 Rick Fears – freshman (6'0, 180); 61 Bill O'Doherty – freshman (6'1, 190); 63 Al Gordichuk – freshman (6'1, 215); 66 Bob Smith – freshman (6'0, 180); 69 Doug Sheffield – freshman (6'1, 200); Tackles: 28 Dave Allen – freshman (6'3, 190); 64 Don Lumb – freshman (6'3, 195); 67 Hans Jaanusson – freshman (6'3, 205); 68 Simo Korpisto – freshman (6'4, 210); 70 Tim Nugent – freshman (6'0, 235); 72 Bill Griffis – freshman (6'2, 220); 73 Byron Wright – freshman (6'4, 240); 74 Bo Skapski – freshman (6'2, 220); 75 Bob McGeein – freshman (6'2, 230); 77 Chris Beaton – freshman (6'1, 210); 89 Ron Warner – freshman (6'2, 212); Ends: 80 Ted Warkentin – freshman (6'4, 190); 82 Bob Main – freshman (6'2, 207); 84 Rob McLaren – freshman (6'1, 193); 86 Gary Conley – freshman (6'1, 180); 87 Paul Dumas – freshman (6'1, 180); 88 Roger Kettlewell – freshman (6'2, 195); 92 Rick Sanders – freshman (5'10, 177); 95 Ron Reichelt – freshman (5'11, 180)
