= 1965 Sam Houston State Bearkats football team =

American college football season

1965 Sam Houston State Bearkats football
- Conference: Lone Star Conference
- Record: 4–6 (1–5 LSC)
- Head coach: Paul Pierce (14th season)
- Home stadium: Pritchett Field

1965 Lone Star Conference football standings
	Conf.					Overall
Team	W		L		T	W		L		T
No. 2 Sul Ross $^	6	–	0	–	0	10	–	1	–	0
Southwest Texas State	4	–	2	–	0	8	–	2	–	0
Stephen F. Austin	4	–	2	–	0	6	–	3	–	0
Texas A&I	4	–	2	–	0	6	–	3	–	0
East Texas State	2	–	4	–	0	4	–	5	–	0
Sam Houston State	1	–	4	–	0	4	–	6	–	0
Howard Payne	0	–	6	–	0	2	–	8	–	0
McMurry	0	–	0	–	0	4	–	5	–	1
$ – Conference champion; ^ – NAIA playoff participant; Rankings from NAIA poll

The 1965 Sam Houston State Bearkats football team represented Sam Houston State College (now known as Sam Houston State University) as a member of the Lone Star Conference (LSC) during the 1965 NAIA football season. Led by 14th-year head coach Paul Pierce, the Bearkats compiled an overall record of 4–6 with a mark of 1–5 in conference play, and finished sixth in the LSC.

== Schedule ==
Date	Opponent	Site	Result	Attendance	Source
September 18	at Angelo State*	San Angelo Stadium; San Angelo, TX	L 12–19	6,500	
September 25	Corpus Christi*	Pritchett Field; Huntsville, TX	W 35–9	6,500	
October 2	Tarleton State*	Pritchett Field; Huntsville, TX	W 14–3	6,500	
October 9	Howard Payne	Pritchett Field; Huntsville, TX	W 14–0	7,000	
October 16	at Texas Lutheran*	Matador Field; Seguin, TX	W 28–0	3,500	
October 23	at Southwest Texas State	Evans Field; San Marcos, TX	L 7–17	8,500	
October 30	Stephen F. Austin	Pritchett Field; Huntsville, TX (rivalry)	L 13–14	6,500	
November 6	at East Texas State	Memorial Stadium; Commerce, TX	L 0–7	9,000	
November 13	Texas A&I	Pritchett Field; Huntsville, TX	L 6–14	8,500	
November 20	at No. 8 Sul Ross	Jackson Field; Alpine, TX	L 23–29		
*Non-conference game; Rankings from AP Poll released prior to the game
