= 1965 Alcorn A&M Braves football team =

American college football season

1965 Alcorn A&M Braves football
- Conference: Southwestern Athletic Conference
- Record: 3–5–1 (2–4–1 SWAC)
- Head coach: Marino Casem (2nd season)
- Home stadium: Henderson Stadium

1965 Southwestern Athletic Conference football standings
	Conf.					Overall
Team	W		L		T	W		L		T
No. 13 Grambling $	6	–	1	–	0	8	–	3	–	0
Southern	4	–	2	–	1	5	–	4	–	1
Texas Southern	4	–	2	–	1	5	–	4	–	1
Jackson State	3	–	3	–	1	5	–	3	–	1
Prairie View A&M	3	–	3	–	1	5	–	3	–	1
Arkansas AM&N	3	–	3	–	1	4	–	5	–	1
Alcorn A&M	2	–	4	–	1	3	–	5	–	1
Wiley	0	–	7	–	0	1	–	7	–	0
$ – Conference champion; Rankings from UPI small college poll

The 1965 Alcorn A&M Braves football team represented Alcorn A&M College (now known as Alcorn State University) as a member of the Southwestern Athletic Conference (SWAC) during the 1965 NCAA College Division football season. Led by second-year head coach Marino Casem, the Braves compiled an overall record of 3–5–1, with a conference record of 2–4–1, and finished seventh in the SWAC.

== Schedule ==
Date	Opponent	Site	Result	Attendance	Source
September 18	Grambling	Henderson Stadium; Lorman, MS	L 13–26	11,000	
September 25	at Jackson State	Alumni Field; Jackson, MS (rivalry)	L 6–21	9,300	
October 9	Wiley	Henderson Stadium; Lorman, MS	W 27–6		
October 16	at Texas Southern	Jeppesen Stadium; Houston, TX	W 14–6		
October 24	at Southern	University Stadium; Baton Rouge, LA	L 7–41		
October 30	Arkansas AM&N	Henderson Stadium; Lorman, MS	T 10–10		
November 6	Mississippi Valley State*	Henderson Stadium; Lorman, MS	W 15–14		
November 13	Prairie View A&M	Henderson Stadium; Lorman, MS	L 14–17		
November 20	at Bishop*	Bishop Stadium; Dallas, TX	L 14–38		
*Non-conference game
