= 1965 East Texas State Lions football team =

American college football season

1965 East Texas State Lions football
- Conference: Lone Star Conference
- Record: 4–5 (2–4 LSC)
- Head coach: Ernest Hawkins (2nd season)
- Home stadium: Memorial Stadium

1965 Lone Star Conference football standings
	Conf.					Overall
Team	W		L		T	W		L		T
No. 2 Sul Ross $^	6	–	0	–	0	10	–	1	–	0
Southwest Texas State	4	–	2	–	0	8	–	2	–	0
Stephen F. Austin	4	–	2	–	0	6	–	3	–	0
Texas A&I	4	–	2	–	0	6	–	3	–	0
East Texas State	2	–	4	–	0	4	–	5	–	0
Sam Houston State	1	–	4	–	0	4	–	6	–	0
Howard Payne	0	–	6	–	0	2	–	8	–	0
McMurry	0	–	0	–	0	4	–	5	–	1
$ – Conference champion; ^ – NAIA playoff participant; Rankings from NAIA poll

The 1965 East Texas State Lions football team represented East Texas State University in the 1965 NAIA football season. They were led by Ernest Hawkins, who was in his second season. The Lions played their home games at Memorial Stadium and were members of the Lone Star Conference. The Lions finished the season with a 4–5 record.

== Schedule ==
Date	Opponent	Site	Result	Attendance	Source
September 18	Abilene Christian*	Memorial Stadium; Commerce, TX	W 21–20	6,000	
September 25	at Texas Lutheran*	Matador Stadium; Seguin, TX	W 13–6		
October 2	Arlington State*	Memorial Stadium; Commerce, TX	L 6–20	9,500–10,000	
October 16	at Texas A&I	Javelina Stadium; Kingsville, TX	L 12–26	8,700	
October 23	Sul Ross	Memorial Stadium; Commerce, TX	L 7–35		
October 30	at Howard Payne	Lion Stadium; Brownwood, TX	W 28–14		
November 6	Sam Houston State	Memorial Stadium; Commerce, TX	W 7–0	9,000	
November 13	Southwest Texas State	Memorial Stadium; Commerce, TX	L 16–24	5,100	
November 20	Stephen F. Austin	Memorial Stadium; Commerce, TX	L 20–28		
*Non-conference game

== Postseason awards ==
=== All-Americans ===
- Curtis Guyton, Third Team, running back

=== All-Lone Star Conference ===
==== LSC First Team ====
- John Jones, defensive tackle

==== LSC Honorable Mention ====
- Jerry Jolley, defensive back
- Wardell Richardson, defensive line
