= 1965 Prairie View A&M Panthers football team =

American college football season

1965 Prairie View A&M Panthers football
- Conference: Southwestern Athletic Conference
- Record: 5–3–1 (3–3–1 SWAC)
- Head coach: Billy Nicks (17th season)
- Home stadium: Edward L. Blackshear Field

1965 Southwestern Athletic Conference football standings
	Conf.					Overall
Team	W		L		T	W		L		T
No. 13 Grambling $	6	–	1	–	0	8	–	3	–	0
Southern	4	–	2	–	1	5	–	4	–	1
Texas Southern	4	–	2	–	1	5	–	4	–	1
Jackson State	3	–	3	–	1	5	–	3	–	1
Prairie View A&M	3	–	3	–	1	5	–	3	–	1
Arkansas AM&N	3	–	3	–	1	4	–	5	–	1
Alcorn A&M	2	–	4	–	1	3	–	5	–	1
Wiley	0	–	7	–	0	1	–	7	–	0
$ – Conference champion; Rankings from UPI small college poll

The 1965 Prairie View A&M Panthers football team represented Prairie View A&M College of Texas (now known as Prairie View A&M University) as a member of the Southwestern Athletic Conference (SWAC) during the 1965 NCAA College Division football season. Led by 17th-year head coach Billy Nicks, the Panthers compiled an overall record of 5–3–1, with a conference record of 3–3–1, and finished tied for fourth in the SWAC.

== Schedule ==
Date	Opponent	Site	Result	Attendance	Source
September 18	Jackson State	Edward L. Blackshear Field; Prairie View, TX	T 7–7	8,500	
September 25	Southern	Edward L. Blackshear Field; Prairie View, TX	L 13–28		
October 2	at Grambling	Grambling Stadium; Grambling, LA	L 7–44	23,000	
October 18	vs. Wiley	Cotton Bowl; Dallas, TX (State Fair Classic)	W 16–7	5,000	
October 23	at Arkansas AM&N	Pumphrey Stadium; Pine Bluff, AR	W 24–14		
October 30	at Edward Waters*	Wolfson Stadium; Jacksonville, FL	W 18–10		
November 6	Bishop*	Edward L. Blackshear Field; Prairie View, TX	W 19–0		
November 13	at Alcorn A&M	Henderson Stadium; Lorman, MS	W 17–14		
November 20	at Texas Southern	Jeppesen Stadium; Houston, TX (rivalry)	L 0–16		
*Non-conference game
