= 1965 Wiley Wildcats football team =

American college football season

1965 Wiley Wildcats football
- Conference: Southwestern Athletic Conference
- Record: 1–7 (0–7 SWAC)
- Head coach: Fred T. Long (35th season)
- Home stadium: Wildcat Stadium

1965 Southwestern Athletic Conference football standings
| | Conf. | | | | | Overall |
| Team | W | | L | | T | W | | L | | T |
|---|---|---|---|---|---|---|---|---|---|---|
| No. 13 Grambling $ | 6 | – | 1 | – | 0 | 8 | – | 3 | – | 0 |
| Southern | 4 | – | 2 | – | 1 | 5 | – | 4 | – | 1 |
| Texas Southern | 4 | – | 2 | – | 1 | 5 | – | 4 | – | 1 |
| Jackson State | 3 | – | 3 | – | 1 | 5 | – | 3 | – | 1 |
| Prairie View A&M | 3 | – | 3 | – | 1 | 5 | – | 3 | – | 1 |
| Arkansas AM&N | 3 | – | 3 | – | 1 | 4 | – | 5 | – | 1 |
| Alcorn A&M | 2 | – | 4 | – | 1 | 3 | – | 5 | – | 1 |
| Wiley | 0 | – | 7 | – | 0 | 1 | – | 7 | – | 0 |
$ – Conference champion; Rankings from UPI small college poll

The 1965 Wiley Wildcats football team represented Wiley College as a member of the Southwestern Athletic Conference (SWAC) during the 1965 NCAA College Division football season. Led by 35th-year head coach Fred T. Long, the Wildcats compiled an overall record of 1–7, with a conference record of 0–7, and finished eighth in the SWAC.

== Schedule ==
| Date | Opponent | Site | Result | Attendance | Source |
|---|---|---|---|---|---|
| September 25 | at Texas Southern | Jeppesen Stadium; Houston, TX | L 0–28 | | |
| October 2 | Bishop* | Wildcat Stadium; Marshall, TX | W 14–6 | | |
| October 9 | at Alcorn A&M | Henderson Stadium; Lorman, MS | L 6–27 | | |
| October 18 | vs. Prairie View A&M | Cotton Bowl; Dallas, TX (State Fair Classic) | L 7–16 | 5,000 | |
| October 30 | Jackson State | Wildcat Stadium; Marshall, TX | L 14–35 | 1,620 | |
| November 6 | Southern | Wildcat Stadium; Marshall, TX | L 0–77 | | |
| November 13 | at Grambling | Grambling Stadium; Grambling, LA | L 14–72 | 21,000 | |
| November 20 | at Arkansas AM&N | Pumphrey Stadium; Pine Bluff, AR | L 7–51 | | |
*Non-conference game
