= 1965 Jackson State Tigers football team =

American college football season

1965 Jackson State Tigers football
- Conference: Southwestern Athletic Conference
- Record: 5–3–1 (3–3–1 SWAC)
- Head coach: Rod Paige (2nd season)
- Home stadium: Alumni Field

1965 Southwestern Athletic Conference football standings
| | Conf. | | | | | Overall |
| Team | W | | L | | T | W | | L | | T |
|---|---|---|---|---|---|---|---|---|---|---|
| No. 13 Grambling $ | 6 | – | 1 | – | 0 | 8 | – | 3 | – | 0 |
| Southern | 4 | – | 2 | – | 1 | 5 | – | 4 | – | 1 |
| Texas Southern | 4 | – | 2 | – | 1 | 5 | – | 4 | – | 1 |
| Jackson State | 3 | – | 3 | – | 1 | 5 | – | 3 | – | 1 |
| Prairie View A&M | 3 | – | 3 | – | 1 | 5 | – | 3 | – | 1 |
| Arkansas AM&N | 3 | – | 3 | – | 1 | 4 | – | 5 | – | 1 |
| Alcorn A&M | 2 | – | 4 | – | 1 | 3 | – | 5 | – | 1 |
| Wiley | 0 | – | 7 | – | 0 | 1 | – | 7 | – | 0 |
$ – Conference champion; Rankings from UPI small college poll

The 1965 Jackson State Tigers football team represented Jackson College for Negro Teachers (now known as Jackson State University) as a member of the Southwestern Athletic Conference (SWAC) during the 1965 NCAA College Division football season. Led by second-year head coach Rod Paige, the Tigers compiled an overall record of 5–3–1, with a conference record of 3–3–1, and finished tied for fourth in the SWAC.

== Schedule ==
| Date | Opponent | Site | Result | Attendance | Source |
|---|---|---|---|---|---|
| September 18 | at Prairie View A&M | Blackshear Field; Prairie View, TX | T 7–7 | 8,500 | |
| September 25 | Alcorn A&M | Alumni Field; Jackson, MS (rivalry) | W 21–6 | 9,300 | |
| October 2 | at Arkansas AM&N | Pumphrey Stadium; Pine Bluff, AR | W 24–21 | 3,500 | |
| October 9 | at Alabama State* | Hornet Stadium; Montgomery, AL | W 56–6 | 2,000 | |
| October 16 | Southern | Alumni Field; Jackson, MS (rivalry) | L 21–24 | 7,500 | |
| October 23 | Grambling | Alumni Field; Jackson, MS | L 20–51 | 6,400–21,000 | |
| October 30 | at Wiley | Wildcat Stadium; Marshall, TX | W 35–14 | 1,620 | |
| November 6 | at Texas Southern | Jeppesen Stadium; Houston, TX | L 14–26 | 6,150 | |
| November 20 | at Mississippi Valley State* | Magnolia Stadium; Itta Bena, MS | W 18–14 | 5,176 | |
*Non-conference game
