= 1965 Southern Jaguars football team =

American college football season

1965 Southern Jaguars football
- Conference: Southwestern Athletic Conference
- Record: 5–4–1 (4–2–1 SWAC)
- Head coach: Robert E. Smith (1st season)
- Home stadium: University Stadium

1965 Southwestern Athletic Conference football standings
	Conf.					Overall
Team	W		L		T	W		L		T
No. 13 Grambling $	6	–	1	–	0	8	–	3	–	0
Southern	4	–	2	–	1	5	–	4	–	1
Texas Southern	4	–	2	–	1	5	–	4	–	1
Jackson State	3	–	3	–	1	5	–	3	–	1
Prairie View A&M	3	–	3	–	1	5	–	3	–	1
Arkansas AM&N	3	–	3	–	1	4	–	5	–	1
Alcorn A&M	2	–	4	–	1	3	–	5	–	1
Wiley	0	–	7	–	0	1	–	7	–	0
$ – Conference champion; Rankings from UPI small college poll

The 1965 Southern Jaguars football team was an American football team that represented Southern University as a member of the Southwestern Athletic Conference (SWAC) during the 1965 NCAA College Division football season. Led by Robert E. Smith in his first season as head coach, the Jaguars compiled an overall record of 5–4–1, with a mark of 4–2–1 in conference play, and finished tied for second in the SWAC.

== Schedule ==
Date	Opponent	Site	Result	Attendance	Source
September 18	Texas Southern	University Stadium; Baton Rouge, LA	T 14–14		
September 25	at Prairie View A&M	Edward L. Blackshear Field; Prairie View, TX	W 28–13		
October 2	Morris Brown*	University Stadium; Baton Rouge, LA	W 28–0		
October 9	Arkansas AM&N	University Stadium; Baton Rouge, LA	L 15–24		
October 16	at Jackson State	Alumni Field; Jackson, MS (rivalry)	W 24–21	7,500	
October 24	Alcorn A&M	University Stadium; Baton Rouge, LA	W 41–7		
October 30	No. 9 Tennessee A&I*	University Stadium; Baton Rouge, LA	L 36–40	18,000	
November 6	at Wiley	Wildcat Stadium; Marshall, TX	W 77–0		
November 13	at Florida A&M*	Bragg Memorial Stadium; Tallahassee, FL	L 38–41	14,000	
November 20	at Grambling	Grambling Stadium; Grambling, LA (rivalry)	L 14–34	29,310–45,000	
*Non-conference game; Rankings from AP Poll released prior to the game
