= 1970 NAIA Division II football season =

American college football season

- Regular season: August–November 1970
- Postseason: November 29–December 12, 1970
- National Championship: Taggert Stadium, New Castle, PA
- Champions: Westminster (PA)

The 1970 NAIA Division II football season was the 15th season of college football sponsored by the NAIA and the first season of play of the NAIA's lower division for football. Prior to the season, the NAIA split its football competition into two separate championships: Divisions I and II.

The season was played from August to November 1970 and culminated in the 1970 NAIA Division II Football National Championship, played on December 13, 1970 at Taggert Stadium in New Castle, Pennsylvania .

The Westminster Titans defeated the Anderson Ravens in the championship game, 21–16, to win their first NAIA national title.

== Conference standings ==
1970 College Conference of Illinois and Wisconsin football standings
	Conf.					Overall
Team	W		L		T	W		L		T
No. 9 Carthage $	7	–	0	–	1	7	–	1	–	1
Carroll (WI)	7	–	1	–	0	8	–	1	–	0
Illinois Wesleyan	5	–	2	–	1	5	–	3	–	1
Millikin	5	–	3	–	0	5	–	4	–	0
Elmhurst	4	–	4	–	0	4	–	5	–	0
Augustana (IL)	2	–	5	–	0	3	–	6	–	0
North Park	2	–	5	–	1	2	–	6	–	1
Wheaton (IL)	1	–	6	–	1	1	–	7	–	1
North Central (IL)	0	–	8	–	0	1	–	8	–	0
$ – Conference champion; Rankings from NAIA Division II poll

1970 Frontier Conference football standings
	Conf.					Overall
Team	W		L		T	W		L		T
No. 8 Montana Tech $	5	–	0	–	0	9	–	1	–	0
Western Montana	3	–	2	–	0	6	–	2	–	0
Eastern Montana	3	–	2	–	0	4	–	5	–	0
Rocky Mountain	2	–	3	–	0	4	–	4	–	1
Carroll (MT)	2	–	3	–	0	3	–	5	–	0
Northern Montana	0	–	5	–	0	0	–	8	–	0
$ – Conference champion; Rankings from NAIA Division II poll

1970 Gateway Conference football standings
	Conf.					Overall
Team	W		L		T	W		L		T
Lakeland $	3	–	0	–	0	6	–	3	–	0
Northland	2	–	0	–	0	?	–	?	–	?
St. Procopius	2	–	1	–	0	6	–	3	–	0
Northwestern (WI)	1	–	3	–	0	?	–	?	–	?
Milton	0	–	4	–	0	0	–	7	–	1
$ – Conference champion

1970 Hoosier Conference football standings
	Conf.					Overall
Team	W		L		T	W		L		T
No. 2 Anderson (IN) +^	3	–	1	–	0	9	–	2	–	0
Earlham +	3	–	1	–	0	6	–	3	–	0
Manchester (IN)	2	–	2	–	0	4	–	4	–	0
Taylor	1	–	3	–	0	6	–	4	–	0
Hanover	1	–	3	–	0	2	–	7	–	0
+ – Conference co-champions; ^ – NAIA Division II playoff participant; Rankings from NAIA Division II poll

1970 Iowa Conference football standings
	Conf.					Overall
Team	W		L		T	W		L		T
Luther $	6	–	1	–	0	8	–	2	–	0
No. 17 Central (IA)	5	–	2	–	0	6	–	2	–	0
No. 18 Simpson (IA)	5	–	2	–	0	6	–	2	–	0
William Penn	5	–	2	–	0	6	–	3	–	0
Wartburg	3	–	4	–	0	3	–	6	–	0
Dubuque	2	–	5	–	0	2	–	7	–	0
Upper Iowa	1	–	6	–	0	1	–	6	–	1
Buena Vista	1	–	6	–	0	1	–	7	–	0
$ – Conference champion; Rankings from NAIA Division II poll

1970 Kansas Collegiate Athletic Conference football standings
	Conf.					Overall
Team	W		L		T	W		L		T
North Division
Ottawa xy$	5	–	0	–	0	7	–	2	–	1
Baker	4	–	1	–	0	4	–	4	–	0
No. 19 Kansas Wesleyan	3	–	2	–	0	7	–	2	–	0
Bethany	2	–	3	–	0	3	–	5	–	1
McPherson	1	–	4	–	0	1	–	8	–	0
Tabor	0	–	5	–	0	2	–	7	–	0
South Division
St. Mary of the Plains xy	4	–	1	–	0	5	–	5	–	0
Friends	3	–	2	–	0	5	–	3	–	1
Southwestern (KS)	3	–	2	–	0	5	–	3	–	1
Bethel (KS)	3	–	2	–	0	4	–	5	–	0
Sterling	2	–	3	–	0	4	–	4	–	1
College of Emporia	0	–	5	–	0	1	–	8	–	0
Championship: Ottawa 14, St. Mary of the Plains 12
$ – Conference champion; x – Division champion/co-champions; y – Championship game participant; Rankings from NAIA Division II poll

1970 Mid-Ohio Conference football standings
	Conf.					Overall
Team	W		L		T	W		L		T
No. 15 Defiance $	3	–	0	–	0	7	–	2	–	0
Findlay	2	–	1	–	0	3	–	6	–	0
Wilmington (OH)	1	–	2	–	0	4	–	4	–	1
Bluffton	0	–	3	–	0	0	–	9	–	0
$ – Conference champion; Rankings from NAIA Division II poll

1970 Midwest Conference football standings
	Conf.					Overall
Team	W		L		T	W		L		T
No. 18 St. Olaf $	8	–	0	–	0	9	–	0	–	0
Monmouth (IL)	7	–	1	–	0	8	–	1	–	0
Knox	5	–	3	–	0	6	–	3	–	0
Ripon	5	–	3	–	0	6	–	3	–	0
Grinnell	4	–	4	–	0	5	–	4	–	0
Cornell (IA)	3	–	5	–	0	4	–	5	–	0
Coe	2	–	6	–	0	3	–	6	–	0
Lawrence	2	–	6	–	0	3	–	6	–	0
Carleton	0	–	8	–	0	1	–	8	–	0
Beloit			–			0	–	9	–	0
$ – Conference champion; Beloit was allowed to compete with freshmen. Games with Beloit were not counted in the conference standings.; Rankings from AP small college poll

1970 Minnesota Intercollegiate Athletic Conference football standings
	Conf.					Overall
Team	W		L		T	W		L		T
Concordia–Moorhead $	6	–	1	–	0	7	–	2	–	1
No. 14 Gustavus Adolphus	5	–	2	–	0	8	–	2	–	0
Saint John's (MN)	5	–	2	–	0	6	–	3	–	0
Minnesota–Duluth	4	–	2	–	1	7	–	2	–	1
Hamline	3	–	4	–	0	6	–	4	–	0
Macalester	2	–	4	–	1	3	–	5	–	1
Augsburg	1	–	6	–	0	1	–	8	–	0
St. Thomas (MN)	1	–	6	–	0	1	–	9	–	0
$ – Conference champion; Rankings from NAIA Division I poll

1970 Missouri College Athletic Union football standings
	Conf.					Overall
Team	W		L		T	W		L		T
No. 10 Missouri Valley $	4	–	0	–	0	8	–	2	–	0
William Jewell	4	–	1	–	0	7	–	4	–	0
Tarkio	3	–	2	–	0	5	–	4	–	0
Central Methodist	2	–	3	–	0	3	–	6	–	0
Culver–Stockton	1	–	3	–	0	6	–	3	–	0
Graceland	0	–	5	–	0	1	–	8	–	0
$ – Conference champion; Rankings from NAIA Division II poll

1970 Nebraska College Conference football standings
	Conf.					Overall
Team	W		L		T	W		L		T
No. 16 Wayne State (NE) $	3	–	0	–	0	7	–	3	–	0
Kearney State	2	–	1	–	0	8	–	2	–	0
Chadron State	1	–	2	–	0	5	–	4	–	0
Peru State	0	–	3	–	0	2	–	8	–	0
$ – Conference champion; Rankings from NAIA Division II poll

1970 Nebraska Intercollegiate Athletic Conference football standings
	Conf.					Overall
Team	W		L		T	W		L		T
No. 13 Concordia (NE) $	5	–	0	–	0	8	–	1	–	0
No. T–20 Hastings	4	–	1	–	0	7	–	1	–	0
Doane	2	–	3	–	0	6	–	4	–	0
Nebraska Wesleyan	2	–	3	–	0	6	–	4	–	0
Dana	2	–	3	–	0	3	–	6	–	0
Midland	0	–	5	–	0	1	–	8	–	0
$ – Conference champion; ^ – NAIA Division II playoff participant; Rankings from NAIA Division II poll

1970 North Dakota College Athletic Conference football standings
	Conf.					Overall
Team	W		L		T	W		L		T
No. 5 Minot State $^	5	–	0	–	0	8	–	1	–	0
Wahpeton Science	4	–	1	–	0	7	–	2	–	0
Jamestown	2	–	3	–	0	4	–	4	–	0
Dickinson State	2	–	3	–	0	2	–	6	–	0
Mayville State	2	–	3	–	0	2	–	6	–	0
Valley City State	0	–	5	–	0	0	–	8	–	0
$ – Conference champion; ^ – NAIA Division II playoff participant; Rankings from NAIA Division II poll

1970 Northwest Conference football standings
	Conf.					Overall
Team	W		L		T	W		L		T
No. 8 Linfield $	6	–	0	–	0	8	–	1	–	0
Pacific Lutheran	4	–	2	–	0	6	–	3	–	0
Lewis & Clark	4	–	2	–	0	5	–	4	–	0
Willamette	3	–	3	–	0	4	–	4	–	0
Whitman	3	–	3	–	0	4	–	5	–	0
College of Idaho	1	–	5	–	0	2	–	7	–	0
Pacific (OR)	0	–	6	–	0	0	–	8	–	0
$ – Conference champion; Rankings from NAIA Division I poll

1970 Pennsylvania State Athletic Conference football standings
	Conf.					Overall
Team	W		L		T	W		L		T
East Division
West Chester xy	5	–	0	–	0	7	–	4	–	0
East Stroudsburg	4	–	2	–	0	5	–	4	–	0
Kutztown	4	–	2	–	0	5	–	3	–	0
Bloomsburg	3	–	3	–	0	5	–	3	–	0
Millersville	3	–	3	–	0	4	–	5	–	0
Mansfield	1	–	5	–	0	2	–	7	–	0
Cheyney	0	–	5	–	0	0	–	9	–	0
West Division
No. 3 Edinboro xy$^	5	–	0	–	0	9	–	1	–	0
Clarion	3	–	2	–	0	5	–	3	–	0
California (PA)	3	–	2	–	0	5	–	4	–	0
Slippery Rock	2	–	3	–	0	4	–	5	–	0
Shippensburg	2	–	3	–	0	3	–	5	–	0
Lock Haven	0	–	5	–	0	1	–	7	–	0
Championship: Edinboro 14, West Chester 34
$ – Conference champion; x – Division champion/co-champions; y – Championship game participant; ^ – NAIA Division II playoff participantpoll=NAIA Division II poll; Rankings from AP Poll

1970 Southern California Intercollegiate Athletic Conference football standings
	Conf.					Overall
Team	W		L		T	W		L		T
Claremont-Mudd +	3	–	1	–	0	8	–	1	–	0
Redlands +	3	–	1	–	0	6	–	4	–	0
Pomona	2	–	2	–	0	6	–	3	–	0
Whittier	2	–	2	–	0	4	–	6	–	0
Occidental	0	–	4	–	0	2	–	7	–	0
+ – Conference co-champions

1970 Southern Intercollegiate Athletic Conference football standings
	Conf.					Overall
Team	W		L		T	W		L		T
Division I
No. 4 Tuskegee x	4	–	1	–	0	9	–	1	–	0
Florida A&M x	4	–	1	–	0	5	–	5	–	0
Alabama State	3	–	2	–	0	6	–	4	–	0
Morris Brown	3	–	2	–	0	4	–	5	–	0
Alabama A&M	2	–	3	–	0	4	–	5	–	0
Albany State	2	–	3	–	0	4	–	6	–	0
Bethune–Cookman	1	–	4	–	0	5	–	4	–	0
South Carolina State	1	–	4	–	0	3	–	6	–	0
Division II
Fort Valley State x	4	–	1	–	0	7	–	2	–	0
Fisk x	4	–	1	–	0	5	–	2	–	0
Savannah State	3	–	2	–	0	3	–	5	–	0
Lane	3	–	2	–	0	3	–	7	–	0
Morehouse	1	–	4	–	0	3	–	6	–	0
Clark (GA)	1	–	4	–	0	2	–	6	–	0
Knoxville	1	–	4	–	0	1	–	6	–	0
x – Division champion/co-champions; Rankings from NAIA Division II poll

1970 Tri-State Conference football standings
	Conf.					Overall
Team	W		L		T	W		L		T
No. 14 Yankton $	6	–	0	–	0	8	–	2	–	0
No. 13 Concordia (NE)	5	–	1	–	0	8	–	1	–	0
Northwestern (IA)	4	–	2	–	0	6	–	3	–	0
Westmar	3	–	3	–	0	5	–	4	–	0
Dana	2	–	4	–	0	3	–	6	–	0
Midland	1	–	5	–	0	1	–	8	–	0
Sioux Falls	0	–	6	–	0	0	–	9	–	0
$ – Conference champion; Rankings from NAIA Division II poll

1970 NAIA Division II independents football records
	Conf.			Overall
Team	W	L	T	W		L		T
No. 1 Westminster (PA) ^		–		10	–	0	–	0
No. 6 Simon Fraser		–		8	–	0	–	0
No. T–20 Frostburg State		–		7	–	1	–	0
No. 7 Cal Lutheran		–		8	–	1	–	1
Franklin (IN)		–		7	–	3	–	0
Georgetown (KY)		–		6	–	3	–	0
Eureka		–		5	–	3	–	0
Grove City		–		5	–	3	–	1
Iowa Wesleyan		–		5	–	4	–	0
Waynesburg		–		5	–	4	–	0
Texas Lutheran		–		5	–	4	–	1
Azusa Pacific		–		3	–	5	–	0
Oklahoma Panhandle State		–		4	–	7	–	0
Austin		–		3	–	6	–	0
Missouri Southern		–		2	–	7	–	1
Geneva		–		1	–	8	–	0
Missouri Western		–		1	–	8	–	0
^ – NAIA Division II playoff participant; Rankings from NAIA Division II poll

== Postseason ==
Semifinals; November 28, 1970
Edinboro	7
Westminster (PA)*	20
Minot State	14
Anderson (IN)*	20

Championship; December 12, 1970; New Castle, PA
Westminster (PA)*	21
Anderson (IN)	16

== See also ==
- 1970 NAIA Division I football season
- 1970 NCAA University Division football season
- 1970 NCAA College Division football season
