= Henderson Stadium (Alcorn State) =

Stadium in Lorman, Mississippi, US

- Interactive map of Henderson Stadium
- Full name: Henderson Stadium
- Location: Lorman, Mississippi
- Coordinates: 31°52′33″N 91°8′18″W
- Owner: Alcorn State University
- Operator: Alcorn State University
- Capacity: 10,000

Construction
- Opened: 1925

Tenant
- Alcorn State Braves football

Henderson Stadium is a stadium in Lorman, Mississippi. It hosted the Alcorn State University Braves football team until the school moved to Jack Spinks Stadium in 1992. The stadium held 10,000 people at its peak. It currently hosts the school's track and field squad.
