= 1968 New York Jets season =

American Football League season

- Owner: Leon Hess
- General manager: Weeb Ewbank
- Head coach: Weeb Ewbank
- Home stadium: Shea Stadium

Results
- Record: 11–3
- Division place: 1st AFL East
- Playoffs: Won AFL Championship (vs. Raiders) 27–23; Won Super Bowl III (vs. Colts) 16–7
- Pro Bowlers: MLB Al Atkinson; RDE Verlon Biggs; HB Emerson Boozer; RDT John Elliott; RG Dave Herman; LT Winston Hill; FL Don Maynard; QB Joe Namath; LDE Gerry Philbin; SE George Sauer; K Jim Turner

The 1968 New York Jets season was the ninth season for the team in the American Football League (AFL), and the most successful season in franchise history. Trying to improve upon their 8–5–1 record of 1967, the Jets won the AFL Eastern Division with an 11–3 record. They defeated the defending champion Oakland Raiders, 27–23, in the AFL championship game, earning the right to play in Super Bowl III against the NFL champion Baltimore Colts. After fourth-year quarterback Joe Namath announced a "guarantee" of victory, the Jets defeated the heavily favored Colts, 16–7. The Jets did not appear in a semi-final playoff round again until 1983, and they have never returned to the Super Bowl; their ongoing drought of 57 complete seasons is the longest in NFL history. They and the New Orleans Saints are the only teams to have won their lone championship game.

In 2007, NFL Network aired America's Game: The Super Bowl Champions, the 1968 New York Jets, with team commentary from Joe Namath, Gerry Philbin and Don Maynard, and was narrated by Alec Baldwin. The Jets ranked No. 24 on the 100 greatest teams of all time presented by the NFL on its 100th anniversary. Of those 24, only three came before the AFL-NFL Merger. The Jets were the highest-ranked team that played in the AFL, and also the highest pre-merger team not coached by Vince Lombardi.

The last active member of the 1968 New York Jets was guard Randy Rasmussen, who retired after the 1981 NFL season.

== Offseason ==
On May 21, Sonny Werblin sold his shares in the Jets to his partners Donald C. Lillis, Leon Hess, Townsend Martin, and Philip H. Iselin. Lillis became the president on May 21, but died on July 23, and Isselin was appointed president on August 6. Leon Hess the founder of Hess gas station made the famous Hess truck after the New York Jets color scheme

== Draft ==
1968 New York Jets draft
Round	Pick	Player	Position	College	Notes
1	17	Lee White	RB	Weber St	
2	44	Steve Thompson	DE	Washington	
3	72	Sam Walton	OT	East Texas St	
4	101	Gary Magner	DT	USC	
5	128	Lee Jacobsen	LB	Kearney St	
7	182	Oscar Lubke	OT	Ball St	
8	200	Bob Taylor	RB	Maryland Eastern Shore	Pick from MIA
8	210	Jim Richards	DB	Virginia Tech	
8	214	Karl Henke	DT	Tulsa	Pick from HOU
9	236	Gary Houser	TE	Oregon St	
10	264	Mike D'Amato	DB	Hofstra	
11	290	Henry Owens	WR	Weber St	
12	318	Ray Hayes	OT	Toledo	
13	344	Tom Myslinski	OG	Maryland	
14	372	Harvey Naim	RB	Southern	
15	398	Ronnie Ehrig	DB	Texas	
16	426	Tom Bilotta	OG	Adams St (CO)	
17	452	Myles Strasser	RB	Wisconsin−Oshkosh	
Made roster † Pro Football Hall of Fame * Made at least one Pro Bowl during career

== Personnel ==
=== Staff ===
1968 New York Jets staff
Front office: Majority Owner/Team President/CEO & Chairman – Leon Hess; Vice President/board member/Minority Owner – Donald C. Lillis; General manager – Weeb Ewbank; Head coaches: Head Coach – Weeb Ewbank; Offensive coaches: Offensive coordinator – Clive Rush; Offensive line coach – Joe Spencer	Defensive coaches: Defensive coordinator – Walt Michaels; Defensive line coach – Buddy Ryan

=== Roster ===
1968 New York Jets roster
Quarterbacks (QB): 12 Joe Namath; 15 Babe Parilli; Running backs (RB): 32 Emerson Boozer; 31 Bill Mathis; 30 Mark Smolinski; 41 Matt Snell; Wide receivers (WR): 13 Don Maynard; 23 Bill Rademacher; 83 George Sauer; 29 Bake Turner; Tight ends (TE): 87 Pete Lammons	Offensive linemen (OL): 67 Dave Herman G; 75 Winston Hill T; 66 Randy Rasmussen G; 74 Jeff Richardson C/T; 52 John Schmitt C; 61 Bob Talamini G; 71 Sam Walton T; Defensive linemen (DL): 86 Verlon Biggs DE; 80 John Elliott DT; 50 Carl McAdams DE/DT; 81 Gerry Philbin DE; 72 Paul Rochester DT; 85 Steve Thompson DE	Linebackers (LB): 62 Al Atkinson MLB; 51 Ralph Baker OLB; 56 Paul Crane OLB; 60 Larry Grantham OLB; 63 John Neidert MLB; Defensive backs (DB): 46 Bill Baird FS; 42 Randy Beverly CB; 45 Earl Christy CB; 47 Mike D'Amato SS; 43 John Dockery CB; 48 Cornell Gordon FS/CB; 22 Jim Hudson SS; 26 Jim Richards CB/S; 24 Johnny Sample CB; Special teams (ST): 33 Curley Johnson P/TE; 11 Jim Turner K	Taxi squad: -- Tony DiMidio T; 73 Ray Hayes DT; 70 Karl Henke DE; Reserve: 35 Billy Joe RB (IR); 82 Gary Magner DE (IR); -- Paul Seiler (Military); 68 Michael Stromberg LB (IR); 34 Lee White RB (IR); Rookies in italics

== Preseason ==
=== Schedule ===
Week	Date	Opponent	Result	Record	Venue	Attendance	Recap
1	August 12	at Houston Oilers	L 14–28	0–1	Astrodome	40,354	Recap
2	August 17	Boston Patriots	W 25–6	1–1	City Stadium	14,000	Recap
3	August 23	Atlanta Falcons	W 27–12	2–1	Legion Field	27,406	Recap
4	August 30	Cincinnati Bengals	L 9–13	2–2	Liberty Bowl Memorial Stadium	24,358	Recap
5	September 7	Detroit Lions	W 9–6	3–2	Cleveland Municipal Stadium	84,918	Recap

== Regular season ==
=== Regular season schedule ===
Week	Date	Opponent	Result	Record	Venue	Attendance	Recap
1	Bye						
2	September 15	at Kansas City Chiefs	**W** 20–19	1–0	Municipal Stadium	48,871	Recap
3	September 22	**Boston Patriots**	**W** 47–31	2–0	Legion Field, Birmingham, AL	29,192	Recap
4	September 29	at **Buffalo Bills**	**L** 35–37	2–1	War Memorial Stadium	38,044	Recap
5	October 5	San Diego Chargers	**W** 23–20	3–1	Shea Stadium	63,786	Recap
6	October 13	Denver Broncos	**L** 13–21	3–2	Shea Stadium	63,052	Recap
7	October 20	at **Houston Oilers**	**W** 20–14	4–2	Astrodome	51,710	Recap
8	October 27	**Boston Patriots**	**W** 48–14	5–2	Shea Stadium	62,351	Recap
9	November 3	**Buffalo Bills**	**W** 25–21	6–2	Shea Stadium	61,452	Recap
10	November 10	**Houston Oilers**	**W** 26–7	7–2	Shea Stadium	60,242	Recap
11	November 17	at Oakland Raiders	**L** 32–43	7–3	Oakland–Alameda County Coliseum	53,318	Recap
12	November 24	at San Diego Chargers	**W** 37–15	8–3	San Diego Stadium	51,175	Recap
13	December 1	**Miami Dolphins**	**W** 35–17	9–3	Shea Stadium	61,766	Recap
14	December 8	Cincinnati Bengals	**W** 27–14	10–3	Shea Stadium	61,111	Recap
15	December 15	at **Miami Dolphins**	**W** 31–7	11–3	Orange Bowl	32,843	Recap
Note: Intra-division opponents are in **bold** text.

== Standings ==
AFL Eastern Division
	W	L	T	PCT	DIV	PF	PA	STK
New York Jets	11	3	0	.786	7–1	419	280	W4
Houston Oilers	7	7	0	.500	5–3	303	248	W2
Miami Dolphins	5	8	1	.385	4–3–1	276	355	L1
Boston Patriots	4	10	0	.286	2–6	229	406	L2
Buffalo Bills	1	12	1	.077	1–6–1	199	367	L8

Note: Tie games were not officially counted in the standings in the AFL.

=== Game summaries ===
==== Week 2: at Kansas City Chiefs ====
Week 2: New York Jets at Kansas City Chiefs – Game summary

Quarter	1	2	3	4	Total
Jets	7	10	0	3	20
Chiefs	3	7	3	6	19

at Municipal Stadium, Kansas City, Missouri

- Date: September 15, 1968
- Game time: 4:00 p.m. EDT
- Game weather: 71 °F (22 °C), relative humidity 57%, wind 12 mph (19 km/h)
- Game attendance: 48,871
- TV announcers (NBC): Curt Gowdy (play-by-play), Kyle Rote (color commentator)
- Box Score

Game information

First quarter

- NYJ – Don Maynard 57-yard pass from Joe Namath (Jim Turner kick). Jets 7–0.
- KC – Jan Stenerud 33-yard field goal. Jets 7–3.

Second quarter

- NYJ – Jim Turner 22-yard field goal. Jets 10–3.
- NYJ – Don Maynard 30-yard pass from Joe Namath (Jim Turner kick). Jets 17–3.

Third quarter

- KC – Noland Smith 80-yard punt return (Jan Stenerud kick). Jets 17–10.
- KC – Jan Stenerud 18-yard field goal. Jets 17–13.

Fourth quarter

- KC – Jan Stenerud 22-yard field goal. Jets 17–16.
- NYJ – Jim Turner 42-yard field goal. Jets 20–16.
- KC – Jan Stenerud 28-yard field goal. Jets 20–19.

Top passers

- NYJ – Joe Namath – 17/29, 302 yards, 2 TD, INT
- KC – Len Dawson – 12/20, 98 yards

Top rushers

- NYJ – Emerson Boozer – 18 rushes, 75 yards
- KC – Bert Coan – 11 rushes, 45 yards

Top receivers

- NYJ – Don Maynard – 8 receptions, 203 yards, 2 TD
- KC – Otis Taylor – 5 receptions, 42 yards

==== Week 3: at Boston Patriots ====
Week 3: New York Jets at Boston Patriots

Quarter	1	2	3	4	Total
Jets	14	6	17	10	47
Patriots	3	7	7	14	31

at Legion Field, Birmingham, Alabama

- Date: September 22, 1968
- Game time: 4:00 p.m. EDT
- Game weather: 73 °F (23 °C), relative humidity 69%, wind 8 mph (13 km/h)
- Game attendance: 29,192
- TV announcers (NBC): Curt Gowdy (play-by-play), Kyle Rote (color commentator)
- Box Score

Game information

First quarter

- NYJ – Randy Beverly 68-yard interception return (Jim Turner kick). Jets 7–0.
- BOS – Gino Cappelletti 31-yard field goal. Jets 7–3.
- NYJ – Don Maynard 39-yard pass from Joe Namath (Jim Turner kick). Jets 14–3.

Second quarter

- NYJ – Jim Turner 30-yard field goal. Jets 17–3.
- NYJ – Jim Turner 27-yard field goal. Jets 20–3.
- BOS – Aaron Marsh 70-yard pass from Mike Taliaferro (Gino Cappelletti kick). Jets 20–10.

Third quarter

- BOS – Mel Witt 4-yard interception return (Gino Cappelletti kick). Jets 20–17.
- NYJ – Mark Smolinski 3-yard blocked punt return (Jim Turner kick). Jets 27–17.
- NYJ – Pete Lammons 29-yard pass from Joe Namath (Jim Turner kick). Jets 34–17.
- NYJ – Jim Turner 27-yard field goal. Jets 37–17.

Fourth quarter

- NYJ – Emerson Boozer 1-yard run (Jim Turner kick). Jets 44–17.
- BOS – Ed Philpott 10-yard fumble return (Gino Cappelletti kick). Jets 44–24.
- NYJ – Jim Turner 48-yard field goal. Jets 47–24.
- BOS – Gene Thomas 1-yard run (Gino Cappelletti kick). Jets 47–31.

Top passers

- NYJ – Joe Namath – 13/25, 196 yards, 2 TD, INT
- BOS – Mike Taliaferro – 17/30, 276 yards, TD, 4 INT

Top rushers

- NYJ – Emerson Boozer – 8 rushes, 52 yards, TD
- BOS – Jim Nance – 14 rushes, 25 yards

Top receivers

- NYJ – George Sauer – 5 receptions, 76 yards
- BOS – Aaron Marsh – 4 receptions, 140 yards, TD

==== Week 4: at Buffalo Bills ====
This game, won by the Buffalo Bills at the old War Memorial Stadium (known as the rock pile) in Buffalo was the only win for the Bills all season. A win over the eventual Super Bowl champions.

Week 4: New York Jets at Buffalo Bills

Quarter	1	2	3	4	Total
Jets (2–1)	7	14	0	14	35
Bills (1–3)	10	10	3	14	37

at War Memorial Stadium, Buffalo, New York

- Date: September 29, 1968
- Game time: 1:30 p.m. EDT
- Game weather: 53 °F (12 °C), relative humidity 71%, wind 7 mph (11 km/h)
- Game attendance: 38,044
- TV announcers (NBC): Jim Simpson (play-by-play), Al DeRogatis (color commentator)
- Box Score

Scoring summary

Quarter	Time	Drive			Team	Scoring information	Score	
Quarter	Time	Plays	Yards	TOP	Team	Scoring information	Jets	Bills
1					Jets	Sauer 4-yard touchdown reception from Namath, Turner kick good	7	0
1					Bills	35-yard field goal by Alford	7	3
1					Bills	Gregory 2-yard touchdown run, Alford kick good	7	10
2		—	—	—	Bills	Interception returned 100 yards for touchdown by Janik, Alford kick good	7	17
2					Jets	Boozer 1-yard touchdown run, Turner kick good	14	17
2					Bills	41-yard field goal by Alford	14	20
2					Jets	Maynard 55-yard touchdown reception from Namath, Turner kick good	21	20
3					Bills	37-yard field goal by Alford	21	23
4		—	—	—	Bills	Interception returned 53 yards for touchdown by Byrd, Alford kick good	21	30
4		—	—	—	Bills	Interception returned 45 yards for touchdown by Edgderson, Alford kick good	21	37
4					Jets	Snell 3-yard touchdown reception from Namath, Turner kick good	28	37
4					Jets	Sauer 10-yard touchdown reception from Namath, Turner kick good	35	37
"TOP" = time of possession. For other American football terms, see Glossary of American football.							35	37

==== Week 5: vs. San Diego Chargers ====
Week 5: San Diego Chargers at New York Jets

Quarter	1	2	3	4	Total
Chargers (3–1)	0	7	6	7	20
Jets (3–1)	3	6	7	7	23

at Shea Stadium, Flushing, New York

- Date: October 5, 1968
- Game time: 8:00 p.m. EDT
- Game weather: 53 °F (12 °C), relative humidity 48%, wind 15 mph (24 km/h)
- Game attendance: 63,786
- Box Score

Scoring summary

Quarter	Time	Drive			Team	Scoring information	Score	
Quarter	Time	Plays	Yards	TOP	Team	Scoring information	Chargers	Jets
1					Jets	26-yard field goal by Turner	0	3
2					Chargers	Alworth 7-yard touchdown reception from Hadl, Partee kick good	7	3
2					Jets	45-yard field goal by Turner	7	6
2					Jets	11-yard field goal by Turner	7	9
3					Jets	Snell 1-yard touchdown run, Turner kick good	7	16
3					Chargers	Garrison 84-yard touchdown run, Partee kick no good	13	16
4					Chargers	Garrison 5-yard touchdown reception from Hadl, Partee kick good	20	16
4					Jets	Boozer 1-yard touchdown run, Turner kick good	20	23
"TOP" = time of possession. For other American football terms, see Glossary of American football.							20	23

==== Week 6: vs. Denver Broncos ====
Week 6: Denver Broncos at New York Jets

Quarter	1	2	3	4	Total
Broncos (2–3)	7	7	7	0	21
Jets (3–2)	7	3	0	3	13

at Shea Stadium, Flushing, New York

- Date: October 13, 1968
- Game time: 1:30 p.m. EDT
- Game weather: 64 °F (18 °C), relative humidity 71%, wind 8 mph (13 km/h)
- Game attendance: 63,052
- TV announcers (NBC): Charlie Jones (play-by-play), Al DeRogatis (color commentator)
- Box Score

Scoring summary

Quarter	Time	Drive			Team	Scoring information	Score	
Quarter	Time	Plays	Yards	TOP	Team	Scoring information	Broncos	Jets
1	6:27				Jets	Boozer 5-yard touchdown run, Turner kick good	0	7
1	1:04				Broncos	Lynch 4-yard touchdown run, Howfield kick good	7	7
2	8:56				Broncos	Lynch 6-yard touchdown run, Howfield kick good	14	7
2	4:37				Jets	29-yard field goal by Turner	14	10
3	0:36				Broncos	Crabtree 72-yard touchdown reception from Tensi, Howfield kick good	21	10
4	13:05				Jets	24-yard field goal by Turner	21	13
"TOP" = time of possession. For other American football terms, see Glossary of American football.							21	13

==== Week 7: at Houston Oilers ====
Week 7: New York Jets at Houston Oilers

Quarter	1	2	3	4	Total
Jets (4–2)	2	8	0	10	20
Oilers (2–5)	0	0	0	14	14

at Astrodome, Houston, Texas

- Date: October 20, 1968
- Game time: 4:00 p.m. EDT
- Game weather: indoors (dome)
- Game attendance: 51,710
- TV announcers (NBC): Curt Gowdy (play-by-play), Kyle Rote (color commentator)
- Box Score

Scoring summary

Quarter	Time	Drive			Team	Scoring information	Score	
Quarter	Time	Plays	Yards	TOP	Team	Scoring information	Jets	Oilers
1		—	—	—	Jets	Norton punt blocked through the end zone by Crane for a safety	2	0
2					Jets	Namath 1-yard touchdown run, 2-point pass good, Namath to Mathis	10	0
4					Jets	12-yard field goal by Turner	13	0
4					Oilers	Reed 9-yard touchdown reception from Trull, Walker kick good	13	7
4					Oilers	Beirne 19-yard touchdown reception from Trull, Walker kick good	13	14
4					Jets	Snell 2-yard touchdown run, Turner kick good	20	14
"TOP" = time of possession. For other American football terms, see Glossary of American football.							20	14

==== Week 8: vs. Boston Patriots ====
Week 8: Boston Patriots at New York Jets

Quarter	1	2	3	4	Total
Patriots (3–4)	0	0	0	14	14
Jets (5–2)	7	3	10	28	48

at Shea Stadium, Flushing, New York

- Date: October 27, 1968
- Game time: 1:30 p.m. EST
- Game weather: 50 °F (10 °C), relative humidity 48%, wind 16 mph (26 km/h)
- Game attendance: 62,351
- TV announcers (NBC): Jim Simpson (play-by-play), Al DeRogatis (color commentator)
- Box Score

Scoring summary

Quarter	Time	Drive			Team	Scoring information	Score	
Quarter	Time	Plays	Yards	TOP	Team	Scoring information	Patriots	Jets
1					Jets	Snell 2-yard touchdown run, Turner kick good	0	7
2					Jets	12-yard field goal by Turner	0	10
3					Jets	23-yard field goal by Turner	0	13
3					Jets	Snell 1-yard touchdown run, Turner kick good	0	20
4					Jets	Parilli 2-yard touchdown run, Turner kick good	0	27
4					Jets	Joe 7-yard touchdown run, Turner kick good	0	34
4					Jets	Joe 15-yard touchdown run, Turner kick good	0	41
2					Patriots	Whalen 87-yard touchdown reception from Sherman, Cappelletti kick good	7	41
4					Jets	Joe 32-yard touchdown run, Turner kick good	7	48
4					Patriots	Scarpitto 33-yard touchdown reception from Sherman, Cappelletti kick good	14	48
"TOP" = time of possession. For other American football terms, see Glossary of American football.							14	48

==== Week 9: vs. Buffalo Bills ====
Week 9: Buffalo Bills at New York Jets

Quarter	1	2	3	4	Total
Bills (1–7–1)	7	0	0	14	21
Jets (6–2)	3	13	3	6	25

at Shea Stadium, Flushing, New York

- Date: November 3, 1968
- Game time: 1:30 p.m. EST
- Game weather: 58 °F (14 °C), relative humidity 48%, wind 8 mph (13 km/h)
- Game attendance: 61,452
- TV announcers (NBC): Charlie Jones (play-by-play), Al DeRogatis (color commentator)
- Box Score

Scoring summary

Quarter	Time	Drive			Team	Scoring information	Score	
Quarter	Time	Plays	Yards	TOP	Team	Scoring information	Bills	Jets
1					Bills	Moses 55-yard touchdown reception from Stephenson, Alford kick good	7	0
1					Jets	32-yard field goal by Turner	7	3
2		—	—	—	Jets	Interception returned 36 yards for touchdown by Sample, Turner kick good	7	10
2					Jets	9-yard field goal by Turner	7	13
2					Jets	32-yard field goal by Turner	7	16
3					Jets	27-yard field goal by Turner	7	19
4					Bills	Costa 10-yard touchdown reception from Stephenson, Alford kick good	14	19
4		—	—	—	Bills	Punt returned 82 yards for touchdown by Clarke, Alford kick good	21	19
4					Jets	35-yard field goal by Turner	21	22
4					Jets	21-yard field goal by Turner	21	25
"TOP" = time of possession. For other American football terms, see Glossary of American football.							21	25

==== Week 10: vs. Houston Oilers ====
Week 10: Houston Oilers at New York Jets

Quarter	1	2	3	4	Total
Oilers (4–6)	7	0	0	0	7
Jets (7–2)	13	3	7	3	26

at Shea Stadium, Flushing, New York

- Date: November 10, 1968
- Game time: 1:30 p.m. EST
- Game weather: 42 °F (6 °C), relative humidity 81%, wind 17 mph (27 km/h)
- Game attendance: 60,242
- TV announcers (NBC): Bill Enis (play-by-play), Al DeRogatis (color commentator)
- Box Score

Scoring summary

Quarter	Time	Drive			Team	Scoring information	Score	
Quarter	Time	Plays	Yards	TOP	Team	Scoring information	Oilers	Jets
1					Jets	Mathis 2-yard touchdown run, Turner kick good	0	7
1					Jets	14-yard field goal by Turner	0	10
1					Jets	32-yard field goal by Turner	0	13
1					Oilers	Granger 47-yard touchdown run, Walker kick good	7	13
2					Jets	28-yard field goal by Turner	7	16
3					Jets	Mathis 1-yard touchdown run, Turner kick good	7	23
4					Jets	21-yard field goal by Turner	7	26
"TOP" = time of possession. For other American football terms, see Glossary of American football.							7	26

==== Week 11 at Oakland Raiders ====
The 1968 season also saw the Jets involved in one of the most notorious incidents in television history, an incident that would change the way television networks carried sporting events for decades to come. On November 17, 1968, just before 7:00 pm Eastern time, the Jets scored late to take a 32–29 lead over the Oakland Raiders with 1:05 left. NBC cut to a commercial, and then everywhere but the West Coast showed the movie Heidi, a show which NBC had promoted extensively for the sweeps period. Outraged fans bombarded NBC headquarters in New York with phone calls demanding the game be restored; so many phone calls were made that they eventually knocked out the NBC switchboard. Even though a decision was made to carry the game to conclusion, this decision could not be communicated, thus resulting in the movie starting on schedule.

Fans' ire was further fueled when they discovered that NBC's cutting away from the game denied them from seeing live a dramatic finish. On the Raiders' second play from scrimmage on the next drive, Daryle Lamonica threw a 46-yard touchdown pass to Charlie Smith, giving the Raiders a 36–32 lead. On the ensuing kickoff, Earl Christy of the Jets fumbled at the 10-yard line, which the Raiders' Preston Ridlehuber converted into another touchdown, ultimately giving the Raiders a 43–32 victory. Much of the country learned of this final outcome only via a bottom-of-screen crawl line shown during the movie. This incident, dubbed the Heidi Game, resulted in most television networks and sports leagues amending their television policies to ensure that games in progress would be broadcast to their conclusion, no matter what, even if it meant delaying or canceling the rest of the network's lineup, and even if the game's outcome seemed assured.

Week 11: New York Jets at Oakland Raiders

Quarter	1	2	3	4	Total
Jets (7–3)	6	6	7	13	32
Raiders (8–2)	7	7	8	21	43

at Oakland–Alameda County Coliseum, Oakland, California

- Date: November 17, 1968
- Game time: 4:00 p.m. EST
- Game weather: 60 °F (16 °C), relative humidity 0%, wind 0 mph (0 km/h), wind chill 0 °F (−18 °C)
- Game attendance: 53,318
- Referee: Bob Finley
- TV announcers (NBC): Curt Gowdy (play-by-play), Kyle Rote (color commentator)
- Box Score

Scoring summary

Quarter	Time	Drive			Team	Scoring information	Score	
Quarter	Time	Plays	Yards	TOP	Team	Scoring information	NYJ	OAK
1	7:42				Jets	44-yard field goal by Turner	3	0
1	5:23				Jets	18-yard field goal by Turner	6	0
1	2:32				Raiders	Wells 9-yard touchdown reception from Lamonica, Blanda kick good	6	7
2	13:34				Raiders	Cannon 48-yard touchdown reception from Lamonica, Blanda kick good	6	14
2	0:05				Jets	Namath 1-yard touchdown run, 2-point pass failed	12	14
3	9:59				Jets	Mathis 4-yard touchdown run, Turner kick good	19	14
3	1:46				Raiders	Smith 3-yard touchdown run, 2-point pass good	19	22
4	14:15				Jets	Maynard 50-yard touchdown reception from Namath, Turner kick good	26	22
4	8:49				Jets	12-yard field goal by Turner	29	22
4	3:10				Raiders	Biletnikoff 22-yard touchdown reception from Lamonica, Blanda kick good	29	29
4	1:05				Jets	26-yard field goal by Turner	32	29
4	0:42				Raiders	Smith 43-yard touchdown reception from Lamonica, Blanda kick good	32	36
4	0:33				Raiders	Fumble recovery returned 2 yards for touchdown by Ridlehuber, Blanda kick good	32	43
"TOP" = time of possession. For other American football terms, see Glossary of American football.							32	43

==== Week 12: at San Diego Chargers ====
Week 12: New York Jets at San Diego Chargers

Quarter	1	2	3	4	Total
Jets (8–3)	10	17	3	7	37
Chargers (8–3)	0	7	0	8	15

at San Diego Stadium, San Diego, California

- Date: November 24, 1968
- Game time: 4:00 p.m. EST
- Game weather: 60 °F (16 °C), relative humidity 87%, wind 6 mph (9.7 km/h)
- Game attendance: 51,175
- TV announcers (NBC): Curt Gowdy (play-by-play), Kyle Rote (color commentator)
- Box Score

Scoring summary

Quarter	Time	Drive			Team	Scoring information	Score	
Quarter	Time	Plays	Yards	TOP	Team	Scoring information	Jets	Chargers
1					Jets	13-yard field goal by Turner	3	0
1					Jets	Maynard 87-yard touchdown reception from Namath, Turner kick good	10	0
2					Jets	Snell 3-yard touchdown run, Turner kick good	17	0
2					Jets	20-yard field goal by Turner	20	0
2		—	—	—	Chargers	Duncan 95-yard punt return for a touchdown, Partee kick good	20	7
2					Jets	Mathis 19-yard touchdown reception from Namath, Turner kick good	27	7
3					Jets	30-yard field goal by Turner	30	7
4					Jets	Mathis 1-yard touchdown run, Turner kick good	37	7
4					Chargers	MacKinnon 3-yard touchdown reception from Hadl, 2-point pass good, Hadl to MacKinnon	37	15
"TOP" = time of possession. For other American football terms, see Glossary of American football.							37	15

==== Week 13: vs. Miami Dolphins ====
Week 13: Miami Dolphins at New York Jets

Quarter	1	2	3	4	Total
Dolphins (4–7–1)	0	10	0	7	17
Jets (9–3)	0	14	0	21	35

at Shea Stadium, Flushing, New York

- Date: December 1, 1968
- Game time: 1:30 p.m. EST
- Game weather: 36 °F (2 °C), relative humidity 57%, wind 8 mph (13 km/h), wind chill 30 °F (−1 °C)
- Game attendance: 61,766
- Referee: Bob Finley
- TV announcers (NBC): Curt Gowdy (play-by-play), Kyle Rote (color commentator)
- Box Score

Scoring summary

Quarter	Time	Drive			Team	Scoring information	Score	
Quarter	Time	Plays	Yards	TOP	Team	Scoring information	Dolphins	Jets
2	13:24	12	72		Dolphins	15-yard field goal by Keyes	3	0
2	5:26	5	77		Jets	Maynard 54-yard touchdown reception from Namath, Turner kick good	3	7
2	3:08	2	9		Jets	Lammons 5-yard touchdown reception from Namath, Turner kick good	3	14
2	0:26	10	80		Dolphins	Milton 38-yard touchdown reception from Griese, Keyes kick good	10	14
4	11:04	17	86		Dolphins	Kiick 1-yard touchdown run, Keyes kick good	17	14
4	8:44	7	74		Jets	Maynard 47-yard touchdown reception from Parilli, Turner kick good	17	21
4	8:02	3	75		Jets	Maynard 25-yard touchdown reception from Parilli, Turner kick good	17	28
4	2:54	6	59		Jets	Turner 40-yard touchdown reception from Parilli, Turner kick good	17	35
"TOP" = time of possession. For other American football terms, see Glossary of American football.							17	35

==== Week 14: vs. Cincinnati Bengals ====
Week 14: Cincinnati Bengals at New York Jets

Quarter	1	2	3	4	Total
Bengals (3–11)	0	7	0	7	14
Jets (10–3)	14	3	3	7	27

at Shea Stadium, Flushing, New York

- Date: December 8, 1968
- Game time: 1:30 p.m. EST
- Game weather: 33 °F (1 °C), relative humidity 50%, wind 17 mph (27 km/h), wind chill 22 °F (−6 °C)
- Game attendance: 61,111
- TV announcers (NBC): Charlie Jones (play-by-play), Al DeRogatis (color commentator)
- Box Score

Scoring summary

Quarter	Time	Drive			Team	Scoring information	Score	
Quarter	Time	Plays	Yards	TOP	Team	Scoring information	Bengals	Jets
1					Jets	Sauer 10-yard touchdown reception from Namath, Turner kick good	0	7
1					Jets	Maynard 12-yard touchdown reception from Namath, Turner kick good	0	14
2					Bengals	Robinson 14-yard touchdown run, Sherman kick good	7	14
2					Jets	35-yard field goal by Turner	7	17
3					Jets	22-yard field goal by Turner	7	20
4		—	—	—	Bengals	Fumble returned 0 yards for a touchdown by Griffin, Sherman kick good	14	20
4					Jets	Turner 34-yard touchdown reception from Parilli, Turner kick good	14	27
"TOP" = time of possession. For other American football terms, see Glossary of American football.							14	27

==== Week 15: at Miami Dolphins ====
Week 15: New York Jets at Miami Dolphins

Quarter	1	2	3	4	Total
Jets (11–3)	10	7	7	7	31
Dolphins (5–8–1)	0	7	0	0	7

at Miami Orange Bowl, Miami, Florida

- Date: December 15, 1968
- Game time: 1:30 p.m. EST
- Game weather: 57 °F (14 °C), relative humidity 56%, wind 17 mph (27 km/h)
- Game attendance: 32,843
- TV announcers (NBC): Curt Gowdy (play-by-play), Kyle Rote (color commentator)
- Box Score

Scoring summary

Quarter	Time	Drive			Team	Scoring information	Score	
Quarter	Time	Plays	Yards	TOP	Team	Scoring information	Jets	Dolphins
1	6:37	3	80		Jets	Snell 6-yard touchdown run, Turner kick good	7	0
1	0:48	6	33		Jets	49-yard field goal by Turner	10	0
2	8:57	5	14		Jets	Boozer 1-yard touchdown run, Turner kick good	17	0
2	1:20	5	9		Dolphins	Csonka 1-yard touchdown run, Moreau kick good	17	7
3	9:07	9	82		Jets	Lammons 3-yard touchdown reception from Parilli, Turner kick good	24	7
4	2:47	10	58		Jets	Mathis 2-yard touchdown run, Turner kick good	31	7
"TOP" = time of possession. For other American football terms, see Glossary of American football.							31	7

== Postseason ==
- On December 29, Weeb Ewbank became the first coach to win titles in the National Football League and in the American Football League. His former team, the Baltimore Colts won the 1968 NFL Championship on December 29 as well. The Colts defeated the Cleveland Browns by a score of 34–0.

Week	Date	Opponent	Result	Record	Venue	Attendance	Recap
AFL Championship	December 29, 1968	Oakland Raiders	W 27–23	1–0	Shea Stadium	62,627	Recap
Super Bowl III	January 12, 1969	Baltimore Colts	W 16–7	2–0	Orange Bowl	75,402	Recap

=== AFL Championship ===
In the franchise's first-ever postseason game, the Jets defeated the defending AFL champion Oakland Raiders 27-23 at Shea Stadium to claim the AFL title and advance to Super Bowl III. Joe Namath threw three touchdown passes, including the game-winner to Don Maynard midway through the fourth quarter.

The 1968 AFL Championship Game is the only league or conference championship game the Jets have ever hosted, the only one they have won, and their only postseason win at Shea Stadium.

1968 AFL Championship Game: Oakland Raiders at New York Jets – Game summary

Quarter	1	2	3	4	Total
Raiders (13–3)	0	10	3	10	23
Jets (12–3)	10	3	7	7	27

at Shea Stadium • Flushing, New York

- Date: December 29, 1968
- Game time: 1:00 p.m. EST
- Game weather: 42 °F (6 °C), relative humidity 51%, wind 18 mph (29 km/h)
- Game attendance: 62,627
- Referee: Walt Fitzgerald
- TV announcers (NBC): Curt Gowdy (play-by-play), Kyle Rote (color commentator)

Team	Category	Player	Statistics
OAK	Passing		
OAK	Rushing		
OAK	Receiving		
NYJ	Passing		
NYJ	Rushing		
NYJ	Receiving		

Scoring summary

Quarter	Time	Drive			Team	Scoring information	Score	
Quarter	Time	Plays	Yards	TOP	Team	Scoring information	Raiders	Jets
1					Jets	Maynard 14-yard touchdown reception from Namath, Turner kick good	0	7
1					Jets	33-yard field goal by Turner	0	10
2					Raiders	Biletnikoff 29-yard touchdown reception from Lamonica, Blanda kick good	7	10
2					Jets	36-yard field goal by Turner	7	13
2					Raiders	26-yard field goal by Blanda	10	13
3					Raiders	9-yard field goal by Blanda	13	13
3					Jets	Lammons 20-yard touchdown reception from Namath, Turner kick good	13	20
4					Raiders	20-yard field goal by Blanda	16	20
4					Raiders	Banaszak 4-yard touchdown run, Blanda kick good	23	20
4					Jets	Maynard 6-yard touchdown reception from Namath, Turner kick good	23	27
"TOP" = time of possession. For other American football terms, see Glossary of American football.							23	27

=== Super Bowl III ===
==== The Guarantee ====
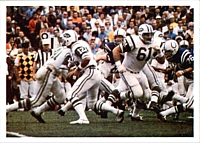
Namath (middle) running a play against the Colts in Super Bowl III.

In January 1969, the Jets would reach the pinnacle of their existence and provide the moment that would indicate the AFL's coming of age. Under Namath's guidance, the Jets rose to the top of the AFL, defeating the Oakland Raiders in a thrilling AFL championship game, 27–23. The win qualified them to represent their league in a game that was being referred to for the first time as the Super Bowl (and referred to retroactively as Super Bowl III). They were pitted against the champions of the NFL, the Baltimore Colts. At the time, the AFL was considered to be inferior to the NFL, and most considered the Jets to be considerable underdogs and treated them as such. That would change three nights before the game while Namath was being honored by the Miami Touchdown Club as its Player of the Year. Namath took exception to a heckling Colts fan and used that moment to lament the lack of respect his team had gotten to that point. He then said "The Jets will win Sunday. I guarantee it." His audacious remark proved correct, as the Jets created one of the greatest upsets in football history by defeating the Colts 16–7. This victory showed that the AFL was capable of competing with the NFL.

==== Scoring summary ====
Super Bowl III: New York Jets vs. Baltimore Colts – Game summary

Quarter	1	2	3	4	Total
Jets (13–3)	0	7	6	3	16
Colts (15–2)	0	0	0	7	7

at Miami Orange Bowl • Miami, Florida

- Date: January 12, 1969
- Game time: 3:05 p.m. EST
- Game weather: 73 °F (23 °C), overcast, windy, 20% chance of rain, wind 12 mph (19 km/h)
- Game attendance: 75,389
- Referee: Tom Bell
- TV announcers (NBC): Curt Gowdy (play-by-play), Al DeRogatis and Kyle Rote (color commentators), Jim Simpson (sideline reporter)

Team	Category	Player	Statistics
NYJ	Passing	Joe Namath	17/28, 206 YDS
NYJ	Rushing	Matt Snell	30 CAR, 121 YDS, 1 TD
NYJ	Receiving	George Sauer	8 REC, 133 YDS
BAL	Passing	Johnny Unitas	11/24, 110 YDS, 1 INT
BAL	Rushing	Tom Matte	11 CAR, 116 YDS
BAL	Receiving	Willie Richardson	6 REC, 58 YDS

Scoring summary

Quarter	Time	Drive			Team	Scoring information	Score	
Quarter	Time	Plays	Yards	TOP	Team	Scoring information	Jets	Colts
2	9:03	12	80	5:06	Jets	Snell 4-yard touchdown run, Turner kick good	7	0
3	10:08	8	8	4:17	Jets	32-yard field goal by Turner	10	0
3	3:58	10	45	4:06	Jets	30-yard field goal by Turner	13	0
4	13:26	7	61	3:58	Jets	9-yard field goal by Turner	16	0
4	3:19	14	80	3:15	Colts	Hill 1-yard touchdown run, Michaels kick good	16	7
"TOP" = time of possession. For other American football terms, see Glossary of American football.							16	7

- Point spread: Jets +18
- Over/under: 40.0 (under)
- Time of game:

Jets	Game statistics	Colts
21	First downs	18
43–142	Rushes–yards	23–143
206	Passing yards	181
17–29–0	Passes	17–41–4
2–11	Sacked–yards	0–0
195	Net passing yards	181
337	Total yards	324
34	Return yards	139
4–38.8	Punts	3–44.3
1–1	Fumbles–lost	1–1
5–28	Penalties–yards	3–23
36:10	Time of possession	23:50

Individual stats

- Passing: Namath – 17/28, 206 YDS; Parilli – 0/1, 0 YDS
- Rushing: Snell – 30 CAR, 121 YDS, 1 TD; Boozer – 10 CAR, 19 YDS; Mathis – 3 CAR, 2 YDS
- Receiving: Sauer – 8 REC, 133 YDS; Snell – 4 REC, 40 YDS; Mathis – 3 REC, 20 YDS; Lammons – 2 REC, 13 YDS
- Kickoff returns: Christy – 1 KR, 25 YDS
- Punt returns: Baird – 1 PR, 0 YDS
- Punting: Johnson – 4 PUNTS, 155 YDS
- Kicking: Turner – 1/1 PAT, 3/5 FG
- Interceptions: Beverly – 2 INT, 0 YDS; Hudson – 1 INT, 9 YDS; Sample – 1 INT, 0 YDS
- Jets Missed Field Goals: Turner 41, 42

== Media ==
Radio
Flagship Station	Play-by-play	Color Commentator	Studio Host
WABC–AM 770	Merle Harmon	Sam DeLuca	

Pre season Local TV
Flagship Station	Play-by-play	Color Commentator
WOR-TV 9		

== Stats ==
Passing

Passing
Player	G	GS	QBrec	Cmp	Att	Cmp%	Yds	TD	TD%	Int	Int%	Lng	Y/A	AY/A	Y/C	Y/G	Rate
Joe Namath	14	14	11–3–0	187	380	49.2	3147	15	3.9	17	4.5	87	8.3	7.1	16.8	224.8	72.1
Babe Parilli	14	0		29	55	52.7	401	5	9.1	2	3.6	40	7.3	7.5	13.8	28.6	91.6
Matt Snell	14	14		1	1	100.0	26	0	0.0	0	0.0	26	26.0	26.0	26.0	1.9	118.7
NYJ Totals	14		11–3–0	217	436	49.8	3574	20	4.6	19	4.4	87	8.2	7.2	16.5	255.3	74.8
Opp Totals	14			187	403	46.4	2567	17	4.2	28	6.9		6.4	4.09	13.7	183.4	77.9

Rushing

Rushing
Player	G	GS	Att	Yds	TD	Lng	Y/A	Y/G	A/G
Matt Snell	14	14	179	743	6	60	4.2	53.4	12.8
Emerson Boozer	12	12	143	441	5	33	3.1	36.8	11.9
Bill Mathis	14	2	74	208	5	16	2.8	14.9	5.3
Billy Joe	10	0	42	186	3	32	4.4	18.6	4.2
George Sauer	14	14	2	21	0	15	10.5	1.5	0.1
Mark Smolinski	14	0	12	15	0	5	1.3	1.1	0.9
Joe Namath	14	14	5	11	2	4	2.2	0.8	0.4
Babe Parilli	14	0	7	−2	1	10	−0.3	−0.1	0.5
Curley Johnson	14	1	2	−6	0	0	−3.0	−0.4	0.1
Bill Rademacher	14	0	1	−13	0	−13	−13.0	−0.9	0.1
NYJ Totals	14		467	1608	22	60	3.4	114.9	33.4
Opp Totals	14		368	1195	9		3.2	85.4	26.3

Receiving

Receiving
Player	G	GS	Rec	Yds	Y/R	TD	Lng	R/G	Y/G
George Sauer	14	14	66	1141	17.3	3	43	4.7	81.5
Don Maynard	13	13	57	1297	22.8	10	87	4.4	99.8
Pete Lammons	13	13	32	400	12.5	3	27	2.5	30.8
Matt Snell	14	14	16	105	6.6	1	39	1.1	7.5
Emerson Boozer	12	12	12	101	8.4	0	23	1.0	8.4
Bake Turner	13	1	10	241	24.1	2	71	0.8	18.5
Bill Mathis	14	2	9	149	16.6	1	31	0.6	10.6
Mark Smolinski	14	0	6	40	6.7	0	19	0.4	2.9
Curley Johnson	14	1	5	78	15.6	0	18	0.4	5.6
Billy Joe	10	0	2	11	5.5	0	11	0.2	1.1
Bill Rademacher	14	0	2	11	5.5	0	6	0.1	0.8
NYJ Totals	14		217	3574	16.5	20	87	15.5	255.3
Opp Totals	14		187	2168	11.6	17		13.4	154.9

Kicking

Kicking
Player	G	GS	0–19	20–29	30–39	40–49	50+	FGM	FGA	FG%	XPM	XPA	XP%
Jim Turner	14	0	8–8	15–18	6–10	5–9	0–1	34	46	73.9%	43	43	100.0%
NYJ Totals	14		8–8	15–18	6–10	5–9	0–1	34	46	73.9%	43	43	100.0%
Opp Totals	14							9	17	73.9%	33	34	97.1%

Punting

Punting
Player	G	GS	Pnt	Yds	Lng	Blck	Y/P
Curley Johnson	14	1	68	2977	65	1	43.8
NYJ Totals	14		68	2977	65	1	43.8
Opp Totals	14		98	3763			38.4

Kick Return

Kick Return
Player	G	GS	Rt	Yds	TD	Lng	Y/RT
Earl Christy	14	0	25	599	0	87	24.0
Bake Turner	13	1	14	319	0	36	22.8
Matt Snell	14	14	3	28	0	15	9.3
Mike D'Amato	13	0	1	32	0	32	32.0
Mark Smolinski	14	0	1	17	0	17	17.0
John Neidert	5	0	1	0	0	0	0.0
Bill Rademacher	14	0	1	0	0	0	0.0
NYJ Totals	14		46	995	0	87	21.6
Opp Totals	14		82	1664	0		20.3

Punt Return

Punt Return
Player	G	GS	Ret	Yds	TD	Lng	Y/R
Earl Christy	14	0	13	116	0	39	8.9
Bill Baird	14	14	18	111	0	20	6.2
Jim Richards	12	0	4	57	0	37	14.3
Gerry Philbin	14	14	1	2	0	2	2.0
NYJ Totals	14		36	286	0	39	7.9
Opp Totals	14		39	531	3		13.6

Defense & Fumbles

Defensive Interceptions
Player	G	GS	Int	Yds	TD	Lng	PD
Johnny Sample	14	14	7	88	1	39	0
Jim Hudson	14	14	5	96	0	45	0
Randy Beverly	13	13	4	127	1	68	0
Bill Baird	14	14	4	74	0	36	0
Ralph Baker	14	14	3	31	0	20	0
Al Atkinson	14	14	2	24	0	22	0
Cornell Gordon	14	4	2	0	0	0	0
Earl Christy	14	0	1	16	0	16	0
NYJ Totals	14		28	456	2	68	0
Opp Totals	14						

Fumbles
Player	G	GS	FF	Fmb	FR	Yds	TD
Emerson Boozer	12	12	0	5	4	0	0
Johnny Sample	14	14	0	0	1	5	0
Ralph Baker	14	14	0	0	1	0	0
Babe Parilli	14	0	0	3	1	0	0
Earl Christy	14	0	0	2	0	0	0
Cornell Gordon	14	4	0	0	1	0	0
Matt Snell	14	14	0	2	1	0	0
Curley Johnson	14	1	0	1	1	0	0
Carl McAdams	14	0	0	0	2	6	0
Gerry Philbin	14	14	0	0	2	0	0
Bill Rademacher	14	0	0	0	2	0	0
Paul Rochester	14	14	0	0	2	0	0
Bob Talamini	14	14	0	0	2	0	0
Paul Crane	13	0	0	1	0	−38	0
Mike D'Amato	13	0	0	0	1	0	0
Winston Hill	14	14	0	0	1	0	0
Billy Joe	10	0	0	1	0	0	0
Bill Mathis	14	2	0	1	0	0	0
Joe Namath	14	14	0	1	0	0	0
Jim Richards	12	0	0	1	0	0	0
George Sauer	14	14	0	1	0	0	0
John Schmitt	14	14	0	0	1	0	0
Mark Smolinski	14	0	0	0	1	0	0
Bake Turner	13	1	0	0	1	0	0
NYJ Totals	14		0	19	25	−27	0
Opp Totals	14			29	14		

Sacks & Tackles
Player	G	GS	Sk	Tkl	Ast	Sfty
Paul Crane	13	0				1
NYJ Totals	14					1
Opp Totals	14		18			

Scoring Summary

Scoring Summary
Player	G	GS	RshTD	RecTD	PR TD	KR TD	FblTD	IntTD	OthTD	AllTD	2PM	2PA	XPM	XPA	FGM	FGA	Sfty	Pts
Jim Turner	14	0											43	43	34	46		145
Don Maynard	13	13		10						10								60
Matt Snell	14	14	6	1						7								42
Bill Mathis	14	2	5	1						6	1							38
Emerson Boozer	12	12	5							5								30
Billy Joe	10	0	3							3								18
Pete Lammons	13	13		3						3								18
George Sauer	14	14		3						3								18
Joe Namath	14	14	2							2								12
Bake Turner	13	1		2						2								12
Randy Beverly	13	13						1		1								6
Babe Parilli	14	0	1							1								6
Johnny Sample	14	14						1		1								6
Mark Smolinski	14	0							1	1								6
Paul Crane	13	0															1	2
NYJ Totals	14		22	20				2	1	45	1		43	43	34	46	1	421
Opp Totals	14		9	17	3		3	4					33	34	9	17		280

Team

Team Stats
Player	PF	Yds	Ply	Y/P	TO	FL	1stD	Pass Cmp	Pass Att	Pass Yds	Pass TD	Int	NY/A	Pass 1stD	Rush Att	Rush Yds	Rush TD	Y/A	Rush 1stD	Pen	Yds	1stPy
NYJ Stats	419	5047	921	5.5	28	9	249	217	436	3439	20	19	7.6	144	467	1608	22	3.4	80	76	742	25
Opp Stats	280	3363	814	4.1	43	15	178	187	403	2168	17	28	4.9	104	368	1195	9	3.2	59	65	695	15
Lg Rank Offense	2	3			3	2	3		3	3	4	4	2		3	8	1	9				
Lg Rank Defense	4	1			2	3	1		4	2	4	2	3		2	1	2	1				

Quarter-by-quarter

Quarter-by-quarter
	1	2	3	4	T
Jets	103	113	64	139	419
Opponents	44	69	41	126	280

- PI AFL-AFC Player of the Year
- Joe Namath, Super Bowl Most Valuable Player

Preceded by Oakland Raiders; 1967	American Football League champion 1968	Succeeded by Kansas City Chiefs; 1969
