= 1967 New York Jets season =

1967 season of AFL team New York Jets

- Owner: Sonny Werblin
- Head coach: Weeb Ewbank
- Home stadium: Shea Stadium

Results
- Record: 8–5–1
- Division place: 2nd AFL East
- Playoffs: Did not qualify

The 1967 New York Jets season was the eighth season for the team in the American Football League (AFL). The season began with the team trying to improve on their 6–6–2 record from 1966 under head coach Weeb Ewbank. The Jets finished with an 8–5–1 record (their first winning season). Third year quarterback Joe Namath had the best season of his career becoming the first quarterback in pro football history to throw for 4,000 yards in a season (he threw for 4,007 yards). It remains a club record as of 2024. In addition, Namath also posted career highs in touchdown passes (26), but he also posted a career high in interceptions thrown with 28. He was second only to Jim Hart of the NFL's St. Louis Cardinals in that statistic.

== Roster ==
1967 New York Jets roster
Quarterbacks (QB): 12 Joe Namath; 17 Mike Taliaferro; Running backs (RB): 45 Earl Christy; 28 Abner Haynes; 35 Billy Joe; 31 Bill Mathis; 30 Mark Smolinski; 41 Matt Snell; Wide receivers (WR): 13 Don Maynard; 83 George Sauer; 29 Bake Turner; Tight ends (TE): 87 Pete Lammons	Offensive linemen (OL): 67 Dave Herman G; 75 Winston Hill T; 57 John Matlock C; 79 Sherman Plunkett T; 66 Randy Rasmussen G; 74 Jeff Richardson G; 52 John Schmitt C; Defensive linemen (DL): 86 Verlon Biggs DE; 80 John Elliott DT; 78 Jim Harris DT; 81 Gerry Philbin DE; 72 Paul Rochester DT; 82 Bert Wilder DE/DT	Linebackers (LB): 62 Al Atkinson MLB; 51 Ralph Baker OLB; 56 Paul Crane OLB; 60 Larry Grantham OLB; 50 Carl McAdams OLB; 54 Jim Waskiewicz MLB; Defensive backs (DB): 46 Bill Baird FS; 42 Randy Beverly CB; 47 Solomon Brannan CB; 48 Cornell Gordon CB; 40 Henry King SS; 23 Bill Rademacher FS; 24 Johnny Sample; Special teams (ST): 33 Curley Johnson P; 11 Jim Turner K	Practice squad: Gene Bledsoe G; Tommy Burnett WR; Steve Chomyszak DT; King Corcoran QB; John Dockery CB; Ray Scott P; Bill Starr TE; Mike Stromberg LB; Reserve: 32 Emerson Boozer RB (IR); 65 Sam DeLuca G (IR); 22 Jim Hudson S (IR); 64 Pete Perreault G/T (IR); 73 Dennis Randall DT (IR); 71 Paul Seiler T (IR); 88 Bill Yearby LB (IR); Rookies in italics

== Schedule ==
Week	Date	Opponent	Result	Record	Venue	Attendance	Recap
1	Bye						
2	September 10	at **Buffalo Bills**	**L** 17–20	0–1	War Memorial Stadium	45,748	Recap
3	Bye						
4	September 24	at Denver Broncos	**W** 38–24	1–1	Bears Stadium	35,565	Recap
5	October 1	**Miami Dolphins**	**W** 29–7	2–1	Shea Stadium	61,240	Recap
6	October 7	Oakland Raiders	**W** 27–14	3–1	Shea Stadium	63,106	Recap
7	October 15	**Houston Oilers**	**T** 28–28	3–1–1	Shea Stadium	62,729	Recap
8	October 22	at **Miami Dolphins**	**W** 33–14	4–1–1	Orange Bowl	30,049	Recap
9	October 29	**Boston Patriots**	**W** 30–23	5–1–1	Shea Stadium	62,784	Recap
10	November 5	at Kansas City Chiefs	**L** 18–42	5–2–1	Municipal Stadium	46,642	Recap
11	November 12	**Buffalo Bills**	**W** 20–10	6–2–1	Shea Stadium	62,671	Recap
12	November 19	at **Boston Patriots**	**W** 29–24	7–2–1	Fenway Park	26,790	Recap
13	Bye						
14	December 3	Denver Broncos	**L** 24–33	7–3–1	Shea Stadium	61,615	Recap
15	December 10	Kansas City Chiefs	**L** 7–21	7–4–1	Shea Stadium	62,891	Recap
16	December 17	at Oakland Raiders	**L** 29–38	7–5–1	Oakland–Alameda County Coliseum	53,011	Recap
17	December 24	at San Diego Chargers	**W** 42–31	8–5–1	San Diego Stadium	34,580	Recap
Note: Intra-division opponents are in **bold** text.

== Game summaries ==
=== Week 16 ===
Team	1	2	3	4	Total
• Jets	14	14	14	0	42
Chargers	7	17	0	7	31

- Date: December 24
- Location: San Diego Stadium

== Standings ==
AFL Eastern Division
	W	L	T	PCT	DIV	PF	PA	STK
Houston Oilers	9	4	1	.692	5–1–1	258	199	W2
New York Jets	8	5	1	.615	5–1–1	371	329	W1
Buffalo Bills	4	10	0	.286	3–5	237	285	L1
Miami Dolphins	4	10	0	.286	2–6	219	407	L1
Boston Patriots	3	10	1	.231	3–5	280	389	L5

Note: Tie games were not officially counted in the standings in the AFL.
