= 1969 New York Jets season =

1969 season of AFL team New York Jets

- Owner: Leon Hess
- Head coach: Weeb Ewbank
- Home stadium: Shea Stadium

Results
- Record: 10–4
- Division place: 1st AFL East
- Playoffs: Lost Divisional Playoffs (vs. Chiefs) 6–13

The 1969 New York Jets season was the tenth season for the team, and their final season in the American Football League (AFL). Attempting to defend their AFL championship and Super Bowl III title they failed to improve on their 11–3 record from 1968. However, the Jets won the AFL Eastern Division again with a 10–4 record, their last winning season until 1981. In the divisional playoffs, they fell to the eventual AFL and Super Bowl IV champion, the Kansas City Chiefs 13–6. It would be their last playoff appearance for twelve years and last division title until 1998.

== Roster ==
1969 New York Jets roster
Quarterbacks (QB): 12 Joe Namath; 15 Babe Parilli; 18 Al Woodall; Running backs (RB): 32 Emerson Boozer; 31 Bill Mathis; 30 George Nock; 41 Matt Snell; 34 Lee White; Wide receivers (WR): 83 George Sauer; 29 Bake Turner; Tight ends (TE): 87 Pete Lammons; 89 Wayne Stewart	Offensive linemen (OL): 61 Roger Finnie T; 67 Dave Herman G; 75 Winston Hill T; 64 Pete Perreault G; 66 Randy Rasmussen G; 52 John Schmitt C; 79 Paul Seiler C; Defensive linemen (DL): 86 Verlon Biggs DE; 80 John Elliott DT; 65 Jimmie Jones DE; 50 Carl McAdams DT/DE; 81 Gerry Philbin DE; 72 Paul Rochester DT; 85 Steve Thompson DT/DE	Linebackers (LB): 62 Al Atkinson MLB; 51 Ralph Baker OLB; 55 Jim Carroll OLB; 56 Paul Crane OLB; 60 Larry Grantham OLB; 63 John Neidert MLB; Defensive backs (DB): 46 Bill Baird FS; 40 Mike Battle FS; 42 Randy Beverly CB; 43 John Dockery CB; 48 Cornell Gordon CB; 26 Jim Richards SS; Special teams (ST): 20 Steve O'Neal P; 11 Jim Turner K	Practice squad: 73 Ray Hayes DT; 28 Cecil Leonard CB; 13 Don Maynard WR; 17 Harry Theofiledes QB; 68 Gordon Wright G; Reserve: 70 Dave Foley T (IR); 22 Jim Hudson S (IR); 35 Billy Joe RB (IR); -- Michael Stromberg LB (IR); 71 Sam Walton T (Susp.); Rookies in italics

== Regular season ==
=== Season schedule ===
Week	Date	Opponent	Result	Record	Venue	Attendance	Recap
1	September 14	at **Buffalo Bills**	**W** 33–19	1–0	War Memorial Stadium	46,165	Recap
2	September 21	at Denver Broncos	**L** 19–21	1–1	Mile High Stadium	50,583	Recap
3	September 28	at San Diego Chargers	**L** 27–34	1–2	San Diego Stadium	54,042	Recap
4	October 5	at **Boston Patriots**	**W** 23–14	2–2	Alumni Stadium	25,584	Recap
5	October 12	at Cincinnati Bengals	**W** 21–7	3–2	Nippert Stadium	27,927	Recap
6	October 20	**Houston Oilers**	**W** 26–17	4–2	Shea Stadium	63,841	Recap
7	October 26	**Boston Patriots**	**W** 23–17	5–2	Shea Stadium	62,298	Recap
8	November 2	**Miami Dolphins**	**W** 34–31	6–2	Shea Stadium	61,761	Recap
9	November 9	**Buffalo Bills**	**W** 16–6	7–2	Shea Stadium	62,680	Recap
10	November 16	Kansas City Chiefs	**L** 16–34	7–3	Shea Stadium	63,849	Recap
11	November 23	Cincinnati Bengals	**W** 40–7	8–3	Shea Stadium	62,128	Recap
12	November 30	Oakland Raiders	**L** 14–27	8–4	Shea Stadium	63,865	Recap
13	December 6	at **Houston Oilers**	**W** 34–26	9–4	Astrodome	51,923	Recap
14	December 14	at **Miami Dolphins**	**W** 27–9	10–4	Miami Orange Bowl	48,108	Recap
Note: Intra-division opponents are in **bold** text.

=== Game summaries ===
==== Week 1 ====
Team	1	2	3	4	Total
• Jets	6	10	3	14	33
Bills	3	0	6	10	19

- Date: September 14
- Location: War Memorial Stadium, Buffalo, New York
- Game weather: 70 °F (21 °C), wind 11 mph

Scoring summary
1	NYJ	Jim Turner 9 yard field goal	Jets 3–0
1	BUF	Bruce Alford 35 yard field goal	Tie 3–3
1	NYJ	Jim Turner 26 yard field goal	Jets 6–3
2	NYJ	Jim Turner 41 yard field goal	Jets 9–3
2	NYJ	Don Maynard 60 yard pass from Joe Namath (Jim Turner kick)	Jets 16–3
3	NYJ	Jim Turner 21 yard field goal	Jets 19–3
3	BUF	Bill Enyart 5 yard pass from Jack Kemp (pass failed)	Jets 19–9
4	BUF	O.J. Simpson 8 yard run (Bruce Alford kick)	Jets 19–16
4	BUF	Bruce Alford 10 yard field goal	Tie 19–19
4	NYJ	Matt Snell 11 yard run (Jim Turner kick)	Jets 26–19
4	NYJ	Paul Crane 23 yard interception return (Jim Turner kick)	Jets 33–19

=== Postseason ===
Round	Date	Opponent	Result	Venue	Attendance	Recap
Divisional	December 20	**Kansas City Chiefs**	**L** 6–13	Shea Stadium	62,977	Recap

== Standings ==
AFL Eastern Division
	W	L	T	PCT	DIV	PF	PA	STK
New York Jets	10	4	0	.714	8–0	353	269	W2
Houston Oilers	6	6	2	.500	5–3	278	279	W1
Boston Patriots	4	10	0	.286	3–5	266	316	L2
Buffalo Bills	4	10	0	.286	2–6	230	359	L2
Miami Dolphins	3	10	1	.231	2–6	233	332	L1

Note: Tie games were not officially counted in the standings of the AFL.

== Awards and honors ==
- Joe Namath, Co-AFL MVP
- Joe Namath, UPI AFL-AFC Player of the Year
