= 1966 New York Jets season =

1966 season of AFL team New York Jets

- Owner: Sonny Werblin
- Head coach: Weeb Ewbank
- Home stadium: Shea Stadium

Results
- Record: 6–6–2
- Division place: 3rd AFL East
- Playoffs: Did not qualify

The 1966 New York Jets season was the seventh season for the team in the American Football League (AFL). The season began with the team trying to improve on their 5–8–1 record from 1965 under head coach Weeb Ewbank. The Jets finished the season 6–6–2.

== Roster ==
1966 New York Jets NYJ roster
Quarterbacks (QB): 12 Joe Namath; 17 Mike Taliaferro; Running backs (RB): 30 Mark Smolinski; 31 Bill Mathis; 32 Emerson Boozer; 41 Matt Snell; Wide receivers (WR): 13 Don Maynard; 29 Bake Turner; 83 George Sauer; 84 Sammy Weir; Tight ends (TE): 87 Pete Lammons	Offensive linemen (OL): 52 John Schmitt C; 61 Dan Ficca G; 64 Pete Perreault G/T; 65 Sam DeLuca G; 67 Dave Herman G; 73 Mitch Dudek T; 75 Winston Hill T; 79 Sherman Plunkett T; Defensive linemen (DL): 77 Steve Chomyszak DT; 78 Jim Harris DT; 80 Bob Werl DE; 82 Bert Wilder DT/DE; 81 Gerry Philbin DE; 86 Verlon Biggs DE; 88 Bill Yearby DE	Linebackers (LB): 51 Ralph Baker OLB; 54 Jim Waskiewicz MLB; 56 Paul Crane OLB; 60 Larry Grantham OLB; 62 Al Atkinson MLB; 63 Jim O'Mahoney OLB; Defensive backs (DB): 22 Jim Hudson FS; 25 Ray Abruzzese SS; 40 Dainard Paulson SS/FS; 45 Earl Christy CB; 46 Bill Baird CB; 48 Cornell Gordon CB; Special teams (ST): 11 Jim Turner K; 33 Curley Johnson P	Practice squad: 42 Randy Beverly CB; 28 Jim Gray CB; 26 Pat Gucciardo CB; 76 Ken Hollister T; -- Mike Katz G; 57 John Matlock C; 23 Bill Rademacher WR; 20 Bob Schweickert QB; 37 Allen Smith RB; 85 Bill Starr TE; Reserve: 7 Sherman Lewis CB/S (IR); 89 Dee Mackey TE (NF-Ill.); 50 Carl McAdams LB (IR); 72 Paul Rochester DT (IR); 24 Johnny Sample CB (IR); 74 Henry Schmidt DT (IR); -- Arnie Simkus DT (IR); Rookies in italics

== Schedule ==
Week	Date	Opponent	Result	Record	Venue	Attendance	Recap
1	Bye						
2	September 9	at **Miami Dolphins**	**W** 19–14	1–0	Miami Orange Bowl	34,402	Recap
3	September 18	**Houston Oilers**	**W** 52–13	2–0	Shea Stadium	54,681	Recap
4	September 25	at Denver Broncos	**W** 16–7	3–0	Bears Stadium	29,878	Recap
5	October 2	at **Boston Patriots**	**T** 24–24	3–0–1	Fenway Park	27,255	Recap
6	October 8	San Diego Chargers	**W** 17–16	4–0–1	Shea Stadium	63,497	Recap
7	October 16	at **Houston Oilers**	**L** 0–24	4–1–1	Rice Stadium	30,823	Recap
8	October 23	Oakland Raiders	**L** 21–24	4–2–1	Shea Stadium	58,135	Recap
9	October 30	**Buffalo Bills**	**L** 23–33	4–3–1	Shea Stadium	61,552	Recap
10	Bye						
11	November 13	at **Buffalo Bills**	**L** 3–14	4–4–1	War Memorial Stadium	45,738	Recap
12	November 20	**Miami Dolphins**	**W** 30–13	5–4–1	Shea Stadium	58,664	Recap
13	November 27	Kansas City Chiefs	**L** 24–32	5–5–1	Shea Stadium	60,318	Recap
14	December 3	at Oakland Raiders	**T** 28–28	5–5–2	Oakland–Alameda County Coliseum	32,144	Recap
15	December 11	at San Diego Chargers	**L** 27–42	5–6–2	Balboa Stadium	25,712	Recap
16	December 17	**Boston Patriots**	**W** 38–28	6–6–2	Shea Stadium	58,921	Recap
Note: Intra-division opponents are in **bold** text.

== Standings ==
AFL Eastern Division
	W	L	T	PCT	DIV	PF	PA	STK
Buffalo Bills	9	4	1	.692	6–2	358	255	W1
Boston Patriots	8	4	2	.667	5–1–1	315	283	L1
New York Jets	6	6	2	.500	4–3–1	322	312	W1
Houston Oilers	3	11	0	.214	1–7	335	396	L8
Miami Dolphins	3	11	0	.214	2–5	213	362	W1

Note: Tie games were not officially counted in the standings in the AFL.
