= 1965 New York Jets season =

1965 season of AFL team New York Jets

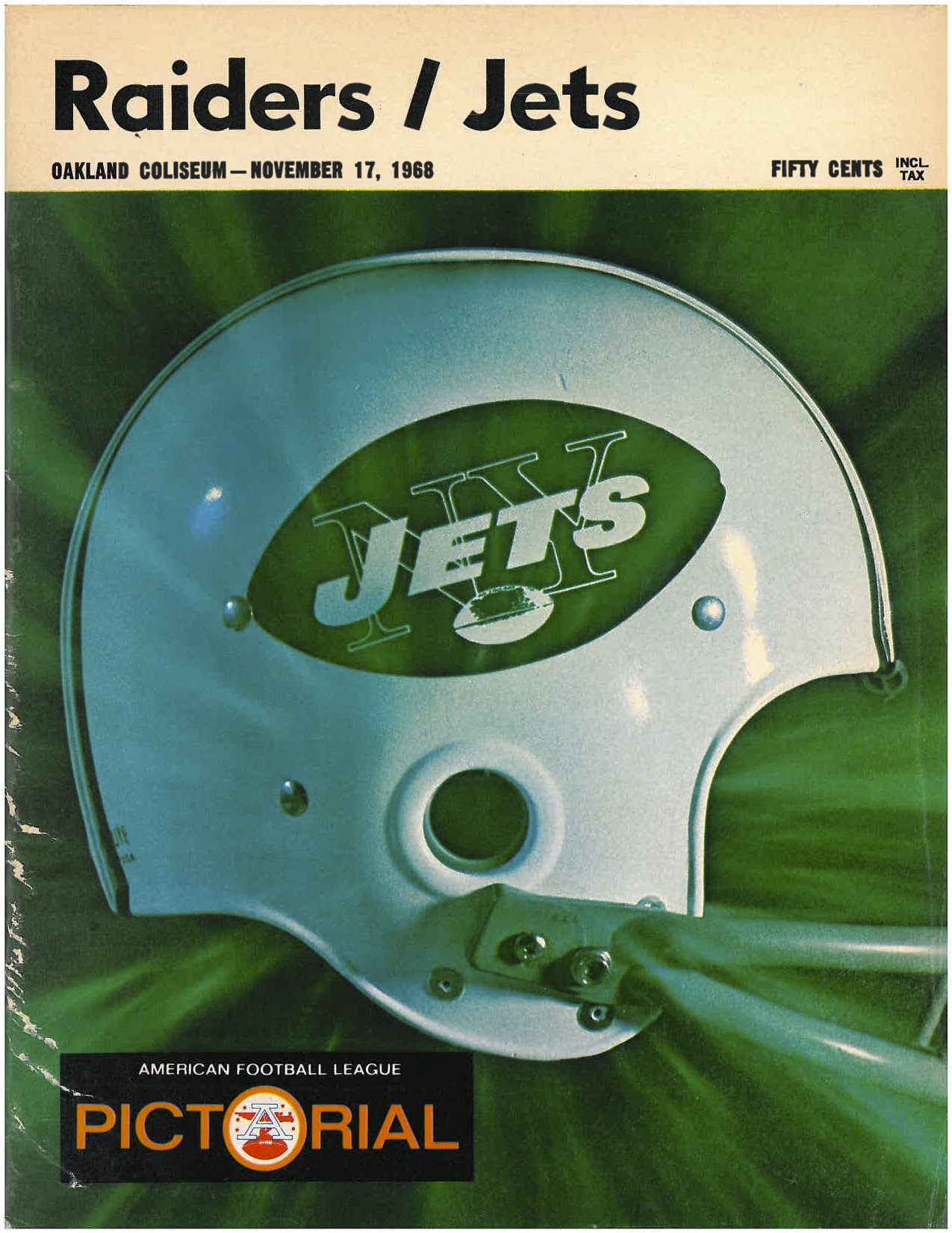
- Owner: Sonny Werblin
- Head coach: Weeb Ewbank
- Home stadium: Shea Stadium

Results
- Record: 5–8–1
- Division place: 2nd AFL East
- Playoffs: Did not qualify

The 1965 New York Jets season was the sixth season for the team in the American Football League (AFL). The season began with the team trying to improve on their 5–8–1 record from 1964 under head coach Weeb Ewbank. The Jets finished the season 5–8–1, their third consecutive season with that record. The Jets drafted Joe Namath, who made his first appearance in the second game of the year against Kansas City, relieving Mike Taliaferro. Namath would start the last six games of the season, where he won three of them.

The Jets changed their primary logo in 1965, reversing the colors and slightly enlarging the helmet decal, which was now solid green with white lettering ("JETS" in thick sans-serif italics in front of "NY" in outline serif lettering) and a white miniature football at bottom center.

== Offseason ==
=== Draft ===
1965 New York Jets draft
Round	Pick	Player	Position	College	Notes
1	1	Joe Namath * ^{†}	QB	Alabama	
Made roster † Pro Football Hall of Fame * Made at least one Pro Bowl during career

== Roster ==
1965 New York Jets roster
Quarterbacks (QB): 12 Joe Namath; 17 Mike Taliaferro; Running backs (RB): 30 Mark Smolinski; 31 Bill Mathis; 41 Matt Snell; 45 Kern Carson; Wide receivers (WR): 13 Don Maynard; 20 Bob Schweickert; 29 Bake Turner; 80 Jim Evans; Tight ends (TE): 83 George Sauer; 89 Dee Mackey	Offensive linemen (OL): 52 Mike Hudock C; 56 John Schmitt C; 61 Dan Ficca G; 65 Sam DeLuca G; 67 Dave Herman G; 71 Nick DeFelice T; 75 Winston Hill T; 79 Sherman Plunkett T; Defensive linemen (DL): 72 Paul Rochester DT; 78 Jim Harris DT; 81 Gerry Philbin DE; 82 Bert Wilder DT/DE; 86 Verlon Biggs DE; 87 LaVerne Torczon DE	Linebackers (LB): 51 Ralph Baker OLB; 54 Wahoo McDaniel MLB; 60 Larry Grantham OLB; 63 Jim O'Mahoney OLB; 88 Al Atkinson MLB; Defensive backs (DB): 22 Willie West CB; 25 Ray Abruzzese FS; 40 Dainard Paulson SS; 42 Clyde Washington CB; 46 Bill Baird FS; 48 Cornell Gordon CB; Special teams (ST): 11 Jim Turner K; 33 Curley Johnson P	Practice squad: 32 Charlie Browning RB; -- Seth Cartwright DT; -- Mitch Dudek; -- Jim Gray CB; -- John Huarte QB; 45 Cosmo Iacavazzi RB; 64 Pete Perreault G/T; -- Gary Plumlee DE; 23 Bill Rademacher WR; Reserve: 85 Gene Heeter TE (IR); 44 Jim Hudson S (IR); Rookies in italics

== Regular season ==
=== Schedule ===
Week	Date	Opponent	Result	Record	Venue	Attendance	Recap
1	September 12	at **Houston Oilers**	**L** 21–27	0–1	Rice Stadium	52,680	Recap
2	September 18	Kansas City Chiefs	**L** 10–14	0–2	Shea Stadium	53,658	Recap
3	September 26	at **Buffalo Bills**	**L** 21–33	0–3	War Memorial Stadium	45,056	Recap
4	October 3	at Denver Broncos	**L** 13–16	0–4	Bears Stadium	34,988	Recap
5	Bye						
6	October 16	Oakland Raiders	**T** 24–24	0–4–1	Shea Stadium	59,890	Recap
7	October 23	San Diego Chargers	**L** 9–34	0–5–1	Shea Stadium	60,679	Recap
8	October 31	Denver Broncos	**W** 45–10	1–5–1	Shea Stadium	55,572	Recap
9	November 7	at Kansas City Chiefs	**W** 13–10	2–5–1	Municipal Stadium	25,523	Recap
10	November 14	at **Boston Patriots**	**W** 30–20	3–5–1	Fenway Park	18,589	Recap
11	November 21	**Houston Oilers**	**W** 41–14	4–5–1	Shea Stadium	55,312	Recap
12	November 28	**Boston Patriots**	**L** 23–27	4–6–1	Shea Stadium	59,334	Recap
13	December 4	at San Diego Chargers	**L** 7–38	4–7–1	Balboa Stadium	32,167	Recap
14	December 12	at Oakland Raiders	**L** 14–24	4–8–1	Frank Youell Field	19,013	Recap
15	December 19	**Buffalo Bills**	**W** 14–12	5–8–1	Shea Stadium	57,396	Recap
Note: Intra-division opponents are in **bold** text.

== Standings ==
Program for the October 16 game against the Oakland Raiders.

AFL Eastern Division
	W	L	T	PCT	DIV	PF	PA	STK
Buffalo Bills	10	3	1	.769	4–2	313	226	L1
New York Jets	5	8	1	.385	3–3	285	303	W1
Boston Patriots	4	8	2	.333	2–4	244	302	W3
Houston Oilers	4	10	0	.286	3–3	298	429	L7

Note: Tie games were not officially counted in the standings in the AFL.

== Awards and honors ==
- Joe Namath, Offensive MVP, AFL All-Star Game, UPI Rookie of the Year
