= Matt Snell =

American football player (1941–2026)

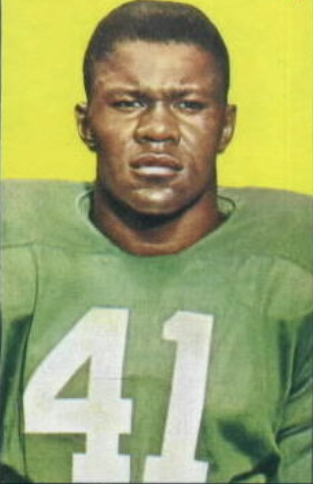
- Topps card of Snell, 1965

No. 41
- Position: Fullback

Personal information
- Born: August 18, 1941; Garfield, Georgia, U.S.
- Died: March 10, 2026 (aged 84); Long Island, New York, U.S.
- Listed height: 6 ft 2 in (1.88 m)
- Listed weight: 219 lb (99 kg)

Career information
- High school: Carle Place (North Hempstead, New York)
- College: Ohio State (1960–1963)
- NFL draft: 1964: 4th round, 49th overall pick
- AFL draft: 1964: 1st round, 3rd overall pick

Career history

Playing
- New York Jets (1964–1972)

Coaching
- Bridgeport Jets (1973) Assistant coach

Awards and highlights
- Super Bowl champion (III); AFL champion (1968); AFL Rookie of the Year (1964); First-team All-AFL (1969); 3× Second-team All-AFL (1964, 1965, 1968); 3× AFL All-Star (1964, 1966, 1969); New York Jets Ring of Honor; National champion (1961); Second-team All-Big Ten (1962)

Career NFL/AFL statistics
- Rushing yards: 4,287
- Rushing average: 4.1
- Receptions: 193
- Receiving yards: 1,375
- Total touchdowns: 31
- Stats at Pro Football Reference

Matthews Snell (August 18, 1941 – March 10, 2026) was an American professional football player who was a fullback for the New York Jets of the American Football League (AFL) and National Football League (NFL). He played college football for the Ohio State Buckeyes. Snell was Jets' owner Sonny Werblin's first coup, prior to his 1965 acquisition of Joe Namath. Snell's 1964 signing jolted the crosstown New York Giants, who didn't draft Snell until the fourth round, and offered him a fraction of what the Jets gave him as their first-round choice. After joining the Jets, he would play in Super Bowl III, where he notably, among other things, scored the Jets' only touchdown and had good rushing stats in their upset 16-7 win over the Baltimore Colts.

== Early life ==
Born to Isaac and Annie, Snell attended Carle Place High School in the one-square-mile town of Carle Place, New York, where his picture resides in the Carle Place High School Athletic Hall of Fame. Snell played right halfback on a team that lost only two games while he started. He was awarded Newsday's Thorp Award for 1959 as the outstanding high school football player in Nassau County.

At Ohio State University, Snell was a three-year starter and a consummate team player, active on both sides of the ball. In 1961, he played right halfback, often blocking for fullback Bob Ferguson or left halfback Paul Warfield. In 1962, Snell was moved to defensive end. In 1963, Snell's senior year, he was named starting fullback, going on to rush for 491 yards and five touchdowns. At the end of his senior season, Snell was named his team's most valuable player.

Snell was named to the Ohio State Football All-Century Team in 2000 as a defensive end.

== Football career ==
In his rookie year with the New York Jets, Snell rushed for a team-record 180 yards against the Houston Oilers on his way to a 945-yard season and AFL Rookie of the Year honors. Snell went on to become an AFL Eastern Division All-Star in 1964 and 1966, and the Sporting News All-AFL fullback in 1969.

Snell's defining moment came in Super Bowl III when the AFL champion Jets played the heavily favored NFL champion Baltimore Colts. Although slowed by knee injuries, Snell was a key player in the Jets' ball-control offense during the 16–7 upset victory. He carried the ball 30 times for a then-Super Bowl record of 121 yards, and in the second quarter went four yards around left end to score the Jets' only touchdown, a score that marked the first time an AFL team had led in a Super Bowl. He also helped set up a trio of Jim Turner field goals that finally put the game away for the Jets in the second half, securing the AFL's first Super Bowl win in the league's penultimate season.

During his career, Snell was well known for his rushing, but also became an important part of the Jets' pass-blocking scheme. Toward the end of his career, Snell became one of the first third-down specialty backs, primarily because he was so good at protecting Joe Namath. He was also reported to have helped teach pass-blocking to Jets running backs during his career.

Snell suffered multiple injuries in his career, including torn knee cartilage in 1967 and a torn Achilles tendon in 1970. In 1971, he hurt his knee in the preseason and was diagnosed with a severe "knee bruise" and missed nine games. In 1972, in Week 4 versus the Miami Dolphins, he suffered a ruptured spleen. The injury was so severe that his spleen had to be removed, ending his season. He decided right then that he couldn't play anymore, though he didn't formally announce his retirement until the following March. He later said "I just figured I was 32 years old and tired of rehabbing. I just decided to hang it up." He only played in a total of 12 games in what would be his final three seasons.

== Post-football ==
In 1973, Snell appeared in the first Miller Lite beer commercial. According to the San Francisco Chronicle, "The campaign would feature a collection of middle-aged sports stars and become something of a status symbol for retired athletes for the next 17 years."

After his playing career in 1973, he sold his restaurant, Matt Snell's Fifth Down, to focus on his new company, Defco Securities, Inc. (of which he was one of the four partners).

Snell and Emerson Boozer were inducted into the Jets' Ring of Honor on November 29, 2015, because they were partners in each other's success and that of the team. Snell did not accept the Jets' invitation to participate in the ceremony at MetLife Stadium, just as he had consistently refused the club's invitations to other alumni events for unspecified reasons ever since he retired. In 2018, Snell revealed that the reason he hadn't spoken to the Jets was because the team's owner at the time he left, Leon Hess, refused to give him a reference for a future job in spite of both being promised he would receive one, and in spite of his work to build the team's success over his professional football career.

== Personal life and death ==
Snell lived in New Rochelle, New York, with his wife, Sharon, and their son and daughter. His grandson played football for Holy Cross High School. He was a partner in DEFCO Securities, Inc. and owned a restaurant in New York City. He was the first cousin, twice removed of running back Benny Snell, with Benny Snell's grandfather being his first cousin.

Snell died on Long Island, New York, on March 10, 2026, at the age of 84.

== NFL career statistics ==
Legend
	Won the Super Bowl
**Bold**	Career high

Year	Team	Games		Rushing						Receiving					Fumbles	
Year	Team	GP	GS	Att	Yds	Avg	Y/G	Lng	TD	Rec	Yds	Avg	Lng	TD	Fum	FR
1964	NYJ	**14**	**14**	**215**	**948**	4.4	67.7	42	5	**56**	**393**	7.0	41	1	0	0
1965	NYJ	13	13	169	763	**4.5**	58.7	44	4	38	264	6.9	35	0	3	0
1966	NYJ	12	12	178	644	3.6	53.7	25	4	48	346	7.2	25	**4**	3	0
1967	NYJ	7	5	61	207	3.4	29.6	13	0	11	54	4.9	21	0	2	0
1968	NYJ	**14**	**14**	179	747	4.2	53.4	60	**6**	16	105	6.6	39	1	2	**1**
1969	NYJ	**14**	13	191	695	3.6	49.6	34	4	22	187	8.5	54	1	**5**	**1**
1970	NYJ	3	3	64	281	4.4	**93.7**	19	1	2	26	**13.0**	27	0	2	0
1971	NYJ	5	0	did not record any stats												
1972	NYJ	4	0	did not record any stats												
Career		86	74	1,057	4,285	4.1	49.8	60	24	193	1,375	7.1	54	7	17	2

== See also ==
- List of American Football League players

== Book sources ==
- Curran, Bob (1965). The $400,000 Quarterback, or: The League That Came in From the Cold. New York, New York: Macmillan & Company, Inc. ISBN 0-8118-2276-1.
- Gruver, Ed (1997). The American Football League: A Year-By-Year History, 1960-1969. Jefferson, North Carolina: McFarland & Company, Inc. ISBN 0-7864-0399-3.
