= Pete Lammons =

American football player (1943–2021)

No. 87, 86
- Position: Tight end

Personal information
- Born: October 20, 1943; Crockett, Texas, U.S.
- Died: April 29, 2021 (aged 77); Sam Rayburn Reservoir, Texas, U.S.
- Listed height: 6 ft 3 in (1.91 m)
- Listed weight: 230 lb (104 kg)

Career information
- High school: Jacksonville (Jacksonville, Texas)
- College: Texas
- NFL draft: 1966: 14th round, 213th overall pick
- AFL draft: 1966: 8th round, 68th overall pick

Career history
- New York Jets (1966-1971); Green Bay Packers (1972)

Awards and highlights
- Super Bowl champion (III); AFL champion (1968); AFL All-Star (1967); National champion (1963); First-team All-SWC (1965)

Career NFL/AFL statistics
- Receptions: 185
- Receiving yards: 2,364
- Receiving touchdowns: 14
- Stats at Pro Football Reference

Peter Spencer Lammons Jr. (October 20, 1943 – April 29, 2021) was an American professional football player who was a tight end for the American Football League (AFL)'s New York Jets and the NFL's Green Bay Packers. He won the AFL Championship with the Jets in 1968, and played in their victory over the National Football League (NFL) champion Baltimore Colts in the third AFL-NFL World Championship game (aka Super Bowl III). He also won a National Championship with the 1963 Texas Longhorns football team

== Early life ==
As a high school freshman, Lammons played briefly under NFL coach Bum Phillips during his tenure as head coach at Jacksonville High School in Jacksonville, Texas. They met again briefly in January 1968 on the sidelines of the 1967 AFL All Star Game. Lammons, playing in his first and only All Star Game, greeted Phillips, who was an assistant with the San Diego Chargers organization, after the game with a question: "Bum, does this mean I can claim you as a coach?" Phillips allegedly responded "You can claim me as your'n if I can claim you as mine, Pete!"

== College career ==
Lammons played end for Darrell Royal's Texas Longhorns from 1963 to 1965. In 1963 the team went undefeated and won the conference, the Cotton Bowl and the National Championship. In 1964 they finished the season by upsetting No. 1 Alabama in the Orange Bowl. He left Texas as the career leader in receptions and receiving yards – records that would not be broken until 1981 – and still hold the record for most TD receptions in a game (3, tied with Pat Fitzgerald and D.J. Grant). He led the school in receptions in both 1964 and 1965 and was a consensus All-Conference receiver in 1965.

== Professional career ==
Lammons was drafted in the 8th round (68th overall) of the 1966 AFL draft by the New York Jets and in the 14th round (213th overall) of the 1966 NFL draft by the Cleveland Browns. He selected to play for the Jets. During his rookie year he played well enough to come in 4th for the Offensive Rookie of the Year and was the top TE/WR in the voting. The next year he went to the All-Star Game, the AFL's equivalent of the Pro Bowl and helped the Jets win Super Bowl III catching 2 passes for 13 yards in the game. He played four more seasons with the Jets and then one with Green Bay – though he saw such limited playing time with Green Bay that he only caught one pass – before retiring.

After retiring, Lammons got into real estate and partnered with former teammate Jim Hudson in the thoroughbred racing business.

== NFL/AFL career statistics ==
Legend
	Won the Super Bowl
**Bold**	Career high

=== Regular season ===
Year	Team	Games		Receiving				
Year	Team	GP	GS	Rec	Yds	Avg	Lng	TD
1966	NYJ	14	14	41	**565**	13.8	60	**4**
1967	NYJ	14	14	**45**	515	11.4	**61**	2
1968	NYJ	13	13	32	400	12.5	27	3
1969	NYJ	14	14	33	400	12.1	25	2
1970	NYJ	14	14	25	316	12.6	30	2
1971	NYJ	14	14	8	149	18.6	27	1
1972	GNB	12	0	1	19	**19.0**	19	0
		95	83	185	2,364	12.8	61	14

=== Playoffs ===
Year	Team	Games		Receiving				
Year	Team	GP	GS	Rec	Yds	Avg	Lng	TD
1968	NYJ	2	2	**6**	**65**	10.8	**20**	**1**
1969	NYJ	1	1	3	37	**12.3**	14	0
1972	GNB	1	0	0	0	0.0	0	0
		4	3	9	102	11.3	20	1

== Death ==
Lammons died on April 29, 2021, when he fell from a boat during a Major League Fishing tournament on the Sam Rayburn Reservoir in Texas. He was 77 years old.

== See also ==
- List of American Football League players
