= Bake Turner =

American football player (born 1940)

No. 30, 29, 40
- Position: Wide receiver

Personal information
- Born: July 22, 1940 (age 86); Alpine, Texas, U.S.
- Listed height: 6 ft 1 in (1.85 m)
- Listed weight: 179 lb (81 kg)

Career information
- High school: Alpine
- College: Texas Tech (1958-1961)
- NFL draft: 1962: 12th round, 163rd overall pick

Career history
- Baltimore Colts (1962); New York Jets (1963-1969); Boston Patriots (1970)

Awards and highlights
- Super Bowl champion (III); AFL champion (1968); AFL All-Star (1963)

Career AFL/NFL statistics
- Receptions: 220
- Receiving yards: 3,541
- Receiving touchdowns: 25
- Total return yards: 1,844
- Stats at Pro Football Reference

Robert Hardy "Bake" Turner (born July 22, 1940) is an American former professional football player who was a wide receiver in the National Football League (NFL) and American Football League (AFL), who later became a country musician. He played college football at Texas Technological College (now Texas Tech University), then professionally for nine seasons. He was with the AFL's New York Jets, where in 1963 he replaced Art Powell who had been traded to the Oakland Raiders. He was a member of the Jets' AFL and Super Bowl III teams after the 1968 season, and also played for the Baltimore Colts and Boston Patriots of the NFL.

== College career ==
Turner played as a running back while playing for Texas Tech.

=== Freshman season ===
In 1959, Turner had 25 attempts for 86 yards and one touchdown. Receiving wise, Turner had 22 receptions for 444 yards, which averaged 20.2 yards per reception, the best in the NCAA. He also caught 3 touchdowns.

=== Sophomore season ===
Turner improved his rushing yard total to 36 attempts for 150 yards and one touchdown. However, he decreased his receiving yards, with only 9 receptions for 173 receiving yards.

=== Junior season ===
Turner, yet again, increased his total rushing yards for the season, with 41 attempts for 185 yards and one touchdown. He only had 3 receptions for 30 yards.

=== Statistics ===
			Receiving				Rushing			
Year	Team	G	Rec	Yds	Avg	TD	Att	Yds	Avg	TD
1959	Texas Tech	10	22	444	20.2	3	25	86	3.4	1
1960	Texas Tech	10	9	173	19.2	0	36	150	4.2	1
1961	Texas Tech	10	3	30	10.0	0	41	185	4.5	1
Career		30	34	647	19.0	3	102	421	4.1	3

== Professional football career ==
Turner forwent his senior season and entered the 1962 NFL draft, where he was drafted by the Baltimore Colts in the 12th round (163rd overall).

=== Baltimore Colts ===
With the Colts, Turner was primarily used as a return specialist, with 504 kick return yards on 20 attempts and 95 punt return yards on 10 attempts. Turner rushed for 17 yards on 1 attempt. Turner received for 111 yards on one attempt, and one touchdown. However, those 111 yards came from two plays. In a game against the Bears, Lamar McHan completed a pass to R. C. Owens at the 40-yard line. Owens then lateralled the ball to Turner, who ran all the way to the 3-yard line. Owens was credited with the catch, and Turner had 0 receptions for 37 yards. In the final game of the season, Turner had a touchdown reception for 74 yards. Turner finished the season with an average of 111 yards per reception, technically an NFL record.

=== New York Jets ===
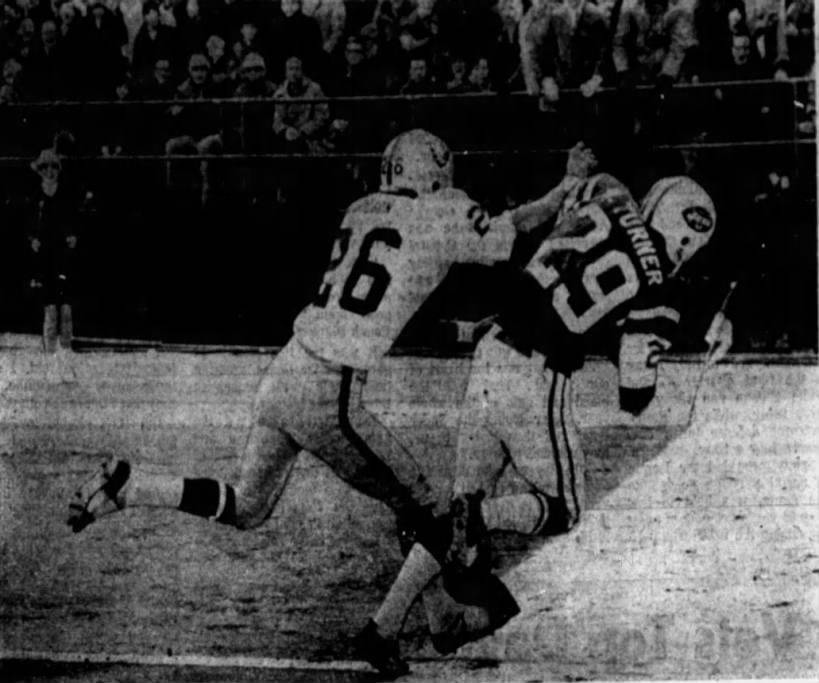
Nemiah Wilson of the Oakland Raiders tackling Bake Turner in 1969.

Turner spent most of his career with the New York Jets. In 1963, his first year with the team, Turner was selected to the AFL All-Star Game after catching 71 receptions for 1,009 yards, with 6 touchdowns. Turner received 14 kick returns for 299 yards, as well. Along with being an All-Star, Turner was selected as the team MVP. In 1964, Turner caught 58 passes for 974 yards and 9 touchdowns. In 1965, Turner caught 31 passes for 402 yards and 2 touchdowns and returned 18 kicks for 402 yards. In 1966, Turner caught 7 passes for 115 yards, returned 10 punts for 60 yards, and returned 2 kicks for 50 yards. In 1967, Turner caught only 3 passes for 40 yards and returned 4 kicks for 40 yards. In the Jets' Super Bowl-winning season in 1968, Turner caught 10 passes for 241 yards and 2 touchdowns and returned 14 kicks for 319 yards. In Turner's final season as a Jet in 1969, Turner caught 11 passes for 221 yards and 3 touchdowns and returned 3 kicks for 74 yards.

=== Boston Patriots ===
After the 1969 season, Turner was traded to the Boston Patriots, where he spent one season. That season was a fairly successful one, with 28 receptions for 428 yards and 2 touchdowns.

=== Jets (second stint) and retirement ===
Turner rejoined the Jets the ensuing offseason, but chose to retire when it became clear he would otherwise have been cut prior to Week 1. "Oh, I've had bout enough football anyway," he told George Vecsey of The New York Times at the time. "This will just give me more time for my singing. Besides, if somebody gets hurt, I told Weeb (Ewbank, the Jets coach) I'd be the first one to offer to help.”

== NFL/AFL career statistics ==
Legend
	Won the Super Bowl
**Bold**	Career high

=== Regular season ===
Year	Team	Games		Receiving				
Year	Team	GP	GS	Rec	Yds	Avg	Lng	TD
1962	BAL	14	0	1	111	**111.0**	**74**	1
1963	NYJ	14	14	**71**	**1,009**	14.2	53	6
1964	NYJ	14	14	58	974	16.8	71	**9**
1965	NYJ	13	6	31	402	13.0	62	2
1966	NYJ	14	0	7	115	16.4	42	0
1967	NYJ	8	0	3	40	13.3	22	0
1968	NYJ	13	1	10	241	24.1	71	2
1969	NYJ	14	3	11	221	20.1	54	3
1970	BOS	14	13	28	428	15.3	43	2
		118	51	220	3,541	16.1	74	25

=== Playoffs ===
Year	Team	Games		Receiving				
Year	Team	GP	GS	Rec	Yds	Avg	Lng	TD
1968	NYJ	2	0	0	0	0.0	0	0
1969	NYJ	1	1	2	25	12.5	17	0
		3	1	2	25	12.5	17	0

== Music career ==
Even before retiring from the NFL, Turner began pursuing a career as a country musician, recording a demo called "Violation" in 1966 and releasing at least two singles through Kapp Records in 1969, Who Put The Leaving In Your Eyes / Hold Me Tight and Is Anybody Going to San Antone.

As of 2019, at 79 years old, he was still performing — with his Super Bowl ring on his finger.

== See also ==
- Other American Football League players
