= Bruce Alford =

Bruce Alford may refer to:

- Bruce Alford Jr. (born 1945), American football kicker
- Bruce Alford Sr. (1922–2010), American football end

== See also ==
- Bryce Alford (born 1995), American basketball player
