= Karl Henke (American football) =

American football player (1945–2025)

No. 70, 80
- Positions: Defensive end, Defensive tackle

Personal information
- Born: March 8, 1945; Ventura, California, U.S.
- Died: August 25, 2025 (aged 80); Oxnard, California, U.S.
- Listed height: 6 ft 4 in (1.93 m)
- Listed weight: 245 lb (111 kg)

Career information
- High school: Ventura
- College: Tulsa (1966-1967)
- NFL draft: 1968: 8th round, 214th overall pick

Career history
- New York Jets (1968); Boston Patriots (1969); San Diego Chargers (1971)*
- * Offseason or practice squad member only

Awards and highlights
- Super Bowl champion (III); AFL champion (1968)

Career AFL statistics
- Sacks: 2
- Stats at Pro Football Reference

Karl Henke (March 8, 1945 – August 21, 2025) was an American professional football defensive end and defensive tackle. He played for the New York Jets in 1968 and Boston Patriots in 1969.

== Biography ==
Henke was born and raised in Ventura, California, where he starred in football and track, first for Ventura High School and then Ventura College. He transferred to the University of Tulsa, where he continued to be a standout football player and track athlete. In 1990, Henke was inducted into the Ventura County Sports Hall of Fame.

Henke died on August 25, 2025, at the age of 80.
