= Jim Turner (placekicker) =

American football player (1941–2023)

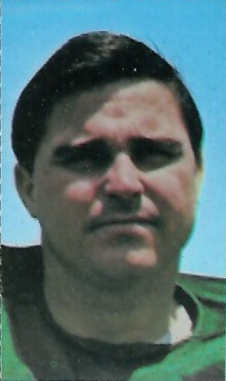
- Turner in 1969

No. 11, 15
- Position: Placekicker

Personal information
- Born: March 28, 1941; Martinez, California, U.S.
- Died: June 10, 2023 (aged 82); Arvada, Colorado, U.S.
- Listed height: 6 ft 2 in (1.88 m)
- Listed weight: 205 lb (93 kg)

Career information
- High school: John Swett (Crockett, California)
- College: Utah State
- NFL draft: 1963: 19th round, 259th overall pick

Career history
- New York Jets (1964–1970); Denver Broncos (1971–1979)

Awards and highlights
- Super Bowl champion (III); AFL champion (1968); 2× Pro Bowl (1968, 1969); 2× AFL scoring leader (1968, 1969); AFL All-Time Second-team; Denver Broncos Ring of Fame

Career AFL/NFL statistics
- Field goals attempted: 488
- Field goals made: 304
- Field goal percentage: 62.3%
- Longest field goal: 53
- Extra points attempted: 543
- Extra points made: 521
- Extra point percentage: 95.9%
- Points scored: 1,439
- Stats at Pro Football Reference

James Bayard Turner (March 28, 1941 – June 10, 2023) was an American professional football placekicker who played in the American Football League (AFL) and National Football League (NFL) for the New York Jets and Denver Broncos. He was a two-time Pro Bowl selection with the Jets and a member of their Super Bowl III championship team. Turner was chosen for the AFL All-Time Second-team and the Denver Broncos Ring of Fame.

== Career ==
Turner was born and raised in Martinez, California. He graduated from John Swett High School in 1959. He played for the football team as a quarterback and was also a freestyle swimmer. Turner attended Utah State University, where he played college football for the Utah State Aggies as both a quarterback and placekicker.

The Washington Redskins of the National Football League (NFL) selected Turner 259th overall in the 19th round of the 1963 NFL draft. He signed with the Redskins, but failed a tryout with the Redskins and was released. Turner signed with the New York Jets of the American Football League (AFL) as a free agent in 1964. He set then-league records with single-season totals of 145 points and 34 field goals in 1968. He tie Gino Cappelletti's AFL record with six field goals (on eight attempts) on November 3, 1968 against the Buffalo Bills. It was matched in 1972 but not broken until Jason Myers broke the record with seven field goals in 2018. Turner kicked for nine points, making two of three field goals, in the AFL Championship Game win over the Oakland Raiders. He had 10 points in the Jets' 16–7 defeat of the Baltimore Colts in Super Bowl III. He was named to the Pro Bowl in 1968 and 1969.

Following the 1970 season, the Jets traded Turner to the Denver Broncos for Bobby Howfield. He scored four points in the Broncos' losing effort in Super Bowl XII against the Dallas Cowboys, connecting on a 47-yard field goal and an extra point following a touchdown run by Rob Lytle.

Turner finished his career with 304 of 488 (62%) field goals, 521 of 534 extra points and a touchdown on a 25 yard reception from a fake field goal, giving him 1,439 total points. Upon his retirement, he ranked second in field goals in NFL history, with only a fellow AFL veteran in George Blanda having more; Turner now ranks in the top 35 for kickers four decades after his career ended. He did not miss a game, playing in 228 consecutive contests. His single-season scoring record was broken by Mark Moseley in 1983, and Ali Haji-Sheikh broke Turner's field goal record the same season. He was inducted into the Denver Broncos Ring of Fame in 1988 and the Utah State University Athletics Hall of Fame in 2013.

== NFL career statistics ==
Legend
	Won the Super Bowl
	Led the league
**Bold**	Career high

=== Regular season ===
Year	Team	GP	Field goals				Extra points			Points
Year	Team	GP	FGA	FGM	Lng	Pct	XPA	XPM	Pct	Points
1964	NYJ	14	27	13	50	48.1	33	33	**100.0**	72
1965	NYJ	14	34	20	49	58.8	31	31	**100.0**	91
1966	NYJ	14	35	18	45	51.4	35	34	97.1	88
1967	NYJ	14	32	17	48	53.1	39	36	92.3	87
1968	NYJ	14	46	**34**	49	73.9	**43**	**43**	**100.0**	**145**
1969	NYJ	14	**47**	32	50	68.1	33	33	**100.0**	129
1970	NYJ	14	35	19	42	54.3	28	28	**100.0**	85
1971	DEN	14	38	25	49	65.8	18	18	**100.0**	93
1972	DEN	14	29	20	49	69.0	37	37	**100.0**	97
1973	DEN	14	33	22	50	66.7	40	40	**100.0**	106
1974	DEN	14	21	11	43	52.4	38	35	92.1	68
1975	DEN	14	28	21	**53**	**75.0**	26	23	88.5	86
1976	DEN	14	21	15	47	71.4	39	36	92.3	81
1977	DEN	14	19	13	48	68.4	34	31	91.2	70
1978	DEN	**16**	22	11	45	50.0	35	31	88.6	64
1979	DEN	**16**	21	13	49	61.9	34	32	94.1	71
Career		228	488	304	53	62.3	543	521	95.9	1,433

=== Postseason ===
Year	Team	GP	Field goals			Extra points			Points
Year	Team	GP	FGA	FGM	Pct	XPA	XPM	Pct	Points
1968	NYJ	2	**8**	**5**	62.5	4	4	**100.0**	**19**
1969	NYJ	1	2	2	**100.0**	–	–	–	6
1977	DEN	**3**	6	3	50.0	**7**	**7**	**100.0**	16
1978	DEN	1	2	1	50.0	1	1	**100.0**	4
1979	DEN	1	–	–	–	1	1	**100.0**	1
Career		8	18	11	61.1	13	13	100.0	46

== Broadcasting career ==
In 1981, Turner joined NBC Sports as a color commentary sportscaster.

== Personal life ==
Turner's widow, Mary Kay, is from El Sobrante, California. They had three daughters and lived in Arvada, Colorado.

Turner died in Arvada, Colorado from heart failure on June 10, 2023, at the age of 82.

== See also ==
- List of American Football League players
- List of most consecutive starts and games played by National Football League players
