= Michael Stromberg =

American football player (born 1945)

No. 68
- Position: Linebacker

Personal information
- Born: May 25, 1945 (age 81); Brooklyn, New York, U.S.
- Listed height: 6 ft 2 in (1.88 m)
- Listed weight: 235 lb (107 kg)

Career information
- High school: Samuel J. Tilden (Brooklyn)
- College: Temple (1963-1966)
- NFL draft: 1967: 14th round, 352nd overall pick

Career history
- Waterbury Orbits (1967); New York Jets (1967-1968)

Awards and highlights
- Super Bowl champion (III); NFL champion (1968)
- Stats at Pro Football Reference

Michael David Stromberg (born May 25, 1945) is an American former professional football linebacker in the National Football League (NFL) who played for the New York Jets. He played college football at Temple University. He is Jewish.
