= AFL on NBC =

TV program

- Logo of the AFL on NBC (2003-2006)
- Country of origin: United States
- Original language: English
- No. of seasons: 4

Production
- Camera setup: Multi-camera
- Running time: 180 minutes or until end of game
- Production company: NBC Sports

Original release
- Network: NBC
- Release: 2003 – 2006

The AFL on NBC is the branding used for broadcasts of Arena Football League (AFL) games produced by NBC Sports, the sports division of the NBC television network in the United States, that aired from the 2003 to 2006 seasons.

== Background ==
Jim Foster, a promotions manager with the National Football League (NFL), conceived the idea of indoor football while watching an indoor association football match at Madison Square Garden in 1981. While at the game, he wrote his idea on a 9x12 envelope from his briefcase with sketches of the field and notes on gameplay. He presented the idea to a few friends at the NFL offices, where he received praise and encouragement for his concept. After solidifying the rules and business plan, supplemented with sketches by a professional artist, Foster presented his idea to various television networks; he reached an agreement with NBC for a "test game".

In 1998, CBS assumed the broadcast rights to the American Football Conference (AFC) from NBC, ending the network's 38-year tenure with the NFL (a relationship it would forge again in 2006 when it acquired the rights to the Sunday Night Football package from ESPN). CBS had previously lost the television rights to the National Football Conference (NFC) to Fox in 1994, a situation that exacerbated CBS' struggles in the ratings. In 2000, NBC declined to renew its broadcast agreement with Major League Baseball. In 2002, it was additionally outbid by ESPN and ABC for the NBA's next broadcast deal, ending the league's twelve-year run on NBC.

During this era, NBC experimented with broadcasting emerging sports. In 2001, the network partnered with the World Wrestling Federation to establish the XFL – a new football league which introduced modified rules and debuted to tremendous, but short-lived fanfare, only lasting one season. In 2003, NBC obtained the broadcast rights (on a revenue sharing basis) and a minority interest in the Arena Football League. In conjunction with this, the league moved the beginning of the season from May to February (the week after the NFL's Super Bowl) and scheduled most of its games on Sunday afternoons instead of Friday or Saturday evenings as it had in the past. These moves were directly marketed to those seeking more football after the Super Bowl ended; advertisements for NBC's arena football coverage dubbed this phenomenon "post-Super Bowl stress disorder, or pissed" (thus openly using one of the seven dirty words). The network televised weekly games on a regional basis, as well as the entire playoff slate. The deal lasted four years, after which the league and NBC parted ways.

=== Music ===
Promotions for the network's AFL game telecasts featured famed former NFL player John Elway, accompanied by the song "Rumble" by Bon Jovi, the band fronted by Philadelphia Soul owner Jon Bon Jovi, with the lyrics "Come on feel the thunder. There's a rumble in the house!" The song was featured on the band's CD "There's A Rumble In The House!," which was published by NBC sister company Universal Music Group.

=== OLN's coverage ===
For the 2006 season, the AFL struck a cable agreement with OLN (now NBC Sports Network) to broadcast 11 weekly regular-season games and one Wild Card playoff game. However, the agreement was not renewed and was later picked up by ESPN, which also acquired a minority ownership stake in the league.

=== Ratings ===
The network's broadcast of ArenaBowl XX in 2006 earned NBC a considerably disappointing 0.7% of the U.S. households; the small audience for the 2006 ArenaBowl was the culmination of a season that earned NBC 0.9% of the U.S. households. This was down from the inaugural 2003 season of The AFL on NBC, which earned a 1.1% share; in contrast, even at its lowest, the XFL, which aired in 2001, was drawing 1.6% of U.S. households for its NBC broadcasts.

=== Criticism ===
NBC's coverage received sharp criticism from some longtime AFL fans and owners such as Jon Bon Jovi. The complaints were mostly because the network had severely cut back from their initial promotion of the AFL in 2003 and 2004, to barely promoting it at all in 2005 and 2006. NBC also tended to massively advertise select teams such as the Philadelphia Soul, Chicago Rush, Colorado Crush and the Dallas Desperados, while smaller-market teams such as the Austin Wranglers, San Jose SaberCats, Grand Rapids Rampage and the then-Buffalo Destroyers were massively underpromoted or not broadcast at all.

In 2006, due to the XX Winter Olympic Games, the Stanley Cup Playoffs, and the Daytona 500, NBC reduced its coverage of AFL games from weekly broadcast to scattered coverage during the regular season, albeit with an extensive playoff schedule ending with ArenaBowl XX. For that season, some games were moved to OLN, later known as NBC Sports Network (eleven regular-season games and one playoff game).

=== The end of The AFL on NBC ===
On June 30, 2006, the Arena Football League and NBC Sports failed to reach an agreement to extend their broadcasting contract, ending the network's association with the AFL after four years. League commissioner David Baker said regarding the end of the partnership, "NBC has been a great partner. We are forever grateful to them for exhibiting our game with the utmost respect and integrity. We wish them well, but are also excited to begin a new chapter that will continue our unprecedented growth." NBC Sports president Ken Schanzer responded, "Unfortunately we were unable to reach an agreement. We've enjoyed our partnership with the Arena Football League. It's a great game with great people. We wish them all the best." In an interview with The New York Times, NBC spokesman Mike McCarley stated, "we gave Arena Football our best effort, with top production and significant promotion, but the ratings never grew."

During an August 2006 segment of Larry King's interview with owner Jon Bon Jovi, a new deal was hinted at being in development, one that would be superior to its previous agreement with NBC. In December 2006, a deal was struck with ABC/ESPN to broadcast AFL regular season and playoff games. ESPN also assumed partial ownership of the league itself. Las Vegas Gladiators owner Jim Ferraro stated during a radio interview that the reason why a renewed deal with NBC failed was because ESPN refused to show highlights of the games or even mention a product being broadcast on NBC.

== Personalities ==
=== Studio commentary ===
The pre-game, halftime and post-game studio show was anchored by Al Trautwig and analyst Glenn Parker throughout its run. In 2003, Michael Irvin also provided studio analysis, but that role was subsequently filled with guest analysts, including Ray Bentley, Danny White, Tommy Maddox and Kurt Warner.

=== Game commentary ===
NBC’s primary AFL broadcast team was the same team which called Notre Dame football games for the network, with play-by-play Tom Hammond and analyst Pat Haden, with sideline reporter Lewis Johnson.

The secondary broadcast team consisted of Bob Papa on play-by-play with Ray Bentley as the analyst and Marty Snider as the sideline reporter. Usually a tertiary broadcast was included with NBC’s NASCAR lead broadcaster heading it; originally the role belonged to Allen Bestwick, but after Bill Weber replaced him on race casts he also took over for Bestwick in AFL coverage.

Other broadcasters included former TNN Arena Football and NASCAR broadcaster Eli Gold, color commentators Mike Pawlawski and Charles Davis, and sideline reporter Steve Wrigley.

== See also ==
- XFL
