= Jim Richards (American football) =

American football player (1946–2022)

No. 26
- Position: Defensive back

Personal information
- Born: October 28, 1946; Charlotte, North Carolina, U.S.
- Died: March 8, 2022 (aged 75)
- Listed height: 6 ft 1 in (1.85 m)
- Listed weight: 180 lb (82 kg)

Career information
- High school: Garinger (Charlotte)
- College: Virginia Tech
- NFL draft: 1968: 8th round, 210th overall pick

Career history
- New York Jets (1968-1969)

Awards and highlights
- Super Bowl champion (III); AFL champion (1968)

Career AFL statistics
- Interceptions: 3
- Stats at Pro Football Reference

James Buis Richards Jr. (October 28, 1946 – March 8, 2022) was an American professional football defensive back in the National Football League (NFL). After attending Virginia Tech, Richards played for the New York Jets in 1968 and 1969. He was a member of the Super Bowl III winning Jets team.

Richards died on March 8, 2022, at the age of 75.
