= Gerry Philbin =

American football player (1941–2025)

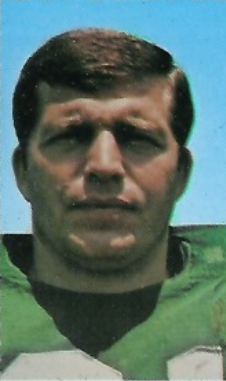
- Philbin in 1969

No. 81, 77
- Position: Defensive end

Personal information
- Born: July 31, 1941; Pawtucket, Rhode Island, U.S.
- Died: June 25, 2025 (aged 83); Palm Beach Gardens, Florida, U.S.
- Listed height: 6 ft 2 in (1.88 m)
- Listed weight: 245 lb (111 kg)

Career information
- High school: Tolman (Pawtucket)
- College: Buffalo
- NFL draft: 1964: 3rd round, 33rd overall pick
- AFL draft: 1964: 3rd round, 19th overall pick

Career history
- New York Jets (1964-1972); Philadelphia Eagles (1973); New York Stars (1974)

Awards and highlights
- Super Bowl champion (III); AFL champion (1968); 2× First-team All-AFL (1968, 1969); 2× AFL All-Star (1968, 1969); AFL sacks leader (1968); All-time All-AFL Team; New York Jets Ring of Honor; First-team All-WFL (1974); First-team All-East (1963)

Career NFL/AFL statistics
- Fumble recoveries: 7
- Interceptions: 1
- Sacks: 66.5
- Stats at Pro Football Reference

Gerald John Philbin (July 31, 1941 – June 25, 2025) was an American professional football player who played defensive end in the American Football League (AFL) and National Football League (NFL). He was a four-year starter playing college football for the Buffalo Bulls, earning several honors including second-team All-American, Little All-American, and All-American Academic team. Drafted by both the Detroit Lions of the NFL and the New York Jets of the AFL in the third round of their respective 1964 drafts, he joined the Jets and became an immediate starter and perennial All-AFL selection at defensive end. He played stellar defense for them for nine seasons.

Philbin was selected as an AFL All-Star in 1968 and 1969. A ferocious pass-rusher, Philbin recorded 14 1/2 sacks of opposing quarterbacks in 1968, helping the Jets win the AFL championship. In Super Bowl III, Philbin anchored the Jets defense in limiting the Colts to seven points.

In 1973, he joined the Philadelphia Eagles for one season and finished his career in the short-lived World Football League as a member of the New York Stars in 1974 where he joined Super Bowl III alumni George Sauer, Jr, Randy Beverly, John Dockery, John Elliott, and Vito (Babe) Parilli. He was an All-WFL selection in 1974. Philbin was a member of the AFL All-Time Team.

Philbin died from dementia in Palm Beach Gardens, Florida, on June 25, 2025, at the age of 83.

== See also ==
- List of American Football League players
