= Mitch Dudek =

American football player (born 1943)

No. 73
- Position: Tackle

Personal information
- Born: November 9, 1943 (age 82); Evanston, Illinois, U.S.
- Listed height: 6 ft 4 in (1.93 m)
- Listed weight: 245 lb (111 kg)

Career information
- High school: St. George (Evanston)
- College: Xavier
- AFL draft: 1965: 19th round, 148th overall pick

Career history
- New York Jets (1966)
- Stats at Pro Football Reference

Mitch Dudek (born November 9, 1943) is an American former professional football player who was a tackle for the New York Jets of the National Football League (NFL) in 1966. He played college football for the Xavier Musketeers.
