= Randy Rasmussen (American football, born 1945) =

American football player (born 1945)

No. 66
- Position: Guard

Personal information
- Born: May 10, 1945 (age 81); St. Paul, Nebraska, U.S.
- Listed height: 6 ft 2 in (1.88 m)
- Listed weight: 255 lb (116 kg)

Career information
- High school: Elba (Elba, Nebraska)
- College: Nebraska–Kearney
- NFL draft: 1967: 12th round, 302nd overall pick

Career history
- New York Jets (1967–1981)

Awards and highlights
- Super Bowl champion (III); AFL champion (1968)

Career NFL statistics
- Games played: 207
- Games started: 199
- Fumble recoveries: 9
- Stats at Pro Football Reference

Randall Lee Rasmussen (born May 10, 1945) is an American former professional football player who was a guard for 15 seasons with the New York Jets of the American Football League (AFL) and later National Football League (NFL). He played college football for the Nebraska–Kearney Lopers and was selected 302nd overall by the Jets in the 12th round of the 1967 NFL/AFL draft. Rasmussen played for the Jets in the 1968 AFL Championship Game victory over the Oakland Raiders. He started in the Super Bowl III, in which the Jets defeated the Baltimore Colts.

He was the last of the starting Jets players to play in Super Bowl III to retire, playing his final game in the 1981 playoffs against the Buffalo Bills.

Rasmussen is one of five professional football players in history who attended the University of Nebraska at Kearney. He was the only one of those five to be selected in the NFL draft.

== See also ==
- List of American Football League players
