= George Sauer Jr. =

American football player (1943–2013)

No. 83
- Position: Wide receiver

Personal information
- Born: November 10, 1943; Sheboygan, Wisconsin, U.S.
- Died: May 7, 2013 (aged 69); Westerville, Ohio, U.S.
- Listed height: 6 ft 2 in (1.88 m)
- Listed weight: 195 lb (88 kg)

Career information
- College: Texas
- AFL draft: 1965: red shirt 5th round, 36th overall pick

Career history

Playing
- New York Jets (1965–1970); New York Stars (1974); Carolina Chargers (1979)

Coaching
- Carolina Chargers (1979) - Receivers Coach/Defensive Coordinator; Carolina Chargers (1980) - Head Coach

Awards and highlights
- Super Bowl champion (III); AFL champion (1968); 3× All-AFL (1966, 1967, 1968); 4× AFL All-Star (1966–1969); AFL receptions leader (1967); National champion (1963)

Career statistics
- Receptions: 309
- Receiving yards: 4,965
- Receiving touchdowns: 28
- Stats at Pro Football Reference

Head coaching record
- Regular season: 10–4–0 (.714)
- Postseason: 1–1–0 (.500)
- Career: 11–5–0 (.688)

George Henry Sauer Jr. (November 10, 1943 – May 7, 2013) was an American professional football player and coach who was a wide receiver for six seasons with the American Football League (AFL)'s New York Jets, and later played in the World Football League (WFL). He played college football for the Texas Longhorns. His father, George Henry Sauer Sr., played for the Green Bay Packers from 1935 through 1937.

== Biography ==
Sauer played college football for the Texas Longhorns as a wide receiver. He was a member of the undefeated 1963 Longhorns, and of the 1964 Longhorns that defeated previously unbeaten Alabama in the 1965 Orange Bowl. After being teammates at Texas, Sauer and quarterback Jim Hudson continued as teammates for the New York Jets for five seasons, 1965 through 1969. Sauer led the American Football League (AFL) in receptions in the 1967 season. In 1968, he started and caught eight passes for the Jets in the third AFL-NFL World Championship Game, helping defeat the NFL's heavily favored Baltimore Colts. His eight receptions and 133 yards led all receivers in that game.

Sauer retired at the peak of his career following the 1970 NFL season because he considered professional football dehumanizing. In a 1971 interview with the Institute for the Study of Sport and Society, Sauer said, "When you get to the college and professional levels, the coaches still treat you as an adolescent. They know damn well that you were never given a chance to become responsible or self-disciplined. Even in the pros, you were told when to go to bed, when to turn your lights off, when to wake up, when to eat and what to eat. You even have to live and eat together like you were in a boys’ camp." Sauer's father, on the subject of his son's retirement, stated, "He definitely does not like to be regimented."

In spite of his disillusionment about playing professional football, Sauer returned to play for the New York Stars of the World Football League in 1974. That season, Sauer caught 38 passes for 547 yards, good for 14.4 yards per catch and three touchdowns.

After retiring, Sauer pursued writing and completed a novel. He also coached the Carolina Chargers, a minor league football team, in the late 1970s - first as the receivers coach/defensive coordinator in 1979, then as the head coach in 1980. In both seasons, the Chargers went to and lost the Championship game and in his season as head coach the team went 10–4. He was let go at the end of the season for financial reasons. In 1979 he even activated himself for one game - his last game as a player.

As of 1994, the same year as his father's death, Sauer was a textbook graphics specialist living in Saint Paul, Minnesota. He died on May 7, 2013, in Westerville, Ohio, of congestive heart failure, having suffered from Alzheimer's disease.

== NFL career statistics ==
Legend
	Super Bowl champion
	Led the league
**Bold**	Career high

=== Regular season ===
Year	Team	Games		Receiving				
Year	Team	GP	GS	Rec	Yds	Avg	Lng	TD
1965	NYJ	14	11	29	301	10.4	33	2
1966	NYJ	14	**14**	63	1,079	17.1	**77**	5
1967	NYJ	14	**14**	**75**	**1,189**	15.9	61	6
1968	NYJ	14	**14**	66	1,141	**17.3**	43	3
1969	NYJ	14	**14**	45	745	16.6	40	**8**
1970	NYJ	14	12	31	510	16.5	67	4
Career		84	79	309	4,965	16.1	77	28

== See also ==
- List of American Football League players
