= John Dockery =

American football player and sportscaster (born 1944)

No. 43, 29
- Position: Cornerback

Personal information
- Born: September 6, 1944 (age 82); Brooklyn, New York, U.S.
- Listed height: 6 ft 0 in (1.83 m)
- Listed weight: 185 lb (84 kg)

Career information
- High school: Brooklyn Prep
- College: Harvard
- NFL draft: 1966: undrafted

Career history
- Miami Dolphins (1967)*; New York Jets (1967–1971); Pittsburgh Steelers (1972–1973); New York/Charlotte Stars (1974)
- * Offseason or practice squad member only

Awards and highlights
- Super Bowl champion (III); AFL champion (1968)

Career NFL/AFL statistics
- Interceptions: 8
- INT yards: 111
- Receptions: 1
- Receiving yards: 6
- Stats at Pro Football Reference

John Dockery (September 6, 1944) is an American sportscaster and former professional football defensive back who played for the New York Jets and later the Pittsburgh Steelers from 1968 to 1973. He graduated from Brooklyn Preparatory, a Jesuit high school, where he lettered in football, basketball, and baseball. He was signed as an undrafted free agent by the Jets out of Harvard. He spent the last two years of his playing career with the Steelers.

In 1965, he played collegiate summer baseball for the now defunct Sagamore Clouters of the Cape Cod Baseball League. A first-baseman, Dockery played alongside future major league manager Bob Schaefer under Clouters' manager Lou Lamoriello, who skippered the team to the 1965 league title.

Following his retirement, Dockery went on to co-host Sports Extra on WNEW Channel 5 (later renamed WNYW) in New York City with Bill Mazer. He also served as a color analyst for College Football on ABC and NFL on CBS telecasts as well as a sideline reporter for College Football on CBS and Notre Dame Football on NBC.

For the 1985 NFL season, Dockery was the color analyst in Week 11's Vikings-Lions game along with play-by-play Dan Dierdorf. Dockery traded positions with Dan Dierdorf as play-by-play of the Week 16's Packers-Buccaneers game with Dierdorf taking over as color analyst.

Dockery served as a sideline reporter for Monday Night Football broadcasts on Westwood One radio from 1999 to 2007. Prior to that, he served as analyst for the network's Sunday Night Football radiocasts, as well as sideline reporter for other games.

Dockery continues to serve the game of football by co-organizing a youth football camp with Joe Namath that is in this 44th year. Additionally after his sports career Dockery founded Cambridge Corporate Services in 1998, a New York–based outsourcing service provider.

== See also ==
- Other American Football League players
