= Bill Baird (American football) =

American football player (born 1939)

No. 46
- Position: Cornerback/Safety

Personal information
- Born: March 1, 1939 (age 87); Lindsay, California, U.S.

Career information
- College: San Francisco State

Career history
- New York Jets (1963–1969)

Awards and highlights
- Super Bowl champion (III); AFL champion (1968)

Career statistics
- Games played: 98
- Interceptions: 34
- Touchdowns: 3
- Stats at Pro Football Reference

Bill Baird (born March 1, 1939) is an American former professional football player who was a defensive back for the New York Jets of the American Football League (AFL). He played college football for the San Francisco State Gators, playing as a defensive back, halfback and kick returner. He played for the Jets from 1963 to 1969. He, Jim Hudson, Randy Beverly, and Johnny Sample completely shut down the Baltimore Colts' passing game in Super Bowl III, helping the Jets defeat what until that time had been touted as the greatest team in professional football history.

He later served as defensive backs coach for the New York Jets from 1981 to 1984.

== See also ==
- List of American Football League players
