= Johnny Sample =

American football player (1937–2005)

- Sample in 1960

No. 47, 44, 24
- Position: Defensive back

Personal information
- Born: June 15, 1936; Cape Charles, Virginia, U.S.
- Died: April 26, 2005 (aged 68); Philadelphia, Pennsylvania, U.S.
- Listed height: 6 ft 1 in (1.85 m)
- Listed weight: 203 lb (92 kg)

Career information
- High school: Overbrook (Philadelphia)
- College: Maryland State (1954–1957)
- NFL draft: 1958: 7th round, 79th overall pick

Career history
- Baltimore Colts (1958–1960); Pittsburgh Steelers (1961–1962); Washington Redskins (1963–1965); New York Jets (1966–1968)

Awards and highlights
- Super Bowl champion (III); 2× NFL champion (1958, 1959); AFL champion (1968); 5× Second-team All-Pro (1960, 1961, 1965, 1966, 1968); UPI First-team All-Pro (1961)

Career NFL/AFL statistics
- Interceptions: 41
- Fumble recoveries: 14
- Total touchdowns: 6
- Stats at Pro Football Reference

John B. Sample Jr. (June 15, 1936 – April 26, 2005) was an American professional football defensive back who played in the National Football League (NFL) for the Baltimore Colts (1958–1960), Pittsburgh Steelers (1961–1962), and Washington Redskins (1963–1965), and in the American Football League (AFL) for the New York Jets (1966–1968), winning three league championships.

Sample had the distinction of beginning and ending his career with championship wins in two of the most famous games in professional football history, and winning an NFL championship, an AFL championship, and a world championship.

In his rookie season, he won an NFL championship ring with the Colts in their victory over the New York Giants in the 1958 NFL Championship Game, which became known as "The Greatest Game Ever Played".

In his final season, he helped the Jets win the AFL Championship against the Oakland Raiders, and then to defeat the Colts in the third AFL-NFL World Championship (Super Bowl III) in January 1969, recording an interception in the Jets' 16–7 win. He is the only professional football player to have won all three: an NFL, AFL, and Super Bowl championship.

In between, Sample won another championship in the 1959 NFL Championship Game, scoring a touchdown on a 42-yard interception return in the Colts' 31–16 victory over the Giants.

== Early life ==
Sample grew up in Cape Charles, Virginia, the son of John B. Sample, a barber, and Evlyn Sample, a stenographer. He went to Northampton County High School. He attended Maryland State College, now the University of Maryland Eastern Shore, where he was a four-sport athlete in football, baseball, basketball and gymnastics. In football, he was named a Little All-American and in three seasons led the Hawks to a record of 28–1–1 and two Central Intercollegiate Athletic Association (CIAA) championships. In three years as a halfback and kicker, he totaled 2,381 rushing yards, 37 touchdowns, 42 conversions, and four field goals. He graduated in 1958 with a degree in physical education.

Sample in 1958 was said to be the first player from a historically black university to participate in the College All-Star Game, an annual exhibition held between professional rookies and the reigning NFL champion.

== Professional career ==
Sample finished his 11 professional football seasons with 41 interceptions, which he returned for 460 yards and four touchdowns. He also recovered 13 fumbles, returning them for 61 yards. On special teams, he returned 68 punts for 559 yards and a touchdown, along with 60 kickoffs for 1,560 yards and a touchdown. His most outstanding year was 1961 for the Steelers, when he intercepted a career-high eight passes for 141 return yards and one touchdown and led the NFL in punt return yards.

== After football ==
After his playing career ended, in 1970 Sample released a very outspoken autobiography, Confessions of a Dirty Ballplayer.

He later became known in tennis—he was the No. 1-ranked men's player by the United States Tennis Association (USTA) in the age 45 and over category for several years. During the 1980s and 1990s, he became a tennis official, a linesman, and even a chair umpire at bigger and bigger men's and women's events including the U.S. Open, Wimbledon, the French Open, and the Australian Open.

In 1977, he was inducted into the University of Maryland Eastern Shore Hawk Hall of Fame.

He also hosted a talk-radio show in Philadelphia. Sample died April 26, 2005, at Misericordia Hospital in Philadelphia. He was survived by a son and two daughters. He was preceded in death by one son.

== See also ==
- List of American Football League players
