= Earl Christy =

American football player (born 1943)

No. 45
- Positions: Defensive back, return specialist

Personal information
- Born: March 19, 1943 (age 83); Perryman, Maryland, U.S.

Career information
- College: Maryland Eastern Shore

Career history
- (1966–1969): New York Jets

Awards and highlights
- Super Bowl champion (III); AFL champion (1968)

Career statistics
- Kickoff return yards: 599
- Average: 24.0
- Touchdowns: 0
- Games played: 30
- Stats at Pro Football Reference

Earl Oliver Christy (born March 19, 1943) is an American former professional football player who was a cornerback for three seasons with the New York Jets of the American Football League (AFL). He played college football for the Maryland Eastern Shore Hawks.

== College ==
Earl “The Twirl" Christy better known by friends as "The Super Bowl Champ" or "Mr. Inspiration" was inducted into the Hawk Hall of Fame in 1984. Earl came to Maryland State College (MSC) from Perryman, Maryland in 1961. Earl attended Havre de Grace Consolidated School in Havre de Grace, Maryland. At the tiny all- Black school, Earl was known as “All World”. You name it and he did it. In track and field, Earl high jumped 6 feet and 4 inches and threw the shot put 49 feet and 9 inches. In addition, Earl’s basketball prowess was legendary. He had a 40-inch vertical leap and once scored an amazing 43 points in a single game while the opposing losing team scored a total 42 points. Earl was a four-year letterman on the Hawks’ football team. During his four-year career, the MSC Hawk football program compiled a record of 17 wins, 2 ties and 9 losses. Earl, a dean lists student, graduated from MSC in 1967 with a degree in Physical Education.

== NFL career ==
The New York Jets signed Earl in 1966 to play defensive back, kick off, and punt return specialist. Earl played for the N.Y. Jets for 3 years and was one of five Hawks who played in the 1968 Super Bowl (3 Jets and 2 Colts). He played for the New York Jets from 1966 to 1969. He played position of half back and defensive back and during Super Bowl III had a 25 yd kick off return. Earl ended his professional NFL career with 34 punt returns for 222 yards and 58 kick off returns for 1323 yards. Earl was an integral member of the Jets 1968 Super Championship team.

Earl Christy played both at the worst and best of the Jets' moments against their 1968 rival, the Oakland Raiders, being the Heidi Game and the AFL Championship against Oakland respectively.

=== Heidi Game ===
The 1968 season also saw the Jets involved in one of the most notorious incidents in television history, an incident that would change the way television networks carried sporting events for decades to come. On November 17, 1968, just before 7:30pm Eastern time, the Jets scored late to take a 32–29 lead over the Oakland Raiders with 1:05 left. NBC cut to a commercial, and then everywhere but the West Coast showed the movie Heidi, a show which NBC had promoted extensively for the sweeps period. Outraged fans bombarded NBC headquarters in New York with phone calls demanding the game be restored; so many phone calls were made that they eventually knocked out the NBC switchboard. Even though a decision was made to carry the game to conclusion, this decision could not be communicated, thus resulting in the movie starting on schedule.

Fans' ire was further fueled when they discovered that NBC's cutting away from the game denied them from seeing live a dramatic finish. On the Raiders' second play from scrimmage on the next drive, Daryle Lamonica threw a 46-yard touchdown pass to Charlie Smith, giving the Raiders a 36–32 lead. On the ensuing kickoff, Earl Christy of the Jets fumbled at the 10 yard line, which the Raiders' Preston Ridlehuber converted into another touchdown, ultimately giving the Raiders a 43–32 victory. Much of the country learned of this final outcome only via a bottom-of-screen crawl line shown during the movie. This incident, dubbed the Heidi Game, resulted in most television networks and sports leagues amending their television policies to ensure that games in progress would be broadcast to their conclusion, no matter what, even if it meant delaying or canceling the rest of the network's lineup, and even if the game's outcome seemed assured.

== Sources ==
- Career statistics from Pro Football Reference
