= Mark Smolinski =

American football player (born 1939)

No. 32, 30
- Positions: Fullback, tight end

Personal information
- Born: May 9, 1939 (age 87); Alpena, Michigan, U.S.
- Listed height: 6 ft 1 in (1.85 m)
- Listed weight: 215 lb (98 kg)

Career information
- College: Wyoming
- NFL draft: 1961: undrafted

Career history
- Baltimore Colts (1961–1962); New York Jets (1963-1968)

Awards and highlights
- Super Bowl champion (III); AFL champion (1968)

Career NFL/AFL statistics
- Rushing yards: 1,323
- Rushing average: 3.1
- Receptions: 103
- Receiving yards: 841
- Total touchdowns: 17
- Stats at Pro Football Reference

Mark Wayne Smolinski (born May 9, 1939) is an American former professional football player who was a running back in the National Football League (NFL) and American Football League (AFL). He played college football for the Wyoming Cowboys. Smolinski played for the NFL's Baltimore Colts and the AFL champion New York Jets.

== Personal life ==
Smolinski went to school in Rogers City, Michigan, where he now summers on Grand Lake in Presque Isle, Michigan. He married his wife Janice (Wetsch) Smolinski on June 1, 1968, and has three children: Shawn, Erica and Shadd. He has five grandchildren two that live in Northern Michigan, two in Montana and one in California.

== Coaching career ==
Upon retiring from professional football, Smolinski returned to Northern Michigan and took a coaching job at Petoskey High School in Petoskey, Michigan, where he currently resides.

== Historical Museum ==
In 2009, Smolinski was honored by the Presque Isle Historical Museum as "a hometown hero to several generations." The exhibit featured photos and memorabilia from both his high school days and his professional career.
