= Paul Crane =

American football player (1944–2020)

No. 56
- Position: Center

Personal information
- Born: January 29, 1944; Pascagoula, Mississippi, U.S.
- Died: November 1, 2020 (aged 76)
- Listed height: 6 ft 3 in (1.91 m)
- Listed weight: 212 lb (96 kg)

Career information
- High school: C. F. Vigor
- College: Alabama

Career history

Playing
- 1966–1972: New York Jets

Coaching
- 1974–1977: Alabama (assistant)
- 1978–1981: Ole Miss (assistant)
- 1991–1998: McGill–Toolen HS (AL)

Awards and highlights
- Super Bowl champion (III); AFL champion (1968); 2× National champion (1964, 1965); Consensus All-American (1965); First-team All-SEC (1965); Second-team All-SEC (1964)

Career statistics
- Interceptions: 5
- INT yards: 90
- INT return TDs: 1
- Fumble recoveries: 4
- Games played: 88
- Stats at Pro Football Reference

Paul Crane (January 29, 1944 – November 1, 2020) was an American professional football center for seven seasons for the New York Jets.

He graduated in 1962, from Vigor High School in Prichard, Alabama, near Mobile, and played college football for the University of Alabama.

Crane died on November 1, 2020, at the age of 76. He was one of at least 345 NFL players to be diagnosed after death with chronic traumatic encephalopathy (CTE), which is caused by repeated hits to the head.
