= Bruce Alford Jr. =

American football player (born 1945)

Bruce Alford
No. 38, 80, 46
- Position: Placekicker

Personal information
- Born: April 21, 1945 (age 81); Fort Worth, Texas, U.S.
- Listed height: 6 ft 0 in (1.83 m)
- Listed weight: 190 lb (86 kg)

Career information
- High school: R.L. Paschal (Fort Worth)
- College: TCU (1963-1966)
- NFL draft: 1967: 6th round, 119th overall pick

Career history
- Virginia Sailors (1967); Washington Redskins (1967); Buffalo Bills (1968–1969)

Career NFL/AFL statistics
- Field goals: 31 / 52
- Field goal %: 59.6
- Extra points: 41 / 43
- Stats at Pro Football Reference

Herbert Bruce Alford Jr. (born April 21, 1945) is an American former professional football player for the Washington Redskins and Buffalo Bills. He played collegiately for Texas Christian University.

== College career ==
As a placekicker, he played college football at Texas Christian University (TCU).

== Professional career ==
Alford was drafted by the Chicago Bears in the sixth round (119th overall) of the 1967 NFL draft. After failing to make the Bears' roster after training camp, he signed with the Washington Redskins. He played in weeks 13 and 14 for the Redskins in 1967, and he was released during final roster cuts on August 28, 1968. He then played for the American Football League's Buffalo Bills in 1968 and 1969.

== Personal life ==
He is the son of Bruce Alford Sr., who played for the New York Yankees of the All-America Football Conference (AAFC) and the New York Yanks of the NFL, and later became an on-field official.

== See also ==
- List of American Football League players
- List of family relations in American football
