= Curley Johnson =

American football player (1935–2016)

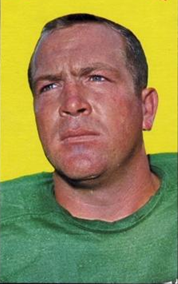

No. 33, 20
- Positions: Punter, running back, tight end

Personal information
- Born: July 2, 1935; Anna, Texas, U.S.
- Died: June 12, 2016 (aged 80); Granbury, Texas, U.S.
- Listed height: 6 ft 0 in (1.83 m)
- Listed weight: 215 lb (98 kg)

Career information
- High school: Woodrow Wilson (Dallas, Texas)
- College: Houston
- NFL draft: 1957: 7th round, 77th overall pick

Career history
- Dallas Texans (1960); New York Titans/Jets (1961–1968); New York Giants (1969)

Awards and highlights
- Super Bowl champion (III); AFL champion (1968); AFL All-Star (1965)

Career NFL/AFL statistics
- Punts: 559
- Punting yards: 23,651
- Longest punt: 73
- Stats at Pro Football Reference

John Curley Johnson (July 2, 1935 – June 12, 2016) was an American football punter who played in the American Football League (AFL) for the Dallas Texans and the New York Titans / Jets. He was part of the Jets team that won Super Bowl III. He also played one season for the National Football League (NFL)'s New York Giants.

== Early life ==
He graduated from Woodrow Wilson High School in Dallas, Texas. Johnson played college football at the University of Houston and was drafted in the seventh round of the 1957 NFL draft by the Pittsburgh Steelers.

== Professional career ==
While Johnson was drafted by the NFL, he did not make the cut. However, he found an opening with the upstart American Football League in 1960, where he played the opening season with Dallas. He moved on to the New York Titans (soon to be rechristened the Jets) in 1961 in free agency. Described as a spirted leader, he ended up as one of just four Titan players who ended up being on the Super Bowl III-winning roster in 1969. He played running back and tight end on occasion, rushing 64 times for 209 yards and catching 32 passes for 370 yards; in total, he scored four touchdowns in his career. The 1965 season saw him average 45.3 gross yards per punt that was a franchise record until Robert Malone broke the mark in 2012. In the only postseason games that Johnson played, he punted 14 times in the 1968-69 postseason, which included four punts in Super Bowl III, which went for 155 total yards.

In the entire history of the AFL (1960-1969), Johnson ranked second in punts with 537, where he averaged 42.5 yards per punt (13th best for all players to punt). His 22,718 punting yards is still a team franchise record and he also held the franchise record for punts until he was passed by Chuck Ramsey. He was released at the end of 1968 in a move that head coach Weeb Ewbank reportedly regretted later. Johnson played a few games for the Giants in 1969 before his career ended.

In his later days, Johnson was still a fan of the Jets and even asked the team as late as 1997 if he could do scouting for the team, once stating, "Coach Ewbank once told me you never get football out of your blood. I know now what he meant. I miss being part of the Jets and would love to do my part to help get us back to our Super Bowl days."

== Personal life ==
Johnson married his wife Janet on June 11, 1955. Married for 61 years, they had one son together named Curley Jr. He died on June 12, 2016 at his home in Granbury, Texas.

== See also ==
- List of American Football League players
