= Cornell Gordon =

American football player (born 1941)

No. 48, 28
- Position: Defensive back

Personal information
- Born: January 6, 1941 (age 85); Norfolk, Virginia, U.S.
- Listed height: 6 ft 0 in (1.83 m)
- Listed weight: 187 lb (85 kg)

Career information
- High school: Booker T. Washington (Norfolk)
- College: North Carolina A&T
- NFL draft: 1964: 16th round, 211th overall pick
- AFL draft: 1964: 23rd round, 179th overall pick

Career history
- New York Jets (1965–1969); Denver Broncos (1970–1972)

Awards and highlights
- Super Bowl champion (III); AFL champion (1968)

Career NFL/AFL statistics
- Interceptions: 14
- Fumble recoveries: 1
- Stats at Pro Football Reference

Cornell Kermit Gordon (born January 6, 1941) is an American former professional football player who was a defensive back for eight seasons in the National Football League (NFL). He played college football for the North Carolina A&T Aggies. He played in the AFL for the New York Jets and in the NFL for the Denver Broncos

== See also ==
- Other American Football League players
