= Jim Hudson =

American football player (1943–2013)

No. 22
- Position: Safety

Personal information
- Born: March 31, 1943; Steubenville, Ohio, U.S.
- Died: June 25, 2013 (aged 70); Austin, Texas, U.S.
- Listed height: 6 ft 2 in (1.88 m)
- Listed weight: 210 lb (95 kg)

Career information
- High school: La Feria (La Feria, Texas)
- College: Texas
- NFL draft: 1965: undrafted

Career history
- New York Jets (1965–1970)

Awards and highlights
- Super Bowl champion (III); AFL champion (1968); First-team All-AFL (1968); 2× Second-team All-AFL (1968, 1969); National champion (1963)

Career AFL/NFL statistics
- Interceptions: 14
- Interception yards: 195
- Games played: 54
- Stats at Pro Football Reference

James Clark Hudson (March 31, 1943 – June 25, 2013) was an American professional football defensive back. He was one of the first players to ever win a national championship in college and a Super Bowl as a professional. Hudson played for the New York Jets from 1965 to 1970, playing in both the American Football League (AFL) and National Football League (NFL). He started in Super Bowl III for the Jets, and made a key interception just before the end of the first half. Hudson also played quarterback in college.

== Early life ==
Hudson was born in Steubenville, Ohio, but he grew up in La Feria, TX, where his father, Maurice, a retired steelworker, had settled with his family. He was a stand-out athlete, excelling in basketball, track and football in high school. In 1961, he won the 2A State Championship in discus with a throw of 169–9.

== College ==
Jim Hudson played at various times wide receiver, running back, defensive back and quarterback at Texas and also returned punts. He began at Texas in 1961, and in 1962, his first year on the varsity, he played wingback and defensive back.

The following year, he played defense on the team that won the 1963 national championship. That season, he led the team in interceptions and recorded 5 tackles in the 1964 Cotton Bowl win over #2 Navy.

Hudson was moved to quarterback at the start of the 1964 season, but he was injured before the season started and replaced by Marvin Kristynik. Hudson's only start at quarterback came in the 2nd week against Texas Tech. He was injured on the first scoring play at the end of the first quarter and replaced by Kristynik for good. He saw little play for the rest of the season, until the 1965 Orange Bowl against #1 and National Champion Alabama. Kristynik struggled early, and Hudson was put in after a penalty turned a punt into a first down. He hit George Sauer, his future teammate in Super Bowl III, for a 69-yard touchdown pass and helped lead Texas to victory. In the process, he attracted the attention of Jets scouts who had come to watch Crimson Tide quarterback Joe Namath.

=== Records ===
- UT Record – Longest pass in a bowl game, (69), surpassed by James Street in 1969
- UT Record – Longest touchdown pass in a bowl game, (69), surpassed by James Street in 1969

== Pro ==
Undrafted, Hudson was signed by the Jets as a defensive back in 1965 joining his former teammate Sauer and opponent Namath. He and Sauer would continue as teammates for the New York Jets for five years from 1965 through 1969.

Hudson only played in 2 games in 1965, but he saw much more playing time from 1966 to 1969, recording 14 career interceptions over that period. In 1968, his best season, he had 85 tackles and 5 interceptions—7th best in the AFL—including one in the first half of Super Bowl III and he earned all league honors. Though most famous for his Super Bowl interception, his best game was likely the AFL Championship game just before that. The Jets might not have even made it to the Super Bowl if not for Hudson's play in that game. After stopping Warren Wells at the Jets 6 yard line following a 40-yard pass, Hudson was instrumental in keeping the Raiders out of the endzone on the following three plays, forcing Oakland to settle for 3. He knocked down another likely touchdown at the goal line in the 4th forcing another field goal. Then, on the last drive by the Raiders, he stopped Hewritt Dixon 1 yard short of a 1st down on a 4th and 9 play, giving the ball back to the Jets and sealing the 27–23 win for the Jets. During the same season, Hudson was thrown out of the infamous Heidi game.

The last two years of his career, his playing time reduced as knee injuries took their toll. He played through three knee operations and a bad back, then retired after six seasons.

== Later life ==
After retiring from the NFL, he and former San Diego Chargers quarterback, John Hadl formed an Austin-based real estate firm. When, in the 1970s, one of his clients asked him to join him the horse-racing business, Hudson became a successful trainer of quarter horses in Texas. He then switched to training thoroughbred horses in the 1980s, racing them at Louisiana Downs and then Oaklawn Park in Arkansas. Then he came back to Texas for the inaugural season of Lone Star Park.

He was inducted into the University of Texas Men's Hall of Honor in 2012.

Hudson later returned to Austin, Texas where he lived with his second wife Lise, until his death there on June 25, 2013. He died from what was originally deemed Parkinson's dementia, but since doctor's believed this had been caused by football-related trauma; his brain and spine were donated to researchers studying the relationship between head trauma and neurological disease at Boston University. They later defined the cause of death as traumatic dementia encephalopathy. He was 70 years old at the time of death.

Hudson was one of at least 345 NFL players to be diagnosed after death with this disease, which is caused by repeated hits to the head.
