= 1968 American Football League Championship Game =

Coordinates: 40.756°N 73.848°W

1968 AFL Championship Game
Oakland Raiders (Western) (12–2)	New York Jets (Eastern) (11–3)
23	27
Head coach: John Rauch	Head coach: Weeb Ewbank
	1	2	3	4	Total
OAK	0	10	3	10	23
NYJ	10	3	7	7	27
- Date: December 29, 1968
- Stadium: Shea Stadium; Queens, New York City, New York
- Attendance: 62,627

TV in the United States
- Network: NBC
- Announcers: Curt Gowdy, Kyle Rote

Location in the United States

The 1968 AFL Championship Game was the ninth annual title game of the American Football League, played on December 29, 1968, at Shea Stadium in Queens, New York City, New York. In a rematch of the notorious Heidi Game played earlier in the season, the New York Jets (11–3) of the Eastern Division hosted the defending champion Oakland Raiders (12–2) of the Western Division. Although the Raiders had the better record (on account of having prevailed in the aforementioned contest), the Jets were slight favorites. The Raiders had hosted a tiebreaker playoff game the week before against the Kansas City Chiefs (12–2) to determine the Western Division champion, while the Eastern champion Jets won their division outright and thus were idle.

Slightly favored, the Jets defeated the Raiders 27–23 to win the championship and the chance to play the Baltimore Colts in Super Bowl III.

== Game summary ==
A 28-yard punt by Oakland's Mike Eischeid gave New York the ball on the Raiders 44-yard line on their first possession, and they took advantage of the short field with a 4-play scoring drive. Joe Namath completed two 14-yard passes to Maynard on it, the second one a touchdown to give the Jets an early 7–0 lead. Meanwhile, Raiders quarterback Daryle Lamonica completed just one of his first 13 pass attempts. His first completion was a 36-yard pass to Billy Cannon, but the Raiders ended up with no points on that drive when George Blanda hit the cross bar attempting a 45-yard field goal. New York then drove to a 33-yard field goal by Jim Turner, giving them a 10–0 lead in the final minutes of the first quarter.

After being completely dominated up to this point, the Raiders offense finally got into gear as Lamonica completed passes to Pete Banaszak and Fred Biletnikoff for gains of 11 and 15 yards. Then he hit fullback Hewritt Dixon for a 23-yard gain on the last play of the first quarter. As the second quarter opened up, Lamonica finished the 80-yard drive with a 29-yard touchdown pass to Biletnikoff, making the score 10–7. The rest of the quarter would result in nothing but field goal attempts, with Turner missing one from 44 yards, but connecting from 35, while Blanda kicked a 26-yard field goal right before halftime to make the score 13–10.

Lamonica opened the third quarter with a 37-yard completion to Biletnikoff. Then his 40-yard pass to receiver Warren Wells gave Oakland a first down on the Jets 6-yard line. However, rush attempts over the next three plays resulted in just 5 yards. Faced with 4th and goal on the 1, coach John Rauch decided to play conservative and had Blanda kick a 9-yard field goal that tied the game at 13. New York responded by driving 80 yards in 14 plays to retake the lead, 20–13, on Namath's 20-yard touchdown pass to tight end Pete Lammons with one minute left until the 4th quarter.

Oakland responded to the touchdown with Lamonica's 57-yard completion to Biletnikoff setting up a 20-yard Blanda field goal, cutting the score to 20–16. Then Raiders defensive back George Atkinson intercepted a pass from Namath and returned it 32 yards to the Jets 5-yard line. On the next play, Banaszak ran the ball into the end zone, giving Oakland their first lead of the game at 23–20 with 8:18 remaining on the clock.

However, this turned out to be short lived. After starting out the ensuing drive with a 10-yard completion to George Sauer Jr., Namath completed a 52-yard pass to Maynard at the Raiders 6-yard line. On the next play, he connected with Maynard in the end zone, giving the Jets a 27–23 lead at the 7:47 mark. Oakland had three more drives with the time remaining, but failed to score each time. Oakland took the ball after Maynard's touchdown and drove to New York's 26-yard line, where they ended up faced with 4th down and 10. Even though more than 5 minutes remained in the game, Rauch decided to try to go for a first down rather than kick a field goal, but this did not pay off as Lamonica was sacked by New York lineman Verlon Biggs on the next play. Following a punt, Oakland drove to the New York 24-yard line, only to lose the ball again when Lamonica's intended swing pass to Charlie Smith sailed behind him, resulting in an accidental fumbled lateral that was recovered by linebacker Ralph Baker. The next time the Raiders got the ball, it was on their own 22-yard line with 42 seconds left in regulation. The Jets defense managed to stop the drive at midfield as time expired to preserve their lead and win the game, avenging their regular season loss to the Raiders in the infamous Heidi Game six weeks earlier.

On the cold windy day, neither quarterback distinguished themselves with passing accuracy. Namath completed 19 of 49 passes for 266 yards and 3 touchdowns, with 1 interception. Lamonica completed 20 of 47 passes for 401 yards and a touchdown. Biletnikoff was the leading receiver of the game with 7 receptions for 190 yards and a touchdown, while Maynard caught 6 passes for 118 yards and a score. Jets running back Matt Snell was the top rusher of the game with 71 yards on 19 carries, along with a 15-yard reception, while Emerson Boozer chipped in 51 rushing yards for New York. In addition to his 32-yard interception return, Atkinson returned 4 kickoffs for 112 yards. Oakland lost despite outgaining the Jets in total yards 443-400.

The attendance of 62,627 was a record for an AFL title game. As it turned out, this was the only AFL championship won by the Jets. Since the AFL-NFL merger that put the Jets in the American Football Conference, the Jets have never won the AFC Championship Game, losing all four times on the road. The Jets did not win another postseason game at home until 1986.

=== Box score ===
New York Jets 27, Oakland Raiders 23

Quarter	1	2	3	4	Total
Raiders	0	10	3	10	23
Jets	10	3	7	7	27

at Shea Stadium, Flushing, Queens, New York City

- Date: Sunday, December 29, 1968
- Game time: 1:00 p.m. EST
- Game weather: 38 °F (3 °C), windy
- Game attendance: 62,627
- Referee: Walt Fitzgerald
- TV announcers (NBC): Curt Gowdy, Kyle Rote
- Pro-Football-Reference.com

Game information

Scoring

- First quarter
  - NYJ – Don Maynard 14-yard pass from Joe Namath (Jim Turner kick), Jets 7–0
  - NYJ – Jim Turner 33-yard field goal, Jets 10–0
- Second quarter
  - OAK – Fred Biletnikoff 29-yard pass from Daryle Lamonica (George Blanda kick), Jets 10–7
  - NYJ – Jim Turner 36-yard field goal, Jets 13–7
  - OAK – George Blanda 26-yard field goal, Jets 13–10
- Third quarter
  - OAK – George Blanda 9-yard field goal. Tied 13–13
  - NYJ – Pete Lammons 20-yard pass from Joe Namath (Turner kick), Jets 20–13
- Fourth quarter
  - OAK – George Blanda 20-yard field goal, Jets 20–16
  - OAK – Pete Banaszak 4-yard rush (Blanda kick), Raiders 23–20
  - NYJ – Don Maynard 6-yard pass from Joe Namath (Turner kick), Jets 27–23

Top passers

- OAK – Daryle Lamonica – 20/47, 401 yards, 1 TD
- NYJ – Joe Namath – 19/49 yards, 266 yards, 3 TD, 1 INT

Top rushers

- OAK – Hewritt Dixon – 8 rushes, 42 yards
- NYJ – Matt Snell – 19 rushes, 71 yards

Top receivers

- OAK – Fred Biletnikoff – 7 receptions, 190 yards, 1 TD
- NYJ – Don Maynard – 6 receptions, 118 yards, 2 TD

== Officials ==
- Referee: Walt Fitzgerald (#18)
- Umpire: George Young (#23)
- Head linesman: Tony Veteri (#36)
- Line judge: Al Sabato (#30)
- Back judge: Hugh Gamber (#70)
- Field judge: Bob Baur (#58)

The AFL (and NFL) had six game officials in 1968; the seventh official, the side judge, was added in 1978.

== Players' shares ==
The Jets players each received $8,000 and the Raiders players each received $5,000.

With the win, this meant the Jets were guaranteed an additional $7,500 each, the loser's share in the Super Bowl, while the Super Bowl winners earned $15,000 each.

== Statistics ==
Statistics	Raiders	Jets
First downs	18	25
Rushing yards	50	144
Yards per carry	2.6	4.2
Passing yards	401	266
Sacked-Yards	2–8	2–10
Total yards	451	410
Fumbles-Lost	2–0	1–1
Turnovers	0	2
Penalties-Yards	2–23	4–26

== See also ==
- 1968 AFL season
- 1968 AFL playoffs
- AFL Championship Games
- Super Bowl III
- 1968 NFL Championship Game

== Video ==
No known copy of the broadcast of this game exists. Only recaps of NFL films footage have been located.

- You Tube - 1968 AFL & NFL Championship Games (Highlights) - from NBC pre-game for Super Bowl III w/ Curt Gowdy

Preceded by Oakland Raiders; 1967 AFL Champions	New York Jets; American Football League Champions; 1968	Succeeded by Kansas City Chiefs; 1969 AFL Champions
