= Jerry Jones =

American businessman and sports team owner (born 1942)

- Jones in 2026

Dallas Cowboys
- Title: Owner, president, general manager

Personal information
- Born: October 13, 1942 (age 84); Los Angeles, California, U.S.
- Listed height: 6 ft 0 in (1.83 m)
- Listed weight: 195 lb (88 kg)

Career information
- Position: Offensive lineman
- High school: North Little Rock (North Little Rock, Arkansas)
- College: Arkansas (1962–1964)

Career history
- Dallas Cowboys (1989–present) Owner / president / general manager

Awards and highlights
- Playing: National champion (1964); Operations: 3× Super Bowl champion (XXVII, XXVIII, XXX); 2014 NFL Executive of the Year
- Executive profile at Pro Football Reference
- Pro Football Hall of Fame

Jerral Wayne Jones Sr. (born October 13, 1942) is an American billionaire businessman who is the owner, president, and general manager of the Dallas Cowboys of the National Football League (NFL). He bought the team from Bum Bright in 1989.

Jones was born in Los Angeles, California, and moved to North Little Rock, Arkansas, as a child. His parents owned an independent grocery store. Jones was a running back at North Little Rock High School, graduating in 1960. Afterward, his family moved to Springfield, Missouri, where his father led a successful insurance company. Jones attended the University of Arkansas, co-captaining the 1964 national championship football team. Following graduation, he became an executive vice president at his family's insurance company. After selling it, the Joneses established Buena Vista Animal Paradise.

== Early life ==
Jones was born on October 13, 1942, in Los Angeles, California, to John "Pat" and Arminta Jones. The family moved back to North Little Rock, Arkansas, in 1945. His parents owned two branches of Pat's Super Market in the Rose City neighborhood of North Little Rock. Jones was a running back at North Little Rock High School, graduating in 1960.

After his graduation, Jones' parents moved to Springfield, Missouri, where Pat was president and chairman of Modern Security Life Insurance Co. The company, which an advertisement billed as a "one in a million" company, saw its assets increase from $440,299.76 in its first statement in 1961 to $6,230,607 in 1965 ($4,643,041.96 to $62,365,606.91 in 2024). After graduating from the University of Arkansas, Jerral W. Jones was listed as an executive vice president. With the success of the company, the Joneses assembled the 5,500-acre (2,200 ha) Buena Vista Ranch east of Springfield in Rogersville, Missouri, in the Ozark Mountains. In 1971, after selling the insurance company, the couple carved out 400 acres (160 ha) of their ranch to start Buena Vista Animal Paradise, where tourists could visit exotic animals (now Wild Animal Safari in Strafford, Missouri).

=== College football career ===
Jones attended the University of Arkansas, where he was a member of Kappa Sigma fraternity. He was co-captain of Arkansas' 1964 national championship football team. He was an offensive lineman for College Football Hall of Fame coach Frank Broyles and a teammate of college football and NFL coach Jimmy Johnson, whom Jones hired as his first head coach after purchasing the Cowboys.

Other notable teammates were Glen Ray Hines, a consensus All-American offensive tackle; Ken Hatfield, who went on to coach several major programs including Arkansas; Jim Lindsey; future Outland Trophy winner Loyd Phillips; and College Football Hall of Fame linebacker Ronnie Caveness. Several future head coaches were assistant coaches for Broyles on the Razorbacks' staff during Jones' college career in Fayetteville, including three more members of the College Football Hall of Fame: Hayden Fry (Southern Methodist University, North Texas State University, and the University of Iowa); Johnny Majors (Iowa State University, University of Pittsburgh, and the University of Tennessee), and Barry Switzer (University of Oklahoma, and later head coach of the Cowboys under Jones).

College statistics
Season	Receiving				Rushing			
Season	Rec	Yds	Avg	TD	Att	Yds	Avg	TD
1963	1	17	17	1	5	26	5.2	0
Total	1	17	17	1	5	26	5.2	0

== Business ventures ==
According to an interview with Jones on HBO, after graduating from college in 1965, he borrowed a million dollars from Jimmy Hoffa's Teamsters union to open up a string of Shakey's Pizza Parlor restaurants in Missouri. When that venture failed, Jones was given a job at his father's insurance company, Modern Security Life of Springfield, Missouri. He received his master's degree in business in 1970. After several other unsuccessful business ventures (including an attempt, again using Teamsters money, to purchase the American Football League's San Diego Chargers in 1966), he began an oil and gas exploration business in Arkansas, Jones Oil and Land Lease, which became successful. His privately held company currently does natural resource prospecting.

In 2008, Jones formed a partnership with Yankee Global Enterprises to create Legends Hospitality, a food, beverage, merchandise, retail, and stadium operations corporation serving entertainment venues.

== Dallas Cowboys ==
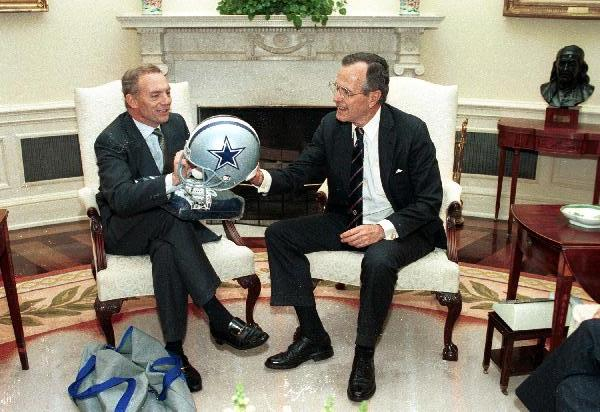
Jones gifts George H. W. Bush a Cowboys helmet, 1989

On February 25, 1989, Jones purchased the Cowboys from H. R. "Bum" Bright for $140 million (equivalent to $320 million in 2025). Soon after the purchase, he fired longtime coach Tom Landry, to that point the only coach in the team's history, in favor of his old teammate at Arkansas, Jimmy Johnson. At the time Johnson was the head coach of the University of Miami Hurricanes, whom he had led to a national championship in 1987. A few months later, Jones fired longtime general manager Tex Schramm and assumed complete control over football matters.

After a slow start under Jones and Johnson (the first season under Jones, a 1–15 finish, remains second only to the team's winless inaugural season in terms of futility), they quickly built a team often considered one of the best NFL franchises of the 1990s. The Cowboys won Super Bowl XXVII in the 1992 season, as well as Super Bowl XXVIII the following year. Johnson then departed and was replaced by Barry Switzer, who won Super Bowl XXX in the 1995 season.

At the time of the sale, the financially troubled Bright claimed to be losing $1 million per month on the franchise. During Jones' tenure, the Cowboys have appreciated in value to an estimated $12.5 billion, turning its owner into a billionaire in the process. Much of the league's financial success since 1989 has been credited to Jones himself. In particular, he was decisive in securing Fox as the NFC's primary broadcaster at a time when the traditional "Big Three" networks were trying to convince the league into accepting a rollback in television rights fees.

Increased television revenues have played a decisive role in securing the NFL's place as the world's richest sports league, with revenues of well over $1.2 billion per season.

=== Criticism ===
Gulfstream G-V N1DC Dallas Cowboys owner's personal plane at Van Nuys Airport

Despite success in the early years of his ownership of the Cowboys, the decades of mediocrity that have followed, as well as his hands-on approach have made him one of the most disliked NFL owners. In an online poll from October 8, 2003, Jones was named the least-favorite sports personality by Sports Illustrated, in three states (Virginia, Delaware, and Texas).

Jones is often vilified by fans who remain bitter at his unceremonious firings of longtime Cowboys personnel who were fan favorites, most notably head coach Tom Landry and personnel chief Gil Brandt, even though the Cowboys had done poorly the last few seasons before Jones became owner. Jones stated he did not give consideration to retaining Landry for even a season, as he said he would not have purchased the team unless he could hire Johnson as coach. Jones did not discuss the matter with Landry before announcing the decision. This was denounced by football fans and media as lacking class and respect. The Cowboys had long emphasized pride and tradition, and great performance and loyal service were expected to be rewarded. Since the dismissal, Jones indicated that he regrets the process of Landry's firing and his role in it. It later emerged that Jones' predecessor, Bright, had been dissatisfied with Landry for years and offered to relieve Jones of the inevitable criticism by dismissing the longtime coach himself prior to selling the team. Bright had wanted to fire Landry as early as 1987, only to have general manager Tex Schramm tell him that there wasn't a suitable replacement available.

Some of the fan criticism is due to Jones' high visibility and involvement as the "face of the team", a contrast to both Bright and the Cowboys' original owner Clint Murchison Jr. Jones's prominent role has led to fans expressing displeasure with Jones and the lack of success of the franchise, with particular criticism of Jones serving as his own general manager. There was particular criticism of Jones over his conflict with head coach Jimmy Johnson, as Jones "wanted Cowboys fans to know he had helped build those Super Bowl-winning teams", while "Johnson insisted that he made all of the personnel moves" because he had the final say in football matters and refused to relinquish this power. Consequently, Jones fired Johnson after the 1993 season despite coming off of two consecutive Super Bowl wins, and refused to induct Johnson into the Cowboys Ring of Honor for 30 years until December 30, 2023, after Johnson was inducted the Pro Football Hall of Fame in 2020. Jones also initially promised Bill Parcells, the Cowboys' head coach from 2003 through 2006, complete control over football matters; however, their relationship broke down after Jones signed controversial wide receiver Terrell Owens. Parcells' successor, Wade Phillips, complained to friends about being "undermined and second-guessed, repeatedly" by Jones.

Jones and Mike Brown of the Cincinnati Bengals are the only two active NFL owners who have the title or powers of general manager. Jones stated that working as his own general manager helps streamline decision-making and communication lines with the coaching staff. Over Jones' tenure, Cowboys fans have organized a number of grassroots efforts to displace Jones from his position.

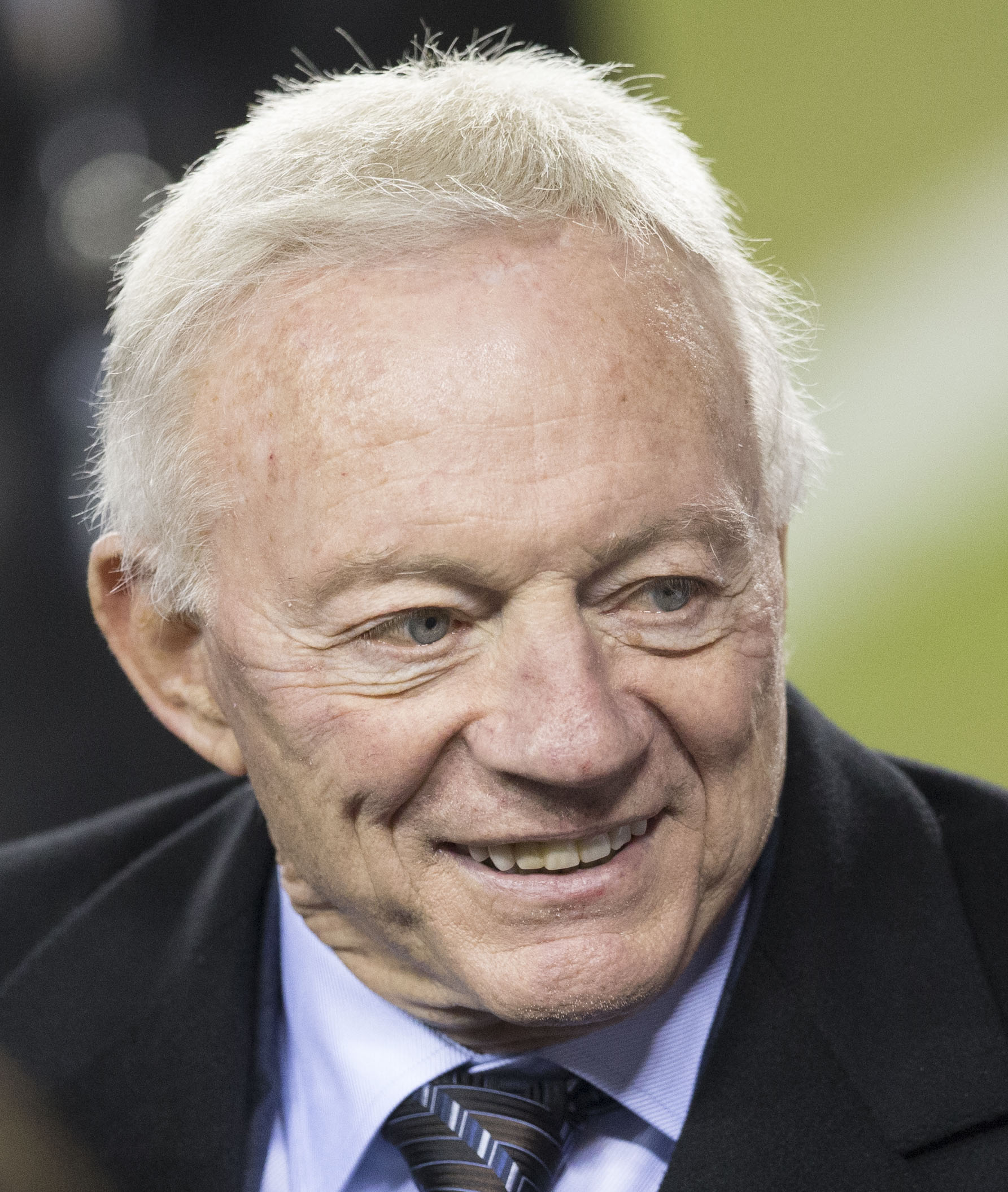
Jones in 2015

Jones is the subject of the 2008 book Playing to Win by David Magee. In the book, Jones admitted he handled the firing of Landry poorly and accepted some blame for the disintegration of his relationship with Landry's successor, Jimmy Johnson.

Jones became involved in the St. Louis Rams move back to Los Angeles with Rams owner Stan Kroenke in 2016. He was instrumental in brokering a deal between Kroenke, San Diego Chargers owner Dean Spanos, and Oakland Raiders owner Mark Davis to ensure that Kroenke's SoFi Stadium plan passed, which it did via a 30–2 owners' vote in favor. Jones' support and role in the negotiations were criticized by some fans and sports media in St. Louis. Jones was also a key proponent of the Oakland Raiders' move to Las Vegas to play at Allegiant Stadium.

In February 2021, the Great Texas Freeze caused the Texas power grid to fail and energy prices to surge due to deregulation. Official sources place the death toll at 246, while estimates range to over 700 that people may have died due to the weather and grid issues. Jones and his company Comstock Resources Inc. received criticism for raising prices over 70x the normal rates for natural gas and celebrating huge profits from the storm.

=== NFL fines ===
Jones was fined $25,000 by the NFL for publicly criticizing referee Ed Hochuli after Hochuli made a call in a game between the San Diego Chargers and the Denver Broncos on September 14, 2008. Jones made comments both to the press and on his radio show, saying Hochuli was one of the most criticized officials in the NFL. This was Jones' first fine by the NFL.

In 2009, Jones was fined $100,000 for violating a gag order on labor issues, commenting that revenue sharing was "on its way out". Commissioner Roger Goodell had issued a gag order for all owners and team executives from discussing any aspect of the pending labor issues. Jones "crossed the line", drawing a "six-figure" fine, sources said, as the commissioner distributed a memo to all 32 owners, along with a reminder that the gag order remains in effect. Goodell did not disclose the specific amount of Jones's fine in the memo.

In 2025, Jones was fined $250,000 for flipping his middle finger at fans during the Cowboys' game against the Jets. Although Jones claimed that the obscene gesture was "inadvertent", he did not appeal the fine.

== Jones in popular culture ==
Jones was the inspiration for the character Baxter Cain (Robert Vaughn), owner of the Dallas Felons, in the 1998 film BASEketball. He had a brief cameo appearance as himself in the 1998 made-for-television reunion movie Dallas: War of the Ewings.

Jones and Deion Sanders appeared together in several television commercials during Sanders' time with the Cowboys.

Jones also appeared as himself in a 1996 episode of the television show Coach and in a 2007 television commercial for Diet Pepsi MAX, which also featured then Cowboys head coach Wade Phillips and quarterback Tony Romo.

He appeared as himself in the seventh season of the HBO series Entourage in 2010, in an episode of the TNT incarnation of Dallas titled "Truth and Consequences", which aired on July 4, 2012, in a series of commercials for the 2012 season of ESPN's Monday Night Football, and in the season 4 premiere of The League. In 2013, Jones narrated a documentary film on former teammate and business partner Jim Lindsey.

Jones also appeared in a 2013 Pepsi commercial, walking into an elevator filled with three men wearing New York Giants apparel, who look at him with discontent.

He was parodied on the first episode, "Go Fund Yourself", of the eighteenth season of South Park, along with several other NFL team owners. In one scene, Jones is depicted as having huge, bulging chameleon-like eyes, as a young woman's head pops up from his lap. He reappears in the season 21 episode "Moss Piglets."

He appeared as himself in the ninth episode of Landman, titled "Wolf Camp", alongside Billy Bob Thornton and Jon Hamm.

He is depicted in season 14, episode 7 of King of the Hill "Any Given Hill-Day".

== Awards and honors ==
NFL

- Three-time Super Bowl champion – XXVII, XXVIII, XXX (as owner, president and GM of the Dallas Cowboys)
- 2014 NFL Executive of the Year

NCAA

- 1964 FWAA College Football National Championship (as a member of the Arkansas Razorbacks)
- 2010 NFF Gridiron Club of Dallas Distinguished Texan Award

Media

- 1993 Outstanding Team ESPY Award (as owner, president and GM of the Dallas Cowboys)

Hall of Fame

- Missouri Sports Hall of Fame (class of 1998)
- Arkansas Sports Hall of Fame (class of 1999)
- University of Arkansas Sports Hall of Honor (class of 2004)
- Arkansas Business Hall of Fame (class of 2010)
- Pro Football Hall of Fame (class of 2017)
- Cotton Bowl Hall of Fame (class of 2020)

Other

- 1993 Golden Plate Award of the American Academy of Achievement
- 2013 Horatio Alger Award
- Ducks Unlimited (Arkansas branch) Jerry Jones Sportsmans Award named in his honor

== Personal life ==
Jones married Eugenia Chambers in 1963, whom he met while both were college undergraduates. They have three children. Stephen is the Cowboys' chief operating officer, executive vice president, and director of player personnel. Charlotte is the Cowboys' executive vice president and chief brand officer. Jerry Jones Jr. is the Cowboys' chief sales and marketing officer/vice president. Jones splits his time between a home in Highland Park, Texas and a home in Destin, Florida.

Jones was close friends and neighbors with Kansas City Chiefs owner Lamar Hunt. The two lived in an upscale neighborhood in Dallas. Since 1998, their teams have played for the Preston Road Trophy, which was commissioned by Hunt to add a competitive nature to their friendship. When the trophy changed hands, Hunt and Jones usually played pranks on the other.

Jones revealed in July 2015 at a press conference before Cowboys training camp that he had undergone hip replacement surgery, joking that he would not start the season on the PUP list.

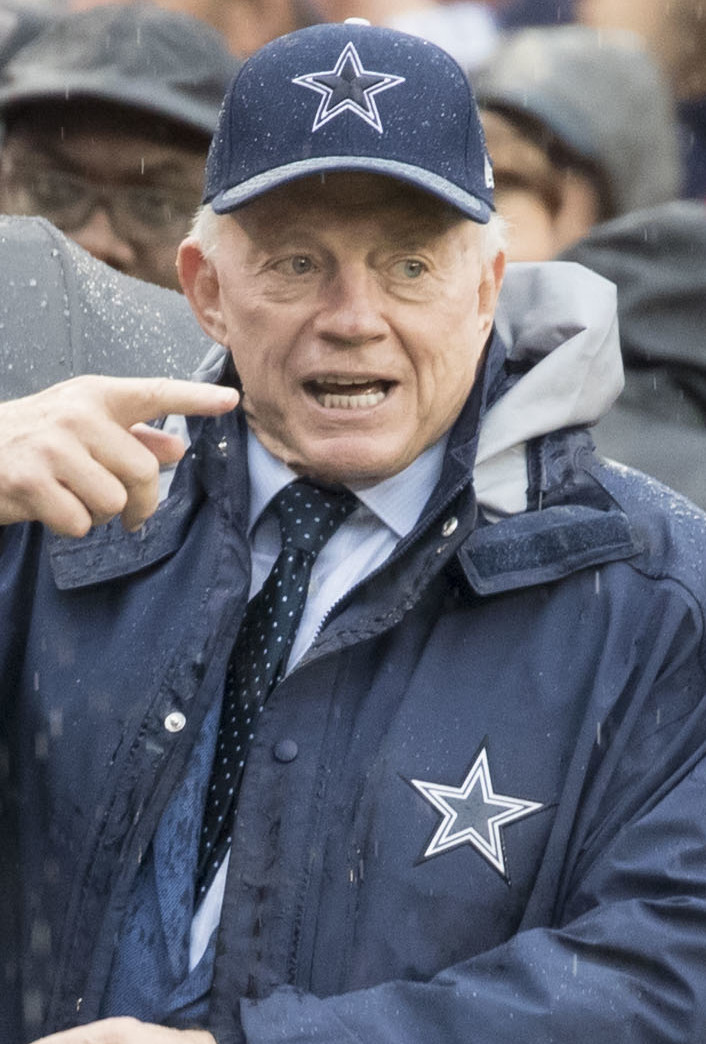
Jones in 2017

As of November 2024, Jones' net worth is reported by Forbes to be $16.1 billion, the majority of which can be accounted for as being his ownership stake in the Cowboys who are currently valued by the same publication to be the world's most valuable sports team at $10.1 billion.

In March 2022, Jones was served with legal action by a 25-year-old woman who claimed that he is her biological father. The woman is the daughter of a former airline employee that Jones met in Little Rock, Arkansas. Jones has paid nearly $3 million to the woman and her mother, which included the woman's full tuition at Southern Methodist University and a $70,000 Range Rover on her 16th birthday. Requests for money and other expenses exceeded the amount that Jones agreed to pay in the trust agreement between the parties by nearly $1 million over the years, including $33,000 for a "Sweet 16" birthday party, which was featured on the reality TV show Big Rich Texas. On February 29, 2024, a court decision required Jones to undergo a paternity test concerning the woman's claim. Concurrently, Jones filed a counter lawsuit for a breach of the original settlement agreement executed nearly two years after woman was born which included "If Mother or Child, or any person on behalf of Child, brings or commences any kind of legal proceeding seeking to establish the paternity of Child... , Putative Father may, in his sole discretion, elect to terminate the Agreement and the Funding Trust and the Distribution Trust, or either of them, and enforce any and all remedies available to him at law or in equity. A breach of this provision shall be considered a breach of the entire Agreement." During the trial in the countersuit, the trial abruptly ended as "Jones agreed to drop the countersuit if the women dismissed pending lawsuits against him, including one where the billionaire was ordered to take a DNA test".

In November 2022, a 1957 photo surfaced depicting a 14-year-old Jones witnessing White students attempting to prevent six African-American students from entering North Little Rock High School in Arkansas. North Little Rock was beginning to integrate in 1957. Despite the school's head football coach ordering the team (which Jones was a part of) to stay away from such scenes, Jones said he was there as a curious bystander. Jones also stated: "I don't know that I or anybody anticipated or had a background of knowing what was involved. It was more a curious thing." Jones has expressed regret in not doing more to help the Black students feel more accepted at Little Rock.

In 2025, Jones donated $1 million to MAGA Inc., a super PAC that supports Donald Trump.

In August 2025, Jones revealed that he was diagnosed with stage 4 cancer in 2010.

Sporting positions
Preceded by Bum Bright	Dallas Cowboys principal owner 1989–present	Incumbent
