= 1964 Rice Owls football team =

American college football season

1964 Rice Owls football
- Conference: Southwest Conference
- Record: 4–5–1 (3–3–1 SWC)
- Head coach: Jess Neely (25th season)
- Home stadium: Rice Stadium

1964 Southwest Conference football standings
	Conf.					Overall
Team	W		L		T	W		L		T
No. 2 Arkansas $	7	–	0	–	0	11	–	0	–	0
No. 5 Texas	6	–	1	–	0	10	–	1	–	0
Baylor	4	–	3	–	0	5	–	5	–	0
Texas Tech	3	–	3	–	1	6	–	4	–	1
Rice	3	–	3	–	1	4	–	5	–	1
TCU	3	–	4	–	0	4	–	6	–	0
Texas A&M	1	–	6	–	0	1	–	9	–	0
SMU	0	–	7	–	0	1	–	9	–	0
$ – Conference champion; Rankings from AP Poll

The 1964 Rice Owls football team represented Rice University during the 1964 NCAA University Division football season. In its 25th season under head coach Jess Neely, the team compiled a 4–5–1 record and outscored opponents by a total of 117 to 111. The team played its home games at Rice Stadium in Houston.

The team's statistical leaders included Walter McReynolds with 675 passing yards, Gene Fleming with 395 rushing yards and 30 points scored, and Billy Hale with 170 receiving yards. Malcolm Walker was selected by the Associated Press (AP) and the United Press International (UPI) as the first-team center on the 1964 All-Southwest Conference football team.

== Schedule ==
Date	Opponent	Site	Result	Attendance	Source
September 26	LSU*	Rice Stadium; Houston, TX	L 0–3	64,000	
October 3	West Virginia*	Rice Stadium; Houston, TX	W 24–0	25,000	
October 10	at Stanford*	Stanford Stadium; Stanford, CA	L 7–34	26,000	
October 17	at SMU	Cotton Bowl; Dallas, TX (rivalry)	W 7–6	24,000	
October 24	No. 6 Texas	Rice Stadium; Houston, TX (rivalry)	L 3–6	73,000	
October 31	Texas Tech	Rice Stadium; Houston, TX	T 6–6	15,000	
November 7	at No. 4 Arkansas	Razorback Stadium; Fayetteville, AR	L 0–21	33,000	
November 14	Texas A&M	Rice Stadium; Houston, TX	W 19–8	40,000	
November 21	TCU	Rice Stadium; Houston, TX	W 31–0	24,000	
November 28	at Baylor	Baylor Stadium; Waco, TX	L 20–27	22,338	
*Non-conference game; Rankings from AP Poll released prior to the game
