= Jim Lindsey =

American football player (1944–2026)

No. 21
- Position: Running back

Personal information
- Born: November 24, 1944; Caldwell, Arkansas, U.S.
- Died: July 19, 2026 (aged 81)
- Listed height: 6 ft 2 in (1.88 m)
- Listed weight: 210 lb (95 kg)

Career information
- High school: Forrest City (Forrest City, Arkansas)
- College: Arkansas
- NFL draft: 1966: 2nd round, 27th overall pick
- AFL draft: 1966: 2nd round, 17th overall pick

Career history
- Minnesota Vikings (1966–1972)

Awards and highlights
- NFL champion (1969); National champion (1964); Second-team All-SWC (1964)

Career NFL statistics
- Rushing yards: 566
- Rushing average: 3.2
- Receptions: 56
- Receiving yards: 632
- Total touchdowns: 11
- Stats at Pro Football Reference

James Edgar Lindsey (November 24, 1944 – July 19, 2026) was an American professional football player who was a running back for the Minnesota Vikings of the National Football League (NFL) from 1966 to 1972. He played college football for the Arkansas Razorbacks.

== Football career ==
=== Arkansas Razorbacks football ===
Lindsey was a member of the 1964 national championship-winning football team at the University of Arkansas, and founded Lindsey & Associates in Fayetteville, Arkansas in 1972. James Lindsey was a member of Kappa Sigma fraternity at the University of Arkansas - Xi Chapter. He completed a degree in mathematics.

He was a member of the University of Arkansas board of trustees and was a central to many of the decisions made by the board, including the hiring of head football coach Houston Nutt in 1997 and the decision to continue to play football games at War Memorial Stadium in Little Rock, Arkansas.

=== Minnesota Vikings ===
Lindsey was a running back for the Vikings, most often used for punting and kickoff returns. He played from 1966 to 1972.

== Real estate and golf ==
As a 21-year-old, Lindsey used his $75,000 NFL signing bonus to purchase a tract of land in Northwest Arkansas, his starting point in buying and selling real estate, an occupation he pursued during his off-seasons, and which became his main occupation after retirement from football. As of 2013, Lindsey's company owned more than 37,000 apartment units and 42 golf courses.

Lindsey Golf courses are located in Alabama, Arkansas, Kansas, Mississippi, Missouri, Oklahoma and Tennessee. Courses range from 9-18 holes, with many of them featuring a links style design. These courses tend to fill a niche for affordable public golf courses, but that are maintained at country-club level standards.

== Documentary film ==
In 2011, production began on a documentary film covering Lindsey's life. Narrated by Dallas Cowboys owner Jerry Jones, "The Jim Lindsey Story" details Lindsey's youth in the Arkansas Delta, role during the 1964 championship season, time in the National Football League, and rise in real estate. The film features interviews with College Football Hall of Fame coach Frank Broyles, former Arkansas head coach Ken Hatfield, former NFL players Fred Cox and Dave Osborn, and Pro Football Hall of Fame coach Bud Grant. Executive produced by Emmy Award winners Larry Foley and Dale Carpenter, the documentary is presented by the University of Arkansas's Walter J. Lemke Department of Journalism. "The Jim Lindsey Story" was scheduled for release in fall of 2013.

== Death ==
Lindsey died on July 19, 2026, at the age of 81, following a long illness.
