= Fred Marshall (American football) =

American football player (born 1942)

Profile
- Position: Quarterback

Personal information
- Born: January 21, 1942 (age 84); Memphis, Tennessee, U.S.

Career information
- High school: Messick High School
- College: University of Arkansas (1962–1964)

Awards and highlights
- National champion (1964); First-team All-SWC (1964); 1965 Cotton Bowl Classic Most Valuable Player

Fred Marshall (born January 21, 1942) is an American former football player. He grew up in Memphis and went to Messick High School there. He then enrolled at the University of Arkansas where he played college football at the quarterback position for the Arkansas Razorbacks football team from 1962 to 1964. He would earn an MBA at Harvard Business School in 1971.
