= 1964 Arkansas Razorbacks football team =

American college football season

1964 Arkansas Razorbacks football

FWAA national champion Helms national champion SWC champion

Cotton Bowl Classic, W 10–7 vs. Nebraska
- Conference: Southwest Conference

Ranking
- Coaches: No. 2
- AP: No. 2
- Record: 11–0 (7–0 SWC)
- Head coach: Frank Broyles (7th season)
- Captain: Seniors
- Home stadium: Razorback Stadium; War Memorial Stadium

1964 Southwest Conference football standings
	Conf.					Overall
Team	W		L		T	W		L		T
No. 2 Arkansas $	7	–	0	–	0	11	–	0	–	0
No. 5 Texas	6	–	1	–	0	10	–	1	–	0
Baylor	4	–	3	–	0	5	–	5	–	0
Texas Tech	3	–	3	–	1	6	–	4	–	1
Rice	3	–	3	–	1	4	–	5	–	1
TCU	3	–	4	–	0	4	–	6	–	0
Texas A&M	1	–	6	–	0	1	–	9	–	0
SMU	0	–	7	–	0	1	–	9	–	0
$ – Conference champion; Rankings from AP Poll

The 1964 Arkansas Razorbacks football team was an American football team that represented the University of Arkansas in the Southwest Conference (SWC) during the 1964 NCAA University Division football season. In their seventh year under head coach Frank Broyles, the Razorbacks compiled an undefeated 11–0 record (7–0 against SWC opponents), won the SWC championship, closed the regular season with five consecutive shutouts, outscored all opponents by a combined total of 231 to 64, and defeated Nebraska 10–7 in the Cotton Bowl.

The Razorbacks finished the season as the only major team with an undefeated and untied record after No. 1 Alabama lost to Texas (a team Arkansas defeated in Austin) in the Orange Bowl. However, the AP and UPI Coaches Polls became final before the bowl games were played, leaving one-loss Alabama as the AP and UPI national champion. The Football Writers Association of America (FWAA) conducted its final polling after the bowl games and selected Arkansas as the national champion. Arkansas was also selected as national champion by six other selectors, including the Billingsley Report and the Helms Athletic Foundation.

This team is notable for having the three top architects of the 1990s Dallas Cowboys resurgence that led to 3 Super Bowl victories from 1992 to 1995 and a 1994 NFC runner up after a 1994 NFC Championship Game appearance in Jerry Jones, now Cowboys owner, Jimmy Johnson, Cowboys head coach from 1989 to 1993 and Barry Switzer, Cowboys head coach from 1994 to 1997. Switzer was an assistant coach while Jones and Johnson were teammates and players.

== Schedule ==
Date	Time	Opponent	Rank	Site	TV	Result	Attendance	Source
September 19	2:00 p.m.	Oklahoma State*		War Memorial Stadium; Little Rock, AR		W 14–10	40,000	
September 26	2:00 p.m.	Tulsa*		Razorback Stadium; Fayetteville, AR		W 31–22	25,000–35,000	
October 3	1:00 p.m.	at TCU		Amon G. Carter Stadium; Fort Worth, TX	NBC	W 29–6	20,982	
October 10	2:00 p.m.	Baylor	No. 9	War Memorial Stadium; Little Rock, AR		W 17–6	41,000	
October 17	8:00 p.m.	at No. 1 Texas	No. 8	Memorial Stadium; Austin, TX (rivalry)		W 14–13	65,700	
October 24	2:00 p.m.	Wichita State*	No. 4	War Memorial Stadium; Little Rock, AR		W 17–0	38,000–39,000	
October 31	7:30 p.m.	at Texas A&M	No. 4	Kyle Field; College Station, TX (rivalry)		W 17–0	24,000	
November 7	2:00 p.m.	Rice	No. 4	Razorback Stadium; Fayetteville, AR		W 21–0	33,000	
November 14	2:00 p.m.	SMU	No. 3	Razorback Stadium; Fayetteville, AR		W 44–0	33,000	
November 21	1:00 p.m.	at Texas Tech	No. 3	Jones Stadium; Lubbock, TX (rivalry)		W 17–0	45,000	
January 1, 1965	1:00 p.m.	vs. No. 6 Nebraska*	No. 2	Cotton Bowl; Dallas, TX (Cotton Bowl Classic)	CBS	W 10–7	75,504	
*Non-conference game; Rankings from AP Poll released prior to the game; All times are in Central time

== Game summaries ==
=== Oklahoma State ===
Game One – Oklahoma State Cowboys at Arkansas Razorbacks – Game summary

Quarter	1	2	3	4	Total
Cowboys	0	0	7	3	10
Razorbacks	0	7	7	0	14

at War Memorial Stadium • Little Rock, Arkansas

- Date: September 19, 1964
- Game time: 2:00 p.m. CDT
- Game attendance: 40,000

Statistics	OK ST	ARK
First downs	18	11
Total yards		
Rushes/yards		
Passing yards		
Return yards		
Fumbles/lost		
Passing: Comp–Att–Int		
Punts/average		
Penalties/yards		
Time of possession		

Team	Category	Player	Statistics
Oklahoma State	Passing		
Oklahoma State	Rushing		
Oklahoma State	Receiving		
Arkansas	Passing		
Arkansas	Rushing		
Arkansas	Receiving		

Scoring summary

Quarter	Time	Drive			Team	Scoring information	Score	
Quarter	Time	Plays	Yards	TOP	Team	Scoring information	OK ST	ARK
"TOP" = time of possession. For other American football terms, see Glossary of American football.							10	14

=== Tulsa ===
Game Two – Tulsa Golden Hurricane at Arkansas Razorbacks – Game summary

Quarter	1	2	3	4	Total
Golden Hurricane	7	7	0	8	22
Razorbacks	0	10	21	0	31

at Razorback Stadium • Fayetteville, Arkansas

- Date: September 26, 1964
- Game time: 2:00 p.m. CDT
- Game attendance: 25,000–35,000

Statistics	TULSA	ARK
First downs		
Total yards		
Rushes/yards		
Passing yards		
Return yards		
Fumbles/lost		
Passing: Comp–Att–Int		
Punts/average		
Penalties/yards		
Time of possession		

Team	Category	Player	Statistics
Tulsa	Passing		
Tulsa	Rushing		
Tulsa	Receiving		
Arkansas	Passing		
Arkansas	Rushing		
Arkansas	Receiving		

Scoring summary

Quarter	Time	Drive			Team	Scoring information	Score	
Quarter	Time	Plays	Yards	TOP	Team	Scoring information	TULSA	ARK
"TOP" = time of possession. For other American football terms, see Glossary of American football.							22	31

=== at TCU ===
Game Three – Arkansas Razorbacks at TCU Horned Frogs – Game summary

Quarter	1	2	3	4	Total
Razorbacks	0	7	0	22	29
Horned Frogs	0	0	0	6	6

at Amon G. Carter Stadium • Fort Worth, Texas

- Date: October 3, 1964
- Game time: 1:00 p.m. CDT
- Game attendance: 20,982

Statistics	ARK	TCU
First downs		
Total yards		
Rushes/yards		
Passing yards		
Return yards		
Fumbles/lost		
Passing: Comp–Att–Int		
Punts/average		
Penalties/yards		
Time of possession		

Team	Category	Player	Statistics
Arkansas	Passing		
Arkansas	Rushing		
Arkansas	Receiving		
TCU	Passing		
TCU	Rushing		
TCU	Receiving		

Scoring summary

Quarter	Time	Drive			Team	Scoring information	Score	
Quarter	Time	Plays	Yards	TOP	Team	Scoring information	ARK	TCU
"TOP" = time of possession. For other American football terms, see Glossary of American football.							29	6

=== Baylor ===
Game Four – Baylor Bears at No. 9 Arkansas Razorbacks – Game summary

Quarter	1	2	3	4	Total
Bears	6	0	0	0	6
No. 9 Razorbacks	7	0	3	7	17

at War Memorial Stadium • Little Rock, Arkansas

- Date: October 10, 1964
- Game time: 2:00 p.m. CDT
- Game attendance: 40,000

Statistics	BAY	ARK
First downs		
Total yards		
Rushes/yards		
Passing yards		
Return yards		
Fumbles/lost		
Passing: Comp–Att–Int		
Punts/average		
Penalties/yards		
Time of possession		

Team	Category	Player	Statistics
Baylor	Passing		
Baylor	Rushing		
Baylor	Receiving		
Arkansas	Passing		
Arkansas	Rushing		
Arkansas	Receiving		

Scoring summary

Quarter	Time	Drive			Team	Scoring information	Score	
Quarter	Time	Plays	Yards	TOP	Team	Scoring information	BAY	ARK
"TOP" = time of possession. For other American football terms, see Glossary of American football.							6	17

=== at No. 1 Texas ===
Game Five – No. 8 Arkansas Razorbacks at No. 1 Texas Longhorns – Game summary

Quarter	1	2	3	4	Total
No. 8 Razorbacks	0	7	0	7	14
No. 1 Longhorns	0	0	0	13	13

at Memorial Stadium • Austin, Texas

- Date: October 17, 1964
- Game time: 8:00 p.m. CDT
- Game attendance: 65,700

Statistics	ARK	TEX
First downs		
Total yards		
Rushes/yards		
Passing yards		
Return yards		
Fumbles/lost		
Passing: Comp–Att–Int		
Punts/average		
Penalties/yards		
Time of possession		

Team	Category	Player	Statistics
Arkansas	Passing		
Arkansas	Rushing		
Arkansas	Receiving		
Texas	Passing		
Texas	Rushing		
Texas	Receiving		

Scoring summary

Quarter	Time	Drive			Team	Scoring information	Score	
Quarter	Time	Plays	Yards	TOP	Team	Scoring information	ARK	TEX
"TOP" = time of possession. For other American football terms, see Glossary of American football.							14	13

=== Wichita State ===
Game Six – Wichita State Shockers at No. 4 Arkansas Razorbacks – Game summary

Quarter	1	2	3	4	Total
Shockers	0	0	0	0	0
No. 4 Razorbacks	7	7	0	3	17

at War Memorial Stadium • Little Rock, Arkansas

- Date: October 24, 1964
- Game time: 2:00 p.m. CDT
- Game attendance: 38,000–39,000

Statistics	WICH ST	ARK
First downs		
Total yards		
Rushes/yards		
Passing yards		
Return yards		
Fumbles/lost		
Passing: Comp–Att–Int		
Punts/average		
Penalties/yards		
Time of possession		

Team	Category	Player	Statistics
Wichita State	Passing		
Wichita State	Rushing		
Wichita State	Receiving		
Arkansas	Passing		
Arkansas	Rushing		
Arkansas	Receiving		

Scoring summary

Quarter	Time	Drive			Team	Scoring information	Score	
Quarter	Time	Plays	Yards	TOP	Team	Scoring information	WICH ST	ARK
"TOP" = time of possession. For other American football terms, see Glossary of American football.							0	17

=== at Texas A&M ===
Game Seven – No. 4 Arkansas Razorbacks at Texas A&M Aggies – Game summary

Quarter	1	2	3	4	Total
No. 4 Razorbacks	10	7	0	0	17
Aggies	0	0	0	0	0

at Kyle Field • College Station, Texas

- Date: October 31, 1964
- Game time: 7:30 p.m. CST
- Game attendance: 24,000

Statistics	ARK	TX A&M
First downs		
Total yards		
Rushes/yards		
Passing yards		
Return yards		
Fumbles/lost		
Passing: Comp–Att–Int		
Punts/average		
Penalties/yards		
Time of possession		

Team	Category	Player	Statistics
Arkansas	Passing		
Arkansas	Rushing		
Arkansas	Receiving		
Texas A&M	Passing		
Texas A&M	Rushing		
Texas A&M	Receiving		

Scoring summary

Quarter	Time	Drive			Team	Scoring information	Score	
Quarter	Time	Plays	Yards	TOP	Team	Scoring information	ARK	TX A&M
"TOP" = time of possession. For other American football terms, see Glossary of American football.							17	0

=== Rice ===
Game Eight – Rice Owls at No. 4 Arkansas Razorbacks – Game summary

Quarter	1	2	3	4	Total
Owls	0	0	0	0	0
No. 4 Razorbacks	0	7	0	14	21

at Razorback Stadium • Fayetteville, Arkansas

- Date: November 7, 1964
- Game time: 2:00 p.m. CST
- Game attendance: 33,000

Statistics	RICE	ARK
First downs		
Total yards		
Rushes/yards		
Passing yards		
Return yards		
Fumbles/lost		
Passing: Comp–Att–Int		
Punts/average		
Penalties/yards		
Time of possession		

Team	Category	Player	Statistics
Rice	Passing		
Rice	Rushing		
Rice	Receiving		
Arkansas	Passing		
Arkansas	Rushing		
Arkansas	Receiving		

Scoring summary

Quarter	Time	Drive			Team	Scoring information	Score	
Quarter	Time	Plays	Yards	TOP	Team	Scoring information	RICE	ARK
"TOP" = time of possession. For other American football terms, see Glossary of American football.							0	21

=== SMU ===
Game Nine – SMU Mustangs at No. 3 Arkansas Razorbacks – Game summary

Quarter	1	2	3	4	Total
Mustangs	0	0	0	0	0
No. 3 Razorbacks	7	14	17	6	44

at Razorback Stadium • Fayetteville, Arkansas

- Date: November 14, 1964
- Game time: 2:00 p.m. CST
- Game attendance: 33,000

Statistics	SMU	ARK
First downs		
Total yards		
Rushes/yards		
Passing yards		
Return yards		
Fumbles/lost		
Passing: Comp–Att–Int		
Punts/average		
Penalties/yards		
Time of possession		

Team	Category	Player	Statistics
SMU	Passing		
SMU	Rushing		
SMU	Receiving		
Arkansas	Passing		
Arkansas	Rushing		
Arkansas	Receiving		

Scoring summary

Quarter	Time	Drive			Team	Scoring information	Score	
Quarter	Time	Plays	Yards	TOP	Team	Scoring information	SMU	ARK
"TOP" = time of possession. For other American football terms, see Glossary of American football.							0	44

=== at Texas Tech ===
Game Ten – No. 3 Arkansas Razorbacks at Texas Tech Red Raiders – Game summary

Quarter	1	2	3	4	Total
No. 3 Razorbacks	0	0	14	3	17
Red Raiders	0	0	0	0	0

at Jones Stadium • Lubbock, Texas

- Date: November 21, 1964
- Game time: 1:00 p.m. CST
- Game attendance: 45,000

Statistics	ARK	TTU
First downs		
Total yards		
Rushes/yards		
Passing yards		
Return yards		
Fumbles/lost		
Passing: Comp–Att–Int		
Punts/average		
Penalties/yards		
Time of possession		

Team	Category	Player	Statistics
Arkansas	Passing		
Arkansas	Rushing		
Arkansas	Receiving		
Texas Tech	Passing		
Texas Tech	Rushing		
Texas Tech	Receiving		

Scoring summary

Quarter	Time	Drive			Team	Scoring information	Score	
Quarter	Time	Plays	Yards	TOP	Team	Scoring information	ARK	TTU
"TOP" = time of possession. For other American football terms, see Glossary of American football.							17	0

=== 1965 Cotton Bowl Classic – vs. No. 6 Nebraska ===
Game Eleven – 1965 Cotton Bowl Classic: No. 6 Nebraska Cornhuskers vs. No. 2 Arkansas Razorbacks – Game summary

Quarter	1	2	3	4	Total
No. 6 Cornhuskers	0	7	0	0	7
No. 2 Razorbacks	3	0	0	7	10

at Cotton Bowl • Dallas, Texas

- Date: January 1, 1965
- Game time: 1:00 p.m. CST
- Game attendance: 75,504
- TV: CBS

Statistics	NEB	ARK
First downs	11	11
Total yards	168	176
Rushes/yards	44–100	34–45
Passing yards	68	131
Return yards		
Fumbles/lost	0–0	2–2
Passing: Comp–Att–Int	8–16–2	11–19–1
Punts/average	6–33.3	6–40.2
Penalties/yards	5–25	6–50
Time of possession		

Team	Category	Player	Statistics
Nebraska	Passing		
Nebraska	Rushing		
Nebraska	Receiving		
Arkansas	Passing		
Arkansas	Rushing		
Arkansas	Receiving		

Scoring summary

Quarter	Time	Drive			Team	Scoring information	Score	
Quarter	Time	Plays	Yards	TOP	Team	Scoring information	NEB	ARK
1	9:47	8	42		ARK	31-yard field goal by Tom McKnelly	0	3
2	7:45	10	69		NEB	Harry Wilson 1-yard touchdown run, Duncan Drum kick good	7	3
4	4:41	9	80		ARK	Bobby Burnett 3-yard touchdown run, Tom McKnelly kick good	7	10
"TOP" = time of possession. For other American football terms, see Glossary of American football.							7	10

Source: Razorback Bowl History – 1965 Cotton Bowl

Arkansas was invited to play in the 1965 Cotton Bowl Classic on January 1, 1965, against the Nebraska Cornhuskers. Arkansas' number-one rated defense was giving up only 5.7 points per game, while No. 7 Nebraska's scoring offense was averaging 24.9 points per contest.

Playing before a capacity crowd of 75,504 in Dallas, Arkansas opened the scoring with a field goal by Tom McKnelly in the first quarter. Nebraska took the lead in the second quarter on a one-yard touchdown run by Harry Wilson. Neither team scored in the third quarter. In the fourth quarter, fifth-year quarterback Fred Marshall, whose fumbles had stalled Arkansas in the first half, led the Razorbacks on a nine-play, 80-yard touchdown drive. The drive featured a scramble by Marshall for a first down after it appeared he would be sacked and two passes from Marshall to Jim Lindsey, the second taking the ball to the Nebraska five-yard line. Two plays later, junior tailback Bobby Burnett ran one yard for the game-winning touchdown with less than five minutes remaining in the game.

== Statistics ==
=== Team ===
==== Passing ====
Passing
Player	G	Cmp	Att	Pct	Yds	Y/A	AY/A	TD	Int	Rate
Gray	11	14	28	50.0	162	5.8	7.2	2	0	122.2

==== Rushing and receiving ====
Rushing & Receiving
		Rushing				Receiving				Scrimmage			
Player	G	Att	Yds	Avg	TD	Rec	Yds	Avg	TD	Plays	Yds	Avg	TD
Brasuell	11	178	551	3.1	3	11	112	10.2	0	189	663	3.5	3
Burnett	11	96	318	3.3	8	10	76	7.6	1	106	394	3.7	9
Gray	11	21	33	1.6	2					21	33	1.6	2
Hatfield	11	2	3	1.5	0					2	3	15	0
Crockett	11					7	121	17.3	1	7	121	17.3	1

==== Scoring ====
Scoring
		Touchdowns								Kicking				
Player	G	Rush	Rec	Int	FR	PR	KR	Oth	Tot	XPM	FGM	2PM	Sfty	Pts
Burnett	11	8	1						9					54
Brasuell	11	3							3					18
Gray	11	2							2					12
Crockett	11		1						1					6

==== Team stats ====
Team
		Passing					Rushing			
Split	G	Cmp	Att	Pct	Yds	TD	Att	Yds	Avg	TD
Offense	11	6.9	13.3	52.1	87.0	0.5	50.1	181.3	3.6	1.5
Defense	11	7.7	16.5	47.0	82.1	0.3	40.4	97.3	2.4	0.5
Difference		–0.8	–3.2	+5.1	+4.9	+0.2	+9.7	+84.0	+1.2	+1.0

==== Scores by quarter ====
	1	2	3	4	Total
Arkansas	10	31	28	11	80
Non-conference opponents	7	7	7	10	31

	1	2	3	4	Total
Arkansas	24	42	34	59	159
SWC opponents	6	0	0	16	22

	1	2	3	4	Total
Arkansas	34	73	59	70	236
All opponents	13	7	7	26	53

== Statistical leaders and award winners ==
The team's statistical leaders included Fred Marshall with 787 passing yards, Jack Brasuell with 551 rushing yards, Jim Lindsey with 385 receiving yards, and Bobby Burnett with 54 points scored (9 touchdowns).

Arkansas linebacker Ronnie Caveness was selected by the Associated Press (AP), Newspaper Enterprise Association, Football Writers Association of America, Time magazine, and the Sporting News as a first-team player on the 1964 College Football All-America Team. Caveness was later inducted into the College Football Hall of Fame.

Eight Arkansas players were selected by the AP or United Press International (UPI) as first-team players on the 1964 All-Southwest Conference football team: Caveness (AP-1, UPI-1); quarterback Fred Marshall (AP-1, UPI-1); offensive end Jerry Lamb (AP-1, UPI-1), offensive tackle Glen Ray Hines (AP-1, UPI-1), defensive halfback Ken Hatfield (AP-1), defensive guard Jim Johnson (AP-1), and defensive tackles Loyd Phillips (AP-1) and Jim Williams (AP-1).

== Split national championship and controversy ==
With its victory in the Cotton Bowl and Alabama's loss to Texas (a team Arkansas had defeated in Austin) in the Orange Bowl, Arkansas finished the 1964 season as the only major team with an undefeated and untied record. On January 6, 1965, a five-man committee of the Football Writers Association of America (FWAA) selected Arkansas as the winner of Look magazine's Grantland Rice Trophy as the top college football team in the country. Arkansas received four of five first-place votes, with Texas receiving the fifth vote. Alabama did not receive a single vote for first, second, or third place. The five members of the FWAA committee were Si Burick, Dayton Daily News; Fred Russell, Nashville Banner; Blackie Sherrod, Dallas Times Herald; Steve Weller, Buffalo Evening News; and Paul Zimmerman, Los Angeles Times. Arkansas is also recognized as the 1964 national champion by Billingsley Report, College Football Researchers Association, Helms Athletic Foundation, National Championship Foundation, Poling System, Sagarin, and Sagarin (ELO-Chess).

However, the final AP and UPI Coaches polls were released before bowl games were played, and Alabama therefore remained as the national champion in the AP and UPI Coaches' Polls. Because of the controversy, the AP Poll experimented with a voting model that took the final vote to select their champion after the bowl games in the 1965 season. In 1966, the AP Poll went back to taking the final vote at the conclusion of the regular season before finally adopting the post-bowl season model in 1968. The UPI Coaches' Poll adopted the post-bowl season model in 1974, a decade after the controversies surrounding the 1964, 1965, 1970, and 1973 national championships, seasons in which the winner of the Coaches' Poll went on to lose their bowl game.

== Roster ==
- Fred Marshall, QB
- Billy Gray, QB
- Ronny South, QB
- Charles Pisano QB
- Jack Brasuell, RB
- Jim Lindsey, RB
- Bobby Nix, RB
- Bobby Burnett, RB
- Ronnie Watkins, RB
- Eddie Woodlee, RB
- Jerry Lamb, WR
- Bobby Crockett, WR
- Richard Trail, WR
- Mike Bender, OL
- Glen Ray Hines, OL
- Jerry Jones, OL
- Randy Stewart, OL
- Jerry Welch, OL
- Gary Robinson, FB
- Dick Hatfield, OL
- Richard Cunningham, OL
- Tom McKnelly, K
- Jim Finch, DL
- Jimmy Johnson, DL
- Loyd Phillips, DL
- Bobby Roper, DL
- Gannon Sanders, QB
- Jim Williams, DL
- Ronnie Caveness, LB
- Ronnie Mac Smith, LB
- Ken Hatfield, DB
- Charles Daniel, DB
- Harry Jones, DB
- Martine Bercher, DB

James Pullen
