= 1964 Baylor Bears football team =

American college football season

1964 Baylor Bears football
- Conference: Southwest Conference
- Record: 5–5 (4–3 SWC)
- Head coach: John Bridgers (6th season)
- Captains: Bobby R. Maples; James W. Rust
- Home stadium: Baylor Stadium

1964 Southwest Conference football standings
	Conf.					Overall
Team	W		L		T	W		L		T
No. 2 Arkansas $	7	–	0	–	0	11	–	0	–	0
No. 5 Texas	6	–	1	–	0	10	–	1	–	0
Baylor	4	–	3	–	0	5	–	5	–	0
Texas Tech	3	–	3	–	1	6	–	4	–	1
Rice	3	–	3	–	1	4	–	5	–	1
TCU	3	–	4	–	0	4	–	6	–	0
Texas A&M	1	–	6	–	0	1	–	9	–	0
SMU	0	–	7	–	0	1	–	9	–	0
$ – Conference champion; Rankings from AP Poll

The 1964 Baylor Bears football team represented Baylor University in the Southwest Conference (SWC) during the 1964 NCAA University Division football season. In their sixth season under head coach John Bridgers, the Bears compiled a 5–5 record (4–3 against conference opponents), finished in third place in the conference, and were outscored by opponents by a combined total of 176 to 162. They played their home games at Baylor Stadium in Waco, Texas.

The team's statistical leaders included Terry Southall with 1,623 passing yards, Tom Davies with 401 rushing yards, and Larry Elkins with 851 receiving yards and 42 points scored. Bobby R. Maples and James W. Rust were the team captains.

== Schedule ==
Date	Opponent	Site	Result	Attendance	Source
September 26	at No. 7 Washington*	Husky Stadium; Seattle, WA	L 14–35	56,700–57,302	
October 3	Oregon State*	Baylor Stadium; Waco, TX	L 6–13	23,000	
October 10	at No. 9 Arkansas	War Memorial Stadium; Little Rock, AR	L 6–17	41,000	
October 17	Texas Tech	Baylor Stadium; Waco, TX (rivalry)	W 28–10	19,165	
October 24	Texas A&M^{†}	Baylor Stadium; Waco, TX (rivalry)	W 20–16	29,687	
October 31	at TCU	Amon G. Carter Stadium; Fort Worth, TX (rivalry)	L 14–17	22,119	
November 7	No. 6 Texas	Baylor Stadium; Waco, TX (rivalry)	L 14–20	39,686	
November 14	at Kentucky*	McLean Stadium; Lexington, KY	W 17–15	28,000	
November 21	at SMU	Cotton Bowl; Dallas, TX	W 16–13	15,000	
November 28	Rice	Baylor Stadium; Waco, TX	W 27–20	22,338	
*Non-conference game; ^{†}Homecoming; Rankings from AP Poll released prior to the game
