= 1964 Texas A&M Aggies football team =

American college football season

1964 Texas A&M Aggies football
- Conference: Southwest Conference
- Record: 1–9 (1–6 SWC)
- Head coach: Hank Foldberg (3rd season)
- Home stadium: Kyle Field

1964 Southwest Conference football standings
	Conf.					Overall
Team	W		L		T	W		L		T
No. 2 Arkansas $	7	–	0	–	0	11	–	0	–	0
No. 5 Texas	6	–	1	–	0	10	–	1	–	0
Baylor	4	–	3	–	0	5	–	5	–	0
Texas Tech	3	–	3	–	1	6	–	4	–	1
Rice	3	–	3	–	1	4	–	5	–	1
TCU	3	–	4	–	0	4	–	6	–	0
Texas A&M	1	–	6	–	0	1	–	9	–	0
SMU	0	–	7	–	0	1	–	9	–	0
$ – Conference champion; Rankings from AP Poll

The 1964 Texas A&M Aggies football team represented Texas A&M University in the 1964 NCAA University Division football season as a member of the Southwest Conference (SWC). The Aggies were led by head coach Hank Foldberg in his third and final season and finished with a record of one win and nine losses (1–9 overall, 1–6 in the SWC).

== Schedule ==
Date	Opponent	Site	Result	Attendance	Source
September 19	at LSU*	Tiger Stadium; Baton Rouge, LA (rivalry)	L 6–9	68,000	
September 25	at Houston*	Rice Stadium; Houston, TX	L 0–10	30,000	
October 3	Texas Tech	Kyle Field; College Station, TX (rivalry)	L 12–16	25,000	
October 10	at USC*	Los Angeles Memorial Coliseum; Los Angeles, CA	L 7–31	42,295	
October 17	TCU	Kyle Field; College Station, TX (rivalry)	L 9–14	21,500	
October 24	at Baylor	Baylor Stadium; Waco, TX (rivalry)	L 16–20	29,687	
October 31	No. 4 Arkansas	Kyle Field; College Station, TX (rivalry)	L 0–17	24,000	
November 7	at SMU	Cotton Bowl; Dallas, TX	W 23–0	32,000	
November 14	at Rice	Rice Stadium; Houston, TX	L 8–19	40,000	
November 26	at No. 5 Texas	Memorial Stadium; Austin, TX (rivalry)	L 7–26	65,000	
*Non-conference game; Rankings from AP Poll released prior to the game
