= 1964 TCU Horned Frogs football team =

American college football season

1964 TCU Horned Frogs football
- Conference: Southwest Conference
- Record: 4–6 (3–4 SWC)
- Head coach: Abe Martin (12th season)
- Offensive scheme: Meyer spread
- Home stadium: Amon G. Carter Stadium

1964 Southwest Conference football standings
	Conf.					Overall
Team	W		L		T	W		L		T
No. 2 Arkansas $	7	–	0	–	0	11	–	0	–	0
No. 5 Texas	6	–	1	–	0	10	–	1	–	0
Baylor	4	–	3	–	0	5	–	5	–	0
Texas Tech	3	–	3	–	1	6	–	4	–	1
Rice	3	–	3	–	1	4	–	5	–	1
TCU	3	–	4	–	0	4	–	6	–	0
Texas A&M	1	–	6	–	0	1	–	9	–	0
SMU	0	–	7	–	0	1	–	9	–	0
$ – Conference champion; Rankings from AP Poll

The 1964 TCU Horned Frogs football team represented Texas Christian University (TCU) in the 1964 NCAA University Division football season. The Horned Frogs finished the season 4–6 overall and 3–4 in the Southwest Conference. The team was coached by Abe Martin in his 12th year as head coach. The Frogs played their home games in Amon G. Carter Stadium, which is located on campus in Fort Worth, Texas.

== Schedule ==
Date	Opponent	Site	Result	Attendance	Source
September 19	at Kansas*	Memorial Stadium; Lawrence, KS	L 3–7	38,000	
September 26	Florida State*	Amon G. Carter Stadium; Fort Worth, TX	L 0–10	18,167	
October 3	Arkansas	Amon G. Carter Stadium; Fort Worth, TX	L 6–29	20,982	
October 10	Texas Tech	Amon G. Carter Stadium; Fort Worth, TX (rivalry)	L 10–25	23,902	
October 17	at Texas A&M	Kyle Field; College Station, TX (rivalry)	W 14–9	21,500	
October 24	Clemson*	Amon G. Carter Stadium; Fort Worth, TX	W 14–10	14,154	
October 31	Baylor	Amon G. Carter Stadium; Fort Worth, TX (rivalry)	W 17–14	22,119	
November 14	No. 5 Texas	Amon G. Carter Stadium; Fort Worth, TX (rivalry)	L 13–28	34,529	
November 21	at Rice	Rice Stadium; Houston, TX	L 0–31	24,000	
November 28	at SMU	Cotton Bowl; Dallas, TX (rivalry)	W 17–6	12,000	
*Non-conference game; Rankings from AP Poll released prior to the game
