= 1964 Texas Longhorns football team =

American college football season

1964 Texas Longhorns football

Orange Bowl champion

Orange Bowl, W 21–17 vs. Alabama
- Conference: Southwest Conference

Ranking
- Coaches: No. 5
- AP: No. 5
- Record: 10–1 (6–1 SWC)
- Head coach: Darrell Royal (8th season)
- Home stadium: Memorial Stadium

1964 Southwest Conference football standings
	Conf.					Overall
Team	W		L		T	W		L		T
No. 2 Arkansas $	7	–	0	–	0	11	–	0	–	0
No. 5 Texas	6	–	1	–	0	10	–	1	–	0
Baylor	4	–	3	–	0	5	–	5	–	0
Texas Tech	3	–	3	–	1	6	–	4	–	1
Rice	3	–	3	–	1	4	–	5	–	1
TCU	3	–	4	–	0	4	–	6	–	0
Texas A&M	1	–	6	–	0	1	–	9	–	0
SMU	0	–	7	–	0	1	–	9	–	0
$ – Conference champion; Rankings from AP Poll

The 1964 Texas Longhorns football team was an American football team that represented the University of Texas (now known as the University of Texas at Austin) as a member of the Southwest Conference (SWC) during the 1964 NCAA University Division football season. In their eighth year under head coach Darrell Royal, the Longhorns compiled an overall record of 10–1, with a mark of 6–1 in conference play, and finished second in the SWC behind the University of Arkansas who finished the season undefeated. Texas concluded their season with a victory over Alabama in the Orange Bowl.

In the 1965 Orange Bowl, Tommy Nobis made one of the most famous tackles in the game's history. On fourth-and-inches, and clinging to a 21–17 lead, he led his teammates to a game-saving halt of top ranked Alabama's quarterback, Joe Namath.

== Schedule ==
A heart-breaking 1-point loss to arch-rival Arkansas at Texas Memorial Stadium kept the Longhorns from repeating as National Champions. The Longhorns finished the regular season with a 9–1–0 record and defeated No.1 ranked Alabama in the 1965 Orange Bowl, 21–17.

Date	Time	Opponent	Rank	Site	TV	Result	Attendance	Source
September 19	7:30 p.m.	Tulane*	No. 4	Memorial Stadium; Austin, TX		W 31–0	60,000	
September 26	7:30 p.m.	at Texas Tech	No. 4	Jones Stadium; Lubbock, TX (rivalry)		W 23–0	43,000	
October 3	7:30 p.m.	Army*	No. 1	Memorial Stadium; Austin, TX		W 17–6	65,700	
October 10	2:30 p.m.	vs. Oklahoma*	No. 1	Cotton Bowl; Dallas, TX (rivalry)	NBC	W 28–7	75,504	
October 17	7:30 p.m.	No. 8 Arkansas	No. 1	Memorial Stadium; Austin, TX (rivalry)		L 13–14	65,700	
October 24	8:00 p.m.	at Rice	No. 6	Rice Stadium; Houston, TX (rivalry)		W 6–3	73,000	
October 31	1:00 p.m.	SMU	No. 6	Memorial Stadium; Austin, TX		W 7–0	59,000	
November 7	2:00 p.m.	at Baylor	No. 6	Baylor Stadium; Waco, TX		W 20–14	39,686	
November 14	2:00 p.m.	at TCU	No. 5	Amon G. Carter Stadium; Fort Worth, TX (rivalry)		W 28–13	34,529	
November 26	2:30 p.m.	Texas A&M	No. 5	Memorial Stadium; Austin, TX (rivalry)		W 26–7	65,000	
January 1	6:00 p.m.	vs. No. 1 Alabama*	No. 5	Miami Orange Bowl; Miami, FL (Orange Bowl)	NBC	W 21–17	72,647	
*Non-conference game; Rankings from AP Poll released prior to the game; All times are in Central time

== 1964 team players in the NFL ==
The following players were drafted into professional football following the season.

Player	Position	Round	Pick	Franchise
Ernie Koy, Jr.	Fullback	11	141	New York Giants
Olen Underwood	End	14	183	New York Giants

== Awards and honors ==
- Tommy Nobis, All-America selection
