= 1964 Texas Tech Red Raiders football team =

American college football season

1964 Texas Tech Red Raiders football

Sun Bowl, L 0–7 vs. Georgia
- Conference: Southwest Conference
- Record: 6–4–1 (3–3–1 SWC)
- Head coach: J. T. King (4th season)
- Offensive scheme: T formation
- Base defense: 4–3
- Home stadium: Jones Stadium

1964 Southwest Conference football standings
	Conf.					Overall
Team	W		L		T	W		L		T
No. 2 Arkansas $	7	–	0	–	0	11	–	0	–	0
No. 5 Texas	6	–	1	–	0	10	–	1	–	0
Baylor	4	–	3	–	0	5	–	5	–	0
Texas Tech	3	–	3	–	1	6	–	4	–	1
Rice	3	–	3	–	1	4	–	5	–	1
TCU	3	–	4	–	0	4	–	6	–	0
Texas A&M	1	–	6	–	0	1	–	9	–	0
SMU	0	–	7	–	0	1	–	9	–	0
$ – Conference champion; Rankings from AP Poll

The 1964 Texas Tech Red Raiders football team represented Texas Technological College—now known as Texas Tech University—as a member of the Southwest Conference (SWC) during the 1964 NCAA University Division football season. In their fourth season under head coach J. T. King, the Red Raiders compiled a 6–4–1 record (3–3–1 against conference opponents), tied for fourth place in the SWC, lost to Georgia in the 1964 Sun Bowl, and outscored opponents by a combined total of 166 to 120. The team's statistical leaders included Tom Wilson with 777 passing yards and Donny Anderson with 966 rushing yards and 396 receiving yards. The team played its home games at Clifford B. & Audrey Jones Stadium.

== Schedule ==
Date	Opponent	Site	TV	Result	Attendance	Source
September 19	Mississippi State*	Jones Stadium; Lubbock, TX		W 21–7	38,000	
September 26	No. 4 Texas	Jones Stadium; Lubbock, TX (rivalry)		L 0–23	47,100	
October 3	at Texas A&M	Kyle Field; College Station, TX (rivalry)		W 16–12	25,000	
October 10	at TCU	Amon G. Carter Stadium; Fort Worth, TX (rivalry)		W 25–10	23,902	
October 17	at Baylor	Baylor Stadium; Waco, TX (rivalry)		L 10–28	19,165	
October 24	SMU	Jones Stadium; Lubbock, TX		W 12–0	36,000	
October 31	at Rice	Rice Stadium; Houston, TX	NBC	T 6–6	15,000	
November 7	West Texas State*	Jones Stadium; Lubbock, TX		W 48–0	34,500	
November 14	Washington State*	Jones Stadium; Lubbock, TX		W 28–10	25,500	
November 21	No. 3 Arkansas^{†}	Jones Stadium; Lubbock, TX (rivalry)		L 0–17	45,000	
December 26	vs. Georgia*	Sun Bowl; El Paso, TX (Sun Bowl)	CBS	L 0–7	23,292	
*Non-conference game; ^{†}Homecoming; Rankings from AP Poll released prior to the game
