= 1964 SMU Mustangs football team =

American college football season

1964 SMU Mustangs football
- Conference: Southwest Conference
- Record: 1–9 (0–7 SWC)
- Head coach: Hayden Fry (3rd season)
- Home stadium: Cotton Bowl

1964 Southwest Conference football standings
	Conf.					Overall
Team	W		L		T	W		L		T
No. 2 Arkansas $	7	–	0	–	0	11	–	0	–	0
No. 5 Texas	6	–	1	–	0	10	–	1	–	0
Baylor	4	–	3	–	0	5	–	5	–	0
Texas Tech	3	–	3	–	1	6	–	4	–	1
Rice	3	–	3	–	1	4	–	5	–	1
TCU	3	–	4	–	0	4	–	6	–	0
Texas A&M	1	–	6	–	0	1	–	9	–	0
SMU	0	–	7	–	0	1	–	9	–	0
$ – Conference champion; Rankings from AP Poll

The 1964 SMU Mustangs football team represented Southern Methodist University (SMU) as a member of the Southwest Conference (SWC) during the 1964 NCAA University Division football season. Led by third-year head coach Hayden Fry, the Mustangs compiled an overall record of 1–9 with a conference mark of 0–7, placing last out of eight teams in the SWC.

== Schedule ==
Date	Opponent	Site	Result	Attendance	Source
September 19	at Florida*	Florida Field; Gainesville, FL	L 8–24	33,000	
September 26	at No. 5 Ohio State*	Ohio Stadium; Columbus, OH	L 8–27	80,737	
October 3	Arlington State*	Cotton Bowl; Dallas, TX	W 14–0	20,000	
October 17	Rice	Cotton Bowl; Dallas, TX (rivalry)	L 6–7	24,000	
October 24	at Texas Tech	Jones Stadium; Lubbock, TX	L 0–12	36,000	
October 31	at No. 6 Texas	Memorial Stadium; Austin, TX	L 0–7	69,000	
November 7	Texas A&M	Cotton Bowl; Dallas, TX	L 0–23	32,000	
November 14	at No. 3 Arkansas	Razorback Stadium; Fayetteville, AR	L 0–44	33,000	
November 21	Baylor	Cotton Bowl; Dallas, TX	L 13–16	15,000	
November 28	TCU	Cotton Bowl; Dallas, TX (rivalry)	L 6–17	12,000	
*Non-conference game; Rankings from AP Poll released prior to the game
