= Larry Elkins =

American football player (born 1943)

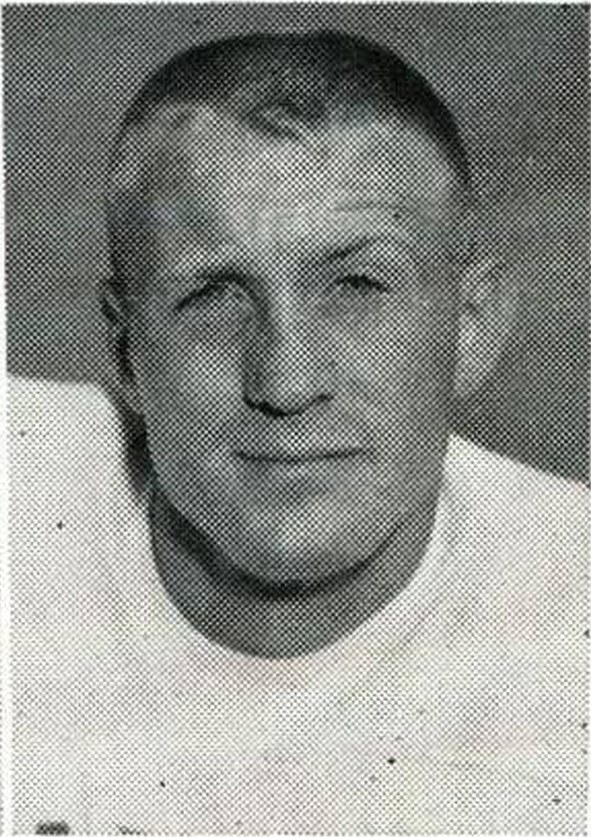
- Elkins, circa 1964

No. 26
- Position: Wide receiver

Personal information
- Born: July 28, 1943 (age 83); Brownwood, Texas, U.S.
- Listed height: 6 ft 1 in (1.85 m)
- Listed weight: 192 lb (87 kg)

Career information
- High school: Brownwood
- College: Baylor (1961-1964)
- NFL draft: 1965: 1st round, 10th overall pick
- AFL draft: 1965: 1st round, 1st overall pick

Career history
- Houston Oilers (1966-1967); Texarkana Titans (1970-1971)

Awards and highlights
- 2× Consensus All-American (1963, 1964); 2× First-team All-SWC (1963, 1964)

Career AFL statistics
- Receptions: 24
- Receiving yards: 315
- Receiving touchdowns: 3
- Stats at Pro Football Reference
- College Football Hall of Fame

Lawrence Clayton Elkins (born July 28, 1943) is an American former professional football player who was a wide receiver for the Houston Oilers of the American Football League (AFL). He was a two-time All-American playing college football as a flanker for the Baylor Bears before playing professionally for the Oilers.

== Early life ==
Elkins is the youngest of ten children. One of his mother's ex-husbands was Marshall Ratliff, best known as one of three perpetrators of the infamous Santa Claus Bank Robbery.

== College career ==
Elkins was an all-around athletic star at Brownwood High School and turned down a $25,000 baseball offer to enroll at Baylor University. He had received an offer from the Texas Longhorns, then coached by legend Darrell Royal, but chose Baylor on the recommendation of his high school coach Gordon Wood, who felt that the Bears' pro-style offense suited Elkins better. One of the best receivers in Baylor history, Elkins set an NCAA record with his seventy catches in 1963. Elkins also played safety for the defense and returned kicks. In 1962, he had a ninety-two-yard punt return against TCU. For his career, he caught 144 passes for 2,094 yards with a school-record nineteen touchdowns. He still shares Baylor's single-game record for receptions with twelve, which he caught against Texas in 1963. He ranks number three in all-time career receptions and career receiving yards.

Elkins was a consensus All-American his last two years (1963, 1964) — Baylor's first-ever two-time consensus pick. He played in the 1965 East-West Shrine Game, Coaches All-America Game, and Hula Bowl. He was MVP of the Hula Bowl. He appeared on the Tonight Show Dec. 3, 1964 as part of the Look Magazine All-American Football Team with his contemporaries Fred Biletnikoff, Craig Morton and Gale Sayers. He was chosen by Johnny Carson because of his deep Texas accent to simulate a television commercial.

Elkins was inducted into the Baylor Athletic Hall of Fame in 1976 and into the College Football Hall of Fame in 1994.

== Professional career ==
He was selected in the first round of the 1965 NFL draft by the Green Bay Packers and second overall in the 1965 AFL draft by the Houston Oilers, one selection after the New York Jets drafted Alabama quarterback Joe Namath. He was with Houston from 1965 to 1968. He suffered a knee injury in training camp with the Oilers in 1965 and was not on their active roster that year. His first season was 1966.

But Elkins' pro career never really got off the ground. After going to the Steelers, he broke his collarbone in a 1969 preseason game after earning a starting job with the Pittsburgh Steelers. "Rather unlucky, I suppose," he told the Baylor Line in 2001.

== After football ==
From 1971 to 1978 he worked for Brown and Root Inc. in the safety, health, and claims department, both in the United States and in Europe.
