= Ronnie Caveness =

American football player (1943–2014)

No. 50, 51, 55
- Position: Linebacker

Personal information
- Born: March 6, 1943; Houston, Texas, U.S.
- Died: May 10, 2014 (aged 71); Arkansas, U.S.
- Listed height: 6 ft 1 in (1.85 m)
- Listed weight: 225 lb (102 kg)

Career information
- High school: M.B. Smiley (Houston)
- College: Arkansas (1961-1964)
- NFL draft: 1965: 9th round, 121st overall pick
- AFL draft: 1965: 2nd round, 16th overall pick

Career history
- Kansas City Chiefs (1965); Houston Oilers (1966-1968)

Awards and highlights
- National champion (1964); 2× First-team All-American (1963, 1964); First-team All-SWC (1964); Second-team All-SWC (1963)

Career AFL statistics
- Fumble recoveries: 1
- Interceptions: 1
- Sacks: 1
- Stats at Pro Football Reference
- College Football Hall of Fame

Ronald Glen Caveness (March 6, 1943 – May 10, 2014) was an American professional football linebacker for the American Football League (AFL)'s Houston Oilers and Kansas City Chiefs from 1965 to 1968.

Caveness played college football for the University of Arkansas where he was a Football News first-team All-American in 1963. In his senior season in 1964, he was selected first-team All-America by the American Football Coaches Association, the Associated Press, the Football Writers Association of America, the Newspaper Enterprise Association and The Sporting News.

Caveness led the Razorbacks to an undefeated season in 1964 (11–0), winning the Southwest Conference championship, and defeated Nebraska in the 1965 Cotton Bowl, 10–7. Caveness was the Defensive MVP of the Cotton Bowl. Arkansas was the only undefeated team left after the bowl games, and was named the 1964 national champions by seven different selectors. Alabama was awarded the AP Poll and UPI Coaches Poll national titles, but only because, at that time, both polls gave out their championships before the bowl games. Alabama lost in the Orange Bowl to the Texas Longhorns, a team Arkansas beat.

Caveness also spent the 1973 season as a linebacker coach for the Houston Oilers. He was inducted into the College Football Hall of Fame in 2010.

He died of melanoma at the age of 71 on 10 May 2014. After death he was diagnosed with chronic traumatic encephalopathy. He was one of at least 345 NFL players to be diagnosed after death with this disease, which is caused by repeated hits to the head.

== See also ==
- List of American Football League players
