= Loyd Phillips =

American football player (1945–2020)

No. 86
- Position: Defensive end

Personal information
- Born: May 2, 1945; Fort Worth, Texas, U.S.
- Died: December 27, 2020 (aged 75); Springdale, Arkansas, U.S.
- Listed height: 6 ft 3 in (1.91 m)
- Listed weight: 240 lb (109 kg)

Career information
- High school: Longview (Longview, Texas)
- College: Arkansas (1963–1966)
- NFL draft: 1967: 1st round, 10th overall pick

Career history
- Chicago Bears (1967–1969)

Awards and highlights
- National champion (1964); Outland Trophy (1966); Unanimous All-American (1966); Consensus All-American (1965); 3× First-team All-SWC (1964, 1965, 1966)

Career NFL statistics
- Fumble recoveries: 1
- Interceptions: 2
- Sacks: 4
- Stats at Pro Football Reference
- College Football Hall of Fame

Loyd Phillips (May 2, 1945 — December 27, 2020) was an American professional football player and a member of the College Football Hall of Fame. He was the winner of the 1966 Outland Trophy as the country's most outstanding interior lineman while playing at the University of Arkansas. He was the tenth overall pick in the first round of the 1967 NFL/AFL draft by the Chicago Bears.

As a defensive tackle at Arkansas, Phillips was selected first-team All-American in both the 1965 and 1966 seasons after starting as a sophomore on the Razorbacks' 1964 national championship team. He was selected by the Associated Press, United Press International, Central Press, American Football Coaches Association, and the Walter Camp Football Foundation in 1965. In 1966, he was selected by the Associated Press, United Press International, Newspaper Enterprise Association, Central Press Association, American Football Coaches Association, Walter Camp Football Foundation, Football Writers Association of America, Sporting News and Time magazine in 1966. Phillips was inducted into the College Football Hall of Fame in 1992.

Phillips later returned to UA, earning a master's in education before working as an educator and administrator for Springdale Public Schools and Rogers Public Schools for almost 40 years.

Loyd's brother, Terry Don Phillips, was a defensive tackle for the Razorbacks from 1967 to 1969. He later enjoyed a lengthy career in collegiate athletics, serving as athletic director at Louisiana-Lafayette, Oklahoma State and Clemson.
