= Glen Ray Hines =

American football player (1943–2019)

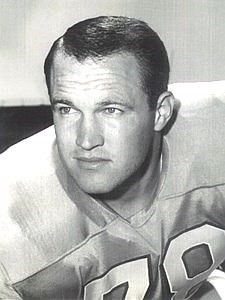

No. 78, 76
- Position: Offensive tackle

Personal information
- Born: October 26, 1943; El Dorado, Arkansas, U.S.
- Died: February 1, 2019 (aged 75); Fayetteville, Arkansas, U.S.
- Listed height: 6 ft 5 in (1.96 m)
- Listed weight: 265 lb (120 kg)

Career information
- High school: El Dorado
- College: Arkansas (1962-1965)
- NFL draft: 1965: 6th round, 82nd overall pick
- AFL draft: 1965: Red Shirt 2nd round, 10th overall pick

Career history
- Houston Oilers (1966-1970); New Orleans Saints (1971–1972); Pittsburgh Steelers (1973); Houston Texans-Shreveport Steamer (1974)

Awards and highlights
- AFL All-Star (1968, 1969); National champion (1964); Consensus All-American (1965); SWC Most Outstanding Player (1965); 2× First-team All-SWC (1964, 1965); SWC All-Time Team (1989); Razorback All Century Team (1994); Razorback Hall of Honor (2001); Houston Oilers All Time Team (2005); SWC Sports Hall of Fame (2018); Razorback All-Time Professional Team (2020); Sports Illustrated All-Time Razorback NFL Team (2022); Arkansas Sports Hall of Fame (2023)

Career NFL/AFL statistics
- Games played: 112
- Games started: 106
- Fumble recoveries: 3
- Stats at Pro Football Reference

Glen Ray Hines (October 26, 1943 – February 1, 2019) was an American professional football player who was a tackle in the American Football League (AFL) and National Football League (NFL). He played college football for the Arkansas Razorbacks, earning consensus All-American honors in 1965. He was a two-time AFL All-Star selection with the Houston Oilers.

== Early life ==
Hines was born on October 26, 1943, in El Dorado, Arkansas. He showed athletic prowess at a young age and was a two-sport standout in basketball and football at El Dorado High School. He played for head coach Garland Gregory, an Arkansas Hall of Fame football coach who also coached several other players who went on to play for the Arkansas Razorbacks, including fellow Arkansas All-Americans Jim Mooty and Wayne Harris.

== College career ==
Hines played collegiately for the University of Arkansas Razorbacks from 1961 to 1965. In 1964, Hines was the anchor of an offensive line that helped Arkansas win its only National Championship in football, and in 1965, he was a consensus All-American. The Houston Post named Hines the Southwest Conference Most Outstanding Player for the 1965 season, a rare honor for a lineman. In 1994, he was selected as a member of the Razorback All-Century team. He was named a member of the Express News San Antonio, All-Time Southwest Conference Football First-team Offense in July 1989. Hines was later inducted into the Arkansas Razorback Sports Hall of Honor in 2001 and the Union County (Arkansas) Sports Hall of Fame in 2012. In October 2018, Hines was inducted into the Southwest Conference Sports Hall of Fame.

== NFL career ==
Hines was selected by the NFL's St. Louis Cardinals and the American Football League's Houston Oilers in 1965. In 1966, he signed with the Oilers and played for them until 1969 in the AFL, and, in 1970, in the NFL. He played the 1971–72 seasons with the New Orleans Saints, and retired after his final season with the Pittsburgh Steelers in 1973.

An accomplished pass blocker at a time when offensive linemen were severely restricted in the use of their hands to block pass rushers, he was an AFL All-Star game selection – the AFL version of the Pro Bowl – in 1968 and 1969.

A model of durability, from his first season in 1966 through his final season in 1973, Hines started and played in 115 consecutive NFL games, including three playoff games. In 2000, the Tulsa World named Hines to its Area Pro All-Century Team. In the December, 2005 issue of Football Digest, Hines was named to the All-Time Houston Oilers Team.

In 2020, the Arkansas media named Hines to its All Time Razorbacks in Pro Football Team. Out of 355 Razorbacks to have ever gone on to play in the NFL or AFL, Hines was placed in the top 14. In 2022, Sports Illustrated named Hines to its All-Time University of Arkansas NFL Team. Hines and Jason Peters (still active) were named the top two Razorback offensive tackles in school history to play in the NFL.

The University of Arkansas's first-ever offensive tackle to make All-American, Hines was highly regarded by coaches and teammates. Former Oklahoma head coach and Arkansas assistant Barry Switzer said of Hines, “He was the only one who looked like he could be a pro football player we had playing on the offensive line. We didn’t have any people his size on defense or offense. He was a good kid. He had a good work ethic. He had a great smile on his face all the time. He went about his business and we felt like he would be a great pro prospect.” Hines would go on to protect legendary quarterbacks Terry Bradshaw and Archie Manning.

'We ran behind Glen Ray a lot,’ said contemporary and fellow offensive lineman Jerry Welch. Former Arkansas head coach and teammate Ken Hatfield described Hines as a gentle giant with exceptional toughness, noting, ‘He gave his all in practice and in games, was an excellent teammate, and a tremendous person.’

== Later life ==
Over the years, Hines became ambivalent about his football career and rarely discussed it. He rarely, if ever, attended games or reunions. He was disinterested in being recognized for his football accomplishments, and came to believe that his football career had caused severe cognitive and physical problems. He didn’t want his grandchildren to play the game.

Hines was later diagnosed with advanced dementia and probable chronic traumatic encephalopathy (CTE) due to his football career and donated his brain for post-mortem analysis to the Boston University CTE Center. Due to his declining neurological and physical condition, Hines was unable to attend his Southwest Conference Sports Hall of Fame induction ceremony held in November, 2018, and was represented by his son Wes and daughter Shelia, who accepted the award on his behalf. Hines would pass away only three months later.

In January, 2020, the Boston University CTE Center announced that Hines was diagnosed with stage 4 CTE, the most advanced and severe form of CTE. In articles published in Sports Illustrated, Medium, and on the Concussion Legacy Foundation's website, Hines’ son Glen, a former football and baseball player at Arkansas, Marine Corps Colonel, and author, described Hines’ rapid physical and cognitive decline in his later years and how the family's efforts to secure funding for medical care and treatment under the National Football League's settlement with players - which were supported by the requisite diagnoses made by numerous board-certified doctors - were nevertheless intentionally drawn out, delayed, and belatedly rejected by the NFL in the months before Hines died in February, 2019. He was one of at least 345 NFL players to be diagnosed after death with chronic traumatic encephalopathy (CTE), which is caused by repeated hits to the head.

Hines' physical and cognitive decline from stage 4 CTE in his later years and the NFL's rejection of the family's claims for life-sustaining medical care and treatment under the designedly convoluted settlement process with former players were chronicled in the Welcome to the Machine podcast in the fall, 2021 and the book published in September, 2023.

In January, 2024, Pulitzer-prize winning journalist Will Hobson of the Washington Post published the results of a lengthy investigation into the NFL’s handling of claims under the league’s settlement of the class action lawsuit filed by hundreds of former players. The Post investigation revealed that the league was routinely denying claims for payment and benefits for former players who were diagnosed by board-certified doctors with neurological diseases such as dementia and probable CTE from playing football. The investigation revealed that although players had been treated and diagnosed sometimes by multiple doctors, different doctors hired by the NFL would nevertheless overturn those diagnoses without the league’s doctor ever having ever met or treated the player. Hines’s case was featured prominently in the Washington Post report, which stated that the NFL’s doctor who never met or treated Hines denied Hines’s claim solely because he could sometimes operate a vehicle and walk on a treadmill.

== See also ==
- Other American Football League players
- List of NFL players with chronic traumatic encephalopathy
