= Malcolm Walker (American football) =

American football player (1943–2022)

No. 57, 54
- Positions: Center, Tackle

Personal information
- Born: May 24, 1943; Dallas, Texas, U.S.
- Died: May 9, 2022 (aged 78); Dallas, Texas, U.S.
- Listed height: 6 ft 4 in (1.93 m)
- Listed weight: 250 lb (113 kg)

Career information
- High school: South Oak Cliff (Dallas)
- College: Rice (1961-1964)
- NFL draft: 1965: 2nd round, 19th overall pick
- AFL draft: 1965: 2nd round, 10th overall pick

Career history
- Dallas Cowboys (1965–1969); Green Bay Packers (1970)

Awards and highlights
- Second-team All-American (1963); Third-team All-American (1964); 2× First-team All-SWC (1963, 1964)

Career NFL statistics
- Games played: 58
- Games started: 32
- Fumble recoveries: 5
- Stats at Pro Football Reference

Malcolm Walker (May 24, 1943 – May 9, 2022) was an American professional football player who was a center in the National Football League (NFL) for the Dallas Cowboys and Green Bay Packers. He played college football for the Rice Owls.

== Early life ==
Walker attended South Oak Cliff High School, where he practiced football and basketball, receiving All-City honors in both sports.

He accepted a football scholarship from Rice University in 1966, where he was a two-way player and a three-year starter, playing center on offense and linebacker on defense.

He was a two-time All-SWC selection (1963 and 1964), a first-team (1964) and third-team All-American (1963). He also was an All-Academic selection as mathematics major. As a senior, he played in the East–West Shrine Game, the Senior Bowl and the Chicago College All-Star Game.

Walker was named one of the 55 greatest football players at Rice University and was inducted into the Rice Athletics Hall of Fame in 1976.

== Professional career ==
=== Dallas Cowboys ===
Walker was selected by the Dallas Cowboys in the second round (10th overall) of the 1965 NFL draft and also in the second round (19th overall) of the 1965 AFL draft by the Houston Oilers. As a rookie, he was placed on the injured reserve list, after suffering a knee injury while practicing for the Chicago College All-Star Game, which would affect him during the rest of his career (eventually had 3 knee operations).

In 1966, he was moved to tackle because of the depth at the center position and was later placed on the taxi squad, because he wasn't fully recovered from his previous injury. That season, he appeared in the last 5 games, playing mainly on special teams.

Walker became the team's starting center over Dave Manders, playing in all 14 games during the 1968 and 1969 seasons. After playing with multiple injuries the previous year, he was traded along with Clarence Williams to the Green Bay Packers in exchange for Herb Adderley on September 1, 1970. That season, he appeared in the last 5 games, playing mainly on special teams.

=== Green Bay Packers ===
In 1970, he appeared in 11 games, with 4 starts, for the Green Bay Packers. On July 20, 1971, he was waived after failing a physical for problems with his knee.

== Personal life ==
While playing for the Cowboys, Walker studied accounting at SMU and became a Certified Public Accountant. After retiring from the Packers, he joined a large accounting firm and served as a special assistant to the football team at St. Mark's School of Texas. In 1974, he opened his own accounting firm. On May 9, 2022, he died at the age of 78, after suffering from cancer.
