= Ken Hatfield =

American football player and coach (born 1943)

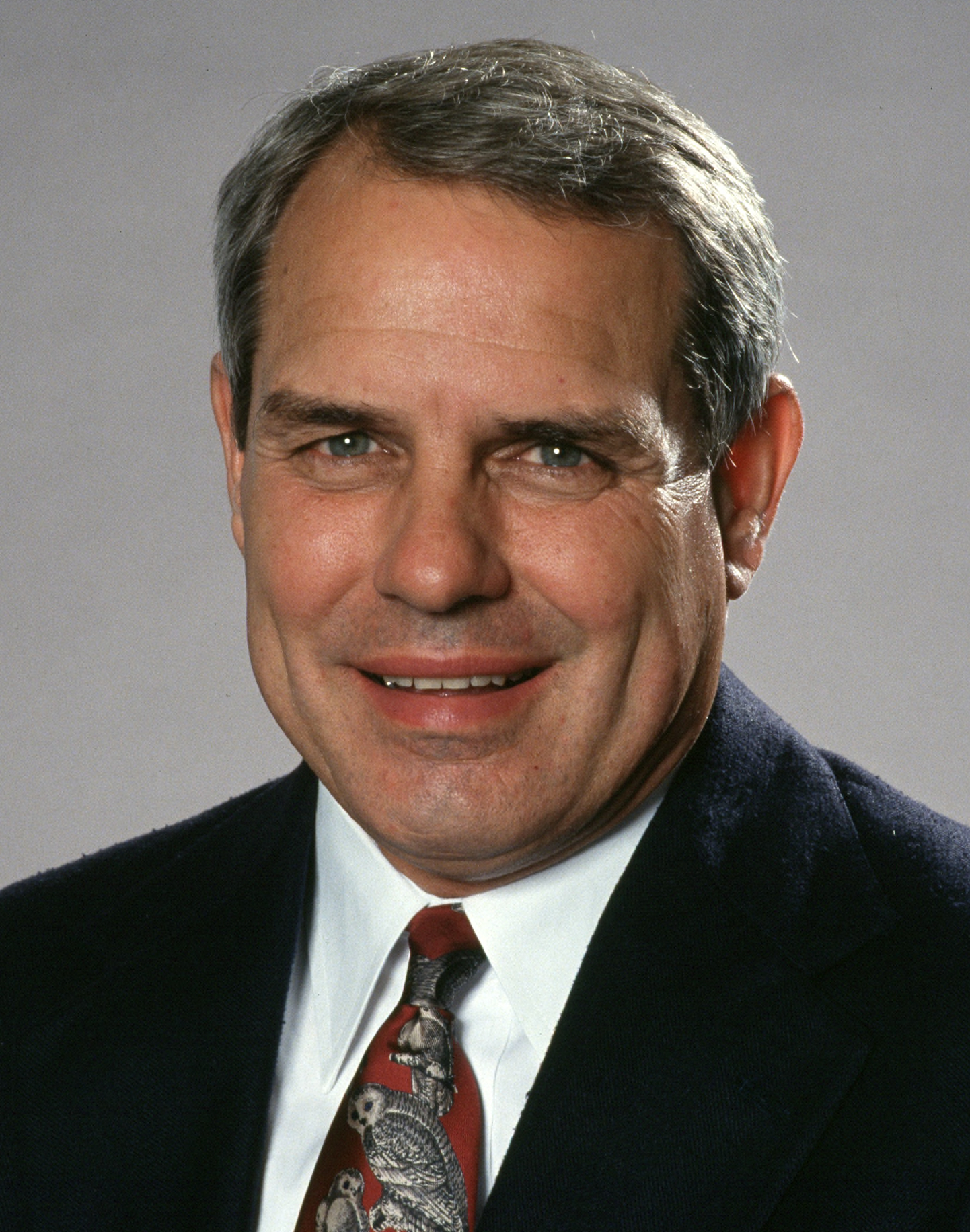
- Hatfield, c. 1994, as Rice football coach

Biographical details
- Born: June 6, 1943 (age 83); Helena, Arkansas, U.S.

Playing career
- 1961–1964: Arkansas
- Position: Defensive back

Coaching career (HC unless noted)
- 1968: Tennessee (assistant freshmen)
- 1969: Tennessee (freshmen)
- 1970: Tennessee (WR)
- 1971–1977: Florida (DB)
- 1978: Air Force (OC)
- 1979–1983: Air Force
- 1984–1989: Arkansas
- 1990–1993: Clemson
- 1994–2005: Rice

Head coaching record
- Overall: 168–140–4
- Bowls: 4–6

Accomplishments and honors

Championships
- As coach: 3 SWC (1988–1989, 1994); ACC (1991); As player: Southwest Conference 1961, 1964; National (1964)

Awards
- AFCA Coach of the Year (1983); Bobby Dodd Coach of the Year Award (1983); SWC Coach of the Year (1988); WAC Coach of the Year (1982); Amos Alonzo Stagg Award (2015); Second-team All-American (1964); First-team All-SWC (1964)

Kenneth Wahl Hatfield (born June 6, 1943) is an American former college football player and coach. He served as the head football coach at the United States Air Force Academy (1979–1983), the University of Arkansas (1984–1989), Clemson University (1990–1993), and Rice University (1994–2005), compiling a career head coaching record of 168–140–4.

== Playing career ==
Hatfield is a graduate of the University of Arkansas, where he starred at defensive back for the 1964 team that won a share of the national championship. His punt return for a touchdown helped Arkansas beat the #1 Texas Longhorns, 14–13, in the 1964 game in Austin. Hatfield was a first team All-American punt returner for the 1964 season. Among his teammates were future Dallas Cowboys head coach Jimmy Johnson and future Dallas Cowboys owner Jerry Jones. He is a member of the Sigma Chi fraternity.

== Coaching career ==
=== Air Force ===
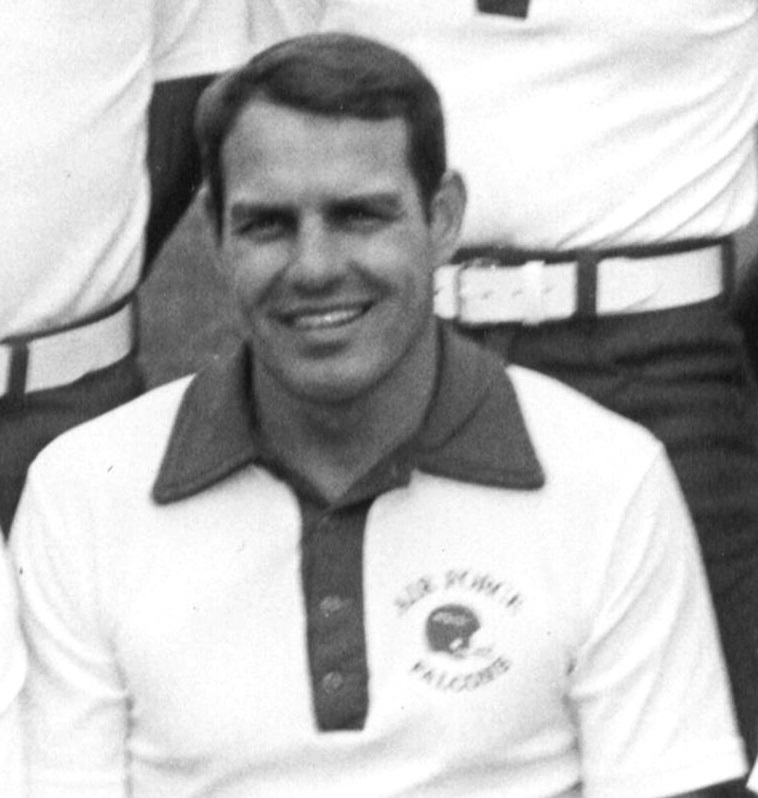
Hatfield with Air Force

Hatfield began his college head coaching career at the United States Air Force Academy from 1979 to 1983. He gradually rebuilt a program that had struggled through most of the 1970s and laid the foundation for its success in the 1980s and early 1990s under his offensive coordinator and successor, Fisher DeBerry. By his final year, the Falcons were ranked 13th in the country by the Coaches' Poll and 15th in the AP Poll—their first appearance in a final poll since 1970.

=== Arkansas ===
Hatfield then moved to his alma mater, Arkansas, where he compiled a 55–17–1 record from 1984 to 1989. His teams won two straight Southwest Conference titles in 1988 and 1989, a feat that the Razorbacks had not accomplished since his playing days. He was named the SWC Coach of the Year in 1988. On January 2, 1989, Hatfield became the second former player to coach his alma mater in the Cotton Bowl Classic, the first being Gene Stallings at Texas A&M beating Coach Bear Bryant & Alabama in 1967 season (1968 Cotton Bowl). Arkansas's Southwest Conference championship in 1989 is the program's last conference title to date.

Hatfield had a somewhat frosty relationship with longtime Arkansas athletic director Frank Broyles, even though Broyles had been his coach during his playing days. Broyles had a reputation for being very hands-on with the football program he had built into a national power as head coach from 1958 to 1976. As good as Hatfield's last two Razorback teams had been, he lost several recruits after 1987 when rival coaches claimed he was in Broyles' doghouse. When Broyles signed a new five-year contract in early 1990, Hatfield left for Clemson University without even visiting the campus. Later, when Hatfield was asked if Broyles had been a factor in his abrupt departure from Fayetteville, he replied, "His name is on the (athletics) building down there. Let that be my answer." Ironically, the coach Hatfield succeeded at Clemson, Danny Ford, would eventually become the Razorbacks' coach in 1993.

=== Clemson ===
Hatfield coached at Clemson from 1990 to 1993, compiling a 32–13–1 record. He did much to clean up the program's image in the aftermath of sanctions from the Ford era. In his second season, 1991, he led the Tigers to their last ACC title in the pre-championship game era. However, Hatfield was never really accepted by Clemson's fans. A common saying among Tiger fans during this time was "Howard built it. Ford filled it. Hatfield killed it."

Largely due to this discontent, school officials refused to grant him a one-year extension on his contract after the 1993 season, even though the Tigers had rebounded from 5–6 in 1992 (Clemson's first losing season in 16 years) to a solid 8–3 record that year and a Peach Bowl appearance. Angered at what he saw as a lack of support, Hatfield resigned at the end of the regular season.

=== Rice ===
Soon afterward, Hatfield was hired at Rice University, where he compiled a 55–78–1 record before resigning on November 30, 2005, following a 1–10 season. He only had three winning seasons in 12 years. Although the Owls were bowl-eligible in those three winning seasons, they weren't invited to a bowl in part because of the school's small alumni and fan base. Rice is the second-smallest school in Division I FBS and often had to play schools 10 times its size or more (and in some cases, with more freshmen than it has students), a major reason why he wasn't as successful as he had been at his previous stops. In his first year, despite a losing overall record, he managed to lead the Owls to a share of the Southwest Conference title and a victory over the rival Texas Longhorns on national TV.

A story in the November 1, 2002, issue of the Chronicle of Higher Education quoted Hatfield saying that he "would not necessarily kick a player off the team for being gay, he probably would think hard about it." In the article, he cited his religious beliefs as the motivation for his stance. Soon after the publication, the Rice University faculty unanimously voted to repudiate Hatfield's comments, and Hatfield apologized for his comments. He continued to coach the Owls until 2005.

=== Football coaching philosophy ===
One of the last few remaining proponents of the conservative triple-option offense in college football, Hatfield compiled a 168–140–4 record as a head coach.

On November 25, 2014, It was announced that Hatfield was chosen as the recipient of the 2015 Amos Alonzo Stagg Award.

== Head coaching record ==
Year	Team	Overall	Conference	Standing	Bowl/playoffs	Coaches^{#}	AP^{°}
Air Force Falcons (NCAA Division I-A independent) (1979)
1979	Air Force	2–9					
Air Force Falcons (Western Athletic Conference) (1980–1983)
1980	Air Force	2–9–1	1–6	T–8th			
1981	Air Force	4–7	2–5	7th			
1982	Air Force	8–5	4–3	T–3rd	W Hall of Fame Classic		
1983	Air Force	10–2	5–2	2nd	W Independence	15	13
Air Force:		26–32–1	12–16				
Arkansas Razorbacks (Southwest Conference) (1984–1989)
1984	Arkansas	7–4–1	5–3	T–3rd	L Liberty		
1985	Arkansas	10–2	6–2	T–2nd	W Holiday	12	12
1986	Arkansas	9–3	6–2	T–2nd	L Orange	16	15
1987	Arkansas	9–4	5–2	T–2nd	L Liberty		
1988	Arkansas	10–2	7–0	1st	L Cotton	13	12
1989	Arkansas	10–2	7–1	1st	L Cotton	13	13
Arkansas:		55–17–1	36–10				
Clemson Tigers (Atlantic Coast Conference) (1990–1993)
1990	Clemson	10–2	5–2	T–2nd	W Hall of Fame	9	9
1991	Clemson	9–2–1	6–0–1	1st	L Florida Citrus	17	18
1992	Clemson	5–6	3–5	7th			
1993	Clemson	8–3 (Note: Hatfield resigned after the regular season. Tommy West coached Clemson in the Peach Bowl. Clemson credits the 1993 regular season to Hatfield and the Peach Bowl to West.)	5–3	T–3rd	W Peach	23	24
Clemson:		32–13–1	19–10–1				
Rice Owls (Southwest Conference) (1994–1995)
1994	Rice	5–6	4–3	T–1st			
1995	Rice	2–8–1	1–6	7th			
Rice Owls (Western Athletic Conference) (1996–2004)
1996	Rice	7–4	6–2	T–2nd (Mountain)			
1997	Rice	7–4	5–3	T–2nd (Mountain)			
1998	Rice	5–6	5–3	T–3rd (Mountain)			
1999	Rice	5–6	4–3	4th			
2000	Rice	3–8	2–6	T–6th			
2001	Rice	8–4	5–3	T–4th			
2002	Rice	4–7	3–5	T–6th			
2003	Rice	5–7	5–3	T–4th			
2004	Rice	3–8	2–6	9th			
Rice Owls (Conference USA) (2005)
2005	Rice	1–10	1–7	T–5th (West)			
Rice:		55–78–1	43–50				
Total:		168–140–4					
National championship Conference title Conference division title or championship game berth
^{#}Rankings from final Coaches Poll.; ^{°}Rankings from final AP Poll.

== See also ==
- List of NCAA major college football yearly punt and kickoff return leaders
- List of presidents of the American Football Coaches Association
