= Arkansas Razorbacks football =

College football team of the University of Arkansas

2026 Arkansas Razorbacks football team
- First season: 1894; 132 years ago
- Athletic director: Hunter Yurachek
- General manager: Gaizka Crowley
- Head coach: Ryan Silverfield; 1st season, 4–6 (.400)
- Location: Fayetteville, Arkansas
- Stadium: Donald W. Reynolds Razorback Stadium (Note: Arkansas also plays one home game annually at War Memorial Stadium in Little Rock, Arkansas (capacity: 54,120).) (capacity: 76,212)
- Field: Frank Broyles Field
- NCAA division: Division I FBS
- Conference: SEC
- Colors: Cardinal and white
- All-time record: 719–536–37 (.571)
- Bowl record: 18–24–3 (.433)

National championships
- Claimed: 1964
- Unclaimed: 1977

Conference championships
- SWC: 1936, 1946, 1954, 1959, 1960, 1961, 1964, 1965, 1968, 1975, 1979, 1988, 1989

Division championships
- SEC West: 1995, 1998, 2002, 2006
- Consensus All-Americans: 25
- Rivalries: LSU (rivalry); Missouri (rivalry); Texas (rivalry); Texas A&M (rivalry); Ole Miss (rivalry); Texas Tech (rivalry)

Uniforms
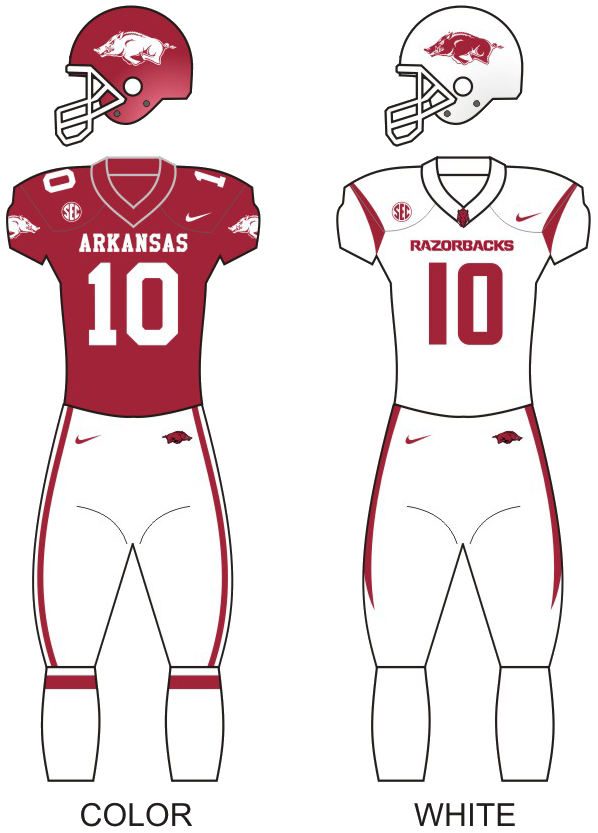
- Fight song: Arkansas Fight
- Marching band: Best in Sight and Sound
- Outfitter: Nike
- Website: arkansasrazorbacks.com

The Arkansas Razorbacks football program represents the University of Arkansas in the sport of American football. The Razorbacks compete in the Football Bowl Subdivision (FBS) of the National Collegiate Athletic Association (NCAA) as a member of the Southeastern Conference (SEC). Home games are played at stadiums on or near the two largest campuses of the University of Arkansas System: Donald W. Reynolds Razorback Stadium in Fayetteville and War Memorial Stadium in Little Rock.

The program began in 1894 and has compiled an all-time record of 740–539–40, for a .576 winning percentage. The Razorbacks have won 13 conference championships and have had 58 players honored as All-Americans. Arkansas claims one national championship (1964) awarded by the Football Writers Association of America (FWAA).

== Conference affiliations ==
Arkansas's football team has been a member of the Southeastern Conference since 1992.

Arkansas has been affiliated with the following conferences.

- Independent (1894–1914)
- Southwest Conference (1915–1991)
- Southeastern Conference (1992–present)

== Championships ==
=== National championships ===
Arkansas has been named national champion twice by NCAA-designated major selectors. Arkansas claims the 1964 championship but does not claim the co-national championship the program was awarded in 1977 by the Rothman (FACT) poll after the Razorbacks finished the season with an 11–1 record and defeated #2 Oklahoma in the Orange Bowl, 31–6.

In 1964, the Razorbacks finished the season as the only major team with an undefeated and untied record (11–0) after No. 1 Alabama lost to Texas in the Orange Bowl (and after Arkansas previously defeated Texas in Austin, TX that season). However, the AP and Coaches Polls became final before the bowl games were played, leaving one-loss Alabama as the AP and UPI national champion. The Football Writers Association of America (FWAA) and Helms Athletic Foundation (Helms) conducted their final polling after the bowl games and selected Arkansas as the national champion.

Year	Coach	Selectors	Record	Bowl	Opponent	Result	Final AP	Final Coaches
1964	Frank Broyles	Billingsley, Football Research, FWAA, Helms, National Championship Foundation, Poling System, Sagarin, Sagarin (ELO-Chess)	11–0	Cotton Bowl Classic	Nebraska	W 10–7	No. 2	No. 2

=== Conference championships ===
Arkansas has won 13 conference championships (six shared, seven outright), all during their tenure in the Southwest Conference.

Season	Conference	Coach	Overall record	Conference record
1936	SWC	Fred Thomsen	7–3	5–1
1946†	SWC	John Barnhill	6-3-2	5–1
1954	SWC	Bowden Wyatt	8–3	5–1
1959†	SWC	Frank Broyles	9–2	5–1
1960	SWC	Frank Broyles	8–3	6–1
1961†	SWC	Frank Broyles	8–3	6–1
1964	SWC	Frank Broyles	11–0	7–0
1965	SWC	Frank Broyles	10–1	7–0
1968†	SWC	Frank Broyles	10–1	6–1
1975†	SWC	Frank Broyles	10–2	6–1
1979†	SWC	Lou Holtz	10–2	7–1
1988	SWC	Ken Hatfield	10–2	7–0
1989	SWC	Ken Hatfield	10–2	7–1

† Co-champions

=== Division championships ===
Arkansas has won four division championships, all within the SEC Western Division. Arkansas has made three appearances in the SEC Championship Game as winner of the SEC Western Division but are 0–3 in those appearances. Arkansas was also the SEC Western Division co-champions in 1998 with Mississippi State but lost to the Bulldogs during the regular season, resulting in Mississippi State representing the West in the SEC Championship Game. In 2002, Alabama had the best conference record in the West with a 6–2 mark, but was on probation by the NCAA and was barred from post season play. Arkansas played in the SEC Championship Game due to winning the tiebreaker for a three-way tie with Auburn and LSU, both of whom Arkansas defeated during the regular season.

Season	Division	Opponent	SEC CG result
1995	SEC West	Florida	L 3–34
1998†	SEC West	N/A (Lost tiebreaker to Mississippi State)	
2002†	SEC West	Georgia	L 3–30
2006	SEC West	Florida	L 28–38

† - Co-champions

== Head coaches ==
There have been 36 head coaches of Arkansas. Barry Lunney Jr. became the interim head coach on November 11, 2019, after the firing of Chad Morris.

No.	Coach	Years	Seasons	Record	Pct.	Bowls
1	John Futrall	1894–1896	3	5–2	.714	—
2	B. N. Wilson	1897–1898	2	4–1–1	.750	—
3	Colbert Searles	1899–1900	2	5–2–2	.667	—
4	Charles Thomas	1901–1902	2	9–8	.529	—
5	D. A. McDaniel	1903	1	3–4	.429	—
6	A. D. Brown	1904–1905	2	6–9	.400	—
7	Frank Longman	1906–1907	2	5–8–3	.406	—
8	Hugo Bezdek	1908–1912	5	29–13–1	.686	—
9	E. T. Pickering	1913–1914	2	11–7	.611	—
10	T. T. McConnell	1915–1916	2	8–6–1	.567	—
11	Norman Paine	1917–1918	2	8–3–1	.708	—
12	J. B. Craig	1919	1	3–4	.429	—
13	George McLaren	1920–1921	2	8–5–3	.594	—
14	Francis Schmidt	1922–1928	7	42–20–3	.669	—
15	Fred Thomsen	1929–1941	13	56–61–10	.480	0–0–1
16	George Cole	1942	1	3–7	.300	—
17	John Tomlin	1943	1	2–7	.222	—
18	Glen Rose	1944–1945	2	8–12–1	.405	—
19	John Barnhill	1946–1949	4	22–17–3	.560	1–0–1
20	Otis Douglas	1950–1952	3	9–21	.300	—
21	Bowden Wyatt	1953–1954	2	11–10	.524	0–1
22	Jack Mitchell	1955–1957	3	17–12–1	.583	—
23	Frank Broyles	1958–1976	19	144–58–5	.708	4–6
24	Lou Holtz	1977–1983	7	60–21–2	.735	3–2–1
25	Ken Hatfield	1984–1989	6	55–17–1	.760	1–5
26	Jack Crowe	1990–1992	3	9–15	.375	0–1
27	Joe Kines †	1992	1	3–6–1	.350	—
28	Danny Ford	1993–1997	5	26–30–1	.465	0–1
29	Houston Nutt	1998–2007	10	75–46	.620	2–5
30	Reggie Herring †	2007	1	0–1	.000	0–1
31	Bobby Petrino	2008–2011	4	34–17	.667	2–1
32	John L. Smith †	2012	1	4–8	.333	—
33	Bret Bielema	2013–2017	5	29–34	.460	2–1
34	Paul Rhoads †	2017 (offseason)	1	—	—	—
35	Chad Morris	2018–2019	2	4–18	.182	—
36	Barry Lunney Jr. †	2019	1	0–2	.000	—
37	Sam Pittman	2020–2025	6	32–34	.485	3–0
38	Bobby Petrino†	2025	1	0–7	.000	—
39	Ryan Silverfield	2026—Present	—	—	—	—

† Interim head coach

== Bowl games ==
The Razorbacks have appeared in 45 bowl games with an overall record of 18–24–3.

No.	Season	Coach	Bowl	Opponent	Result
1	1933	Fred Thomsen	Dixie Classic	Centenary	T 7–7
2	1946	John Barnhill	Cotton Bowl Classic	LSU	T 0–0
3	1947	John Barnhill	Dixie Bowl	William & Mary	W 21–19
4	1954	Bowden Wyatt	Cotton Bowl Classic	Georgia Tech	L 6–14
5	1959	Frank Broyles	Gator Bowl	Georgia Tech	W 14–7
6	1960	Frank Broyles	Cotton Bowl Classic	Duke	L 6–7
7	1961	Frank Broyles	Sugar Bowl	Alabama	L 3–10
8	1962	Frank Broyles	Sugar Bowl	Ole Miss	L 13–17
9	1964	Frank Broyles	Cotton Bowl Classic	Nebraska	W 10–7
10	1965	Frank Broyles	Cotton Bowl Classic	LSU	L 7–14
11	1968	Frank Broyles	Sugar Bowl	Georgia	W 16–2
12	1969	Frank Broyles	Sugar Bowl	Ole Miss	L 22–27
13	1971	Frank Broyles	Liberty Bowl	Tennessee	L 13–14
14	1975	Frank Broyles	Cotton Bowl Classic	Georgia	W 31–10
15	1977	Lou Holtz	Orange Bowl	Oklahoma	W 31–6
16	1978	Lou Holtz	Fiesta Bowl	UCLA	T 10–10
17	1979	Lou Holtz	Sugar Bowl	Alabama	L 9–24
18	1980	Lou Holtz	Hall of Fame Classic	Tulane	W 34–15
19	1981	Lou Holtz	Gator Bowl	North Carolina	L 27–31
20	1982	Lou Holtz	Astro-Bluebonnet Bowl	Florida	W 28–24
21	1984	Ken Hatfield	Liberty Bowl	Auburn	L 15–21
22	1985	Ken Hatfield	Holiday Bowl	Arizona State	W 18–17
23	1986	Ken Hatfield	Orange Bowl	Oklahoma	L 8–42
24	1987	Ken Hatfield	Liberty Bowl	Georgia	L 17–20
25	1988	Ken Hatfield	Cotton Bowl Classic	UCLA	L 3–17
26	1989	Ken Hatfield	Cotton Bowl Classic	Tennessee	L 27–31
27	1991	Jack Crowe	Independence	Georgia	L 15–24
28	1995	Danny Ford	Carquest Bowl	North Carolina	L 10–20
29	1998	Houston Nutt	Florida Citrus Bowl	Michigan	L 31–45
30	1999	Houston Nutt	Cotton Bowl Classic	Texas	W 27–6
31	2000	Houston Nutt	Las Vegas Bowl	UNLV	L 14–31
32	2001	Houston Nutt	Cotton Bowl Classic	Oklahoma	L 3–10
33	2002	Houston Nutt	Music City Bowl	Minnesota	L 14–29
34	2003	Houston Nutt	Independence Bowl	Missouri	W 27–14
35	2006	Houston Nutt	Capital One Bowl	Wisconsin	L 14–17
36	2007	Reggie Herring (interim)	Cotton Bowl Classic	Missouri	L 7–38
37	2009	Bobby Petrino	Liberty Bowl	East Carolina	W 20–17
38	2010	Bobby Petrino	Sugar Bowl	Ohio State	L 26–31
39	2011	Bobby Petrino	Cotton Bowl Classic	Kansas State	W 29–16
40	2014	Bret Bielema	Texas Bowl	Texas	W 31–7
41	2015	Bret Bielema	Liberty Bowl	Kansas State	W 45–23
42	2016	Bret Bielema	Belk Bowl	Virginia Tech	L 24–35
43	2021	Sam Pittman	Outback Bowl	Penn State	W 24–10
44	2022	Sam Pittman	Liberty Bowl	Kansas	W 55–53 3OT
45	2024	Sam Pittman	Liberty Bowl	Texas Tech	W 39–26

Arkansas has been invited to multiple Cotton Bowl Classics (12 games, 4–7–1 record), Sugar Bowls (6 games, 1–5 record), and Liberty Bowls (7 games, 4–3 record). Arkansas has faced current or future fellow SEC members in multiple bowl games as follows: Georgia (4 times); Oklahoma (3 times); and Alabama, LSU, Ole Miss, Missouri, Tennessee, Texas (2 times each). Arkansas has faced current or future out of conference opponents Georgia Tech, Kansas State, North Carolina, and UCLA in two bowl games each.

== Rivalries ==
=== LSU ===
Since joining the Southeastern Conference in 1992, the Razorbacks have developed a rivalry with the LSU Tigers. The game was played annually the day after Thanksgiving and was televised on CBS until 2014 when LSU played Texas A&M on Thanksgiving and Arkansas played Missouri that week. The winner of the game has taken home the "Golden Boot", which is a 24-karat gold trophy in the shape of the two states, since its creation in 1996.

In 2002, the rivalry gained some momentum as the game winner would represent the Western Division in the SEC Championship Game. The game (called "Miracle on Markham") was won by Arkansas on a touchdown pass in the final seconds by Matt Jones. In 2006, the Tigers snapped the SEC West champion Razorbacks' 10-game winning streak when they beat Arkansas in Little Rock, 31–26. In 2007, Arkansas stunned top-ranked LSU in triple overtime, 50–48, giving them their first win in Baton Rouge since 1993, and their first victory over a top-ranked team since beating Texas in 1981, winning back the Golden Boot trophy (after 4 consecutive seasons in the hands of LSU) in the process. In 2008, the Razorbacks defended the trophy, winning 31–30 on a last minute touchdown drive. As of 2025, LSU leads the series 44–23–2. Beginning in 2026, the rivalry game will again be played on Thanksgiving weekend.

=== Missouri ===
Arkansas and Missouri first met in 1906 in Columbia, Missouri, and played each other a total of five times prior to Missouri joining the SEC in 2012, and then becoming Arkansas' permanent cross-division rival in 2014. The annual meeting was dubbed the Battle Line Rivalry by the SEC, although most Arkansas fans do not consider the game a true rivalry. On November 23, 2015, a new rivalry trophy was unveiled for the annual game. Missouri leads the series 12–4 as of the conclusion of the 2025 season (Missouri vacated its win in 2016 due to NCAA action). Beginning in the 2026 season, the game will no longer be played on Thanksgiving weekend.

=== Ole Miss ===
The Razorbacks first played the Rebels in 1908. In addition to several occasional years of playing each other, the two teams played each other from 1940 to 1947 and 1952–62 on an annual basis. The Razorbacks and Rebels also met twice in the Sugar Bowl, played in New Orleans, in 1963 and 1970 (both won by Ole Miss). Since 1981, the two teams have played each other annually in football. In 2001, Arkansas and Ole Miss played a then-NCAA record seven-overtime game in Oxford, Mississippi; Arkansas won by a final score of 58–56. When Houston Nutt resigned in 2007 after ten years as Arkansas' head coach to take the same job at Ole Miss, it only added to and heightened the long-standing rivalry between the schools. Nutt was at Ole Miss for four years and went 2–2 versus Arkansas. Arkansas had played Ole Miss more total times than any other SEC opponent until Texas A&M joined the conference in 2012. Arkansas leads the series, 37–29–1, per its records and the official NCAA records, but only leads 36–30–1 per Ole Miss.

=== Texas ===
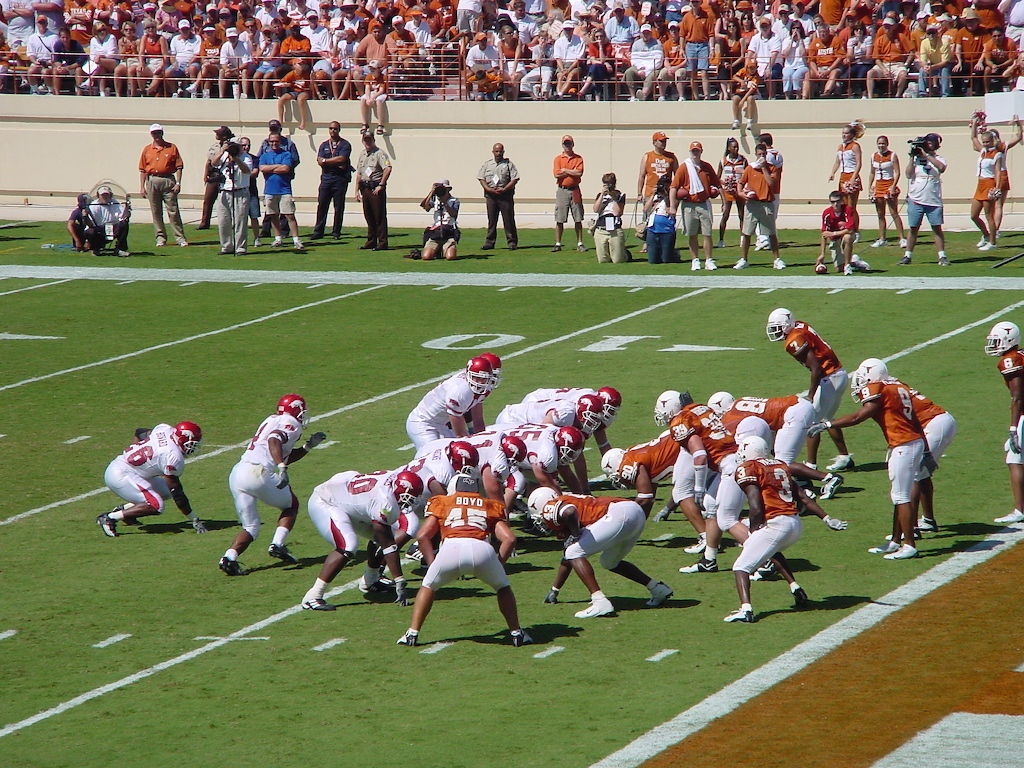
2003 Arkansas game at Texas. Arkansas won 38–28.

The Arkansas-Texas game has not been regularly played since Arkansas's departure from the Southwest Conference in 1991, and this has dulled the intensity of the rivalry. There were many classic games, including the result of the 1969 Game of the Century (also known as "The Big Shootout"), which eventually led to the Longhorns' 1969 national championship. One of Arkansas' biggest victories over Texas came in 1981, when the Razorbacks defeated the No. 1 ranked Longhorns in Fayetteville, 42–11. Arkansas and Texas have played only six times since 1991, with the Razorbacks winning the 2000 Cotton Bowl, a 2003 game in Austin, and the 2014 Texas Bowl. The Longhorns won the 2004 meeting in Fayetteville and a game in Austin in 2008. However, these games have not served to reignite the once intense rivalry between the two schools. The teams played again in Fayetteville in 2021 (a return game for the 2008 contest in Austin), where the game ended with the Arkansas Razorbacks winning by a score of 40–21; this victory put them in the AP Poll for the first time in 5 years. As of the end of the 2025 season, Texas leads the series 58–23. In the 2024 season, Texas and Oklahoma became members of the SEC. Beginning in 2026, each member of the SEC will play 9 conference games, with 3 permanent conference opponents. Arkansas' permanent SEC opponents will be Texas, LSU, and Missouri. Many Razorback fans are hopeful that an annual game versus the Longhorns will rekindle the rivalry between the Hogs and the Horns.

=== Texas A&M ===
The Razorbacks first played the Texas A&M Aggies in 1903. From 1934 to 1991, the two had played annually as Southwest Conference members. However, the series ceased in 1991 when Arkansas left the SWC to join the Southeastern Conference. Two of the biggest victories for Arkansas over A&M came in 1975 and 1986. Arkansas manhandled undefeated #2 Texas A&M 31–6 in Little Rock in 1975 to win a share of that year's SWC championship and earn the right to play in the 1976 Cotton Bowl Classic. In 1986, Arkansas again beat Texas A&M in Little Rock, this time 14–10, handing the #7 Aggies their only conference loss of the season.

The series resumed in 2009 played at AT&T Stadium in Arlington, TX, a neutral field, with Arkansas winning 47–19. The initial agreement between the two schools allowed the game to be played for at least 10 years, followed by 5 consecutive, 4-year rollover options, allowing the game to be played for a total of 30 consecutive seasons. Following A&M's move to the SEC, the 2012 game was played at Kyle Field, and the 2013 game was played at Arkansas, and thereafter resumed at AT&T Stadium in Arlington, Texas. Beginning in the 2025 season, the series will move back to each team's home-field stadiums.

Arkansas' 20–10 victory during the 2021 season broke a 9-game A&M win streak against Arkansas. The Aggies won the 2022 matchup 23–21. As of the end of the 2025 season, the Razorbacks lead the all-time series 42–37–3.

== All-time records against SEC teams ==
Records as of December 28, 2023

Opponent	Record	Pct.
Alabama	7–27	.206
Auburn	13–20–1	.379
Florida	3–10	.231
Georgia	4–12	.250
Kentucky	3–5	.375
LSU	23–44–2	.358
Mississippi State	19–15–1	.544
Missouri	4–12	.267
Oklahoma	4–10-1	.300
Ole Miss	37–33–1	.536
South Carolina	14–10	.583
Tennessee	7–13	.316
Texas	23–57–0	.291
Texas A&M	42–35–3	.551
Vanderbilt	7–3	.700

== Awards and honors ==
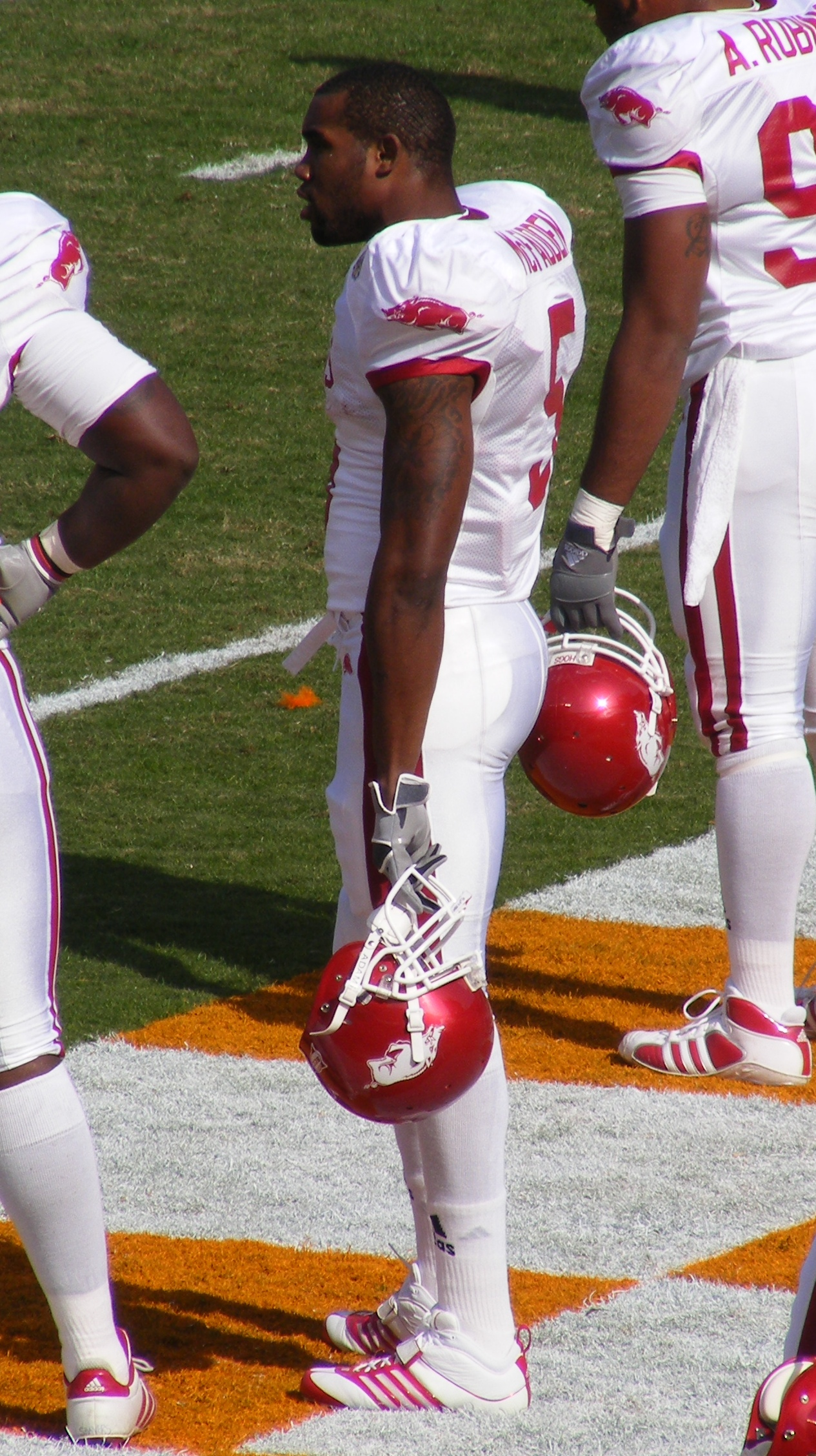
McFadden before the 2007 game at Tennessee.

=== Player awards ===
Outland Trophy Best interior lineman
1954	William "Bud" Brooks – G
1966	Loyd Phillips – DT
Doak Walker Award Best running back
2006	Darren McFadden
2007	Darren McFadden

Walter Camp Award College football player of the year
2007	Darren McFadden – HB
Rimington Trophy Best center
2007	Jonathan Luigs
Jet Award Best return specialist
2011	Joe Adams

John Mackey Award Most outstanding tight end
2010	D.J. Williams
2015	Hunter Henry
Burlsworth Trophy Most outstanding player who began his career as a walk-on
2021	Grant Morgan – LB

=== Coaching awards ===
AFCA Coach of the Year Award
1964	Frank Broyles
Sporting News College Football Coach of the Year
1964	Frank Broyles
1977	Lou Holtz
Southwest Conference Coach of the Year
1964	Frank Broyles
1988	Ken Hatfield

Walter Camp Coach of the Year Award
1977	Lou Holtz
Eddie Robinson Coach of the Year Award
1977	Lou Holtz
Football News Division I-A National Coach of the Year
1998	Houston Nutt
Southeastern Conference Coach of the Year
2001	Houston Nutt
2006	Houston Nutt

=== All-Americans ===
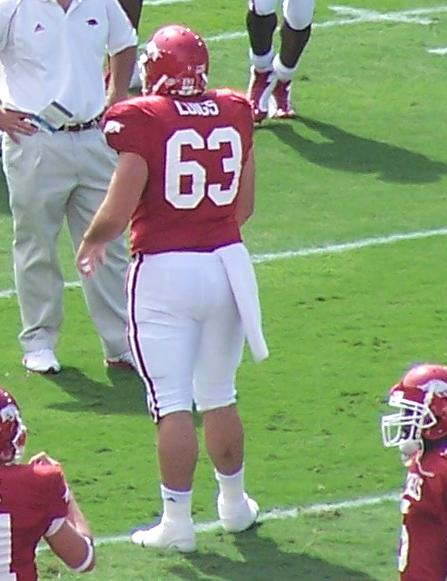
Luigs before the 2006 game against Alabama.

Every year, players are selected by several publications to be placed on their All-American team for that season. The NCAA officially recognizes five All-American lists which include AP (Associated Press), American Football Coaches Association (AFCA), Football Writers Association of America (FWAA), Sporting News (TSN), and the Walter Camp Football Foundation (WCFF). A consensus All-American is determined using a point system; three points if the player was selected for the first team, two points for the second team, and one point for the third team. Arkansas has had 58 All-Americans (21 consensus) in its history.

Name	Position	Years at Arkansas	AFCA	AP	FWAA	TSN	WCFF
Joe Adams	PR			2011	2011	2011	2011
Lance Alworth	B	1959–1961			1961		
Shawn Andrews†	OT	2001–2003	2002; 2003	2003	2002; 2003	2002; 2003	2003
Jim Barnes†	OG	1966–1968		1968			
Jim Benton	E	1935–1937		1937			
Martine Bercher	S	1962–1966			1966		
Rodney Brand†	C			1969	1969		1969
Bud Brooks†	OG/DT		1954	1954	1954		1954
Dick Bumpas†	DT	1968–1970		1970			
Brandon Burlsworth	OG	1995–1998		1998			
Ronnie Caveness	LB		1964	1964	1964	1964	
Tony Cherico	NG	1984–1987	1987				
Bobby Crockett	E				1965		
Chuck Dicus†	WR	1968–1970	1969; 1970	1970			1970
Ron Faurot	DE	1980–1983					
Robert Felton	OG	2003–2007		2007			
Cobi Hamilton	WR			2012			
Ken Hamlin	FS	1999–2002					
Dan Hampton	DT	1975–1978	1978				
Leotis Harris†	OG	1974–1977	1977	1977			1977
Wayne Harris	LB	1958–1960			1960		
Hunter Henry†	TE	2013–2015	2015	2015	2015	2015	2015
Glen Ray Hines†	T		1965	1965	1965		1965
Greg Horne	P	1983–1986	1986				
Bruce James	DE	1968–1970			1970		
Felix Jones	TB/KR	2005–2007	2007				2007
Kenoy Kennedy	FS	1996–1999		1999			
Greg Kolenda†	OT	1976–1979	1979	1979	1979		1979
Steve Korte†	OG		1982	1982	1982	1982	
Bruce Lahay	K/P				1981		
Steve Little†	K/P	1974–1977	1976	1977	1977	1977	
Anthony Lucas	SE	1996–1999		1999			
Jonathan Luigs†	C	2004–2008		2006; 2007	2007	2007	2007
Jim Mabry†	OT	1986–1989	1989	1989			1989
Wayne Martin†	DT	1985–1988		1988	1988	1988	
Bill McClard	K	1969–1971	1970		1971	1971	
Darren McFadden†	RB	2005–2007	2006; 2007	2006; 2007	2007	2007	2007
Billy Moore	QB				1962		
Jim Mooty	B			1959			
Stephen Parker	OG	2003–2006				2006	
Jermaine Petty†	LB	1998–2001	2001				
Loyd Phillips†	T		1965; 1966	1965; 1966	1966	1966	1965: 1966
Cliff Powell	LB	1967–1969	1969				
Wear Schoonover	E	1927–1929		1929			
Clyde Scott†	TB	1944–1948	1948	1948			
Billy Ray Smith, Jr.†	DE	1979–1982	1981; 1982	1981; 1982	1981; 1982	1981; 1982	1981; 1982
Travis Swanson	C					2013	
Kendall Trainor†	K	1985–1988	1988	1988		1988	1988
Tony Ugoh	OG	2002–2006		2006			
Jimmy Walker	DT	1975–1978			1978		
D.J. Williams	TE			2010			

† Consensus All-American

=== Retired numbers ===
Arkansas Razorbacks retired numbers
No.	Player	Pos.	Tenure	Year retired	Ref.
12	Clyde Scott	QB	1946–1949	1949	
77	Brandon Burlsworth	G	1994–1998	1999	

== Facilities ==
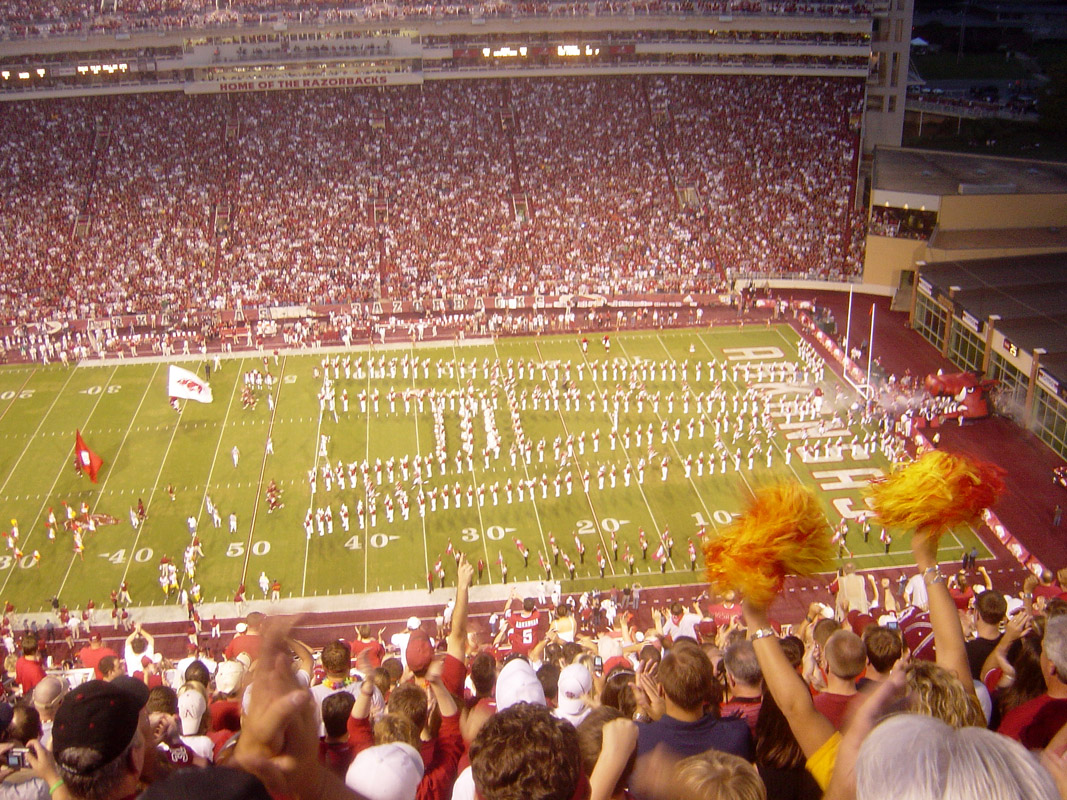
Razorback Stadium on game day

=== Donald W. Reynolds Razorback Stadium ===
Donald W. Reynolds Razorback Stadium (formerly Razorback Stadium) is the on-campus and primary home stadium for the Razorbacks located in Fayetteville, Arkansas. The Razorbacks began playing football at Razorback Stadium in 1938, where they beat Oklahoma A&M 27–7. The stadium was dedicated to Donald W. Reynolds for the $20 million donation from the Donald W. Reynolds Foundation to help finance the major expansion in 2001, which raised the seating capacity from 51,000 to 76,000. The current seating capacity is 76,212 after the north end of the stadium was mostly enclosed before the 2018 season. The playing field was dedicated to former head coach and athletic director Frank Broyles in 2007 and is now called the Frank Broyles Field at Donald W. Reynolds Razorback Stadium. Beginning July 1, 2027 the stadium will be called the CommunityAmerica Razorback Stadium.

=== War Memorial Stadium ===
War Memorial Stadium (WMS) is the secondary home stadium for the Razorbacks. War Memorial Stadium is located in Little Rock, Arkansas, with a seating capacity of 53,727. War Memorial Stadium used to host either two or three Razorback football games per season, sometimes as many as four, since WMS had more seats than Razorback Stadium prior to the expansion of Razorback Stadium in 2002. Beginning in 2014, Arkansas played only play one home game per season in Little Rock, and none of those were SEC games. The Razorbacks completed their latest contract with WMS in 2024, and the school has no plans to play any home games at that location in the near future.

=== Willard and Pat Walker Pavilion ===
The Willard and Pat Walker Pavilion was built in 1998 and is the indoor practice facility for the Arkansas Razorbacks.

== Hall of Fame ==
=== College Football Hall of Fame ===
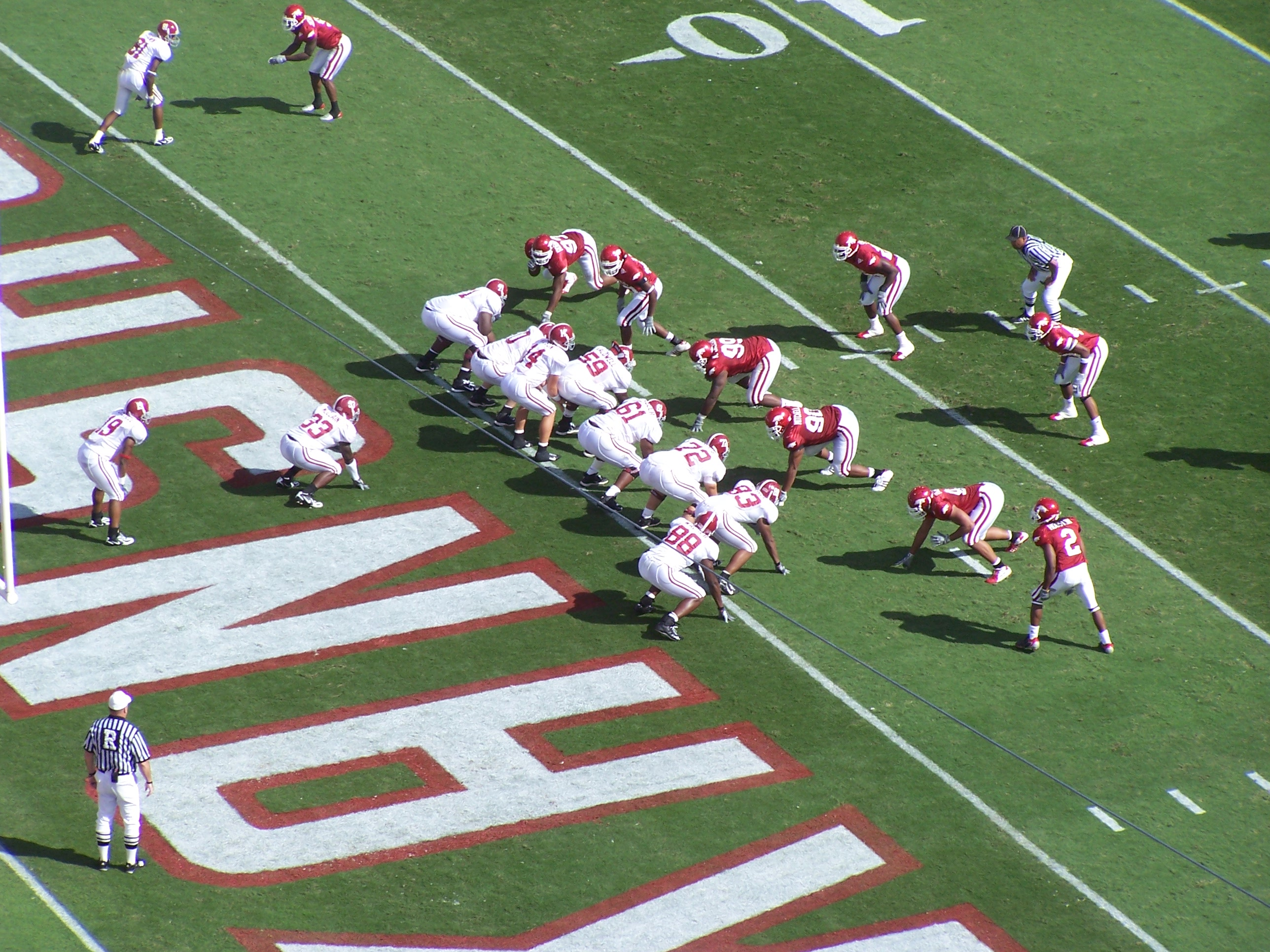
2006 Alabama vs. Arkansas game in Fayetteville.

Arkansas has 15 inductees to the College Football Hall of Fame with ties to the school.

Inducted	Name	Position	Years at Arkansas	Notes
1954	Hugo Bezdek	Coach	1908–1912	
1967	Wear Schoonover	End	1927–1929	
1971	Clyde Scott	HB	1944–1948	
1971	Francis Schmidt	Coach	1922–1928	
1984	Lance Alworth	Back	1959–1961	
1983	Frank Broyles	Coach	1958–1976	
1992	Loyd Phillips	T	1964–1966	
1997	Bowden Wyatt	Coach	1953–1954	
1999	Chuck Dicus	WR	1968–1970	
2000	Billy Ray Smith, Jr.	DE	1979–1982	
2004	Wayne Harris	LB	1958–1960	
2008	Lou Holtz	Coach	1977–1983	
2010	Ronnie Caveness	LB	1962–1964	
2019	Darren McFadden	RB	2005–2007	
2024	Dan Hampton	DT	1975–1978	

=== Pro Football Hall of Fame ===
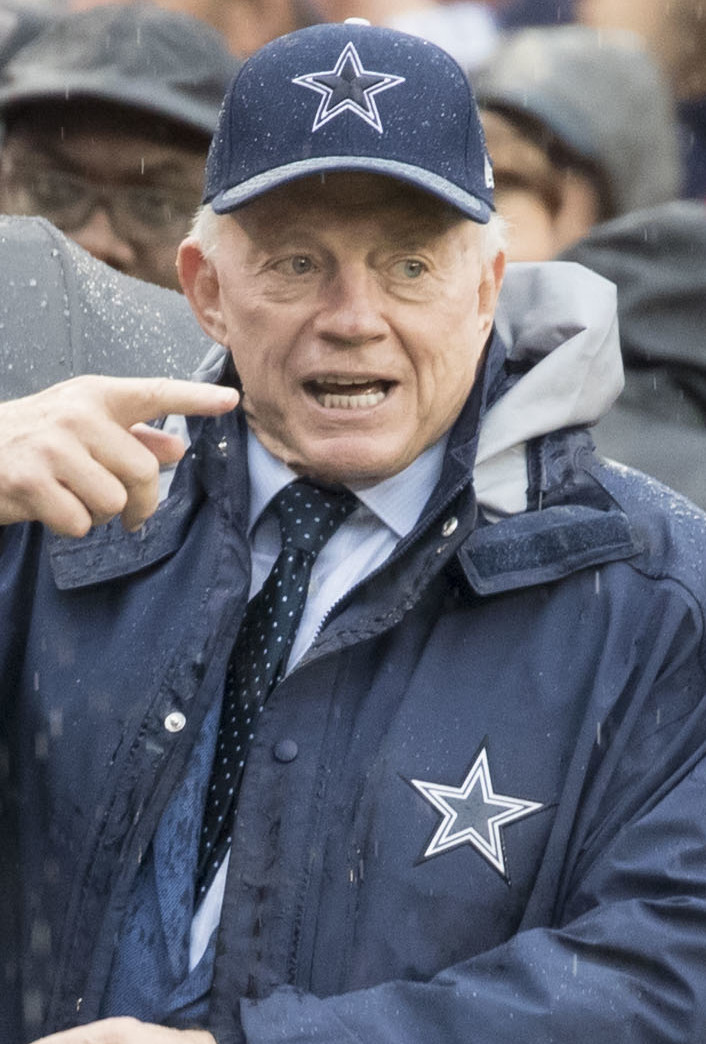
Dallas Cowboys owner Jerry Jones was a member of Arkansas' 1964 championship team

Arkansas has five inductees to the Pro Football Hall of Fame as of 2020.

Inducted	Name	Position	Years	Ref.
1978	Lance Alworth	WR	1959–1961	
2002	Dan Hampton	DL	1975–1978	
2017	Jerry Jones	Team owner/Dallas Cowboys	1961–1964	
2020	Jimmy Johnson	Coach	1961–1964	
2020	Steve Atwater	S	1985–1988	

== Future opponents ==
=== Conference opponents ===
From 1992 to 2023, Arkansas played in the West Division of the SEC and played each opponent in the division each year along with several teams from the East Division. The SEC will expand the conference to 16 teams and will eliminate its two divisions in 2024, causing a new scheduling format for the Razorbacks to play against the other members of the conference. Only the 2024 conference schedule was announced on June 14, 2023, while the conference still considers a new format for the future.

Arkansas' yearly SEC opponents from 2026 to 2029 are LSU, Missouri and Texas. The Razorbacks will play one group of six conference opponents in 2026 and 2028, and the other six in 2027 and 2029.

==== 2026 Conference Schedule ====
Opponent	Site	Result
No. 2 Arkansas	Donald W. Reynolds Razorback Stadium; Fayetteville, AR	L 17–45
at Texas A&M	Kyle Field; College Station, TX (rivalry)	L 7–34
No. 15Tennessee	Donald W. Reynolds Razorback Stadium; Fayetteville, AR	L 17–24
at Vanderbilt	FirstBank Stadium; Nashville, TN	
Missouri	Donald W. Reynolds Razorback Stadium; Fayetteville, AR (Battle Line Rivalry)	
at Auburn	Jordan–Hare Stadium; Auburn, AL	
South Carolina	Donald W. Reynolds Razorback Stadium; Fayetteville, AR	
at Texas	Darrell K Royal–Texas Memorial Stadium; Austin, TX (rivalry)	
LSU	Donald W. Reynolds Razorback Stadium; Fayetteville, AR (rivalry)	

=== Non-conference opponents ===
Announced non-conference schedules as of September 30, 2026.

2027	2028	2029	2030	2031	2032	2033	2034
Gardner–Webb	Memphis	West Florida	vs Texas Tech^{1}	Texas Tech	at Oklahoma State	Oklahoma State	at Texas Tech
at Tulsa	at Notre Dame	Tulsa	Memphis				
Oklahoma State		Utah					

1. Vegas Kickoff Classic, Las Vegas, Nevada
