= 1964 All-Southwest Conference football team =

The 1964 All-Southwest Conference football team consists of American football players chosen by various organizations for All-Southwest Conference teams for the 1964 NCAA University Division football season. The selectors for the 1964 season included the Associated Press (AP) and the United Press International (UPI). Players selected as first-team players by both the AP and UPI are designated in bold.

The Arkansas Razorbacks won the SWC championship, and finished the season undefeated, 11-0, and claimed a share of the 1964 national championship. Arkansas head coach Frank Broyles was the SWC coach of the year.

== All Southwest selections ==
=== Backs ===
- **Fred Marshall**, Arkansas (AP-1 [QB]; UPI-1)
- **Donny Anderson**, Texas Tech (AP-1 [HB]; UPI-1)
- **Harold Philipp**, Texas (AP-1 [FB]; UPI-1)
- Jim Fauver, TCU (UPI-1)
- Ken Hatfield, Arkansas (AP-1 [defensive halfback]; UPI-2)
- Joe Dixon, Texas (AP-1 [defensive halfback])
- Mike Pitman, Texas A&M (AP-1 [defensive halfback])
- Terry Southall, Baylor (UPI-2)
- Ernie Koy Jr., Texas (UPI-2)
- Jim Lindsey, Arkansas (UPI-2)
- Marvin Kristynik, Texas (UPI-3)
- Gene Fleming, Rice (UPI-3)
- Jim Taylor, SMU (UPI-3)
- Tom Davies, Baylor (UPI-3)

=== Ends ===
- **Larry Elkins**, Baylor (AP-1 [offensive end]; UPI-1)
- **Jerry Lamb**, Arkansas (AP-1 [offensive end]; UPI-1)
- Knox Nunnally, Texas (AP-1 [defensive end]; UPI-2)
- Dan Mauldin, Texas (AP-1 [defensive end])
- John Brotherton, Texas A&M (UPI-2)
- Sonny Campbell, TCU (UPI-3)
- Pete Lammons, Texas (UPI-3)

=== Tackles ===
- **Glen Ray Hines**, Arkansas (AP-1 [offensive tackle]; UPI-1)
- Ray Hinze, Texas A&M (UPI-1)
- Clayton Lacy, Texas (AP-1 [offensive tackle]; UPI-3)
- Loyd Phillips, Arkansas (AP-1 [defensive tackle]; UPI-2)
- Jim Williams, Arkansas (AP-1 [defensive tackle]; UPI-2)
- Frank Bedrick, Texas (UPI-3)

=== Guards ===
- **Tommy Nobis**, Texas (AP-1 [offensive guard and linebacker]; UPI-1)
- **Ronnie Caveness**, Arkansas (AP-1 [linebacker]; UPI-1)
- Steve Garmon, TCU (AP-1 [offensive guard]; UPI-2)
- John LaGrone, SMU (AP-1 [defensive guard]; UPI-2)
- Jimmy Johnson, Arkansas (AP-1 [defensive guard]; UPI-3)
- Arturo Delgado, Baylor (UPI-3)

=== Centers ===
- **Malcolm Walker**, Rice (UPI-1)
- Olen Underwood, Texas (AP-1; UPI-3)
- C. C. Willis, Texas Tech (UPI-2)

== Key ==
AP = Associated Press

UPI = United Press International

Bold = Consensus first-team selection of both the AP and UP

== See also ==
- 1964 College Football All-America Team
