= 1966 All-AFL Team =

List of the best American Football League players of 1966

The 1966 American Football League All-League Team was selected after the 1966 American Football League season by AFL players, the Associated Press (AP), the Newspaper Enterprise Association (NEA), the New York Daily News (NYDN), and United Press International (UPI) to honor the league's top performers at each position.

== Teams ==
Offense
Position	First team	Second team
Quarterback	Len Dawson, Chiefs (AFL, AP, NEA, NYDN, UPI)	Jack Kemp, Bills (AFL, AP, NYDN); George Blanda, Oilers (AFL); Joe Namath, Jets (NEA); John Hadl, Chargers (UPI)
Halfback	Clem Daniels, Raiders (AFL, AP, NEA, UPI); Bobby Burnett, Bills (NYDN)	Bobby Burnett, Bills (AFL, AP, NEA, UPI); Mike Garrett, Chiefs (NYDN)
Fullback	Jim Nance, Patriots (AFL, AP, NEA, NYDN, UPI)	Wray Carlton, Bills (AFL, AP, NEA, NYDN, UPI)
Wide receiver	Lance Alworth, Chargers (AFL, AP, NEA, NYDN, UPI); Otis Taylor, Chiefs (AP, NEA, UPI); Art Powell, Raiders (AFL, NYDN); Bob Scarpitto, Broncos (AFL)	George Sauer Jr., Jets (AFL, AP, NEA, NYDN); Art Powell, Raiders (AP, NEA, UPI); Otis Taylor, Chiefs (AFL, NYDN)
Tight end	Fred Arbanas, Chiefs (AFL, AP, NEA, NYDN, UPI)	Al Denson, Broncos (AFL, AP, NEA, NYDN, UPI)
Tackle	Jim Tyrer, Chiefs (AFL, AP, NEA, NYDN, UPI); Ron Mix, Chargers (AP, NEA, NYDN, UPI); Sherman Plunkett, Jets (AFL)	Stew Barber, Bills (AFL, AP, NYDN); Dick Hudson, Bills (AP, NEA, UPI); Walter Suggs, Oilers (NEA, UPI); Ron Mix, Chargers (AFL); Sherman Plunkett, Jets (NYDN)
Guard	Billy Shaw, Bills (AFL, AP, NEA, NYDN, UPI); Wayne Hawkins, Raiders (NEA, NYDN, UPI); Bob Talamini, Oilers (AFL); Ed Budde, Chiefs (AP)	Ed Budde, Chiefs (AFL, NEA, NYDN); Bob Talamini, Oilers (NEA, NYDN, UPI); Wayne Hawkins, Raiders (AFL, AP); Sam DeLuca, Jets (AP, UPI)
Center	Jim Otto, Raiders (AFL, NEA, NYDN, UPI); Jon Morris, Patriots (AP)	Jon Morris, Patriots (AFL, NEA, NYDN, UPI); Jim Otto, Raiders (AP)

Special teams
Position	First team	Second team
Kicker	Gino Cappelletti, Patriots (AFL)	Gino Cappelletti, Patriots (UPI)
Punter	N/A	Jerrel Wilson, Chiefs (AFL)

Defense
Position	First team	Second team
Defensive end	Jerry Mays, Chiefs (AFL, AP, NEA, NYDN, UPI); Ron McDole, Bills (AP, NYDN); Verlon Biggs, Jets (NEA, UPI); Larry Eisenhauer, Patriots (AFL)	Verlon Biggs, Jets (AFL, AP, NYDN); Larry Eisenhauer, Patriots (NEA, UPI); Ron McDole, Bills (NEA, UPI); Tom Day, Bills (AFL); Ike Lassiter, Raiders (AP); Ben Davidson, Raiders (NYDN)
Defensive tackle	Houston Antwine, Patriots (AFL, NEA, NYDN, UPI); Buck Buchanan, Chiefs (AFL, AP, UPI); Tom Sestak, Bills (NEA, NYDN); Jim Dunaway, Bills (AP); Tom Keating, Raiders (NEA)	Tom Keating, Raiders (AFL, AP, UPI); Buck Buchanan, Chiefs (NEA, NYDN); Jim Dunaway, Bills (NYDN, UPI); Tom Sestak, Bills (AFL); Houston Antwine, Patriots (AP); Jim Lee Hunt, Patriots (NEA)
Middle linebacker	Nick Buoniconti, Boston (AFL, AP, NEA, NYDN, UPI)	Sherrill Headrick, Chiefs (AP, NEA, NYDN); Harry Jacobs, Bills (AFL, UPI)
Outside linebacker	Bobby Bell, Chiefs (AFL, AP, NEA, NYDN, UPI); Mike Stratton, Bills (AFL, AP, NEA, NYDN, UPI)	E. J. Holub, Chiefs (AFL, AP, NYDN, UPI); John Bramlett, Broncos (AP, NEA, UPI); Frank Buncom, Chargers (AFL); Johnny Baker, Oilers (NEA); Larry Grantham, Jets (NYDN)
Cornerback	Butch Byrd, Bills (AFL, AP, NEA, NYDN, UPI); Dave Grayson, Raiders (AFL, NEA, NYDN); Kent McCloughan, Raiders (AP, UPI)	Speedy Duncan, Chargers (AFL, AP, NYDN, UPI); Kent McCloughan, Raiders (AFL, NEA); Dave Grayson, Raiders (AP, UPI); Willie Brown, Broncos (NEA); Johnny Sample, Jets (NYDN)
Safety	Johnny Robinson, Chiefs (AFL, AP, NEA, NYDN, UPI); Kenny Graham, Chargers (AP, NEA, UPI); George Saimes, Bills (AFL, NYDN)	Bobby Hunt, Chiefs (AFL, AP, NEA); Kenny Graham, Chargers (AFL, NYDN); Hagood Clarke, Bills (AP, NYDN); George Saimes, Bills (NEA, UPI); Willie West, Dolphins (UPI)
