= Super Bowl I =

1967 National Football League championship game

| Kansas City Chiefs (AFL) (11–2–1) | Green Bay Packers (NFL) (12–2) |
|---|---|
| 10 | 35 |
| Head coach: Hank Stram | Head coach: Vince Lombardi |
| | 1 | 2 | 3 | 4 | Total |
|---|---|---|---|---|---|
| KC | 0 | 10 | 0 | 0 | 10 |
| GB | 7 | 7 | 14 | 7 | 35 |
- Date: January 15, 1967
- Kickoff time: 1:15 p.m. PST (UTC-8)
- Stadium: Los Angeles Memorial Coliseum; Los Angeles, California
- MVP: Bart Starr, quarterback
- Favorite: Packers by 14
- Referee: Norm Schachter
- Attendance: 61,946

Ceremonies
- National anthem: Marching bands from the University of Arizona and Grambling College
- Coin toss: Norm Schachter
- Halftime show: Al Hirt, and marching bands from the University of Arizona and Grambling College

TV in the United States
- Network: CBS; NBC
- Announcers: CBS: Ray Scott, Jack Whitaker, Frank Gifford, Pat Summerall; NBC: Curt Gowdy, Paul Christman, Charlie Jones
- Nielsen ratings: CBS: 22.6 (est. 26.75 million viewers); NBC: 18.5 (est. 24.43 million viewers) (Total: 51.18 million viewers)
- Market share: CBS: 43; NBC: 36 (Total: 79)
- Cost of 30-second commercial: $42,000 (Both CBS and NBC)

Radio in the United States
- Network: CBS Radio; NBC Radio
- Announcers: CBS: Jack Drees, Tom Hedrick; NBC: Jim Simpson, George Ratterman

The first AFL–NFL World Championship Game (known retroactively as Super Bowl I and referred to in contemporaneous reports, including the game's radio broadcast, as the Super Bowl) was an American football game played on January 15, 1967, at the Los Angeles Memorial Coliseum in Los Angeles, California. The National Football League (NFL) champion Green Bay Packers defeated the American Football League (AFL) champion Kansas City Chiefs by the score of 35–10.

Coming into the game, billed by some as the "supergame", considerable animosity existed between the AFL and NFL, thus the teams representing the two rival leagues (the Chiefs and Packers, respectively) felt additional pressure to win. The Chiefs posted an 11–2–1 record during the regular season, and defeated the Buffalo Bills 31–7 in the AFL Championship Game. The Packers finished the regular season at 12–2 and defeated the Dallas Cowboys 34–27 in the NFL Championship Game. Many sportswriters and fans believed any team in the older NFL was vastly superior to any club in the upstart AFL, and so expected the Packers would blow out the Chiefs.

The first half of Super Bowl I was competitive, as the Chiefs outgained the Packers in total yards, 181–164, and kept pace with the Packers by posting a 14–10 score at halftime. Early in the third quarter, Packers safety Willie Wood intercepted a pass and returned it 50 yards to the 5-yard line. The turnover sparked the Packers to score 21 unanswered points in the second half. Packers quarterback Bart Starr, who completed 16 of 23 passes for 250 yards and two touchdowns, with one interception, was named MVP.

As NBC and CBS had held the rights to nationally televise AFL and NFL games, respectively, it was decided both networks were allowed to televise the game. The game remains the only Super Bowl to have been simulcast in the United States by two of the then-"Big Three" broadcast companies. Several recent Super Bowls have been simultaneously broadcast on network television as well as cable and streaming platforms.

== Background ==
=== Origins ===
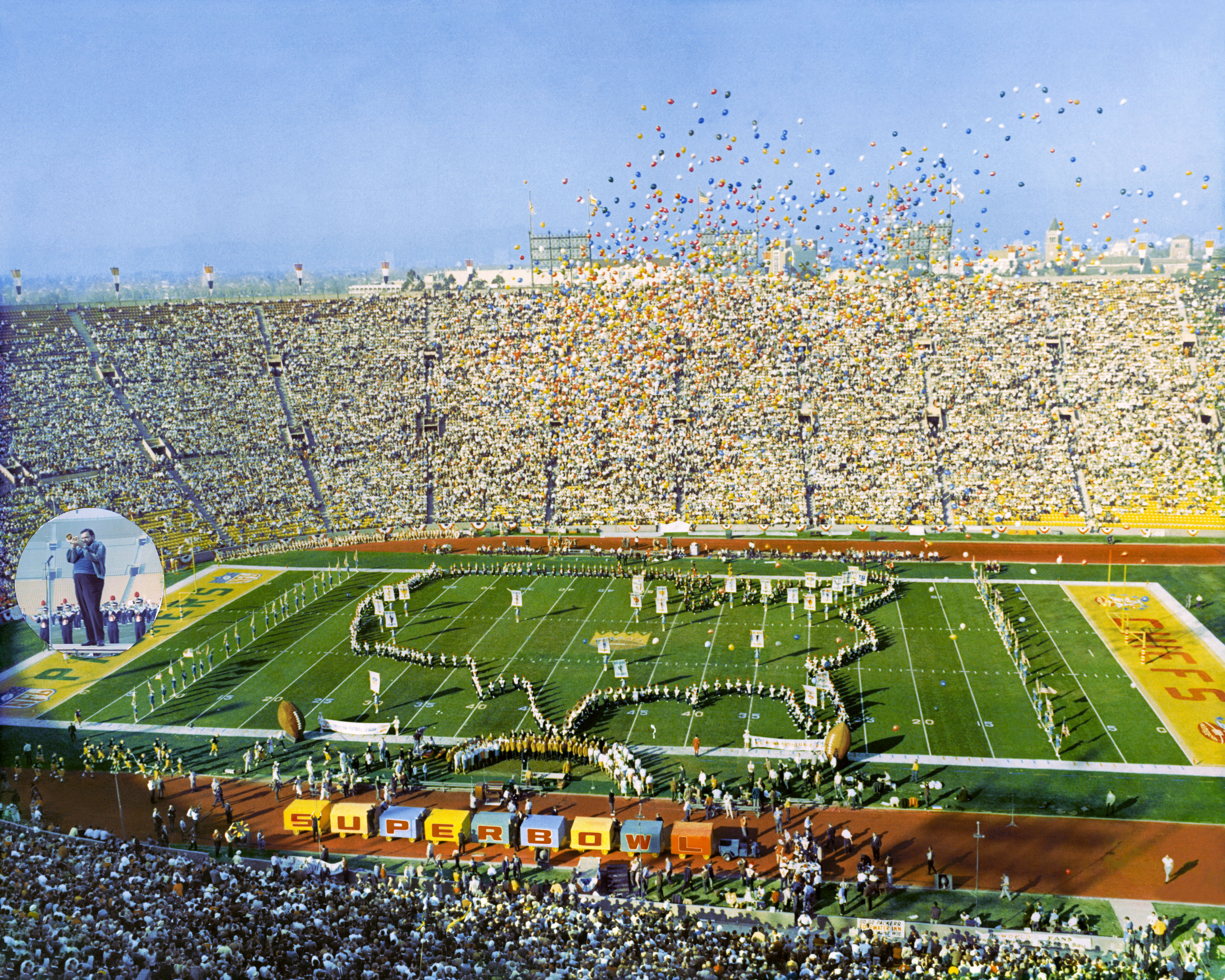
Los Angeles Memorial Coliseum on game day

When the NFL began its 41st season in 1960, it had a new and unwanted rival: the American Football League. The NFL had successfully fended off several other rival leagues in the past, and so the older league initially ignored the new upstart and its eight teams, figuring it would be made up of nothing but NFL rejects, and fans were unlikely to prefer it to the NFL. But unlike the NFL's prior rivals, the AFL survived and prospered, in part by signing "NFL rejects" who turned out to be highly talented players the older league had badly misjudged. Soon the NFL and AFL found themselves locked in a massive bidding war for the top free agents and prospects coming out of college. Originally, there was a tacit agreement between the two not to raid each other by signing players who were already under contract with a team from an opposing league. This policy broke down in early 1966 when the NFL's New York Giants signed Pete Gogolak, a placekicker who was under contract with the AFL's Buffalo Bills. The AFL owners considered this an "act of war" and immediately struck back, signing several contracted NFL players, including eight of their top quarterbacks.

Eventually, the NFL had enough and started negotiations with the AFL in an attempt to resolve the issue. As a result of the negotiations, the leagues signed a merger agreement on June 9, 1966. Among the details, both leagues agreed to share a common draft to end the bidding war for the top college players, as well as merge into a single league after the 1969 season. In addition, an "AFL–NFL World Championship Game" was established, in which the AFL and NFL champions would play against each other in a game at the end of the season to determine which league had the best team.

Los Angeles wasn't awarded the game until December 1, less than seven weeks before the kickoff; likewise, the date of the game was not set until December 13. Since the AFL Championship Game originally was scheduled for Monday, December 26, and the NFL Championship Game for Sunday, January 1, the "new" championship game was suggested to be played Sunday, January 8. An unprecedented TV doubleheader was held on January 1, with the AFL Championship Game telecast from Buffalo on NBC and the NFL Championship Game telecast from Dallas on CBS three hours later.

Coming into this "first" game, considerable animosity still existed between the two rival leagues, with both of them putting pressure on their respective champions to trounce the other and prove each league's dominance in professional football. Still, many sportswriters and fans believed the game was a mismatch, and any team from the long-established NFL was far superior to the best team from the upstart AFL.

The players' shares were $15,000 each for the winning team and $7,500 each for the losing team. This was in addition to the league championship money earned two weeks earlier: the Packers' shares were $8,600 each and the Chiefs' were $5,308 each.

=== Kansas City Chiefs ===
The Chiefs entered the game after an 11–2–1 regular season and a decisive 31–7 road win over the defending AFL champion Buffalo Bills in the AFL championship game on New Year's Day.

The Chiefs' high-powered offense led the AFL in points scored (448) and total rushing yards (2,274). Their trio of running backs, Mike Garrett (801 yards), Bert Coan (521 yards), and Curtis McClinton (540 yards) all ranked among the top-ten rushers in the AFL. Quarterback Len Dawson was the top-rated passer in the AFL, completing 159 of 284 (56%) of his passes for 2,527 yards and 26 touchdowns. Wide receiver Otis Taylor provided the team with a great deep threat by recording 58 receptions for 1,297 yards and eight touchdowns. Receiver Chris Burford added 58 receptions for 758 yards and eight touchdowns, and tight end Fred Arbanas, who had 22 catches for 305 yards and four touchdowns, was one of six Chiefs offensive players who were named to the All-AFL team. The Chiefs' offensive line was led by tackle Jim Tyrer, who had been selected to the AFL Pro Bowl for the 5th time in his career.

The Chiefs also had a strong defense, with All-AFL players Jerry Mays and Buck Buchanan anchoring their line. Linebacker Bobby Bell, who was also named to the All-AFL team, was great at run stopping and pass coverage. The strongest part of their defense, though, was their secondary, led by All-AFL safeties Johnny Robinson and Bobby Hunt, who each recorded 10 interceptions, and Fred Williamson, who recorded four. Their head coach was none other than Hank Stram.

=== Green Bay Packers ===
The Packers were an NFL dynasty, turning around what had been a losing team just eight years earlier. The team had post an NFL-worst 1–10–1 record in 1958 before head coach Vince Lombardi was hired in January 1959. "Their offense was like a conga dance", one sportswriter quipped. "1, 2, 3 and kick."

Lombardi was determined to build a winning team. During the preseason, he signed Fred "Fuzzy" Thurston, who had been cut from three other teams, but ended up becoming an All-Pro left guard for the Packers. Lombardi also made a big trade with the Cleveland Browns which brought three players to the team who would become cornerstones of the defense: linemen Henry Jordan, Willie Davis, and Bill Quinlan.

Lombardi's hard work paid off, and the Packers improved to a 7–5 regular-season record in 1959. They surprised the league during the following year by making it to the 1960 NFL Championship Game. Although the Packers lost, 17–13, to the Philadelphia Eagles, they had sent a clear message they were no longer losers. The Packers went on to win NFL Championships in 1961, 1962, 1965, and 1966.

Packers veteran quarterback Bart Starr was the top-rated quarterback in the NFL for 1966, and won the NFL Most Valuable Player Award, completing 156 of 251 (62.2%) passes for 2,257 yards (9.0 per attempt), 14 touchdowns, and only three interceptions. His top targets were wide receivers Boyd Dowler and Carroll Dale, who combined for 63 receptions for 1,336 yards. Fullback Jim Taylor was the team's top rusher with 705 yards, adding four touchdowns, and caught 41 passes for 331 yards and two touchdowns. (Before the season, Taylor had informed the team instead of returning to the Packers in 1967, he would play out his option and sign with the expansion New Orleans Saints. Lombardi, infuriated at what he considered to be Taylor's disloyalty, refused to speak to Taylor the entire season.) The team's starting halfback, Paul Hornung, was injured early in the season and replaced by running back Elijah Pitts, who gained 857 all-purpose yards. The Packers' offensive line was also a big reason for the team's success, led by All-Pro guards Jerry Kramer, and Fuzzy Thurston, and tackle Forrest Gregg.

The Packers also had an excellent defense which displayed their talent in the NFL championship game, stopping the Dallas Cowboys on four consecutive plays starting from the Packers' 2-yard line on the final drive to win the game. Lionel Aldridge had replaced Quinlan, but Jordan and Davis still anchored the defensive line; linebacker Ray Nitschke excelled at run stopping and pass coverage, while the secondary was led by Herb Adderley and Willie Wood. Wood was another example of how Lombardi found talent nobody else could see. Wood had been a quarterback in college and was not drafted by an NFL team. When Wood joined the Packers in 1960, he was converted to a free safety and went on to make the All-Pro team nine times in his 12-year career.

=== Pregame news and notes ===
Many people considered it fitting the Chiefs and the Packers would be the teams to play in the first AFL–NFL World Championship Game. Chiefs owner Lamar Hunt had founded the AFL, while the Packers were widely considered one of the best teams in NFL history (even if they could not claim to be founding members of their league, as the Packers joined the NFL in 1921, a year after the league's formation). Lombardi was under intense pressure from the entire NFL to make sure the Packers not only won the game but preferably won big to demonstrate the superiority of the NFL. CBS announcer Frank Gifford, who interviewed Lombardi before the game, said Lombardi was so nervous, "he held onto my arm and he was shaking like a leaf. It was incredible." The Chiefs saw this game as an opportunity to show they were good enough to play against any NFL team. One player who was looking forward to competing in this game was Len Dawson, who had spent three years as a backup in the NFL before joining the Chiefs. However, the Chiefs were also nervous. Linebacker E. J. Holub said, "the Chiefs were scared to death. Guys in the tunnel were throwing up."

In the week before the game, Chiefs cornerback Fred "The Hammer" Williamson garnered considerable publicity by boasting he would use his "hammer" – forearm blows to the head – to destroy the Packers' receivers, stating, "Two hammers to (Boyd) Dowler, one to (Carroll) Dale should be enough."

The Packers practiced at UC Santa Barbara, and the Chiefs at Veterans Field in Long Beach.

The temperature was mild with clear skies.

The two teams played with their respective footballs from each league; the Chiefs' offense used the AFL ball, the slightly narrower and longer J5V by Spalding, and the Packers played with the NFL ball, "The Duke" by Wilson.

The AFL's two-point conversion rule was not in force; the NFL added the two-point conversion in 1994 and it was first used in the Super Bowl (XXIX) that season, in January 1995.

This was the only Super Bowl where the numeric yard markers were five yards apart, rather than ten as is customary today. In 1972, marking yard lines ending in "5" was disallowed in the NFL in order to standardize field markings. It was also the last professional gridiron game played with double-support goalposts. The "slingshot" goalpost, with a single support, had made its debut a few weeks before Super Bowl I in the 1966 CFL playoffs. It became standard across all three professional leagues then operating in 1967.

Tickets for this game were priced at twelve, ten, and six dollars, which was equivalent to $109, $90, and $55 in 2023 when adjusted for inflation.

== Broadcasting ==
At the time, NBC held the rights to nationally televise AFL games while CBS had the rights to broadcast NFL games. Both networks were allowed to cover the game, each using its own announcers. Ray Scott (doing play-by-play for the first half), Jack Whitaker (doing play-by-play for the second half) and Frank Gifford provided commentary on CBS, while Curt Gowdy and Paul Christman were on NBC.

However, during the week preceding the game, tensions flared between the staff of the two networks (longtime arch-rivals in American broadcasting), who each wanted to win the rating war, to the point where a fence was built between the CBS and NBC trucks. In addition, Rozelle decreed NBC would not be able to use its cameramen and technical personnel, instead forcing it to use the feed provided by CBS, since the Coliseum was home to the NFL's Rams.

This game remains the only Super Bowl to have been broadcast in the United States by two of the "Big Three" broadcast companies. It was the only NFL game to be carried nationally on more than one broadcaster until the same two networks (as well as NFL Network and various local ABC and MyNetworkTV affiliates) carried a game between the New England Patriots and the New York Giants on December 29, 2007, and it was the only Super Bowl to simulcast on multiple American networks until Super Bowl LVIII was broadcast on CBS and its sister network Nickelodeon in February 2024.

Super Bowl I was the only Super Bowl which was not a sellout, despite the television blackout in Los Angeles (at the time, the local blackout was required even at a neutral site and even if the stadium did sell out), shutting out the vast Los Angeles market and network-owned stations KNXT (Channel 2, CBS; now KCBS-TV) and KNBC (Channel 4, NBC). Of the 94,000-seat capacity in the Coliseum, 33,000 went unsold. Days before the game, local newspapers printed editorials about what they viewed as an exorbitant ticket price of $12 (equivalent to $116 in 2025), and wrote stories about how viewers could pull in the game from stations in surrounding markets such as Bakersfield, Santa Barbara and San Diego.

=== Ratings ===
CBS received a 22.6 rating and a market share of 43 for its broadcast, which was seen by 26.75 million people. NBC received an 18.5 rating and a market share of 36 for its broadcast, which was seen by 24.43 million people. Combined, the game received a market share of 79 and reached 51.18 million viewers.

=== Lost recording ===
All known broadcast tapes of the game in its entirety were subsequently wiped by both NBC and CBS to save costs, a common practice in the television industry at the time, as videotapes were very expensive (one half-hour tape cost around $300 at the time, equivalent to $2,900 in 2025 dollars). Additionally, it was not foreseen how big the game was going to become. This has prevented studies comparing each network's respective telecast.

For many years, only two small samples of the telecasts were known to have survived, showing Max McGee's opening touchdown and Jim Taylor's touchdown run. Both were shown in 1991 on HBO's Play by Play: A History of Sports Television and on the Super Bowl XXV pregame show. In January 2011, a partial recording of the CBS telecast was reported to have been found in a Pennsylvania attic and restored by the Paley Center for Media in New York. The two-inch color videotape is the most complete version of the broadcast yet discovered, missing only the halftime show and most of the third quarter. The NFL owns the broadcast copyright and has blocked its sale or distribution. After remaining anonymous and communicating with the media only through his lawyer since the recording's discovery, the owner of the recording, Troy Haupt, came forward to The New York Times in 2016 to tell his side of the story. The Paley Center has restored and digitized the footage and showed the recording to the public for the first time on February 10, 2024, as part of an exhibit, being staged in partnership with the NFL and the Pro Football Hall of Fame, on the history of the Super Bowl called "Beyond the Big Game".

NFL Films had a camera crew present, and retains a substantial amount of film footage in its archives, some of which have been released in its film productions. One such presentation was the NFL's Greatest Games episode about this Super Bowl, entitled "The Spectacle of a Sport" (also the title of the Super Bowl I highlight film).

On January 11, 2016, the NFL announced "in an exhaustive process that took months to complete, NFL Films searched its enormous archives of footage and were able to locate all 145 plays from Super Bowl I from more than a couple of dozen disparate sources. Once all the plays were located, NFL Films was able to put the plays in order and stitch them together while fully restoring, re-mastering, and color-correcting the footage. Finally, audio from the NBC Sports radio broadcast featuring announcers Jim Simpson and George Ratterman was layered on top of the footage to complete the broadcast. The final result represents the only known video footage of the entire action from Super Bowl I." It then announced NFL Network would broadcast the newly pieced together footage in its entirety on January 15, 2016—the 49th anniversary of the contest. This footage was nearly all on film with the exception of several player introductions and a post-game locker room chat between Pat Summerall and Pete Rozelle.

On June 25, 2025, missing episode hunter Ray Langstone spotted a 29-minute Avco Cartrivision release of highlights on eBay and announced this on the Missing Episodes Forum.

== Ceremonies and entertainment ==
The Los Angeles Ramettes, majorettes who had performed at all Rams home games, entertained during pregame festivities and after each quarter. Also during the pregame, the University of Arizona marching band created a physical outline of the continental United States at the center of the field, with the famed Anaheim High School drill team placing banners of each NFL and AFL team at each team's geographical location.

The postgame trophy presentation ceremony was handled by CBS' Pat Summerall and NBC's George Ratterman. Summerall and Ratterman were forced to share a single microphone.

=== Halftime show ===
Super Bowl I halftime show
- Part of: Super Bowl I
- Date: January 15, 1967
- Location: Los Angeles, California
- Venue: Los Angeles Memorial Coliseum
- Headliner: Al Hirt, and marching bands from the University of Arizona and Grambling College
- Special guests: Ana-Hi-Steppers
- Producer: Tommy Walker

Super Bowl halftime show chronology
| I (1967) | II (1968) |

The halftime show was produced by Tommy Walker, and featured trumpeter Al Hirt, the marching bands from the University of Arizona and Grambling College, the Ana-Hi-Steppers (more information below), 300 pigeons, 10,000 balloons and a flying demonstration by the hydrogen-peroxide-propelled Bell Rocket Air Men. In addition, the halftime featured a local high school drill team, the Ana-Hi-Steppers from Anaheim High School. The team joined the two university marching bands to form an outline of a United States map. Their transportation to and from the game was by school bus. This team was chosen due to their connection to Tommy Walker, whose children attended Anaheim High School. He had seen the Ana-Hi-Steppers perform and chose them over nationally famous drill teams since he only had three weeks to cast and produce the show.

During the halftime show the Chief's QB, Len Dawson, was photographed by a Life Magazine photographer, while he was resting in a chair on the sidelines, calmly inhaling on a cigarette, with a bottle of Fresca between his feet.

== Game summary ==
Balls from both leagues were used – when the Chiefs were on offense, the official AFL football (Spalding J5V) was used, and when the Packers were on offense, the official NFL ball (Wilson's "The Duke") was used. Even the officiating crew was a combination of AFL and NFL referees, with the NFL's Norm Schachter as the head referee.

=== First quarter ===
After the teams traded punts on their first possessions, the Packers drove 80 yards in six plays. The drive was highlighted by quarterback Bart Starr's passes to tight end Marv Fleming for 11 yards, to running back Elijah Pitts for 22 yards on a scramble, and to wide receiver Carroll Dale for 12 yards. The drive ended with Starr's 37-yard touchdown pass to wide receiver Max McGee, who had replaced re-injured starter Boyd Dowler earlier in the drive, giving Green Bay an early 7–0 lead. (Dowler had injured his shoulder two weeks prior after scoring a third-quarter touchdown; Cowboys safety Mike Gaechter had upended him several steps after scoring and he landed awkwardly.) McGee slipped past Chiefs cornerback Willie Mitchell, made a one-handed catch at the 23-yard line, and then went the distance for the touchdown. (McGee had also caught a touchdown pass after replacing an injured Dowler in the NFL championship game). On their ensuing drive, Kansas City moved the ball to Green Bay's 33-yard line, during which quarterback Len Dawson completed an 18-yard pass to tight end Fred Arbanas and running back Mike Garrett rushed for 9 yards, but kicker Mike Mercer missed a 40-yard field goal attempt wide left. The Packers picked up 3 yards on the next play to end the first quarter.

=== Second quarter ===
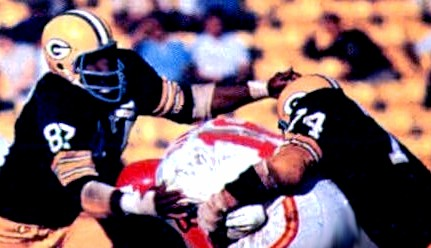
Defensive linemen Willie Davis (left) and Henry Jordan (right) sacking quarterback Len Dawson

Kansas City forced a three-and-out to start the second quarter, then got on the board with a six-play, 66-yard scoring drive, featuring passes by Dawson to Garrett for 15 yards, and to wide receiver Otis Taylor for 31 yards, which set up 1st-and-goal for the Chiefs at the Packers' 7-yard line. Dawson then threw a 7-yard touchdown pass to fullback Curtis McClinton to tie the game, 7–7. But the Packers responded with a 73-yard scoring drive on their next possession, which was again highlighted by Starr's key passes. On the third play of the drive, Starr appeared to complete a 64-yard touchdown pass to Dale, but this was nullified by a false start penalty against Green Bay. As the drive continued, however, Starr converted four straight third downs; he hit McGee for 10 yards on 3rd-and-6, then Dale for 15 on 3rd-and-10, then Fleming for 11 on 3rd-and-5, and then Pitts for 10 on 3rd-and-7 to set up fullback Jim Taylor's 14-yard touchdown run with the team's famed Packers sweep play. Taylor's rushing touchdown was the first in Super Bowl history.

On the first play of the Chiefs' next drive, defensive end Lionel Aldridge and defensive tackle Henry Jordan shared a sack on Dawson for an 8-yard loss, but he followed it up with four consecutive completions for 58 yards, including a 27-yard pass to wide receiver Chris Burford. This set up Mercer's 31-yard field goal to cut the Chiefs' deficit to 14–10 at the end of the half.

At halftime, the Chiefs appeared to have a chance to win. Many people watching the game were surprised at how close the score was and how well the AFL's champions were playing. Kansas City outgained Green Bay in total yards, 181–164, and had 11 first downs compared to the Packers' nine. The Chiefs were exuberant at halftime. Hank Stram said later, "I honestly thought we would come back and win it." The Packers were disappointed with the quality of their play in the first half. "The coach was concerned", said defensive end Willie Davis later. Lombardi told them the game plan was sound, but they had to tweak some things and execute better.

=== Third quarter ===
On their first drive of the second half, the Chiefs advanced to their 49-yard line with a chance to take their first lead of the game. But on a third-down pass play, a heavy blitz by linebackers Dave Robinson and Lee Roy Caffey collapsed the Chiefs' pocket. Robinson, Jordan, and Aldridge converged on Dawson, who threw weakly toward Arbanas. The wobbly pass was intercepted by safety Willie Wood, who raced 50 yards to Kansas City's 5-yard line before being dragged down from behind by Garrett. This was "the biggest play of the game," wrote Starr later. The Packers capitalized on the turnover on the next play with a 5-yard touchdown run by Pitts to increase their lead to 21–10. Stram agreed it was the critical point of the game. The Packers' defense then held the Chief scoreless for the rest of the game, allowing them to cross midfield only once, and for just one play. The Chiefs were forced to deviate from their game plan, and it hurt them. The Kansas City offense totaled only 12 yards in the third quarter, and Dawson was held to five of 12 second-half pass completions for 59 yards.

Meanwhile, Green Bay forced Kansas City to punt from their two-yard line after sacking Dawson twice and got the ball back with good field position on their own 44-yard line (despite a clipping penalty on the punt return). McGee subsequently caught three passes for 40 yards on a 56-yard drive. Taylor ran for one first down, Starr hit McGee for 16 yards on 3rd-and-11, and a third-down sweep with Taylor carrying gained 8 yards and a first down at the Kansas City 13. The drive ended with Starr's 13-yard touchdown pass to McGee on a post pattern, giving Green Bay a 28–10 lead.

=== Fourth quarter ===
After two punts by Kansas City and an interception at their own 11-yard line by Chiefs cornerback Willie Mitchell, midway through the fourth quarter, Starr completed a 25-yard pass to Dale and a 37-yard strike to McGee, moving the ball to the Chiefs' 18-yard line. Six plays later, Pitts scored his second touchdown of the game on a 1-yard run to close out the scoring, giving the Packers the 35–10 win. Also, in the fourth quarter, Chiefs defensive back Fred Williamson, who had boasted about his "hammer" before the game, was knocked out when his head collided with Packers running back Donny Anderson's knee, and then suffered a broken arm when Chiefs linebacker Sherrill Headrick fell on him. Williamson had three tackles for the game.

Packers halfback Paul Hornung was the only Packer to not see any action. Lombardi had asked him in the fourth quarter if he wanted to go in, but Hornung declined, not wanting to aggravate a pinched nerve in his neck. McGee, who caught only four passes for 91 yards and one touchdown during the season, finished Super Bowl I with seven receptions for 138 yards and two touchdowns. After the game was over, a reporter asked Vince Lombardi if he thought Kansas City was a good team. Lombardi responded though the Chiefs were an excellent, well-coached club, he thought several NFL teams such as Dallas were better.

=== Box score ===
Super Bowl I: Green Bay Packers 35, Kansas City Chiefs 10

| Quarter | 1 | 2 | 3 | 4 | Total |
|---|---|---|---|---|---|
| Chiefs (AFL) | 0 | 10 | 0 | 0 | 10 |
| Packers (NFL) | 7 | 7 | 14 | 7 | 35 |

at Los Angeles Memorial Coliseum, Los Angeles, California

- Date: January 15, 1967
- Game time: 1:15 p.m. PST
- Game weather: 72 °F (22 °C), sunny

Scoring summary

| Quarter | Time | Drive | | | Team | Scoring information | Score | |
| Quarter | Time | Plays | Yards | TOP | Team | Scoring information | KC | GB |
|---|---|---|---|---|---|---|---|---|
| 1 | 6:04 | 6 | 80 | 3:06 | GB | Max McGee 37-yard touchdown reception from Bart Starr, Don Chandler kick good | 0 | 7 |
| 2 | 10:40 | 6 | 66 | 3:44 | KC | Curtis McClinton 7-yard touchdown reception from Len Dawson, Mike Mercer kick good | 7 | 7 |
| 2 | 4:37 | 13 | 73 | 6:03 | GB | Jim Taylor 14-yard touchdown run, Chandler kick good | 7 | 14 |
| 2 | 0:54 | 7 | 50 | 3:43 | KC | 31-yard field goal by Mercer | 10 | 14 |
| 3 | 12:33 | 1 | 5 | 0:09 | GB | Elijah Pitts 5-yard touchdown run, Chandler kick good | 10 | 21 |
| 3 | 0:51 | 10 | 56 | 5:25 | GB | McGee 13-yard touchdown reception from Starr, Chandler kick good | 10 | 28 |
| 4 | 6:35 | 8 | 80 | 4:13 | GB | Pitts 1-yard touchdown run, Chandler kick good | 10 | 35 |
| "TOP" = time of possession. For other American football terms, see Glossary of American football. | | | | | | | 10 | 35 |

== Final statistics ==
Sources: NFL.com Super Bowl I, Super Bowl Play Finder GB, Super Bowl Play Finder KC

=== Statistical comparison ===
| | Kansas City Chiefs | Green Bay Packers |
|---|---|---|
| First downs | 17 | 21 |
| First downs rushing | 4 | 10 |
| First downs passing | 12 | 11 |
| First downs penalty | 1 | 0 |
| Third down efficiency | 3/13 | 11/15 |
| Fourth down efficiency | 0/0 | 0/0 |
| Net yards rushing | 72 | 133 |
| Rushing attempts | 19 | 34 |
| Yards per rush | 3.8 | 3.9 |
| Passing – completions/attempts | 17/32 | 16/24 |
| Times sacked–total yards | 6–61 | 3–22 |
| Interceptions thrown | 1 | 1 |
| Net yards passing | 167 | 228 |
| Total net yards | 239 | 361 |
| Punt returns–total yards | 3–19 | 4–23 |
| Kickoff returns–total yards | 6–130 | 3–65 |
| Interceptions–total return yards | 1–0 | 1–50 |
| Punts–average yardage | 7–45.3 | 4–43.3 |
| Fumbles–lost | 1–0 | 1–0 |
| Penalties–total yards | 4–26 | 4–40 |
| Time of possession | 28:35 | 31:25 |
| Turnovers | 1 | 1 |

Note: According to NBC Radio announcer Jim Simpson's report at halftime of the game, Kansas City led 11–9 in first downs at halftime, 181–164 in total yards, and 142–113 in passing yards (Green Bay led 51–39 in rushing yards). Bart Starr completed eight of 13 with no interceptions, while Len Dawson was 11 of 15 with no interceptions. Green Bay led 14–10 at halftime. Green Bay had the ball five times, although only for a minute or so on the last possession; they punted on their first possession, scored a touchdown on their second, punted on their third, scored a touchdown on their fourth, and had the ball when the half ended on their fifth. Kansas City had the ball four times – punting on their first possession, driving to a missed field goal on their second possession, scoring a touchdown on their third, and kicking a field goal on their fourth.

This means, in the second half, Green Bay led 12–6 in first downs, 197–58 in total yards, 115–25 in passing yards, and 82–33 in rushing yards (the Packers won the second half, 21–0). Starr and his late-game replacement, Zeke Bratkowski, were eight for 11 with one interception; Dawson and his late-game replacement, Pete Beathard, were just six for 17, also with one interception. Each team had the ball seven times in the second half, although Green Bay's first possession was just one play and their seventh possession was abbreviated because the game ended. Green Bay scored a touchdown on their first (one play) possession, punted on their second, scored a touchdown on their third, was intercepted at Kansas City's 15-yard line on their fourth (just Starr's fourth interception of the year), scored a touchdown on their fifth, punted on their sixth, and had the ball when the game ended on their seventh possession. Kansas City was intercepted on their first possession – Wood's return to the five set up Pitts' touchdown which made the score 21–10 – and then punted on each of their next six possessions.

=== Individual statistics ===
Chiefs passing
| | C/ATT^{1} | Yds | TD | INT | Rating |
|---|---|---|---|---|---|
| Len Dawson | 16/27 | 211 | 1 | 1 | 80.9 |
| Pete Beathard | 1/5 | 17 | 0 | 0 | 41.3 |
Chiefs rushing
| | Car^{2} | Yds | TD | LG^{3} | Yds/Car |
| Len Dawson | 3 | 24 | 0 | 15 | 8.00 |
| Mike Garrett | 6 | 17 | 0 | 9 | 2.83 |
| Curtis McClinton | 6 | 16 | 0 | 6 | 2.67 |
| Pete Beathard | 1 | 14 | 0 | 14 | 14.00 |
| Bert Coan | 3 | 1 | 0 | 3 | 0.33 |
Chiefs receiving
| | Rec^{4} | Yds | TD | LG^{3} | Target^{5} |
| Chris Burford | 4 | 67 | 0 | 27 | 10 |
| Otis Taylor | 4 | 57 | 0 | 31 | 9 |
| Mike Garrett | 3 | 28 | 0 | 17 | 5 |
| Curtis McClinton | 2 | 34 | 1 | 27 | 2 |
| Fred Arbanas | 2 | 30 | 0 | 18 | 3 |
| Reg Carolan | 1 | 7 | 0 | 7 | 1 |
| Bert Coan | 1 | 5 | 0 | 5 | 1 |

Packers passing
| | C/ATT^{1} | Yds | TD | INT | Rating |
|---|---|---|---|---|---|
| Bart Starr | 16/23 | 250 | 2 | 1 | 116.2 |
| Zeke Bratkowski | 0/1 | 0 | 0 | 0 | 39.6 |
Packers rushing
| | Car^{2} | Yds | TD | LG^{3} | Yds/Car |
| Jim Taylor | 17 | 56 | 1 | 14 | 3.29 |
| Elijah Pitts | 11 | 45 | 2 | 12 | 4.09 |
| Donny Anderson | 4 | 30 | 0 | 13 | 7.50 |
| Jim Grabowski | 2 | 2 | 0 | 2 | 1.00 |
Packers receiving
| | Rec^{4} | Yds | TD | LG^{3} | Target^{5} |
| Max McGee | 7 | 138 | 2 | 37 | 10 |
| Carroll Dale | 4 | 59 | 0 | 25 | 8 |
| Elijah Pitts | 2 | 32 | 0 | 22 | 3 |
| Marv Fleming | 2 | 22 | 0 | 11 | 2 |
| Jim Taylor | 1 | −1 | 0 | −1 | 1 |

^{1}Completions/attempts ^{2}Carries ^{3}Long gain ^{4}Receptions ^{5}Times targeted

=== Records established ===
Because this was the first Super Bowl, a new record was set in every category. All categories are listed in the 2016 NFL Fact book. The following records were set in Super Bowl I, according to the official NFL.com boxscore and the Pro-Football-Reference.com game summary.
Some records have to meet NFL minimum number of attempts to be recognized. The minimums are shown (in parentheses).

Player records established
| Most points scored, game | 12 | Max McGee; Elijah Pitts (Green Bay) |
| Most points scored, career | 12 | Max McGee; Elijah Pitts (Green Bay) |
| Most touchdowns, game | 2 | Max McGee; Elijah Pitts (Green Bay) |
| Most touchdowns, career | 2 | Max McGee; Elijah Pitts (Green Bay) |
| Longest scoring play | 37-yard pass | Max McGee |
Passing records
| Most attempts, game | 27 | Len Dawson (Kansas City) |
| Most attempts, career | 27 | Len Dawson (Kansas City) |
| Most completions, game | 16 | Len Dawson (Kansas City); Bart Starr (Green Bay) |
| Most completions, career | 16 | Len Dawson (Kansas City); Bart Starr (Green Bay) |
| Most interceptions thrown, game | 1 | Len Dawson (Kansas City); Bart Starr (Green Bay) |
| Most interceptions thrown, career | 1 | Len Dawson (Kansas City); Bart Starr (Green Bay) |
| Highest passer rating, game | 116.2 | Bart Starr |
| Highest completion percentage, game, (20 attempts) | 69.6% | Bart Starr |
| Most passing yards, game | 250 yards | Bart Starr |
| Most passing yards, career | 250 yards | Bart Starr |
| Longest pass | 37 yards | Bart Starr |
| Highest average gain, game (20 attempts) | 10.87 yards (23–250) | Bart Starr |
| Most touchdown passes, game | 2 | Bart Starr |
| Most touchdown passes, career | 2 | Bart Starr |
Rushing records
| Most yards, game | 56 yards | Jim Taylor (Green Bay) |
| Most yards, career | 56 yards | Jim Taylor (Green Bay) |
| Most attempts, game | 17 | Jim Taylor (Green Bay) |
| Most attempts, career | 17 | Jim Taylor (Green Bay) |
| Longest Touchdown Run | 14 yards | Jim Taylor (Green Bay) |
| Longest run from scrimmage | 15 yards | Len Dawson |
| Most rushing yards, game, quarterback | 24 yards | Len Dawson |
| Most touchdowns, game | 2 | Elijah Pitts |
| Most touchdowns, career | 2 | Elijah Pitts |
| Highest average gain, game (10 attempts) | 4.0 yards (11–45) | Elijah Pitts |
Receiving records
| Most yards, game | 138 yards | Max McGee |
| Most yards, career | 138 yards | Max McGee |
| Most receptions, game | 7 | Max McGee |
| Most receptions, career | 7 | Max McGee |
| Longest reception | 37 yards | Max McGee |
| Longest touchdown reception | 37 yards | Max McGee |
| Highest average gain, game (3 receptions) | 19.7 yards (7–138) | Max McGee |
| Most touchdowns, game | 2 | Max McGee |
| Most touchdowns, career | 2 | Max McGee |
Combined yardage records ^{†}
| Most attempts, game | 18 | Jim Taylor |
| Most Attempts, career | 18 | Jim Taylor |
| Most yards gained, game | 138 | Max McGee |
| Most yards gained, career | 138 | Max McGee |
Fumbles
| Most fumbles, game | 1 | Jim Grabowski (Green Bay); Curtis McClinton (Kansas City) |
| Most fumbles, career | 1 | Jim Grabowski (Green Bay); Curtis McClinton (Kansas City) |
Defense
| Most interceptions, game | 1 | Willie Wood (Green Bay); Willie Mitchell (Kansas City) |
| Most interceptions, career | 1 | Willie Wood (Green Bay); Willie Mitchell (Kansas City) |
| Most interception yards gained, game | 50 yards | Willie Wood |
| Most interception yards gained, career | 50 yards | Willie Wood |
| Longest interception return | 50 yards | Willie Wood |
| Most sacks, game ^{‡} | 1.5 | Henry Jordan (Green Bay); Willie Davis (Green Bay) |
| Most sacks, career ^{‡} | 1.5 | Henry Jordan (Green Bay); Willie Davis (Green Bay) |
Special Teams
| Longest kickoff return | 31 yards | Bert Coan (Kansas City) |
| Most kickoff returns, game | 4 | Bert Coan (Kansas City) |
| Most kickoff returns, career | 4 | Bert Coan (Kansas City) |
| Most kickoff return yards, game | 87 yards | Bert Coan (Kansas City) |
| Most kickoff return yards, career | 87 yards | Bert Coan (Kansas City) |
| Highest kickoff return average, game (3 returns) | 21.8 yards (4–87) | Bert Coan (Kansas City) |
| Highest kickoff return average, career (4 returns) | 21.8 yards (4–87) | Bert Coan (Kansas City) |
| Longest punt | 61 yards | Jerrel Wilson (Kansas City) |
| Most punts, game | 7 | Jerrel Wilson (Kansas City) |
| Most punts, career | 7 | Jerrel Wilson (Kansas City) |
| Highest punting average, game (4 punts) | 43.3 (7–317) | Jerrel Wilson (Kansas City) |
| Most punt returns, game | 3 | Donny Anderson (Green Bay) |
| Most punt returns, career | 3 | Donny Anderson (Green Bay) |
| Most punt return yards gained, game | 25 | Donny Anderson (Green Bay) |
| Most punt return yards gained, career | 25 | Donny Anderson (Green Bay) |
| Longest punt return | 15 | Donny Anderson (Green Bay) |
| Highest average, punt return yardage, game (3 returns) | 8.3 yards (3–25) | Donny Anderson (Green Bay) |
| Most field goals attempted, game | 2 | Mike Mercer (Kansas City) |
| Most field goals attempted, career | 2 | Mike Mercer (Kansas City) |
| Most field goals made, game | 1 | Mike Mercer (Kansas City) |
| Most field goals made, career | 1 | Mike Mercer (Kansas City) |
| Longest field goal | 31 | Mike Mercer (Kansas City) |
| Most (one point) extra points, game | 5 | Don Chandler (Green Bay) |
| Most (one point) extra points, career | 5 | Don Chandler (Green Bay) |

- † This category includes rushing, receiving, interception returns, punt returns, kickoff returns, and fumble returns.
- ‡ Sacks an official statistic since Super Bowl XVII by the NFL. Sacks are listed as "Tackled Attempting to Pass" in the official NFL box score for Super Bowl I.

Team records established
| Most Super Bowl appearances | 1 | Packers; Chiefs |
| Most Super Bowl victories | 1 | Packers |
| Most Super Bowl losses | 1 | Chiefs |
| Super Bowl win with no home playoff games | 2 games | Packers |
Points
| Most points, game | 35 | Packers |
| Fewest points, game | 10 | Chiefs |
| Largest margin of victory | 25 points | Packers |
| Most points scored, first half | 14 | Packers |
| Most points scored, second half | 21 | Packers |
| Most points scored in any quarter of play | 14 (3rd) | Packers |
| Most points, first quarter | 7 | Packers |
| Most points, second quarter | 10 | Chiefs |
| Most points, third quarter | 14 | Packers |
| Most points, fourth-quarter | 7 | Packers |
| Largest lead, end of first quarter | 7 points | Packers |
| Largest halftime margin | 4 points | Packers |
| Largest lead, end of 3rd quarter | 18 points | Packers |
| Fewest points, first half | 10 | Chiefs |
| Fewest points, second half | 0 | Chiefs |
Touchdowns, PATs, field goals
| Most touchdowns, game | 5 | Packers |
| Fewest touchdowns, game | 1 | Chiefs |
| Longest touchdown scoring drive | 80 yards | Packers |
| Most (one point) PATs | 5 | Packers |
| Most field goals attempted | 2 | Chiefs |
| Most field goals made | 1 | Chiefs |
Net yards
| Most net yards, rushing and passing | 361 | Packers |
| Fewest net yards, rushing and passing | 239 | Chiefs |
Rushing
| Most rushing attempts | 34 | Packers |
| Fewest rushing attempts | 19 | Chiefs |
| Most rushing yards (net) | 133 | Packers |
| Fewest rushing yards (net) | 72 | Chiefs |
| Highest average gain per rush attempt | 3.9 yards | Packers (133–34) |
| Lowest average gain per rush attempt | 3.8 yards | Chiefs (72–19) |
| Most rushing touchdowns | 3 | Packers |
| Fewest rushing touchdowns | 0 | Chiefs |
Passing
| Most passing attempts | 32 | Chiefs |
| Fewest passing attempts | 23 | Packers |
| Most passes completed | 17 | Chiefs |
| Fewest passes completed | 16 | Packers |
| Highest completion percentage (20 attempts) | 69.6% | Packers (16–23) |
| Lowest completion percentage (20 attempts) | 53.1% | Chiefs (17–32) |
| Most yards passing (net) | 228 | Packers |
| Fewest yards passing (net) | 167 | Chiefs |
| Highest average yards gained per pass attempt | 9.9 yards | Packers (228–23) |
| Lowest average yards gained per pass attempt | 5.2 yards | Chiefs (167–32) |
| Most times intercepted | 1 | Packers; Chiefs |
| Most times sacked | 6 | Chiefs |
| Fewest times sacked | 3 | Packers |
| Most passing touchdowns | 2 | Packers |
| Fewest passing touchdowns | 1 | Chiefs |
First downs
| Most first downs | 21 | Packers |
| Fewest first downs | 17 | Chiefs |
| Most first downs rushing | 10 | Packers |
| Fewest first downs rushing | 4 | Chiefs |
| Most first downs, passing | 12 | Chiefs |
| Fewest first downs passing | 11 | Packers |
| Most first downs, penalty | 1 | Chiefs |
| Fewest first downs penalty | 0 | Packers |
Defense
| Most Interceptions by | 1 | Packers; Chiefs |
| Most yards gained by interception return | 50 yards | Packers |
| Most sacks, game | 6 | Packers |
| Fewest sacks, game | 3 | Chiefs |
| Fewest yards allowed | 239 | Packers |
| Most yards allowed | 358 | Chiefs |
| Most yards allowed in a win | 239 | Packers |
Fumbles
| Most fumbles, game | 1 | Packers; Chiefs |
| Most fumbles lost, game | 0 | Packers; Chiefs |
| Most fumbles recovered, game | 1 | Packers; Chiefs |
Turnovers
| Most turnovers, game | 1 | Packers; Chiefs |
| Fewest turnovers, game | 1 | Packers; Chiefs |
Kickoff returns
| Most kickoff returns, game | 6 | Chiefs |
| Fewest kickoff returns, game | 3 | Packers |
| Most yards gained, game | 130 | Chiefs |
| Fewest yards gained, game | 65 | Packers |
| Highest average gain, game (3 returns) | 21.7 yards | Packers (65–3); Chiefs (130–6) |
Punting
| Most punts, game | 7 | Chiefs |
| Fewest punts, game | 4 | Packers |
| Highest average, game (4 punts) | 45.3 yards | Chiefs |
Punt returns
| Most punt returns, game | 4 | Packers |
| Fewest punt returns, game | 3 | Chiefs |
| Most yards gained, game | 23 | Packers |
| Fewest yards gained, game | 19 | Chiefs |
| Highest average return yardage, game (3 returns) | 6.3 yards | Chiefs (19–3) |
Penalties
| Most penalties, game | 4 | Packers; Chiefs |
| Most yards penalized, game | 40 | Packers |
| Fewest yards penalized, game | 26 | Chiefs |

Turnovers are defined as the number of times losing the ball on interceptions and fumbles.

Records established, both team totals
| | Total | Green Bay | Kansas City |
Points, both teams
| Most points | 45 | 35 | 10 |
| Most points scored, first half | 24 | 14 | 10 |
| Most points scored, second half | 21 | 21 | 0 |
| Most points, first quarter | 7 | 7 | 0 |
| Most points, second quarter | 17 | 7 | 10 |
| Most points, third quarter | 14 | 14 | 0 |
| Most points, fourth quarter | 7 | 7 | 0 |
Touchdowns, PATs, field goals, both teams
| Most touchdowns | 6 | 5 | 1 |
| Most (one point) PATs | 6 | (5–5) | (1–1) |
| Most field goals attempted | 2 | 0 | 2 |
| Most field goals made | 1 | 0 | 1 |
Net yards, both teams
| Most net yards, rushing and passing | 600 | 361 | 239 |
Rushing, both teams
| Most rushing attempts | 53 | 34 | 19 |
| Most rushing yards (net) | 205 | 133 | 72 |
| Most rushing touchdowns | 3 | 3 | 0 |
Passing, both teams
| Most passing attempts | 55 | 23 | 32 |
| Most passes completed | 33 | 16 | 17 |
| Most passing yards (net) | 395 | 228 | 167 |
| Most times sacked | 9 | 3 | 6 |
| Most times intercepted | 2 | 1 | 1 |
| Most passing touchdowns | 3 | 2 | 1 |
First downs, both teams
| Most first downs | 38 | 21 | 17 |
| Most first downs rushing | 14 | 10 | 4 |
| Most first downs, passing | 23 | 11 | 12 |
| Most first downs, penalty | 1 | 0 | 1 |
Defense, both teams
| Most interceptions by | 2 | 1 | 1 |
| Most yards gained by interception return | 50 | 50 | 0 |
| Most sacks, game | 9 | 6 | 3 |
Fumbles, both teams
| Most fumbles | 2 | 1 | 1 |
| Most fumbles lost | 0 | 0 | 0 |
Turnovers, both teams
| Most Turnovers | 2 | 1 | 1 |
Kickoff returns, both teams
| Most kickoff returns | 9 | 3 | 6 |
| Most yards gained | 195 | 65 | 130 |
Punting, both teams
| Most punts, game | 11 | 4 | 7 |
Punt returns, both teams
| Most punt returns, game | 7 | 4 | 3 |
| Most yards gained, game | 42 | 23 | 19 |
Penalties, both teams
| Most penalties, game | 8 | 4 | 4 |
| Most yards penalized | 66 | 40 | 26 |

== Starting lineups ==
Hall of Fame ‡

| Kansas City | Position | Green Bay |
|---|---|---|
Offense
| Chris Burford | SE | Carroll Dale |
| Jim Tyrer | LT | Bob Skoronski |
| Ed Budde | LG | Fuzzy Thurston |
| Wayne Frazier | C | Bill Curry |
| Curt Merz | RG | Jerry Kramer ‡ |
| Dave Hill | RT | Forrest Gregg ‡ |
| Fred Arbanas | TE | Marv Fleming |
| Otis Taylor | FL | Boyd Dowler |
| Len Dawson ‡ | QB | Bart Starr ‡ |
| Mike Garrett | HB | Elijah Pitts |
| Curtis McClinton | FB | Jim Taylor ‡ |
Defense
| Jerry Mays | LE | Willie Davis‡ |
| Andy Rice | LT | Ron Kostelnik |
| Buck Buchanan ‡ | RT | Henry Jordan ‡ |
| Chuck Hurston | RE | Lionel Aldridge |
| Bobby Bell ‡ | LLB | Dave Robinson ‡ |
| Sherrill Headrick | MLB | Ray Nitschke ‡ |
| E. J. Holub | RLB | Lee Roy Caffey |
| Fred Williamson | LCB | Herb Adderley ‡ |
| Willie Mitchell | RCB | Bob Jeter |
| Bobby Hunt | LS | Tom Brown |
| Johnny Robinson‡ | RS | Willie Wood ‡ |

== Officials ==
- Referee: Norm Schachter (NFL)
- Umpire: George Young (AFL)
- Head linesman: Bernie Ulman (NFL)
- Line judge: Al Sabato (AFL)
- Back judge: Jack Reader (AFL)
- Field judge: Mike Lisetski (NFL)
- Alternate referee: Art McNally (NFL)
- Alternate umpire: Paul Trepinski (AFL)
- Alternate head linesman: Burl Toler (NFL)
- Alternate line judge: Harry Kessel (AFL)
- Alternate back judge: Charley Musser (AFL)
- Alternate field judge: Herman Rohrig (NFL)

Note: A six-official system was used by the NFL from 1965 through the 1977 season.

Since officials from the NFL and AFL wore different uniform designs, a "neutral" uniform was designed for this game. These uniforms had the familiar black and white stripes, but the sleeves were all black with the official's uniform number. This design was also worn in Super Bowl II, but was discontinued after the game when AFL officials began wearing uniforms identical to those of the NFL during the 1968 season, in anticipation of the AFL–NFL merger in 1970.

== See also ==
- 1966 NFL season
- 1966 AFL season
- American Football League playoffs
