= 1966 Kansas City Chiefs season =

7th season in franchise history; first Super Bowl appearance

- Owner: Lamar Hunt
- General manager: Jack Steadman
- Head coach: Hank Stram
- Home stadium: Municipal Stadium

Results
- Record: 11–2–1
- Division place: 1st AFL Western
- Playoffs: Won AFL Championship (at Bills) 31–7; Lost Super Bowl I (vs. Packers) 10–35
- AFL All-Stars: QB Len Dawson; RB Mike Garrett; FB Curtis McClinton; TE Jim Tyrer; WR Otis Taylor; G Ed Budde; DE Jerry Mays; DE Buck Buchanan; LB Bobby Bell; LB E.J. Holub; LB Sherrill Headrick; S Johnny Robinson

The 1966 Kansas City Chiefs season was the team's seventh season in the American Football League (AFL) and fourth in Kansas City. With an 11–2 regular season record, the Chiefs won the Western Division and defeated the Buffalo Bills 31–7 to win their second AFL Championship, their first in Kansas City.

By winning the AFL Championship, the Chiefs were invited to play in the inaugural AFL-NFL World Championship Game, which would later be known as Super Bowl I, against the NFL's Green Bay Packers. The contest between the best of the NFL vs AFL was a contest for one half, but the Packers pulled away in the second half for a 35–10 victory.

== Offseason ==
=== Draft ===
1966 Kansas City Chiefs draft
Round	Pick	Player	Position	College	Notes
1	6	Aaron Brown	Defensive end	Minnesota	
2	15	Francis Peay	Tackle	Missouri	
3	23	Walt Barnes	Defensive tackle	Nebraska	
4	31	Elijah Gibson	Running back	Bethune–Cookman	
5	39	Doug Van Horn	Guard	Ohio State	
6	47	John Osmond	Center	Tulsa	
7	56	Charlie Gogolak	Kicker	Princeton	
8	69	Fletcher Smith	Safety	Tennessee State	
9	79	Dick Smith	Defensive back	Northwestern	
10	88	Fred Dawston	Defensive back	South Carolina State	
Made roster

=== Undrafted free agents ===
1966 undrafted free agents of note
Player	Position	College
Rudy Barber	Liinebacker	Bethune–Cookman

== Roster ==
1966 Kansas City Chiefs roster
Quarterbacks (QB): 10 Pete Beathard; 16 Len Dawson; Running backs (RB): 33 Bert Coan; 21 Mike Garrett; 32 Curtis McClinton; 45 Gene Thomas; Wide receivers (WR): 88 Chris Burford; 25 Frank Pitts; 89 Otis Taylor; Tight ends (TE): 84 Fred Arbanas; 80 Reggie Carolan	Offensive linemen (OL): 71 Ed Budde G; 73 Dave Hill T; 64 Curt Merz G; 77 Jim Tyrer T; 61 Dennis Biodrowski G; 72 Tony DiMidio T; 66 Wayne Frazier C; 60 Al Reynolds G; Defensive linemen (DL): 87 Aaron Brown DE; 86 Buck Buchanan DT; 85 Chuck Hurston DE; 75 Jerry Mays DE; 58 Andy Rice DT; 76 Hatch Rosdahl DT	Linebackers (LB): 52 Bud Abell OLB; 78 Bobby Bell OLB; 56 Walt Corey OLB; 69 Sherrill Headrick MLB; 55 E. J. Holub OLB; 35 Stewart Stover MLB; Defensive backs (DB): 20 Bobby Hunt SS; 22 Willie Mitchell CB; 14 Bobby Ply FS; 42 Johnny Robinson FS; 17 Fletcher Smith CB/S; 18 Emmitt Thomas CB; 24 Fred Williamson CB; Special teams (ST): 15 Mike Mercer K; 44 Jerrel Wilson P	Practice squad: -- Dave Bonds S; 38 Solomon Brannan CB/S; 65 Jon Gilliam C; -- Jerry Lamb WR; -- John Osmond C; -- Gloster Richardson WR; -- Wendell Tucker WR; Reserve: 81 Tommy Brooker K (IR); 70 Curt Farrier DT (IR); 82 Ed Lothamer DT (IR); Rookies in italics

== Preseason ==
Week	Date	Opponent	Result	Record	Venue	Attendance	Recap
1	August 6	at Denver Broncos	W 32–30	1–0	Bears Stadium	17,771	Recap
2	August 12	at Miami Dolphins	W 33–0	2–0	Miami Orange Bowl	36,366	Recap
3	August 20	vs. San Diego Chargers	W 31–21	3–0	Anaheim Stadium (Anaheim, California)	36,038	Recap
4	August 27	Houston Oilers	W 31–20	4–0	Municipal Stadium	25,270	Recap

== Regular season ==
=== Schedule ===
Week	Date	Opponent	Result	Record	Venue	Attendance	Recap
1	Bye						
2	September 11	at Buffalo Bills	**W** 42–20	1–0	War Memorial Stadium	42,023	Recap
3	September 18	at **Oakland Raiders**	**W** 32–10	2–0	Oakland–Alameda County Coliseum	50,746	Recap
4	September 25	at Boston Patriots	**W** 43–24	3–0	Fenway Park	22,641	Recap
5	October 2	Buffalo Bills	**L** 14–29	3–1	Municipal Stadium	43,885	Recap
6	October 8	**Denver Broncos**	**W** 37–10	4–1	Municipal Stadium	33,929	Recap
7	October 16	**Oakland Raiders**	**L** 13–34	4–2	Municipal Stadium	33,057	Recap
8	October 23	at **Denver Broncos**	**W** 56–10	5–2	Bears Stadium	26,196	Recap
9	October 30	Houston Oilers	**W** 48–23	6–2	Municipal Stadium	31,676	Recap
10	November 6	**San Diego Chargers**	**W** 24–14	7–2	Municipal Stadium	40,986	Recap
11	November 13	Miami Dolphins	**W** 34–16	8–2	Municipal Stadium	34,063	Recap
12	November 20	Boston Patriots	**T** 27–27	8–2–1	Municipal Stadium	41,475	Recap
13	November 27	at New York Jets	**W** 32–24	9–2–1	Shea Stadium	60,318	Recap
14	Bye						
15	December 11	at Miami Dolphins	**W** 19–18	10–2–1	Miami Orange Bowl	17,881	Recap
16	December 18	at **San Diego Chargers**	**W** 27–17	11–2–1	Balboa Stadium	28,348	Recap
Note: Intra-division opponents are in **bold** text.

== Standings ==
AFL Western Division
	W	L	T	PCT	DIV	PF	PA	STK
Kansas City Chiefs	11	2	1	.846	5–1	448	276	W3
Oakland Raiders	8	5	1	.615	4–2	315	288	W1
San Diego Chargers	7	6	1	.538	2–4	335	284	L1
Denver Broncos	4	10	0	.286	1–5	196	381	L2

Note: Tie games were not officially counted in the standings in the AFL.

== Postseason ==
=== Schedule ===
Round	Date	Opponent	Result	Record	Venue	Attendance	Recap
AFL Championship	January 1, 1967	at Buffalo Bills	W 31–7	1–0	War Memorial Stadium	42,080	Recap
Super Bowl I	January 15, 1967	vs. Green Bay Packers	L 10–35	1–1	Los Angeles Memorial Coliseum	61,946	Recap

=== 1966 AFL Championship ===
	1	2	3	4	Total
Chiefs	7	10	0	14	31
Bills	7	0	0	0	7

January 1, 1967, at War Memorial Stadium in Buffalo, New York
Attendance: 42,080

The host Bills entered the AFL title game as two-time defending champions, but the visiting Chiefs were three-point favorites, mainly because of their explosive and innovative offense led by head coach Hank Stram. The Bills were a more conventional team with a solid defensive line and a running mindset on offense. The two teams had split their season series, played early in the schedule without weather as a factor, with the road team winning each.

Played on a sunny day, a Bills fumble on the opening kickoff gave the Chiefs a short field to work with. Quarterback Len Dawson immediately took advantage of it, hitting Fred Arbanas for the game's first score. Buffalo quarterback Jack Kemp's first pass for the Bills was a 69-yard score to Elbert Dubenion. Late in the second quarter and trailing 14–7, Kemp led the Bills to the Kansas City 10. Bobby Crockett was open in the end zone, but Kemp's pass was intercepted by Johnny Robinson, who returned it 72 yards. That set up a Mike Mercer field goal to close out the first half with a ten-point lead.

Buffalo found no offensive rhythm in the second half, and the third quarter was scoreless. The Chiefs closed the game out in the fourth quarter with Dawson found Chris Burford for a 45-yard gain, setting up a one-foot touchdown run by rookie running back Mike Garrett, extending the lead to 24–7. Garrett scored his second touchdown less than two minutes later, following another Bills fumble.

==== Scoring summary ====
- First quarter
  - KC – Arbanas 29 pass from Dawson (Mercer kick), KC 7–0
  - BUF – Dubenion 69 pass from Kemp (Lusteg kick), 7–7 Tie
- Second quarter
  - KC – Taylor 29 pass from Dawson (Mercer kick), KC 14–7
  - KC – Field goal Mercer 32, KC 17–7
- Third quarter
  - no scoring
- Fourth quarter
  - KC – Garrett 1 run (Mercer kick), KC 24–7
  - KC – Garrett 18 run (Mercer kick), KC 31–7

Upon their return to Kansas City, the Chiefs were greeted by 12,000 fans at the airport. They split their players' shares for the title game 51 ways, or $5,308 each. Chiefs go to Super Bowl I but lost to the NFL Champion Packers 35-10.

=== First AFL-NFL World Championship (Super Bowl I) ===
	1	2	3	4	Total
Chiefs	0	10	0	0	10
Packers	7	7	14	7	35

January 15, 1967, at Los Angeles Memorial Coliseum in Los Angeles, California
Attendance: 61,946

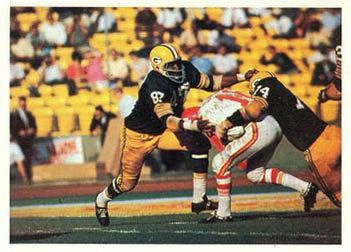
The Chiefs and the Packers in the first AFL–NFL Championship Game (Super Bowl I)

The first AFL-NFL World Championship Game, later known as Super Bowl I, was played at the Los Angeles Memorial Coliseum on January 15, 1967. The Chiefs faced the Green Bay Packers of the NFL, who finished their regular season at 12–2 and won the NFL championship game, their second consecutive and fourth in six seasons.

The Packers jumped out to an early 7–0 lead with quarterback Bart Starr's 37-yard touchdown pass to reserve receiver Max McGee, who had entered the game a few plays earlier for re-injured starter Boyd Dowler. Early in the second quarter, Kansas City marched 66 yards in 6 plays to tie the game on a 7-yard pass from quarterback Len Dawson to Curtis McClinton. But the Packers responded on their next drive, advancing 73 yards down the field and scoring on fullback Jim Taylor's 14-yard touchdown run with the team's famed "Power Sweep" play. With a minute left in the half, the lead was cut to 14–10 on Mike Mercer's 31-yard field goal.

Early in the second half, Dawson was intercepted by safety Willie Wood, who returned it 50 yards to the 5-yard line. On the next play, running back Elijah Pitts rushed for a touchdown, and the Packers led 21–10. Late in the third quarter, McGee scored his second touchdown of the game with a 13-yard reception from Starr, as Green Bay held the Chiefs' offense to 12 yards in the quarter. Pitts scored another touchdown for the Packers from a yard out midway through the fourth quarter for the final score, 35–10. Starr was named the MVP of the game, completing 16 of 23 passes for 250 yards and two touchdowns.

==== Scoring summary ====
- First quarter
  - GB – McGee 37 pass from Starr (Chandler kick), 7–0 GB
- Second quarter
  - KC – McClinton 7 pass from Dawson (Mercer kick), 7–7 Tie
  - GB – Taylor 14 run (Chandler kick), 14–7 GB
  - KC – FG Mercer 31, 14–10 GB
- Third quarter
  - GB – Pitts 5 run (Chandler kick), 21–10 GB
  - GB – McGee 13 pass from Starr (Chandler kick), 28–10 GB
- Fourth quarter
  - GB – Pitts 1 run (Chandler kick), 35–10 GB

The Kansas City players received $7,500 each as runners-up; combined with the AFL title game money, each Chief earned over $12,800 in the two-game postseason. Chiefs lose this game but in 1967 miss the playoffs 9-5. First time since 1965.

Preceded by Buffalo Bills; 1965	American Football League champion 1966	Succeeded by Oakland Raiders; 1967
