= Elijah Pitts Award =

The Elijah Pitts Award annual award is presented by the Conway Athletic Award Commission honoring lifetime achievement to Conway, Arkansas athletics. It is named in honor of Conway native Elijah Pitts.

Elijah Pitts was an American football halfback in the NFL for the Green Bay Packers, the Los Angeles Rams, and the New Orleans Saints. He attended high school in Conway, Arkansas at the segregated Pine Street High School. He played college football at Philander Smith College in Little Rock, Arkansas. Pitts scored two touchdowns in the original Super Bowl. He was inducted into the Green Bay Packers Hall of Fame in 1979. After his playing career ended, Pitts was an assistant coach for 25 years, mostly with the Buffalo Bills, coaching in all four of the Bills' Super Bowl appearances in the early 90s. In October 1997, while still the Bills' assistant head coach, Pitts was diagnosed with stomach cancer, which claimed his life nine months later at the age of 60.

== Winners ==
- 2000 - Warren Woodson (football coach)
- 2001 - Ivan Grove (football coach)
- 2002 - Doak Cambell (administration)
- 2003 - Scottie Pippen (basketball)
- 2004 - Joe Mallett (basketball coach)
- 2005 - Bob Courtway (swimming coach)
- 2006 - Raymond Bright (football / track coach)
- 2007 - Monte Coleman (football)
- 2008 - Bobby Tiner (football)
- 2009 - Cliff Garrison (basketball coach)
- 2010 - Harold Horton (football coach)
- 2012 - Jim Kelly (swimming coach)
