= Jason Franci =

American football player (1943–2018)

Jason Arthur Franci
No. 84
- Position: Wide receiver

Personal information
- Born: October 17, 1943; Fort Bragg, California, U.S.
- Died: October 29, 2018 (aged 75); Santa Rosa, California, U.S.
- Listed height: 6 ft 1 in (1.85 m)
- Listed weight: 210 lb (95 kg)

Career information
- College: UC Santa Barbara

Career history
- Denver Broncos (1966)
- Stats at Pro Football Reference

Jason Arthur Franci (October 17, 1943 – October 29, 2018) was an American football wide receiver who played for the American Football League's Denver Broncos and the Canadian Football League's Saskatchewan Roughriders.

== Early life and education ==
Franci was born on October 17, 1943, in Fort Bragg, California. He attended the University of California, Santa Barbara and played on the UC Santa Barbara Gauchos football team after previously attending Santa Rosa Junior College.

== Football career ==
Franci played in the 1966 American Football League season for the Denver Broncos and appeared in 10 games and wore jersey number 84. He was cut by the Broncos in August 1966. He played another two seasons in the Canadian Football League for the Saskatchewan Roughriders.

== Personal life ==
Franci became the head football coach for Montgomery High School in Santa Rosa, California in 1980. He had previously joined the school in 1970 and coached JV football, in addition to varsity basketball and track. The high school named the field after him in his honor. He died on October 29, 2018, and his memorial was held at the Montgomery High School where he coached and which bears his name.
