= 1966 Houston Oilers season =

NFL team season

- Owner: Bud Adams
- General manager: Don Klosterman
- Head coach: Wally Lemm
- Home stadium: Rice Stadium

Results
- Record: 3–11
- Division place: 4th AFL Eastern
- Playoffs: Did not qualify

The 1966 Houston Oilers season was the seventh season for the Houston Oilers as a professional AFL franchise; The team failed to improve on their previous output of 4–10, winning only three games. The Oilers failed to qualify for the playoffs for the fourth consecutive season, and were swept by the expansion Miami Dolphins. With that, they became the first team in the Super Bowl era from either league to be swept by an expansion team. This wouldn't happen again until 1995 when the Cleveland Browns were swept by the Jacksonville Jaguars.

== Season schedule ==
Two bye weeks were necessary in 1966, as the league expanded to an odd-number (9) of teams;
one team was idle each week (three teams were idle in week one). The Oilers played each team twice, except for two from other division (Kansas City, San Diego)

Week	Date	Opponent	Result	Record	Venue	Attendance	Recap
1	September 3	Denver Broncos	**W** 45–7	1–0	Rice Stadium	30,156	Recap
2	September 10	Oakland Raiders	**W** 31–0	2–0	Rice Stadium	31,763	Recap
3	September 18	at **New York Jets**	**L** 13–52	2–1	Shea Stadium	54,681	Recap
4	September 25	at **Buffalo Bills**	**L** 20–27	2–2	War Memorial Stadium	42,526	Recap
5	October 2	at Denver Broncos	**L** 38–40	2–3	Bears Stadium	27,203	Recap
6	Bye						
7	October 16	**New York Jets**	**W** 24–0	3–3	Rice Stadium	30,823	Recap
8	October 23	**Miami Dolphins**	**L** 13–20	3–4	Rice Stadium	23,173	Recap
9	October 30	at Kansas City Chiefs	**L** 23–48	3–5	Municipal Stadium	31,676	Recap
10	November 6	at Oakland Raiders	**L** 23–38	3–6	Oakland–Alameda County Coliseum	34,102	Recap
11	November 13	at **Boston Patriots**	**L** 21–27	3–7	Fenway Park	23,426	Recap
12	November 20	**Buffalo Bills**	**L** 20–42	3–8	Rice Stadium	27,312	Recap
13	Bye						
14	December 4	San Diego Chargers	**L** 22–28	3–9	Rice Stadium	17,569	Recap
15	December 11	**Boston Patriots**	**L** 14–38	3–10	Rice Stadium	17,100	Recap
16	December 18	at **Miami Dolphins**	**L** 28–29	3–11	Miami Orange Bowl	20,045	Recap
Note: Intra-division opponents are in **bold** text.

== Standings ==
AFL Eastern Division
	W	L	T	PCT	DIV	PF	PA	STK
Buffalo Bills	9	4	1	.692	6–2	358	255	W1
Boston Patriots	8	4	2	.667	5–1–1	315	283	L1
New York Jets	6	6	2	.500	4–3–1	322	312	W1
Houston Oilers	3	11	0	.214	1–7	335	396	L8
Miami Dolphins	3	11	0	.214	2–5	213	362	W1

Note: Tie games were not officially counted in the standings in the AFL.

== Roster ==
1966 Houston Oilers roster
Quarterbacks (QB): 16 George Blanda K; 10 Don Trull; 11 Buddy Humphrey; Running backs (RB): 42 Sid Blanks; 25 Ode Burrell; 32 Hoyle Granger; 35 John Henry Johnson; 44 Charley Tolar; Wide receivers (WR): 26 Larry Elkins; 28 Charley Frazier; 87 Charley Hennigan; Tight ends (TE): 89 Bob McLeod; 88 Bob Poole	Offensive linemen (OL): 66 Sonny Bishop G; 55 John Frongillo C; 78 Glen Ray Hines T; 50 Bobby Maples C; 77 Rich Michael T; 76 Walter Suggs T; 61 Bob Talamini G; 67 John Wittenborn G; Defensive linemen (DL): 70 Scott Appleton DT; 80 Gary Cutsinger DE; 75 Don Floyd DE; 62 Jim Hayes DE; 79 Pat Holmes DT; 99 Ernie Ladd DT; 72 George Rice DT	Linebackers (LB): 84 Johnny Baker OLB; 52 Garland Boyette OLB; 53 John Carrell MLB; 51 Ronnie Caveness MLB; 54 John Meyer OLB; 56 Olen Underwood OLB; Defensive backs (DB): 33 W. K. Hicks CB; 23 Bobby Jancik CB/FS; 43 Jim Norton SS/P; 30 Bernie Parrish CB; 40 Mickey Sutton FS; 34 Theo Viltz CB; Special teams (ST)	Practice squad: 73 George Allen T; -- Bill Groman WR; 86 Monte Ledbetter WR; 15 Jacky Lee QB; 82 Ed Scrutchins DE; 47 Allen Trammell S; Reserve: 85 Danny Brabham LB (IR); 27 Fred Glick S (IR); 36 Donnie Stone RB (IR); Rookies in italics
