= Malavasi =

Malavasi is a surname. Notable people with the surname include:

- Mauro Malavasi (born 1957), Italian pianist, songwriter and producer
- Ray Malavasi (1930–1987), American football coach, former head coach of two NFL teams (Denver Broncos and Los Angeles Rams)
- Renato Malavasi (1904–1998), Italian film actor
