= 1966 American Football League season =

American Football League season

1966 AFL season

Regular season
- Duration: September 2 – December 18, 1966

Playoffs
- Date: January 1, 1967
- Eastern champion: Buffalo Bills
- Western champion: Kansas City Chiefs
- Site: War Memorial Stadium, Buffalo, New York
- Champion: Kansas City Chiefs

AFL teams: West, East

The 1966 AFL season was the seventh regular season of the American Football League. The league began its merger process with the National Football League (NFL) in June, which took effect fully in 1970.

The season also saw the debut of the expansion Miami Dolphins, the AFL's ninth team (an odd number), requiring an idle team each week. A sixth official, the Line Judge, was added to the officiating crew; the NFL added the Line Judge the previous season.

The season ended when the Kansas City Chiefs defeated the two-time defending champion Buffalo Bills in the AFL Championship game, and were defeated by the NFL's Green Bay Packers in the first AFL-NFL World Championship Game, now known as Super Bowl I.

== Division races ==
The AFL now had nine teams, grouped into two divisions (the new Miami team was in the Eastern Division, now with five teams), and still played a 14-game schedule. In previous seasons (with eight clubs), each played a home-and-away game against the other seven. All nine teams faced each other at least once, and each team played six others twice. Though Boston and Miami were both in the Eastern Division, they met only once, on November 27 (each team played Western Division teams Kansas City and Denver twice, while Boston also played San Diego twice and Miami played Oakland twice --- meaning that the Patriots and Dolphins each had a schedule that called for them to face three non-division opponents more often than they played a divisional opponent).

As in earlier years, the division champions met in the league championship game, with the home team rotating, this year to the Eastern champion. If there was a tie in the standings at the top of either division, a one-game playoff would be held to determine the division winner, with the other division's winner idle.

Week	Eastern		Western	
1	Houston	1–0–0	Tie (Oak, SD)	1–0–0
2	Houston	2–0–0	Tie (KC, SD)	2–0–0
3	N.Y. Jets	2–0–0	Tie (KC, SD)	2–0–0
4	N.Y. Jets	3–0–0	Tie (KC, SD)	3–0–0
5	N.Y. Jets	3–0–1	San Diego	4–0–0
6	N.Y. Jets	4–0–1	Tie (KC, SD)	4–1–0
7	N.Y. Jets	4–1–1	San Diego	4–1–1
8	N.Y. Jets	4–2–1	Kansas City	5–2–0
9	Boston	4–2–1	Kansas City	6–2–0
10	Buffalo	5–3–1	Kansas City	7–2–0
11	Buffalo	6–3–1	Kansas City	8–2–0
12	Buffalo	7–3–1	Kansas City	8–2–1
13	Buffalo	8–3–1	Kansas City	9–2–1
14	Boston	7–3–2	Kansas City	9–2–1
15	Boston	8–3–2	Kansas City	10–2–1
16	Buffalo	9–4–1	Kansas City	11–2–1

== Regular season ==
Prior to the season, the AFL–NFL merger was announced in June, and both leagues agreed to have their champions meet in an annual AFL–NFL World Championship Game (later known as the Super Bowl), beginning in January 1967. Additionally, a common draft was introduced, with the first held in March 1967.

Also, the Miami Dolphins joined the AFL as its first expansion team. The Dolphins selected players both via participation in the 1966 American Football League draft, held in November 1965, and via a dedicated "stocking draft" held in January 1966. In the latter, the Dolphins could select certain players from existing AFL teams. In the regular season, Joe Auer scored the first touchdown in Dolphins history, returning an opening kickoff for 95 yards versus the Oakland Raiders.

=== Results ===
Home/Road		Eastern Division					Western Division			
Home/Road		BOS	BUF	HOU	MIA	NY	DEN	KC	OAK	SD
Eastern	Boston Patriots		14–3	27–21		24–24	10–17	24–43	24–21	35–17
Eastern	Buffalo Bills	10–20		27–20	58–24	14–3	38–21	20–42		17–17
Eastern	Houston Oilers	14–38	20–42		13–20	24–0	45–7		31–0	22–28
Eastern	Miami Dolphins	14–20	0–29	29–28		14–19	24–7	18–19	14–23	
Eastern	New York Jets	38–28	23–33	52–13	30–13			24–32	21–24	17–16
Western	Denver Broncos	10–24		40–38	17–7	7–16		10–56	3–17	20–17
Western	Kansas City Chiefs	27–27	14–29	48–23	34–16		37–10		13–34	24–14
Western	Oakland Raiders		10–31	38–23	21–10	28–28	28–10	10–32		20–29
Western	San Diego Chargers	24–0	27–7		44–10	42–27	24–17	17–27	19–41	

=== Standings ===
AFL Eastern Division
	W	L	T	PCT	DIV	PF	PA	STK
Buffalo Bills	9	4	1	.692	6–2	358	255	W1
Boston Patriots	8	4	2	.667	5–1–1	315	283	L1
New York Jets	6	6	2	.500	4–3–1	322	312	W1
Houston Oilers	3	11	0	.214	1–7	335	396	L8
Miami Dolphins	3	11	0	.214	2–5	213	362	W1

Note: Tie games were not officially counted in the standings in the AFL.

AFL Western Division
	W	L	T	PCT	DIV	PF	PA	STK
Kansas City Chiefs	11	2	1	.846	5–1	448	276	W3
Oakland Raiders	8	5	1	.615	4–2	315	288	W1
San Diego Chargers	7	6	1	.538	2–4	335	284	L1
Denver Broncos	4	10	0	.286	1–5	196	381	L2

== Playoffs ==
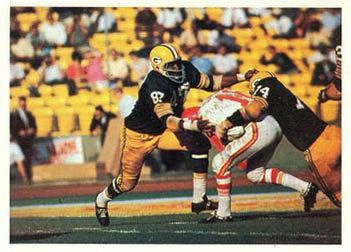
The Chiefs lost to the Packers in the first AFL–NFL Championship Game (Super Bowl I)

- AFL Championship Game
  - Kansas City Chiefs 31, Buffalo Bills 7, January 1, 1967, War Memorial Stadium, Buffalo, New York
- Super Bowl I
  - Green Bay Packers (NFL) 35, Kansas City Chiefs (AFL) 10, at Los Angeles Memorial Coliseum, Los Angeles, California

== Stadium changes ==
- The Oakland Raiders moved from Frank Youell Field to the new Oakland–Alameda County Coliseum
- The expansion Miami Dolphins began play at the Orange Bowl

== Coaching changes ==
=== Offseason ===
- Buffalo Bills: Lou Saban resigned and defensive coach Joe Collier was promoted.
- Houston Oilers: Hugh Taylor was fired and Wally Lemm took over as head coach in late January.
- Miami Dolphins: The expansion team's first head coach was George Wilson.
- Oakland Raiders: Al Davis stepped down as head coach in April to serve as AFL commissioner, and backfield coach John Rauch was promoted.

=== In-season ===
- Denver Broncos: Mac Speedie resigned after starting the season 0–2; line coach Ray Malavasi was interim head coach for the rest of the season.

== See also ==
- 1966 NFL season
