= 1966 Denver Broncos season =

American football team season

- Owner: Gerald Phipps
- General manager: James Burris
- Head coach: Mac Speedie (0–2); Ray Malavasi (4–8)
- Home stadium: Bears Stadium

Results
- Record: 4–10
- Division place: 4th AFL Western
- Playoffs: Did not qualify

The 1966 Denver Broncos season was the seventh season for the team in the American Football League (AFL). For the second straight season the Broncos posted a record of four wins, and ten losses, ranking last again for the fourth time in the AFL's Western Division. Following the second game of the season, head coach Mac Speedie abruptly resigned, and offensive line coach Ray Malavasi was the interim head coach for the remaining twelve games.

Denver's offense set a dubious all-time AFL record in 1966 with the fewest total points scored in a season, with 196, or 14 per game. The Broncos are the last team in major professional football (AFL or NFL) to go an entire game without picking up a first down, which they did in Week One at Houston.

This would be the final season that the "Bucking Bronco" logo would appear on the helmets.

== Offseason ==
=== NFL draft ===
1966 Denver Broncos draft
Round	Pick	Player	Position	College	Notes
1	4	Jerry Shay	Defensive tackle	Purdue	
Made roster † Pro Football Hall of Fame * Made at least one Pro Bowl during career

=== Undrafted free agents ===
1966 undrafted free agents of note
Player	Position	College
Allen McCune	Quarterback	West Virginia
Dave Robbins	Wide receiver	Catawba

== Personnel ==
=== Staff / Coaches ===
1966 Denver Broncos staff
Front office: Team Owner / Chairman of the Board – Gerald Phipps; Team President – Allan R Phipps; Executive Vice President/General Manager – James H Burris; Director of Player Personnel – Fred Gehrke; Head coaches: Head Coach – Mac Speedie; Offensive coaches: Offensive Backfield – Bus Mertes; Offensive Line – Ray Malavasi (interim Head Coach)	Defensive coaches: Defensive Line – Dale Dodrill; Defensive Backfield – Marv Matuszak

=== Roster ===
1966 Denver Broncos roster
Quarterbacks (QB): 15 Max Choboian; 17 Scotty Glacken; 10 John McCormick; 14 Mickey Slaughter; Running backs (RB): 33 Wendell Hayes; 28 Abner Haynes; 35 Mike Kellogg; 26 Darrell Lester; 27 Charley Mitchell; Wide receivers (WR): 31 Eric Crabtree; 84 Jason Franci; 82 Bob Scarpitto P; 87 Lionel Taylor; Tight ends (TE): 88 Al Denson; 89 Max Wettstein	Offensive linemen (OL): 74 Lee Bernet T; 76 Bob Breitenstein T; 68 Sam Brunelli G; 79 John Gonzaga G; 64 Jon Hohman G; 59 Larry Kaminski C; 52 Ray Kubala T; 73 Pat Matson G; 72 Jerry Sturm G; Defensive linemen (DL): 66 Larry Cox DT; 78 Marvin Davis DE; 62 Jerry Inman DT; 83 Ray Jacobs DT; 61 Bill Keating DT; 80 Dan LaRose DE; 81 Max Leetzow DE; 65 George Tarasovic DT; 77 Bob Young DE	Linebackers (LB): 56 John Bramlett OLB; 53 Don Gulseth MLB; 50 Jerry Hopkins MLB/OLB; 51 Gene Jeter OLB; 54 Ronald Sbranti OLB; Defensive backs (DB): 24 Willie Brown CB; 20 Billy Fletcher CB; 49 Glenn Glass SS; 23 Goose Gonsoulin FS; 46 John Griffin SS; 43 Bob Richardson CB; 45 Lew Scott CB; 21 Goldie Sellers FS/SS; 48 Nemiah Wilson CB; 42 Lonnie Wright SS; Special teams (ST): 7 Gary Kroner K	Reserve: 75 Eldon Danenhauer G (IR); Rookies in italics

== Regular season ==
=== Schedule ===
Week	Date	Opponent	Result	Record	Venue	Attendance	Recap
1	September 3	at Houston Oilers	**L** 7–45	0–1	Rice Stadium	30,156	Recap
2	Bye						
3	September 18	Boston Patriots	**L** 10–24	0–2	Bears Stadium	25,337	Recap
4	September 25	New York Jets	**L** 7–16	0–3	Bears Stadium	29,878	Recap
5	October 2	Houston Oilers	**W** 40–38	1–3	Bears Stadium	27,203	Recap
6	October 8	at **Kansas City Chiefs**	**L** 10–37	1–4	Municipal Stadium	33,929	Recap
7	October 16	at Miami Dolphins	**L** 7–24	1–5	Miami Orange Bowl	23,393	Recap
8	October 23	**Kansas City Chiefs**	**L** 10–56	1–6	Bears Stadium	26,196	Recap
9	October 30	at **San Diego Chargers**	**L** 17–24	1–7	Balboa Stadium	25,819	Recap
10	November 6	at Boston Patriots	**W** 17–10	2–7	Fenway Park	18,154	Recap
11	Bye						
12	November 20	**Oakland Raiders**	**L** 3–17	2–8	Bears Stadium	26,703	Recap
13	November 27	**San Diego Chargers**	**W** 20–17	3–8	Bears Stadium	24,860	Recap
14	December 4	Miami Dolphins	**W** 17–7	4–8	Bears Stadium	32,592	Recap
15	December 11	at **Oakland Raiders**	**L** 10–28	4–9	Oakland–Alameda County Coliseum	31,765	Recap
16	December 18	at Buffalo Bills	**L** 21–38	4–10	War Memorial Stadium	40,538	Recap
Note: Intra-division opponents are in **bold** text.

- With the expansion Miami Dolphins joining the AFL in 1966, there were an odd-number (9)
  of teams for two seasons, resulting in multiple bye weeks for each team.

=== Standings ===
AFL Western Division
	W	L	T	PCT	DIV	PF	PA	STK
Kansas City Chiefs	11	2	1	.846	5–1	448	276	W3
Oakland Raiders	8	5	1	.615	4–2	315	288	W1
San Diego Chargers	7	6	1	.538	2–4	335	284	L1
Denver Broncos	4	10	0	.286	1–5	196	381	L2

Note: Tie games were not officially counted in the standings in the AFL.
