= 1966 Oakland Raiders season =

AFL team season

- Owner: F. Wayne Valley
- General manager: Scotty Stirling
- Head coach: John Rauch
- Home stadium: Oakland–Alameda County Coliseum

Results
- Record: 8–5–1
- Division place: 2nd AFL Western
- Playoffs: Did not qualify

The 1966 Oakland Raiders season was their seventh season in Oakland and in the American Football League. Led by first-year head coach John Rauch, the Raiders played their home games in the new Oakland–Alameda County Coliseum, and finished at 8–5–1, second place in the Western division.

In April 1966, AFL commissioner Joe Foss resigned and was succeeded by Al Davis, the head coach and general manager of the Raiders. Offensive backs coach Rauch was promoted to head coach and Scotty Stirling became the general manager. After the AFL–NFL merger agreement in June was made without his involvement, Davis resigned in late July; he returned to the team, but did not coach again.

== Personnel ==
=== Staff / Coaches ===
1966 Oakland Raiders staff
| Front office: Majority Co-Owner - F. Wayne Valley; Minority Co-Owner/General Manager - Al Davis; Minority Co-Owner - Ed McGah; President / Managing General Partner / General Manager – Al Davis; Senior Executive – John Herrera; Head coaches: Head coach – John Rauch; Offensive coaches: Offensive Backs – Bill Walsh; Offensive line – Ollie Spencer | Defensive coaches: Defensive line – Tom Dahms; Defensive Backfield – Charlie Sumner; Special teams coaches: Special teams – John Rauch; Strength and conditioning: Trainer - George Anderson |

=== Roster ===
1966 Oakland Raiders roster
| Quarterbacks (QB): 19 Cotton Davidson; 15 Tom Flores; 12 Charlie Green; Running backs (RB): 39 Pervis Atkins; 40 Pete Banaszak; 36 Clem Daniels; 35 Hewritt Dixon; 30 Roger Hagberg; Wide receivers (WR): 89 Bill Miller; 84 Art Powell; 22 Larry Todd; Tight ends (TE): 33 Billy Cannon; 82 Tom Mitchell | Offensive linemen (OL): 70 Jim Harvey G; 65 Wayne Hawkins G; 73 Greg Kent T; 78 Rex Mirich T; 00 Jim Otto C; 68 Palmer Pyle G; 79 Harry Schuh T; 76 Bob Svihus T; Defensive linemen (DL): 53 Dan Birdwell DT; 83 Ben Davidson DE; 74 Tom Keating DT; 77 Ike Lassiter DE; 85 Carleton Oats DE; 75 Dave Daniels DT | Linebackers (LB): 48 Bill Budness MLB; 55 Dan Conners MLB; 32 Rich Jackson OLB; 42 Bill Laskey OLB; 34 Gus Otto OLB; 31 Ray Schmautz OLB; Defensive backs (DB): 21 Rodger Bird FS; 45 Dave Grayson CB; 27 Joe Krakoski SS; 47 Kent McCloughan CB; 20 Warren Powers SS; 29 Howie Williams FS; Special teams (ST): 11 Mike Eischeid K/P | Practice squad: 71 Dick Tyson G; Reserve: 14 Fred Biletnikoff WR (IR); -- George Flint G (IR); -- Dick Hermann LB (IR); 86 Ken Herock TE (Left squad); 49 Willie Williams CB (IR); 52 J. R. Williamson LB (IR); Rookies in italics |

== Schedule ==
| Week | Date | Opponent | Result | Record | Venue | Attendance | Recap |
|---|---|---|---|---|---|---|---|
| 1 | September 2 | at Miami Dolphins | **W** 23–14 | 1–0 | Miami Orange Bowl | 26,776 | Recap |
| 2 | September 10 | at Houston Oilers | **L** 0–31 | 1–1 | Rice Stadium | 31,763 | Recap |
| 3 | September 18 | **Kansas City Chiefs** | **L** 10–32 | 1–2 | Oakland–Alameda County Coliseum | 50,746 | Recap |
| 4 | September 25 | **San Diego Chargers** | **L** 20–29 | 1–3 | Oakland–Alameda County Coliseum | 37,183 | Recap |
| 5 | Bye | | | | | | |
| 6 | October 9 | Miami Dolphins | **W** 21–10 | 2–3 | Oakland–Alameda County Coliseum | 30,787 | Recap |
| 7 | October 16 | at **Kansas City Chiefs** | **W** 34–13 | 3–3 | Municipal Stadium | 33,057 | Recap |
| 8 | October 23 | at New York Jets | **W** 24–21 | 4–3 | Shea Stadium | 58,135 | Recap |
| 9 | October 30 | at Boston Patriots | **L** 21–24 | 4–4 | Fenway Park | 26,941 | Recap |
| 10 | November 6 | Houston Oilers | **W** 38–23 | 5–4 | Oakland–Alameda County Coliseum | 34,102 | Recap |
| 11 | November 13 | at **San Diego Chargers** | **W** 41–19 | 6–4 | Balboa Stadium | 26,230 | Recap |
| 12 | November 20 | at **Denver Broncos** | **W** 17–3 | 7–4 | Bears Stadium | 26,703 | Recap |
| 13 | November 24 | Buffalo Bills | **L** 10–31 | 7–5 | Oakland–Alameda County Coliseum | 36,781 | Recap |
| 14 | December 3 | New York Jets | **T** 28–28 | 7–5–1 | Oakland–Alameda County Coliseum | 32,144 | Recap |
| 15 | December 11 | **Denver Broncos** | **W** 28–10 | 8–5–1 | Oakland–Alameda County Coliseum | 31,765 | Recap |
| 16 | Bye | | | | | | |
Note: Intra-division opponents are in **bold** text.

== Standings ==
AFL Western Division
| | W | L | T | PCT | DIV | PF | PA | STK |
|---|---|---|---|---|---|---|---|---|
| Kansas City Chiefs | 11 | 2 | 1 | .846 | 5–1 | 448 | 276 | W3 |
| Oakland Raiders | 8 | 5 | 1 | .615 | 4–2 | 315 | 288 | W1 |
| San Diego Chargers | 7 | 6 | 1 | .538 | 2–4 | 335 | 284 | L1 |
| Denver Broncos | 4 | 10 | 0 | .286 | 1–5 | 196 | 381 | L2 |

Note: Tie games were not officially counted in the standings in the AFL.
