= Willie Mitchell (American football) =

American football player (born 1940)

No. 22
- Position: Cornerback

Personal information
- Born: August 28, 1940 (age 86); San Antonio, Texas, U.S.
- Listed height: 6 ft 0 in (1.83 m)
- Listed weight: 185 lb (84 kg)

Career information
- High school: Wheatley (San Antonio, Texas)
- College: Tennessee State
- NFL draft: 1964: undrafted

Career history
- Kansas City Chiefs (1964–1970); Houston Oilers (1971)

Awards and highlights
- Super Bowl champion (IV)
- Stats at Pro Football Reference

Willie Mitchell (born August 28, 1940) is a former professional football cornerback who played eight professional seasons 1964-1971. After winning the League Championship with the American Football League (AFL)'s Kansas City Chiefs in 1966, he started for them in the first AFL-NFL World Championship Game, and was on the Chiefs team that won the 1969 AFL Championship and then defeated the NFL's heavily favored Minnesota Vikings in the fourth and final AFL-NFL World Championship Game.

== See also ==
- Other American Football League players
