= 1966 Boston Patriots season =

Season of American Football League team the Boston Patriots

- Owner: Billy Sullivan
- Head coach: Mike Holovak
- Home stadium: Fenway Park

Results
- Record: 8–4–2
- Division place: 2nd AFL Eastern
- Playoffs: Did not qualify
- AFL All-Stars: DT Houston Antwine; LB Nick Buoniconti; WR/K Gino Cappelletti; DE Larry Eisenhauer; DT Jim Lee Hunt; C Jon Morris; FB Jim Nance; T Tom Neville; QB Babe Parilli; DB Chuck Shonta; G Len St. Jean

Uniform

The 1966 Boston Patriots season was the franchise's seventh season in the American Football League. The Patriots ended the season with a record of eight wins and four losses and two ties, and finished second in the AFL's Eastern Division. This would be the last winning season the Patriots posted as an AFL team; they would not have another such season until 1976, by which time the team was in the NFL as the New England Patriots.

== Staff ==
1966 Boston Patriots staff
Front office: President – Billy Sullivan; Head coaches: Head coach – Mike Holovak; Offensive coaches: Offensive line – Art Spinney	Defensive coaches: Defensive line – Jesse Richardson; Linebackers – Rommie Loudd; Defensive backfield/defensive line – Chuck Weber

== Game-by-game results ==
Week	Date	Opponent	Result	Record	Venue	Attendance	Recap
1	Bye						
2	September 10	at San Diego Chargers	**L** 0–24	0–1	Balboa Stadium	29,539	Recap
3	September 18	at Denver Broncos	**W** 24–10	1–1	Bears Stadium	25,337	Recap
4	September 25	Kansas City Chiefs	**L** 24–43	1–2	Fenway Park	22,641	Recap
5	October 2	**New York Jets**	**T** 24–24	1–2–1	Fenway Park	27,255	Recap
6	October 8	at **Buffalo Bills**	**W** 20–10	2–2–1	War Memorial Stadium	45,542	Recap
7	Bye						
8	October 23	San Diego Chargers	**W** 35–17	3–2–1	Fenway Park	32,371	Recap
9	October 30	Oakland Raiders	**W** 24–21	4–2–1	Fenway Park	26,941	Recap
10	November 6	Denver Broncos	**L** 10–17	4–3–1	Fenway Park	18,154	Recap
11	November 13	**Houston Oilers**	**W** 27–21	5–3–1	Fenway Park	23,426	Recap
12	November 20	at Kansas City Chiefs	**T** 27–27	5–3–2	Municipal Stadium	41,475	Recap
13	November 27	at **Miami Dolphins**	**W** 20–14	6–3–2	Miami Orange Bowl	22,754	Recap
14	December 4	**Buffalo Bills**	**W** 14–3	7–3–2	Fenway Park	39,350	Recap
15	December 11	at **Houston Oilers**	**W** 38–14	8–3–2	Rice Stadium	17,100	Recap
16	December 17	at **New York Jets**	**L** 28–38	8–4–2	Shea Stadium	58,921	Recap
Note: Intra-division opponents are in **bold** text.

== Standings ==
AFL Eastern Division
	W	L	T	PCT	DIV	PF	PA	STK
Buffalo Bills	9	4	1	.692	6–2	358	255	W1
Boston Patriots	8	4	2	.667	5–1–1	315	283	L1
New York Jets	6	6	2	.500	4–3–1	322	312	W1
Houston Oilers	3	11	0	.214	1–7	335	396	L8
Miami Dolphins	3	11	0	.214	2–5	213	362	W1

Note: Tie games were not officially counted in the standings in the AFL.

== Roster ==
1966 Boston Patriots roster
Quarterbacks (QB): 7 John Huarte; 15 Babe Parilli; Running backs (RB): 33 Bob Cappadona; 32 J.D. Garrett; 40 Larry Garron; 35 Jim Nance; Wide receivers (WR): 27 Joe Bellino; 20 Gino Cappelletti K; 81 Jim Colclough; 84 Art Graham; Tight ends (TE): 86 Tony Romeo; 82 Jim Whalen	Offensive linemen (OL): 63 Justin Canale G; 76 Charlie Long G; 56 Jon Morris C; 77 Tom Neville T; 71 Don Oakes T; 68 Karl Singer T; 60 Len St. Jean G; Defensive linemen (DL): 65 Houston Antwine DT; 89 Bob Dee DE; 72 Larry Eisenhauer DE; 79 Jim Lee Hunt DT; 73 Ed Khayat DT/DE; 74 John Mangum DT	Linebackers (LB): 53 Tom Addison OLB; 85 Nick Buoniconti MLB; 55 Lonnie Farmer OLB; 51 Jim Fraser OLB/P; 58 Doug Satcher OLB; Defensive backs (DB): 21 Jay Cunningham CB; 24 Dick Felt CB; 44 White Graves FS; 23 Ron Hall SS; 30 Tom Hennessey CB; 47 Bill Johnson SS; 31 Vic Purvis FS; 34 Chuck Shonta FS; 42 Don Webb CB; Special teams (ST): 14 Tom Yewcic P	Practice squad: 64 Dick Arrington G; 78 Jim Boudreaux T; Reserve: 38 Ellis Johnson RB (IR); Rookies in italics

== Notes and references ==
- "1960 Boston Patriots". Football @ JT-SW.com. John Troan. 2002. Archived from the original on April 25, 2007.. For game-by-game results
- "1960 Boston Patriots Roster". Football @ JT-SW.com. John Troan. 2002.. For team roster
- "New England Patriots (1960–present)". Sports E-cyclopedia. Tank Productions. 2007. Archived from the original on April 17, 2007.. For season summary
