= Elijah Pitts =

American football player (1938–1998)

No. 22
- Position: Halfback

Personal information
- Born: February 3, 1938; Mayflower, Arkansas, U.S.
- Died: July 10, 1998 (aged 60); Buffalo, New York, U.S.
- Listed height: 6 ft 1 in (1.85 m)
- Listed weight: 204 lb (93 kg)

Career information
- High school: Pine Street (Conway, Arkansas)
- College: Philander Smith
- NFL draft: 1961: 13th round, 180th overall pick

Career history

Playing
- Green Bay Packers (1961–1969); Los Angeles Rams (1970); New Orleans Saints (1970); Green Bay Packers (1971)

Coaching
- Los Angeles Rams (1974–1977) Running backs coach; Buffalo Bills (1978–1980) Running backs coach; Houston Oilers (1981–1983) Running backs coach; Hamilton Tiger-Cats (1984) Running backs coach; Buffalo Bills (1985–1991) Running backs coach; Buffalo Bills (1992–1997) Assistant head coach/running backs coach

Awards and highlights
- 2× Super Bowl champion (1966, 1967); 5× NFL champion (1961, 1962, 1965, 1966, 1967); Green Bay Packers Hall of Fame

Career NFL statistics
- Rushing yards: 1,788
- Rushing average: 3.5
- Receptions: 104
- Receiving yards: 1,245
- Total touchdowns: 35
- Stats at Pro Football Reference

Elijah Eugene Pitts (February 3, 1938 – July 10, 1998) was an American professional football player who was a halfback in the National Football League (NFL) for 11 seasons, including 10 with the Green Bay Packers. Late in his career, he briefly played for the Los Angeles Rams and New Orleans Saints. Pitts was an assistant coach in the league for over two decades, most notably as the assistant head coach of the Buffalo Bills.

== Early life ==
Born in Mayflower, Arkansas, Pitts' father was a sharecropper. He played high school football at segregated Pine Street High School in Conway, and also in the marching band at halftime. Pitts had offers from Big Ten programs and notable black colleges, but chose to stay close to home and played college football at Philander Smith College in Little Rock, where his older brother and former coach were. His cousin, Eugene Pitt, was the leader of The Jive Five

== Playing career ==
Pitts was selected by the Packers in the 13th round of the 1961 NFL draft, 180th overall. He turned down a higher offer from the Boston Patriots of the AFL to play for a better team in the more established league. A reserve for much of his early career behind hall of famer Paul Hornung, he saw his most action for the Packers in 1966, and scored two touchdowns in the first Super Bowl.

In January 1970, after Lombardi's departure from the team, Pitts, Lee Roy Caffey, and Bob Hyland were traded to the Chicago Bears for the second overall pick in the 1970 NFL draft. At age 32, he was cut by the Bears and played for the Rams and Saints in 1970, then returned to Green Bay for a final season in 1971 with first-year head coach Dan Devine.

Pitts was a member of all five NFL championship teams under head coach Vince Lombardi, including wins in the first two Super Bowls. He was inducted into the Green Bay Packers Hall of Fame in 1979.

== Coaching career ==
After his playing career ended, Pitts was a scout for two seasons in Green Bay under Devine. He became an assistant coach for the Rams under head coach Chuck Knox in 1974, filling a running backs vacancy left by Dick Vermeil's departure to UCLA. Pitts went with Knox to the Buffalo Bills in 1978, then left for the Houston Oilers in 1981, on first-year head coach Ed Biles' staff, coaching hall of fame back Earl Campbell. After Biles was fired in 1983, Pitts spent a season in Canada with the Hamilton Tiger-Cats in 1984 with head coach Al Bruno.

Pitts returned to the Bills in 1985 under head coach Kay Stephenson and was retained by new coaches Hank Bullough and Marv Levy in 1986. He became assistant head coach in 1992, coached in all four of the Bills' Super Bowl appearances in the early 1990s, and substituted as head coach for Levy for three games in the 1995 season.

== Death ==
In October 1997, Pitts was diagnosed with stomach cancer while he was still the Bills' assistant head coach. The disease claimed his life nine months later; he was 60 years old. Pitts was survived by his wife, two sons, and a daughter.

Pitts' elder son Ron (b. 1962) was an NFL defensive back in the late 1980s with the Bills and Packers, and is currently a sportscaster for CBS Sports Network.

== See also ==
- Elijah Pitts Award
- Ron Pitts (son)
