= Fred Arbanas =

American football player and politician (1939–2021)

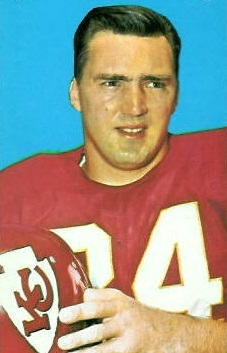
- Arbanas on a 1965 Topps football card

No. 84
- Position: Tight end

Personal information
- Born: January 14, 1939; Detroit, Michigan, U.S.
- Died: April 16, 2021 (aged 82); Kansas City, Missouri, U.S.
- Listed height: 6 ft 3 in (1.91 m)
- Listed weight: 240 lb (109 kg)

Career information
- High school: St. Mary of Redford (Detroit)
- College: Michigan State
- NFL draft: 1961: 2nd round, 22nd overall pick
- AFL draft: 1961: 7th round, 53rd overall pick

Career history
- Dallas Texans / Kansas City Chiefs (1962–1970)

Awards and highlights
- Super Bowl champion (IV); 3× AFL champion (1962, 1966, 1969); 6× All-AFL (1962–1967); 5× AFL All-Star (1962–1965, 1967); AFL All-Time Team; Kansas City Chiefs Hall of Honor; Missouri Sports Hall of Fame; Michigan Sports Hall of Fame

Career NFL/AFL statistics
- Receptions: 198
- Receiving yards: 3,101
- Receiving touchdowns: 34
- Stats at Pro Football Reference

Frederick Vincent "Fritz" Arbanas (January 14, 1939 – April 16, 2021) was an American professional football tight end. He played college football for the Michigan State Spartans. Arbanas was drafted in the second round (22nd overall) in the 1961 NFL draft by the St. Louis Cardinals and in the seventh round (53rd overall) of the 1961 AFL draft by the Dallas Texans. He would spend his entire career with the Texans/Chiefs. Following his retirement he served as a legislator in Jackson County, Missouri. Arbanas served as acting Jackson County Executive from January 5 to 11.

== Early life ==
Arbanas was born and raised in Detroit. He attended St. Mary's of Redford High School. He was a two-way player and played college football at Michigan State University. As a sophomore in 1958, he scored his first touchdown reception against California. His biggest offensive game came during his junior season in a win over Notre Dame, when he caught four passes for 67 yards, including a 59-yard touchdown. As a senior, he was primarily known for his play on defense. He only caught three passes that year, but two were for touchdowns. Just as his first reception was for a touchdown, so was his last in 1960, in the season finale against the University of Detroit Titans.

Arbanas earned a Bachelor of Science degree in education from Michigan State.

== Professional career ==
Arbanas was drafted by the American Football League's Dallas Texans (later the Kansas City Chiefs) in the seventh round (54th overall) of the 1961 AFL draft and by the National Football League's St. Louis Cardinals in the second round (22nd) overall in the 1961 NFL draft.

He signed with the Texans for the 1961 season, but he missed that season due to ruptured disks in his back. However, beginning the following year he would not miss a game for eight consecutive seasons.

Arbanas was selected by his peers as The Sporting News' All-AFL tight end in 1963, 1964, and 1966. He was an American Football League Western Division All-Star in 1962, 1963, and 1964.

His fourth season, 1964, was his most productive with 34 receptions for 686 yards (a 20.2 average) and eight touchdowns — all career bests — as he was an AFL All-Star for the third time.

However, 1964 also marked a turning point in his life when, in December, he was brutally attacked by two men on a Kansas City sidewalk. He lost sight in one eye in January 1965, causing him to miss the AFL All-Star game. He was again a Western All-Star in 1965, 1966 (when he did not play due to injury), and 1967.

Arbanas starred for two Chiefs Super Bowl teams and one World Championship team. He earned a Super Bowl ring when the Chiefs defeated the Minnesota Vikings 23–7, in Super Bowl IV, the last meeting between AFL-NFL rivals before the two leagues merged.

Arbanas used the playing field to write a legacy for the AFL. "I remember when the Chiefs played the Chicago Bears the summer after the loss to Green Bay in the first Super Bowl", team owner Lamar Hunt said. "We won the pre-season game 66–24, but there was a lot at stake in that game. I heard Fred say that was his most memorable game, and I feel the same way."

Arbanas retired from pro football after the 1970 season in which he appeared in six games for the Chiefs.

Arbanas was the AFL's prototype tight end. His 198 receptions and 3,101 receiving yards were Chiefs records for a tight end until they were broken by Tony Gonzalez.

His talents would eventually earn a spot on the All-time All-AFL Team. He was inducted into the Kansas City Chiefs Hall of Honor in 1973. He was named to the Missouri Sports Hall of Fame in 1997. He was inducted into the Michigan Sports Hall of Fame in 2012.

== NFL/AFL career statistics ==
Legend
	Won the Super Bowl
	Won the AFL championship
**Bold**	Career high

=== Regular season ===
Year	Team	Games		Receiving				
Year	Team	GP	GS	Rec	Yds	Avg	Lng	TD
1962	DTX	14	13	29	469	16.2	47	6
1963	KAN	14	14	**34**	373	11.0	40	6
1964	KAN	14	13	**34**	**686**	**20.2**	59	**8**
1965	KAN	14	14	24	418	17.4	**67**	4
1966	KAN	14	14	22	305	13.9	36	4
1967	KAN	14	14	20	295	14.8	43	5
1968	KAN	14	14	11	189	17.2	48	0
1969	KAN	14	14	16	258	16.1	44	0
1970	KAN	6	6	8	108	13.5	26	1
Career		118	116	198	3,101	15.7	67	34

=== Playoffs ===
Year	Team	Games		Receiving				
Year	Team	GP	GS	Rec	Yds	Avg	Lng	TD
1962	DTX	1	1	2	21	10.5	12	0
1966	KAN	2	2	**4**	**74**	**18.5**	**29**	**1**
1968	KAN	1	1	0	0	0.0	0	0
1969	KAN	3	3	3	49	16.3	27	0
Career		7	7	9	144	16.0	29	1

== Personal life ==
During his career with the Chiefs, Arbanas held a full-time position with Fordyce Material and later with Kansas City Coca-Cola Bottling Company as Promotion Director.

He was a member of the board of directors for North American Savings Bank. He retired from Fred Arbanas, Inc. which was founded in 1970.

He was a longtime Jackson County, Missouri legislator beginning in 1973 and four-time Chairman of the Legislature (1974, 1975, 1988, and 1989). In recognition of his many years of service to Jackson County, in 1999 the Longview Lake Golf Course was renamed Fred Arbanas Golf Course at Longview Lake. On January 22, 2013, Arbanas' legislative colleagues presented him with a 40-year service pin.

In 1992, he ran in the Democratic primary against incumbent U.S. Congressman Alan Wheat, but Wheat won with 58.2 percent of the vote to Arbanas' 37.5 percent.

Arbanas lived with his wife Sharon Arbanas in Lee's Summit, Missouri. He had four children and eight grandchildren. Fred served on the Jackson County Legislature in Kansas City, Missouri, and began serving as Temporary County Executive on January 4, 2016. He has also had a golf course named after him.

Arbanas died on April 16, 2021.

== See also ==
- List of American Football League players
