= 1966 Buffalo Bills season =

7th season in franchise history

- Owner: Ralph Wilson
- Head coach: Joe Collier
- Home stadium: War Memorial Stadium

Results
- Record: 9–4–1
- Division place: 1st AFL Eastern
- Playoffs: Lost AFL Championship (vs. Chiefs) 7–31

The 1966 Buffalo Bills season was the team’s seventh season in the American Football League. It was the first season for head coach Joe Collier, who had been the Bills' defensive coordinator for the previous four seasons.It ended with a 31–7 loss in the AFL Championship Game to the Kansas City Chiefs, ending the team's two-year reign as league champions.

The Bills allowed the fewest points in the AFL for the third consecutive year. Although defensive tackle Tom Sestak hampered by a bad knee, defensive linemen Jim Dunaway and Ron McDole took a leadership position. Linebackers Mike Stratton, Harry Jacobs and John Tracey, and defensive backs George Saimes, Butch Byrd, Hagood Clarke and Tom Janik provided a strong defensive foundation.

Halfback Bobby Burnett and split end Bobby Crockett joined long-time Bills running back Wray Carlton and quarterback Jack Kemp, leading Buffalo's offense to scoring 358 points, second-most in the AFL in 1966. Burnett's 1,185 total yards from scrimmage were 5th in the AFL, and garnered AFL Rookie of the Year honors for Burnett.

== Offseason ==
Lou Saban, who had coached the Bills to consecutive AFL Championships, left the team after the 1965 season to coach at the University of Maryland.

== Personnel ==
=== Staff ===
1966 Buffalo Bills staff
Front office: President/owner – Ralph Wilson; Vice-president/minority owner – Pat McGroder; Head coaches: Head coach – Joe Collier; Offensive coaches: Running backs/wide receivers – John Mazur; Offensive line – Jerry Smith	Defensive coaches: Linebackers/Defensive Backs – Richie McCabe

=== Final roster ===
1966 Buffalo Bills roster
Quarterbacks: 15 Jack Kemp; 12 Daryle Lamonica; Running backs: 21 Bobby Burnett; 30 Wray Carlton; 34 Allen Smith; 23 Jack Spikes; Wide receivers: 85 Glenn Bass; 83 Bobby Crockett; 44 Elbert Dubenion; 40 Ed Rutkowski; Tight ends: 82 Paul Costa; 80 Charley Ferguson	Offensive linemen: 77 Stew Barber T; 50 Al Bemiller C; 71 Wayne DeSutter T; 79 Dick Hudson T; 67 Joe O'Donnell G; 65 Remi Prudhomme G; 57 Bob Schmidt C; 66 Billy Shaw G; Defensive linemen: 73 Dave Costa DT; 88 Tom Day DE; 78 Jim Dunaway DT; 72 Ron McDole DE; 75 Dudley Meredith DT/DE; 70 Tom Sestak DT	Linebackers: 59 Paul Guidry OLB; 64 Harry Jacobs MLB; 56 Marty Schottenheimer MLB; 58 Mike Stratton OLB; 51 John Tracey OLB; Defensive backs: 42 Butch Byrd CB; 45 Hagood Clarke SS; 24 Booker Edgerson CB; 27 Tom Janik CB; 47 Charlie King CB/S; 26 George Saimes FS; 22 Charley Warner CB/S; Special teams: 49 Booth Lusteg K; 55 Paul Maguire P	Taxi squad: 35 Doug Goodwin RB; -- Mailon Kent QB; 46 Tony King S; 48 Greg Lashutka TE; 48 Pete Mills WR; Reserve List: 33 Teddy Bailey RB (IR); 60 Dave Behrman C (IR)
Note: rookies in italics

== Regular season ==
=== Season schedule ===
Week	Date	Opponent	Result	Record	Venue	Attendance	Recap
1	September 4	at San Diego Chargers	**L** 7–27	0–1	Balboa Stadium	27,572	Recap
2	September 11	Kansas City Chiefs	**L** 20–42	0–2	War Memorial Stadium	42,023	Recap
3	September 18	**Miami Dolphins**	**W** 58–24	1–2	War Memorial Stadium	37,546	Recap
4	September 25	**Houston Oilers**	**W** 27–20	2–2	War Memorial Stadium	42,256	Recap
5	October 2	at Kansas City Chiefs	**W** 29–14	3–2	Municipal Stadium	43,885	Recap
6	October 8	**Boston Patriots**	**L** 10–20	3–3	War Memorial Stadium	45,542	Recap
7	October 16	San Diego Chargers	**T** 17–17	3–3–1	War Memorial Stadium	45,169	Recap
8	Bye						
9	October 30	at **New York Jets**	**W** 33–23	4–3–1	Shea Stadium	61,552	Recap
10	November 6	at **Miami Dolphins**	**W** 29–0	5–3–1	Miami Orange Bowl	37,177	Recap
11	November 13	**New York Jets**	**W** 14–3	6–3–1	War Memorial Stadium	45,738	Recap
12	November 20	at **Houston Oilers**	**W** 42–20	7–3–1	Rice Stadium	27,312	Recap
13	November 24	at Oakland Raiders	**W** 31–10	8–3–1	Oakland–Alameda County Coliseum	36,781	Recap
14	December 4	at **Boston Patriots**	**L** 3–14	8–4–1	Fenway Park	39,350	Recap
15	Bye						
16	December 18	Denver Broncos	**W** 38–21	9–4–1	War Memorial Stadium	40,583	Recap
Note: Intra-division opponents are in **bold** text.

== Standings ==
AFL Eastern Division
	W	L	T	PCT	DIV	PF	PA	STK
Buffalo Bills	9	4	1	.692	6–2	358	255	W1
Boston Patriots	8	4	2	.667	5–1–1	315	283	L1
New York Jets	6	6	2	.500	4–3–1	322	312	W1
Houston Oilers	3	11	0	.214	1–7	335	396	L8
Miami Dolphins	3	11	0	.214	2–5	213	362	W1

Note: Tie games were not officially counted in the standings in the AFL.

=== Game summaries ===
==== Week 3 ====
Team	1	2	3	4	Total
Dolphins	3	7	0	14	24
• Bills	21	27	3	7	58

- Date: September 18
- Location: War Memorial Stadium, Buffalo, NY
- Game weather: 61 °F (16 °C); wind 3 mph

Scoring summary
Q1	BUF	Kemp 1 yard run (Lusteg kick)	BUF 7–0
Q1	BUF	Byrd 60 yard interception return (Lusteg kick)	BUF 14–0
Q1	BUF	Byrd 72 yard punt return (Lusteg kick)	BUF 21–0
Q1	MIA	Mingo 24 yard field goal	BUF 21–3
Q2	BUF	Crockett 26 yard pass from Kemp (Lusteg kick)	BUF 28–3
Q2	BUF	Burnett 1 yard run (Lusteg kick)	BUF 35–3
Q2	BUF	Burnett 3 yard run (kick failed)	BUF 41–3
Q2	MIA	Roderick 4 yard pass from Wilson (Mingo kick)	BUF 41–10
Q2	BUF	Spikes 11 yard run (Lusteg kick)	BUF 48–10
Q3	BUF	Lusteg 13 yard field goal	BUF 51–10
Q4	MIA	Roberson 66 yard pass from Wilson (Mingo kick)	BUF 51–17
Q4	BUF	Spikes 18 yard pass from Lamonica (Lusteg kick)	BUF 58–17
Q4	MIA	Kocourek 13 yard pass from Wilson (Mingo kick)	BUF 58–24

==== Week 10 ====
Team	1	2	3	4	Total
Jets	0	0	3	0	3
• Bills	0	0	0	14	14

- Date: November 13
- Location: War Memorial Stadium, Buffalo, New York
- Game attendance: 45,738
- Game weather: 33 °F (1 °C); wind 10 mph

Scoring summary
Q3	NYJ	Jim Turner 43 yard field goal	NYJ 3–0
Q4	BUF	Elbert Dubenion 14 yard pass from Jack Kemp (Booth Lusteg kick)	BUF 7–3
Q4	BUF	Jim Dunaway 72 yard blocked field goal return (Booth Lusteg kick)	BUF 14–3

=== Roster ===
Buffalo Bills roster
Quarterbacks: - Daryle Lamonica; 15 Jack Kemp; Running backs Wide receivers Tight ends	Offensive linemen Defensive linemen Defensive backs Special teams K-Booth Lusteg

== Postseason ==
=== AFL Championship Game ===
	1	2	3	4	Total
Chiefs	7	10	0	14	31
Bills	7	0	0	0	7

Kansas City Chiefs 31, Buffalo Bills 7

January 1, 1967, at War Memorial Stadium, Buffalo, New York
Attendance: 42,080

The Bills entered the AFL championship game seeking their third consecutive title. Though the game was played in Buffalo, the visiting Kansas City Chiefs were three-point favorites, mainly because of their explosive and innovative offense led by head coach Hank Stram. The Bills were a more conventional team with a solid defensive line and a running mindset on offense.

Buffalo found no offensive rhythm in the second half, and the Chiefs closed the game out in the fourth quarter with Dawson found Chris Burford for a 45-yard gain, setting up a one-foot touchdown run by rookie Mike Garrett. Less than two minutes later, Garrett scored a second touchdown following another Bills fumble.

Scoring

- KC – Arbanas 29 pass from Dawson (Mercer kick) 7-0
- BUF – Dubenion 69 pass from Kemp (Lusteg kick) 7-7
- KC – Taylor 29 pass from Dawson (Mercer kick) 14-7
- KC – Field goal Mercer 32 17-7
- KC – Garrett 1 run (Mercer kick) 24-7
- KC – Garrett 18 run (Mercer kick) 31-7

== Awards and records ==
- Bobby Burnett, Rookie of the Year
