= Dick Hudson (American football, born 1940) =

American football player (1940–2016)

No. 79
- Position: Offensive tackle

Personal information
- Born: July 30, 1940; Memphis, Tennessee, U.S.
- Died: March 2, 2016 (aged 75); Paris, Tennessee, U.S.

Career information
- College: Memphis State
- AFL draft: 1962: 2nd round, 16th overall pick

Career history
- San Diego Chargers (1962); Buffalo Bills (1963–1967)

Awards and highlights
- 2× AFL Champion (1964, 1965); Bills' All-1960s (AFL) Team; AFL All-Star: 1965
- Stats at Pro Football Reference

Richard Smith "Bill" Hudson (July 30, 1940 – March 2, 2016) was an American football player who was a starting offensive lineman at Memphis State University for four years. In 1961, he was a second-round draft pick by the American Football League's San Diego Chargers.

Traded to the AFL's Buffalo Bills in 1963, he was a part of the 1964 and 1965 AFL Championship teams. Hudson was an AFL Eastern Division All-Star in 1965 and in 1970 was named to the Buffalo Bills Team of the 1960s Decade.

Retiring from pro football, he returned to Paris, Tennessee and served as assistant and head coach of the Henry County High School Patriots football team and vice principal of the high school.

== See also ==
- List of American Football League players
