= War Memorial Stadium (Buffalo, New York) =

Former sports stadium in Buffalo, New York

- "The Rockpile"
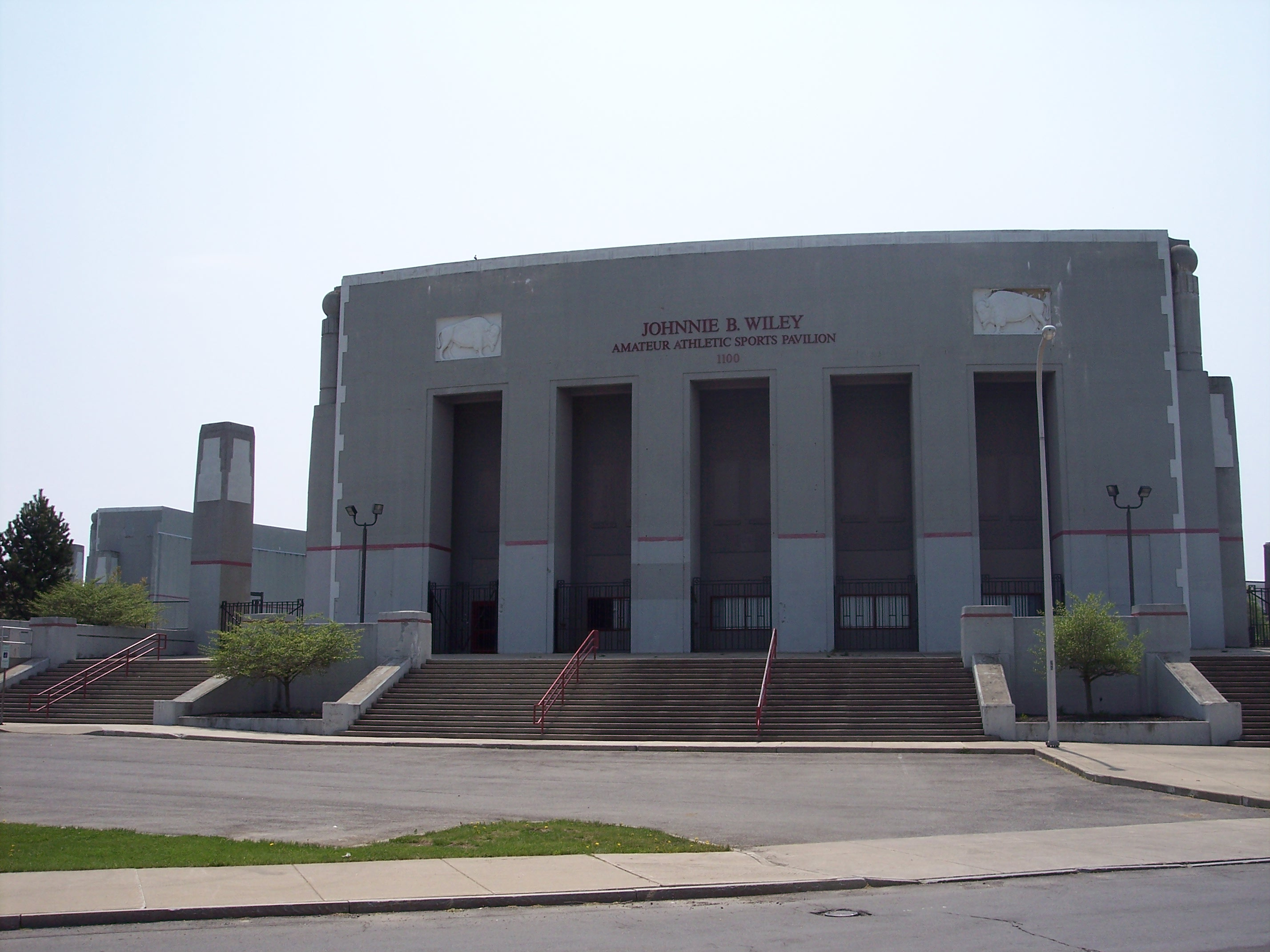
- Preserved main entrance (left field corner) in 2011

- Location in the United States Location in New York
- Interactive map of War Memorial Stadium
- Former names: Roesch Memorial Stadium (1937); Grover Cleveland Stadium (1937–1938); Civic Stadium (1938–1960)
- Address: 285 Dodge Street
- Location: Buffalo, New York, U.S.
- Coordinates: 42.905°N 78.856°W
- Elevation: 650 ft (200 m) AMSL
- Owner: City of Buffalo
- Operator: City of Buffalo
- Capacity: 1,882 (since 1992); 46,206 (1965–1989); 36,500 (1937–1964)
- Surface: Natural grass
- Record attendance: 50,988; Bennett vs. Kensington, October 21, 1948
- Field size: Left field: 330 ft (101 m); Left-center: 362 ft (110 m); Center field: 420 ft (128 m); Right-center: 333 ft (101 m); Right field: 310 ft (94 m); Backstop: 50 ft (15 m)

Construction
- Groundbreaking: 1935
- Opened: October 16, 1937; 89 years ago
- Renovated: 1960
- Expanded: 1965
- Closed: May 5, 1989; 37 years ago
- Demolished: 1989
- Cost: $3 million ($67.2 million in 2025 dollars)

Tenants
- Canisius Golden Griffins (NCAA); 1937–1949, 1978–1988; Buffalo Indians-Tigers (AFL) 1940–1941; Buffalo Bills (AAFC) 1946–1949; Buffalo Bulls (NCAA) 1946–1954; Buffalo Bills (AFL/NFL) 1960–1972; Buffalo Bisons (IL) 1961–1970; Buffalo White Eagles (ECPSL) 1962; Buffalo Blazers (NSL) 1976–1980; Buffalo Bisons (EL/AA) 1979–1987; Canisius Golden Griffins (NCAA) 1979–1989

War Memorial Stadium, colloquially known as The Rockpile, was an outdoor football, baseball and soccer stadium in Buffalo, New York. Opened in 1937 as Roesch Memorial Stadium, the venue was later known as Grover Cleveland Stadium and Civic Stadium. The stadium was home to the Canisius Golden Griffins football and baseball (NCAA), Buffalo Bulls football (NCAA), Buffalo Indians-Tigers (AFL), Buffalo Bills (AAFC), Buffalo Bills (AFL/NFL), Buffalo Bisons (IL), Buffalo White Eagles (ECPSL), Buffalo Blazers (NSL), and Buffalo Bisons (EL/AA). It also had a race track and hosted several NASCAR events. The venue was demolished in 1989 and replaced with the Johnnie B. Wiley Amateur Athletic Sports Pavilion, which retains entrances from the original stadium.

== History ==
=== Planning and construction ===
The stadium was built on the East Side of Buffalo for $3 million as a Works Progress Administration project in 1937. It was built on a large, rectangular block that had once housed the Prospect Reservoir.

=== Opening and reception ===
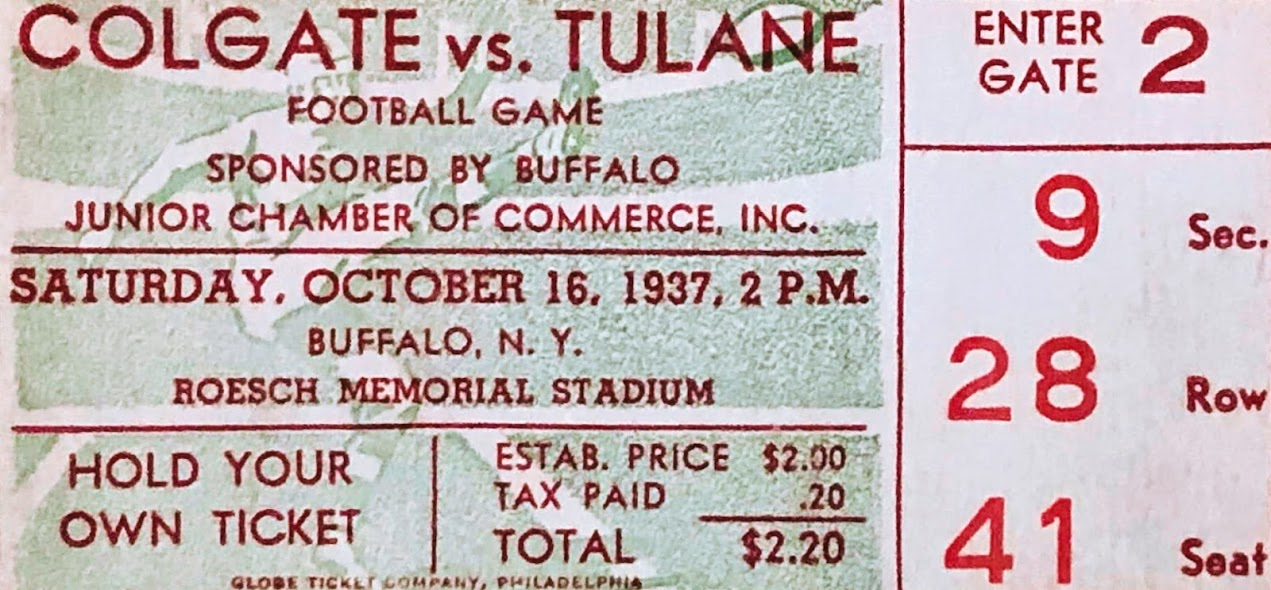
Ticket from the venue's inaugural event, October 1937

The 36,500-seat venue was primarily used for college football when it opened on October 16, 1937, with the Tulane Green Wave defeating the Colgate Raiders 7–6 in the inaugural game. The name changed several times in its first two years of operation, first being named after Republican Charlie Roesch, then for Democrat Grover Cleveland, before settling on the nonpartisan Civic Stadium. Professional football returned to Buffalo on September 16, 1938 when the Philadelphia Eagles defeated the Pittsburgh Pirates in front of 19,746 fans in a neutral site regular season match-up. The Buffalo Indians-Tigers became the venue's first professional football team in 1940.

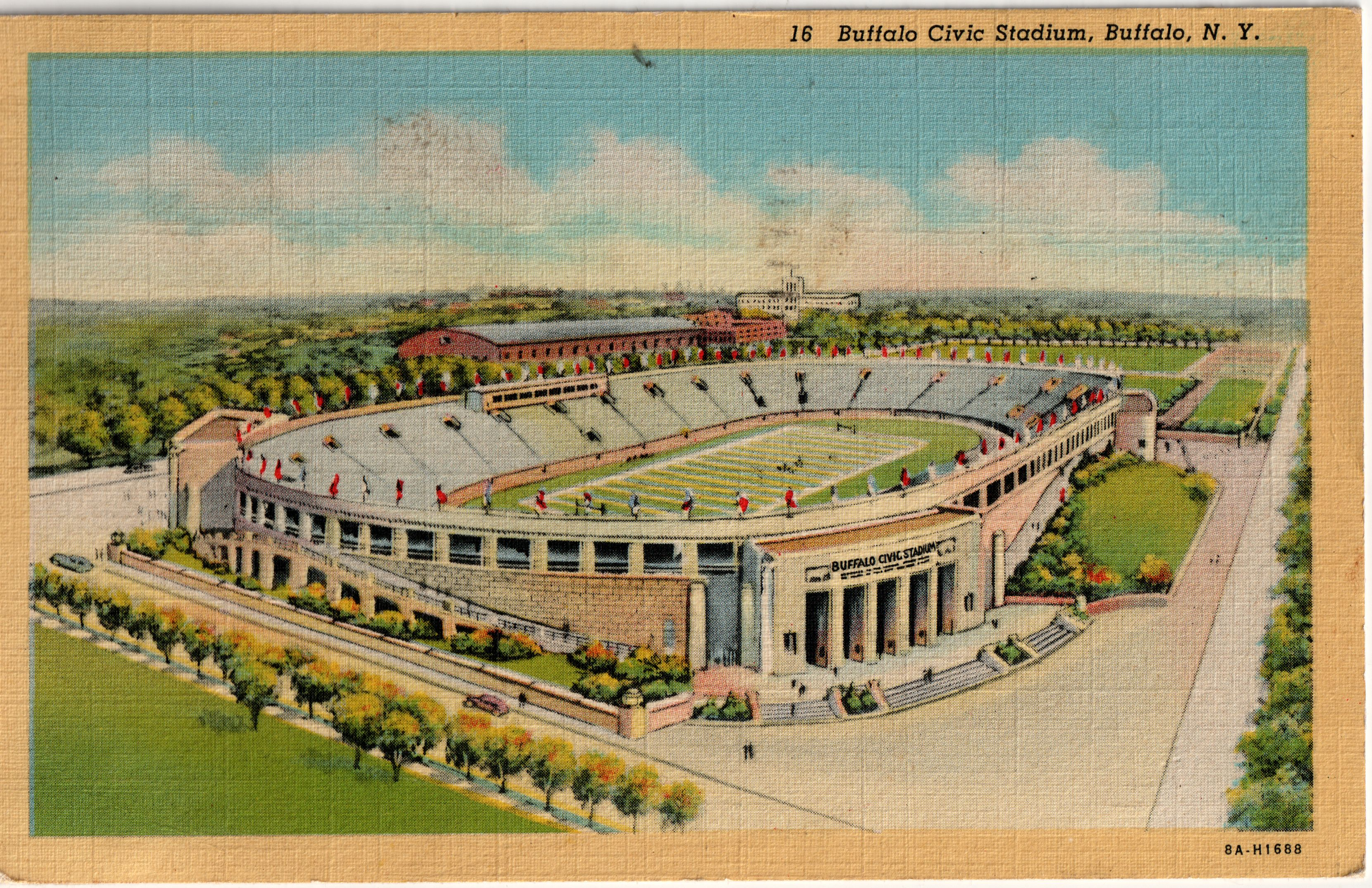
Buffalo Civic Stadium in the 1940s

=== Alterations ===
A quarter-mile cinder oval race track was added to the interior perimeter of the venue in 1940 for auto racing. Both midget car racing and stock car racing were popular at the venue, attracting NASCAR events in 1956 and 1958. Because of the small size of the track, drivers were forced to leave the venue to make pit stops at nearby Masten Armory. Racing fans were also forbidden from sitting in the first five rows of the venue for safety reasons.

Buffalo was awarded an expansion franchise by the Continental League of Major League Baseball in January 1960 and made plans to play at the venue beginning with the 1961 season. However, the league folded before the season began. The Buffalo Bisons remained in the International League and began play at the newly renamed War Memorial Stadium in 1961, as their previous home of Offermann Stadium had already been slated for demolition.

The venue's race track was removed in 1960 so that the stadium could accommodate both baseball and football for the Buffalo Bisons and the Buffalo Bills. The stadium's baseball diamond had an unorthodox southeast alignment (home plate to center field). The east-west alignment of the football field was also unorthodox, running along the third base line.

The stadium was expanded to hold 46,306 fans in 1965.

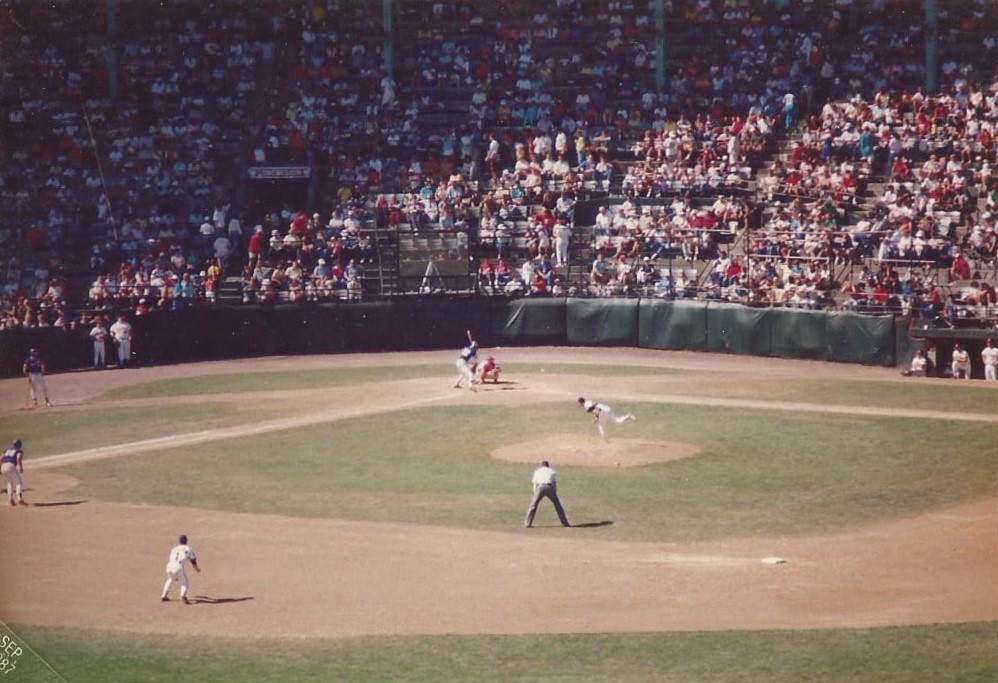
Final Buffalo Bisons game at the venue against the Nashville Sounds, August 30, 1987

The venue was poorly maintained, lending to its nickname of "The Rockpile". Brock Yates of Sports Illustrated jokingly wrote in 1969 that it looked "as if whatever war it was a memorial to had been fought within its confines."

While the Buffalo Bills were popular and regularly filled the venue, the team struggled to attract stadium-filling crowds. The Bisons moved mid-season in 1970 and became the Winnipeg Whips.

The stadium was deemed unsuitable for National Football League play after the AFL–NFL merger, as it sat fewer than the combined league's 50,000 seat requirement for venues and was unable to be expanded. Rich Stadium was constructed for the Bills in suburban Orchard Park, where the team moved after the 1972 season.

The venue sat vacant until 1976, when the Buffalo Blazers of the National Soccer League began play. A new Buffalo Bisons franchise was founded in 1979 that returned baseball to the venue. That same year, Canisius College signed a 10-year agreement to use the venue for its college events.

The major movie The Natural was filmed at the venue in 1983.

=== Closing and demolition ===
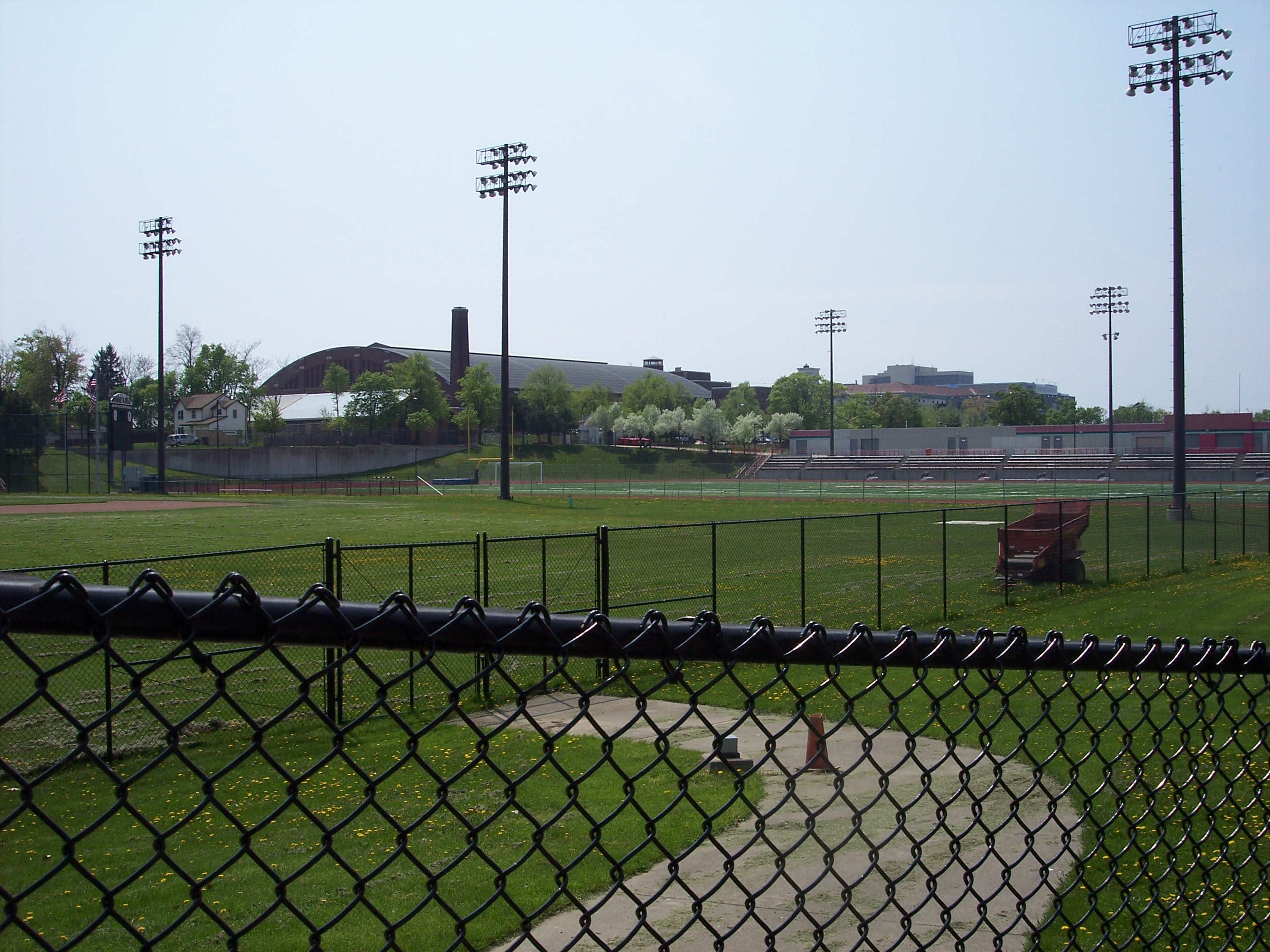
Johnnie B. Wiley Amateur Athletic Sports Pavilion

The Bisons moved to newly constructed Pilot Field following the 1987 season. The final event at the venue saw the Akron Zips defeat the Canisius Golden Griffins 11–2 on May 6, 1989. Canisius moved its football and baseball teams to the newly built Demske Sports Complex.

War Memorial Stadium was demolished in 1989 and replaced with the Johnnie B. Wiley Amateur Athletic Sports Pavilion, a high school athletic field. Built in 1992 for $6.8 million, the complex incorporates the original entrances from War Memorial Stadium. It was previously home to the Buffalo Gladiators, an amateur football team.

The original flag pole from center field at War Memorial Stadium was preserved and installed at Pilot Field (now known as Sahlen field) in July 1990, where it stands to this day.

== Notable events ==
A painting of Billy Shaw and the 1964 Buffalo Bills

=== Football ===
A preseason neutral site Canadian Football League game between the Hamilton Tiger-Cats and the Toronto Argonauts took place at the venue on August 11, 1951. Hamilton defeated Toronto by a score of 17–11.

The venue was host to the Coaches All-America Game from 1961 to 1965. Originally called the Graduation Bowl in its inaugural year, the game was an exhibition between the best college seniors in America who were turning professional.

The stadium hosted three postseason American Football League games:

- 1963 AFL Eastern Division playoff: Boston Patriots defeated the Buffalo Bills 26–8 on December 28, 1963
- 1964 AFL Championship Game: Buffalo Bills defeated the San Diego Chargers 20–7 on December 26, 1964
- 1966 AFL Championship Game: Kansas City Chiefs defeated the Buffalo Bills 31–7 on January 1, 1967

=== Baseball ===
The stadium hosted two Major League Baseball exhibitions:

- International League All-Stars defeated the New York Yankees 5–0 on August 19, 1963
- Cleveland Indians and Toronto Blue Jays played to an 8–8 tie on April 5, 1987

A touring Old-Timers' Game staged Buffalo's Grand Old Game at the venue on June 23, 1984. The American League All-Stars defeated the National League All-Stars 6–1.

=== NASCAR ===
The stadium hosted two NASCAR events:

- NASCAR Convertible Division event on July 7, 1956, won by Joe Weatherly
- NASCAR Grand National event on July 19, 1958, won by Jim Reed

== In media ==
The 1984 film The Natural was filmed at War Memorial Stadium, with it representing the home ballpark of the fictional New York Knights.

== See also ==
- Buffalo Memorial Auditorium

Events and tenants
Preceded by Canisius Stadium	Home of the Canisius Golden Griffins; 1937 – 1949; 1978 – 1988	Succeeded by Demske Sports Complex
Preceded by Inaugural	Home of the Buffalo Indians-Tigers; 1940 – 1941	Succeeded by –
Preceded by Inaugural	Home of the Buffalo Bills; 1946 – 1949	Succeeded by –
Preceded by Rotary Field	Home of the Buffalo Bulls; 1946 – 1954	Succeeded by Rotary Field
Preceded by Inaugural	Home of the Buffalo Bills; 1960 – 1972	Succeeded by Rich Stadium
Preceded by Inaugural	Host of the Coaches All-America Game; 1961 – 1965	Succeeded by Atlanta Stadium
Preceded by Offermann Stadium	Home of the Buffalo Bisons; 1961 – 1970	Succeeded by –
Preceded by Inaugural	Home of the Buffalo White Eagles; 1962	Succeeded by –
Preceded by Inaugural	Home of the Buffalo Blazers; 1976 – 1980	Succeeded by –
Preceded by Inaugural	Home of the Buffalo Bisons; 1979 – 1987	Succeeded by Pilot Field
Preceded by Cazenovia Park	Home of the Canisius Golden Griffins; 1979 – 1989	Succeeded by Demske Sports Complex
