= 1965 Denver Broncos season =

American football team season

- Head coach: Mac Speedie
- Home stadium: Bears Stadium

Results
- Record: 4–10
- Division place: 4th AFL Western
- Playoffs: Did not qualify

The 1965 Denver Broncos season was the sixth season for the team in the American Football League (AFL). The team improved slightly from the previous two seasons with a record of four wins, and ten losses. With a victory at Boston, they ended a 17-game winless streak on the road. They finished last in the AFL's Western Division.

== Personnel ==
=== Staff ===
1965 Denver Broncos staff
Front office: Team Owner / Chairman of the Board – Gerald Phipps; Team President – Allan R Phipps; Executive Vice President – James H Burris; Director of Player Personnel – Fred Gehrke; Head coaches: Head Coach – Mac Speedie; Offensive coaches: Offensive Backfield – Bus Mertes; Offensive Line – Red Miller	Defensive coaches: Defensive Line – Ray Malavasi; Defensive Backfield – George Dickson

=== Roster ===
1965 Denver Broncos roster
Quarterbacks (QB): 15 Jacky Lee; 10 John McCormick; 14 Mickey Slaughter; Running backs (RB): 40 Paul Carmichael; 2 Cookie Gilchrist; 29 Wendell Hayes; 28 Abner Haynes; 26 Darrell Lester; Wide receivers (WR): 42 Odell Barry; 88 Al Denson; 82 Bob Scarpitto P; 87 Lionel Taylor; Tight ends (TE): 30 Hewritt Dixon	Offensive linemen (OL): 74 Lee Bernet T; 76 Bob Breitenstein T; 75 Eldon Danenhauer T; 64 Jon Hohman G; 52 Ray Kubala C; 67 Bob McCullough G; 60 Charlie Parker G; 72 Jerry Sturm G; Defensive linemen (DL): 80 Ed Cooke DE; 83 Ray Jacobs DT; 70 Charlie Janerette DT; 81 Max Leetzow DE; 78 Leroy Moore DE; 68 Tom Nomina DT; 77 Jim Thompson DT	Linebackers (LB): 56 John Bramlett OLB; 54 Ed Cummings MLB; 53 Tom Erlandson OLB; 50 Jerry Hopkins MLB; 51 Gene Jeter OLB; 63 Jim Thibert OLB; Defensive backs (DB): 24 Willie Brown CB; 21 Gerry Bussell CB/S; 23 Goose Gonsoulin FS; 46 John Griffin CB; 47 John McGeever SS; 45 Jim McMillin FS; 48 Nemiah Wilson CB; Special teams (ST): 7 Gary Kroner K	Reserve: 27 Charlie Mitchell RB (IR); Rookies in italics

== Regular season ==
Week	Date	Opponent	Result	Record	Venue	Attendance	Recap
1	September 11	at **San Diego Chargers**	**L** 31–34	0–1	Balboa Stadium	27,022	Recap
2	September 19	Buffalo Bills	**L** 15–30	0–2	Bears Stadium	30,682	Recap
3	September 24	at Boston Patriots	**W** 27–10	1–2	Fenway Park	26,782	Recap
4	October 3	New York Jets	**W** 16–13	2–2	Bears Stadium	34,988	Recap
5	October 10	**Kansas City Chiefs**	**L** 23–31	2–3	Bears Stadium	31,001	Recap
6	October 17	Houston Oilers	**W** 28–17	3–3	Bears Stadium	32,492	Recap
7	October 24	at Buffalo Bills	**L** 13–31	3–4	War Memorial Stadium	45,046	Recap
8	October 31	at New York Jets	**L** 10–45	3–5	Shea Stadium	53,717	Recap
9	November 7	**San Diego Chargers**	**L** 21–35	3–6	Bears Stadium	33,073	Recap
10	November 14	at Houston Oilers	**W** 31–21	4–6	Rice Stadium	28,126	Recap
11	November 21	**Oakland Raiders**	**L** 20–28	4–7	Bears Stadium	30,369	Recap
12	Bye						
13	December 5	at **Oakland Raiders**	**L** 13–24	4–8	Frank Youell Field	19,023	Recap
14	December 12	Boston Patriots	**L** 20–28	4–9	Bears Stadium	27,207	Recap
15	December 19	at **Kansas City Chiefs**	**L** 35–45	4–10	Municipal Stadium	14,421	Recap
Note: Intra-division opponents are in **bold** text.

== Standings ==
AFL Western Division
	W	L	T	PCT	DIV	PF	PA	STK
San Diego Chargers	9	2	3	.818	4–1–1	340	227	W3
Oakland Raiders	8	5	1	.615	3–3	298	239	L1
Kansas City Chiefs	7	5	2	.583	4–1–1	322	285	W1
Denver Broncos	4	10	0	.286	0–6	303	392	L4

Note: Tie games were not officially counted in the standings in the AFL.
