= 1965 American Football League draft =

American Football League draft

1965 AFL draft

General information
- Date: November 28, 1964

Overview
- 160 (regular draft) + 96 (red shirt draft) total selections in 20 (regular draft) + 12 (red shirt draft) rounds
- League: AFL
- First selection: Joe Namath, QB; New York Jets
- Mr. Irrelevant: John Henry, DT; Buffalo Bills
- Hall of Famers: 4

The 1965 American Football League draft took place on November 28, 1964. Held via telephone conference call, it remained the only draft in major professional football history to be held without a central location until the 2020 NFL draft. The NFL draft was held the same day.

With the first overall pick, the New York Jets selected quarterback Joe Namath.

== Player selections ==
= AFL All-Star	= Hall of Famer

=== Round 1 ===
Pick	Team	Player	Position	College
1	New York Jets	Joe Namath	Quarterback	Alabama
3	Oakland Raiders	Harry Schuh	Defensive tackle	Memphis State
4	New York Jets (from Denver)	Tom Nowatzke	Fullback	Indiana
5	Kansas City Chiefs	Gale Sayers	Running back	Kansas
6	San Diego Chargers	Steve DeLong	Defensive end	Tennessee
7	Boston Patriots	Jerry Rush	Defensive tackle	Michigan State
8	Buffalo Bills	Jim Davidson	Tackle	Ohio State

=== Round 2 ===
Pick	Team	Player	Position	College
9	Denver Broncos	Dick Butkus	Linebacker	Illinois
10	Houston Oilers	Malcolm Walker	Center	Rice
11	Oakland Raiders	Fred Biletnikoff	Wide receiver	Florida State
12	New York Jets	John Huarte	Quarterback	Notre Dame
13	Kansas City Chiefs	Jack Chapple	Linebacker	Stanford
14	San Diego Chargers	Roy Jefferson	Linebacker	Utah
15	Houston Oilers (from Boston)	Ralph Neely	Tackle	Oklahoma
16	Kansas City Chiefs (from Buffalo)	Ronnie Caveness	Linebacker	Arkansas

=== Round 3 ===
Pick	Team	Player	Position	College
17	Denver Broncos	Glenn Ressler	Offensive guard	Penn State
18	Houston Oilers	Ernie Koy	Running back	Texas
19	Oakland Raiders	Bob Svihus	Defensive tackle	USC
20	New York Jets	Verlon Biggs	Defensive end	Jackson State
21	Kansas City Chiefs	Mike Curtis	Linebacker	Duke
22	San Diego Chargers	Allen Brown	Tight end	Mississippi
23	Boston Patriots	Jim Whalen	Tackle	Boston College
24	Buffalo Bills	Al Atkinson	Linebacker	Villanova

=== Round 4 ===
Pick	Team	Player	Position	College
25	Denver Broncos	George Donnelly	Defensive back	Illinois
26	Houston Oilers	Bobby Maples	Center	Baylor
27	Oakland Raiders	Gus Otto	Linebacker	Missouri
28	New York Jets	Bob Schweickert	Quarterback	Virginia Tech
29	Kansas City Chiefs	Otis Taylor	Linebacker	Prairie View A&M
30	San Diego Chargers	Steve Tensi	Quarterback	Florida State
31	Boston Patriots	Ellis Johnson	Halfback	Southeastern Louisiana
32	Kansas City Chiefs (from Buffalo)	Frank Pitts	Wide receiver	Saginaw Valley State

=== Round 5 ===
Pick	Team	Player	Position	College
33	Denver Broncos	Bob Breitenstein	Tackle	Tulsa
34	Houston Oilers	Frank Molden	Defensive tackle	Jackson State
35	Denver Broncos (from Oakland)	Max Leetzow	Defensive end	Idaho
36	New York Jets	Glenn Sasser	Defensive end	North Carolina State
37	Kansas City Chiefs	Smith Reed	Halfback	Alcorn State
38	San Diego Chargers	Rick Redman	Linebacker	Washington
39	Boston Patriots	Corwyn Aldredge	End	Northwestern State
40	Buffalo Bills	Dave Simmons	Linebacker	Georgia Tech

=== Round 6 ===
Pick	Team	Player	Position	College
41	Denver Broncos	Tom Wilhelm	Tackle	Syracuse
42	Houston Oilers	Dennis Murphy	Defensive tackle	Florida
43	Houston Oilers (from Oakland)	Russell Wayt	Linebacker	Rice
44	New York Jets	Don Hoovler	Linebacker	Ohio
45	Kansas City Chiefs	John Wilbur	Offensive guard	Stanford
46	San Diego Chargers	Will Beasley	Fullback	North Carolina A&T
47	Boston Patriots	Justin Canale	Offensive guard	Mississippi State
48	Buffalo Bills	Lance Rentzel	Wide receiver	Oklahoma

=== Round 7 ===
Pick	Team	Player	Position	College
49	Denver Broncos	Jim Garcia	Defensive end	Purdue
50	Kansas City Chiefs (from Houston)	Gloster Richardson	Wide receiver	Jackson State
51	New York Jets (from Oakland)	Archie Roberts	Quarterback	Columbia
52	New York Jets	Jim Harris, Jr.	Defensive tackle	Utah State
53	Kansas City Chiefs	Lou Bobich	Defensive back	Michigan State
54	San Diego Chargers	Jack Snow	Wide receiver	Notre Dame
55	Boston Patriots	Tom Neville	Defensive tackle	Mississippi State
56	Buffalo Bills	Marty Schottenheimer	Linebacker	Pittsburgh

=== Round 8 ===
Pick	Team	Player	Position	College
57	Denver Broncos	Jon Hohman	Offensive guard	Wisconsin
58	Houston Oilers	Ray Ogden	Tight end	Alabama
59	Houston Oilers (from Oakland)	Roy Hilton	Defensive end	Jackson State
60	New York Jets	Rick McCurdy	Defensive end	Oklahoma
61	Kansas City Chiefs	Danny Thomas	Quarterback	SMU
62	San Diego Chargers	Clancy Williams	Defensive back	Washington State
63	Boston Patriots	Fred Brown	Defensive tackle	Miami (FL)
64	Buffalo Bills	Ray Rissmiller	Offensive tackle	Georgia

=== Round 9 ===
Pick	Team	Player	Position	College
65	Denver Broncos	Gerry Bussell	Defensive back	Georgia Tech
66	Houston Oilers	George Kinney	Defensive end	Wiley
67	Oakland Raiders	Rich Zecher	Defensive tackle	Utah State
68	New York Jets	Jimmy Sidle	Running back	Auburn
69	Kansas City Chiefs	Joe Cerne	Center	Northwestern
70	San Diego Chargers	Jerry Whelchel	Quarterback	Massachusetts
71	Boston Patriots	Bob Malone	Tackle	Louisiana Tech
72	Buffalo Bills	Al Nelson	Defensive back	Cincinnati

=== Round 10 ===
Pick	Team	Player	Position	College
73	Denver Broncos	Gene Jeter	Linebacker	Texas Southern
74	Houston Oilers	Maxie Williams	Offensive guard	Southeastern Louisiana
75	Oakland Raiders	Craig Morton	Quarterback	California
76	New York Jets	Frank Lambert	Punter	Mississippi
77	Kansas City Chiefs	Bob Howard	Defensive back	Stanford
78	San Diego Chargers	Gene Foster	Running back	Arizona State
79	Buffalo Bills (Boston Patriots)	Chuck Mercein	Running back	Yale
80	Buffalo Bills	Floyd Hudlow	Defensive back	Arizona

=== Round 11 ===
Pick	Team	Player	Position	College
81	Denver Broncos	Tom Vaughn	Defensive back	Iowa State
82	Houston Oilers	Kent McCloughan	Cornerback	Nebraska
83	Oakland Raiders	Bill Minor	Linebacker	Illinois
84	New York Jets	Jim Gray	Defensive back	Toledo
85	Kansas City Chiefs	Al Piraino	Tackle	Wisconsin
86	San Diego Chargers	Veran Smith	Guard	Utah State
87	Boston Patriots	John Frechette	Tackle	Boston College
88	Buffalo Bills	Doug Goodwin	Running back	Maryland Eastern Shore

=== Round 12 ===
Pick	Team	Player	Position	College
89	Denver Broncos	Tom Myers	Quarterback	Northwestern
90	Houston Oilers	Bob Reed	Guard	Tennessee State
91	Buffalo Bills (from Oakland)	Chuck Hurston	Defensive end	Auburn
92	New York Jets	John Berrington	Linebacker	Iowa State
93	Kansas City Chiefs	Mike Cox	Linebacker	Iowa State
94	San Diego Chargers	Jim Allison	Running back	San Diego State
95	Boston Patriots	Jim Weatherly	Defensive back	Mississippi
96	Buffalo Bills	Pete Mills	Wide receiver	Wichita State

=== Round 13 ===
Pick	Team	Player	Position	College
97	Denver Broncos	Mike Strofolino	Linebacker	Villanova
98	Houston Oilers	Bobby Felts	Halfback	Florida A&M
99	Oakland Raiders	Wally Mahle	Defensive back	Syracuse
100	New York Jets	Sonny Utz	Fullback	Virginia Tech
101	Kansas City Chiefs	Bob Bonds	Defensive back	San Jose State
102	San Diego Chargers	Bill Quigley	Linebacker	Villanova
103	Boston Patriots	Charlie Green	Quarterback	Wittenberg
104	Buffalo Bills	Bob Timberlake	Kicker	Michigan

=== Round 14 ===
Pick	Team	Player	Position	College
105	Denver Broncos	John Frick	Offensive guard	Ohio
106	Houston Oilers	Norm Evans	Defensive tackle	TCU
107	Oakland Raiders	Loren Hawley	Defensive back	California
108	New York Jets	Gary Plumlee	Defensive tackle	New Mexico
109	Kansas City Chiefs	Fred Dotson	Defensive back	Wiley
110	San Diego Chargers	Don Floyd	End	Florida State
111	Boston Patriots	Jay Cunningham	Defensive back	Bowling Green
112	Buffalo Bills	Lyn Hart	Defensive back	Virginia State

=== Round 15 ===
Pick	Team	Player	Position	College
113	Denver Broncos	Jeff Jordan	Defensive back	Tulsa
114	Houston Oilers	Tony Guillory	Linebacker	Lamar
115	Oakland Raiders	Bill Cronin	Tight end	Boston College
116	New York Jets	Jim Burt	Defensive back	Western Kentucky
117	Kansas City Chiefs	Dave Powless	Offensive guard	Illinois
118	San Diego Chargers	Mike Howell	Defensive back	Grambling State
119	Boston Patriots	Ted Rodosovich	Offensive guard	Cincinnati
120	Buffalo Bills	John Meyer	Linebacker	Notre Dame

=== Round 16 ===
Pick	Team	Player	Position	College
121	Denver Broncos	Brian Schweda	Defensive end	Kansas
122	Houston Oilers	Junior Coffey	Running back	Washington
123	Oakland Raiders	Fred Hill	Tight end	USC
124	New York Jets	Seth Cartwright	Defensive tackle	Prairie View A&M
125	Kansas City Chiefs	Stan Irvine	Tackle	Colorado
126	San Diego Chargers	John Godden	Linebacker	San Diego State
127	Boston Patriots	George Pyne III	Defensive tackle	Olivet
128	Buffalo Bills	Bruce Airheart	Halfback	North Dakota State

=== Round 17 ===
Pick	Team	Player	Position	College
129	Denver Broncos	John Fouse	End	Arizona
130	Houston Oilers	Jim Grisham	Fullback	Oklahoma
131	Oakland Raiders	Garry Porterfield	Defensive end	Tulsa
132	New York Jets	Charlie Browning	Halfback	Washington
133	Kansas City Chiefs	Don Croftcheck	Offensive guard	Indiana
134	San Diego Chargers	Leon Hardy	Tackle	Texas Southern
135	Boston Patriots	White Graves	Defensive back	LSU
136	Buffalo Bills	John Henderson	Wide receiver	Michigan

=== Round 18 ===
Pick	Team	Player	Position	College
137	Boston Patriots	David Lee	End	Louisiana Tech
138	Houston Oilers	Russ Mundy	Halfback	West Texas A&M
139	Oakland Raiders	John Dugan	Tackle	Holy Cross
140	New York Jets	Larry Dupree	Halfback	Florida
141	Kansas City Chiefs	Jerry Smith	Tight end	Arizona State
142	San Diego Chargers	Bob Evans	Defensive end	Texas A&M
143	Boston Patriots	Ed Meixler	Linebacker	Boston University
144	Buffalo Bills	Ray Hinze	Tackle	Texas A&M

=== Round 19 ===
Pick	Team	Player	Position	College
145	Denver Broncos	Ron Oelschlager	Halfback	Kansas
146	Houston Oilers	Frank Fox	Tackle	Sam Houston State
147	Oakland Raiders	Frank McClendon	Tackle	Alabama
148	New York Jets	Mitch Dudek	Tackle	Xavier
149	Kansas City Chiefs	Mike Alford	Center	Auburn
150	San Diego Chargers	Braden Beck	Kicker	Stanford
151	Boston Patriots	Jim Nance	Running back	Syracuse
152	Buffalo Bills	Frank Marchlewski	Center	Minnesota

=== Round 20 ===
Pick	Team	Player	Position	College
153	Denver Broncos	Terry Metchner	Offensive guard	Albion
154	Houston Oilers	Gus Brezina	Offensive guard	Houston
155	Oakland Raiders	Bo Scott	Running back	Ohio State
156	New York Jets	Troy Allen	Defensive back	Western Michigan
157	Kansas City Chiefs	Bill Symons	Halfback	Colorado
158	San Diego Chargers	Jack Edwards	Center	Florida State
159	Boston Patriots	Fred Fugazzi	Fullback	Missouri Valley
160	Buffalo Bills	John Henry	Defensive tackle	Boston University

== Red shirt draft ==
=== Red shirt round one ===
Pick #	NFL team	Player	Position	College
1	Houston Oilers	Donny Anderson	Halfback	Texas Tech
2	Denver Broncos	Miller Farr	Halfback	Wichita State
3	Oakland Raiders	Larry Todd	Halfback	Arizona State
4	New York Jets	Johnny Roland	Halfback	Missouri
5	Kansas City Chiefs	Al Dotson	Tackle	Grambling State
6	San Diego Chargers	Gary Garrison	End	San Diego State
7	Boston Patriots	Dave McCormick	Tackle	Louisiana State
8	Buffalo Bills	Ken Ambrusko	Halfback	Maryland

=== Red shirt round two ===
Pick #	NFL team	Player	Position	College
9	Denver Broncos	Walter Johnson	Guard	Cal State Los Angeles
10	Houston Oilers	Glen Ray Hines	Tackle	Arkansas
11	Oakland Raiders	Jim Harvey	Tackle	Mississippi
12	New York Jets	John McGuire	Tight End - Defensive End	Syracuse
13	Kansas City Chiefs	Frank Cornish	Defensive Tackle	Grambling State
14	San Diego Chargers	Larry Martin	Tackle	San Diego State
15	Boston Patriots	Bob Kowalkowski	Tackle	Virginia
16	Buffalo Bills	Gary Lane	Quarterback	Missouri

=== Red shirt round three ===
Pick #	NFL team	Player	Position	College
17	Houston Oilers	Mike Shinn	Defensive End	Kansas
18	Denver Broncos	Marv Davis	Defensive End	Wichita State
19	Oakland Raiders	Steve Mass	Tackle	Arizona
20	New York Jets	Jimmy Heidel	Defensive Back	Mississippi
21	Kansas City Chiefs	Henry Carr	Halfback	Arizona State
22	San Diego Chargers	Stan Dzura	Tackle - Defensive End	California
23	Buffalo Bills	John Kuzniewski	Fullback	Purdue
24	Boston Patriots	Bob Cappadona	Fullback	Northeastern State

=== Red shirt round four ===
Pick #	NFL team	Player	Position	College
25	Denver Broncos	Barry Brown	End	Florida
26	Houston Oilers	Olie Cordill, Jr.	Quarterback	Memphis State
27	Oakland Raiders	Mickey Cox	Tackle	Louisiana State
28	New York Jets	Bob Werl	Defensive End	Miami
29	Kansas City Chiefs	Steve Cox	Tackle	South Carolina
30	San Diego Chargers	Doug Woodlief	Linebacker	Memphis State
31	Boston Patriots	Dick Arrington	Guard	Notre Dame
32	Buffalo Bills	Roger Davis	Halfback	Virginia

=== Red shirt round five ===
Pick #	NFL team	Player	Position	College
33	Houston Oilers	Jerry Crumpler	Tackle	Missouri
34	Denver Broncos	Mike Tilleman	Tackle	Montana
35	Oakland Raiders	Bob Taylor	Guard	Cincinnati
36	New York Jets	George Sauer	Flanker	Texas
37	Kansas City Chiefs	John Thomas	End	USC
38	San Diego Chargers	Jim Weatherwax	Tackle	Cal State Los Angeles
39	Boston Patriots	Dennis Smith	Defensive End	Cincinnati
40	Buffalo Bills	Johnny Boyette	Tackle	Clemson

=== Red shirt round six ===
Pick #	NFL team	Player	Position	College
41	Denver Broncos	Jerry Inman	Tackle	Oregon
42	Houston Oilers	Dave Daniels	Tackle	Florida A&M
43	Oakland Raiders	Greg Kent	Tackle	Utah
44	New York Jets	Dale Lindsey	Linebacker	Western Kentucky
45	Kansas City Chiefs	John Wilbur	Guard	Stanford
46	San Diego Chargers	Tom Good	Linebacker	Marshall
47	Boston Patriots	Billy Ezell	Defensive Back	Louisiana State
48	Buffalo Bills	John Strohmeyer	Defensive End	Nebraska

=== Red shirt round seven ===
Pick #	NFL team	Player	Position	College
49	Houston Oilers	Leo Lowery	Halfback	Texas Tech
50	Denver Broncos	Dave Tobey	Linebacker	Oregon
51	Oakland Raiders	John Carrell	Tackle	Texas Tech
52	New York Jets	Ron Barlow	Fullback	Kansas State
53	Kansas City Chiefs	Billy Moore	Halfback	Mississippi State
54	San Diego Chargers	Wayne Waff	End	East Tennessee State
55	Boston Patriots	John Hankinson	Quarterback	Minnesota
56	Buffalo Bills	J.R. Wilburn	End	South Carolina

=== Red shirt round eight ===
Pick #	NFL team	Player	Position	College
57	Denver Broncos	John Maddox	End	Mississippi
58	Houston Oilers	Len Sears	Tackle	South Carolina
59	Oakland Raiders	Henry Pickett	Halfback	Baylor
60	New York Jets	Bob Mallendick	Tackle	Hillsdale
61	Kansas City Chiefs	Roosevelt Ellerbe	Defensive Back	Iowa State
62	San Diego Chargers	Roy Shivers	Halfback	Utah State
63	Boston Patriots	Beau Colle	Defensive Back	Louisiana State
64	Buffalo Bills	Charley King	Defensive Back	Purdue

=== Red shirt round nine ===
Pick #	NFL team	Player	Position	College
65	Houston Oilers	Tom Bleick	Halfback	Georgia Tech
66	Denver Broncos	Phil Vandersea	Fullback	Massachusetts
67	Oakland Raiders	Frank Pennie	Tackle	Florida State
68	New York Jets	Rich Kotite	End	Wagner
69	Kansas City Chiefs	Bruce McLenna	Halfback	Hillsdale
70	San Diego Chargers	Tony Carey	Halfback	Notre Dame
71	Boston Patriots	Charlie Brown	Tackle	Tulsa
72	Buffalo Bills	Earl Hawkins	Halfback	Emory & Henry

=== Red shirt round ten ===
Pick #	NFL team	Player	Position	College
73	Denver Broncos	Merlin Walet	Fullback	McNeese State
74	Houston Oilers	George Haffner	Quarterback	McNeese State
75	Oakland Raiders	Brent Berry	Tackle	San Jose State
76	New York Jets	Dave Austin	End	Georgia Tech
77	Kansas City Chiefs	Chuck Drulis, Jr.	End	Duke
78	San Diego Chargers	Dave Plump	Halfback	Fresno State
79	Boston Patriots	Dave Hettema	Tackle	New Mexico
80	Buffalo Bills	Sonny Odom	Halfback	Duke

=== Red shirt round eleven ===
Pick #	NFL team	Player	Position	College
81	Houston Oilers	Billy Guy Anderson	Quarterback	Tulsa
82	Denver Broncos	Jerry Fishman	Linebacker	Maryland
83	Oakland Raiders	Tom Longo	Defensive Back	Notre Dame
84	New York Jets	Rich Marshall	Tackle	Stephen F. Austin
85	Kansas City Chiefs	Billy Scott	End	Northeastern State
86	San Diego Chargers	Jeff White	End	Texas Tech
87	Boston Patriots	Roy Schmidt	Guard	Long Beach State
88	Buffalo Bills	Ray Johnson	Guard	Prairie View A&M

=== Red shirt round twelve ===
Pick #	NFL team	Player	Position	College
89	Denver Broncos	Biff Bracy	Halfback	Duke
90	Houston Oilers	Harlan Lane	Flanker	Baylor
91	Oakland Raiders	Dennis Duncan	Halfback	Louisiana College
92	New York Jets	Pat Screen	Quarterback	Louisiana State
93	Kansas City Chiefs	Lonny Price	Halfback	Louisiana-Lafayette
94	San Diego Chargers	Mike Ciccolella	Linebacker	Dayton
95	Boston Patriots	Leon Standridge	End	San Diego State
96	Buffalo Bills	George Wilson	Quarterback	Xavier (OH)

== Notable undrafted players ==
^{†}	= AFL All-Star

Original NFL team	Player	Pos.	College	Notes
Buffalo Bills	Bill Laskey ^{†}	LB	Michigan	
Denver Broncos	John Bramlett ^{†}	LB	Memphis State	
Denver Broncos	Nemiah Wilson ^{†}	S	Grambling State	
Houston Oilers	Sammy Weir	WR	Arkansas State	
New York Jets	Jim Hudson	S	Texas	

== See also ==
- 1965 NFL draft
- List of American Football League players
- History of American Football League draft
- List of professional American football drafts
