= Pete Mills =

American football player (born 1942)

No. 48, 20, 42, 41
- Position: Flanker

Personal information
- Born: May 29, 1942; Calvert, Texas, U.S.
- Died: April 20, 2015
- Listed height: 5 ft 10 in (1.78 m)
- Listed weight: 185 lb (84 kg)

Career information
- High school: I.M. Terrell (Fort Worth, Texas)
- College: Coffeyville JC (1961–1962); Wichita State (1963–1964)
- AFL draft: 1965: 12th round, 96th overall pick

Career history
- Buffalo Bills (1965–1966); Denver Broncos (1967)*; Wheeling Ironmen (1967); Chicago Bears (1968)*; Ohio Valley Ironmen (1968–1969); Jersey Tigers (1970); Jersey Jays (1970); Bridgeport Jets (1971, 1973)
- * Offseason or practice squad member only

Awards and highlights
- AFL champion (1965); AFL All-Star (1965)
- Stats at Pro Football Reference

Sullivan "Pete" Mills Jr. (May 29, 1942 – April 20, 2015) was an American professional football player who was a flanker for two seasons with the Buffalo Bills of the American Football League (AFL). He was selected by the Bills in the 12th round of the 1965 AFL draft. He played college football at Coffeyville Junior College and Wichita State University.

== Early life ==
Sullivan Mills Jr. was born on May 29, 1942, in Calvert, Texas. He attended I.M. Terrell High School in Fort Worth, Texas. He participated in football, track, and basketball in high school. Mills earned all-state honors as a fullback in football.

== College career ==
Mills first played college football at Coffeyville Junior College from 1961 to 1962. He was elected treasurer of the freshman class at Coffeyville. He helped the team to a 9–2 record as a freshman and an 8–2 record as a sophomore, winning the conference title the latter year. Mills was also named a junior college All-American in 1962. He was inducted into the school's athletics hall of fame in 2001.

Mills then transferred to play for the Wichita State Shockers of Wichita State University from 1963 to 1964. He garnered all-conference recognition while at Wichita State.

== Professional career ==
Mills was selected by the Buffalo Bills in the 12th round, with the 96th overall pick, of the 1965 AFL draft. He played in two games for the Bills as a flanker in 1965, catching one pass for 43 yards. He spent part of the season on the taxi squad. Mills also played in the 1965 AFL Championship Game, a 23–0 victory over the San Diego Chargers. On January 15, 1966, the AFL champion Bills played a group of All-Stars in the 1966 AFL All-Star game. The Bills lost 30–19. Mills was released by the Bills on August 30, 1966. He appeared in one game for the Bills in 1966, returning four kicks for 76 yards. He spent part of the 1966 season on the taxi squad.

On January 23, 1967, it was announced that Mills had signed with the Denver Broncos. He was released later that year.

Mills played for the Wheeling Ironmen of the Continental Football League in 1967. He converted to cornerback while with the Ironman. He recorded two interceptions for four yards, one reception for 20 yards, 16 kickoff returns for 329 yards, and six punt returns for 26 yards during the 1967 season. Mills signed with the Chicago Bears of the NFL in 1968 but was later released. He then returned to play for the newly-renamed Ohio Valley Ironmen during the 1968 season and returned one interception for negative three yards. During his final year with the Ironmen in 1969, he accumulated six interceptions for 106 yards and one touchdown, one catch for 21 yards, and six kickoff returns for 127 yards.

Mills played for the Jersey Tigers of the Atlantic Coast Football League (ACFL) in 1970, recording one interception. He was also a member of the unrelated Jersey Jays of the ACFL during the 1970 season.

Mills was later a member of the ACFL's Bridgeport Jets in 1971 and 1973.

== Personal life ==
Mills was a high school teacher and football coach in New Jersey after his playing career. He later worked for the Buffalo, New York city government from 1977 until his retirement in 1998. He died on April 20, 2015.
