= Jerry Fishman =

American football player

No. 31
- Positions: Middle linebacker, tailback

Personal information
- Born: c. 1943

Career information
- High school: Norwalk High School (Connecticut) Norwalk (CT)
- College: Maryland
- NFL draft: 1965: 14th round, 196th overall pick
- AFL draft: 1965: 11th round, 81st overall pick

Career history
- Baltimore Colts (1965); Hartford Charter Oaks (1965); Washington Redskins (1966)

Awards and highlights
- First-team All-ACC (1964)

Jerry Fishman (born c. 1943) is an American former football player. He played college football for the Maryland Terrapins of the University of Maryland and was selected by the Baltimore Colts in the 1965 NFL draft. Fishman gained notoriety when he twice gave an obscene gesture during the 1964 Maryland–Navy game, which directly resulted in a 40-year hiatus of the series.

== Biography ==
Fishman attended Norwalk High School in Norwalk, Connecticut, where he played football and baseball. In 1960, he became the then second all-time single-game rusher in the state of Connecticut when he rushed for 342 yards against Danbury.

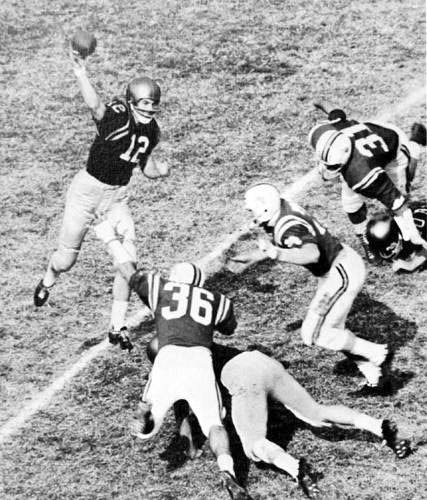
Fishman (#31) and others close in on Roger Staubach (#12) during the infamous 1964 Maryland–Navy game.

Fishman attended the University of Maryland where he played football primarily as a linebacker. He also served as a tailback, and in 1963 was the team's leading rusher with 480 yards on 116 carries. In 1964, he was named to the All-Atlantic Coast Conference (ACC) first-team as a guard.

Fishman gained notoriety and is most known for his actions in the 1964 game against the Naval Academy, an intense in-state rival. Rough play marked the game, and Fishman responded on two occasions with an extended middle-finger to taunts from the stands, some of which Maryland receiver Darryl Hill described as anti-Semitic. Afterward, with respect to his rough play, Navy head coach Wayne Hardin called Fishman, "a disgrace to the game." Maryland head coach Tom Nugent conceded that Fishman may have been "a little wild-eyed," but added, "I can't chastise him publicly. I didn't see him do anything deliberate." From the Pentagon, Navy officials cited Fishman's use of the middle finger as the main reason for their refusal to renew the series for 40 years. Several times, University of Maryland officials asked Fishman to apologize for the gesture, but he refused and said, "What for? It's a game. It's a silly game. It's football, it's not a diplomatic blunder."

Fishman was the only Jew on the team at the time, and became close friends with Darryl Hill after he transferred from Navy. Hill was the first black player on any ACC football team. Fishman said, "He being the only black and me being the only Jew, we used to call ourselves 'The Onlys.'" Shortly after Hill's arrival, Fishman cut a deal with Hill, offering to help him survive his redshirt season in exchange for tutoring in economics. Fishman was fiercely protective of his friend, Hill, who was the subject of mistreatment from the fans and opposing players. Against South Carolina, which had threatened a boycott of the game because of Hill's participation, Maryland led 13–0 at halftime. As the team walked to the locker room, a fan poured a drink onto Hill. Fishman responded by hitting the man with his helmet. At Wake Forest, Hill was knocked unconscious by a late hit, and Fishman applied the oxygen mask when the medics refused.

Fishman was selected in the 14th round (196th overall) of the 1965 NFL draft by the Baltimore Colts. The Colts waived him during the preseason camp, and in 1965, he instead played for the Hartford Charter Oaks in the Continental Football League. In June 1966, he was signed by the Washington Redskins, but did not make the roster. Fishman is now retired from personal injury law and currently resides in Boca Raton, Florida.
