= Crab Bowl Classic =

American college football rivalry

- Maryland Terrapins Navy Midshipmen
- First meeting: October 25, 1905; Navy 17, Maryland 0
- Latest meeting: September 6, 2010; Maryland 17, Navy 14
- Next meeting: TBA
- Trophy: The Crab Bowl

Statistics
- Total meetings: 21
- All-time series: Navy leads, 14–7
- Largest victory: Maryland: 38–7 (1952); Navy: 76–0 (1913)
- Longest win streak: Navy, 8 (1905–1930)
- Current win streak: Maryland 2 (2005–present)

Locations of Maryland and Navy

The Crab Bowl Classic is the name given to the Maryland–Navy football rivalry. It is an American college football rivalry between the Maryland Terrapins football team of the University of Maryland and the Navy Midshipmen football team of the United States Naval Academy. The two institutions, located in close proximity in the state of Maryland, first met for a football game in 1905. Since then, the series has often been marked by controversy, with incidents by players and supporters occurring both on and off the field. The winner of the game is awarded the Crab Bowl trophy.

Navy dominated the series early by winning the first eight games, between 1905 and 1930, which remains the longest streak. Maryland secured its first win in 1931 at a neutral site in Washington, D.C. After two more meetings, the series was suspended in 1934 when the Maryland administration protested a play.

The teams met again in 1950 when Navy had a last-minute opening in its schedule. The Terrapins won three consecutive games from 1950 to 1952, and the Midshipmen won three from 1958 to 1963. During the 1964 game, a Maryland player twice flashed an obscene gesture, which prompted Navy to cancel the series again. After contractual obligations were fulfilled with the following year's game, the series was put on hiatus for 40 years. Maryland and Navy finally resumed the rivalry in 2005 and again in 2010, with the Terps winning both contests.

== Background ==
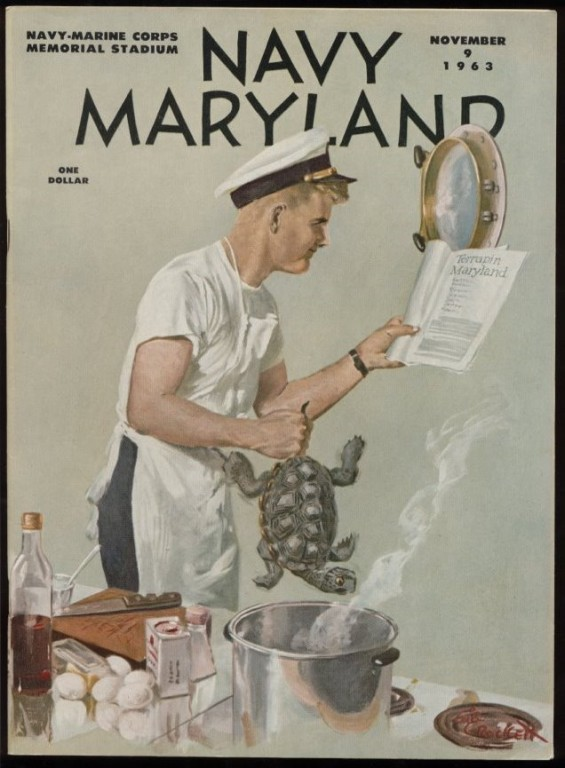
The 1963 game program.

The Naval Academy and the University of Maryland are separated by about 30 miles in the state of Maryland. The schools by their nature, a Federal service academy and a public university, differ radically in terms of culture and lifestyle. For many years, the University of Maryland possessed the reputation of a blue-collar, working-class school. Some students viewed the Naval Academy, with its strictly regimented culture, as elitist. A former Terrapins linebacker, Jerry Fishman, believed that many Midshipmen "thought they were far superior to the Maryland redneck coal miners." A former Navy fullback, Pat Donnelly, said that compared to a "public institution, [the Naval Academy] was night and day. I think there was a feeling of mutual dislike, but it wasn’t personal, it was more institutional."

According to former Maryland head coach (and former Maryland player) Ralph Friedgen, the sentiment at Navy has been that beating their archrival "Army is a must, but Maryland is a necessity." Darryl Hill, who attended both schools and broke the color barrier on each team, said that the Midshipmen "had a saying that beating Army is great, but beating Maryland is a must."

Despite a lopsided start in the early 20th century, the Terps and Midshipmen were evenly matched for most of the history of the series. Between 1931 and 1965, Navy won six and Maryland five games. In the 2005 season opener, Navy was coming off one of its best seasons in history with a 10–2 record the previous year. Maryland struggled later in 2005, but proved a competitive match for Navy and achieved a last-minute win, 23–20.

In addition to proximity and competitiveness, the rivalry was fueled by controversial incidents both on and off the field. Maryland supporters long held that Navy players used unnecessary roughness during play, a charge counter-accused by the Academy after the 1963 game. Some Midshipmen would travel to College Park to meet female students, which served to aggravate the ill feelings. Pranks and vandalism were commonplace on both campuses and exacerbated the already tense situation between Maryland and Navy.

== Series history ==
=== Early Years: 1905–1934 ===
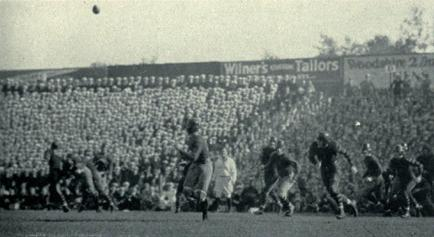
A forward pass during the 1931 game.

On October 25, 1905, the team then known as the Maryland Agricultural "Farmers" (or "Aggies") traveled to Annapolis to meet the Navy "Admirals" for the first time. In the first eight games of the series, Navy outscored the teams of the Maryland Agricultural College, Maryland State College (1916 and 1917), and finally, the University of Maryland (1930 onwards) by a combined margin of 256 points to 7.

The 1930 game proved to be the first competitive match of the series. Navy scored the only points with a 65-yard touchdown run on the second play of the game. The remainder was a defensive struggle, and Navy and Maryland advanced to the opposing one- and nine-yard lines, respectively, before being rebuffed. The 1931 match-up was held for the first time at a neutral site, Griffith Stadium in Washington, D.C. In the first Maryland win of the series, the Terrapins scored the only points on a trick "triple-pass" play. The Maryland administration put a halt to the series in 1934 amidst claims that Navy scored the winning go-ahead, 16–13, on an illegal play after reviewing game tape.

=== Revival: 1950–52 ===
The series resumed in 1950 after Georgetown unexpectedly canceled a scheduled game with Navy. Maryland agreed to fill in for Georgetown and hosted the Academy for the Byrd Stadium dedication game in front of a then Washington area-record crowd of 43,836 fans. The two teams last met in 1934, and since that time the Terrapins had hired head coach Jim Tatum. Tatum, an innovator of the split-T offense, had brought consistent success to Maryland in the intervening years. Fearing a renewal of post-game mischief, the Midshipmen attending the match were given strict orders: "Behave like gentlemen and go straight home after the Maryland–Navy football game in College Park tomorrow. No midshipmen will enter the goal post activity or other altercation following the game."

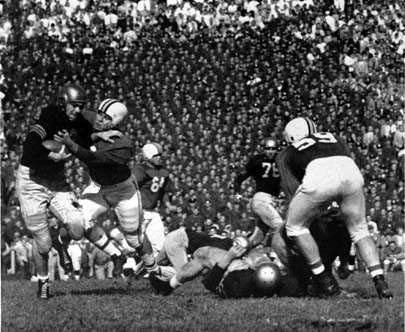
A Terrapin tackles a Midshipman in the 1952 game.

Newspapers predicted that Navy would win the 1950 game due to the inexperience of the Maryland quarterbacks, who were led by 19-year-old sophomore Jack Scarbath. A week before, Scarbath had his first start in a 27–7 loss to Georgia, but he would later become one of Maryland's greatest quarterbacks and the 1952 Heisman Trophy runner-up.

In the first quarter against Navy, Scarbath scored on a quarterback keeper. Before the half, he completed passes to ends Stan Karnash and Pete Augsburger for 44- and 59-yard touchdowns. In the third quarter, the Midshipmen responded with a score of their own. In the final period, Maryland end Elmer Wingate returned an interception 34 yards for another touchdown. Then, 54 seconds later, end Lew Weidensaul recovered a Midshipmen fumble, which allowed Ed Modzelewski to rush five yards for the final score by the Terrapins. Navy scored twice more, but Maryland held on to win, 35–21.

In 1951, pranks soon returned to the two campuses. Midshipmen were caught in the act of painting the letter "N" on various buildings on the Maryland campus and defacing the grass with the Navy emblem. Early in the 1951 game, Navy's Frank Brady returned a punt 100 yards to take the lead, 7–0. It was the only time of Maryland's undefeated season that they trailed an opponent. The Terrapins responded, and by the end of the third quarter, they had taken the game in hand, 34–7. Against the stubborn Navy line, Scarbath resorted to the pass more than usual, and completed 16 of 34 for 285 yards. Despite a late Midshipmen surge, Maryland held on for the win, 40–21.

=== Navy resurgence: 1958–1963 ===
Maryland struggled after the departure of Jim Tatum, and, in the next meeting in 1958, Navy routed them, 40–14. In 1959, Maryland students painted a presumptive final score of "Maryland 59, Navy 0" on the statue of Tecumseh in front of Bancroft Hall. The prediction was off the mark, as first-year head coach Wayne Hardin and future Heisman-winning halfback Joe Bellino helped Navy to a victory, 22–14.

In the early 1960s, the Terrapins were coached by former Florida State head coach Tom Nugent. While with the Seminoles, Nugent had wanted to recruit a black player, but felt the racial climate there was unsuitable. He said that "the head of the Ku Klux Klan lived in Tallahassee. You'd come to your car and there'd be a notice on it announcing a Klan meeting that night." When he took over at Maryland in 1959, Nugent saw his opportunity. He instructed the Terrapins' quarterbacks coach Lee Corso to find a black player who was academically and athletically suited to come to College Park. Corso had been impressed by Roger Staubach's preferred receiver, Darryl Hill, during a freshman match between Maryland and Navy, and had also heard a rumor that he was considering leaving the Naval Academy. In 1962, Corso convinced Hill to transfer to Maryland, a school that had just 32 African-Americans in its 35,000 student body, and become the first black player in the Atlantic Coast Conference (ACC). Once there, Hill quickly befriended the team's only Jew, linebacker Jerry Fishman.

=== Middle-finger incident: 1964 ===
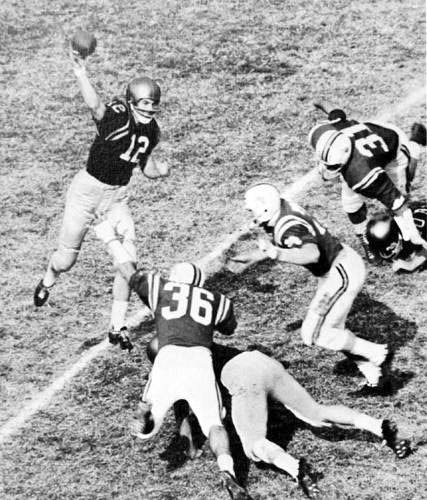
Roger Staubach (#12) gets rid of the ball as Jerry Fishman (#31) and others close in.

Before the 1964 game, Maryland supporters stole the Navy mascot, Bill the Goat, but what happened in the game itself was far more controversial. Terrapin players said they would seek revenge against Navy for roughing up Darryl Hill in 1963. Roger Staubach, Navy's Heisman Trophy quarterback, said that "it was not a friendly game ... Jerry [Fishman] did not have friendliness in his eyes. He had an extra mean streak that day."

After a punt return, Fishman was penalized for a hard hit that injured receiver Skip Orr directly in front of the Navy stands, intensifying the ever-present heckling from the crowd. In response, Fishman approached the Brigade of Midshipmen section and raised an extended middle finger. After Fishman was penalized again for a late hit on Staubach, Fishman gave the obscene gesture for a second time. High-ranking Navy officers noticed Fishman's middle finger and became incensed. Staubach later said that Fishman "told the fans he thought Maryland was number one and got his fingers wrong."

Due to Fishman's actions, Academy officials allowed their contractual obligation to the series to lapse after the 1965 game. Years later, Bud Thalman, Navy sports information director at the time, said the incident had taken place "when there was still some level of sportsmanship in athletes ... It was so out of character it was stunning. There was no inclination from Navy to seek out a renewal. That untoward act of sportsmanship created a bad taste among people." Navy head coach Wayne Hardin called Fishman's act "a disgrace to college football." Maryland's head coach, Tom Nugent, had a different opinion and said, "Both teams appeared to be just a bunch of red-blooded guys trying to kill each other."

The game itself was closely contested. Staubach completed 25 passes, but also threw two interceptions. Late in the fourth quarter, Navy took the lead, 22–21. With less than three minutes remaining, the Midshipmen kicked off and halfback Ken Ambrusko fielded the ball from the Terrapins' endzone. Ambrusko returned it 101 yards for a touchdown, and Maryland won the game, 27–22.

Despite his later assertions to the contrary, Maryland backup quarterback Jim "King" Corcoran did not play in the game. Corcoran, Fishman and some of the other Terrapins had defeated Staubach as freshmen on their respective universities' junior varsity teams in 1961.

=== Another revival: 2005 ===
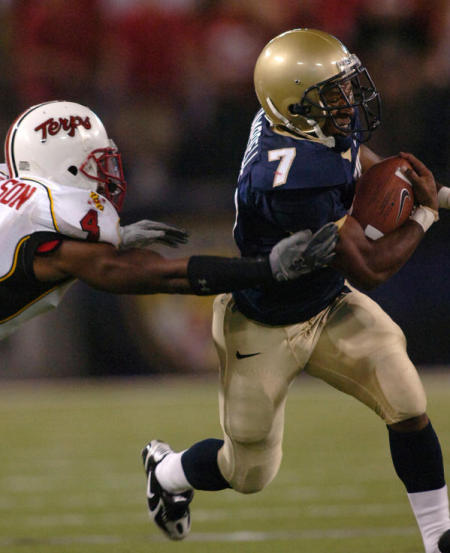
Cornerback Josh Wilson (#4) dives to tackle slotback Reggie Campbell (#7).

In 1997, Maryland had a new head coach, Ron Vanderlinden, and he immediately saw that Navy was a natural rival for his team, but was unaware of the past history. Vanderlinden attempted to renew the game, but it was not until after his relief that the idea materialized. In 2001, Ralph Friedgen was hired as his successor and spearheaded efforts to reinvigorate the team's old rivalries, including that against Navy. Friedgen, who played for Maryland as an offensive guard, was at the 1964 game as a recruit. He had also coached for nine years as Georgia Tech's offensive coordinator, and he harbored nostalgic feelings for a rivalry with the passion of Clean, Old-Fashioned Hate. Friedgen stated that, in addition to the rivalries with West Virginia and Virginia, a renewed in-state series would be even more meaningful. In 2002, the two schools agreed to meet for the first Crab Bowl Classic in forty years, scheduled for 2005.

The 2005 game was played at the M&T Bank Stadium in Baltimore and attended by 67,809 fans. The game was a close contest marked by costly Maryland turnovers and Navy penalties. A Sam Hollenbach interception helped Navy to end the first quarter with a 14–3 lead. Immediately before halftime, Maryland kicked a field goal and another third-quarter field goal narrowed the deficit to 14–9. Both Maryland and Navy rushed for touchdowns and failed to make two-point conversions in the final quarter. Maryland took over on their own 18-yard line after the Navy kick, trailing 20–15 with 4:37 left on the clock. Hollenbach then engineered a 12-play, 82-yard drive capped by an 11-yard touchdown pass and a two-point conversion. Navy took over with one minute left, and completed a first down on their 33-yard line before an interception sealed the game for the Terps 23–20.

=== Bowl game snubs: 2006–08 ===
In the next postseason, Maryland declined an invitation to face Navy in the Meineke Car Care Bowl in Charlotte, North Carolina. Instead, the Terps had their sights on the Champs Sports Bowl, to play Purdue in Orlando. According to Maryland athletic director Deborah Yow and coach Friedgen, the decision was based on the players' preference, a bigger school pay-out, warmer weather, a Big Ten opponent, and more media exposure. Also, the Champs Sports Bowl was deemed to be the fourth-most prestigious non-BCS bowl while the Meineke game was number-six.

Navy athletic director Chet Gladchuk stated that Maryland's snub was the basis for their rejection of Maryland offers to renew the series in 2010: "The stage was set for everything we had talked about, and all the good things that could have happened for fans—a big rematch, a bowl setting, a great city ... It would have been a sellout in Charlotte, and they decided to do something else. That has caused us to pause a little bit and think through the whole relationship." Ralph Friedgen responded by saying "He's gotta get over it," and that the Navy rivalry never entered into the decision-making process.

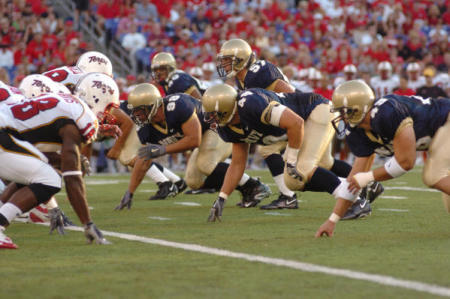
A snap during the 2005 game.

In 2008, Navy accepted a bid to play an ACC team in the inaugural EagleBank Bowl at Washington D.C.'s RFK Stadium. Maryland officials said they could not accept an invitation to the game due to it conflicting with the school's final exams. Gladchuk said, "We have exams that week, too, but we're going to show up ... Everybody has an excuse why they can't do this or can't do that. We're finding a way to accommodate the bowl's situation."

The Maryland staff reevaluated the EagleBank Bowl but determined it was impossible as many players had an exam on the game date. Yow said, "There are people who are at [academic] risk and need every moment of that week to prepare for the exams." As a result, Navy played Wake Forest for the second time of the season in the EagleBank Bowl and Maryland traveled to Boise, Idaho to play Nevada in the Humanitarian Bowl.

=== Future of the series: 2010– ===
In 2007, the two teams agreed to schedule a rematch for September 6, 2010. Deborah Yow stated that, "The citizens of Maryland have made it clear they want this game." Alluding to the Navy athletic staff's perceived reticence, she added, "We got past the Charlotte situation." The delay in scheduling was attributed to the need for a three-way contract between Maryland, Navy, and the stadium tenants, the Baltimore Ravens. For this reason, a renewal as far off as 2014 was not seriously discussed. Ralph Friedgen said, "I would like to see it as an annual game, but that's not for me to decide."

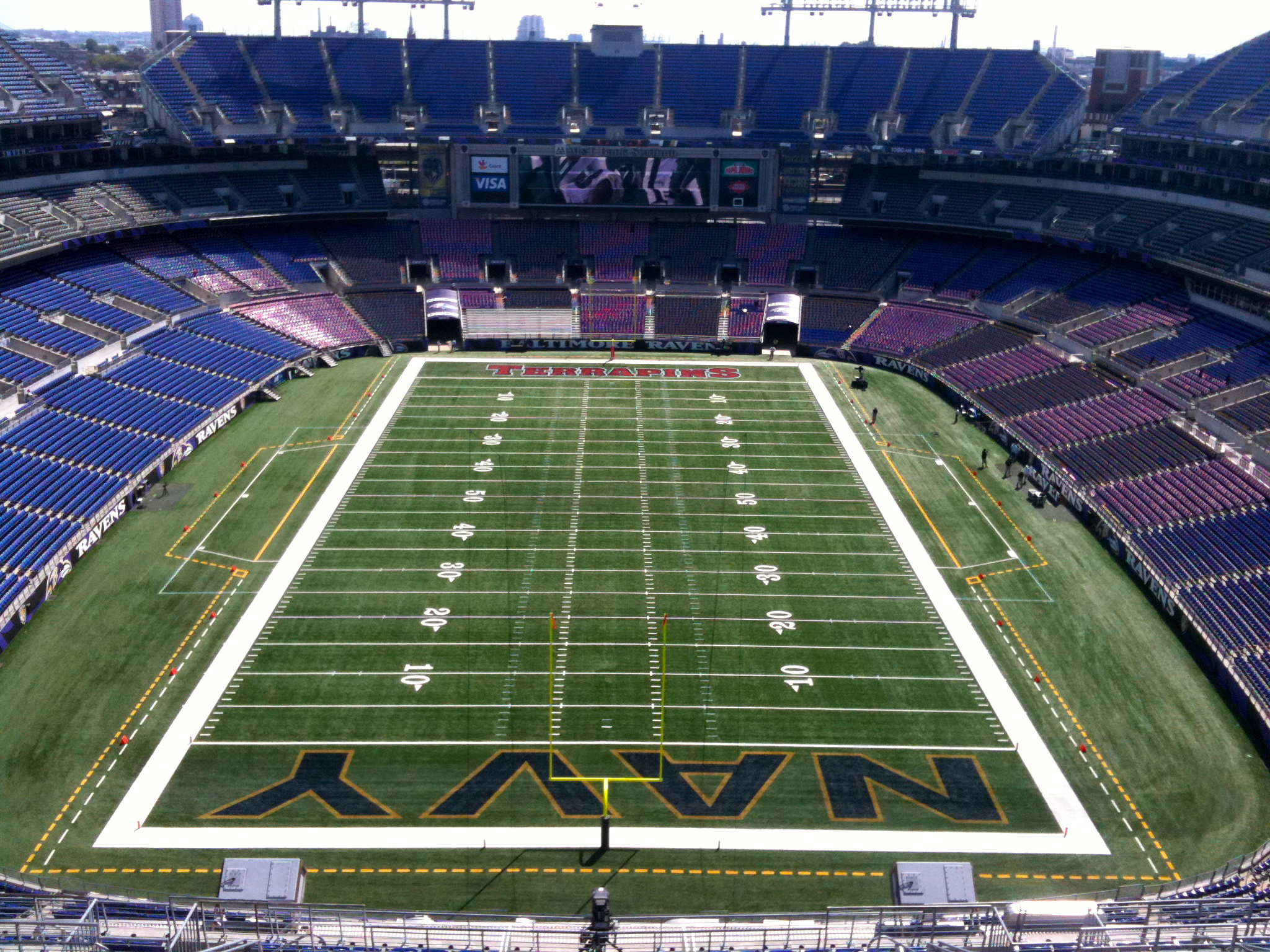
M&T Bank Stadium before the 2010 Crab Bowl Classic

The 2010 game would be the first to award The Crab Bowl to the winner. 69,348 fans turned out to see the game at M&T Bank Stadium in Baltimore, which was considered a home game for Maryland. Navy dominated the game statistically, controlling the ball for nearly 40 minutes and gaining 485 yards. The Midshipmen also converted 10 of 18 third-down chances. But their errors and failure to convert near the goal line cost them dearly. Navy kicker Joe Buckley missed a 32-yard field goal attempt, quarterback Ricky Dobbs lost a fumble at the Maryland 1-yard line, and Maryland eventually walked away with a 17–14 victory.

As of 2025, there are no future football games scheduled between Navy and Maryland.

== Trophy ==
In 2010, the Touchdown Club of Annapolis commissioned The Crab Bowl trophy, with underwriting by the D'Camera group. The trophy is a large "pewter bowl overflowing with pewter crabs", meant to be replicas of the Chesapeake Bay blue crab. The bowl "rests atop a mahogany base", engraved with "the results of the twenty previous Maryland-Navy games", which reach back to the rivalry's origin in 1905. It was designed by Tilghman Company, a family-owned jewelry store in Annapolis, Maryland. The Touchdown Club, founded in 1954, has been associated with both teams for a long time, and annually hosts a dinner honoring both teams. The trophy has been well received; the Terrapins' Testudo Times newspaper said that having the trophy "awarded by a third party" rather than "having a trophy dreamed up by the administrations at each school to create a more 'rivalry-y' feel" makes the award seem "more legitimate and less cheesy". Sports Illustrated included the award in its list of the 40 most "Unusual Trophies in College Football".

== Statistics ==
	Maryland	Navy
Games played	21	
Wins	7	14
Home wins	3	9
Road wins	0	2
Neutral wins	4	3
Consecutive wins	3	8
Most total points in a game	76	
Most points in a win	40	76
Most points in a loss	14	22
Fewest total points in a game	6	
Largest margin of victory	31	76
Smallest margin of victory	3	3
Total points scored in series	238	514
Shut-outs of opposing team	1	7

== Game results ==
Maryland victories	Navy victories

No.	Date	Location	Winner	Score
1	October 25, 1905	Annapolis, MD	Navy	17–0
2	October 10, 1906	Annapolis, MD	Navy	12–0
3	October 9, 1907	Annapolis, MD	Navy	12–0
4	October 14, 1908	Annapolis, MD	Navy	57–0
5	October 25, 1913	Annapolis, MD	Navy	76–0
6	October 11, 1916	Annapolis, MD	Navy	14–7
7	October 13, 1917	Annapolis, MD	Navy	62–0
8	November 22, 1930	Annapolis, MD	Navy	6–0
9	October 10, 1931	Washington, DC	Maryland	6–0
10	November 12, 1932	Baltimore, MD	Navy	28–7
11	October 13, 1934	Annapolis, MD	Navy	16–13

No.	Date	Location	Winner	Score
12	September 30, 1950	College Park, MD	#15 Maryland	35–21
13	November 10, 1951	Baltimore, MD	#3 Maryland	40–21
14	October 18, 1952	College Park, MD	#2 Maryland	38–7
15	November 8, 1958	Baltimore, MD	Navy	40–14
16	November 7, 1959	Baltimore, MD	Navy	22–14
17	November 9, 1963	Annapolis, MD	#4 Navy	42–7
18	November 7, 1964	College Park, MD	Maryland	27–22
19	November 6, 1965	Annapolis, MD	Navy	19–7
20	September 3, 2005	Baltimore, MD	Maryland	23–20
21	September 6, 2010	Baltimore, MD	Maryland	17–14
Series: Navy leads 14–7

== See also ==
- List of NCAA college football rivalry games
