= Choctawhatchee High School =

Coordinates: 30.4501985°N 86.618842°W

Location
- 110 Racetrack Rd NW; Fort Walton Beach, Florida 32547; United States

Information
- Type: Public
- Motto: Go Big Green!
- Established: September 22, 1952
- School board: Okaloosa County School District
- Superintendent: Marcus Chambers
- Principal: Michelle Heck
- Staff: 82.80 (on an FTE basis)
- Grades: 9–12
- Enrollment: 1,701 (2023–2024)
- Student to teacher ratio: 20.54
- Campus: suburban
- Colors: Kelly Green, white, and black
- Mascot: Indian
- Rivals: Niceville High School, Fort Walton Beach High School
- Yearbook: The Tomahawk
- Website: www2.okaloosaschools.com/o/choctaw

Choctawhatchee High School is a high school in Fort Walton Beach, Florida. It is the only school in Okaloosa County to offer the International Baccalaureate Diploma Programme. It also offers the Advanced Placement Program and honors classes, AFJROTC, a dual-enrollment aviation program offered by Embry–Riddle Aeronautical University, and pre-engineering classes (offered by the University of West Florida). Its newest innovation is the Information Technology Institute housing the Academy of Web Design as well as the Academy of Digital Design. Choctaw has received Florida's highest rating of A+ for many years.

== History ==
Choctawhatchee originally opened its doors in Shalimar, Florida, on September 22, 1952. It was filled over its capacity of 500 students, enrolling 625 students in grades 7 through 12. The local news held a contest to name the school, and thus Choctawhatchee, or "coming together," was picked. Later it was relocated to its current location in Fort Walton Beach, Florida with the old site becoming what is now Meigs Middle School.

== Extracurriculars ==
=== Football ===
In 1990, the football team was the 5A State Champion.

=== Band and Stylemarchers ===
The school's marching band, known as the Style Marchers, were back-to-back 5A Florida State Champions in 2004–05, 2005–06, and were runners-up for 2006–07. The Stylemarchers came back on top for another back-to-back 5A Florida State Championship for 2007–08, 2008–09. The Choctawhatchee Style Marchers also marched at the 2009 Macy's Thanksgiving Day Parade in N.Y. The choral and band departments annually send students to All-State and make superiors at their respective district festivals. The winter percussion ensemble has placed in the top 13 at the WGI World Championships since 1998. The drumline won 1st in she Scholastic Open competition in 2002 and were promoted to Scholastic World for the following year. In 2003, they placed 3rd, in 2004 they placed 12th, in 2005, 8th in 2006, 6th, and in 2007 &2008 they placed 4th in the Scholastic World Division. In 2019, the Drumline returned to Dayton, Ohio for the first time since 2013, placing 14th in finals. The Winter Color Guard has also been a finalist for many years at the WGI World Championships, including 2007, 2006, 2004, 2003. In 2014 the Winter Guard was awarded 13th in world class at WGI World Championships.

=== Film and Production ===
WBGI members make a news show and produce many other promotional videos for the school. In 2018, WBGI made a spirit video that won Choctaw the Sunshine State Showdown.

=== Newspaper ===
The school newspaper, Smoke Signals, won a top award from the Florida Scholastic Press Association in 1998.

=== Yearbook ===
The Tomahawk Yearbook has won numerous state and national awards.

== Traditions ==
At the beginning of each home football game, the school Indian, or student mascot, rides a horse across the field and throws a spear midfield. The idea was borrowed by Florida State University where during pregame the university symbol, Chief Osceola, rides Renegade the horse to plant a flaming spear at midfield.

In front of the school stands three totem poles just outside the front office. They are a symbol of school pride and represents various aspects of student life and have withstood hurricanes, attacks by rivals, and continue to serve as an emblem of the Choctaw High School family.

Also in front of the school are engraved bricks, purchased by students and then engraved so that they may forever be a part of the school.

The Alma Mater was written during the school's first year by the band director, Jim Leonard. The tune is a World War I song, "Long, Long Trail Awinding." In 1956, Bryan Lindsey came to Choctaw as choral director, and began writing words to "Big Green Indian." Lindsey collaborated with Leonard to compose the song. It became the school's fight song.

== Notable alumni ==
- Jackie Burkett (Class of 1955), football player
- Mike Alford (Class of 1961), football player
- Jan Faiks (Class of 1963), Alaska State Senator
- Richard O. Covey (Class of 1964), astronaut
- Mike Gabbard (Class of 1964), Hawaii State Senator
- George Bethune (Class of 1985), football player
- Henry Dittman (Class of 1990), actor
- Brian Marshall (Class of 1991), bassist of Creed and Alter Bridge
- Carolyn Murphy (Class of 1992), model
- Shane Gibson (Class of 1997), musician who was a guitarist in the band Korn
- Louis Williams (Class of 1997), football player
- Brian Zbydniewski, football player and coach
- Rick Malambri (Class of 2000), actor and dancer
- D. J. Hall (Class of 2004), football player
- Justin Brownlee (Class of 2006), basketball player
- Terren Jones (Class of 2009), football player
- Chris Martin (Class of 2009), football player
- Bryan Baker (Class of 2013), baseball player
- Richie Grant (Class of 2015), football player
- Alex Ward (Class of 2017), football player
- Asa Newell (attended 2021-22, transferred), basketball player
- Jayce Brown (Class of 2023), football player
- Cole Tabb (Class of 2024), football player
