= 1964 All-Atlantic Coast Conference football team =

American college football all-star team

The 1964 All-Atlantic Coast Conference football team consists of American football players chosen by various selectors for their All-Atlantic Coast Conference ("ACC") teams for the 1964 NCAA University Division football season. Selectors in 1964 included the Associated Press (AP) and the United Press International (UPI). The players selected to the first team by both the AP and UPI are displayed below in bold.

== All-Atlantic Coast Conference selections ==
=== Ends ===
- Ray Barlow, North Carolina State (AP-1)
- Richard Cameron, Wake Forest (AP-1)
- Chuck Drulis, Duke (AP-2)
- J. R. Wilburn, South Carolina (AP-2)

=== Tackles ===
- Glenn Sasser, North Carolina State (AP-1)
- Don Lonon, Duke (AP-1)
- Bob Kowalkowski, Virginia (AP-2)
- Olaf Drozdov, Maryland (AP-2)

=== Guards ===
- Jerry Fishman, Maryland (AP-1)
- Bennett Williams, North Carolina State (AP-1)
- Richy Zarro, North Carolina (AP-2)
- J. V. McCarthy, Duke (AP-2)

=== Centers ===
- Chris Hanburger, North Carolina (Pro Football Hall of Fame) (AP-1)
- Ted Bunton, Clemson (AP-2)

=== Backs ===
- Bob Davis, Virginia (AP-1)
- Mike Curtis, Duke (AP-1)
- Ken Willard, North Carolina (AP-1)
- Brian Piccolo, Wake Forest (AP-1)
- John Mackovic, Wake Forest (AP-2)
- Dan Reeves, South Carolina (AP-2)
- Hal Davis, Clemson (AP-2)
- Tom Hickey, Maryland (AP-2)

== Key ==
AP = Associated Press

UPI = United Press International

== See also ==
- 1964 College Football All-America Team
