= Terren Jones =

American football player (born 1991)

No. 75
- Position: Offensive tackle

Personal information
- Born: November 19, 1991 (age 34); Fort Meade, Maryland, U.S.
- Listed height: 6 ft 7 in (2.01 m)
- Listed weight: 341 lb (155 kg)

Career information
- High school: Choctawhatchee (Fort Walton Beach, Florida)
- College: Alabama State
- NFL draft: 2013: undrafted

Career history
- Atlanta Falcons (2013–2014); Washington Redskins (2014)*; Baltimore Ravens (2014)*; Tennessee Titans (2014); Buffalo Bills (2015)*; Tampa Bay Buccaneers (2015)*
- * Offseason or practice squad member only

Career NFL statistics
- Games played: 1
- Stats at Pro Football Reference

Terren Deray Jones (born November 19, 1991) is an American former professional football player who was an offensive tackle in the National Football League (NFL). He played college football for the Alabama State Hornets. He was a member of the NFL's Atlanta Falcons, Washington Redskins, Baltimore Ravens, Tennessee Titans, Buffalo Bills, and Tampa Bay Buccaneers.

== Early life ==
Jones attended Choctawhatchee High School in Fort Walton Beach, Florida.

== College career ==
Jones played for the Hornets at Alabama State University from 2009 to 2012. He was named 2010 Second-team All-SWAC, 2011 First-team All-SWAC, College Sporting News Division I Black College All-American, Boxtorow Honorable Mention All-American, 2012 First-team All-SWAC, and 2012 AFCA All-American.

== Professional career ==
Jones signed with the Atlanta Falcons in April 2013 after going undrafted in the 2013 NFL draft. He was released by the Falcons on September 3 and signed to the team's practice squad on September 5, 2013. He was promoted to the active roster on November 28, 2013. Jones was released by the Falcons on August 30, 2014 and signed to the team's practice squad on August 31, 2014. He was released by the Falcons on September 23, 2014.

Jones was signed to the Washington Redskins' practice squad on September 29, 2014. He was released by the Redskins on November 4, 2014.

He was signed to the Baltimore Ravens' practice squad on November 10, 2014.

Jones was signed off the Ravens' practice squad by the Tennessee Titans on December 2, 2014. He made his NFL debut on December 7, 2014 against the New York Giants, playing 42 snaps on offense. He was released by the Titans on July 31, 2015.

Jones signed with the Buffalo Bills on August 1, 2015. He was released by the Bills on August 31, 2015.

He was signed to the Tampa Bay Buccaneers' practice squad on September 6, 2015. Jones was released by the Buccaneers on September 8, 2015.
