= Dennis Duncan =

American gridiron football player (1943–2014)

Profile
- Position: Running back

Personal information
- Born: January 24, 1943; Henderson, Texas, U.S.
- Died: October 29, 2014 (aged 71); Henderson, Texas, U.S.
- Listed height: 6 ft 2 in (1.88 m)
- Listed weight: 225 lb (102 kg)

Career information
- College: Northwestern State; Louisiana College
- NFL draft: 1965: 20th round, 268th overall pick
- AFL draft: 1965: Red Shirt 12th round, 91st overall pick

Career history
- 1968–1970: Montreal Alouettes
- 1971: Ottawa Rough Riders

Awards and highlights
- Grey Cup champion (1970); 2× CFL East All-Star (1969, 1971)

Dennis Gale Duncan (January 24, 1943 – October 29, 2014) was an American professional football running back who played in the Canadian Football League (CFL).

After playing college football at Northwestern State University he joined the Montreal Alouettes in 1968 and rushed for 429 yards in his rookie season. The next season was his best in the CFL, with 1037 yards and an Eastern All-Star selection.

Duncan's final year in Montreal saw him rush for 823 yards and catch another 399 yards. The third-place Alouettes, coached by Sam Etcheverry, made Cinderella drive for the Grey Cup, but Duncan and Canadian slotback Bob McCarthy were both suspended after the regular season for breaking the team drinking prohibition. The Als won the Grey Cup without Duncan.

Duncan played a final year in the CFL with the Ottawa Rough Riders, where he rushed for 760 yards and was once again an All-Star. In all, he rushed for 3049 yards in his 4-year, 52-game career. He died in 2014 from Parkinson's disease.
