= Zurich, Montana =

Unincorporated community in Montana, United States

- Census-Designated Place
- Interactive map of Zurich, Montana
- Coordinates: 48°35′10″N 109°01′49″W
- Country: United States
- State: Montana
- County: Blaine

Area
  - Total: 0.54 sq mi (1.39 km^{2})
  - Land: 0.54 sq mi (1.39 km^{2})
  - Water: 0 sq mi (0.00 km^{2})
- Elevation: 2,389 ft (728 m)

Population (2020)
  - Total: 29
  - Density: 54.1/sq mi (20.88/km^{2})
- FIPS code: 30-82750
- GNIS feature ID: 2804272

Zurich is an unincorporated community in Blaine County, Montana, United States. Located along the Hi-Line of Montana, between Harlem and Chinook, along U.S. Route 2, It has a post office with the ZIP code of 59547. As of the 2020 census, Zurich had a population of 29.

The Milk River flows south of town.

== History ==
Sometime around 1887, Great Northern Railway officials named one of their main line sidings Zurich, for the city in Switzerland.

== Climate ==
According to the Köppen Climate Classification system, Zurich has a semi-arid climate, abbreviated "BSk" on climate maps.

Climate data for Zurich, Montana
Month	Jan	Feb	Mar	Apr	May	Jun	Jul	Aug	Sep	Oct	Nov	Dec	Year
Mean daily maximum °C (°F)	−4 (25)	−3 (27)	4 (39)	14 (57)	19 (67)	23 (74)	29 (84)	28 (82)	21 (70)	15 (59)	5 (41)	−1 (31)	13 (55)
Mean daily minimum °C (°F)	−16 (3)	−14 (6)	−8 (17)	0 (32)	6 (42)	10 (50)	13 (55)	12 (53)	6 (43)	1 (33)	−7 (20)	−12 (11)	−1 (31)
Average precipitation mm (inches)	15 (0.6)	10 (0.4)	15 (0.6)	25 (1)	46 (1.8)	71 (2.8)	38 (1.5)	28 (1.1)	30 (1.2)	18 (0.7)	15 (0.6)	13 (0.5)	320 (12.7)
Source: Weatherbase

== Education ==
It is in the Zurich Elementary School District and the Chinook High School District. The latter is a component of Chinook Public Schools.

The Zurich school educates students from kindergarten through 8th grade.

== Transportation ==
Amtrak’s Empire Builder, which operates between Seattle/Portland and Chicago, passes through the town on BNSF tracks, but makes no stop. The nearest station is located in Havre, 31 miles (50 km) to the west.

== Notable person ==
Zurich is the birthplace of Mike Tilleman.

== Demographics ==
Historical population
Census	Pop.	Note	%±
2020	29		—
U.S. Decennial Census
