= Bob Cappadona =

American football player (born 1942)

No. 33, 36
- Position: Running back

Personal information
- Born: December 13, 1942 (age 83); Watertown, Massachusetts, U.S.
- Listed height: 6 ft 1 in (1.85 m)
- Listed weight: 225 lb (102 kg)

Career information
- High school: Watertown
- College: Notre Dame; Northeastern (1963-1965)
- NFL draft: 1965: 10th round, 128th overall pick
- AFL draft: 1965: Red Shirt 3rd round, 23rd overall pick

Career history
- Boston Patriots (1966-1967); Buffalo Bills (1968)

Career AFL statistics
- Rushing yards: 460
- Rushing average: 3.7
- Receptions: 24
- Receiving yards: 196
- Total touchdowns: 5
- Stats at Pro Football Reference

Robert Joseph Cappadona (born December 13, 1942) is a member of the Northeastern University athletics Hall of Fame. Cappadona was inducted in 1977 for his accomplishments in football. Cappadona also enjoyed a three-year professional football career with the Boston Patriots and Buffalo Bills. Cappadona was a stand out star at Watertown High School as well.

== Northeastern University ==
During his time at Northeastern Cappadona helped lead Northeastern to their first undefeated season in 1963, a season in which Northeastern was invited to the first and only bowl game, the Eastern Bowl. Cappadona still finds himself near the top of many of the records for Northeastern football. During his time at Northeastern University, Cappadona was a brother of Beta Gamma Epsilon Fraternity.

== Professional career ==
Cappadona played with both the Boston Patriots and the Buffalo Bills during its time as the AFL. Cappadona was the Patriots Rookie of the Year in 1966.

== Personal life ==
Bob Cappadona currently owns and operates an insurance agency located in Watertown. Cappadona Insurance was established in 1972.
