= Rich Zecher =

American football player (born 1943)

No. 74, 77, 81
- Position: Defensive tackle

Personal information
- Born: October 14, 1943 (age 83); Alameda, California, U.S.
- Listed height: 6 ft 2 in (1.88 m)
- Listed weight: 255 lb (116 kg)

Career information
- High school: Alameda
- College: Utah State
- AFL draft: 1965: 9th round, 67th overall pick

Career history
- Oakland Raiders (1965); Miami Dolphins (1966–1967); Buffalo Bills (1967)
- Stats at Pro Football Reference

Rich Zecher (born October 14, 1943) is an American former professional football player who was a defensive tackle in the American Football League (AFL). He played college football for the Utah State Aggies. Zecher played in the AFL for the Oakland Raiders in 1965, Miami Dolphins from 1966 to 1967 and Buffalo Bills in 1967.
