= Jay Cunningham =

American football player (born 1943)

No. 21
- Positions: Cornerback, return specialist

Personal information
- Born: October 9, 1943 (age 83); Youngstown, Ohio, U.S.
- Listed height: 5 ft 10 in (1.78 m)
- Listed weight: 185 lb (84 kg)

Career information
- High school: South (Youngstown)
- College: Bowling Green (1961–1964)
- AFL draft: 1965: 14th round, 111th overall pick

Career history
- Boston Patriots (1965–1967); San Diego Chargers (1969)*
- * Offseason or practice squad member only
- Stats at Pro Football Reference

Jay Cunningham (born October 9, 1943) is an American former professional football cornerback who played for the Boston Patriots of the American Football League (AFL). He played college football for the Bowling Green Falcons, and was selected by the Patriots in the 14th round of the 1965 AFL draft.

== Early life ==
Jay Cunningham was born on October 9, 1943, in Youngstown, Ohio. He attended South High School in Youngstown.

== College career ==
Cunningham enrolled at Bowling Green State University (BGSU) to play college football for the Falcons as a halfback. He was on the freshman team in 1961, and was a three-year varsity letterman from 1962 to 1964. He earned All-Mid-American Conference honors each season he was on the varsity team, recording varsity career totals of 1,258 rushing yards, 32 receptions, 21 rushing touchdowns, and 23 total touchdowns. Cunningham was inducted into the BGSU Athletic Hall of Fame in 1991.

== Professional career ==
Cunningham was selected by the Boston Patriots in the 14th round, with the 111th overall pick, of the 1965 AFL draft as a cornerback. He played in 40 games, starting one, for the Patriots from 1965 to 1967, totaling three interceptions for 70 yards and one touchdown, one safety, 64 kick returns for 1,372 yards, and 22 punt returns for 140 yards. Cunningham's 627 kick return yards in 1967 were the third-most in the AFL. He was released on September 3, 1968, before the start of the 1968 AFL season.

Cunningham signed with the AFL's San Diego Chargers in early June 1969. He sprained his wrist during a preseason game on August 16, 1969, and was released on August 28, 1969, before the final preseason game.

== Post-playing career ==
After his AFL career, Cunningham returned to Bowling Green State to serve as a football coach and work with the Student Development Program. He then coached football at Alabama A&M, Southern Illinois, and Louisville. He was later the head football coach at St. Augustine High School in New Orleans.
