= Mike Tilleman =

American football player (1944–2020)

No. 74, 78
- Position: Defensive tackle

Personal information
- Born: March 30, 1944; Zurich, Montana, U.S.
- Died: September 18, 2020 (aged 76); Chinook, Montana, U.S.
- Listed height: 6 ft 7 in (2.01 m)
- Listed weight: 272 lb (123 kg)

Career information
- High school: Chinook (Chinook, Montana)
- College: Montana
- NFL draft: 1965: 12th round, 163rd overall pick
- AFL draft: 1965: Red Shirt 5th round, 34th overall pick

Career history
- Minnesota Vikings (1966); New Orleans Saints (1967–1970); Houston Oilers (1971–1972); Atlanta Falcons (1973–1976)

Awards and highlights
- George Halas Award (1973); 2× 2nd-team All-BSC (1963, 1964)

Career NFL statistics
- Fumble recoveries: 5
- Sacks: 53.5
- Stats at Pro Football Reference

Michael John Tilleman (March 30, 1944 – September 18, 2020) was an American professional football player who was a defensive tackle in the National Football League (NFL) for 11 seasons (1966–76). He played college football for the Montana Grizzlies. In 1972, he received the Brian Piccolo Comeback Player of the Year Award, after having come back from cancer surgery in 1972 (and an earlier cancer surgery in 1969), and leading the NFL in sacks and tackles.

== Early life ==
Tilleman was born on March 30, 1944, in Chinook (a town of less than 2,000 people) or Zurich, Montana, 25 miles from the Canadian border. He was raised on a wheat farm and ranch near Zurich by Henry (Hank) and Irma Tilleman (née D'Hooge), Belgian immigrants; and was one of four children. He went to grade school in a one-room schoolhouse in Zurich.

He was a prep star at Chinook High School, graduating in 1961. He played on the football, basketball and track teams. He also played baseball. The 1960 football team won a championship. Tilleman was a high-school All-American in football that season. As a 225 lb (102.1 kg) senior tackle, in January 1961 he was named to the 14th annual Sporting News High School Football Team. He was also on the school's rifle shooting and farm mechanics teams.

== College career ==
Tilleman was recruited by the University of Georgia, the University of Washington, and the United States Naval Academy, but accepted a scholarship to attend the University of Montana. He played defensive line on the Grizzlies football team from 1963 to 1964, where he was a second-team All-Big Sky Conference selection in both seasons, despite his team winning only four games over those two seasons. He graduated in three years, with a Bachelor of Science degree in business administration; and for a time held the school's record for most credits taken in an academic quarter.

== Professional career ==
=== Minnesota Vikings ===
The Minnesota Vikings selected Tilleman as a "future" in the 12th round with the 163rd overall pick of the 1965 NFL draft. He was also selected by the Denver Broncos as a futures draft pick in the fifth round of the 1965 American Football League redshirt draft, 33rd overall. Tilleman had earned enough credits to graduate from Montana before his senior year, and bypassed his senior football season to sign with the Vikings.

Tilleman was on the Vikings' taxi squad in 1965. He did not play for the Vikings until the 1966 season, when he started two games at defensive tackle, and appeared in 12 games.

=== New Orleans Saints ===
He was left exposed in the 1967 expansion draft and was selected by the New Orleans Saints in their inaugural season. He played for the Saints from 1967 to 1970, starting 54 of the 56 games in which he appeared. In 1967, Tilleman started 12 games at right defensive tackle for the Saints, and unofficially had two quarterback sacks. Sacks did not become an official NFL statistic until 1982. In 1968, he started all 14 games at left defensive tackle or left defensive end, with two fumble recoveries and seven sacks. The following season he started all 14 games at left defensive tackle, with 4.5 sacks. In 1970, he again started all 14 games at left defensive tackle, with 3.5 sacks and two fumble recoveries. He was selected the Saints' most valuable player that season.

=== Houston Oilers ===
In June 1971, the Saints traded Tilleman to the Houston Oilers for offensive lineman Glen Ray Hines, linebacker Jess Lewis and two future draft choices. In 1971, he started all 14 games at left tackle for the Oilers, with eight sacks. He again started all 14 games at left tackle for the Oilers in 1972, with a career-high and team-leading 11 sacks; it also being reported that he had 14 or 15 sacks that season, the most in the NFL. He led the team in individual tackles and assisted tackles. In addition to leading the NFL in sacks, he is also reported to have led the NFL in tackles that season. He was named the NFL's Brian Piccolo Comeback Player of the Year in 1972, having recovered from cancer surgery in the summer before the 1972 season started; and was selected as the Oilers most valuable player.

The Oilers were 4–9–1 in 1971, and 1–13 in 1972. Tilleman played out his option with the Oilers, and asked to be traded to a contending team. In January 1973, the Oilers traded Tilleman to the Atlanta Falcons for a first-round draft choice in the 1973 NFL draft.

=== Atlanta Falcons ===
In trading for Tilleman, Falcons coach Norm Van Brocklin stated they wanted someone who could contribute immediately as a starter. Tilleman himself perceived the Falcons as having the potential to be a winning team in the present, whereas the Oilers were not going to be competitive until sometime in the future.

In Atlanta, Tilleman joined a defensive line that included future Hall of Fame defensive end Claude Humphrey, defensive end John Zook, and defensive tackle Mike Lewis. Tilleman played alongside Humphrey at left end in 1973, 1974 and 1976, Humphrey missing the 1975 season with an injury. He played alongside Lewis at right tackle during his four years in Atlanta, and all three played on the line with Zook at defensive right end from 1973 to 1975. They were considered among the top defensive lines in the NFL. He also played on the line with defensive end Jeff Merrow, who replaced Humphrey in 1975 and Zook in 1976.

The 1973 Falcons had a 9–5 record. Tilleman started 13 games at left tackle, with six sacks. Humphrey (11) and Zook (8) combined for 19 sacks and both went to the Pro Bowl; with Lewis starting all 14 games at right tackle, with 1.5 sacks. Tilleman is reported to have received All-Pro recognition in 1973. The Falcons had a winning record even though their offense was 20th in NFL in points scored. Defensively, however, the Falcons were third in the NFL in passing yards allowed, sixth in total yards allowed, and ninth in the NFL in points allowed.

In 1974, he started 12 games at left tackle with four sacks. The Falcons had a 3–11 record that season, with the worst offense in the NFL. They scored 111 points in 14 games, with only 2,800 total yards on 806 plays; all three statistics at the bottom of the NFL's 26 teams. The Falcons 1974 defense was second in the league in the number of plays on the field, and was 11th in points allowed, and 15th in yards allowed.

The following season, the Falcons were 4–10, with the offense ranked 19th in points scored, 20th in total yards and 23rd in plays on offense. The defense was on the field for more plays than any other team in the NFL (1,043). It has been reported that in 1975 Tilleman had five sacks or 4.5 sacks, one fumble recovery, 72 individual tackles, and 23 assisted tackles. It has also been reported he had four sacks and no fumble recoveries that season. In 1976, Tilleman's final season, the Falcons also used a 3–4 defense, with Tilleman playing nose guard for the first time in his career. He had 14 tackles in a late September game against the Chicago Bears. He had 3.5 sacks that season.

Tilleman retired after the 1976 season. Over an 11-year career, Tilleman started 137 games, with 53.5 sacks and 5 fumble recoveries.

== Legacy and honors ==
Tilleman was known for using head slaps against offensive linemen. An offensive lineman once commented that he would rather catch javelins for an hour than to take head slaps from Mike Tilleman, saying "It's bound to be more fun. He's absolutely lethal with those hands". After retiring, Tilleman once light-heartedly remarked that he retired voluntarily, even though he could have continued playing; but would have been forced to retire when the NFL banned the head-slap, as it was his main weapon. He was also known for this physical strength and the fact he could not be intimidated, especially in light of his bouts with cancer.

Tilleman led a 20-year effort to build a football field for Montana State University-Northern, raising $3 million in private funding to build the field. The field is located in Havre, Montana, where Tilleman and his family lived. The field was inaugurated in an August 26, 2020 ceremony, attended by Tilleman on a scooter after spending nearly six months in the hospital that year with a bacterial infection in his heart. The field is called the Tilleman Family Field. Tilleman died less than one month later.

Tilleman has been inducted into the Saints Hall of Fame and the Montana Football Hall of Fame. In 2003, he was inducted into the University of Montana Grizzly Hall of Fame.

== Personal life and death ==
Tilleman had a family history of cancer, with his mother undergoing six operations for cancer. Tilleman was first diagnosed with cancer himself at age 25, and underwent surgery for stomach or bowel cancer twice during his playing career, in 1969 and 1972. In 1969, the cancer was fortuitously discovered during an operation for a burst appendix. He spent six weeks in the hospital at 25, wondering if he would make it out. He later worked with the American Cancer Society.

Tilleman and his wife Gloria (Thorvaldson) Tilleman of Winnipeg, Manitoba, Canada married soon after he joined the Vikings. Among other jobs during the offseason, Tilleman sold concrete for construction projects. After retiring, they lived in Havre, Montana, where they ran Tilleman Motor Company, a local General Motors dealership. He later sold agricultural equipment as well. He was once awarded Time magazine's auto dealer of the year award because of his philanthropic activities. He also helped with coaching the Harve High School football team. Later in life he returned to ranching, operating a large heard of Red Angus cattle. He and Gloria had three children, Suzanne, Christopher and Craig, the latter of whom continued to operate the family's car dealership. Tilleman was also an avid cribbage player.

Tilleman's philanthropy often focused on providing educational opportunities. Among other things, he hosted a celebrity pheasant hunt, called "Legends for Lights", where former NFL players went to Havre every Fall and all money raised was donated to the Northern Lights Athletic Scholarship Foundation, which Tilleman helped found, for the MSU-Northern athletic program, providing scholarships and paying for one full-time coaching position. In 1991, he was elected to the Northern Montana Hospital board of trustees.

Tilleman died on September 18, 2020, aged 76, after suffering the effects of a bacterial heart infection. He was survived by his wife, three children and seven grandchildren.
