= Mike Alford =

American football player (born 1943)

No. 50
- Position: Center

Personal information
- Born: June 19, 1943; DeFuniak Springs, Florida, U.S.
- Died: November 26, 2013 (aged 70)
- Listed height: 6 ft 3 in (1.91 m)
- Listed weight: 230 lb (104 kg)

Career information
- High school: Choctawhatchee (Fort Walton Beach, Florida)
- College: Auburn (1961–1964)
- NFL draft: 1965: 14th round, 194th overall pick
- AFL draft: 1965: 19th round, 149th overall pick

Career history
- St. Louis Cardinals (1965); Detroit Lions (1966–1967); Michigan Arrows (1968); Atlanta Falcons (1969)*
- * Offseason or practice squad member only

Career NFL statistics
- Games played: 25
- Stats at Pro Football Reference

Michael Deal Alford (June 19, 1943 – November 26, 2013) was an American professional football center who played two seasons in the National Football League (NFL) with the St. Louis Cardinals and Detroit Lions. He was selected by the Cardinals in the fourteenth round of the 1965 NFL draft after playing college football at Auburn University.

== Early life and college ==
Michael Deal Alford was born on June 19, 1943, in DeFuniak Springs, Florida. He attended Choctawhatchee High School in Fort Walton Beach, Florida.

He was a member of the Auburn Tigers football team from 1961 to 1964 and a three-year letterman from 1962 to 1964.

== Professional career ==
Alford was selected by the St. Louis Cardinals in the 14th round, with the 194th overall pick, of the 1965 NFL draft, and by the Kansas City Chiefs in the 19th round, with the 149th overall pick, of the 1965 AFL draft. He chose to sign with the Cardinals and played in 13 games for the team during the 1965 NFL season.

On August 25, 1966, Alford was traded to the Detroit Lions for an undisclosed draft pick. He appeared in 12 games for the Lions during the 1966 season. He was released on September 11, 1967, and signed to the Lions' taxi squad, where he spent the entire 1967 season. He re-signed with the Lions in 1968 but was released later that year. Alford also played for the Michigan Arrows of the Continental Football League during the 1968 season. He was signed back to the Lions in 1969.

On July 9, 1969, Alford was traded to the Atlanta Falcons for an undisclosed draft pick. He was released by the Falcons on July 27, 1969.

== Personal life ==
Alford died on November 26, 2013.
