= Bo Hickey =

American football player (1945–2023)

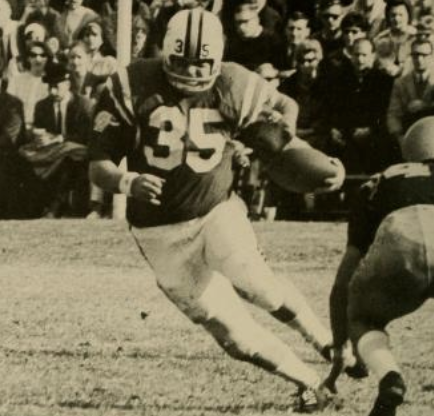
- Hickey playing for Maryland in 1964

No. 33, 31, 35, 20
- Position: Fullback

Personal information
- Born: October 7, 1945; Stamford, Connecticut, U.S.
- Died: February 28, 2023 (aged 77); Connecticut, U.S.
- Listed height: 5 ft 11 in (1.80 m)
- Listed weight: 230 lb (104 kg)

Career information
- High school: Stamford Catholic
- College: Maryland (1963-1965)
- NFL draft: 1967: 14th round, 357th overall pick

Career history
- Montreal Alouettes (1965)*; Brooklyn Dodgers (1966); Denver Broncos (1967); Westchester/Long Island Bulls (1968–1970)
- * Offseason or practice squad member only

Awards and highlights
- Second-team All-ACC (1964)

Career AFL statistics
- Rushing yards: 263
- Rushing average: 3.6
- Receptions: 7
- Receiving yards: 36
- Total touchdowns: 5
- Stats at Pro Football Reference

Thomas Henry "Bo" Hickey (October 7, 1945 – February 28, 2023) was an American professional football player who was a fullback for the Denver Broncos of the American Football League (AFL). He played college football for the Maryland Terrapins.

== Early life ==
Hickey was born and grew up in Stamford, Connecticut and attended Stamford Catholic High School, where he played football, baseball, basketball and ran track. He was named All-Fairfield County and All-State in football as a senior.

== College career ==
Hickey spent two seasons at the University of Maryland, sitting out his freshman year as freshmen were ineligible to play varsity sports at the time. He became the Terrapins' starting running back as a sophomore and was named second-team All-Atlantic Coast Conference after leading the team with 894 rushing yards and five rushing touchdowns while catching 11 passes for 94 yards. Hickey was academically ineligible to return to Maryland for his junior season.

== Professional career ==
After failing out of Maryland, Hickey signed a contract with the Montreal Alouettes of the Canadian Football League. He played in several exhibition games in 1965 but did not make the team. Hickey was then signed by the Brooklyn Dodgers of the minor league Continental Football League, where he was coached by Pro Football Hall of Famer and Stamford native Andy Robustelli, and finished sixth in the league with 551 rushing yards on 135 carries along with eight touchdowns.

Hickey was selected 357th overall in the 14th round of the 1967 NFL/AFL draft by the St. Louis Cardinals. Hickey was cut by the Cardinals during training camp but was signed by the Denver Broncos on September 9, 1967. He played in 12 games for the Broncos, rushing 73 times for 263 yards and 4 touchdowns while also catching 7 passes for 36 yards and another touchdown before breaking his foot late in the season against the New York Jets. Hickey was released by the Broncos on July 23, 1968 after failing his physical. After his release Hickey returned to minor league football and played three seasons for the Westchester (and later Long Island) Bulls of the Atlantic Coast Football League.

== Post-football ==
After retiring from football he became an assistant football coach at Staples High School before joining the coaching staff at New Canaan High School. He later also became the school's head ice hockey coach, holding the position for 20 years. Hickey worked as the superintendent of Lakeview Cemetery in New Canaan, Connecticut for 34 years until his retirement in 2015.

Hickey died in Connecticut on February 28, 2023, at the age of 77.
