= Mike Strofolino =

American football player (born 1944)

No. 51, 61, 57, 65
- Position: Linebacker

Personal information
- Born: February 6, 1944 (age 82); Brooklyn, New York, U.S.
- Listed height: 6 ft 2 in (1.88 m)
- Listed weight: 230 lb (104 kg)

Career information
- High school: St. Francis Prep (Queens, New York)
- College: Villanova (1961-1964)
- NFL draft: 1965: 4th round, 50th overall pick
- AFL draft: 1965: 13th round, 97th overall pick

Career history
- Baltimore Colts (1965); Los Angeles Rams (1965); St. Louis Cardinals (1966–1968); Hamilton Tiger-Cats (1969–1970)

Career NFL statistics
- Fumble recoveries: 1
- Sacks: 4
- Stats at Pro Football Reference

Mike Strofolino (born February 6, 1944) is an American former professional football player who was a linebacker in the National Football League (NFL). He played college football for the Villanova Wildcats. He played in the NFL for the Baltimore Colts and Los Angeles Rams in 1965 and for the St. Louis Cardinals from 1966 to 1968.
