= Olie Cordill (American football, born 1943) =

American football player (born 1943)

No. 44, 48
- Positions: Punter, defensive back

Personal information
- Born: June 20, 1943 (age 83); Houston, Texas, U.S.
- Listed height: 6 ft 3 in (1.91 m)
- Listed weight: 185 lb (84 kg)

Career information
- High school: Lafayette (Lafayette, Louisiana)
- College: Memphis State
- NFL draft: 1965: 11th round, 153rd overall pick

Career history
- Cleveland Browns (1966)*; San Diego Chargers (1967); Atlanta Falcons (1968); New Orleans Saints (1969); Los Angeles Rams (1970)*
- * Offseason or practice squad member only
- Stats at Pro Football Reference

Olie James Cordill Jr. (born June 20, 1943) is an American former professional football player in the American Football League (AFL) and National Football League (NFL). He played college football for the Southwestern Louisiana Bulldogs and Memphis State Tigers, and was selected by the Cleveland Browns in the 11th round of the 1965 NFL draft. He played in the AFL for the San Diego Chargers, and in the NFL for the Atlanta Falcons and New Orleans Saints.

== Early life ==
Olie James Cordill Jr. was born on June 20, 1943, in Houston, Texas. He participated in high school football and track at Lafayette High School in Lafayette, Louisiana.

== College career ==
Cordill enrolled at the University of Southwestern Louisiana to play college football for the Bulldogs. He was the Bulldogs' starting quarterback for the final seven games of his 1961 freshman season, and also served as the team's punter. In 1962, he transferred to Memphis State University due to being unhappy. Cordill had to sit out the 1962 season due to NCAA transfer rules. He was then a three-year varsity letterman, defensive back, punter, and backup quarterback for the Memphis State Tigers from 1963 to 1965. In November 1963, the Houston Chronicle said Cordill was one of the country's best punters with a 40.6 yard average. On October 26, 1964, he had season-ending surgery due to a broken thumb. In 1965, he tied a school single-game record with three interceptions on defense.

== Professional career ==
Cordill was selected by the Cleveland Browns in the 11th round, with the 153rd overall pick, of the 1965 NFL draft and by the Houston Oilers in the fourth round, with the 26th overall pick, of the 1965 AFL redshirt draft. He spent the 1966 season on the Browns' taxi squad. He was released on August 29, 1967, after the fourth of six preseason games.

Cordill later joined the AFL's San Diego Chargers, appearing in three games while starting one. He made his pro debut at punter in the 1967 regular season finale, "booming" punts of 52, 46, and 47 yards for a 48.3 average. He was released by the Chargers on August 5, 1968, after the first game of the 1968 preseason.

Cordill signed with the Atlanta Falcons of the NFL on August 13, 1968. He played in one game for the Falcons as a reserve defensive back before being released on October 25, 1968.

Cordill signed with the NFL's New Orleans Saints on January 29, 1969. He played in 12 games for the Saints in 1969, punting for a 40.9 average while leading the team in punts (42) and punting yards (1,719). He was waived on June 17, 1970.

On July 25, 1970, it was reported that Cordill had been signed by the Los Angeles Rams of the NFL. He was waived on August 13, 1970.

== Personal life ==
Cordill's father, Olie Cordill, also played in the NFL.
