= Braden Beck =

American football player (born 1944)

No. 17
- Position: Kicker

Personal information
- Born: January 12, 1944 (age 82); Oakland, California, U.S.
- Listed height: 6 ft 2 in (1.88 m)
- Listed weight: 200 lb (91 kg)

Career information
- High school: Baton Rouge (Baton Rouge, Louisiana)
- College: Stanford
- AFL draft: 1965: 19th round, 150th overall pick

Career history
- Dallas Cowboys (1965)*; San Francisco 49ers (1970–1971)*; Houston Oilers (1971)
- * Offseason or practice squad member only

Career statistics
- Games played: 2
- Stats at Pro Football Reference

Braden William Beck (born January 12, 1944) is an American former professional football player who was a kicker for the Houston Oilers of the National Football League (NFL). He played college football for the Stanford Indians (now Cardinal).
