= Gene Jeter =

American football player (born 1942)

No. 51
- Position: Linebacker

Personal information
- Born: February 9, 1942 (age 84); Montgomery, Alabama, U.S.
- Listed height: 6 ft 3 in (1.91 m)
- Listed weight: 235 lb (107 kg)

Career information
- High school: Booker T. Washington (Montgomery)
- College: Arkansas–Pine Bluff; Texas Southern
- NFL draft: 1965: 12th round, 164th overall pick
- AFL draft: 1965: 10th round, 73rd overall pick

Career history
- Denver Broncos (1965–1967)
- Stats at Pro Football Reference

Gene Jeter (born February 9, 1942) is an American former professional football player who was a linebacker for the Denver Broncos of the American Football League (AFL) from 1965 to 1967. He played college football for the Arkansas–Pine Bluff Golden Lions and Texas Southern Tigers.
