= Watertown High School (Massachusetts) =

School in Watertown, Massachusetts, US

Coordinates: 42°22′12.0″N 71°10′41.5″W

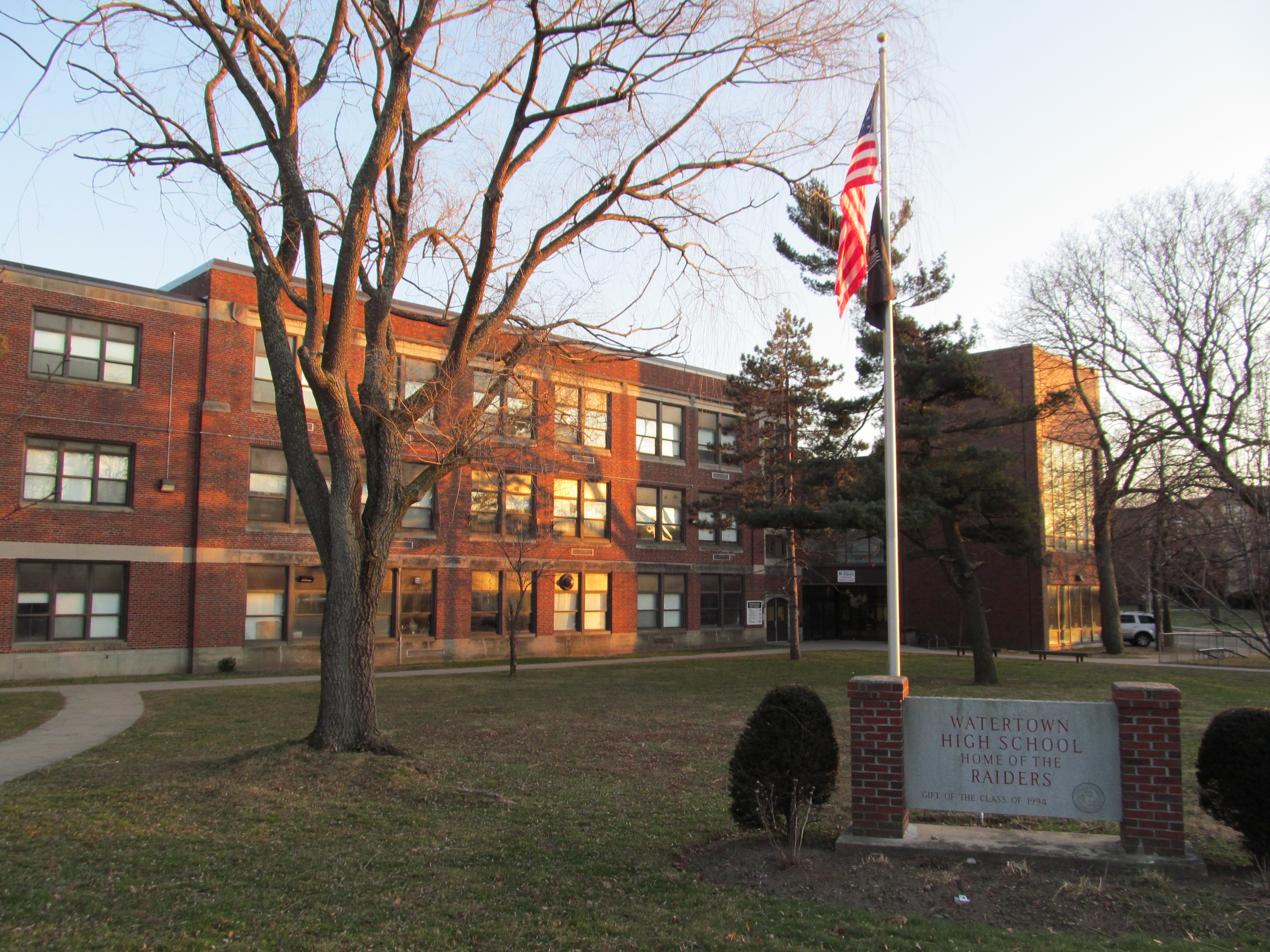

Location
- 50 Columbia Street; Watertown, MA 02472; United States

Information
- Type: Public high school
- School district: Watertown Public Schools
- Principal: Joel Giacobozzi
- Teaching staff: 68.70 (FTE)
- Grades: 9–12
- Enrollment: 760 (2023-2024)
- Student to teacher ratio: 11.06
- Colors: Black; Red
- Team name: Raiders
- Website: whs.watertown.k12.ma.us
- Last updated: January 2, 2022; 4 years ago

Watertown High School (WHS) is the local high school, built in 1925, for Watertown, Massachusetts, United States. The school is home to the Watertown Raiders, who are best known for their varsity field hockey and boys' basketball programs. Watertown's colors are black and red. The school newspaper is the Raider Times. On May 8, 1930, ex-President Calvin Coolidge was received at the school as town celebrated its 300th anniversary. As a part of the celebration, a national radio program was broadcast from the high school marking the momentous anniversary.

The demolition of the old Watertown High School building began on November 13, 2023. With the construction scheduled to finish in time for the 2026 school year.

The new Watertown Highschool total project budget as provided by the district is $201,461,673.

== Sports ==
Watertown High has brought home several sports championships, as well as the state championships of 2007, 2009, 2018 and making it again in 2022, losing to St. Marys for boys' basketball. Watertown has had many state, Middlesex, and Division II championships from girls field hockey. Girls field hockey won the state tournament against Oakmont Regional High School in 2009; the final score was 1–0. They also beat Auburn in 2010 (1-0) and Oakmont again in 2011, and winning it in 2021, 2022, 2023. Watertown Field Hockey has 21 State Championships. . Watertown boys' hockey won the Division III State Championship in 2015. The Watertown Football team have 2 Conference Championships in 2015 and 2016. On October 21, 2015, the girls' field hockey team set a new high school national record by winning their 154th consecutive game.

== Watertown Field Hockey ==
Watertown Field Hockey has won 21 State Championships in the state of Massachusetts. As Of December 2023, The team has won 3 State Championships in a row twice: in 2009, 2010, and 2011 and again in 2021, 2022, and 2023. Coach Eileen Donahue has 750+ coaching wins with Watertown and is 1 of 8 coaches in U.S. History. Watertown Field Hockey is #1 nationally ranked for 184 games undefeated, #1 nationally ranked for 124 consecutive wins, and #1 national record for 41 consecutive shutouts.

== Notable alumni ==
- Bob Cappadona, former NFL running back
- Eliza Dushku, actress and model
- Mark Roopenian, NFL player
- George Yankowski, former Major League Baseball player for Philadelphia Athletics and Chicago White Sox
