= Tom Bleick =

American football player (1943–2022)

No. 25, 48
- Position: Defensive back

Personal information
- Born: March 21, 1943; Talladega, Alabama, U.S.
- Died: April 9, 2022 (aged 79)
- Listed height: 6 ft 2 in (1.88 m)
- Listed weight: 200 lb (91 kg)

Career information
- High school: Talladega
- College: Georgia Tech (1962–1965)
- NFL draft: 1965: 9th round, 126th overall pick
- AFL draft: 1965: Red Shirt 9th round, 65th overall pick

Career history
- Baltimore Colts (1966); Atlanta Falcons (1967); Alabama Hawks (1967)

Career NFL statistics
- Fumble recoveries: 1
- Stats at Pro Football Reference

Thomas Ward Bleick (Pronounced: BLICK) (March 21, 1943 – April 9, 2022) was an American professional football defensive back in the National Football League (NFL). He played for the Baltimore Colts and the Atlanta Falcons. He played collegiately for the Georgia Tech.

He died on April 9, 2022.
