= Jim Harris (American football) =

American football player (born 1943)

No. 78, 75
- Position: Defensive tackle

Personal information
- Born: February 24, 1943 (age 83); Lake Charles, Louisiana, U.S.
- Listed height: 6 ft 4 in (1.93 m)
- Listed weight: 280 lb (127 kg)

Career information
- High school: Berkeley (Berkeley, California)
- College: Utah State
- AFL draft: 1965: 7th round, 52nd overall pick

Career history
- New York Jets (1965–1967); Minnesota Vikings (1969)*; Bridgeport Jets (1969–1970)
- * Offseason or practice squad member only
- Stats at Pro Football Reference

James Harris Jr. (born February 24, 1943) is an American former professional football defensive tackle who played for the New York Jets of the American Football League (AFL). He played college football for the Utah State Aggies and was selected by the Jets in the seventh round of the 1965 AFL draft.

== Early life ==
James Harris Jr. was born on February 24, 1943, in Lake Charles, Louisiana. He attended Berkeley High School in Berkeley, California. In 1965, Harris said he barely graduated high school and afterwards had some legal issues.

== College career ==
Harris played two years of football at a junior college in California. In 1963, he transferred to Utah State University, where he was a two-year letterman for the Aggies from 1963 to 1964. He graduated from Utah State with a Bachelor of Sociology.

== Professional career ==
Harris was selected by the New York Jets in the seventh round, with the 52nd overall pick, of the 1965 AFL draft and by the Minnesota Vikings in the fourth round, with the 55th overall pick, of the 1965 NFL draft. He signed a one-year contract worth $40,000 with the Jets. Harris said he received a better offer from the Vikings but signed with the Jets because there is "no separation of races in the American Football League." He played in all 42 games, starting 40, for the Jets from 1965 to 1967, recording seven career sacks. He was released on September 2, 1968.

Harris signed with the Vikings on July 9, 1969. He was released on July 31, 1969, after he left the team.

Harris played for the Bridgeport Jets of the Atlantic Coast Football League from 1969 to 1970.
