= John Frechette =

American football player (1942–2014)

John David Frechette
Profile
- Position: Tackle

Personal information
- Born: December 19, 1942; Waltham, Massachusetts
- Died: July 29, 2014 (aged 71); Naples, Florida

Career information
- College: Boston College
- AFL draft: 1965: 11th round, 87 (by the Boston Patriots)th overall pick

Career history
- Boston Patriots (1965–1966); Green Bay Packers (1966–1967)

John David Frechette (December 19, 1942 – July 29, 2014) was a tackle in the National Football League.

Frechette was born John David Frechette on December 19, 1942, in Waltham, Massachusetts.

He played with the Boston Patriots and Green Bay Packers each for a season. He played at the collegiate level at Boston College.

After football, Frechette worked for Roadway Express and Owens-Illinois. He was on the board of trustees for the University of Toledo Medical Center and Toledo Cultural Arts Center during the 1990s.

Frechette died on July 29, 2014, in hospice care facility in Naples, Florida from complications of Alzheimer's disease. He was 71.
