= Jersey Tigers =

Defunct American football team

- Founded: 1970
- Folded: 1970
- League: Atlantic Coast Football League
- Based in: Elizabeth, New Jersey
- Arena: Williams High School Field

The Jersey Tigers were a minor league American football team based in Elizabeth, New Jersey. They played one season in the Atlantic Coast Football League (ACFL) in 1970 and played their home games at Williams High School Field. The team was partially formed from players of the Harrisburg Capitols and Quincy Giants, who left the league after the 1969 season. The Tigers were coached by Ken Carpenter, with assistants Ed Chlebek, Les Obie, Jack Von Bischoffshausen, and Bob Windish.
