= 1965 NFL draft =

National Football League draft

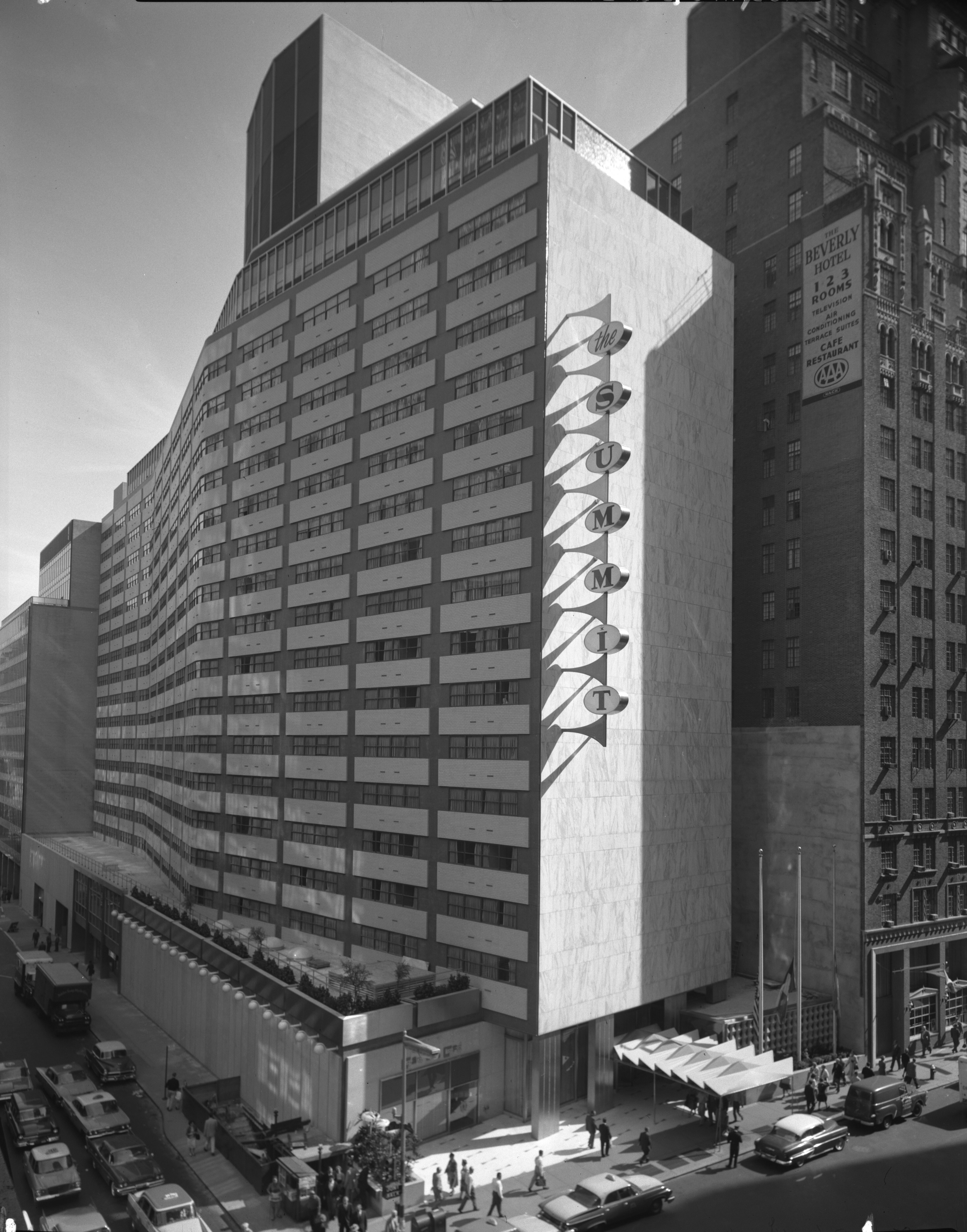
- The Summit Hotel (draft location), photographed in 1961

General information
- Date: November 28, 1964
- Time: 9:00 am EST
- Location: Summit Hotel in New York City

Overview
- 280 total selections in 20 rounds
- League: NFL
- First selection: Tucker Frederickson, RB; New York Giants
- Most selections (25): Green Bay Packers
- Fewest selections (14): Washington Redskins
- Hall of Famers: 5: LB Dick Butkus; RB Gale Sayers; QB Joe Namath; WR Fred Biletnikoff; LB Chris Hanburger

The 1965 NFL draft was held at the Summit Hotel in New York City on Saturday, November 28, 1964. The first player selected was Tucker Frederickson, back from Auburn, by the New York Giants.

The draft was marked by the failure of the St. Louis Cardinals to sign quarterback Joe Namath of Alabama, who instead committed to the New York Jets of the rival American Football League for a record contract amount. The AFL draft was held the same day.

== Player selections ==
= Pro Bowl	= AFL All-Star	= Hall of Famer

=== Round 1 ===
Pick #	NFL team	Player	Position	College
1	New York Giants	Tucker Frederickson	Back	Auburn
2	San Francisco 49ers	Ken Willard	Fullback	North Carolina
3	Chicago Bears ^{(Pick acquired from the Pittsburgh Steelers)}	Dick Butkus	Linebacker	Illinois
4	Chicago Bears	Gale Sayers	Halfback	Kansas
5	Dallas Cowboys	Craig Morton	Quarterback	California
6	Chicago Bears ^{(Pick acquired from the Washington Redskins)}	Steve DeLong	Tackle	Tennessee
7	Green Bay Packers ^{(Pick acquired from the Philadelphia Eagles)}	Donny Anderson	Halfback	Texas Tech
8	Minnesota Vikings	Jack Snow	Wide receiver	Notre Dame
9	Los Angeles Rams	Clancy Williams	Cornerback	Washington State
10	Green Bay Packers	Larry Elkins	Wide receiver	Baylor
11	Detroit Lions	Tom Nowatzke	Running back	Indiana
12	St. Louis Cardinals	Joe Namath	Quarterback	Alabama
13	San Francisco 49ers ^{(Pick acquired from the Cleveland Browns)}	George Donnelly	Back	Illinois
14	Baltimore Colts	Mike Curtis	Linebacker	Duke

=== Round 2 ===
Pick #	NFL team	Player	Position	College
15	Minnesota Vikings	Archie Sutton	Tackle	Illinois
16	San Francisco 49ers	Joe Cerne	Center	Northwestern
17	Cleveland Browns (pick acquired from Chicago Bears)	Jim Garcia	Tackle	Purdue
18	Pittsburgh Steelers	Roy Jefferson	Wide receiver	Utah
19	Dallas Cowboys	Malcolm Walker	Linebacker	Rice
20	Philadelphia Eagles	Ray Rissmiller	Tackle	Georgia
21	Washington Redskins	Bob Breitenstein	Tackle	Tulsa
22	Cleveland Browns	Gerry Bussell	Running back	Georgia Tech
23	Minnesota Vikings	Lance Rentzel	Wide receiver	Oklahoma
24	Green Bay Packers	Alphonse Dotson	Tackle	Grambling
25	Detroit Lions	Jerry Rush	Tackle	Michigan State
26	St. Louis Cardinals	Dave Simmons	Linebacker	Georgia Tech
27	Cleveland Browns	Walter Johnson	Defensive tackle	Cal State-Los Angeles
28	Baltimore Colts	Ralph Neely	Tackle	Oklahoma

=== Round 3 ===
Pick #	NFL team	Player	Position	College
29	San Francisco 49ers	Bob Schweickert	Back	Virginia Tech
30	San Francisco 49ers	Jim Norton	Tackle	Washington
31	New York Giants	Chuck Mercein	Running back	Yale
32	Cleveland Browns (pick acquired from Chicago Bears)	Bo Scott	Running back	Ohio State
33	New York Giants	Bob Timberlake	Quarterback	Michigan
34	Washington Redskins	Kent McCloughan	Back	Nebraska
35	Philadelphia Eagles	Al Nelson	Running back	Cincinnati
36	Baltimore Colts	Glenn Ressler	Center/Middle guard	Penn State
37	Los Angeles Rams	Fred Brown	End	Miami (FL)
38	Green Bay Packers	Allen Brown	End	Mississippi
39	Detroit Lions	Fred Biletnikoff	Wide receiver	Florida State
40	St. Louis Cardinals	Ray Ogden	End	Alabama
41	Cleveland Browns	Bobby Maples	Linebacker	Baylor
42	San Francisco 49ers	Jack Chapple	Linebacker	Stanford

=== Round 4 ===
Pick #	NFL team	Player	Position	College
43	New York Giants	Henry Carr	Running back	Arizona State
44	San Francisco 49ers	Larry Todd	Wide receiver	Arizona State
45	Chicago Bears	Jim Nance	Fullback	Syracuse
46	Detroit Lions	Tommy Myers	Quarterback	Northwestern
47	Dallas Cowboys	Jimmy Sidle	Running back	Auburn
48	Philadelphia Eagles	Fred Hill	Wide receiver	USC
49	Baltimore Colts	Marty Schottenheimer	Linebacker	Pittsburgh
50	Los Angeles Rams	Mike Strofolino	Linebacker	Villanova
51	Minnesota Vikings	Jim Whalen	End	Boston College
52	Green Bay Packers	Wally Mahle	Back	Syracuse
53	Dallas Cowboys	Bob Svihus	Tackle	USC
54	St. Louis Cardinals	Johnny Roland	Running back	Missouri
55	Minnesota Vikings	Jim Harris	Tackle	Utah State
56	Baltimore Colts	Dave Johnson	Wide receiver	San Jose State

=== Round 5 ===
Pick #	NFL team	Player	Position	College
57	Detroit Lions	Tommy Vaughn	Back	Iowa State
58	San Francisco 49ers	Dave McCormick	Tackle	Louisiana State
59	Green Bay Packers	Jim Harvey	Tackle	Mississippi
60	Los Angeles Rams	Frank Marchlewski	Center	Minnesota
61	Dallas Cowboys	Roger Pettee	Linebacker	Florida
62	New York Giants	Frank Lambert	End	Mississippi
63	Philadelphia Eagles	John Henderson	End	Michigan
64	Detroit Lions	Ed Flanagan	Center	Purdue
65	Los Angeles Rams	Doug Woodlief	End	Memphis State
66	Green Bay Packers	Doug Goodwin	Running back	Maryland-Eastern Shore
67	Detroit Lions	John Flynn	End	Oklahoma
68	St. Louis Cardinals	Bobby Bonds	Running back	San Jose State
69	Cleveland Browns	Bill Irwin	Tackle	Mississippi
70	Baltimore Colts	John McGuire	Wide receiver	Syracuse

=== Round 6 ===
Pick #	NFL team	Player	Position	College
71	Baltimore Colts	Bobby Felts	Running back	Florida A&M
72	Cleveland Browns	Arnie Simkus	Tackle	Michigan
73	Chicago Bears	Tony Carey	Running back	Notre Dame
74	Green Bay Packers	Richard Koeper	Tackle	Oregon State
75	Dallas Cowboys	Sonny Utz	Running back	Virginia Tech
76	Philadelphia Eagles	John Huarte	Quarterback	Notre Dame
77	Philadelphia Eagles	Gary Garrison	Wide receiver	San Diego State
78	Los Angeles Rams	Bill Harrison	End	Elon
79	Minnesota Vikings	Jim Grisham	Back	Oklahoma
80	Green Bay Packers	Bill Symons	Running back	Colorado
81	Detroit Lions	Earl Hawkins	Back	Emory & Henry
82	St. Louis Cardinals	Glen Ray Hines	Tackle	Arkansas
83	Cleveland Browns	Corwyn Aldredge	Wide receiver	Northwestern State (LA)
84	Baltimore Colts	Al Atkinson	Tackle	Villanova

=== Round 7 ===
Pick #	NFL team	Player	Position	College
85	Green Bay Packers	Jerry Roberts	Back	Baldwin–Wallace
86	Green Bay Packers	Roger Jacobazzi	Tackle	Wisconsin
87	Pittsburgh Steelers	Charley Browning	Back	Washington
88	Chicago Bears	Dick Gordon	Running back	Michigan State
89	Dallas Cowboys	Brig Owens	Quarterback	Cincinnati
90	Chicago Bears	Mickey Sutton	Back	Auburn
91	Philadelphia Eagles	Erwin Will	Tackle	Dayton
92	Detroit Lions	Greg Kent	Tackle	Utah
93	Los Angeles Rams	Tony Guillory	Guard	Lamar
94	Green Bay Packers	Junior Coffey	Running back	Washington
95	Detroit Lions	Bob Kowalkowski	Guard	Virginia
96	St. Louis Cardinals	Frank Roy	End	Utah
97	Cleveland Browns	Dale Lindsey	Linebacker	Western Kentucky
98	Baltimore Colts	John Kolocek	Tackle	Corpus Christi State

=== Round 8 ===
Pick #	NFL team	Player	Position	College
99	New York Giants	Willie Williams	Back	Grambling
100	Minnesota Vikings	John Hankinson	Quarterback	Minnesota
101	Chicago Bears	Brian Schweda	Tackle	Kansas
102	Pittsburgh Steelers	Bill Howley	End	Pittsburgh
103	Dallas Cowboys	Russell Wayt	Linebacker	Rice
104	Philadelphia Eagles	Al Piraino	Tackle	Wisconsin
105	Washington Redskins	Don Croftcheck	Guard	Indiana
106	Los Angeles Rams	Stan Dzura	Tackle	California
107	Minnesota Vikings	Jeff Jordon	Back	Tulsa
108	Green Bay Packers	Mike Shinn	End	Kansas
109	Detroit Lions	Larry Harbin	Back	Appalachian State
110	St. Louis Cardinals	John Meyer	Linebacker	Notre Dame
111	Cleveland Browns	Mike Howell	Defensive back	Grambling
112	Baltimore Colts	Roosevelt Davis	Tackle	Tennessee State

=== Round 9 ===
Pick #	NFL team	Player	Position	College
113	New York Giants	John Frick	End	Ohio
114	San Francisco 49ers	Wayne Swinford	Running back	Georgia
115	Pittsburgh Steelers	Tom Neville	Tackle	Mississippi State
116	Chicago Bears	Ken Ambrusko	Back	Maryland
117	Dallas Cowboys	Jim Zanios	Running back	Texas Tech
118	Washington Redskins	Jerry Smith	Tight end	Arizona State
119	Philadelphia Eagles	Floyd Hudlow	Back	Arizona
120	Minnesota Vikings	Frank McClendon	Tackle	Alabama
121	Los Angeles Rams	Ronnie Caveness	Linebacker	Arkansas
122	Green Bay Packers	Larry Bulaich	Back	Texas Christian
123	Detroit Lions	Bruce McLenna	Back	Hillsdale
124	St. Louis Cardinals	Jimmy Heidel	Back	Mississippi
125	Cleveland Browns	Gary Lane	Quarterback	Missouri
126	Baltimore Colts	Tom Bleick	Back	Georgia Tech

=== Round 10 ===
Pick #	NFL team	Player	Position	College
127	New York Giants	Ben Crenshaw	Back	Jackson State
128	San Francisco 49ers	Bob Cappadona	Running back	Northeastern
129	Chicago Bears	Dennis Murphy	Tackle	Florida
130	Pittsburgh Steelers	Dave Tobey	Center	Oregon
131	Dallas Cowboys	Gaylon McCullough	Center	Alabama
132	Philadelphia Eagles	Rick Redman	Center	Washington
133	Washington Redskins	Bob Briggs	Running back	Central State (OK)
134	Los Angeles Rams	Jim Burt	Running back	Western Kentucky
135	Minnesota Vikings	Jerald Schweiger	Tackle	Wisconsin–Superior
136	Green Bay Packers	Bud Marshall	Tackle	Stephen F. Austin
137	Detroit Lions	Frank Pennie	Tackle	Florida
138	St. Louis Cardinals	Chuck Drulis	End	Duke
139	Cleveland Browns	Pat Screen	Quarterback	Louisiana State
140	Baltimore Colts	George Harold	Back	Allen

=== Round 11 ===
Pick #	NFL team	Player	Position	College
141	New York Giants	Ernie Koy	Running back	Texas
142	San Francisco 49ers	Steve Mass	Tackle	Detroit
143	Pittsburgh Steelers	Frank Molden	Tackle	Jackson State
144	Chicago Bears	Frank Cornish	Tackle	Grambling
145	Dallas Cowboys	Jethro Pugh	Tackle	Elizabeth City State
146	Washington Redskins	Willie Adams	Guard	New Mexico State
147	Philadelphia Eagles	Louis James	Running back	Texas-El Paso
148	Minnesota Vikings	John Thomas	End	USC
149	Los Angeles Rams	Merlin Walet	Running back	McNeese State
150	Green Bay Packers	Jim Weatherwax	Tackle	Cal State-Los Angeles
151	Detroit Lions	Jim Kearney	Back	Prairie View A&M
152	St. Louis Cardinals	Bud French	Back	Alabama
153	Cleveland Browns	Olie Cordill	Back	Memphis State
154	Baltimore Colts	Lamar Richardson	Wide receiver	Fisk

=== Round 12 ===
Pick #	NFL team	Player	Position	College
155	New York Giants	Jim Carroll	Linebacker	Notre Dame
156	San Francisco 49ers	Dave Plump	Running back	Fresno State
157	Chicago Bears	Steve Cox	Tackle	South Carolina
158	Pittsburgh Steelers	Craig Lofquist	Back	Minnesota
159	Dallas Cowboys	Ernie Kellermann	Quarterback	Miami (OH)
160	Washington Redskins	John Strohmeyer	Tackle	Nebraska
161	Philadelphia Eagles	John Kuznieski	Running back	Purdue
162	Los Angeles Rams	Bob Werl	End	Miami (FL)
163	Minnesota Vikings	Mike Tilleman	Tackle	Montana
164	Green Bay Packers	Gene Jeter	Running back	Arkansas-Pine Bluff
165	Detroit Lions	Jim Moore	Linebacker	North Texas State
166	St. Louis Cardinals	Glen Sasser	End	North Carolina State
167	Cleveland Browns	Justin Canale	Guard	Mississippi State
168	Baltimore Colts	Ted Rodosovich	Guard	Cincinnati

=== Round 13 ===
Pick #	NFL team	Player	Position	College
169	New York Giants	Carl Lockhart	Defensive back	North Texas State
170	San Francisco 49ers	Gregg Schumacher	End	Illinois
171	Pittsburgh Steelers	J.R. Wilburn	Back	South Carolina
172	Chicago Bears	Dave Daniels	Tackle	Florida A&M
173	Dallas Cowboys	Jack Schraub	End	California
174	Washington Redskins	Biff Bracy	Running back	Duke
175	Philadelphia Eagles	John Fouse	End	Arizona
176	Minnesota Vikings	Dave Osborn	Back	North Dakota
177	Los Angeles Rams	Brent Berry	Tackle	San Jose State
178	Green Bay Packers	Roy Schmidt	Guard	Long Beach State
179	Detroit Lions	Jack Jacobson	Back	Oklahoma State
180	St. Louis Cardinals	Steve Murphy	Running back	Northwestern
181	Cleveland Browns	Henry Pickett	Running back	Baylor
182	Baltimore Colts	Bruce Airheart	Running back	North Dakota State

=== Round 14 ===
Pick #	NFL team	Player	Position	College
183	New York Giants	Olen Underwood	End	Texas
184	San Francisco 49ers	Frank Andruski	Running back	Utah
185	Chicago Bears	Dave Pivec	Wide receiver	Notre Dame
186	Pittsburgh Steelers	Jim (Cannonball) Butler	Back	Edward Waters
187	Dallas Cowboys	Garry Porterfield	Wide receiver	Tulsa
188	Philadelphia Eagles	Tom Longo	Back	Notre Dame
189	Washington Redskins	Dave Estrada	Running back	Arizona State
190	Los Angeles Rams	Bill Robertson	End	Austin
191	Minnesota Vikings	Max Leetzow	End	Idaho
192	Green Bay Packers	John Putnam	Running back	Drake
193	Detroit Lions	Larry Brown	Back	Oklahoma
194	St. Louis Cardinals	Mike Alford	Center	Auburn
195	Cleveland Browns	Dan Simrell	Quarterback	Toledo
196	Baltimore Colts	Jerry Fishman	Linebacker	Maryland

=== Round 15 ===
Pick #	NFL team	Player	Position	College
197	New York Giants	Mike Giers	Guard	USC
198	San Francisco 49ers	Joe Pabian	Tackle	West Virginia
199	Pittsburgh Steelers	John Carrell	Tackle	Texas Tech
200	Chicago Bears	Art Robinson	Back	Cal State-Los Angeles
201	Dallas Cowboys	Gene Foster	Back	Arizona State
202	Washington Redskins	Ben Baldwin	Back	Vanderbilt
203	Philadelphia Eagles	Otis Taylor	Wide receiver	Prairie View A&M
204	Minnesota Vikings	Phillip Morgan	Back	East Tennessee State
205	Los Angeles Rams	Marvin Davis	End	Wichita State
206	Green Bay Packers	Chuck Hurston	Tackle	Auburn
207	Detroit Lions	Wallace Dickey	End	Southwest Texas State
208	St. Louis Cardinals	Harlan Lane	Back	Baylor
209	Cleveland Browns	Larry Gagner	Tackle	Florida
210	Baltimore Colts	Roy Hilton	Running back	Jackson State

=== Round 16 ===
Pick #	NFL team	Player	Position	College
211	New York Giants	Tom Good	Back	Marshall
212	San Francisco 49ers	Dave Hettema	Tackle	New Mexico
213	Chicago Bears	Frank Pitts	Wide receiver	Southern
214	Pittsburgh Steelers	Doug Dusenbury	Kicker	Kansas State
215	Dallas Cowboys	Doug McDougal	End	Oregon State
216	Philadelphia Eagles	Jim Gray	Back	Toledo
217	Washington Redskins	Bob Reed	Guard	Tennessee A&I
218	Los Angeles Rams	Charlie Brown	Tackle	Tulsa
219	Minnesota Vikings	Paul Labinski	Tackle	St. John's (MN)
220	Green Bay Packers	Phil Vandersea	Running back	Massachusetts
221	Detroit Lions	John Smith	Tackle	Maryland-Eastern Shore
222	St. Louis Cardinals	Carl Silvestri	Back	Wisconsin
223	Cleveland Browns	Mel Anthony	Running back	Michigan
224	Baltimore Colts	Steve Tensi	Quarterback	Florida State

=== Round 17 ===
Pick #	NFL team	Player	Position	College
225	New York Giants	Dave Powless	Guard	Illinois
226	San Francisco 49ers	Len Frketich	End	Oregon State
227	Pittsburgh Steelers	Whit Canale	Running back	Tennessee
228	Chicago Bears	Tom LaFramboise	Quarterback	Louisville
229	Dallas Cowboys	Mitch Johnson	Tackle	UCLA
230	Washington Redskins	Gary Hart	End	Vanderbilt
231	Philadelphia Eagles	Dave Austin	End	Georgia Tech
232	Minnesota Vikings	Veran Smith	Back	Utah State
233	Los Angeles Rams	Ed Blecksmith	Back	USC
234	Green Bay Packers	Steve Clark	Kicker	Oregon State
235	Detroit Lions	Sonny Odom	Running back	Duke
236	St. Louis Cardinals	Mike Melinkovich	Tackle	Gray's Harbor J.C.
237	Cleveland Browns	John Boyette	Tackle	Clemson
238	Baltimore Colts	Rick Reichardt	Running back	Wisconsin

=== Round 18 ===
Pick #	NFL team	Player	Position	College
239	New York Giants	Mike Ciccolella	Linebacker	Dayton
240	San Francisco 49ers	Leon Standridge	End	San Diego State
241	Chicago Bears	Mike Schwager	Tackle	Northwestern
242	Pittsburgh Steelers	Bob Howard	Back	Stanford
243	Dallas Cowboys	Marty Amsler	Tackle	Evansville
244	Philadelphia Eagles	Bill Marcordes	End	Bradley
245	Washington Redskins	Chris Hanburger	Linebacker	North Carolina
246	Los Angeles Rams	Leo Lowery	Running back	Texas Tech
247	Minnesota Vikings	Rich Kotite	End	Wagner
248	Green Bay Packers	Jeff White	End	Texas Tech
249	Detroit Lions	Karl Sweetan	Quarterback	Wake Forest
250	St. Louis Cardinals	Ed McQuarters	Guard	Oklahoma
251	Cleveland Browns	Dick Arrington	Guard	Notre Dame
252	Baltimore Colts	Charley King	Running back	Purdue

=== Round 19 ===
Pick #	NFL team	Player	Position	College
253	New York Giants	Smith Reed	Back	Alcorn State
254	San Francisco 49ers	Dale Ford	Running back	Washington State
255	Pittsburgh Steelers	Lonnie Price	Back	Southwestern Louisiana
256	Chicago Bears	Lou Bobich	Kicker	Michigan State
257	Dallas Cowboys	Merv Rettenmund	Running back	Ball State
258	Washington Redskins	Roosevelt Ellerbe	Back	Iowa State
259	Philadelphia Eagles	Charley Englehart	Tackle	John Carroll
260	Minnesota Vikings	Ellis Johnson	Running back	Southeastern Louisiana
261	Los Angeles Rams	Billy Guy Anderson	Quarterback	Tulsa
262	Green Bay Packers	Len Sears	Tackle	South Carolina
263	Detroit Lions	Preston Love	Back	Nebraska
264	St. Louis Cardinals	Roy Shivers	Running back	Utah State
265	Cleveland Browns	Ed Orazen	Guard	Ohio State
266	Baltimore Colts	Barry Brown	End	Florida

=== Round 20 ===
Pick #	NFL team	Player	Position	College
267	New York Giants	John Torok	Quarterback	Arizona State
268	San Francisco 49ers	Dennis Duncan	Back	Louisiana College
269	Chicago Bears	Ralph Kurek	Running back	Wisconsin
270	Pittsburgh Steelers	Craig Fertig	Quarterback	USC
271	Dallas Cowboys	Don Barlow	Tackle	Kansas State
272	Philadelphia Eagles	Bobby Shann	End	Boston College
273	Baltimore Colts	Ray Johnson	Center	Prairie View A&M
274	Los Angeles Rams	Billy Scott	End	Northeast Oklahoma
275	Minnesota Vikings	Cosmo Iacavazzi	Back	Princeton
276	Green Bay Packers	Jim Chandler	Running back	Benedict
277	Detroit Lions	George Wilson	Quarterback	Xavier
278	St. Louis Cardinals	Tony Giacobazzi	End	Iowa
279	Cleveland Browns	Frank Goldberg	Linebacker	Central Michigan
280	Baltimore Colts	George Haffner	Quarterback	McNeese State

= Pro Bowler	= AFL All-Star	= Hall of Famer

== Hall of Famers ==
Five members of the Pro Football Hall of Fame were taken in the 1965 NFL draft:

- Gale Sayers, halfback from University of Kansas taken 1st round 4th overall by the Chicago Bears.

Inducted: Professional Football Hall of Fame class of 1977.

- Dick Butkus, linebacker from University of Illinois at Urbana–Champaign taken 1st round 3rd overall by the Chicago Bears.

Inducted: Professional Football Hall of Fame class of 1979.

- Joe Namath, quarterback from Alabama taken 1st round 12th overall by the St. Louis Cardinals but signed with the New York Jets.

Inducted: Professional Football Hall of Fame class of 1985.

- Fred Biletnikoff, wide receiver from Florida State taken 3rd round 39th overall by the Detroit Lions but signed with the Oakland Raiders.

Inducted: Professional Football Hall of Fame class of 1988.

- Chris Hanburger, linebacker from the University of North Carolina taken in the 18th round, 245th overall by the Washington Redskins.

Inducted: Professional Football Hall of Fame class of 2011.

== Notable undrafted players ==
^{†}	= Pro Bowler

Original NFL team	Player	Pos.	College	Notes
Chicago Bears	Brian Piccolo	RB	Wake Forest	
Chicago Bears	Ron Smith ^{†}	CB	Wisconsin	
Dallas Cowboys	Leon Crenshaw	DT	Tuskegee	
Dallas Cowboys	Rudy Kuechenberg	LB	Indiana	
Dallas Cowboys	Obert Logan	S	Trinity	
Dallas Cowboys	Dan Reeves	S	South Carolina	
Dallas Cowboys	Bill Sandeman	T	Pacific	
Dallas Cowboys	A.D. Whitfield	RB	North Texas	
Houston Oilers	Sammy Weir	WR	Arkansas State	
Minnesota Vikings	Earsell Mackbee	CB	Utah State	
Minnesota Vikings	Woody Peoples ^{†}	G	Grambling State	
Philadelphia Eagles	Jim Nettles	CB	Wisconsin	
Philadelphia Eagles	Harold Wells	LB	Purdue	
Pittsburgh Steelers	Charles Leigh	RB		
Pittsburgh Steelers	Jerry Simmons	WR	Bethune–Cookman	
Washington Redskins	Rich Badar	QB	Indiana	
Washington Redskins	Rickie Harris	CB	Arizona	

== See also ==
- 1965 American Football League draft
