= Jon Hohman =

American football player (1942–2018)

Profile
- Position: Guard

Personal information
- Born: October 23, 1942; Antigo, Wisconsin, U.S.
- Died: August 2, 2018 (aged 75); Appleton, Wisconsin, U.S.
- Listed height: 6 ft 1 in (1.85 m)
- Listed weight: 245 lb (111 kg)

Career information
- College: Wisconsin-Madison
- AFL draft: 1965: 8th round, 57th overall pick

Career history
- 1965–1966: Denver Broncos
- 1967–1973: Hamilton Tiger-Cats

Awards and highlights
- 2× Grey Cup champion (1967, 1972); CFL East All-Star (1972)
- Stats at Pro Football Reference

Jon Carl Hohman (October 23, 1942 – August 2, 2018) was a player in the American Football League (AFL) for the Denver Broncos in 1965 and 1966 as a guard. He played at the University of Wisconsin–Madison. He was also an all star and Grey Cup champion in the Canadian Football League (CFL) with the Hamilton Tiger-Cats.
