= Max Leetzow =

American football player (born 1943)

No. 81
- Positions: Defensive end, Defensive tackle

Personal information
- Born: September 17, 1943 (age 83); Lodi, California, U.S.
- Listed height: 6 ft 4 in (1.93 m)
- Listed weight: 240 lb (109 kg)

Career information
- High school: Los Altos (Los Altos, California)
- College: Idaho (1961–1964)
- NFL draft: 1965: 14th round, 191st overall pick
- AFL draft: 1965: 5th round, 35th overall pick

Career history

Playing
- Denver Broncos (1965–1966)

Coaching
- Las Vegas Cowboys (1969) Assistant coach

Career AFL statistics
- Sacks: 5
- Stats at Pro Football Reference

Max Arthur Leetzow (born September 17, 1943) is an American former professional football player who was a defensive end and defensive tackle for the Denver Broncos of the American Football League (AFL) from 1965 to 1966. He played college football for the Idaho Vandals.
