= Gerry Bussell =

American football player (born 1943)

No. 21, 22, 26
- Position: Defensive back

Personal information
- Born: September 7, 1943 (age 83); Middlesboro, Kentucky, U.S.
- Listed height: 6 ft 0 in (1.83 m)
- Listed weight: 190 lb (86 kg)

Career information
- High school: Englewood (Jacksonville, Florida)
- College: Georgia Tech (1961-1964)
- NFL draft: 1965: 2nd round, 22nd overall pick
- AFL draft: 1965: 9th round, 65th overall pick

Career history
- Denver Broncos (1965); Wheeling Ironmen (1966)

Career AFL statistics
- Kick/punt return yards: 127
- Stats at Pro Football Reference

Gerald Wheeler Bussell (born September 7, 1943) is an American former professional football defensive back who played in the American Football League (AFL) for the Denver Broncos. He played collegiately for the Georgia Tech football team.
