= Darryl Hill (American football) =

American football player

- Born: Darryl Andre Hill; October 21, 1943 (age 83); Washington, D.C.
- Occupation: Businessman
- Football career

Profile
- Position: Wide receiver

Career information
- High school: Gonzaga
- College: Xavier, Navy, Maryland

Darryl Andre Hill (born October 21, 1943, in Washington, D.C.) is an athlete and businessman; in 1963 he started with the University of Maryland football team as the first African-American football player in any of the southern athletic conferences composed of formerly segregated white institutions. (In that era, Maryland competed in the Atlantic Coast Conference, which at the time consisted only of such institutions.) The only black player on the team until his senior year, Hill set two records that still stand: total yards receiving, and most passes caught in a single game.

After college and graduate school, Hill was an early advocate of minority business enterprise. He became a ground-breaking businessman, with an entrepreneurial range that has included fine restaurants and green energy companies. In the 1990s, he also established business relations in Russia and China.

== Early life ==
Hill was the older of two children born to Kermit and Palestine Hill in Washington, D.C., where his mother raised him as a Catholic.

His family had a history as entrepreneurs. His father, Kermit, owned and operated Hill’s Transfer Company, which was one of the nation’s largest black-owned commercial trucking firms in the 1950s and 1960s. Both grandfathers were African American business owners. His great-grandfather, a Native American, was an entrepreneur and the first person of color to be hired by the Washington, D.C. Fire Department.

Hill attended public and parochial grade schools in D.C. and entered Jesuit Gonzaga College High School on an academic scholarship; he earned it by a competitive entrance examination. While at Gonzaga, he became the first African American to play football for the school, and in 1959 he led his team to the City Championship. In his senior year, Hill was named first team All DC Metropolitan in football. In track, he was Catholic League champion and record holder in the 400 yard dash and the long jump.

== College career ==
In 1960 at the age of 16, Hill attended Xavier University in Cincinnati, Ohio, on a football scholarship, where he was the leading scorer and ground gainer on the freshman football team.

In 1961, he received a congressional appointment to the United States Naval Academy. He was the first black man to play football at Navy and one of the first to play at any military academy. He starred on Navy’s plebe team where he was the favorite target for future Dallas Cowboys quarterback and Pro Football Hall of Fame member Roger Staubach. Leading his team in all-purpose yardage, Hill helped them to an 8-1 record.

After deciding to resign from the Naval Academy in 1962, Hill was recruited by future ESPN sports analyst Lee Corso, then an assistant coach at University of Maryland, to play for the Terps. Corso had been encouraged by Maryland head coach Tom Nugent to try to find a black athlete to play for his team. Hill was at first hesitant to transfer, saying, "I'm no Jackie Robinson. I just want to play football." When told that it might be couple of years before another black man would be recruited, Hill relented. When Hill enrolled into Maryland in September 1962, he became the first African American to receive an athletic scholarship to play sports for a major university in the South. Maryland was a member of the Atlantic Coast Conference (ACC). Neither it nor the other two major athletic conferences in the South, the Southeastern Conference and the Southwest Conference (now part of the Big 12), had any African Americans playing football for any of their teams.

After sitting out one year, Hill played his historic first game on September 21, 1963, at home against North Carolina State. Hill emerged as a top wide receiver for the team. He did not encounter too much racism from other players, but found that coaches and fans could be highly offensive. The Maryland team was protected by National Guard when it went out on the field at the University of South Carolina in Columbia. Nugent received a death threat by telephone and after the game, Hill's teammates helped him get through a crush of hostile fans. With the support of his teammates, Hill played out the season. When they traveled in the South, the team banded together, only staying at hotels and restaurants that would serve Hill. He finished with 43 catches, five short of the ACC record.

At the end of that season, the Terps played an away game against the Clemson University Tigers, who were led by coach Frank Howard. After Maryland announced that Hill was to play, Clemson threatened to leave the conference. Howard vowed that his team would not allow any black to play in their stadium, which was popularly known as "Death Valley" due to the power of their team. They threatened to pull out of the game if Maryland brought Hill. Hill’s mother, Palestine, was refused general entry to the ‘whites only’ stadium, but Clemson President Robert Edwards took Mrs. Hill to his private box. The game went on, and Darryl Hill set the ACC record in that game for pass receptions in a game, a record that stood for many years.

== Business career ==
After a short stint with the practice squad of the New York Jets, Hill entered graduate school and launched his business career. He worked to assist minorities to enter the business economy. In 1969, he became the first Executive Director of the Anacostia Economic Development Corporation in Washington, D.C. He next worked as Executive Director of the Washington, DC Business Development Center and the Greater Washington Business Center. Over ten years his organizations helped 2,500 minority-owned businesses with technical assistance, marketing and financing. He launched the first publicly owned MESBIC (Minority Enterprise Small Business Investment Company). President Richard Nixon appointed Hill as co-chairman of the National Minority Purchasing Council.

In 1977, Hill opened W.H. Bone & Company, one of the first black-owned mainstream, fine dining restaurants in the nation.

In 1982, Hill moved to Alameda, California. He founded Pacific Energy Corporation and Polaris Energy, which were early green energy businesses. Polaris Energy operated on both coasts and was one of the nation’s largest minority-owned energy companies.

In 1991, Hill turned his business sights to Russia after the break-up of the Soviet Union. He engaged in a number of business ventures, including purchasing a major optical company in the city of Novosibirsk. He took his company Northstar International to Central Siberia, where he formed a forestry joint venture with the government of the Republic of Buryatia. Hill and Northstar also organized a venture in Belem, Brazil to recover sunken timber from the Amazon River.

Hill also formed a joint venture with Ideal Packaging Company which is one of the largest paperboard packaging companies in China. He obtained the exclusive marketing rights for North America.

During the 1990s, Hill opened restaurants in Atlanta, Georgia, and Washington, D.C.

In 2003, Hill became Director of Major Gifts for the University of Maryland Department of Intercollegiate Athletics. During his tenure at Maryland, he completed one of the largest naming rights deals in the history of college athletics when he put together an agreement to name the football field Capital One Field.

Hill is Chairman of Kids Play USA Foundation, whose mission is to remove financial barriers from youth sports.

Darryl Hill is currently the Chairman and CEO of Tilstar, LLC and Green Bean, LLC which hold cannabis dispensary licenses in Maryland and California respectively.
