= 1964 Alabama Crimson Tide football team =

American college football season

1964 Alabama Crimson Tide football

AP poll national champion Coaches Poll national champion SEC champion

Orange Bowl, L 17–21 vs. Texas
- Conference: Southeastern Conference

Ranking
- Coaches: No. 1
- AP: No. 1
- Record: 10–1 (8–0 SEC)
- Head coach: Bear Bryant (7th season)
- Offensive coordinator: Howard Schnellenberger (4th season)
- Defensive coordinator: Gene Stallings (3rd season)
- Captains: Joe Namath; Ray Ogden
- Home stadium: Denny Stadium; Legion Field; Ladd Stadium

1964 Southeastern Conference football standings
	Conf.					Overall
Team	W		L		T	W		L		T
No. 1 Alabama $	8	–	0	–	0	10	–	1	–	0
Florida	4	–	2	–	0	7	–	3	–	0
Georgia	4	–	2	–	0	7	–	3	–	1
Kentucky	4	–	2	–	0	5	–	5	–	0
No. 7 LSU	4	–	2	–	1	8	–	2	–	1
Auburn	3	–	3	–	0	6	–	4	–	0
Ole Miss	2	–	4	–	1	5	–	5	–	1
Mississippi State	2	–	5	–	0	4	–	6	–	0
Vanderbilt	1	–	4	–	1	3	–	6	–	1
Tennessee	1	–	5	–	1	4	–	5	–	1
Tulane	1	–	5	–	0	3	–	7	–	0
$ – Conference champion; Georgia's game against Clemson and Tulane's game against Miami (FL) counted in the conference standings.; Rankings from AP Poll

The 1964 Alabama Crimson Tide football team (variously "Alabama", "UA" or "Bama") represented the University of Alabama in the 1964 NCAA University Division football season. It was the Crimson Tide's 70th overall and 31st season as a member of the Southeastern Conference (SEC). The team was led by head coach Bear Bryant, in his seventh year, and played their home games at Denny Stadium in Tuscaloosa, Legion Field in Birmingham and Ladd Stadium in Mobile, Alabama. They finished the season with ten wins and one loss (10–1 overall, 8–0 in the SEC), as SEC champions and with a loss to Texas (a team Arkansas defeated in Austin, TX) in the Orange Bowl. As the major wire services at that time awarded their national champions prior to the bowl season, Alabama was also recognized as national champions by the AP and UPI before their loss to Texas. After the bowl games, the Football Writers Association of America (FWAA) named the undefeated Arkansas Razorbacks as the national champions.

The Crimson Tide opened the season ranked in the No. 6 position with wins at Tuscaloosa against Georgia, against Tulane in Mobile and at Birmingham against Vanderbilt. After a victory over NC State in their first non-conference game of the season, Alabama defeated Tennessee in their first road game of the season at Neyland Stadium. The Crimson Tide then returned to Tuscaloosa where they defeated a Steve Spurrier-led Florida team on homecoming before their second road victory at Mississippi State at Jackson.

Alabama then defeated LSU in a newly expanded Legion Field and captured the SEC championship, and the next week defeated Georgia Tech in what was the final game of their annual series. In the annual Iron Bowl against Auburn, the Crimson Tide completed an undefeated regular season with their victory and accepted a bid to play Texas in the Orange Bowl. Although recognized as national champions at the conclusion of the regular season, Alabama closed the season with a loss to the Texas Longhorns in the Orange Bowl.

After the regular season in late November, quarterback Joe Namath was the first selection of the 1965 AFL draft, taken by the New York Jets. In addition to Namath, eleven other lettermen from the 1964 squad were selected in the 1965 NFL draft.

== Schedule ==
Date	Opponent	Rank	Site	TV	Result	Attendance	Source
September 19	Georgia	No. 6	Denny Stadium; Tuscaloosa, AL (rivalry)		W 31–3	42,525	
September 26	Tulane	No. 6	Ladd Stadium; Mobile, AL		W 36–6	30,011	
October 3	Vanderbilt	No. 4	Legion Field; Birmingham, AL		W 24–0	47,325	
October 10	NC State*	No. 3	Denny Stadium; Tuscaloosa, AL		W 21–0	37,827	
October 17	at Tennessee	No. 3	Neyland Stadium; Knoxville, TN (Third Saturday in October)		W 19–8	48,627	
October 24	No. 9 Florida^{†}	No. 3	Denny Stadium; Tuscaloosa, AL (rivalry)		W 17–14	43,200	
October 31	at Mississippi State	No. 3	Mississippi Veterans Memorial Stadium; Jackson, MS (rivalry)		W 23–6	44,350	
November 7	No. 8 LSU	No. 3	Legion Field; Birmingham, AL (rivalry)	NBC	W 17–9	67,749	
November 14	at No. 10 Georgia Tech*	No. 2	Grant Field; Atlanta, GA (rivalry)		W 24–7	53,505	
November 26	vs. Auburn	No. 2	Legion Field; Birmingham, AL (Iron Bowl)	NBC	W 21–14	67,436	
January 1, 1965	vs. No. 5 Texas*	No. 1	Miami Orange Bowl; Miami, FL (Orange Bowl)	NBC	L 17–21	72,647	
*Non-conference game; ^{†}Homecoming; Rankings from AP Poll released prior to the game; Source:

== Game summaries ==
=== Georgia ===
Team	1	2	3	4	Total
Georgia	0	3	0	0	3
• #6 Alabama	7	7	10	7	31

- Date: September 19
- Location: Denny Stadium
  Tuscaloosa, AL
- Game attendance: 42,525

To open the 1964 season, the Crimson Tide defeated Georgia 31–3 in what was the first game for Vince Dooley as head coach of the Bulldogs. After the Crimson Tide took a 7–0 lead on a five-yard Hudson Harris touchdown run in the first quarter, Georgia scored their only points early in the second on a 26-yard Robert Etter field goal. Alabama responded with the first of three Joe Namath touchdown runs from eight-yards out that gave the Crimson Tide a 14–3 halftime lead. Alabama closed the game with a 27-yard David Ray field goal and Namath touchdown runs of one and five-yards for the 31–3 victory. In the game, Namath completed 16 of 21 passes for 167 yards, ran for 55 yards, and scored three touchdowns. The 16 completions tied a school record with Harry Gilmer set during the 1946 season, and for his performance Namath was recognized as the AP's Back of the Week.

=== Tulane ===
Team	1	2	3	4	Total
Tulane	0	0	0	6	6
• #6 Alabama	0	10	10	16	36

- Date: September 26
- Location: Ladd Stadium
  Mobile, AL
- Game attendance: 30,011

At Mobile, the Crimson Tide defeated the Tulane Green Wave 36–6 in their annual Ladd Stadium game of the season. After a scoreless first quarter, Alabama took a 10–0 halftime lead after David Ray connected on a 22-yard field goal and Joe Namath scored on a one-yard touchdown run. Ray extended the Crimson Tide lead to 20–0 with his 33-yard field goal and 33-yard touchdown reception from Namath in the third quarter. In the fourth, Frank Canterbury scored on a five-yard touchdown run, and Tulane responded with their only points of the game on an eight-yard David East touchdown pass to Lanis O'Steen. Alabama then closed the game with a one-yard Namath run that made the final score 36–6.

=== Vanderbilt ===
Team	1	2	3	4	Total
Vanderbilt	0	0	0	0	0
• No. 4 Alabama	0	0	14	10	24

- Date: October 3
- Location: Legion Field
  Birmingham, AL
- Game attendance: 47,325

After their victory over Tulane, Alabama moved into the No. 4 position in the AP Poll prior to their game against Vanderbilt. In the first Legion Field game of the season, the Crimson Tide shut out the Commodores, 24–0, at Birmingham. After a scoreless first half, Alabama took a 14–0 third-quarter lead on a two-yard Joe Namath touchdown pass to Hudson Harris and on a 15-yard Namath run. They then closed the game with a nine-yard Namath touchdown pass to Tommy Tolleson and a 28-yard David Ray field goal in the fourth quarter that made the final score 24–0.

=== NC State ===
Team	1	2	3	4	Total
NC State	0	0	0	0	0
• #3 Alabama	0	7	7	7	21

- Date: October 10
- Location: Denny Stadium
  Tuscaloosa, AL
- Game attendance: 37,827

After their victory over Vanderbilt, Alabama moved up one position in the polls to the No. 3 spot prior to their first non-conference game of the season. In a game that saw starting quarterback Joe Namath injured in the second quarter, backup Steve Sloan rallied the Crimson Tide to a 21–0 victory over the NC State Wolfpack in Tuscaloosa. After a scoreless first quarter, Namath twisted his knee with just over 6:00 remaining in the half. Sloan entered the game and led Alabama on a 69-yard drive that culminated with his one-yard touchdown run to give Alabama a 7–0 halftime lead. The Crimson Tide then closed the game with a three-yard Steve Bowman touchdown run in the third and a 10-yard Sloan touchdown pass to Tommy Tolleson in the fourth that made the final score 21–0.

=== Tennessee ===
Third Saturday in October

Team	1	2	3	4	Total
• #3 Alabama	3	13	0	3	19
Tennessee	0	0	8	0	8

- Date: October 17
- Location: Neyland Stadium
  Knoxville, TN
- Game attendance: 48,627

In what was their first road game of the 1964 season, Alabama defeated the rival Tennessee Volunteers 19–8 at Neyland Stadium. David Ray gave the Crimson Tide an early 3–0 lead after he connected on a 30-yard field goal in the first quarter. Alabama then extended their lead to 16–0 at halftime with a pair of second-quarter touchdowns. The first came on a one-yard Steve Sloan run and the second after Wayne Cook blocked a Tennessee punt that Gaylon McCollough returned 22-yards for a touchdown. The Volunteers cut the Tide's lead in half to 16–8 with a seven-yard Hal Wantland touchdown run and two-point conversion in the third quarter. A 23-yard Ray field goal in the fourth quarter provided for the final 19–8 margin in the Alabama victory. Tom Fisher starred defensively for Tennessee with a blocked field goal, a blocked punt and an interception of a Sloan pass in defeat.

=== Florida ===
Team	1	2	3	4	Total
#9 Florida	0	7	7	0	14
• #3 Alabama	0	7	0	10	17

- Date: October 24
- Location: Denny Stadium
  Tuscaloosa, AL
- Game attendance: 43,200

As they entered their 1964 homecoming game against Florida, Alabama was ranked No. 3 and Florida No. 9 in the AP Poll. Against the Gators, Alabama rallied for a 17–14 comeback victory after they scored ten unanswered points in the fourth quarter. After a scoreless first quarter, Florida took a 7–0 second quarter lead when Steve Spurrier threw a nine-yard touchdown pass to Randy Jackson. Alabama responded with a one-yard Steve Bowman touchdown run later in the quarter that tied the game 7–7 at halftime. In the third, the Gators retook the lead with a three-yard John Feiber touchdown run before the Crimson Tide started their fourth quarter rally. In the final period, a 30-yard Bowman touchdown run tied the game and a 21-yard David Ray field goal with just 3:06 left in the game. Spurrier then led the Gators on a drive that stalled at the Tide's seven-yard line where James Hall missed a field goal to tie the game and preserved the 17–14 Alabama win.

=== Mississippi State ===
Team	1	2	3	4	Total
• #3 Alabama	3	6	14	0	23
Mississippi State	6	0	0	0	6

- Date: October 31
- Location: Mississippi Veterans Memorial Stadium
  Jackson, MS
- Game attendance: 44,350

At the Mississippi Veterans Memorial Stadium, a near sellout crowd saw David Ray connect on three field goals and Steve Bowman score on a pair of touchdown runs in this 23–6 win over the Mississippi State Bulldogs. The Bulldogs took an early 6–0 lead after a seven-yard Price Hodges touchdown run capped a 64-yard opening drive for Mississippi State. Ray field goals of 34, 40 and 20-yards that followed gave the Crimson Tide a 9–6 halftime lead. Alabama then held the Bulldogs to only four offensive plays in the third quarter and scored on a pair of one-yard Bowman touchdown runs for the 23–6 win.

=== LSU ===
Team	1	2	3	4	Total
#8 LSU	6	3	0	0	9
• #3 Alabama	7	0	0	10	17

- Date: November 7
- Location: Legion Field
  Birmingham, AL
- Game attendance: 67,749

As they entered their game against LSU, Alabama remained in the No. 3 position with the Tigers in the No. 8 position for a top ten matchup. Against the Tigers, Alabama rallied back for a 17–9 win that secured the 1964 SEC championship at Legion Field in Birmingham. LSU scored first and took an early 6–0 lead on a 13-yard Billy Ezell touchdown pass to Doug Moreau. The Crimson Tide responded later in the first quarter with a one-yard Steve Bowman touchdown run and took a 7–6 lead. Later, a 35-yard Moreau field goal in the second quarter gave the Tigers a 9–7 halftime lead that they retained through the fourth quarter when Alabama started their rally. In the fourth, the Tide took the lead with a 36-yard David Ray field goal and extended it to the final margin of 17–9 later in the quarter when Hudson Harris intercepted and Ezell pass and returned it 34-yards for the touchdown.

The game was also the dedication of 13,000 additional seats at Legion Field, and the 67,749 in attendance made it the largest crowd to ever see a football game in the state of Alabama at that time.

=== Georgia Tech ===
Team	1	2	3	4	Total
• #2 Alabama	0	14	3	7	24
#10 Georgia Tech	0	0	0	7	7

- Date: November 14
- Location: Grant Field
  Atlanta, GA
- Game attendance: 50,332

After their victory over LSU, Alabama moved into the No. 2 position and Georgia Tech, which exited the SEC following the 1963 season, into the No. 10 position in the AP poll prior to their game in Atlanta. In what was the final game of a series that stretched back nearly uninterrupted to the 1920s, Alabama defeated the Yellow Jackets 24–7 at Grant Field. After a scoreless first quarter, an injured Joe Namath entered the game for the Crimson Tide and led them to a pair of touchdowns in just a 1:20 of playing time. After Alabama recovered a Tech fumble at their 49-yard line, Namath threw a 48-yard completion to David Ray and on the next play took a 7–0 lead on a one-yard Steve Bowman touchdown run. The Crimson Tide then recovered an onside kick on the kickoff that ensued on the Jackets' 48-yard line. On the next play, Namath passed for 45-yards to Ray Ogden and then threw a three-yard touchdown pass to Ray for the 14–0 halftime lead.

After a 22-yard Ray field goal extended their lead to 17–0 in the third, Bowman scored on a four-yard fumble recovered for a touchdown in the fourth quarter. Georgia Tech did manage to avoid the shutout late in the fourth when Jerry Priestley threw a five-yard touchdown pass to Giles Smith that made the final score 24–7.

=== Auburn ===
Iron Bowl

Team	1	2	3	4	Total
Auburn	0	7	0	7	14
• #2 Alabama	6	0	8	7	21

- Date: November 26
- Location: Legion Field
  Birmingham, AL
- Game attendance: 67,436

In the week prior to their game against Auburn, Alabama retained their No. 2 ranking in the AP poll. In the annual Iron Bowl game, Alabama defeated the Tigers 21–14 land secured their second undefeated regular season under coach Bryant. The Crimson Tide took an early 6–0 lead after Steve Bowman recovered an Auburn fumble on a failed punt attempt and returned it 39-yards for a touchdown. The Tigers responded with a three-yard Tucker Frederickson touchdown run in the second quarter for a 7–6 halftime lead. Alabama then took a 14–7 lead in the third after Ray Ogden returned the opening kickoff 107 yards for a touchdown. An Auburn fumble then set up the final scoring drive for Alabama in the fourth that culminated in a 23-yard Joe Namath touchdown pass to Ray Perkins for a 21–7 lead. The Tigers responded later with a 16-yard Tom Bryan touchdown pass to Jimmy Sidle that made the final score 21–14.

=== Texas ===
Orange Bowl

Team	1	2	3	4	Total
• #5 Texas	7	14	0	0	21
#1 Alabama	0	7	7	3	17

- Date: January 1, 1965
- Location: Miami Orange Bowl
  Miami, FL
- Game attendance: 72,647

Immediately after their Iron Bowl victory, Alabama accepted a bid to play Texas in the Orange Bowl. Although they were recognized as undefeated national champions at the conclusion of the regular season, Alabama lost to the Longhorns 21–17 in the game and finished the season 10–1. Texas took a 14–0 lead after touchdowns were scored on a 79-yard Ernie Koy run in the first and on a 69-yard Jim Hudson pass to George Sauer Jr. in the second quarter. The Crimson Tide responded with a seven-yard Joe Namath touchdown pass to Wayne Trimble, but a two-yard Koy touchdown run made the halftime score 21–7 in favor of Texas. Alabama closed the game with a 20-yard Ray Perkins touchdown reception in the third and with a 26-yard David Ray field goal in the fourth, but lost 21–17.

== National championship claim ==
The NCAA recognizes consensus national champions as the teams that have captured a championship by way of one of the major polls since the 1950 college football season. After No. 1 Notre Dame was upset by USC in their final game of the season, it was speculated that Alabama would move into the top position in the polls and claim the 1964 national championship. As such, the Crimson Tide were voted into the No. 1 position in both the final AP and UPI polls and captured the national championship. On November 30, the final UPI poll was released with Alabama in the No. 1 position having claimed 33 first place votes and 333 total points in the poll ahead of No. 2 Arkansas. On December 1, the final AP poll was released with Alabama in the No. 1 position having claimed 34.5 first place votes ahead of the 11.5 first place votes awarded to No. 2 Arkansas.

Although officially recognized as national champions at the conclusion of the regular season, Alabama went on to lose against Texas in the Orange Bowl. Due to this embarrassment, and the increasing number of top ranked teams participating in bowl games, 1964 was one of the final years the AP released its final poll before the completion of bowl season. The AP would permanently switch to a final poll conducted after the bowl games starting with the 1968 season. Arkansas defeated Nebraska in the 1965 Cotton Bowl Classic and was the only major team that finished the entire season undefeated, to include a victory over Texas in Austin. Arkansas was voted national champions by the Football Writers Association of America (FWAA) and the Helms Athletic Foundation after the bowl games.

== NFL/AFL Draft ==
Several players that were varsity lettermen from the 1964 squad were drafted into the National Football League (NFL) and the American Football League (AFL) between the 1965 and 1967 drafts. These players included the following:

Year	Round	Overall	Player name	Position	NFL/AFL team
1965 NFL draft	1	12	Joe Namath	Quarterback	St. Louis Cardinals
1965 NFL draft	3	40	Ray Ogden	End	St. Louis Cardinals
1965 NFL draft	9	120	Frank McClendon	Tackle	Minnesota Vikings
1965 NFL draft	10	131	Gaylon McCullough	Center	Dallas Cowboys
1965 AFL draft	1	1	Joe Namath	Quarterback	New York Jets
1965 AFL draft	8	58	Ray Ogden	Tight end	Houston Oilers
1965 AFL draft	19	147	Frank McClendon	Tackle	Oakland Raiders
1966 NFL draft	11	156	Steve Sloan	Quarterback	Atlanta Falcons
1966 NFL draft	15	216	Tom Tolleson	Wide receiver	Atlanta Falcons
1966 NFL draft	15	226	Steve Bowman	Running back	New York Giants
1966 AFL draft	17	150	Tom Tolleson	Wide receiver	New York Jets
1966 AFL draft	20	179	Steve Bowman	Halfback	Oakland Raiders
1967 NFL/AFL draft	1	26	Leslie Kelley	Running back Linebacker	New Orleans Saints
1967 NFL/AFL draft	4	82	Louis Thompson	Defensive tackle	New York Giants
1967 NFL/AFL draft	4	91	Wayne Trimble	Defensive tackle	San Francisco 49ers
1967 NFL/AFL draft	9	230	Cecil Dowdy	Linebacker	Cleveland Browns

== Freshman squad ==
Prior to the 1972 NCAA University Division football season, NCAA rules prohibited freshmen from participating on the varsity team, and as such many schools fielded freshmen teams. For the 1964 season, the Alabama freshmen squad was coached by Sam Bailey and finished their season with a record of two wins and two losses (2–2). Alabama opened the season with a 14–7 loss to Mississippi State in a game that saw the Baby Tide turn the ball over seven times. The Bulldogs took a 7–0 lead in the first quarter on a one-yard Walter Pennebaker touchdown run. Alabama tied the game 7–7 in the third quarter on a 46-yard Ken Stabler touchdown pass to Dennis Homan; however, Stabler threw an interception later in the third to Alton Ellis that he returned 73 yards for the game-winning touchdown.

Two weeks later, Alabama won their first game of the season at New Orleans with a 13–6 victory over Tulane. The Baby Tide scored on their first offensive play when Stabler threw a 33-yard touchdown pass to Homan in the first quarter. Steve Davis kicked a 26-yard field goal on the next Alabama possession and another from 24 yards out in the third that made the score 13–0 in favor of the Tide. Paul Arnold scored Tulane's only points in the fourth quarter on a one-yard run and made the final score 13–6. In their third game, Alabama was shut out by Ole Miss, 14–0, at Hemingway Stadium. In the game, Rebel touchdowns were scored on a pair of Carr Walker touchdown passes. The first came in the opening period to Milie Haile and the second on a 59-yard pass to Carl Pope in the third quarter.

The next week, Alabama closed the season with a 17–0 victory over rival Auburn at Denny Stadium. The Baby Tide took a 14–0 first quarter lead on a 70-yard Homan punt return and on a one-yard Phil Schaeffer touchdown run that capped a 71-yard drive. Steve Davis provided for the final points of the game late in the fourth quarter n a 21-yard field goal that made the final score 21–0.

== Personnel ==
=== Varsity letter winners ===
Player	Hometown	Position
Mickey Andrews	Ozark, Alabama	Halfback
Tim Bates	Tarrant, Alabama	Linebacker
Steve Bowman	Pascagoula, Mississippi	Fullback
Frank Canterbury	Birmingham, Alabama	Halfback
Wayne Cook	Montgomery, Alabama	Tight end
Paul Crane	Prichard, Alabama	Center
Tim Davis	Columbus, Georgia	Placekicker
Cecil Dowdy	Cherokee, Alabama	Offensive tackle
Ron Durby	Memphis, Tennessee	Tackle
Grady Elmore	Ozark, Alabama	Halfback
Wayne Freeman	Fort Payne, Alabama	Guard
Buddy French	Decatur, Alabama	Placekicker
Jim Fuller	Fairfield, Alabama	Tackle
Creed Gilmer	Birmingham, Alabama	Defensive end
Hudson Harris	Tarrant, Alabama	Halfback
Mike Hopper	Huntsville, Alabama	End
Dan Kearley	Talladega, Alabama	Defensive tackle
Leslie Kelley	Cullman, Alabama	Fullback
Frankie McClendon	Guntersville, Alabama	Tackle
Gaylon McCollough	Enterprise, Alabama	Center
Ken Mitchell	Florence, Alabama	Guard
John Mosley	Thomaston, Alabama	Halfback
Joe Namath	Beaver Falls, Pennsylvania	Quarterback
Ray Ogden	Jesup, Georgia	Halfback
Ray Perkins	Petal, Mississippi	End
David Ray	Phenix City, Alabama	Placekicker
Jackie Sherrill	Biloxi, Mississippi	Fullback
Jim Simmons	Piedmont, Alabama	Tackle
Steve Sloan	Cleveland, Tennessee	Quarterback
Charles Stephens	Thomasville, Alabama	End
Tommy Tolleson	Talladega, Alabama	End
Wayne Trimble	Cullman, Alabama	Quarterback
Larry Wall	Valley, Alabama	Fullback

=== Coaching staff ===
Name	Position	Seasons at Alabama	Alma mater
Bear Bryant	Head coach	7	Alabama (1936)
Sam Bailey	Assistant coach	7	Ouachita Baptist (1949)
Ken Donahue	Assistant coach	1	Tennessee (1951)
Jim Goostree	Assistant coach	8	Tennessee (1952)
Clem Gryska	Assistant coach	5	Alabama (1948)
Dude Hennessey	Assistant coach	5	Kentucky (1955)
Pat James	Assistant coach	7	Kentucky (1951)
Carney Laslie	Assistant coach	7	Alabama (1934)
Ken Meyer	Assistant coach	2	Denison (1950)
Mal Moore	Assistant coach	1	Alabama (1962)
Dee Powell	Assistant coach	2	Texas A&M (1957)
Hayden Riley	Assistant coach	7	Alabama (1948)
Howard Schnellenberger	Assistant coach	4	Kentucky (1956)
Jimmy Sharpe	Assistant coach	2	Alabama (1962)
Gene Stallings	Assistant coach	7	Texas A&M (1957)
Richard Williamson	Assistant coach	1	Alabama (1963)
