= 1964 Tennessee Volunteers football team =

American college football season

1964 Tennessee Volunteers football
- Conference: Southeastern Conference
- Record: 4–5–1 (1–5–1 SEC)
- Head coach: Doug Dickey (1st season)
- Home stadium: Neyland Stadium

1964 Southeastern Conference football standings
| | Conf. | | | | | Overall |
| Team | W | | L | | T | W | | L | | T |
|---|---|---|---|---|---|---|---|---|---|---|
| No. 1 Alabama $ | 8 | – | 0 | – | 0 | 10 | – | 1 | – | 0 |
| Florida | 4 | – | 2 | – | 0 | 7 | – | 3 | – | 0 |
| Georgia | 4 | – | 2 | – | 0 | 7 | – | 3 | – | 1 |
| Kentucky | 4 | – | 2 | – | 0 | 5 | – | 5 | – | 0 |
| No. 7 LSU | 4 | – | 2 | – | 1 | 8 | – | 2 | – | 1 |
| Auburn | 3 | – | 3 | – | 0 | 6 | – | 4 | – | 0 |
| Ole Miss | 2 | – | 4 | – | 1 | 5 | – | 5 | – | 1 |
| Mississippi State | 2 | – | 5 | – | 0 | 4 | – | 6 | – | 0 |
| Vanderbilt | 1 | – | 4 | – | 1 | 3 | – | 6 | – | 1 |
| Tennessee | 1 | – | 5 | – | 1 | 4 | – | 5 | – | 1 |
| Tulane | 1 | – | 5 | – | 0 | 3 | – | 7 | – | 0 |
$ – Conference champion; Georgia's game against Clemson and Tulane's game against Miami (FL) counted in the conference standings.; Rankings from AP Poll

The 1964 Tennessee Volunteers football team (variously "Tennessee", "UT" or the "Vols") represented the University of Tennessee in the 1964 NCAA University Division football season. Playing as a member of the Southeastern Conference (SEC), the team was led by head coach Doug Dickey, in his first year, and played their home games at Neyland Stadium in Knoxville, Tennessee. They finished the season with a record of four wins, five losses and one tie (4–5–1 overall, 1–5–1 in the SEC). The Volunteers offense scored 80 points while the defense allowed 121 points.

== Schedule ==
| Date | Opponent | Site | TV | Result | Attendance | Source |
|---|---|---|---|---|---|---|
| September 19 | Chattanooga* | Neyland Stadium; Knoxville, TN | | W 10–6 | 28,000 | |
| September 26 | at No. 8 Auburn | Legion Field; Birmingham, AL (rivalry) | | L 0–3 | 46,000 | |
| October 3 | vs. Mississippi State | Crump Stadium; Memphis, TN | | W 14–13 | 24,609 | |
| October 10 | Boston College* | Neyland Stadium; Knoxville, TN | | W 16–14 | 28,000 | |
| October 17 | No. 3 Alabama | Neyland Stadium; Knoxville, TN (Third Saturday in October) | | L 8–19 | 48,627 | |
| October 24 | at No. 7 LSU | Tiger Stadium; Baton Rouge, LA | NBC | T 3–3 | 59,000 | |
| November 7 | at No. 7 Georgia Tech | Grant Field; Atlanta, GA (rivalry) | | W 22–14 | 50,763 | |
| November 14 | Ole Miss^{†} | Neyland Stadium; Knoxville, TN (rivalry) | | L 0–30 | 46,000 | |
| November 21 | Kentucky | Neyland Stadium; Knoxville, TN (rivalry) | | L 7–12 | 42,000 | |
| November 28 | at Vanderbilt | Dudley Field; Nashville, TN (rivalry) | | L 0–7 | 30,000 | |
*Non-conference game; ^{†}Homecoming; Rankings from AP Poll released prior to the game

== Team players drafted into the NFL ==
| Player | Position | Round | Pick | NFL club |
|---|---|---|---|---|
| Steve DeLong | Defensive end | 1 | 6 | Chicago Bears |
| Whit Canale | Defensive end | 17 | 227 | Pittsburgh Steelers |

== Awards and honors ==
- Steve DeLong, Outland Trophy
