= 1964 Auburn Tigers football team =

American college football season

1964 Auburn Tigers football
- Conference: Southeastern Conference
- Record: 6–4 (3–3 SEC)
- Head coach: Ralph Jordan (14th season)
- Home stadium: Cliff Hare Stadium; Legion Field

1964 Southeastern Conference football standings
	Conf.					Overall
Team	W		L		T	W		L		T
No. 1 Alabama $	8	–	0	–	0	10	–	1	–	0
Florida	4	–	2	–	0	7	–	3	–	0
Georgia	4	–	2	–	0	7	–	3	–	1
Kentucky	4	–	2	–	0	5	–	5	–	0
No. 7 LSU	4	–	2	–	1	8	–	2	–	1
Auburn	3	–	3	–	0	6	–	4	–	0
Ole Miss	2	–	4	–	1	5	–	5	–	1
Mississippi State	2	–	5	–	0	4	–	6	–	0
Vanderbilt	1	–	4	–	1	3	–	6	–	1
Tennessee	1	–	5	–	1	4	–	5	–	1
Tulane	1	–	5	–	0	3	–	7	–	0
$ – Conference champion; Georgia's game against Clemson and Tulane's game against Miami (FL) counted in the conference standings.; Rankings from AP Poll

The 1964 Auburn Tigers football team represented Auburn University in the 1964 NCAA University Division football season. It was the Tigers' 73rd overall and 31st season as a member of the Southeastern Conference (SEC). The team was led by head coach Ralph "Shug" Jordan, in his 14th year, and played their home games at Cliff Hare Stadium in Auburn and Legion Field in Birmingham, Alabama. They finished with a record of six wins and four losses (6–4 overall, 3–3 in the SEC).

== Schedule ==
Date	Opponent	Rank	Site	Result	Attendance	Source
September 19	Houston*	No. 8	Cliff Hare Stadium; Auburn, AL	W 30–0	25,000	
September 26	Tennessee	No. 8	Legion Field; Birmingham, AL (rivalry)	W 3–0	46,000	
October 3	at Kentucky	No. 7	McLean Stadium; Lexington, KY	L 0–20	37,500	
October 10	Chattanooga*		Cliff Hare Stadium; Auburn, AL	W 33–12	31,000	
October 17	Georgia Tech*		Legion Field; Birmingham, AL (rivalry)	L 3–7	57,000	
October 24	Southern Miss*		Cliff Hare Stadium; Auburn, AL	W 14–7	22,000	
October 31	at No. 10 Florida		Florida Field; Gainesville, FL (rivalry)	L 0–14	47,100	
November 7	Mississippi State^{†}		Cliff Hare Stadium; Auburn, AL	W 12–3	45,000	
November 14	Georgia		Cliff Hare Stadium; Auburn, AL (rivalry)	W 14–7	43,000	
November 26	vs. No. 2 Alabama		Legion Field; Birmingham, AL (Iron Bowl)	L 14–21	68,000	
*Non-conference game; ^{†}Homecoming; Rankings from AP Poll released prior to the game

== Roster ==
- Tucker Frederickson
