= Larry Gagner =

American football player (born 1943)

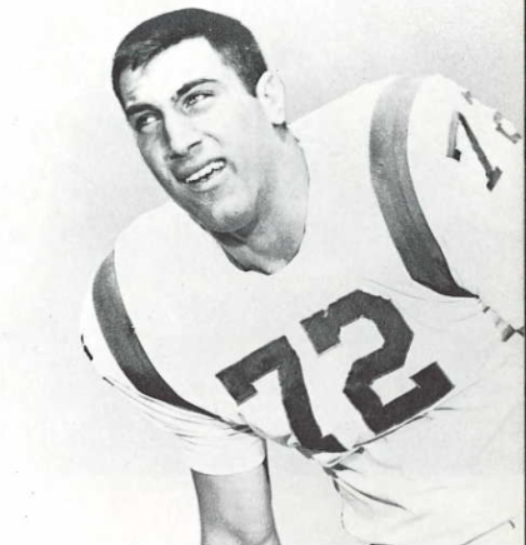
- Gagner from 1965 Seminole yearbook

No. 79
- Position: Guard

Personal information
- Born: December 30, 1943 (age 82); Cleveland, Ohio, U.S.
- Listed height: 6 ft 3 in (1.91 m)
- Listed weight: 240 lb (109 kg)

Career information
- High school: Seabreeze (Daytona Beach, Florida)
- College: Florida (1962-1965)
- NFL draft: 1966: 2nd round, 19th overall pick
- AFL draft: 1966: 3rd round, 18th overall pick

Career history
- Pittsburgh Steelers (1966–1969); New York Giants (1971)*; Denver Broncos (1971)*; Kansas City Chiefs (1972); Jacksonville Sharks (1974); Jacksonville Express (1975)
- * Offseason or practice squad member only

Awards and highlights
- First-team All-American (1965); 2× First-team All-SEC (1964, 1965); University of Florida Athletic Hall of Fame

Career NFL statistics
- Games played: 59
- Games started: 51
- Fumble recoveries: 2
- Stats at Pro Football Reference

Lawrence Joseph Gagner (born December 30, 1943) is an American former professional football player who was an offensive lineman in the National Football League (NFL) for parts of five seasons during the 1960s and 1970s. Gagner was born in Cleveland, Ohio and grew up near Daytona Beach, Florida, where he was a multi-sport all-state athlete at Seabreeze High School. He played college football for the Florida Gators, playing several positions on offense and defense under head coach Ray Graves. Gagner became a regular starter on the Gators' offensive line during his junior year in 1964. He was a two-time All-SEC guard and was a consensus All-American at that position during his senior year in 1965.

Gagner was a second-round pick in the 1966 NFL draft by the Pittsburgh Steelers of the NFL and became a part of the Steelers' offensive line rotation during his rookie year. He started 14 games with Pittsburgh and was named a team captain in 1969. His professional career was derailed by a near-fatal automobile accident in March 1970 near his home in Ormond Beach, Florida. Gagner was unable to play during the 1970 and 1971 seasons and finally returned to the field as a backup for the Kansas City Chiefs during the 1972 preseason. However, continued health issues hindered his performance, and he left the Chiefs prior to the regular season and did not sign with a team in 1973. He made a final return to action with the Jacksonville Sharks of the World Football League in 1974 and was a reserve lineman for the team for two years, after which the league folded. Gagner drew interest from some NFL and Canadian Football League teams before the 1976 season, but after failing two team physicals with lingering injuries, he decided to retire from football at the age of 32.

After football, Gagner worked in several professions before becoming a successful artist. He lives and works in Tampa, Florida.

== Early life ==
Gagner was born in Cleveland, Ohio in 1943. He attended Seabreeze High School in Daytona Beach, Florida, where he was a standout two-way prep player for the Seabreeze Sandcrabs high school football team. The Sandcrabs posted a 19–2–1 overall win–loss record during Gagner's junior and senior years, and laid claim to the state football championship his junior year. In 2007, forty-six years after he graduated from high school, the Florida High School Athletic Association (FHSAA) named Gagner to its "All-Century Team," recognizing him as one of the thirty-three greatest Florida high school football players of the last 100 years.

== College career ==
Gagner accepted an athletic scholarship to attend the University of Florida in Gainesville, Florida, and played for coach Ray Graves' Florida Gators football teams from 1963 to 1965. During his college career, Gagner primarily played offensive guard, but also appeared at center, defensive tackle, and linebacker due to his combination of strength and speed. He was a first-team All-Southeastern Conference (SEC) selection in 1964 and 1965, and a first-team All-American in 1965. As a senior lineman, Gagner participated in the 1966 Sugar Bowl, the Gators' first-ever major bowl appearance. He graduated with a bachelor's degree in fine arts in 1967, and was later inducted into the University of Florida Athletic Hall of Fame as a "Gator Great."

== Professional career ==
=== Pittsburgh Steelers ===
Gagner was selected by the Pittsburgh Steelers in the second round (nineteenth pick overall) of the 1966 NFL Draft, and also by the Miami Dolphins in the third round (18th pick overall) of the 1966 American Football League (AFL) Draft. Gagner chose to sign with the Steelers for the then-staggering sum of $150,000, and played regularly at guard from 1966 until 1969, starting 14 games, regularly serving as a team captain, and being called Pittsburgh's "most consistent" offensive lineman.

=== Automobile accident ===
In March 1970, Gagner was involved in a near-fatal traffic accident in his Porsche 911 while driving intoxicated near his home in Ormond Beach, Florida. He suffered multiple serious injuries, including a broken arm, lacerations that required over 30 stitches, a chipped left femur head, and a badly dislocated left hip, leaving him hospitalized for two months. He reported to the Steelers' training camp in July, but after one practice, the team doctor determined that Gagner had not recovered from his injuries and recommended that he postpone his return. Though the team put him on a physical therapy program, his hip continued to give him problems, and Gagner missed the entire 1970 season. He was traded to the New York Giants in January 1971 but did not pass a physical exam, so the Giants put him on waivers. He signed with the Denver Broncos, who hoped that Gagner would be able to contribute after further rehabilitation. However, he never recovered sufficiently to make the active roster and missed the entire 1971 season as well, after which he became a free agent.

=== Later career ===
In 1972, Gagner finally returned to the field as a reserve lineman for the Kansas City Chiefs. However, he was frustrated by his inability to perform as he had before the accident and decided to retire during the 1973 preseason. Gagner came out of retirement in 1974, playing in a backup role for the Jacksonville franchise of the World Football League (WFL) for two truncated seasons. The WFL folded in 1975, and Gagner signed a free agent contract with the NFL's expansion Tampa Bay Buccaneers in March 1976. However, he did not pass a team physical and was released. He signed with the New Orleans Saints in May 1976, but was cut in early in the preseason. In one last attempt to continue his career, Gagner tried out for the Toronto Argonauts of the Canadian Football League, where the team doctor warned him that returning to the field would accelerate the degeneration of his injured hip. Following this advice, Gagner finally decided to retire.

Overall, Larry Gagner appeared in 60 regular season NFL games.

== Life after football ==
After football, Gagner worked several different jobs, including as a taxi driver, security guard, and substitute teacher, before deciding to make use of his college degree in commercial art. He and his wife Doris live in the Seminole Heights neighborhood of Tampa, Florida, where he is a working artist, mainly in painting and sculpture.

== See also ==
- 1965 College Football All-America Team
- Florida Gators football, 1960–69
- List of Florida Gators football All-Americans
- List of Florida Gators in the NFL draft
- List of Kansas City Chiefs players
- List of Pittsburgh Steelers players
- List of University of Florida alumni
- University of Florida Athletic Hall of Fame
