= 1964 Georgia Bulldogs football team =

American college football season

1964 Georgia Bulldogs football

Sun Bowl champion

Sun Bowl, W 7–0 vs. Texas Tech
- Conference: Southeastern Conference
- Record: 7–3–1 (4–2 SEC)
- Head coach: Vince Dooley (1st season)
- Defensive coordinator: Erk Russell (1st season)
- Home stadium: Sanford Stadium

1964 Southeastern Conference football standings
| | Conf. | | | | | Overall |
| Team | W | | L | | T | W | | L | | T |
|---|---|---|---|---|---|---|---|---|---|---|
| No. 1 Alabama $ | 8 | – | 0 | – | 0 | 10 | – | 1 | – | 0 |
| Florida | 4 | – | 2 | – | 0 | 7 | – | 3 | – | 0 |
| Georgia | 4 | – | 2 | – | 0 | 7 | – | 3 | – | 1 |
| Kentucky | 4 | – | 2 | – | 0 | 5 | – | 5 | – | 0 |
| No. 7 LSU | 4 | – | 2 | – | 1 | 8 | – | 2 | – | 1 |
| Auburn | 3 | – | 3 | – | 0 | 6 | – | 4 | – | 0 |
| Ole Miss | 2 | – | 4 | – | 1 | 5 | – | 5 | – | 1 |
| Mississippi State | 2 | – | 5 | – | 0 | 4 | – | 6 | – | 0 |
| Vanderbilt | 1 | – | 4 | – | 1 | 3 | – | 6 | – | 1 |
| Tennessee | 1 | – | 5 | – | 1 | 4 | – | 5 | – | 1 |
| Tulane | 1 | – | 5 | – | 0 | 3 | – | 7 | – | 0 |
$ – Conference champion; Georgia's game against Clemson and Tulane's game against Miami (FL) counted in the conference standings.; Rankings from AP Poll

The 1964 Georgia Bulldogs football team represented the University of Georgia as a member of the Southeastern Conference (SEC) during the 1964 NCAA University Division football season. Led by first-year head coach Vince Dooley, the Bulldogs compiled an overall record of 7–3–1 with a mark of 4–2 in conference play, placing in a three-way tie for second in the SEC. Georgia played home games at Sanford Stadium in Athens, Georgia.

== Schedule ==
| Date | Opponent | Site | TV | Result | Attendance | Source |
|---|---|---|---|---|---|---|
| September 19 | at No. 6 Alabama | Denny Stadium; Tuscaloosa, AL (rivalry) | | L 3–31 | 42,525 | |
| September 26 | at Vanderbilt | Dudley Field; Nashville, TN (rivalry) | | W 7–0 | 19,098 | |
| October 3 | at South Carolina* | Carolina Stadium; Columbia, SC (rivalry) | | T 7–7 | 17,994 | |
| October 10 | Clemson (Note: Georgia's game against Clemson counted in the SEC standings.) | Sanford Stadium; Athens, GA (rivalry) | | W 19–7 | 31,000 | |
| October 17 | No. 10 Florida State* | Sanford Stadium; Athens, GA | | L 14–17 | 31,000 | |
| October 24 | Kentucky^{†} | Sanford Stadium; Athens, GA | | W 21–7 | 39,000 | |
| October 31 | North Carolina* | Sanford Stadium; Athens, GA | | W 24–8 | 40,000 | |
| November 7 | vs. No. 9 Florida | Gator Bowl Stadium; Jacksonville, FL (rivalry) | | W 14–7 | 48,000 | |
| November 14 | at Auburn | Cliff Hare Stadium; Auburn, AL (rivalry) | | L 7–14 | 43,000 | |
| November 28 | Georgia Tech* | Sanford Stadium; Athens, GA (rivalry) | | W 7–0 | 52,000 | |
| December 26 | vs. Texas Tech* | Sun Bowl; El Paso, TX (Sun Bowl) | CBS | W 7–0 | 23,292 | |
*Non-conference game; ^{†}Homecoming; Rankings from AP Poll released prior to the game

== Roster ==
1964 Georgia Bulldogs football team roster
Players
Coaches
Offense

| Pos. | # | Name | Class |
|---|---|---|---|
| QB | | Lynn Hughes |
| QB | | Preston Ridlehuber | Jr |

Defense

| Pos. | # | Name | Class |

Special teams

| Pos. | # | Name | Class |

Head coach

- Vince Dooley

Coordinators/assistant coaches

- Erk Russell
  (Defensive coordinator)
- Hootie Ingram
  (Defensive backs coach)

Legend

- (C) Team captain
- (S) Suspended
- (I) Ineligible
- Injured
- Redshirt

- Not listed (missing number/class/position): Bob Etter, Frank Richter, Barry Wilson
