= 1964 Mississippi State Bulldogs football team =

American college football season

1964 Mississippi State Bulldogs football
- Conference: Southeastern Conference
- Record: 4–6 (2–5 SEC)
- Head coach: Paul E. Davis (3rd season)
- Home stadium: Scott Field; Mississippi Veterans Memorial Stadium

1964 Southeastern Conference football standings
	Conf.					Overall
Team	W		L		T	W		L		T
No. 1 Alabama $	8	–	0	–	0	10	–	1	–	0
Florida	4	–	2	–	0	7	–	3	–	0
Georgia	4	–	2	–	0	7	–	3	–	1
Kentucky	4	–	2	–	0	5	–	5	–	0
No. 7 LSU	4	–	2	–	1	8	–	2	–	1
Auburn	3	–	3	–	0	6	–	4	–	0
Ole Miss	2	–	4	–	1	5	–	5	–	1
Mississippi State	2	–	5	–	0	4	–	6	–	0
Vanderbilt	1	–	4	–	1	3	–	6	–	1
Tennessee	1	–	5	–	1	4	–	5	–	1
Tulane	1	–	5	–	0	3	–	7	–	0
$ – Conference champion; Georgia's game against Clemson and Tulane's game against Miami (FL) counted in the conference standings.; Rankings from AP Poll

The 1964 Mississippi State Bulldogs football team was an American football team that represented Mississippi State University as a member of the Southeastern Conference (SEC) during the 1964 NCAA University Division football season. In their third year under head coach Paul E. Davis, the Bulldogs compiled an overall record of 4–6, with a mark of 2–5 in conference play, and finished eighth in the SEC.

== Schedule ==
Date	Opponent	Site	Result	Attendance	Source
September 19	at Texas Tech*	Jones Stadium; Lubbock, TX	L 7–21	38,000	
September 26	Florida	Mississippi Veterans Memorial Stadium; Jackson, MS	L 13–16	40,000	
October 3	vs. Tennessee	Crump Stadium; Memphis, TN	L 13–14	24,609	
October 10	Tulane	Scott Field; Starkville, MS	W 17–6	16,000	
October 17	Southern Miss*	Scott Field; Starkville, MS	W 48–7	19,000	
October 24	Houston*	Scott Field; Starkville, MS	W 18–13	27,000	
October 31	No. 3 Alabama	Mississippi Veterans Memorial Stadium; Jackson, MS (rivalry)	L 6–23	45,700	
November 7	at Auburn	Cliff Hare Stadium; Auburn, AL	L 3–12	45,000	
November 14	at No. 9 LSU	Tiger Stadium; Baton Rouge, LA (rivalry)	L 10–14	52,000	
December 5	at Ole Miss	Hemingway Stadium; Oxford, MS (Egg Bowl)	W 20–17	30,000	
*Non-conference game; Rankings from AP Poll released prior to the game
