= 1964 All-SEC football team =

American college football all-star team

The 1964 All-SEC football team consists of American football players selected to the All-Southeastern Conference (SEC) chosen by various selectors for the 1964 NCAA University Division football season.

== Offensive selections ==
=== Ends ===
- Charles Casey, Florida (AP-1, UPI-2)
- Doug Moreau, LSU (AP-1, UPI-2)
- Tommy Tolleson, Alabama (AP-2, UPI-3)
- Tommy Inman, Miss. St. (AP-2, UPI-3)

=== Tackles ===
- Jim Wilson, Georgia (AP-1, UPI-1)
- Ray Rissmiller, Georgia (AP-2, UPI-1)
- George Rice, LSU (AP-1, UPI-3)
- Gary Hart, Vanderbilt (AP-2)
- Dennis Murphy, Florida (UPI-3)

=== Guards ===
- Wayne Freeman, Alabama (AP-1, UPI-2)
- Larry Gagner, Florida (AP-1)
- Remi Prudhomme, LSU (UPI-1)
- Stan Hindman, Ole Miss (AP-2, UPI-2)
- Justin Canale, Miss. St. (AP-2, UPI-3)

=== Centers ===
- Richard Granier, LSU (AP-1)
- Gaylon McCullough, Alabama (AP-2, UPI-2)
- Ruffin Rodrigue, LSU (UPI-3)

=== Quarterbacks ===
- Joe Namath, Alabama (AP-1, UPI-1)
- Steve Spurrier, Florida (College Football Hall of Fame) (UPI-3)

=== Halfbacks ===
- Rodger Bird, Kentucky (AP-1, UPI-1)
- Mike Dennis, Ole Miss (AP-1, UPI-2)
- Jim Weatherly, Ole Miss (AP-2, UPI-2)
- Marcus Rhoden, Miss. St. (AP-2)
- Joe Labrubbo, LSU (UPI-3)
- David Ray, Alabama (UPI-3)

=== Fullbacks ===
- Larry Dupree, Florida (AP-2, UPI-1)
- Steve Bowman, Alabama (AP-1, UPI-3)
- Hoyle Granger, Miss. St. (AP-2, UPI-2)

== Defensive selections ==
=== Ends ===
- Rick Kestner, Kentucky (AP-1, UPI-1 [as E])
- Allen Brown, Ole Miss (AP-1, UPI-1 [as E])
- Lynn Matthews, Florida (AP-2)
- Barry Wilson, Georgia (AP-2)

=== Tackles ===
- Dan Kearley, Alabama (AP-1, UPI-2 [as T])
- Jack Thornton, Auburn (AP-1)
- Tom Neville, Miss. St. (AP-2, UPI-2 [as T])
- George Patton, Georgia (AP-2)

=== Middle Guards ===
- Steve DeLong, Tennessee (AP-1, UPI-1 [as G])
- Pat Watson, Miss. St. (AP-2, UPI-1 [as C])
- Bill Richbourg, Florida (AP-1, UPI-3 [as G])
- Leon Verriere, Tulane (AP-2)

=== Linebackers ===
- Mike Vincent, LSU (AP-1)
- Bill Cody, Auburn (AP-1)
- Frank Emanuel, Tennessee (AP-2)
- Paul Crane, Alabama (AP-2)

=== Backs ===
- Tucker Frederickson, Auburn (College Football Hall of Fame) (AP-1, UPI-1 [as HB])
- Bruce Bennett, Florida (AP-1)
- Wayne Swinford, Georgia (AP-1)
- Steve Sloan, Alabama (AP-2, UPI-2 [as QB])
- Allen Trammell, Florida (AP-2)
- Dave Malone, Vanderbilt (AP-2)

== Key ==
AP = Associated Press

UPI = United Press International

Bold = Consensus first-team selection by both AP and UPI. The AP selection had two platoons, but UPI's did not.

== See also ==
- 1964 College Football All-America Team
