= 1964 Tulane Green Wave football team =

American college football season

1964 Tulane Green Wave football
- Conference: Southeastern Conference
- Record: 3–7 (1–5 SEC)
- Head coach: Tommy O'Boyle (3rd season)
- Home stadium: Tulane Stadium

1964 Southeastern Conference football standings
	Conf.					Overall
Team	W		L		T	W		L		T
No. 1 Alabama $	8	–	0	–	0	10	–	1	–	0
Florida	4	–	2	–	0	7	–	3	–	0
Georgia	4	–	2	–	0	7	–	3	–	1
Kentucky	4	–	2	–	0	5	–	5	–	0
No. 7 LSU	4	–	2	–	1	8	–	2	–	1
Auburn	3	–	3	–	0	6	–	4	–	0
Ole Miss	2	–	4	–	1	5	–	5	–	1
Mississippi State	2	–	5	–	0	4	–	6	–	0
Vanderbilt	1	–	4	–	1	3	–	6	–	1
Tennessee	1	–	5	–	1	4	–	5	–	1
Tulane	1	–	5	–	0	3	–	7	–	0
$ – Conference champion; Georgia's game against Clemson and Tulane's game against Miami (FL) counted in the conference standings.; Rankings from AP Poll

The 1964 Tulane Green Wave football team was an American football team that represented Tulane University as a member of the Southeastern Conference (SEC) during the 1964 NCAA University Division football season. In its third year under head coach Tommy O'Boyle, the Green Wave compiled a 3–7 record (1–5 in conference games, finished in last place in the SEC, and was outscored by a total of 147 to 79.

The team gained an average of 73.4 rushing yards and 95.7 passing yards per game. On defense, it gave up an average of 147.0 rushing yards and 103.4 passing yards per game. Tulane's individual statistical leaders included quarterback Dave East with 846 passing yards, George Smith with 307 rushing yards, and Lou Campomenosi with 242 receiving yards.

The team played home games at Tulane Stadium in New Orleans.

== Schedule ==
Date	Opponent	Site	Result	Attendance	Source
September 19	at No. 4 Texas*	Texas Memorial Stadium; Austin, TX	L 0–31	60,000	
September 26	vs. No. 6 Alabama	Ladd Memorial Stadium; Mobile, AL	L 6–36	30,011	
October 10	at Mississippi State	Scott Field; Starkville, MS	L 6–17	16,000	
October 17	Ole Miss	Tulane Stadium; New Orleans, LA (rivalry)	L 9–14	22,000	
October 24	at Georgia Tech*	Grant Field; Atlanta, GA	L 6–7	45,129	
October 31	VMI*	Tulane Stadium; New Orleans, LA	W 25–6	18,000	
November 6	at Miami (FL) (Note: Tulane's game against Miami counted in the SEC standings.)	Miami Orange Bowl; Miami, FL	L 0–21	33,855	
November 14	at Vanderbilt	Dudley Field; Nashville, TN	W 7–2		
November 21	No. 8 LSU	Tulane Stadium; New Orleans, LA (Battle for the Rag)	L 3–13	55,000	
November 28 (Note: The home game versus Duke was originally scheduled for October 3, but postponed to the end of the season due to the approach of Hurricane Hilda, which made landfall in Louisiana just before the original scheduled kickoff time.)	Duke*	Tulane Stadium; New Orleans, LA	W 17–0	12,000	
*Non-conference game; Rankings from AP Poll released prior to the game
