= 1965 Sugar Bowl =

American college football game

- 31st Sugar Bowl
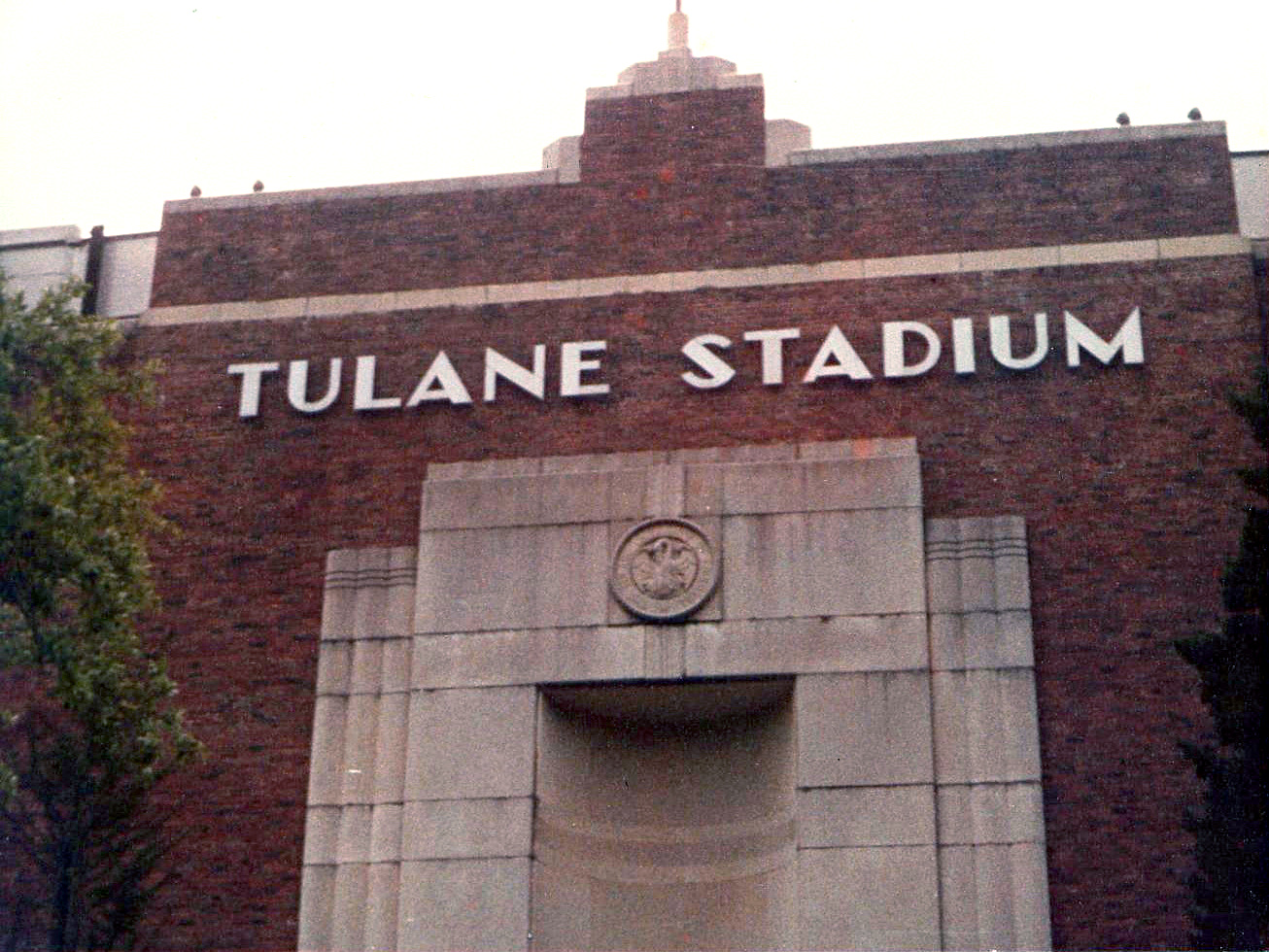
- Tulane Stadium in New Orleans, Louisiana, hosted the Sugar Bowl.
LSU Tigers	Syracuse Orangemen
(7–2–1)	(7–3)
SEC	Independent
13	10
Head coach: Charles McClendon	Head coach: Ben Schwartzwalder
AP / Coaches; 7 / 7	AP / Coaches; NR / 12
	1	2	3	4	Total
LSU	2	0	8	3	13
Syracuse	10	0	0	0	10
- Date: January 1, 1965
- Season: 1964
- Stadium: Tulane Stadium
- Location: New Orleans, Louisiana
- Favorite: LSU by 5½ points
- Referee: Francis P. Brennan (ECAC) (split crew between ECAC & SEC)
- Attendance: 65,000

United States TV coverage
- Network: NBC
- Announcers: Bill Flemming, Terry Brennan

The 1965 Sugar Bowl was the 31st edition of the college football bowl game, played at Tulane Stadium in New Orleans, Louisiana, on Friday, January 1. Part of the 1964–65 bowl season, it matched the seventh-ranked LSU Tigers of the Southeastern Conference (SEC) and the unranked independent Syracuse Orangemen. Favored LSU rallied in the second half to win, 13–10. The game is notable for being the first time a racially integrated team played in the Sugar Bowl since the 1956 Sugar Bowl. Syracuse had two black players, Jim Nance and Floyd Little.

== Game summary ==
Syracuse opened the scoring in the first quarter with a 23-yard Roger Smith field goal. When Syracuse got the ball next, LSU's defense forced a safety, as lineman George Rice tackled halfback Floyd Little in the end zone, making it 3–2. Syracuse's Bradlee Clarke returned a blocked punt 28 yards for a touchdown, and after a scoreless second quarter, Syracuse led 10–2 at halftime.

In the third quarter, LSU reserve quarterback Billy Ezell threw a 57-yard touchdown pass to Doug Moreau, and converted for two points on a pass play to tie the game at ten. With under four minutes remaining, Moreau kicked a 28-yard field goal to put LSU ahead, 13–10, which was the final score, and he was named Sugar Bowl MVP.

=== Scoring ===
First quarter

- SYR – Roger Smith 23-yard field goal
- LSU – Safety, Floyd Little tackled in end zone by George Rice
- SYR – Bradlee Clarke 28-yard run after blocked punt (Smith kick)

Second quarter

No scoring

Third quarter

- LSU – Doug Moreau 57-yard pass from Billy Ezell (Joe LaBruzzo pass from Ezell)

Fourth quarter

- LSU – Moreau 28-yard field goal

== Statistics ==
Statistics	LSU	Syracuse
First downs	11	10
Rushing	46–161	35–151
Passing	6–15–1	8–20–1
Passing yards	114	52
Total offense	61–275	55–203
Punts–avg.	9–36.2	6–37.5
Fumbles–lost	4–0	3–1
Turnovers	1	2
Penalties–yards	4–46	5–55
