= 1964 Ole Miss Rebels football team =

American college football season

1964 Ole Miss Rebels football

Bluebonnet Bowl, L 7–14 vs. Tulsa
- Conference: Southeastern Conference

Ranking
- Coaches: No. 20
- Record: 5–5–1 (2–4–1 SEC)
- Head coach: Johnny Vaught (18th season)
- Home stadium: Hemingway Stadium; Mississippi Veterans Memorial Stadium

1964 Southeastern Conference football standings
	Conf.					Overall
Team	W		L		T	W		L		T
No. 1 Alabama $	8	–	0	–	0	10	–	1	–	0
Florida	4	–	2	–	0	7	–	3	–	0
Georgia	4	–	2	–	0	7	–	3	–	1
Kentucky	4	–	2	–	0	5	–	5	–	0
No. 7 LSU	4	–	2	–	1	8	–	2	–	1
Auburn	3	–	3	–	0	6	–	4	–	0
Ole Miss	2	–	4	–	1	5	–	5	–	1
Mississippi State	2	–	5	–	0	4	–	6	–	0
Vanderbilt	1	–	4	–	1	3	–	6	–	1
Tennessee	1	–	5	–	1	4	–	5	–	1
Tulane	1	–	5	–	0	3	–	7	–	0
$ – Conference champion; Georgia's game against Clemson and Tulane's game against Miami (FL) counted in the conference standings.; Rankings from AP Poll

The 1964 Ole Miss Rebels football team represented the University of Mississippi during the 1964 NCAA University Division football season. The Rebels were led by 18th-year head coach Johnny Vaught and played their home games at Hemingway Stadium in Oxford, Mississippi. The team competed as members of the Southeastern Conference, finishing in seventh. The Rebels were the preseason favorite to win the national title, starting the season ranked first in the nation. The Rebels soon fell out of the rankings, however, after a loss to Kentucky in the second game of the year (the AP Poll ranked only the top 10 teams from 1962 to 1967). The Rebels' fall to seventh place in the conference was the school's first finish outside the conference's top four since 1950. They finished the regular season with a 5–4–1 record, tied for 20th in the final Coaches Poll, conducted before bowl season. They were invited to the 1964 Bluebonnet Bowl, where they lost to Tulsa.

== Schedule ==
Date	Opponent	Rank	Site	Result	Attendance	Source
September 19	Memphis State*	No. 1	Hemingway Stadium; Oxford, MS (rivalry)	W 30–0	35,000	
September 26	Kentucky	No. 1	Mississippi Veterans Memorial Stadium; Jackson, MS	L 21–27	35,000	
October 3	Houston*^{†}		Hemingway Stadium; Oxford, MS	W 31–9	24,000	
October 10	at Florida		Florida Field; Gainesville, FL	L 14–30	47,003	
October 17	at Tulane		Tulane Stadium; New Orleans, LA (rivalry)	W 14–9	22,000	
October 24	at Vanderbilt		Dudley Field; Nashville, TN (rivalry)	T 7–7	15,500	
October 31	at No. 9 LSU		Tiger Stadium; Baton Rouge, LA (rivalry)	L 10–11	68,000	
November 7	Tampa*		Hemingway Stadium; Oxford, MS	W 36–0	6,300	
November 14	at Tennessee		Neyland Stadium; Knoxville, TN (rivalry)	W 30–0	46,000	
December 5	Mississippi State		Hemingway Stadium; Oxford, MS (Egg Bowl)	L 17–20	30,000	
December 19	vs. Tulsa*		Rice Stadium; Houston, TX (Bluebonnet Bowl)	L 7–14	52,500	
*Non-conference game; ^{†}Homecoming; Rankings from AP Poll released prior to the game

== Personnel ==
1964 Ole Miss Rebels football team roster
Players			Coaches
Offense: Pos. / # / Name / Class; RB / / Mike Dennis / Jr	Defense: Pos. / # / Name / Class	Special teams: Pos. / # / Name / Class	Head coach: Johnny Vaught; Coordinators/assistant coaches Legend: (C) Team captain; (S) Suspended; (I) Ineligible; Injured; Redshirt
