= 1964 Sun Bowl =

American college football game

Georgia Bulldogs	Texas Tech Red Raiders
(6–3–1)	(6–3-1)
SEC	SWC
7	0
Head coach: Vince Dooley	Head coach: J. T. King
	1	2	3	4	Total
Georgia	0	7	0	0	7
Texas Tech	0	0	0	0	0
- Date: December 26, 1964
- Season: 1964
- Stadium: Sun Bowl
- Location: El Paso, Texas
- MVP: QB Preston Ridlehuber (Georgia)
- Referee: McDuff Simpson (SWC; split crew: SWC, SEC)
- Attendance: 23,292

United States TV coverage
- Network: NBC

The 1964 Sun Bowl was a college football postseason bowl game that featured the Texas Tech Red Raiders and the Georgia Bulldogs.

== Background ==
In Vince Dooley's first year with the Bulldogs, he had guided them to a 2nd-place finish in the Southeastern Conference, with a highlight win over 9th ranked Florida, earning him SEC Coach of the Year honors. The Red Raiders had finished 4th in the Southwest Conference, an improvement from the 6th and 8th places that they had finished the past four seasons. This was Georgia's first Sun Bowl appearance and Texas Tech's fifth appearance. This was the first Sun Bowl televised on television. Both teams had averaged over 300 yards on the season on offense.

== Game summary ==
A 52-yard pass from Preston Ridlehuber to Fred Barber proved to be the pivotal play of the game, as it got Georgia into Tech territory. Three plays later, Frank Lankewicz scored on a touchdown plunge from two yards out to give Georgia a 7-0 lead. The Red Raiders had two chances in the final nine minutes, both ending unsuccessfully. Tech drove all the way to the 18 yard line of the Bulldogs, but they could not convert on fourth down. The Red Raiders got the ball back quickly after a Ridlehuber fumble at the 17. But quarterback Tom Wilson's pass was intercepted soon after by Vance Evans, and Tech never threatened after that. Georgia fumbled twice in Red Raider territory and failed on fourth down from the Tech one, but they stymied the Red Raider offense on their way to victory.

== Aftermath ==
The Red Raiders have returned to the Sun Bowl three times since this game, but none since 1993. Georgia returned to the Sun Bowl in 1969, and in 1985.

== Statistics ==
Statistics	Texas Tech	Georgia
First downs	7	17
Rushing yards	32	245
Passing yards	96	84
Total offense	128	329
Return yards	76	39
Passes intercepted	1	0
Fumbles–lost	1–0	3–3
Punts–average	8–37.3	4–38.0
Penalties–yards	8–37	7–45
