= Ray Ogden =

American football player (1942–2019)

No. 28, 29, 38
- Position: Tight end

Personal information
- Born: September 2, 1942; Jesup, Georgia, U.S.
- Died: October 17, 2019 (aged 77); Brunswick, Georgia, U.S.
- Listed height: 6 ft 5 in (1.96 m)
- Listed weight: 225 lb (102 kg)

Career information
- High school: Jesup
- College: Alabama (1961-1964)
- NFL draft: 1965: 3rd round, 40th overall pick
- AFL draft: 1965: 8th round, 58th overall pick

Career history
- St. Louis Cardinals (1965–1966); New Orleans Saints (1967); Atlanta Falcons (1967–1968); Chicago Bears (1969–1971)

Awards and highlights
- National champion (1964)

Career NFL statistics
- Receptions: 53
- Receiving yards: 885
- Touchdowns: 4
- Stats at Pro Football Reference

Raymond Douglas Ogden (September 2, 1942 – October 17, 2019) was a former professional American football tight end. He played college football at Alabama, where he won a national championship in the 1964 season. He played seven seasons for the St. Louis Cardinals (1965–1966), the New Orleans Saints (1967), the Atlanta Falcons (1967–1968), and the Chicago Bears (1969–1971) in the National Football League (NFL).
