= 1964 LSU Tigers football team =

American college football season

1964 LSU Tigers football

Sugar Bowl champion

Sugar Bowl, W 13–10 vs. Syracuse
- Conference: Southeastern Conference

Ranking
- Coaches: No. 7
- AP: No. 7
- Record: 8–2–1 (4–2–1 SEC)
- Head coach: Charles McClendon (3rd season)
- Home stadium: Tiger Stadium

1964 Southeastern Conference football standings
	Conf.					Overall
Team	W		L		T	W		L		T
No. 1 Alabama $	8	–	0	–	0	10	–	1	–	0
Florida	4	–	2	–	0	7	–	3	–	0
Georgia	4	–	2	–	0	7	–	3	–	1
Kentucky	4	–	2	–	0	5	–	5	–	0
No. 7 LSU	4	–	2	–	1	8	–	2	–	1
Auburn	3	–	3	–	0	6	–	4	–	0
Ole Miss	2	–	4	–	1	5	–	5	–	1
Mississippi State	2	–	5	–	0	4	–	6	–	0
Vanderbilt	1	–	4	–	1	3	–	6	–	1
Tennessee	1	–	5	–	1	4	–	5	–	1
Tulane	1	–	5	–	0	3	–	7	–	0
$ – Conference champion; Georgia's game against Clemson and Tulane's game against Miami (FL) counted in the conference standings.; Rankings from AP Poll

The 1964 LSU Tigers football team was an American football team that represented Louisiana State University (LSU) as a member of the Southeastern Conference (SEC) during the 1964 NCAA University Division football season. In their third year under head coach Charles McClendon, the Tigers compiled an overall record of 8–2–1, with a conference record of 4–2–1, and finished third in the SEC.

== Schedule ==
Date	Opponent	Rank	Site	TV	Result	Attendance	Source
September 19	Texas A&M*		Tiger Stadium; Baton Rouge, LA (rivalry)		W 9–6	68,000	
September 26	at Rice*		Rice Stadium; Houston, TX		W 3–0	64,000	
October 10	North Carolina*		Tiger Stadium; Baton Rouge, LA		W 20–3	68,000	
October 17	at Kentucky	No. 9	McLean Stadium; Lexington, KY		W 27–7	38,000	
October 24	Tennessee^{†}	No. 7	Tiger Stadium; Baton Rouge, LA		T 3–3	59,000	
October 31	Ole Miss	No. 9	Tiger Stadium; Baton Rouge, LA (rivalry)		W 11–10	68,000	
November 7	at No. 3 Alabama	No. 8	Legion Field; Birmingham, AL (rivalry)	ABC	L 9–17	67,749	
November 14	Mississippi State	No. 9	Tiger Stadium; Baton Rouge, LA (rivalry)		W 14–10	52,000	
November 21	at Tulane	No. 8	Tulane Stadium; New Orleans, LA (Battle for the Rag)		W 13–3	55,000	
December 5 (Note: The game versus Florida was originally scheduled for October 3, but was postponed until December 5 due to the threat of Hurricane Hilda on the original game date.)	Florida	No. 7	Tiger Stadium; Baton Rouge, LA (rivalry)		L 6–20	65,000	
January 1, 1965	vs. Syracuse*	No. 7	Tulane Stadium; New Orleans, LA (Sugar Bowl)	NBC	W 13–10	65,000	
*Non-conference game; ^{†}Homecoming; Rankings from AP Poll released prior to the game
