= Seabreeze High School =

Public high school in Daytona Beach, Florida, United States

Coordinates: 29.2658134°N 81.030333°W

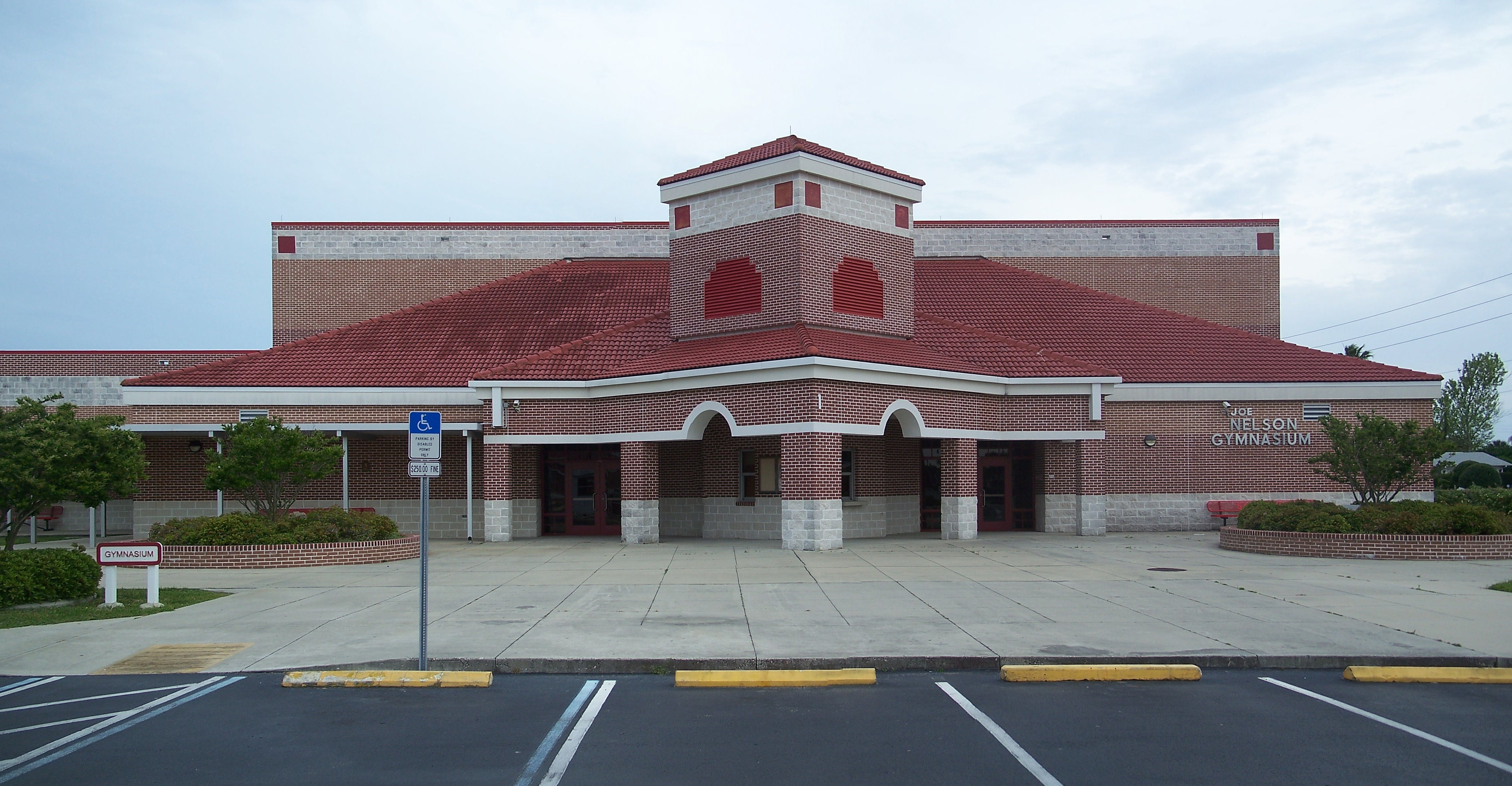

Location
- 2700 N. Oleander Ave. Daytona Beach, FL 32118; Daytona Beach, Florida 32118; United States

Information
- Type: Public High School
- Motto: "Helping dreams come true for over 100 years"
- Established: 1908
- School district: Volusia County Schools
- Principal: Tucker Harris
- Teaching staff: 76.53 (FTE)
- Grades: 9 to 12
- Enrollment: 1,695 (2023-2024)
- Student to teacher ratio: 22.15
- Colors: Red, white, and Columbia blue
- Slogan: "Once a sandcrab, always a sandcrab!"
- Sports: Varsity teams and Junior Varsity teams
- Mascot: Sandcrab
- Nickname: SHS, Breeze
- Team name: Sandcrabs
- Website: www.seabreezehigh.org

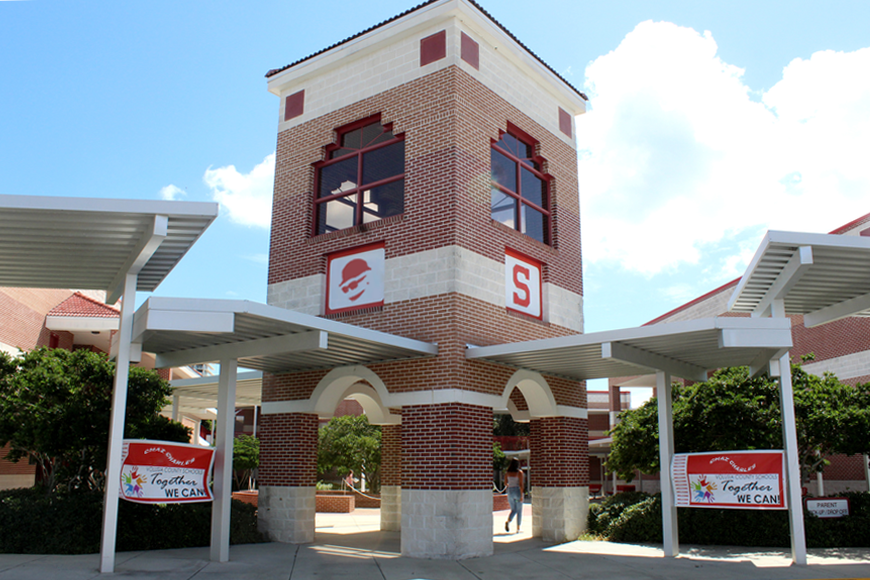
The Front Seabreeze Highschool

Seabreeze High School is a public high school in Daytona Beach, Florida, United States. The school was named a Blue Ribbon School of Excellence in 1989.

== Notable alumni ==
- Duane and Gregg Allman, of The Allman Brothers Band, class of 1965 (Gregg) (Duane was a school dropout)
- Ben Brainard, Stand up comedian
- Bill France Jr., president of NASCAR from 1972 to 2000, class of 1951
- Jim France, NASCAR and International Speedway Corporation executive, class of 1963
- Larry Gagner, artist and former college and professional football player, class of 1962
- Kerry Healey, lieutenant governor of Massachusetts from 2003 to 2007, class of 1978
- Shere Hite, sexologist, class of 1960
- J. R. House, professional baseball player
- Sebastian Janikowski, former Oakland Raiders kicker, NFL record holder for most 50+ yard field goals, class of 1997
- Brian Kelley, part of the country music duo, Florida Georgia Line
- Percell Gaskins, former NFL player for the St Louis Rams 95-96 and the Carolina Panthers 97-98, won the 1993 NCAA indoor national championship High Jump with a leap of 7’5”
- Walter McCoy, track athlete, 1984 Olympic gold medalist
- Dee Mewbourne, deputy commander, United States Transportation Command
- Allison Miner, class of 1967, co-founder New Orleans Jazz & Heritage Festival
- Jane Morgan, singer during the 1950s and 1960s
- Steve J. Palmer, actor and producer, known for portraying Bill Williamson in Red Dead Redemption and Red Dead Redemption 2
- Hal Prewitt, artist, photographer, entrepreneur, racecar driver and inventor of computer technology and early pioneer in the personal computer revolution, class of 1972
- Marie Ragghianti (real-life character played by Sissy Spacek in the film Marie), class of 1960
- Corey Walden, professional basketball player, 2019 Israeli Basketball Premier League MVP
- Eric Weems, wide receiver and Pro Bowl kickoff/punt returner for the Atlanta Falcons (NFL), class of 2003
