= 1964 Kentucky Wildcats football team =

American college football season

1964 Kentucky Wildcats football
- Conference: Southeastern Conference
- Record: 5–5 (4–2 SEC)
- Head coach: Charlie Bradshaw (3rd season)
- Home stadium: McLean Stadium

1964 Southeastern Conference football standings
	Conf.					Overall
Team	W		L		T	W		L		T
No. 1 Alabama $	8	–	0	–	0	10	–	1	–	0
Florida	4	–	2	–	0	7	–	3	–	0
Georgia	4	–	2	–	0	7	–	3	–	1
Kentucky	4	–	2	–	0	5	–	5	–	0
No. 7 LSU	4	–	2	–	1	8	–	2	–	1
Auburn	3	–	3	–	0	6	–	4	–	0
Ole Miss	2	–	4	–	1	5	–	5	–	1
Mississippi State	2	–	5	–	0	4	–	6	–	0
Vanderbilt	1	–	4	–	1	3	–	6	–	1
Tennessee	1	–	5	–	1	4	–	5	–	1
Tulane	1	–	5	–	0	3	–	7	–	0
$ – Conference champion; Georgia's game against Clemson and Tulane's game against Miami (FL) counted in the conference standings.; Rankings from AP Poll

The 1964 Kentucky Wildcats football team represented the University of Kentucky as a member of the Southeastern Conference during the 1964 NCAA University Division football season. Led by third-year head coach Charlie Bradshaw, the Wildcats compiled an overall record of 5–5 with a mark of 4–2 in conference play, placing in a three-way tie for second place in the SEC. Kentucky played home games at McLean Stadium in Lexington, Kentucky. Jim Foley and Bill Jenkins were chosen as team captains.

Kentucky opened the season with a 13–6 win against Detroit, and then upset top-ranked Ole Miss on the road, 27–21. A 20–0 victory against No. 7 Auburn followed. Kentucky was ranked No. 5 in the AP poll before a 48–6 loss at Florida State.

== Schedule ==
Date	Opponent	Rank	Site	Result	Attendance	Source
September 19	Detroit*		McLean Stadium; Lexington, KY	W 13–6	34,000	
September 26	at No. 1 Ole Miss		Mississippi Veterans Memorial Stadium; Jackson, MS	W 27–21	35,000	
October 3	No. 7 Auburn		McLean Stadium; Lexington, KY	W 20–0	37,500	
October 10	at Florida State*	No. 5	Doak Campbell Stadium; Tallahassee	L 6–48	34,248	
October 17	No. 9 LSU		McLean Stadium; Lexington, KY	L 7–27	38,000	
October 24	at Georgia		Sanford Stadium; Athens, GA	L 7–21	39,000	
October 31	at West Virginia*		Mountaineer Field; Morgantown, WV	L 21–26	20,000	
November 7	Vanderbilt		McLean Stadium; Lexington, KY (rivalry)	W 22–21	32,000	
November 14	Baylor*^{†}		McLean Stadium; Lexington, KY	L 15–17	28,000	
November 21	at Tennessee		Neyland Stadium; Knoxville, TN (rivalry)	W 12–7	42,000	
*Non-conference game; ^{†}Homecoming; Rankings from AP Poll released prior to the game

== Team players in the 1965 NFL draft ==
Player	Position	Round	Pick	NFL club
Jim Burt	Running back	10	134	Los Angeles Rams
