= Steve Bowman (American football) =

American football player (1944–2017)

No. 27
- Position: Halfback

Personal information
- Born: November 30, 1944; Pascagoula, Mississippi, U.S.
- Died: November 17, 2017 (aged 72); Centreville, Alabama, U.S.
- Listed height: 6 ft 0 in (1.83 m)
- Listed weight: 195 lb (88 kg)

Career information
- High school: Pascagoula
- College: Alabama (1962–1965)
- NFL draft: 1966: 15th round, 226th overall pick

Career history
- New York Giants (1966); → Scranton Miners (1966)

Awards and highlights
- 2× National champion (1964–1965); Second-team All-American (1965); 2× First-team All-SEC (1964–1965)
- Stats at Pro Football Reference

Steven Ellis Bowman (November 30, 1944 – November 17, 2017) was an American professional football halfback who played one season with the New York Giants of the National Football League (NFL). He was selected by the Giants in the 15th round of the 1966 NFL draft after playing college football at the University of Alabama.

== Early life ==
Steven Ellis Bowman was born on November 30, 1944, in Pascagoula, Mississippi. He played football and baseball at Pascagoula High School in Pascagoula. He earned All-Big 8 honors as a running back in football. Bowman was inducted into the Pascagoula Athletic Hall of Fame in 2016.

== College career ==
Bowman was a member of the Alabama Crimson Tide of the University of Alabama from 1962 to 1965 and a three-year letterman from 1963 to 1965. He rushed 39 times for 146 yards in 1963. In 1964, he totaled 106 carries for 536 yards and eight touchdowns, and three receptions for 27 yards, earning Associated Press (AP) first-team All-SEC and United Press International (UPI) third-team All-SEC honors. His eight rushing touchdowns and 5.1 yards per carry were both the highest in the SEC that season. The 1964 Crimson Tide were named national champions. Bowman rushed 153 times for 770 yards and six touchdowns his senior year in 1965 while also catching nine passes for 95 yards, garnering AP first-team All-SEC, UPI first-team All-SEC, and Central Press Association second-team All-American recognition. Bowman's 770 rushing yards were the most in the SEC that season. The 1965 Crimson Tide were named national champions for the second year in a row.

== Professional career ==
Bowman was selected by the Oakland Raiders in the 20th round, with the 179th overall pick, of the 1966 AFL draft and by the New York Giants in the 15th round, with the 226th overall pick, of the 1966 NFL draft. He decided to sign with the Giants. On August 31, 1966, the Giants allocated him to the Atlantic Coast Football League (ACFL) to play for the Scranton Miners, the Giants farm team. Bowman rushed 118 times for 581 yards and three touchdowns while also scoring one receiving touchdown for the Miners during the 1966 ACFL season. On November 25, 1966, Bowman was recalled to the Giants. He then played in four games for the Giants during the 1966 NFL season.

== Personal life ==
Bowman died on November 17, 2017, in Centreville, Alabama.
