= 1964 Vanderbilt Commodores football team =

American college football season

1964 Vanderbilt Commodores football
- Conference: Southeastern Conference
- Record: 3–6–1 (1–4–1 SEC)
- Head coach: John Green (2nd season)
- Home stadium: Dudley Field

1964 Southeastern Conference football standings
	Conf.					Overall
Team	W		L		T	W		L		T
No. 1 Alabama $	8	–	0	–	0	10	–	1	–	0
Florida	4	–	2	–	0	7	–	3	–	0
Georgia	4	–	2	–	0	7	–	3	–	1
Kentucky	4	–	2	–	0	5	–	5	–	0
No. 7 LSU	4	–	2	–	1	8	–	2	–	1
Auburn	3	–	3	–	0	6	–	4	–	0
Ole Miss	2	–	4	–	1	5	–	5	–	1
Mississippi State	2	–	5	–	0	4	–	6	–	0
Vanderbilt	1	–	4	–	1	3	–	6	–	1
Tennessee	1	–	5	–	1	4	–	5	–	1
Tulane	1	–	5	–	0	3	–	7	–	0
$ – Conference champion; Georgia's game against Clemson and Tulane's game against Miami (FL) counted in the conference standings.; Rankings from AP Poll

The 1964 Vanderbilt Commodores football team represented Vanderbilt University in the 1964 NCAA University Division football season. The Commodores were led by head coach John Green in his second season and finished the season with a record of three wins, six losses and one tie (3–6–1 overall, 1–4–1 in the SEC).

== Schedule ==
Date	Opponent	Site	Result	Attendance	Source
September 19	at Georgia Tech*	Grant Field; Atlanta, GA (rivalry)	L 2–14	44,288	
September 26	Georgia	Dudley Field; Nashville, TN (rivalry)	L 0–7	19,098	
October 3	at No. 4 Alabama	Legion Field; Birmingham, AL	L 0–24	47,325	
October 10	Wake Forest*	Dudley Field; Nashville, TN	W 9–6	12,600	
October 17	at George Washington*	District of Columbia Stadium; Washington, DC	W 14–0	5,200	
October 24	Ole Miss	Dudley Field; Nashville, TN (rivalry)	T 7–7	16,500	
November 7	at Kentucky	McLean Stadium; Lexington, KY (rivalry)	L 21–22	32,000	
November 14	Tulane	Dudley Field; Nashville, TN	L 2–7		
November 20	at Miami (FL)*	Miami Orange Bowl; Miami, FL	L 17–35	31,649	
November 28	Tennessee	Dudley Field; Nashville, TN (rivalry)	W 7–0	30,000	
*Non-conference game; Rankings from AP Poll released prior to the game
