= 1965 Cotton Bowl Classic =

- 29th Cotton Bowl Classic
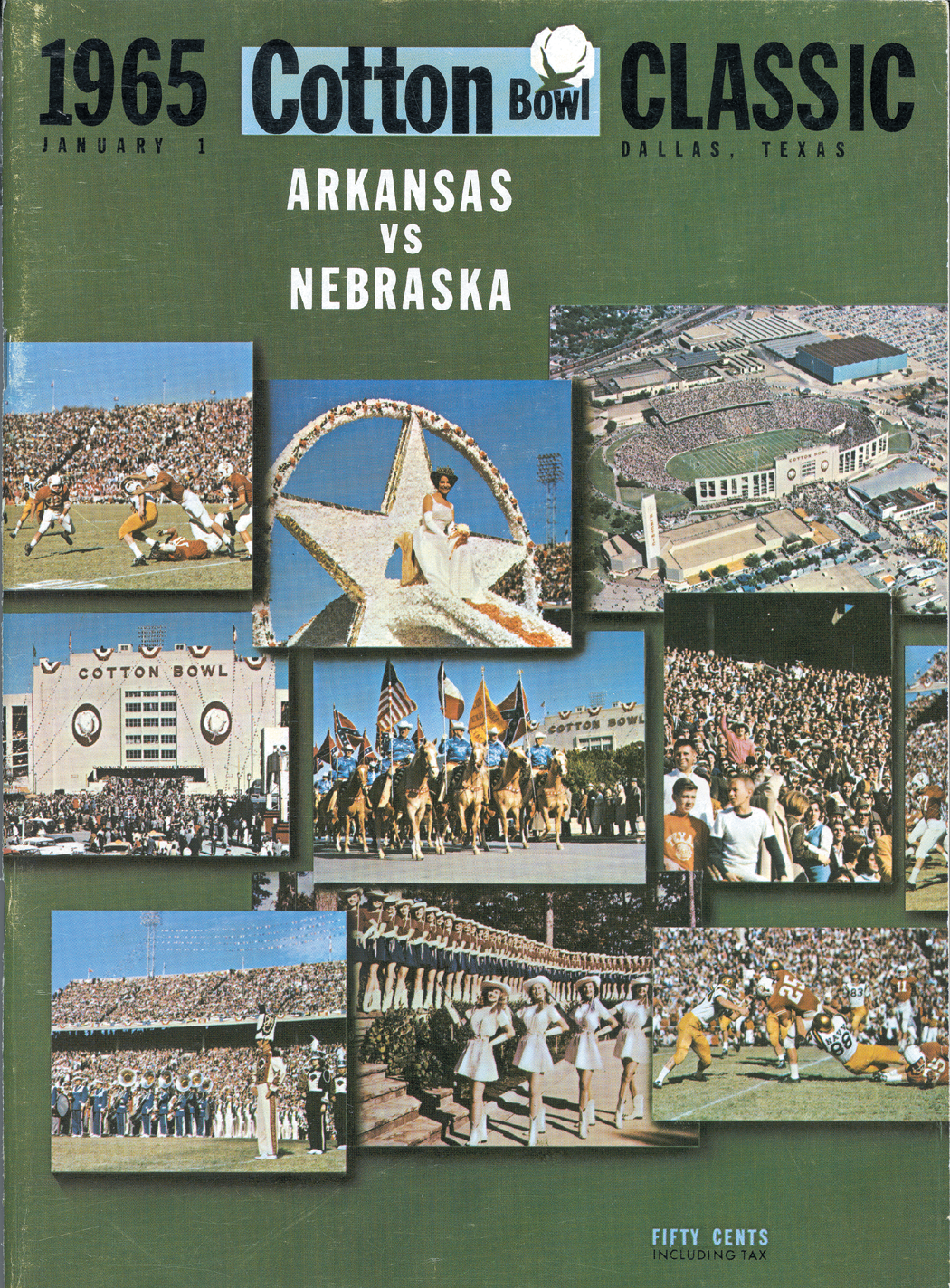
Nebraska Cornhuskers	Arkansas Razorbacks
(9–1)	(10–0)
Big Eight	SWC
7	10
Head coach: Bob Devaney	Head coach: Frank Broyles
AP / Coaches; 6 / 6	AP / Coaches; 2 / 2
	1	2	3	4	Total
Nebraska	0	7	0	0	7
Arkansas	3	0	0	7	10
- Date: January 1, 1965
- Season: 1964
- Stadium: Cotton Bowl
- Location: Dallas, Texas
- MVP: Ronnie Caveness (Arkansas LB); Fred Marshall (Arkansas QB)
- Favorite: Arkansas
- Attendance: 75,504

United States TV coverage
- Network: CBS

The 1965 Cotton Bowl Classic was the twenty-ninth edition of the college football bowl game, played on January 1, 1965 at the Cotton Bowl in Dallas, Texas. The game matched Southwest champion Arkansas against Big Eight champion Nebraska.

In a tightly contested defensive battle, second-ranked Arkansas rallied to defeat No. 6 Nebraska 10–7 to win its first Cotton Bowl, and was later named national champion by multiple selectors.

== Teams ==
=== Nebraska ===
Under third-year head coach Bob Devaney, Nebraska won its first nine games and ascended to fourth in the AP poll, the highest ranking in school history. NU won the Big Eight outright for the second consecutive year, but a 17–7 loss at rival Oklahoma on November 21 snapped a sixteen-game win streak and eliminated the Cornhuskers from national championship contention.

=== Arkansas ===
No. 2 Arkansas entered the Cotton Bowl 10–0, including a victory over top-ranked Texas in Austin, to earn the Southwest Conference title. All-American two-way lineman Ronnie Caveness led the Razorbacks' top-ranked scoring defense that allowed just 5.7 points per game. Head coach Frank Broyles made liberal use of the NCAA's new unlimited-substitution rule, which was adopted at the beginning of the 1964 season but was still a rarity among elite teams.

Arkansas had lost three consecutive major bowl games, but entered its 1965 meeting with Nebraska as a slight favorite.

== Game ==
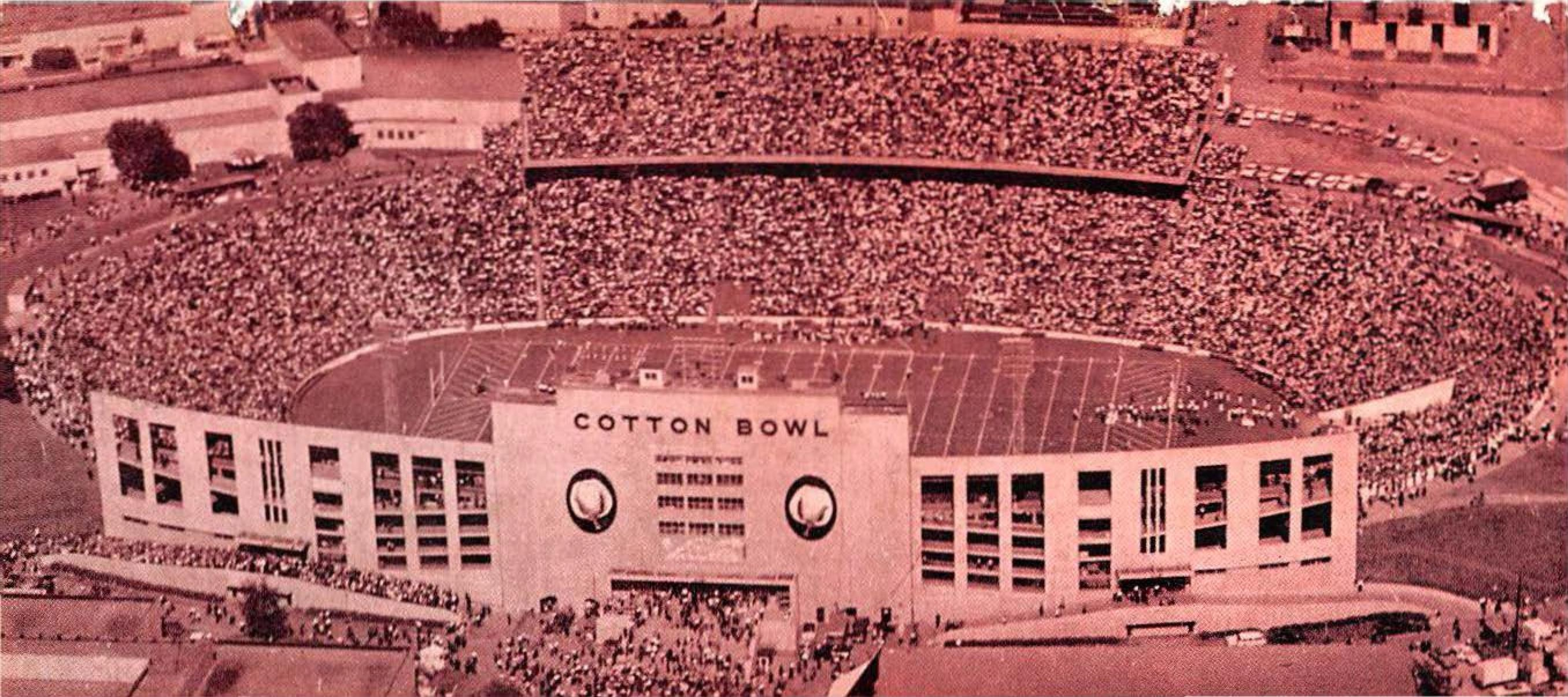
The stadium, as shown in the game's media guide

A standing-room only crowd watched as Arkansas opened the scoring on a Tom McKnelly field goal minutes into the game. Nebraska responded midway through the second quarter, using a pair of Fred Marshall fumbles and a long pass to Harry Wilson to score the first points against Arkansas in six games. The Cornhuskers took a 7–3 lead into halftime, Arkansas's first deficit since October 3.

Nebraska's aggressive defensive gameplan frustrated Arkansas for much of the afternoon, and the Razorbacks made a switch at quarterback after a scoreless third quarter. NU advanced into Arkansas territory early in the fourth quarter, but was turned back without extending the lead. With time winding down, Marshall completed five passes while engineering an eighty-yard Arkansas drive, capped by a three-yard touchdown by running back Bobby Burnett with 4:41 remaining.

Nebraska was unable to mount a threat and Arkansas held on to win 10–7, the program's first victory in a major bowl and its twelfth consecutive win. Marshall and Cavenass, who finished with fifteen tackles, were named the game's most valuable players.

=== Scoring summary ===
Qtr	Team	Time	Detail	NU	ARK
1	ARK	9:47	Tom McKnelly 31-yd field goal	0	3
2	NU	7:45	Harry Wilson 1-yd run (Duncan Drum kick)	7	3
4	ARK	4:41	Bobby Burnett 3-yd run (McKnelly kick)	7	10

=== Team statistics ===
Statistic	Nebraska	Arkansas
First downs	11	11
Rushes–yards	44–100	34–45
Comp.–att.–yards	6–16–68	11–19–131
Total offense	168	176
Turnovers	2	3
Punts–average	6–33.3	6–40.1
Penalty yards	25	50

== Aftermath ==
Broyles rushed his team through postgame festivities so they could watch the Orange Bowl between top-ranked Alabama and Texas. The Longhorns' 21–17 upset left Arkansas as the only unbeaten major-conference team in the country, though the Crimson Tide was still named national champion by the AP and UPI, which released their final polls prior to bowl season. Arkansas was named champion by the FWAA and the Helms Athletic Foundation, the school's only national title claim. Partially due to the results of the Cotton and Orange Bowls in 1964, the AP waited until after bowl season to select a champion in 1965.

Arkansas co-captain Jerry Jones later purchased the Dallas Cowboys and facilitated the construction of Cowboys Stadium in suburban Arlington, where the Cotton Bowl Classic has been played since 2010.

The 1965 Cotton Bowl Classic is the only time Arkansas and Nebraska have met.
