= Allen Trammell =

American football player (1942–2024)

No. 47
- Position: Defensive back

Personal information
- Born: July 19, 1942; Montgomery, Alabama, U.S.
- Died: February 17, 2024 (aged 81)
- Listed height: 6 ft 0 in (1.83 m)
- Listed weight: 190 lb (86 kg)

Career information
- High school: Baylor (Chattanooga, Tennessee)
- College: Florida (1962–1965)
- NFL draft: 1966: undrafted

Career history
- Houston Oilers (1966)

Awards and highlights
- Second-team All-SEC (1964)
- Stats at Pro Football Reference

Allen Raymond Trammell Jr. (July 19, 1942 – February 17, 2024) was an American professional football player who was a defensive back for one season with the Houston Oilers of the American Football League (AFL). He played college football and baseball at the University of Florida.

== Early life ==
Allen Raymond Trammell Jr. was born on July 19, 1942, in Montgomery, Alabama. For high school, he first enrolled at Eufaula High School in Eufaula, Alabama before transferring to Baylor School in Chattanooga, Tennessee.

== College career ==
Trammell was a member of the Florida Gators of the University of Florida from 1962 to 1965 and a three-year letterman from 1963 to 1965. He spent time at running back, quarterback, and defensive back in college. In 1963, he recorded 16 rushing attempts for 84 yards, eight receptions for 107 yards, and two completions on three passing attempts for 22 yards. Trammell totaled eight rushing attempts for one yard in 1964 while also completing one of five passes for 20 yards and one touchdown, earning Associated Press second-team All-SEC honors at defensive back. As a senior in 1965, he rushed twice for 17 yards and completed two of two passes for four yards. He also played baseball at Florida. As of 2023, his .425 batting average in 1965 is still a school record while his eight RBIs in one inning is tied for the NCAA record. Trammell was inducted into the University of Florida Athletic Hall of Fame in 1975.

== Professional career ==
Trammell went undrafted in 1966 and afterwards signed with the Houston Oilers of the American Football League. He played in three games, starting one, for the Oilers during the 1966 season, returning three kicks for 63 yards and five punts for 19 yards. He was released in 1967.

== Post-playing career ==
Trammell was the defensive backs coach and head recruiter for the Florida Gators football team from 1971 to 1977. Trammell them worked for ten years in the sporting goods industry. He was later in the commercial insurance industry from 1987 until his death in 2024.

Trammell died on February 17, 2024, after a long bout with Parkinson's disease. He was noted as one of Steve Spurrier's best friends.
