= Tommy Tolleson =

American football player (born 1943)

No. 86
- Position: Wide receiver

Personal information
- Born: January 30, 1943; Birmingham, Alabama, U.S.
- Died: May 11, 2015 (aged 72); St. Simons Island, Georgia, U.S.
- Listed height: 6 ft 1 in (1.85 m)
- Listed weight: 195 lb (88 kg)

Career information
- High school: Talladega (Talladega, Alabama)
- College: Alabama (1962–1965)
- NFL draft: 1966: 15th round, 216th overall pick
- AFL draft: 1966: 17th round, 150th overall pick

Career history
- Atlanta Falcons (1966)

Awards and highlights
- 2× National champion (1964, 1965); First-team All-SEC (1965); Second-team All-SEC (1964)
- Stats at Pro Football Reference

Thomas Anthony Tolleson (January 30, 1943 – May 11, 2015) was an American professional football wide receiver who played one season with the Atlanta Falcons of the National Football League (NFL). He was selected by the Falcons in the 15th round of the 1966 NFL draft after playing college football at the University of Alabama.

== Early life and college ==
Thomas Anthony Tolleson was born on January 30, 1943, in Birmingham, Alabama. He attended Talladega High School in Talladega, Alabama.

Tolleson was a member of the Alabama Crimson Tide of the University of Alabama from 1962 to 1965 and a three-year letterman from 1963 to 1965. He caught nine passes for 110 yards in 1963, 22 passes for 248 yards and two touchdowns in 1964, and 32 passes for 374 yards and two touchdowns in 1965. In 1964, he earned Associated Press (AP) second-team All-SEC honors and United Press International (UPI) third-team All-SEC honors. Tolleson was named first-team All-SEC by the AP as a senior in 1965. The Crimson Tide were national champions in both 1964 and 1965.

== Professional career ==
Tolleson was selected by the Atlanta Falcons in the 15th round, with the 216th overall pick, of the 1966 NFL draft and by the New York Jets in the 17th round, with the 150th overall pick, of the 1966 AFL draft. He chose to sign with the Falcons. He played in eight games during the 1966 season and recovered one fumble. Tolleson was released on August 28, 1967.

== Personal life ==
In 1968, Tolleson returned to the University of Alabama as a receivers coach. In 1972, he started a career as a general contractor in Atlanta, Georgia. He later moved to St. Simons Island, Georgia and started T.A. Tolleson Construction Company. Tolleson died on May 11, 2015, in St. Simons Island after a long battle with Huntington's disease.
