= 1964 NCAA University Division football season =

American college football season

- Preseason AP No. 1: Ole Miss
- Regular season: September 19 – November 28, 1964
- Number of bowls: 8
- Bowl games: December 19, 1964 – January 2, 1965
- Champion(s): Alabama (AP, Coaches); Arkansas (FWAA); Notre Dame (NFF) (not claimed)
- Heisman: Notre Dame quarterback John Huarte

The NCAA was without a playoff for the major college football teams in the University Division, later known as Division I-A, during the 20th century. The NCAA recognizes Division I-A national champions based on the final results of polls including the "wire service" (AP and UPI), FWAA and NFF. The 1964 AP poll continued to rank only ten teams, compiling the votes of 55 sportswriters, each of whom would give their opinion of the ten best. Under a point system of 10 points for first place, 9 for second, etc., the "overall" ranking was determined.

The 1964 season ended with controversy as to whether Alabama or Arkansas should be recognized as the national champion:

- Alabama finished the regular season at 10–0 and ranked No. 1 in the final AP Poll and UPI Coaches Poll. The AP and UPI did not conduct post-bowl game polling at the time, so, despite its loss in the 1965 Orange Bowl to No. 5 Texas, Alabama remained the AP and UPI national champion.
- Arkansas, ranked No. 2 in the AP and UPI polls, defeated No. 6 Nebraska in the Cotton Bowl, had also defeated common opponent Texas in Austin, and finished as the only undefeated and untied major college team. In polling conducted after the bowl games, a five-man committee of the Football Writers Association of America (FWAA) selected Arkansas as the winner of the Grantland Rice Trophy as the top college football team in the country. Arkansas received four of five first-place votes, with Texas receiving the fifth vote. Alabama did not receive a single vote for first, second, or third place. Arkansas is also recognized as the 1964 national champion by Billingsley Report, College Football Researchers Association, Helms Athletic Foundation, National Championship Foundation, Poling System, Sagarin, and Sagarin (ELO-Chess).

After a one-year trial run in 1965, the AP Poll began its current practice of naming their national champion at the conclusion of the bowl games in 1968. The UPI Poll followed suit in 1974, after its choice for national champions in each of 1965, 1970, and 1973 lost their respective bowl games.

== Conference and program changes ==
- The Missouri Valley Intercollegiate Athletic Association changed its official name to the Big Eight Conference prior the 1964 season; this name remained until the league's dissolution and formation of the Big 12 Conference in 1996.

School	1963 Conference	1964 Conference
Georgia Tech Yellow Jackets	Southeastern	Independent
Oregon Ducks	Independent	AAWU
Oregon State Beavers	Independent	AAWU

== September ==
In the preseason poll released on September 14, Mississippi (Ole Miss) was ranked first and Oklahoma second. Big Ten rivals Illinois and Ohio State were ranked No. 3 and No. 5 respectively, while 1963 champion Texas was No. 4. On September 19, No. 1 Mississippi beat Memphis State 30–0 at home, while No. 2 Oklahoma beat Maryland 13–3 on the road at College Park. No. 4 Texas defeated Tulane 31–0 at home.

The following week (September 26), No. 1 Mississippi was upset 27–21 by a late Kentucky touchdown at Jackson. Ole Miss would finish just 5–5–1 after posting a 46–4–3 mark over the previous five years. In its first season after the retirement of longtime head coach Bud Wilkinson, No. 2 Oklahoma was crushed by the USC Trojans, 40–14, before a record home crowd. Neither Mississippi nor Oklahoma would return to the AP Poll at any point for the rest of the year. No. 3 Illinois beat California 20–14, and No. 4 Texas shut out Texas Tech 23–0. No. 5 Ohio State defeated SMU at home, 27–8. No. 6 Alabama beat Tulane 36–6. In the poll that followed, the Texas Longhorns were the new No. 1 and USC No. 2, followed by No. 3 Illinois, No. 4 Alabama, and No. 5 Ohio State.

== October ==
On October 3, No. 1 Texas beat Army 17–6 at home. Meanwhile, No. 2 USC lost 17–7 at Michigan State and No. 3 Illinois won 17–6 over Northwestern. No. 4 Alabama beat Tulane in a neutral site game at Mobile, 36–6. No. 5 Ohio State beat Indiana at home, 17–9. Previously unranked Kentucky earned a spot in the next poll after beating No. 7 Auburn 20–0 in Birmingham for its second straight upset of a top-ten team. Two games, Duke at Tulane and Florida at LSU, were postponed until the end of the season due to the threat of Hurricane Hilda, which made landfall in Louisiana that day. The next top five: No. 1 Texas, No. 2 Illinois, No. 3 Alabama, No. 4 Ohio State, and No. 5 Kentucky.

Top-ranked Texas beat Oklahoma 28–7 at Dallas on October 10. Visiting No. 4 Ohio State shut out No. 2 Illinois 26–0, and No. 3 Alabama beat North Carolina State 21–0. No. 5 Kentucky, previously 3–0, was beaten 48–6 by Florida State, the start of a four-game losing streak en route to a 5–5 season. Two road wins moved teams into the top five. No. 6 Notre Dame, enjoying a resurgence under new coach Ara Parseghian, won 34–7 at Air Force and No. 8 Michigan won 17–10 at No. 9 Michigan State. The top 5 were No. 1 Texas, No. 2 Ohio State, No. 3 Alabama, No. 4 Notre Dame, and No. 5 Michigan.

On October 17, No. 8 Arkansas beat No. 1 Texas at Austin, 14–13, stopping a late two-point conversion attempt. No. 2 Ohio State beat the USC Trojans in Columbus, 17–0. No. 3 Alabama and No. 4 Notre Dame remained unbeaten, defeating Tennessee (19–8) and UCLA (24–0) respectively. No. 5 Michigan lost to Purdue 21–20. No. 6 Nebraska, which had beaten Kansas State 47–0 (and outscored its opponents 171–34 in five wins), moved into the top five. The rankings were No. 1 Ohio State, No. 2 Notre Dame, No. 3 Alabama, No. 4 Arkansas, and No. 5 Nebraska.

October 24 had No. 1 Ohio State over Wisconsin at home, 28–3. No. 2 Notre Dame beat Stanford 26–7, No. 3 Alabama beat No. 9 Florida 17–14. No. 4 Arkansas beat Wichita State 17–0, and No. 5 Nebraska beat Colorado 21–3. The top five remained unchanged.

October 31, No. 1 Ohio State edged Iowa 21–19 while No. 2 Notre Dame defeated Navy 40–0, causing the two teams to switch spots in the next poll. No. 3 Alabama (23–6 over Ole Miss), No. 4 Arkansas (17–0 over Texas A&M) and No. 5 Nebraska (9–0 over Missouri) remained unbeaten and received the same rankings.

== November ==
November 7, No. 1 Notre Dame beat the Pitt Panthers at Pittsburgh 17–15. Meanwhile, No. 2 Ohio State suffered its first loss to unranked (3–4) Penn State, 27–0. No. 3 Alabama (17–9 over No. 8 LSU), No. 4 Arkansas (21–0 vs. Rice) and No. 5 Nebraska (14–7 over Kansas) stayed unbeaten. No. 6 Texas (7–1), whose lone loss had been to Arkansas, won 20–14 at Baylor. The next poll was No. 1 Notre Dame, No. 2 Alabama, No. 3 Arkansas, No. 4 Nebraska, and No. 5 Texas.

November 14, No. 1 Notre Dame defeated Michigan State 34–7, and No. 2 Alabama beat No. 10 Georgia Tech in Atlanta, 14–7, to stay unbeaten. Also unblemished were No. 3 Arkansas (44–0 over SMU) and No. 4 Nebraska (27–14 vs. Oklahoma State). With two weeks still to go in the regular season, all three of the preceding teams had clinched their conference championships (the SEC, SWC, and Big 8 respectively). No. 5 Texas won 28–13 over TCU. The poll remained unchanged.

November 21, No. 1 Notre Dame beat Iowa in South Bend, 28–0. No. 2 Alabama was idle. No. 3 Arkansas beat Texas Tech 17–0 to close its regular season with five straight shutouts and a 10–0 record. No. 4 Nebraska suffered its first loss at Oklahoma, 17–7. No. 5 Texas was idle. In a foreshadowing of future battles, No. 6 Michigan faced off against No. 7 Ohio State with the Big Ten title and a berth in the Rose Bowl on the line. The Wolverines blanked the Buckeyes 10–0 and earned the conference championship. In the November 23 AP poll, unbeaten Notre Dame, Alabama, and Arkansas were first, second, and third, followed by No. 4 Michigan and No. 5 Texas.

November 26–28: Thanksgiving Day saw No. 2 Alabama finish the regular season unbeaten (10–0) with a 21–14 win over Auburn in Birmingham. No. 5 Texas beat Texas A&M 26–7 to finish 10–1. On November 28 in Los Angeles, No. 1 Notre Dame led USC 17–0 at halftime but lost, 20–17, as a virtual clinching ND touchdown was negated by a dubious holding penalty call at the goal line in the 4th quarter. The Trojans shared the AAWU conference title with No. 8 Oregon State, and a controversial tiebreaker sent the Beavers to face Michigan in the Rose Bowl. With only Alabama and Arkansas remaining unbeaten, both with records of 10–0, the final AP poll was taken on November 30. Alabama took over the top spot and recognition as the NCAA national champion. Arkansas was No. 2, Notre Dame dropped to No. 3, and Michigan and Texas stayed at No. 4 and No. 5.

Unusually, the SEC and Big 8 champions did not play in the Sugar and Orange Bowls this year. Alabama won the SEC championship, but a "no repeat rule" prevented them from playing in the Sugar Bowl for a second straight year; instead, runner-up LSU (ranked No. 7 by the AP) was matched against Syracuse. The Orange Bowl invited Alabama and Texas on November 21. The Cotton Bowl had already set up a meeting between Big 8 winner Nebraska and Southwestern Conference champ Arkansas, in what the organizers hoped would be a meeting of undefeated teams; the arrangements were finalized before Nebraska lost to Oklahoma in their last game of the regular season. Notre Dame, which was undefeated and the presumptive champion at the time the bowls were being set up, also lost its last game. (Notre Dame had a longstanding policy against playing in bowl games, which was not rescinded until the 1969 season.) Thus, the season ended with only two undefeated teams, but the early bowl commitments prevented the possibility of a No. 1 vs. No. 2 showdown.

== Conference standings ==
1964 Athletic Association of Western Universities football standings
	Conf.					Overall
Team	W		L		T	W		L		T
No. 8 Oregon State ^ +	3	–	1	–	0	8	–	3	–	0
No. 10 USC +	3	–	1	–	0	7	–	3	–	0
Washington	5	–	2	–	0	6	–	4	–	0
UCLA	2	–	2	–	0	4	–	6	–	0
Stanford	3	–	4	–	0	5	–	5	–	0
Oregon	1	–	2	–	1	7	–	2	–	1
Washington State	1	–	2	–	1	3	–	6	–	1
California	0	–	4	–	0	3	–	7	–	0
+ – Conference co-champions; ^ – Rose Bowl representative determined by longest absence, due to no head-to-head result and 4–4 tie in member vote.; Rankings from AP Poll

1964 Atlantic Coast Conference football standings
	Conf.					Overall
Team	W		L		T	W		L		T
NC State $	5	–	2	–	0	5	–	5	–	0
Duke	3	–	2	–	1	4	–	5	–	1
Maryland	4	–	3	–	0	5	–	5	–	0
North Carolina	4	–	3	–	0	5	–	5	–	0
Wake Forest	4	–	3	–	0	5	–	5	–	0
South Carolina	2	–	3	–	1	3	–	5	–	2
Clemson	2	–	4	–	0	3	–	7	–	0
Virginia	1	–	5	–	0	5	–	5	–	0
$ – Conference champion; Rankings from AP Poll

1964 Big Eight Conference football standings
	Conf.					Overall
Team	W		L		T	W		L		T
No. 6 Nebraska $	6	–	1	–	0	9	–	2	–	0
Oklahoma	5	–	1	–	1	6	–	4	–	1
Kansas	5	–	2	–	0	6	–	4	–	0
Missouri	4	–	2	–	1	6	–	3	–	1
Oklahoma State	3	–	4	–	0	4	–	6	–	0
Kansas State	3	–	4	–	0	3	–	7	–	0
Colorado	1	–	6	–	0	2	–	8	–	0
Iowa State	0	–	7	–	0	1	–	8	–	1
$ – Conference champion; Rankings from AP Poll

1964 Big Sky Conference football standings
	Conf.					Overall
Team	W		L		T	W		L		T
Montana State $	3	–	0	–	0	7	–	4	–	0
Idaho State	2	–	1	–	0	6	–	3	–	0
Montana	1	–	2	–	0	3	–	6	–	0
Weber State	0	–	3	–	0	2	–	6	–	0
Idaho *	0	–	0	–	0	4	–	6	–	0
$ – Conference champion; * – Insufficient number of games for conference championship

1964 Big Ten Conference football standings
	Conf.					Overall
Team	W		L		T	W		L		T
No. 4 Michigan $	6	–	1	–	0	9	–	1	–	0
No. 9 Ohio State	5	–	1	–	0	7	–	2	–	0
Purdue	5	–	2	–	0	6	–	3	–	0
Illinois	4	–	3	–	0	6	–	3	–	0
Minnesota	4	–	3	–	0	5	–	4	–	0
Michigan State	3	–	3	–	0	4	–	5	–	0
Northwestern	2	–	5	–	0	3	–	6	–	0
Wisconsin	2	–	5	–	0	3	–	6	–	0
Iowa	1	–	5	–	0	3	–	6	–	0
Indiana	1	–	5	–	0	2	–	7	–	0
$ – Conference champion; Rankings from AP Poll

1964 Ivy League football standings
	Conf.					Overall
Team	W		L		T	W		L		T
Princeton $	7	–	0	–	0	9	–	0	–	0
Harvard	5	–	2	–	0	6	–	3	–	0
Yale	4	–	2	–	1	6	–	2	–	1
Dartmouth	4	–	3	–	0	6	–	3	–	0
Cornell	3	–	4	–	0	3	–	5	–	1
Brown	3	–	4	–	0	5	–	4	–	0
Columbia	1	–	5	–	1	2	–	6	–	1
Penn	0	–	7	–	0	1	–	8	–	0
$ – Conference champion

1964 Mid-American Conference football standings
	Conf.					Overall
Team	W		L		T	W		L		T
Bowling Green $	5	–	1	–	0	9	–	1	–	0
Marshall	4	–	2	–	0	7	–	3	–	0
Miami (OH)	4	–	2	–	0	6	–	3	–	1
Ohio	3	–	2	–	1	5	–	4	–	1
Western Michigan	2	–	4	–	0	3	–	6	–	0
Kent State	1	–	4	–	1	3	–	5	–	1
Toledo	1	–	5	–	0	2	–	8	–	0
$ – Conference champion

1964 Middle Three Conference football standings
	Conf.					Overall
Team	W		L		T	W		L		T
Rutgers $	2	–	0	–	0	6	–	3	–	0
Lehigh	0	–	1	–	1	1	–	7	–	1
Lafayette	0	–	1	–	1	0	–	7	–	2
$ – Conference champion

1964 Missouri Valley Conference football standings
	Conf.					Overall
Team	W		L		T	W		L		T
Cincinnati $	4	–	0	–	0	8	–	2	–	0
No. 18 Tulsa	3	–	1	–	0	9	–	2	–	0
Wichita State	2	–	2	–	0	4	–	6	–	0
North Texas State	1	–	3	–	0	2	–	7	–	1
Louisville	0	–	4	–	0	1	–	9	–	0
$ – Conference champion; The games against North Texas State counted twice in the conference standings for Cincinnati and Louisville.; Rankings from Coaches Poll

1964 Southeastern Conference football standings
	Conf.					Overall
Team	W		L		T	W		L		T
No. 1 Alabama $	8	–	0	–	0	10	–	1	–	0
Florida	4	–	2	–	0	7	–	3	–	0
Georgia	4	–	2	–	0	7	–	3	–	1
Kentucky	4	–	2	–	0	5	–	5	–	0
No. 7 LSU	4	–	2	–	1	8	–	2	–	1
Auburn	3	–	3	–	0	6	–	4	–	0
Ole Miss	2	–	4	–	1	5	–	5	–	1
Mississippi State	2	–	5	–	0	4	–	6	–	0
Vanderbilt	1	–	4	–	1	3	–	6	–	1
Tennessee	1	–	5	–	1	4	–	5	–	1
Tulane	1	–	5	–	0	3	–	7	–	0
$ – Conference champion; Georgia's game against Clemson and Tulane's game against Miami (FL) counted in the conference standings.; Rankings from AP Poll

1964 Southern Conference football standings
	Conf.					Overall
Team	W		L		T	W		L		T
West Virginia $	5	–	0	–	0	7	–	4	–	0
Virginia Tech	3	–	1	–	0	6	–	4	–	0
George Washington	3	–	2	–	0	5	–	4	–	0
The Citadel	4	–	3	–	0	4	–	6	–	0
William & Mary	4	–	3	–	0	4	–	6	–	0
Richmond	2	–	4	–	0	3	–	7	–	0
Davidson	1	–	3	–	0	3	–	6	–	0
Furman	1	–	4	–	0	3	–	7	–	0
VMI	1	–	4	–	0	1	–	9	–	0
$ – Conference champion

1964 Southwest Conference football standings
	Conf.					Overall
Team	W		L		T	W		L		T
No. 2 Arkansas $	7	–	0	–	0	11	–	0	–	0
No. 5 Texas	6	–	1	–	0	10	–	1	–	0
Baylor	4	–	3	–	0	5	–	5	–	0
Texas Tech	3	–	3	–	1	6	–	4	–	1
Rice	3	–	3	–	1	4	–	5	–	1
TCU	3	–	4	–	0	4	–	6	–	0
Texas A&M	1	–	6	–	0	1	–	9	–	0
SMU	0	–	7	–	0	1	–	9	–	0
$ – Conference champion; Rankings from AP Poll

1964 Western Athletic Conference football standings
	Conf.					Overall
Team	W		L		T	W		L		T
New Mexico +	3	–	1	–	0	9	–	2	–	0
Utah +	3	–	1	–	0	9	–	2	–	0
Arizona +	3	–	1	–	0	6	–	3	–	1
Wyoming	2	–	2	–	0	6	–	2	–	2
Arizona State	0	–	2	–	0	8	–	2	–	0
BYU	0	–	4	–	0	3	–	6	–	1
+ – Conference co-champions

1964 NCAA University Division independents football records
	Conf.			Overall
Team	W	L	T	W		L		T
No. 3 Notre Dame		–		9	–	1	–	0
Florida State		–		9	–	1	–	1
Colgate		–		7	–	2	–	0
Georgia Tech		–		7	–	3	–	0
Syracuse		–		7	–	4	–	0
Villanova		–		6	–	2	–	0
Boston College		–		6	–	3	–	0
Southern Miss		–		6	–	3	–	0
New Mexico State		–		6	–	4	–	0
Penn State		–		6	–	4	–	0
Memphis State		–		5	–	4	–	0
Utah State		–		5	–	4	–	1
Holy Cross		–		5	–	5	–	0
Buffalo		–		4	–	4	–	1
Colorado State		–		5	–	6	–	0
Air Force		–		4	–	5	–	1
Miami (FL)		–		4	–	5	–	1
Xavier		–		4	–	5	–	1
Army		–		4	–	6	–	0
West Texas State		–		4	–	6	–	0
San Jose State		–		4	–	6	–	0
Pittsburgh		–		3	–	5	–	2
Navy		–		3	–	6	–	1
Dayton		–		3	–	7	–	0
Detroit		–		3	–	7	–	0
Boston University		–		2	–	7	–	0
Houston		–		2	–	6	–	1
Texas Western		–		0	–	8	–	2
Rankings from AP Poll

== Bowl games ==
=== Major bowls ===
Friday, January 1, 1965

Bowl				
COTTON	No. 2 Arkansas Razorbacks	10	No. 6 Nebraska Cornhuskers	7
SUGAR	No. 7 LSU Tigers	10	No. 12 Syracuse Orangemen	7
ROSE	No. 4 Michigan Wolverines	34	No. 8 Oregon State Beavers	7
ORANGE	No. 5 Texas Longhorns	21	No. 1 Alabama Crimson Tide	17

Top-ranked Alabama, led by quarterback Joe Namath, fell to No. 5 Texas 21–17 in the Orange Bowl, the first night postseason bowl game. In the final minutes, down by four and facing 4th-and-goal at the Texas one-yard line, Namath's quarterback sneak was denied by the Longhorn defense. In the Cotton Bowl, quarterback Fred Marshall drove No. 2 Arkansas to a touchdown with 4:41 left to beat No. 6 Nebraska 10–7. Notable members of the 1964 Arkansas team include Jerry Jones, who would later become a billionaire as owner of the Dallas Cowboys of the NFL, and Jimmy Johnson, whom Jones would hire as coach of the Cowboys. No. 5 Michigan routed No. 8 Oregon State 34–7 in the Rose Bowl, while in the Sugar Bowl, No. 7 LSU beat unranked Syracuse 10–7 on a late field goal.

A five-member committee of the Football Writers Association of America awarded Arkansas the Grantland Rice Award as the No. 1 team in a poll taken after the bowl games. The Helms Athletic Foundation, which also took polls after the bowl games, named Arkansas as the national champions. Notre Dame was named as the National Football Foundation's national champion. In 1965, the AP's final poll came after the bowl games, but the policy did not become permanent until 1968. The Coaches' Poll adopted the same policy in 1974, after similar issues in 1970 and 1973. These selectors, including the AP Poll and the Coaches' Poll, were nationally syndicated in newspapers and magazines during the 1964 football season.

=== Other bowls ===
BOWL	Location	Date	Winner	Score	Runner-up
SUN	El Paso, Texas	December 26	Georgia	7–0	Texas Tech
GATOR	Jacksonville, Florida	January 2	No. 11 Florida State	36–19	Oklahoma
BLUEBONNET	Houston	December 19	No. 18 Tulsa	14–7	No. 20 Mississippi
LIBERTY	Atlantic City, New Jersey	December 19	No. 14 Utah	32–6	West Virginia

- Prior to the 1975 season, the Big Ten and Pac-8 (AAWU) conferences allowed only one postseason participant each, for the Rose Bowl.
- Notre Dame did not play in the postseason for 44 consecutive seasons (1925–1968).

== Heisman Trophy voting ==
The Heisman Trophy is given to the year's most outstanding player

Player	School	Position	1st	Total
John Huarte	Notre Dame	QB	216	1,026
Jerry Rhome	Tulsa	QB	186	952
Dick Butkus	Illinois	C	77	505
Bob Timberlake	Michigan	QB	80	361
Jack Snow	Notre Dame	E	—N/a	187
Tucker Frederickson	Auburn	HB	—N/a	184
Craig Morton	California	QB	—N/a	181
Steve DeLong	Tennessee	MG	—N/a	176
Cosmo Iacavazzi	Princeton	FB	—N/a	165
Brian Piccolo	Wake Forest	HB	—N/a	124

== See also ==
- 1964 NCAA University Division football rankings
- 1964 College Football All-America Team
- 1964 NCAA College Division football season
- 1964 NAIA football season
