= 1964 Florida Gators football team =

American college football season

1964 Florida Gators football
- Conference: Southeastern Conference
- Record: 7–3 (4–2 SEC)
- Head coach: Ray Graves (5th season)
- Offensive coordinator: Pepper Rodgers (3rd season)
- Defensive coordinator: Gene Ellenson (1st season)
- Home stadium: Florida Field

1964 Southeastern Conference football standings
	Conf.					Overall
Team	W		L		T	W		L		T
No. 1 Alabama $	8	–	0	–	0	10	–	1	–	0
Florida	4	–	2	–	0	7	–	3	–	0
Georgia	4	–	2	–	0	7	–	3	–	1
Kentucky	4	–	2	–	0	5	–	5	–	0
No. 7 LSU	4	–	2	–	1	8	–	2	–	1
Auburn	3	–	3	–	0	6	–	4	–	0
Ole Miss	2	–	4	–	1	5	–	5	–	1
Mississippi State	2	–	5	–	0	4	–	6	–	0
Vanderbilt	1	–	4	–	1	3	–	6	–	1
Tennessee	1	–	5	–	1	4	–	5	–	1
Tulane	1	–	5	–	0	3	–	7	–	0
$ – Conference champion; Georgia's game against Clemson and Tulane's game against Miami (FL) counted in the conference standings.; Rankings from AP Poll

The 1964 Florida Gators football team represented the University of Florida during the 1964 NCAA University Division football season. The season was the fifth for Ray Graves as the head coach of the Florida Gators football team. Graves' 1964 Florida Gators posted an overall record of 7–3 and a 4–2 Southeastern Conference (SEC) record, tying for second among the eleven SEC teams.

The season was Steve Spurrier's first season as quarterback.

== Schedule ==
Date	Opponent	Rank	Site	TV	Result	Attendance	Source
September 19	SMU*		Florida Field; Gainesville, FL	ABC	W 24–8	33,000	
September 26	at Mississippi State		Mississippi Veterans Memorial Stadium; Jackson, MS		W 16–13	42,100	
October 10	Ole Miss		Florida Field; Gainesville, FL		W 30–14	47,003	
October 17	South Carolina*^{†}		Florida Field; Gainesville, FL		W 37–0	43,000	
October 24	at No. 3 Alabama	No. 9	Denny Stadium; Tuscaloosa, AL (rivalry)		L 14–17	45,000	
October 31	Auburn	No. 10	Florida Field; Gainesville, FL (rivalry)		W 14–0	47,100	
November 7	vs. Georgia	No. 9	Gator Bowl Stadium; Jacksonville, FL (rivalry)		L 7–14	48,000	
November 21	at Florida State*		Doak Campbell Stadium; Tallahassee, FL (rivalry)		L 7–16	43,000	
November 28	Miami (FL)*		Florida Field; Gainesville, FL (rivalry)		W 12–10	31,118	
December 5	at LSU		Tiger Stadium; Baton Rouge, LA (rivalry)		W 20–6	65,000	
*Non-conference game; ^{†}Homecoming; Rankings from AP Poll released prior to the game

== Game summaries ==
=== SMU ===
The season opened with a 24–8 win over the SMU Mustangs. After quarterback Tom Shannon led the Gators to a 10–8 halftime lead, Spurrier entered the contest and threw a 56-yard pass to Jack Harper.

=== Mississippi State ===
In the second week of play, the Gators beat the Mississippi State Bulldogs, 16–13.

=== Ole Miss ===
Florida beat Ole Miss, 30–14.

=== South Carolina ===
At homecoming, Florida beat South Carolina, 37–0.

=== Alabama ===
Team	1	2	3	4	Total
#9 Florida	0	7	7	0	14
• #3 Alabama	0	7	0	10	17

- Date: October 24
- Location: Denny Stadium
  Tuscaloosa, Alabama
- Game attendance: 43,200

As they entered their 1964 homecoming game against Florida, Alabama was ranked No. 3 and Florida No. 9 in the AP Poll. Against the Gators, Alabama rallied for a 17–14 comeback victory after they scored ten unanswered points in the fourth quarter. After a scoreless first quarter, Florida took a 7–0 second quarter lead when Steve Spurrier threw a nine-yard touchdown pass to Randy Jackson. Alabama responded with a one-yard Steve Bowman touchdown run later in the quarter that tied the game 7–7 at halftime. In the third, the Gators retook the lead with a three-yard John Feiber touchdown run before the Crimson Tide started their fourth quarter rally. In the final period, a 30-yard Bowman touchdown run tied the game and a 21-yard David Ray field goal with just 3:06 left in the game. Spurrier then led the Gators on a drive that stalled at the Tide's seven-yard line where James Hall missed a field goal to tie the game and preserved the 17–14 Alabama win.

=== Auburn ===
The Gators beat the favored Auburn Tigers 14–0. The Gators picked off four passes, returning one for an 84-yard touchdown, and recovered three fumbles. Spurrier ran in the final score from 5 yards out.

=== Georgia ===
Despite Georgia's overall advantage in the series, Florida enjoyed a 10–2 streak from 1952 to 1963 under head coaches Bob Woodruff and Ray Graves. That changed with the arrival of Vince Dooley as the new head coach of the underdog 1964 Georgia Bulldogs. In a game where the Bulldogs' quarterback failed to complete a single pass and was intercepted twice, Dooleys' 'Dogs relied on their running game, a staunch second-half defense, and a little bit of luck to beat Graves' tenth-ranked Gators. With the game tied at 7–7 in the fourth quarter, Bulldogs placekicker Bob Etter lined up for a potential game-winning field goal. Instead, in a wild broken play, the Bulldogs' center and placeholder mishandled the snap, but Etter picked up the bobbled ball and ran it for a touchdown to win the game 14–7.

=== Florida State ===
This season was also notable as the first in which the Florida State Seminoles defeated the Gators. Even though many of the early games in the series were close (and the 1961 contest ended in a 3–3 tie), Florida State had yet to beat their in-state rivals in six attempts. The 1964 game would be the first time that the Gators would journey to Doak Campbell Stadium, and the Seminoles under coach Bill Peterson were enjoying their best season since joining the ranks of major college football programs. However, the Gators still felt confident that another victory was in the offing, coming out onto the playing field with the boast "Never, FSU, Never!" attached to their helmets.

Florida State quarterback Steve Tensi hit Fred Biletnikoff with a first-half touchdown, helping the Seminoles to a 13–0 lead at the half as the Gator offense fumbled four times, including once at the FSU one-yard line. Florida, led by quarterback Steve Spurrier, finally scored in the 3rd quarter to cut the lead to 13–7, but were unable to find the endzone again. Les Murdock kicked a 42-yard field goal to secure the win for FSU, 16–7.

=== Miami (FL) ===
Florida defeated the Miami Hurricanes, 12–10.

=== LSU ===
UF achieved a 20–6 win over the No. 7 Tigers in a game originally scheduled for Oct. 3 but postponed two months due to Hurricane Hilda approaching the Louisiana coast (the Category 4 storm made landfall near Morgan City that evening and dropped heavy rain on Baton Rouge as it moved inland). Particularly noteworthy is the fact that it was Spurrier's first win over LSU – the first of a long win streak that he would have over the Tigers as a player and head coach.

== Roster ==
1964 Florida Gators football team roster
Players
Coaches
Offense

Pos.	#	Name	Class
		Charles Casey
		Jack Harper
QB	11	Steve Spurrier	So

Defense

Pos.	#	Name	Class
DL		Jerry Anderson	So

Special teams

Pos.	#	Name	Class

Head coach

- Ray Graves

Coordinators/assistant coaches

Legend

- (C) Team captain
- (S) Suspended
- (I) Ineligible
- Injured
- Redshirt
