= 1964 Bluebonnet Bowl =

Ole Miss Rebels	Tulsa Golden Hurricane
(5–4–1)	(8–2)
7	14
Head coach: Johnny Vaught	Head coach: Glenn Dobbs
	AP / Coaches; NR / 18
	1	2	3	4	Total
Ole Miss	0	7	0	0	7
Tulsa	0	7	7	0	14
- Date: December 19, 1964
- Season: 1964
- Stadium: Rice Stadium
- Location: Houston, Texas
- Attendance: 50,000

The 1964 Bluebonnet Bowl was a college football postseason bowl game between the Tulsa Golden Hurricane and the Ole Miss Rebels.

== Background ==
After finishing 1st in the SEC three out of the last four years, the Rebels fell to 7th place in the Southeastern Conference, the first season without finishing 1st-4th since finishing 11th in 1950. This was the 8th straight bowl appearance for the Rebels, in their first ever Bluebonnet Bowl. The Golden Hurricane finished 2nd in the Missouri Valley Conference after losing to Cincinnati earlier in the year. One highlight was Jerry Rhome, a quarterback who finished 2nd in the Heisman Trophy vote by a close margin. The Golden Hurricane were invited to their first bowl since 1953.

== Game summary ==
Jim Weatherly gave the Rebels a 7–0 lead in the second quarter on his 1-yard plunge into the endzone. But the lead would not last long. Jerry Rhome culminated a 72-yard, 8 play drive on a touchdown run of his own to make it 7–7 at halftime. Midway through the third quarter, Rhome struck again, throwing a touchdown pass of 35 yards to Eddie Fletcher. From there on, Tulsa's defense held firm, holding Mississippi to less than 250 yards. In losing efforts, Weatherly went 16-of-24, but threw for only 113 yards while throwing 2 interceptions. Mike Dennis rushed for 73 yards on 17 carries while catching nine passes for 114 yards. For the Golden Hurricane, Rhome went 22-of-36 for 252 yards and rushed for 29 yards on 22 carries, scoring both Tulsa touchdowns. This was Tulsa's first bowl win since 1944.

== Aftermath ==
Tulsa returned to the Bluebonnet Bowl the following year, but lost. The Golden Hurricane did not win another bowl game until 1991.

== Statistics ==
Statistics	Ole Miss	Tulsa
First downs	10	19
Rushing yards	104	71
Passing yards	113	252
Total yards	217	323
Passing (C–A–I)	16–24–2	22–36–1
Punts–average	8–31.1	7–31.6
Fumbles–lost	2–0	1–0
Penalties–yards	4–50	4–30
