= 1965 Orange Bowl =

American college football game

- 31st Orange Bowl
- The Miami Orange Bowl in Miami, Florida, hosted the Orange Bowl.
Texas Longhorns	Alabama Crimson Tide
(9–1)	(10–0)
SWC	SEC
21	17
Head coach: Darrell Royal	Head coach: Bear Bryant
AP / Coaches; 5 / 5	AP / Coaches; 1 / 1
	1	2	3	4	Total
Texas	7	14	0	0	21
Alabama	0	7	7	3	17
- Date: January 1, 1965
- Season: 1964
- Stadium: Orange Bowl
- Location: Miami, Florida
- MVP: Joe Namath (Alabama QB)
- Favorite: Alabama by 3 points
- Referee: E.D. Cavette (SEC; split crew: SEC, SWC)
- Attendance: 72,880

United States TV coverage
- Network: NBC
- Announcers: Jim Simpson, Bud Wilkinson
- Nielsen ratings: 20.6

The 1965 Orange Bowl, part of the 1964–65 bowl season, was the 31st edition of the college football bowl game, played at the Orange Bowl in Miami, Florida, on Friday, January 1. Part of the 1964–65 bowl season, It matched the top-ranked Alabama Crimson Tide of the Southeastern Conference (SEC), and the #5 Texas Longhorns of the Southwest Conference (SWC). Texas built an early lead and won 21–17.

This was the first Orange Bowl game played at night, and the first live national network telecast of a college football game during prime time. NBC acquired the television rights and the kickoff was moved to follow the network's Rose Bowl telecast, without competition from other bowls. It also was the first Orange Bowl in twelve years not to include a team from the Big Eight Conference.

Despite Alabama's loss they were still named co-national champions (along with Arkansas).

== Teams ==
=== Alabama ===
Alabama finished the regular season as both SEC and national champions with a record of 10–0. During the Iron Bowl, Alabama accepted a bid to play in the Orange Bowl from bowl officials. It was fourth Orange Bowl appearance for Alabama and their 18th bowl game. With USC upsetting Notre Dame 20–17 on the final weekend of the season, Alabama was selected as the 1964 national champions by both final major polls, released prior to the bowl games.

=== Texas ===
The defending national champion Longhorns finished the regular season with a 9–1 record Only a 14–13 loss against Arkansas in week five kept the Longhorns from repeating as national champions.

== Game summary ==
After the defense stopped Alabama at the one-yard line on fourth down, Texas responded quickly with the first score of the evening. After moving the ball 20 yards, Longhorn running back Ernie Koy took the ball 79-yards for a 7–0 Texas lead with only :23 remaining in the first quarter. Texas extended their lead to 14–0 on their next offensive possession when George Sauer caught a 69-yard touchdown reception from Jim Hudson. Alabama cut the lead in half later in the second quarter when Joe Namath hit Wayne Trimble for a 7-yard touchdown reception. On the following possession, Alabama blocked a 35-yard David Conway field goal attempt, recovered the ball, but fumbled it on the return, which Texas recovered. Ernie Koy capped the ensuing 38-yard drive with a two-yard touchdown run to give the Longhorns a 21–7 lead at halftime.

In the second half, Texas was held scoreless, but Alabama was unable to take the lead with only ten additional points. The first score was a 20-yard Ray Perkins touchdown reception from Namath and the second on a 26-yard David Ray field goal early in the fourth quarter. Although on the losing side, Alabama quarterback Namath was selected as the game's outstanding player for completing 18 of 37 passes for 255 yards and a pair of touchdowns.

=== Scoring ===
Scoring summary

Quarter	Time	Drive			Team	Scoring information	Score	
Quarter	Time	Plays	Yards	TOP	Team	Scoring information	Texas	Alabama
1	0:23	2	99		Texas	Ernie Koy 79-yard touchdown run, David Conway kick good	7	0
2	9:51	4	80		Texas	George Sauer 69-yard touchdown reception from Jim Hudson, Conway kick good	14	0
2	4:34	14	87		Alabama	Wayne Trimble 7-yard touchdown reception from Joe Namath, David Ray kick good	14	7
2	0:27	4	38		Texas	Koy 2-yard touchdown run, Conway kick good	21	7
3	4:34	9	63		Alabama	Ray Perkins 20-yard touchdown reception from Namath, Ray kick good	21	14
4	14:54	9	38		Alabama	26-yard field goal by Ray	21	17
"TOP" = time of possession. For other American football terms, see Glossary of American football.							21	17

== Statistics ==
Statistics	Texas	Alabama
First downs	15	18
Rushes–yards	51–212	26–49
Passing yards	101	298
Passes (C–A–I)	4–17–1	20–44–2
Total offense	68–313	70–347
Punts–average	9–36.8	5–3.4
Fumbles–lost	2–1	3–1
Turnovers	2	3
Penalties–yards	3–25	4–46

== Aftermath ==
The following day, Namath signed his record contract with the New York Jets of the American Football League (AFL), estimated at $400,000 over three years.

Both final polls were released at the end of the regular season, prior to the bowls.
