= Doug Moreau =

American football player (born 1945)

No. 82
- Position: Tight end

Personal information
- Born: February 15, 1945 (age 81); Thibodaux, Louisiana, U.S.
- Listed height: 6 ft 1 in (1.85 m)
- Listed weight: 215 lb (98 kg)

Career information
- High school: Baton Rouge (LA) University
- College: LSU
- AFL draft: 1966: 19th round, 164th overall pick

Career history
- Miami Dolphins (1966–1969)

Awards and highlights
- First-team All-SEC (1964)

Career statistics
- Receptions: 73
- Yards: 926
- Touchdowns: 6
- Stats at Pro Football Reference

Douglas Paul Moreau (born February 15, 1945) is an American former professional football tight end in the American Football League (AFL) and current broadcaster along with being a literature teacher. He was selected by the Miami Dolphins in the sixth round of the 1966 AFL draft. He played college football at LSU.

== Broadcasting career ==
Moreau worked as both an LSU football radio analyst and sideline reporter from 1972 to 1981. From 1982 through 1987, he was the color analyst for LSU football games on TigerVision. He returned to the radio booth as color analyst in 1988.

== Professional career ==
Moreau has served as assistant district attorney, judge and district attorney in East Baton Rouge Parish, Louisiana. He was Assistant District Attorney for the 19th Judicial District from 1974 to 1978; Judge, Baton Rouge City Court, Division B from 1978 to 1979; Judge, 19th Judicial District Court, Division E from 1979 to 1990 and served as District Attorney, 19th Judicial District from 1991 to 2009.
