= 1964 NCAA University Division football rankings =

- Season: 1964
- Bowl season: 1964–65 bowl games
- Preseason No. 1: Ole Miss
- End of season champions: Alabama

Two human polls comprised the 1964 NCAA University Division football rankings. Unlike most sports, college football's governing body, the NCAA, does not bestow a national championship, instead that title is bestowed by one or more different polling agencies. There are two main weekly polls that begin in the preseason—the AP Poll and the Coaches Poll.

== Legend ==
	Increase in ranking
	Decrease in ranking
	Not ranked previous week
	National champion
(#–#)	Win–loss record
(Italics)	Number of first place votes
т	Tied with team above or below also with this symbol

== AP Poll ==
The final AP Poll was released on November 30, at the end of the 1964 regular season, a month before the bowls. The poll ranked only the top ten teams from 1962 through 1967.

	Preseason Aug	Week 1 Sep 28	Week 2 Oct 5	Week 3 Oct 12	Week 4 Oct 19	Week 5 Oct 26	Week 6 Nov 2	Week 7 Nov 9	Week 8 Nov 16	Week 9 Nov 23	Week 10 (Final) Nov 30	
1.	Ole Miss (20)	Texas (2–0) (14)	Texas (3–0) (32)	Texas (4–0) (30)	Ohio State (4–0) (35)	Ohio State (5–0) (32)	Notre Dame (6–0) (29)	Notre Dame (7–0) (26)	Notre Dame (8–0) (34)	Notre Dame (9–0) (36)	Alabama (10–0) (34 1/2)	1.
2.	Oklahoma (15)	USC (2–0) (17)	Illinois (2–0) (6)	Ohio State (3–0) (7)	Notre Dame (4–0) (2)	Notre Dame (5–0) (6)	Ohio State (6–0) (11)	Alabama (8–0) (11)	Alabama (9–0) (9)	Alabama (9–0) (6)	Arkansas (10–0) (11 1/2)	2.
3.	Illinois (10)	Illinois (1–0) (7)	Alabama (3–0) (3)	Alabama (4–0) (2)	Alabama (5–0) (5)	Alabama (6–0) (8)	Alabama (7–0) (7)	Arkansas (8–0) (3)	Arkansas (9–0) (2)	Arkansas (10–0) (4)	Notre Dame (9–1) (6)	3.
4.	Texas	Alabama (2–0) (4)	Ohio State (2–0)	Notre Dame (3–0) (1)	Arkansas (5–0) (2)	Arkansas (6–0) (1)	Arkansas (7–0) (1)	Nebraska (8–0)	Nebraska (9–0)	Michigan (8–1) (1)	Michigan (8–1) (3)	4.
5.	Ohio State	Ohio State (1–0) (2)	Kentucky (3–0) (5)	Michigan (3–0)	Nebraska (5–0)	Nebraska (6–0)	Nebraska (7–0)	Texas (7–1)	Texas (8–1)	Texas (8–1)	Texas (9–1)	5.
6.	Alabama (1)	Navy (2–0) (1)	Notre Dame (2–0)	Nebraska (4–0)	Texas (4–1)	Texas (5–1)	Texas (6–1)	Michigan (6–1)	Michigan (7–1)	LSU (7–1–1)	Nebraska (9–1)	6.
7.	Washington (1)	Auburn (2–0) (2)	Michigan (2–0) (1)	Syracuse (3–1)	LSU (4–0)	Oregon (6–0)	Georgia Tech (7–0)	Ohio State (6–1)	Ohio State (7–1)	Nebraska (9–1)	LSU (7–1–1)	7.
8.	Auburn (1)	Michigan (1–0)	Nebraska (3–0)	Arkansas (4–0)	Syracuse (4–1)	Georgia Tech (6–0)	LSU (5–0–1)	Oregon State (7–1) (1)	LSU (6–1–1)	Oregon State (8–2)	Oregon State (8–2)	8.
9.	Syracuse	Notre Dame (1–0)	Arkansas (3–0) т	LSU (3–0)	Florida (4–0)	LSU (4–0–1)	Florida (5–1)	LSU (5–1–1)	Syracuse (7–2)	Ohio State (7–2)	Ohio State (7–2)	9.
10.	Navy	Washington (1–1) (1)	Michigan State (1–1) т	Florida State (4–0)	Florida State (5–0)	Florida (4–1)	Purdue (5–1)	Georgia Tech (7–1)	Oregon (7–1–1)	Florida State (8–1–1)	USC (7–3)	10.
	Preseason Aug	Week 1 Sep 28	Week 2 Oct 5	Week 3 Oct 12	Week 4 Oct 19	Week 5 Oct 26	Week 6 Nov 2	Week 7 Nov 9	Week 8 Nov 16	Week 9 Nov 23	Week 10 (Final) Nov 30	
		Dropped: Ole Miss; Oklahoma; Syracuse	Dropped: Auburn; Navy; USC; Washington	Dropped: Illinois; Kentucky; Michigan State	Dropped: Michigan	Dropped: Florida State; Syracuse	Dropped: Oregon	Dropped: Florida; Purdue	Dropped: Georgia Tech; Oregon State	Dropped: Oregon; Syracuse	Dropped: Florida State	

== Final Coaches Poll ==
The final UPI Coaches Poll was released prior to the bowl games, on December 1.
Alabama received 22 of the 35 first-place votes; Arkansas received seven, Notre Dame four, and Michigan two.

Ranking	Team	Conference	Bowl
1	Alabama	SEC	Lost Orange, 17–21
2	Arkansas	Southwest	Won Cotton, 10–7
3	Notre Dame	Independent	none
4	Michigan	Big Ten	Won Rose, 34–7
5	Texas	Southwest	Won Orange, 21–17
6	Nebraska	Big Eight	Lost Cotton, 7–10
7	LSU	SEC	Won Sugar, 13–10
8	Oregon State	AAWU (Pac-8)	Lost Rose, 7–34
9	Ohio State	Big Ten	none
10	USC	AAWU (Pac-8)	none
11	Florida State	Independent	Won Gator, 36–19
12	Syracuse	Independent	Lost Sugar, 10–13
13	Princeton	Ivy	none
14	Penn State	Independent	none
14	Utah	WAC	Won Liberty, 32–6
16	Illinois	Big Ten	none
16	New Mexico	WAC	none
18	Tulsa	MVC	Won Bluebonnet, 14–7
18	Missouri	Big Eight	none
20	Michigan State	Big Ten	none
20	Mississippi	SEC	Lost Bluebonnet, 7–14

- Notre Dame did not participate in bowl games from 1925 through 1968.
- Prior to the 1975 season, the Big Ten and Pac-8 conferences allowed only one postseason participant each, for the Rose Bowl.
- The Ivy League has prohibited its members from participating in postseason football since the league was officially formed in 1954.

== Litkenhous Ratings ==
The following teams were ranked as the top 25 teams in the final Litkenhous Ratings, released in December 1964:

1. Alabama
2. Michigan
3. Notre Dame
4. Arkansas
5. Texas
6. USC
7. Florida State
8. Florida
9. Ohio State
10. Nebraska
11. Illinois
12. Utah
13. Tulsa
14. Purdue
15. Penn State
16. Syracuse
17. UCLA
18. Ole Miss
19. LSU
20. Michigan State
21. Utah State
22. Oregon State
23. Oregon
24. Minnesota
25. Oklahoma
