= Tucker Frederickson =

American football player (born 1943)

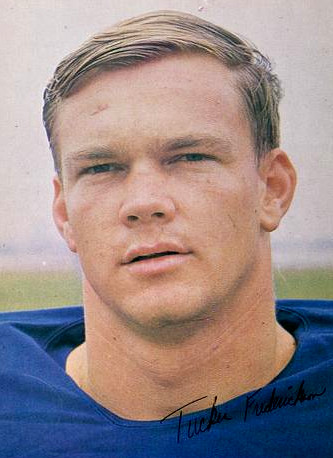
- Frederickson with the New York Giants in 1965

No. 24
- Position: Running back

Personal information
- Born: January 12, 1943 (age 83); Hollywood, Florida, U.S.
- Listed height: 6 ft 2 in (1.88 m)
- Listed weight: 220 lb (100 kg)

Career information
- High school: South Broward (Hollywood)
- College: Auburn
- NFL draft: 1965: 1st round, 1st overall pick

Career history
- New York Giants (1965–1971)

Awards and highlights
- Pro Bowl (1965); Consensus All-American (1964); SEC Player of the Year (1964); 2× Jacobs Blocking Trophy (1963, 1964); First-team All-SEC (1964); Second-team All-SEC (1963)

Career NFL statistics
- Rushing yards: 2,209
- Rushing average: 3.4
- Receptions: 128
- Receiving yards: 1,011
- Total touchdowns: 17
- Stats at Pro Football Reference
- College Football Hall of Fame

Ivan Charles "Tucker" Frederickson (born January 12, 1943) is an American former professional football player who was a running back for the New York Giants of the National Football League (NFL). He was an All-American in college at Auburn, a Heisman Trophy runner-up, the first overall pick of the 1965 NFL draft, and a Pro Bowl fullback with the Giants.

== Biography ==
Frederickson graduated from South Broward High School in Hollywood, Florida. A two-way player, he then attended Auburn University in Alabama, averaging 4.4 yards per carry on offense and leading the Tigers football team in interceptions as a safety on defense. In 1963, he won the Jacobs Award as the best blocking back in the Southeastern Conference. He won it again in 1964, and was sixth in the Heisman Trophy race. Coach Shug Jordan called him "the most complete football player I've ever seen". He was an All-American in 1964.

Frederickson was taken as the first overall pick in the 1965 NFL draft by the New York Giants, playing six seasons for them before a knee injury forced his retirement in 1971. He was inducted in the College Football Hall of Fame in 1994.

Frederickson is referred to by Brian Piccolo (James Caan) as the man to beat in 1971's Brian's Song as both of them went to the same high school. In fact they went to different high schools, Frederickson to South Broward and Piccolo to Central Catholic (now St. Thomas Aquinas). Tucker went to the coveted Auburn University while Piccolo had to "settle" for Wake Forest.

== NFL career statistics ==
Legend
**Bold**	Career high

Year	Team	Games		Rushing					Receiving				
Year	Team	GP	GS	Att	Yds	Avg	Lng	TD	Rec	Yds	Avg	Lng	TD
1965	NYG	13	10	**195**	**659**	3.4	**41**	**5**	24	177	7.4	31	1
1967	NYG	10	8	97	311	3.2	17	2	19	153	8.1	29	0
1968	NYG	14	6	142	486	3.4	19	1	10	64	6.4	14	2
1969	NYG	5	4	33	136	**4.1**	19	0	14	95	6.8	16	1
1970	NYG	14	12	120	375	3.1	15	1	**40**	**408**	**10.2**	**57**	**3**
1971	NYG	10	8	64	242	3.8	37	0	21	114	5.4	20	1
Career		66	48	651	2,209	3.4	41	9	128	1,011	7.9	57	8
