= 1964 Dayton Flyers football team =

American college football season

1964 Dayton Flyers football
- Conference: Independent
- Record: 3–7
- Head coach: Pete Ankney (2nd season)
- Home stadium: Baujan Field

1964 NCAA University Division independents football records
	Conf.			Overall
Team	W	L	T	W		L		T
No. 3 Notre Dame		–		9	–	1	–	0
Florida State		–		9	–	1	–	1
Colgate		–		7	–	2	–	0
Georgia Tech		–		7	–	3	–	0
Syracuse		–		7	–	4	–	0
Villanova		–		6	–	2	–	0
Boston College		–		6	–	3	–	0
Southern Miss		–		6	–	3	–	0
New Mexico State		–		6	–	4	–	0
Penn State		–		6	–	4	–	0
Memphis State		–		5	–	4	–	0
Utah State		–		5	–	4	–	1
Holy Cross		–		5	–	5	–	0
Buffalo		–		4	–	4	–	1
Colorado State		–		5	–	6	–	0
Air Force		–		4	–	5	–	1
Miami (FL)		–		4	–	5	–	1
Xavier		–		4	–	5	–	1
Army		–		4	–	6	–	0
West Texas State		–		4	–	6	–	0
San Jose State		–		4	–	6	–	0
Pittsburgh		–		3	–	5	–	2
Navy		–		3	–	6	–	1
Dayton		–		3	–	7	–	0
Detroit		–		3	–	7	–	0
Boston University		–		2	–	7	–	0
Houston		–		2	–	6	–	1
Texas Western		–		0	–	8	–	2
Rankings from AP Poll

The 1964 Dayton Flyers football team represented the University of Dayton as an independent during the 1964 NCAA University Division football season. In their second season under head coach Pete Ankney, the Flyers compiled a 3–7 record. Dayton played their home games at Baujan Field in Dayton, Ohio.

== Schedule ==
Date	Opponent	Site	Result	Attendance	Source
September 19	Saint Joseph's (IN)	Baujan Field; Dayton, OH	W 41–0		
September 26	at Cincinnati	Nippert Stadium; Cincinnati, OH	L 10–20	23,000	
October 3	at Bowling Green	University Stadium; Bowling Green, OH	L 0–35	13,409	
October 10	Louisville	Baujan Field; Dayton, OH	L 7–21	11,750	
October 17	Abilene Christian^{†}	Baujan Field; Dayton, OH	W 21–14	13,636–14,500	
October 23	at Detroit	University of Detroit Stadium; Detroit, MI	L 6–21	12,050	
October 31	at Ohio	Peden Stadium; Athens, OH	L 0–24	12,200	
November 7	Xavier	Baujan Field; Dayton, OH	L 7–12		
November 14	at Miami (OH)	Miami Field; Oxford, OH	L 21–28	14,051	
November 21	Kent State	Baujan Field; Dayton, OH	W 16–11	3,500	
^{†}Homecoming; Source:
