= 1964 Pittsburgh Panthers football team =

American college football season

1964 Pittsburgh Panthers football
- Conference: Independent
- Record: 3–5–2
- Head coach: John Michelosen (10th season)
- Home stadium: Pitt Stadium

1964 NCAA University Division independents football records
	Conf.			Overall
Team	W	L	T	W		L		T
No. 3 Notre Dame		–		9	–	1	–	0
Florida State		–		9	–	1	–	1
Colgate		–		7	–	2	–	0
Georgia Tech		–		7	–	3	–	0
Syracuse		–		7	–	4	–	0
Villanova		–		6	–	2	–	0
Boston College		–		6	–	3	–	0
Southern Miss		–		6	–	3	–	0
New Mexico State		–		6	–	4	–	0
Penn State		–		6	–	4	–	0
Memphis State		–		5	–	4	–	0
Utah State		–		5	–	4	–	1
Holy Cross		–		5	–	5	–	0
Buffalo		–		4	–	4	–	1
Colorado State		–		5	–	6	–	0
Air Force		–		4	–	5	–	1
Miami (FL)		–		4	–	5	–	1
Xavier		–		4	–	5	–	1
Army		–		4	–	6	–	0
West Texas State		–		4	–	6	–	0
San Jose State		–		4	–	6	–	0
Pittsburgh		–		3	–	5	–	2
Navy		–		3	–	6	–	1
Dayton		–		3	–	7	–	0
Detroit		–		3	–	7	–	0
Boston University		–		2	–	7	–	0
Houston		–		2	–	6	–	1
Texas Western		–		0	–	8	–	2
Rankings from AP Poll

The 1964 Pittsburgh Panthers football team represented the University of Pittsburgh as an independent during the 1964 NCAA University Division football season. The team compiled a 3–5–2 record under head coach John Michelosen. The team played its home games at Pitt Stadium in Pittsburgh. The team's statistical leaders included Fred Mazurek with 686 passing yards and Barry McKnight with 551 rushing yards.

== Schedule ==
Date	Opponent	Site	Result	Attendance	Source
September 12	UCLA	Pitt Stadium; Pittsburgh, PA	L 12–17	41,333	
September 26	at Oregon	Multnomah Stadium; Portland, OR	L 13–22	24,662	
October 3	William & Mary	Pitt Stadium; Pittsburgh, PA	W 34–7	23,264	
October 10	West Virginia	Pitt Stadium; Pittsburgh, PA (rivalry)	W 14–0	37,179	
October 17	at Miami (FL)	Miami Orange Bowl; Miami, FL	T 20–20	34,663	
October 24	Navy	Pitt Stadium; Pittsburgh, PA	T 14–14	46,656	
October 31	at Syracuse	Archbold Stadium; Syracuse, NY (rivalry)	L 6–21	35,000	
November 7	No. 1 Notre Dame	Pitt Stadium; Pittsburgh, PA (rivalry)	L 15–17	56,628	
November 14	at Army	Michie Stadium; West Point, NY	W 24–8	31,963	
November 21	at Penn State	Beaver Stadium; University Park, PA (rivalry)	L 0–28	50,170	
Rankings from AP Poll released prior to the game; Source:

== Preseason ==
On March 17, Coach Michelosen opened his tenth spring practice. More than 50 players took part. Nine of eleven starters were lost to graduation, but 21 lettermen returned. Basketball star Brian Generalovich vied for one of the end positions. Quarterback Fred Mazurek and halfback Bill Bodle missed drills due to baseball team commitments. The spring session ended with a televised scrimmage on April 18. Pitt and the Naval Academy had a track meet at 11:30 a.m., and the football game followed at 2:00 p.m. The Blues (first and fourth units) beat the Whites (second and third units) 22–6. End Bill Howley was the star with two touchdowns. He caught a 14-yard pass from Kenny Lucas for the first score and then closed the scoring with a 95-yard kick-off return.

On August 24, 62 Panthers convened at Allegheny College in Meadville for the start of fall practice. The squad worked out twice -a-day for two weeks and held a scrimmage on September 5 prior to returning to Pittsburgh for the start of classes.

== Game summaries ==
=== UCLA ===
Week 1:UCLA at Pitt

Team	1	2	3	4	Total
• UCLA	7	10	0	0	17
Pitt	0	6	6	0	12

- Date: September 12, 1964
- Location: Pitt Stadium
  Pittsburgh, PA
- Game start: 1:00 p.m.
- Game attendance: 41,333
- Game weather: cool and cloudy

Scoring summary
1	UCLA	Steve Durban 7-yard pass from Larry Zeno (Zeno kick)	UCLA 7–0
2	PITT	Fred Mazurek 4-yard run (pass failed)	UCLA 7–6
2	UCLA	Dick Witcher 14-yard pass from Zeno (Zeno kick)	UCLA 14–6
2	UCLA	Zeno 25-yard field goal	UCLA 17–6
3	PITT	Barry McKnight 2-yard run (pass failed)	UCLA 17–12

On September 12, the Panthers opened their season by hosting the UCLA Bruins. Pitt led the all-time series 4–2. UCLA Coach Bill Barnes had 26 returning lettermen on his squad that lost to Pitt 20–0 the previous season. The Panthers were a 7-point favorite in the NBC national televised game of the week.

UCLA disappointed the 41,333 partisan fans at the stadium by beating the Panthers 17–12. Bruins' quarterback Larry Zeno threw 2 touchdown passes and kicked both extra points and a field goal in the first half. UCLA lead 17–6 at the break. Pitt scored in the second quarter on a Fred Mazurek 4-yard run to cap a 9-play, 75-yard drive. The two-point conversion pass was intercepted. Pitt cut the lead to 17–12 in the third period with a 7-play, 38-yard drive. Barry McKnight scored on a 2-yard run. The two point conversion pass was incomplete. Then the Pitt offense played most of the final period in UCLA territory, but could not score.

The Pitt starting line-up for the game against UCLA was Bill Howley (left end), Jim Jones (left tackle), Ray Popp (left guard), Paul Cercel (center), Bernie LaQuinta (right guard), Ron Linaburg (right tackle), Mitch Zalnasky (right end), Fred Mazurek (quarterback), Dale Stewart (left halfback), Eric Crabtree (right halfback) and Barry McKnight (fullback). Substitutes appearing in the game for Pitt were Phil Dahar, John Verkleeren, Dennis Bernick, John Schmidt, Tom Raymond, Joe Novogratz, Robert Sorochak, James Irwin, Marty Schottenheimer, Kenny Lucas, Francis Novak, James Dodaro, Bill Bodle, Peter Billey and Jim Flanigan.

Statistics	UCLA	PITT
First downs	16	16
Plays–yards	66–279	65–330
Rushes–yards	45–177	39–218
Passing yards	102	112
Passing: comp–att–int	13–21-0	8–18–2
Turnovers	0	5
Time of possession	na	na

Team	Category	Player	Statistics
UCLA	Passing	Larry Zeno	12/20, 108 yards
UCLA	Rushing	Larry Zeno	14 carries, 105 yards
UCLA	Receiving	Mike Haffner	5 receptions, 51 yards
PITT	Passing	Fred Mazurek	5/8, 76 yards, 1 int
PITT	Rushing	Fred Mazurek	10 carries, 81 yards
PITT	Receiving	Mitch Zalnasky	3 receptions, 41 yards

=== at Oregon ===
Week 2: Pitt at Oregon

Team	1	2	3	4	Total
Pitt	0	7	0	6	13
• Oregon	0	14	0	8	22

- Date: September 26, 1964
- Location: Multnomah Stadium
  Portland, OR
- Game start: 8:00 p.m.
- Game attendance: 24,666
- Game weather: cool
- Referee: Jack Sprenger

Scoring summary
2	PITT	Fred Mazurek 1-yard run (Jim Jones kick)	PITT 7–0
2	ORE	Steve Bunker 7-yard pass from Bob Berry (Mike Brundage kick)	TIED 7–7
2	ORE	Dennis Keller 1-yard run (Dave Tobey kick)	ORE 14–7
4	PITT	Mazurek 1-yard run (run failed)	ORE 14–13
4	ORE	Ray Palm 18-yard pass from Berry (Bunker pass from Berry)	ORE 22–13

Game #2 on Pitt's schedule was in Portland, OR against the Oregon Ducks . The Panthers departed Pittsburgh early Friday (September 25), and had a stopover in Billings, MT for a brief workout at the East Montana College of Education. Oregon Coach Len Casanova had 18 returning lettermen including All-American quarterback candidate Bob Berry. The Ducks were on a 5 game win streak, but Pitt led the all-time series 2–0.

The Oregon Ducks extended their win steak to six games by defeating the Panthers 22–13. Early in the second period, Marty Schottenheimer intercepted a Bob Berry pass and returned it to the Oregon 16-yard line. Fred Mazurek capped the drive with a 1 yard quarterback sneak. Jim Jones added the extra point. Oregon answered in less than 3 minutes, as Berry connected with Sullivan for a 56-yard pass play to the Panthers 6-yard line. On second down Berry passed 7 yards to Steve Bunker for the touchdown and Mike Brundage booted the extra point. The Ducks went 69 yards for their second touchdown the next time they got possession, with Dennis Keller scoring on a 1-yard run. Dave Tobey kicked the extra point from the 25-yard line after a holding penalty was assessed to the Ducks. The Panthers did everything offensively in the second half except score enough to win. After the kick-off they drove 59 yards to the 2-yard line. Halfback Dale Stewart fumbled into the end zone and Oregon recovered. Early in the final period, the Panthers drove to the Ducks 9-yard line and lost the ball on downs. The defense forced a punt and Eric Crabtree returned it to the Oregon 25-yard line. Fred Mazurek scored on the sixth play. Pitt opted to try a 2-point conversion, but Mazurek was sacked on the 5-yard line. Pitt regained possession on their 27-yard line. Stewart fumbled and Oregon recovered. Then Berry threw an interception and Eric Crabtree ran 82 yards for the apparent go-ahead score, but an official called offside on the Panthers to nullify the play. Six plays later Ray Palm caught Berry's second touchdown pass. Berry passed to Bunker for the 2-point conversion. The Panthers were 0–2.

The Pitt starting lineup for the game against Oregon was Bill Howley (left end), Jim Jones (left tackle), Ray Popp (left guard), Paul Cercel (center), Bernie LaQuinta (right guard), Ron Linaburg (right tackle), Mitch Zalnasky (right end), Fred Mazurek (quarterback), Dale Stewart (left halfback), Bill Bodle (right halfback) and Barry McKnight (fullback). Substitutes appearing in the game for Pitt were Phil Dahar, Mike Rosborough, Dennis Bernick, Bob Guzinsky, Joe Novogratz, Tom Qualey, Marty Schottenheimer, Fred Hoaglin, Robert Sorochak, James Irwin, John Schmidt, George Macko, Kenny Lucas, Francis Novak, Joseph Pohl, Dewey Chester, James Dodaro, Eric Crabtree and Jim Flanigan.

Statistics	PITT	ORE
First downs	22	12
Plays–yards	70–373	51–230
Rushes–yards	54–264	35–72
Passing yards	109	158
Passing: comp–att–int	8–16–1	8–16–1
Turnovers	4	1
Time of possession	na	na

Team	Category	Player	Statistics
PITT	Passing	Fred Mazurek	8/15, 109 yards, 1 int
PITT	Rushing	Fred Mazurek	22 carries, 119 yards
PITT	Receiving	James Dadaro	2 receptions, 54 yards
ORE	Passing	Bob Berry	7/15, 117 yards, 1 int
ORE	Rushing	Dennis Keller	19 carries, 39 yards
ORE	Receiving	Corky Sullivan	2 reception, 69 yards

=== William & Mary ===
Week 3:W&M at Pitt

Team	1	2	3	4	Total
William & Mary	0	7	0	0	7
• Pitt	0	20	7	7	34

- Date: October 3, 1964
- Location: Pitt Stadium
  Pittsburgh, PA
- Game start: 1:30 p.m.
- Game attendance: 23,264
- Game weather: sunny

Scoring summary
2	PITT	Barry McKnight 1-yard run (Howard Heit kick)	PITT 7–0
2	PITT	Robert Dyer 1-yard run (kick failed)	PITT 13–0
2	W&M	Chuck Albertson 83-yard kick-off return (Sam Miller kick)	PITT 13–7
2	PITT	Eric Crabtree 5-yard run (Heit fkick)	PITT 20–7
3	PITT	Bill Howley 9-yard pass from Fred Mazurek (Heit kick)	PITT 27–7
4	PITT	Kenny Lucas 6-yard run (Heit kick)	PITT 34–7

On October 3, the Panthers hosted the Willian & Mary Indians for their Syria Shrine Charity Game. The Indians were 1–1 on the season under first-year head coach and future Hall-of-Famer Marv Levy. The Tribe had beaten VMI (14–12) and lost to Navy (35–6). Scott Swan, the Tribe's leading rusher, was injured and did not play. In 1949 the Panthers beat the Indians 13–7 in their only other meeting. Coach Michelosen had to shuffle his starting lineup due to injuries: halfbacks Bill Bodle (thigh bruise) and Dale Stewart (damaged rib cartilage); tackles Ron Linaburg (knee injury and ankle sprain) and Jim Jones (damaged foot) and guard Bernie Laquinta (turf toe) did not play.

In front of 23, 264 fans, the Panthers earned their first victory of the 1964 season by beating William & Mary 34–7. Six different Panthers scored. Barry McKnight, Bob Dyer, Eric Crabtree, Bill Howley and Kenny Lucas each scored a touchdown, and Howard Heit kicked 4 extra points. Pitt quarterback Fred Mazurek completed 10 of 16 passes for 141 yards and carried the ball 8 times for 87 yards. In the second quarter, William & Mary running back Chuck Albertson returned a kick-off 86 yards for their only touchdown. Sam Miller kicked the extra point.

The Pitt starting lineup for the game against William & Mary was Brian Generalovich (left end), Dennis Bernick (left tackle), Ray Popp (left guard), Marty Schottenheimer (center), James Irwin (right guard), Al Keiser (right tackle), Mitch Zalnasky (right end), Fred Mazurek (quarterback), James Dodaro (left halfback), Eric Crabtree (right halfback) and Barry McKnight (fullback). Substitutes appearing in the game for Pitt were Phil Dahar, Howard Heit, Ron Simentel, Gabe Tamburino, Wayne Anderson, Bob Guzinsky, Joe Novogratz, Tom Qualey, Paul Cercel, Jock Beachler, Fred Hoaglin, Bob Taylor, Robert Sorochak, Dan Picciano, Ronald Cimino, Tom Raymond, John Schmidt, Robert Trethaway, Bill Howley, Mike Rosborough, James Eskridge, Kurt Wentzel, John Cullen, Kenny Lucas, Joseph Pohl, Ed Assid, Ed James, Francis Novak, Peter Smith, Dewey Chester, James Elmore, Bill Mullett, Bob Dyer, Peter Billey, Jim Flanigan, Carmen Sporio and William Beck.

Statistics	W&M	PITT
First downs	9	26
Plays–yards	51–129	77–495
Rushes–yards	41–119	50–301
Passing yards	10	194
Passing: comp–att–int	1–10–3	14–27–3
Turnovers	3	4
Time of possession	na	na

Team	Category	Player	Statistics
W&M	Passing	Jack Becker	1/5, 10 yards, 1 int
W&M	Rushing	Donnie McGuire	6 carries, 43 yards
W&M	Receiving	Jim LoFrese	1 receptions, 10 yards
PITT	Passing	Fred Mazurek	10/16, 141 yards, 1 int
PITT	Rushing	Fred Mazurek	8 carries, 87 yards
PITT	Receiving	Eric Crabtree	4 reception, 59 yards

=== West Virginia ===
Week 4:WVU at Pitt

Team	1	2	3	4	Total
West Virginia	0	0	0	0	0
• Pitt	7	7	0	0	14

- Date: October 10, 1964
- Location: Pitt Stadium
  Pittsburgh, PA
- Game start: 1:30 p.m.
- Game attendance: 37,179
- Game weather: cold, cloudy and windy

Scoring summary
1	PITT	Fred Mazurek 1-yard run (Jim Jones kick)	PITT 7–0
4	PITT	Eric Crabtree 9-yard pass from Mazurek (Jones kick)	PITT 14–0

On October 10, the Panthers and the West Virginia Mountaineers played for the fifty-seventh time. Pitt led the all-time series 40–15–1, but West Virginia had won 4 of the past 7. Gene Corum's squad was 2–1 for the season, having beaten Richmond (20–10) and the The Citadel (7–3) and losing to Rice (24–0). Pitt quarterback Fred Mazurek explained the rivalry: “Against everyone else they hardly look like a football team. But when they play us, all of a sudden they played like eleven all-Americans. They really want to beat us.”

37,179 fans braved the cold and windy conditions to see the Panthers even their record at 2–2 by defeating the Mountaineers 14–0. Pitt took the opening kick-off and drove 68 yards in 15 plays. The drive took eight minutes and was capped with a Fred Mazurek 1 yard quarterback sneak. Jim Jones kicked the extra point. but then missed two field goal attempts. The Panthers scored again in the second quarter on a 9 yard touchdown pass from Mazurek to Eric Crabtree. Pitt defensive back Joseph Pohl intercepted Allen McCune's pass and returned it to the Mountaineers 45-yard line. Pitt scored five plays later. Jones added the extra point and Pitt led 14–0. Defense dominated the second half.

The starting lineup for the game against West Virginia was Bill Howley (left end), Dennis Bernick (left tackle), Ray Popp (left guard), Paul Cercel (center), James Irwin (right guard), Al Keiser (right tackle), Mitch Zalnasky (right end), Fred Mazurek (quarterback), James Dodaro (left halfback), Eric Crabtree (right halfback) and Barry McKnight (fullback). Substitutes appearing in the game for Pitt were Brian Generalovich, Phil Dahar, Mike Rosborough, Jim Jones, Bob Guzinsky, Tom Raymond, Howard Heit, Joe Novogratz, Tom Qualey, Robert Sorochak, Dan Picciano, Marty Schottenheimer, Jock Beachler, Kenny Lucas, Joseph Pohl, Dale Stewart, Dewey Chester, Peter Billey, Bob Dyer and Jim Flanigan.

Statistics	WVU	PITT
First downs	9	17
Plays–yards	61–120	53–251
Rushes–yards	38–71	33–147
Passing yards	49	104
Passing: comp–att–int	6–23–3	8–20–1
Turnovers	6	2
Time of possession	na	na

Team	Category	Player	Statistics
WVU	Passing	Allen McCune	2/6, 21 yards, 2 ints
WVU	Rushing	Roger Blackwell	12 carries, 36 yards
WVU	Receiving	Milt Clegg	2 receptions, 24 yards
PITT	Passing	Fred Mazurek	5/13, 73 yards
PITT	Rushing	Barry McKnight	16 carries, 62 yards
PITT	Receiving	Eric Crabtree	3 reception, 45 yards

=== at Miami (FL) ===
Week 5: Pitt at Miami

Team	1	2	3	4	Total
Pitt	0	7	7	6	20
Miami	6	7	7	0	20

- Date: September 26, 1964
- Location: Miami Orange Bowl
  Miami, FL
- Game start: 8:00 p.m.
- Game attendance: 34,663
- Game weather: warm
- Referee: Johnny Cook

Scoring summary
1	MIAMI	Andy Sixkiller 71-yard punt return (run failed)	MIAMI 6–0
2	MIAMI	Bob Biletnikoff 6-yard run (Don Cifra kick)	MIAMI 13–0
2	PITT	Mike Rosborough 8-yard pass from Kenny Lucas (Jim Jones kick)	MIAMI 13–7
3	PITT	Barry McKnight 1-yard run (Jones kick)	PITT 14–13
3	MIAMI	Jack Sims 3-yard pass from Biletnikoff (Cifra kick)	MIAMI 20–14
4	PITT	Eric Crabtree 67-yard run (kick failed)	TIED 20–20

The fifth game of the season was against the Miami Hurricanes in the Orange Bowl. The Hurricanes were led by first year head coach Charlie Tate. He inherited 19 returning lettermen, but his squad was 0–3 for the season. Pitt led the all-time series 5–4.

The favored Panthers were lucky to escape the Orange Bowl with a 20–20 tie, as the game ended when Miami kicker Dan Cifra's field goal went wide right with 9 seconds left on the clock. Miami, who had scored 1 touchdown total in its three previous games, managed to score twice to take a 13–0 lead late in the first half. Halfback Andy Sixkiller returned a Pitt punt 67 yards for the initial touchdown. The snap was fumbled on the extra point and Miami led 6–0 at the end of the first quarter. Then Miami scored on an 8-play, 43-yard drive. Bob Beletnikoff ran 6 yards around left end for the touchdown and Cifra booted the extra point. With less than 5 minutes left in the first half, the Panthers second team, led by Kenny Lucas, completed a 13-play, 66-yard drive with an 8-yard touchdown pass to Mike Rosborough. Jim Jones kicked the extra point to cut the lead to 13–7. In the third quarter, the Panthers went ahead 14–13 on a 1-yard run by Barry McKnight and Jones placement to end a 67-yard drive. Miami immediately answered with a 10-play, 50-yard drive to retake the lead 20–14 on a 3-yard touchdown pass from Beletnikoff to Jack Sims and Cifra extra point. With less than 5 minutes remaining, Pitt gained possession on their own 13-yard line. Four plays moved the ball to the 33-yard line. On second down Eric Crabtree ran around end for a 67-yard touchdown run. Jones missed his first extra point of the season, and the Panthers went home 2–2–1.

The Pitt starting lineup for the game against Miami was Bill Howley (left end), Dennis Bernick (left tackle), Ray Popp (left guard), Paul Cercel (center), Robert Sorochak (right guard), Al Keiser (right tackle), Mitch Zalnasky (right end), Fred Mazurek (quarterback), James Dodaro (left halfback), Eric Crabtree (right halfback) and Jim Flanigan (fullback). Substitutes appearing in the game for Pitt were Brian Generalovich, Phil Dahar, Mike Rosborough, Jim Jones, Bob Guzinsky, Tom Raymond, Joe Novogratz, Bernie LaQuinta, James Irwin, Marty Schottenheimer, Jock Beachler, Barry McKnight, Peter Billey, Dale Stewart, Robert Dyer, Kenny Lucas and Joseph Pohl.

Statistics	PITT	MIAMI
First downs	13	11
Plays–yards	61–249	49–157
Rushes–yards	48–166	36–111
Passing yards	83	46
Passing: comp–att–int	9–13–1	4–13
Turnovers	3	0
Time of possession	na	na

Team	Category	Player	Statistics
PITT	Passing	Fred Mazurek	5/6, 51 yards
PITT	Rushing	Eric Crabtree	7 carries, 94 yards
PITT	Receiving	Mike Rosborough	4 receptions, 30 yards
MIAMI	Passing	Bob Beletnikoff	3/12, 27 yards, 1 int
MIAMI	Rushing	Bob Beletnikoff	21 carries, 51 yards
MIAMI	Receiving	Andy Sixkiller	1 reception, 19 yards

=== Navy ===
Week 6:Navy at Pitt

Team	1	2	3	4	Total
Navy	0	14	0	0	14
Pitt	14	0	0	0	14

- Date: October 24, 1964
- Location: Pitt Stadium
  Pittsburgh, PA
- Game start: 1:30 p.m.
- Game attendance: 46,656
- Game weather: sunny and cool
- Referee: Paul F. Bertha (ECAC)

Scoring summary
1	PITT	Barry McKnight 1-yard run (Jim Jones kick)	PITT 7–0
1	PITT	McKnight 2-yard run (Jones kick)	PITT 14–0
2	NAVY	Kip Paskewich 2-yard run (kick failed)	PITT 14–6
2	NAVY	Paskewich 1-yard run (Skip Orr pass from Roger Staubach)	TIED 14–14

On October 24, the Panthers played the Navy Midshipmen led by Coach Wayne Hardin and All-America quarterback Roger Staubach. Navy was 2–3 for the season, and was on a three game losing streak. Pitt led the all-time series 7–4–1, but Navy had won 3 of the past 5 games. Even though Staubach had an injured achilles, he played, while starting fullback Pat Donnelly did not play due to his injuries. The Panthers only loss in 1963 was to the Navy and captain Ray Popp stated: “This is one game we really want to win.”

On a beautiful fall day, in front of 46,656 fans the Panthers and Midshipmen played to a 14–14 tie. Pitt scored twice in the first quarter to take a 14–0 lead. Fullback Barry McKnight scored on a 1-yard run to cap a 90-yard opening drive. Minutes later, the Panthers gained possession on a fumbled punt at Navy's 3-yard line. McKnight scored his second touchdown on third down. Jim Jones booted both extra points. The second quarter was all Navy. Pitt back Dale Stewart fumbled a punt and Navy recovered on the Panthers' 13-yard line. Kip Paskewich scored from the 2, but Fred Martin missed the extra point wide-left. Navy regained possession on their 33-yard line and drove 67 yards to tie the score. Paskewich ran the final yard for the touchdown and Roger Staubach passed to Skip Orr for the two-point conversion. Pitt kicker Jim Jones missed field goal tries in the third and fourth quarter. Navy kicker Martin's 26-yard field goal attempt in the final period was blocked. Pitt was 2–2–2 for the season.

The Pitt starting lineup for the game against Navy was Brian Generalovich (left end), Dennis Bernick (left tackle), Ray Popp (left guard), Paul Percel (center), Robert Sorochak (right guard), Al Keiser (right tackle), Mitch Zalnasky (right end), Fred Mazurek (quarterback), Dale Stewart (left halfback), Eric Crabtree (right halfback) and Barry Mcknight (fullback). Substitutes appearing in the game for Pitt were Mike Rosborough, Phil Dahar, Jim Jones, Tom Raymond, Joe Novogratz, Thomas Qualey, Bernie LaQuinta, James Irwin, Marty Schottenheimer, Kenny Lucas, Joseph Pohl, James Dodaro, Robert Dyer and Jim Flanigan.

Statistics	NAVY	PITT
First downs	13	15
Plays–yards	60–144	62–270
Rushes–yards	40–30	47–180
Passing yards	114	90
Passing: comp–att–int	12–20	8–15–3
Turnovers	3	4
Time of possession	na	na

Team	Category	Player	Statistics
NAVY	Passing	Roger Staubach	12/20, 114 yards
NAVY	Rushing	Kip Paskewich	14 carries, 38 yards
NAVY	Receiving	Skip Orr	5 receptions, 40 yards
PITT	Passing	Fred Mazurek	5/10, 55 yards, 3 ints
PITT	Rushing	Eric Crabtree	12 carries, 72 yards
PITT	Receiving	Mitch Zalnasky	2 reception, 23 yards

=== at Syracuse ===
Week 7: Pitt at Syracuse

Team	1	2	3	4	Total
Pitt	0	6	0	0	6
• Syracuse	0	14	0	7	21

- Date: October 31, 1964
- Location: Archbold Stadium
  Syracuse, NY
- Game start: 1:30 p.m.
- Game attendance: 35,000
- Game weather: sunny and warm
- Referee: Francis P. Brennan (Canisius)

Scoring summary
2	PITT	Kenny Lucas 2-yard run (kick failed)	PITT 6–0
2	SYR	Floyd Little 7-yard run (Roger Smith kick)	SYR 7–6
2	SYR	Richard King 30-yard interception return (Smith kick)	SYR 14–6
4	SYR	Jim Nance 2-yard run (Smith kick)	SYR 21–6

Pitt's seventh game was against the Syracuse Orange at Archbold Stadium in Syracuse, NY. Coach Ben Schwartzwalder's squad had 22 returning lettermen, including All-America candidates Floyd Little and Jim Nance. They were 4–2 on the season. The Panthers led the all-time series 11–6–2, and were on a current 3-game win streak over the Orange.

In front of 35,000 of mostly Syracuse fans, the Panthers lost to the Orange by a score of 21–6. Pitt quarterback Kenny Lucas ran 2-yards for a touchdown to cap a 58-yard drive early in the second period. Jim Jones was wide left on the conversion attempt. Syracuse answered immediately with a 69-yard, 7-play drive. Floyd Little ran the final 7 yards untouched into the end zone. Roger Smith made the score 7–6 Syracuse. Three plays later, Syracuse defensive back Richard King intercepted an errant Lucas pass and ran 30 yards for the touchdown. Smith booted the extra point for a 14–6 halftime lead. In the fourth quarter, Jim Nance scored on a 2-yard run and Smith converted for the third time to ice the game. Little gained 100 yards on 15 carries, the Panthers total rushing yardage was 94 yards.

The Pitt starting lineup for the game against Syracuse was Mike Rosborough (left end), Dennis Bernick (left tackle), Ray Popp (left guard), Paul Cercal (center), Robert Sorochak (right guard), Al Keiser (right tackle), Mitch Zalnasky (right end), Fred Mazurek (quarterback), James Dodaro (left halfback), Eric Crabtree (right halfback) and Barry McKnight (fullback). Substitutes appearing in the game for Pitt were Brian Generalovich, Phil Dahar, James Jones, John Schmidt, Tom Qualey, Joe Novogratz, Marty Schottenheimer, Bernie LaQuinta, James Irwin, Bob Guzinsky, Fred Hoaglin, Kenny Lucas, Joseph Pohl, Dale Stewart, Peter Billey, Robert Dyer and Jim Flanigan.

Statistics	PITT	SYR
First downs	11	13
Plays–yards	57–143	58–187
Rushes–yards	44–94	47–151
Passing yards	49	36
Passing: comp–att–int	4–13–2	3–11
Turnovers	3	0
Time of possession	na	na

Team	Category	Player	Statistics
PITT	Passing	Fred Mazurek	2/7, 26 yards
PITT	Rushing	Barry McKnight	16 carries, 73 yards
PITT	Receiving	Eric Crabtree	1 receptions, 21 yards
SYR	Passing	Walley Mahle	3/11, 36 yards
SYR	Rushing	Floyd Little	15 carries, 100 yards
SYR	Receiving	Floyd Little	1 reception, 16 yards

=== Notre Dame ===
Week 8:Notre Dame at Pitt

Team	1	2	3	4	Total
• Notre Dame	14	3	0	0	17
Pitt	0	8	0	7	15

- Date: November 7, 1964
- Location: Pitt Stadium
  Pittsburgh, PA
- Game start: 1:30 p.m.
- Game attendance: 56,628
- Game weather: sunny and cool

Scoring summary
1	ND	Joe Farrell 1-yard run (Joe Azzaro kick)	ND 7–0
1	ND	Nick Eddy 91-yard pass from John Huarte (Azzaro kick)	ND 14–0
2	PITT	Barry McKnight 1-yard run (McKnight run)	ND 14–8
2	ND	Azzaro 29-yard field goal	ND 17–8
4	PITT	McKnight 1-yard run (Jim Jones kick)	ND 17–15

The Panthers Homecoming opponent was the Notre Dame Fighting Irish. After going 2–7 in 1963, the Irish hired Ara Parseghian and they arrived in Pittsburgh 6–0 and ranked number 1. The Irish roster included quarterback John Huarte (Heisman Trophy winner), and All-America candidates: end Jack Snow, defensive tackle Kevin Hardy, linebacker Jim Carroll and defensive back Toney Carey. Notre Dame led the all-time series 18–11–1, but Pitt had won 5 of the past 8 games.

In front of 56,628 Homecoming fans, the Panthers lost to the Irish 17–15. Notre Dame scored two touchdowns in the first quarter. They took the opening kick-off 80 yards with Joe Farrell scoring from the 1-yard line. The Irish defense forced a punt to regain possession on their own 7-yard line. On third down, John Huarte threw a 91-yard touchdown pass to Nick Eddy. Joe Azzaro kicked both extra points. The 91-yard touchdown pass was the longest in Pitt Stadium history at that point. In the second quarter, the Panthers' offense answered with a 31-yard drive made possible by Brian Generalovich's fumble recovery. Barry McKnight scored on a 1-yard plunge and then ran the 2 yards for the conversion. Notre dame retaliated with a short drive that ended with a Azzaro field goal to make the score 17–8 at halftime. In the final quarter, the Panthers drove 80 yards with McKnight scoring again on a 1-yard run. Jim Jones kicked the extra point to cut the lead to 2 points. Pitt regained possession and drove to the Notre Dame 17-yard line. On fourth down with 1 yard to go, Coach Michelosen opted to run the ball instead of kicking a field goal. Fred Mazurek's quarterback sneak was 1 foot short.

The starting lineup for the game against Notre Dame was Bill Howley (left end), James Jones (left tackle), Ray Popp (left guard), Paul Cercel (center), Bernard LaQuinta (right guard), Ronald Linaburg (right tackle), Mitch Zalnasky (right end), Fred Mazurek (quarterback), Dale Stewart (left halfback), Eric Crabtree (right halfback) and Barry McKnight (fullback). Substitutes appearing in the game for Pitt were Mike Rosborough, Brian Generalovich, Phil Dahar, Dennis Bernick, Al Keiser, Tom Raymond, Joe Novogratz, Robert Sorochak, James Irwin, Marty Schottenheimer, Kenny Lucas, Joseph Pohl, James Dodaro, Bill Bodle, Robert Dyer and Jim Flanigan.

Statistics	ND	PITT
First downs	17	12
Plays–yards	65–377	54–228
Rushes–yards	44–165	49–199
Passing yards	212	29
Passing: comp–att–int	9–21	3–5
Turnovers	2	3
Time of possession	na	na

Team	Category	Player	Statistics
ND	Passing	John Huarte	9/21, 212 yards
ND	Rushing	Joe Farrell	15 carries, 83 yards
ND	Receiving	Nick Eddy	3 receptions, 119 yards
PITT	Passing	Fred Mazurek	3/5, 29 yards
PITT	Rushing	Barry McKnight	21 carries, 93 yards
PITT	Receiving	Eric Crabtree	1 reception, 12 yards

=== at Army ===
Week 9: Pitt at Army

Team	1	2	3	4	Total
• Pitt	3	6	15	0	24
Army	0	0	0	8	8

- Date: November 14, 1964
- Location: Michie Stadium
  West Point, NY
- Game start: 2:00 p.m.
- Game attendance: 31,963
- Game weather: cool
- Referee: Robert W. Van Lengen (Princeton)

Scoring summary
1	PITT	Jim Jones 37-yard field goal	PITT 3–0
2	PITT	Barry McKnight 7-yard run (kick failed)	PITT 9–0
3	PITT	Eric Crabtree 30-yard pass from Fred Mazurek (Jim Jones kick)	PITT 16–0
3	PITT	Crabtree 2-yard run (Kenny Lucas run)	PITT 24–0
4	ARMY	Greg Steele 6-yard pass from Rollie Stichweh (Steele pass from Stichweh)	PITT 24–8

The Panthers fifth road trip was to West Point, NY to play the Army Cadets. Third-year Coach Paul Dietzel's squad was 3–5 for the season. The Panthers led the all-time series 7–2–2, and were on a 2-game win streak over the Cadets. Army's starting defensive back Sam Bartholomew did not play.

In front of a sellout crowd of 31,963, the Panthers easily beat the Army by a 24–8 margin for their third victory of the year. In the first period, after having 2 touchdowns called back on penalties, the Panthers got on the scoreboard via a Jim Jones 37-yard field goal. Three plays later, Army quarterback Rollie Stichweh threw an errant lateral that was recovered by Pitt lineman Bernie LaQuinta on the Army 40-yard line. On the second play Barry McKnight ran 7 yards for the touchdown. Jones missed the extra point. Pitt led at halftime 9–0. In the third quarter, halfback Eric Crabtree scored twice. First on a 30-yard pass from Fred Mazurek and then on a 2-yard run. Jones converted after the first, and Kenny Lucas ran after the second for 2 points. With less than 2 minutes left, Stichweh threw a 6-yard touchdown pass to Greg Steele, and then passed to Steele for the two-point conversion. Both quarterbacks set records. Stichweh broke the Army one season total offense record, and Mazurek moved into second place on the Pitt total offense chart.

The Pitt starting lineup for the game against Army was Mike Rosborough (left end), Dennis Bernick (left tackle), Ray Popp (left guard), Paul Cercel (center), Bernie LaQuinta (right guard), Ronald Linaburg (right tackle), Mitch Zalnasky (right end), Fred Mazurek (quarterback), Dale Stewart (left halfback), Eric Crabtree (right halfback) and Barry McKnight (fullback). Substitutes appearing in the game for Pitt were Brian Generalovich, Phil Dahar, James Eskridge, James Jones, Howard Heit, Bob Guzinsky, Al Keiser, Fred Hoaglin, Tom Raymond, Joe Novogratz, Ronald Cimino, Gabe Tamburino, Robert Sorochak, James Irwin, Marty Schottenheimer, Jock Beachler, Kenny Lucas, Joseph Pohl, Ed James, James Dodaro, Dewey Chester, Jim Flanigan, Carmen Sporio, Peter Billey, Robert Dyer and Bill Bodle.

Statistics	PITT	ARMY
First downs	18	11
Plays–yards	54–326	36–151
Rushes–yards	46–222	26–48
Passing yards	104	103
Passing: comp–att–int	7–8	8–10-1
Turnovers	1	3
Time of possession	na	na

Team	Category	Player	Statistics
PITT	Passing	Fred Mazurek	6/6, 96 yards
PITT	Rushing	Eric Crabtree	18 carries, 86 yards
PITT	Receiving	Eric Crabtree	2 receptions, 62 yards
ARMY	Passing	Rollie Stichweh	8/10, 103 yards, 1int
ARMY	Rushing	Rollie Stichweh	17 carries, 50 yards
ARMY	Receiving	Sam Champi	5 reception, 74 yards

=== at Penn State ===
Week 10: Pitt at Penn State

Team	1	2	3	4	Total
Pitt	0	0	0	0	0
• Penn State	7	13	0	8	28

- Date: November 21, 1964
- Location: Beaver Stadium
  University Park, PA
- Game start: 1:30 p.m.
- Game attendance: 50,170
- Game weather: brutally cold
- Referee: Gerald F. Hogan (Arkansas A. & M.)

Scoring summary
1	PSU	Tom Urbanic 1-yard run (Rich Gingrich kick	PSU 7–0
2	PSU	Urbanic 1-yard run (Gingrich kick)	PSU 14–0
2	PSU	Dirk Nye 5-yard run ( kick failed)	PSU 20–0
4	PSU	Dave McNaughton 1-yard run (Bill Huber pass from Gary Wydman)	PSU 28–0

Pitt's sixth road game of the season was to State College, PA to play the (5–4) Penn State Nittany Lions at Beaver Stadium. Coach Rip Engle's squad had 17 returning letterman including All-America guard Glenn Ressler. Pitt led the all-time series 34–26–3, but Penn State had won 4 of the past 6 games.

In front of a record crowd of 50,170 chilly fans, braving the 26 degree temperature and 30 mile per hour winds, Penn State dominated the Panthers 28–0. State scored three times in the first half for a 20–0. Fullback Tom Urbanic scored twice on 1-yard plunges. The first to cap the opening 56-yard drive, and the second to end a 69-yard drive. Richard Gingrich kicked the extra points. Late in the second period, halfback Dirk Nye capped a 59-yard drive with a 5-yard end run. Gingrich's kick missed. In the last quarter, the Lions completed an 89-yard drive with Dave McNaughton's 1-yard plunge. Gary Wydman passed to Bill Huber for the two-point conversion.

The starting lineup for the game against Penn State was Mike Rosborough (left end), Dennis Bernick (left tackle), Ray Popp (left guard), Paul Cercel (center), Robert Sorochak (right guard), Ron Linaburg (right tackle), Mitch Zalnasky (right end), Fred Mazurek (quarterback), James Dodaro (left halfback), Eric Crabtree (right halfback) and Barry McKnight (fullback). Substitutes appearing in the game for Pitt were Phil Dahar, Brian Generalovich, James Jones, Tom Raymond, Al Keiser, Joe Novogratz, Bernie LaQuinta, James Irwin, Marty Schottenheimer, Fred Hoaglin, Dale Stewart, Fred Dyer, Jim Flanigan, Joseph Pohl, Peter Billey, Bill Bodle and Kenny Lucas.

Statistics	PITT	PSU
First downs	8	23
Plays–yards	40–100	73–326
Rushes–yards	29–64	62–279
Passing yards	36	47
Passing: comp–att–int	6–11-1	4–11
Turnovers	2	0
Time of possession	na	na

Team	Category	Player	Statistics
PITT	Passing	Fred Mazurek	4/7, 30 yards, 1 int
PITT	Rushing	Barry McKnight	7 carries, 32 yards
PITT	Receiving	Mike Rosborough	3 receptions, 33 yards
PSU	Passing	Gary Wydman	3/9, 39 yards
PSU	Rushing	Tom Urbanic	20 carries, 107 yards
PSU	Receiving	Bob Riggle	3 reception, 39 yards

== Postseason ==
Marty Schottenheimer earned second team All-America recognition from the Associated Press and the Newspaper Enterprise Association.

Marty Schottenheimer and Paul Cercel were chosen to play for the North in the 1965 Senior Bowl Game in Mobile, Alabama on January 9. Schottenheimer was also chosen for the 1965 College All-Star Game played in Chicago, Illinois on August 6.

== Coaching staff ==
1964 Pittsburgh Panthers football staff
Coaching staff: John Michelosen – head coach; Carl DePasqua –defensive backs coach; Walter Cummins – center coach; Steve Petro – guard coach; Lou Cecconi – offensive backfield coach; Ernie Hefferle – end coach; Joe Pullekines – tackle coach; Bill Kaliden – freshman coach	Support staff: Frank Carver– athletic director; J. Clyde Barton – assistant athletic director; Walter Cummins – assistant athletic director; Carroll Cook– athletic publicity director; Dr. W. K. Smith – team doctor; Dr. Chester Phillips – team doctor; Dr.Richard Deitrick – team doctor; Howard Waite – trainer; Walter O. Willoughby – trainer; Frank Wiechec - trainer; Jack Dillon – student manager

== Roster ==
1964 Pittsburgh Panthers football roster
Player	Position	Games	Weight	Height	Class	Prep School	Hometown
Wayne Andersen	guard	1	200	6 ft	sophomore	William Penn H. S.	York, PA
Ed Assid	halfback	1	195	6 ft 3 in	junior	New Castle H. S.	New Castle, PA
Jock Beachler*	center	4	185	5 ft 11 in	junior	Mt. Lebanon H. S.	Mt. Lebanon, PA
William Beck*	fullback	1	185	5 ft 10 in	senior	Portage Area H. S.	Portage, PA
Dennis Bernick*	tackle	10	220	6 ft	senior	Hurst H. S.	United, PA
Peter Billey*	fullback	7	185	5 ft 9 in	senior	McKeesport H. S.	McKeesport, PA
Tom Black	quarterback	0	180	6 ft 1 in	junior	Washington Twp. H. S.	Apollo, PA
William Bodle*	halfback	5	195	6 ft	junior	Highland Park H. S.	Deerfield, IL
Brian Bubnis	guard	0	235	6 ft	sophomore	Mt. Carmel H. S.	Mt. Carmel, PA
Paul Cercel*	center	10	222	6 ft 2 in	senior	Austintown-Fitch H. S.	Youngstown, OH
Dewey Chester	halfback	4	205	6 ft 1 in	sophomore	East H. S.	Cleveland, OH
Ronald Cimino*	guard	2	199	5 ft 11 in	junior	Swissvale H. S.	Swissvale, PA
Frank Clark	halfback	0	185	5 ft 6 in	sophomore	Mohawk H. S.	Bessemer, PA
Eric Crabtree*	halfback	10	180	5 ft 11in	junior	Monessen H. S.	Monessen, PA
John Cullen*	guard	1	215	6 ft 1 in	senior	Munhall H. S.	Munhall, PA
Phil Dahar*	end	10	209	6 ft 2 in	junior	Dillonvale H. S.	Dillonvale, OH
James Dodaro*	halfback	10	200	6 ft 2 in	junior	North Catholic H. S.	Pittsburgh, PA
Robert Dyer*	halfback	8	175	5 ft 9 in	sophomore	Central Bucks H. S.	Doylestown, PA
James Elmore	halfback	1	180	6 ft	sophomore	Brentwood H. S.	Pittsburgh, PA
James Eskridge*	end	2	200	6 ft 1 in	junior	Rootstown H. S.	New Milford, OH
James Ferraco	halfback	0	175	6 ft 1 in	junior	Hampton Twp. H. S.	Allison Park, PA
James Flanagan*	fullback	10	220	6 ft 3 in	sophomore	West-Mifflin North	Duquesne, PA
Tom Furjanic	tackle	0	200	6 ft 3 in	junior	Bishop-McDevitt H. S.	Steelton, PA
Bill Galella	guard	0	215	6 ft 1 in	junior	West Scranton, Manlius H. S.	Scranton, PA
Brian Generalovich*	end	8	225	6 ft 4 in	senior	Farrell H. S.	Farrell, PA
Bob Guzinsky*	tackle	6	224	6 ft 2 in	junior	Mahonoy, Manlius H. S.	Mahonoy City, PA
Howard Heit	tackle	3	228	6 ft 3 in	sophomore	Kingston H. S.	Kingston, PA
Fred Hoaglin*	center	5	225	6 ft 4 in	junior	East Palestine H. S.	East Palestine, OH
William Howley*	end	6	205	6 ft 2 in	senior	Munhall H. S.	Munhall, PA
James Irwin*	guard	10	210	5 ft 11 in	senior	Taylor-Allderdice H. S.	Pittsburgh, PA
Edward James	quarterback	2	180	6 ft 1 in	sophomore	New Castle H. S.	New Castle, PA
James Jones*	tackle	9	265	6 ft 1 in	junior	Easton H. S.	Easton, PA
Al Keiser*	tackle	8	225	6 ft 2 in	sophomore	Bay H. S.	Bay Village, OH
Paul Kisiday	guard	0	210	6 ft 2 in	senior	Ambridge H. S.	Ambridge, PA
Bernard LaQuinta*	fullback	8	205	5 ft 10 in	senior	Mt. Lebanon H. S.	Mt. Lebanon, PA
Ronald Linaburg	tackle	5	225	6 ft 3 in	senior	Monongahela H. S.	Monongahela, PA
Kenny Lucas*	quarterback	10	180	6 ft	junior	Glassport H. S.	Glassport, PA
George Macko	tackle	2	235	6 ft 1 in	junior	Greensburg, Manlius H. S.	Greensburg, PA
Fred Mazurek*	quarterback	10	190	5 ft 10 in	senior	Redstone H. S.	Republic, PA
Barry McKnight*	fullback	10	204	6 ft	junior	Indiana H. S.	Indiana, PA
David Merrill	center	0	215	6 ft	sophomore	Allegheny H. S.	Cumberland, MD
Jake Mullett	halfback	1	185	6 ft 1 in	junior	Magnolia H. S.	North Martinsville, WV
Francis Novak*	quarterback	3	185	6 ft	senior	South Union H. S.	Uniontown, PA
Joe Novogratz*	guard	10	215	6 ft 2 in	junior	Northampton, Bordentown H. S.	Northampton, PA
Ken Perry	halfback	0	185	5 ft 11 in	junior	Monongahela H. S.	Finleyville, PA
Dan Picciano*	end	2	200	6 ft 1 in	senior	Jeannette H. S.	Jeanette, PA
Joseph Pohl*	quarterback	9	195	6 ft 1 in	sophomore	Erie East H. S.	Erie, PA
Ray Popp*	guard	10	223	6 ft 1 in	senior	Monongahela H. S.	Monongahela, PA
Thomas Qualey	guard	5	215	6 ft	sophomore	Braddock H. S.	Braddock, PA
David Randour	fullback	0	206	5 ft 10 in	sophomore	Fort Cherry H. S.	McDonald, PA
Tom Raymond*	tackle	8	235	6 ft 1 in	junior	Beth-Center H. S.	Centerville, PA
Michael Rosborough*	end	9	200	6 ft 3 in	sophomore	Donora H. S.	Donora, PA
John Schmidt	tackle	4	228	6 ft 2 in	sophomore	Baldwin H. S.	Pittsburgh, PA
Martin Schottenheimer*	center	10	225	6 ft 3 in	senior	Fort Cherry H. S.	McDonald, PA
Ronald Simantel*	end	1	225	6 ft 8 in	senior	New Kensington H. S.	New Kensington, PA
Stephen Sisak*	tackle	1	220	6 ft 2 in	senior	Laura Lamar H. S.	Graceton, PA
Peter Smith	quarterback	1	190	6 ft 1 in	sophomore	Uniontown H. S.	Uniontown, PA
Robert Sorochak*	guard	10	215	5 ft 10 in	senior	Kingston H. S.	Kingston, PA
Carmen Sporio	fullback	2	200	6 ft	junior	Thomas Jefferson H. S.	Clairton, PA
Dale Stewart*	halfback	9	205	6 ft 1 in	junior	Hazelton, Manlius H. S.	Hazelton, PA
Gabe Tamburino	center	2	230	6 ft 3 in	junior	Ursuline H. S.	Youngstown, OH
Robert Taylor	center	1	205	6 ft 2 in	sophomore	Ambridge H. S.	Ambridge, PA
Robert Trethaway	tackle	1	225	6 ft 4 in	sophomore	Meyers H. S.	Wilkes-Barre, PA
John Verkleeren	end	1	205	6 ft 3 in	junior	Charleroi H. S.	Charleroi, PA
Kurt Wentzel	end	1	215	6 ft 2 in	sophomore	Mt. Lebanon, Manlius H. S.	Mt. Lebanon, PA
Mitchell Zalnasky*	end	10	200	6 ft 2 in	junior	West Allegheny H. S.	Tyre, PA
* Letterman

== Individual scoring summary ==
1964 Pittsburgh Panthers scoring summary
Player	Touchdowns	Extra points	Two pointers	Field goals	Safety	Points
Barry McKnight	8	0	1	0	0	50
Eric Crabtree	5	0	0	0	0	30
Fred Mazurek	4	0	0	0	0	24
Kenny Lucas	2	0	1	0	0	14
James Jones	0	9	0	1	0	12
Robert Dyer	1	0	0	0	0	6
Bill Howley	1	0	0	0	0	6
Mike Rosborough	1	0	0	0	0	6
Howard Heit	0	4	0	0	0	4
Totals	22	13	2	1	0	152

== Statistical leaders ==
Pittsburgh's individual statistical leaders for the 1964 season include those listed below.

=== Rushing ===
Player	Attempts	Net yards	Yards per attempt	Touchdowns
Barry McKnight	129	551	4.3	7
Fred Mazurek	123	481	3.9	5
Eric Crabtree	75	344	4.6	3

=== Passing ===
Player	Attempts	Completions	Interceptions	Comp %	Yards	Yds/Comp	TD
Fred Mazurek	93	53	8	57.0	686	12.9	3
Ken Lucas	44	20	5	45.5	200	10.0	1

=== Receiving ===
Player	Receptions	Yards	Yds/Recp	TD
Eric Crabtree	14	255	18.2	2
Mitch Zalnasky	14	156	11.1	0
Mike Rosborough	16	151	9.4	1
James Dodaro	9	121	13.5	0

=== Kickoff returns ===
Player	Returns	Yards	Yds/Return	TD
Eric Crabtree	12	303	25.3	0
Fred Mazurek	7	173	24.7	0

=== Punt returns ===
Player	Returns	Yards	Yds/Return	TD
Eric Crabtree	17	130	7.6	0
Dale Stewart	3	22	7.3	0

== Team players drafted into the NFL ==
The following Panthers were chosen by NFL teams during their 1965 draft.

Player	Position	Round	Pick	NFL club
Marty Schottenheimer	Linebacker	4	49	Baltimore Colts
Bill Howley	End	8	102	Pittsburgh Steelers

== Team players drafted into the AFL ==
The following Panthers were chosen by AFL teams during their 1965 draft.

Player	Position	Round	Pick	AFL club
Marty Schottenheimer	Linebacker	7	56	Buffalo Bills
