= 1964 West Texas State Buffaloes football team =

American college football season

1964 West Texas State Buffaloes football
- Conference: Independent
- Record: 4–6
- Head coach: Joe Kerbel (5th season)
- Home stadium: Buffalo Bowl

1964 NCAA University Division independents football records
	Conf.			Overall
Team	W	L	T	W		L		T
No. 3 Notre Dame		–		9	–	1	–	0
Florida State		–		9	–	1	–	1
Colgate		–		7	–	2	–	0
Georgia Tech		–		7	–	3	–	0
Syracuse		–		7	–	4	–	0
Villanova		–		6	–	2	–	0
Boston College		–		6	–	3	–	0
Southern Miss		–		6	–	3	–	0
New Mexico State		–		6	–	4	–	0
Penn State		–		6	–	4	–	0
Memphis State		–		5	–	4	–	0
Utah State		–		5	–	4	–	1
Holy Cross		–		5	–	5	–	0
Buffalo		–		4	–	4	–	1
Colorado State		–		5	–	6	–	0
Air Force		–		4	–	5	–	1
Miami (FL)		–		4	–	5	–	1
Xavier		–		4	–	5	–	1
Army		–		4	–	6	–	0
West Texas State		–		4	–	6	–	0
San Jose State		–		4	–	6	–	0
Pittsburgh		–		3	–	5	–	2
Navy		–		3	–	6	–	1
Dayton		–		3	–	7	–	0
Detroit		–		3	–	7	–	0
Boston University		–		2	–	7	–	0
Houston		–		2	–	6	–	1
Texas Western		–		0	–	8	–	2
Rankings from AP Poll

The 1964 West Texas State Buffaloes football team represented West Texas State University (now known as West Texas A&M University) as an independent during the 1964 NCAA University Division football season. In their fifth season under head coach Joe Kerbel, the Buffaloes compiled an 4–6 record. West Texas State played home games at the Buffalo Bowl in Canyon, Texas.

== Schedule ==
Date	Opponent	Site	Result	Attendance	Source
September 19	Ohio	Buffalo Bowl; Canyon, TX	L 14–16		
September 26	Arizona State	Buffalo Bowl; Canyon, TX	L 8–34	11,027	
October 3	Texas Western	Buffalo Bowl; Canyon, TX	W 14–0	10,208	
October 10	at North Texas State	Fouts Field; Denton, TX	W 21–13	5,000	
October 17	Memphis State^{†}	Buffalo Bowl; Canyon, TX	L 0–41	12,426	
October 24	Trinity (TX)	Buffalo Bowl; Canyon, TX	W 21–6	3,000	
October 31	San Jose State	Buffalo Bowl; Canyon, TX	W 18–7	7,500	
November 7	at Texas Tech	Jones Stadium; Lubbock, TX	L 0–48	34,500	
November 14	at New Mexico State	Memorial Stadium; Las Cruces, NM	L 0–40		
November 21	at Arlington State	Memorial Stadium; Arlington, TX	L 16–20	2,000	
^{†}Homecoming
