= 1964 Air Force Falcons football team =

American college football season

1964 Air Force Falcons football
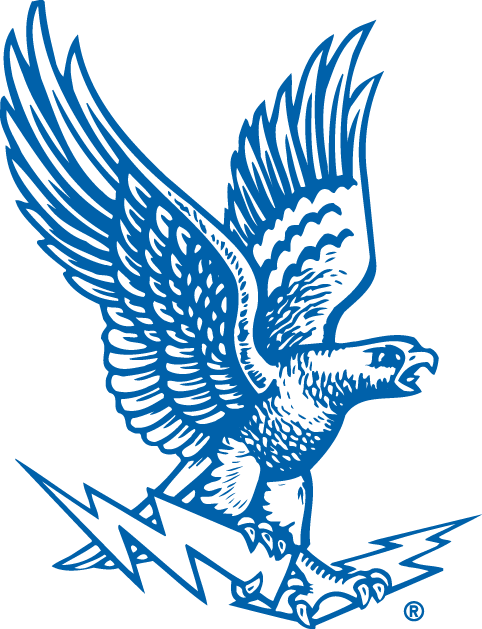
- Conference: Independent
- Record: 4–5–1
- Head coach: Ben Martin (7th season)
- Captains: Dick Czarnota; Wendell Harkleroad
- Home stadium: Falcon Stadium

1964 NCAA University Division independents football records
	Conf.			Overall
Team	W	L	T	W		L		T
No. 3 Notre Dame		–		9	–	1	–	0
Florida State		–		9	–	1	–	1
Colgate		–		7	–	2	–	0
Georgia Tech		–		7	–	3	–	0
Syracuse		–		7	–	4	–	0
Villanova		–		6	–	2	–	0
Boston College		–		6	–	3	–	0
Southern Miss		–		6	–	3	–	0
New Mexico State		–		6	–	4	–	0
Penn State		–		6	–	4	–	0
Memphis State		–		5	–	4	–	0
Utah State		–		5	–	4	–	1
Holy Cross		–		5	–	5	–	0
Buffalo		–		4	–	4	–	1
Colorado State		–		5	–	6	–	0
Air Force		–		4	–	5	–	1
Miami (FL)		–		4	–	5	–	1
Xavier		–		4	–	5	–	1
Army		–		4	–	6	–	0
West Texas State		–		4	–	6	–	0
San Jose State		–		4	–	6	–	0
Pittsburgh		–		3	–	5	–	2
Navy		–		3	–	6	–	1
Dayton		–		3	–	7	–	0
Detroit		–		3	–	7	–	0
Boston University		–		2	–	7	–	0
Houston		–		2	–	6	–	1
Texas Western		–		0	–	8	–	2
Rankings from AP Poll

The 1964 Air Force Falcons football team represented the United States Air Force Academy as an independent during the 1964 NCAA University Division football season. Led by seventh-year head coach Ben Martin, the Falcons compiled a record of 4–5–1 and were outscored by their opponents 146–106. Air Force played their home games at Falcon Stadium in Colorado Springs, Colorado.

== Schedule ==
Date	Opponent	Site	Result	Attendance	Source
September 19	at No. 7 Washington	Husky Stadium; Seattle, WA	W 3–2	56,000	
September 26	at Michigan	Michigan Stadium; Ann Arbor, MI	L 7–24	69,888	
October 3	Colorado State	Falcon Stadium; Colorado Springs, CO (rivalry)	W 14–6	25,681	
October 10	No. 6 Notre Dame	Falcon Stadium; Colorado Springs, CO (rivalry)	L 7–34	44,384	
October 17	Missouri	Falcon Stadium; Colorado Springs, CO	L 7–17	29,351	
October 24	at Boston College	Alumni Stadium; Chestnut Hill, MA	L 7–13	25,200	
October 31	Arizona	Falcon Stadium; Colorado Springs, CO	W 7–0	32,325	
November 7	at UCLA	Los Angeles Memorial Coliseum; Los Angeles, CA	W 24–15	24,888	
November 14	Wyoming	Falcon Stadium; Colorado Springs, CO	T 7–7	25,224–25,244	
November 21	at Colorado	Folsom Field; Boulder, CO	L 23–28	26,500	
Rankings from AP Poll released prior to the game; Source:
