= 1964 Miami Hurricanes football team =

American college football season

1964 Miami Hurricanes football
- Conference: Independent
- Record: 4–5–1
- Head coach: Charlie Tate (1st season)
- MVP: Robert J. Brown
- Home stadium: Miami Orange Bowl

1964 NCAA University Division independents football records
	Conf.			Overall
Team	W	L	T	W		L		T
No. 3 Notre Dame		–		9	–	1	–	0
Florida State		–		9	–	1	–	1
Colgate		–		7	–	2	–	0
Georgia Tech		–		7	–	3	–	0
Syracuse		–		7	–	4	–	0
Villanova		–		6	–	2	–	0
Boston College		–		6	–	3	–	0
Southern Miss		–		6	–	3	–	0
New Mexico State		–		6	–	4	–	0
Penn State		–		6	–	4	–	0
Memphis State		–		5	–	4	–	0
Utah State		–		5	–	4	–	1
Holy Cross		–		5	–	5	–	0
Buffalo		–		4	–	4	–	1
Colorado State		–		5	–	6	–	0
Air Force		–		4	–	5	–	1
Miami (FL)		–		4	–	5	–	1
Xavier		–		4	–	5	–	1
Army		–		4	–	6	–	0
West Texas State		–		4	–	6	–	0
San Jose State		–		4	–	6	–	0
Pittsburgh		–		3	–	5	–	2
Navy		–		3	–	6	–	1
Dayton		–		3	–	7	–	0
Detroit		–		3	–	7	–	0
Boston University		–		2	–	7	–	0
Houston		–		2	–	6	–	1
Texas Western		–		0	–	8	–	2
Rankings from AP Poll

The 1964 Miami Hurricanes football team represented the University of Miami as an independent during the 1964 NCAA University Division football season. Led by first-year head coach Charlie Tate, the Hurricanes played their home games at the Miami Orange Bowl in Miami, Florida. Miami finished the season 4–5–1.

== Schedule ==
Date	Opponent	Site	Result	Attendance	Source
September 19	Florida State	Miami Orange Bowl; Miami, FL (rivalry)	L 0–14	51,605	
September 26	at Georgia Tech	Grant Field; Atlanta, GA	L 0–20	44,115	
October 9	California	Miami Orange Bowl; Miami, FL	L 7–9	32,442	
October 17	Pittsburgh	Miami Orange Bowl; Miami, FL	T 20–20	34,663	
October 23	Indiana	Miami Orange Bowl; Miami, FL	L 14–28	33,567	
October 30	at Detroit	University of Detroit Stadium; Detroit, MI	W 10–7	15,180	
November 6	Tulane	Miami Orange Bowl; Miami, FL	W 21–0	33,855	
November 13	Boston College	Miami Orange Bowl; Miami, FL	W 30–6	32,180	
November 20	Vanderbilt	Miami Orange Bowl; Miami, FL	W 35–17	31,649	
November 28	at Florida	Florida Field; Gainesville, FL (rivalry)	L 10–12	31,118	

== Roster ==
- S Andy Sixkiller
