= 1964 Colorado State Rams football team =

American college football season

1964 Colorado State Rams football
- Conference: Independent
- Record: 5–6
- Head coach: Mike Lude (3rd season)
- Home stadium: Colorado Field

1964 NCAA University Division independents football records
	Conf.			Overall
Team	W	L	T	W		L		T
No. 3 Notre Dame		–		9	–	1	–	0
Florida State		–		9	–	1	–	1
Colgate		–		7	–	2	–	0
Georgia Tech		–		7	–	3	–	0
Syracuse		–		7	–	4	–	0
Villanova		–		6	–	2	–	0
Boston College		–		6	–	3	–	0
Southern Miss		–		6	–	3	–	0
New Mexico State		–		6	–	4	–	0
Penn State		–		6	–	4	–	0
Memphis State		–		5	–	4	–	0
Utah State		–		5	–	4	–	1
Holy Cross		–		5	–	5	–	0
Buffalo		–		4	–	4	–	1
Colorado State		–		5	–	6	–	0
Air Force		–		4	–	5	–	1
Miami (FL)		–		4	–	5	–	1
Xavier		–		4	–	5	–	1
Army		–		4	–	6	–	0
West Texas State		–		4	–	6	–	0
San Jose State		–		4	–	6	–	0
Pittsburgh		–		3	–	5	–	2
Navy		–		3	–	6	–	1
Dayton		–		3	–	7	–	0
Detroit		–		3	–	7	–	0
Boston University		–		2	–	7	–	0
Houston		–		2	–	6	–	1
Texas Western		–		0	–	8	–	2
Rankings from AP Poll

The 1964 Colorado State Rams football team represented Colorado State University as an independent during the 1964 NCAA University Division football season. In their third season under head coach Mike Lude, the Rams compiled a 5–6 record.

== Schedule ==
Date	Opponent	Site	Result	Attendance	Source
September 19	at Wyoming	War Memorial Stadium; Laramie, WY (rivalry)	L 7–31	17,014	
September 26	Pacific (CA)	Colorado Field; Fort Collins, CO	W 7–0	10,100	
October 3	at Air Force	Falcon Stadium; Colorado Springs, CO (rivalry)	L 6–14	25,681	
October 10	BYU	Colorado Field; Fort Collins, CO	W 7–6	7,500	
October 17	Utah^{†}	Colorado Field; Fort Collins, CO	L 3–13	11,200	
October 24	at Utah State	Romney Stadium; Logan, UT	L 13–42	12,565	
October 31	at Arizona State	Sun Devil Stadium; Tempe, AZ	L 6–34	26,753	
November 7	San Jose State	Colorado Field; Fort Collins, CO	W 14–3	7,500	
November 14	at New Mexico	University Stadium; Albuquerque, NM	L 0–42	24,732	
November 26	at Texas Western	Sun Bowl; El Paso, TX	W 38–8	5,934	
December 4	at Hawaii	Honolulu Stadium; Honolulu, HI	W 13–6	4,096	
^{†}Homecoming
