= 1964 New Mexico State Aggies football team =

American college football season

1964 New Mexico State Aggies football
- Conference: Independent
- Record: 6–4
- Head coach: Warren B. Woodson (7th season)
- Home stadium: Memorial Stadium

1964 NCAA University Division independents football records
	Conf.			Overall
Team	W	L	T	W		L		T
No. 3 Notre Dame		–		9	–	1	–	0
Florida State		–		9	–	1	–	1
Colgate		–		7	–	2	–	0
Georgia Tech		–		7	–	3	–	0
Syracuse		–		7	–	4	–	0
Villanova		–		6	–	2	–	0
Boston College		–		6	–	3	–	0
Southern Miss		–		6	–	3	–	0
New Mexico State		–		6	–	4	–	0
Penn State		–		6	–	4	–	0
Memphis State		–		5	–	4	–	0
Utah State		–		5	–	4	–	1
Holy Cross		–		5	–	5	–	0
Buffalo		–		4	–	4	–	1
Colorado State		–		5	–	6	–	0
Air Force		–		4	–	5	–	1
Miami (FL)		–		4	–	5	–	1
Xavier		–		4	–	5	–	1
Army		–		4	–	6	–	0
West Texas State		–		4	–	6	–	0
San Jose State		–		4	–	6	–	0
Pittsburgh		–		3	–	5	–	2
Navy		–		3	–	6	–	1
Dayton		–		3	–	7	–	0
Detroit		–		3	–	7	–	0
Boston University		–		2	–	7	–	0
Houston		–		2	–	6	–	1
Texas Western		–		0	–	8	–	2
Rankings from AP Poll

The 1964 New Mexico State Aggies football team represented New Mexico State University as an independent school during the 1964 NCAA University Division football season. In its seventh year under head coach Warren B. Woodson, the team compiled a 6–4 record and was outscored by a total of 171 to 131.

Woodson was later inducted into the College Football Hall of Fame.

== Schedule ==
Date	Opponent	Site	Result	Attendance	Source
September 19	Arlington State	Memorial Stadium; Las Cruces, NM	W 3–0	12,000	
September 26	at Utah State	Romney Stadium; Logan, UT	L 0–76	9,367	
October 3	at Florida State	Doak Campbell Stadium; Tallahassee, FL	L 0–36	> 25,000	
October 10	Trinity (TX)	Memorial Stadium; Las Cruces, NM	W 14–6	6,000	
October 17	at North Texas State	Fouts Field; Denton, TX	W 13–7	4,000	
October 24	at New Mexico	University Stadium; Albuquerque, NM (rivalry)	L 14–18	13,582	
October 31	at Eastern New Mexico	Portales, NM	W 20–0		
November 7	at Lamar Tech	Cardinal Stadium; Beaumont, TX	L 14–21	11,252	
November 14	West Texas State^{†}	Memorial Stadium; Las Cruces, NM	W 40–0		
November 21	Texas Western	Memorial Stadium; Las Cruces, NM (rivalry)	W 13–7	7,500	
^{†}Homecoming
