= 1964 Xavier Musketeers football team =

American college football season

1964 Xavier Musketeers football
- Conference: Independent
- Record: 4–5–1
- Head coach: Ed Biles (3rd season)
- Home stadium: Xavier Stadium

1964 NCAA University Division independents football records
	Conf.			Overall
Team	W	L	T	W		L		T
No. 3 Notre Dame		–		9	–	1	–	0
Florida State		–		9	–	1	–	1
Colgate		–		7	–	2	–	0
Georgia Tech		–		7	–	3	–	0
Syracuse		–		7	–	4	–	0
Villanova		–		6	–	2	–	0
Boston College		–		6	–	3	–	0
Southern Miss		–		6	–	3	–	0
New Mexico State		–		6	–	4	–	0
Penn State		–		6	–	4	–	0
Memphis State		–		5	–	4	–	0
Utah State		–		5	–	4	–	1
Holy Cross		–		5	–	5	–	0
Buffalo		–		4	–	4	–	1
Colorado State		–		5	–	6	–	0
Air Force		–		4	–	5	–	1
Miami (FL)		–		4	–	5	–	1
Xavier		–		4	–	5	–	1
Army		–		4	–	6	–	0
West Texas State		–		4	–	6	–	0
San Jose State		–		4	–	6	–	0
Pittsburgh		–		3	–	5	–	2
Navy		–		3	–	6	–	1
Dayton		–		3	–	7	–	0
Detroit		–		3	–	7	–	0
Boston University		–		2	–	7	–	0
Houston		–		2	–	6	–	1
Texas Western		–		0	–	8	–	2
Rankings from AP Poll

The 1964 Xavier Musketeers football team was an American football team that represented Xavier University as an independent during the 1964 NCAA University Division football season. In their third year under head coach Ed Biles, the Musketeers compiled a 4–5–1 record.

== Schedule ==
Date	Opponent	Site	Result	Attendance	Source
September 19	Miami (OH)	Xavier Stadium; Cincinnati, OH	T 7–7	14,165	
September 26	at Kent State	Memorial Stadium; Kent, OH	L 2–15	11,000–12,000	
October 3	Quantico Marines	Xavier Stadium; Cincinnati, OH	W 17–7	11,209	
October 10	at Cincinnati	Nippert Stadium; Cincinnati, OH (rivalry)	L 6–35	25,000	
October 17	at Ohio	Peden Stadium; Athens, OH	W 23–19	11,000	
October 24	Chattanooga	Xavier Stadium; Cincinnati, OH	L 14–27	8,356	
October 31	at Villanova	Villanova Stadium; Villanova, PA	L 13–31	12,000	
November 7	at Dayton	Baujan Field; Dayton, OH	W 12–7		
November 14	Detroit	Xavier Stadium; Cincinnati, OH	W 38–27	6,102	
November 21	Bowling Green	Xavier Stadium; Cincinnati, OH	L 7–35		
