= 1964 Boston University Terriers football team =

American college football season

1964 Boston University Terriers football
- Conference: Independent
- Record: 2–7
- Head coach: Warren Schmakel (1st season)
- Home stadium: Nickerson Field

1964 NCAA University Division independents football records
	Conf.			Overall
Team	W	L	T	W		L		T
No. 3 Notre Dame		–		9	–	1	–	0
Florida State		–		9	–	1	–	1
Colgate		–		7	–	2	–	0
Georgia Tech		–		7	–	3	–	0
Syracuse		–		7	–	4	–	0
Villanova		–		6	–	2	–	0
Boston College		–		6	–	3	–	0
Southern Miss		–		6	–	3	–	0
New Mexico State		–		6	–	4	–	0
Penn State		–		6	–	4	–	0
Memphis State		–		5	–	4	–	0
Utah State		–		5	–	4	–	1
Holy Cross		–		5	–	5	–	0
Buffalo		–		4	–	4	–	1
Colorado State		–		5	–	6	–	0
Air Force		–		4	–	5	–	1
Miami (FL)		–		4	–	5	–	1
Xavier		–		4	–	5	–	1
Army		–		4	–	6	–	0
West Texas State		–		4	–	6	–	0
San Jose State		–		4	–	6	–	0
Pittsburgh		–		3	–	5	–	2
Navy		–		3	–	6	–	1
Dayton		–		3	–	7	–	0
Detroit		–		3	–	7	–	0
Boston University		–		2	–	7	–	0
Houston		–		2	–	6	–	1
Texas Western		–		0	–	8	–	2
Rankings from AP Poll

The 1964 Boston University Terriers football team was an American football team that represented Boston University as an independent during the 1964 NCAA University Division football season. In its first season under head coach Warren Schmakel, the team compiled a 2–7 record and was outscored by a total of 213 to 77.

== Schedule ==
Date	Opponent	Site	Result	Attendance	Source
September 19	Buffalo	Nickerson Field; Boston, MA	L 0–35	6,600	
September 26	George Washington	Nickerson Field; Boston, MA	W 15–7	4,500	
October 3	at Dartmouth	Memorial Field; Hanover, NH	L 6–28	9,500	
October 10	Temple	Nickerson Field; Boston, MA	L 13–44	3,500	
October 24	at UMass	Alumni Field; Amherst, MA	L 7–28	10,800	
October 31	at Rutgers	Rutgers Stadium; Piscataway, NJ	L 0–9	14,000	
November 7	at Connecticut	Memorial Stadium; Storrs, CT	L 16–17	9,524	
November 14	Holy Cross	Nickerson Field; Boston, MA	L 0–32	7,000	
November 21	Rhode Island	Nickerson Field; Boston, MA	W 20–13	6,000	
