= 1964 Syracuse Orangemen football team =

American college football season

1964 Syracuse Orangemen football

Sugar Bowl, L 10–13 vs. LSU
- Conference: Independent

Ranking
- Coaches: No. 12
- Record: 7–4
- Head coach: Ben Schwartzwalder (16th season)
- Captains: Billy Hunter; Richard King
- Home stadium: Archbold Stadium

1964 NCAA University Division independents football records
	Conf.			Overall
Team	W	L	T	W		L		T
No. 3 Notre Dame		–		9	–	1	–	0
Florida State		–		9	–	1	–	1
Colgate		–		7	–	2	–	0
Georgia Tech		–		7	–	3	–	0
Syracuse		–		7	–	4	–	0
Villanova		–		6	–	2	–	0
Boston College		–		6	–	3	–	0
Southern Miss		–		6	–	3	–	0
New Mexico State		–		6	–	4	–	0
Penn State		–		6	–	4	–	0
Memphis State		–		5	–	4	–	0
Utah State		–		5	–	4	–	1
Holy Cross		–		5	–	5	–	0
Buffalo		–		4	–	4	–	1
Colorado State		–		5	–	6	–	0
Air Force		–		4	–	5	–	1
Miami (FL)		–		4	–	5	–	1
Xavier		–		4	–	5	–	1
Army		–		4	–	6	–	0
West Texas State		–		4	–	6	–	0
San Jose State		–		4	–	6	–	0
Pittsburgh		–		3	–	5	–	2
Navy		–		3	–	6	–	1
Dayton		–		3	–	7	–	0
Detroit		–		3	–	7	–	0
Boston University		–		2	–	7	–	0
Houston		–		2	–	6	–	1
Texas Western		–		0	–	8	–	2
Rankings from AP Poll

The 1964 Syracuse Orangemen football team represented Syracuse University as an independent during the 1964 NCAA University Division football season. The Orangemen were led by 16th-year head coach Ben Schwartzwalder and played their home games at Archbold Stadium in Syracuse, New York. Syracuse finished the regular season with a record of 7–3 and ranked 12th in the Coaches' Poll. They were invited to the Sugar Bowl, where they lost to LSU.

== Schedule ==
Date	Opponent	Rank	Site	TV	Result	Attendance	Source
September 19	at Boston College	No. 9	Alumni Stadium; Chestnut Hill, MA		L 14–21	25,800	
September 26	Kansas	No. 9	Archbold Stadium; Syracuse, NY		W 38–6	28,000	
October 3	at Holy Cross		Fitton Field; Worcester, MA		W 34–8	14,000	
October 10	UCLA		Archbold Stadium; Syracuse, NY		W 39–0	35,000	
October 17	at Penn State	No. 7	Beaver Stadium; University Park, PA (rivalry)		W 21–14	46,900	
October 24	at Oregon State	No. 8	Multnomah Stadium; Portland, OR		L 13–31	24,236	
October 31	Pittsburgh		Archbold Stadium; Syracuse, NY (rivalry)		W 21–6	35,000	
November 7	at Army		Yankee Stadium; Bronx, NY		W 27–15	37,552	
November 14	Virginia Tech		Archbold Stadium; Syracuse, NY		W 20–15	24,000	
November 21	at West Virginia	No. 9	Mountaineer Field; Morgantown, WV (rivalry)		L 27–28	14,000	
January 1	vs. No. 6 LSU		Tulane Stadium; New Orleans, LA (Sugar Bowl)	NBC	L 10–13	65,000	
Rankings from AP Poll released prior to the game; Source:
