= 1964 San Jose State Spartans football team =

American college football season

1964 San Jose State Spartans football
- Conference: Independent
- Record: 4–6
- Head coach: Bob Titchenal (8th season)
- Home stadium: Spartan Stadium

1964 NCAA University Division independents football records
| | Conf. | | | Overall |
| Team | W | L | T | W | | L | | T |
|---|---|---|---|---|---|---|---|---|
| No. 3 Notre Dame | | – | | 9 | – | 1 | – | 0 |
| Florida State | | – | | 9 | – | 1 | – | 1 |
| Colgate | | – | | 7 | – | 2 | – | 0 |
| Georgia Tech | | – | | 7 | – | 3 | – | 0 |
| Syracuse | | – | | 7 | – | 4 | – | 0 |
| Villanova | | – | | 6 | – | 2 | – | 0 |
| Boston College | | – | | 6 | – | 3 | – | 0 |
| Southern Miss | | – | | 6 | – | 3 | – | 0 |
| New Mexico State | | – | | 6 | – | 4 | – | 0 |
| Penn State | | – | | 6 | – | 4 | – | 0 |
| Memphis State | | – | | 5 | – | 4 | – | 0 |
| Utah State | | – | | 5 | – | 4 | – | 1 |
| Holy Cross | | – | | 5 | – | 5 | – | 0 |
| Buffalo | | – | | 4 | – | 4 | – | 1 |
| Colorado State | | – | | 5 | – | 6 | – | 0 |
| Air Force | | – | | 4 | – | 5 | – | 1 |
| Miami (FL) | | – | | 4 | – | 5 | – | 1 |
| Xavier | | – | | 4 | – | 5 | – | 1 |
| Army | | – | | 4 | – | 6 | – | 0 |
| West Texas State | | – | | 4 | – | 6 | – | 0 |
| San Jose State | | – | | 4 | – | 6 | – | 0 |
| Pittsburgh | | – | | 3 | – | 5 | – | 2 |
| Navy | | – | | 3 | – | 6 | – | 1 |
| Dayton | | – | | 3 | – | 7 | – | 0 |
| Detroit | | – | | 3 | – | 7 | – | 0 |
| Boston University | | – | | 2 | – | 7 | – | 0 |
| Houston | | – | | 2 | – | 6 | – | 1 |
| Texas Western | | – | | 0 | – | 8 | – | 2 |
Rankings from AP Poll

The 1964 San Jose State Spartans football team represented San Jose State College—now known as San Jose State University—as an independent during the 1964 NCAA University Division football season. Led by Bob Titchenal in his eighth and final season as head coach, the Spartans compiled a record of 4–6 and outscored opponents 151 to 145. The team played home games at Spartan Stadium in San Jose, California.

== Schedule ==
| Date | Opponent | Site | Result | Attendance | Source |
|---|---|---|---|---|---|
| September 19 | Idaho | Spartan Stadium; San Jose, CA | L 0–3 | 16,485–17,000 | |
| September 26 | at Stanford | Stanford Stadium; Stanford, CA (rivalry) | L 8–10 | 27,000 | |
| October 3 | at Montana State | Gatton Field; Bozeman, MT | W 20–14 | 5,500 | |
| October 17 | Washington State | Spartan Stadium; San Jose, CA | L 14–16 | 17,778 | |
| October 24 | at Pacific (CA) | Pacific Memorial Stadium; Stockton, CA (Victory Bell) | W 37–13 | 10,000 | |
| October 31 | at West Texas State | Buffalo Bowl; Canyon, TX | L 7–18 | 7,500 | |
| November 7 | at Colorado State | Colorado Field; Fort Collins, CO | L 3–14 | 7,500 | |
| November 14 | at Arizona State | Sun Devil Stadium; Tempe, AZ | L 16–28 | 21,477 | |
| November 21 | Fresno State | Spartan Stadium; San Jose, CA (rivalry) | W 26–14 | 15,214 | |
| November 28 | San Diego State | Spartan Stadium; San Jose, CA | W 20–15 | 7,154–7,500 | |

== Team players in the NFL ==
The following San Jose State players were selected in the 1965 NFL draft.

| Player | Position | Round | Overall | NFL team |
| Dave Johnson | End | 4 | 45 | Baltimore Colts |
| Bob Bonds | Halfback | 5 | 68 | St. Louis Cardinals |
| Brent Berry | Tackle | 13 | 177 | Los Angeles Rams |
