= 1964 Notre Dame Fighting Irish football team =

American college football season

1964 Notre Dame Fighting Irish football

National champion (NFF, Football News, Devold)
- Conference: Independent

Ranking
- Coaches: No. 3
- AP: No. 3
- Record: 9–1
- Head coach: Ara Parseghian (1st season)
- Captain: Jim Carroll
- Home stadium: Notre Dame Stadium

1964 NCAA University Division independents football records
	Conf.			Overall
Team	W	L	T	W		L		T
No. 3 Notre Dame		–		9	–	1	–	0
Florida State		–		9	–	1	–	1
Colgate		–		7	–	2	–	0
Georgia Tech		–		7	–	3	–	0
Syracuse		–		7	–	4	–	0
Villanova		–		6	–	2	–	0
Boston College		–		6	–	3	–	0
Southern Miss		–		6	–	3	–	0
New Mexico State		–		6	–	4	–	0
Penn State		–		6	–	4	–	0
Memphis State		–		5	–	4	–	0
Utah State		–		5	–	4	–	1
Holy Cross		–		5	–	5	–	0
Buffalo		–		4	–	4	–	1
Colorado State		–		5	–	6	–	0
Air Force		–		4	–	5	–	1
Miami (FL)		–		4	–	5	–	1
Xavier		–		4	–	5	–	1
Army		–		4	–	6	–	0
West Texas State		–		4	–	6	–	0
San Jose State		–		4	–	6	–	0
Pittsburgh		–		3	–	5	–	2
Navy		–		3	–	6	–	1
Dayton		–		3	–	7	–	0
Detroit		–		3	–	7	–	0
Boston University		–		2	–	7	–	0
Houston		–		2	–	6	–	1
Texas Western		–		0	–	8	–	2
Rankings from AP Poll

The 1964 Notre Dame Fighting Irish football team was an American football team that represented the University of Notre Dame as an independent during the 1964 NCAA University Division football season. In their first year under head coach Ara Parseghian, the Fighting Irish compiled a 9–1 record, outscored opponents by a total of 287 to 77, and were ranked No. 3 in the final AP and UPI polls. They won their first nine games and were ranked No. 1 in both polls before losing to unranked USC in the final game of the season.

Though Alabama was declared the national champion in both the final AP and UPI polls, and Arkansas received the honor from the Football Writers Association of America, Notre Dame was recognized as national champion by the National Football Foundation (NFF) and therefore received the MacArthur Bowl; the title, however, is not claimed by the university.

Notre Dame quarterback John Huarte tallied 2,062 passing yards, 16 passing touchdowns, and a 155.1 passer rating. He won the Heisman Trophy for 1964, finishing ahead of Jerry Rhome and Dick Butkus in the voting. Huarte and his favorite receiver, Jack Snow, were consensus first-team picks on the 1964 All-America college football team. Snow finished second nationally with 60 receptions for 1,114 yards. Bill Wolski led the team with 657 rushing yards and 66 points scored.

The team played its home games at Notre Dame Stadium in Notre Dame, Indiana.

== Schedule ==
Date	Opponent	Rank	Site	Result	Attendance	Source
September 26	at Wisconsin		Camp Randall Stadium; Madison, WI	W 31–7	64,398	
October 3	Purdue	No. 9	Notre Dame Stadium; Notre Dame, IN (rivalry)	W 34–15	59,611	
October 10	at Air Force	No. 6	Falcon Stadium; Colorado Springs, CO (rivalry)	W 34–7	44,384	
October 17	UCLA	No. 4	Notre Dame Stadium; Notre Dame, IN	W 24–0	58,335	
October 24	Stanford	No. 2	Notre Dame Stadium; Notre Dame, IN (rivalry)	W 28–6	56,721	
October 31	vs. Navy	No. 2	John F. Kennedy Stadium; Philadelphia, PA (rivalry)	W 40–0	66,752	
November 7	at Pittsburgh	No. 1	Pitt Stadium; Pittsburgh, PA (rivalry)	W 17–15	56,628	
November 14	Michigan State	No. 1	Notre Dame Stadium; Notre Dame, IN (rivalry)	W 34–7	59,265	
November 21	Iowa	No. 1	Notre Dame Stadium; South Bend, IN	W 28–0	59,135	
November 28	at USC	No. 1	Los Angeles Memorial Coliseum; Los Angeles, CA (rivalry)	L 17–20	83,840	
Rankings from AP Poll released prior to the game; Source:

== Game summaries ==
=== Wisconsin ===
Notre Dame Fighting Irish (0–0) at Wisconsin Badgers (0–0)

Quarter	1	2	3	4	Total
Notre Dame	3	10	0	18	31
Wisconsin	0	0	7	0	7

at Camp Randall Stadium • Madison, Wisconsin

- Date: September 26
- Game time: 1:30 pm CDT
- Game weather: Rain
- Game attendance: 64,398
- Notre Dame Football Archives

Game information

Notre Dame

- John Huarte
  15/24, 270 Yds, 2 TD
- Jack Snow
  9 Rec, 217 Yds, 2 TD

Wisconsin

In Ara Parseghian's coaching debut for Notre Dame, the players carried Parseghian off the field while the Irish fans in attendance chanted "We're number one" following the victory.

Scoring summary

Quarter	Time	Drive			Team	Scoring information	Score	
Quarter	Time	Plays	Yards	TOP	Team	Scoring information	ND	WIS
1	0:06				Notre Dame	31-yard field goal by Ken Ivan	3	0
2					Notre Dame	Jack Snow 61-yard touchdown reception from John Huarte, kick good	10	0
2	0:18				Notre Dame	-yard field goal by Ken Ivan	13	0
3					Wisconsin	Jimmy Jones 45-yard touchdown reception from Harold Brandt, kick good	13	7
4					Notre Dame	Joe Kantor -yard touchdown run, 2-point pass failed	19	7
4			45		Notre Dame	Bill Wolski 2-yard touchdown run, kick no good	25	7
4	3:12		87		Notre Dame	Jack Snow 42-yard touchdown reception from John Huarte, kick no good	31	7
"TOP" = time of possession. For other American football terms, see Glossary of American football.							31	7

=== Purdue ===
Team	1	2	3	4	Total
Purdue	7	0	0	8	15
• Notre Dame	0	14	7	13	34

- Date: October 3
- Location: Notre Dame Stadium, South Bend, IN
- Game start: 1:30 pm EST

Scoring summary
Q1	PU	Griese 1 yard run (Griese kick)	PU 0-7
Q2	ND	Snow 2 yard pass from Huarte (Ivan kick)	Tied 7-7
Q2	ND	Wolski 3 yard run (Ivan kick)	ND 14-7
Q3	ND	Page 57 yard return of blocked punt (Ivan kick)	ND 21-7
Q4	ND	Andreotti 23 yard run (Ivan kick)	ND 28-7
Q4	ND	Rassas 2 yard pass from Huarte (kick failed)	ND 34-7
Q4	PU	Hadrick 10 yard pass from Huarte (Hadrick pass from Griese)	ND 34-15

=== Air Force ===
Team	1	2	3	4	Total
• Notre Dame	7	7	7	13	34
Air Force	7	0	0	0	7

- Date: October 10
- Location: Falcon Stadium, Colorado Springs, CO
- Game start: 1:30 pm MST

Scoring summary
Q1	AF	Jarvis 25 yard interception return (Holiday kick)	AF 0-7
Q1	ND	Eddy 46 yard run (Ivan kick)	Tied 7-7
Q2	ND	Huarte 1 yard run (Ivan kick)	ND 14-7
Q3	ND	Wolski 20 pass from Huarte (Ivan kick)	ND 21-7
Q4	ND	Huarte 1 yard run (Ivan kick)	ND 28-7
Q4	ND	Snow 9 yard pass from Huarte (kick failed)	ND 34-7

=== UCLA ===
Team	1	2	3	4	Total
UCLA	0	0	0	0	0
• Notre Dame	6	6	12	0	24

- Date: October 17
- Location: Notre Dame Stadium, South Bend, IN
- Game start: 1:30 pm EST

Scoring summary
Q1	ND	Wolski 1 yard run (kick failed)	ND 6–0
Q2	ND	Sheridan 37 yard pass from Huarte (pass failed)	ND 12–0
Q3	ND	Snow 16 yard pass from Huarte (run failed)	ND 18–0
Q3	ND	Farrell 1 yard run (pass failed)	ND 24–0

=== Stanford ===
Team	1	2	3	4	Total
Stanford	0	0	0	6	6
• Notre Dame	0	15	7	6	28

- Date: October 24
- Location: Notre Dame Stadium, South Bend, IN
- Game start: 1:30 pm EST

Scoring summary
Q2	ND	Ivan 28 yard field goal	ND 3–0
Q2	ND	Wolski 54 yard pass from Huarte (kick failed)	ND 9–0
Q2	ND	Eddy 2 yard run (pass failed)	ND 15–0
Q3	ND	Wolski 1 yard run (Azzaro kick)	ND 22–0
Q4	ND	Wolski 9 yard run (run failed)	ND 28–0
Q4	SU	Lewis 3 yard pass from Handley (pass failed)	ND 28-6

=== Navy ===
Team	1	2	3	4	Total
• Notre Dame	0	21	7	12	40
Navy	0	0	0	0	0

- Date: October 31
- Location: John F. Kennedy Stadium, Philadelphia, PA
- Game start: 1:30 pm EST

Scoring summary
Q2	ND	Eddy 74 yard pass from Huarte (Azzaro kick)	ND 7-0
Q2	ND	Snow 55 yard pass from Huarte (Azzaro kick)	ND 14-0
Q2	ND	Wolski 1 yard run (Azzaro kick)	ND 21-0
Q3	ND	Farrell 1 yard run (Azzaro kick)	ND 28-0
Q4	ND	Snow 7 yard pass from Huarte (kick failed)	ND 34-0
Q4	ND	Conway 15 yard run (kick failed)	ND 40-0

=== Pittsburgh ===
Team	1	2	3	4	Total
• Notre Dame	14	3	0	0	17
Pittsburgh	0	8	0	7	15

- Date: November 7
- Location: Pitt Stadium, Pittsburgh, PA
- Game start: 1:30 pm EST

Scoring summary
Q1	ND	Farrell 1 yard run (Azzaro kick)	ND 7-0
Q1	ND	Eddy 91 yard pass from Huarte (Azzaro kick)	ND 14-0
Q2	Pitt	McKnight 2 yard run (McKnight run)	ND 14-8
Q2	ND	Azzaro 30 yard field goal	ND 17-8
Q4	Pitt	McKnight 1 yard run (Jones kick)	ND 17-15

=== Michigan State ===
Team	1	2	3	4	Total
Michigan St.	0	0	7	0	7
• Notre Dame	12	8	0	14	34

- Date: November 14
- Location: Notre Dame Stadium, South Bend, IN
- Game start: 1:30 pm EST
- Television network: NBC

Scoring summary
Q1	ND	Eddy 61 yard run (kick failed)	ND 6–0
Q1	ND	Farrell 13 yard pass from Huarte (run failed)	ND 12–0
Q2	ND	Eddy 5 yard run (Snow pass from Huarte)	ND 20-0
Q3	MSU	Washington 51 yard pass from Juday (Bobich kick)	ND 20-7
Q1	ND	Huarte 31 yard run (Eddy pass from Huarte)	ND 28-7
Q3	ND	Andreotti 1 yard run (pass failed)	ND 34-7

=== Iowa ===
Team	1	2	3	4	Total
Iowa	0	0	0	0	0
• Notre Dame	0	14	0	14	28

- Date: November 21
- Location: Notre Dame Stadium, South Bend, IN
- Game start: 1:30 pm EST
- Game weather: 13 degrees

Scoring summary
Q2	ND	Wolski 3 yard run (Ivan kick)	ND 7–0
Q2	ND	Snow 66 yard pass from Huarte (Ivan kick)	ND 14–0
Q4	ND	Eddy 7 yard run (Ivan kick)	ND 21–0
Q4	SU	Wolski 1 yard run (Ivan kick)	ND 28-0

=== USC ===
Team	1	2	3	4	Total
Notre Dame	3	14	0	0	17
• USC	0	0	7	13	20

- Date: November 28
- Location: Los Angeles Memorial Coliseum
- Game start: 1:30 pm PST
- Referee: Jack Sprenger

Scoring summary
Q2	ND	Ivan 25 yard field goal	ND 3-0
Q2	ND	Snow 21 yard pass from Huarte (Ivan kick)	ND 10-0
Q2	ND	Wolski 5 yard run (Ivan kick)	ND 17-0
Q3	USC	Garrett 1 yard run (Bronell kick)	ND 17-7
Q4	USC	Hill 23 yard pass from Fertig (kick failed)	ND 17-13
Q4	USC	Sherman 15 pass from Fertig (Bronell kick)	USC 17-20

== Personnel ==
1964 Notre Dame Fighting Irish football team roster
Players
Coaches
Offense

Pos.	#	Name	Class
HB		John Atamian	Sr
HB		Nick Eddy
QB	7	John Huarte	Sr
HB		Joe Kantor
E		Jack Snow	Sr
HB		Bill Wolski

Defense

Pos.	#	Name	Class
LB		Jim Carroll (C)	Sr
DB		Tony Carey
DB		Tom Longo
LB	61	Jim Lynch	So
DT		Alan Page	So
DB		Nick Rassas	Jr

Special teams

Pos.	#	Name	Class
K		Ken Ivan

Head coach

- Ara Parseghian

Coordinators/assistant coaches

- Tom Pagna (OC)
- John Ray (DL)
- Joe Yonto (OL)

Legend

- (C) Team captain
- (S) Suspended
- (I) Ineligible
- Injured
- Redshirt

== Awards and honors ==
- John Huarte, Heisman Trophy
