= 1964 Florida State Seminoles football team =

American college football season

1964 Florida State Seminoles football

Gator Bowl, W 36–19 vs. Oklahoma
- Conference: Independent

Ranking
- Coaches: No. 11
- Record: 9–1–1
- Head coach: Bill Peterson (5th season)
- Offensive coordinator: Bill Crutchfield (1st season)
- Offensive scheme: Pro set
- Defensive coordinator: Don James (3rd season)
- Base defense: 4–3
- Captains: William "Red" Dawson; Fred Biletnikoff; George D'Alessandro
- Home stadium: Doak Campbell Stadium

1964 NCAA University Division independents football records
	Conf.			Overall
Team	W	L	T	W		L		T
No. 3 Notre Dame		–		9	–	1	–	0
Florida State		–		9	–	1	–	1
Colgate		–		7	–	2	–	0
Georgia Tech		–		7	–	3	–	0
Syracuse		–		7	–	4	–	0
Villanova		–		6	–	2	–	0
Boston College		–		6	–	3	–	0
Southern Miss		–		6	–	3	–	0
New Mexico State		–		6	–	4	–	0
Penn State		–		6	–	4	–	0
Memphis State		–		5	–	4	–	0
Utah State		–		5	–	4	–	1
Holy Cross		–		5	–	5	–	0
Buffalo		–		4	–	4	–	1
Colorado State		–		5	–	6	–	0
Air Force		–		4	–	5	–	1
Miami (FL)		–		4	–	5	–	1
Xavier		–		4	–	5	–	1
Army		–		4	–	6	–	0
West Texas State		–		4	–	6	–	0
San Jose State		–		4	–	6	–	0
Pittsburgh		–		3	–	5	–	2
Navy		–		3	–	6	–	1
Dayton		–		3	–	7	–	0
Detroit		–		3	–	7	–	0
Boston University		–		2	–	7	–	0
Houston		–		2	–	6	–	1
Texas Western		–		0	–	8	–	2
Rankings from AP Poll

The 1964 Florida State Seminoles football team was an American football team that represented Florida State University as an independent during the 1964 NCAA University Division football season. In their fifth season under head coach Bill Peterson, the Seminoles compiled a 9–1–1 record, were ranked No. 11 in the final UPI Coaches Poll, defeated Oklahoma in the Gator Bowl, and outscored opponents by a total of 263 to 85.

After five losses and a tie in the first six games of the Florida–Florida State football rivalry, the Seminoles defeated Florida for the first time. The next day, the sports editor of The Tampa Tribune wrote: "Yesterday, on a technicolor afternoon of brisk wind and refreshing chill, in a stadium that maybe squeaked with an overload, FSU ceased to be the OTHER school, became the football team in this state in the year of 1964, will hereafter claim equal time in all things."

The team's statistical leaders included Steve Tensi with 1,986 passing yards, Phil Spooner with 682 rushing yards, and Fred Biletnikoff with 1,179 receiving yards and 90 points scored (15 touchdowns). Biletnikoff led the country in receiving yards and also with 100 receptions, and was a consensus first-team end on the 1964 All-America team.

== Schedule ==
Date	Opponent	Rank	Site	Result	Attendance	Source
September 19	at Miami (FL)		Miami Orange Bowl; Miami, FL (rivalry)	W 14–0	51,605	
September 26	at TCU		Amon G. Carter Stadium; Fort Worth, TX	W 10–0	18,167	
October 3	New Mexico State		Doak Campbell Stadium; Tallahassee, FL	W 36–0	> 25,000	
October 10	No. 5 Kentucky^{†}		Doak Campbell Stadium; Tallahassee, FL	W 48–6	34,248	
October 17	at Georgia	No. 10	Sanford Stadium; Athens, GA	W 17–14	31,000	
October 24	at Virginia Tech	No. 10	Lane Stadium; Blacksburg, VA	L 11–20	22,000	
October 31	Southern Miss		Doak Campbell Stadium; Tallahassee, FL	W 34–0	26,142	
November 7	at Houston		Rice Stadium; Houston, Texas	T 13–13	16,000	
November 14	NC State		Doak Campbell Stadium; Tallahassee, FL	W 28–6	24,250	
November 21	Florida		Doak Campbell Stadium; Tallahassee, FL (rivalry)	W 16–7	43,000	
January 2, 1965	vs. Oklahoma		Gator Bowl Stadium; Jacksonville, FL (Gator Bowl)	W 36–19	50,408	
^{†}Homecoming; Rankings from AP Poll released prior to the game

== Roster ==
- WR Fred Biletnikoff, Sr.
- QB Steve Tensi
- Phil Spooner

== Season summary ==
=== Miami (FL) ===
Team	1	2	3	4	Total
• Seminoles	7	7	0	0	14
Hurricanes	0	0	0	0	0

- Date: September 19
- Location: Orange Bowl
- Game attendance: 51,065

Scoring summary
Q1	2:03	FSU	Biletnikoff 15 yard pass from Tensi (Murdock kick)	FSU 7–0
Q2	0:46	FSU	Biletnikoff 16 yard pass from Tensi (Murdock kick)	FSU 14–0

- Fred Biletnikoff 9 Rec, 165 Yds

=== Florida ===
Team	1	2	3	4	Total
Gators	0	0	0	7	7
• Seminoles	0	7	3	6	16

- Date: November 21
- Location: Doak Campbell Stadium
- Game attendance: 43,000

Scoring summary
Q2	10:57	FSU	Biletnikoff 55 yard pass from Tensi (Murdock kick)	FSU 7–0
Q3	10:37	FSU	Murdock 24 yard field goal	FSU 10–0
Q4	12:03	FSU	Murdock 34 yard field goal	FSU 13–0
Q4	9:03	FLA	Harper 6 yard run (Hall kick)	FSU 13–7
Q4	6:42	FSU	Murdock 40 yard field goal	FSU 16–7

Florida State accepted the Gator Bowl bid following the victory.
