= 1964 Boston College Eagles football team =

American college football season

1964 Boston College Eagles football
- Conference: Independent
- Record: 6–3
- Head coach: Jim Miller (3rd season)
- Captain: Bill Cronin
- Home stadium: Alumni Stadium

1964 NCAA University Division independents football records
	Conf.			Overall
Team	W	L	T	W		L		T
No. 3 Notre Dame		–		9	–	1	–	0
Florida State		–		9	–	1	–	1
Colgate		–		7	–	2	–	0
Georgia Tech		–		7	–	3	–	0
Syracuse		–		7	–	4	–	0
Villanova		–		6	–	2	–	0
Boston College		–		6	–	3	–	0
Southern Miss		–		6	–	3	–	0
New Mexico State		–		6	–	4	–	0
Penn State		–		6	–	4	–	0
Memphis State		–		5	–	4	–	0
Utah State		–		5	–	4	–	1
Holy Cross		–		5	–	5	–	0
Buffalo		–		4	–	4	–	1
Colorado State		–		5	–	6	–	0
Air Force		–		4	–	5	–	1
Miami (FL)		–		4	–	5	–	1
Xavier		–		4	–	5	–	1
Army		–		4	–	6	–	0
West Texas State		–		4	–	6	–	0
San Jose State		–		4	–	6	–	0
Pittsburgh		–		3	–	5	–	2
Navy		–		3	–	6	–	1
Dayton		–		3	–	7	–	0
Detroit		–		3	–	7	–	0
Boston University		–		2	–	7	–	0
Houston		–		2	–	6	–	1
Texas Western		–		0	–	8	–	2
Rankings from AP Poll

The 1964 Boston College Eagles football team represented Boston College as an independent during the 1964 NCAA University Division football season. Led by third-year head coach Jim Miller, the Eagles compiled a record of 6–3. Boston College played home games at Alumni Stadium in Chestnut Hill, Massachusetts.

== Schedule ==
Date	Opponent	Site	Result	Attendance	Source
September 19	No. 9 Syracuse	Alumni Stadium; Chestnut Hill, MA	W 21–14	25,800	
September 26	at Army	Michie Stadium; West Point, NY	L 13–19	27,200	
October 10	at Tennessee	Neyland Stadium; Knoxville, TN	L 14–16	28,000	
October 17	Cincinnati	Alumni Stadium; Chestnut Hill, MA	W 10–0	15,000–17,700	
October 24	Air Force	Alumni Stadium; Chestnut Hill, MA	W 13–7	25,200	
November 7	at Villanova	Villanova Stadium; Villanova, PA	W 8–7	13,500	
November 13	at Miami (FL)	Miami Orange Bowl; Miami, FL	L 6–30	32,180	
November 21	Detroit	Alumni Stadium; Chestnut Hill, MA	W 17–9	25,100	
November 28	Holy Cross	Alumni Stadium; Chestnut Hill, MA (rivalry)	W 10–8	26,909	
Rankings from AP Poll released prior to the game; Source:
