= 1964 Memphis State Tigers football team =

American college football season

1964 Memphis State Tigers football
- Conference: Independent
- Record: 5–4
- Head coach: Billy J. Murphy (7th season)
- Captains: Chuck Brooks; Bob Finnamore
- Home stadium: Crump Stadium

1964 NCAA University Division independents football records
	Conf.			Overall
Team	W	L	T	W		L		T
No. 3 Notre Dame		–		9	–	1	–	0
Florida State		–		9	–	1	–	1
Colgate		–		7	–	2	–	0
Georgia Tech		–		7	–	3	–	0
Syracuse		–		7	–	4	–	0
Villanova		–		6	–	2	–	0
Boston College		–		6	–	3	–	0
Southern Miss		–		6	–	3	–	0
New Mexico State		–		6	–	4	–	0
Penn State		–		6	–	4	–	0
Memphis State		–		5	–	4	–	0
Utah State		–		5	–	4	–	1
Holy Cross		–		5	–	5	–	0
Buffalo		–		4	–	4	–	1
Colorado State		–		5	–	6	–	0
Air Force		–		4	–	5	–	1
Miami (FL)		–		4	–	5	–	1
Xavier		–		4	–	5	–	1
Army		–		4	–	6	–	0
West Texas State		–		4	–	6	–	0
San Jose State		–		4	–	6	–	0
Pittsburgh		–		3	–	5	–	2
Navy		–		3	–	6	–	1
Dayton		–		3	–	7	–	0
Detroit		–		3	–	7	–	0
Boston University		–		2	–	7	–	0
Houston		–		2	–	6	–	1
Texas Western		–		0	–	8	–	2
Rankings from AP Poll

The 1964 Memphis State Tigers football team represented Memphis State College (now known as the University of Memphis) as an independent during the 1964 NCAA University Division football season. In its seventh season under head coach Billy J. Murphy, the team compiled a 5–4 record and outscored opponents by a total of 173 to 103. Chuck Brooks and Bob Finnamore were the team captains. The team played its home games at Crump Stadium in Memphis, Tennessee.

The team's statistical leaders included Billy Fletcher with 921 passing yards and 367 rushing yards, Ray Farmer with 222 receiving yards, and John Wallace Wright with 24 points scored.

== Schedule ==
Date	Opponent	Site	Result	Attendance	Source
September 19	at No. 1 Ole Miss	Hemingway Stadium; Oxford, MS (rivalry)	L 0–30	35,000	
October 3	at Tampa	Phillips Field; Tampa, FL	W 13–0	9,000	
October 10	Southern Miss^{†}	Crump Stadium; Memphis, TN (rivlary)	L 14–20	18,005–18,500	
October 17	at West Texas State	Buffalo Bowl; Canyon, TX	W 41–0	12,426	
October 24	McNeese State	Crump Stadium; Memphis, TN	W 23–0	11,542	
October 31	Wake Forest	Crump Stadium; Memphis, TN	W 23–14	14,187	
November 7	at Tulsa	Skelly Stadium; Tulsa, OK	L 7–19	13,692	
November 14	Louisville^{†}	Crump Stadium; Memphis, TN (rivalry)	W 34–0	11,698	
November 21	at Southern Miss	Mississippi Veterans Memorial Stadium; Jackson, MS	L 18–20	9,000	
^{†}Homecoming; Rankings from AP Poll released prior to the game; Source:
