= 1964 Georgia Tech Yellow Jackets football team =

American college football season

1964 Georgia Tech Yellow Jackets football
- Conference: Independent
- Record: 7–3
- Head coach: Bobby Dodd (20th season)
- Captains: Bill Curry; Johnny Gresham
- Home stadium: Grant Field

1964 NCAA University Division independents football records
	Conf.			Overall
Team	W	L	T	W		L		T
No. 3 Notre Dame		–		9	–	1	–	0
Florida State		–		9	–	1	–	1
Colgate		–		7	–	2	–	0
Georgia Tech		–		7	–	3	–	0
Syracuse		–		7	–	4	–	0
Villanova		–		6	–	2	–	0
Boston College		–		6	–	3	–	0
Southern Miss		–		6	–	3	–	0
New Mexico State		–		6	–	4	–	0
Penn State		–		6	–	4	–	0
Memphis State		–		5	–	4	–	0
Utah State		–		5	–	4	–	1
Holy Cross		–		5	–	5	–	0
Buffalo		–		4	–	4	–	1
Colorado State		–		5	–	6	–	0
Air Force		–		4	–	5	–	1
Miami (FL)		–		4	–	5	–	1
Xavier		–		4	–	5	–	1
Army		–		4	–	6	–	0
West Texas State		–		4	–	6	–	0
San Jose State		–		4	–	6	–	0
Pittsburgh		–		3	–	5	–	2
Navy		–		3	–	6	–	1
Dayton		–		3	–	7	–	0
Detroit		–		3	–	7	–	0
Boston University		–		2	–	7	–	0
Houston		–		2	–	6	–	1
Texas Western		–		0	–	8	–	2
Rankings from AP Poll

The 1964 Georgia Tech Yellow Jackets football team represented the Georgia Institute of Technology as an independent during the 1964 NCAA University Division football season. The Yellow Jackets were led by 20th-year head coach Bobby Dodd, and played their home games at Grant Field in Atlanta. They competed as independents for the first time since 1920, after dropping from the Southeastern Conference in 1963.

== Schedule ==
Date	Opponent	Rank	Site	Result	Attendance	Source
September 19	Vanderbilt		Grant Field; Atlanta, GA (rivalry)	W 14–2	44,288	
September 26	Miami (FL)		Grant Field; Atlanta, GA	W 20–0	44,115	
October 3	Clemson		Grant Field; Atlanta, GA (rivalry)	W 14–7	46,571	
October 9	vs. Navy		Gator Bowl Stadium; Jacksonville, FL	W 17–0	40,000	
October 17	at Auburn		Legion Field; Birmingham, AL (rivalry)	W 7–3	57,000	
October 24	Tulane^{†}		Grant Field; Atlanta, GA	W 7–6	45,129	
October 31	at Duke	No. 8	Duke Stadium; Durham, NC	W 21–8	45,000	
November 7	Tennessee	No. 7	Grant Field; Atlanta, GA (rivalry)	L 14–22	50,763	
November 14	No. 2 Alabama	No. 10	Grant Field; Atlanta, GA (rivalry)	L 7–24	53,505	
November 28	at Georgia		Sanford Stadium; Athens, GA (Clean, Old-Fashioned Hate)	L 0–7	52,000	
^{†}Homecoming; Rankings from AP Poll released prior to the game
