= 1964 Buffalo Bulls football team =

American college football season

1964 Buffalo Bulls football
- Conference: Independent
- Record: 4–4–1
- Head coach: Dick Offenhamer (10th season)
- Captain: Gerry Pawloski
- Home stadium: Rotary Field

1964 NCAA University Division independents football records
	Conf.			Overall
Team	W	L	T	W		L		T
No. 3 Notre Dame		–		9	–	1	–	0
Florida State		–		9	–	1	–	1
Colgate		–		7	–	2	–	0
Georgia Tech		–		7	–	3	–	0
Syracuse		–		7	–	4	–	0
Villanova		–		6	–	2	–	0
Boston College		–		6	–	3	–	0
Southern Miss		–		6	–	3	–	0
New Mexico State		–		6	–	4	–	0
Penn State		–		6	–	4	–	0
Memphis State		–		5	–	4	–	0
Utah State		–		5	–	4	–	1
Holy Cross		–		5	–	5	–	0
Buffalo		–		4	–	4	–	1
Colorado State		–		5	–	6	–	0
Air Force		–		4	–	5	–	1
Miami (FL)		–		4	–	5	–	1
Xavier		–		4	–	5	–	1
Army		–		4	–	6	–	0
West Texas State		–		4	–	6	–	0
San Jose State		–		4	–	6	–	0
Pittsburgh		–		3	–	5	–	2
Navy		–		3	–	6	–	1
Dayton		–		3	–	7	–	0
Detroit		–		3	–	7	–	0
Boston University		–		2	–	7	–	0
Houston		–		2	–	6	–	1
Texas Western		–		0	–	8	–	2
Rankings from AP Poll

The 1964 Buffalo Bulls football team represented the University at Buffalo as an independent during the 1964 NCAA University Division football season. Led by tenth-year head coach Dick Offenhamer, the Bulls compiled a record of 4–4–1. The team's offense scored 177 points while the defense allowed 97 points. Buffalo played home games at Rotary Field in Buffalo, New York.

== Schedule ==
Date	Opponent	Site	Result	Attendance	Source
September 19	at Boston University	Nickerson Field; Boston, MA	W 35–0	6,600	
September 26	at Cornell	Schoellkopf Field; Ithaca, NY	T 9–9	17,000	
October 3	UMass	Rotary Field; Buffalo, NY (rivalry)	L 22–24	9,700–9,754	
October 10	at Marshall	Fairfield Stadium; Huntington, WV	L 12–14	8,000	
October 17	VMI	War Memorial Stadium; Buffalo, NY	W 14–10	21,000	
October 24	Holy Cross	Rotary Field; Buffalo, NY	L 14–20	8,136	
October 31	Delaware	Rotary Field; Buffalo, NY	W 37–0	8,200–8,253	
November 7	Richmond	Rotary Field; Buffalo, NY	W 28–13	8,007	
November 14	Colgate	Rotary Field; Buffalo, NY	L 6–7	8,635	
