= 1964 Penn State Nittany Lions football team =

American college football season

1964 Penn State Nittany Lions football

Eastern champion
- Conference: Independent

Ranking
- Coaches: No. 14
- Record: 6–4
- Head coach: Rip Engle (15th season)
- Captain: Bill Bowes
- Home stadium: Beaver Stadium

1964 NCAA University Division independents football records
	Conf.			Overall
Team	W	L	T	W		L		T
No. 3 Notre Dame		–		9	–	1	–	0
Florida State		–		9	–	1	–	1
Colgate		–		7	–	2	–	0
Georgia Tech		–		7	–	3	–	0
Syracuse		–		7	–	4	–	0
Villanova		–		6	–	2	–	0
Boston College		–		6	–	3	–	0
Southern Miss		–		6	–	3	–	0
New Mexico State		–		6	–	4	–	0
Penn State		–		6	–	4	–	0
Memphis State		–		5	–	4	–	0
Utah State		–		5	–	4	–	1
Holy Cross		–		5	–	5	–	0
Buffalo		–		4	–	4	–	1
Colorado State		–		5	–	6	–	0
Air Force		–		4	–	5	–	1
Miami (FL)		–		4	–	5	–	1
Xavier		–		4	–	5	–	1
Army		–		4	–	6	–	0
West Texas State		–		4	–	6	–	0
San Jose State		–		4	–	6	–	0
Pittsburgh		–		3	–	5	–	2
Navy		–		3	–	6	–	1
Dayton		–		3	–	7	–	0
Detroit		–		3	–	7	–	0
Boston University		–		2	–	7	–	0
Houston		–		2	–	6	–	1
Texas Western		–		0	–	8	–	2
Rankings from AP Poll

The 1964 Penn State Nittany Lions football team represented the Pennsylvania State University as an independent during the 1964 NCAA University Division football season. The team was coached by Rip Engle and played its home games in Beaver Stadium in University Park, Pennsylvania.

The team started the season poorly, giving up more than 20 points in each of four losses in their first five games before coming together defensively in the second half of the season. A total of just 24 points were given up in the final five games, helping the Nittany Lions to win out and finish the year with a winning record.

Particularly notable for the Nittany Lions in 1964 would be a 27–0 upset shutout of #2 ranked Ohio State at Columbus.

Penn State lineman Glenn Ressler, a particularly stout defender who would go on to have a 10-year career in the National Football League, would receive the Maxwell Award as college football's best all-around player of 1964.

Penn State's strong play down the stretch against top-level competition was sufficient to secure for it the 1964 Lambert Trophy, awarded annually to the top collegiate football team in the East despite the school's 6–4 season record.

== Schedule ==
Date	Time	Opponent	Site	Result	Attendance	Source
September 19		No. 10 Navy	Beaver Stadium; University Park, PA	L 8–21	44,648	
September 26		at UCLA	Los Angeles Memorial Coliseum; Los Angeles, CA	L 14–21	34,636	
October 3		Oregon	Beaver Stadium; University Park, PA	L 14–22	44,803	
October 10		at Army	Michie Stadium; West Point, NY	W 6–2	32,268	
October 17		No. 7 Syracuse^{†}	Beaver Stadium; University Park, PA (rivalry)	L 14–21	46,900	
October 24		at West Virginia	Mountaineer Field; Morgantown, WV (rivalry)	W 37–8	26,000	
October 31		Maryland	Beaver Stadium; University Park, PA (rivalry)	W 17–9	33,500	
November 7		at No. 2 Ohio State	Ohio Stadium; Columbus, OH (rivalry)	W 27–0	84,279	
November 14	9:00 p.m.	at Houston	Rice Stadium; Houston, TX	W 24–7	25,000	
November 21		Pittsburgh	Beaver Stadium; University Park, PA (rivalry)	W 28–0	50,170	
^{†}Homecoming; Rankings from AP Poll released prior to the game; All times are in Eastern time; Source:
