= 1964 Detroit Titans football team =

American college football season

1964 Detroit Titans football
- Conference: Independent
- Record: 3–7
- Head coach: John Idzik (3rd season)
- Captain: Fred Beier
- Home stadium: University of Detroit Stadium

1964 NCAA University Division independents football records
	Conf.			Overall
Team	W	L	T	W		L		T
No. 3 Notre Dame		–		9	–	1	–	0
Florida State		–		9	–	1	–	1
Colgate		–		7	–	2	–	0
Georgia Tech		–		7	–	3	–	0
Syracuse		–		7	–	4	–	0
Villanova		–		6	–	2	–	0
Boston College		–		6	–	3	–	0
Southern Miss		–		6	–	3	–	0
New Mexico State		–		6	–	4	–	0
Penn State		–		6	–	4	–	0
Memphis State		–		5	–	4	–	0
Utah State		–		5	–	4	–	1
Holy Cross		–		5	–	5	–	0
Buffalo		–		4	–	4	–	1
Colorado State		–		5	–	6	–	0
Air Force		–		4	–	5	–	1
Miami (FL)		–		4	–	5	–	1
Xavier		–		4	–	5	–	1
Army		–		4	–	6	–	0
West Texas State		–		4	–	6	–	0
San Jose State		–		4	–	6	–	0
Pittsburgh		–		3	–	5	–	2
Navy		–		3	–	6	–	1
Dayton		–		3	–	7	–	0
Detroit		–		3	–	7	–	0
Boston University		–		2	–	7	–	0
Houston		–		2	–	6	–	1
Texas Western		–		0	–	8	–	2
Rankings from AP Poll

The 1964 Detroit Titans football team represented the University of Detroit as an independent during the 1964 NCAA University Division football season. In their third and final season under head coach John Idzik, the Titans played their home games on campus at University of Detroit Stadium, finished 3–7, and were outscored 158 to 127.

Basketball head coach Bob Calihan was named the school's athletic director in September 1964. The football team's assistant coaches were Joe Clark, Dave Nusz, and Tony Hanley. Fullback Fred Beier was the team captain.

== Discontinuance of football program ==
On November 30, nine days after the season ended with a road loss at Boston College, the university announced that the football program was being discontinued. The university's president, the Very Rev. Laurence V. Britt, SJ, noted that the football program had not made a profit since 1951, had operated at a deficit for years, and had lost $65,000 in 1964 – a figure critics said was a bookkeeping device attempting to estimate the loss of tuition from players receiving football scholarships. With limited resources and mounting academic costs, Father Britt stated that the university could not subsidize the program at the level demanded by alumni and students. The decision stunned players and angered alumni. A protest by students included the removal of the stadium's goalposts.

== Schedule ==
Date	Opponent	Site	Result	Attendance	Source
September 19	at Kentucky	McLean Stadium; Lexington, KY	L 6–13	34,000	
September 25	Toledo	University of Detroit Stadium; Detroit, MI	W 22–6	10,181	
October 2	Cincinnati	University of Detroit Stadium; Detroit, MI	L 0–19	16,539	
October 10	at Villanova	Villanova Stadium; Philadelphia PA	L 0–34	12,700	
October 17	at Wichita State	Veterans Field; Wichita, KS	L 7–8	10,960	
October 23	Dayton	University of Detroit Stadium; Detroit	W 21–6	12,050	
October 30	Miami (FL)	University of Detroit Stadium; Detroit, MI	L 7–10	15,180	
November 6	VMI	University of Detroit Stadium; Detroit, MI	W 28–7	8,373	
November 14	at Xavier	Xavier Stadium; Cincinnati, OH	L 27–38	6,102	
November 21	at Boston College	Alumni Stadium; Chestnut Hill, MA	L 9–17	25,100	

== Players ==
- Dennis Assenmacher, halfback
- Fred Beier, fullback/defensive back and captain
- Tom Beer, end/guard
- Ron Bishop, quarterback
- Joe D'Angelo, halfback
- Jerry Dudley, guard
- John Everly, end
- Dennis Hackett, fullback
- Mike Haggerty, tackle
- Mike Randall, halfback
- Tony Richardson, end
- Tony Rossi, center
- Tom Siedlaczek, halfback
- Dick Waring, quarterback
