= 1964 Army Cadets football team =

American college football season

1964 Army Cadets football
- Conference: Independent
- Record: 4–6
- Head coach: Paul Dietzel (3rd season)
- Captain: Rollie Stichweh
- Home stadium: Michie Stadium

1964 NCAA University Division independents football records
	Conf.			Overall
Team	W	L	T	W		L		T
No. 3 Notre Dame		–		9	–	1	–	0
Florida State		–		9	–	1	–	1
Colgate		–		7	–	2	–	0
Georgia Tech		–		7	–	3	–	0
Syracuse		–		7	–	4	–	0
Villanova		–		6	–	2	–	0
Boston College		–		6	–	3	–	0
Southern Miss		–		6	–	3	–	0
New Mexico State		–		6	–	4	–	0
Penn State		–		6	–	4	–	0
Memphis State		–		5	–	4	–	0
Utah State		–		5	–	4	–	1
Holy Cross		–		5	–	5	–	0
Buffalo		–		4	–	4	–	1
Colorado State		–		5	–	6	–	0
Air Force		–		4	–	5	–	1
Miami (FL)		–		4	–	5	–	1
Xavier		–		4	–	5	–	1
Army		–		4	–	6	–	0
West Texas State		–		4	–	6	–	0
San Jose State		–		4	–	6	–	0
Pittsburgh		–		3	–	5	–	2
Navy		–		3	–	6	–	1
Dayton		–		3	–	7	–	0
Detroit		–		3	–	7	–	0
Boston University		–		2	–	7	–	0
Houston		–		2	–	6	–	1
Texas Western		–		0	–	8	–	2
Rankings from AP Poll

The 1964 Army Cadets football team represented the United States Military Academy as an independent during the 1964 NCAA University Division football season. Seven players from this team later fought in the Vietnam War.

== Schedule ==
Date	Opponent	Site	Result	Attendance	Source
September 19	The Citadel	Michie Stadium; West Point, NY	W 34–0	17,498–17,500	
September 26	Boston College	Michie Stadium; West Point, NY	W 19–13	27,200	
October 3	at No. 1 Texas	Memorial Stadium; Austin, TX	L 6–17	65,700	
October 10	Penn State	Michie Stadium; West Point, NY	L 2–6	32,268	
October 17	at Virginia	Scott Stadium; Charlottesville, VA	L 14–35	26,500–27,500	
October 24	Duke	Michie Stadium; West Point, NY	L 0–6	31,843	
October 31	Iowa State	Michie Stadium; West Point, NY	W 9–7	22,154	
November 7	vs. Syracuse	Yankee Stadium; Bronx, NY	L 15–27	37,552	
November 14	Pittsburgh	Michie Stadium; West Point, NY	L 8–24	31,963	
November 28	vs. Navy	John F. Kennedy Stadium; Philadelphia, PA (Army–Navy Game)	W 11–8	102,000	
Rankings from AP Poll released prior to the game; Source:

== Game summaries ==
=== Navy ===
Team	1	2	3	4	Total
Navy	0	8	0	0	8
• Army	2	6	0	3	11

- Date: November 28
- Location: JFK Stadium, Philadelphia, PA
- Game attendance: 102,000

Scoring summary
Q1	ARMY	Safety, Staubach tackled in end zone	ARMY 2–0
Q2	ARMY	Champi 5 yard pass from Stichweh (pass failed)	ARMY 8–0
Q2	NAVY	Leiser 1 yard run (Norion pass from Staubach)	TIED 8–8
Q4	ARMY	Nickerson 30 yard field goal	ARMY 11–8

== Roster ==
- Rollie Stichweh
