= 1964 Villanova Wildcats football team =

American college football season

1964 Villanova Wildcats football
- Conference: Independent
- Record: 6–2
- Head coach: Alexander F. Bell (5th season)
- Captains: Al Atkinson; John McDonnell
- Home stadium: Villanova Stadium

1964 NCAA University Division independents football records
	Conf.			Overall
Team	W	L	T	W		L		T
No. 3 Notre Dame		–		9	–	1	–	0
Florida State		–		9	–	1	–	1
Colgate		–		7	–	2	–	0
Georgia Tech		–		7	–	3	–	0
Syracuse		–		7	–	4	–	0
Villanova		–		6	–	2	–	0
Boston College		–		6	–	3	–	0
Southern Miss		–		6	–	3	–	0
New Mexico State		–		6	–	4	–	0
Penn State		–		6	–	4	–	0
Memphis State		–		5	–	4	–	0
Utah State		–		5	–	4	–	1
Holy Cross		–		5	–	5	–	0
Buffalo		–		4	–	4	–	1
Colorado State		–		5	–	6	–	0
Air Force		–		4	–	5	–	1
Miami (FL)		–		4	–	5	–	1
Xavier		–		4	–	5	–	1
Army		–		4	–	6	–	0
West Texas State		–		4	–	6	–	0
San Jose State		–		4	–	6	–	0
Pittsburgh		–		3	–	5	–	2
Navy		–		3	–	6	–	1
Dayton		–		3	–	7	–	0
Detroit		–		3	–	7	–	0
Boston University		–		2	–	7	–	0
Houston		–		2	–	6	–	1
Texas Western		–		0	–	8	–	2
Rankings from AP Poll

The 1964 Villanova Wildcats football team represented the Villanova University during the 1964 NCAA University Division football season. The head coach was Alexander F. Bell, coaching his fifth season with the Wildcats. The team played their home games at Villanova Stadium in Villanova, Pennsylvania.

== Schedule ==
Date	Opponent	Site	Result	Attendance	Source
September 19	at Toledo	Glass Bowl; Toledo, OH	W 22–6	11,752	
September 26	at Holy Cross	Fitton Field; Worcester, MA	W 32–0	14,000	
October 3	VMI	Villanova Stadium; Villanova, PA	W 27–7	12,000	
October 10	Detroit	Villanova Stadium; Villanova, PA	W 34–0	12,700	
October 17	Delaware	Villanova Stadium; Villanova, PA (rivalry)	W 34–0	10,200	
October 31	Xavier	Villanova Stadium; Villanova, PA	W 31–13	12,000	
November 7	Boston College	Villanova Stadium; Villanova, PA	L 7–8	13,500	
November 14	at George Washington	District of Columbia Stadium; Washington, DC	L 6–13	9,100	
