= 1964 Houston Cougars football team =

American college football season

1964 Houston Cougars football
- Conference: Independent
- Record: 2–6–1
- Head coach: Bill Yeoman (3rd season)
- Captain: Horst Paul
- Home stadium: Rice Stadium

1964 NCAA University Division independents football records
	Conf.			Overall
Team	W	L	T	W		L		T
No. 3 Notre Dame		–		9	–	1	–	0
Florida State		–		9	–	1	–	1
Colgate		–		7	–	2	–	0
Georgia Tech		–		7	–	3	–	0
Syracuse		–		7	–	4	–	0
Villanova		–		6	–	2	–	0
Boston College		–		6	–	3	–	0
Southern Miss		–		6	–	3	–	0
New Mexico State		–		6	–	4	–	0
Penn State		–		6	–	4	–	0
Memphis State		–		5	–	4	–	0
Utah State		–		5	–	4	–	1
Holy Cross		–		5	–	5	–	0
Buffalo		–		4	–	4	–	1
Colorado State		–		5	–	6	–	0
Air Force		–		4	–	5	–	1
Miami (FL)		–		4	–	5	–	1
Xavier		–		4	–	5	–	1
Army		–		4	–	6	–	0
West Texas State		–		4	–	6	–	0
San Jose State		–		4	–	6	–	0
Pittsburgh		–		3	–	5	–	2
Navy		–		3	–	6	–	1
Dayton		–		3	–	7	–	0
Detroit		–		3	–	7	–	0
Boston University		–		2	–	7	–	0
Houston		–		2	–	6	–	1
Texas Western		–		0	–	8	–	2
Rankings from AP Poll

The 1964 Houston Cougars football team was an American football team that represented the University of Houston as an independent during the 1964 NCAA University Division football season. In its third season under head coach Bill Yeoman, the team compiled a 2–6–1 record. Horst Paul was the team captain. The team played its home games at Rice Stadium (five games) and Robertson Stadium (one game) in Houston.

== Schedule ==
Date	Time	Opponent	Site	Result	Attendance	Source
September 12		Trinity (TX)	Rice Stadium; Houston, TX	W 34–7	13,000	
September 19		at No. 8 Auburn	Cliff Hare Stadium; Auburn, AL	L 0–30	25,000	
September 25		Texas A&M	Rice Stadium; Houston, TX	W 10–0	30,000	
October 3		at Ole Miss	Hemingway Stadium; Oxford, MS	L 9–31	24,000	
October 10		Tulsa	Rice Stadium; Houston, TX	L 23–31	15,000	
October 24		at Mississippi State	Scott Field; Starkville, MS	L 13–18	27,000	
November 7		Florida State^{†}	Rice Stadium; Houston, TX	T 13–13	16,000	
November 14	8:00 p.m.	Penn State	Rice Stadium; Houston, TX	L 7–24	25,000	
November 28		Cincinnati	Rice Stadium; Houston, TX	L 6–20	10,000	
^{†}Homecoming; Rankings from AP Poll released prior to the game; All times are in Central time
