= 1964 Texas Western Miners football team =

American college football season

1964 Texas Western Miners football
- Conference: Independent
- Record: 0–8–2
- Head coach: Warren Harper (2nd season)
- Home stadium: Sun Bowl

1964 NCAA University Division independents football records
	Conf.			Overall
Team	W	L	T	W		L		T
No. 3 Notre Dame		–		9	–	1	–	0
Florida State		–		9	–	1	–	1
Colgate		–		7	–	2	–	0
Georgia Tech		–		7	–	3	–	0
Syracuse		–		7	–	4	–	0
Villanova		–		6	–	2	–	0
Boston College		–		6	–	3	–	0
Southern Miss		–		6	–	3	–	0
New Mexico State		–		6	–	4	–	0
Penn State		–		6	–	4	–	0
Memphis State		–		5	–	4	–	0
Utah State		–		5	–	4	–	1
Holy Cross		–		5	–	5	–	0
Buffalo		–		4	–	4	–	1
Colorado State		–		5	–	6	–	0
Air Force		–		4	–	5	–	1
Miami (FL)		–		4	–	5	–	1
Xavier		–		4	–	5	–	1
Army		–		4	–	6	–	0
West Texas State		–		4	–	6	–	0
San Jose State		–		4	–	6	–	0
Pittsburgh		–		3	–	5	–	2
Navy		–		3	–	6	–	1
Dayton		–		3	–	7	–	0
Detroit		–		3	–	7	–	0
Boston University		–		2	–	7	–	0
Houston		–		2	–	6	–	1
Texas Western		–		0	–	8	–	2
Rankings from AP Poll

The 1964 Texas Western Miners football team was an American football team that represented Texas Western College (now known as University of Texas at El Paso) as an independent during the 1964 NCAA University Division football season. In its second and final season under head coach Warren Harper, the team compiled a 0–8–2 record and was outscored by a total of 217 to 64.

== Schedule ==
Date	Opponent	Site	Result	Attendance	Source
September 19	at North Texas State	Fouts Field; Denton, TX	T 0–0	6,500	
October 3	at West Texas State	Buffalo Bowl; Canyon, TX	L 0–14	10,208	
October 10	at Arizona State	Sun Devil Stadium; Tempe, AZ	L 13–42	29,127	
October 17	at Wyoming	War Memorial Stadium; Laramie, WY	L 6–20	10,831	
October 24	BYU	Sun Bowl; El Paso, TX	T 18–18	12,362	
October 31	Utah	Sun Bowl; El Paso, TX	L 0–41	10,779	
November 7	New Mexico^{†}	Sun Bowl; El Paso, TX	L 12–20	15,038	
November 14	Arizona	Sun Bowl; El Paso, TX	L 0–14	8,355	
November 21	at New Mexico State	Memorial Stadium; Las Cruces, NM (rivalry)	L 7–13	7,500	
November 26	Colorado State	Sun Bowl; El Paso, TX	L 8–35	5,934	
^{†}Homecoming; Source:
