= 1964 Southern Miss Southerners football team =

American college football season

1964 Southern Miss Southerners football
- Conference: Independent
- Record: 6–3
- Head coach: Thad Vann (16th season)
- Home stadium: Faulkner Field

1964 NCAA University Division independents football records
	Conf.			Overall
Team	W	L	T	W		L		T
No. 3 Notre Dame		–		9	–	1	–	0
Florida State		–		9	–	1	–	1
Colgate		–		7	–	2	–	0
Georgia Tech		–		7	–	3	–	0
Syracuse		–		7	–	4	–	0
Villanova		–		6	–	2	–	0
Boston College		–		6	–	3	–	0
Southern Miss		–		6	–	3	–	0
New Mexico State		–		6	–	4	–	0
Penn State		–		6	–	4	–	0
Memphis State		–		5	–	4	–	0
Utah State		–		5	–	4	–	1
Holy Cross		–		5	–	5	–	0
Buffalo		–		4	–	4	–	1
Colorado State		–		5	–	6	–	0
Air Force		–		4	–	5	–	1
Miami (FL)		–		4	–	5	–	1
Xavier		–		4	–	5	–	1
Army		–		4	–	6	–	0
West Texas State		–		4	–	6	–	0
San Jose State		–		4	–	6	–	0
Pittsburgh		–		3	–	5	–	2
Navy		–		3	–	6	–	1
Dayton		–		3	–	7	–	0
Detroit		–		3	–	7	–	0
Boston University		–		2	–	7	–	0
Houston		–		2	–	6	–	1
Texas Western		–		0	–	8	–	2
Rankings from AP Poll

The 1964 Southern Miss Southerners football team was an American football team that represented the University of Southern Mississippi as an independent during the 1964 NCAA University Division football season. In their sixteenth year under head coach Thad Vann, the team compiled a 6–3 record.

== Schedule ==
Date	Opponent	Site	Result	Attendance	Source
September 26	Southwestern Louisiana	Faulkner Field; Hattiesburg, MS	W 30–0	9,500	
October 3	Richmond	Faulkner Field; Hattiesburg, MS	W 14–9	7,500	
October 10	at Memphis State	Crump Stadium; Memphis, TN (rivalry)	W 20–14	18,005–18,500	
October 17	at Mississippi State	Scott Field; Starkville, MS	L 7–48	19,000	
October 24	at Auburn	Cliff Hare Stadium; Auburn, AL	L 7–14	22,000	
October 31	at Florida State	Doak Campbell Stadium; Tallahassee, FL	L 0–34	26,142	
November 7	Chattanooga^{†}	Faulkner Field; Hattiesburg, MS	W 31–0	11,000	
November 14	Louisiana Tech	Faulkner Field; Hattiesburg, MS (rivalry)	W 14–7	10,000	
November 21	Memphis State	Mississippi Veterans Memorial Stadium; Jackson, MS	W 20–18	9,000	
^{†}Homecoming
