= Jim Carroll (American football) =

American football player (born 1943)

No. 60, 59, 55
- Position: Linebacker

Personal information
- Born: May 6, 1943 (age 83); Jonesboro, Arkansas, U.S.
- Listed height: 6 ft 2 in (1.88 m)
- Listed weight: 230 lb (104 kg)

Career information
- High school: Marist (Brookhaven, Georgia)
- College: Notre Dame (1961-1964)
- NFL draft: 1965: 12th round, 155th overall pick

Career history
- New York Giants (1965–1966); Washington Redskins (1966-1968); Bridgeport Jets (1969); New York Jets (1969)

Awards and highlights
- National champion (1964); Third-team All-American (1964)

Career NFL/AFL statistics
- Fumble recoveries: 3
- Interceptions: 3
- Sacks: 2.5
- Stats at Pro Football Reference

James Samuel Carroll (born May 6, 1943) is an American former professional football player who was a linebacker in the National Football League (NFL) for the New York Giants, the Washington Redskins, and the New York Jets. He played college football for the Notre Dame Fighting Irish and was selected in the 12th round of the 1965 NFL draft.

At the University of Notre Dame, Carroll was team captain and won All-America honors. He played in a total of 61 NFL games during his five-year career.
