= 1964 Utah State Aggies football team =

American college football season

1964 Utah State Aggies football
- Conference: Independent
- Record: 5–4–1
- Head coach: Tony Knap (2nd season)
- Home stadium: Romney Stadium

1964 NCAA University Division independents football records
	Conf.			Overall
Team	W	L	T	W		L		T
No. 3 Notre Dame		–		9	–	1	–	0
Florida State		–		9	–	1	–	1
Colgate		–		7	–	2	–	0
Georgia Tech		–		7	–	3	–	0
Syracuse		–		7	–	4	–	0
Villanova		–		6	–	2	–	0
Boston College		–		6	–	3	–	0
Southern Miss		–		6	–	3	–	0
New Mexico State		–		6	–	4	–	0
Penn State		–		6	–	4	–	0
Memphis State		–		5	–	4	–	0
Utah State		–		5	–	4	–	1
Holy Cross		–		5	–	5	–	0
Buffalo		–		4	–	4	–	1
Colorado State		–		5	–	6	–	0
Air Force		–		4	–	5	–	1
Miami (FL)		–		4	–	5	–	1
Xavier		–		4	–	5	–	1
Army		–		4	–	6	–	0
West Texas State		–		4	–	6	–	0
San Jose State		–		4	–	6	–	0
Pittsburgh		–		3	–	5	–	2
Navy		–		3	–	6	–	1
Dayton		–		3	–	7	–	0
Detroit		–		3	–	7	–	0
Boston University		–		2	–	7	–	0
Houston		–		2	–	6	–	1
Texas Western		–		0	–	8	–	2
Rankings from AP Poll

The 1964 Utah State Aggies football team was an American football team that represented Utah State University as an independent during the 1964 NCAA University Division football season. In their second season under head coach Tony Knap, the Aggies compiled a 5–4–1 record and outscored all opponents by a total of 294 to 136.

The team's statistical leaders included Ron Edwards with 798 passing yards and Craig Murray with 455 rushing yards, 510 receiving yards, and 42 points scored.

== Schedule ==
Date	Opponent	Site	Result	Attendance	Source
September 19	at Arizona State	Sun Devil Stadium; Tempe, AZ	L 8–24	33,217	
September 26	New Mexico State	Romney Stadium; Logan, UT	W 76–0	9,367	
October 3	at Montana	Dornblaser Field; Missoula, MT	W 41–0	5,200	
October 10	Wichita State	Romney Stadium; Logan, UT	W 51–7	10,299	
October 17	at New Mexico	University Stadium; Albuquerque, NM	W 14–3	28,537	
October 24	Colorado State	Romney Stadium; Logan, UT	W 42–13	12,565	
October 31	at BYU	Cougar Stadium; Provo, UT (rivalry)	L 14–28	29,422	
November 7	Wyoming	Romney Stadium; Logan, UT (rivalry)	T 20–20	11,209	
November 14	at Idaho	Bronco Stadium; Boise, ID	L 22–27	10,500	
November 21	at Utah	Ute Stadium; Salt Lake City, UT (rivalry)	L 6–14	24,622	
