= 1964 Navy Midshipmen football team =

American college football season

1964 Navy Midshipmen football
- Conference: Independent
- Record: 3–6–1
- Head coach: Wayne Hardin (6th season)
- Captain: Fred Marlin
- Home stadium: Navy–Marine Corps Memorial Stadium

1964 NCAA University Division independents football records
	Conf.			Overall
Team	W	L	T	W		L		T
No. 3 Notre Dame		–		9	–	1	–	0
Florida State		–		9	–	1	–	1
Colgate		–		7	–	2	–	0
Georgia Tech		–		7	–	3	–	0
Syracuse		–		7	–	4	–	0
Villanova		–		6	–	2	–	0
Boston College		–		6	–	3	–	0
Southern Miss		–		6	–	3	–	0
New Mexico State		–		6	–	4	–	0
Penn State		–		6	–	4	–	0
Memphis State		–		5	–	4	–	0
Utah State		–		5	–	4	–	1
Holy Cross		–		5	–	5	–	0
Buffalo		–		4	–	4	–	1
Colorado State		–		5	–	6	–	0
Air Force		–		4	–	5	–	1
Miami (FL)		–		4	–	5	–	1
Xavier		–		4	–	5	–	1
Army		–		4	–	6	–	0
West Texas State		–		4	–	6	–	0
San Jose State		–		4	–	6	–	0
Pittsburgh		–		3	–	5	–	2
Navy		–		3	–	6	–	1
Dayton		–		3	–	7	–	0
Detroit		–		3	–	7	–	0
Boston University		–		2	–	7	–	0
Houston		–		2	–	6	–	1
Texas Western		–		0	–	8	–	2
Rankings from AP Poll

The 1964 Navy Midshipmen football team represented the United States Naval Academy (USNA) as an independent during the 1964 NCAA University Division football season. The team was led by sixth-year head coach Wayne Hardin.

== Schedule ==
Date	Opponent	Rank	Site	Result	Attendance	Source
September 19	at Penn State	No. 10	Beaver Stadium; University Park, PA	W 21–8	44,648	
September 26	William & Mary^{†}	No. 10	Navy–Marine Corps Memorial Stadium; Annapolis, MD	W 35–6	21,133	
October 3	at No. 8 Michigan	No. 6	Michigan Stadium; Ann Arbor, MI	L 0–21	70,608	
October 9	vs. Georgia Tech		Gator Bowl Stadium; Jacksonville, FL	L 0–17	40,000	
October 17	at California		Memorial Stadium; Berkeley, CA	L 13–27	63,000	
October 24	at Pittsburgh		Pitt Stadium; Pittsburgh, PA	T 14–14	46,656	
October 31	vs. No. 2 Notre Dame		John F. Kennedy Stadium; Philadelphia, PA (rivalry)	L 0–40	66,752	
November 7	at Maryland		Byrd Stadium; College Park, MD (rivalry)	L 22–27	40,000	
November 14	Duke		Navy–Marine Corps Memorial Stadium; Annapolis, MD	W 27–14	28,014	
November 28	vs. Army		John F. Kennedy Stadium; Philadelphia, PA (Army–Navy Game)	L 8–11	102,000	
^{†}Homecoming; Rankings from AP Poll released prior to the game; Source:

== Roster ==
1964 Navy Midshipmen football team roster
Players			Coaches
Offense: Pos. / # / Name / Class; QB / 12 / Roger Staubach / Sr	Defense: Pos. / # / Name / Class	Special teams: Pos. / # / Name / Class	Head coach: Wayne Hardin; Coordinators/assistant coaches Legend: (C) Team captain; (S) Suspended; (I) Ineligible; Injured; Redshirt
