= 1964 Holy Cross Crusaders football team =

American college football season

1964 Holy Cross Crusaders football
- Conference: Independent
- Record: 5–5
- Head coach: Eddie Anderson (21st season)
- Captain: John R. Dugan
- Home stadium: Fitton Field

1964 NCAA University Division independents football records
| | Conf. | | | Overall |
| Team | W | L | T | W | | L | | T |
|---|---|---|---|---|---|---|---|---|
| No. 3 Notre Dame | | – | | 9 | – | 1 | – | 0 |
| Florida State | | – | | 9 | – | 1 | – | 1 |
| Colgate | | – | | 7 | – | 2 | – | 0 |
| Georgia Tech | | – | | 7 | – | 3 | – | 0 |
| Syracuse | | – | | 7 | – | 4 | – | 0 |
| Villanova | | – | | 6 | – | 2 | – | 0 |
| Boston College | | – | | 6 | – | 3 | – | 0 |
| Southern Miss | | – | | 6 | – | 3 | – | 0 |
| New Mexico State | | – | | 6 | – | 4 | – | 0 |
| Penn State | | – | | 6 | – | 4 | – | 0 |
| Memphis State | | – | | 5 | – | 4 | – | 0 |
| Utah State | | – | | 5 | – | 4 | – | 1 |
| Holy Cross | | – | | 5 | – | 5 | – | 0 |
| Buffalo | | – | | 4 | – | 4 | – | 1 |
| Colorado State | | – | | 5 | – | 6 | – | 0 |
| Air Force | | – | | 4 | – | 5 | – | 1 |
| Miami (FL) | | – | | 4 | – | 5 | – | 1 |
| Xavier | | – | | 4 | – | 5 | – | 1 |
| Army | | – | | 4 | – | 6 | – | 0 |
| West Texas State | | – | | 4 | – | 6 | – | 0 |
| San Jose State | | – | | 4 | – | 6 | – | 0 |
| Pittsburgh | | – | | 3 | – | 5 | – | 2 |
| Navy | | – | | 3 | – | 6 | – | 1 |
| Dayton | | – | | 3 | – | 7 | – | 0 |
| Detroit | | – | | 3 | – | 7 | – | 0 |
| Boston University | | – | | 2 | – | 7 | – | 0 |
| Houston | | – | | 2 | – | 6 | – | 1 |
| Texas Western | | – | | 0 | – | 8 | – | 2 |
Rankings from AP Poll

The 1964 Holy Cross Crusaders football team was an American football team that represented the College of the Holy Cross as an independent during the 1964 NCAA University Division football season. Eddie Anderson returned for the 15th consecutive year as head coach, his 21st and final year overall. The team compiled a record of 5–5.

All home games were played at Fitton Field on the Holy Cross campus in Worcester, Massachusetts.

== Schedule ==
| Date | Opponent | Site | Result | Attendance | Source |
|---|---|---|---|---|---|
| September 26 | Villanova | Fitton Field; Worcester, MA | L 0–32 | 14,000 | |
| October 3 | Syracuse | Fitton Field; Worcester, MA | L 8–34 | 12,000 | |
| October 10 | Colgate^{†} | Fitton Field; Worcester, MA | L 0–10 | 10,000 | |
| October 17 | Quantico Marines^ | Fitton Field; Worcester, MA | W 16–0 | 5,000 | |
| October 24 | at Buffalo | Rotary Field; Buffalo, NY | W 20–14 | 8,136 | |
| October 31 | Richmond | Fitton Field; Worcester, MA | W 36–22 | 7,500 | |
| November 7 | No. 10 UMass | Fitton Field; Worcester, MA | L 6–25 | 20,000 | |
| November 14 | at Boston University | Boston University Field; Boston, MA | W 32–0 | 7,000 | |
| November 21 | Connecticut | Fitton Field; Worcester, MA | W 20–6 | 7,500 | |
| November 28 | at Boston College | Alumni Stadium; Chestnut Hill, MA (rivalry) | L 8–10 | 26,909 | |
^{†}Homecoming; ^ Family Weekend; Rankings from AP Poll released prior to the game

== Statistical leaders ==
Statistical leaders for the 1964 Crusaders included:

- Rushing: Jack Lentz, 802 yards and 6 touchdowns on 146 attempts
- Passing: Mike Cunnion, 734 yards, 41 completions and 6 touchdowns on 92 attempts
- Receiving: Dick Kochansky, 144 yards on 15 receptions
- Scoring: Jim Marcellino, 38 points from 6 touchdowns and 1 two-point conversion
- Total offense: Jack Lentz, 973 yards (802 rushing, 171 passing)
- All-purpose yards: Jim Marcellino, 901 yards (365 rushing, 281 returning, 255 receiving)
