= 1964 Colgate Red Raiders football team =

American college football season

1964 Colgate Red Raiders football
- Conference: Independent
- Record: 7–2
- Head coach: Hal Lahar (8th season)
- Captain: Lee Woltman
- Home stadium: Colgate Athletic Field

1964 NCAA University Division independents football records
	Conf.			Overall
Team	W	L	T	W		L		T
No. 3 Notre Dame		–		9	–	1	–	0
Florida State		–		9	–	1	–	1
Colgate		–		7	–	2	–	0
Georgia Tech		–		7	–	3	–	0
Syracuse		–		7	–	4	–	0
Villanova		–		6	–	2	–	0
Boston College		–		6	–	3	–	0
Southern Miss		–		6	–	3	–	0
New Mexico State		–		6	–	4	–	0
Penn State		–		6	–	4	–	0
Memphis State		–		5	–	4	–	0
Utah State		–		5	–	4	–	1
Holy Cross		–		5	–	5	–	0
Buffalo		–		4	–	4	–	1
Colorado State		–		5	–	6	–	0
Air Force		–		4	–	5	–	1
Miami (FL)		–		4	–	5	–	1
Xavier		–		4	–	5	–	1
Army		–		4	–	6	–	0
West Texas State		–		4	–	6	–	0
San Jose State		–		4	–	6	–	0
Pittsburgh		–		3	–	5	–	2
Navy		–		3	–	6	–	1
Dayton		–		3	–	7	–	0
Detroit		–		3	–	7	–	0
Boston University		–		2	–	7	–	0
Houston		–		2	–	6	–	1
Texas Western		–		0	–	8	–	2
Rankings from AP Poll

The 1964 Colgate Red Raiders football team was an American football team that represented Colgate University as an independent during the 1964 NCAA University Division football season. In its third consecutive season under head coach Hal Lahar (his eighth overall), the team compiled a 7–2 record. Lee Woltman was the team captain.

The team played its home games at Colgate Athletic Field in Hamilton, New York.

== Schedule ==
Date	Opponent	Site	Result	Attendance	Source
September 26	at Columbia	Baker Field; New York, NY	L 14–21	28,000	
October 3	Cornell	Colgate Athletic Field; Hamilton, NY (rivalry)	W 8–3	11,847	
October 10	at Holy Cross	Fitton Field; Worcester, MA	W 10–0	10,000	
October 17	at Princeton	Palmer Stadium; Princeton, NJ	L 20–28	20,000	
October 24	at Merchant Marine	Shea Stadium; Flushing, NY	W 21–0	7,435	
October 31	Lehigh	Colgate Athletic Field; Hamilton, NY	W 41–0	5,000	
November 7	Bucknell	Memorial Stadium; Lewisburg, PA	W 14–6	9,000	
November 14	at Buffalo	Rotary Field; Buffalo, NY	W 7–6	8,635	
November 21	at Rutgers	Rutgers Stadium; Piscataway, NJ	W 20–7	17,000	

== Leading players ==
Statistical leaders for the 1964 Red Raiders included:

- Rushing: Lee Woltman, 402 yards and 2 touchdowns on 102 attempts
- Passing: Gerald Barudin, 605 yards, 46 completions and 4 touchdowns on 97 attempts
- Receiving: Peter Beaulieu, 347 yards and 3 touchdowns on 18 receptions
- Total offense: Gerald Barudin, 805 yards (605 passing, 200 rushing)
- Scoring: Gerald Barudin, 30 points from 5 touchdowns
- All-purpose yards: Lee Woltman, 767 yards (402 rushing, 192 receiving, 138 kickoff returning, 35 punt returning)
