= 1964 Big Ten Conference football season =

- Sport: American football
- Teams: 10
- Top draft pick: Dick Butkus
- Champion: Michigan
- Runners-up: Ohio State
- Season MVP: Bob Timberlake

Seasons
- ← 1963 1965 →

1964 Big Ten Conference football standings
	Conf.					Overall
Team	W		L		T	W		L		T
No. 4 Michigan $	6	–	1	–	0	9	–	1	–	0
No. 9 Ohio State	5	–	1	–	0	7	–	2	–	0
Purdue	5	–	2	–	0	6	–	3	–	0
Illinois	4	–	3	–	0	6	–	3	–	0
Minnesota	4	–	3	–	0	5	–	4	–	0
Michigan State	3	–	3	–	0	4	–	5	–	0
Northwestern	2	–	5	–	0	3	–	6	–	0
Wisconsin	2	–	5	–	0	3	–	6	–	0
Iowa	1	–	5	–	0	3	–	6	–	0
Indiana	1	–	5	–	0	2	–	7	–	0
$ – Conference champion; Rankings from AP Poll

The 1964 Big Ten Conference football season was the 69th season of college football played by the member schools of the Big Ten Conference and was a part of the 1964 NCAA University Division football season.

The 1964 Michigan Wolverines football team, under head coach Bump Elliott, won the Big Ten football championship, compiled a 9–1 record, led the conference in both scoring offense (23.5 points per game) and scoring defense (8.3 points allowed per game), was ranked No. 4 in the final AP and UPI polls, and defeated Oregon State, 34–7, in the 1965 Rose Bowl. Quarterback Bob Timberlake received the Chicago Tribune Silver Football trophy as the Big Ten's most valuable player.

The 1964 Ohio State Buckeyes football team, under head coach Woody Hayes, finished in second place with a 7–2 record and was ranked No. 9 in the final AP and UPI polls. Four Ohio State defensive players (Jim Davidson, Ed Orazen, Ike Kelley and Arnie Chonko) received first-team All-American honors.

The Big Ten's individual statistical leaders included Iowa's Gary Snook with 2,062 passing yards, Illinois' Jim Grabowski with 1,004 rushing yards, and Iowa's Karl Noonan with 933 receiving yards. Illinois' center/linebacker Dick Butkus was the Big Ten's only consensus first-team All-American, finished third in voting for the 1964 Heisman Trophy, and was the first Big Ten player selected in the 1965 NFL draft with the third overall pick.

== Season overview ==
=== Results and team statistics ===
Conf. Rank	Team	Head coach	AP final	AP high	Overall record	Conf. record	PPG	PAG	MVP
1	Michigan	Bump Elliott	#4	#4	9–1	6–1	**23.5**	**8.3**	**Bob Timberlake**
2	Ohio State	Woody Hayes	#9	#1	7–2	5–1	16.2	8.4	Ed Orazen
3	Purdue	Jack Mollenkopf	NR	#17	6–3	5–2	18.7	16.2	Bob Hadrick
4 (tie)	Illinois	Pete Elliott	NR	#2	6–3	4–3	15.8	11.1	Dick Butkus
4 (tie)	Minnesota	Murray Warmath	NR	NR	5–4	4–3	15.1	14.6	Joe Pung
6	Michigan State	Duffy Daugherty	NR	#9	4–5	3–3	15.1	15.7	Dick Gordon
7 (tie)	Northwestern	Alex Agase	NR	NR	3–6	2–5	10.6	18.2	Pat Riley
7 (tie)	Wisconsin	Milt Bruhn	NR	NR	3–6	2–5	10.9	21.1	Carl Silvestri
9 (tie)	Iowa	Jerry Burns	NR	NR	3–6	1–5	18.9	23.2	Karl Noonan
9 (tie)	Indiana	Phil Dickens	NR	NR	2–7	1–5	17.2	20.9	Rich Badar

Key
AP final = Team's rank in the final AP Poll of the 1964 season
AP high = Team's highest rank in the AP Poll throughout the 1964 season
PPG = Average of points scored per game
PAG = Average of points allowed per game
MVP = Most valuable player as voted by players on each team as part of the voting process to determine the winner of the Chicago Tribune Silver Football trophy; trophy winner in bold

=== Preseason ===
On December 14, 1963, Ara Parseghian resigned as Northwestern's head football coach to take the same job at Notre Dame. Assistant coach Alex Agase was hired as his replacement at Northwestern.

Illinois came into the 1964 season as the favorite to win the conference championship. The 1963 Illinois team was both the Big Ten and Rose Bowl champion and had stars Dick Butkus and Jim Grabowski as returning veterans. Ohio State and Michigan were expected to be the toughest challengers to Illinois.

=== Regular season ===
==== September 19 ====
On September 19, 1964, two Big Ten teams began their season with victories over non-conference opponents.

- Northwestern 7, Oregon State 3. Northwestern defeated Oregon State, 7–3, before a crowd of 35,805 at Dyche Stadium in Evanston, Illinois. In the first quarter, Northwestern quarterback Tom Myers led the Wildcats on a 95-yard scoring drive in which he completed six of eight passes. Steve Murphy scored on a two-yard run for the game's only touchdown.
- Wisconsin 17, Kansas State 7. Wisconsin defeated Kansas State, 17–7, before a crowd of 46,445 at Camp Randall Stadium in Madison, Wisconsin. Wisconsin scored two touchdowns in the second quarter. Wisconsin fullback Ralph Kurek scored on a one-yard run, and June scored when he recovered quarterback Harold Brandt's fumble in the end zone. Kaye also kicked a field goal for Wisconsin in the fourth quarter.

==== September 26 ====
On September 26, 1964, all ten conference saw action in one conference game and eight non-conference games. The non-conference games resulted in five victories and three losses, giving the conference a 7–3 record against conference opponents to that point in the season.

- Illinois 20, California 14. Illinois (ranked No. 3 in the AP Poll) defeated California, 20–14, before a crowd of 44,704 at California Memorial Stadium in Berkeley, California. With less than a minute remaining in the game, California quarterback Craig Morton appeared to have completed a touchdown pass, but the receiver was ruled out of bounds. Fred Custardo scored two touchdowns for Illinois, and Jim Grabowski scored one.
- Ohio State 27, SMU 8. Ohio State (ranked No. 5 in the AP Poll) defeated SMU, 27–8, before a crowd of 80,737 at Ohio Stadium in Columbus, Ohio. Bob Funk kicked two field goals and three extra points for Ohio State. Ohio State also intercepted three SMU passes.
- Michigan 24, Air Force 7. Michigan defeated Air Force, 24–7, before a crowd of 69,888 at Michigan Stadium in Ann Arbor, Michigan. Michigan quarterback Bob Timberlake scored on a one-yard touchdown run and led Michigan on two 80-yard touchdown drives. Mel Anthony scored a touchdown on a four-yard run in the second quarter, and Timberlake kicked a 26-yard field goal at the end of the first half. Michigan also recovered three Air Force fumbles.
- Purdue 17, Ohio 0. Purdue defeated Ohio, 17–0, before a crowd of 45,321 at Ross–Ade Stadium in West Lafayette, Indiana. In his college football debut, Bob Griese scored every point in the game with two touchdowns on quarterback sneaks, a 36-yard field goal, and two extra point kicks. Ohio was held to 93 yards combined passing and rushing.
- Nebraska 26, Minnesota 21. In a nationally televised game, Nebraska defeated Minnesota, 26–21, before a crowd of 50,237 at Memorial Stadium in Minneapolis. Minnesota led, 21–12, with seven-and-a-half minutes remaining, but Nebraska scored two touchdowns in the closing minutes.
- Notre Dame 31, Wisconsin 7. Notre Dame defeated Wisconsin, 31–7, before a crowd of 64,398 at Camp Randall Stadium in Madison.
- Northwestern 14, Indiana 13. Northwestern defeated Indiana, 14–13, before a crowd of 30,727 at Seventeenth Street in Bloomington, Indiana.
- Iowa 34, Idaho 24. Iowa defeated Idaho, 34–24, before a crowd of 43,300 at Kinnick Stadium in Iowa City. Idaho led, 21–14, at halftime and 24–21 at the start of the fourth quarter. Iowas scored 13 points in the fourth quarter to take the lead. Halfback Dalton Kimble scored three Iowa touchdowns, and Gary Snook passed for 226 yards.
- North Carolina 21, Michigan State 15. North Carolina defeated Michigan State, 21-15, at Kenan Memorial Stadium in Chapel Hill, North Carolina.

==== October 3 ====
On October 3, 1964, nine Big Ten teams saw action in two conference games and five non-conference games. Wisconsin had a bye week. The non-conference games resulted in four victories and one loss, giving the conference a 10–4 record against conference opponents to that point in the season.

- Michigan State 17, USC 7. Michigan State defeated USC (ranked No. 2 in the AP Poll), 17–7, before a crowd of 70,104 at Spartan Stadium in East Lansing, Michigan. Michigan State took a 3–0 lead at halftime on a 49-yard field goal by Dick Kenney. Clinton Jones scored a touchdown to give Michigan a 10–0 lead in the third quarter. USC closed the gap with its own third quarter touchdown, and 1965 Heisman Trophy winner Mike Garrett rushed for 94 yards on 26 carries. In the end, the Spartans' defense held the Trojans, which had scored 40 points against No. 2 Oklahoma the prior week, to the lone touchdown.
- Illinois 17, Northwestern 6. Illinois (ranked No. 3 in the AP Poll) defeated Northwestern, 17–6, before a crowd of 52,062 at Dyche Stadium in Evanston. Illinois quarterback Fred Custardo completed 10 of 13 passes and kicked a field goal and two extra points. Sammy Price scored two touchdowns for the Illini. Northwestern quarterback Tommy Myers completed only nine of 28 passes and was intercepted four times.
- Ohio State 17, Indiana 9. Ohio State (ranked No. 5 in the AP Poll) defeated Indiana, 17–9, before a crowd of 81,834 at Ohio Stadium in Columbus. Indiana quarterback Rich Badar passed for 227 yards and a touchdown, but Ohio State defensive back Arnie Chonko intercepted three passes, the third coming with 14 seconds remaining in the game and Indiana at Ohio State's eight-yard line. In a departure from Ohio State's usual focus on the run game, Buckeye quarterback completed 15 of 22 passes for 164 yards and a touchdown. Indiana fullback Tom Nowatzke rushed for 75 yards kicked a Big Ten record 50-yard field goal.
- Michigan 21, Navy 0. Michigan (ranked No. 8 in the AP Poll) defeated Navy (ranked No. 6), 21–0, before a crowd of 70,608 at Michigan Stadium in Ann Arbor. The game was marked by 11 turnovers, six by Navy and five by Michigan. Navy quarterback Roger Staubach completed 16 of 30 passes for 166 yards but was intercepted twice. Staubach was eventually forced from the game, limping after being knocked to the turf by Michigan defensive tackle Bill Yearby. The game broke a 20-game streak during which the Midshipmen had not been shut out under Staubach. The New York Times wrote that the Wolverines "brought Roger Staubach, the heroic middie quarterback, back into focus as an ordinary mortal." Michigan wingback Carl Ward rushed for 74 yards on 18 carries and scored two of Michigan's three touchdowns. Michigan linebacker Tom Cecchini had two fumble recoveries and an interception in the game.
- Notre Dame 34, Purdue 15. Notre Dame (ranked No. 9 in the AP Poll) defeated Purdue, 34–15, before a crowd of 59,611 at Notre Dame Stadium in South Bend, Indiana.
- Iowa 28, Washington 18. Iowa defeated Washington (ranked No. 10 in the AP Poll), 28–18, before a crowd of 47,906 at Kinnick Stadium in Iowa City, Iowa.
- Minnesota 26, California 20. Minnesota defeated California, 26-20, before a crowd of 53,000 at California Memorial Stadium in Berkeley, California.

==== October 10 ====
On October 10, 1964, all 10 conference team met in five conference games. Heading into the October 10 games, four Big Ten teams were ranked in the top ten of that week's AP Poll: Illinois at No. 2; Ohio State at No. 4; Michigan at No. 7; and Michigan State at No. 9.

- Ohio State 26, Illinois 0. Ohio State (ranked No. 4 in the AP Poll) defeated Illinois (ranked No. 2), 26–0, before a crowd of 71,227 at Memorial Stadium in Champaign. Ohio State scored in the early minutes of the game after John Fill intercepted a pass and returned it 48 yards. Ohio State fullback Willard Sander scored two touchdowns. Quarterback Don Unverferth ran for a touchdown and completed eight of 18 passes for 130 yards. Illinois had not beaten Ohio State since 1950.
- Michigan 17, Michigan State 10. Michigan (ranked No. 7 in the AP Poll) defeated Michigan State (ranked No. 9), 17–10, before a crowd of 78,234 at Spartan Stadium in East Lansing. Michigan had not defeated Michigan State since 1955. The game attracted "the largest crowd ever assembled at Spartan Stadium" up to that time. Michigan State scored its only touchdown in the first quarter after recovering a fumble recovery off an errant pitch from Bob Timberlake to Mel Anthony. Michigan State led, 10–3, halfway through the fourth quarter, but Michigan scored 14 points in the final seven minutes on a comeback led by sophomore halfback Rick Sygar. With seven minutes remaining, Sygar caught a five-yard touchdown pass from Timberlake. On the final drive, he took a pitch from Timberlake at the Michigan State 31-yard line and threw a touchdown pass to John Henderson. Having missed a two-point conversion attempt on the first Michigan touchdown, Timberlake threw to Steve Smith for the two-point conversion on the final score.
- Purdue 28, Wisconsin 7. Purdue defeated Wisconsin, 28–7, before a crowd of 44,396 at Ross–Ade Stadium in West Lafayette.
- Minnesota 21, Northwestern 18. Minnesota defeated Northwestern, 21-18, before a crowd of 53,257 at Memorial Stadium in Minneapolis.
- Iowa 21, Indiana 20. Iowa defeated Indiana, 21–20, before a crowd of 31,108 at Seventeenth Street Stadium in Bloomington.

==== October 17 ====
On October 17, 1964, the 10 conference teams played four conference games and two non-conference games. The non-conference games resulted in one victory and one loss, giving the conference an 11–5 record against conference opponents to that point in the season.

- Ohio State 17, USC 0. Ohio State (ranked No. 2 in the AP Poll) defeated USC, 17–0, before a crowd of 84,315 at Ohio Stadium in Columbus. Ohio State fullback Bill Sander rushed for 120 yards and a touchdown on 29 carries. The Buckeye defense held the USC running backs (including Mike Garrett) to 64 rushing yards. Arnie Chonko also intercepted two USC passes. USC had defeated Ohio State, 32–3, one year earlier. After shutting out USC, Ohio State was ranked No. 1 in the following week's AP Poll.
- Purdue 21, Michigan 20. Purdue defeated Michigan (ranked No. 5 in the AP Poll), 21–20, before a crowd of 60,924 at Michigan Stadium in Ann Arbor. Michigan quarterback Bob Timberlake rushed for 113 yards and two touchdowns on 18 carries and passed for 145 yards and a touchdown. Purdue's Bob Griese completed a 66-yard touchdown pass to Jim Morel in the first quarter. Trailing by seven points in the fourth quarter, Timberlake ran 54 yards for a touchdown, and Michigan tried for a two-point conversion rather than tie the game with an extra point; Timberlake carried the ball on an end run but was stopped short of the goal line. The Wolverines lost despite out-gaining the Boilermakers 435 yards to 268.
- Illinois 14, Minnesota 0. Illinois defeated Minnesota, 21-18, before a crowd of 53,257 at Memorial Stadium in Minneapolis.
- Indiana 27, Michigan State 20. In the annual rivalry game for the Old Brass Spittoon, Indiana defeated Michigan State, 27–20, before a crowd of 38,257 at Seventeenth Street Stadium in Bloomington.
- Wisconsin 31, Iowa 21. Wisconsin defeated Iowa, 31–21, before a crowd of 65,713 at Camp Randall Stadium in Madison.
- Miami (OH) 28, Northwestern 27. Northwestern lost to Bo Schembechler's underdog Miami (OH) Redskins, 28-27, at Dyche Stadium in Evanston. Each team scored four touchdowns, and the difference was Gary Durchik's block of an extra point attempt by Dean Dickie in the second quarter.

==== October 24 ====
On October 24, 1964, the 10 conference teams played four conference games and two non-conference games. The non-conference games resulted in two victories, giving the conference a 13–5 record against conference opponents to that point in the season.

- Ohio State 28, Wisconsin 3. Ohio State (ranked No. 1 in the AP Poll) defeated Wisconsin, 28–3, before a crowd of 84,365 at Ohio Stadium in Columbus.
- Michigan 19, Minnesota 12. In the annual battle for the Little Brown Jug, Michigan defeated Minnesota, 19–12, before a crowd of 61,859 at Michigan Stadium in Ann Arbor. Prior to 1964, Minnesota had defeated Michigan for four consecutive years. Michigan led the game, 19–0, in the fourth quarter and held off a comeback attempt by the Golden Gophers. Minnesota scored two fourth-quarter touchdowns, but missed twice on two-point conversion attempts. The Golden Gophers closed the score to 19–12 on a 91-yard interception return by Kraig Lofquist. They subsequently drove to the Michigan three-yard line, but the Michigan defense held on fourth down. Michigan gained 311 rushing yards in the game, including 102 yards by Carl Ward, 98 yards by Mel Anthony and 79 yards by Bob Timberlake. Michigan's scoring came on touchdown runs by Anthony and Timberlake, a field goal and two extra points by Timberlake, and a safety.
- Purdue 19, Iowa 14. Purdue defeated Iowa, 19–14, at Iowa Stadium in Iowa City.
- Indiana 28, Miami (FL) 14. Indiana defeated Miami (FL), 28–14, before a crowd of 33,567 at the Orange Bowl in Miami.
- Illinois 26, UCLA 7. Illinois defeated UCLA, 26–7, before a crowd of 68,727 at Memorial Stadium in Champaign.
- Michigan State 24, Northwestern 6. Michigan State defeated Northwestern, 24-6, at Spartan Stadium in East Lansing.

==== October 31 ====
On October 31, 1964, all 10 conference teams met in conference games.

- Ohio State 21, Iowa 19. Ohio State (ranked No. 1 in the AP Poll) defeated Iowa, 21–19, before a crowd of 58,700 at Iowa Stadium in Iowa City. After a close game with Iowa, Ohio State dropped to No. 2 in the following week's AP Poll.
- Michigan 35, Northwestern 0. Michigan defeated Northwestern, 35–0, before a crowd of 54,615 at Michigan Stadium in Ann Arbor. Michigan rushed for 336 yards, including 81 yards by Bob Timberlake, 57 yards by Carl Ward, and 50 yards each by Jim Detwiler and Mel Anthony. Timberlake ran for two touchdowns and completed nine of 15 passes for 84 yards, giving him 165 yards of total offense. Rick Volk also threw a 33-yard touchdown pass to John Henderson in the second quarter. Michigan's defense held the Wildcats to only 44 rushing yards to give the Wolverines their second shutout of the year.
- Purdue 26, Illinois 14. Purdue defeated Illinois, 26–14, before a crowd of 59,425 at Ross–Ade Stadium in West Lafayette.
- Minnesota 21, Indiana 0. Minnesota defeated Indiana, 21-0, before a crowd of 33,245 at Memorial Stadium in Bloomington.
- Michigan State 22, Wisconsin 6. Michigan State defeated Wisconsin, 22–6, before a crowd of 65,728 at Camp Randall Stadium in Madison.

==== November 7 ====
On November 7, 1964, the 10 conference teams played four conference games and two non-conference games. The non-conference games resulted in two losses, giving the conference a 13–7 record against conference opponents to that point in the season.

- Penn State 27, Ohio State 0. Ohio State (ranked No. 2 in the AP Poll) lost to unranked Penn State, 27–0, before a crowd of 84,279 at Ohio Stadium in Columbus.
- Michigan State 21, Purdue 7. Michigan State defeated Purdue (ranked No. 10 in the AP Poll), 21-7, at Spartan Stadium in East Lansing.
- Michigan 21, Illinois 6. Michigan defeated Illinois, 21–6, before a crowd of 62,415 at Michigan Stadium in Ann Arbor. After failing to convert a first down in the first quarter, Michigan scored two touchdowns in the second quarter on a run by Carl Ward and a 24-yard pass from Bob Timberlake to Jim Detwiler. Michigan's first touchdown followed an interception by Frank Nunley at the Illinois 36-yard line, and the second touchdown followed a fumble recovery by Gerald Mader. In the third quarter, Timberlake ran the ball for a touchdown from the one-yard line to conclude a 91-yard drive. The game marked the fifth consecutive victory for Michigan coach Bump Elliott against his brother, Illinois coach Pete Elliott. The Elliott brothers played together in the backfield of Michigan's undefeated 1947 "Mad Magicians" team.
- Minnesota 14, Iowa 13. Minnesota defeated Iowa, 14-13, before a crowd of 64,301 at Memorial Stadium in Minneapolis.
- Oregon State 24, Indiana 14. Indiana lost to Oregon State, 24–14, before a crowd of 20,389 at Parker Stadium in Corvallis, Oregon.
- Northwestern 17, Wisconsin 13. Northwestern defeated Wisconsin, 17–13, before a crowd of 65,388 at Dyche Stadium in Evanston.

==== November 14 ====
On November 14, 1964, the 10 conference teams played four conference games and two non-conference games. The non-conference games resulted in two losses, giving the conference a 13–9 record against conference opponents to that point in the season.

- Michigan 34, Iowa 20. Michigan (ranked No. 6) defeated Iowa, 34–20, at Iowa Stadium in Iowa City. Michigan took advantage of seven Iowa turnovers, all inside the Iowa 30-yard line. Mel Anthony rushed for 121 yards and scored three touchdowns on 20 carries. Bob Timberlake contributed 216 yards of total offense with 80 rushing yards and 134 passing yards. Timberlake had a 14-yard touchdown run and also threw a touchdown pass to John Henderson. Despite throwing three interceptions, Iowa quarterback Gary Snook completed 13 passes and broke the Big Ten record for the most pass completions in a season. With six catches in the game, Iowa's Karl Noonan also broke the conference record for most pass receptions in a season.
- Ohio State 10, Northwestern 0. Ohio State (ranked No. 7) defeated Northwestern, 10–0, before a crowd of 83,525 at Ohio Stadium in Columbus. Northwestern had defeated Ohio State in both 1962 and 1963. Ohio State quarterback Don Unverferth led the Buckeyes to 241 yards of total offense.
- Illinois 29, Wisconsin 0. Illinois defeated Wisconsin, 29–0, before a crowd of 55,077 at Memorial Stadium in Champaign. Jim Grabowski broke the Big Ten rushing record with 239 yards. The prior record was set by Bill Daley of Michigan with 215 yards in a game in 1943. He also scored two touchdowns and set an Illinois record with 33 carries. Illinois out-gained Wisconsin, 332 rushing yards to 23.
- Minnesota 14, Purdue 7. Minnesota defeated Purdue, 14-7, before a crowd of 50,255 at Memorial Stadium in Minneapolis. Minnesota quarterback John Hankinson completed eight of 15 passes for 159 yards and two touchdowns. With his totals in the game, he broke Minnesota single season records for passing yards and completions, surpassing the marks set by Duane Blaska in 1962.
- Notre Dame 34, Michigan State 7. In the annual Michigan State–Notre Dame football rivalry game, the Fighting Irish (ranked No. 1 in the AP Poll) defeated the Spartans, 34–7, before a crowd of 59,265 at Notre Dame Stadium in South Bend. It was the first Notre Dame victory over Michigan State since 1954. Notre Dame's Nick Eddy rushed for two touchdowns, and John Huarte passed for a touchdown and ran for another.
- Oregon 29, Indiana 21. Indiana lost to Oregon, 29–21, before a crowd of 20,708 at Seventeenth Street Stadium in Bloomington. Indiana led, 21-7, at halftime, but Oregon scored 22 unanswered points in the second half. Oregon's Bob Berry threw two touchdown passes and ran for another.

==== November 21 ====
On November 21, 1964, nine conference teams played four conference games and one non-conference game. Northwestern had a bye week. The non-conference game resulted in a loss, giving the conference a 13–8 record against conference opponents to that point in the season.

- Michigan 10, Ohio State 0. Michigan (ranked No. 6 in the AP Poll) defeated Ohio State (ranked No. 7), 10–0, before a crowd of 84,685 at Ohio Stadium in Columbus. The game was played with winds blowing at 23 miles an hour and temperatures in the low 20s. Michigan scored its first touchdown on a 17-yard touchdown pass from Bob Timberlake to Jim Detwiler with 44 seconds remaining in the first half. The touchdown followed a 50-yard punt by Stan Kempe. Ohio State's Bo Rein lost the punt in the sun, fumbled, and the ball was recovered by John Henderson. The only other points in the game came on a 27-yard field goal by Timberlake. With the victory, Michigan won the Big Ten Conference championship for the first time in 14 years.
- Purdue 28, Indiana 22. In the annual battle for the Old Oaken Bucket, Purdue defeated Indiana, 28–22, in 15 degree weather at Ross–Ade Stadium in West Lafayette. The crowd of 59,932 was a Purdue single-game record. Purdue fullback Gordon Teter rushed for 126 yards and two touchdowns on 31 carries.
- Illinois 16, Michigan State 0. Illinois defeated Michigan State, 16–0, before a crowd of 32,000 in 18 degree weather at Memorial Stadium in Champaign. Jim Grabowski ran 58 yards for a touchdown in the second quarter. Illinois also scored on a safety in the fourth quarter. The Illinois victory was its fourth in a row over Michigan State in Champaign. The loss gave the Spartans their first losing season since 1958.
- Wisconsin 14, Minnesota 7. In the annual battle for Paul Bunyan's Axe, Wisconsin defeated Minnesota, 14–7, in 11 degree weather before a crowd of 61,306 at Camp Randall Stadium in Madison. Wisconsin came into the game with a 1–5 record, while Minnesota was 4–2. Wisconsin running back Ron Smith led the way in Wisconsin's upset victory, gaining 160 of the Badgers' 318 yards.
- Notre Dame 28, Iowa 0. Notre Dame (ranked No. 1 in the AP Poll) defeated Iowa, 28–0. The game was played in 13 degree weather before a crowd of 56,000 at Notre Dame Stadium in South Bend. Notre Dame receiver Jack Snow improved his Notre Dame single-season receiving records to 50 catches and 956 yards. Quarterback John Huarte also set new Notre Dame records for passing yardage (1,790) and total yards (1,800).

=== Bowl games ===
On January 1, 1965, Michigan (ranked No. 4 in the final AP Poll) played in the 1965 Rose Bowl, defeating the Oregon State Beavers (ranked No. 8), 34–7. The game marked Michigan's fourth appearance in the Rose Bowl. In its three prior appearances (1902, 1948, and 1951), Michigan was 3–0 and had outscored opponents 112–6. Michigan was selected as an 11-point favorite over Oregon State.

After a scoreless first quarter, Oregon State took a 7–0 lead with a five-yard touchdown pass from Paul Brothers to Doug McDougal. Later in the second quarter, Michigan scored its first touchdown of the game on an 84-yard run by Mel Anthony. Anthony's run broke the Rose Bowl record for the longest run from scrimmage. Dick Sygar missed the extra point, and Oregon State led 7–6. On Michigan's next drive, Carl Ward ran 43 yards for a touchdown. Michigan missed an attempted two-point conversion on an incomplete pass from Bob Timberlake to Ben Farabee, and Michigan led 12–7 at halftime.

In the second half, Michigan's defense shut out the Beavers, 22 to 0. Mel Anthony, who scored three touchdowns in the game, was named the player of the game. Michigan totaled 332 rushing yards, including 123 by Anthony and 88 by Carl Ward. The Michigan defense held Oregon State to 64 rushing yards in the game.

After studying game film from the Rose Bowl, Oregon State coach Tommy Prothro said he was convinced that the 1964 Michigan team was "the greatest football team he has ever seen." Prothro added, "The pictures are really interesting. There were times when our players blasted Michigan players at full speed and only wound up flat on their backs with the other people on top of them. I've never seen such hitting."

=== Post-season developments ===
On December 1, 1964, both the Associated Press (AP) and United Press International (UPI) released their final college football polls. Both the AP and UPI picked Alabama (which went on to lose to Texas in the 1965 Orange Bowl) at the No. 1 spot, Michigan at No. 4 and Ohio State at No. 9. Two other Big Ten schools were ranked in the UPI's second ten, Illinois at No. 15 and Michigan State at No. 20.

On December 22, 1964, Phil Dickens resigned as Indiana's head football coach and was given a new position as the university's general manager of off-campus physical facilities. In seven seasons, he compiled a 20-41-2 record with the Hoosiers. Due to over-zealous recruiting, he had been suspended for the 1957 season, and the team had been placed on probation from 1960 to 1963.

== Statistical leaders ==
The Big Ten's individual statistical leaders for the 1964 season include the following:

=== Passing yards ===
Rank	Name	Team	Yards
1	Gary Snook	Iowa	2,062
2	Rich Badar	Indiana	1,571
3	John Hankinson	Minnesota	1,084
4	Hal Brandt	Wisconsin	1,059
5	Fred Custardo	Illinois	1,012

=== Rushing yards ===
Rank	Name	Team	Yards
1	Jim Grabowski	Illinois	1,004
2	Dick Gordon	Michigan State	741
3	Willard Sander	Ohio State	626
4	Gordon Teter	Purdue	614
5	Mel Anthony	Michigan	579

=== Receiving yards ===
Rank	Name	Team	Yards
1	Karl Noonan	Iowa	933
2	Bill Malinchak	Indiana	634
3	Gene Washington	Michigan State	542
4	Jimmy Jones	Wisconsin	529
5	Rich O'Hara	Iowa	469

=== Total yards ===
Rank	Name	Team	Yards
1	Gary Snook	Iowa	2,044
2	Rich Badar	Indiana	1,625
3	Bob Timberlake	Michigan	1,381
4	John Hankinson	Minnesota	1,262
5	Fred Custardo	Illinois	1,163

=== Scoring ===
Rank	Name	Team	Points
1	Jim Grabowski	Illinois	60
2	Bob Timberlake	Michigan	54
2	Randy Minniear	Purdue	54
2	Mel Anthony	Michigan	54
5	Dalton Kimble	Iowa	48

== Awards and honors ==
=== All-Big Ten honors ===
The following players were picked by the Associated Press (AP) and/or the United Press International (UPI) as first-team players on the 1964 All-Big Ten Conference football team.

Offense

Position	Name	Team	Selectors
Quarterback/halfback	Bob Timberlake	Michigan	AP [hb], UPI [qb]
Quarterback	Gary Snook	Iowa	AP
Halfback	Dick Gordon	Michigan State	AP, UPI
Halfback/end	Karl Noonan	Iowa	AP [end], UPI [hb]
Fullback	Jim Grabowski	Illinois	AP, UPI
Offensive end	Bill Malinchak	Indiana	AP, UPI
Offensive end	Bob Hadrick	Purdue	UPI
Offensive tackle	Archie Sutton	Illinois	AP, UPI
Offensive tackle	Jerry Rush	Michigan State	AP
Offensive tackle	Jim Davidson	Ohio State	UPI
Offensive guard	Don Croftcheck	Indiana	AP, UPI
Offensive guard	Dan Porretta	Ohio State	AP, UPI
Center	Joe Cerne	Northwestern	AP, UPI

Defense

Position	Name	Team	Selectors
Defensive end	Aaron Brown	Minnesota	AP
Defensive end	Harold Wells	Purdue	AP
Defensive end	Jim Conley	Michigan	UPI
Defensive end	Bill Spahr	Ohio State	UPI
Defensive tackle	Bill Yearby	Michigan	AP, UPI
Defensive tackle	Jim Garcia	Purdue	AP, UPI
Linebacker	Dick Butkus	Illinois	AP, UPI
Linebacker	Ike Kelley	Ohio State	AP, UPI
Linebacker	Tom Cecchini	Michigan	AP
Linebacker	Tom Bugel	Ohio State	UPI
Defensive back	Arnie Chonko	Ohio State	AP, UPI
Defensive back	George Donnelly	Illinois	AP, UPI
Defensive back	Kraig Lofquist	Minnesota	AP, UPI
Defensive back	Tom Nowatzke	Indiana	AP
Defensive back	Charles Migyanka	Michigan State	UPI

=== All-American honors ===
At the end of the 1964 season, Big Ten players secured only one of the consensus first-team picks for the 1964 College Football All-America Team. The Big Ten's consensus All-American was:

Position	Name	Team	Selectors
Center	Dick Butkus	Illinois	AFCA, AP, CP, FWAA, TSN, UPI, FN, Time, WCFF

Other Big Ten players who were named first-team All-Americans by at least one selector were:

Position	Name	Team	Selectors
Quarterback	Bob Timberlake	Michigan	AP, FWAA, FN
Offensive end	Karl Noonan	Iowa	NEA, FN
Running back	Jim Grabowski	Illinois	UPI, FN
Fullback	Tom Nowatzke	Indiana	AFCA
Guard	Don Croftcheck	Indiana	TSN
Guard	Archie Sutton	Illinois	Time
Defensive end	Harold Wells	Purdue	AP
Defensive tackle	Bill Yearby	Michigan	CP, FN, NEA
Defensive tackle	Jim Davidson	Ohio State	TSN, Time
Defensive tackle	Ed Orazen	Ohio State	FN
Middle guard	Ike Kelley	Ohio State	FWAA, FN
Defensive back	Arnie Chonko	Ohio State	AP, NEA
Defensive back	George Donnelly	Illinois	TSN, Time

=== Other awards ===
On December 3, 1964, the Heisman Trophy was awarded to John Huarte of Notre Dame. Two Big Ten players finished among the top four in the voting for the trophy. They were: Illinois center/linebacker Dick Butkus (third) and Michigan quarterback Bob Timberlake (fourth).

== 1965 NFL draft ==
The following Big Ten players were among the first 100 picks in the 1965 NFL draft:

Name	Position	Team	Round	Overall pick
Dick Butkus	Linebacker	Illinois	1	3
Tom Nowatzke	Fullback	Indiana	1	11
George Donnelly	Back	Illinois	1	13
Archie Sutton	Tackle	Illinois	2	15
Joe Cerne	Center	Northwestern	2	16
Jim Garcia	Tackle	Purdue	2	17
Jerry Rush	Tackle	Michigan State	2	25
Bo Scott	Running back	Ohio State	3	32
Bob Timberlake	Quarterback	Michigan	3	33
Frank Marchlewski	Center	Minnesota	5	60
John Henderson	End	Michigan	5	63
Ed Flanagan	Center	Purdue	5	64
Arnie Simkus	Tackle	Michigan	6	72
Roger Jacobazzi	Tackle	Wisconsin	7	86
Dick Gordon	Running back	Michigan State	7	88
John Hankinson	Quarterback	Minnesota	8	100
