= 1965 Detroit Lions season =

NFL team season

- Head coach: Harry Gilmer
- Home stadium: Tiger Stadium

Results
- Record: 6–7–1
- Division place: 6th NFL Western
- Playoffs: Did not qualify

The 1965 Detroit Lions season was the 36th season in franchise history. Harry Gilmer replaced George Wilson as the Lions head coach. The Lions failed to improve on their 1964 record of 7–5–2, finishing at 6–7–1.

== Offseason ==
=== NFL draft ===
Round	Pick	Player	Position	School
1	11	Tom Nowatzke	Fullback	Indiana

== Regular season ==
=== Schedule ===
Week	Date	Opponent	Result	Record	Attendance
1	September 19	Los Angeles Rams	W 20–0	1–0	46,941
2	September 26	at Minnesota Vikings	W 31–29	2–0	46,826
3	October 3	Washington Redskins	W 14–10	3–0	52,627
4	October 10	at Baltimore Colts	L 7–31	3–1	60,238
5	October 17	Green Bay Packers	L 21–31	3–2	56,712
6	October 24	at Chicago Bears	L 10–38	3–3	45,658
7	October 31	at Los Angeles Rams	W 31–7	4–3	35,137
8	November 7	at Green Bay Packers	W 12–7	5–3	50,852
9	November 14	San Francisco 49ers	L 21–27	5–4	54,534
10	November 21	Chicago Bears	L 10–17	5–5	51,499
11	November 25	Baltimore Colts	T 24–24	5–5–1	55,036
12	December 5	at San Francisco 49ers	L 14–17	5–6–1	38,463
13	December 12	Minnesota Vikings	L 7–29	5–7–1	45,420
14	December 19	at Philadelphia Eagles	W 35–28	6–7–1	56,718

- Thursday (November 25: Thanksgiving)

== Standings ==
NFL Western Conference
	W	L	T	PCT	CONF	PF	PA	STK
Green Bay Packers	10	3	1	.769	8–3–1	316	224	T1
Baltimore Colts	10	3	1	.769	8–3–1	389	284	W1
Chicago Bears	9	5	0	.643	7–5	409	275	L1
San Francisco 49ers	7	6	1	.538	6–5–1	421	402	T1
Minnesota Vikings	7	7	0	.500	5–7	383	403	W2
Detroit Lions	6	7	1	.462	4–7–1	257	295	W1
Los Angeles Rams	4	10	0	.286	2–10	269	328	L1

Note: Tie games were not officially counted in the standings until 1972.

=== Roster ===
1965 Detroit Lions roster
Quarterbacks: 15 George Izo; 18 Tom Myers; 16 Milt Plum; Running backs: 45 Bobby Felts; 31 Amos Marsh; 35 Tom Nowatzke; 33 Nick Pietrosante; 23 Tom Watkins; Wide receivers: 89 Gail Cogdill; 87 John Henderson; 25 Pat Studstill P; Tight ends: 80 Jim Gibbons; 88 Ron Kramer	Offensive linemen: 54 Ed Flanagan C; 79 John Gonzaga G; 75 John Gordy G; 62 Ted Karras G; 70 Daryl Sanders T; 66 Jim Simon T; 73 Roger Shoals T; 51 Bob Whitlow C; Defensive linemen: 76 Roger Brown DT; 74 Larry Hand DE; 71 Alex Karras DT; 78 Darris McCord DE; 82 Jerry Rush DT; 88 Sam Williams DE	Linebackers: 59 Ernie Clark OLB; 67 Wally Hilgenberg OLB; 53 Mike Lucci OLB; 56 Joe Schmidt MLB; 55 Wayne Walker OLB/K; Defensive backs: 46 Jim Kearney CB/S; 81 Night Train Lane CB; 44 Dick LeBeau CB; 21 Bruce Maher SS; 47 Wayne Rasmussen FS; 43 Bobby Smith CB/S; 27 Bobby Thompson CB; 48 Tom Vaughn FS	Reserve lists: 41 Terry Barr WR (IR); 32 Joe Don Looney RB (IR); 72 J. D. Smith T (IR); -- Warren Wells WR (Military); rookies in italics
