= 1964 Indiana Hoosiers football team =

American college football season

1964 Indiana Hoosiers football
- Conference: Big Ten Conference
- Record: 2–7 (1–5 Big Ten)
- Head coach: Phil Dickens (7th season)
- MVP: Rich Badar
- Captains: Rich Badar; Mel Branch
- Home stadium: Seventeenth Street Stadium

1964 Big Ten Conference football standings
| | Conf. | | | | | Overall |
| Team | W | | L | | T | W | | L | | T |
|---|---|---|---|---|---|---|---|---|---|---|
| No. 4 Michigan $ | 6 | – | 1 | – | 0 | 9 | – | 1 | – | 0 |
| No. 9 Ohio State | 5 | – | 1 | – | 0 | 7 | – | 2 | – | 0 |
| Purdue | 5 | – | 2 | – | 0 | 6 | – | 3 | – | 0 |
| Illinois | 4 | – | 3 | – | 0 | 6 | – | 3 | – | 0 |
| Minnesota | 4 | – | 3 | – | 0 | 5 | – | 4 | – | 0 |
| Michigan State | 3 | – | 3 | – | 0 | 4 | – | 5 | – | 0 |
| Northwestern | 2 | – | 5 | – | 0 | 3 | – | 6 | – | 0 |
| Wisconsin | 2 | – | 5 | – | 0 | 3 | – | 6 | – | 0 |
| Iowa | 1 | – | 5 | – | 0 | 3 | – | 6 | – | 0 |
| Indiana | 1 | – | 5 | – | 0 | 2 | – | 7 | – | 0 |
$ – Conference champion; Rankings from AP Poll

The 1964 Indiana Hoosiers football team represented the Indiana Hoosiers in the 1964 Big Ten Conference football season. The Hoosiers played their home games at Seventeenth Street Stadium in Bloomington, Indiana. The team was coached by Phil Dickens, in his seventh and final year as head coach of the Hoosiers.

== Schedule ==
| Date | Opponent | Site | Result | Attendance | Source |
|---|---|---|---|---|---|
| September 26 | Northwestern | Seventeenth Street Stadium; Bloomington, IN | L 13–14 | 30,737 | |
| October 3 | at No. 5 Ohio State | Ohio Stadium; Columbus, OH | L 9–17 | 81,834 | |
| October 10 | Iowa | Seventeenth Street Stadium; Bloomington, IN | L 20–21 | 31,108 | |
| October 17 | Michigan State | Seventeenth Street Stadium; Bloomington, IN (rivalry) | W 27–20 | 38,257 | |
| October 23 | at Miami (FL)* | Miami Orange Bowl; Miami, FL | W 28–14 | 33,567 | |
| October 31 | Minnesota^{†} | Seventeenth Street Stadium; Bloomington, IN | L 0–21 | 33,245 | |
| November 7 | at Oregon State* | Parker Stadium; Corvallis, OR | L 14–24 | 20,389 | |
| November 14 | Oregon* | Seventeenth Street Stadium; Bloomington, IN | L 21–29 | 20,078 | |
| November 21 | at Purdue | Ross–Ade Stadium; West Lafayette, IN (Old Oaken Bucket) | L 22–28 | 59,932 | |
*Non-conference game; ^{†}Homecoming; Rankings from AP Poll released prior to the game; Source:

== 1965 NFL draftees ==
| Player | Position | Round | Pick | NFL club |
| Tom Nowatzke | Fullback | 1 | 11 | Detroit Lions |
| Don Croftcheck | Guard | 8 | 105 | Washington Redskins |
