= 1964 Michigan State Spartans football team =

American college football season

1964 Michigan State Spartans football
- Conference: Big Ten Conference

Ranking
- Coaches: No. 20
- Record: 4–5 (3–3 Big Ten)
- Head coach: Duffy Daugherty (11th season)
- MVP: Dick Gordon
- Captain: Charles Migyanka
- Home stadium: Spartan Stadium

1964 Big Ten Conference football standings
	Conf.					Overall
Team	W		L		T	W		L		T
No. 4 Michigan $	6	–	1	–	0	9	–	1	–	0
No. 9 Ohio State	5	–	1	–	0	7	–	2	–	0
Purdue	5	–	2	–	0	6	–	3	–	0
Illinois	4	–	3	–	0	6	–	3	–	0
Minnesota	4	–	3	–	0	5	–	4	–	0
Michigan State	3	–	3	–	0	4	–	5	–	0
Northwestern	2	–	5	–	0	3	–	6	–	0
Wisconsin	2	–	5	–	0	3	–	6	–	0
Iowa	1	–	5	–	0	3	–	6	–	0
Indiana	1	–	5	–	0	2	–	7	–	0
$ – Conference champion; Rankings from AP Poll

The 1964 Michigan State Spartans football team represented Michigan State University in the 1964 Big Ten Conference football season. In their 11th season under head coach Duffy Daugherty, the Spartans compiled a 4–5 overall record 3–3 against Big Ten opponents) and finished in sixth place in the Big Ten Conference.

Two Spartans were selected as first-team players on the 1964 All-Big Ten Conference football team. Halfback Dick Gordon received first-team honors from the Associated Press (AP) and United Press International (UPI), and tackle Jerry Rush received first-team honors from the AP. Rush was also selected as a second-team All-American by the AP.

== Schedule ==
Date	Opponent	Rank	Site	Result	Attendance	Source
September 26	at North Carolina*		Kenan Memorial Stadium; Chapel Hill, NC	L 15–21	40,500	
October 3	No. 2 USC*		Spartan Stadium; East Lansing, MI	W 17–7	70,102	
October 10	No. 7 Michigan	No. 9	Spartan Stadium; East Lansing, MI (rivalry)	L 10–17	78,234	
October 17	at Indiana		Seventeenth Street Football Stadium; Bloomington, IN (rivalry)	L 20–27	38,257	
October 24	Northwestern^{†}		Spartan Stadium; East Lansing, MI	W 24–6	66,311	
October 31	at Wisconsin		Camp Randall Stadium; Madison, WI	W 22–6	65,728	
November 7	No. 10 Purdue		Spartan Stadium; East Lansing, MI	W 21–7	75,433	
November 14	at No. 1 Notre Dame*		Notre Dame Stadium; Notre Dame, IN (Megaphone Trophy)	L 7–34	59,265	
November 21	at Illinois		Memorial Stadium; Champaign, IL	L 0–16	32,000	
*Non-conference game; ^{†}Homecoming; Rankings from AP Poll released prior to the game; Source:

== Game summaries ==
=== Michigan ===
Week 3: Michigan at Michigan State

Team	1	2	3	4	Total
• Michigan (2–0)	0	3	0	14	17
Mich. St. (1–1)	7	0	0	3	10

- Date: October 3, 1964
- Location: Spartan Stadium
  East Lansing, MI
- Game attendance: 78,234

Coming into the game, Michigan had lost six straight games to the Spartans and had not defeated them since 1955. The game matched two teams ranked in the Top 10 in the AP Poll and attracted "the largest crowd ever assembled at Spartan Stadium" up to that time. Writing in The New York Times, R. W. Apple, Jr., wrote that the intrastate rivalry "means to the people of Michigan what the struggle between the Capulets and Montagues did to the citizens of 15th-century Verona."

Michigan State scored its only touchdown in the first quarter after recovering a fumble recovery off an errant pitch from Timberlake to Anthony. Another highlight for Michigan State came when sophomore receiver Gene Washington impressed observers with "a spectacular leaping grab for 43 yards."

Trailed 10 to 3 halfway through the fourth quarter, Michigan scored 14 points in the final seven minutes on a comeback led by sophomore halfback Rick Sygar. With seven minutes remaining, Sygar caught a five-yard touchdown pass from Timberlake. On the final drive, he took a pitch from Timberlake at the Michigan State 31-yard line and threw a touchdown pass to John Henderson. Having missed a two-point conversion attempt on the first Michigan touchdown, Timberlake threw to Steve Smith for the two-point conversion on the final score. Michigan defeated the Spartans 17–10. Mel Anthony rushed for 70 yards on 21 carries, and John Henderson had 82 receiving yards on three catches.
