= 1964 Wisconsin Badgers football team =

American college football season

1964 Wisconsin Badgers football
- Conference: Big Ten Conference
- Record: 3–6 (2–5 Big Ten)
- Head coach: Milt Bruhn (9th season)
- MVP: Carl Silvestri
- Captains: Ron Frain; Ron Leafblad
- Home stadium: Camp Randall Stadium

1964 Big Ten Conference football standings
	Conf.					Overall
Team	W		L		T	W		L		T
No. 4 Michigan $	6	–	1	–	0	9	–	1	–	0
No. 9 Ohio State	5	–	1	–	0	7	–	2	–	0
Purdue	5	–	2	–	0	6	–	3	–	0
Illinois	4	–	3	–	0	6	–	3	–	0
Minnesota	4	–	3	–	0	5	–	4	–	0
Michigan State	3	–	3	–	0	4	–	5	–	0
Northwestern	2	–	5	–	0	3	–	6	–	0
Wisconsin	2	–	5	–	0	3	–	6	–	0
Iowa	1	–	5	–	0	3	–	6	–	0
Indiana	1	–	5	–	0	2	–	7	–	0
$ – Conference champion; Rankings from AP Poll

The 1964 Wisconsin Badgers football team was an American football team that represented the University of Wisconsin as a member of the Big Ten Conference during the 1964 Big Ten season. In their ninth year under head coach Milt Bruhn, the Badgers compiled a 2–7–1 record (2–5 in conference games), tied for seventh place in the Big Ten, and were outscored by a total of 190 to 98.

The Badgers gained an average of 138.1 passing yards and 150.8 rushing yards per game. On defense, they gave up an average of 127.9 passing yards and 196.8 rushing yards per game. The team's individual statistical leaders included: quarterback Hal Brandt (1,059 passing yards); running back Ron Smith (439 rushing yards); and wide receiver Jimmy Jones (34 receptions for 529 yards).

Linebacker Carl Silvestri was selected as the team's most valuable player. Ron Frain and Ron Leafblad were the team captains. Two Wisconsin players received first- or second-team honors from the Associated Press (AP) or United Press International (UPI) on the 1964 All-Big Ten Conference football team: Ron Smith at halfback (UPI-2); and Jimmy Jones at end (UPI-2).

The Badgers played their home games at Camp Randall Stadium in Madison, Wisconsin.

== Schedule ==
Date	Opponent	Site	Result	Attendance	Source
September 19	Kansas State*	Camp Randall Stadium; Madison, WI	W 17–7	46,455	
September 26	Notre Dame*	Camp Randall Stadium; Madison, WI	L 7–31	64,398	
October 10	at Purdue	Ross–Ade Stadium; West Lafayette, IN	L 7–28	44,396	
October 17	Iowa	Camp Randall Stadium; Madison, WI (rivalry)	W 31–21	65,713	
October 24	at No. 1 Ohio State	Ohio Stadium; Columbus, OH	L 3–28	84,365	
October 31	Michigan State^{†}	Camp Randall Stadium; Madison, WI	L 6–22	65,728	
November 7	at Northwestern	Dyche Stadium; Evanston, IL	L 13–17	51,028	
November 14	at Illinois	Memorial Stadium; Champaign, IL	L 0–29	55,077	
November 21	Minnesota	Camp Randall Stadium; Madison, WI (rivalry)	W 14–7	61,306	
*Non-conference game; ^{†}Homecoming; Rankings from AP Poll released prior to the game; Source:

== Personnel ==
1964 Wisconsin Badgers football team roster
Players
Coaches
Offense

Pos.	#	Name	Class
QB		Harold Brandt
		Jimmy Jones

Defense

Pos.	#	Name	Class

Special teams

Pos.	#	Name	Class

Head coach

- Milt Bruhn

Coordinators/assistant coaches

Legend

- (C) Team captain
- (S) Suspended
- (I) Ineligible
- Injured
- Redshirt

== 1965 NFL draft ==
Player	Position	Round	Pick	NFL club
Roger Jacobazzi	Tackle	7	86	Green Bay Packers
Al Piraino	Tackle	8	104	Philadelphia Eagles
Carl Silvestri	Back	16	222	St. Louis Cardinals
Rick Reichardt	Running Back	17	238	Baltimore Colts
Ralph Kurek	Running Back	20	269	Chicago Bears

== 1965 AFL Draft ==
Player	Position	Round	Pick	AFL club
Jon Hohman	Guard	8	57	Denver Broncos
Al Piraino	Tackle	11	85	Kansas City Chiefs
