= 1964 Iowa Hawkeyes football team =

American college football season

1964 Iowa Hawkeyes football
- Conference: Big Ten Conference
- Record: 3–6 (1–5 Big Ten)
- Head coach: Jerry Burns (4th season)
- MVP: Karl Noonan
- Captain: Tony Giacobazzi
- Home stadium: Iowa Stadium

1964 Big Ten Conference football standings
	Conf.					Overall
Team	W		L		T	W		L		T
No. 4 Michigan $	6	–	1	–	0	9	–	1	–	0
No. 9 Ohio State	5	–	1	–	0	7	–	2	–	0
Purdue	5	–	2	–	0	6	–	3	–	0
Illinois	4	–	3	–	0	6	–	3	–	0
Minnesota	4	–	3	–	0	5	–	4	–	0
Michigan State	3	–	3	–	0	4	–	5	–	0
Northwestern	2	–	5	–	0	3	–	6	–	0
Wisconsin	2	–	5	–	0	3	–	6	–	0
Iowa	1	–	5	–	0	3	–	6	–	0
Indiana	1	–	5	–	0	2	–	7	–	0
$ – Conference champion; Rankings from AP Poll

The 1964 Iowa Hawkeyes football team was an American football team that represented the University of Iowa as a member of the Big Ten Conference during the 1964 Big Ten football season. In their fourth year under head coach Jerry Burns, the Hawkeyes compiled a 3–6 record (1–5 in conference game), tied for last place in the Big Ten, and were outscored by a total of 209 to 170.

The 1964 Hawkeyes gained 736 rushing yards and 2,125 passing yards. On defense, they gave up 1,663 rushing yards and 1,154 passing yards. The Hawkeyes' average of 236.1 passing yards per game set a new school record, since broken.

The team's statistical leaders included quarterback Gary Snook (151-of-311 passing, 2,062 yards), Dalton Kimble (284 rushing yards, 48 points scored), and end Karl Noonan (59 receptions for 933 yards). Snook broke Big Ten records for passing yards, and Noonan broke the conference mark for receptions. Noonan was selected by the Newspaper Enterprise Association and Football News as a first-team All-American. Noonan and Snook received first-team All-Big Ten honors. Noonan was also selected as the team's most valuable player. End Tony Giacobazzi was the team captain.

The team played its home games at Iowa Stadium in Iowa City, Iowa. Home attendance totaled 266,391, an average of 53,278 per game.

== Schedule ==
Date	Opponent	Site	TV	Result	Attendance	Source
September 26	Idaho*	Iowa Stadium; Iowa City, IA		W 34–24	43,300	
October 3	No. 10 Washington*	Iowa Stadium; Iowa City, IA	NBC	W 28–18	48,000	
October 10	at Indiana	Seventeenth Street Stadium; Bloomington, IN		W 21–20	31,108	
October 17	at Wisconsin	Camp Randall Stadium; Madison, WI (rivalry)		L 21–31	65,713	
October 24	Purdue^{†}	Iowa Stadium; Iowa City, IA		L 14–19	59,600	
October 31	No. 1 Ohio State	Iowa Stadium; Iowa City, IA		L 19–21	58,700	
November 7	at Minnesota	Memorial Stadium; Minneapolis, MN (rivalry)		L 13–14	63,350	
November 14	No. 6 Michigan	Iowa Stadium; Iowa City, IA		L 20–34	56,791	
November 21	at No. 1 Notre Dame*	Notre Dame Stadium; Notre Dame, IN		L 0–28	59,135	
*Non-conference game; ^{†}Homecoming; Rankings from AP Poll released prior to the game; Source:
