= 1964 Purdue Boilermakers football team =

American college football season

1964 Purdue Boilermakers football
- Conference: Big Ten Conference
- Record: 6–3 (5–2 Big Ten)
- Head coach: Jack Mollenkopf (9th season)
- MVP: Bob Hadrick
- Captains: Ed Flanagan; Jim Garcia; Harold Wells
- Home stadium: Ross–Ade Stadium

1964 Big Ten Conference football standings
	Conf.					Overall
Team	W		L		T	W		L		T
No. 4 Michigan $	6	–	1	–	0	9	–	1	–	0
No. 9 Ohio State	5	–	1	–	0	7	–	2	–	0
Purdue	5	–	2	–	0	6	–	3	–	0
Illinois	4	–	3	–	0	6	–	3	–	0
Minnesota	4	–	3	–	0	5	–	4	–	0
Michigan State	3	–	3	–	0	4	–	5	–	0
Northwestern	2	–	5	–	0	3	–	6	–	0
Wisconsin	2	–	5	–	0	3	–	6	–	0
Iowa	1	–	5	–	0	3	–	6	–	0
Indiana	1	–	5	–	0	2	–	7	–	0
$ – Conference champion; Rankings from AP Poll

The 1964 Purdue Boilermakers football team was an American football team that represented Purdue University during the 1964 Big Ten Conference football season. In their ninth season under head coach Jack Mollenkopf, the Boilermakers compiled a 6–3 record, finished in third place in the Big Ten Conference with a 5–2 record against conference opponents, and outscored all opponents by a combined total of 168 to 146.

The team's statistical leaders included quarterback Bob Griese with 934 passing yards, running back Gordon Teter with 614 rushing yards, offensive end Bob Hadrick with 441 receiving yards, and fullback Randy Minniear with 54 points scored.

Defensive end Harold Wells was selected by the Associated Press (AP) as a first-team player on the 1964 All-America team. Six Purdue players were selected by either the AP or United Press International (UPI) for their 1964 All-Big Ten Conference football teams: Harold Wells (AP-1, UPI-1); defensive tackle Jim Garcia (AP-1, UPI-1); Bob Hadrick (UPI-1); center Ed Flanagan (UPI-2); offensive tackle Karl Singer (UPI-2); and defensive tackle Jerry Shay (UPI-2).

== Schedule ==
Date	Opponent	Rank	Site	Result	Attendance	Source
September 26	Ohio*		Ross–Ade Stadium; West Lafayette, IN	W 17–0	45,321	
October 3	at No. 9 Notre Dame*		Notre Dame Stadium; Notre Dame, IN (rivalry)	L 15–34	59,611	
October 10	Wisconsin		Ross–Ade Stadium; West Lafayette, IN	W 28–7	44,396	
October 17	at No. 5 Michigan		Michigan Stadium; Ann Arbor, MI	W 21–20	60,924	
October 24	at Iowa		Iowa Stadium; Iowa City, IA	W 19–14	59,600	
October 31	Illinois^{†}		Ross–Ade Stadium; West Lafayette, IN (rivalry)	W 26–14	59,425	
November 7	at Michigan State	No. 10	Spartan Stadium; East Lansing, MI	L 7–21	75,433	
November 14	at Minnesota		Memorial Stadium; Minneapolis, MN	L 7–14	50,255	
November 21	Indiana		Ross–Ade Stadium; West Lafayette, IN (Old Oaken Bucket)	W 28–22	59,932	
*Non-conference game; ^{†}Homecoming; Rankings from AP Poll released prior to the game

== Roster ==
1964 Purdue Boilermakers football team roster
Players
Coaches
Offense

Pos.	#	Name	Class
OL		Sal Ciampi
QB	12	Bob Griese
OL		Lou DeFilippo
OL		Ed Flanagan
WR		Bob Hadrick
RB		Bill Harmon
QB		Doug Holcomb
OL		Bob Hopp
RB		John Kuzniewski
WR		Sam Longmire
RB		Randy Minniear
WR		Jim Morel
TE		Dennis Pabich
OL		George Pappas
TE		Bill Roach
TE		Rich Ruble
RB		Lou Sims
OL		Karl Singer
TE		Ed Snitger
RB		Gordon Teter

Defense

Pos.	#	Name	Class
DL		Jack Calcaterra
DB		George Catavolos
DB		John Charles
LB		Pat Conley
DB		Ken Eby
DL		Jim Garcia
LB		Bill Howard
DB		Charles King
DL		Jim Long
DL		Jerry Shay
DL		Harold Wells

Special teams

Pos.	#	Name	Class

Head coach

- Jack Mollenkopf

Coordinators/assistant coaches

- Bob DeMoss
- John Jardine
- Len Jardine
- Ned Maloney

Legend

- (C) Team captain
- (S) Suspended
- (I) Ineligible
- Injured
- Redshirt

== Game summaries ==
=== Iowa ===
- Gordon Teter 29 rushes, 132 yards

=== Indiana ===
- Gordon Teter 31 rushes, 126 yards
