= 1964 Ohio State Buckeyes football team =

American college football season

1964 Ohio State Buckeyes football
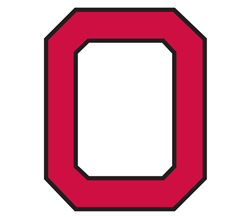
- Conference: Big Ten Conference

Ranking
- Coaches: No. 9
- AP: No. 9
- Record: 7–2 (5–1 Big Ten)
- Head coach: Woody Hayes (14th season)
- MVP: Ed Orazen
- Captains: Jim Davidson; Tom Kiehfuss; Bill Spahr
- Home stadium: Ohio Stadium

1964 Big Ten Conference football standings
	Conf.					Overall
Team	W		L		T	W		L		T
No. 4 Michigan $	6	–	1	–	0	9	–	1	–	0
No. 9 Ohio State	5	–	1	–	0	7	–	2	–	0
Purdue	5	–	2	–	0	6	–	3	–	0
Illinois	4	–	3	–	0	6	–	3	–	0
Minnesota	4	–	3	–	0	5	–	4	–	0
Michigan State	3	–	3	–	0	4	–	5	–	0
Northwestern	2	–	5	–	0	3	–	6	–	0
Wisconsin	2	–	5	–	0	3	–	6	–	0
Iowa	1	–	5	–	0	3	–	6	–	0
Indiana	1	–	5	–	0	2	–	7	–	0
$ – Conference champion; Rankings from AP Poll

The 1964 Ohio State Buckeyes football team was an American football team that represented the Ohio State University as a member of the Big Ten Conference during the 1964 Big Ten season. In their 14th year under head coach Woody Hayes, the Buckeyes compiled a 7–2 record (5–1 in conference games), finished second in the Big Ten, and outscored opponents by a total of 146 to 76.

The team's statistical leaders included quarterback Don Unverferth (871 passing yards, 45.6 completion percentage), Willard Sander (626 rushing yards, 4.3 yards per carry), and Bo Rein (28 receptions for 281 yards). Six Ohio State players received first-team honors on the 1964 All-Big Ten Conference football team: offensive guard Dan Porretta (AP-1, UPI-1); linebacker Ike Kelley (AP-1, UPI-1); defensive back Arnie Chonko (AP-1, UPI-1); offensive tackle Jim Davidson (UPI-1); defensive end Bill Spahr (UPI-1); and linebacker Tom Bugel (UPI-1).

The team played its home games at Ohio Stadium in Columbus, Ohio

== Schedule ==
Date	Time	Opponent	Rank	Site	Result	Attendance	Source
September 26	1:30 p.m.	SMU*	No. 5	Ohio Stadium; Columbus, OH	W 27–8	80,737	
October 3	1:30 p.m.	Indiana	No. 5	Ohio Stadium; Columbus, OH	W 17–9	81,834	
October 10	2:00 p.m.	at No. 2 Illinois	No. 4	Memorial Stadium; Champaign, IL (Illibuck)	W 26–0	71,227	
October 17	1:30 p.m.	USC*	No. 2	Ohio Stadium; Columbus, OH	W 17–0	84,315	
October 24	1:30 p.m.	Wisconsin	No. 1	Ohio Stadium; Columbus, OH	W 28–3	84,365	
October 31	2:30 p.m.	at Iowa	No. 1	Iowa Stadium; Iowa City, IA	W 21–19	58,700	
November 7	1:30 p.m.	Penn State*	No. 2	Ohio Stadium; Columbus, OH (rivalry)	L 0–27	84,279	
November 14	1:30 p.m.	Northwestern	No. 7	Ohio Stadium; Columbus, OH	W 10–0	83,525	
November 21	1:30 p.m.	No. 6 Michigan	No. 7	Ohio Stadium; Columbus, OH (rivalry)	L 0–10	84,685	
*Non-conference game; Rankings from AP Poll released prior to the game; All times are in Eastern time

== Game summaries ==
=== SMU ===
Team	1	2	3	4	Total
Southern Methodist	0	0	0	8	8
• Ohio State	10	3	7	7	27

- Date: September 26
- Location: Ohio Stadium
- Game attendance: 80,737
- Game weather: Clear, wind SW 12-20 mph, 80 °F (27 °C)

Scoring summary
Q1	6:54	OSU	Funk 39 yard field goal	OSU 3–0
Q1	0:10	OSU	Barrington 37 yard run (Funk kick)	OSU 10–0
Q2	12:19	OSU	Funk 28 yard field goal	OSU 13–0
Q3	13:56	OSU	Spahr 31 yard interception/fumble recovery (Funk kick)	OSU 20–0
Q4	14:18	OSU	Sander 42 yard run (Funk kick)	OSU 27–0
Q4	0:25	SMU	Oefinger 12 yard pass to Taylor (Oefinger rush)	OSU 27–8

=== Indiana ===
Team	1	2	3	4	Total
Indiana	3	0	0	6	9
• Ohio State	0	10	7	0	17

- Date: October 3
- Location: Ohio Stadium
- Game attendance: 81,834
- Game weather: Clear, wind SSW 9 mph (gusts to 15 mph), 67 °F (19 °C)

Scoring summary
Q1	5:58	IND	Nowatzke 50 yard field goal	IND 0–3
Q2	3:44	OSU	Unverferth 24 yard pass to Stock (Funk kick)	OSU 7–3
Q2	0:24	OSU	Funk 25 yard field goal	OSU 10–3
Q3	1:25	OSU	Rein 3 yard run (Funk kick)	OSU 17–3
Q4	8:04	IND	Badar 5 yard pass to Kuechenberg (pass intercepted)	OSU 17–9

=== Illinois ===
Team	1	2	3	4	Total
• Ohio State	6	10	7	3	26
Illinois	0	0	0	0	0

- Date: October 10
- Location: Memorial Stadium, Champaign, Illinois
- Game attendance: 71,227
- Game weather: Clear, calm, 48 °F (9 °C)

Scoring summary
Q1	10:55	OSU	Unverferth 24 yard run (kick failed)	OSU 6–0
Q2	8:00	OSU	Sander 1 yard run (Funk kick)	OSU 13–0
Q2	3:25	OSU	Funk 29 yard field goal	OSU 16–0
Q3	7:15	OSU	Sander 4 yard run (Funk kick)	OSU 23–0
Q4	13:35	OSU	Funk 28 yard field goal	OSU 26–0

=== USC ===
Team	1	2	3	4	Total
USC	0	0	0	0	0
• Ohio St	7	7	0	3	17

- Date: October 17
- Location: Ohio Stadium
- Game attendance: 84,315
- Game weather: Clear, wind N 10 mph, 76 °F (24 °C)

Scoring summary
Q1	8:12	OHST	Sander 2 yard run (Funk kick)	Ohio St 7-0
Q2	1:03	OHST	Lashtuka 10 yard pass from Unverferth (Funk kick)	Ohio St 14-0
Q4	6:40	OHST	Funk 24 yard field goal	Ohio St 17-0

=== Wisconsin ===
Team	1	2	3	4	Total
Wisconsin	0	0	3	0	3
• Ohio State	14	0	0	14	28

- Date: October 24
- Location: Ohio Stadium
- Game attendance: 84,365
- Game weather: Clear, wind SW 12 mph, 55 °F (13 °C)

Scoring summary
Q1	9:23	OSU	Rein 6 yard run (Funk kick)	OSU 7–0
Q1	3:51	OSU	Sander 1 yard run (Funk kick)	OSU 14–0
Q3	9:47	WIS	Kaye 28 yard field goal	OSU 14–3
Q4	7:37	OSU	Sander 1 yard run (Funk kick)	OSU 21–3
Q4	5:49	OSU	Unverferth 9 yard pass to Lindsey (Funk kick)	OSU 28–3

=== Iowa ===
Team	1	2	3	4	Total
• Ohio State	7	7	7	0	21
Iowa	7	6	0	6	19

- Date: October 31
- Location: Iowa Stadium, Iowa City, Iowa
- Game attendance: 58,700
- Game weather: Clear, wind SSW 15 mph, 65 °F (18 °C)

Scoring summary
Q1	14:19	OSU	Dreffer 36 yard interception return (Funk kick)	OSU 0–7
Q1	5:28	IOWA	Snook 1 yard run (Simpson kick)	TIED 7–7
Q2	6:41	OSU	Unverferth 2 yard run (Funk kick)	OSU 7–14
Q2	0:57	IOWA	Snook 30 yard pass to Noonan (kick failed)	OSU 13-14
Q3	14:39	OSU	Unverferth 23 yard pass to Rein (Funk kick)	OSU 13–21
Q4	0:02	IOWA	Nourse 1 yard run (run failed)	OSU 19–21

=== Penn State ===
Team	1	2	3	4	Total
• Penn State	7	7	6	7	27
Ohio State	0	0	0	0	0

- Date: November 7
- Location: Ohio Stadium
- Game weather: Cloudy, 60 °F (16 °C)

Scoring summary
Q1	6:36	PSU	Nye recovered fumble in end zone (Sanker kick)	PSU 0–7
Q2	8:06	PSU	Wydman 3 yard run (Sanker kick)	PSU 0–14
Q3	0:52	PSU	Kunit 2 yard run (Sanker kick)	PSU 0–20
Q4	4:34	PSU	Kunit 5 yard run (Sanker kick)	PSU 0–27

=== Northwestern ===
Team	1	2	3	4	Total
Northwestern	0	0	0	0	0
• Ohio State	7	3	0	0	10

- Date: November 14
- Location: Ohio Stadium
- Game weather: Clear, wind SE 14 mph, 60 °F (16 °C)

Scoring summary
Q1	5:03	OSU	Sander 5 yard run (Funk kick)	OSU 7–0
Q2	2:47	OSU	Funk 27 yard field goal	OSU 10–0

=== Michigan ===
Team	1	2	3	4	Total
• Michigan	0	7	0	3	10
Ohio State	0	0	0	0	0

- Date: November 21
- Location: Ohio Stadium
- Game attendance: 84,685
- Game weather: Clear, wind W 18 mph, 20 °F (−7 °C)

Scoring summary
Q2	0:44	UM	Timberlake 17 yard pass to Detwiler (Evassheski kick)	UM 0–7
Q4	14:52	UM	Timberlake 27 yard kick	UM 0–10

== Coaching staff ==
- Woody Hayes – Head coach – 14th year

== 1965 pro draftees ==
Player	Draft	Round	Pick	Position	NFL club
Jim Davidson	AFL	1	8	Tackle	Buffalo Bills
Bo Scott	NFL	3	32	Running back	Cleveland Browns
Bo Scott	AFL	20	155	Running back	Oakland Raiders
Ed Orazen	NFL	19	265	Guard	Cleveland Browns
