= 1964 Washington State Cougars football team =

American college football season

1964 Washington State Cougars football
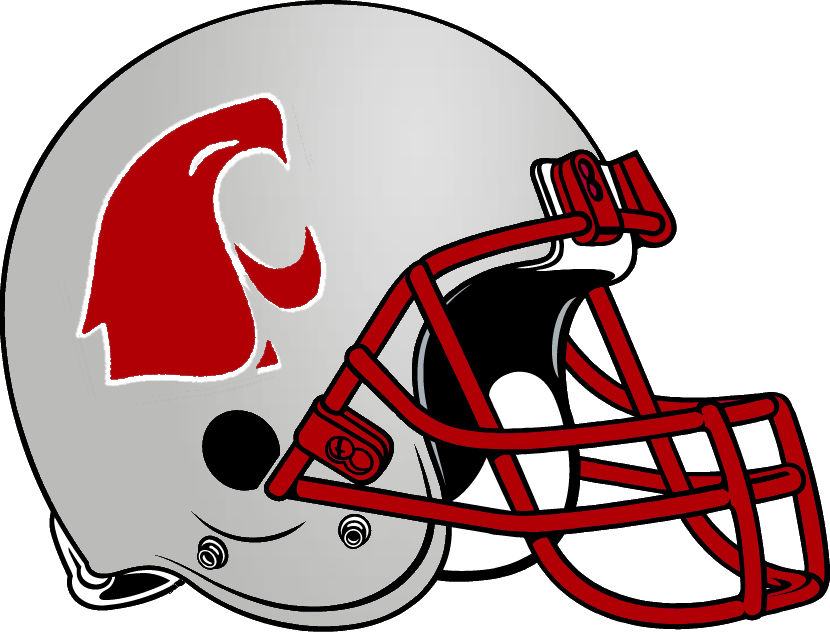
- Conference: Athletic Association of Western Universities
- Record: 3–6–1 (1–2–1 AAWU)
- Head coach: Bert Clark (1st season)
- Captains: Jim Paton; Dave Thomas
- Home stadium: Rogers Field, Joe Albi Stadium

1964 Athletic Association of Western Universities football standings
	Conf.					Overall
Team	W		L		T	W		L		T
No. 8 Oregon State ^ +	3	–	1	–	0	8	–	3	–	0
No. 10 USC +	3	–	1	–	0	7	–	3	–	0
Washington	5	–	2	–	0	6	–	4	–	0
UCLA	2	–	2	–	0	4	–	6	–	0
Stanford	3	–	4	–	0	5	–	5	–	0
Oregon	1	–	2	–	1	7	–	2	–	1
Washington State	1	–	2	–	1	3	–	6	–	1
California	0	–	4	–	0	3	–	7	–	0
+ – Conference co-champions; ^ – Rose Bowl representative determined by longest absence, due to no head-to-head result and 4–4 tie in member vote.; Rankings from AP Poll

The 1964 Washington State Cougars football team was an American football team that represented Washington State University in the Athletic Association of Western Universities (AAWU) during the 1964 NCAA University Division football season. In their first season under head coach Bert Clark, the Cougars compiled a 3–6–1 record (1–2–1 in AAWU, tie for sixth), and were outscored 208 to 165.

The team's statistical leaders included Dave Petersen with 478 passing yards, Clancy Williams with 783 rushing yards, and Tom Kelley with 218 receiving yards. Williams was the ninth overall pick of the 1965 NFL draft, selected in the first round by the Los Angeles Rams.

Hired in January, Clark was previously an assistant at rival Washington for seven seasons under head coach Jim Owens; both had played collegiately at Oklahoma under hall of fame head coach Bud Wilkinson. Clark's initial contract at WSU was for three years at $16,500 per year.

== Schedule ==
Date	Opponent	Site	Result	Attendance	Source
September 19	Stanford	Joe Albi Stadium; Spokane, WA	W 29–23	20,500	
September 26	Wyoming*	Rogers Field; Pullman, WA	L 7–28	17,500	
October 3	at Arizona*	Arizona Stadium; Tucson, AZ	L 12–28	29,400	
October 10	Pacific (CA)*	Rogers Field; Pullman, WA	W 50–0	13,000	
October 17	at San Jose State*	Spartan Stadium; San Jose, CA	W 16–14	17,778	
October 24	at Idaho*	Neale Stadium; Moscow, ID (Battle of the Palouse)	L 13–28	18,600	
October 31	Oregon State^{†}	Rogers Field; Pullman, WA	L 7–24	16,000	
November 7	at Oregon	Hayward Field; Eugene, OR	T 21–21	19,000	
November 14	at Texas Tech*	Jones Stadium; Lubbock, TX	L 10–28	25,500	
November 21	Washington	Joe Albi Stadium; Spokane, WA (Apple Cup)	L 0–14	35,600	
*Non-conference game; ^{†}Homecoming; Source:

== Game summaries ==
=== Stanford ===
Team	1	2	3	4	Total
Stanford	10	3	7	3	23
• Washington St	3	13	0	13	29

- Date: September 19
- Location: Joe Albi Stadium, Spokane, WA
- Game attendance: 20,500

Scoring summary
1		WSU	Hedemark 20-yard field goal	WSU 3-0
1		STAN	Beck 52-yard field goal	Tied 3-3
1		STAN	Myers 1-yard run (Beck kick)	STAN 10-3
2		WSU	Roth 49-yard run (Hedemark kick)	Tied 10-10
2		STAN	Beck 27-yard field goal	STAN 13-10
2		WSU	Gaskins 7-yard run (kick failed)	WSU 16-13
3		STAN	DeSylvia 8-yard run (Beck kick)	STAN 20-16
4		STAN	Beck 22-yard field goal	STAN 23-16
4		WSU	Eilmes 1-yard run (run failed)	STAN 23-22
4	0:25	WSU	Roth 1-yard run (Ebel kick)	WSU 29-23

== Roster ==
1964 Washington State Cougars football team roster
Players
Coaches
Offense

Pos.	#	Name	Class
OT	71	Brian Beveridge	Jr
OT	72	Joe Broeker	Sr
HB	10	Mike Cadigan	So
G	66	Wally Dempsey	Sr
FB	33	Larry Eilmes	Jr
G	68	Wayne Foster	Jr
HB	20	Bill Gaskins	Jr
SE	83	Tom Kelley	Jr
G	65	Jim Nelson	Jr
OT	77	Jim Paton	Sr
QB	15	Dave Petersen	So
QB	11	Tom Roth	Jr
TE	88	Rich Sheron	So
OT	74	Bob Trygstad	So
C	62	Ron Vrlicak	So
HB	22	Clancy Williams	Sr

Defense

Pos.	#	Name	Class

Special teams

Pos.	#	Name	Class
K	75	Bill Ebel	Sr
P	83	Tom Kelley	Jr

Head coach

- Bert Clark (1st year)

Coordinators/assistant coaches

- Laurie Niemi (OL)
- King Block (DL)
- Red Smith (E, freshmen)
- Joe Marvin (OB)
- Jim Shanley (DB)
- John Nelson (OL)

Legend

- (C) Team captain
- (S) Suspended
- (I) Ineligible
- Injured
- Redshirt

== NFL draft ==
Two Cougars were selected in the 1965 NFL draft.

Player	Position	Round	Overall	Franchise
Clancy Williams	Running back	1	9	Los Angeles Rams
Dale Ford	Running back	19	254	San Francisco 49ers
