= 1964 Stanford Indians football team =

American college football season

1964 Stanford Indians football
- Conference: Athletic Association of Western Universities
- Record: 5–5 (3–4 AAWU)
- Head coach: John Ralston (2nd season)
- Home stadium: Stanford Stadium

1964 Athletic Association of Western Universities football standings
	Conf.					Overall
Team	W		L		T	W		L		T
No. 8 Oregon State ^ +	3	–	1	–	0	8	–	3	–	0
No. 10 USC +	3	–	1	–	0	7	–	3	–	0
Washington	5	–	2	–	0	6	–	4	–	0
UCLA	2	–	2	–	0	4	–	6	–	0
Stanford	3	–	4	–	0	5	–	5	–	0
Oregon	1	–	2	–	1	7	–	2	–	1
Washington State	1	–	2	–	1	3	–	6	–	1
California	0	–	4	–	0	3	–	7	–	0
+ – Conference co-champions; ^ – Rose Bowl representative determined by longest absence, due to no head-to-head result and 4–4 tie in member vote.; Rankings from AP Poll

The 1964 Stanford Indians football team represented Stanford University during the 1964 NCAA University Division football season. They were coached by John Ralston in his second season, and played their home games at Stanford Stadium in Stanford, California. Despite a generally mediocre season, the Indians dealt undefeated, No. 7 Oregon its first loss and also beat No.8 and Rose Bowl-bound Oregon State two weeks later.

== Schedule ==
Date	Time	Opponent	Site	Result	Attendance	Source
September 19		at Washington State	Joe Albi Stadium; Spokane, WA	L 23–29	20,500	
September 26		San Jose State*	Stanford Stadium; Stanford, CA (rivalry)	W 10–8	27,000	
October 3		at UCLA	Los Angeles Memorial Coliseum; Los Angeles, CA	L 20–27	35,970	
October 10		Rice*	Stanford Stadium; Stanford, CA	W 34–7	26,000	
October 17		Washington	Stanford Stadium; Stanford, CA	L 0–6	33,500	
October 24		at No. 2 Notre Dame*	Notre Dame Stadium; Notre Dame, IN (rivalry)	L 6–28	56,721	
October 31	2:00 p.m.	vs. No. 7 Oregon	Multnomah Stadium; Portland, OR	W 10–8	26,800–26,870	
November 7		USC	Stanford Stadium; Stanford, CA (rivalry)	L 10–15	55,000	
November 14		No. 8 Oregon State	Stanford Stadium; Stanford, CA	W 16–7	39,500	
November 21		at California	California Memorial Stadium; Berkeley CA (Big Game)	W 21–3	76,780	
*Non-conference game; Rankings from AP Poll released prior to the game; All times are in Pacific time; Source:

== Players drafted by the NFL/AFL ==
Player	Position	Round	Pick	NFL/AFL Club (Note: AFL Draft selections shown in italics.)
Jack Chapple	Linebacker	3/2	42/13	San Francisco 49ers/Kansas City Chiefs (Note: Signed with San Francisco.)
John Wilbur	Guard	6	45	Kansas City Chiefs
Bob Howard	Guard	18/10	242/77	Pittsburgh Steelers/Kansas City Chiefs
Braden Beck	Kicker	19	150	San Diego Chargers
