= 1964 Northwestern Wildcats football team =

American college football season

1964 Northwestern Wildcats football
- Conference: Big Ten Conference
- Record: 3–6 (2–5 Big Ten)
- Head coach: Alex Agase (1st season)
- MVP: Pat Riley
- Captain: Joe Cerne
- Home stadium: Dyche Stadium

1964 Big Ten Conference football standings
	Conf.					Overall
Team	W		L		T	W		L		T
No. 4 Michigan $	6	–	1	–	0	9	–	1	–	0
No. 9 Ohio State	5	–	1	–	0	7	–	2	–	0
Purdue	5	–	2	–	0	6	–	3	–	0
Illinois	4	–	3	–	0	6	–	3	–	0
Minnesota	4	–	3	–	0	5	–	4	–	0
Michigan State	3	–	3	–	0	4	–	5	–	0
Northwestern	2	–	5	–	0	3	–	6	–	0
Wisconsin	2	–	5	–	0	3	–	6	–	0
Iowa	1	–	5	–	0	3	–	6	–	0
Indiana	1	–	5	–	0	2	–	7	–	0
$ – Conference champion; Rankings from AP Poll

The 1964 Northwestern Wildcats team represented Northwestern University during the 1964 Big Ten Conference football season. In their first year under head coach Alex Agase, the Wildcats compiled a 3–6 record (2–5 against Big Ten Conference opponents) and finished in a tie for seventh place in the Big Ten Conference.

The team's offensive leaders were quarterback Tom Myers with 901 passing yards, Steve Murphy with 377 rushing yards, and Cas Banaszek with 317 receiving yards. Center Joe Cerne was selected as a first-team All-Big Ten player, and as a second-team All-American by the Newspaper Enterprise Association.

== Schedule ==
Date	Opponent	Site	Result	Attendance	Source
September 19	Oregon State*	Dyche Stadium; Evanston, IL	W 7–3	35,805	
September 26	at Indiana	Seventeenth Street Stadium; Bloomington, IL	W 14–13	30,737	
October 3	No. 3 Illinois	Dyche Stadium; Evanston, IL (rivalry)	L 6–17	52,062	
October 10	at Minnesota	Memorial Stadium; Minneapolis, MN	L 18–21	54,275	
October 17	Miami (OH)*	Dyche Stadium; Evanston, IL	L 27–28	41,147	
October 24	at Michigan State	Spartan Stadium; East Lansing, MI	L 6–24	66,311	
October 31	at Michigan	Michigan Stadium; Ann Arbor, MI (rivalry)	L 0–35	54,615	
November 7	Wisconsin	Dyche Stadium; Evanston, IL	W 17–13	51,028	
November 14	at No. 7 Ohio State	Ohio Stadium; Columbus, OH	L 0–10	83,525	
*Non-conference game; Rankings from AP Poll released prior to the game; Source:
