= 1964 Oregon State Beavers football team =

American college football season

1964 Oregon State Beavers football

AAWU co-champion

Rose Bowl, L 7–34 vs. Michigan
- Conference: Athletic Association of Western Universities

Ranking
- Coaches: No. 8
- AP: No. 8
- Record: 8–3 (3–1 AAWU)
- Head coach: Tommy Prothro (10th season)
- Captains: Dick Ruhl; Booker Washington
- Home stadium: Parker Stadium; Multnomah Stadium

1964 Athletic Association of Western Universities football standings
	Conf.					Overall
Team	W		L		T	W		L		T
No. 8 Oregon State ^ +	3	–	1	–	0	8	–	3	–	0
No. 10 USC +	3	–	1	–	0	7	–	3	–	0
Washington	5	–	2	–	0	6	–	4	–	0
UCLA	2	–	2	–	0	4	–	6	–	0
Stanford	3	–	4	–	0	5	–	5	–	0
Oregon	1	–	2	–	1	7	–	2	–	1
Washington State	1	–	2	–	1	3	–	6	–	1
California	0	–	4	–	0	3	–	7	–	0
+ – Conference co-champions; ^ – Rose Bowl representative determined by longest absence, due to no head-to-head result and 4–4 tie in member vote.; Rankings from AP Poll

The 1964 Oregon State Beavers football team represented Oregon State University as a member of the Athletic Association of Western Universities (AAWU) during the 1964 NCAA University Division football season. It was the team's first season in the AAWU after competing as an independent for five years. Led by Tommy Prothro in his tenth and final season as head coach, the Beavers compiled an overall record of 8–3 with a mark of 3–1 in conference play, sharing the AAWU title with USC, and outscoring their opponents 149 to 124. Oregon State represented the conference in the Rose Bowl, where the Beavers lost to Michigan. It was the last bowl game appearance for the program until 35 years later when the 1999 team was invited to the Oahu Bowl. The team captains were linebacker Dick Ruhl and fullback Booker Washington.

== Schedule ==
Date	Opponent	Rank	Site	Result	Attendance	Source
September 19	at Northwestern*		Dyche Stadium; Evanston, IL	L 3–7	35,805	
September 26	at Colorado*		Folsom Field; Boulder, CO	W 14–7	17,500	
October 3	at Baylor*		Baylor Stadium; Waco, TX	W 13–6	23,000	
October 10	Washington		Multnomah Stadium; Portland, OR	W 9–7	33,853	
October 17	Idaho*		Parker Stadium; Corvallis, OR	W 10–7	13,527	
October 24	No. 8 Syracuse*		Multnomah Stadium; Portland, OR	W 31–13	24,236	
October 31	at Washington State		Rogers Field; Pullman, WA	W 24–7	16,000	
November 7	Indiana*^{†}		Parker Stadium; Corvallis, OR	W 24–14	20,389	
November 14	at Stanford	No. 8	Stanford Stadium	L 7–16	39,500	
November 21	No. 10 Oregon		Parker Stadium; Corvallis, OR (Civil War)	W 7–6	30,154	
January 1, 1965	vs. No. 4 Michigan*	No. 8	Rose Bowl; Pasadena, CA (Rose Bowl)	L 7–34	100,423	
*Non-conference game; ^{†}Homecoming; Rankings from AP Poll released prior to the game; Source:

== Roster ==
1964 Oregon State Beavers football team roster
Players
Coaches
Offense

Pos.	#	Name	Class
QB	19	Paul Brothers	So
OT	74	Ken Brusven	Sr
G	62	Warren Cole	Sr
TB	14	Marv Crowston	Jr
TE	85	Len Frketich	Sr
G	63	Al Funston	Sr
SE	26	Bob Grim	So
C	52	Hoyt Keeny	Sr
OT	79	Rich Koeper	Sr
SB	35	Olvin Moreland	Sr
G	67	Jerry Neil	Sr
FB	48	Pete Pifer	So
QB	18	Gordon Queen	Sr
OT	60	Bill Stellmacher	Jr
TB	28	Cliff Watkins	Jr
FB	47	Booker Washington (C)	Sr

Defense

Pos.	#	Name	Class
S	27	Dan Espalin	Sr
LB	44	Dick Ruhl (C)	Sr
DB		Lew Scott	Jr

Special teams

Pos.	#	Name	Class
PK	12	Steve Clark	Sr
P	85	Len Frketich	Sr
P	27	Dan Espalin	Sr
P	37	Dan Sieg	Sr
H	18	Gordon Queen	Sr

Head coach

- Tommy Prothro (10th year)

Coordinators/assistant coaches

- Bob Zelinka (OC)
- Joe Francis
- Bobb McKittrick
- Ron Siegrist
- Jerry Long
- John Cooper

Legend

- (C) Team captain
- (S) Suspended
- (I) Ineligible
- Injured
- Redshirt

== Game summaries ==
=== Before the season ===
In the spring, Oregon and Oregon State were unanimously invited to enter the Athletic Association of Western Universities after five years as independents. They rejoined six of the other seven members of the Pacific Coast Conference, which disbanded in the spring of 1959. (Idaho, having co-founded the Big Sky Conference in 1963, was not invited to join the AAWU.) Coach Tommy Prothro scrapped the T-formation installed for Terry Baker in favor of the Tiger's I-formation, named after offensive coordinator Bob "Tiger" Zelinka. The Beavers were picked to finish in sixth place in the AAWU.

=== Northwestern ===
	1	2	3	4	Total
Beavers	0	3	0	0	3
Wildcats	0	7	0	0	7

With 1963's starter Gordon Queen sidelined with a knee injury, quarterback Paul Brothers got the start for Oregon State. On Oregon State's second possession of the first quarter, Brothers ran 23 yards for a first down at the Northwestern 13. On fourth down, Booker Washington dove and wound up inches short of a first down. The Wildcats responded by driving 97 yards for a touchdown with 12:30 left in the first half. Later in the second quarter, George Carr came up with a fumble at the Northwestern 47. The Beavers drove 25 yards but had to settle for a 32-yard field goal. Outside of his 23-yard carry, Brothers' other carries accounted for -61 yards rushing. The rest of the team accounted for 58 yards in rushing. The Wildcats dominated most of the major statistical categories.

=== Colorado ===
	1	2	3	4	Total
Beavers	14	0	0	0	14
Buffaloes	0	0	7	0	7

The Oregon State football team visited the state of Colorado for the first time in its history. Playing in a cold drizzle, quarterback Paul Brothers threw for one touchdown and ran for another on the Beavers' first two drives of the game. Steve Clark missed a field goal at the seven in the fourth quarter that would have salted away the game, but the Buffaloes did not mount a serious drive after the field goal miss. Brothers amassed 156 yards of total offense (more than the entire team could muster the week before) in a 14-7 win. The win was the only Beaver victory in the Rocky Mountain State until 2014. The 1964 win remains tied with 2018 and 2023 as Oregon State's most lopsided victory in the State of Colorado.

=== Baylor ===
	1	2	3	4	Total
Beavers	3	7	3	0	13
Bears	0	6	0	0	6

Oregon State made its third ever trip to Texas still looking for its first win in the Lone Star State. The Beavers beat the Bears in 1963 but had never defeated a team from the Southwest Conference on the road. Baylor featured the nation's leading receiver from 1963, All-American, Lawrence Elkins. In the first quarter, the Bears drove down to Oregon State's nine but turned the ball over on downs. Oregon State responded by driving 71 yards in 14 plays to set up Steve Clark's 27-yard field goal with 3:54 left in the first quarter. Elkins put the Bears up 6-3 in the second quarter by hauling in a 33-yard touchdown pass. He and Baylor's Ken Hodge hauled in a total 12 receptions for 226 yards, but the Bears could only manage 47 yards on the ground. Paul Brothers immediately responded by driving 66 yards for a touchdown. Brothers ran in from nine-yards out himself for a 10-6 Beaver lead. Brothers wound up completing 9 of 12 passes for 117 yards and rushing for another 95. Oregon State's Steve Clark tacked on a 34-yard field goal with :26 left in the third quarter. Dan Espalin's second interception with 2:49 left iced the Beaver victory. The Beavers did not win another game in Texas until the 2006 Sun Bowl. Since the 13-6 victory over Baylor, Oregon State has not won a road game in Texas or in any other state which fought for the Confederacy. However, the Beavers did post a tie against Tennessee in Knoxville in 1978. With the folding of the Southwest Conference after the 1995 football season, Oregon State's 13-6 win over Baylor is the Beavers' final victory over a team from the Southwest Conference.

=== Washington ===
	1	2	3	4	Total
Huskies	7	0	0	0	7
Beavers	6	3	0	0	9

From 1925 to 1965, Washington did not play a game in Oregon south of Portland, just across the river from Washington, muting much of the home field advantage Oregon State. The Huskies were the defending Athletic Association of Western Universities champion, hoping for a return to the Rose Bowl. They started out the season ranked #7 but had dropped games to Air Force and Iowa. Despite that fact, they entered the game four-point favorites.

Oregon State's Dan Espalin picked off a pass early in the first quarter at the Washington 39, which the Beavers converted into a touchdown on Charlie Shaw's one-yard plunge. However, Steve Clark's extra point was blocked after a bad snap. Later in the first quarter, the Huskies took the lead on a 66-yard drive, capped off by Charlie Browning's 19-yard run. Oregon State's defense took over in the second quarter; Washington could not breach their own 34-yard line. One of two Jack "Mad Dog" O'Billovich's interceptions helped set up Steve Clark's game-winning 21-yard field goal with five seconds left in the first half. After the game, newspapers marveled at the Beaver's use of the seldom-seen no-huddle offense on the drive. Neither team could muster anything in the second half. Espalin, who served as State's "squib" punter, handling punting duties on the opponent's half of the field, pinned the Huskies within the five-yard line three times. Dick Ruhl clinched the game on a fourth quarter interception. Oregon State's defense held Washington to 139 yards in the game with all but 73 yards coming on the Huskies' 66-yard touchdown drive. Charlie Shaw was named the Athletic Association of Western Universities Back of the Week for his play. Oregon State and Washington have not met in Portland since the 9-7 Beaver victory.

=== Idaho ===
	1	2	3	4	Total
Vandals	0	0	7	0	7
Beavers	0	3	7	0	10

The game marked the first time all season that Oregon State played a game in Corvallis, Oregon. The Beavers took the opening kickoff and drove 53 yards to the Idaho 21, but Steve Clark's field goal was short. Oregon State ended the first quarter at Idaho's 15, but the Vandals intercepted a pass in the second quarter to kill off that drive. The Beavers had an apparent touchdown called back for illegal procedure, so Oregon State kicked a 22-yard field goal to go up 3-0. The Vandals went up 7-3 on a 62-yard third quarter drive. With 5:04 left in the third, the Vandals were forced to punt from their own three. Danny Espalin returned the third quarter punt 43 yards for a touchdown, turning a 7-3 Oregon State deficit into a 10-7 Beaver victory. In the fourth quarter Idaho drove down to Oregon State's 18 yard-line, but the Vandals' 25-yard field goal was no good. Idaho's coach was Dee Andros, who took the head coaching position at Oregon State early in 1965. The Beavers' win was their second and final victory over their future coach.

=== Syracuse ===
	1	2	3	4	Total
Orangemen	7	0	0	6	13
Beavers	14	10	7	0	31

Syracuse's backfield featured two future AFL All-Stars, Floyd Little at tailback and Jim Nance at fullback. The duo combined for 14 touchdowns in the first five games for the Orangemen. Nance was also the defending NCAA heavyweight wrestling champion. Syracuse entered the game on a four-game winning streak, having held their opponents to four touchdowns over the span. In the process, the defense earned the odd nickname "The Spiders." The Orangemen were ranked as high as seventh coming into the game.

On Syracuse's opening drive, Wally Mahle connected with Little, who broke three tackles and sauntered into the end zone to complete the 55-yard touchdown reception. Oregon State responded by scoring 31 consecutive points. Cliff Watkins ran in from 13 yards out to knot the game at seven. Paul Brothers then took over, throwing for two touchdowns and running for another. Watkins caught Brothers' second touchdown pass. Nance's two-yard run in the fourth quarter made the final score 31-13. The 13 points were the most the Beavers had surrendered in 1964. The late touchdown staved off what would have been Syracuse's biggest loss in a decade. The 18-point loss was still the biggest for Syracuse in almost two years and was the largest the Orangemen experienced in 1964. At season's end, Syracuse was invited to play in the Sugar Bowl. The 31 points were the most the Spiders surrendered all year.

=== Washington State ===
	1	2	3	4	Total
Beavers	7	7	0	10	24
Cougars	7	0	0	0	7

Oregon State entered the game having not won on Halloween since 1936. The game served as the Cougars' homecoming game. On the game's second play, Washington State's Clarence Williams fumbled. The Beavers recovered at the Cougars' 42 and marched 42 yards for the touchdown. Paul Brothers, who played most of the game with bruised ribs, hit Doug McDougal for the touchdown and a 7–0 lead. Washington State responded by driving 80 yards to knot the score at seven. Oregon State marched to the Cougar five, but Booker Washington's run on fourth-and-one was stopped for a loss. After holding Washington State, the Beavers got the ball at midfield. Brothers' 12-yard touchdown run capped off the 50-yard drive to give the Beavers a 14-7 lead. For most of the rest of the game, both teams' defenses dominated. With less than two minutes left, Steve Clark made a 26-yard field goal attempt. Marv Crowston, who started the season as a backup quarterback against Northwestern and who had been subsequently converted into a running back, had another touchdown plunge. The win was Oregon State's last Halloween victory until the Beavers' 26–19 win over UCLA in 2009.

=== Indiana ===
	1	2	3	4	Total
Hoosiers	0	14	0	0	14
Beavers	7	7	3	7	24

Indiana made its only trip to Corvallis, Oregon. The AAWU and Big Ten met seven time prior to the Hoosiers traveling to Corvallis in 1964 with each contest ending in a Big Ten win. Oregon State struck first on a 46-yard tackle eligible touchdown pass from Brothers to "Big" Bill Stellmacher. The teams went into the locker rooms tied at 14. Clark kicked a 34-yard field goal to put the Beavers up 17-14 in the third quarter. In the fourth quarter, Brothers dove into the end zone from six yards out for a 24-14 win. The Hoosiers' loss to the Beavers was its second biggest loss of the year. After the game, Indiana's head coach, Phil Dickens said, "I said it before and I’ll say it again: Oregon State is as good a ball club as we play this year." Dickens' words were high praise, considering Indiana had stayed within one score of #5 Ohio State in Columbus. The Beavers' win is the last meeting between the programs and the only meeting between the two programs in Corvallis.

=== Stanford ===
	1	2	3	4	Total
Beavers	0	0	7	0	7
Indians	3	0	6	7	16

The highlight of Stanford's season was upsetting #7 and undefeated Oregon on Halloween. #8 Oregon State presented the Indians the chance to claim a second Top Ten victim and simultaneously sweep the state of Oregon. Dave Lewis became the first Native American to start a game at quarterback for the Stanford Indians. San Francisco 49er and Oregon State alumnus, Vern Burke, was on hand to watch the Beavers.

On Stanford's first possession, Oregon State forced the Indians to punt, but Dan Espalin fumbled inside the Beaver 10. The defense held Stanford out of the end zone, but the Indians' Braden Beck kicked a 23-yard field goal for a 3-0 lead. Later in the first half, Stanford got a first down at the one-yard line, but Oregon State held the Indians to -1 yards in four carries to preserve the three-point deficit.

In the second half, the Beavers forced Stanford to punt at the Indian 45 but were flagged for having too many men on the field. Stanford drove the final 50 yards for a touchdown and a 9-0 lead. The Beavers responded by driving 77 yards in five plays, capped by Paul Brothers' 21-yard touchdown pass to Bob Grim to pull within two. In the fourth quarter, the Indians again drove to the Oregon State one before losing a yard on fourth down. The Beavers' last real threat ended when Medford native Dick Ragsdale intercepted Brothers' pass to Grim at the Stanford 19 and returned the ball back to the 43. From there, the Indians drove 57 yards for the clinching touchdown with four minutes left. The two Oregon State turnovers were the only ones for either team. Brothers completed 11 of 22 passes for 134 yards and ran for another 46. The 180 total yards gave him 1360 on the year, the third-highest single season total in Oregon State history behind Terry Baker's 1960 and 1962 campaigns. Stanford's victory over Oregon and Oregon State gave the Indians a sweep of Oregon for the first time since 1953.

=== Oregon ===
	1	2	3	4	Total
Ducks	0	6	0	0	6
Beavers	0	0	0	7	7

The Beavers entered the game in a four-way tie for first place with the Bruins, Huskies, and Trojans. Oregon and Washington State also had outside shots at the Rose Bowl. In order to qualify for the Rose Bowl, Oregon and the Washingtons needed the Bruins and Trojans to tie. A Bruin-Trojan tie also would have put Oregon State in the Rose Bowl with a win. The Beavers also could clinch at least a share of the conference championship with a win. The Ducks started the season 6-0 and #7 in the AP poll before a last-minute Stanford field goal derailed their season. Oregon followed up the home loss with a home tie against Washington State. The Ducks had not lost or tied a road game in almost two years, the last time Oregon played in Corvallis. 30,154 people were in attendance, the most to ever watch a game in Corvallis up until that time.

Oregon State only committed 10 turnovers in the previous nine games, but Oregon managed to recover three Beaver fumbles in the first half. In the first quarter, Brothers and Booker Washington combined to fumble on first-and-goal at the Duck three. After recovering a second Oregon State's fumbles at the Oregon five, the Ducks drove 95 yards for a touchdown. However, the Beavers' Al East manage to block the extra point to keep the score 6-0. Oregon dominated the third quarter, driving to the Oregon State 16 before being pushed back. The Beavers' final drive began at the Duck 41 with 5:43 left. Brothers converted two fourth down carries on the drive to give Oregon State a first down at the 18. Prothro then called a draw play that Washington ran for 17 yards down to the one. Washington completed the drive by plowing in from the one with 54 seconds left, scoring his only collegiate touchdown in the process. Steve Clark's all-important extra point attempt split the uprights for a 7-6 Beaver lead. The Beavers' drive was 41 yards on 11 plays, taking 4:49 off the clock. In the final 54 seconds, the Ducks managed to drive to the Beaver 27, but their field goal fell short with no time left. Prothro was carried off the field by the players.

=== After the Civil War ===
The Trojans wound up crushing the Bruins 34-13 behind three touchdown passes by future Oregon State coach Craig Fertig. A big Southern California victory was the worst possible result for Oregon State. The win gave the Trojans a 6-3 overall record with a game against the #1 Fighting Irish left. Because Southern California had a game left to play, the Athletic Association of Western universities coaches agreed that, unless the Beavers or Trojans got unanimous support, they would wait to choose the conference representative until after the Battle for the Jeweled Shillelagh. Neither team received unanimous support, so the conference delayed the vote. Many sportswriters and Southern California fans understood this to mean that a win over Notre Dame game would get the Trojans a Rose Bowl berth, but the delay was purely procedural.

The Trojans wound up beating the Irish 20-17 behind Fertig's two touchdown passes. The conference vote took place immediately after the game concluded, splitting four votes apiece. Each team voted for itself; the three northern universities, which had all lost to the Beavers, voted for Oregon State and the three California universities, which had all lost to the Trojans, voted for Southern California. The tiebreaker, which was implemented only the previous February (before Oregon State was admitted to the conference), was to eliminate the team that had most recently gone to the Rose Bowl and Southern California had gone two years earlier.

The Beavers had a better record than the Trojans and also had won one of the two conference victories against the Big Ten, albeit against cellar-dwelling Indiana. The Beavers beat three teams with winning records to the Trojans' two, and two of the teams that the Beavers beat were top ten teams, when the game was played, Oregon and Syracuse. The Beavers and Trojans each went 2-1 against common opponents, although Southern California beat Colorado more decisively and lost to Washington by a single point. Trojans fans, many of whom lived in Pasadena, were livid, particularly because of the delay in the final vote. In addition, conference rules only permitted one team to play in a bowl game, which meant that Southern California's players, students, and fans were stuck in Southern California. The result was a very hostile environment for Oregon State before and during the Rose Bowl.

The Trojans' athletic director Jess Hill called the vote "one of the rankest injustices ever perpetrated in the field of intercollegiate athletics." Trojan students lit bonfires of protest on the school's Fraternity Row. As part of the pregame festivities, the Beavers attended a Los Angeles Laker basketball game and were booed by the Los Angeles crowd.

=== Michigan ===
	1	2	3	4	Total
Wolverines	0	12	15	7	34
Beavers	0	7	0	0	7

Michigan defeated #6 Navy and Roger Staubach by 21 and #9 Michigan State by a touchdown. Then, the Wolverines lost to unheralded Purdue, led by sophomore quarterback Bob Griese, by a single point after failing on a two-point conversion. After the close loss, Michigan won five straight, including the finale against #7 Ohio State to win the Big Ten conference. The Wolverines quarterback/kicker Bob Timberlake set a Big Ten record by scoring 67 points. Wolverine coach, Bump Elliott, was no stranger to Oregon State, having been an assistant under former Beaver coach Kip Taylor.

Michigan's Rose Bowl invitation was its first bowl invitation in fourteen years. It remains the Wolverines longest bowl drought since its 46-year drought between the 1902 and 1948 Rose Bowls. Michigan's fan base appeared to want to make the game memorable, releasing a pig that ambled for a touchdown, during the game. Oregon State broke a scoreless tie in the second quarter, driving 84 yards in 17 plays to take a 7-0 lead. Paul Brothers misfired on his first passing attempt but connected on his next six, finishing the drive by finding Paul McDougal for a five-yard touchdown pass. Outside of the touchdown drive, Brothers was three-for-ten passing. After a quick kick on third-and-ten and a clipping penalty, the Beavers had Michigan pinned at their own 16. The Wolverines ran option right. Michigan's Mel Anthony caught the ball at his 10 and ran towards the right before, juking the final Beaver defender and running down the middle of the field for a Rose Bowl-record 84-yard touchdown. Timberlake's extra point sailed wide. After the missed extra point, a Michigan fan threw a maize-colored smoke bomb on the field. After the smoke cleared, Oregon State ran a draw play for a couple of yards, and Brothers threw an incomplete pass. Rather than try to convert a third-and-six, the Beavers executed a 52-yard quick kick, which was returned 13 yards. The Wolverines drove 25 yards before getting pushed back to the 43. On third-and-sixteen, Carl Ward then took a pitchout on the right side and broke three tackles down the sideline before moving to the middle of the field and running into the end zone. Timberlake's two-point conversion pass attempt was batted down by Al East.

On third-and-nine at midfield, Brothers was sacked at the 39, setting up fourth-and-20. Punter Len Frketich was deep with one blocker in the backfield. Michigan rushed the punt, and four defenders broke through the Oregon State line. Rather than block Bob Mielke, coming straight at Frketich, the sole Beaver blocker attempted to block one of the Wolverine defenders toward the outside of the play. Mielke blocked the punt and the ball rolled backward to the 15 before Anthony finally came up with it. Three plays only netted eight yards, but, on fourth-and-two, James Detwiler ran for four yards to the Oregon State three. After a two-yard Detwiler run, Anthony finished the drive by diving in from one-yard out. Timberlake attempted to run a bootleg for a two-point conversion and appeared to be tackled short of the end zone, but the officials awarded Michigan the two-point conversion to give the Wolverines a 20-7 lead with 6:30 left in the third quarter. A little more than four minutes later Anthony capped a 78-yard Michigan drive, by running in for his third touchdown from seven yards out to put Michigan up 27-7 with 2:20 left in the third quarter. The three touchdowns tied Four Horsemen of Notre Dame fullback Elmer Layden's Rose Bowl record and earned Anthony player of the game honors. Michigan tacked on a fourth-quarter touchdown to win 34-7. The win was the biggest by the Big Ten in the Rose Bowl since 1952, when the conference was still known as the Western Conference. The 34-7 loss remains Oregon State's last appearance in the Rose Bowl. The Beavers attempted three quick kicks. Twice on third down and once on second down. The two third down quick kicks ignited the Wolverines' first two touchdown drives.

=== After the season ===
Coach Tommy Prothro took the head coaching job at UCLA less than a week after the game ended, and the Bruins won the Rose Bowl in his first season. Oregon State hired Idaho's Demosthenes Konstandies Andrecopoulos, a.k.a. Dee Andros, and he immediately got to work, trying to recruit Steve Preece of Borah in Boise, who had great speed (10.0 in the 100-yard dash) and a good arm, a great fit for the option offense Andros intended to implement. New linebackers coach Ed Knecht, who had connections in southwestern Idaho as the recent head coach at Boise High, received a phone call warning him that a rival school was attempting to steal Preece away from the Beavers, so Knecht promptly called Andros with the news. Andros responded, "Get the $@%! over there. And if you don't get him, don't bother to come back." Preece ultimately signed with Oregon State.

== NFL draft ==
Player	Position	Round	Pick	NFL club
Dick Koeper	Tackle	6	74	Green Bay Packers
Doug McDougal	End	16	215	Dallas Cowboys
Len Frketich	End/Punter	17	226	San Francisco 49ers Packers
Steve Clark	Kicker	17	234	Green Bay Packers
