= 1964 Minnesota Golden Gophers football team =

American college football season

1964 Minnesota Golden Gophers football
- Conference: Big Ten Conference
- Record: 5–4 (4–3 Big Ten)
- Head coach: Murray Warmath (11th season)
- MVP: Joe Pung
- Captain: Joe Pung
- Home stadium: Memorial Stadium

1964 Big Ten Conference football standings
	Conf.					Overall
Team	W		L		T	W		L		T
No. 4 Michigan $	6	–	1	–	0	9	–	1	–	0
No. 9 Ohio State	5	–	1	–	0	7	–	2	–	0
Purdue	5	–	2	–	0	6	–	3	–	0
Illinois	4	–	3	–	0	6	–	3	–	0
Minnesota	4	–	3	–	0	5	–	4	–	0
Michigan State	3	–	3	–	0	4	–	5	–	0
Northwestern	2	–	5	–	0	3	–	6	–	0
Wisconsin	2	–	5	–	0	3	–	6	–	0
Iowa	1	–	5	–	0	3	–	6	–	0
Indiana	1	–	5	–	0	2	–	7	–	0
$ – Conference champion; Rankings from AP Poll

The 1964 Minnesota Golden Gophers football team represented the University of Minnesota in the 1964 Big Ten Conference football season. In their 11th year under head coach Murray Warmath, the Golden Gophers compiled a 5–4 record and outscored their opponents by a combined total of 136 to 131.

Center Joe Pung received the team's Most Valuable Player award. Back Kraig Lofquist and end Aaron Brown were named All-Big Ten first team. Center Joe Pung and fullback Mike Reid were named All-Big Ten second team.

Total attendance at five home games was 268,908, an average of 53,782 per game. The largest crowd was against Iowa. Memorial Stadium was the home of the Golden Gophers from 1924-1981

== Schedule ==
Date	Opponent	Site	Result	Attendance	Source
September 26	Nebraska*	Memorial Stadium; Minneapolis, MN (rivalry)	L 21–26	49,769	
October 3	at California*	California Memorial Stadium; Berkeley, CA	W 26-20	53,000–54,217	
October 10	Northwestern	Memorial Stadium; Minneapolis, MN	W 21–18	54,275	
October 17	Illinois^{†}	Memorial Stadium; Minneapolis, MN	L 0-14	60,475	
October 24	at Michigan	Michigan Stadium; Ann Arbor, MI (Little Brown Jug)	L 12–19	61,859	
October 31	at Indiana	Seventeenth Street Football Stadium; Bloomington, IN	W 21–0	33,245	
November 7	Iowa	Memorial Stadium; Minneapolis, MN (rivalry)	W 14–13	63,350	
November 14	Purdue	Memorial Stadium; Minneapolis, MN	W 14–7	50,255	
November 21	at Wisconsin	Camp Randall Stadium; Madison, WI (rivalry)	L 7–14	61,306	
*Non-conference game; ^{†}Homecoming

== Game summaries ==
=== Michigan ===
Week 5: Minnesota at Michigan

Team	1	2	3	4	Total
Minnesota (2–2)	0	0	0	12	12
• Michigan (3–1)	7	3	9	0	19

- Date: October 24, 1964
- Location: Michigan Stadium
  Ann Arbor, Michigan
- Game attendance: 61,859

In the fifth game of the season, Minnesota lost to Michigan 19–12 in Ann Arbor. Prior to 1964, Michigan had lost four consecutive games in the annual contest for the Little Brown Jug. Michigan led the game 19–0 in the fourth quarter and held off a comeback attempt by the Golden Gophers. Minnesota scored two fourth-quarter touchdowns, but missed twice on two-point conversion attempts. The Golden Gophers closed the score to 19–12 on a 91-yard interception return by Kraig Lofquist. They subsequently drove to the Michigan three-yard line, but the Michigan defense held on fourth down.
