= 1964 Illinois Fighting Illini football team =

American college football season

1964 Illinois Fighting Illini football
- Conference: Big Ten Conference

Ranking
- Coaches: No. 16
- Record: 6–3 (4–3 Big Ten)
- Head coach: Pete Elliott (5th season)
- MVP: Dick Butkus
- Captains: Dick Butkus; George Donnelly
- Home stadium: Memorial Stadium

1964 Big Ten Conference football standings
	Conf.					Overall
Team	W		L		T	W		L		T
No. 4 Michigan $	6	–	1	–	0	9	–	1	–	0
No. 9 Ohio State	5	–	1	–	0	7	–	2	–	0
Purdue	5	–	2	–	0	6	–	3	–	0
Illinois	4	–	3	–	0	6	–	3	–	0
Minnesota	4	–	3	–	0	5	–	4	–	0
Michigan State	3	–	3	–	0	4	–	5	–	0
Northwestern	2	–	5	–	0	3	–	6	–	0
Wisconsin	2	–	5	–	0	3	–	6	–	0
Iowa	1	–	5	–	0	3	–	6	–	0
Indiana	1	–	5	–	0	2	–	7	–	0
$ – Conference champion; Rankings from AP Poll

The 1964 Illinois Fighting Illini football team was an American football team that represented the University of Illinois as a member of the Big Ten Conference during the 1964 Big Ten season. In their fourth year under head coach Pete Elliott, the Fighting Illini compiled a 6–3 record (4–3 in conference games), tied for fourth place in the Big Ten, and outscored opponents by a total of 142 to 100. They were ranked No. 2 in the AP poll in week 3 but dropped out of the poll after losing to Ohio State.

Center and linebacker Dick Butkus was a unanimous pick for the 1964 All-America team. He was also named the American Football Coaches Association Player of the Year, finished third in Heisman Trophy balloting, and was selected as the team's most valuable player.

Two other Illinois players received first-team All-America honors: guard Archie Sutton and fullback Jim Grabowski. Grabowski led the Big Ten with 186 carries, 1,004 rushing yards, and 10 rushing touchdowns. The team's other statistical leaders included quarterback Fred Custardo (1,012 passing yards, 54.1% completion percentage), and wide receiver Bob Trumpy (28 receptions for 428 yards).

The team played its home games at Memorial Stadium in Champaign, Illinois.

== Schedule ==
Date	Opponent	Rank	Site	Result	Attendance	Source
September 26	at California*	No. 3	California Memorial Stadium; Berkeley, CA	W 20–14	45,000	
October 3	at Northwestern	No. 3	Dyche Stadium; Evanston, IL (rivalry)	W 17–6	52,062	
October 10	No. 4 Ohio State	No. 2	Memorial Stadium; Champaign, IL (Illibuck)	L 0–26	71,227	
October 17	at Minnesota		Memorial Stadium; Minneapolis, MN	W 14–0	60,475	
October 24	UCLA*		Memorial Stadium; Champaign, IL	W 26–7	68,727	
October 31	at Purdue		Ross–Ade Stadium; West Lafayette, IN (rivalry)	L 14–26	59,425	
November 7	at Michigan		Michigan Stadium; Ann Arbor, MI (rivalry)	L 6–21	62,415	
November 14	Wisconsin		Memorial Stadium; Champaign, IL	W 29–0	55,077	
November 21	Michigan State		Memorial Stadium; Champaign, IL	W 16–0	32,000	
*Non-conference game; Rankings from AP Poll released prior to the game; Source:

== Awards and honors ==
Center/linebacker Dick Butkus won numerous honors in 1964, including:

- He was a unanimous pick for the 1964 All-America team with first-team honors from the Associated Press (AP), United Press International (UPI), American Football Coaches Association (AFCA), Football Writers Association of America (FWAA), Central Press (CP), Football News (FN), Time magazine, and The Sporting News (TSN).
- He was selected by the AFCA and Sport Magazine as the college football player of the year.
- He finished third in Heisman Trophy balloting.

Others receiving All-America honors included:

- Defensive back George Donnelly won first-team honors from The Sporting News and Time magazine.
- Fullback Jim Grabowski won first-team honors from the UPI and Football News. Grabowski was later inducted into the College Football Hall of Fame.
- Guard Archie Sutton won first-team honors from Time magazine.

== 1965 NFL draft ==
Player	Round	Pick	Position	Club
Dick Butkus	1	3	Linebacker	Chicago Bears
George Donnelly	1	13	Back	San Francisco 49ers
Archie Sutton	2	15	Tackle	Minnesota Vikings
Gregg Schumacher	13	170	End	San Francisco 49ers
Dave Powless	17	225	Guard	New York Giants

- Dick Butkus was also drafted by the Denver Broncos in the 1965 American Football League draft.
