= 1964 California Golden Bears football team =

American college football season

1964 California Golden Bears football
- Conference: Athletic Association of Western Universities
- Record: 3–7 (0–4 AAWU)
- Head coach: Ray Willsey (1st season)
- Home stadium: California Memorial Stadium

1964 Athletic Association of Western Universities football standings
	Conf.					Overall
Team	W		L		T	W		L		T
No. 8 Oregon State ^ +	3	–	1	–	0	8	–	3	–	0
No. 10 USC +	3	–	1	–	0	7	–	3	–	0
Washington	5	–	2	–	0	6	–	4	–	0
UCLA	2	–	2	–	0	4	–	6	–	0
Stanford	3	–	4	–	0	5	–	5	–	0
Oregon	1	–	2	–	1	7	–	2	–	1
Washington State	1	–	2	–	1	3	–	6	–	1
California	0	–	4	–	0	3	–	7	–	0
+ – Conference co-champions; ^ – Rose Bowl representative determined by longest absence, due to no head-to-head result and 4–4 tie in member vote.; Rankings from AP Poll

The 1964 California Golden Bears football team was an American football team that represented the University of California, Berkeley in the Athletic Association of Western Universities (AAWU) during the 1964 NCAA University Division football season. In its first year under head coach Ray Willsey, the Golden Bears compiled a 3–7 record (0–4 in AAWU, last) and were outscored 187 to 152. Home games were played on campus at California Memorial Stadium in Berkeley, California.

California's statistical leaders on offense were senior quarterback Craig Morton with 2,121 passing yards, Tom Relles with 519 rushing yards, and Jack Schraub with 633 receiving yards. A three-year starter, Morton was the fifth overall pick in November's NFL draft, taken ahead of Joe Namath, and was later inducted into the College Football Hall of Fame.

== Schedule ==
Date	Opponent	Site	Result	Attendance	Source
September 19	Missouri*	California Memorial Stadium; Berkeley, CA	W 21–14	42,000	
September 26	No. 3 Illinois*	California Memorial Stadium; Berkeley, CA	L 14–20	45,000	
October 3	Minnesota*	California Memorial Stadium; Berkeley, CA	L 20–26	53,000–54,217	
October 9	at Miami (FL)*	Miami Orange Bowl; Miami, FL	W 9–7	32,442	
October 17	Navy*	California Memorial Stadium; Berkeley, CA	W 27–13	63,000	
October 24	at USC	Los Angeles Memorial Coliseum; Los Angeles, CA	L 21–26	48,105	
October 31	UCLA	California Memorial Stadium; Berkeley, CA (rivalry)	L 21–25	45,000	
November 7	at Washington	Husky Stadium; Seattle, WA	L 16–21	56,000	
November 14	Utah*	California Memorial Stadium; Berkeley, CA	L 0–14	33,000	
November 21	Stanford	California Memorial Stadium; Berkeley, CA (Big Game)	L 3–21	76,780	
*Non-conference game; Rankings from AP Poll released prior to the game; Source:

== Roster ==
1964 California Golden Bears football team roster
Players
Coaches
Offense

Pos.	#	Name	Class
QB		Craig Morton	Sr
RB		Tom Relles
E		Jack Schraub

Defense

Pos.	#	Name	Class

Special teams

Pos.	#	Name	Class

Head coach

- Ray Willsey (1st year)

Coordinators/assistant coaches

Legend

- (C) Team captain
- (S) Suspended
- (I) Ineligible
- Injured
- Redshirt
