= 1964 USC Trojans football team =

American college football season

1964 USC Trojans football

AAWU co-champion
- Conference: Athletic Association of Western Universities

Ranking
- Coaches: No. 10
- AP: No. 10
- Record: 7–3 (3–1 AAWU)
- Head coach: John McKay (5th season)
- Captains: Craig Fertig; Bill Fisk
- Home stadium: Los Angeles Memorial Coliseum

1964 Athletic Association of Western Universities football standings
	Conf.					Overall
Team	W		L		T	W		L		T
No. 8 Oregon State ^ +	3	–	1	–	0	8	–	3	–	0
No. 10 USC +	3	–	1	–	0	7	–	3	–	0
Washington	5	–	2	–	0	6	–	4	–	0
UCLA	2	–	2	–	0	4	–	6	–	0
Stanford	3	–	4	–	0	5	–	5	–	0
Oregon	1	–	2	–	1	7	–	2	–	1
Washington State	1	–	2	–	1	3	–	6	–	1
California	0	–	4	–	0	3	–	7	–	0
+ – Conference co-champions; ^ – Rose Bowl representative determined by longest absence, due to no head-to-head result and 4–4 tie in member vote.; Rankings from AP Poll

The 1964 USC Trojans football team represented the University of Southern California (USC) in the 1964 NCAA University Division football season. In their fifth year under head coach John McKay, the Trojans compiled a 7–3 record (3–1 against conference opponents), finished in a tie with Oregon State for the Athletic Association of Western Universities (AAWU or Pac-8) championship, and outscored their opponents 207 to 130. The Trojans ended their season with an upset victory over undefeated and top-ranked Notre Dame.

Quarterback Craig Fertig was one of the team's two captains and led the team in passing, completing 109 of 209 passes for 1,671 yards with 11 touchdowns and 10 interceptions. Mike Garrett led the team in rushing with 217 carries for 948 yards and nine touchdowns. Rod Sherman led the team in receiving yardage with 24 catches for 446 yards and five touchdowns.

== Schedule ==
Date	Opponent	Rank	Site	Result	Attendance	Source
September 18	Colorado*		Los Angeles Memorial Coliseum; Los Angeles, CA	W 21–0	39,173	
September 26	at No. 2 Oklahoma*		Oklahoma Memorial Stadium; Norman, OK	W 40–14	61,700	
October 3	at Michigan State*	No. 2	Spartan Stadium; East Lansing, MI	L 7–17	70,102	
October 10	Texas A&M*		Los Angeles Memorial Coliseum; Los Angeles, CA	W 31–7	42,295	
October 17	at No. 2 Ohio State*		Ohio Stadium; Columbus, OH	L 0–17	84,315	
October 24	California		Los Angeles Memorial Coliseum; Los Angeles, CA	W 26–21	48,105	
October 31	Washington^{†}		Los Angeles Memorial Coliseum; Los Angeles, CA	L 13–14	50,577	
November 7	at Stanford		Stanford Stadium; Stanford, CA (rivalry)	W 15–10	55,000	
November 21	at UCLA		Los Angeles Memorial Coliseum; Los Angeles, CA (Victory Bell)	W 34–13	62,108	
November 28	No. 1 Notre Dame*		Los Angeles Memorial Coliseum; Los Angeles, CA (rivalry)	W 20–17	83,840	
*Non-conference game; ^{†}Homecoming; Rankings from AP Poll released prior to the game; Source:

== Game summaries ==
=== Notre Dame ===
Team	1	2	3	4	Total
Notre Dame	3	14	0	0	17
• USC	0	0	7	13	20

- Date: November 27
- Location: Los Angeles Memorial Coliseum, Los Angeles
- Game attendance: 83,840

Scoring summary
1		ND	Ivan 25-yard field goal	Notre Dame 3-0
2		ND	Snow 21-yard pass from Huarte (Ivan kick)	Notre Dame 10-0
2		ND	Wolski 5-yard run (Ivan kick)	Notre Dame 17-0
3		USC	Garrett 1-yard run (Brownell kick)	Notre Dame 17-7
4	4:45	USC	Hill 23-yard pass from Fertig (kick failed)	Notre Dame 17-13
4	1:35	USC	Sherman 15-yard pass from Fertig (Brownell kick)	USC 20-17
