= 1964 UCLA Bruins football team =

American college football season

1964 UCLA Bruins football
- Conference: Athletic Association of Western Universities
- Record: 4–6 (2–2 AAWU)
- Head coach: Bill Barnes (7th season)
- Home stadium: Los Angeles Memorial Coliseum

1964 Athletic Association of Western Universities football standings
	Conf.					Overall
Team	W		L		T	W		L		T
No. 8 Oregon State ^ +	3	–	1	–	0	8	–	3	–	0
No. 10 USC +	3	–	1	–	0	7	–	3	–	0
Washington	5	–	2	–	0	6	–	4	–	0
UCLA	2	–	2	–	0	4	–	6	–	0
Stanford	3	–	4	–	0	5	–	5	–	0
Oregon	1	–	2	–	1	7	–	2	–	1
Washington State	1	–	2	–	1	3	–	6	–	1
California	0	–	4	–	0	3	–	7	–	0
+ – Conference co-champions; ^ – Rose Bowl representative determined by longest absence, due to no head-to-head result and 4–4 tie in member vote.; Rankings from AP Poll

The 1964 UCLA Bruins football team was an American football team that represented the University of California, Los Angeles during the 1964 NCAA University Division football season. In their seventh and final year under head coach Bill Barnes, the Bruins compiled a 4–6 record (2–2 AAWU) and finished in fourth place in the Athletic Association of Western Universities.

UCLA's offensive leaders in 1964 were quarterback Larry Zeno with 1,363 passing yards and 325 rushing yards, and Mike Haffner with 515 receiving yards.

A month after the season, Barnes resigned as head coach in December, and was succeeded by Tommy Prothro, head coach at eighth-ranked Oregon State for ten seasons and a former UCLA assistant.

== Schedule ==
Date	Opponent	Site	Result	Attendance	Source
September 12	at Pittsburgh*	Pitt Stadium; Pittsburgh, PA	W 17–12	41,333	
September 26	Penn State*	Los Angeles Memorial Coliseum; Los Angeles, CA	W 21–14	34,636	
October 3	Stanford	Los Angeles Memorial Coliseum; Los Angeles, CA	W 27–20	35,970	
October 10	at Syracuse*	Archbold Stadium; Syracuse, NY	L 0–39	35,000	
October 17	at No. 4 Notre Dame*	Notre Dame Stadium; Notre Dame, IN	L 0–24	58,335	
October 24	at Illinois*	Memorial Stadium; Champaign, IL	L 7–26	68,727	
October 31	at California	California Memorial Stadium; Berkeley, CA (rivalry)	W 25–21	45,000	
November 7	Air Force*	Los Angeles Memorial Coliseum; Los Angeles, CA	L 15–24	24,888	
November 14	at Washington	Husky Stadium; Seattle, WA	L 20–22	55,000	
November 21	USC	Los Angeles Memorial Coliseum; Los Angeles, CA (Victory Bell)	L 13–34	62,108	
*Non-conference game; Rankings from AP Poll released prior to the game; Source:
