= Lew Scott =

American football player (born 1943)

No. 45
- Positions: Defensive back, return specialist

Personal information
- Born: June 6, 1943 (age 83); Bryn Mawr, Pennsylvania, U.S.
- Listed height: 5 ft 11 in (1.80 m)
- Listed weight: 170 lb (77 kg)

Career information
- High school: West Conshohocken, Upper Merion Area
- College: Mesa Junior College, Oregon State

Career history
- Denver Broncos (1966)

Awards and highlights
- Pennsylvania Sports Hall of Fame Montgomery County Chapter (2016)

Career statistics
- Games played: 13
- Stats at Pro Football Reference

Lewis Simon Scott (born June 6, 1943) is an American former professional football player who was a defensive back for one season with the Denver Broncos of the American Football League (AFL). He played quarterback and wide receiver in college.

== Early life and education ==
Lew Scott was born on June 6, 1943, in Bryn Mawr, Pennsylvania. He went to high school at West Conshohocken High School and at Upper Merion Area High School. While at Upper Merion, he was a standout in football and track, and won the State Championship in the 440 and 880. He went to college at Mesa Junior College. He was there from 1962 to 1963 before transferring to Oregon State. While he was at Mesa Junior college, he was a quarterback. When he was at Oregon State, he was a defensive back and receiver. In 1965, he had 6 catches for 77 yards.

== Professional career ==
He signed with the Denver Broncos in 1966. He played in 13 games; mostly on special teams as a return specialist. He had 7 punt returns for 56 yards and 9 kick returns for 282 yards. His longest return was a 77-yard kick return against the Kansas City Chiefs.

== Later life ==
After his sports career he worked for Weyerhaeuser Lumber, Peace Corps, Sloan Program, Nuclear Regulatory Commission, and Xerox. He was inducted into the Pennsylvania Sports Hall of Fame Montgomery County Chapter on September 30, 2016, at the Valley Forge Casino Resort. The day before he had his number retired at Upper Merion High School. His brother, Clarence Scott, also received those honors.
