= 1964 Washington Huskies football team =

American college football season

1964 Washington Huskies football
- Conference: Athletic Association of Western Universities
- Record: 6–4 (5–2 AAWU)
- Head coach: Jim Owens (8th season)
- Captains: Charlie Browning; Rick Redman
- Home stadium: University of Washington Stadium

1964 Athletic Association of Western Universities football standings
	Conf.					Overall
Team	W		L		T	W		L		T
No. 8 Oregon State ^ +	3	–	1	–	0	8	–	3	–	0
No. 10 USC +	3	–	1	–	0	7	–	3	–	0
Washington	5	–	2	–	0	6	–	4	–	0
UCLA	2	–	2	–	0	4	–	6	–	0
Stanford	3	–	4	–	0	5	–	5	–	0
Oregon	1	–	2	–	1	7	–	2	–	1
Washington State	1	–	2	–	1	3	–	6	–	1
California	0	–	4	–	0	3	–	7	–	0
+ – Conference co-champions; ^ – Rose Bowl representative determined by longest absence, due to no head-to-head result and 4–4 tie in member vote.; Rankings from AP Poll

The 1964 Washington Huskies football team was an American football team that represented the University of Washington during the 1964 NCAA University Division football season. In its eighth season under head coach Jim Owens, the team compiled a 6–4 record, finished third in the Athletic Association of Western Universities, and outscored its opponents 139 to 110. Charlie Browning and Rick Redman were the team captains.

== Schedule ==
Date	Opponent	Rank	Site	Result	Attendance	Source
September 19	Air Force*	No. 7	University of Washington Stadium; Seattle, WA	L 2–3	56,000	
September 26	Baylor*	No. 7	University of Washington Stadium; Seattle, WA	W 35–14	56,700–57,302	
October 3	at Iowa*	No. 10	Kinnick Stadium; Iowa City, IA	L 18–28	48,000	
October 10	at Oregon State		Multnomah Stadium; Portland, OR	L 7–9	33,853	
October 17	at Stanford		Stanford Stadium; Stanford, CA	W 6–0	30,468–33,500	
October 24	Oregon		University of Washington Stadium; Seattle, WA (rivalry)	L 0–7	55,625	
October 31	at USC		Los Angeles Memorial Coliseum; Los Angeles, CA	W 14–13	50,577	
November 7	California		University of Washington Stadium; Seattle, WA	W 21–16	56,000	
November 14	UCLA		University of Washington Stadium; Seattle, WA	W 22–20	55,000	
November 21	at Washington State		Joe Albi Stadium; Spokane, WA (Apple Cup)	W 14–0	35,600	
*Non-conference game; Rankings from AP Poll released prior to the game; Source:

== Game summaries ==
=== Washington State ===
Team	1	2	3	4	Total
• Washington	0	14	0	0	14
Washington State	0	0	0	0	0

- Date: November 21
- Location: Joe Albi Stadium, Spokane, WA
- Game attendance: 35,600

Scoring summary
2	WASH	Jordan 4-yard run (kick failed)	WASH 6-0
2	WASH	Browning 1-yard run (Hullin run)	WASH 14-0

== Coaching staff ==
- Dick Heatly
- Don McKeta
- Ed Peasley
- Dave Phillips
- Bob Schloredt
- Tom Tipps
- Chesty Walker
- Don White

== Professional football draft selections ==
Four University of Washington Huskies were selected in the 1965 NFL draft, which lasted 20 rounds with 280 selections. Two of those Huskies were also selected in the 1965 AFL draft, which lasted 20 rounds with 160 selections.

= Husky Hall of Fame

League	Player	Position	Round	Pick	Franchise
NFL	Jim Norton	Tackle	3rd	30	San Francisco 49ers
NFL	Charley Browning	Back	7th	87	Pittsburgh Steelers
NFL	Junior Coffey	Fullback	7th	94	Green Bay Packers
NFL	Rick Redman	Linebacker	10th	132	Philadelphia Eagles
AFL	Rick Redman	Linebacker	5th	38	San Diego Chargers
AFL	Junior Coffey	Halfback	16th	122	Houston Oilers
