= 1964 Oregon Ducks football team =

American college football season

1964 Oregon Ducks football
- Conference: Athletic Association of Western Universities
- Record: 7–2–1 (1–2–1 AAWU)
- Head coach: Len Casanova (14th season)
- Captains: Bob Berry; Lowell Dean
- Home stadium: Hayward Field; Multnomah Stadium

1964 Athletic Association of Western Universities football standings
	Conf.					Overall
Team	W		L		T	W		L		T
No. 8 Oregon State ^ +	3	–	1	–	0	8	–	3	–	0
No. 10 USC +	3	–	1	–	0	7	–	3	–	0
Washington	5	–	2	–	0	6	–	4	–	0
UCLA	2	–	2	–	0	4	–	6	–	0
Stanford	3	–	4	–	0	5	–	5	–	0
Oregon	1	–	2	–	1	7	–	2	–	1
Washington State	1	–	2	–	1	3	–	6	–	1
California	0	–	4	–	0	3	–	7	–	0
+ – Conference co-champions; ^ – Rose Bowl representative determined by longest absence, due to no head-to-head result and 4–4 tie in member vote.; Rankings from AP Poll

The 1964 Oregon Ducks football team represented the University of Oregon as a member of the Athletic Association of Western Universities (AAWU) during 1964 NCAA University Division football season. Led by 14th-year head coach Len Casanova, the Ducks compiled an overall record of 7–2–1 with a mark of 1–2–1 in conference play, tying for sixth place in the AAWU. Oregon played three home games on campus at Hayward Field in Eugene, Oregon and two at Multnomah Stadium in Portland.

After five seasons as an independent following the dissolution of the Pacific Coast Conference (PCC), Oregon joined the AAWU this season, as did Oregon State. The Ducks played only one of the four conference teams from the state of California, a 10–8 loss to Stanford at Portland, decided with a late field goal.

With a perfect record and a No 7 ranking after six games (and a ten-game winning streak), Oregon won just one of its final four. The Oregon State Beavers won the season-ending Civil War by a point at home with a late touchdown. The game was shown on closed-circuit television in Eugene (McArthur Court) and Portland (Memorial Coliseum), with admission at two dollars. The rivalry game loss ended Oregon's season, as the AAWU/Pac-8 (and Big Ten) did not allow a second bowl team until the 1975 season.

Oregon was led on the field by All-American quarterback Bob Berry, who finished 13th in the balloting for the Heisman Trophy, just behind Joe Namath (Alabama) and Gale Sayers (Kansas). A fifth-year senior, he had already been selected in the 1964 NFL draft (and AFL draft) in late 1963.

Oregon football made its first-ever trip by jet this season, taking a Boeing 720 to Indiana in mid-November.

== Schedule ==
Date	Time	Opponent	Rank	Site	Result	Attendance	Source
September 19		BYU*		Hayward Field; Eugene, OR	W 20–13	15,000	
September 26		Pittsburgh*		Multnomah Stadium; Portland, OR	W 22–13	24,662	
October 3		at Penn State*		Beaver Stadium; University Park, PA	W 22–14	44,600	
October 10		at Idaho*		Neale Stadium; Moscow, ID	W 14–8	11,000	
October 17		Arizona*		Hayward Field; Eugene, OR	W 21–0	18,000	
October 24		at Washington		Husky Stadium; Seattle, WA (rivalry)	W 7–0	55,300	
October 31	2:00 p.m.	Stanford	No. 7	Multnomah Stadium; Portland, OR	L 8–10	26,800–26,870	
November 7		Washington State^{†}		Hayward Field; Eugene, OR	T 21–21	19,000	
November 14		at Indiana*		Seventeenth Street Football Stadium; Bloomington, IN	W 29–21	20,078	
November 21		at Oregon State	No. 10	Parker Stadium; Corvallis, OR (Civil War)	L 6–7	30,154	
*Non-conference game; ^{†}Homecoming; Rankings from AP Poll released prior to the game; All times are in Pacific time

== All-conference ==
Selected by the coaches, the all-conference team included guard Mark Richards and center Dave Tobey.
