= Carl Silvestri =

American football player (1943–2004)

Carl Silvestri (March 27, 1943 – November 25, 2004) was a player in the National Football League for the St. Louis Cardinals and Atlanta Falcons in 1965 and 1966 as a defensive back. He played at the collegiate level at the University of Wisconsin–Madison.

== Biography ==
Silvestri was born on March 27, 1943, in Milwaukee, Wisconsin. He attended St. Robert's elementary school and Shorewood High School in Shorewood, Wisconsin. Silvestri died on November 25, 2004, in Mequon, Wisconsin.
