= Rich Badar =

American football player (born 1943)

No. 11
- Position: Quarterback

Personal information
- Born: March 8, 1943 (age 83); Cleveland, Ohio, U.S.

Career information
- High school: St. Stanislaus (Cleveland)
- College: Indiana (1961–1964)
- NFL draft: 1965: undrafted

Career history
- Washington Redskins (1965)*; Richmond Rebels (1965); Winnipeg Blue Bombers (1966–1967); Pittsburgh Steelers (1967)
- * Offseason or practice squad member only

Career NFL statistics
- Games played: 1
- Stats at Pro Football Reference

Richard Chester Badar (born March 8, 1943) is an American former professional football player who was a quarterback in the National Football League (NFL) and Canadian Football League (CFL). He played college football for the Indiana Hoosiers.

== Early life ==
Badar attended St. Stanislaus High School in Cleveland, Ohio (which later merged into Cleveland Central Catholic High School). As a sophomore he played the halfback position and was described as a "strong insider runner and a tough defensive performer". As a junior, Badar was moved to quarterback and led the team to a North Central League title and a 7–0 record, the first undefeated season in school history. He was named the North Central League co-MVP as a senior in 1960. Badar also played as a forward on the school's basketball team, earning North Central League MVP honors as a senior.

== College career ==
Badar played college football for the Hoosiers at Indiana University Bloomington from 1961 to 1964. As a junior, he led the Big Ten Conference with a 59.7% completion rate. As a senior in 1964, Badar completed 121-of-245 pass attempts for 1,571 yards and was voted team MVP by his teammates. He earned an invitation to the Senior Bowl, where he scored a rushing touchdown for the North team in the 7–7 tie, as well as the North–South Shrine Game.

== Professional career ==
After going unselected in the 1965 NFL draft, Badar signed with the Washington Redskins as an undrafted free agent. He attempted one pass in their preseason opener against the Philadelphia Eagles, which was caught by Jack Dean for 99 yards. However, Badar was released by Washington on August 26, and signed with the Richmond Rebels of the Continental Football League soon afterwards.

On May 5, 1966, Badar signed with the Winnipeg Blue Bombers of the Canadian Football League. After appearing in eight games in 1966, he re-signed with the team ahead of the 1967 season. Badar was released by Winnipeg on August 21. He signed with the Pittsburgh Steelers the following month, serving as backup to Kent Nix after an injury to regular starter Bill Nelsen.
