= Ed Flanagan (American football) =

American football player (1944–2023)

No. 54
- Position: Center

Personal information
- Born: February 23, 1944; San Bernardino, California, U.S.
- Died: May 10, 2023 (aged 79); Altoona, Pennsylvania, U.S.
- Listed height: 6 ft 3 in (1.91 m)
- Listed weight: 245 lb (111 kg)

Career information
- High school: Altoona (Altoona, Pennsylvania)
- College: Purdue (1961-1964)
- NFL draft: 1965: 5th round, 64th overall pick

Career history

Playing
- Detroit Lions (1965–1974); San Diego Chargers (1975–1976); Los Angeles Rams (1977)*
- * Offseason or practice squad member only

Coaching
- Oakland Invaders (1984-1985) Offensive line coach; Arizona Rattlers (1985) Line coach; Cedar Rapids Titans (2013) Assistant coach

Awards and highlights
- 2x Second-team All-Pro (1969, 1970); 4× Pro Bowl (1969, 1970, 1971, 1973); Detroit Lions 75th Anniversary Team; Detroit Lions All-Time Team; Second-team All-Big Ten (1964)

Career NFL statistics
- Games played: 165
- Games started: 164
- Fumble recoveries: 7
- Stats at Pro Football Reference

Edward Joseph Flanagan (February 23, 1944 – May 10, 2023) was an American professional football player who was a center in the National Football League (NFL). He played college football for the Purdue Boilermakers, before playing in the NFL for the Detroit Lions from 1965 to 1974 and for the San Diego Chargers from 1975 to 1976. Flanagan was selected to four Pro Bowls. After his playing career, he was a football coach.

== Early life ==
Flanagan was born on February 23, 1944, in San Bernardino, California. His family moved to Altoona, Pennsylvania, where he played football under coach Earl Strohm at Altoona High School. When inducted into the Blair County Sports Hall of Fame in 1987, Flanagan noted that he had not been a star player in high school and was not a starter until his senior year.

== College career ==
Flanagan played college football at Purdue University from 1962 to 1964. He grew from 190 to 230 pounds (86 to 104 kg) between his freshman and sophomore years. During his sophomore and junior years, he played center on offense and linebacker on defense. As a senior, he was the starting center for the 1964 Boilermakers team that featured Bob Griese at quarterback and compiled a 6–3 record and finished in third place in the Big Ten Conference. Flanagan was selected by the conference coaches for the United Press International as the second-team center on the 1964 All-Big Ten team. He also played in the Blue-Gray Game and the Senior Bowl after his senior year.

== Professional playing career ==
Flanagan was selected by the Detroit Lions in the fifth round, 64th overall pick, of the 1965 NFL draft. His initial contract with the Lions was for a $2,000 bonus and $12,000 a year. While playing for the Lions, Flanagan supplemented his income in the off-season selling steel to the automobile companies, selling real estate, and working for a beer distributorship owned by former Detroit Tigers star Vic Wertz.

Flanagan took over as the Lions' starting center as a rookie in 1965 and held the position for the next ten years. From 1965 to 1974, he started 139 games for the Lions, including a streak of 129 consecutive games. He was selected to play in the Pro Bowl four times, in 1969, 1970, 1971 and 1973. He was also selected as a second-team All-NFL player by the Newspaper Enterprise Association in 1969 and Pro Football Writers of America in 1970.

Flanagan developed a rivalry with Chicago Bears linebacker Dick Butkus, and recalled Butkus as his "greatest challenge". He was quoted in 1973 calling Butkus "a wild man on defense . . . one of the most foul-mouthed guys in the league . . . he insults you, your mother, and the team." Flanagan also claimed that Butkus "would spit down the back of his neck".

In May 1975, Flanagan signed with the San Diego Chargers. At the time, he said he was "happy to be back home in my native state", but emphasized that he had been treated well by the Lions and was leaving under "happy circumstances". He was the Chargers' starting center in 1975 and 1976, starting in 25 of the 26 games he played.

In July 1977, Flanagan was traded by the Chargers to the Los Angeles Rams. However, he was released on waivers by the Rams in early September 1977 prior to the start of the regular season.

== Coaching career ==
In 1984, Flanagan was hired as the offensive line coach for the Oakland Invaders of the United States Football League. In 1985, he was hired as the line coach for the Arizona Rattlers of the Arena Football League. As of 2013, he was an assistant coach with the Cedar Rapids Titans of the Indoor Football League.

== Personal life ==
Flanagan had four children; Edward, Meghan, Ryan and Dan. He was married to his wife Tina for 32 years and had one child (Dan Flanagan).

Flanagan was hospitalized in Altoona with heart problems on May 8, 2023, and died on May 10, aged 79.
