= Karl Noonan =

American football player (born 1944)

No. 89
- Position: Wide receiver

Personal information
- Born: February 17, 1944 (age 82); Dubuque, Iowa, U.S.

Career information
- College: Iowa
- NFL draft: 1966: undrafted

Career history
- Miami Dolphins (1966–1972)

Awards and highlights
- Super Bowl champion (VII); AFL All-Star (1968); AFL receiving touchdowns co-leader (1968); First-team All-American (1964); First-team All-Big Ten (1964)

Career NFL statistics
- Receptions: 136
- Receiving yards: 1,798
- Receiving touchdowns: 17
- Stats at Pro Football Reference

Karl Paul Noonan (born February 17, 1944) is an American former professional football player who was a wide receiver for the Miami Dolphins of the American Football League (AFL) and National Football League (NFL). As a high school football player at Assumption High School in Davenport (where one of his classmates was future Princeton All-American linebacker Stas Maliszewski). Noonan played college football for the Iowa Hawkeyes before playing professionally with Miami in the AFL from 1966 through 1969, and for the NFL's Dolphins from 1970 through 1972.

Noonan had his one peak season with 1968, his third year. After combining for just 365 yards in eight combined starts the past two seasons, he caught 58 passes for 760 yards while having a league-leading eleven touchdowns. He was an AFL All-Star that season. In 1972 he separated his shoulder in the preseason recovering a bad snap while serving as the team's holder. He was not activated even after recovering, although he assisted the coaching staff through Super Bowl VII from the press box analyzing the opposing defense. He announced his retirement prior to the 1973 season.

== See also ==
- List of American Football League players
