= Jerry Rush =

American football player (born 1942)

No. 82
- Position: Defensive tackle

Personal information
- Born: August 7, 1942 (age 84); Pontiac, Michigan, U.S.
- Listed height: 6 ft 4 in (1.93 m)
- Listed weight: 265 lb (120 kg)

Career information
- High school: Pontiac Central
- College: Michigan State (1961-1964)
- NFL draft: 1965: 2nd round, 25th overall pick
- AFL draft: 1965: 1st round, 7th overall pick

Career history
- Detroit Lions (1965–1971); Cleveland Browns (1972)*
- * Offseason or practice squad member only

Awards and highlights
- Second-team All-American (1964); First-team All-Big Ten (1964)

Career NFL statistics
- Fumble recoveries: 3
- Sacks: 26
- Stats at Pro Football Reference

Gerald Mitchell Rush (born August 7, 1942) is an American former professional football player who was a defensive tackle in the National Football League (NFL). He was selected by the Detroit Lions in the second round of the 1965 NFL draft. He played college football for the Michigan State Spartans. He played his entire career with the Lions, retiring during training camp before the 1972 season.
