= Tom Nowatzke =

American football player (born 1942)

- Nowatzke, 1970

No. 35, 34
- Positions: Fullback, Linebacker

Personal information
- Born: September 30, 1942 (age 84); La Porte, Indiana, U.S.
- Listed height: 6 ft 3 in (1.91 m)
- Listed weight: 230 lb (104 kg)

Career information
- High school: Michigan City (IN)
- College: Indiana
- NFL draft: 1965: 1st round, 11th overall pick
- AFL draft: 1965: 1st round, 4th overall pick

Career history
- Detroit Lions (1965–1969); Baltimore Colts (1970–1972)

Awards and highlights
- Super Bowl champion (V); First-team All-American (1964); 2× First-team All-Big Ten (1963, 1964)

Career NFL statistics
- Rushing yards: 1,249
- Rushing average: 3.5
- Receptions: 100
- Receiving yards: 605
- Total touchdowns: 17
- Stats at Pro Football Reference

Thomas Matthew Nowatzke (born September 30, 1942) is an American former professional football player who was a fullback in the National Football League (NFL) from 1965 to 1972. Nowatzke played for the Detroit Lions from 1965 to 1969 and the Baltimore Colts from 1970 to 1972. He played college football at Indiana.

== Early life ==
Nowatzke was born on September 30, 1942, in La Porte, Indiana, to Oscar and Cellia Nowatzke, the second of six children. He was raised on a farm outside of Michigan City, Indiana. He attended Elston High School in Michigan City (now Michigan City High School). He was on the football, baseball, and track teams. He was the captain of the football team, and its Most Valuable Player. He was All-Conference and All-State in football and basketball. Nowatzke graduated in 1961, and then went on to attend Indiana University (IU) where he played college football.

== College career ==
Nowatzke played running back, linebacker, and placekicker at IU. In 1962, he was back up to All-American and future NFL player Marv Woodson. In his junior year, he led the Big Ten in rushing, and scored 73 points, an IU record at the time. In 1963, he kicked five field goals in a game, a new school record. He was selected All-Big Ten twice (first team in 1964), and was voted First Team All-American by the American Football Coaches Association in his senior year, despite playing on a 2–7 Hoosiers team. He played in the East-West Shrine Game, the College All-Star Game, and Coaches All-American Game his senior year. He received the Balfour Award for Athletic Excellence twice.

Nowatzke graduated in 1965 with a Bachelor's degree in Business Management. In 1986, he was inducted into Indiana Football Coaches Association Hall of Fame. In 1995, he was inducted into the Indiana University Athletics Hall of Fame.

== Professional career ==
The Detroit Lions selected Nowatzke in the first round with the 11th overall pick in the 1965 NFL draft. He was also selected in the first round of the 1965 AFL draft by the New York Jets, but chose to play in the NFL with the Lions.

Nowatzke played five years with the Lions (1965–1969). In 1966, he rushed for 512 yards in 151 attempts, to go along with 54 pass receptions for 316 yards. Those numbers decreased significantly the following three years, especially with the addition of Miller Farr in the backfield; until 1969 when Nowatzke had no rushing attempts or receptions, and played in only nine games on special teams. He also had been injured in 1968, and in 1969 suffered a vertebra fracture in the neck (requiring two weeks in the hospital) when Detroit's coach was trying him out at middle linebacker in the pre-season. He was released by the Lions before the start of the 1970 season.

The Baltimore Colts were the only team willing to give Nowatzke a tryout in 1970, and they signed him to the practice squad as a backup linebacker, not a running back. Five games into the 1970 season, the Colts needed running backs and gave Nowatzke an opportunity. He started every game at running back the rest of the season, and scored the winning touchdown in the AFC East title game. He threw a key block in the Colts AFC championship win over the Oakland Raiders.

The Colts next game was Super Bowl V. Nowatzke rushed for 33 yards (a team high), and caught a 45-yard pass. On his most important play, late in the game he rushed for the touchdown that tied the game (with the extra-point made). The Colts would go on to win the game after a Mike Curtis interception with less than two minutes to play, and a field goal by Colts kicker Jim O'Brien with five seconds to play. He received the Colts Unsung Hero Award from a vote of his Colts' teammates.

In 1971, the Colts regained their running back corps, and did not need Nowatzke's services as a runner again, and played him sparingly at linebacker. After the 1972 season, the team released him, and he retired.

== Post-football career ==
After retiring, he ran a truck and trailer repair shop in Whitmore Lake, Michigan. He also bought the Clark Equipment Company, Brown Trailer Division in Detroit, and became a Great Dane dealer, one of the largest truck-trailer manufacturers in the United States. He is a cousin of former BYU wide receiver Tim Nowatzke.

He was inducted into the National Polish-American Sports Hall of Fame in 2008.
