= 1961 Maryland Terrapins football team =

American college football season

1961 Maryland Terrapins football
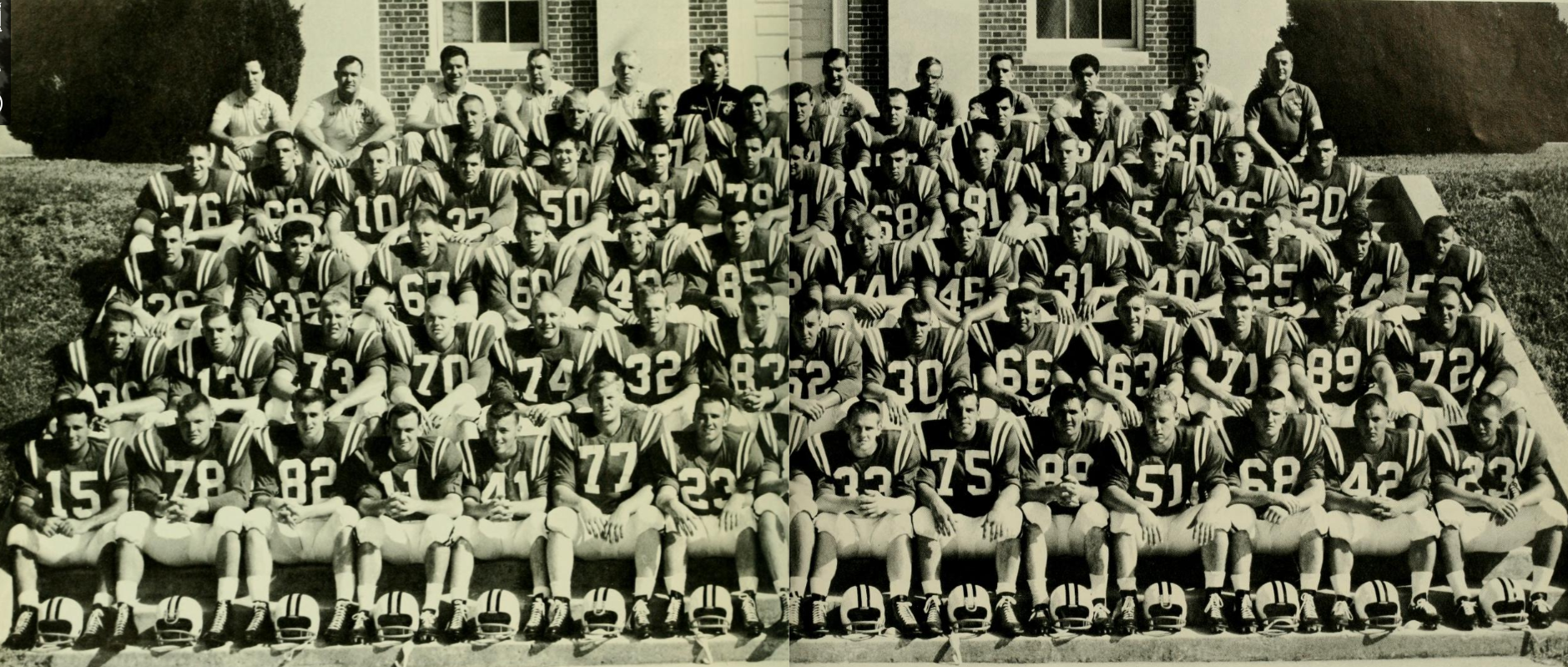
- Team portrait from 1962 Terrapin yearbook
- Conference: Atlantic Coast Conference
- Record: 7–3 (3–3 ACC)
- Head coach: Tom Nugent (3rd season)
- Home stadium: Byrd Stadium

1961 Atlantic Coast Conference football standings
	Conf.			Overall
Team	W		L	W		L
No. 20 Duke $	5	–	1	7	–	3
North Carolina	4	–	3	5	–	5
Maryland	3	–	3	7	–	3
Clemson	3	–	3	5	–	5
NC State	3	–	4	4	–	6
South Carolina	3	–	4	4	–	6
Wake Forest	3	–	4	4	–	6
Virginia	2	–	4	4	–	6
$ – Conference champion; Rankings from AP poll

The 1961 Maryland Terrapins football team was an American football team that represented the University of Maryland as a member of the Atlantic Coast Conference (ACC) during the 1961 college football season. In their third season under head coach Tom Nugent, the Terrapins compiled a 7–3 record (3–3 in conference games), finished in third place in the ACC, and outscored their opponents 156 to 141.

Senior end Gary Collins, a consensus pick on the 1961 All-America football team, tallied 30 catches for 428 yards and was selected in the first round, fourth overall pick, of the 1962 NFL draft. Quarterback Dick Shiner led the team, and ranked third in the ACC, with 1,022 yards of total offense.

== Schedule ==
Date	Opponent	Rank	Site	Result	Attendance	Source
September 23	at SMU*		Cotton Bowl; Dallas, TX	W 14–6	17,000	
September 30	at Clemson		Memorial Stadium; Clemson, SC	W 24–21	28,000	
October 7	No. 7 Syracuse*		Byrd Stadium; College Park, MD	W 22–21	35,000	
October 14	North Carolina	No. 10	Byrd Stadium; College Park, MD	L 8–14	23,000	
October 21	at Air Force*		DU Stadium; Denver, CO	W 21–0	21,500	
October 28	at South Carolina		Carolina Stadium; Columbia, SC	L 10–20	19,000	
November 4	Penn State*		Byrd Stadium; College Park, MD (rivalry)	W 21–17	39,000	
November 11	NC State		Byrd Stadium; College Park, MD	W 10–7	25,000	
November 18	Wake Forest		Byrd Stadium; College Park, MD	W 10–7	24,000	
November 25	at Virginia		Scott Stadium; Charlottesville, VA (rivalry)	L 16–28	19,000	
*Non-conference game; Rankings from AP Poll released prior to the game

== Statistics ==
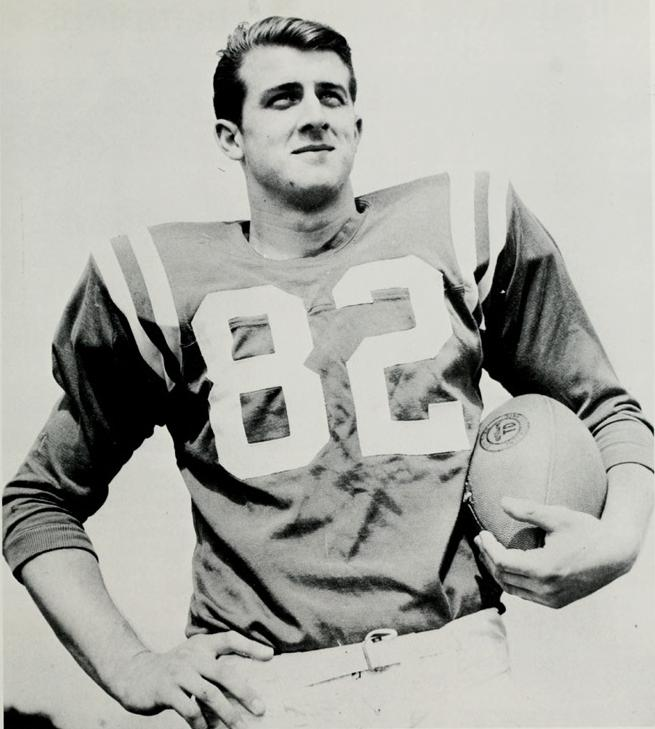
All-American Gary Collins

The 1961 Terrapins gained an average of 146.4 passing yards and 123.1 rushing yards per game. On defense, they gave up an average of 97.2 passing yards and 161.5 rushing yards per game.

Quarterback Dick Shiner led the team on offense, completing 58 of 111 passes (52.3%) for 921 yards with seven touchdowns, eleven interceptions, and a 122.9 quarterback rating. Shiner also had 101 rushing yards and ranked third in the ACC with 1,022 yards of total offense. Quarterback Dick Novak added 487 passing yards (55-for-99). Novak also rushed for 187 yards and ranked eighth in the ACC with 674 yards of total offense.

The team's rushing leaders were Ernie Arizzi (369 yards on 78 carries, 4.7-yard average), Dennis Condie (236 yards on 68 carries, 3.5-yard average), and Dick Novak (187 yards on 50 carries, 3.7-yard average).

Maryland's All-American end Gary Collins led the team in receiving with 30 catches for 428 yards, a 14.3-yard average. The team's other leading receivers were Tom Brown (11 receptions, 232 yards, 21.1-yard average), Henry Poniatowski (15 receptions, 212 yards, 14.1-yard average), and Murnis Banner (7 receptions, 123 yards, 17.6-yard average).

== Awards ==
Maryland end Gary Collins was a consensus pick on the 1962 All-America football team, receiving first-team honors from the American Football Coaches Association, Associated Press (AP), United Press International (UPI), Football Writers Association of America (FWAA), Newspaper Enterprise Association, Sporting News, and Time magazine, among others. Collins was drafted by the Cleveland Browns with the fourth overall pick in the first round of the 1962 NFL draft and played 10 years with the Browns, earning All-Pro honors three times and being selected as the most valuable player of the 1964 NFL Championship Game.

Four Maryland players received honors from the AP, UPI, or Atlantic Coast Sports Writers Association (ACSWA) on the 1961 All-Atlantic Coast Conference football team: Gary Collins at end (AP-1, UPI-1, ACSWA-1); center Bob Hacker (AP-1, ACSWA-1); tackle Roger Shoals (AP-2, UPI-2); and guard Bill Kirchiro (AP-2, UPI-2).

== Personnel ==
=== Players ===
- Ernie Arizzi - back, sophomore
- Murnis Banner - halfback
- Dick Barlund - end
- Tommy Brown - halfback, sophomore
- Gary Collins - end
- Rex Collins - fullback
- Dennis Condie - halfback, 160 pounds
- Dave Crossan - tackle, 230 pounds
- Jim Davidson - halfback and co-captain
- Pat Drass - fullback, senior
- Gene Feher - center
- Bob Hacker - center and co-captain, senior, 6'0", 200 pounds
- Bill Kirchiro - guard, senior, 215 pounds
- Dick Novak - quarterback, senior, 170 pounds
- Henry Poinatowski (or Poniatowski) - end
- Walt Rock - guard
- Tom Sankovich, guard, senior, 200 pounds
- Dick Shiner - quarterback
- Roger Shoals - tackle, junior, 240 pounds

Pat Drass, the first-string fullback, and Don Van Reenam, a reserve eft halfback, were removed from the team on November 7, 1961, for disciplinary reasons related to an "improper attitude with the coaching staff."

=== Coaches and administrators ===
- Head coach: Tom Nugent
- Assistant coaches: Lee Corso, Bernie Reid, Frank Toomey, Roland Arrigoni, Alf Satterfield, Bill Dovell, Carroll Huntress
- Athletic director: William W. Cobey
- Head trainer: Alfred J. Wyre
