= 1961 Virginia Cavaliers football team =

American college football season

1961 Virginia Cavaliers football
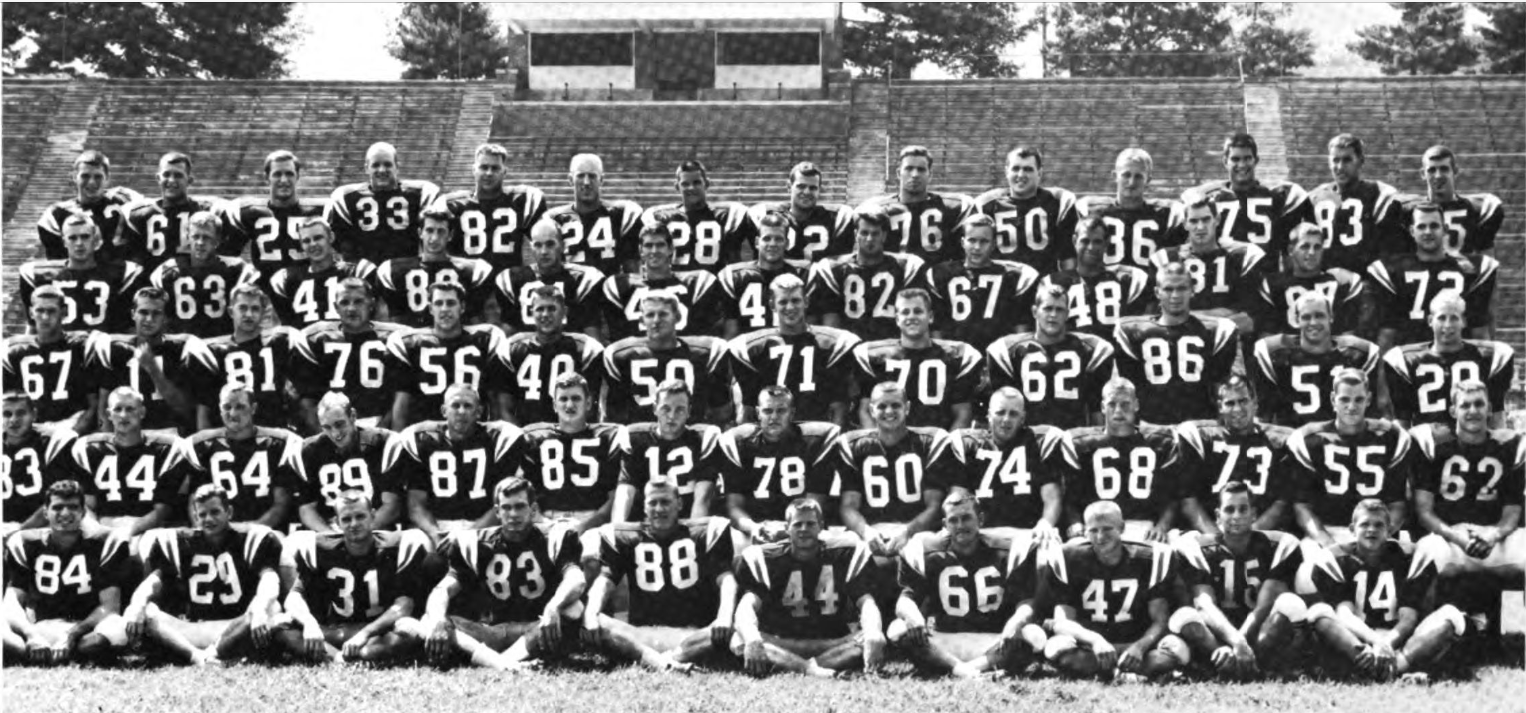
- Conference: Atlantic Coast Conference
- Record: 4–6 (2–4 ACC)
- Head coach: Bill Elias (1st season)
- Captains: Louis Martig; Ron Gassert
- Home stadium: Scott Stadium

1961 Atlantic Coast Conference football standings
	Conf.			Overall
Team	W		L	W		L
No. 20 Duke $	5	–	1	7	–	3
North Carolina	4	–	3	5	–	5
Maryland	3	–	3	7	–	3
Clemson	3	–	3	5	–	5
NC State	3	–	4	4	–	6
South Carolina	3	–	4	4	–	6
Wake Forest	3	–	4	4	–	6
Virginia	2	–	4	4	–	6
$ – Conference champion; Rankings from AP poll

The 1961 Virginia Cavaliers football team was an American football team that represented the University of Virginia as a member of the Atlantic Coast Conference (ACC) during the 1961 college football season. In their first year under head coach Bill Elias, the Cavaliers compiled a 4–6 record (2–4 in conference games), were outscored by a total of 190 to 123, and finished in eighth place out of eight teams in the ACC. Despite the last place finish, Elias was named ACC Coach of the Year, becoming the second in conference history to win the award in a coach's first year at the school. Elias, who had been the Southern Conference Coach of the Year the previous season at George Washington, snapped Virginia's 28-game losing streak by beating William & Mary in the first game of the season. Their win against South Carolina snapped an 18-game losing streak against ACC foes.

The team's statistical leaders included junior quarterback Gary Cuozzo (382 passing yards) and sophomore halfback Doug Thomson (294 rushing yards).

The team played its home games at Scott Stadium in Charlottesville, Virginia.

== Schedule ==
Date	Opponent	Site	Result	Attendance	Source
September 23	William & Mary*	Scott Stadium; Charlottesville, VA	W 21–6	18,000	
September 30	vs. Duke	City Stadium; Richmond, VA (Tobacco Bowl)	L 0–42	20,000	
October 7	NC State^{†}	Scott Stadium; Charlottesville, VA	L 14–21	16,000	
October 14	vs. VMI*	Foreman Field; Norfolk, VA	W 14–7	8,500	
October 21	vs. Virginia Tech*	Victory Stadium; Roanoke, VA (Harvest Bowl, rivalry)	L 0–20	17,000	
October 28	at Wake Forest	Bowman Gray Stadium; Winston-Salem, NC	L 15–21	7,500	
November 4	South Carolina	Scott Stadium; Charlottesville, VA	W 28–20	18,000	
November 18	at Navy*	Navy–Marine Corps Memorial Stadium; Annapolis, MD	L 3–13	23,565	
November 25	Maryland	Scott Stadium; Charlottesville, VA (rivalry)	W 28–16	19,000	
December 2	at North Carolina	Kenan Memorial Stadium; Chapel Hill, NC (South's Oldest Rivalry)	L 0–24	28,000	
*Non-conference game; ^{†}Homecoming

== Statistics ==
Gary Cuozzo and Stanford Fischer both saw significant action at quarterback. Cuozzo completed 42 of 93 passes (45.2%) for 382 yards with five touchdowns, three interceptions, and a 91.0 quarterback rating. Fischer completed 27 of 69 passes (39.1%) for 361 yards with one touchdown, eight interceptions, and a 64.7 quarterback rating.

The Cavaliers had six players who rushed for over 100 yards, led by Doug Thomson (294 yards, 70 carries, 4.2-yard average); Tony Ulehla (190 yards, 54 carries, 3.5-yard average); Bobby Freeman (187 yards, 62 carries, 3.0-yard average); and Ted Rzempoluch (162 yards, 48 carries, 3.4-yard average).

The leading receivers were Carl Kuhn (six receptions, 87 yards) and Tony Ulehla (nine receptions, 85 yards).

== Awards and honors ==
Though Virginia finished in last place in the ACC, Bill Elias was selected by the ACC Sportswriters Association as the ACC Coach of the Year. He was credited with turning the Virginia football program around after a 28-game losing streak dating back to 1958.

Senior guard Louis Martig and senior tackle Ron Gassert were selected as the team co-captains. Gassert was selected by the Associated Press and United Press International as a second-team player on the 1961 All-Atlantic Coast Conference football team.

== Personnel ==
=== Players ===
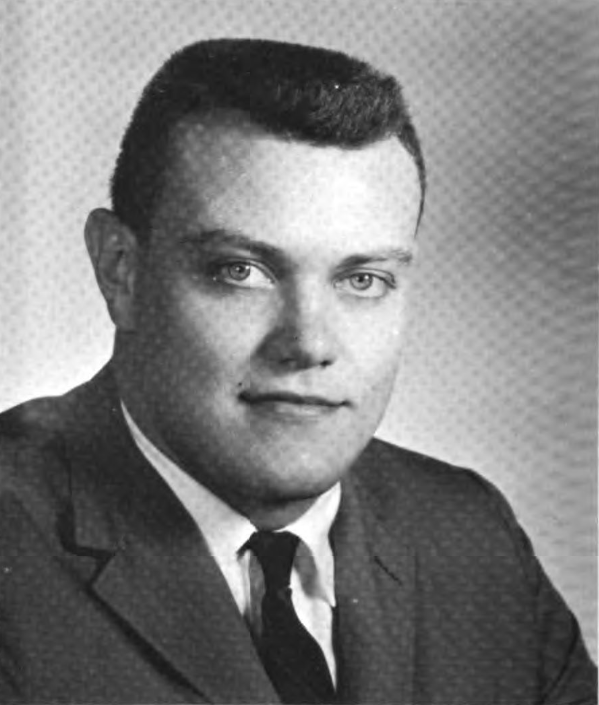
Tackle and co-captain Ron Gassert

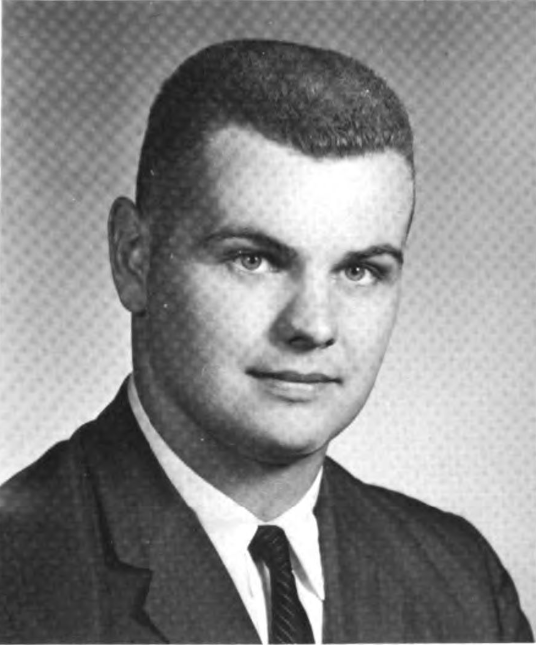
Guard and co-captain Louis Martig

- Dennis Andrews (#80), end, junior, 6'5", 208 pounds, Huntington, Long Island, NY
- Gary Cuozzo (#11), quarterback, junior, 6'1", 187 pounds, Glen Ridge, NJ
- Stanford Fischer, quarterback, junior, 6'0", Kempsville, VA
- Bobby Freeman, halfback, junior, 5'11", 182 pounds, Richmond, VA
- Ron Gassert (#77), tackle and co-captain, senior, 6'3", 235 pounds, Mt. Holly, NJ
- Dave Graham (#76), tackle, 235 pounds
- Tom Griggs, fullback, junior, 6'0", 190 pounds, Richmond, VA
- John Hepler (#40), halfback, sophomore, 5'11", 175 pounds, Winchester, VA
- William Kanto, tackle, senior, 6'1", 220 pounds, Norton, VA
- Joe Kehoe, end, junior, 6'2", 187 pounds, Wharton, NJ
- Carl Kuhn (#42), halfback, junior, 5'11", 177 pounds, Lancaster, PA
- Louis Martig, guard and co-captain, senior, 5'10", 202 pounds, Pittsburgh, PA
- Myron McWilliams, end, sophomore, 6'1", 200 pounds, Blades, DE
- Edward Menzer (#85), end, senior, 6'1", 197 pounds, Memphis, TN
- Andy Moran (#51), center, 6'0", 210 pounds, Syracuse, NY
- Robert Rowley (#62), guard, junior, 6'1", 210 pounds, Cumberland, MD
- Ted Rzempoluch (#21), halfback, junior, 6'1", 182 pounds, Cliffside Park, NJ
- Terry Sieg, halfback, sophomore, 6'1", 185 pounds, Rumson, NJ
- Emory Thomas (#68), guard, senior, 6'0", 200 pounds, Richmond, VA
- Doug Thomson, halfback, sophomore, 5'11", 186 pounds, Baltimore, MD
- Tony Ulehla, halfback, senior, 6'0", 188 pounds, Belcamp, MD
- Willis Williams (#38), fullback, junior, 5'10", 180 pounds, Elmira, NY

=== Coaches and administration ===
- Head coach: Bill Elias
- Assistant coaches: Bill Neal, Al Carapella, Hayden Buckley, Ralph Humphreys, Zeke Fantino
- Athletic director: Gus Tebell
