= 1961 South Carolina Gamecocks football team =

American college football season

1961 South Carolina Gamecocks football
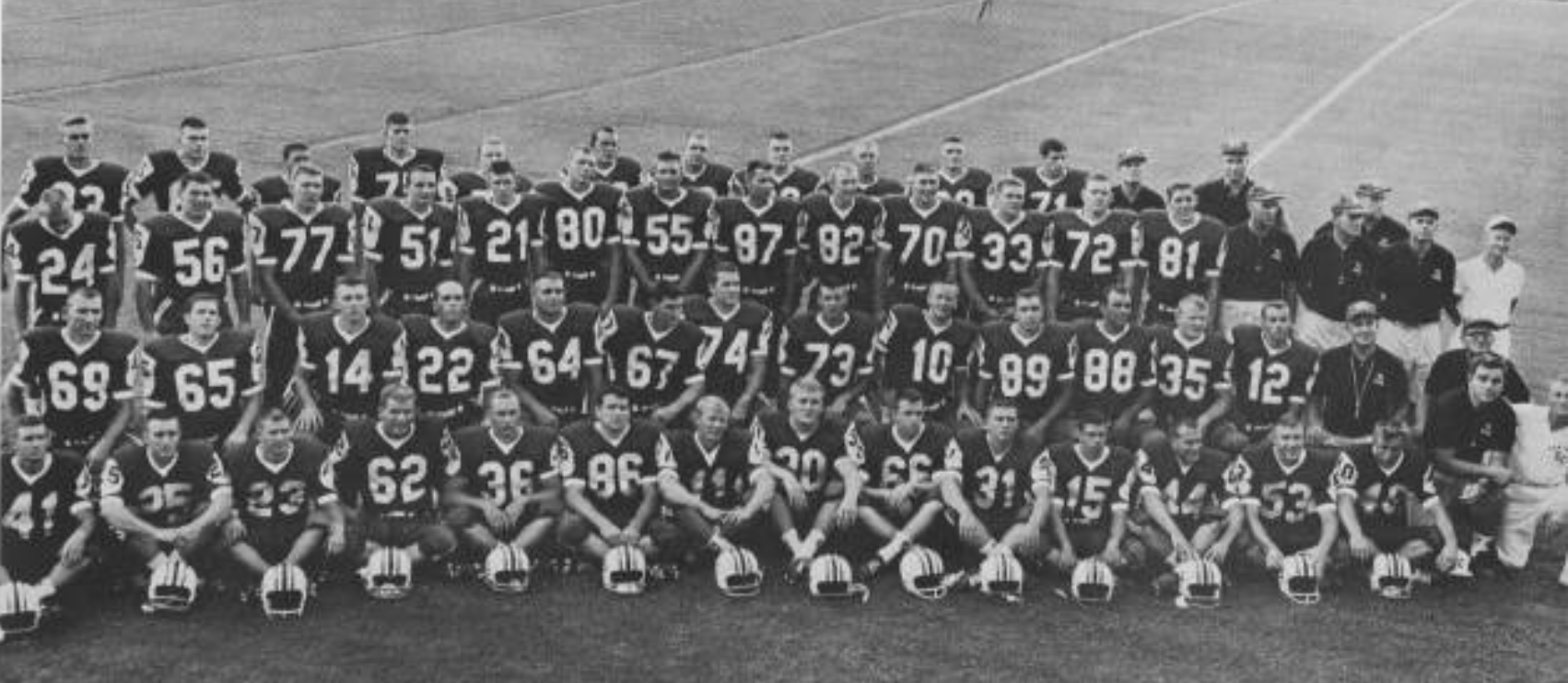
- Conference: Atlantic Coast Conference
- Record: 4–6 (3–4 ACC)
- Head coach: Marvin Bass (1st season)
- Captains: Dave Adam; Dave Sowell
- Home stadium: Carolina Stadium

1961 Atlantic Coast Conference football standings
	Conf.			Overall
Team	W		L	W		L
No. 20 Duke $	5	–	1	7	–	3
North Carolina	4	–	3	5	–	5
Maryland	3	–	3	7	–	3
Clemson	3	–	3	5	–	5
NC State	3	–	4	4	–	6
South Carolina	3	–	4	4	–	6
Wake Forest	3	–	4	4	–	6
Virginia	2	–	4	4	–	6
$ – Conference champion; Rankings from AP poll

The 1961 South Carolina Gamecocks football team was an American football team that represented the University of South Carolina as a member of the Atlantic Coast Conference (ACC) during the 1961 college football season. In their first of five years under head coach Marvin Bass, the Gamecocks compiled a 4–6 record (3–4 in conference games), finished in a three-way tie for fifth place in the ACC, and were outscored by a total of 187 to 128.

South Carolina's 21–14 upset victory over in-state rival Clemson, including Jim Costen's fumble recovery and 27-yard return for touchdown, was chosen as the biggest amateur sporting event of 1961 in South Carolina. After the season, coach Bass said the team did not have the "depth, size or experience" to compete with most of its opponents, but "had great morale, 110 per cent performances and more mental and physical guts than any coach has a right to expect."

The team's statistical leaders included quarterback Jim Costen (764 passing yards, second most in the ACC), Dick Day (400 rushing yards, second most in the ACC), and John Caskey (309 receiving yards). Tackle Jim Moss was selected as the ACC's lineman of the year for 1961. Guard Dave Adams and quarterback Dave Sowell were the team captains.

The team played its home games at Carolina Stadium in Columbia, South Carolina.

== Schedule ==
Date	Opponent	Site	Result	Attendance	Source
September 23	Duke	Carolina Stadium; Columbia, SC	L 6–7	35,000	
September 30	at Wake Forest	Bowman Gray Stadium; Winston-Salem, NC	W 10–7	12,000	
October 7	at Georgia*	Sanford Stadium; Athens, Georgia (rivalry)	L 14–17	30,000	
October 14	LSU*	Carolina Stadium; Columbia, SC	L 0–42	28,000	
October 21	North Carolina	Carolina Stadium; Columbia, SC (rivalry)	L 0–17	16,000	
October 28	Maryland	Carolina Stadium; Columbia, SC	W 20–10	19,000	
November 4	at Virginia	Scott Stadium; Charlottesville, VA	L 20–28	18,000	
November 11	Clemson	Carolina Stadium; Columbia, SC (rivalry)	W 21–14	44,000	
November 18	at NC State	Riddick Stadium; Raleigh, NC	L 14–38	16,000	
November 25	at Vanderbilt*	Dudley Field; Nashville, TN	W 23–7	12,500	
*Non-conference game

== Statistics ==
The team tallied 2,348 yards of total offense, consisting of 1,374 rushing yards (137.4 per game) and 974 passing yards (97.4 per game).

Quarterback Jim Costen completed 61 of 146 passes (41.8%) for 764 yards, three touchdowns, nine interceptions, and an 80.2 quarterback rating. He ranked second in the ACC in passing yards behind Roman Gabriel. He also rushed for 151 yards on 72 carries (2.1 yards per carry), giving him 937 yards of total offense.

Fullback Dick Day led the team, and ranked second in the ACC, with 400 rushing yards on 100 carries, an average of 4.0 yards per carry.

Halfback Billy Gambrell led the team in scoring with 32 points on five touchdowns and two point-after-touchdown kicks. Gambrell ranked second on the team and sixth in the ACC with 327 rushing yards on 75 carries for an average of 4.4 yards per carry. He also led the team in receptions with 24, tallying 241 yards and 10.0 yards per reception. He also completed two passes for 44 yards, giving him a combined 614 yards of rushing, receiving and passing yards.

End John Caskey led the team in passing yards with 309 on 16 carries for an average of 19.3 yards per reception.

Dean Findley was the team's kicker, tallying 24 points on four field goals and 12 point-after-touchdown kicks.

Sammy Anderson led the team in punt returns, having three returns for 117 yards, an average fo 39.0 yards per return.

== Awards and honors ==
Guard Dave Adams and quarterback Dave Sowell were selected as the team captains.

Junior tackle Jim Moss was the only South Carolina player named to the first team on the 1961 All-Atlantic Coast Conference football team. Moss was also selected as the ACC's lineman of the year for 1961. Halfback Billy Gambrell received second team All-ACC honors.

Moss also received 110 out of a possible 115 points in the voting for the 1961 South Carolina all-state football team. Also selected to the first team were halfback Billy Gambrell (100 points) and end John Caskey. Center Dick Lomas and back Dick May were named to the second team.

Quarterback Jim Costen was selected as a defensive back by the Washington Redskins in the 14th round of the 1962 NFL draft.

== Personnel ==
=== Players ===
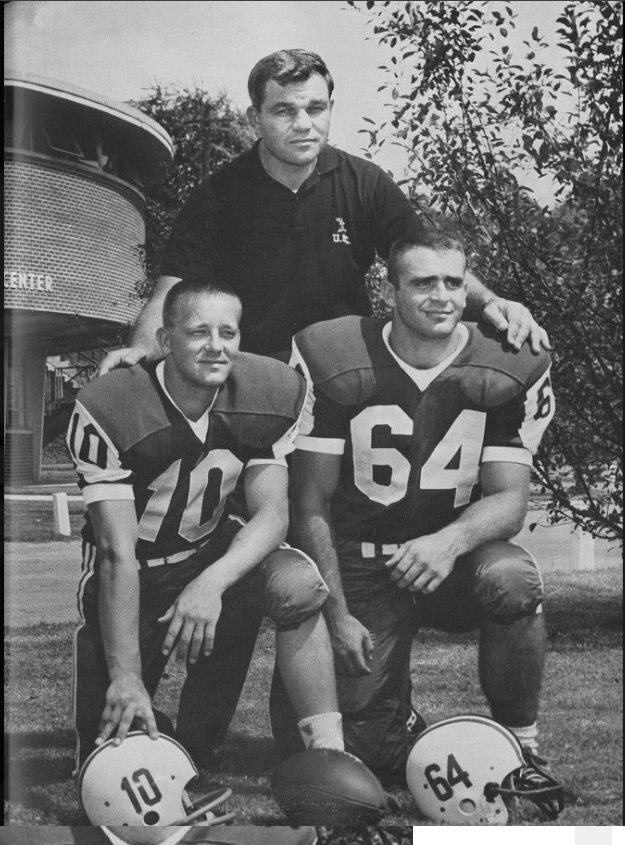
Head coach Marvin Bass with co-captains Dave Sowell and Dave Adams

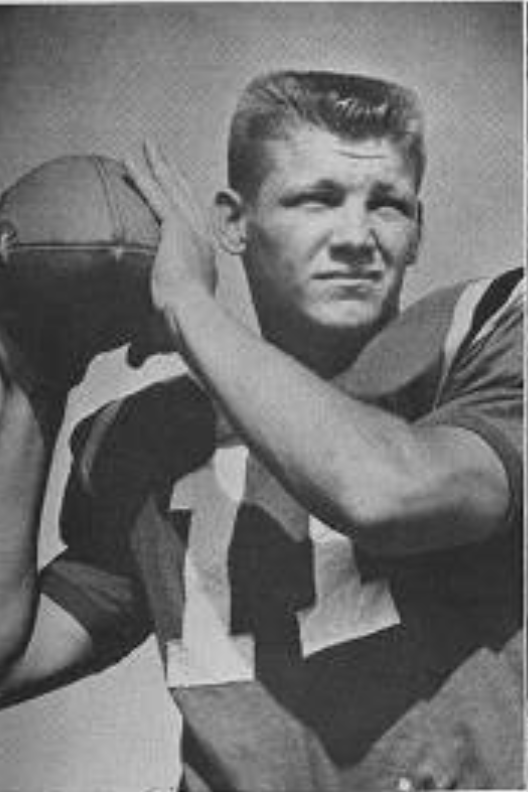
Quarterback Jim Costen

- Dave Adams, guard and co-captain, 6'1", 195 pounds, senior
- Sammy Anderson, halfback and punt returns, 5'9", 160 pounds, sophomore, North Augusta, SC
- John Caskey, end, 6'1", 195 pounds, junior, Columbia, SC
- Jim Costen, quarterback, 6'0", 180 pounds, senior, Myrtle Beach, SC
- Henry Crosby, halfback, 5'8", 157 pounds, senior
- Dick Day, fullback, 6'0", 190 pounds, junior, North Augusta, SC
- Bob Drost, end, 6'4", 220 pounds, senior
- Dean Findley, end and placekicker, junior, Anderson, SC
- Billy Gambrell, halfback, 5'10", junior, Athens, GA
- Joel Goodrich, 6'2", 220 pounds, junior
- Carl Huggins, fullback, 6'0", 210 pounds, junior
- Harold Jones, guard, 6'0", 200 pounds, junior
- John Jones, guard, 6'2", 220 pounds
- Ken Lester, end, 6'2", 205 pounds, junior
- Dick Lomas, center, 6'0", 200 pounds, junior, Greenwood, SC
- Jack Morris, halfback, 5'11", 165 pounds, senior
- Jim Moss, tackle, 6'3", 205 pounds, junior
- Tommy Pilcher, quarterback, 5'9", 140 pounds, junior
- Dick Sowell, quarterback and co-captain, 6'0", 175 pounds, senior, Cheraw, SC
- Frank Staley, tackle, 6'2", 220 pounds, senior, North Augusta, SC
- Clark Waring, center, 6'1", 200 pounds, senior
- Charlie Williams, halfback, 5'8", 180 pounds, junior

=== Coaches ===
- Head coach: Marvin Bass
- Assistant coach: Ralph Floyd, Clyde Biggers
