= 1961 Duke Blue Devils football team =

American college football season

1961 Duke Blue Devils football
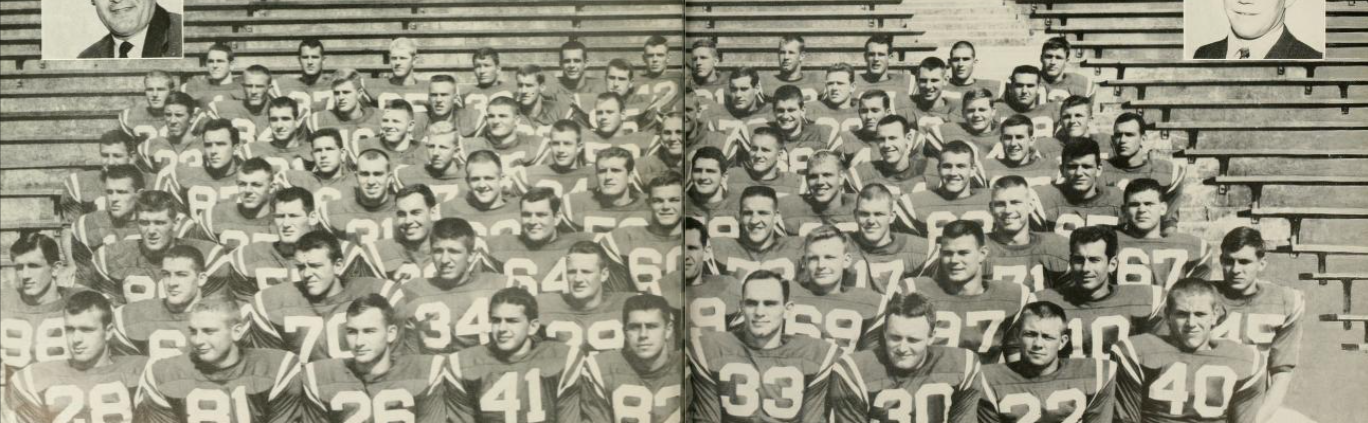
- Team portrait from 1962 Chanticleer

ACC champion
- Conference: Atlantic Coast Conference

Ranking
- Coaches: No. 14
- AP: No. 20
- Record: 7–3 (5–1 ACC)
- Head coach: Bill Murray (11th season)
- MVP: Dean Wright
- Captain: Jack Wilson
- Home stadium: Duke Stadium

1961 Atlantic Coast Conference football standings
	Conf.			Overall
Team	W		L	W		L
No. 20 Duke $	5	–	1	7	–	3
North Carolina	4	–	3	5	–	5
Maryland	3	–	3	7	–	3
Clemson	3	–	3	5	–	5
NC State	3	–	4	4	–	6
South Carolina	3	–	4	4	–	6
Wake Forest	3	–	4	4	–	6
Virginia	2	–	4	4	–	6
$ – Conference champion; Rankings from AP poll

The 1961 Duke Blue Devils football team was an American football team that represented Duke University as a member of the Atlantic Coast Conference (ACC) during the 1961 college football season. In their eleventh year under head coach Bill Murray, the Blue Devils compiled a 7–3 record (5–1 in conference games), won the ACC championship, and outscored opponents by a total of 183 to 106. In non-conference games, they defeated Navy and Notre Dame but lost to Georgia Tech and Michigan. They were ranked No. 14 in the final UPI coaches poll and No. 20 in the final AP writers poll.

The Blue Devils led the ACC in total defense, giving up 224.1 yards per game, and also led the conference in passing offense with 140.9 passing yards per game. Quarterback Walt Rappold led the team in passing (54-for-96 for 830 yards), and halfback Mark Leggett led the team in rushing (318 yards on 86 carries). Tackle Art Gregory and guard Jean Berry were consensus first-team picks on the 1961 All-Atlantic Coast Conference football team.

Duke played its home games at Duke Stadium in Durham, North Carolina.

== Schedule ==
Date	Opponent	Site	Result	Attendance	Source
September 23	at South Carolina	Carolina Stadium; Columbia, SC	W 7–6	35,000	
September 30	vs. Virginia	City Stadium; Richmond, VA (Tobacco Bowl)	W 42–0	20,000	
October 7	Wake Forest	Duke Stadium; Durham, NC (rivalry)	W 23–3	20,000	
October 14	at Georgia Tech*	Grant Field; Atlanta, GA	L 0–21	44,015	
October 21	Clemson^{†}	Duke Stadium; Durham, NC	L 7–17	30,000	
October 28	at NC State	Riddick Stadium; Raleigh, NC (rivalry)	W 17–6	21,800	
November 4	at Michigan*	Michigan Stadium; Ann Arbor, MI	L 14–28	56,488	
November 11	vs. Navy*	Foreman Field; Norfolk, VA (Oyster Bowl)	W 30–9	32,000–32,127	
November 18	North Carolina	Duke Stadium; Durham, NC (Victory Bell)	W 6–3	41,000	
December 2	Notre Dame*	Duke Stadium; Durham, NC	W 37–13	35,000	
*Non-conference game; ^{†}Homecoming

== Statistics ==
Duke ranked second in the ACC in total offense (307.5 yards per game) and led the conference in passing offense (140.9 yards per game). On defense, the Blue Devils ranked first in total defense (giving up 224.1 yards per game).

Quarterback Walt Rappold led the team in passing, completing 54 of 96 passes (.563 completion) for 830 yards with seven touchdowns and five interceptions for a 142.5 quarterback rating. He ranked fourth in the ACC in total offense (1,012 yards) but led the conference in average gain per pass thrown (8.6 yards) and in average gain per play of total offense (7.2 yards).

Quarterback Gil Garner also contributed to Duke's passing offensecompleted 56 of 86 passes for 576 yards. Garner ranked 10th in the ACC with 617 yards of total offense.

Duke's leading rushers were Mark Leggett (318 yards, 86 carries, 3.7-yard average), Dean Wright (251 yards, 68 carries, 3.7-yard average), Dave Burch (220 yards, 49 carries, 4.5-yard average), Walt Rappold (182 yards, 45 carries, 4.0-yard average), and Joel Arrington (170 yards, 51 carries, 3.3-yard average).

The team's leading receivers were Stan Crisson (241 yards, 20 receptions, 2 touchdowns), Jay Wilkinson (208 yards, 12 receptions, 2 touchdowns), Mark Leggett (185 yards, 12 receptions, 2 touchdowns), Pete Widener (182 yards, 17 receptions, 1 touchdown), Jack Wilson (168 yards, 9 receptions, 1 touchdown), and Dean Wright (131 yards, 15 receptions, 0 touchdowns).

Three players tied for the team's leadership in scoring. Billy Futrell, Dave Burch, and Mark Leggett each had 18 points on three touchdowns.

== Awards ==
Tackle Art Gregory received the annual ACC Jacobs Blocking Trophy presented byt the Atlantic Coast Sports Writers Association (ACSWA). Head coach Bill Murray called Gregory "the best blocker I have ever had at Duke."

Four Duke players were recognized by the Associated Press (AP), United Press International (UPI), and/or the Atlantic Coast Sports Writers Association (ACSWA) on the 1961 All-Atlantic Coast Conference football team: tackle Art Gregory (AP-1, UPI-1, ACSWA-1); guard Jean Berry (AP-1, UPI-1, ACSWA-1); halfback Mark Leggett (UPI-1, AP-2); and quarterback Walt Rappold (AP-2).

== Personnel ==
=== Players ===
- Joel Arrington, halfback, senior, 6'1", 190 pounds
- Paul Bengel, center, junior, 6'1", 198 pounds
- Jean Berry, guard, junior, 6'0", 212 pounds
- Dave Burch, fullback, senior, 6'0", 188 pounds
- Randy Clark, quarterback, senior, 6'1", 185 pounds
- Dave Condon, tackle, junior, 6'1", 212 pounds
- Stan Crisson, swing-end, sophomore, 6'2", 194 pounds
- Gil Garner, quarterback, junior, 6'0", 175 pounds
- Dan Gelbert, end, senior, 6'0", 191 pounds
- Art Gregory, tackle, junior, 6'3", 212 pounds
- Dick Havens, tackle, junior, 5'11', 203 pounds
- Mark Leggett, halfback, junior, 5'10", 169 pounds
- Johnny Markas, guard, junior, 5'11", 196 pounds
- Fred McCollum, tackle, junior, 6'2", 207 pounds
- Walt Rappold, quarterback, junior, 6'3", 202 pounds
- John Tinnell, fullback, senior, 6'3", 207 pounds
- Dave Unser, alternate captain and end, senior, 5'10", 185 pounds
- Pete Widener, swing-end, junior, 6'2", 189 pounds
- Jay Wilkinson, swing-end, sophomore, 6'1", 180 pounds (son of Bud Wilkinson)
- Ken Williams, center, junior, 5'11", 192 pounds
- Jack Wilson, captain and halfback, senior, 6'1", 183 pounds
- Dean Wright, halfback, senior, 5'11", 186 pounds

==== Gallery ====
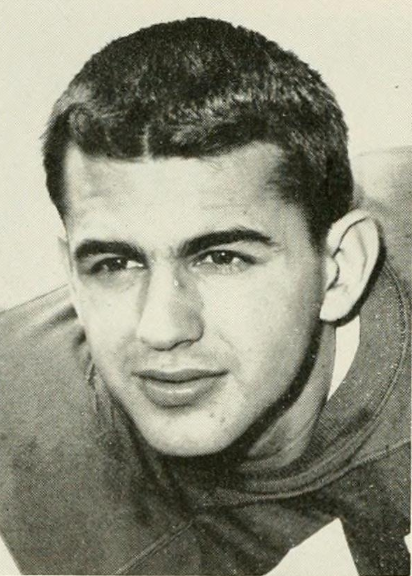
Captain Jack Wilson

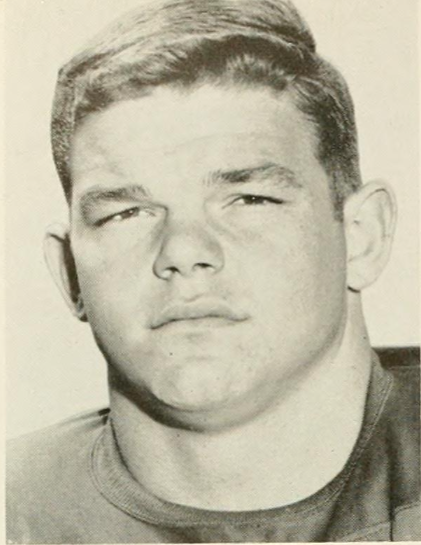
All-ACC guard Jean Berry

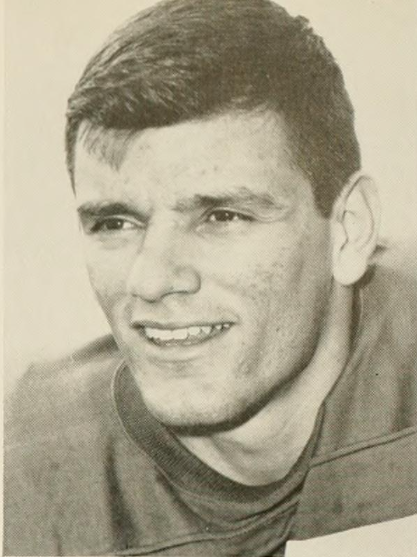
All-ACC tackle Art Gregory

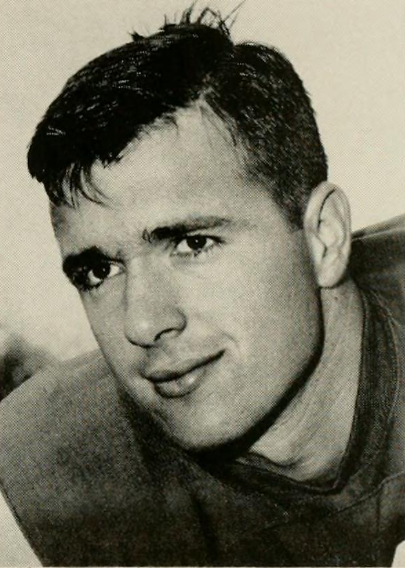
Halfback/MVP Dean Wright

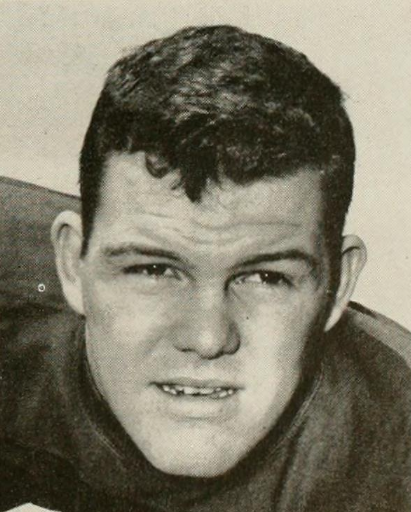
Quarterback Walt Rappold

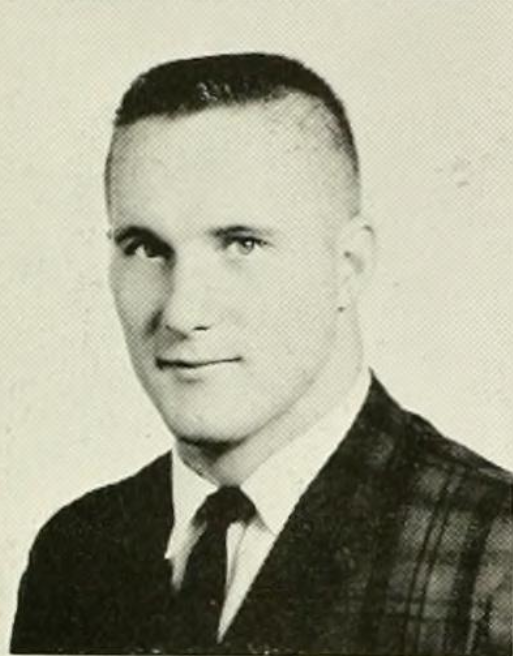
Halfback Mark Leggett

=== Coaches ===
- Head coach - Bill Murray
- Assistant coaches

- Ace Parker - offensive backfield coach
- Ted Youngling - offensive line coach
- Marty Pierson - offensive end coach
- Carmen Falcone - defensive backfield coach
- Herschel Caldwell - defensive ends coach
- Doug Knotts - defensive line coach
- Bob Cox - freshman football coach

- Head trainer - Bob Chambers

==== Gallery ====
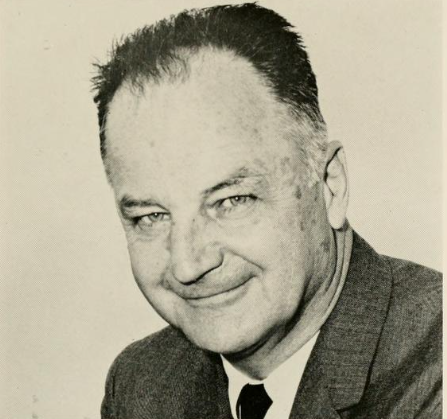
Head coach Bill Murray

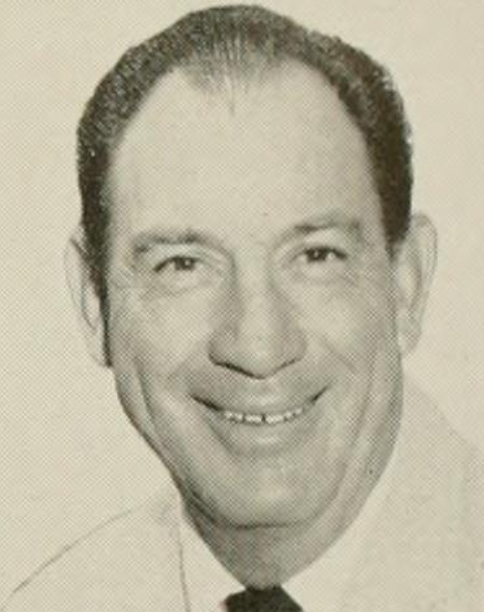
Offensive backfield coach Ace Parker

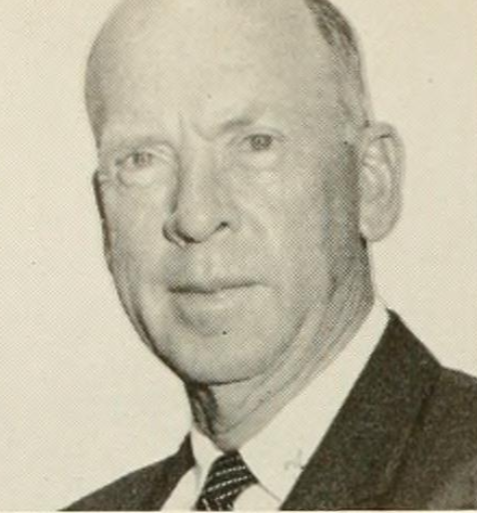
Defensive ends coach Herschel Caldwell
