= 1961 Wake Forest Demon Deacons football team =

American college football season

1961 Wake Forest Demon Deacons football
- Conference: Atlantic Coast Conference
- Record: 4–6 (3–4 ACC)
- Head coach: Bill Hildebrand (2nd season)
- Captain: Charles Reiley
- Home stadium: Bowman Gray Stadium

1961 Atlantic Coast Conference football standings
	Conf.			Overall
Team	W		L	W		L
No. 20 Duke $	5	–	1	7	–	3
North Carolina	4	–	3	5	–	5
Maryland	3	–	3	7	–	3
Clemson	3	–	3	5	–	5
NC State	3	–	4	4	–	6
South Carolina	3	–	4	4	–	6
Wake Forest	3	–	4	4	–	6
Virginia	2	–	4	4	–	6
$ – Conference champion; Rankings from AP poll

The 1961 Wake Forest Demon Deacons football team was an American football team that represented Wake Forest University during the 1961 college football season. In its second season under head coach Bill Hildebrand, the team compiled a 4–6 record and finished in seventh place in the Atlantic Coast Conference (ACC).

Halfback Alan White was selected by the Associated Press as a first-team player on the 1961 All-Atlantic Coast Conference football team.

== Schedule ==
Date	Opponent	Site	Result	Attendance	Source
September 23	at Baylor*	Baylor Stadium; Waco, TX	L 0–31	28,000	
September 30	South Carolina	Bowman Gray Stadium; Winston-Salem, NC	L 7–10	12,000	
October 7	at Duke	Duke Stadium; Durham, NC (rivalry)	L 3–23	20,000	
October 14	at Clemson	Memorial Stadium; Clemson, SC	W 17–13	26,000	
October 21	at NC State	Riddick Stadium; Raleigh, NC (rivalry)	L 0–7	16,000	
October 28	Virginia	Bowman Gray Stadium; Winston-Salem, NC	W 21–15	7,500	
November 4	at Auburn*	Cliff Hare Stadium; Auburn, AL	L 7–21	20,000	
November 11	Virginia Tech*	Bowman Gray Stadium; Winston-Salem, NC	W 24–15	8,000	
November 18	at Maryland	Bryd Stadium; College Park, MD	L 7–10	24,000	
November 25	North Carolina	Bowman Gray Stadium; Winston-Salem, NC (rivalry)	W 17–14	11,000	
*Non-conference game

== Team leaders ==
Category	Team Leader	Att/Cth	Yds
Passing	Chuck Reiley	32/88	516
Rushing	Alan White	93	586
Receiving	Donnie Frederick	11	237
