= 1964 Virginia Tech Gobblers football team =

American college football season

1964 Virginia Tech Gobblers football
- Conference: Southern Conference
- Record: 6–4 (3–1 SoCon)
- Head coach: Jerry Claiborne (4th season)
- Home stadium: Miles Stadium

1964 Southern Conference football standings
	Conf.					Overall
Team	W		L		T	W		L		T
West Virginia $	5	–	0	–	0	7	–	4	–	0
Virginia Tech	3	–	1	–	0	6	–	4	–	0
George Washington	3	–	2	–	0	5	–	4	–	0
The Citadel	4	–	3	–	0	4	–	6	–	0
William & Mary	4	–	3	–	0	4	–	6	–	0
Richmond	2	–	4	–	0	3	–	7	–	0
Davidson	1	–	3	–	0	3	–	6	–	0
Furman	1	–	4	–	0	3	–	7	–	0
VMI	1	–	4	–	0	1	–	9	–	0
$ – Conference champion

The 1964 Virginia Tech Gobblers football team represented the Virginia Polytechnic Institute or VPI (now known as Virginia Polytechnic Institute and State University or Virginia Tech) as a member of the Southern Conference (SoCon) during the 1964 NCAA University Division football season. Led by fourth-year head coach Jerry Claiborne the Gobblers compiled an overall record of 6–4 with a mark of 3–1 in conference play, and finished second in the SoCon. VPI played home games at Miles Stadium in Blacksburg, Virginia.

== Schedule ==
Date	Opponent	Site	Result	Attendance	Source
September 19	at Tampa*	Phillips Field; Tampa, FL	W 18–14	7,300	
September 26	vs. Wake Forest*	Victory Stadium; Roanoke, VA (Harvest Bowl)	L 21–38	21,000	
October 3	at Virginia*	Scott Stadium; Charlottesville, VA (rivalry)	L 17–20	23,500	
October 10	George Washington	Miles Stadium; Blacksburg, VA	W 33–0	11,000	
October 17	West Virginia	Miles Stadium; Blacksburg, VA (rivalry)	L 10–23	13,500	
October 24	No. 10 Florida State*^{†}	Miles Stadium; Blacksburg, VA	W 20–11	22,000	
October 31	at William & Mary	Cary Field; Williamsburg, VA	W 27–20	11,000	
November 7	NC State*	Miles Stadium; Blacksburg, VA	W 28–19	11,500	
November 14	at Syracuse*	Archbold Stadium; Syracuse, NY	L 15–20	24,000	
November 26	vs. VMI	Victory Stadium; Roanoke, VA (rivalry)	W 35–13	25,000	
*Non-conference game; ^{†}Homecoming; Rankings from AP Poll released prior to the game

== Roster ==
The following players were members of the 1964 football team according to the roster published in the 1965 edition of The Bugle, the Virginia Tech yearbook.

VPI 1964 roster
Dick Anderson; Darryl Bailey; Jay Barfield; Judson Bigelow; Joe Bloomer; Andy Bowling; Donnie Bruce; Eddie Bulheller; Robert Carr Churchill; Paul Frederick Cobb; Dickie Cranwell; Bill Edwards; Lacy Lee Edwards, Jr.; Jack Evan; David Lowell Farmer; Rusty Fife; Tommy Francisco; Sal Garcia; Bill Gordon	Bob Griffith; Tommy Groom; Les Hanly; Wayne Hewitt; Tom Hidell; Wynston Holbrook; Michael Joseph Hvozdovic; Ed Jeffrey; Basil G. Jennings; Erick Johnson; Lynn Jones; Bill Kegley; Dickie Kelly; Victor "Vic" William Kreiter, Jr.; Ronnie Lindon; Tommy Marvin; Ronald Lee McGuigan; Claude Earl Messamore, Jr.; Milton E. Miller	Richard Mollo; Bobby Owens; Darrell Page; Mike Price; John Raible; James John Reba; Fred Michael Saunders; Bob Schweickert; John Sheehy; John George Shipley; James Simmons; Tommy Stafford; Douglas Lee Ulery; Silas Alexander "Sonny" Utz, III; Raleigh Voight; Jack Wenderoch; Ken Whitley; Sands Woody
