= 1961 North Carolina Tar Heels football team =

American college football season

1961 North Carolina Tar Heels football
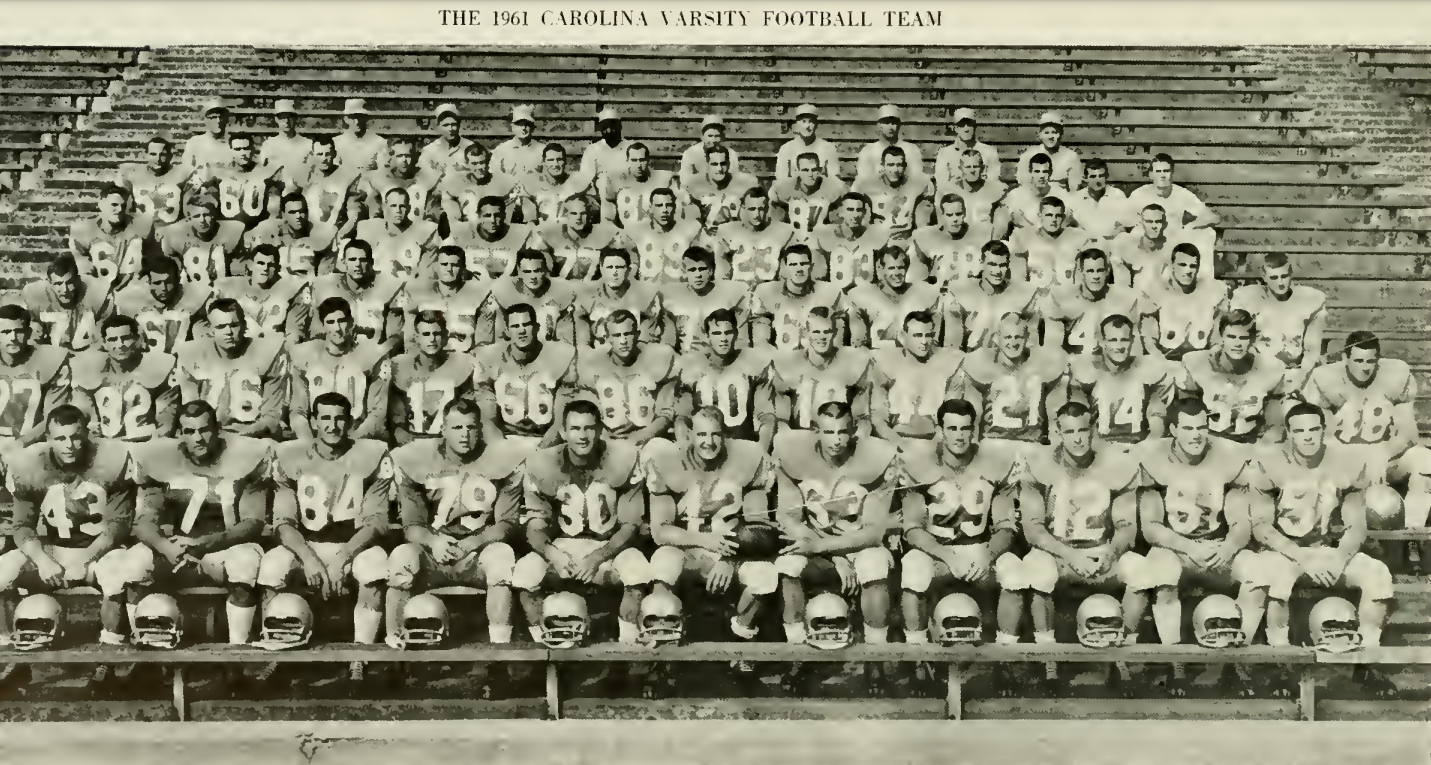
- 1961 team portrait from The Yackety Yack yearbook
- Conference: Atlantic Coast Conference
- Record: 5–5 (4–3 ACC)
- Head coach: Jim Hickey (3rd season)
- Captains: Bob Elliott; Jim LeCompte
- Home stadium: Kenan Memorial Stadium

1961 Atlantic Coast Conference football standings
| | Conf. | | | Overall |
| Team | W | | L | W | | L |
|---|---|---|---|---|---|---|
| No. 20 Duke $ | 5 | – | 1 | 7 | – | 3 |
| North Carolina | 4 | – | 3 | 5 | – | 5 |
| Maryland | 3 | – | 3 | 7 | – | 3 |
| Clemson | 3 | – | 3 | 5 | – | 5 |
| NC State | 3 | – | 4 | 4 | – | 6 |
| South Carolina | 3 | – | 4 | 4 | – | 6 |
| Wake Forest | 3 | – | 4 | 4 | – | 6 |
| Virginia | 2 | – | 4 | 4 | – | 6 |
$ – Conference champion; Rankings from AP poll

The 1961 North Carolina Tar Heels football team was an American football team that represented the University of North Carolina (now known as University of North Carolina at Chapel Hill) as a member of the Atlantic Coast Conference (ACC) during the 1961 college football season. In their third year under head coach Jim Hickey, the Tar Heels compiled a 5–5 record (4–3 in conference games), finished second in the ACC, and were outscored by a total of 141 to 121.

Quarterback Ray Farris broke North Carolina single-season records for passes attempted and completed and became the third player in ACC history to complete two years with 1,000 yards of total offense. Gib Carson led the team, and ranked second in the ACC, with 406 rushing yards and also ranked second in the ACC with 311 yards on kick returns.

The team played its home games at Kenan Memorial Stadium in Chapel Hill, North Carolina.

== Schedule ==
| Date | Time | Opponent | Site | Result | Attendance | Source |
|---|---|---|---|---|---|---|
| September 30 | 2:00 p.m. | NC State | Kenan Memorial Stadium; Chapel Hill, NC (rivalry) | W 27–22 | 44,000 | |
| October 7 | 2:00 p.m. | Clemson | Kenan Memorial Stadium; Chapel Hill, NC | L 0–27 | 26,000 | |
| October 14 | 2:00 p.m. | at No. 10 Maryland | Byrd Stadium; College Park, MD | W 14–8 | 27,000 | |
| October 21 | 2:00 p.m. | at South Carolina | Carolina Stadium; Columbia, SC (rivalry) | W 17–0 | 16,000 | |
| October 27 | 8:15 p.m. | at Miami (FL)* | Miami Orange Bowl; Miami, FL | L 0–10 | 29,612–29,671 | |
| November 4 | 2:00 p.m. | Tennessee* | Kenan Memorial Stadium; Chapel Hill, NC | W 22–21 | 35,000 | |
| November 11 | 2:00 p.m. | No. 4 LSU* | Kenan Memorial Stadium; Chapel Hill, NC | L 0–30 | 28,000 | |
| November 18 | 2:00 p.m. | at Duke | Duke Stadium; Durham, NC (Victory Bell) | L 3–6 | 41,000 | |
| November 25 | 2:00 p.m. | at Wake Forest | Bowman Gray Stadium; Winston-Salem, NC (rivalry) | L 14–17 | 11,000 | |
| December 2 | 2:00 p.m. | Virginia | Kenan Memorial Stadium; Chapel Hill, NC (South's Oldest Rivalry) | W 24–0 | 28,000 | |
*Non-conference game; Rankings from AP Poll released prior to the game; All times are in Eastern time

== Statistics ==
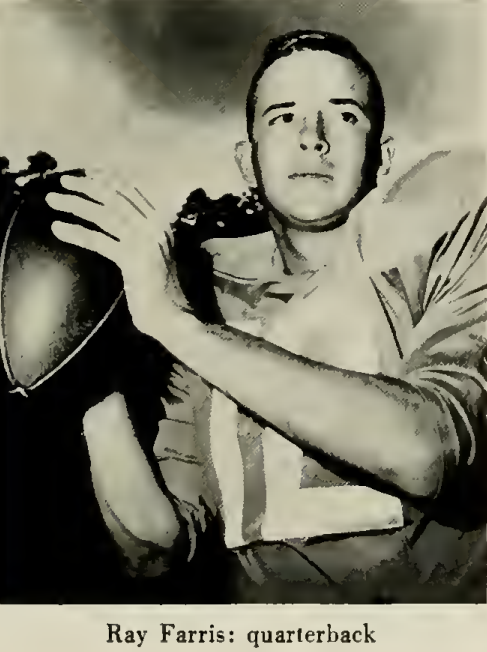
Quarterback Ray Farris

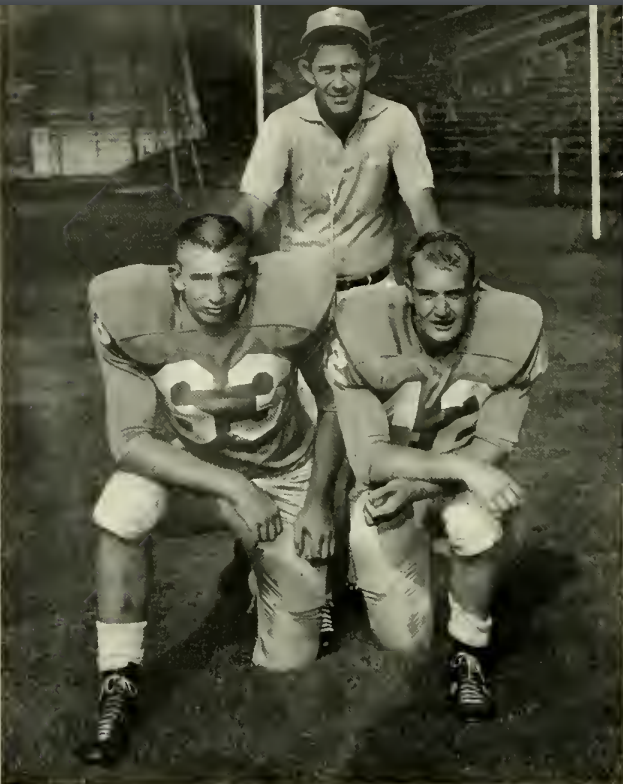
Jim Hickey with 1961 co-captains LeCompte and Elliott

The 1961 Tar Heels gained an average of 137.5 rushing yards and 88.0 passing yards per game. On defense, they gave up 147.4 rushing yards and 95.7 passing yards per game.

Quarterback Ray Farris completed 71 of 159 passes (44.7%) for 875 yards with two touchdowns, 11 interceptions, and an 81.2 quarterback rating. His 71 completions and 159 attempts both broke North Carolina single-season records. Farris also tallied 153 rushing yards to lead the team with 1,028 yards of total offense. He ranked second in the ACC, behind Roman Gabriel, in total offense. Farris closed his playing career in 1961 as the third player in ACC history to complete two years with 1,000 yards of total offense, the other two being Norm Snead and Roman Gabriel.

Gib Carson led the team, and ranked second in the ACC, with 406 rushing yards on 116 carries, a 3.5-yard average. Carson also ranked second in the ACC in kick-returning with 311 yards on 15 returns.

Fullback Bob Elliott ranked second on the team, and fifth in the ACC, with 361 rushing yards on 98 carries, a 3.7-yard average. Jim Addison tallied 265 yards on 86 carries for a 3.1-yard average.

The leading receivers were Roger Smith (9 catches, 170 yards), Bob Lacey (10 catches, 161 yards), Gib Carson (15 catches, 147 yards), Ward Marslender (nine receptions, 121 yards), and Jim Addison (16 catches, 110 yards).

Junior Edge led the team, and ranked second in the conference, with seven interceptions.

== Awards and honors ==
Jim LeCompte and Bob Elliott were selected as the team captains.

Five North Carolina players were honored by the AP, UPI, or Atlantic Coast Sports Writers Association (ACSWA) on the 1961 All-Atlantic Coast Conference football team: fullback Bob Elliott (AP-1, UPI-1, ACSWA-1); guard Jim LeCompte (AP-1, UPI-1, ACSWA-1); halfback Gib Carson (AP-1); back Ray Farris (AP-2, UPI-2); center Joe Carver (AP-2, UPI-2).
