= 1961 NC State Wolfpack football team =

American college football season

1961 NC State Wolfpack football
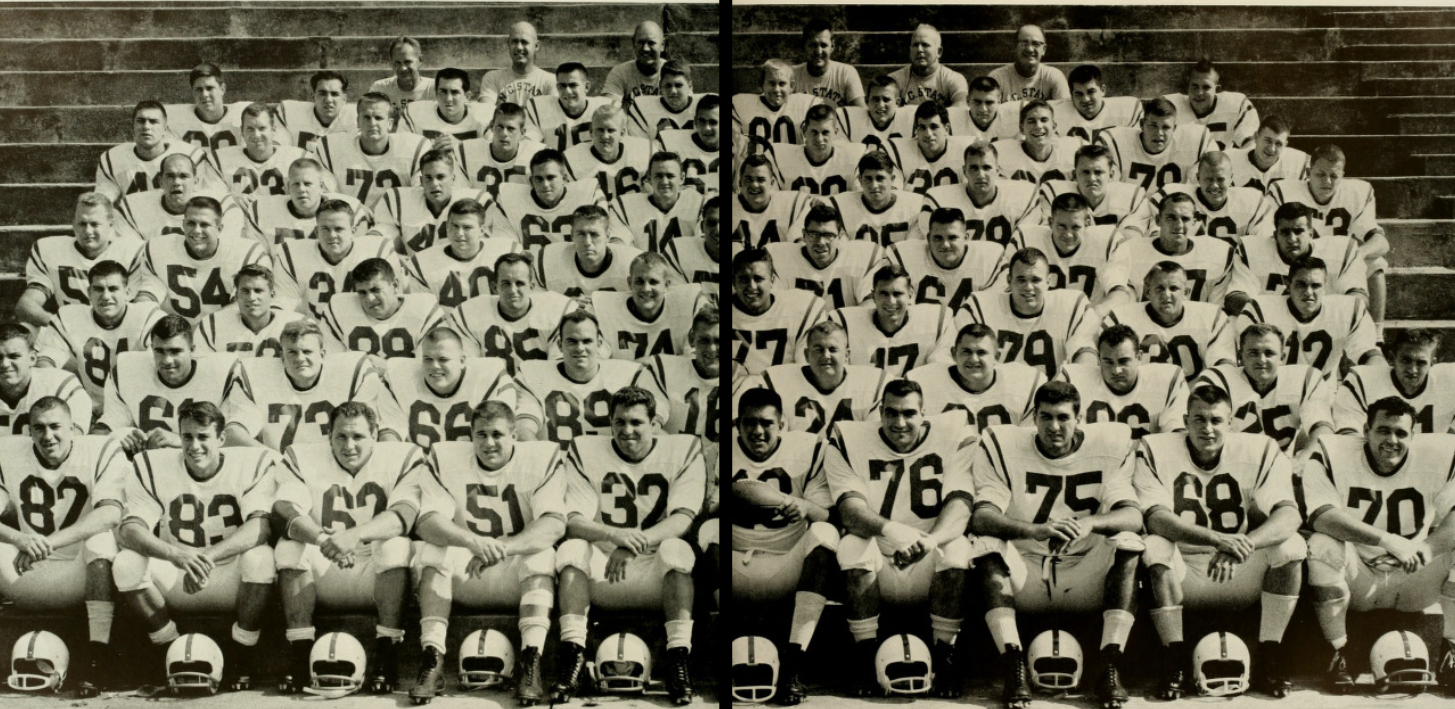
- Conference: Atlantic Coast Conference
- Record: 4–6 (3–4 ACC)
- Head coach: Earle Edwards (8th season)
- Captain: Roman Gabriel
- Home stadium: Riddick Stadium

1961 Atlantic Coast Conference football standings
	Conf.			Overall
Team	W		L	W		L
No. 20 Duke $	5	–	1	7	–	3
North Carolina	4	–	3	5	–	5
Maryland	3	–	3	7	–	3
Clemson	3	–	3	5	–	5
NC State	3	–	4	4	–	6
South Carolina	3	–	4	4	–	6
Wake Forest	3	–	4	4	–	6
Virginia	2	–	4	4	–	6
$ – Conference champion; Rankings from AP poll

The 1961 NC State Wolfpack football team was an American football team that represented North Carolina State University (NC State) as a member of the Atlantic Coast Conference (ACC) during the 1961 college football season. In their eighth year head coach Earle Edwards, the Wolfpack compiled a 4–6 record (3–4 in conference games), tied for fifth place in the ACC, and were outscored by a total of 149 to 129.

Senior quarterback Roman Gabriel set 22 NC State records, was selected as the 1961 ACC Player of the Year and a first-team All-American, and had his jersey retired (the first in program history) in a January 1962 ceremony. Gabriel was later inducted into the College Football Hall of Fame.

The team played its home games at Riddick Stadium in Raleigh, North Carolina.

== Schedule ==
Date	Opponent	Site	Result	Attendance	Source
September 23	at Wyoming*	War Memorial Stadium; Laramie, WY	L 14–15	17,301	
September 30	at North Carolina	Kenan Memorial Stadium; Chapel Hill, NC (rivalry)	L 22–27	44,000	
October 7	at Virginia	Scott Stadium; Charlottesville, VA	W 21–14	16,000	
October 14	at No. 3 Alabama*	Denny Stadium; Tuscaloosa, AL	L 7–26	30,000	
October 21	Wake Forest	Riddick Stadium; Raleigh, NC (rivalry)	W 7–0	16,000	
October 28	Duke	Riddick Stadium; Raleigh, NC (rivalry)	L 6–17	21,800	
November 4	at No. 8 (small) Mississippi Southern*	Ladd Stadium; Mobile, AL	W 7–6	13,000	
November 11	at Maryland	Byrd Stadium; College Park, MD	L 7–10	25,000	
November 18	South Carolina	Riddick Stadium; Raleigh, NC	W 38–14	16,000	
November 25	at Clemson	Memorial Stadium; Clemson, SC (rivalry)	L 0–20	23,000	
*Non-conference game; Rankings from AP Poll released prior to the game

== Statistics ==
The 1967 NC State Wolfpack gained an average of 123.7 rushing yards and 96.6 passing yards per game. On defense, they gave up an average of 192.8 rushing yards and 78.4 passing yards per game.

Roman Gabriel completed 99 of 186 passes (53.2%) for 937 passing yards with eight touchdowns, six interceptions, and a 103.3 quarterback rating. He also rushed for 196 yards and led the ACC with 1,133 yards of total offense. He set 22 NC State and nine ACC records.

The Wolfpack had five players who rushed for over 150 yards:

- Jim D'Antonio led the team with 232 yards on 47 carries for an average of 4.9 yards per carry.
- Roman Gabriel rushed for 196 yards on 97 carries for a 2.0-yard average.
- Joe Scarpati tallied 164 yards on 43 carries for a 3.8-yard average.
- Carson Bosher tallied 160 yards on 36 carries for a 4.4-yard average.
- Al Taylor gained 152 yards on 48 carries for a 3.2-yard average.

End Johnny Morris led the team with 325 receiving yards on 24 receptions for a 13.5-yard average.

== Awards and honors ==
Senior quarterback Roman Gabriel received multiple honors at the end of the 1961 season, including the following:

- Gabriel was chosen Player of the Year in the ACC for the second straight syear.
- Gabriel received first-team honors on the 1961 All-America college football team from the American Football Coaches Association (AFCA), the Football Writers Association of America (FWAA), and Time magazine. He received second-team honors from the Associated Press (AP) and United Press International (UPI).
- On January 20, 1962, NC State retired Gabriel's jersey No. 18 in a ceremony at halftime of an NC State basketball game in Raleigh, North Carolina. Governor Terry Sanford presented Gabriel with a replica of the jersey.

In 1989, Gabriel was inducted into the College Football Hall of Fame.

Two NC State player were honored on the 1961 All-Atlantic Coast Conference football team. Gabriel received first-team honors from the AP, UPI, and Atlantic Coast Sports Writers Association (ACSWA). End Johnny Morris received first-team honors from the AP and ACSWA.

== Personnel ==
=== Players ===
- Carson Bosher, wingback
- Joe Bushofsky, guard
- Mike Clark, wingback
- Jim D'Antonio, fullback
- Tom Dellinger, quarterback
- Roman Gabriel, quarterback and captain, senior 6'4", 220 pounds
- Tony Koszarsky, diveback
- Dennis Kroll, end, senior
- Walt Kudryan, center, junior
- Nick Maravich, tackle
- Johnny Morris, end
- Jim Scarpati, diveback
- Graham Singleton, guard
- Al Taylor, diveback
- Bert Wilder, tackle

=== Coaches ===
- Head coach: Earle Edwards
- Assistant coach: Pat Peppler, H. B. McCullough, Al Michaels, Bill Smaltz, Cary Brewbaker
