= 1961 Clemson Tigers football team =

American college football season

1961 Clemson Tigers football
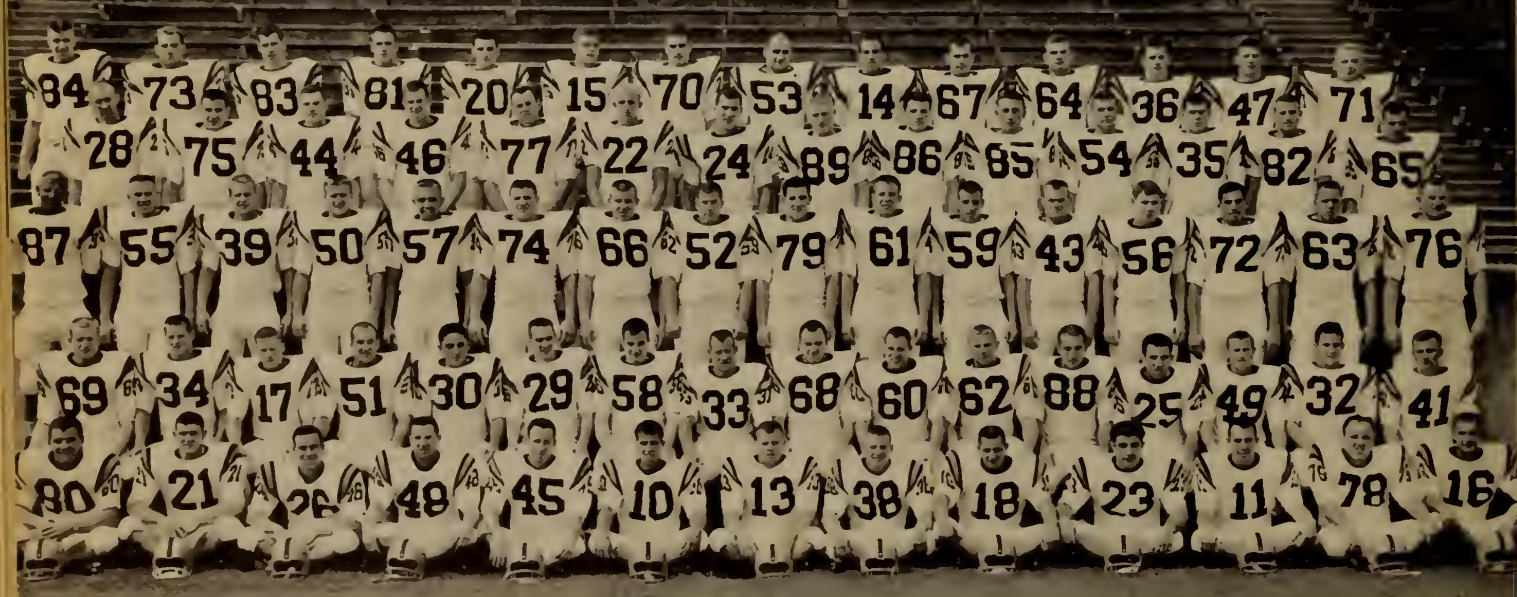
- Team portrait from Taps (Clemson yearbook)
- Conference: Atlantic Coast Conference
- Record: 5–5 (3–3 ACC)
- Head coach: Frank Howard (22nd season)
- Captains: Ron Andreo; Calvin West
- Home stadium: Memorial Stadium

1961 Atlantic Coast Conference football standings
	Conf.			Overall
Team	W		L	W		L
No. 20 Duke $	5	–	1	7	–	3
North Carolina	4	–	3	5	–	5
Maryland	3	–	3	7	–	3
Clemson	3	–	3	5	–	5
NC State	3	–	4	4	–	6
South Carolina	3	–	4	4	–	6
Wake Forest	3	–	4	4	–	6
Virginia	2	–	4	4	–	6
$ – Conference champion; Rankings from AP poll

The 1961 Clemson Tigers football team was an American football team that represented Clemson University as a member of the Atlantic Coast Conference (ACC) during the 1961 college football season. In their 22nd season under head coach Frank Howard, the Tigers compiled a 5–5 record (3–3 in conference games), tied for third place in the ACC, and outscored opponents by a total of 199 to 126.

Senior fullback Ron Scrudato led the ACC with 48 points scored. Sophomore quarterback Jim Parker led the team in passing (736 yards), total offense (975 yards) and led the ACC with an average gain of 16.0 yards per completion.

The team played its home games at Memorial Stadium in Clemson, South Carolina.

== Schedule ==
Date	Time	Opponent	Site	Result	Attendance	Source
September 23	2:00 p.m.	at Florida*	Florida Field; Gainesville, FL	L 17–21	42,000	
September 30	2:00 p.m.	Maryland	Memorial Stadium; Clemson, SC	L 21–24	28,000	
October 7	2:00 p.m.	at North Carolina	Kenan Memorial Stadium; Chapel Hill, NC	W 27–0	26,000	
October 14	2:00 p.m.	Wake Forest	Memorial Stadium; Clemson, SC	L 13–17	26,000	
October 21	2:00 p.m.	at Duke	Duke Stadium; Durham, NC	W 17–7	30,000	
October 28	3:00 p.m.	at Auburn*	Cliff Hare Stadium; Auburn, AL (rivalry)	L 14–24	36,000	
November 4	2:00 p.m.	Tulane*^{†}	Memorial Stadium; Clemson, SC	W 21–6		
November 11	2:00 p.m.	at South Carolina	Carolina Stadium; Columbia, SC (rivalry)	L 14–21	44,000	
November 18	2:00 p.m.	Furman*	Memorial Stadium; Clemson, SC	W 35–6	30,000	
November 25	2:00 p.m.	NC State	Memorial Stadium; Clemson, SC (rivalry)	W 20–0	23,000	
*Non-conference game; ^{†}Homecoming; All times are in Eastern time

== Statistics ==
The 1961 Clemson Tigers gained an average of 178.3 rushing yards and 129.2 passing yards per game. On defense, they allowed opponents to gain an average of 127.5 rushing yards and 126.5 passing yards per game.

Senior fullback Ron Scrudato led the ACC in scoring with 48 points on eight touchdowns. He also ranked sixth in the conference with 341 rushing yards.

The quarterback role was split between sophomore Jim Parker and junior Joe Anderson. Parker completed 46 of 98 passes (46.9%) for 736 yards with five touchdowns, nine interceptions and a 108.5 quarterback rating. Anderson completed 43 of 104 for 531 yards (41.3%) for 531 yards with two touchdowns, five interceptions and an 81.0 quarterback rating. Parker also led the team with 975 yards of total offense and led the ACC with an average gain of 16.0 yards per completion.

The Tigers had six backs who had over 55 carries during the 1961 season:

- Ron Scrudato gained 341 yards on 99 carries for a 3.4-yard average.
- Joe Anderson gained 310 yards on 97 carries for a 3.2-yard average.
- Elmo Lam gained 270 yards on 50 carries for a 5.4-yard average
- Jim Parker gained 239 yards on 68 carries for a 3.5-yard average.
- Bill McGuirt gained 235 yards on 69 carries for a 3.4-yard average.
- Wendall Black gained 191 yards on 56 carries for a 3.4-yard average.

The team had five players with at least 10 receptions:

- Gary Barnes had 16 receptions for 247 yards, a 15.4-yard average
- Elmo Lam had 17 receptions for 237 yards, a 13.9-yard average.
- Tommy King had 14 catches for 227 yards, a 16.2-yard average.
- Harry Pavilack had 10 receptions for 153 yards, a 15.3-yard average.
- Wendall Black had 11 receptions for 137 yards, a 12.5-yard average.

== Awards and honors ==
Center Ron Andreo and guard Calvin West were selected as the team captains.

Four Clemson players were recognized by one or more of the Associated Press (AP), United Press International (UPI), and the Atlantic Coast Sports Writers Association (ACSWA) on the 1961 All-Atlantic Coast Conference football team: end Tommy King (AP-1); center Ron Andreo (UPI-1); quarterback Jim Parker (AP-2, UPI-2, ACSWA-2); and guard Calvin West (AP-2, UPI-2, ACSWA-2).

== Personnel ==
=== Players ===
- Joe Anderson, quarterback, junior, 6'3", 201 pounds, Greenwood, SC
- Ron Andreo, center and co-captain, senior, 6'0", 196 pounds, Leechburg, PA
- Lon Armstrong, guard, senior, 6'0", 199 pounds, Eddystone, PA
- Gary Barnes, halfback, senior, 6'4", 190 pounds, Fairfax, SC
- Wendall Black, halfback, senior, 6'0", 198 pounds, Saluda, SC
- Bob Coleman, halfback, senior, 5'10", 166 pounds, Anderson, SC,
- Ronnie Crolley, end, senior, 6'2", 192 pounds, Columbia, SC
- Tommy Gue, guard
- Dave Hynes, tackle, junior, 6'1", 218 pounds, Atlanta, GA
- Jimmy King, tackle, senior, 6'3", 267 pounds, Anderson, SC
- Tommy King, end, senior, 6'1", 179 pounds, Atlanta, GA
- Elmo Lam, halfback, junior, 6'0", 170 pounds, Elkton, VA
- Milt McGuirt, fullback, junior, 6'1", 205 pounds, Lancaster, SC
- Ronnie Osborne, tackle, senior, 6'4", 270 pounds, Cleveland, GA
- Jim Parker, quarterback, sophomore, 6'1", 194 pounds, Haverford, PA
- Harry Pavilack, halfback, senior, 6'1", 197 pounds, Pittsburgh, PA
- Bob Poole, end, sophomore, 6'4", 205 pounds, Florence, AL
- Ron Scrudato, fullback, senior, 6'0", 200 pounds, Nutley, NJ
- Jerry Taylor, halfback, sophomore, 5'10", 189 pounds, Winnsboro, SC
- Jack Veronee, center, senior, 6'2", 205 pounds, Charleston Heights, SC
- Eddie Werntz, punter, junior, 6'0", 192 pounds, Savannah, GA
- Calvin West, guard and co-captain, senior, 6'1", 194 pounds, Kershaw, SC
- Fred Whittemore, tackle, sophomore, 6'1", 241 pounds, Forsyth, GA

=== Coaches ===
- Head coach: Frank Howard
- Assistant coaches: Charlie Waller (5th year, backfield), Bob Smith (9th year, interior line), Banks McFadden (defensive backfield), Don Wade (assistant to Smith), Covington McMillan (recruiting and freshmen), Whitey Jordan (assistant to McMillan)
- Athletic director: Frank Howard
