= 1964 Richmond Spiders football team =

American college football season

1964 Richmond Spiders football
- Conference: Southern Conference
- Record: 3–7 (2–4 SoCon)
- Head coach: Ed Merrick (14th season)
- Captains: Kenny Stoudt; Joe Stromick
- Home stadium: City Stadium

1964 Southern Conference football standings
| | Conf. | | | | | Overall |
| Team | W | | L | | T | W | | L | | T |
|---|---|---|---|---|---|---|---|---|---|---|
| West Virginia $ | 5 | – | 0 | – | 0 | 7 | – | 4 | – | 0 |
| Virginia Tech | 3 | – | 1 | – | 0 | 6 | – | 4 | – | 0 |
| George Washington | 3 | – | 2 | – | 0 | 5 | – | 4 | – | 0 |
| The Citadel | 4 | – | 3 | – | 0 | 4 | – | 6 | – | 0 |
| William & Mary | 4 | – | 3 | – | 0 | 4 | – | 6 | – | 0 |
| Richmond | 2 | – | 4 | – | 0 | 3 | – | 7 | – | 0 |
| Davidson | 1 | – | 3 | – | 0 | 3 | – | 6 | – | 0 |
| Furman | 1 | – | 4 | – | 0 | 3 | – | 7 | – | 0 |
| VMI | 1 | – | 4 | – | 0 | 1 | – | 9 | – | 0 |
$ – Conference champion

The 1964 Richmond Spiders football team was an American football team that represented the University of Richmond as a member of the Southern Conference (SoCon) during the 1964 NCAA University Division football season. In their fourteenth season under head coach Ed Merrick, Richmond compiled a 3–7 record, with a mark of 2–4 in conference play, finishing in sixth place in the SoCon.

== Schedule ==
| Date | Opponent | Site | Result | Attendance | Source |
|---|---|---|---|---|---|
| September 19 | West Virginia | City Stadium; Richmond, VA | L 10–20 | 12,000 | |
| September 25 | VMI | City Stadium; Richmond, VA (rivalry) | W 20–14 | | |
| October 3 | at Southern Miss* | Faulkner Field; Hattiesburg, MS | L 9–14 | 7,500 | |
| October 10 | at The Citadel | Johnson Hagood Stadium; Charleston, SC | L 0–33 | 10,200 | |
| October 17 | at Davidson | Richardson Stadium; Davidson, NC | W 20–7 | | |
| October 24 | at East Carolina* | Ficklen Memorial Stadium; Greenville, NC | W 22–20 | 13,000 | |
| October 31 | at Holy Cross* | Fitton Field; Worcester, MA | L 22–36 | 7,500 | |
| November 7 | at Buffalo* | Rotary Field; Buffalo, NY | L 13–28 | 8,007 | |
| November 14 | Furman | City Stadium; Richmond, VA | L 18–19 | 5,000 | |
| November 26 | William & Mary | City Stadium; Richmond, VA (rivalry) | L 13–33 | 10,500 | |
*Non-conference game
