= 1964 NC State Wolfpack football team =

American college football season

1964 NC State Wolfpack football

ACC champion
- Conference: Atlantic Coast Conference
- Record: 5–5 (5–2 ACC)
- Head coach: Earle Edwards (11th season)
- Home stadium: Riddick Stadium

1964 Atlantic Coast Conference football standings
	Conf.					Overall
Team	W		L		T	W		L		T
NC State $	5	–	2	–	0	5	–	5	–	0
Duke	3	–	2	–	1	4	–	5	–	1
Maryland	4	–	3	–	0	5	–	5	–	0
North Carolina	4	–	3	–	0	5	–	5	–	0
Wake Forest	4	–	3	–	0	5	–	5	–	0
South Carolina	2	–	3	–	1	3	–	5	–	2
Clemson	2	–	4	–	0	3	–	7	–	0
Virginia	1	–	5	–	0	5	–	5	–	0
$ – Conference champion; Rankings from AP Poll

The 1964 NC State Wolfpack football team represented North Carolina State University during the 1964 NCAA University Division football season. The Wolfpack were led by 11th-year head coach Earle Edwards and played their home games at Riddick Stadium in Raleigh, North Carolina. They competed as a member of the Atlantic Coast Conference, finishing as conference champions with a record of 5–2.

== Schedule ==
Date	Opponent	Site	Result	Attendance	Source
September 19	at North Carolina	Kenan Memorial Stadium; Chapel Hill, NC (rivalry)	W 14–13	45,500	
September 26	Clemson	Riddick Stadium; Raleigh, NC (rivalry)	W 9–0	17,500	
October 3	Maryland	Riddick Stadium; Raleigh, NC	W 14–13	14,500	
October 10	at No. 3 Alabama*	Denny Stadium; Tuscaloosa, AL	L 0–21	37,827	
October 17	at Duke	Duke Stadium; Durham, NC (rivalry)	L 3–35	34,000	
October 24	at Virginia	Scott Stadium; Charlottesville, VA	W 24–15	20,100	
October 31	South Carolina	Riddick Stadium; Raleigh, NC	W 17–14	21,000	
November 7	at Virginia Tech*	Miles Stadium; Blacksburg, VA	L 19–28	11,500	
November 14	at Florida State*	Doak Campbell Stadium; Tallahassee, FL	L 6–28	24,250	
November 20	at Wake Forest	Bowman Gray Stadium; Winston-Salem, NC (rivalry)	L 13–27	17,300	
*Non-conference game; Rankings from AP Poll released prior to the game
