= 1964 South Carolina Gamecocks football team =

American college football season

1964 South Carolina Gamecocks football
- Conference: Atlantic Coast Conference
- Record: 3–5–2 (2–3–1 ACC)
- Head coach: Marvin Bass (4th season)
- Captains: Steve Cox; Jim Johnson; Pete Divenere
- Home stadium: Carolina Stadium

1964 Atlantic Coast Conference football standings
	Conf.					Overall
Team	W		L		T	W		L		T
NC State $	5	–	2	–	0	5	–	5	–	0
Duke	3	–	2	–	1	4	–	5	–	1
Maryland	4	–	3	–	0	5	–	5	–	0
North Carolina	4	–	3	–	0	5	–	5	–	0
Wake Forest	4	–	3	–	0	5	–	5	–	0
South Carolina	2	–	3	–	1	3	–	5	–	2
Clemson	2	–	4	–	0	3	–	7	–	0
Virginia	1	–	5	–	0	5	–	5	–	0
$ – Conference champion; Rankings from AP Poll

The 1964 South Carolina Gamecocks football team represented the University of South Carolina as a member of the Atlantic Coast Conference (ACC) during the 1964 NCAA University Division football season. Led by fourth-year head coach Marvin Bass, the Gamecocks compiled an overall record of 3–5–2 with a mark of 2–3–1 in conference play, placing sixth in the ACC. The team played home games at Carolina Stadium in Columbia, South Carolina.

== Schedule ==
Date	Opponent	Site	Result	Attendance	Source
September 19	Duke	Carolina Stadium; Columbia, SC	T 9–9	35,000	
September 26	at Maryland	Byrd Stadium; College Park, MD	L 6–24	23,500	
October 3	Georgia*	Carolina Stadium; Columbia, SC (rivalry)	T 7–7	17,994	
October 10	at No. 8 Nebraska*	Memorial Stadium; Lincoln, NE	L 6–28	47,874	
October 17	at Florida*	Florida Field; Gainesville, FL	L 0–37	43,000	
October 24	at North Carolina	Kenan Memorial Stadium; Chapel Hill, NC (rivalry)	L 6–24	36,000	
October 31	at NC State	Riddick Stadium; Raleigh, NC	L 14–17	21,000	
November 7	The Citadel*	Carolina Stadium; Columbia, SC	W 17–14	19,000	
November 14	Wake Forest	Carolina Stadium; Columbia, SC	W 23–13	21,963	
November 21	at Clemson	Memorial Stadium; Clemson, SC (rivalry)	W 7–3	40,000	
*Non-conference game; Rankings from AP Poll released prior to the game
