= 1964 North Carolina Tar Heels football team =

American college football season

1964 North Carolina Tar Heels football
- Conference: Atlantic Coast Conference
- Record: 5–5 (4–3 ACC)
- Head coach: Jim Hickey (6th season)
- Captains: Chris Hanburger; Ron Tuthill
- Home stadium: Kenan Memorial Stadium

1964 Atlantic Coast Conference football standings
	Conf.					Overall
Team	W		L		T	W		L		T
NC State $	5	–	2	–	0	5	–	5	–	0
Duke	3	–	2	–	1	4	–	5	–	1
Maryland	4	–	3	–	0	5	–	5	–	0
North Carolina	4	–	3	–	0	5	–	5	–	0
Wake Forest	4	–	3	–	0	5	–	5	–	0
South Carolina	2	–	3	–	1	3	–	5	–	2
Clemson	2	–	4	–	0	3	–	7	–	0
Virginia	1	–	5	–	0	5	–	5	–	0
$ – Conference champion; Rankings from AP Poll

The 1964 North Carolina Tar Heels football team represented the University of North Carolina at Chapel Hill during the 1964 NCAA University Division football season. The Tar Heels were led by sixth-year head coach Jim Hickey and played their home games at Kenan Memorial Stadium in Chapel Hill, North Carolina.

== Schedule ==
Date	Time	Opponent	Site	Result	Attendance	Source
September 19	1:30 p.m.	NC State	Kenan Memorial Stadium; Chapel Hill, NC (rivalry)	L 13–14	45,500	
September 26	1:30 p.m.	Michigan State*	Kenan Memorial Stadium; Chapel Hill, NC	W 21–15	40,500	
October 3	1:30 p.m.	Wake Forest	Kenan Memorial Stadium; Chapel Hill, NC (rivalry)	W 23–0	39,468	
October 10	8:00 p.m.	at LSU*	Tiger Stadium; Baton Rouge, LA	L 3–20	68,000	
October 17	2:15 p.m.	vs. Maryland	Foreman Field; Norfolk, VA (Oyster Bowl)	L 9–10	28,000	
October 24	1:30 p.m.	South Carolina	Kenan Memorial Stadium; Chapel Hill, NC (rivalry)	W 24–6	36,000	
October 31	2:00 p.m.	at Georgia*	Sanford Stadium; Athens, GA	L 8–24	40,000	
November 7	2:00 p.m.	at Clemson	Memorial Stadium; Clemson, SC	W 29–0	35,000	
November 14	1:30 p.m.	at Virginia	Scott Stadium; Charlottesville, VA (South's Oldest Rivalry)	L 27–31	21,325	
November 21	1:30 p.m.	Duke	Kenan Memorial Stadium; Chapel Hill, NC (Victory Bell)	W 21–15	45,500	
*Non-conference game; All times are in Eastern time
