= 1964 West Virginia Mountaineers football team =

American college football season

1964 West Virginia Mountaineers football

SoCon champion

Liberty Bowl, L 6–32 vs. Utah
- Conference: Southern Conference
- Record: 7–4 (5–0 SoCon)
- Head coach: Gene Corum (5th season)
- Home stadium: Mountaineer Field

1964 Southern Conference football standings
	Conf.					Overall
Team	W		L		T	W		L		T
West Virginia $	5	–	0	–	0	7	–	4	–	0
Virginia Tech	3	–	1	–	0	6	–	4	–	0
George Washington	3	–	2	–	0	5	–	4	–	0
The Citadel	4	–	3	–	0	4	–	6	–	0
William & Mary	4	–	3	–	0	4	–	6	–	0
Richmond	2	–	4	–	0	3	–	7	–	0
Davidson	1	–	3	–	0	3	–	6	–	0
Furman	1	–	4	–	0	3	–	7	–	0
VMI	1	–	4	–	0	1	–	9	–	0
$ – Conference champion

The 1964 West Virginia Mountaineers football team represented West Virginia University as a member of the Southern Conference (SoCon) during the 1964 NCAA University Division football season. Led by fifth-year head coach Gene Corum, the Mountaineers compiled an overall record of 7–4 with a mark of 5–0 in conference play, winning the SoCon title. West Virginia was invited to the Liberty Bowl, where the Mountaineers lost to Utah, 32–6.

== Schedule ==
Date	Opponent	Site	Result	Attendance	Source
September 19	at Richmond	City Stadium; Richmond, VA	W 20–10	12,000	
September 26	The Citadel	Mountaineer Field; Morgantown, WV	W 7–3	17,000	
October 3	at Rice*	Rice Stadium; Houston, TX	L 0–24	25,000	
October 10	at Pittsburgh*	Pitt Stadium; Pittsburgh, PA (rivalry)	L 0–14	37,179	
October 17	at Virginia Tech	Miles Stadium; Blacksburg, VA (rivalry)	W 23–10	13,500	
October 24	Penn State*	Mountaineer Field; Morgantown, WV (rivalry)	L 8–37	26,000	
October 31	Kentucky*	Mountaineer Field; Morgantown, WV	W 26–21	20,000	
November 7	at George Washington	District of Columbia Stadium; Washington, DC	W 20–19	14,200	
November 14	William & Mary	Mountaineer Field; Morgantown, WV	W 24–14	15,000	
November 21	No. 9 Syracuse*	Mountaineer Field; Morgantown, WV (rivalry)	W 28–27	14,000	
December 19	vs. Utah*	Atlantic City Convention Hall; Atlantic City, NJ (Liberty Bowl)	L 6–32	6,059	
*Non-conference game; Rankings from AP Poll released prior to the game
