= 1964 VMI Keydets football team =

American college football season

1964 VMI Keydets football
- Conference: Southern Conference
- Record: 1–9 (1–4 SoCon)
- Head coach: John McKenna (12th season)
- Home stadium: Alumni Memorial Field

1964 Southern Conference football standings
| | Conf. | | | | | Overall |
| Team | W | | L | | T | W | | L | | T |
|---|---|---|---|---|---|---|---|---|---|---|
| West Virginia $ | 5 | – | 0 | – | 0 | 7 | – | 4 | – | 0 |
| Virginia Tech | 3 | – | 1 | – | 0 | 6 | – | 4 | – | 0 |
| George Washington | 3 | – | 2 | – | 0 | 5 | – | 4 | – | 0 |
| The Citadel | 4 | – | 3 | – | 0 | 4 | – | 6 | – | 0 |
| William & Mary | 4 | – | 3 | – | 0 | 4 | – | 6 | – | 0 |
| Richmond | 2 | – | 4 | – | 0 | 3 | – | 7 | – | 0 |
| Davidson | 1 | – | 3 | – | 0 | 3 | – | 6 | – | 0 |
| Furman | 1 | – | 4 | – | 0 | 3 | – | 7 | – | 0 |
| VMI | 1 | – | 4 | – | 0 | 1 | – | 9 | – | 0 |
$ – Conference champion

The 1964 VMI Keydets football team was an American football team that represented the Virginia Military Institute (VMI) as a member of the Southern Conference (SoCon) during the 1964 NCAA University Division football season. In their 12th year under head coach John McKenna, the team compiled an overall record of 1–9 with a mark of 1–4 in conference play, tying for eighth place in the SoCon.

== Schedule ==
| Date | Opponent | Site | Result | Attendance | Source |
|---|---|---|---|---|---|
| September 19 | William & Mary | Alumni Memorial Field; Lexington, VA (rivalry) | L 12–14 | 3,500 | |
| September 25 | at Richmond | City Stadium; Richmond, VA (rivalry) | L 14–20 | | |
| October 3 | at Villanova* | Villanova Stadium; Villanova, PA | L 7–27 | 12,000 | |
| October 10 | vs. Virginia* | City Stadium; Richmond, VA (Tobacco Bowl) | L 19–20 | 17,500 | |
| October 17 | at Buffalo* | War Memorial Stadium; Buffalo, NY | L 10–14 | 21,000 | |
| October 24 | Davidson | Alumni Memorial Field; Lexington, VA | W 35–0 | 5,500 | |
| October 31 | at Tulane* | Tulane Stadium; New Orleans, LA | L 6–25 | 18,000 | |
| November 6 | at Detroit* | University of Detroit Stadium; Detroit, MI | L 7–28 | 8,373 | |
| November 14 | at The Citadel | Johnson Hagood Stadium; Charleston, SC (rivalry) | L 0–17 | 12,000 | |
| November 26 | vs. Virginia Tech | Victory Stadium; Roanoke, VA (rivalry) | L 13–35 | 25,000 | |
*Non-conference game
