= 1964 Duke Blue Devils football team =

American college football season

1964 Duke Blue Devils football
- Conference: Atlantic Coast Conference
- Record: 4–5–1 (3–2–1 ACC)
- Head coach: William D. Murray (14th season)
- MVP: Mike Curtis
- Captain: Dan Lonon
- Home stadium: Duke Stadium

1964 Atlantic Coast Conference football standings
| | Conf. | | | | | Overall |
| Team | W | | L | | T | W | | L | | T |
|---|---|---|---|---|---|---|---|---|---|---|
| NC State $ | 5 | – | 2 | – | 0 | 5 | – | 5 | – | 0 |
| Duke | 3 | – | 2 | – | 1 | 4 | – | 5 | – | 1 |
| Maryland | 4 | – | 3 | – | 0 | 5 | – | 5 | – | 0 |
| North Carolina | 4 | – | 3 | – | 0 | 5 | – | 5 | – | 0 |
| Wake Forest | 4 | – | 3 | – | 0 | 5 | – | 5 | – | 0 |
| South Carolina | 2 | – | 3 | – | 1 | 3 | – | 5 | – | 2 |
| Clemson | 2 | – | 4 | – | 0 | 3 | – | 7 | – | 0 |
| Virginia | 1 | – | 5 | – | 0 | 5 | – | 5 | – | 0 |
$ – Conference champion; Rankings from AP Poll

The 1964 Duke Blue Devils football team was an American football team that represented Duke University as a member of the Atlantic Coast Conference (ACC) during the 1964 NCAA University Division football season. In their 14th year under head coach William D. Murray, the Blue Devils compiled an overall record of 4–5–1, with a conference record of 3–2–1, and finished second in the ACC.

== Schedule ==
| Date | Opponent | Site | Result | Attendance | Source |
|---|---|---|---|---|---|
| September 19 | at South Carolina | Carolina Stadium; Columbia, SC | T 9–9 | 35,000 | |
| September 26 | Virginia | Duke Stadium; Durham, NC | W 30–0 | 20,000 | |
| October 10 | Maryland | Duke Stadium; Durham, NC | W 24–17 | 27,000 | |
| October 17 | NC State | Duke Stadium; Durham, NC (rivalry) | W 35–3 | 34,000 | |
| October 24 | at Army* | Michie Stadium; West Point, NY | W 6–0 | 31,843 | |
| October 31 | No. 8 Georgia Tech*^{†} | Duke Stadium; Durham, NC | L 8–21 | 45,000 | |
| November 7 | at Wake Forest | Bowman Gray Stadium; Winston-Salem, NC (rivalry) | L 7–20 | 17,000 | |
| November 14 | at Navy* | Navy–Marine Corps Memorial Stadium; Annapolis, MD | L 14–27 | 28,014 | |
| November 21 | at North Carolina | Kenan Stadium; Chapel Hill, NC (Victory Bell) | L 15–21 | 45,000 | |
| November 28 | at Tulane* | Tulane Stadium; New Orleans, LA | L 0–17 | 12,000 | |
*Non-conference game; ^{†}Homecoming; Rankings from AP Poll released prior to the game
