= 1964 Furman Paladins football team =

American college football season

1964 Furman Paladins football
- Conference: Southern Conference
- Record: 3–7 (1–4 SoCon)
- Head coach: Bob King (7th season)
- Captain: Ernest Zuberer
- Home stadium: Sirrine Stadium

1964 Southern Conference football standings
| | Conf. | | | | | Overall |
| Team | W | | L | | T | W | | L | | T |
|---|---|---|---|---|---|---|---|---|---|---|
| West Virginia $ | 5 | – | 0 | – | 0 | 7 | – | 4 | – | 0 |
| Virginia Tech | 3 | – | 1 | – | 0 | 6 | – | 4 | – | 0 |
| George Washington | 3 | – | 2 | – | 0 | 5 | – | 4 | – | 0 |
| The Citadel | 4 | – | 3 | – | 0 | 4 | – | 6 | – | 0 |
| William & Mary | 4 | – | 3 | – | 0 | 4 | – | 6 | – | 0 |
| Richmond | 2 | – | 4 | – | 0 | 3 | – | 7 | – | 0 |
| Davidson | 1 | – | 3 | – | 0 | 3 | – | 6 | – | 0 |
| Furman | 1 | – | 4 | – | 0 | 3 | – | 7 | – | 0 |
| VMI | 1 | – | 4 | – | 0 | 1 | – | 9 | – | 0 |
$ – Conference champion

The 1964 Furman Paladins football team was an American football team that represented Furman University as a member of the Southern Conference (SoCon) during the 1964 NCAA University Division football season. In their seventh season under head coach Bob King, Furman compiled a 3–7 record, with a mark of 1–4 in conference play, placing eighth in the SoCon.

== Schedule ==
| Date | Opponent | Site | Result | Attendance | Source |
|---|---|---|---|---|---|
| September 12 | Mississippi College* | Sirrine Stadium; Greenville, SC | W 13–10 | 5,500 | |
| September 19 | at Clemson* | Memorial Stadium; Clemson, SC | L 0–28 | 20,000 | |
| September 26 | Wofford* | Sirrine Stadium; Greenville, SC (rivalry) | L 14–21 | 10,000 | |
| October 2 | at George Washington | District of Columbia Stadium; Washington, DC | L 14–34 | 6,000 | |
| October 10 | at William & Mary | Cary Field; Williamsburg, VA | L 14–21 | 8,000 | |
| October 17 | Presbyterian* | Sirrine Stadium; Greenville, SC | W 28–6 | 7,000 | |
| October 24 | The Citadel | Sirrine Stadium; Greenville, SC (rivalry) | L 0–17 | 7,500 | |
| October 31 | at Davidson | Richardson Stadium; Davidson, NC | L 0–23 | 5,000 | |
| November 7 | East Carolina* | Sirrine Stadium; Greenville, SC | L 14–34 | 5,000 | |
| November 14 | at Richmond | City Stadium; Richmond, VA | W 19–18 | 5,000 | |
*Non-conference game
