= 1964 Clemson Tigers football team =

American college football season

1964 Clemson Tigers football
- Conference: Atlantic Coast Conference
- Record: 3–7 (2–4 ACC)
- Head coach: Frank Howard (25th season)
- Captains: John Boyett; Ted Bunton
- Home stadium: Memorial Stadium

1964 Atlantic Coast Conference football standings
	Conf.					Overall
Team	W		L		T	W		L		T
NC State $	5	–	2	–	0	5	–	5	–	0
Duke	3	–	2	–	1	4	–	5	–	1
Maryland	4	–	3	–	0	5	–	5	–	0
North Carolina	4	–	3	–	0	5	–	5	–	0
Wake Forest	4	–	3	–	0	5	–	5	–	0
South Carolina	2	–	3	–	1	3	–	5	–	2
Clemson	2	–	4	–	0	3	–	7	–	0
Virginia	1	–	5	–	0	5	–	5	–	0
$ – Conference champion; Rankings from AP Poll

The 1964 Clemson Tigers football team was an American football team that represented Clemson University in the Atlantic Coast Conference (ACC) during the 1964 NCAA University Division football season. In its 25th season under head coach Frank Howard, the team compiled a 3–7 record (2–4 against conference opponents), finished seventh in the ACC, and was outscored by a total of 135 to 105. The team played its home games at Memorial Stadium in Clemson, South Carolina.

John Boyett and Ted Bunton were the team captains. The team's statistical leaders included Thomas Ray with 253 passing yards, Hal Davis with 533 rushing yards and 30 points scored (5 touchdowns), and Hoss Hostetler with 103 receiving yards.

== Schedule ==
Date	Time	Opponent	Site	Result	Attendance	Source
September 19	2:00 p.m.	Furman*	Memorial Stadium; Clemson, SC	W 28–0	20,000	
September 26	1:30 p.m.	at NC State	Riddick Stadium; Raleigh, NC (rivalry)	L 0–9	17,500	
October 3	2:00 p.m.	at Georgia Tech*	Grant Field; Atlanta, GA (rivalry)	L 7–14	46,571	
October 10	2:00 p.m.	at Georgia*	Sanford Stadium; Athens, GA (rivalry)	L 7–19	31,000	
October 17	2:00 p.m.	at Wake Forest	Bowman Gray Stadium; Winston-Salem, NC	W 21–2	13,000	
October 24	3:00 p.m.	at TCU*	Amon G. Carter Stadium; Fort Worth, TX	L 10–14	14,154	
October 31	2:00 p.m.	Virginia	Memorial Stadium; Clemson, SC	W 29–7	17,000	
November 7	2:00 p.m.	North Carolina^{†}	Memorial Stadium; Clemson, SC	L 0–29	35,000	
November 14	1:30 p.m.	at Maryland	Byrd Stadium; College Park, MD	L 0–34	26,500	
November 21	2:00 p.m.	South Carolina	Memorial Stadium; Clemson, SC (rivalry)	L 3–7	40,000	
*Non-conference game; ^{†}Homecoming; All times are in Eastern time
