= Marvin Bass =

American football head coach (1919–2010)

- Bass as a player for William & Mary (c. 1942)

Biographical details
- Born: August 28, 1919; Norfolk, Virginia, U.S.
- Died: December 3, 2010 (aged 91); Blythewood, South Carolina, U.S.

Playing career

Football
- 1940–1942: William & Mary

Coaching career (HC unless noted)

Football
- 1944–1947: William & Mary (assistant)
- 1948: North Carolina (assistant)
- 1949–1950: William & Mary (assistant)
- 1951: William & Mary
- 1952: Washington Redskins (assistant)
- 1953–1954: North Carolina (assistant)
- 1955–1959: South Carolina (line)
- 1960: Georgia Tech (DC)
- 1961–1965: South Carolina
- 1966–1967: Montreal Beavers
- 1969–1972: Buffalo Bills (assistant)
- 1973: Richmond (assistant)
- 1974: Birmingham Americans (assistant)
- 1975: Birmingham Vulcans
- 1977–1978: Buffalo Bills (assistant)
- 1979–1981: Calgary Stampeders (assistant)
- 1982–1992: Denver Broncos (assistant)

Baseball
- 1948: William & Mary

Administrative career (AD unless noted)
- 1961–1965: South Carolina
- 1968: San Francisco 49ers (scout)

Head coaching record
- Overall: 24–32–4 (college football); 9–3 (WFL)

Accomplishments and honors

Awards
- First-team All-SoCon (1942); Second-team All-SoCon (1941)

Marvin Crosby "Moose" Bass (August 28, 1919 – December 3, 2010) was an American football player, coach, and scout. He served as the head coach of the College of William & Mary's football team in 1951. He also coached the South Carolina Gamecocks football team for five seasons, from 1961 to 1965.

Bass, a native of Petersburg, Virginia, was a member of the winningest football team in William & Mary history. Bass captained the 1942 Indians, which compiled a 9–1–1 record. He later was an assistant coach at his alma mater when the 1947 Indians were 9–1.

In 1974, Bass was an assistant football coach for the Birmingham Americans of the World Football League (WFL), a league formed in the early 1970s to rival the National Football League (NFL). He became head coach of the WFL's Birmingham Vulcans the following year. The league lured such NFL name players as Larry Csonka, Paul Warfield and Jim Kiick It lasted 18 months, losing US$30 million.

In his 37-year coaching career, Bass coached in more football leagues than most coaches of his time. This included stints as head coach for teams in the Southern Conference, Atlantic Coast Conference, Continental League, and the Canadian League. Bass was also assistant coach with the Calgary Stampeders of the Canadian League.

While at William & Mary, Bass was All-State and All-Southern Conference while helping the Indians to defeat the Oklahoma Sooners 14–7 in the final 1942 game. He served as head football coach at William & Mary as well as South Carolina and helped bring American football to Canada when he coached the Montreal Beavers in the Continental Football League (COFL).

Under Dan Reeves, who he recruited and coached at South Carolina, Bass served as an assistant coach for the Denver Broncos (3 Super Bowls) – 1982-93. When Reeves returned to the NFL as head coach for the Atlanta Falcons he got Bass to join his staff. In 2004, Bass ended his 60-year coaching career in 1999 at the Super Bowl when he was 85.

Bass was inducted into the Virginia Sports Hall of Fame in 1981.

== Head coaching record ==
=== College football ===
Year	Team	Overall	Conference	Standing	Bowl/playoffs
William & Mary Indians (Southern Conference) (1951)
1951	William & Mary	7–3	5–1	T–3rd	
William & Mary:		7–3	5–1		
South Carolina Gamecocks (Atlantic Coast Conference) (1961–1965)
1961	South Carolina	4–6	3–4	T–5th	
1962	South Carolina	4–5–1	3–4	T–4th	
1963	South Carolina	1–8–1	1–5–1	6th	
1964	South Carolina	3–5–2	2–3–1	6th	
1965	South Carolina	5–5	4–2		
South Carolina:		17–29–4			
Total:		24–32–4			
