= Bill Elias =

American football player and coach (1923–1998)

Biographical details
- Born: March 15, 1923; Martins Ferry, Ohio, U.S.
- Died: June 28, 1998 (aged 75); Claremont, California, U.S.

Playing career
- 1945–1946: Maryland
- Position: Guard

Coaching career (HC unless noted)
- 1950–1952: Richmond HS (IN)
- 1953–1955: Purdue (assistant)
- 1956–1959: Purdue (backfield)
- 1960: George Washington
- 1961–1964: Virginia
- 1965–1968: Navy
- 1969: Boston Patriots (DB)

Head coaching record
- Overall: 36–48–5 (college)

Accomplishments and honors

Championships
- 2 North Central Conference (HS) (1951, 1952)

Awards
- ACC Coach of the Year (1961)

William T. Elias (March 15, 1923 – June 28, 1998) was an American football coach. He served as the head coach at George Washington University, the University of Virginia, and the United States Naval Academy. Elias compiled a career college football record of 36–48–5.

== Biography ==
Elias attended Martins Ferry High School in Martins Ferry, Ohio, where he starred on the football and basketball teams. He went on to college at the University of Maryland. He was a guard on the football team in 1945 and 1946, but did not earn a varsity letter.

Elias began his coaching career at Richmond High School in Richmond, Indiana from 1950 to 1952. In his last two seasons there, he led two undefeated teams to consecutive North Central Conference championships and set the longest Indiana interscholastic winning streak at 22 games. In 1956, Elias was promoted from an assistant position to head backfield coach at Purdue. In 1960, he received his first collegiate head coaching position at George Washington, where he compiled a 5–3–1 record. From 1961 to 1964, he coached at Virginia, where he compiled a 16–23–1 record. From 1965 to 1968, he coached at Navy, where he compiled a 15–22–3 record.

In 1969 Elias was hired as an assistant coach for the Boston Patriots of the American Football League (AFL).

== Head coaching record ==
=== College ===
Year	Team	Overall	Conference	Standing	Bowl/playoffs
George Washington Colonials (Southern Conference) (1960)
1960	George Washington	5–3–1	4–2	T–2nd	
George Washington:		5–3–1	4–2		
Virginia Cavaliers (Atlantic Coast Conference) (1961–1964)
1961	Virginia	4–6	2–4	8th	
1962	Virginia	5–5	1–4	7th	
1963	Virginia	2–7–1	0–5–1	8th	
1964	Virginia	5–5	1–5	8th	
Virginia:		16–23–1	4–18–1		
Navy Midshipmen (NCAA University Division independent) (1965–1968)
1965	Navy	4–4–2			
1966	Navy	4–6			
1967	Navy	5–4–1			
1968	Navy	2–8			
Navy:		15–22–3			
Total:		36–48–5			
