= 1964 The Citadel Bulldogs football team =

American college football season

1964 The Citadel Bulldogs football
- Conference: Southern Conference
- Record: 4–6 (4–3 SoCon)
- Head coach: Eddie Teague (8th season)
- Home stadium: Johnson Hagood Stadium

1964 Southern Conference football standings
	Conf.					Overall
Team	W		L		T	W		L		T
West Virginia $	5	–	0	–	0	7	–	4	–	0
Virginia Tech	3	–	1	–	0	6	–	4	–	0
George Washington	3	–	2	–	0	5	–	4	–	0
The Citadel	4	–	3	–	0	4	–	6	–	0
William & Mary	4	–	3	–	0	4	–	6	–	0
Richmond	2	–	4	–	0	3	–	7	–	0
Davidson	1	–	3	–	0	3	–	6	–	0
Furman	1	–	4	–	0	3	–	7	–	0
VMI	1	–	4	–	0	1	–	9	–	0
$ – Conference champion

The 1964 The Citadel Bulldogs football team represented The Citadel, The Military College of South Carolina in the 1964 NCAA University Division football season. Eddie Teague served as head coach for the eighth season. The Bulldogs played as members of the Southern Conference and played home games at Johnson Hagood Stadium.

== Schedule ==
Date	Opponent	Site	Result	Attendance	Source
September 19	at Army*	Mitchie Stadium; West Point, NY	L 0–34	17,498–17,500	
September 26	at West Virginia	Mountaineer Field; Morgantown, WV	L 3–7	17,000	
October 3	Davidson	Johnson Hagood Stadium; Charleston, SC	W 28–0	10,400	
October 10	Richmond	Johnson Hagood Stadium; Charleston, SC	W 33–0		
October 17	at William & Mary	Cary Field; Williamsburg, VA	L 0–10	8,200	
October 24	at Furman	Sirrine Stadium; Greenville, SC (rivalry)	W 17–0	7,500	
October 31	East Carolina*	Johnson Hagood Stadium; Charleston, SC	L 10–19	11,400	
November 7	at South Carolina*	Carolina Stadium; Columbia, SC	L 14–17	19,000	
November 14	VMI^{†}	Johnson Hagood Stadium; Charleston, SC (rivalry)	W 17–0	12,000	
November 21	George Washington	Johnson Hagood Stadium; Charleston, SC	L 6–35	3,600	
*Non-conference game; ^{†}Homecoming

== AFL Draft selection ==
Year	Round	Pick	Overall	Name	Team	Position
1964	8	7	63	Vince Petno	Oakland Raiders	Defensive back
