= 1964 Virginia Cavaliers football team =

American college football season

1964 Virginia Cavaliers football
- Conference: Atlantic Coast Conference
- Record: 5–5 (1–5 ACC)
- Head coach: Bill Elias (4th season)
- Captains: Bob Kowalkowski; Ted Torok
- Home stadium: Scott Stadium

1964 Atlantic Coast Conference football standings
	Conf.					Overall
Team	W		L		T	W		L		T
NC State $	5	–	2	–	0	5	–	5	–	0
Duke	3	–	2	–	1	4	–	5	–	1
Maryland	4	–	3	–	0	5	–	5	–	0
North Carolina	4	–	3	–	0	5	–	5	–	0
Wake Forest	4	–	3	–	0	5	–	5	–	0
South Carolina	2	–	3	–	1	3	–	5	–	2
Clemson	2	–	4	–	0	3	–	7	–	0
Virginia	1	–	5	–	0	5	–	5	–	0
$ – Conference champion; Rankings from AP Poll

The 1964 Virginia Cavaliers football team represented the University of Virginia during the 1964 NCAA University Division football season. The Cavaliers were led by fourth-year head coach Bill Elias and played their home games at Scott Stadium in Charlottesville, Virginia. They competed as members of the Atlantic Coast Conference, finishing in last. Elias left at the conclusion of the season to accept a one-year head coaching contract at the United States Naval Academy. He had an overall record of 16–23–1 at Virginia and failed to produce a winning season.

== Schedule ==
Date	Opponent	Site	Result	Attendance	Source
September 19	Wake Forest	Scott Stadium; Charlottesville, VA	L 21–31	14,000	
September 26	at Duke	Duke Stadium; Durham, NC	L 0–30	20,000	
October 3	Virginia Tech	Scott Stadium; Charlottesville, VA (rivalry)	W 20–17	23,500	
October 10	vs. VMI*	City Stadium; Richmond, VA (Tobacco Bowl)	W 20–19	17,500	
October 17	Army*	Scott Stadium; Charlottesville, VA	W 35–14	26,500–27,500	
October 24	NC State^{†}	Scott Stadium; Charlottesville, VA	L 15–24	20,100	
October 31	at Clemson	Memorial Stadium; Clemson, SC	L 7–29	17,000	
November 7	at William & Mary*	Cary Field; Williamsburg, VA	W 14–13	12,000	
November 14	North Carolina	Scott Stadium; Charlottesville, VA (South's Oldest Rivalry)	W 31–27	21,325	
November 21	Maryland	Scott Stadium; Charlottesville, VA (rivalry)	L 0–10	17,000	
*Non-conference game; ^{†}Homecoming
