= 1964 Davidson Wildcats football team =

American college football season

1964 Davidson Wildcats football
- Conference: Southern Conference
- Record: 3–6 (1–3 SoCon)
- Head coach: Bill Dole (13th season)
- Home stadium: Richardson Stadium

1964 Southern Conference football standings
	Conf.					Overall
Team	W		L		T	W		L		T
West Virginia $	5	–	0	–	0	7	–	4	–	0
Virginia Tech	3	–	1	–	0	6	–	4	–	0
George Washington	3	–	2	–	0	5	–	4	–	0
The Citadel	4	–	3	–	0	4	–	6	–	0
William & Mary	4	–	3	–	0	4	–	6	–	0
Richmond	2	–	4	–	0	3	–	7	–	0
Davidson	1	–	3	–	0	3	–	6	–	0
Furman	1	–	4	–	0	3	–	7	–	0
VMI	1	–	4	–	0	1	–	9	–	0
$ – Conference champion

The 1964 Davidson Wildcats football team represented Davidson College as a member of the Southern Conference (SoCon) during the 1964 NCAA University Division football season. Led by 13th-year head coach Bill Dole, the Wildcats compiled an overall record of 3–6 with a mark of 1–3 in conference play, placing seventh in the SoCon.

== Schedule ==
Date	Opponent	Site	Result	Attendance	Source
September 26	Mississippi College*	Richardson Stadium; Davidson, NC	W 17–14	6,500	
October 3	at The Citadel	Johnson Hagood Stadium; Chesleston, SC	L 0–28	10,400	
October 10	at Presbyterian*	Bailey Stadium; Clinton, SC	L 0–13	4,500	
October 17	Richmond	Richardson Stadium; Davidson, NC	L 7–20		
October 24	at VMI	Alumni Memorial Field; Lexington, VA	L 0–35	5,500	
October 31	Furman	Richardson Stadium; Davidson, NC	W 23–0	5,000	
November 7	at Lehigh*	Taylor Stadium; Bethlehem, PA	L 10–13	8,000	
November 14	Lafayette*	Richardson Stadium; Davidson, NC	W 31–12	5,800	
November 21	at Wofford*	Snyder Field; Spartanburg, SC	L 3–17		
*Non-conference game
