= 1964 William & Mary Indians football team =

American college football season

1964 William & Mary Indians football
- Conference: Southern Conference
- Record: 4–6 (4–3 SoCon)
- Head coach: Marv Levy (1st season)
- Captain: Scott Swan
- Home stadium: Cary Field

1964 Southern Conference football standings
	Conf.					Overall
Team	W		L		T	W		L		T
West Virginia $	5	–	0	–	0	7	–	4	–	0
Virginia Tech	3	–	1	–	0	6	–	4	–	0
George Washington	3	–	2	–	0	5	–	4	–	0
The Citadel	4	–	3	–	0	4	–	6	–	0
William & Mary	4	–	3	–	0	4	–	6	–	0
Richmond	2	–	4	–	0	3	–	7	–	0
Davidson	1	–	3	–	0	3	–	6	–	0
Furman	1	–	4	–	0	3	–	7	–	0
VMI	1	–	4	–	0	1	–	9	–	0
$ – Conference champion

The 1964 William & Mary Indians football team was an American football team that represented the College of William & Mary as a member of the Southern Conference (SoCon) during the 1964 NCAA University Division football season. In their first season under head coach Marv Levy, the Indians compiled a 4–6 record with a mark of 4–3 in conference play, tying for fourth place in the SoCon.

== Schedule ==
Date	Opponent	Site	Result	Attendance	Source
September 19	at VMI	Alumni Memorial Field; Lexington, VA (rivalry)	W 14–12	3,500	
September 26	at Navy*	Navy–Marine Corps Memorial Stadium; Annapolis, MD	L 6–35	21,133	
October 3	at Pittsburgh*	Pitt Stadium; Pittsburgh, PA	L 7–34	23,264	
October 10	Furman	Cary Field; Williamsburg, VA	W 21–14	8,000	
October 17	The Citadel	Cary Field; Williamsburg, VA	W 10–0	8,200	
October 23	at George Washington	District of Columbia Stadium; Washington, DC	L 0–21	6,000	
October 31	Virginia Tech	Cary Field; Williamsburg, VA	L 20–27	11,000	
November 7	Virginia*	Cary Field; Williamsburg, VA	L 13–14	12,000	
November 14	at West Virginia	Mountaineer Field; Morgantown, WV	L 14–24	15,000	
November 26	at Richmond	City Stadium; Richmond, VA (rivalry)	W 33–13	10,500	
*Non-conference game
