= 1964 George Washington Colonials football team =

American college football season

1964 George Washington Colonials football
- Conference: Southern Conference
- Record: 5–4 (3–2 SoCon)
- Head coach: Jim Camp (4th season)
- Home stadium: District of Columbia Stadium

1964 Southern Conference football standings
	Conf.					Overall
Team	W		L		T	W		L		T
West Virginia $	5	–	0	–	0	7	–	4	–	0
Virginia Tech	3	–	1	–	0	6	–	4	–	0
George Washington	3	–	2	–	0	5	–	4	–	0
The Citadel	4	–	3	–	0	4	–	6	–	0
William & Mary	4	–	3	–	0	4	–	6	–	0
Richmond	2	–	4	–	0	3	–	7	–	0
Davidson	1	–	3	–	0	3	–	6	–	0
Furman	1	–	4	–	0	3	–	7	–	0
VMI	1	–	4	–	0	1	–	9	–	0
$ – Conference champion

The 1964 George Washington Colonials football team was an American football team that represented George Washington University as part of the Southern Conference during the 1964 NCAA University Division football season. In its fourth season under head coach Jim Camp, the team compiled a 5–4 record (3–2 in the SoCon).

== Schedule ==
Date	Opponent	Site	Result	Attendance	Source
September 26	at Boston University*	Nickerson Field; Boston, MA	L 7–15	4,500	
October 2	Furman	District of Columbia Stadium; Washington, DC	W 34–14	6,000	
October 10	at Virginia Tech	Miles Stadium; Blacksburg, VA	L 0–33	11,000	
October 17	Vanderbilt*	District of Columbia Stadium; Washington, DC	L 0–14	5,200	
October 23	William & Mary	District of Columbia Stadium; Washington, DC	W 21–0	6,000	
October 31	at Cincinnati*	Nippert Stadium; Cincinnati, OH	W 17–15	20,000	
November 7	West Virginia	District of Columbia Stadium; Washington, DC	L 19–20	14,200	
November 14	Villanova*	District of Columbia Stadium; Washington, DC	W 13–6	9,100	
November 21	at The Citadel	Johnson Hagood Stadium; Charleston, SC	W 35–6	3,600	
*Non-conference game
