= 1964 Maryland Terrapins football team =

American college football season

1964 Maryland Terrapins football
- Conference: Atlantic Coast Conference
- Record: 5–5 (4–3 ACC)
- Head coach: Tom Nugent (6th season)
- Home stadium: Byrd Stadium

1964 Atlantic Coast Conference football standings
	Conf.					Overall
Team	W		L		T	W		L		T
NC State $	5	–	2	–	0	5	–	5	–	0
Duke	3	–	2	–	1	4	–	5	–	1
Maryland	4	–	3	–	0	5	–	5	–	0
North Carolina	4	–	3	–	0	5	–	5	–	0
Wake Forest	4	–	3	–	0	5	–	5	–	0
South Carolina	2	–	3	–	1	3	–	5	–	2
Clemson	2	–	4	–	0	3	–	7	–	0
Virginia	1	–	5	–	0	5	–	5	–	0
$ – Conference champion; Rankings from AP Poll

The 1964 Maryland Terrapins football team represented the University of Maryland in the 1964 NCAA University Division football season. In their sixth season under head coach Tom Nugent, the Terrapins compiled a 5–5 record (4–3 in conference), finished in a tie for third place in the Atlantic Coast Conference, and outscored their opponents 164 to 126. The team's statistical leaders included Phil Petry with 809 passing yards, Tom Hickey with 894 rushing yards, and Dick Absher with 268 receiving yards.

== Schedule ==
Date	Opponent	Site	Result	Attendance	Source
September 19	No. 2 Oklahoma*	Byrd Stadium; College Park, MD	L 3–13	35,200	
September 26	South Carolina	Byrd Stadium; College Park, MD	W 24–6	23,500	
October 3	at NC State	Riddick Stadium; Raleigh, NC	L 13–14	14,500	
October 10	at Duke	Duke Stadium; Durham, NC	L 17–24	27,000	
October 17	vs. North Carolina	Foreman Field; Norfolk, VA (Oyster Bowl)	W 10–9	28,000	
October 24	Wake Forest	Byrd Stadium; College Park, MD	L 17–21	22,000	
October 31	at Penn State*	Beaver Stadium; University Park, PA (rivalry)	L 9–17	33,500	
November 7	Navy*	Byrd Stadium; College Park, MD (rivalry)	W 27–22	40,000	
November 14	Clemson	Byrd Stadium; College Park, MD	W 34–0	26,500	
November 21	at Virginia	Scott Stadium; Charlottesville, VA (rivalry)	W 10–0	17,000	
*Non-conference game; Rankings from AP Poll released prior to the game
