= 1964 Wake Forest Demon Deacons football team =

American college football season

1964 Wake Forest Demon Deacons football
- Conference: Atlantic Coast Conference
- Record: 5–5 (4–3 ACC)
- Head coach: Bill Tate (1st season)
- Captain: Game captains
- Home stadium: Bowman Gray Stadium

1964 Atlantic Coast Conference football standings
	Conf.					Overall
Team	W		L		T	W		L		T
NC State $	5	–	2	–	0	5	–	5	–	0
Duke	3	–	2	–	1	4	–	5	–	1
Maryland	4	–	3	–	0	5	–	5	–	0
North Carolina	4	–	3	–	0	5	–	5	–	0
Wake Forest	4	–	3	–	0	5	–	5	–	0
South Carolina	2	–	3	–	1	3	–	5	–	2
Clemson	2	–	4	–	0	3	–	7	–	0
Virginia	1	–	5	–	0	5	–	5	–	0
$ – Conference champion; Rankings from AP Poll

The 1964 Wake Forest Demon Deacons football team represented Wake Forest University during the 1964 NCAA University Division football season. In its first season under head coach Bill Tate, the team compiled a 5–5 record and finished in a three-way tie for third place in the Atlantic Coast Conference (ACC).

Three players received first-team All-ACC honors from the Associated Press: fullback Brian Piccolo, quarterback John Mackovic, and end Richard Cameron. Piccolo was a unanimous selection for the all-conference team, and was also selected as a first-team All-American by Football News. He set three ACC records in 1964 with 1,044 rushing yards, 111 points scored, and 17 touchdowns. Piccolo also led the nation in 1964 in rushing yards, rushing touchdowns, and points scored. He was named the Atlantic Coast Conference (ACC) Player of the Year, yet went unselected in both the AFL and NFL drafts. Mackovic led the Demon Deacons with 1,340 passing yards while completing 89 of 195 passes. Cameron caught 29 passes for 410 yards.

== Schedule ==
Date	Opponent	Site	Result	Attendance	Source
September 19	at Virginia	Scott Stadium; Charlottesville, VA	W 31–21	14,000	
September 26	vs. VPI*	Victory Stadium; Roanoke, VA (Harvest Bowl)	W 38–21	21,000	
October 3	at North Carolina	Kenan Memorial Stadium; Chapel Hill, NC (rivalry)	L 0–23	39,468	
October 10	at Vanderbilt*	Dudley Field; Nashville, TN	L 6–9	12,600	
October 17	Clemson	Bowman Gray Stadium; Winston-Salem, NC	L 2–21	13,000	
October 24	at Maryland	Byrd Stadium; College Park, MD	W 21–17	22,000	
October 31	at Memphis State*	Crump Stadium; Memphis, TN	L 14–23	14,187	
November 7	Duke	Bowman Gray Stadium; Winston-Salem, NC (rivalry)	W 20–7	17,000	
November 14	at South Carolina	Carolina Stadium; Columbia, SC	L 13–23	21,963	
November 20	NC State	Bowman Gray Stadium; Winston-Salem, NC (rivalry)	W 27–13	17,300	
*Non-conference game

== Team leaders ==
Category	Team Leader	Att/Cth	Yds
Passing	John Mackovic	89/195	1,340
Rushing	Brian Piccolo	252	1,044
Receiving	Richard Cameron	29	410
