= Ron Gassert =

American football player (1940–2022)

No. 73, 71
- Position: Defensive tackle

Personal information
- Born: July 22, 1940; Campbelltown, Pennsylvania, U.S.
- Died: October 8, 2022 (aged 82); Southampton, New Jersey, U.S.
- Listed height: 6 ft 3 in (1.91 m)
- Listed weight: 260 lb (118 kg)

Career information
- High school: Bordentown Military Institute (Bordentown, New Jersey)
- College: Virginia (1958-1961)
- NFL draft: 1962: 4th round, 56th overall pick
- AFL draft: 1962: 13th round, 99th overall pick

Career history
- Green Bay Packers (1962); Philadelphia Bulldogs (1966); Wilmington Clippers (1967); Pottstown Firebirds (1968-1969)

Awards and highlights
- NFL champion (1962); 2× Second-team All-ACC (1960, 1961)
- Stats at Pro Football Reference

Ronald Earl Gassert (July 22, 1940 – October 8, 2022) was an American football defensive tackle in the National Football League (NFL) for the Green Bay Packers.

== Biography ==
Gassert graduated in 1957 from Rancocas Valley Regional High School in Mount Holly, New Jersey. He played college football at the University of Virginia, where he was a defensive end.

Gassert was drafted by the Packers in the fourth round (56th overall) of the 1962 NFL draft. He was also drafted by the Buffalo Bills in the 13th round (99th overall) of the 1962 American Football League draft.

Ron was a member of the 1962 NFL Championship Green Bay Packers. In 1966, Gassert finished his career with the Philadelphia Bulldogs of the Continental Football League, helping to lead the team to the 1966 CFL Championship.

Gassert penned a fictional western novel titled Driven.

After working for thirty years as a banker, Gassert and his wife began a business building furniture that they sold at craft shows. A resident of Medford, New Jersey, Gassert served on the board of education of the Lenape Regional High School District.

== Death ==
Gassert died on October 8, 2022, at the age of eighty-two.
