= Bill Kirchiro =

American football player (born 1940)

No. 64
- Position: Guard

Personal information
- Born: June 29, 1940 (age 86); Bernardsville, New Jersey, U.S.
- Listed height: 6 ft 1 in (1.85 m)
- Listed weight: 235 lb (107 kg)

Career information
- High school: Bernards (Bernardsville)
- College: Maryland
- NFL draft: 1962: 7th round, 90th overall pick

Career history
- Baltimore Colts (1962)

Awards and highlights
- Second-team All-ACC (1961); 1961 James Tatum Memorial Award

Career NFL statistics
- Games played: 8
- Fumble recoveries: 1
- Stats at Pro Football Reference

William John Kirchiro (born June 29, 1940) is an American former professional football player who was a guard for the Baltimore Colts of the National Football League (NFL). He played college football for the Maryland Terrapins. Kirchiro was selected in the seventh round of the 1962 NFL draft and played in the league for one season.

Kirchiro was born in 1940 in Bernardsville, New Jersey, where he attended Bernards High School. He went to college at the University of Maryland. There, he played football for the Terrapins as an offensive guard. In 1961, Kirchiro was named to the All-ACC second-team and received the James Tatum Memorial Award for the Maryland Terrapins' Lineman of the Year.

Kirchiro was selected in the seventh round of the 1962 NFL draft by the St. Louis Cardinals. He instead went to play for the Baltimore Colts. During his only season in the NFL, Kirchiro played in eight games and recovered one opponent fumble.
