= Andy Bowling =

American football player (born 1945)

No. 51
- Position: Linebacker

Personal information
- Born: September 25, 1945 (age 81); Lynchburg, Virginia, U.S.
- Listed height: 6 ft 2 in (1.88 m)
- Listed weight: 235 lb (107 kg)

Career information
- High school: E. C. Glass (Lynchburg)
- College: Virginia Tech (1963–1966)
- NFL draft: 1967: 4th round, 105th overall pick

Career history
- St. Louis Cardinals (1967)*; Atlanta Falcons (1967)
- * Offseason or practice squad member only
- Stats at Pro Football Reference

Andrew Walter Bowling (born September 25, 1945) is an American former professional football player who was a linebacker for one season with the Atlanta Falcons of the National Football League (NFL). He played college football at Virginia Tech and was selected by the St. Louis Cardinals in the fourth round of the 1967 NFL/AFL draft.

== Early life and college ==
Andrew Walter Bowling was born on September 25, 1945, in Lynchburg, Virginia. He attended E. C. Glass High School in Lynchburg.

He was a member of the Virginia Tech Hokies from 1963 to 1966 and a three-year letterman from 1964 to 1966.

== Professional career ==
Bowling was selected by the St. Louis Cardinals in the fourth round, with the 105th overall pick, of the 1967 NFL draft. He signed with the Cardinals but was waived later in 1967.

Bowling claimed off waivers by the Atlanta Falcons in 1967. He played in six games for the Falcons during the 1967 season, recovering one fumble. He was released in 1968.
