= Roger Shoals =

American football player (1938–2025)

No. 75, 73
- Position: Offensive tackle

Personal information
- Born: December 13, 1938; Baltimore, Maryland, U.S.
- Died: June 30, 2025 (aged 86); Wynnewood, Pennsylvania, U.S.
- Listed height: 6 ft 4 in (1.93 m)
- Listed weight: 260 lb (118 kg)

Career information
- High school: Norwalk (Norwalk, Connecticut); Greenbrier Military School (Lewisburg, West Virginia)
- College: Maryland
- NFL draft: 1961: 16th round, 223rd overall pick
- AFL draft: 1962: 34th round, 267th overall pick

Career history
- Cleveland Browns (1963–1964); Detroit Lions (1965–1970); Denver Broncos (1971)

Awards and highlights
- NFL champion (1964); Second-team All-ACC (1961)

Career NFL statistics
- Games played: 104
- Games started: 70
- Fumble recoveries: 2
- Stats at Pro Football Reference

Roger Richard Shoals (December 13, 1938 – June 30, 2025) was an American professional football player who was an offensive tackle for nine seasons in the National Football League (NFL). He played college football for the Maryland Terrapins.

After retiring from the NFL, Shoals worked for Gould Paper Corporation for 30 years where he became vice president of sales. He was later 1/3 owner of a Cadillac-Buick-GMC dealership in Fleetwood, Pennsylvania.

Shoals died on June 30, 2025, at the age of 86.
