= 1961 All-Atlantic Coast Conference football team =

1961 American football team

The 1961 All-Atlantic Coast Conference football team consists of American football players chosen by various selectors for their All-Atlantic Coast Conference ("ACC") teams for the 1961 college football season. Selectors in 1961 included the Associated Press (AP).

== All-Atlantic Coast selections ==
=== Ends ===
- Gary Collins, Maryland (AP-1, UPI-1, ACSWA-1)
- Johnny Morris, NC State (UPI-1, ACSWA-1)
- Tommy King, Clemson (AP-1)
- Bill Hull, Wake Forest (AP-2, UPI-2)
- Bill Ruby, Wake Forest (AP-2, UPI-2)

=== Tackles ===
- Art Gregory, Duke (AP-1, UPI-1, ACSWA-1)
- Jim Moss, South Carolina (AP-1, UPI-1, ACSwA-1)
- Ron Gassert, Virginia (AP-2, UPI-2)
- Roger Shoals, Maryland (AP-2, UPI-2)

=== Guards ===
- Jean Berry, Duke (AP-1, UPI-1, ACSWA-1)
- Jim LeCompte, North Carolina (AP-1, UPI-1, ACSWA-1)
- Calvin West, Clemson (AP-2, UPI-2)
- Bill Kirchiro, Maryland (AP-2, UPI-2)

=== Centers ===
- Bob Hacker, Maryland (AP-1, ACSWA-1)
- Ron Andreo, Clemson (UPI-1)
- Joe Carver (or Craver), North Carolina (AP-2, UPI-2)

=== Backs ===
- Roman Gabriel, North Carolina State (AP-1 [quarterback], UPI-1 [quarterback], ACSWA-1)
- Bob Elliott, North Carolina (AP-1 [fullback], UPI-1 ACSWA-1)
- Alan White, Wake Forest (AP-1 [halfback], UPI-1, ACSWA-1)
- Gib Carson, North Carolina (AP-1 [halfback])
- Mark Leggett, Duke (UPI-2; AP-2)
- Billy Gambrell, South Carolina (UPI-1, ACSWA-1)
- Jim Parker, Clemson (AP-2, UPI-2)
- Walt Rappold, Duke (AP-2, UPI-2)
- Ray Farris, North Carolina (AP-2, UPI-2)

== Key ==
AP = Associated Press

UPI = United Press International

ACSWA = Atlantic Coast Sports Writers Association

== See also ==
- 1961 College Football All-America Team
