= 1964 Drake Bulldogs football team =

American college football season

1964 Drake Bulldogs football
- Conference: Independent
- Record: 6–4
- Head coach: Bus Mertes (5th season)
- Home stadium: Drake Stadium

1964 NCAA College Division independents football records
	Conf.			Overall
Team	W	L	T	W		L		T
Montclair State		–		7	–	0	–	0
East Carolina		–		9	–	1	–	0
Cortland		–		8	–	1	–	0
Santa Clara		–		7	–	2	–	0
Chattanooga		–		7	–	3	–	0
Parsons		–		6	–	3	–	0
St. Norbert		–		5	–	2	–	2
Northeastern		–		5	–	3	–	0
Northern Michigan		–		5	–	3	–	0
Drake		–		6	–	4	–	0
Mississippi Valley State		–		5	–	4	–	0
Arizona State–Flagstaff		–		5	–	4	–	0
Milwaukee		–		5	–	4	–	0
Howard (AL)		–		4	–	4	–	1
Wabash		–		3	–	3	–	2
Hawaii		–		4	–	5	–	0
Tampa		–		4	–	6	–	0
Lake Forest		–		3	–	5	–	0
UC Santa Barbara		–		4	–	7	–	0
Southern Connecticut State		–		2	–	6	–	1
Rose Poly		–		2	–	6	–	0
UC Riverside		–		2	–	7	–	0
Wheaton (IL)		–		2	–	7	–	0
Southern Illinois		–		2	–	8	–	0
Cal Poly Pomona		–		1	–	6	–	0
Carnegie Tech		–		1	–	8	–	0
Pacific (CA)		–		1	–	9	–	0

The 1964 Drake Bulldogs football team was an American football team that represented Drake University as an independent during the 1964 NCAA College Division football season. In its fifth and final season under head coach Bus Mertes, the team compiled a 6–4 record and outscored opponents by a total of 208 to 186.

The team's statistical leaders included sophomore quarterback Ron Royer (994 passing yards, 1,104 yards of total offense), senior fullback John Putnam (495 rushing yards), and senior end Steve Valasek (679 receiving yards).

The team played its home games at Drake Stadium in Des Moines, Iowa.

== Schedule ==
Date	Opponent	Site	Result	Attendance	Source
September 19	at Iowa State	Clyde Williams Field; Ames, IA	L 0–25	22,000	
September 26	at South Dakota	Inman Field; Vermillion, SD	W 28–14	4,000–4,500	
October 3	Western Illinois	Drake Stadium; Des Moines, IA	L 12–14	6,500–8,000	
October 10	at State College of Iowa	O. R. Latham Stadium; Cedar Falls, IA	L 14–41	6,000	
October 17	Southern Illinois	Drake Stadium; Des Moines, IA	L 19–28	3,200	
October 24	at Omaha	Omaha, NE	W 24–19		
October 31	Bradley	Drake Stadium; Des Moines, IA	W 46–19		
November 7	South Dakota State	Drake Stadium; Des Moines, IA	W 37–15		
November 14	Abilene Christian	Drake Stadium; Des Moines, IA	W 14–3	5,000	
November 21	at Louisville	Fairgrounds Stadium; Louisville, KY	W 14–8	1,997	
