= 1964 Milwaukee Panthers football team =

American college football season

1964 Milwaukee Panthers football
- Conference: Independent
- Record: 5–4
- Head coach: Wally Dreyer (5th season)
- Home stadium: Shorewood Stadium; Pearse Field

1964 NCAA College Division independents football records
	Conf.			Overall
Team	W	L	T	W		L		T
Montclair State		–		7	–	0	–	0
East Carolina		–		9	–	1	–	0
Cortland		–		8	–	1	–	0
Santa Clara		–		7	–	2	–	0
Chattanooga		–		7	–	3	–	0
Parsons		–		6	–	3	–	0
St. Norbert		–		5	–	2	–	2
Northeastern		–		5	–	3	–	0
Northern Michigan		–		5	–	3	–	0
Drake		–		6	–	4	–	0
Mississippi Valley State		–		5	–	4	–	0
Arizona State–Flagstaff		–		5	–	4	–	0
Milwaukee		–		5	–	4	–	0
Howard (AL)		–		4	–	4	–	1
Wabash		–		3	–	3	–	2
Hawaii		–		4	–	5	–	0
Tampa		–		4	–	6	–	0
Lake Forest		–		3	–	5	–	0
UC Santa Barbara		–		4	–	7	–	0
Southern Connecticut State		–		2	–	6	–	1
Rose Poly		–		2	–	6	–	0
UC Riverside		–		2	–	7	–	0
Wheaton (IL)		–		2	–	7	–	0
Southern Illinois		–		2	–	8	–	0
Cal Poly Pomona		–		1	–	6	–	0
Carnegie Tech		–		1	–	8	–	0
Pacific (CA)		–		1	–	9	–	0

The 1964 Milwaukee Panthers football team represented the University of Wisconsin–Milwaukee as an independent during the 1964 NCAA College Division football season. Led by Wally Dreyer in his fifth season as head coach, Milwaukee compiled a record of 5–4. The Panthers offense scored 184 points while the defense allowed 162 points.

== Schedule ==
Date	Opponent	Site	Result	Attendance	Source
September 12	at Bradley	Peoria Stadium; Peoria, IL	L 8–28		
September 19	Carroll (WI)	Shorewood Stadium; Shorewood, WI	W 19–14		
September 26	Oshkosh State	Shorewood Stadium; Shorewood, WI	L 12–19		
October 3	at Northern Illinois	Glidden Field; DeKalb, IL	L 18–29	9,107	
October 10	at Eastern Illinois	Lincoln Field; Charleston, IL	W 8–7	708	
October 17	Wayne State (MI)	Shorewood Stadium; Shorewood, WI	W 33–9		
October 31	Chicago Illini	Shorewood Stadium; Shorewood, WI	W 59–14		
November 7	Michigan Tech	Pearse Field; Milwaukee, WI	W 21–8	4,000	
November 14	North Dakota State	Pearse Field; Milwaukee, WI	L 6–34		
