= 1964 Mississippi Valley State Delta Devils football team =

American college football season

1964 Mississippi Valley State Delta Devils football
- Conference: Independent
- Record: 5–4
- Head coach: Doug Porter (4th season)
- Home stadium: Magnolia Stadium

1964 NCAA College Division independents football records
	Conf.			Overall
Team	W	L	T	W		L		T
Montclair State		–		7	–	0	–	0
East Carolina		–		9	–	1	–	0
Cortland		–		8	–	1	–	0
Santa Clara		–		7	–	2	–	0
Chattanooga		–		7	–	3	–	0
Parsons		–		6	–	3	–	0
St. Norbert		–		5	–	2	–	2
Northeastern		–		5	–	3	–	0
Northern Michigan		–		5	–	3	–	0
Drake		–		6	–	4	–	0
Mississippi Valley State		–		5	–	4	–	0
Arizona State–Flagstaff		–		5	–	4	–	0
Howard (AL)		–		4	–	4	–	1
Wabash		–		3	–	3	–	2
Hawaii		–		4	–	5	–	0
Milwaukee		–		4	–	5	–	0
Tampa		–		4	–	6	–	0
Lake Forest		–		3	–	5	–	0
UC Santa Barbara		–		4	–	7	–	0
Southern Connecticut State		–		2	–	6	–	1
Rose Poly		–		2	–	6	–	0
UC Riverside		–		2	–	7	–	0
Wheaton (IL)		–		2	–	7	–	0
Southern Illinois		–		2	–	8	–	0
Cal Poly Pomona		–		1	–	6	–	0
Carnegie Tech		–		1	–	8	–	0
Pacific (CA)		–		1	–	9	–	0

The 1964 Mississippi Valley State Delta Devils football team represented Mississippi Valley State College (now known as Mississippi Valley State University) as an independent school during the 1964 NCAA College Division football season. Led by fourth-year head coach Doug Porter, the Delta Devils compiled an overall record of 5–4.

== Schedule ==
Date	Opponent	Site	Result	Attendance	Source
September 19	at Arkansas AM&N	Pumphrey Stadium; Pine Bluff, AR	L 6–12	3,563	
September 26	at Jackson State	Alumni Field; Jackson, MS	L 9–11	5,275	
October 3	Alabama State	Magnolia Stadium; Itta Bena, MS	W 27–8		
October 10	at Mississippi Industrial	Holly Springs, MS	W 53–0		
October 17	Grambling	Magnolia Stadium; Itta Bena, MS	L 7–20		
October 31	Rust	Magnolia Stadium; Itta Bena, MS	W 40–6		
November 7	Alcorn A&M	Magnolia Stadium; Itta Bena, MS	W 8–6		
November 14	at Savannah State	Memorial Stadium; Savannah, GA	W 53–0		
November 21	at Texas Southern	Jeppesen Stadium; Houston, TX	L 18–42		
