= 1964 Long Beach State 49ers football team =

American college football season

1964 Long Beach State 49ers football
- Conference: California Collegiate Athletic Association
- Record: 8–2 (3–2 CCAA)
- Head coach: Don Reed (7th season)
- Home stadium: Veterans Memorial Stadium

1964 California Collegiate Athletic Association football standings
	Conf.					Overall
Team	W		L		T	W		L		T
No.3/1 Cal St Los Angeles $	5	–	0	–	0	9	–	0	–	0
No.5/7 San Diego State	4	–	1	–	0	8	–	2	–	0
Long Beach State	3	–	2	–	0	8	–	2	–	0
Fresno State	1	–	3	–	0	4	–	6	–	0
Valley State	1	–	3	–	0	4	–	6	–	0
Cal Poly	0	–	5	–	0	0	–	10	–	0
$ – Conference champion; Rankings from AP/UPI small college polls

The 1964 Long Beach State 49ers football team represented California State College, Long Beach—now known as California State University, Long Beach—as a member of the California Collegiate Athletic Association (CCAA) during the 1964 NCAA College Division football season. Led by seventh-year head coach Don Reed, the 49ers compiled an overall record of 8–2 with a mark of 3–2 in conference play, placing third in the CCAA. Long Beach State's two losses each came against teams then ranked No. 2 in the AP small college poll, San Diego State on October 10 and Cal State Los Angeles on November 14. The team played home games at Veterans Memorial Stadium adjacent to the campus of Long Beach City College in Long Beach, California.

== Schedule ==
Date	Time	Opponent	Site	Result	Attendance	Source
September 19	8:00 pm	at Nevada*	Mackay Stadium (Note: This stadium is the predecessor to the current Mackay Stadium, which was opened for the 1966 season.); Reno, NV	W 53–6	3,500	
September 26	8:00 pm	Cal Poly Pomona*	Veterans Memorial Stadium; Long Beach, CA	W 51–6	5,800–12,000	
October 3	2:00 pm	at Sacramento State*	Charles C. Hughes Stadium; Sacramento, CA	W 18–15	3,400–3,407	
October 10	8:00 pm	No. 2 San Diego State	Veterans Memorial Stadium; Long Beach, CA	L 8–45	11,761	
October 16	8:00 pm	UC Santa Barbara*	Veterans Memorial Stadium; Long Beach, CA	W 18–7	3,168	
October 24	8:00 pm	at Valley State	Monroe High; Sepulveda, CA	W 24–0	3,143–3,200	
October 31	8:00 pm	Cal Poly	Veterans Memorial Stadium; Long Beach, CA	W 47–0	4,285	
November 7	8:00 pm	at Fresno State	Ratcliffe Stadium; Fresno, CA	W 21–20	5,743–6,500	
November 14	8:00 pm	at No. 2 Cal State Los Angeles	Rose Bowl; Pasadena, CA	L 0–7	8,300–8,350	
November 21	8:00 pm	Pacific (CA)*	Veterans Memorial Stadium; Long Beach, CA	W 42–6	1,847	
*Non-conference game; Rankings from AP Poll released prior to the game

== Team players in the NFL/AFL ==
The following were selected in the 1965 NFL draft.

Player	Position	Round	Overall	NFL team
Roy Schmidt	Guard, tackle	13	178	Green Bay Packers

The following finished their college career in 1964, were not drafted, but played in the AFL (prior to the merger with the NFL).

Player	Position	First NFL/AFL team
Dick Degen	Linebacker	1965 San Diego Chargers
