= Herb Schmalenberger =

American sports coach and administrator (1925–2006)

Biographical details
- Born: January 27, 1925; Oakland, California, U.S.
- Died: June 26, 2006 (aged 81)

Playing career

Football
- 1948–1949: California

Coaching career (HC unless noted)

Football
- 1956: Cal Aggies (assistant)
- 1958: Cal Aggies
- 1964–1969: UC Davis

Basketball
- 1957–1958: Cal Aggies

Swimming
- 1957–1962: Cal Aggies / UC Davis

Administrative career (AD unless noted)
- 1972: UC Davis (interim AD)
- 1988: UC Davis (interim AD)

Head coaching record
- Overall: 28–38 (football); 5–17 (basketball)

Herbert A. Schmalenberger (January 27, 1925 – June 26, 2006) was an American football, basketball, and swimming coach and college athletics administrator. He served as the head football coach at University of California, Davis in 1958 and again from 1964 to 1969, compiling a record of 28–38. He was the men's swimming head coach there from 1957 to 1962 and the men's basketball head coach for the 1957–58 season. Schmalenberger was interim athletic director in 1972 and 1988.

== Personal life ==
Schmalenberger was born in 1925 in Oakland, California, where he first grew to love athletics while enrolled in an after-school sports program. He went on to play football and basketball in high school and received a scholarship to attend Washington State University in Pullman.

He studied briefly at Washington State and Willamette University before enlisting in the U.S. Navy during World War II, where he served as a submarine radioman for three years.

After World War II Schmalenberger returned to college, graduating with a bachelor's degree in physical education and a minor in history, as well as a California secondary teaching credential from UC Berkeley, where he played football for four years, including two Rose Bowl games. He helped coach the freshman football team during his fifth year at the university.

Schmalenberger went on to earn his master's degree from UC Berkeley in 1958 and completed coursework toward his doctorate at the University of Oregon while simultaneously teaching and coaching.

Schmalenberger was married for 58 years to his wife, Maxine, and had five children and seven grandchildren.

== Coaching career ==
After graduating from college, Schmalenberger taught high school physical education and history for five years before coming to UC Davis in 1956 as assistant football coach and physical education instructor. He coached the Aggies to a 7–2 record and a share of the Far Western Conference title.

During his 25 years at UC Davis, Schmalenberger served as vice chairman of the physical education department and supervisor in the teaching credential program. He also taught physical education activity and methods courses; he advised over 200 physical education major students during his tenure at UC Davis.

In his final season as head football coach, three of his players were drafted by the National Football League. He retired from the university in 1991.

Schmalenberger was active in promoting youth sports, establishing a summer sports program for local children and leading workshops for coaches throughout Northern California. He also served on the advisory commission for the Davis Recreation Department.

== Head coaching record ==
=== Football ===
Year	Team	Overall	Conference	Standing	Bowl/playoffs
Cal Aggies (Far Western Conference) (1958)
1958	Cal Aggies	5–4	3–2	T–2nd	
UC Davis Aggies (Far Western Conference) (1964–1968)
1964	UC Davis	3–6	2–3	4th	
1965	UC Davis	4–6	3–2	3rd	
1966	UC Davis	5–5	3–3	T–3rd	
1967	UC Davis	3–6	2–4	6th	
1968	UC Davis	5–4	3–3	T–3rd	
1969	UC Davis	3–7	0–5	6th	
Cal Aggies / UC Davis:		28–38	16–22		
Total:		28–38			
