= George Maderos =

American football player and coach (1933–2017)

No. 40
- Position: Defensive back

Personal information
- Born: November 3, 1933; Chico, California, U.S.
- Died: February 2, 2017 (aged 83); Chico, California, U.S.
- Listed height: 6 ft 1 in (1.85 m)
- Listed weight: 187 lb (85 kg)

Career information
- High school: Chico
- College: Chico State (1954)
- NFL draft: 1955: 21st round, 250th overall pick

Career history

Playing
- San Francisco 49ers (1955–1956)

Coaching
- Chico State (1958–1967) Head coach; Sacramento Capitols (1968) Offensive backfield coach; Sacramento Capitols (1969) Assistant coach

Career NFL statistics
- Interceptions: 4
- Fumble recoveries: 1
- Stats at Pro Football Reference

Head coaching record
- Regular season: 35–59–1 (.374)

George Maderos (November 3, 1933 – February 2, 2017) was an American professional football player who played for San Francisco 49ers of the National Football League (NFL). He played college football at California State University, Chico. He served as the head football coach at Chico State from 1958 to 1967, compiling a record of 35–59–1.

== Head coaching record ==
Year	Team	Overall	Conference	Standing	Bowl/playoffs
Chico State Wildcats (Far Western Conference) (1958–1967)
1958	Chico State	5–5	2–3	T–4th	
1959	Chico State	4–4	2–3	4th	
1960	Chico State	6–4	2–3	T–3rd	
1961	Chico State	4–6	0–5	6th	
1962	Chico State	4–4–1	2–3	T–4th	
1963	Chico State	2–7	0–5	6th	
1964	Chico State	0–9	0–5	6th	
1965	Chico State	4–6	0–5	6th	
1966	Chico State	4–6	1–5	T–6th	
1967	Chico State	2–8	0–6	7th	
Chico State:		35–59–1	9–43		
Total:		35–59–1			
