= 1964 Valley State Matadors football team =

American college football season

1964 Valley State Matadors football
- Conference: California Collegiate Athletic Association
- Record: 4–6 (1–3 CCAA)
- Head coach: Sam Winningham (3rd season)
- Home stadium: Monroe High School

1964 California Collegiate Athletic Association football standings
	Conf.					Overall
Team	W		L		T	W		L		T
No.3/1 Cal St Los Angeles $	5	–	0	–	0	9	–	0	–	0
No.5/7 San Diego State	4	–	1	–	0	8	–	2	–	0
Long Beach State	3	–	2	–	0	8	–	2	–	0
Fresno State	1	–	3	–	0	4	–	6	–	0
Valley State	1	–	3	–	0	4	–	6	–	0
Cal Poly	0	–	5	–	0	0	–	10	–	0
$ – Conference champion; Rankings from AP/UPI small college polls

The 1964 Valley State Matadors football team represented San Fernando Valley State College—now known as California State University, Northridge—as a member of the California Collegiate Athletic Association (CCAA) during the 1964 NCAA College Division football season. Led by third-year head coach Sam Winningham, Valley State compiled an overall record of 4–6 with a mark of 1–3 in conference play, tying for fourth place in the CCAA. The Matadors played home games at Monroe High School in Sepulveda, California.

== Schedule ==
Date	Opponent	Site	Result	Attendance	Source
September 19	UC Santa Barbara*	Monroe High School; Sepulveda, CA	W 7–0	2,500	
September 26	at Cal Poly	Mustang Stadium; San Luis Obispo, CA	W 21–6	3,946	
October 3	San Francisco State*	Monroe High School; Sepulveda, CA	W 16–7	2,500–3,600	
October 9	at Occidental*	Occidental Stadium; Los Angeles, CA	W 19–6	2,000	
October 17	Sacramento State*	Monroe High School; Sepulveda, CA	L 6–15	2,500–3,000	
October 24	Long Beach State	Monroe High School; Sepulveda, CA	L 0–24	3,143–3,200	
October 31	Whittier*	Monroe High School; Sepulveda, CA	L 12–20	3,000	
November 7	at Cal Poly Pomona*	Kellogg Field; Pomona, CA	L 12–26	2,400–2,800	
November 14	at No. 6 San Diego State	Aztec Bowl; San Diego, CA	L 0–53	8,500–10,800	
November 21	No. 2 Cal State Los Angeles	Monroe High SChool; Sepulveda, CA	L 20–62	3,327–5,000	
*Non-conference game; Rankings from AP Poll released prior to the game
