= 1964 Cal Poly Mustangs football team =

American college football season

1964 Cal Poly Mustangs football
- Conference: California Collegiate Athletic Association
- Record: 0–10 (0–5 CCAA)
- Head coach: Sheldon Harden (3rd season)
- Home stadium: Mustang Stadium

1964 California Collegiate Athletic Association football standings
	Conf.					Overall
Team	W		L		T	W		L		T
No.3/1 Cal St Los Angeles $	5	–	0	–	0	9	–	0	–	0
No.5/7 San Diego State	4	–	1	–	0	8	–	2	–	0
Long Beach State	3	–	2	–	0	8	–	2	–	0
Fresno State	1	–	3	–	0	4	–	6	–	0
Valley State	1	–	3	–	0	4	–	6	–	0
Cal Poly	0	–	5	–	0	0	–	10	–	0
$ – Conference champion; Rankings from AP/UPI small college polls

The 1964 Cal Poly Mustangs football team represented California Polytechnic State College—now known as California Polytechnic State University, San Luis Obispo—as a member of the California Collegiate Athletic Association (CCAA) during the 1964 NCAA College Division football season. Led by third-year head coach Sheldon Harden, Cal Poly compiled an overall record of 0–10 with a mark of 0–5 in conference play, placing last out of six teams in the CCAA. The Mustangs played home games at Mustang Stadium in San Luis Obispo, California.

== Schedule ==
Date	Opponent	Site	Result	Attendance	Source
September 19	San Francisco State*	Mustang Stadium; San Luis Obispo, CA	L 7–14	5,234–5,243	
September 26	Valley State	Mustang Stadium; San Luis Obispo, CA	L 6–21	3,946	
October 3	San Diego State	Mustang Stadium; San Luis Obispo, CA	L 7–59	4,100–4,126	
October 10	at Humboldt State*	Redwood Bowl; Arcata, CA	L 14–21	5,000–5,400	
October 17	at Fresno State	Ratcliffe Stadium; Fresno, CA	L 13–23	9,525–10,500	
October 24	at Cal Western*	Balboa Stadium; San Diego, CA	L 7–36	2,500	
October 31	at Long Beach State	Veterans Stadium; Long Beach, CA	L 0–47	4,285	
November 7	No. 2 Cal State Los Angeles	Mustang Stadium; San Luis Obispo, CA	L 7–68	2,009–3,800	
November 14	Idaho State*	Mustang Stadium; San Luis Obispo, CA	L 0–20	3,893–4,500	
November 21	at UC Santa Barbara*	La Playa Stadium; Santa Barbara, CA	L 13–26	6,000	
*Non-conference game; Rankings from UPI Poll released prior to the game

== Team players in the NFL ==
No Cal Poly Mustangs were selected in the 1965 NFL draft. However, one player who played for Cal Poly in 1964 then transferred to San Diego State was selected in the 1967 NFL/AFL draft.

Player	Position	Round	Overall	NFL team
Bob Howard	Defensive back	2	48	1967 San Diego Chargers
