= Phil Krueger (American football) =

American football player, coach, and executive (1929–2020)

Biographical details
- Born: October 6, 1929; LaSalle, Illinois, U.S.
- Died: June 22, 2020 (aged 90); Pembroke Pines, Florida, U.S.

Playing career
- 1948–1950: Southeast Missouri State
- Position: Quarterback

Coaching career (HC unless noted)
- 1960–1962: Long Beach (assistant)
- 1963: Utah State (OB)
- 1964–1965: Fresno State
- 1966–1970: USC (assistant)
- 1971–1972: Illinois (assistant)
- 1973–1975: Utah State
- 1976: Tampa Bay Buccaneers (OB)
- 1977: Tampa Bay Buccaneers (LB)
- 1978–1980: Tampa Bay Buccaneers (ST)

Administrative career (AD unless noted)
- 1986: Tampa Bay Buccaneers (GM)

Head coaching record
- Overall: 31–22

Phil Krueger (October 6, 1929 – June 22, 2020) was an American football player, coach, and executive. He served as the head football coach Fresno State University from 1964 to 1965 and at Utah State University from 1973 to 1975, compiling a career college football coaching record of 31–22.

Krueger quit the Fresno State head coaching job to join the staff of John McKay at the University of Southern California (USC) and was an assistant on the 1967 USC Trojans team that won a national championship. After leaving the Utah State job, he again worked for McKay on the staff of the National Football League's expansion Tampa Bay Buccaneers, from 1976 to 1980. He was the offensive backs coach in 1976, the linebackers coach in 1977 and coached the special teams from 1978 to 1980. He continued to work for the Tampa Bay Buccaneers front office in the 1980s, rising to general manager in 1986.

== Playing career and education ==
Krueger played college football as a quarterback at Southeast Missouri State College. He graduated from Southeast Missouri State in 1951 with a bachelor's degree in English. Krueger earned a master's degree in physical education from the University of Missouri in 1956.

== Head coaching record ==
Year	Team	Overall	Conference	Standing	Bowl/playoffs
Fresno State Bulldogs (California Collegiate Athletic Association) (1964–1965)
1964	Fresno State	4–6	1–3	T–4th	
1965	Fresno State	6–4	1–3	4th	
Fresno State:		10–10	2–6		
Utah State Aggies (NCAA Division I independent) (1973–1975)
1973	Utah State	7–4			
1974	Utah State	8–3			
1975	Utah State	6–5			
Utah State:		21–12			
Total:		31–22			
