= Don Campora =

American football player and coach (1927–1978)

No. 41, 76, 75, 60
- Position: Tackle

Personal information
- Born: August 30, 1927; Trenton, Utah, U.S.
- Died: June 5, 1978 (aged 50); San Bernardino, California, U.S.
- Listed height: 6 ft 3 in (1.91 m)
- Listed weight: 268 lb (122 kg)

Career information
- High school: Linden (Linden, California); Stockton (Stockton, California)
- College: Pacific (CA)
- NFL draft: 1950: 2nd round, 23rd overall pick

Career history

Playing
- San Francisco 49ers (1950, 1952); Washington Redskins (1953); Calgary Stampeders (1954)

Coaching
- Arizona State (1951) Assistant coach; Stockton (1955–1957) Line coach; Pacific (CA) (1958–1963) Line coach; Pacific (CA) (1964–1965) Head coach; San Bernardino (1976–1977) Head coach

Operations
- Pacific (CA) (1964–1966) Assistant athletic director; Calaveras HS (CA) (1966–1976) Athletic director

Career NFL statistics
- Games played: 25
- Games started: 20
- Stats at Pro Football Reference

Donald Carlo "Tiny" Campora (August 30, 1927 – June 5, 1978) was an American professional football player and coach. He played professionally in the National Football League (NFL) for the San Francisco 49ers in 1950 and 1952 and for the Washington Redskins in 1953. In 1954, he played with the Calgary Stampeders of the Canadian Football League (CFL). Campora played college football at the University of the Pacific in Stockton, California and served as the school's head football coach from 1964 to 1965. He was selected by the 49ers in the second round with the 23rd overall pick of the 1950 NFL draft.

Campora was a native of Stockton, where he attended high school. He worked as an assistant football coach at Arizona State University in 1951 under Larry Siemering, who coached Campora at Pacific. Campora served as a line coach at Stockton College (now known as a San Joaquin Delta College) from 1955 to 1957. He joined the coaching staff as his alma mater, Pacific, as line coach in December 1957.

In 1966, Campora was hired as the athletic director at Calaveras High School in San Andreas, California. He served as the head football coach at San Bernardino Valley College (SBVC) in San Bernardino, California from 1976 to 1977. In May 1978, he was named to succeed Gene Mazzei as SBVC's athletic director. However, Campora never took that position as he died on June 5, 1978, at San Bernardino County Medical Center, after suffering a heart attack.

== Head coaching record ==
=== College ===
Year	Team	Overall	Conference	Standing	Bowl/playoffs
Pacific Tigers (NCAA College Division independent) (1964–1965)
1964	Pacific	1–9			
1965	Pacific	1–8			
Pacific:		2–17			
Total:		2–17			

=== Junior college ===
Year	Team	Overall	Conference	Standing	Bowl/playoffs
San Bernardino Indians (Mission Conference) (1976–1977)
1976	San Bernardino	6–4	4–3	3rd	
1977	San Bernardino	3–7	1–6	T–6th	
San Bernardino:		9–11	5–9		
Total:		9–11			
