= 1964 Fresno State Bulldogs football team =

American college football season

1964 Fresno State Bulldogs football
- Conference: California Collegiate Athletic Association
- Record: 4–6 (1–3 CCAA)
- Head coach: Phil Krueger (1st season)
- Home stadium: Ratcliffe Stadium

1964 California Collegiate Athletic Association football standings
| | Conf. | | | | | Overall |
| Team | W | | L | | T | W | | L | | T |
|---|---|---|---|---|---|---|---|---|---|---|
| No.3/1 Cal St Los Angeles $ | 5 | – | 0 | – | 0 | 9 | – | 0 | – | 0 |
| No.5/7 San Diego State | 4 | – | 1 | – | 0 | 8 | – | 2 | – | 0 |
| Long Beach State | 3 | – | 2 | – | 0 | 8 | – | 2 | – | 0 |
| Fresno State | 1 | – | 3 | – | 0 | 4 | – | 6 | – | 0 |
| Valley State | 1 | – | 3 | – | 0 | 4 | – | 6 | – | 0 |
| Cal Poly | 0 | – | 5 | – | 0 | 0 | – | 10 | – | 0 |
$ – Conference champion; Rankings from AP/UPI small college polls

The 1964 Fresno State Bulldogs football team represented Fresno State College—now known as California State University, Fresno—as a member of the California Collegiate Athletic Association (CCAA) during the 1964 NCAA College Division football season. Led by first-year head coach Phil Krueger, Fresno State compiled an overall record of 4–6 with a mark of 1–3 in conference play, tying for fourth place in the CCAA. The Bulldogs played home games at Ratcliffe Stadium on the campus of Fresno City College in Fresno, California.

== Schedule ==
| Date | Opponent | Site | Result | Attendance | Source |
|---|---|---|---|---|---|
| September 19 | South Dakota State* | Ratcliffe Stadium; Fresno, CA | W 20–14 | 8,802 | |
| September 26 | at Montana State* | Gatton Field; Bozeman, MT | L 13–27 | 5,500–8,000 | |
| October 3 | Hawaii* | Ratcliffe Stadium; Fresno, CA (rivalry) | W 28–0 | 8,891 | |
| October 10 | at Idaho State* | Spud Bowl; Pocatello, ID | L 12–20 | 6,100–6,400 | |
| October 17 | Cal Poly | Ratcliffe Stadium; Fresno, CA | W 23–13 | 9,525–10,500 | |
| October 24 | at No. 5 Cal State Los Angeles | Rose Bowl; Pasadena, CA | L 12–32 | 8,000 | |
| October 31 | at No. 7 San Diego State | Aztec Bowl; San Diego, CA (rivalry) | L 6–44 | 12,000 | |
| November 7 | Long Beach State | Ratcliffe Stadium; Fresno, CA | L 20–21 | 5,743–6,500 | |
| November 14 | Pacific (CA)* | Ratcliffe Stadium; Fresno, CA | W 54–7 | 5,585 | |
| November 21 | at San Jose State* | Spartan Stadium; San Jose, CA (rivalry) | L 14–26 | 15,214 | |
*Non-conference game; Rankings from AP Poll released prior to the game

== Team players in the NFL ==
The following were selected in the 1965 NFL draft.

| Player | Position | Round | Overall | NFL team |
| Dave Plump | Defensive back | 12 | 156 | San Francisco 49ers |
