= Clarence Stasavich =

American football player and coach, college athletics administrator

- Stasavich pictured in The Buccaneer 1963, East Carolina yearbook

Biographical details
- Born: February 9, 1913; Illinois, U.S.
- Died: October 24, 1975 (aged 62); Greenville, North Carolina, U.S.

Playing career
- 1931–1934: Lenoir–Rhyne
- 1941: Charlotte Clippers
- Position: End

Coaching career (HC unless noted)
- 1938–1941: Lenoir–Rhyne (assistant)
- 1946–1961: Lenoir–Rhyne
- 1962–1969: East Carolina

Administrative career (AD unless noted)
- 1946–1961: Lenoir–Rhyne
- 1963–1975: East Carolina

Head coaching record
- Overall: 171–64–7
- Bowls: 5–1
- Tournaments: 3–1 (NAIA playoffs)

Accomplishments and honors

Championships
- 1 NAIA (1960); 9 North State / Carolinas Conference (1951–1952, 1955–1961); 1 SoCon (1966)

Awards
- NAIA Coach of the Year (1959)

Clarence Stasavich (February 9, 1913 – October 24, 1975) was an American football player, coach, and college athletics administrator. He served as the head football coach at Lenoir–Rhyne College—now known as Lenoir–Rhyne University—in Hickory, North Carolina from 1946 to 1961 and at East Carolina College—renamed East Carolina University in 1967—from 1963 to 1969, compiling a career college football head coaching record of 171–64–7. He led Lenoir–Rhyne to the NAIA Football National Championship in 1960. Stasavich was also the athletic director at Lenoir–Rhyne from 1946 to 1961 and East Carolina from 1963 to 1975.

== Playing career ==
Stasavich attended Lenoir–Rhyne College–now known as—Lenoir–Rhyne University in Hickory, North Carolina, where he played football for four years as an end. He also played basketball at Lenoir–Rhyne for four years, tennis for two, and baseball for one. In 1941, Stasavich played professional football for the Charlotte Clippers of the Dixie League.

== Coaching career ==
=== East Carolina ===
Stasavich was the head football coach at East Carolina from 1962 to 1969 and the athletic director from 1963 to 1975. During those eight years, Stasavich posted a 50–27–1 record. In 1963 East Carolina was 9–1 and recorded the program's first bowl game victory, against North Eastern in the Eastern Bowl. In 1964, Stasavich's team again posted a 9–1 record and beat UMass in the Tangerine Bowl, 14–13. The 1965 football season was a repeat of 1964's record and bowl appearance, except the Pirates won against Maine, 31–0, in the Tangerine Bowl. Also in 1965, Stasavich helped bring East Carolina into the Southern Conference. In 1969, Stasavich was the third-winningest active coach after Bear Bryant of Alabama and Johnny Vaught of Ole Miss.

== Death, awards, and honors ==
Stasavich died of a heart attack, on October 24, 1975, at Pitt County Memorial Hospital in Greenville, North Carolina.

Stasavich's love for the Southern Conference was honored when the conference named the football championship trophy the Clarence Stasavich Memorial Trophy. Stasavich was inducted into the North Carolina Sports Hall of Fame in 1970, the ECU Hall of Fame in 1976, the National Association of Directors of Athletics Hall of Fame in 1977, and the Florida Citrus Bowl Hall of Fame in 1986. Lenoir-Rhyne and the city of Hickory, North Carolina named one of the campus streets Stasavich Place in honor of his accomplishments. The street runs in front of the gymnasium and is the main entry to Helen and Leonard Moretz Stadium, the university's football facility.

== Head coaching record ==
Stasavich kneeling beside three senior football players at East Carolina

Year	Team	Overall	Conference	Standing	Bowl/playoffs
Lenoir–Rhyne Bears (North State Conference / Carolinas Conference) (1946–1961)
1946	Lenoir–Rhyne	5–6	3–5	T–5th	
1947	Lenoir–Rhyne	5–4–1	4–3–1	3rd	
1948	Lenoir–Rhyne	6–3–1	5–2–1	4th	
1949	Lenoir–Rhyne	7–3	5–3	5th	
1950	Lenoir–Rhyne	8–2	6–2	3rd	
1951	Lenoir–Rhyne	10–1	6–0	1st	W Pythian Bowl
1952	Lenoir–Rhyne	8–1	6–0	1st	L Cigar Bowl
1953	Lenoir–Rhyne	4–5	3–3	T–3rd	
1954	Lenoir–Rhyne	2–7–1	0–6	7th	
1955	Lenoir–Rhyne	9–0–1	6–0	1st	W Palmetto Shrine
1956	Lenoir–Rhyne	10–0	6–0	1st	
1957	Lenoir–Rhyne	8–2–1	5–1	1st	
1958	Lenoir–Rhyne	9–1	6–0	1st	
1959	Lenoir–Rhyne	10–1	6–0	1st	L NAIA Football National Championship
1960	Lenoir–Rhyne	12–0	6–0	1st	W NAIA Football National Championship
1961	Lenoir–Rhyne	8–1–1	6–1	1st	
Lenoir–Rhyne:		121–37–6	79–26–2		
East Carolina Pirates (NCAA College Division independent) (1962–1964)
1962	East Carolina	5–4			
1963	East Carolina	9–1			W Eastern Bowl
1964	East Carolina	9–1			W Tangerine Bowl
East Carolina Pirates (Southern Conference) (1965–1969)
1965	East Carolina	9–1	3–1	3rd	W Tangerine Bowl
1966	East Carolina	4–5–1	4–1–1	T–1st	
1967	East Carolina	8–2	4–1	2nd	
1968	East Carolina	4–6	2–2	T–2nd	
1969	East Carolina	2–7	1–3	5th	
East Carolina:		50–27–1	14–8–1		
Total:		171–64–7			
National championship Conference title Conference division title or championship game berth
