= Sam Bailey (coach) =

American sports coach (1924–2010)

Biographical details
- Born: January 29, 1924; Sanibel, Florida, U.S.
- Died: September 21, 2010 (aged 86); Sanibel, Florida, U.S.

Playing career

Football
- 1944–1945: Georgia
- 1946–1947: Long Island Indians
- 1947–1948: Richmond Rebels
- Position: End

Coaching career (HC unless noted)

Football
- 1950–1963: Tampa (assistant)
- 1964–1967: Tampa

Basketball
- 1950–1955: Tampa

Baseball
- 1961–1965: Tampa

Administrative career (AD unless noted)
- 1967–1971: Tampa

Head coaching record
- Overall: 16–20–1 (football); 45–66 (basketball); 55–53–1 (baseball)

Samuel M. Bailey (January 29, 1924 – September 21, 2010) was an American football, basketball, and baseball coach. He served as the head football coach at the University of Tampa from 1964 to 1967, compiling a record of 16–20–1. He was also school's head basketball coach from 1950 to 1955, tallying a mark of 45–66, and head baseball coach from 1961 to 1964, amassing a record of 55–53–1. Bailey played college football at the University of Georgia and was drafted by the Philadelphia Eagles in the 27th round of the 1946 NFL draft with the 257th overall pick.

== Head coaching record ==
=== Football ===
Year	Team	Overall	Conference	Standing	Bowl/playoffs
Tampa Spartans (NCAA College Division independent) (1964–1967)
1964	Tampa	4–6			
1965	Tampa	6–2–1			
1966	Tampa	4–5			
1967	Tampa	2–7			
Tampa:		7–9–3			
Total:		16–20–1			
