= 1964 San Francisco State Gators football team =

American college football season

1964 San Francisco State Gators football
- Conference: Far Western Conference
- Record: 6–3–1 (3–1–1 FWC)
- Head coach: Vic Rowen (4th season)
- Home stadium: Cox Stadium

1964 Far Western Conference football standings
	Conf.					Overall
Team	W		L		T	W		L		T
Sacramento State $	4	–	0	–	1	8	–	2	–	1
Humboldt State	4	–	1	–	0	8	–	2	–	0
San Francisco State	3	–	1	–	1	6	–	3	–	1
UC Davis	2	–	3	–	0	3	–	6	–	0
Nevada	1	–	4	–	0	1	–	9	–	0
Chico State	0	–	5	–	0	0	–	9	–	0
$ – Conference champion

The 1964 San Francisco State Gators football team represented San Francisco State College—now known as San Francisco State University—as a member of the Far Western Conference (FWC) during the 1964 NCAA College Division football season. Led by fourth-year head coach Vic Rowen, San Francisco State compiled an overall record of 6–3–1 with a mark of 3–1–1 in conference play, placing third in the FWC. For the season the team outscored its opponents 203 to 172. The Gators played home games at Cox Stadium in San Francisco.

== Schedule ==
Date	Opponent	Site	Result	Attendance	Source
September 19	at Cal Poly*	Mustang Stadium; San Luis Obispo, CA	W 14–7	5,234–5,243	
September 26	at San Diego State*	Aztec Bowl; San Diego, CA	L 0–54	12,110–12,500	
October 3	at Valley State*	Monroe High School; Sepulveda, CA	L 7–16	2,500–3,600	
October 10	Santa Clara*	Cox Stadium; San Francisco, CA	W 19–7	4,500	
October 17	Redlands*	Cox Stadium; San Francisco, CA	W 27–7	2,500	
October 24	UC Davis	Cox Stadium; San Francisco, CA	W 34–14	1,500	
October 31	at Humboldt State	Redwood Bowl; Arcata, CA	L 20–27	6,000–6,200	
November 7	Chico State	Cox Stadium; San Francisco, CA	W 41–14	3,200	
November 14	at Nevada	Mackay Stadium (Note: This stadium is the predecessor to the current Mackay Stadium, which was opened for the 1966 season.); Reno, NV	W 21–6	1,000–1,500	
November 21	Sacramento State	Cox Stadium; San Francisco, CA	T 20–20	5,000	
*Non-conference game
