= 1964 Delaware State Hornets football team =

American college football season

1964 Delaware State Hornets football
- Conference: Central Intercollegiate Athletic Association
- Record: 3–7 (3–5 CIAA)
- Head coach: Roy D. Moore (5th season)
- Home stadium: Alumni Stadium

1964 Central Intercollegiate Athletic Association football standings
	Conf.					Overall
Team	W		L		T	W		L		T
North Carolina A&T $	6	–	0	–	1	6	–	3	–	1
Morgan State	7	–	2	–	0	7	–	2	–	0
Howard	4	–	1	–	0	8	–	2	–	0
Johnson C. Smith	6	–	1	–	0	7	–	2	–	1
Maryland State	4	–	1	–	1	4	–	2	–	1
Virginia State	6	–	2	–	0	6	–	2	–	0
Virginia Union	6	–	3	–	0	6	–	3	–	0
Winston-Salem State	4	–	3	–	0	4	–	4	–	0
Elizabeth City State	4	–	4	–	0	4	–	4	–	0
Saint Paul's (VA)	3	–	4	–	0	3	–	6	–	0
St. Augustine's	4	–	5	–	0	5	–	5	–	0
Delaware State	3	–	5	–	0	3	–	7	–	0
North Carolina College	2	–	5	–	0	4	–	5	–	0
Shaw	2	–	6	–	1	2	–	7	–	1
Norfolk State	2	–	5	–	0	2	–	5	–	0
Fayetteville State	1	–	5	–	1	2	–	7	–	1
Livingstone	1	–	5	–	1	2	–	7	–	1
Hampton	0	–	7	–	0	1	–	8	–	0
$ – Conference champion

The 1964 Delaware State Hornets football team represented Delaware State College—now known as Delaware State University—as a member of the Central Intercollegiate Athletic Association (CIAA) in the 1964 NCAA College Division football season. Led by coach Roy D. Moore in his fifth and final season, the Hornets compiled a 3–7 record, 3–5 in their conference.

== Schedule ==
Date	Opponent	Site	Result	Attendance	Source
September 19	at Mansfield*	Mansfield, PA	L 0–7		
September 26	at Virginia State	Petersburg, VA	L 6–8		
October 3	Hampton	Alumni Stadium; Dover, DE	W 26–23		
October 10	at Howard	Washington, DC	L 16–32		
October 17	Johnson C. Smith	Alumni Stadium; Dover, DE	L 6–8		
October 24	at Morgan State	Hughes Stadium; Baltimore, MD	L 6–36		
October 31	Montclair State*	Alumni Stadium; Dover, DE	L 8–24	1,392	
November 7	at Maryland State	Princess Anne, MD	L 0–22	3,000+	
November 14	Saint Paul's (VA)	Alumni Stadium; Dover, DE	W 48–6		
November 21	at St. Augustine's	Raleigh, NC	W 18–6		
*Non-conference game
