= 1964 Nevada Wolf Pack football team =

American college football season

1964 Nevada Wolf Pack football
- Conference: Far Western Conference
- Record: 1–9 (1–4 FWC)
- Head coach: Dick Trachok (6th season)
- Home stadium: Mackay Stadium

1964 Far Western Conference football standings
	Conf.					Overall
Team	W		L		T	W		L		T
Sacramento State $	4	–	0	–	1	8	–	2	–	1
Humboldt State	4	–	1	–	0	8	–	2	–	0
San Francisco State	3	–	1	–	1	6	–	3	–	1
UC Davis	2	–	3	–	0	3	–	6	–	0
Nevada	1	–	4	–	0	1	–	9	–	0
Chico State	0	–	5	–	0	0	–	9	–	0
$ – Conference champion

The 1964 Nevada Wolf Pack football team represented the University of Nevada during the 1964 NCAA College Division football season. Nevada competed as a member of the Far Western Conference (FWC). The Wolf Pack were led by sixth-year head coach Dick Trachok and played their home games at Mackay Stadium.

== Schedule ==
Date	Opponent	Site	Result	Attendance	Source
September 19	Long Beach State*	Mackay Stadium; Reno, NV	L 6–53	3,500	
September 26	Willamette*	Mackay Stadium; Reno, NV	L 6–27	4,000	
October 3	at UC Santa Barbara*	La Playa Stadium; Santa Barbara, CA	L 0–14	4,000	
October 10	at Montana State*	Gatton Field; Bozeman, MT	L 14–21	4,500–4,700	
October 17	at Santa Clara*	Buck Shaw Stadium; Santa Clara, CA	L 20–43	6,420	
October 24	Humboldt State^{†}	Mackay Stadium; Reno, NV	L 8–17	5,000–6,000	
October 31	Sacramento State	Mackay Stadium; Reno, NV	L 0–28	2,500	
November 6	at UC Davis	Toomey Field; Davis, CA	L 6–21	4,100	
November 14	San Francisco State	Mackay Stadium; Reno, NV	L 6–21	1,000–1,500	
November 21	Chico State	Mackay Stadium; Reno, NV	W 38–8	3,000	
*Non-conference game; ^{†}Homecoming
