= 1964 Cal State Los Angeles Diablos football team =

American college football season

1964 Cal State Los Angeles Diablos football

UPI small college national champion CCAA champion
- Conference: California Collegiate Athletic Association

Ranking
- Coaches: No. 1 (UPI small college)
- AP: No. 3 (AP small college)
- Record: 9–0 (5–0 CCAA)
- Head coach: Homer Beatty (2nd season)
- Home stadium: Rose Bowl

1964 California Collegiate Athletic Association football standings
	Conf.					Overall
Team	W		L		T	W		L		T
No.3/1 Cal St Los Angeles $	5	–	0	–	0	9	–	0	–	0
No.5/7 San Diego State	4	–	1	–	0	8	–	2	–	0
Long Beach State	3	–	2	–	0	8	–	2	–	0
Fresno State	1	–	3	–	0	4	–	6	–	0
Valley State	1	–	3	–	0	4	–	6	–	0
Cal Poly	0	–	5	–	0	0	–	10	–	0
$ – Conference champion; Rankings from AP/UPI small college polls

The 1964 Cal State Los Angeles Diablos football team was an American football team that represented California State College at Los Angeles—now known as California State University, Los Angeles—as a member of the California Collegiate Athletic Association (CCAA) during the 1964 NCAA College Division football season. Led by second-year head coach Homer Beatty, Cal State Los Angeles compiled an overall record of 9–0 with a mark of 5–0 in conference play, winning the CCAA title. The Diablos began the season ranked No. 13 in the UPI small college poll. After defeating No. 1 San Diego State on the road, they jumped to No. 5. They went on to compile a perfect 9–0 record (5–0 against CCAA members), winning the CCAA championship and outscoring opponents by a total of 368 to 64, an average score of 41–7. It was the first perfect season in school history.

At the end of the season, the Diablos were selected by the UPI's board of coaches as the small college national champion. The team received 26 first-place votes to seven for No. 2 Wittenberg. In the Associated Press small college poll, the Diablos were ranked No. 3, behind Wittenberg and Prairie View.

Senior quarterback Dunn Marteen led the team in rushing (703 yards on 108 carries), passing (34 of 56 passes for 494 yards, seven touchdowns and one interception), total offense (1,197 yards), and scoring (104 points on 11 touchdowns, 32 extra point kicks, and three two-point conversions).

== Schedule ==
Date	Opponent	Rank	Site	Result	Attendance	Source
September 26	Hawaii*		Rose Bowl; Pasadena, CA	W 43–0	4,073	
October 3	at Pacific (CA)*	No. 13	Pacific Memorial Stadium; Stockton, CA	W 32–13	6,500–10,000	
October 17	at No. 1 San Diego State*	No. 13	Aztec Bowl; San Diego, CA	W 7–0	16,165	
October 24	Fresno State	No. 5	Rose Bowl; Pasadena, CA	W 32–12	8,000	
October 31	at Cal Poly Pomona	No. 4	Kellogg Field; Pomona, CA	W 55–6	2,700–4,000	
November 7	at Cal Poly*	No. 2	Mustang Stadium; San Luis Obispo, CA	W 68–7	2,009–3,800	
November 14	Long Beach State^{†}	No. 2	Rose Bowl; Pasadena, CA	W 7–0	8,300–8,350	
November 21	at Valley State	No. 2	Monroe High School; Sepulveda, CA	W 62–20	3,327–5,000	
November 27	Slippery Rock	No. 1	Rose Bowl; Pasadena, CA	W 62–6	15,836	
*Non-conference game; ^{†}Homecoming; Rankings from UPI Poll released prior to the game

== Key personnel ==
Coach Beatty led the Diablos to three consecutive CCAA championships and a 25–2 record from 1963 to 1965. He was selected as one of the inaugural inductees to the Cal State Los Angeles Hall of Fame when it was created in 1985.

The 1964 team was led by quarterback Dunn Marteen, an ex-Marine who was a junior college All-American at Santa Ana Junior College. Tackle Walter Johnson, a transfer from New Mexico State, starred on both offense and defense. Johnson was selected by the Cleveland Browns in the second round (27th overall pick) of the 1965 NFL draft and played 13 seasons in the NFL.

The Diablos dominated the 1964 All-CCAA football team with nine players receiving first-team honors: Marteen; Johnson (the only player named to both the defensive and offensive units); fullback Art Robinson; halfback Ray Jones; offensive tackle Don Davis; defensive end Walt Thurmond; linebacker Bernie Christian; and defensive backs Jesse Willard and George Youngblood.

== Players in the NFL ==
The following Cal State Los Angeles players were selected in the 1965 NFL draft.

Player	Position	Round	Overall	NFL team
Walter Johnson	Defensive tackle	2	27	Cleveland Browns
Art Robinson	Back	15	200	Chicago Bears
Mitch Johnson	Tackle, guard	17	229	Dallas Cowboys
