= 1964 Wittenberg Tigers football team =

American college football season

1964 Wittenberg Tigers football

AP small college national champion OAC champion
- Conference: Ohio Athletic Conference
- Record: 8–0 (7–0 OAC)
- Head coach: Bill Edwards (10th season)

1964 Ohio Athletic Conference football standings
	Conf.					Overall
Team	W		L		T	W		L		T
No. 1 Wittenberg $	7	–	0	–	0	8	–	0	–	0
Capital	7	–	1	–	0	7	–	1	–	0
Muskingum	7	–	1	–	0	8	–	2	–	0
Otterbein	4	–	3	–	0	6	–	3	–	0
Akron	4	–	3	–	0	6	–	3	–	0
Baldwin–Wallace	3	–	2	–	0	5	–	4	–	0
Denison	3	–	3	–	0	6	–	3	–	0
Mount Union	3	–	3	–	0	4	–	5	–	0
Wooster	3	–	4	–	0	5	–	4	–	0
Hiram	2	–	4	–	0	3	–	5	–	0
Heidelberg	2	–	4	–	0	3	–	5	–	1
Oberlin	1	–	4	–	0	3	–	5	–	0
Marietta	1	–	4	–	0	2	–	7	–	0
Ohio Wesleyan	1	–	5	–	0	2	–	7	–	0
Kenyon	0	–	6	–	0	0	–	8	–	0
$ – Conference champion; Rankings from AP small college poll

The 1964 Wittenberg Tigers football team was an American football team that represented Wittenberg University in the Ohio Athletic Conference (OAC) during the 1964 NCAA College Division football season. In their tenth year under head coach Bill Edwards, the Tigers compiled a perfect 8–0 record and won the OAC championship. The Tigers were also recognized by the Associated Press (AP) as the small college national champion, receiving the No. 1 ranking in the final poll of the season.

== Schedule ==
Date	Opponent	Rank	Site	Result	Attendance	Source
September 19	Baldwin–Wallace		Springfield, OH	W 28–26	6,500	
September 26	at Otterbein		Westerville, OH	W 40–6	4,500	
October 3	Heidelberg	No. 1	Springfield, OH	W 49–0	6,500–7,000	
October 10	at Akron	No. 1	Rubber Bowl; Akron, OH	W 7–0	5,512	
October 17	at Marietta	No. 1	Marietta, OH	W 35–0	3,500	
October 24	Denison^{†}	No. 1	Springfield, OH	W 40–14	7,000–7,500	
October 31	Ohio Wesleyan	No. 1	Springfield, OH	W 40–7	7,000	
November 7	at Wabash*	No. 1	Crawfordsville, IN	W 42–7	3,500	
*Non-conference game; ^{†}Homecoming; Rankings from AP Poll released prior to the game

== Season overview ==
=== "Little Men Who Think They Are Packers" ===
Sports Illustrated ran a feature story in November 1964 on the Wittenberg football team. The story appeared under the headline: "Some Little Men Who Think They Are Packers". On the comparison to the Green Bay Packers, the magazine wrote: "The fact that they are no such thing has nothing to do with it. The players think that they are and most of the time play as though they are." The magazine gave particular credit to coach Edwards who was described as "a sort of hybrid Santa Claus and Genghis Khan", an offensive line that had played together for four years, and to senior quarterback Charlie Green who possessed "a right arm that can get rid of a football so rapidly and with such accuracy that one opposing coach insists he is being aimed by an IBM computer."

=== Baldwin-Wallace ===
Wittenberg struggled in its opening game against Baldwin–Wallace. The Tigers trailed, 26–14, with 3:13 remaining in the game. Quarterback Charlie Green led two touchdown drives in the closing minutes, scoring on a four-yard run and then throwing a touchdown pass to Jim Miller with 15 seconds remaining. Wittenberg won by a narrow margin of 26–28.

=== Otterbein ===
On September 26, Wittenberg again fell behind early, trailing by a 6–0 score at the end of the first quarter. The Tigers' offense then came to life with two touchdowns in each of the remaining quarters. Charlie Green threw for two touchdowns and also had two rushing touchdowns.

=== Heidelberg ===
Wittenberg won its most lopsided victory on October 3, defeating Heidelberg by a 49–0 score. The Tigers scored 28 of their points in the first quarter. Halfback Bob Harvey scored three touchdowns, two of them on passes from Charlie Green. Green also threw touchdown passes to Rod Miller and Duncan.

=== Akron ===
Wittenberg's undefeated season survived a tough defensive performance by Akron on October 10. Akron stifled Wittenberg's passing attack by using four deep defensive backs and intercepting four of Charlie Green's passes. In his poorest showing of the season, Green completed only seven of 19 passes for 93 yards. The only touchdown of the game was scored in the first quarter on a pass from Green to Rod Miller.

=== Marietta ===
On October 17, the Tigers defeated Marietta, 35–0. Charlie Green completed 16 of 25 passes for 308 yards and four touchdowns. End Rod Miller scored twice on passes from Green.

=== Denison ===
On October 24, Wittenberg defeated Denison, 40–14, before a homecoming crowd of 7,500 in Springfield, Ohio. The victory was the 68th for coach Bill Edwards at Wittenberg, making him the winningest coach in school history.

=== Ohio Wesleyan ===
On October 31, Wittenberg clinched its fourth consecutive OAC title with a 40–7 victory over Ohio Wesleyan. The Tigers led 40–0 at the end of three quarters. Ohio Wesleyan did not score until the fourth quarter after Wittenberg's second and third string players took over. Charlie Green threw three touchdown passes, including passes covering 76 and 44 yards to Rod Miller.

=== Wabash ===
The Tigers concluded their season with a 42–7 victory over Wabash. Charlie Green completed 22 of 33 passes, passed for three touchdowns, and also scored two rushing touchdowns. Green's three touchdown passes gave him a total of 21 for the season, more than any other quarterback in the nation. The victory extended Wittenberg's unbeaten streak to 29 games.

=== Bowl game vetoed ===
After the season, the players voted unanimously to continue Wittenberg's policy against participating in bowl games. OAC rules permitted freshmen to play, but the NCAA prohibited freshmen to participate. In announcing the vote against playing in a bowl game, co-captain Lew Lenkaitis said that unity was important to the team and "we don't want to compete anywhere that would require us to leave part of our team behind."

=== Final AP and UPI polls ===
During the 1960s, the small college national championship was determined by polls administered by the Associated Press (AP) and United Press International (UPI). The final AP poll was released on November 24 with Wittenberg ranked No. 1. Wittenberg had been ranked No. 1 by the AP since the first week of the season and received six of the 14 first place votes in the final poll – four more than any other team. In the final point tally, Wittenberg received 114 points to 101 points for black college national champion Prairie View.

The final UPI poll was released on December 1 with Wittenberg ranked No. 2 (278 points) behind the Cal State Los Angeles (318 points). Prairie View ranked ninth (119 points) in the UPI voting.

== Honors and awards ==
Charlie Green had been the team's starting quarterback since 1962 and, in those three years, led the team to a 25–0–1 record and three consecutive OAC titles. During the 1964 season, Green completed 117 of 198 passes for 1,811 yards, 21 touchdowns and 12 interceptions. At the end of the season, Green won the Mike Gregory Memorial Award as the best back in the OAC. He was also selected by the Associated Press as the first-team quarterback on the 1964 Little All-America college football team.

Three Wittenberg players were selected as first-team players on the 1964 All-OAC team selected by the conference coaches: quarterback Charlie Green; offensive end Ron Duncan; and offensive tackle Lew Lenkaitis. In addition, three Wittenberg players received second-team honors: offensive guard Alex Ross; linebacker Gary Reedy; and defensive back Tim Rummins. Sports Illustrated wrote that Duncan, at six feet six and 225 pounds, "stands out like a buffalo in a poodle kennel."
