= 1964 Tangerine Bowl =

American college football game

UMass Redmen	East Carolina Pirates
(8–1)	(8–1)
Yankee Conference	Independent
13	14
Head coach: Vic Fusia	Head coach: Clarence Stasavich
	1	2	3	4	Total
UMass	0	7	6	0	13
East Carolina	0	0	6	8	14
- Date: December 12, 1964
- Season: 1964
- Stadium: Tangerine Bowl
- Location: Orlando, Florida
- MVP: TB Bill Cline (East Carolina)
- Attendance: 8,000

The 1964 Tangerine Bowl was an American college football bowl game between the East Carolina Pirates and the UMass Redmen, played in Orlando, Florida.

== Background ==
From 1964 through 1967, the Tangerine Bowl was one of four postseason games in the NCAA College Division, the Atlantic regional final. The 1964 game had the Redmen of the Yankee Conference and the independent Pirates.

The other three regional finals in the College Division were the Pecan, Grantland Rice, and Camellia bowls, also played on December 12.

== Game summary ==
The game ultimately was decided by special teams. The Redmen scored twice on Jerry Whelchel touchdown passes. However, on the second extra point, Whelchel's kick went wide, and the lead was 13–0. The Pirates then came up with a touchdown on a George Richardson run to narrow the lead. But when they tried to make the deficit smaller, the 2-point conversion attempt failed, leaving it at 13–6. In the fourth quarter, the Pirates went on a 90-yard drive, culminating in a 9-yard run by tailback Bill Cline. Rather than going for the tie, they went for the win; the 2-point conversion succeeded on a pass from Cline to Dave Bumgarner, giving the Pirates the lead and ultimately the win. Cline was named the game's MVP.^{note}

== Aftermath ==
East Carolina also played in the 1965 Tangerine Bowl and then moved to the University Division in 1966, and have since played in multiple bowl games at the Division I (now FBS) level. Massachusetts played in the Boardwalk Bowl in 1972; the team moved to the new Division I-AA (now FCS) in 1978, and then to FBS in 2012.

== Statistics ==
Statistics	Massachusetts	East Carolina
First downs	6	8
Yards rushing	135	153
Yards passing	153	192
Total yards	288	345
Interceptions	2	1

== Notes ==
^note Some websites state Massachusetts quarterback Jerry Whelchel was the game's MVP, however contemporary newspaper accounts only recognize Cline. The UMass website states Whelchel was his team's MVP ("UMass' MVP") for the game.
