= 1964 UC Davis Aggies football team =

American college football season

1964 UC Davis Aggies football
- Conference: Far Western Conference
- Record: 3–6 (2–3 FWC)
- Head coach: Herb Schmalenberger (2nd season)
- Captains: Ray DiGuilio; Mike Doyle
- Home stadium: Toomey Field

1964 Far Western Conference football standings
	Conf.					Overall
Team	W		L		T	W		L		T
Sacramento State $	4	–	0	–	1	8	–	2	–	1
Humboldt State	4	–	1	–	0	8	–	2	–	0
San Francisco State	3	–	1	–	1	6	–	3	–	1
UC Davis	2	–	3	–	0	3	–	6	–	0
Nevada	1	–	4	–	0	1	–	9	–	0
Chico State	0	–	5	–	0	0	–	9	–	0
$ – Conference champion

The 1964 UC Davis Aggies football team represented the University of California, Davis as a member of the Far Western Conference (FWC) during the 1964 NCAA College Division football season. Led by second-year head coach Herb Schmalenberger, who returned as head coach after leading the team in 1958, the Aggies compiled an overall record of 3–6 with a mark of 2–3 in conference play, placing fourth in the FWC. The team was outscored by its opponents 157 to 106 for the season. The Aggies played home games at Toomey Field in Davis, California.

The UC Davis sports teams were commonly called the "Cal Aggies" from 1924 until the mid 1970s.

== Schedule ==
Date	Opponent	Site	Result	Attendance	Source
September 19	at Santa Clara*	Buck Shaw Stadium; Santa Clara, CA	L 0–12	6,200	
October 3	at Whittier*	Hadley Field; Whittier, CA	L 6–33	2,200	
October 10	UC Santa Barbara*	Toomey Field; Davis, CA	L 0–28	5,100–5,135	
October 17	at Chico State	College Field; Chico, CA	W 19–3	7,000	
October 24	at San Francisco State	Cox Stadium; San Francisco, CA	L 14–34	1,500	
October 30	UC Riverside*	Toomey Field; Davis, CA	W 39–0	3,400	
November 6	Nevada	Toomey Field; Davis, CA	W 21–6	4,100	
November 14	at Sacramento State	Charles C. Hughes Stadium; Sacramento, CA (rivalry)	L 0–27	4,034	
November 21	Humboldt State	Toomey Field; Davis, CA	L 7–14	3,400–3,425	
*Non-conference game
