= 1964 Chico State Wildcats football team =

American college football season

1964 Chico State Wildcats football
- Conference: Far Western Conference
- Record: 0–9 (0–5 FWC)
- Head coach: George Maderos (7th season)
- Home stadium: College Field

1964 Far Western Conference football standings
	Conf.					Overall
Team	W		L		T	W		L		T
Sacramento State $	4	–	0	–	1	8	–	2	–	1
Humboldt State	4	–	1	–	0	8	–	2	–	0
San Francisco State	3	–	1	–	1	6	–	3	–	1
UC Davis	2	–	3	–	0	3	–	6	–	0
Nevada	1	–	4	–	0	1	–	9	–	0
Chico State	0	–	5	–	0	0	–	9	–	0
$ – Conference champion

The 1964 Chico State Wildcats football team represented Chico State College—now known as California State University, Chico—as a member of the Far Western Conference (FWC) during the 1964 NCAA College Division football season. Led by seventh-year head coach George Maderos, Chico State compiled an overall record of 0–9 with a mark of 0–5 in conference play, placing last out of six teams in the FWC. The team was outscored by its opponents 295 to 74 for the season. The Wildcats played home games at College Field in Chico, California.

== Schedule ==
Date	Opponent	Site	Result	Attendance	Source
September 26	at Lewis & Clark*	Griswold Stadium; Portland, OR	L 0–20		
October 3	Santa Clara*	College Field; Chico, CA	L 6–45	4,416	
October 10	Cal Western*	College Field; Chico, CA	L 20–33		
October 17	UC Davis	College Field; Chico, CA	L 3–19	7,000	
October 24	at Sacramento State	Charles C. Hughes Stadium; Sacramento, CA	L 6–45	5,135	
October 31	Oregon Tech*	College Field; Chico, CA	L 14–33		
November 7	at San Francisco State	Cox Stadium; San Francisco, CA	L 14–41	3,200	
November 14	at Humboldt State	Redwood Bowl; Arcata, CA	L 3–21	4,500	
November 21	at Nevada	Mackay Stadium (Note: This stadium is the predecessor to the current Mackay Stadium, which was opened for the 1966 season.); Reno, NV	L 8–38	3,000	
*Non-conference game
