= 1964 San Diego State Aztecs football team =

American college football season

1964 San Diego State Aztecs football

CCAA champion
- Conference: California Collegiate Athletic Association

Ranking
- Coaches: No. 7 (UPI small college)
- AP: No. 5 (AP small college)
- Record: 8–2 (4–1 CCAA)
- Head coach: Don Coryell (4th season)
- Defensive coordinator: John Madden (1st season)
- Home stadium: Aztec Bowl

1964 California Collegiate Athletic Association football standings
	Conf.					Overall
Team	W		L		T	W		L		T
No.3/1 Cal St Los Angeles $	5	–	0	–	0	9	–	0	–	0
No.5/7 San Diego State	4	–	1	–	0	8	–	2	–	0
Long Beach State	3	–	2	–	0	8	–	2	–	0
Fresno State	1	–	3	–	0	4	–	6	–	0
Valley State	1	–	3	–	0	4	–	6	–	0
Cal Poly	0	–	5	–	0	0	–	10	–	0
$ – Conference champion; Rankings from AP/UPI small college polls

The 1964 San Diego State Aztecs football team represented San Diego State College (Note: San Diego State University was known as San Diego State College from 1935 to 1971.) during the 1964 NCAA College Division football season.

San Diego State competed in the California Collegiate Athletic Association (CCAA). The team was led by head coach Don Coryell, in his fourth year, and played home games at Aztec Bowl.

The Aztecs were nationally rated as high as number 2 in the AP small college poll, and finished the year ranked number 5. They finished the season with eight wins and two losses (8–2, 4–1 CCAA). The offense averaged over 40 points a game, totaling 423 points during the season. The defense gave up less than 10 points in 9 of their games, giving up only 71 points in 10 games.

== Schedule ==
Date	Opponent	Rank	Site	Result	Attendance	Source
September 19	at Cal Poly Pomona*		Kellogg Field; Pomona, CA	W 53–8	3,200	
September 26	San Francisco State*		Aztec Bowl; San Diego, CA	W 54–0	12,110–12,500	
October 3	Cal Poly	No. 4 AP / 2 UPI	Aztec Bowl; San Diego, CA	W 59–7	4,100–4,126	
October 10	at Long Beach State	No. 2 AP / 2 UPI	Veterans Stadium; Long Beach, CA	W 45–8	11,761	
October 17	No. 12 UPI Cal State Los Angeles	No. 2 AP / 1 UPI	Aztec Bowl; San Diego, CA	L 0–7	16,165	
October 24	at UC Santa Barbara*	No. 4 AP / 7 UPI	La Playa Stadium; Santa Barbara, CA	W 50–9	5,000–6,000	
October 31	Fresno State	No. 7 AP / 5 UPI	Aztec Bowl; San Diego, CA (rivalry)	W 44–6	12,000	
November 14	Valley State	No. 6 AP / 5 UPI	Aztec Bowl; San Diego, CA	W 53–0	8,500–10,800	
November 21	Cal Western*	No. 5 AP / 3 UPI	Aztec Bowl; San Diego, CA	W 50–6	9,450	
November 28	at San Jose State*	No. 5 AP / 3 UPI	Spartan Stadium; San Jose, CA	L 15–20	7,154–7,500	
*Non-conference game; Rankings from AP/UPI Poll released prior to the game

== Team players in the NFL/AFL ==
The following San Diego State players were selected in the 1965 NFL draft.

Player	Position	Round	Overall	NFL team
Gary Garrison	Wide receiver – Split End	6	77	Philadelphia Eagles
Leon Standridge	End	18	240	San Francisco 49ers

The following San Diego State players were selected in the 1965 AFL Draft.

Player	Position	Round	Overall	NFL team
Jim Allison	Running back	12	94	San Diego Chargers
John Godden	Linebacker	16	126	San Diego Chargers

The following finished their San Diego State career in 1964, were not drafted, but played in the NFL/AFL.

Player	Position	First NFL team
John Milks	Linebacker	1965 San Diego Chargers

== Team awards ==
Award	Player
Most Valuable Player (John Simcox Memorial Trophy)	Gary Garrison
Outstanding Offensive & Defensive Linemen (Byron H. Chase Memorial Trophy)	Ed Johns
Most Inspirational Player	John Godden
