= 1964 Humboldt State Lumberjacks football team =

American college football season

1964 Humboldt State Lumberjacks football
- Conference: Far Western Conference
- Record: 8–2 (4–1 FWC)
- Head coach: Phil Sarboe (14th season)
- Home stadium: Redwood Bowl

1964 Far Western Conference football standings
	Conf.					Overall
Team	W		L		T	W		L		T
Sacramento State $	4	–	0	–	1	8	–	2	–	1
Humboldt State	4	–	1	–	0	8	–	2	–	0
San Francisco State	3	–	1	–	1	6	–	3	–	1
UC Davis	2	–	3	–	0	3	–	6	–	0
Nevada	1	–	4	–	0	1	–	9	–	0
Chico State	0	–	5	–	0	0	–	9	–	0
$ – Conference champion

The 1964 Humboldt State Lumberjacks football team represented Humboldt State College—now known as California State Polytechnic University, Humboldt—as a member of the Far Western Conference (FWC) during the 1964 NCAA College Division football season. Led by 14th-year head coach Phil Sarboe, the Lumberjacks compiled an overall record of 8–2 with a mark of 4–1 in conference play, placing second in the FWC. The team outscored opponents 181 to 81 for the season. Humboldt State played home games at the Redwood Bowl in Arcata, California.

== Schedule ==
Date	Opponent	Site	Result	Attendance	Source
September 26	Oregon Tech*	Redwood Bowl; Arcata, CA	W 41–0	6,000	
October 3	at Willamette*	McCulloch Stadium; Salem, OR	L 0–6	3,000	
October 10	Cal Poly*	Redwood Bowl; Arcata, CA	W 21–14	5,000–5,400	
October 16	at Hawaii*	Honolulu Stadium; Honolulu, HI	W 19–14	3,353–3,500	
October 24	at Nevada	Mackay Stadium (Note: This stadium is the predecessor to the current Mackay Stadium, which was opened for the 1966 season."University of Nevada, Reno; Mackay Stadium".); Reno, NV	W 17–8	5,000–6,000	
October 31	San Francisco State	Redwood Bowl; Arcata, CA	W 27–20	6,000–6,200	
November 7	at Sacramento State	Charles C. Hughes Stadium; Sacramento, CA	L 0–6	4,134–5,300	
November 14	Chico State	Redwood Bowl; Arcata, CA	W 21–3	4,500	
November 21	at UC Davis	Toomey Field; Davis, CA	W 14–7	3,400–3,425	
November 26	Whitworth*	Redwood Bowl; Arcata, CA	W 21–3	3,500	
*Non-conference game
