= 1964 Southern Illinois Salukis football team =

American college football season

1964 Southern Illinois Salukis football
- Conference: Independent
- Record: 2–8
- Head coach: Don Shroyer (1st season)
- Home stadium: McAndrew Stadium

1964 NCAA College Division independents football records
	Conf.			Overall
Team	W	L	T	W		L		T
Montclair State		–		7	–	0	–	0
East Carolina		–		9	–	1	–	0
Cortland		–		8	–	1	–	0
Santa Clara		–		7	–	2	–	0
Chattanooga		–		7	–	3	–	0
Parsons		–		6	–	3	–	0
St. Norbert		–		5	–	2	–	2
Northeastern		–		5	–	3	–	0
Northern Michigan		–		5	–	3	–	0
Drake		–		6	–	4	–	0
Mississippi Valley State		–		5	–	4	–	0
Arizona State–Flagstaff		–		5	–	4	–	0
Milwaukee		–		5	–	4	–	0
Howard (AL)		–		4	–	4	–	1
Wabash		–		3	–	3	–	2
Hawaii		–		4	–	5	–	0
Tampa		–		4	–	6	–	0
Lake Forest		–		3	–	5	–	0
UC Santa Barbara		–		4	–	7	–	0
Southern Connecticut State		–		2	–	6	–	1
Rose Poly		–		2	–	6	–	0
UC Riverside		–		2	–	7	–	0
Wheaton (IL)		–		2	–	7	–	0
Southern Illinois		–		2	–	8	–	0
Cal Poly Pomona		–		1	–	6	–	0
Carnegie Tech		–		1	–	8	–	0
Pacific (CA)		–		1	–	9	–	0

The 1964 Southern Illinois Salukis football team was an American football team that represented Southern Illinois University (now known as Southern Illinois University Carbondale) as an independent during the 1964 NCAA College Division football season. Under first-year head coach Don Shroyer, the team compiled a 2–8 record. The team played its home games at McAndrew Stadium in Carbondale, Illinois.

== Schedule ==
Date	Opponent	Site	Result	Attendance	Source
September 19	at Bowling Green	University Stadium; Bowling Green, OH	L 12–35	8,921–9,000	
September 26	Louisville	McAndrew Stadium; Carbondale, IL	W 7–6	11,000–12,500	
October 3	at Tulsa	Skelly Stadium; Tulsa, OK	L 7–63	12,126–13,626	
October 10	Fort Campbell	McAndrew Stadium; Carbondale, IL	L 9–16	11,100	
October 17	at Drake	Drake Stadium; Des Moines, IA	W 28–19	3,200	
October 24	at Northern Michigan	Memorial Field; Marquette, MI	L 18–33	3,300	
October 31	North Texas State	McAndrew Stadium; Carbondale, IL	L 13–14	14,000	
November 7	Lincoln (MO)	McAndrew Stadium; Carbondale, IL	L 21–23	8,000	
November 14	Toledo	McAndrew Stadium; Carbondale, IL	L 8–27	8,000–8,500	
November 21	Evansville	McAndrew Stadium; Carbondale, IL	L 0–2	1,500	
