= 1964 Sacramento State Hornets football team =

American college football season

1964 Sacramento State Hornets football

FWC champion

Camellia Bowl, L 7–28 vs. Montana State
- Conference: Far Western Conference
- Record: 8–2–1 (4–0–1 FWC)
- Head coach: Ray Clemons (4th season)
- Home stadium: Charles C. Hughes Stadium

1964 Far Western Conference football standings
	Conf.					Overall
Team	W		L		T	W		L		T
Sacramento State $	4	–	0	–	1	8	–	2	–	1
Humboldt State	4	–	1	–	0	8	–	2	–	0
San Francisco State	3	–	1	–	1	6	–	3	–	1
UC Davis	2	–	3	–	0	3	–	6	–	0
Nevada	1	–	4	–	0	1	–	9	–	0
Chico State	0	–	5	–	0	0	–	9	–	0
$ – Conference champion

The 1964 Sacramento State Hornets football team represented Sacramento State College—now known as California State University, Sacramento—as a member of the Far Western Conference (FWC) during the 1964 NCAA College Division football season. Led by fourth-year head coach Ray Clemons, Sacramento State compiled an overall record of 8–2–1 with a mark of 4–0–1 in conference play, winning the FWC title for the first time. For the season the team outscored its opponents 213 to 84 and had five shutout victories. The Hornets played home games at Charles C. Hughes Stadium in Sacramento, California.

At the end of the season, the Hornets were invited to play in the program's first bowl game, the Camellia Bowl, where Sacramento State was defeated by Montana State, 28–7, in the game played at the Hornets' home stadium.

== Schedule ==
Date	Opponent	Site	Result	Attendance	Source
September 19	Whittier*	Charles C. Hughes Stadium; Sacramento, CA	W 3–0	2,370	
September 26	at Santa Clara*	Buck Shaw Stadium; Santa Clara, CA	W 14–0	7,100	
October 3	at Long Beach State*	Veterans Stadium; Long Beach, CA	L 15–18	3,400–3,407	
October 10	Cal Poly Pomona*	Charles C. Hughes Stadium; Sacramento, CA	W 23–6	2,381–2,400	
October 17	at Valley State	Monroe High School; Sepulveda, CA	W 15–6	2,500–3,000	
October 24	Chico State	Charles C. Hughes Stadium; Sacramento, CA	W 45–6	5,135	
October 31	at Nevada	Mackay Stadium (Note: This stadium is the predecessor to the current Mackay Stadium, which was opened for the 1966 season.); Reno, NV	W 38–0	2,500	
November 7	Humboldt State	Charles C. Hughes Stadium; Sacramento, CA	W 6–0	4,134–5,300	
November 14	UC Davis	Charles C. Hughes Stadium; Sacramento, CA (rivalry)	W 27–0	4,034	
November 21	at San Francisco State	Cox Stadium; San Francisco, CA	T 20–20	5,000	
December 12	Montana State	Hughes Stadium; Sacramento, CA (Camellia Bowl)	L 7–28	10,000	
*Non-conference game
