= 1964 Pacific Tigers football team =

American college football season

1964 Pacific Tigers football
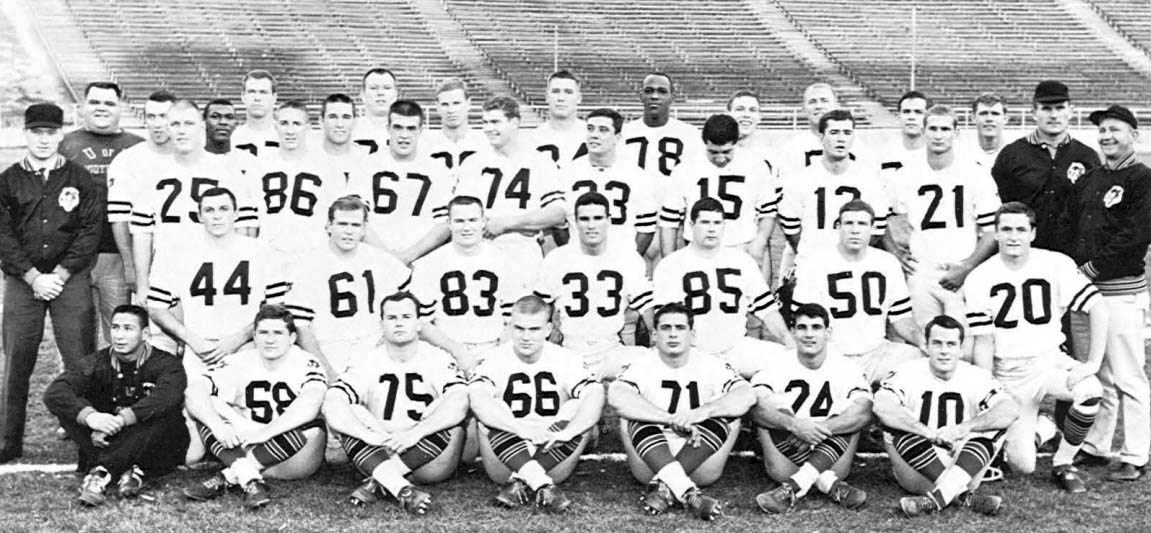
- Conference: Independent
- Record: 1–9
- Head coach: Don Campora (1st season)
- Home stadium: Pacific Memorial Stadium

1964 NCAA College Division independents football records
	Conf.			Overall
Team	W	L	T	W		L		T
Montclair State		–		7	–	0	–	0
East Carolina		–		9	–	1	–	0
Cortland		–		8	–	1	–	0
Santa Clara		–		7	–	2	–	0
Chattanooga		–		7	–	3	–	0
Parsons		–		6	–	3	–	0
St. Norbert		–		5	–	2	–	2
Northeastern		–		5	–	3	–	0
Northern Michigan		–		5	–	3	–	0
Drake		–		6	–	4	–	0
Mississippi Valley State		–		5	–	4	–	0
Arizona State–Flagstaff		–		5	–	4	–	0
Howard (AL)		–		4	–	4	–	1
Wabash		–		3	–	3	–	2
Hawaii		–		4	–	5	–	0
Milwaukee		–		4	–	5	–	0
Tampa		–		4	–	6	–	0
Lake Forest		–		3	–	5	–	0
UC Santa Barbara		–		4	–	7	–	0
Southern Connecticut State		–		2	–	6	–	1
Rose Poly		–		2	–	6	–	0
UC Riverside		–		2	–	7	–	0
Wheaton (IL)		–		2	–	7	–	0
Southern Illinois		–		2	–	8	–	0
Cal Poly Pomona		–		1	–	6	–	0
Carnegie Tech		–		1	–	8	–	0
Pacific (CA)		–		1	–	9	–	0

The 1964 Pacific Tigers football team represented the University of the Pacific (UOP) as an independent during the 1964 NCAA College Division football season. Led by first-year head coach Don Campora, the Tigers compiled a record of 1–9 and were outscored by opponents 304 to 68. Pacific was shut out four times, and failed to score more than a touchdown in seven of ten games. The team played home games at Pacific Memorial Stadium in Stockton, California.

== Schedule ==
Date	Opponent	Site	Result	Attendance	Source
September 19	Montana	Pacific Memorial Stadium; Stockton, CA	W 23–7	9,000	
September 26	at Colorado State	Colorado Field; Fort Collins, CO	L 0–7	10,100	
October 3	Cal State Los Angeles	Pacific Memorial Stadium; Stockton, CA	L 13–32	6,500–10,000	
October 10	at Washington State	Rogers Field; Pullman, WA	L 0–50	13,000	
October 17	at BYU	Cougar Stadium; Provo, UT	L 0–21	12,817	
October 24	San Jose State	Pacific Memorial Stadium; Stockton, CA (Victory Bell)	L 13–37	10,000	
October 31	Idaho	Pacific Memorial Stadium; Stockton, CA	L 0–40	7,500	
November 7	Santa Clara	Pacific Memorial Stadium; Stockton, CA	L 6–14		
November 14	at Fresno State	Ratcliffe Stadium; Fresno, CA	L 7–54	5,585	
November 21	at Long Beach State	Veterans Memorial Stadium; Long Beach, CA	L 6–42	1,847	
