= 1964 UC Santa Barbara Gauchos football team =

American college football season

1964 UC Santa Barbara Gauchos football
- Conference: Independent
- Record: 4–7
- Head coach: Jack Curtice (2nd season)
- Home stadium: La Playa Stadium

1964 NCAA College Division independents football records
| | Conf. | | | Overall |
| Team | W | L | T | W | | L | | T |
|---|---|---|---|---|---|---|---|---|
| Montclair State | | – | | 7 | – | 0 | – | 0 |
| East Carolina | | – | | 9 | – | 1 | – | 0 |
| Cortland | | – | | 8 | – | 1 | – | 0 |
| Santa Clara | | – | | 7 | – | 2 | – | 0 |
| Chattanooga | | – | | 7 | – | 3 | – | 0 |
| Parsons | | – | | 6 | – | 3 | – | 0 |
| St. Norbert | | – | | 5 | – | 2 | – | 2 |
| Northeastern | | – | | 5 | – | 3 | – | 0 |
| Northern Michigan | | – | | 5 | – | 3 | – | 0 |
| Drake | | – | | 6 | – | 4 | – | 0 |
| Mississippi Valley State | | – | | 5 | – | 4 | – | 0 |
| Arizona State–Flagstaff | | – | | 5 | – | 4 | – | 0 |
| Howard (AL) | | – | | 4 | – | 4 | – | 1 |
| Wabash | | – | | 3 | – | 3 | – | 2 |
| Hawaii | | – | | 4 | – | 5 | – | 0 |
| Milwaukee | | – | | 4 | – | 5 | – | 0 |
| Tampa | | – | | 4 | – | 6 | – | 0 |
| Lake Forest | | – | | 3 | – | 5 | – | 0 |
| UC Santa Barbara | | – | | 4 | – | 7 | – | 0 |
| Southern Connecticut State | | – | | 2 | – | 6 | – | 1 |
| Rose Poly | | – | | 2 | – | 6 | – | 0 |
| UC Riverside | | – | | 2 | – | 7 | – | 0 |
| Wheaton (IL) | | – | | 2 | – | 7 | – | 0 |
| Southern Illinois | | – | | 2 | – | 8 | – | 0 |
| Cal Poly Pomona | | – | | 1 | – | 6 | – | 0 |
| Carnegie Tech | | – | | 1 | – | 8 | – | 0 |
| Pacific (CA) | | – | | 1 | – | 9 | – | 0 |

The 1964 UC Santa Barbara Gauchos football team represented the University of California, Santa Barbara (UCSB) as an independent during the 1964 NCAA College Division football season. Led by second-year head coach Jack Curtice, the Gauchos compiled a record of 4–7 and were outscored by their opponents 164 to 152. The team played home games at La Playa Stadium in Santa Barbara, California.

== Schedule ==
| Date | Opponent | Site | Result | Attendance | Source |
|---|---|---|---|---|---|
| September 19 | at Valley State | Monroe High; Sepulveda, CA | L 0–7 | 2,500 | |
| September 26 | at Whittier | Hadley Field; Whittier, CA | L 6–19 | 3,000 | |
| October 3 | Nevada | La Playa Stadium; Santa Barbara, CA | W 14–0 | 4,000 | |
| October 10 | at UC Davis | Toomey Field; Davis, CA | W 28–0 | 5,100–5,135 | |
| October 16 | at Long Beach State | Veterans Memorial Stadium; Long Beach, CA | L 7–18 | 3,168 | |
| October 24 | No. 4 San Diego State | La Playa Stadium; Santa Barbara, CA | L 9–50 | 5,000–6,000 | |
| October 31 | at Santa Clara | Buck Shaw Stadium; Santa Clara, CA | L 0–21 | 5,140 | |
| November 7 | Cal Western (Note: Alliant International University was formed in 2001 via the merger of United States International University (USIU) and California School of Professional Psychology. USIU had been known as California Western University (Cal Western) from 1952 to 1967.) | La Playa Stadium; Santa Barbara, CA | L 7–9 | 7,800 | |
| November 14 | at UC Riverside | Highlander Stadium; Riverside, CA | W 48–7 | 400 | |
| November 21 | Cal Poly | La Playa Stadium; Santa Barbara, CA | W 26–13 | 6,000 | |
| November 28 | at Mexican All-Stars | Aztec Bowl; Mexico City, Mexico | L 7–20 | | |
Rankings from AP Poll released prior to the game
