= 1964 Cal Poly Pomona Broncos football team =

American college football season

1964 Cal Poly Pomona Broncos football
- Conference: Independent
- Record: 1–6
- Head coach: Don Warhurst (8th season)
- Home stadium: Kellogg Field

1964 NCAA College Division independents football records
	Conf.			Overall
Team	W	L	T	W		L		T
Montclair State		–		7	–	0	–	0
East Carolina		–		9	–	1	–	0
Cortland		–		8	–	1	–	0
Santa Clara		–		7	–	2	–	0
Chattanooga		–		7	–	3	–	0
Parsons		–		6	–	3	–	0
St. Norbert		–		5	–	2	–	2
Northeastern		–		5	–	3	–	0
Northern Michigan		–		5	–	3	–	0
Drake		–		6	–	4	–	0
Mississippi Valley State		–		5	–	4	–	0
Arizona State–Flagstaff		–		5	–	4	–	0
Howard (AL)		–		4	–	4	–	1
Wabash		–		3	–	3	–	2
Hawaii		–		4	–	5	–	0
Milwaukee		–		4	–	5	–	0
Tampa		–		4	–	6	–	0
Lake Forest		–		3	–	5	–	0
UC Santa Barbara		–		4	–	7	–	0
Southern Connecticut State		–		2	–	6	–	1
Rose Poly		–		2	–	6	–	0
UC Riverside		–		2	–	7	–	0
Wheaton (IL)		–		2	–	7	–	0
Southern Illinois		–		2	–	8	–	0
Cal Poly Pomona		–		1	–	6	–	0
Carnegie Tech		–		1	–	8	–	0
Pacific (CA)		–		1	–	9	–	0

The 1964 Cal Poly Pomona Broncos football team represented the Cal Poly Kellogg-Voorhis Unit—now known as California State Polytechnic University, Pomona—as an independent during the 1964 NCAA College Division football season. Led by eighth-year head coach Don Warhurst, Cal Poly Pomona compiled a record of 1–6. The team was outscored by its opponents 263 to 64 for the season. The Broncos played home games at Kellogg Field in Pomona, California.

== Schedule ==
Date	Opponent	Site	Result	Attendance	Source
September 19	San Diego State	Kellogg Field; Pomona, CA	L 8–53	3,200	
September 26	at Long Beach State	Veterans Stadium; Long Beach, CA	L 6–51	5,800–12,000	
October 10	at Sacramento State	Charles C. Hughes Stadium; Sacramento, CA	L 6–23	2,381–2,400	
October 17	Arizona State–Flagstaff	Kellogg Field; Pomona, CA	L 6–28	2,800	
October 31	No. 4 Cal State Los Angeles	Kellogg Field; Pomona, CA	L 6–55	2,700–4,000	
November 7	Valley State	Kellogg Field; Pomona, CA	W 26–12	2,400–2,800	
November 21	at Whittier	Hadley Field; Whittier, CA	L 6–41	1,600	
Rankings from UPI Poll released prior to the game
