= 1964 Arizona State–Flagstaff Lumberjacks football team =

American college football season

1964 Arizona State–Flagstaff Lumberjacks football
- Conference: Independent
- Record: 5–4
- Head coach: Max Spilsbury (9th season)
- Home stadium: Lumberjack Stadium

1964 NCAA College Division independents football records
	Conf.			Overall
Team	W	L	T	W		L		T
Montclair State		–		7	–	0	–	0
East Carolina		–		9	–	1	–	0
Cortland		–		8	–	1	–	0
Santa Clara		–		7	–	2	–	0
Chattanooga		–		7	–	3	–	0
Parsons		–		6	–	3	–	0
St. Norbert		–		5	–	2	–	2
Northeastern		–		5	–	3	–	0
Northern Michigan		–		5	–	3	–	0
Drake		–		6	–	4	–	0
Mississippi Valley State		–		5	–	4	–	0
Arizona State–Flagstaff		–		5	–	4	–	0
Howard (AL)		–		4	–	4	–	1
Wabash		–		3	–	3	–	2
Hawaii		–		4	–	5	–	0
Milwaukee		–		4	–	5	–	0
Tampa		–		4	–	6	–	0
Lake Forest		–		3	–	5	–	0
UC Santa Barbara		–		4	–	7	–	0
Southern Connecticut State		–		2	–	6	–	1
Rose Poly		–		2	–	6	–	0
UC Riverside		–		2	–	7	–	0
Wheaton (IL)		–		2	–	7	–	0
Southern Illinois		–		2	–	8	–	0
Cal Poly Pomona		–		1	–	6	–	0
Carnegie Tech		–		1	–	8	–	0
Pacific (CA)		–		1	–	9	–	0

The 1964 Arizona State–Flagstaff Lumberjacks football team was an American football team that represented Arizona State College at Flagstaff (now known as Northern Arizona University) as an independent during the 1964 NCAA College Division football season. In their ninth and final year under head coach Max Spilsbury, the Lumberjacks compiled a 5–4 record and outscored opponents by a total of 275 to 123. They defeated Colorado State–Greeley on the field, but the victory was later forfeited.

The team played its home games at Lumberjack Stadium in Flagstaff, Arizona.

== Schedule ==
Date	Time	Opponent	Site	Result	Attendance	Source
September 19		Weber State	Lumberjack Stadium; Flagstaff, AZ	W 41–6	4,300	
September 26		Arlington State	Lumberjack Stadium; Flagstaff, AZ	L 9–10	4,000–4,200	
October 3		at Idaho State	Spud Bowl; Pocatello, ID	W 28–21	4,500–6,000	
October 10		Colorado State–Greeley^{†}	Lumberjack Stadium; Flagstaff, AZ	L 45–7 (forfeit)	5,200	
October 17		at Cal Poly Pomona	Kellogg Field; Pomona, CA	W 28–6	2,800	
October 24		at New Mexico Western	Silver City, NM	W 56–6	1,200	
October 31		Adams State	Lumberjack Stadium; Flagstaff, AZ	W 33–0	5,000	
November 14		at Eastern New Mexico	Portales, NM	L 17–39	2,500	
November 21	8:00 p.m.	at Santa Clara	Buck Shaw Stadium; Santa Clara, CA	L 18–28	4,700	
^{†}Homecoming; All times are in Pacific time
