= 1964 Tampa Spartans football team =

American college football season

1964 Tampa Spartans football
- Conference: Independent
- Record: 4–6
- Head coach: Sam Bailey (1st season)
- Home stadium: Phillips Field

1964 NCAA College Division independents football records
	Conf.			Overall
Team	W	L	T	W		L		T
Montclair State		–		7	–	0	–	0
East Carolina		–		9	–	1	–	0
Cortland		–		8	–	1	–	0
Santa Clara		–		7	–	2	–	0
Chattanooga		–		7	–	3	–	0
Parsons		–		6	–	3	–	0
St. Norbert		–		5	–	2	–	2
Northeastern		–		5	–	3	–	0
Northern Michigan		–		5	–	3	–	0
Drake		–		6	–	4	–	0
Mississippi Valley State		–		5	–	4	–	0
Arizona State–Flagstaff		–		5	–	4	–	0
Howard (AL)		–		4	–	4	–	1
Wabash		–		3	–	3	–	2
Hawaii		–		4	–	5	–	0
Milwaukee		–		4	–	5	–	0
Tampa		–		4	–	6	–	0
Lake Forest		–		3	–	5	–	0
UC Santa Barbara		–		4	–	7	–	0
Southern Connecticut State		–		2	–	6	–	1
Rose Poly		–		2	–	6	–	0
UC Riverside		–		2	–	7	–	0
Wheaton (IL)		–		2	–	7	–	0
Southern Illinois		–		2	–	8	–	0
Cal Poly Pomona		–		1	–	6	–	0
Carnegie Tech		–		1	–	8	–	0
Pacific (CA)		–		1	–	9	–	0

The 1964 Tampa Spartans football team represented the University of Tampa in the 1964 NCAA College Division football season. It was the Spartans' 28th season. The team was led by head coach Sam Bailey, in his first year, and played their home games at Phillips Field in Tampa, Florida. They finished with a record of four wins and six losses (4–6).

== Schedule ==
Date	Opponent	Site	Result	Attendance	Source
September 12	at Jacksonville State	Paul Snow Stadium; Jacksonville, AL	L 8–10		
September 19	Virginia Tech	Phillips Field; Tampa, FL	L 14–18	7,300	
October 3	Memphis State	Phillips Field; Tampa, FL	L 0–13	9,000	
October 10	McNeese State	Phillips Field; Tampa, FL	L 0–12	4,500	
October 17	at Southwestern Louisiana	McNaspy Stadium; Lafayette, LA	L 6–37	10,500	
October 24	Presbyterian^{†}	Phillips Field; Tampa, FL	W 42–0	4,000	
October 31	at Northeast Louisiana State	Brown Stadium; Monroe, LA	W 7–6	5,500–7,000	
November 7	at Ole Miss	Hemingway Stadium; Oxford, MS	L 0–36	6,300	
November 14	Wofford	Phillips Field; Tampa, FL	W 22–14	3,000	
November 21	Western Carolina	Phillips Field; Tampa, FL	W 21–7	4,000	
^{†}Homecoming
