= 1964 UC Riverside Highlanders football team =

American college football season

1964 UC Riverside Highlanders football
- Conference: Independent
- Record: 2–7
- Head coach: Gil Allan (1st season)
- Home stadium: UCR Athletic Field

1964 NCAA College Division independents football records
| | Conf. | | | Overall |
| Team | W | L | T | W | | L | | T |
|---|---|---|---|---|---|---|---|---|
| Montclair State | | – | | 7 | – | 0 | – | 0 |
| East Carolina | | – | | 9 | – | 1 | – | 0 |
| Cortland | | – | | 8 | – | 1 | – | 0 |
| Santa Clara | | – | | 7 | – | 2 | – | 0 |
| Chattanooga | | – | | 7 | – | 3 | – | 0 |
| Parsons | | – | | 6 | – | 3 | – | 0 |
| St. Norbert | | – | | 5 | – | 2 | – | 2 |
| Northeastern | | – | | 5 | – | 3 | – | 0 |
| Northern Michigan | | – | | 5 | – | 3 | – | 0 |
| Drake | | – | | 6 | – | 4 | – | 0 |
| Mississippi Valley State | | – | | 5 | – | 4 | – | 0 |
| Arizona State–Flagstaff | | – | | 5 | – | 4 | – | 0 |
| Howard (AL) | | – | | 4 | – | 4 | – | 1 |
| Wabash | | – | | 3 | – | 3 | – | 2 |
| Hawaii | | – | | 4 | – | 5 | – | 0 |
| Milwaukee | | – | | 4 | – | 5 | – | 0 |
| Tampa | | – | | 4 | – | 6 | – | 0 |
| Lake Forest | | – | | 3 | – | 5 | – | 0 |
| UC Santa Barbara | | – | | 4 | – | 7 | – | 0 |
| Southern Connecticut State | | – | | 2 | – | 6 | – | 1 |
| Rose Poly | | – | | 2 | – | 6 | – | 0 |
| UC Riverside | | – | | 2 | – | 7 | – | 0 |
| Wheaton (IL) | | – | | 2 | – | 7 | – | 0 |
| Southern Illinois | | – | | 2 | – | 8 | – | 0 |
| Cal Poly Pomona | | – | | 1 | – | 6 | – | 0 |
| Carnegie Tech | | – | | 1 | – | 8 | – | 0 |
| Pacific (CA) | | – | | 1 | – | 9 | – | 0 |

The 1964 UC Riverside Highlanders football team represented the University of California, Riverside as an independent during the 1964 NCAA College Division football season. Led by Gil Allan in his first and only season as head coach, UC Riverside compiled a record of 2–7. The team was outscored by its opponents 213 to 54 for the season. The Highlanders played home games at UCR Athletic Field in Riverside, California.

== Schedule ==
| Date | Opponent | Site | Result | Attendance | Source |
|---|---|---|---|---|---|
| September 26 | Los Angeles Pacific (Note: Los Angeles Pacific College existed from 1926 to 1964. It merged with Azusa College in 1965 to become Azusa Pacific University. Azusa Pacific's official football records do not include the history from either of the predecessor schools.) | UCR Athletic Field; Riverside, CA | W 15–14 | | |
| October 3 | at Pomona | Claremont Alumni Field; Claremont, CA | L 7–21 | 4,600 | |
| October 10 | at Southern Utah | Cedar City, UT | L 6–36 | | |
| October 17 | La Verne | UCR Athletic Field; Riverside, CA | L 0–26 | | |
| October 24 | Claremont-Mudd | UCR Athletic Field; Riverside, CA | L 6–22 | | |
| October 30 | at UC Davis | Toomey Field; Davis, CA | L 0–39 | 3,400 | |
| November 7 | Caltech | UCR Athletic Field; Riverside, CA | W 13–0 | | |
| November 14 | UC Santa Barbara | UCR Athletic Field; Riverside, CA | L 7–48 | 400 | |
| November 21 | at Cal Lutheran | Mt. Clef Field; Thousand Oaks, CA | L 0–7 | | |
