= 1964 Hawaii Rainbows football team =

American college football season

1964 Hawaii Rainbows football
- Conference: Independent
- Record: 4–5
- Head coach: Jim Asato (3rd season)
- Home stadium: Honolulu Stadium

1964 NCAA College Division independents football records
| | Conf. | | | Overall |
| Team | W | L | T | W | | L | | T |
|---|---|---|---|---|---|---|---|---|
| Montclair State | | – | | 7 | – | 0 | – | 0 |
| East Carolina | | – | | 9 | – | 1 | – | 0 |
| Cortland | | – | | 8 | – | 1 | – | 0 |
| Santa Clara | | – | | 7 | – | 2 | – | 0 |
| Chattanooga | | – | | 7 | – | 3 | – | 0 |
| Parsons | | – | | 6 | – | 3 | – | 0 |
| St. Norbert | | – | | 5 | – | 2 | – | 2 |
| Northeastern | | – | | 5 | – | 3 | – | 0 |
| Northern Michigan | | – | | 5 | – | 3 | – | 0 |
| Drake | | – | | 6 | – | 4 | – | 0 |
| Mississippi Valley State | | – | | 5 | – | 4 | – | 0 |
| Arizona State–Flagstaff | | – | | 5 | – | 4 | – | 0 |
| Howard (AL) | | – | | 4 | – | 4 | – | 1 |
| Wabash | | – | | 3 | – | 3 | – | 2 |
| Hawaii | | – | | 4 | – | 5 | – | 0 |
| Milwaukee | | – | | 4 | – | 5 | – | 0 |
| Tampa | | – | | 4 | – | 6 | – | 0 |
| Lake Forest | | – | | 3 | – | 5 | – | 0 |
| UC Santa Barbara | | – | | 4 | – | 7 | – | 0 |
| Southern Connecticut State | | – | | 2 | – | 6 | – | 1 |
| Rose Poly | | – | | 2 | – | 6 | – | 0 |
| UC Riverside | | – | | 2 | – | 7 | – | 0 |
| Wheaton (IL) | | – | | 2 | – | 7 | – | 0 |
| Southern Illinois | | – | | 2 | – | 8 | – | 0 |
| Cal Poly Pomona | | – | | 1 | – | 6 | – | 0 |
| Carnegie Tech | | – | | 1 | – | 8 | – | 0 |
| Pacific (CA) | | – | | 1 | – | 9 | – | 0 |

The 1964 Hawaii Rainbows football team represented the University of Hawaiʻi at Mānoa as an independent during the 1964 NCAA College Division football season. In their third season under head coach Jim Asato, the Rainbows compiled a 4–5 record.

== Schedule ==
| Date | Opponent | Site | Result | Attendance | Source |
|---|---|---|---|---|---|
| September 7 | Hawaii 49ers | Honolulu Stadium; Honolulu, HI | W 6–2 | 5,023 | |
| September 19 | at Cal Western | Balboa Stadium; San Diego, CA | W 24–3 | 23,400 | |
| September 26 | at Cal State Los Angeles | Rose Bowl; Pasadena, CA | L 0–43 | 4,073 | |
| October 3 | at Fresno State | Ratcliffe Stadium; Fresno, CA (rivalry) | L 0–28 | 8,500 | |
| October 16 | Humboldt State | Honolulu Stadium; Honolulu, HI | L 14–19 | 3,353 | |
| November 13 | Redlands | Honolulu Stadium; Honolulu, HI | W 26–0 | 10,351 | |
| November 20 | New Mexico^{†} | Honolulu Stadium; Honolulu, HI | L 0–20 | 5,000 | |
| November 27 | Service Stars | Honolulu Stadium; Honolulu, HI | W 28–3 | 2,641 | |
| December 4 | Colorado State | Honolulu Stadium; Honolulu, HI | L 6–13 | 4,096 | |
^{†}Homecoming
