= 1964 Chattanooga Moccasins football team =

American college football season

1964 Chattanooga Moccasins football
- Conference: Independent
- Record: 7–3
- Head coach: Scrappy Moore (34th season)
- Home stadium: Chamberlain Field

1964 NCAA College Division independents football records
	Conf.			Overall
Team	W	L	T	W		L		T
Montclair State		–		7	–	0	–	0
East Carolina		–		9	–	1	–	0
Cortland		–		8	–	1	–	0
Santa Clara		–		7	–	2	–	0
Chattanooga		–		7	–	3	–	0
Parsons		–		6	–	3	–	0
St. Norbert		–		5	–	2	–	2
Northeastern		–		5	–	3	–	0
Northern Michigan		–		5	–	3	–	0
Drake		–		6	–	4	–	0
Mississippi Valley State		–		5	–	4	–	0
Arizona State–Flagstaff		–		5	–	4	–	0
Howard (AL)		–		4	–	4	–	1
Wabash		–		3	–	3	–	2
Hawaii		–		4	–	5	–	0
Milwaukee		–		4	–	5	–	0
Tampa		–		4	–	6	–	0
Lake Forest		–		3	–	5	–	0
UC Santa Barbara		–		4	–	7	–	0
Southern Connecticut State		–		2	–	6	–	1
Rose Poly		–		2	–	6	–	0
UC Riverside		–		2	–	7	–	0
Wheaton (IL)		–		2	–	7	–	0
Southern Illinois		–		2	–	8	–	0
Cal Poly Pomona		–		1	–	6	–	0
Carnegie Tech		–		1	–	8	–	0
Pacific (CA)		–		1	–	9	–	0

The 1964 Chattanooga Moccasins football team was an American football team that represented the University of Chattanooga (now known as the University of Tennessee at Chattanooga) during the 1964 NCAA College Division football season. In their 34th year under head coach Scrappy Moore, the team compiled a 7–3 record.

== Schedule ==
Date	Opponent	Site	Result	Attendance	Source
September 19	at Tennessee	Neyland Stadium; Knoxville, TN	L 6–10	28,000	
September 26	at Tennessee Tech	Overhill Field; Cookeville, TN	W 18–0	6,500	
October 3	East Tennessee State	Chamberlain Field; Chattanooga, TN	W 7–0		
October 10	at Auburn	Cliff Hare Stadium; Auburn, AL	L 12–33	31,000	
October 17	Middle Tennessee	Chamberlain Field; Chattanooga, TN	W 19–14	7,000	
October 24	at Xavier	Xavier Stadium; Cincinnati, OH	W 27–14	8,356	
October 31	Jacksonville State^{†}	Chamberlain Field; Chattanooga, TN	W 21–0		
November 7	at Southern Miss	Faulkner Field; Hattiesburg, MS	L 0–31	11,000	
November 14	Howard (AL)	Chamberlain Field; Chattanooga, TN	W 28–13		
November 26	Southeastern Louisiana	Chamberlain Field; Chattanooga, TN	W 21–0		
^{†}Homecoming
