= 1964 Montclair State Indians football team =

American college football season

1964 Montclair State Indians football
- Conference: Independent
- Record: 7–0
- Head coach: Jerry Edwards (5th season)
- Home stadium: Clifton High School Stadium

1964 NCAA College Division independents football records
	Conf.			Overall
Team	W	L	T	W		L		T
Montclair State		–		7	–	0	–	0
East Carolina		–		9	–	1	–	0
Cortland		–		8	–	1	–	0
Santa Clara		–		7	–	2	–	0
Chattanooga		–		7	–	3	–	0
Parsons		–		6	–	3	–	0
St. Norbert		–		5	–	2	–	2
Northeastern		–		5	–	3	–	0
Northern Michigan		–		5	–	3	–	0
Drake		–		6	–	4	–	0
Mississippi Valley State		–		5	–	4	–	0
Arizona State–Flagstaff		–		5	–	4	–	0
Howard (AL)		–		4	–	4	–	1
Wabash		–		3	–	3	–	2
Hawaii		–		4	–	5	–	0
Milwaukee		–		4	–	5	–	0
Tampa		–		4	–	6	–	0
Lake Forest		–		3	–	5	–	0
UC Santa Barbara		–		4	–	7	–	0
Southern Connecticut State		–		2	–	6	–	1
Rose Poly		–		2	–	6	–	0
UC Riverside		–		2	–	7	–	0
Wheaton (IL)		–		2	–	7	–	0
Southern Illinois		–		2	–	8	–	0
Cal Poly Pomona		–		1	–	6	–	0
Carnegie Tech		–		1	–	8	–	0
Pacific (CA)		–		1	–	9	–	0

1964 NAIA independents football records
	Conf.			Overall
Team	W	L	T	W		L		T
No. 10 Montclair State		–		7	–	0	–	0
Earlham		–		7	–	1	–	0
No. 3 Findlay ^		–		9	–	2	–	0
Hillsdale		–		7	–	2	–	1
Austin		–		6	–	3	–	0
Carson–Newman		–		6	–	3	–	0
Cal Lutheran		–		6	–	4	–	0
Southern Colorado State		–		6	–	4	–	0
La Verne		–		5	–	4	–	0
Georgetown (KY)		–		4	–	4	–	0
New Mexico Highlands		–		4	–	4	–	0
Eastern New Mexico		–		4	–	5	–	0
Oklahoma Panhandle State		–		4	–	6	–	1
McMurry		–		1	–	8	–	1
St. Mary of the Plains		–		1	–	7	–	0
^ – NAIA playoff participant; Rankings from NAIA poll

The 1964 Montclair State Indians football team was an American football team that represented Monclair State College (now known as Montclair State University) as an independent during the 1964 NCAA College Division football season and the 1964 NAIA football season. In their fifth year under head coach Jerry Edwards, the Indians compiled a perfect 7–0 record and outscored opponents by a total of 130 to 42. It was the third undefeated season in Montclair State history following the 1947 and 1960 seasons.

The team totaled 1,394 yards rushing and 488 yards passing. On defense, they held opponents to 672 rushing yards and 431 passing yards.

The team's statistical leaders included junior halfback Alex Zulewski with 97 carries for 346 rushing yards and 43 points scored; sophomore quarterback Jim Carovillano with 38 for 90 passing for 474 yards, four touchdowns and four interceptions; and junior end Mike Valentino Jr. with seven receptions for 127 yards and one touchdown.

== Schedule ==
Date	Opponent	Site	Result	Attendance	Source
October 2	Upsala	Clifton High School Stadium; Clifton, NJ	W 19–0	6,323	
October 10	at Central Connecticut State	New Britain, CT	W 23–7	3,216	
October 17	at Southern Connecticut State	Bowen Field; New Haven, CT	W 20–7	1,317	
October 24	at Glassboro State	Glassboro, NJ	W 21–20	2,613	
October 31	at Delaware State	Alumni Stadium; Dover, DE	W 24–8	1,392	
November 7	Trenton State	Clifton High School Stadium; Clifton, NJ	W 16–0	10,023	
November 14	Cortland State	Clifton High School Stadium; Clifton, NJ	W 7–0	8,211	
