= 1964 East Carolina Pirates football team =

American college football season

1964 East Carolina Pirates football

Tangerine Bowl champion

Tangerine Bowl, W 14–13 vs UMass
- Conference: Independent
- Record: 9–1
- Head coach: Clarence Stasavich (3rd season)
- Home stadium: Ficklen Memorial Stadium

1964 NCAA College Division independents football records
	Conf.			Overall
Team	W	L	T	W		L		T
Montclair State		–		7	–	0	–	0
East Carolina		–		9	–	1	–	0
Cortland		–		8	–	1	–	0
Santa Clara		–		7	–	2	–	0
Chattanooga		–		7	–	3	–	0
Parsons		–		6	–	3	–	0
St. Norbert		–		5	–	2	–	2
Northeastern		–		5	–	3	–	0
Northern Michigan		–		5	–	3	–	0
Drake		–		6	–	4	–	0
Mississippi Valley State		–		5	–	4	–	0
Arizona State–Flagstaff		–		5	–	4	–	0
Howard (AL)		–		4	–	4	–	1
Wabash		–		3	–	3	–	2
Hawaii		–		4	–	5	–	0
Milwaukee		–		4	–	5	–	0
Tampa		–		4	–	6	–	0
Lake Forest		–		3	–	5	–	0
UC Santa Barbara		–		4	–	7	–	0
Southern Connecticut State		–		2	–	6	–	1
Rose Poly		–		2	–	6	–	0
UC Riverside		–		2	–	7	–	0
Wheaton (IL)		–		2	–	7	–	0
Southern Illinois		–		2	–	8	–	0
Cal Poly Pomona		–		1	–	6	–	0
Carnegie Tech		–		1	–	8	–	0
Pacific (CA)		–		1	–	9	–	0

The 1964 East Carolina Pirates football team was an American football team that represented East Carolina College (now known as East Carolina University) as an independent during the 1964 NCAA College Division football season. In their third season under head coach Clarence Stasavich, the team compiled a 9–1 record.

== Schedule ==
Date	Opponent	Rank	Site	Result	Attendance	Source
September 12	Catawba		Ficklen Memorial Stadium; Greenville, NC	W 25–0	7,000	
September 19	at West Chester		Wayne Field; West Chester, PA	W 33–7	8,000	
September 26	Howard (AL)		Ficklen Memorial Stadium; Greenville, NC	W 31–20	13,000	
October 10	at Wofford		Snyder Field; Spartanburg, SC	W 21–0	6,000	
October 17	at Lenoir Rhyne		Moretz Stadium; Hickory, NC	W 33–14	7,000	
October 24	Richmond		Ficklen Memorial Stadium; Greenville, NC	L 20–22	13,000	
October 31	at The Citadel		Johnson Hagood Stadium; Charleston, SC	W 19–10	11,400	
November 7	at Furman		Sirrine Stadium; Greenville, SC	W 34–14	5,000	
November 14	Presbyterian		Ficklen Memorial Stadium; Greenville, NC	W 49–8	14,322	
December 12	vs. No. 7 UMass	No. 8	Tangerine Bowl; Orlando, FL (Tangerine Bowl)	W 14–13	7,500	
Rankings from AP Poll released prior to the game
