= 1964 small college football rankings =

- Selectors: AP, UPI
- No. 1: Wittenberg (AP)
- No. 1: Cal State Los Angeles (UPI)
- Small college football rankings (AP, UPI)
- «1963 1965»

The 1964 small college football rankings are rankings of college football teams representing smaller college and university teams during the 1964 college football season, including the 1964 NCAA College Division football season and the 1964 NAIA football season. Separate rankings were published by the Associated Press (AP) and the United Press International (UPI). The AP rankings were selected by a board of sports writers, and the UPI rankings were selected by a board of small-college coaches.

The 1964 Wittenberg Tigers football team (8–0), led by senior quarterback Charlie Green, was selected as the small-college national champion by the AP. The 1964 Cal State Los Angeles Diablos football team (9–0) was selected as the small-college champion by the UPI and rated No. 3 by the AP. Prairie View (9–0) was recognized as the black college national champion and rated at No. 2 by the AP and No. 8 by the UPI.

== Legend ==
	Increase in ranking
	Decrease in ranking
	Not ranked previous week
(#–#)	Win–loss record
(Italics)	Number of first place votes
т	Tied with team above or below also with this symbol

== AP poll ==
	Week 1 Sept 29	Week 2 Oct 6	Week 3 Oct 13	Week 4 Oct 20	Week 5 Oct 27	Week 6 Nov 3	Week 7 Nov 10	Week 8 Nov 17	Week 9 Nov 24	
1.	Wittenberg (1)	Wittenberg (3–0)	Wittenberg (4–0) (8)	Wittenberg (5–0) (8)	Wittenberg (6–0) (7)	Wittenberg (7–0) (12)	Wittenberg (8–0) (9)	Wittenberg (8–0) (8)	Wittenberg (8–0) (6)	1.
2.	Lamar Tech (2)	San Diego State (3–0)	San Diego State (4–0) (3)	Florida A&M (3–0) (1)	Prairie View A&M (5–0)	Prairie View A&M (6–0)	Louisiana Tech (8–0) (2)	Prairie View A&M (8–0)	Prairie View A&M (9–0)	2.
3.	Delaware (2)	Lamar Tech	Florida A&M (2–0)	Prairie View A&M (4–0)	Florida A&M (4–0)	Florida A&M (5–0) (1)	Florida A&M (6–0) (1)	Cal State Los Angeles (7–0) (1)	Cal State Los Angeles (8–0) (2)	3.
4.	San Diego State (1)	Prairie View A&M	Lamar Tech (2)	San Diego State (4–1)	Texas A&I (6–0)	Louisiana Tech (7–0) (1)	Prairie View A&M (7–0)	Louisiana Tech (8–1)	Louisiana Tech (9–1)	4.
5.	Southern Illinois (1)	Florida A&M (1–0) (1)	Prairie View A&M	Susquehanna (5–0)	Youngstown	San Diego State (6–1)	Cal State Los Angeles (6–0) (1)	San Diego State (7–1) (1)	San Diego State (8–1) (1)	5.
6.	Southwest Texas State (1)	Louisiana Tech (3–0)	Delaware (2–1)	Louisiana Tech (5–0)	Louisiana Tech (6–0)	Cal State Los Angeles (5–0)	San Diego State (6–1)	UMass (8–1) (2)	Concordia (MN) (10–0) (1)	6.
7.	Louisiana Tech	Susquehanna (3–0)	Susquehanna (4–0)	Texas A&I (5–0)	San Diego State (5–1)	Texas A&I (6–0–1)	Texas A&I (7–0–1)	Concordia (MN) (9–0)	UMass (8–1) (1)	7.
8.	Grambling State	Delaware (1–1)	Abilene Christian	Youngstown (4–0)	Susquehanna	Concordia (MN) (7–0)	UMass (7–1)	East Carolina (8–1)	East Carolina (8–1) (1)	8.
9.	Prairie View A&M	Cal State Los Angeles	Louisiana Tech (4–0)	Cal State Los Angeles (3–0) (1)	Cal State Los Angeles (4–0)	Arkansas State	Concordia (MN) (8–0)	Sam Houston State (8–0)	Florida A&M (7–1)	9.
10.	East Carolina	Northwestern State	Texas A&I (4–0)	Lamar Tech (3–1)	UMass (5–1) т	UMass (6–1)	Arkansas State	Texas A&I	Sam Houston State (8–1) (1)	10.
11.					Concordia (MN) (6–0) т					11.
	Week 1 Sept 29	Week 2 Oct 6	Week 3 Oct 13	Week 4 Oct 20	Week 5 Oct 27	Week 6 Nov 3	Week 7 Nov 10	Week 8 Nov 17	Week 9 Nov 24	
		Dropped: 5 Southern Illinois; 6 Southwest Texas State; 8 Grambling State; 10 East Carolina	Dropped: 9 Cal State Los Angeles; 10 Northwestern State	Dropped: 6 Delaware; 8 Abilene Christian	Dropped: 10 Lamar Tech	Dropped: 5 Youngstown; 8 Susquehanna	None	Dropped: 3 Florida A&M; 10 Arkansas State	Dropped: 10 Texas A&I	

== UPI coaches poll ==
	Week 1 Sept 30	Week 2 Oct 7	Week 3 Oct 14	Week 4 Oct 21	Week 5 Oct 28	Week 6 Nov 4	Week 7 Nov 11	Week 8 Nov 18	Week 9 Nov 25	Week 10 Dec 2	
1.	Delaware (1–0) (18)	Wittenberg (3–0) (6)	San Diego State (4–0) (9)	Wittenberg (5–0) (12)	Wittenberg (6–0) (18)	Wittenberg (7–0) (20)	Wittenberg (8–0) (18)	Wittenberg (8–0) (18)	Cal State Los Angeles (8–0) (15)	Cal State Los Angeles (9–0)	1.
2.	San Diego State (2–0) (2)	San Diego State (3–0) (8)	Wittenberg (4–0) (11)	Florida A&M (3–0) (2)	Texas A&I (6–0) (2)	Cal State Los Angeles (5–0) (6)	Cal State Los Angeles (6–0) (8)	Cal State Los Angeles (7–0) (9)	Wittenberg (8–0) (12)	Wittenberg (8–0)	2.
3.	Wittenberg (2–0) (1)	Florida A&M (1–0) (1)	Florida A&M (2–0) (4)	East Carolina (5–0) (4)	Florida A&M (4–0) (2)	Florida A&M (5–0) (1)	Louisiana Tech (8–0) (4)	San Diego State (7–1) (2)	San Diego State (8–1) (1)	UMass (8–1)	3.
4.	Montana State (3–0) (6)	East Carolina (3–0) (3)	East Carolina (4–0) (3)	Texas A&I (5–0) (2)	Cal State Los Angeles (4–0) (8)	San Diego State (6–1) (3)	Florida A&M (6–0)	UMass (8–1)	UMass (8–1) (1)	East Carolina (8–1)	4.
5.	Florida A&M (0–0) (1) т	UMass (2–1) (1)	UMass (3–1) (1)	Cal State Los Angeles (3–0) (5)	San Diego State (5–1)	Louisiana Tech (7–0) (2)	San Diego State (6–1) (1)	East Carolina (8–1) (1)	East Carolina (8–1) (1)	Concordia (MN) (10–0) т	5.
6.	East Carolina (3–0) т	Delaware (1–1) (3)	Texas A&I (4–0)	UMass (4–1) (1)	UMass (5–1) (1)	UMass (6–1)	UMass (7–1) (1) т	Louisiana Tech (8–1) (1)	Louisiana Tech (9–1) (2)	Louisiana Tech (9–1) т	6.
7.	Northeastern State (2–0)	Northeastern State (3–0)	Delaware (2–1) (2)	San Diego State (4–1) (2)	Louisiana Tech (6–0) (1)	Texas A&I (6–0–1)	Texas A&I (7–0–1) т	Western State (CO) (9–0) (2)	Western State (CO) (9–0) (2)	San Diego State (8–2)	7.
8.	Saint John's (MN) (1–0) (1)	Texas A&I (3–0) (1)	Montana State (3–2) (1)	Louisiana Tech (5–0) (1)	East Carolina (5–1)	East Carolina (6–1)	East Carolina (7–1)	Concordia (MN) (9–0)	Concordia (MN) (10–0) (1)	Prairie View (9–0)	8.
9.	UMass (1–1) (1)	Montana State (2–2) (2)	Louisiana Tech (4–0)	Montana State (4–2) (2)	Prairie View (5–0)	Gettysburg (6–1)	Gettysburg (7–1) (1)	Prairie View (8–0) т	Prairie View (9–0)	Sam Houston State (8–1)	9.
10.	Idaho State (2–0)	Gettysburg (3–0)	Idaho State (3–1)	Prairie View (4–0)	Western State (CO) (6–0) (2)	Western State (CO) (7–0) (2)	Western State (CO) (8–0) (2) т	Sam Houston State (8–0) (1) т	Florida A&M (7–1)	North Dakota State (9–1)	10.
11.	Texas A&I	Prairie View	Lamar Tech	Gettysburg	Gettysburg	Prairie View	Concordia (MN) (9–0) т	Florida A&M	Sam Houston State	Western State (CO)	11.
12.	Southwest Texas State	Chattanooga (1)	Cal State Los Angeles (2)	Delaware (1)	Delaware	Concordia (MN)	Prairie View	Texas A&I	North Dakota State	Florida A&M	12.
13.	Cal State Los Angeles (1) т	Cal State Los Angeles (2)	Prairie View	Lamar Tech	Montana State	Arizona State College	State College of Iowa	North Dakota State	North Dakota	Chattanooga	13.
14.	Northern Michigan т	Lamar Tech	Northeastern State	Northeastern State	Arizona State College т	State College of Iowa	Arizona State College	Linfield	Texas A&I	North Dakota т	14.
15.	Prairie View	Lewis & Clark	Lewis & Clark	Western State (CO)	Bucknell т	Arkansas State	Sam Houston State	North Dakota	Arkansas State	Arkansas State т	15.
16.	Chattanooga	Louisiana Tech (2) т	Gettysburg	Findlay	Arkansas State	Bucknell	Arkansas State	Gettysburg	Northeastern State	State College of Iowa т	16.
17.	Lewis & Clark	Western State (CO) т	Western State (CO) (1)	Southwest Texas State	Concordia (MN)	Sam Houston State	North Dakota State	Northeastern State	Gettysburg т	Bucknell т	17.
18.	Lamar Tech (1) т	Baldwin-Wallace (1) т	Abilene Christian	Bucknell	North Dakota State т	North Dakota State	North Dakota	Amherst т	Chattanooga т	Linfield	18.
19.	Omaha т	Idaho State т	North Dakota State	Albright т	Northeastern State т	Parsons	Northeast Missouri State т	Sacramento State т	Northern Michigan	Montana State т	19.
20.	Grambling State	Adams State т	Baldwin-Wallace	Arizona State College т	Sam Houston State	Whittier т	Linfield т	Arkansas State т	Sacramento State т	Washburn т	20.
21.		North Dakota State т				North Dakota State т		Northeast Missouri State т	State College of Iowa т		21.
22.									Bucknell т		22.
	Week 1 Sept 30	Week 2 Oct 7	Week 3 Oct 14	Week 4 Oct 21	Week 5 Oct 28	Week 6 Nov 4	Week 7 Nov 11	Week 8 Nov 18	Week 9 Nov 25	Week 10 Dec 2	
		Dropped: 8 Saint John's (MN); 12 Southwest Texas State; 14 Northern Michigan; 19 Omaha; 20 Grambling State	Dropped: 12 Chattanooga; 20 Adams State	Dropped: 10 Idaho State; 15 Lewis & Clark; 18 Abilene Christian; 19 North Dakota State; 20 Baldwin-Wallace	Dropped: 13 Lamar Tech; 16 Findlay; 17 Southwest Texas State; 19 Albright	Dropped: 12 Delaware; 13 Montana State; 19 Northeastern State	Dropped: 16 Bucknell; 19 Parsons; 20 Whittier	Dropped: 13 State College of Iowa; 14 Arizona State College	Dropped: 14 Linfield; 18 Amherst; 20 Northeast Missouri State	Dropped: 14 Texas A&I; 16 Northeastern State; 17 Gettysburg; 19 Northern Michigan; 20 Sacramento State	

== Pittsburgh Courier rankings ==
The Pittsburgh Courier, a leading African American newspaper, ranked the top 1964 teams from historically black colleges and universities in an era when college football was often racially segregated.

The rankings were published on December 19:

- 1. Prairie View A&M (9–0)
- 2. Florida A&M (9–1)
- 3. Grambling (9–2)
- 4. Tennessee A&I (8–2)
- 5. Lincoln (MO) (8–2)
- 6. North Carolina A&T (6–3–1)
- 7. Morgan State (7–2)
- 8. South Carolina State (7–2)
- 9. Virginia State (6–2)
- 10. Maryland State (4–2–1)
- 11. Jackson State (6–4)
- 12. Edward Waters (9–0)
- 13. Tuskegee (5–2–2)
- 14. Alabama A&M (6–1–1)
- 15. Johnson C. Smith (7–2–1)
- 16. Fort Valley State (6–2)
- 17. Kentucky State (7–3)
- 18. Bethune-Cookman (6–3)
- 19. Howard (8–2)
