= 1964 NCAA College Division football season =

American college football season

- Champion(s): Wittenberg (AP); Cal State Los Angeles (UPI); Prairie View A&M (black)

The 1964 NCAA College Division football season was the ninth season of college football in the United States organized by the National Collegiate Athletic Association at the NCAA College Division level.

== Conference standings ==
1964 Big Sky Conference football standings
	Conf.					Overall
Team	W		L		T	W		L		T
Montana State $	3	–	0	–	0	7	–	4	–	0
Idaho State	2	–	1	–	0	6	–	3	–	0
Montana	1	–	2	–	0	3	–	6	–	0
Weber State	0	–	3	–	0	2	–	6	–	0
Idaho *	0	–	0	–	0	4	–	6	–	0
$ – Conference champion; * – Insufficient number of games for conference championship

1964 California Collegiate Athletic Association football standings
	Conf.					Overall
Team	W		L		T	W		L		T
No.3/1 Cal St Los Angeles $	5	–	0	–	0	9	–	0	–	0
No.5/7 San Diego State	4	–	1	–	0	8	–	2	–	0
Long Beach State	3	–	2	–	0	8	–	2	–	0
Fresno State	1	–	3	–	0	4	–	6	–	0
Valley State	1	–	3	–	0	4	–	6	–	0
Cal Poly	0	–	5	–	0	0	–	10	–	0
$ – Conference champion; Rankings from AP/UPI small college polls

1964 Central Intercollegiate Athletic Association football standings
	Conf.					Overall
Team	W		L		T	W		L		T
North Carolina A&T $	6	–	0	–	1	6	–	3	–	1
Morgan State	7	–	2	–	0	7	–	2	–	0
Howard	4	–	1	–	0	8	–	2	–	0
Johnson C. Smith	6	–	1	–	0	7	–	2	–	1
Maryland State	4	–	1	–	1	4	–	2	–	1
Virginia State	6	–	2	–	0	6	–	2	–	0
Virginia Union	6	–	3	–	0	6	–	3	–	0
Winston-Salem State	4	–	3	–	0	4	–	4	–	0
Elizabeth City State	4	–	4	–	0	4	–	4	–	0
Saint Paul's (VA)	3	–	4	–	0	3	–	6	–	0
St. Augustine's	4	–	5	–	0	5	–	5	–	0
Delaware State	3	–	5	–	0	3	–	7	–	0
North Carolina College	2	–	5	–	0	4	–	5	–	0
Shaw	2	–	6	–	1	2	–	7	–	1
Norfolk State	2	–	5	–	0	2	–	5	–	0
Fayetteville State	1	–	5	–	1	2	–	7	–	1
Livingstone	1	–	5	–	1	2	–	7	–	1
Hampton	0	–	7	–	0	1	–	8	–	0
$ – Conference champion

1964 Central Intercollegiate Conference football standings
	Conf.					Overall
Team	W		L		T	W		L		T
No. 9 Washburn $	4	–	0	–	0	8	–	1	–	0
Fort Hays State	2	–	2	–	0	5	–	4	–	0
Omaha	2	–	2	–	0	5	–	4	–	0
Pittsburg State	2	–	2	–	0	4	–	5	–	0
Emporia State	0	–	4	–	0	0	–	9	–	0
$ – Conference champion; Rankings from NAIA poll

1964 College Athletic Conference football standings
	Conf.					Overall
Team	W		L		T	W		L		T
Sewanee +	3	–	1	–	0	8	–	1	–	0
Washington University +	3	–	1	–	0	6	–	3	–	1
Washington and Lee	2	–	2	–	0	4	–	5	–	0
Centre	1	–	3	–	0	4	–	4	–	1
Southwestern (TN)	1	–	3	–	0	3	–	5	–	0
+ – Conference co-champions

1964 College Conference of Illinois football standings
	Conf.					Overall
Team	W		L		T	W		L		T
Illinois Wesleyan $	5	–	0	–	1	7	–	1	–	1
Augustana (IL)	5	–	1	–	0	7	–	1	–	0
Carthage	4	–	2	–	0	4	–	4	–	0
North Central (IL)	2	–	3	–	1	4	–	3	–	1
Carroll (WI)	2	–	3	–	1	3	–	4	–	1
Millikin	1	–	4	–	1	1	–	6	–	1
North Park	0	–	6	–	0	0	–	8	–	0
$ – Conference champion

1964 Far Western Conference football standings
	Conf.					Overall
Team	W		L		T	W		L		T
Sacramento State $	4	–	0	–	1	8	–	2	–	1
Humboldt State	4	–	1	–	0	8	–	2	–	0
San Francisco State	3	–	1	–	1	6	–	3	–	1
UC Davis	2	–	3	–	0	3	–	6	–	0
Nevada	1	–	4	–	0	1	–	9	–	0
Chico State	0	–	5	–	0	0	–	9	–	0
$ – Conference champion

1964 Great Plains College Association football standings
	Conf.					Overall
Team	W		L		T	W		L		T
Nebraska Wesleyan $	3	–	0	–	0	7	–	1	–	0
Hastings	2	–	1	–	0	6	–	3	–	0
Doane	1	–	2	–	0	3	–	5	–	1
Colorado College	0	–	3	–	0	1	–	7	–	0
$ – Conference champion

1964 Gulf States Conference football standings
	Conf.					Overall
Team	W		L		T	W		L		T
Louisiana Tech $	5	–	0	–	0	9	–	1	–	0
Southeastern Louisiana	4	–	1	–	0	6	–	3	–	0
McNeese State	3	–	2	–	0	6	–	3	–	0
Southwestern Louisiana	2	–	3	–	0	5	–	4	–	0
Northwestern State	1	–	4	–	0	4	–	5	–	0
Northeast Louisiana State	0	–	5	–	0	0	–	8	–	0
$ – Conference champion

1964 Hoosier Conference football standings
	Conf.					Overall
Team	W		L		T	W		L		T
Taylor $	5	–	0	–	0	5	–	4	–	0
Franklin (IN)	4	–	1	–	0	6	–	3	–	0
Indiana Central	2	–	3	–	0	3	–	6	–	0
Manchester (IN)	2	–	3	–	0	3	–	6	–	0
Anderson (IN)	1	–	4	–	0	2	–	7	–	0
Hanover	1	–	4	–	0	2	–	7	–	0
$ – Conference champion

1964 Indiana Collegiate Conference football standings
	Conf.					Overall
Team	W		L		T	W		L		T
Indiana State +	4	–	2	–	0	6	–	2	–	0
Valparaiso +	4	–	2	–	0	6	–	3	–	0
Ball State +	4	–	2	–	0	5	–	3	–	0
Butler +	4	–	2	–	0	4	–	4	–	0
Evansville +	4	–	2	–	0	4	–	4	–	0
DePauw	1	–	5	–	0	2	–	7	–	0
Saint Joseph's (IN)	0	–	6	–	0	0	–	8	–	0
+ – Conference co-champions

1964 Interstate Intercollegiate Athletic Conference football standings
	Conf.					Overall
Team	W		L		T	W		L		T
Northern Illinois +	3	–	1	–	0	7	–	2	–	0
Western Illinois +	3	–	1	–	0	6	–	3	–	0
Illinois State	2	–	2	–	0	5	–	4	–	0
Central Michigan	1	–	3	–	0	4	–	5	–	0
Eastern Illinois	1	–	3	–	0	3	–	6	–	0
+ – Conference co-champions

1964 Iowa Conference football standings
	Conf.					Overall
Team	W		L		T	W		L		T
No. 17 Central (IA) +	7	–	1	–	0	8	–	1	–	0
Upper Iowa +	7	–	1	–	0	8	–	1	–	0
Luther	6	–	2	–	0	6	–	3	–	0
Simpson (IA)	5	–	3	–	0	6	–	3	–	0
Dubuque	3	–	5	–	0	3	–	5	–	1
Iowa Wesleyan	3	–	5	–	0	3	–	5	–	0
Buena Vista	2	–	5	–	1	3	–	5	–	1
Wartburg	2	–	5	–	1	2	–	6	–	1
William Penn	0	–	8	–	0	0	–	9	–	0
+ – Conference co-champions; Rankings from NAIA poll

1964 Lone Star Conference football standings
	Conf.					Overall
Team	W		L		T	W		L		T
No. 2/10 Sam Houston State $^	5	–	1	–	0	9	–	1	–	1
No. 14/NR Sul Ross	4	–	1	–	1	7	–	3	–	1
Southwest Texas State	4	–	2	–	0	7	–	2	–	0
Texas A&I	3	–	2	–	1	7	–	2	–	1
Stephen F. Austin	3	–	3	–	0	4	–	5	–	0
East Texas State	1	–	5	–	0	2	–	7	–	0
Howard Payne	0	–	6	–	0	2	–	8	–	0
$ – Conference champion; ^ – NAIA playoff participant; Rankings from NAIA poll and AP small college poll

1964 Mason–Dixon Conference football standings
	Conf.					Overall
Team	W		L		T	W		L		T
Hampden–Sydney $	3	–	0	–	0	6	–	4	–	0
Western Maryland	2	–	1	–	0	4	–	5	–	0
Randolph–Macon	2	–	2	–	0	3	–	6	–	0
Bridgewater	1	–	2	–	0	3	–	5	–	0
Gallaudet	0	–	1	–	0	0	–	8	–	0
Johns Hopkins	0	–	2	–	0	2	–	6	–	0
$ – Conference champion

1964 Michigan Intercollegiate Athletic Association football standings
	Conf.					Overall
Team	W		L		T	W		L		T
Albion $	5	–	0	–	0	8	–	0	–	0
Olivet	4	–	1	–	0	6	–	3	–	0
Kalamazoo	3	–	2	–	0	5	–	3	–	0
Adrian	1	–	4	–	0	2	–	6	–	0
Alma	1	–	4	–	0	2	–	6	–	0
Hope	1	–	4	–	0	2	–	6	–	0
$ – Conference champion

1964 Mid-American Conference football standings
	Conf.					Overall
Team	W		L		T	W		L		T
Bowling Green $	5	–	1	–	0	9	–	1	–	0
Marshall	4	–	2	–	0	7	–	3	–	0
Miami (OH)	4	–	2	–	0	6	–	3	–	1
Ohio	3	–	2	–	1	5	–	4	–	1
Western Michigan	2	–	4	–	0	3	–	6	–	0
Kent State	1	–	4	–	1	3	–	5	–	1
Toledo	1	–	5	–	0	2	–	8	–	0
$ – Conference champion

1964 Middle Atlantic Conference football standings
	Conf.					Overall
Team	W		L		T	W		L		T
University Division
Gettysburg x	5	–	1	–	0	7	–	2	–	0
Bucknell	4	–	1	–	0	7	–	2	–	0
Temple	4	–	1	–	0	7	–	2	–	0
Delaware	3	–	3	–	0	4	–	5	–	0
Lafayette	0	–	4	–	2	0	–	7	–	2
Hofstra	0	–	3	–	1	6	–	3	–	1
Lehigh	0	–	3	–	1	1	–	7	–	1
Northern College Division
Wagner x	5	–	0	–	0	10	–	0	–	0
Albright	6	–	1	–	0	8	–	1	–	0
Juniata	3	–	3	–	0	4	–	4	–	0
Moravian	3	–	4	–	0	4	–	4	–	0
Upsala	2	–	4	–	0	3	–	5	–	0
Wilkes	1	–	5	–	0	1	–	6	–	0
Lycoming	1	–	5	–	0	1	–	7	–	0
Susquehanna *	2	–	0	–	0	7	–	2	–	0
Southern College Division
Franklin & Marshall x	7	–	0	–	0	8	–	0	–	0
Drexel	4	–	1	–	0	7	–	2	–	0
Muhlenberg	5	–	3	–	0	5	–	4	–	0
Lebanon Valley	4	–	4	–	0	4	–	4	–	0
Pennsylvania Military	4	–	4	–	0	4	–	5	–	0
Swarthmore	3	–	3	–	0	3	–	4	–	0
Dickinson	4	–	5	–	0	4	–	5	–	0
Western Maryland	2	–	4	–	0	4	–	5	–	0
Johns Hopkins	2	–	4	–	0	2	–	6	–	0
Ursinus	2	–	5	–	0	2	–	6	–	0
Haverford	0	–	5	–	0	0	–	6	–	1
West Chester *	0	–	0	–	0	6	–	2	–	0
x – Division champion/co-champions; * – Ineligible for championship due to insufficient conference games

1964 Midwest Athletic Association football standings
	Conf.					Overall
Team	W		L		T	W		L		T
No. 4 Tennessee A&I $	3	–	0	–	0	8	–	2	–	0
No. 5 Lincoln (MO)	2	–	1	–	0	8	–	2	–	0
No. 17 Kentucky State	1	–	2	–	0	7	–	3	–	0
Central State (OH)	0	–	3	–	0	3	–	5	–	0
$ – Conference champion; Rankings from Pittsburgh Courier

1964 Midwest Conference football standings
	Conf.					Overall
Team	W		L		T	W		L		T
Coe +	7	–	1	–	0	7	–	1	–	0
Cornell (IA) +	7	–	1	–	0	7	–	1	–	0
Ripon +	7	–	1	–	0	7	–	1	–	0
Beloit	5	–	3	–	0	5	–	3	–	0
Grinnell	5	–	3	–	0	5	–	3	–	0
St. Olaf	4	–	4	–	0	4	–	4	–	0
Lawrence	2	–	6	–	0	2	–	6	–	0
Monmouth (IL)	2	–	6	–	0	2	–	6	–	0
Knox	1	–	7	–	0	1	–	7	–	0
Carleton	0	–	8	–	0	0	–	8	–	0
+ – Conference co-champions

1964 Minnesota Intercollegiate Athletic Conference football standings
	Conf.					Overall
Team	W		L		T	W		L		T
No. 1 Concordia (MN) $^	7	–	0	–	0	10	–	0	–	1
Augsburg	5	–	2	–	0	6	–	3	–	0
Gustavus Adolphus	4	–	3	–	0	5	–	4	–	0
Saint John's (MN)	4	–	3	–	0	4	–	3	–	0
St. Thomas (MN)	3	–	4	–	0	3	–	6	–	0
Minnesota–Duluth	2	–	5	–	0	4	–	5	–	0
Hamline	2	–	5	–	0	2	–	7	–	0
Macalester	1	–	6	–	0	1	–	7	–	0
$ – Conference champion; ^ – NAIA playoff participant; Rankings from NAIA poll

1964 Missouri Intercollegiate Athletic Association football standings
	Conf.					Overall
Team	W		L		T	W		L		T
NE Missouri State $	5	–	0	–	0	8	–	2	–	0
SE Missouri State	4	–	1	–	0	5	–	5	–	0
SW Missouri State	3	–	2	–	0	6	–	4	–	0
NW Missouri State	2	–	3	–	0	6	–	3	–	0
Missouri–Rolla	1	–	4	–	0	1	–	8	–	0
Central Missouri State	0	–	5	–	0	1	–	8	–	0
$ – Conference champion

1964 North Central Conference football standings
	Conf.					Overall
Team	W		L		T	W		L		T
North Dakota State +	5	–	1	–	0	10	–	1	–	0
North Dakota +	5	–	1	–	0	8	–	1	–	0
State College of Iowa +	5	–	1	–	0	9	–	2	–	0
Morningside	2	–	4	–	0	4	–	5	–	0
South Dakota	2	–	4	–	0	3	–	6	–	0
South Dakota State	2	–	4	–	0	2	–	8	–	0
Augustana (SD)	0	–	6	–	0	1	–	8	–	0
+ – Conference co-champions

1964 Northern Intercollegiate Conference football standings
	Conf.					Overall
Team	W		L		T	W		L		T
Winona State $	5	–	0	–	0	6	–	1	–	0
Moorhead State	4	–	1	–	0	4	–	4	–	0
Bemidji State	3	–	2	–	0	4	–	4	–	0
Michigan Tech	2	–	3	–	0	4	–	4	–	1
Mankato State	1	–	4	–	0	2	–	7	–	0
St. Cloud State	0	–	5	–	0	1	–	7	–	0
$ – Conference champion

1964 Ohio Athletic Conference football standings
	Conf.					Overall
Team	W		L		T	W		L		T
No. 1 Wittenberg $	7	–	0	–	0	8	–	0	–	0
Capital	7	–	1	–	0	7	–	1	–	0
Muskingum	7	–	1	–	0	8	–	2	–	0
Otterbein	4	–	3	–	0	6	–	3	–	0
Akron	4	–	3	–	0	6	–	3	–	0
Baldwin–Wallace	3	–	2	–	0	5	–	4	–	0
Denison	3	–	3	–	0	6	–	3	–	0
Mount Union	3	–	3	–	0	4	–	5	–	0
Wooster	3	–	4	–	0	5	–	4	–	0
Hiram	2	–	4	–	0	3	–	5	–	0
Heidelberg	2	–	4	–	0	3	–	5	–	1
Oberlin	1	–	4	–	0	3	–	5	–	0
Marietta	1	–	4	–	0	2	–	7	–	0
Ohio Wesleyan	1	–	5	–	0	2	–	7	–	0
Kenyon	0	–	6	–	0	0	–	8	–	0
$ – Conference champion; Rankings from AP small college poll

1964 Ohio Valley Conference football standings
	Conf.					Overall
Team	W		L		T	W		L		T
Middle Tennessee $	6	–	1	–	0	7	–	2	–	1
Austin Peay	5	–	1	–	1	8	–	1	–	1
Western Kentucky	3	–	3	–	1	6	–	3	–	1
Murray State	3	–	3	–	1	5	–	4	–	1
Morehead State	3	–	4	–	0	5	–	4	–	0
East Tennessee State	3	–	4	–	0	5	–	5	–	0
Eastern Kentucky	2	–	4	–	1	3	–	5	–	1
Tennessee Tech	1	–	6	–	0	1	–	9	–	0
$ – Conference champion

1964 Pennsylvania State College Athletic Conference football standings
	Conf.					Overall
Team	W		L		T	W		L		T
East Division
No. 13 East Stroudsburg xy$	6	–	0	–	0	8	–	1	–	0
West Chester	5	–	1	–	0	6	–	2	–	0
Kutztown	2	–	3	–	1	4	–	3	–	1
Mansfield	2	–	3	–	1	4	–	4	–	1
Bloomsburg	2	–	3	–	1	2	–	5	–	1
Millersville	1	–	4	–	1	3	–	4	–	1
Cheyney	0	–	4	–	2	0	–	5	–	2
West Division
Indiana (PA) xy	6	–	0	–	0	8	–	2	–	0
Clarion	3	–	2	–	1	4	–	3	–	1
Shippensburg	3	–	3	–	0	4	–	4	–	0
California (PA)	2	–	3	–	1	4	–	4	–	1
Slippery Rock	2	–	3	–	1	3	–	5	–	1
Lock Haven	2	–	4	–	0	4	–	4	–	0
Edinboro	1	–	4	–	1	2	–	5	–	1
Championship: East Stroudsburg 27, Indiana (PA) 14
$ – Conference champion; x – Division champion/co-champions; y – Championship game participant; Rankings from NAIA poll

1964 Prairie College Conference football standings
	Conf.					Overall
Team	W		L		T	W		L		T
Principia $	2	–	0	–	0	6	–	3	–	0
Rose Poly	1	–	1	–	0	2	–	6	–	0
Illinois College	0	–	2	–	0	4	–	4	–	0
$ – Conference champion

1964 Presidents' Athletic Conference football standings
	Conf.					Overall
Team	W		L		T	W		L		T
Wayne State (MI) $	4	–	1	–	1	4	–	3	–	1
Bethany (WV)	4	–	2	–	0	5	–	3	–	0
Eastern Michigan	3	–	2	–	0	4	–	3	–	0
John Carroll	4	–	3	–	0	4	–	4	–	0
Thiel	4	–	3	–	0	4	–	4	–	0
Western Reserve	4	–	3	–	1	4	–	3	–	1
Washington & Jefferson	3	–	3	–	0	5	–	3	–	0
Allegheny	2	–	4	–	0	3	–	5	–	0
Case Tech	0	–	7	–	0	0	–	8	–	0
$ – Conference champion

1964 Rocky Mountain Conference football standings
	Conf.					Overall
Team	W		L		T	W		L		T
Western State (CO) $	3	–	0	–	0	9	–	1	–	0
Adams State	2	–	1	–	0	6	–	3	–	0
Colorado State–Greeley	1	–	2	–	0	4	–	5	–	0
Colorado Mines	0	–	3	–	0	0	–	9	–	0
$ – Conference champion

1964 Southern California Intercollegiate Athletic Conference football standings
	Conf.					Overall
Team	W		L		T	W		L		T
No. 8 Whittier $	4	–	0	–	0	9	–	1	–	0
Redlands	3	–	1	–	0	5	–	4	–	0
Occidental	3	–	2	–	0	5	–	4	–	0
Claremont-Mudd	2	–	3	–	0	6	–	3	–	0
Pomona	1	–	4	–	0	4	–	5	–	0
Caltech	0	–	3	–	0	1	–	6	–	0
$ – Conference champion; Rankings from NAIA poll

1964 Southland Conference football standings
	Conf.					Overall
Team	W		L		T	W		L		T
Lamar Tech $	3	–	0	–	1	6	–	3	–	1
Arkansas State	2	–	0	–	2	7	–	0	–	2
Trinity (TX)	2	–	2	–	0	3	–	7	–	0
Abilene Christian	1	–	3	–	0	5	–	5	–	0
Arlington State	0	–	3	–	1	3	–	6	–	1
$ – Conference champion

1964 Southwestern Athletic Conference football standings
	Conf.					Overall
Team	W		L		T	W		L		T
No. 5/2 Prairie View A&M $	7	–	0	–	0	9	–	0	–	0
No. 19/NR Grambling	6	–	1	–	0	9	–	2	–	0
Jackson State	4	–	3	–	0	6	–	4	–	0
Alcorn A&M	3	–	4	–	0	5	–	5	–	0
Arkansas AM&N	3	–	4	–	0	5	–	5	–	0
Texas Southern	3	–	4	–	0	5	–	5	–	0
Southern	2	–	5	–	0	4	–	6	–	0
Wiley	0	–	7	–	0	2	–	7	–	0
$ – Conference champion; Rankings from NAIA poll and AP small college poll

1964 Virginia Little Eight Conference football standings
	Conf.					Overall
Team	W		L		T	W		L		T
Hampden–Sydney $	4	–	1	–	0	6	–	4	–	0
Randolph–Macon	2	–	1	–	0	3	–	6	–	0
Frederick	1	–	1	–	0	4	–	7	–	0
Emory and Henry	1	–	1	–	0	2	–	8	–	0
Washington and Lee	1	–	2	–	0	4	–	5	–	0
Bridgewater	0	–	3	–	0	3	–	5	–	0
$ – Conference champion

1964 Wisconsin State University Conference football standings
	Conf.					Overall
Team	W		L		T	W		L		T
Eau Claire State $	7	–	1	–	0	7	–	2	–	0
La Crosse State	4	–	2	–	0	5	–	4	–	0
River Falls State	4	–	3	–	0	5	–	3	–	0
Whitewater State	3	–	2	–	1	3	–	5	–	1
Superior State	3	–	3	–	0	3	–	6	–	0
Oshkosh State	3	–	4	–	0	5	–	4	–	0
Stevens Point State	3	–	4	–	0	3	–	6	–	0
Stout State	2	–	5	–	0	3	–	6	–	0
Platteville State	0	–	5	–	1	1	–	5	–	2
$ – Conference champion

1964 Yankee Conference football standings
	Conf.					Overall
Team	W		L		T	W		L		T
UMass $	5	–	0	–	0	8	–	2	–	0
Vermont	3	–	1	–	0	7	–	1	–	0
Connecticut	2	–	1	–	1	4	–	4	–	1
Maine	2	–	3	–	0	5	–	3	–	0
Rhode Island	1	–	4	–	0	3	–	7	–	0
New Hampshire	0	–	4	–	1	1	–	6	–	1
$ – Conference champion

1964 NCAA College Division independents football records
	Conf.			Overall
Team	W	L	T	W		L		T
Montclair State		–		7	–	0	–	0
East Carolina		–		9	–	1	–	0
Cortland		–		8	–	1	–	0
Santa Clara		–		7	–	2	–	0
Chattanooga		–		7	–	3	–	0
Parsons		–		6	–	3	–	0
St. Norbert		–		5	–	2	–	2
Northeastern		–		5	–	3	–	0
Northern Michigan		–		5	–	3	–	0
Drake		–		6	–	4	–	0
Mississippi Valley State		–		5	–	4	–	0
Arizona State–Flagstaff		–		5	–	4	–	0
Howard (AL)		–		4	–	4	–	1
Wabash		–		3	–	3	–	2
Hawaii		–		4	–	5	–	0
Milwaukee		–		4	–	5	–	0
Tampa		–		4	–	6	–	0
Lake Forest		–		3	–	5	–	0
UC Santa Barbara		–		4	–	7	–	0
Southern Connecticut State		–		2	–	6	–	1
Rose Poly		–		2	–	6	–	0
UC Riverside		–		2	–	7	–	0
Southern Illinois		–		2	–	8	–	0
Cal Poly Pomona		–		1	–	6	–	0
Carnegie Tech		–		1	–	8	–	0
Pacific (CA)		–		1	–	9	–	0

== Rankings ==
College Division teams (also referred to as "small college") were ranked in polls by the AP (a panel of writers) and by UPI (coaches). The national champion(s) for each season were determined by the final poll rankings, published at or near the end of the regular season, before any bowl games were played.

=== College Division final polls ===
In 1964, UPI's top ranked team was 9–0 Cal State Los Angeles. 8–0 Wittenberg was top ranked by the AP panel, and second in the UPI poll.

Associated Press (writers) final poll
Published on November 25

Rank	School	Record	No. 1 votes	Total points
1	Wittenberg	8–0	6	114
2	Prairie View A&M	9–0		101
3	Cal State Los Angeles	8–0†	2	97
4	Louisiana Tech	9–1		89
5	San Diego State	8–1†	1	67
6	Concordia (MN)	10–0	1	65
7	UMass	8–1	1	44
8	East Carolina	8–1	1	35
9	Florida A&M	7–1		23
10	Sam Houston State	8–1	1	22

†Denotes team played a game after AP poll, hence record differs in UPI poll

United Press International (coaches) final poll
Published on December 3

Rank	School	Record	No. 1 votes	Total points
1	Cal State Los Angeles	9–0	26	318
2	Wittenberg	8–0	7	278
3	UMass	8–1		217
4	East Carolina	8–1	1	196
T5	Concordia (MN)	10–0	1	152
T5	Louisiana Tech	9–1		152
7	San Diego State	8–2		147
8	Prairie View A&M	9–0		119
9	Sam Houston State	8–1		78
10	North Dakota State	9–1		55

== Bowl games ==
The postseason consisted of four bowl games as regional finals, played on December 12.

Bowl	Region	Location	Winning team		Losing team		Ref
Tangerine	East	Orlando, Florida	East Carolina	14	UMass	13	
Grantland Rice	Mideast	Murfreesboro, Tennessee	Middle Tennessee	20	Muskingum	0	
Pecan	Midwest	Abilene, Texas	State College of Iowa	19	Lamar Tech	17	
Camellia	West	Sacramento, California	Montana State	28	Sacramento State	7	

== See also ==
- 1964 NCAA University Division football season
- 1964 NAIA football season
