= 1964 Tulsa Golden Hurricane football team =

American college football season

1964 Tulsa Golden Hurricane football
- Media guide

Bluebonnet Bowl champion

Bluebonnet Bowl, W 14–7 vs. Ole Miss
- Conference: Missouri Valley Conference

Ranking
- Coaches: No. 18
- Record: 9–2 (3–1 MVC)
- Head coach: Glenn Dobbs (4th season)
- Home stadium: Skelly Stadium

1964 Missouri Valley Conference football standings
	Conf.					Overall
Team	W		L		T	W		L		T
Cincinnati $	4	–	0	–	0	8	–	2	–	0
No. 18 Tulsa	3	–	1	–	0	9	–	2	–	0
Wichita State	2	–	2	–	0	4	–	6	–	0
North Texas State	1	–	3	–	0	2	–	7	–	1
Louisville	0	–	4	–	0	1	–	9	–	0
$ – Conference champion; The games against North Texas State counted twice in the conference standings for Cincinnati and Louisville.; Rankings from Coaches Poll

The 1964 Tulsa Golden Hurricane football team represented the University of Tulsa during the 1964 NCAA University Division football season. In their fourth year under head coach Glenn Dobbs, the Golden Hurricane compiled a 9–2 record, 3–1 against Missouri Valley Conference opponents, led the country in scoring with an average of 36.2 points per game, and defeated Ole Miss, 14–7 in the 1964 Bluebonnet Bowl. Under Glenn Dobbs, Tulsa led the nation in passing for five straight years from 1962 to 1966.

== Schedule ==
Date	Opponent	Site	Result	Attendance	Source
September 26	at Arkansas*	Razorback Stadium; Fayetteville, AR	L 22–31	25,000–35,000	
October 3	Southern Illinois*	Skelly Stadium; Tulsa, OK	W 63–7	12,126–13,626	
October 10	at Houston*	Rice Stadium; Houston, TX	W 31–23	15,000	
October 17	at Louisville	Fairgrounds Stadium; Louisville, KY	W 58–0	11,536	
October 24	at Cincinnati	Nippert Stadium; Cincinnati, OH	L 23–28	16,500	
October 31	Oklahoma State*^{†}	Skelly Stadium; Tulsa, OK (rivalry)	W 61–14	23,731	
November 7	Memphis State*	Skelly Stadium; Tulsa, OK	W 19–7	13,692	
November 14	North Texas State	Skelly Stadium; Tulsa, OK	W 47–0	15,500	
November 21	at Toledo*	Glass Bowl; Toledo, OH	W 39–16	5,282	
November 26	Wichita State	Skelly Stadium; Tulsa, OK	W 21–7	19,750	
December 19	vs. Ole Miss*	Rice Stadium; Houston, TX (Bluebonnet Bowl)	W 14–7	52,500	
*Non-conference game; ^{†}Homecoming; Source:

== Record passing attack ==
The team was led by quarterback Jerry Rhome. Rhome broke 16 NCAA major college records in 1964, including the following:

Single game

- 504 yards of total offense in a game
- 35 pass completions in a game
- 448 passing yards in a game
- 7 touchdown passes in a game

Season

- 3,128 yards of total offense
- 224 pass completions
- 2,870 passing yards
- 32 touchdown passes
- 198 consecutive passes without an interception
- .687 pass completion percentage

Career

- 448 pass completions
- 5,472 passing yards

At the end of the 1964 season, Rhome finished second behind John Huarte in close voting for the Heisman Trophy with Rhome receiving 186 first place votes to 216 for Huarte. He was also selected as a first-team All-American by Football News, the Football Writers Association of America, and the United Press International, and he went on to play seven seasons in the National Football League (NFL).

End Howard Twilley led the NCAA major college players with 95 catches for 1,173 receiving yards and 13 touchdowns. He also ranked second in scoring (110) points, one point behind Brian Piccolo. Twilley went on to a long NFL career with the Miami Dolphins and was inducted in 1992 into the College Football Hall of Fame.

== After the season ==
=== 1965 NFL draft ===
The following Golden Hurricane players were selected in the 1965 NFL draft following the season.

Round	Pick	Player	Position	NFL club
2	21	Bob Breitenstein	Tackle	Washington Redskins
8	107	Jeff Jordan	Defensive back	Minnesota Vikings
14	187	Garry Porterfield	Defensive end	Dallas Cowboys
16	218	Charlie Brown	Tackle	Los Angeles Rams
19	261	Billy Anderson	Quarterback	Los Angeles Rams

=== 1965 AFL draft ===
The following Golden Hurricane players were selected in the 1965 American Football League draft following the season.

Round	Pick	Player	Position	AFL club
5	33	Bob Breitenstein	Tackle	Denver Broncos
9	71	Charley Brown	Tackle	Boston Patriots
11	82	Billy Anderson	Quarterback	Houston Oilers
15	113	Jeff Jordan	Defensive back	Denver Broncos
17	131	Garry Porterfield	Defensive end	Oakland Raiders
