= List of NCAA major college football yearly passing leaders =

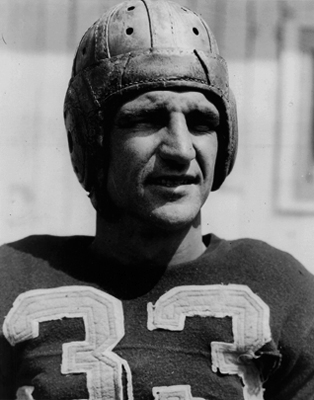
"Slingin" Sammy Baugh

The list of college football yearly passing and total offense leaders identifies the major college passing leaders for each season from 1937 to the present. It includes yearly leaders in three statistical categories: (1) passing yardage; (2) passing touchdowns; and (3) passer rating.

== Overview ==
=== Yardage ===
The NCAA record for passing yards in a single season has been broken eleven times since 1937 when Billy Patterson (Baylor) threw for 1,109 yards that season:

1. Davey O'Brien (TCU) in 1938 with 1,457 yards (Note: Bud Schwenk (Washington University) also threw for the same yards in 1941.)
2. Stan Heath (Nevada) in 1948 with 2,005 yards
3. Don Trull (Baylor) in 1963 with 2,157 yards
4. Jerry Rhome (Tulsa) in 1964 with 2,870 yards
5. Billy Anderson (Tulsa) in 1965 with 3,464 yards
6. Marc Wilson (BYU) in 1979 with 3,720
7. Jim McMahon (BYU) in 1980 with 4,571 yards
8. Andre Ware (Houston) in 1989 with 4,699 yards
9. Ty Detmer (BYU) in 1990 with 5,188 yards
10. B. J. Symons (Texas Tech) in 2003 with 5,833 yards
11. Bailey Zappe (Western Kentucky) in 2021 with 5,967 yards.

Only seven players have led the NCAA in passing yardage in multiple seasons. They are:

1. Brandon Doughty (Western Kentucky) in 2014 and 2015
2. Case Keenum (Houston) in 2009 and 2011
3. Graham Harrell (Texas Tech) in 2007 and 2008
4. Colt Brennan (Hawaii) in 2005 and 2006
5. Tim Rattay (Louisiana Tech) in 1998 and 1999
6. Ty Detmer (BYU) in 1990 and 1991
7. Robbie Bosco (BYU) in 1984 and 1985.

Four programs in the post-1936 "modern-era" have had different players lead major-college football in passing yardage in consecutive seasons.

1. Tulsa Golden Hurricane: Jerry Rhome in 1964 and Billy Anderson in 1965.
2. BYU Cougars: Marc Wilson in 1979 and Jim McMahon in 1980; then Steve Young in 1983 and Robbie Bosco in 1984 and 1985.
3. Texas Tech Red Raiders: Kliff Kingsbury in 2002, B. J. Symons in 2003 and Sonny Cumbie in 2004.
4. Western Kentucky Hilltoppers: Bailey Zappe in 2021 and Austin Reed in 2022.

=== Touchdowns ===
The single-season touchdowns record has been broken nine times since 1938 when Davey O'Brien threw for 19 touchdowns that season.

1. Stan Heath (Nevada) in 1948 with 22
2. Babe Parilli (Kentucky) in 1950 with 23
3. Jerry Rhome (Tulsa) in 1964 with 32
4. Dennis Shaw (San Diego State) in 1969 with 39
5. Jim McMahon (BYU) in 1980 with 47
6. David Klingler (Houston) in 1990 with 54
7. Colt Brennan (Hawaii) in 2006 with 58
8. Joe Burrow (LSU) in 2019 with 60
9. Bailey Zappe (Western Kentucky) in 2021 with 62 passing touchdowns.

Only nine players have led the NCAA in passing touchdowns in multiple seasons. They are:

1. Babe Parilli (Kentucky) in 1950 and 1951
2. Charley Johnson (New Mexico State) in 1959 and 1960
3. Gary Huff (Florida State) in 1971 and 1972
4. Robbie Bosco (BYU) in 1984 and 1985
5. Danny Wuerffel (Florida) in 1995 and 1996
6. Chad Pennington (Marshall) in 1997 and 1999
7. Colt Brennan (Hawaii) in 2005 and 2006
8. Case Keenum (Houston) in 2009 and 2011
9. Brandon Doughty (Western Kentucky) in 2014 and 2015.

=== Passer rating ===
The single-season record for passer rating was broken twice between 1937 and 1952: by Bill Mackrides in 1946 (176.9) and Ron Morris in 1952 (177.4). Morris' record would last for more than 40 years before being broken by Danny Wuerffel in 1995 (178.4), with Shaun King surpassing it three years later (183.3). The record next fell to Russell Wilson (191.8 in 2011). Since then, the record fell in every season from 2016 to 2023. Baker Mayfield broke the record twice, with 196.4 in 2016 and 198.9 in 2017, followed by Tua Tagovailoa (199.5 in 2018), Joe Burrow (202.0 in 2019), Mac Jones (203.1 in 2020), Grayson McCall (207.6 in 2021), and Jayden Daniels (208.0 in 2023).

In addition to Mayfield, the only players to have led in passer rating in multiple seasons are Jerry Tagge in 1970 and 1971, McMahon in 1980 and 1981, Elvis Grbac in 1991 and 1992, and Sam Bradford in 2007 and 2008.

=== Overall ===
The only season in which records were set in all three of the listed categories was 2021, when Zappe set records for yardage and touchdowns, and McCall set the record for passer rating.

== Leading programs ==
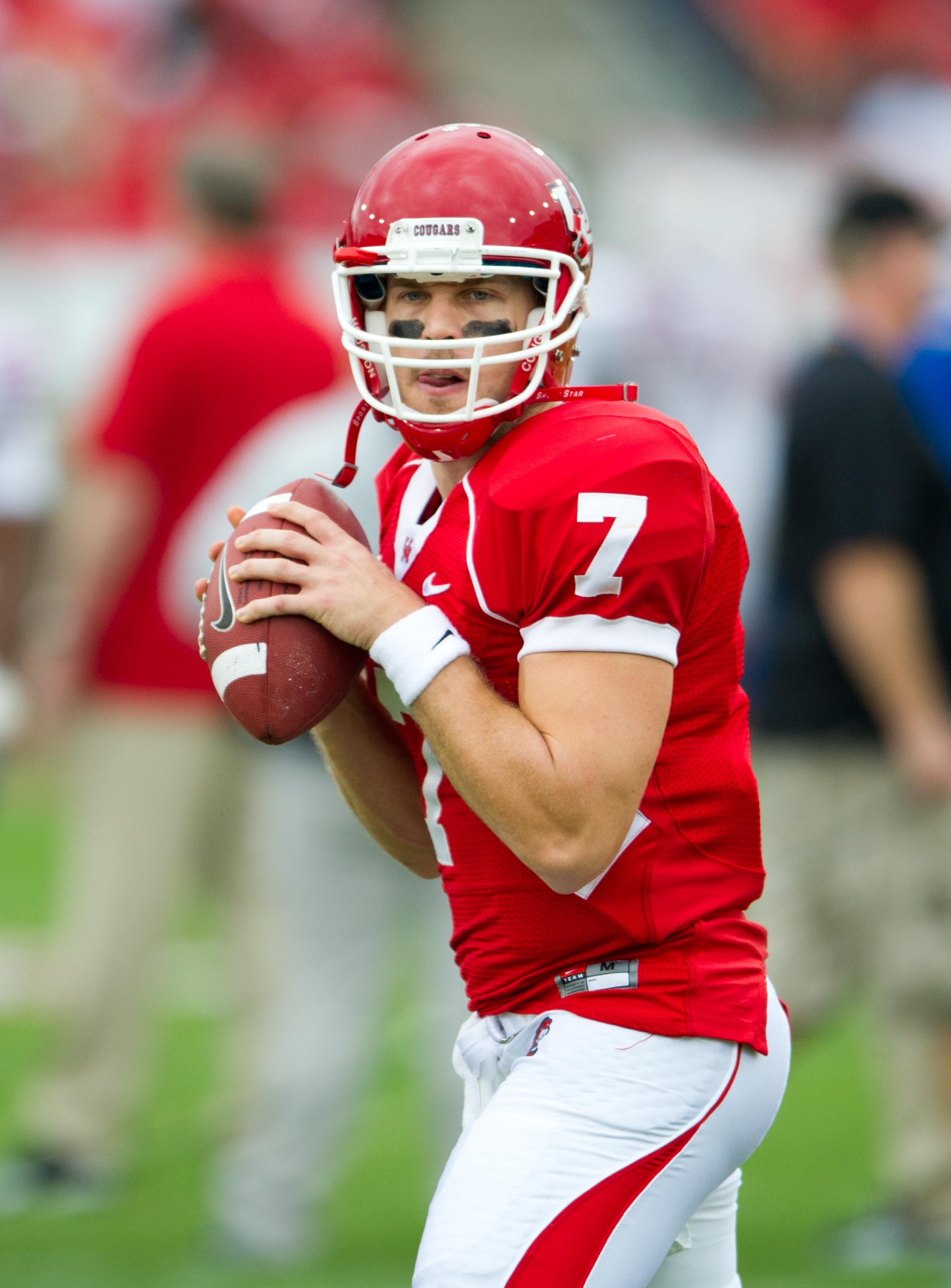
Case Keenum

Programs with multiple passing leaders (in any of the three categories, including ties for the lead) include:

- BYU – 9 (Steve Sarkisian, John Walsh, Ty Detmer, Robbie Bosco, Steve Young, Jim McMahon, Marc Wilson, Gifford Nielsen, Gary Sheide)
- Stanford – 7 (John Elway, Turk Schonert, Steve Dils, Jim Plunkett, Dick Norman, John Brodie, and Bobby Garrett)
- San Diego State – 6 (Todd Santos, Craig Penrose, Craig Kimball, Jesse Freitas, Brian Sipe, Dennis Shaw)
- Florida – 5 (Kyle Trask, Tim Tebow, Rex Grossman, Danny Wuerffel, and Kerwin Bell)
- Houston – 5 (Case Keenum, Jimmy Klingler, David Klingler, Andre Ware, and Bo Burris)
- Texas Tech – 5 (Graham Harrell, Sonny Cumbie, B. J. Symons, Kliff Kingsbury, and Patrick Mahomes)
- Alabama – 4 (Mac Jones, A. J. McCarron, Steve Sloan, Tua Tagovailoa)
- Baylor – 4 (Seth Russell, Nick Florence, Don Trull, and Billy Patterson)
- Fresno State – 4 (Derek Carr, David Carr, Trent Dilfer, and Jeff Tedford)
- Miami – 4 (Steve Walsh, Vinny Testaverde, George Mira, and Cam Ward)
- Nevada – 4 (Mike Maxwell, Chris Vargas, Stan Heath, and Bill Mackrides)
- Arizona – 3 (Eddie Wilson, Fred Enke, Mark Reed)
- Arizona State – 3 (John Jacobs, John Hangartner, Rudy Carpenter)
- Boise State – 3 (Kellen Moore, Ryan Dinwiddie, and Bart Hendricks)
- Florida State – 3 (Jameis Winston, Chris Weinke, and Gary Huff)
- Michigan – 3 (Jim Harbaugh, Elvis Grbac, and Benny Friedman)
- Notre Dame – 3 (Gus Dorais, George Gipp, and John Mohardt)
- Oklahoma – 3 (Claude Arnold, Sam Bradford, and Baker Mayfield)
- Tulsa – 3 (Billy Anderson, Ron Morris, and Jerry Rhome)
- Western Kentucky – 3 (Brandon Doughty, Austin Reed, and Bailey Zappe)
- Purdue - 2 (Len Dawson, Ron DiGravio)
- Boston College – 2 (Jack Concannon, Doug Flutie)
- Hawaii – 2 (Colt Brennan, Bryant Moniz)
- Missouri – 2 (Paul Christman, Drew Lock)
- Ohio State – 2 (Dwayne Haskins, C. J. Stroud)
- Ole Miss - 2 (Charlie Conerly, Jaxson Dart)
- Oregon State – 2 (Terry Baker, Gordon Queen)
- Syracuse - 2 (Don McPherson, Kyle McCord)
- Virginia Tech – 2 (Don Strock, Michael Vick)
- Yale – 2 (Brian Dowling, Dick Winterbauer)

== Passing yards ==
Key
| Symbol | Meaning |
|---|---|
| Leader | The player who recorded the most passing yards in college football. |
| Yds | The total number of passing yards the player had. |
| * | Set the single-season passing yards record. |
| * | Current single-season passing yards record. |
| † | Winner of that year's Heisman Trophy. |
| § | Winner of that year's Davey O'Brien Award. |

College football yearly passing yards leaders
| Season | Leader | Yds | Team | Refs |
|---|---|---|---|---|
| 1937 | Billy Patterson | 1,109* | Baylor | |
| 1938 | Davey O'Brien† | 1,457* | TCU | |
| 1939 | Kay Eakin | 962 | Arkansas | |
| 1940 | Johnny Supulski | 1,190 | Manhattan | |
| 1941 | Bud Schwenk | 1,457* | Washington University (MO) | |
| 1942 | Paul Governali | 1,442 | Columbia | |
| 1943 | Robert Hoernschemeyer | 1,133 | Indiana | |
| 1944 | Paul Rickards | 997 | Pittsburgh | |
| 1945 | Al Dekdebrun | 1,227 | Cornell | |
| 1946 | Bobby Layne | 1,122 | Texas | |
| 1947 | Fred Enke | 1,406 | Arizona | |
| 1948 | Stan Heath | 2,005* | Nevada | |
| 1949 | Tom O'Malley | 1,617 | Cincinnati | |
| 1950 | Don Heinrich | 1,846 | Washington | |
| 1951 | Don Klosterman | 1,843 | Loyola (CA) | |
| 1952 | Zeke Bratkowski | 1,824 | Georgia | |
| 1953 | Bobby Garrett | 1,637 | Stanford | |
| 1954 | Paul Larson | 1,537 | California | |
| 1955 | George Welsh | 1,319 | Navy | |
| 1956 | John Brodie | 1,633 | Stanford | |
| 1957 | Lee Grosscup | 1,398 | Utah | |
| 1958 | Randy Duncan | 1,347 | Iowa | |
| 1959 | Dick Norman | 1,963 | Stanford | |
| 1960 | Norm Snead | 1,676 | Wake Forest | |
| 1961 | Ron Miller | 1,487 | Wisconsin | |
| 1962 | Terry Baker† | 1,738 | Oregon State | |
| 1963 | Don Trull | 2,157* | Baylor | |
| 1964 | Jerry Rhome | 2,870* | Tulsa | |
| 1965 | Billy Anderson | 3,464* | Tulsa | |
| 1966 | Mark Reed | 2,368 | Arizona | |
| 1967 | Sal Olivas | 2,225 | New Mexico State | |
| 1968 | Greg Cook | 3,272 | Cincinnati | |
| 1969 | Dennis Shaw | 3,185 | San Diego State | |
| 1970 | Bob Parker | 2,789 | Air Force | |
| 1971 | Gary Huff | 2,736 | Florida State | |
| 1972 | Don Strock | 3,243 | Virginia Tech | |
| 1973 | Jesse Freitas Jr. | 2,993 | San Diego State | |
| 1974 | Steve Bartkowski | 2,580 | California | |
| 1975 | Craig Penrose | 2,660 | San Diego State | |
| 1976 | Tommy Kramer | 3,317 | Rice | |
| 1977 | Doug Williams | 3,286 | Grambling State | |
| 1978 | Mike Ford | 3,007 | SMU | |
| 1979 | Marc Wilson | 3,720* | BYU | |
| 1980 | Jim McMahon | 4,571* | BYU | |
| 1981 | Sam King | 3,778 | UNLV | |
| 1982 | Todd Dillon | 3,517 | Long Beach State | |
| 1983 | Steve Young§ | 3,902 | BYU | |
| 1984 | Robbie Bosco | 3,875 | BYU | |
| 1985 | Robbie Bosco (2) | 4,273 | BYU | |
| 1986 | Sammy Garza | 3,140 | UTEP | |
| 1987 | Todd Santos | 3,932 | San Diego State | |
| 1988 | Scott Mitchell | 4,322 | Utah | |
| 1989 | Andre Ware† | 4,699* | Houston | |
| 1990 | Ty Detmer† | 5,188 | BYU | |
| 1991 | Ty Detmer§ (2) | 4,031 | BYU | |
| 1992 | Jimmy Klingler | 3,818 | Houston | |
| 1993 | Chris Vargas | 4,265 | Nevada | |
| 1994 | John Walsh | 3,712 | BYU | |
| 1995 | Mike Maxwell | 3,611 | Nevada | |
| 1996 | Josh Wallwork | 4,090 | Wyoming | |
| 1997 | Tim Couch | 3,884 | Kentucky | |
| 1998 | Tim Rattay | 4,943 | Louisiana Tech | |
| 1999 | Tim Rattay (2) | 3,922 | Louisiana Tech | |
| 2000 | Chris Weinke† | 4,167 | Florida State | |
| 2001 | David Carr | 4,839 | Fresno State | |
| 2002 | Kliff Kingsbury | 5,017 | Texas Tech | |
| 2003 | B. J. Symons | 5,833* | Texas Tech | |
| 2004 | Sonny Cumbie | 4,742 | Texas Tech | |
| 2005 | Colt Brennan | 4,301 | Hawaii | |
| 2006 | Colt Brennan (2) | 5,549 | Hawaii | |
| 2007 | Graham Harrell | 5,705 | Texas Tech | |
| 2008 | Graham Harrell (2) | 5,111 | Texas Tech | |
| 2009 | Case Keenum | 5,671 | Houston | |
| 2010 | Bryant Moniz | 5,040 | Hawaii | |
| 2011 | Case Keenum (2) | 5,631 | Houston | |
| 2012 | Nick Florence | 4,309 | Baylor | |
| 2013 | Derek Carr | 5,083 | Fresno State | |
| 2014 | Brandon Doughty | 4,830 | Western Kentucky | |
| 2015 | Brandon Doughty (2) | 5,055 | Western Kentucky | |
| 2016 | Patrick Mahomes II | 5,052 | Texas Tech | |
| 2017 | Mason Rudolph | 4,904 | Oklahoma State | |
| 2018 | Dwayne Haskins | 4,831 | Ohio State | |
| 2019 | Joe Burrow† | 5,671 | LSU | |
| 2020 | Mac Jones§ | 4,500 | Alabama | |
| 2021 | Bailey Zappe | 5,967* | Western Kentucky | |
| 2022 | Austin Reed | 4,746 | Western Kentucky | |
| 2023 | Michael Penix Jr. | 4,904 | Washington | |
| 2024 | Kyle McCord | 4,779 | Syracuse | |
| 2025 | Drew Mestemaker | 4,379 | North Texas | |
| 2026 | | | | |

== Passing touchdowns ==
Key
| Symbol | Meaning |
|---|---|
| Leader | The player who recorded the most passing touchdowns in college football. |
| TDs | The total number of passing touchdowns the player had. |
| * | Set the single-season passing touchdowns record. |
| * | Current single-season passing touchdowns record. |
| † | Winner of that year's Heisman Trophy. |
| § | Winner of that year's Davey O'Brien Award. |

College football yearly passing touchdowns leaders
| Season | Leader | TDs | Team | Refs |
|---|---|---|---|---|
| 1937 | | | | |
| 1938 | Davey O'Brien† | 19* | TCU | |
| 1939 | | | | |
| 1940 | Paul Christman | 13 | Missouri | |
| 1941 | | | | |
| 1942 | | | | |
| 1943 | | | | |
| 1944 | | | | |
| 1945 | | | | |
| 1946 | Bill Mackrides | 17 | Nevada | |
| 1947 | Charlie Conerly | 19 | Ole Miss | |
| 1948 | Stan Heath | 22* | Nevada | |
| 1949 | Buddy Lex | 18 | William & Mary | |
| 1950 | Babe Parilli | 23* | Kentucky | |
| 1951 | Babe Parilli (2) | 19 | Kentucky | |
| 1952 | John Borton | 15 | Ohio State | |
| 1953 | Bobby Garrett | 17 | Stanford | |
| 1954 | Len Dawson | 15 | Purdue | |
| 1955 | | | | |
| 1956 | John Brodie | 12 | Stanford | |
| 1957 | Ken Ford | 14 | Hardin–Simmons | |
| 1957 | John Hangartner | 14 | Arizona State | |
| 1957 | Dick Winterbauer | 14 | Yale | |
| 1958 | Jack Cummings | 11 | North Carolina | |
| 1958 | Randy Duncan | 11 | Iowa | |
| 1958 | Rich Mayo | 11 | Air Force | |
| 1959 | Charley Johnson | 18 | New Mexico State | |
| 1960 | Charley Johnson (2) | 13 | New Mexico State | |
| 1960 | James Earl Wright | 13 | Memphis State | |
| 1961 | Chon Gallegos | 14 | San José State | |
| 1962 | Terry Baker† | 15 | Oregon State | |
| 1962 | Jack Concannon | 15 | Boston College | |
| 1963 | Bob Berry | 16 | Oregon | |
| 1963 | Gordon Queen | 16 | Oregon State | |
| 1964 | Jerry Rhome | 32* | Tulsa | |
| 1965 | Billy Anderson | 30 | Tulsa | |
| 1966 | Bo Burris | 22 | Houston | |
| 1967 | Steve Ramsey | 21 | North Texas State | |
| 1968 | Bill Cappleman | 25 | Florida State | |
| 1968 | Greg Cook | 25 | Cincinnati | |
| 1969 | Dennis Shaw | 39* | San Diego State | |
| 1970 | Brian Sipe | 23 | San Diego State | |
| 1971 | Gary Huff | 23 | Florida State | |
| 1972 | Gary Huff (2) | 25 | Florida State | |
| 1973 | Danny White | 23 | Arizona State | |
| 1974 | Craig Kimball | 23 | San Diego State | |
| 1974 | Gary Sheide | 23 | BYU | |
| 1975 | Steve Myer | 21 | New Mexico | |
| 1976 | Gifford Nielsen | 29 | BYU | |
| 1977 | Doug Williams | 38 | Grambling State | |
| 1978 | Steve Dils | 22 | Stanford | |
| 1979 | Marc Wilson | 29 | BYU | |
| 1980 | Jim McMahon | 47* | BYU | |
| 1981 | Dan Marino | 34 | Pittsburgh | |
| 1982 | John Elway | 24 | Stanford | |
| 1983 | Steve Young§ | 33 | BYU | |
| 1984 | Robbie Bosco | 33 | BYU | |
| 1985 | Robbie Bosco (2) | 30 | BYU | |
| 1986 | Vinny Testaverde† | 26 | Miami (FL) | |
| 1987 | Todd Santos | 26 | San Diego State | |
| 1988 | Scott Mitchell | 29 | Utah | |
| 1988 | Steve Walsh | 29 | Miami (FL) | |
| 1989 | Andre Ware† | 46 | Houston | |
| 1990 | David Klingler | 54* | Houston | |
| 1991 | Troy Kopp | 37 | Pacific | |
| 1992 | Jimmy Klingler | 32 | Houston | |
| 1993 | Chris Vargas | 34 | Nevada | |
| 1994 | Mike Maxwell | 29 | Nevada | |
| 1994 | John Walsh | 29 | BYU | |
| 1995 | Danny Wuerffel§ | 35 | Florida | |
| 1996 | Danny Wuerffel† (2) | 39 | Florida | |
| 1997 | Chad Pennington | 39 | Marshall | |
| 1998 | Tim Rattay | 46 | Louisiana Tech | |
| 1999 | Chad Pennington (2) | 37 | Marshall | |
| 2000 | Bart Hendricks | 35 | Boise State | |
| 2001 | David Carr | 42 | Fresno State | |
| 2002 | Kliff Kingsbury | 45 | Texas Tech | |
| 2003 | B. J. Symons | 52 | Texas Tech | |
| 2004 | Omar Jacobs | 41 | Bowling Green | |
| 2005 | Colt Brennan | 35 | Hawaii | |
| 2006 | Colt Brennan (2) | 58* | Hawaii | |
| 2007 | Graham Harrell | 48 | Texas Tech | |
| 2008 | Sam Bradford† | 50 | Oklahoma | |
| 2009 | Case Keenum | 44 | Houston | |
| 2010 | Bryant Moniz | 39 | Hawaii | |
| 2011 | Case Keenum (2) | 48 | Houston | |
| 2012 | Geno Smith | 42 | West Virginia | |
| 2013 | Derek Carr | 50 | Fresno State | |
| 2014 | Brandon Doughty | 49 | Western Kentucky | |
| 2015 | Brandon Doughty (2) | 48 | Western Kentucky | |
| 2016 | Logan Woodside | 45 | Toledo | |
| 2017 | Drew Lock | 44 | Missouri | |
| 2018 | Dwayne Haskins | 50 | Ohio State | |
| 2019 | Joe Burrow† | 60* | LSU | |
| 2020 | Kyle Trask | 43 | Florida | |
| 2021 | Bailey Zappe | 62* | Western Kentucky | |
| 2022 | Caleb Williams† | 42 | USC | |
| 2023 | Bo Nix | 45 | Oregon | |
| 2024 | Cam Ward§ | 39 | Miami (FL) | |
| 2025 | Fernando Mendoza† | 41 | Indiana | |
| 2026 | | | | |

== Passer rating ==
Key
| Symbol | Meaning |
|---|---|
| Leader | The player who recorded the highest passer rating in college football. |
| Rate | The total passer rating the player had. |
| * | Set the single-season passer rating record. |
| * | Current single-season passer rating record. |
| † | Winner of that year's Heisman Trophy. |
| § | Winner of that year's Davey O'Brien Award. |

College football yearly passer rating leaders
| Season | Leader | Rate | Team | Refs |
|---|---|---|---|---|
| 1937 | | | | |
| 1938 | | | | |
| 1939 | | | | |
| 1940 | | | | |
| 1941 | | | | |
| 1942 | | | | |
| 1943 | | | | |
| 1944 | | | | |
| 1945 | | | | |
| 1946 | Bill Mackrides | 176.9* | Nevada | |
| 1947 | Bobby Layne | 138.9 | Texas | |
| 1948 | Stan Heath | 157.2 | Nevada | |
| 1949 | Bob Williams | 159.1 | Notre Dame | |
| 1950 | Claude Arnold | 157.3 | Oklahoma | |
| 1951 | Dick Kazmaier† | 155.3 | Princeton | |
| 1952 | Ron Morris | 177.4* | Tulsa | |
| 1953 | Bobby Garrett | 142.2 | Stanford | |
| 1954 | Pete Vann | 166.5 | Army | |
| 1955 | George Welsh | 146.1 | Navy | |
| 1956 | Tom Flores | 147.5 | Pacific | |
| 1957 | Lee Grosscup | 175.5 | Utah | |
| 1958 | John Hangartner | 150.1 | Arizona State | |
| 1959 | Charley Johnson | 135.7 | New Mexico State | |
| 1960 | Eddie Wilson | 140.8 | Arizona | |
| 1961 | Ron DiGravio | 140.1 | Purdue | |
| 1962 | John Jacobs | 153.9 | Arizona State | |
| 1963 | Bob Berry | 164.0 | Oregon | |
| 1964 | Jerry Rhome | 172.6 | Tulsa | |
| 1965 | Steve Sloan | 153.8 | Alabama | |
| 1966 | Dewey Warren | 142.2 | Tennessee | |
| 1967 | Bill Andrejko | 140.6 | Villanova | |
| 1968 | Brian Dowling | 165.8 | Yale | |
| 1969 | Dennis Shaw | 162.2 | San Diego State | |
| 1970 | Jerry Tagge | 149.0 | Nebraska | |
| 1971 | Jerry Tagge (2) | 150.9 | Nebraska | |
| 1972 | John Hufnagel | 148.0 | Penn State | |
| 1973 | Danny White | 157.4 | Arizona State | |
| 1974 | Steve Joachim | 150.1 | Temple | |
| 1975 | Jim Kubacki | 147.6 | Harvard | |
| 1976 | Steve Haynes | 146.9 | Louisiana Tech | |
| 1977 | Dave Wilson | 164.2 | Ball State | |
| 1978 | Paul McDonald | 152.8 | USC | |
| 1979 | Turk Schonert | 163.0 | Stanford | |
| 1980 | Jim McMahon | 176.9 | BYU | |
| 1981 | Jim McMahon§ (2) | 155.0 | BYU | |
| 1982 | Tom Ramsey | 153.5 | UCLA | |
| 1983 | Steve Young§ | 168.5 | BYU | |
| 1984 | Doug Flutie§ | 152.9 | Boston College | |
| 1985 | Jim Harbaugh | 163.7 | Michigan | |
| 1986 | Vinny Testaverde† | 165.8 | Miami (FL) | |
| 1987 | Don McPherson§ | 164.3 | Syracuse | |
| 1988 | Timm Rosenbach | 162.0 | Washington State | |
| 1989 | Ty Detmer | 175.6 | BYU | |
| 1990 | Shawn Moore | 160.7 | Virginia | |
| 1991 | Elvis Grbac | 169.0 | Michigan | |
| 1992 | Elvis Grbac (2) | 154.2 | Michigan | |
| 1993 | Trent Dilfer | 173.1 | Fresno State | |
| 1994 | Kerry Collins§ | 172.9 | Penn State | |
| 1995 | Danny Wuerffel§ | 178.4* | Florida | |
| 1996 | Steve Sarkisian | 173.6 | BYU | |
| 1997 | Cade McNown | 168.6 | UCLA | |
| 1998 | Shaun King | 183.3* | Tulane | |
| 1999 | Michael Vick | 180.4 | Virginia Tech | |
| 2000 | Bart Hendricks | 170.6 | Boise State | |
| 2001 | Rex Grossman | 170.8 | Florida | |
| 2002 | Brad Banks§ | 157.1 | Iowa | |
| 2003 | Philip Rivers | 170.5 | NC State | |
| 2004 | Stefan LeFors | 181.7 | Louisville | |
| 2005 | Rudy Carpenter | 175.0 | Arizona State | |
| 2006 | Colt Brennan | 186.0* | Hawaii | |
| 2007 | Sam Bradford | 176.5 | Oklahoma | |
| 2008 | Sam Bradford† (2) | 180.8 | Oklahoma | |
| 2009 | Tim Tebow | 164.2 | Florida | |
| 2010 | Kellen Moore | 182.6 | Boise State | |
| 2011 | Russell Wilson | 191.8* | Wisconsin | |
| 2012 | A. J. McCarron | 175.3 | Alabama | |
| 2013 | Jameis Winston† | 184.4 | Florida State | |
| 2014 | Marcus Mariota† | 181.7 | Oregon | |
| 2015 | Seth Russell | 189.7 | Baylor | |
| 2016 | Baker Mayfield | 196.4* | Oklahoma | |
| 2017 | Baker Mayfield† (2) | 198.9* | Oklahoma | |
| 2018 | Tua Tagovailoa | 199.5* | Alabama | |
| 2019 | Joe Burrow† | 202.0* | LSU | |
| 2020 | Mac Jones§ | 203.1* | Alabama | |
| 2021 | Grayson McCall | 207.6* | Coastal Carolina | |
| 2022 | C. J. Stroud | 177.7 | Ohio State | |
| 2023 | Jayden Daniels† | 208.0* | LSU | |
| 2024 | Jaxson Dart | 180.7 | Ole Miss | |
| 2025 | Fernando Mendoza† | 182.9 | Indiana | |
| 2026 | | | | |

== Pre-1937 unofficial data ==
Before 1937 the NCAA did not compile official statistics. This chart reflects unofficial passing statistics compiled by historians mostly from newspapers accounts. No available data for missing years.

College football yearly passing yards leaders
| Season | Leader | Yds | Team | Refs |
|---|---|---|---|---|
| 1936 | Sammy Baugh | 1,261 | TCU | |
| 1935 | Sammy Baugh | 1,241 | TCU | |
| 1933 | Doug Nott | 1,092 | Detroit | |
| 1928 | Lloyd Brazil | 997 | Detroit | |
| 1927 | Bill Spears | 1,207 | Vanderbilt | |
| 1926 | Benny Friedman | 526 | Michigan | |
| 1925 | Benny Friedman | 760 | Michigan | |
| 1921 | John Mohardt | 995 | Notre Dame | |
| 1920 | George Gipp | 709 | Notre Dame | |
| 1919 | George Gipp | 727 | Notre Dame | |
| 1913 | Gus Dorais | 510 | Notre Dame | |

College football yearly passing touchdowns leaders
| Season | Leader | TDs | Team | Refs |
|---|---|---|---|---|
| 1935 | Sammy Baugh | 18 | TCU | |
| 1930 | Ray Forsberg | 11 | Utah | |
| 1927 | Bill Spears | 9 | Vanderbilt | |
| 1926 | Benny Friedman | 9 | Michigan | |
| 1925 | Andy Oberlander | 14 | Dartmouth | |
| 1921 | John Mohardt | 9 | Notre Dame | |
| 1919 | Ira Rodgers | 11 | West Virginia | |
