= Jim Greth =

Former American football wide receiver

- Greth in 1966

Profile
- Position: End

Personal information
- Born: April 11, 1944 (age 82); Covina, California, U.S.
- Listed height: 6 ft 2 in (1.88 m)
- Listed weight: 196 lb (89 kg)

Career information
- College: Air Force (1962–1964): Arizona (1966)

Career history
- Toronto Argonauts (1967); Montreal Alouettes (1967–1968)

James William Greth (born April 11, 1944) is a former American football end. He played college football for Air Force from 1962 to 1964 and Arizona in 1966. He set Arizona school records in 1966 with 76 receptions (second nationally) and 1,003 receiving yards (fourth nationally). He also played professional football with the Toronto Argonauts and Montreal Alouettes in 1967 and 1968.

== Early life ==
Greth was born in Covina, California, in 1944. He grew up in La Habra, California, and attended La Habra High School where he played halfback, wingback, and defensive back for the football team in 1960 and 1961. He also played for the baseball team as an outfielder and basketball team as a guard at La Habra.

== College football ==
Greth played college football as an end for the Air Force Falcons from 1962 to 1964. During the 1964 season, he caught 33 passes for 436 yards.

In March 1965, seven cadets, including Greth, from the Air Force Academy, all football players, resigned from the Academy in the wake of a cheating scandal. All seven, including Greth, signed letters of intent to enroll at the University of Arizona. In 1966, Arizona compiled a 3–7 record, but Greth and quarterback Mark Reed set 13 new school records. Greth set single-game records with 76 receptions (second nationally) and 1,003 receiving yards (fourth nationally), and tied the school record with eight receiving touchdowns (seventh nationally).

== Professional football ==
Greth played professional football in the Canadian Football League (CFL) for the Toronto Argonauts and for the Montreal Alouettes in 1967. He had 12 receptions for 144 yards and 59 rushing yards on 12 carries in the CFL. At the end of the 1966 season, Greth was picked to play in the Blue–Gray Football Classic.
