= 1964 Marshall Thundering Herd football team =

American college football season

1964 Marshall Thundering Herd football
- Conference: Mid-American Conference
- Record: 7–3 (4–2 MAC)
- Head coach: Charlie Snyder (6th season)
- Captains: Bill Winter; Jim Cure
- Home stadium: Fairfield Stadium

1964 Mid-American Conference football standings
	Conf.					Overall
Team	W		L		T	W		L		T
Bowling Green $	5	–	1	–	0	9	–	1	–	0
Marshall	4	–	2	–	0	7	–	3	–	0
Miami (OH)	4	–	2	–	0	6	–	3	–	1
Ohio	3	–	2	–	1	5	–	4	–	1
Western Michigan	2	–	4	–	0	3	–	6	–	0
Kent State	1	–	4	–	1	3	–	5	–	1
Toledo	1	–	5	–	0	2	–	8	–	0
$ – Conference champion

The 1964 Marshall Thundering Herd football team was an American football team that represented Marshall University in the Mid-American Conference (MAC) during the 1964 NCAA University Division football season. In its sixth season under head coach Charlie Snyder, the team compiled a 7–3 record (4–2 against conference opponents), tied for second place out of seven teams in the MAC, and outscored opponents by a total of 120 to 93. Bill Winter and Jim Cure were the team captains. The team played its home games at Fairfield Stadium in Huntington, West Virginia.

== Schedule ==
Date	Opponent	Site	Result	Attendance	Source
September 19	vs. Morehead State*	Putnam Stadium; Ashland, KY	L 0–6	8,000	
September 26	Miami (OH)	Fairfield Stadium; Huntington, WV	L 0–21	8,000	
October 3	at Toledo	Glass Bowl; Toledo, OH	W 13–0	8,432	
October 10	Buffalo*	Fairfield Stadium; Huntington, WV	W 14–12	7,500	
October 17	Kentucky State*	Fairfield Stadium; Huntington, WV	W 27–6	8,000	
October 24	Louisville^{†}*	Fairfield Stadium; Huntington, WV	W 28–6	9,000	
October 31	Western Michigan	Fairfield Stadium; Huntington, WV	W 16–7	6,500	
November 6	at Bowling Green	University Stadium; Bowling Green, OH	L 0–28	12,914	
November 14	Kent State	Fairfield Stadium; Huntington, WV	W 12–7	6,000	
November 21	at Ohio	Peden Stadium; Athens, OH (rivalry)	W 10–0	12,000	
*Non-conference game; ^{†}Homecoming; Source:
