= Steve Joachim =

American gridiron football player (born 1952)

No. 11
- Position: Quarterback

Personal information
- Born: March 27, 1952 (age 74); Newtown Square, Pennsylvania, U.S.
- Listed height: 6 ft 3 in (1.91 m)
- Listed weight: 215 lb (98 kg)

Career information
- High school: Haverford (Havertown, Pennsylvania)
- College: Penn State (1971–1972); Temple (1973–1974)
- NFL draft: 1975: 7th round, 160th overall pick

Career history
- Toronto Argonauts (1975); New York Jets (1976)

Awards and highlights
- Maxwell Award (1974); First-team All-American (1974); First-team All-East (1974); Temple Football Hall of Fame

Career NFL statistics
- Games played: 1
- Stats at Pro Football Reference

William Steven Joachim (/dʒoʊˈɑːkɪm/ joh-AHK-ihm; born March 27, 1952) is an American former professional football player who was a quarterback in the National Football League (NFL) for the New York Jets, and in the Canadian Football League (CFL) with the Toronto Argonauts. He played college football for the Penn State Nittany Lions before transferring to the Temple Owls, where he led the nation in total offense and won the Maxwell Award in 1974. He was selected by the Baltimore Colts in the seventh round of the 1975 NFL draft.

== Early life ==
He grew up in Havertown, Pennsylvania, and played high school football at Haverford High School.

== After football ==
He entered the world of Pennsylvania politics in 1982, running as a Republican for Pennsylvania's Seventh Congressional District seat. He lost by 10 points to Democrat Bob Edgar.

== See also ==
- List of NCAA major college football yearly passing leaders
- List of NCAA major college football yearly total offense leaders
