= Robbie Bosco =

American football player (born 1963)

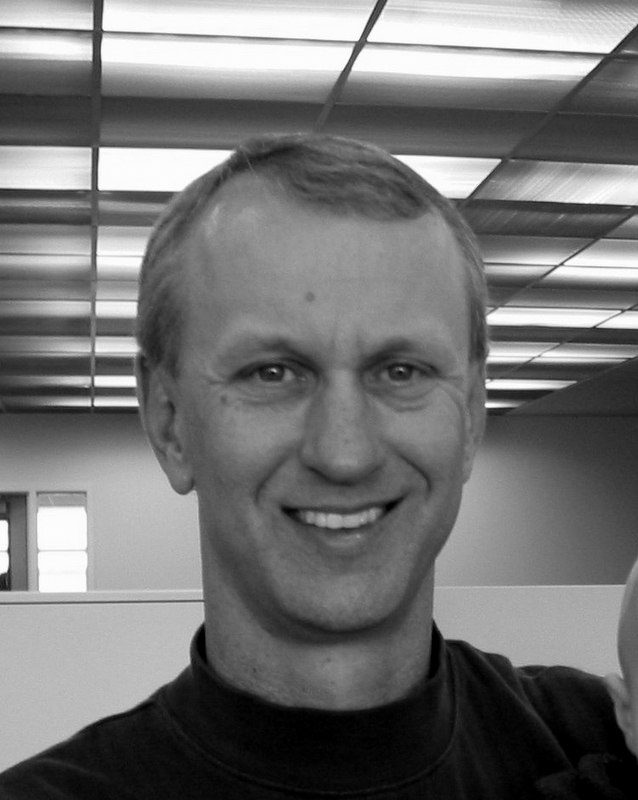
- Bosco during an open house at BYU's new football facility in 2004

No. 16
- Position: Quarterback

Personal information
- Born: January 11, 1963 (age 63); Roseville, California, U.S.
- Listed height: 6 ft 2 in (1.88 m)
- Listed weight: 188 lb (85 kg)

Career information
- High school: Roseville
- College: BYU (1981–1985)
- NFL draft: 1986: 3rd round, 72nd overall pick

Career history

Playing
- Green Bay Packers (1986–1987)

Coaching
- Idaho State (1988) Quarterbacks coach; BYU (1989) Graduate assistant; BYU (1990–2003) Quarterbacks coach

Awards and highlights
- National champion (1984); Sammy Baugh Trophy (1984); Third-team All-American (1984); 2× NCAA passing yards leader (1984–1985); WAC Offensive Player of the Year (1984); First-team All-WAC (1984); Second-team All-WAC (1985); BYU Cougars No. 6 retired

Robbie Bosco (born January 11, 1963) is an American former professional football quarterback who played in the National Football League (NFL) for two seasons with the Green Bay Packers. He played college football for the BYU Cougars and led the team to the 1984 National Championship.

== College career ==
In 1984, Bosco took over as starting quarterback at Brigham Young University after Steve Young graduated. In his first season as a starter, Bosco guided the Cougars to a perfect 13–0 record. BYU finished the season by defeating Michigan, 24–17, in the Holiday Bowl, clinching the school's first and only national championship. Despite injuries to his knee, ankle, and rib, he led the Cougars back from a 17–10 fourth quarter deficit. His 13-yard touchdown pass to Kelly Smith with 1:23 left in the game secured the victory.

Bosco completed 283 of 458 passes for 3,875 yards and 33 touchdowns during the 1984 regular season. He led the nation in passing yardage, and finished second, behind Doug Flutie of Boston College, in pass efficiency. He finished third in the voting for the Heisman Trophy.

In Bosco's senior season (1985), BYU finished with an 11–3 record. He completed 338 of 511 passes for 4,273 yards (the second-highest total in BYU history at the time, behind Jim McMahon's 4,571 yards in 1980), throwing 30 touchdown passes that year. Against New Mexico, Bosco set a school single-game record by passing for 585 yards. He finished his BYU career with 10 NCAA records, and was third in voting for the 1985 Heisman Trophy.

Bosco received a BA in communications and he received a master's degree in exercise science, both from BYU, and has worked in various coaching and administrative positions at BYU since 1989.

=== College statistics ===
Year	Team	Passing								Rushing			
Year	Team	Cmp	Att	Pct	Yds	Y/A	TD	Int	Rtg	Att	Yds	Avg	TD
1983	BYU	17	28	60.7%	252	9.0	3	1	164.5	10	-26	-2.6	0
1984	BYU	283	458	61.8	3,875	8.5	33	11	151.8	85	57	0.7	2
1985	BYU	338	511	66.1	4,273	8.4	30	24	146.4	67	-132	-2.0	2
Career		638	997	64.0%	8,400	8.4	66	36	149.4	162	-101	-0.6	4

== Professional career ==
Bosco was drafted 72nd overall in the third round of the 1986 NFL draft by the Green Bay Packers, where he played for two years until a shoulder injury ended his career.

== Coaching career ==
One week after he was cut by the Packers, Bosco was named quarterbacks coach at Idaho State. He returned to BYU in 1989 as a graduate assistant and helped develop quarterback Ty Detmer. He became a full-time offensive assistant in 1990. He was the Cougars' quarterbacks coach until he was reassigned to a fundraising position at the end of the 2003 season.

== Personal life ==
Bosco and his wife Karen have six children: Amber, Karissa, Alexis, Dallin, Wesley, and Collin.

On January 30, 2026, The Church of Jesus Christ of Latter-day Saints announced that Bosco had been called along with his wife to serve as President of the Church's Ohio Columbus Mission, effective July 1.

== See also ==
- List of NCAA major college football yearly passing leaders
- List of NCAA major college football yearly total offense leaders
