= Mike Ford (quarterback) =

American football player (born 1959)

Profile
- Position: Quarterback

Personal information
- Born: January 30, 1959 (age 67); Clarksville, Texas, U.S.
- Listed height: 6 ft 3 in (1.91 m)
- Listed weight: 220 lb (100 kg)

Career information
- High school: Mesquite (Mesquite, Texas)
- College: SMU (1977–1980)
- NFL draft: 1981: 9th round, 228th overall pick

Career history
- San Antonio Gunslingers (1984)

Awards and highlights
- Second-team All-SWC (1978); NCAA passing yards leader (1978); NCAA total offense leader (1978)

Michael Carlton Ford (born January 30, 1959) is an American former professional football player who was a quarterback for the San Antonio Gunslingers of the United States Football League (USFL). He attended Mesquite High School in Mesquite, Texas. Ford played college football for the SMU Mustangs from 1977 to 1980. As a sophomore in 1978, he led all NCAA major college players in both total offense yards (2,957), total offense per game (268.8 yards/game), and passing yards (3,007). In 11 games during the 1978 season, he completed 224 of 389 passes for 3,007 passing yards, 17 touchdowns, and 23 interceptions for and SMU team that compiled a 4–6–1 record. Listed as a pre-season Heisman Trophy candidate in 1979, he never reached the same statistical levels, passing for 217 yards after sustaining a knee injury in 1979 season opener, and tallying 951 passing yards in 1980. He returned to SMU as a student 30 year later to obtain his degree.

After his college career, he played in the USFL for the San Antonio Gunslingers.

== See also ==
- List of NCAA major college football yearly passing leaders
- List of NCAA major college football yearly total offense leaders
