= Sal Olivas =

American football player

Profile
- Position: Quarterback

Personal information
- Born: March 31, 1946 (age 80); El Paso, Texas, U.S.

Career information
- High school: Cathedral (El Paso)
- College: New Mexico State (1964–1967)

Awards and highlights
- NCAA passing yards leader (1967); NCAA total offense leader (1967)

Sal Olivas (March 31, 1946) is an American former football player. He played college football for the New Mexico State Aggies and led the NCAA in both passing yards and total offense during the 1967 season. He also played professional football for the San Antonio Toros of the Continental Football League from 1969 to 1971.

== Early life ==
Olivas was born in 1946 in El Paso, Texas. He attended Cathedral High School in that city.

== New Mexico State ==
Olivas played college football for the New Mexico State Aggies football team from 1964 to 1967. He passed for 594 yards in an injury-shortened sophomore season in 1965 and 1,154 yards in 1966.

As a senior in 1967, he led all NCAA major college players in both total with 2,190 yards of total offense and 2,225 passing yards. He ranked second in pass attempts (321) and passing touchdowns (19) and third in pass completions (155). Olivas was inducted into the New Mexico State Athletics Hall of Fame in 1970.

== Professional football ==
Olivas played professional football for the El Paso Jets of the Texas Football League (TFL) in 1968, and after the TFL folded, with the San Antonio Toros of the Continental Football League from 1969 to 1971. He passed for 1,098 yards in 1969, 1,0008 yards in 1970, and 959 yards in 1971. Olivas played for the New Mexico Thunderbirds of the Southwestern Professional Football League in 1973, and he then played for the El Paso Matadors of the Mid America Football League in 1974.

== Later life ==
As of 1979, Olivas was a salesman for an El Paso sporting goods firm. As of 2013, he was the Internet and inventory manager for a car dealership (Casa Nissan) in El Paso.

== See also ==
- List of NCAA major college football yearly passing leaders
- List of NCAA major college football yearly total offense leaders
