= Dick Norman (American football) =

American football player (born 1938)

No. 12
- Position: Quarterback

Personal information
- Born: September 14, 1938 (age 88); Downey, California, U.S.
- Listed height: 6 ft 3 in (1.91 m)
- Listed weight: 209 lb (95 kg)

Career information
- High school: Lynwood (Lynwood, California)
- College: Stanford
- NFL draft: 1960: 5th round, 57th overall pick
- AFL draft: 1961: 5th round, 37th overall pick

Career history
- Chicago Bears (1961); San Francisco 49ers (1963)*
- * Offseason or practice squad member only

Awards and highlights
- Sammy Baugh Trophy (1959); NCAA passing yards leader (1959); Second-team All-PCC (1959)
- Stats at Pro Football Reference

Richard Michael Norman (born September 14, 1938) is a Stanford Athletics Hall of Fame inductee and former quarterback for the Chicago Bears of the National Football League (NFL).

== College career ==
Norman played high school football at Lynwood High School in Lynwood, California and attended Stanford University, where he was Stanford's starting quarterback from 1958 to 1960.

Norman's tenure came at a low point in Stanford football history: the 1959 team went 3–7 and the 1960 squad was 0–10. In spite of the team's overall record, however, Norman put up incredible passing numbers in 1959, leading the nation with 1,963 yards and 2,018 yards of total offense, more than 300 yards ahead of the closest contender, and winning the first-ever Sammy Baugh Trophy, awarded to the nation's top passer. In a losing effort in the 1959 Big Game against Cal, Norman threw for 401 yards, then an NCAA record, and still a Big Game record. Norman's 1960 season was less impressive, but he still threw for more than 1,000 yards.

Norman starred in the 1961 Senior Bowl, throwing for 311 yards and leading a late touchdown drive to put the North team on top before the South's Norm Snead led his own last-minute drive to win the game. Norman was nonetheless named the game's MVP and his 311 passing yards remains the fourth-highest in Senior Bowl history.

Norman was inducted into the Stanford Athletics Hall of Fame in 2017.

== NFL career ==
Norman was drafted by the Chicago Bears in the fifth round of the 1960 NFL draft and by the Oakland Raiders in the fifth round of the 1961 AFL draft. Norman opted to play with the NFL Bears, but saw action in just three games. He remained with the Bears through the 1962 season, and then was traded to the San Francisco 49ers for the 1963 season. The 49ers waived him before the season started, ending his NFL career.

== After football ==
Norman currently lives in Montana with his wife Joyce.

== See also ==
- List of NCAA major college football yearly passing leaders
- List of NCAA major college football yearly total offense leaders
