= 1964 North Texas State Eagles football team =

American college football season

1964 North Texas State Eagles football
- Conference: Missouri Valley Conference
- Record: 2–7–1 (1–3 MVC)
- Head coach: Odus Mitchell (19th season)
- Home stadium: Fouts Field

1964 Missouri Valley Conference football standings
	Conf.					Overall
Team	W		L		T	W		L		T
Cincinnati $	4	–	0	–	0	8	–	2	–	0
No. 18 Tulsa	3	–	1	–	0	9	–	2	–	0
Wichita State	2	–	2	–	0	4	–	6	–	0
North Texas State	1	–	3	–	0	2	–	7	–	1
Louisville	0	–	4	–	0	1	–	9	–	0
$ – Conference champion; The games against North Texas State counted twice in the conference standings for Cincinnati and Louisville.; Rankings from Coaches Poll

The 1964 North Texas State Eagles football team was an American football team that represented North Texas State University (now known as the University of North Texas) during the 1964 NCAA University Division football season as a member of the Missouri Valley Conference. In their 19th year under head coach Odus Mitchell, the team compiled a 2–7–1 record.

== Schedule ==
Date	Opponent	Site	Result	Attendance	Source
September 19	Texas Western*	Fouts Field; Denton, TX	T 0–0	6,500	
September 26	Bowling Green*	Fouts Field; Denton, TX	L 7–21	6,000	
October 3	at Louisville	Fairgrounds Stadium; Louisville, KY	W 22–0	10,928	
October 10	West Texas State*	Fouts Field; Denton, TX	L 13–21	5,000–6,000	
October 17	New Mexico State*	Fouts Field; Denton, TX	L 7–13	4,000	
October 24	at San Diego Marines*	San Diego, CA	L 3–16		
October 31	at Southern Illinois*	McAndrew Stadium; Carbondale, IL	W 14–13	14,000	
November 7	Cincinnati^{†}	Fouts Field; Denton, TX	L 6–27	15,000	
November 14	at Tulsa	Skelly Stadium; Tulsa, OK	L 0–47	15,500	
November 21	at Wichita State	Veterans Field; Wichita, KS	L 6–14	5,050	
*Non-conference game; ^{†}Homecoming
