= 1964 Western Michigan Broncos football team =

American college football season

1964 Western Michigan Broncos football
- Conference: Mid-American Conference
- Record: 3–6 (2–4 MAC)
- Head coach: Bill Doolittle (1st season)
- MVP: Jim Reid
- Captains: Troy Allen; Paul Rakow; Tom Titcomb
- Home stadium: Waldo Stadium

1964 Mid-American Conference football standings
	Conf.					Overall
Team	W		L		T	W		L		T
Bowling Green $	5	–	1	–	0	9	–	1	–	0
Marshall	4	–	2	–	0	7	–	3	–	0
Miami (OH)	4	–	2	–	0	6	–	3	–	1
Ohio	3	–	2	–	1	5	–	4	–	1
Western Michigan	2	–	4	–	0	3	–	6	–	0
Kent State	1	–	4	–	1	3	–	5	–	1
Toledo	1	–	5	–	0	2	–	8	–	0
$ – Conference champion

The 1964 Western Michigan Broncos football team represented Western Michigan University in the Mid-American Conference (MAC) during the 1964 NCAA University Division football season. In their first season under head coach Bill Doolittle, the Broncos compiled a 3–6 record (2–4 against MAC opponents), finished in fifth place in the MAC, and were outscored by their opponents, 185 to 77. The team played its home games at Waldo Stadium in Kalamazoo, Michigan.

The team's statistical leaders included Bob Radlinski with 469 passing yards, Troy Allen with 185 rushing yards, and Allen Howze with 94 receiving yards. Quarterback Troy Allen, tackle Paul Rakow, and end Tom Titcomb were the team captains. Center Jim Reid received the team's most outstanding player award.

Bill Doolittle was hired as Western's head football coach on January 20, 1964. He had played quarterback at Ohio State from 1946 to 1948 and was the backfield coach at Army during the 1962 and 1963 seasons.

== Schedule ==
Date	Opponent	Site	Result	Attendance	Source
September 19	at Louisville*	Fairgrounds Stadium; Louisville, KY	W 10–7	9,084	
September 26	Central Michigan*	Waldo Stadium; Kalamazoo, MI (rivalry)	L 6–18	13,000	
October 3	at Miami (OH)	Miami Field; Oxford, OH	L 0–35	11,759	
October 10	Bowling Green	Waldo Stadium; Kalamazoo, MI	L 8–28	11,600	
October 17	at Kent State	Memorial Stadium; Kent, OH	W 12–9	12,000	
October 24	Toledo	Waldo Stadium; Kalamazoo, MI	L 13–21	17,000	
October 31	at Marshall	Fairfield Stadium; Huntington, WV	L 7–16	6,500	
November 7	Ohio	Waldo Stadium; Kalamazoo, MI	W 13–8	12,000	
November 14	at BYU*	Cougar Stadium; Provo, UT	L 8–43	6,863	
*Non-conference game; Source:
