= Bud Schwenk =

American football player (1917–1980)

- Schwenk in 1946

No. 45, 64, 84, 40, 88
- Positions: Quarterback, Halfback

Personal information
- Born: August 26, 1917; St. Louis, Missouri, U.S.
- Died: October 1, 1980 (aged 63); St. Louis, Missouri, U.S.
- Listed height: 6 ft 2 in (1.88 m)
- Listed weight: 201 lb (91 kg)

Career information
- High school: Beaumont (St. Louis)
- College: Washington (MO)
- NFL draft: 1942: 3rd round, 19th overall pick

Career history
- Chicago Cardinals (1942); Cleveland Browns (1946); Baltimore Colts (1947); New York Yankees (1948)

Awards and highlights
- AAFC champion (1946); NCAA passing yards leader (1941); Washington University No. 42 retired

Career NFL/AAFC statistics
- Passing attempts: 662
- Passing completions: 315
- Completion percentage: 47.6%
- TD–INT: 23–50
- Passing yards: 3,924
- Passer rating: 46.5
- Rushing yards: 376
- Rushing touchdowns: 4
- Stats at Pro Football Reference

Wilson Rutherford "Bud" Schwenk Jr. (August 26, 1917– October 1, 1980) was an American professional football player who was a quarterback for four seasons in the National Football League (NFL) and All-America Football Conference (AAFC).

Schwenk was a college football star with the Washington University Bears, for whom he was a single wing halfback, setting numerous passing records in his senior year. After college, Schwenk played one season for the Chicago Cardinals in the NFL, before leaving to serve for three years as a PT boat captain in the United States Navy during World War II.

Upon his discharge, Schwenk signed a contract for the 1946 season with the Cleveland Browns of the new AAFC. Although Schwenk was hobbled by injury, the Browns won the AAFC championship that year. Schwenk was traded after the 1946 season, landing with the expansion Baltimore Colts, for whom he was the team's first starting quarterback. The 1947 season was his best year as a player, with Schwenk setting a professional football record for passing attempts. Waived by the Colts, Schwenk was picked up by the New York Yankees for 1948, his final season in football.

Schwenk was inducted into the Washington University sports hall of fame in 1991. His jersey number 42 is the only one retired by the school's football program.

== Biography ==
=== High school and college career ===
Schwenk was a native of St. Louis, Missouri and attended the city's Beaumont High School. A three-sport athlete, he became a star halfback who both threw forward passes and ran with the ball at Washington University in St. Louis. He played for the Washington University Bears football team, starting as a junior in 1940. He set a college football record the following year by running and passing for a combined 516 yards in a single game. He surpassed a three-year-old college record for completed passes in a season later in the year, with 114. He passed and ran for a total of 1,628 yards.

=== Professional career ===
Schwenk was recruited by professional football teams and was drafted by the Chicago Cardinals of the National Football League at the end of 1941. That December, he said he had abandoned plans to play in the National Football League because of World War II. Nevertheless, he played for the Cardinals during the 1942 season. He broke the NFL record for most passes completed in his first season, although the Philadelphia Eagles' Davey O'Brien also broke the record and beat him with 146.

Schwenk did not play between 1943 and 1945 as he served as the captain of a PT boat in the U.S. Navy during the war.

Following his discharge from the Navy, Schwenk signed with the Cleveland Browns of the new All-America Football Conference. Limited by an ankle injury, Schwenk played sparingly for the Browns in the 1946 season, substituting on occasion for quarterback Otto Graham. The Browns won the AAFC championship that year. Schwenk was traded to the Buffalo Bills for fullback Jim Thibaut early in 1947. The Bills then sent him to the Baltimore Colts in August.

Schwenk started at quarterback in the first regular season game in Baltimore Colts franchise history. As a Colt in 1947, Schwenk had what would be the best season of his career, passing for 2,236 yards and throwing 13 touchdowns.

In November, Schwenk bested his own professional football record, set while with the Cardinals in 1942, of 295 passing attempts in a season. Despite his production, the Colts put him out on waivers after the season, however. He was picked up by the New York Yankees. Schwenk played for the Yankees in 1948 before leaving professional football.

=== Later life, death, and legacy ===
Schwenk began work in 1950 as the chief operating officer of the Mississippi Valley branch of Junior Achievement, a non-profit that prepares young people for the workforce. He stayed at Junior Achievement for 30 years. He engaged in civic organizations in St. Louis, and was on the board of the city's Better Business Bureau. He also was a director and founder of the Spanish Lake Bank & Trust Company. Between 1971 and 1975, he was chairman of the Missouri State Athletic Commission.

Schwenk died on October 1, 1980, of lung cancer. He was 63 years old at the time of his death.

Schwenk was inducted into the Washington University Sports Hall of Fame in 1991, and his number 42 jersey is the only one retired by the Washington Bears.

== See also ==
- List of NCAA major college football yearly passing leaders
- List of NCAA major college football yearly total offense leaders
