= 1964 Cincinnati Bearcats football team =

American college football season

1964 Cincinnati Bearcats football

MVC champion
- Conference: Missouri Valley Conference
- Record: 8–2 (4–0 MVC)
- Head coach: Chuck Studley (4th season)
- Captains: Brig Owens; Jerry Momper
- Home stadium: Nippert Stadium

1964 Missouri Valley Conference football standings
	Conf.					Overall
Team	W		L		T	W		L		T
Cincinnati $	4	–	0	–	0	8	–	2	–	0
No. 18 Tulsa	3	–	1	–	0	9	–	2	–	0
Wichita State	2	–	2	–	0	4	–	6	–	0
North Texas State	1	–	3	–	0	2	–	7	–	1
Louisville	0	–	4	–	0	1	–	9	–	0
$ – Conference champion; The games against North Texas State counted twice in the conference standings for Cincinnati and Louisville.; Rankings from Coaches Poll

The 1964 Cincinnati Bearcats football team represented the University of Cincinnati in the Missouri Valley Conference (MVC) during the 1964 NCAA University Division football season. In their fourth season under head coach Chuck Studley, the Bearcats compiled an overall record of 8–2 record with mark of 4–0 in conference, won the MVC championship, and outscored opponents 211 to 99.

The team tallied tallied 242.2 yards per game of rushing offense and 79.7 yards per game of passing offense. On defense, they held opponents to 134.0 yards per game rushing and 557 yards per game passing. Key players included:

- Quarterback and team captain Brig Owens, nicknamed "The Brig O" (an homage to the school's basketball star Oscar Robertson who was known as "The Big O"), was a triple-threat man and the school's first African-american starter at quarterback. During the 1964 season, he completed 54 or 111 passes (48.6%) for 790 yards and six touchdowns. He also tallied 658 rushing yard, and handled place-kicking.
- Halfback Al Nelson led the team in both rushing (973 rushing yards on 201 attempts, 4.8 yards per carry) and scoring (78 points on 13 rushing touchdowns). He also caught 13 passes for 133 yards and broke Cincinnati's single-season rushing record of 959 yards that had been set by Roger Stephens in 1947.
- End Errol Prisby led the team with 367 receiving yards and six touchdowns on 12 receptions. Prisby also tallied 292 rushing yars on 45 carries (6.5 yards per carry).

== Schedule ==
Date	Opponent	Site	Result	Attendance	Source
September 26	Dayton*	Nippert Stadium; Cincinnati, OH	W 20–10	23,000	
October 2	at Detroit*	University of Detroit Stadium; Detroit, MI	W 19–0	16,539	
October 10	Xavier*	Nippert Stadium; Cincinnati, OH	W 35–6	25,000	
October 17	at Boston College*	Alumni Stadium; Chestnut Hill, MA	L 10–0	15,000–17,700	
October 24	Tulsa	Nippert Stadium; Cincinnati, OH	W 28–23	16,500	
October 31	George Washington*	Nippert Stadium; Cincinnati, OH	L 17–15	20,000	
November 7	at North Texas State (Note: The game against North Texas State counted twice in the MVC standings for Cincinnati.)	Fouts Field; Denton, TX	W 27–6	15,000	
November 14	at Wichita State	Veterans Field; Wichita, KS	W 19–7	9,278	
November 21	Miami (OH)*	Nippert Stadium; Cincinnati, OH (rivalry)	W 28–14	17,000	
November 28	at Houston*	Rice Stadium; Houston, TX	W 20–6	10,000	
*Non-conference game

== Players ==
- Bill Bailey, back
- Dolph Banks, back
- Ted Coppola, back
- Dick Fugere, lineman
- Jim Hoose
- Jerry Momper, center
- Al Nelson
- Brig Owens, quarterback
- Erroll Prisby, back
- Bob Steinhauser, back
- Jim Swanda, lineman
- Bob Taylor, lineman
