= 1964 Ohio Bobcats football team =

American college football season

1964 Ohio Bobcats football
- Conference: Mid-American Conference
- Record: 5–4–1 (3–2–1 MAC)
- Head coach: Bill Hess (7th season)
- Home stadium: Peden Stadium

1964 Mid-American Conference football standings
	Conf.					Overall
Team	W		L		T	W		L		T
Bowling Green $	5	–	1	–	0	9	–	1	–	0
Marshall	4	–	2	–	0	7	–	3	–	0
Miami (OH)	4	–	2	–	0	6	–	3	–	1
Ohio	3	–	2	–	1	5	–	4	–	1
Western Michigan	2	–	4	–	0	3	–	6	–	0
Kent State	1	–	4	–	1	3	–	5	–	1
Toledo	1	–	5	–	0	2	–	8	–	0
$ – Conference champion

The 1964 Ohio Bobcats football team was an American football team that represented Ohio University in the Mid-American Conference (MAC) during the 1964 NCAA University Division football season. In their seventh season under head coach Bill Hess, the Bobcats compiled a 5–4–1 record (3–2–1 against MAC opponents), finished in fourth place in the MAC, and outscored all opponents by a combined total of 122 to 99. They played their home games in Peden Stadium in Athens, Ohio.

The team's statistical leaders included Wash Lyons with 835 rushing yards, Larry Bainter with 443 passing yards, and Jim Dorna with 162 receiving yards. Defensive tackle John Frick was a second-team All-America pick by the Associated Press (AP), and linebacker Skip Hoovler was an honorable mention All-America by the AP and United Press International.

== Schedule ==
Date	Opponent	Site	Result	Attendance	Source
September 19	at West Texas State*	Buffalo Bowl; Canyon, TX	W 16–14		
September 26	at Purdue*	Ross–Ade Stadium; West Lafayette, IN	L 0–17	45,321	
October 3	at Kent State	Memorial Stadium; Kent, OH	T 3–3	13,000	
October 10	Toledo	Peden Stadium; Athens, OH	W 21–12	13,800	
October 17	Xavier*	Peden Stadium; Athens, OH	L 19–23	11,000	
October 24	Miami (OH)	Peden Stadium; Athens, OH (rivalry)	W 10–7	18,000	
October 31	Dayton*	Peden Stadium; Athens, OH	W 24–0	12,200	
November 7	at Western Michigan	Waldo Stadium; Kalamazoo, MI	L 8–13	12,000	
November 14	at Bowling Green	Doyt Perry Stadium; Bowling Green, OH	W 21–0	14,610	
November 21	Marshall	Peden Stadium; Athens, OH (rivalry)	L 0–10	12,000	
*Non-conference game; Source:
