= Mickey Heath =

American baseball player (1903–1986)

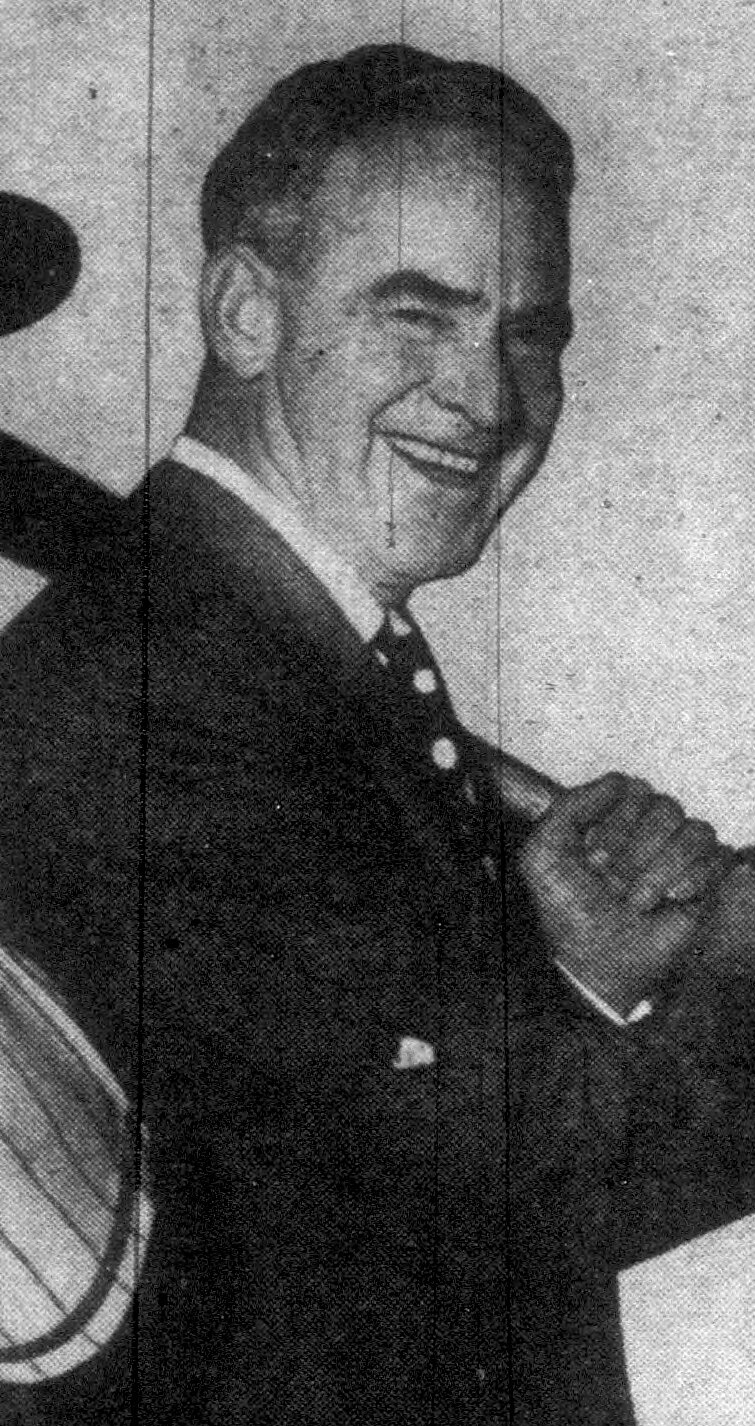
- Heath, circa 1953
- First baseman
- Born: October 30, 1903; Toledo, Ohio
- Died: July 30, 1986 (aged 82); Dallas, Texas
- Batted: Left Threw: Left

MLB debut
- April 18, 1931, for the Cincinnati Reds

Last MLB appearance
- June 5, 1932, for the Cincinnati Reds

MLB statistics
- Batting average: .213
- Home runs: 0
- Runs batted in: 18
- Stats at Baseball Reference

Teams
- Cincinnati Reds (1931–1932)

Minor Wilson "Mickey" Heath (October 30, 1903 – July 30, 1986) was a professional baseball player. He was a first baseman over parts of two seasons (1931–32) with the Cincinnati Reds. For his career, he compiled a .213 batting average in 160 at-bats, with 18 runs batted in. In addition, in 17 minor league seasons, Heath hit 287 home runs.

He was born in Toledo, Ohio and died in Dallas, Texas at the age of 82. Heath was the father of NFL player Stan Heath.
