= 1964 Wichita State Shockers football team =

American college football season

1964 Wichita State Shockers football
- Conference: Missouri Valley Conference
- Record: 4–6 (2–2 MVC)
- Head coach: Marcelino Huerta (3rd season)
- Home stadium: Veterans Field

1964 Missouri Valley Conference football standings
	Conf.					Overall
Team	W		L		T	W		L		T
Cincinnati $	4	–	0	–	0	8	–	2	–	0
No. 18 Tulsa	3	–	1	–	0	9	–	2	–	0
Wichita State	2	–	2	–	0	4	–	6	–	0
North Texas State	1	–	3	–	0	2	–	7	–	1
Louisville	0	–	4	–	0	1	–	9	–	0
$ – Conference champion; The games against North Texas State counted twice in the conference standings for Cincinnati and Louisville.; Rankings from Coaches Poll

The 1964 Wichita State Shockers football team was an American football team that represented Wichita State University as a member of the Missouri Valley Conference during the 1964 NCAA University Division football season. In its third and final season under head coach Marcelino Huerta, the team compiled a 4–6 record (2–2 against conference opponents), finished third out of five teams in the MVC, and was outscored by a total of 197 to 112. The team played its home games at Veterans Field, now known as Cessna Stadium.

== Schedule ==
Date	Opponent	Site	Result	Attendance	Source
September 19	Montana State*	Veterans Field; Wichita, KS	W 21–6	12,500–12,567	
October 3	at Arizona State*	Sun Devil Stadium; Tempe, AZ	L 18–24	34,984	
October 10	at Utah State*	Romney Stadium; Logan, UT	L 7–51	10,299	
October 17	Detroit*	Veterans Field; Wichita, KS	W 8–7	10,960	
October 24	at No. 4 Arkansas*	War Memorial Stadium; Little Rock, AR	L 0–17	38,000–39,000	
October 31	Louisville	Veterans Field; Wichita, KS	W 23–15	8,310	
November 7	at Oklahoma State*	Lewis Field; Stillwater, OK	L 7–31	19,000	
November 14	Cincinnati	Veterans Field; Wichita, KS	L 7–19	9,278	
November 21	North Texas State	Veteran Field; Wichita, KS	W 14–6	5,050	
November 26	at Tulsa	Skelly Stadium; Tulsa, OK	L 7–21	19,750	
*Non-conference game; Rankings from AP Poll released prior to the game; Source:
