= Paul Larson (American football) =

American football player (1932–2022)

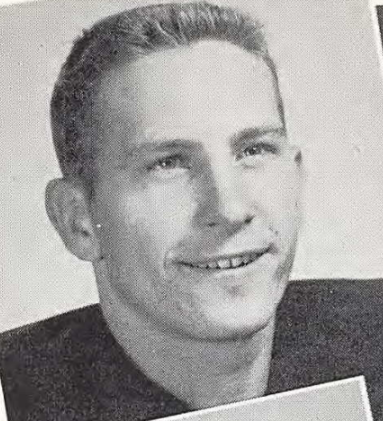
- Larson from 1954 Blue and Gold

No. 12
- Position: Quarterback

Personal information
- Born: March 19, 1932; Turlock, California, U.S.
- Died: October 29, 2022 (aged 90); Turlock, California, U.S.
- Listed height: 5 ft 11 in (1.80 m)
- Listed weight: 185 lb (84 kg)

Career information
- High school: Turlock
- College: California (1951–1954)
- NFL draft: 1954: 8th round, 86th overall pick

Career history
- Chicago Cardinals (1954–1957); Oakland Raiders (1960)

Awards and highlights
- First-team All-American (1954); NCAA passing yards leader (1954); Voit Trophy (1954); 2× First-team All-PCC (1953, 1954)

Career NFL/AFL statistics
- Passing attempts: 14
- Passing completions: 6
- Completion percentage: 42.9%
- TD–INT: 0–1
- Passing yards: 61
- Passer rating: 26.2
- Stats at Pro Football Reference

Paul Leroy Larson (March 19, 1932 – October 29, 2022) was an American football player. A native of Turlock, California, Larson played college football at the quarterback position for the California Golden Bears football team. He was selected by the Football Writers Association of America as the first-team quarterback on its 1954 College Football All-America Team. He was selected by the Chicago Cardinals in the eighth round (86th overall pick) of the 1954 NFL draft and played for the Cardinals in five games during the 1957 NFL season. He later appeared in one game for the Oakland Raiders in 1960.

Larson died in Turlock on October 29, 2022, at the age of 90.

== See also ==
- List of NCAA major college football yearly passing leaders
- List of NCAA major college football yearly total offense leaders
