= Johnny Supulski =

American football quarterback

Profile
- Position: Halfback

Personal information
- Born: c. 1917; Kingston, Pennsylvania, U.S.
- Died: June 7, 1985; Plains Township, Pennsylvania, U.S.

Career information
- College: Manhattan College

Awards and highlights
- NCAA passing yards leader (1940)

John J. Supulski (1917 - June 7, 1985), sometimes referred to as "John-John", was an American football player. He played college football for the Manhattan Jaspers football team and led the NCAA in passing yardage in 1940.

== Early life ==
Supulki was born and raised in Kingston, Pennsylvania. His father Joseph (Cibulski) Supulski Sr. was an immigrant from Lithuania.

Sibulski graduated from Edwardsville High School in Edwardsville, Pennsylvania, and LaSalle Military Academy in Oakdale, New York.

== Manhattan Jaspers ==
Supulski played college football for the Manhattan College Jaspers from 1938 to 1940. Playing at left halfback, he led the NCAA in passing yardage in 1940 with 1,190 yards. Notable games included:

- On September 28, 1940, Supulski led Manhattan to a 45–0 victory over St. Bonaventure, completing 8 of 13 passes for 162 yards and four touchdowns. He also scored on a one-yard run. The Brooklyn Eagle wrote that "a star was unearthed for Manhattan in the person of Johnny Supulski."
- On October 11, 1940, Supulski led Manhattan to a 20-6 victory over Boston University. Supulski completed seven of nine passes for 121 yards and three touchdowns in what the New York Daily News called an "aerial circus".
- On November 9, 1940, in a 45–41 victory over Marquette at Yankee Stadium, Supulski threw touchdown passes covering 12 and 63 yards. He set up another touchdown on a drive in which he completed seven consecutive passes. In the fourth quarter, he set up another touchdown with a 51-yard pass to the one-yard line. Supulski also kicked to extra-point kicks.
- On November 16, 1940, in a loss to Villanova, Supulski completed 12 of 20 passes for 143 yards, but he also threw six interceptions.
- On November 23, 1940, in his final college game, Supulski completed 15 of 25 passes for 226 yards and accounted for all four Manhattan touchdowns on a one-yard plunge and three fourth-quarter touchdown passes.

Supulski also played on defense and was described as "the bulwark of the Jaspers' defense."

== Professional football ==
Supulski signed with the New York Giants of the NFL in July 1941, but he was released the following month. He played for the Electric Boat Diesels football team in 1942.

== Later life and family ==
Supulski's brother, Len Supulski, played professional football as an end and died in a plane crash during World War II.

Supulski was married to Justyna Ezanitski; they had a daughter and a son. He worked for the Wyoming Seminary.

Supulski died in 1985 at age 68 at a nursing center in Plains Township, Pennsylvania.

== See also ==
- List of college football yearly passing leaders
