= 1964 Toledo Rockets football team =

American college football season

1964 Toledo Rockets football
- Conference: Mid-American Conference
- Record: 2–8 (1–5 MAC)
- Head coach: Frank Lauterbur (2nd season)
- Home stadium: Glass Bowl

1964 Mid-American Conference football standings
	Conf.					Overall
Team	W		L		T	W		L		T
Bowling Green $	5	–	1	–	0	9	–	1	–	0
Marshall	4	–	2	–	0	7	–	3	–	0
Miami (OH)	4	–	2	–	0	6	–	3	–	1
Ohio	3	–	2	–	1	5	–	4	–	1
Western Michigan	2	–	4	–	0	3	–	6	–	0
Kent State	1	–	4	–	1	3	–	5	–	1
Toledo	1	–	5	–	0	2	–	8	–	0
$ – Conference champion

The 1964 Toledo Rockets football team was an American football team that represented Toledo University in the Mid-American Conference (MAC) during the 1964 NCAA University Division football season. In their second season under head coach Frank Lauterbur, the Rockets compiled a 2–8 record (1–5 against MAC opponents), finished in seventh place in the MAC, and were outscored by all opponents by a combined total of 218 to 127.

Dan Simrell set single-season school records in passing yards (1,239), completions (115) and total offense (1,616). (Note: Broke the previous total offense mark of 1,201 set by Lee Pete in 1947.) Other team statistical leaders were Jim Berkey with 408 rushing yards, and Henry Burch with 412 receiving yards.

== Schedule ==
Date	Opponent	Site	Result	Attendance	Source
September 19	Villanova*	Glass Bowl; Toledo, OH	L 6–22	11,752	
September 25	at Detroit*	University of Detroit Stadium; Detroit, MI	L 6–22	10,181	
October 3	Marshall	Glass Bowl; Toledo, OH	L 0–13	8,432	
October 10	at Ohio	Peden Stadium; Athens, OH	L 12–21	13,800	
October 17	Bowling Green	Glass Bowl; Toledo, OH (rivalry)	L 14–31	13,330	
October 24	at Western Michigan	Waldo Stadium; Kalamazoo, MI	W 21–13	17,000	
October 31	at Kent State	Memorial Stadium; Kent, OH	L 11–14	9,000	
November 7	Miami (OH)	Glass Bowl; Toledo, OH	L 14–35	8,821	
November 14	at Southern Illinois*	McAndrew Stadium; Carbondale, IL	W 27–8	8,000–8,500	
November 21	Tulsa*	Glass Bowl; Toledo, OH	L 16–39	5,282	
*Non-conference game; Source:

== After the season ==
=== NFL draft ===
The following Rockets were selected in the 1965 NFL draft following the season.

Round	Pick	Player	Position	NFL club
14	195	Dan Simrell	Quarterback	Cleveland Browns
16	216	Jim Gray	Back	Philadelphia Eagles
