= 1964 Bowling Green Falcons football team =

American college football season

1964 Bowling Green Falcons football

MAC champion
- Conference: Mid-American Conference
- Record: 9–1 (5–1 MAC)
- Head coach: Doyt Perry (10th season)
- Home stadium: University Stadium

1964 Mid-American Conference football standings
	Conf.					Overall
Team	W		L		T	W		L		T
Bowling Green $	5	–	1	–	0	9	–	1	–	0
Marshall	4	–	2	–	0	7	–	3	–	0
Miami (OH)	4	–	2	–	0	6	–	3	–	1
Ohio	3	–	2	–	1	5	–	4	–	1
Western Michigan	2	–	4	–	0	3	–	6	–	0
Kent State	1	–	4	–	1	3	–	5	–	1
Toledo	1	–	5	–	0	2	–	8	–	0
$ – Conference champion

The 1964 Bowling Green Falcons football team was an American football team that represented Bowling Green State University in the Mid-American Conference (MAC) during the 1964 NCAA University Division football season. In their tenth and final season under head coach Doyt Perry, the Falcons compiled a 9–1 record (5–1 against MAC opponents), won the MAC championship, and outscored opponents by a combined total of 275 to 87.

The team's statistical leaders included Jerry Ward with 726 passing yards, Stew Williams with 609 rushing yards, and Jay Cunningham with 174 receiving yards.

Doyt Perry resigned as the team's head football coach after the 1965 season but remained the school's athletic director until 1970. He was inducted into the College Football Hall of Fame in 1988.

== Schedule ==
Date	Opponent	Site	Result	Attendance	Source
September 19	Southern Illinois*	University Stadium; Bowling Green, OH	W 35–12	8,921–9,000	
September 26	at North Texas State	Fouts Field; Denton, TX	W 21–7	6,000	
October 3	Dayton*	University Stadium; Bowling Green, OH	W 35–0	13,409	
October 10	at Western Michigan	Waldo Stadium; Kalamazoo, MI	W 28–8	11,600	
October 17	at Toledo	Glass Bowl; Toledo, OH (rivalry)	W 31–14	13,330	
October 24	Kent State	University Stadium; Bowling Green, OH (rivalry)	W 41–0	14,563	
October 31	at Miami (OH)	Miami Field; Oxford, OH	W 21–18	16,922	
November 7	Marshall	University Stadium; Bowling Green, OH	W 28–0	12,914	
November 14	Ohio	University Stadium; Bowling Green, OH	L 0–21	14,610	
November 21	at Xavier*	Xavier Stadium; Cincinnati, OH	W 35–7		
*Non-conference game; Source:
