= 1964 Miami Redskins football team =

American college football season

1964 Miami Redskins football
- Conference: Mid-American Conference
- Record: 6–3–1 (4–2 MAC)
- Head coach: Bo Schembechler (2nd season)
- MVP: Ernie Kellermann
- Captains: Ernie Kellermann; Mike Cohen; Bill Williams
- Home stadium: Miami Field

1964 Mid-American Conference football standings
	Conf.					Overall
Team	W		L		T	W		L		T
Bowling Green $	5	–	1	–	0	9	–	1	–	0
Marshall	4	–	2	–	0	7	–	3	–	0
Miami (OH)	4	–	2	–	0	6	–	3	–	1
Ohio	3	–	2	–	1	5	–	4	–	1
Western Michigan	2	–	4	–	0	3	–	6	–	0
Kent State	1	–	4	–	1	3	–	5	–	1
Toledo	1	–	5	–	0	2	–	8	–	0
$ – Conference champion

The 1964 Miami Redskins football team was an American football team that represented Miami University in the Mid-American Conference (MAC) during the 1964 NCAA University Division football season. In their second season under Schembechler, the Redskins compiled a 6–3–1 record (4–2 against MAC opponents), finished in a tie for second place in the MAC, and outscored all opponents by a combined total of 210 to 142. On October 17, 1964, in what is regarded as one of the great victories in Miami football history, Miami defeated Northwestern, by a 28 to 27 score.

The team's statistical leaders included quarterback Ernie Kellermann with 1,260 passing yards, Don Peddie with 691 rushing yards, and John Erisman with 392 receiving yards. Kellerman was selected as the team's most valuable player and was also a first-team All-MAC selection. Kellerman, Mike Cohen, and Bill Williams were the team captains.

== Schedule ==
Date	Opponent	Site	Result	Attendance	Source
September 19	at Xavier*	Xavier Stadium; Cincinnati, OH	T 7–7	14,165	
September 26	at Marshall	Fairfield Stadium; Huntington, WV	W 21–0	8,000	
October 3	Western Michigan	Miami Field; Oxford, OH	W 35–0	11,759	
October 10	at Kent State	Memorial Stadium; Kent, OH	W 17–14	8,231	
October 17	at Northwestern*	Dyche Stadium; Evanston, IL	W 28–27	41,147	
October 24	at Ohio	Peden Stadium; Athens, OH (rivalry)	L 7–10	18,000	
October 31	Bowling Green	Miami Field; Oxford, OH	L 18–21	16,922	
November 7	at Toledo	Glass Bowl; Toledo, OH	W 35–14	8,821	
November 14	Dayton*	Miami Field; Oxford, OH	W 28–21	14,051	
November 21	at Cincinnati*	Nippert Stadium; Cincinnati, OH (rivalry)	L 14–28	17,000	
*Non-conference game; Source:
