= 1964 Louisville Cardinals football team =

American college football season

1964 Louisville Cardinals football
- Conference: Missouri Valley Conference
- Record: 1–9 (0–4 MVC)
- Head coach: Frank Camp (19th season)
- Home stadium: Fairgrounds Stadium

1964 Missouri Valley Conference football standings
	Conf.					Overall
Team	W		L		T	W		L		T
Cincinnati $	4	–	0	–	0	8	–	2	–	0
No. 18 Tulsa	3	–	1	–	0	9	–	2	–	0
Wichita State	2	–	2	–	0	4	–	6	–	0
North Texas State	1	–	3	–	0	2	–	7	–	1
Louisville	0	–	4	–	0	1	–	9	–	0
$ – Conference champion; The games against North Texas State counted twice in the conference standings for Cincinnati and Louisville.; Rankings from Coaches Poll

The 1964 Louisville Cardinals football team was an American football team that represented the University of Louisville in the Missouri Valley Conference (MVC) during the 1964 NCAA University Division football season. In their 19th season under head coach Frank Camp, the Cardinals compiled an overall record of 1–9 record with a mark of 0–4 in conference play, placing last out of five teams in the MVC, and were outscored by opponents 217 to 70.

The team's statistical leaders included Tom LaFramboise with 1,380 passing yards, Ron Hall with 301 rushing yards, and Al MacFarlane with 446 receiving yards and 26 points scored.

== Schedule ==
Date	Opponent	Site	Result	Attendance	Source
September 19	Western Michigan*	Fairgrounds Stadium; Louisville, KY	L 7–10	9,084	
September 26	at Southern Illinois*	McAndrew Stadium; Carbondale, IL	L 6–7	11,000–12,500	
October 3	North Texas State (Note: The game against North Texas State counted twice in the MVC standings for Louisville.)	Fairgrounds Stadium; Louisville, KY	L 0–22	10,928	
October 10	at Dayton*	Baujan Field; Dayton, OH	W 21–7	11,750	
October 17	Tulsa	Fairgrounds Stadium; Louisville, KY	L 0–58	11,536	
October 24	at Marshall*	Fairfield Stadium; Huntington, WV	L 6–28	9,000	
October 31	at Wichita State	Veterans Stadium; Wichita, KS	L 15–23	8,310	
November 7	Kent State*	Fairgrounds Stadium; Louisville, KY	L 7–14	5,675	
November 14	at Memphis State*	Crump Stadium; Memphis, TN (rivalry)	L 0–34	11,698	
November 21	Drake*	Fairgrounds Stadium; Louisville, KY	L 8–14	1,997	
*Non-conference game; Source:
