= 1964 Kent State Golden Flashes football team =

American college football season

1964 Kent State Golden Flashes football
- Conference: Mid-American Conference
- Record: 3–5–1 (1–4–1 MAC)
- Head coach: Leo Strang (1st season)
- Home stadium: Memorial Stadium

1964 Mid-American Conference football standings
	Conf.					Overall
Team	W		L		T	W		L		T
Bowling Green $	5	–	1	–	0	9	–	1	–	0
Marshall	4	–	2	–	0	7	–	3	–	0
Miami (OH)	4	–	2	–	0	6	–	3	–	1
Ohio	3	–	2	–	1	5	–	4	–	1
Western Michigan	2	–	4	–	0	3	–	6	–	0
Kent State	1	–	4	–	1	3	–	5	–	1
Toledo	1	–	5	–	0	2	–	8	–	0
$ – Conference champion

The 1964 Kent State Golden Flashes football team was an American football team that represented Kent State University in the Mid-American Conference (MAC) during the 1964 NCAA University Division football season. In their first season under head coach Leo Strang, the Golden Flashes compiled a 3–5–1 record (1–4–1 against MAC opponents), finished in sixth place in the MAC, and were outscored by all opponents by a combined total of 121 to 87.

The team's statistical leaders included Tom Clements with 444 rushing yards, Ron Mollric with 384 passing yards, and Fred Gissendaner with 258 receiving yards. Offensive guard Booker Collins and halfback Pat Gucciardo were selected as first-team All-MAC players. Kent led the nation in pass defense, percentage attendance increase, and PAT completion percentage.

Strang was hired as Kent State's head football coach in January 1964. He head previously been the football coach at Massillon Washington High School in Massillon, Ohio.

== Schedule ==
Date	Opponent	Site	Result	Attendance	Source
September 26	Xavier*	Memorial Stadium; Kent, OH	W 15–2	11,000–12,000	
October 3	Ohio	Memorial Stadium; Kent, OH	T 3–3	13,000	
October 10	at Miami (OH)	Miami Field; Oxford, OH	L 14–17	8,231	
October 17	Western Michigan	Memorial Stadium; Kent, OH	L 9–12	12,000	
October 24	at Bowling Green	University Stadium; Bowling Green, OH (rivalry)	L 0–41	14,563	
October 31	Toledo	Memorial Stadium; Kent, OH	W 14–11	9,000	
November 7	at Louisville*	Fairgrounds Stadium; Louisville, KY	W 14–7	5,675	
November 14	at Marshall	Fairfield Stadium; Huntington, WV	L 7–12	6,000	
November 21	at Dayton*	Baujan Field; Dayton, OH	L 11–16	3,500	
*Non-conference game; Source:
