= Stan Heath (gridiron football) =

American football player (1927–2010)

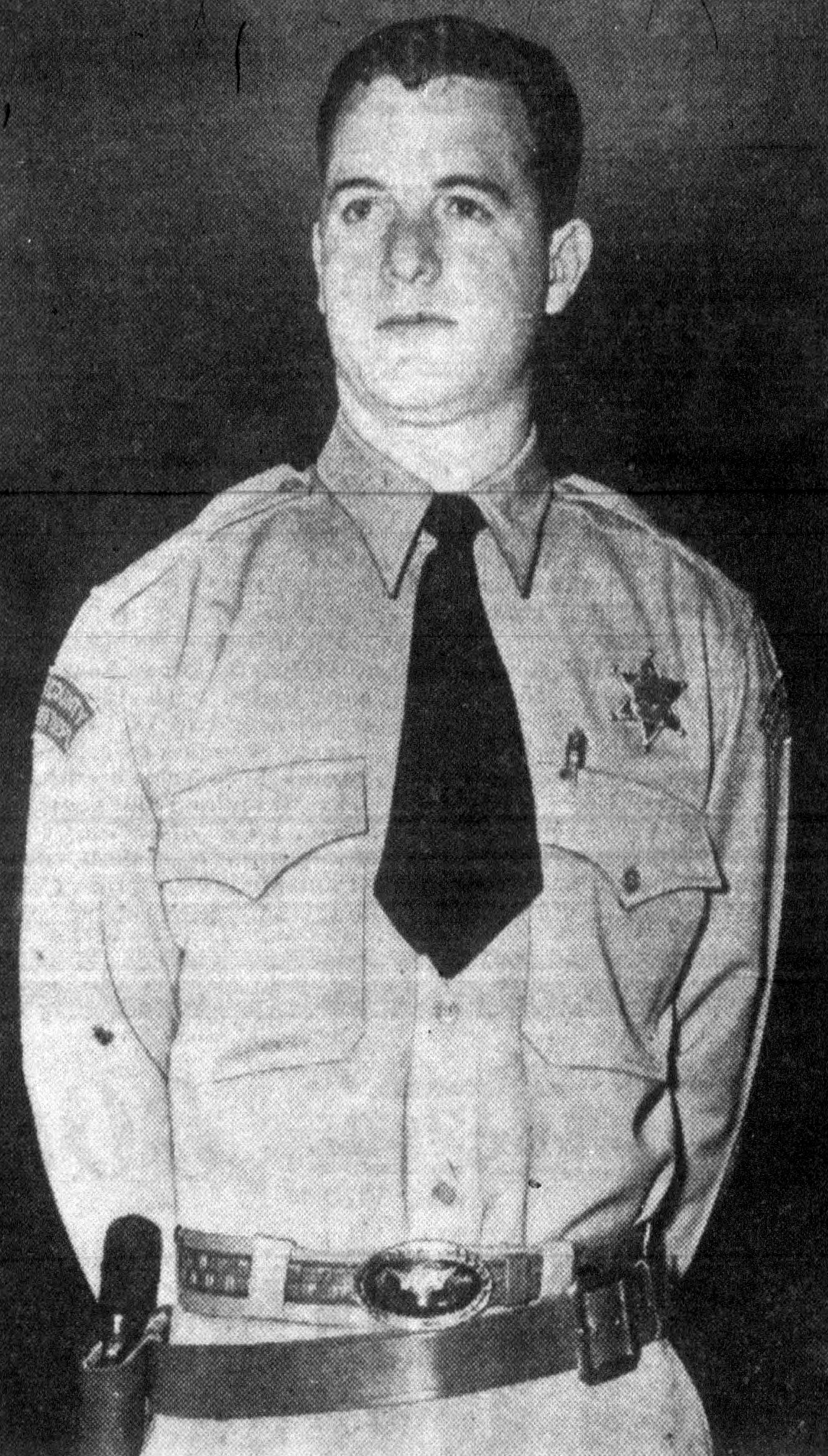
- Heath, circa 1950

No. 39, 97, 29
- Position: Quarterback

Personal information
- Born: March 5, 1927; Toledo, Ohio, U.S.
- Died: September 26, 2010 (aged 83); Jesup, Georgia, U.S.
- Listed height: 6 ft 1 in (1.85 m)
- Listed weight: 190 lb (86 kg)

Career information
- High school: Shorewood (Shorewood, Wisconsin)
- College: Wisconsin; Nevada
- NFL draft: 1949: 1st round, 5th overall pick

Career history
- Green Bay Packers (1949); Hamilton Tiger-Cats (1950); Cleveland Browns (1951)*; Calgary Stampeders (1951-1952); Hamilton Tiger-Cats (1953); Calgary Stampeders (1954)
- * Offseason or practice squad member only

Awards and highlights
- First-team All-American (1948); NCAA passing yards leader (1948); Second-team All-PCC (1948)

Career NFL statistics
- Passing attempts: 106
- Passing completions: 26
- Completion percentage: 24.5%
- TD–INT: 1–14
- Passing yards: 355
- Passer rating: 4.6
- Stats at Pro Football Reference

Stanley Robert Heath (March 5, 1927 – September 26, 2010) was an American professional football player who was a quarterback in the National Football League (NFL) who played 12 games for the Green Bay Packers.

Heath played college football for the Nevada Wolf Pack, where he was the nation's top passer. Previously, he had been a member of the Wisconsin Badgers. Heath was the first NCAA quarterback to throw for over 2,000 yards in a season, a mark that would not be surpassed for fifteen years. He finished 5th in the Heisman Trophy voting in 1948.

In 1948, the Packers drafted him in the 25th round with the 231st overall pick and again in the 1949 NFL draft with the fifth pick in the first round. Heath only played one season with the Packers before moving to the Canadian Football League (CFL).

Heath is the son of former major league baseball player Mickey Heath, the uncle of attorney and TruTV television commentator Robert W. Bigelow, and cousin to broadcaster and author Jim Heath.

Heath died at his home in Jesup, Georgia.

== See also ==
- List of NCAA major college football yearly passing leaders
- List of NCAA major college football yearly total offense leaders
