= Fred Enke (American football) =

American football player (1924–2014)

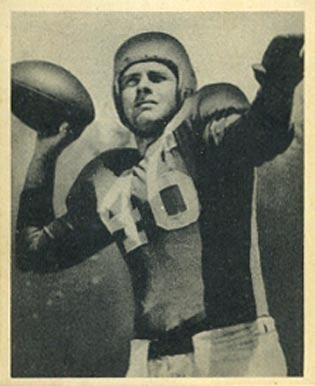
- Enke on a 1948 Bowman football card

No. 24, 17, 10
- Position: Quarterback

Personal information
- Born: December 15, 1924; Louisville, Kentucky, U.S.
- Died: April 13, 2014 (aged 89); Casa Grande, Arizona, U.S.
- Listed height: 6 ft 1 in (1.85 m)
- Listed weight: 208 lb (94 kg)

Career information
- High school: Tucson (Tucson, Arizona)
- College: Arizona (1946-1947)
- NFL draft: 1948: 7th round, 47th overall pick

Career history
- Detroit Lions (1948–1951); Philadelphia Eagles (1952); Baltimore Colts (1953–1954)

Awards and highlights
- NCAA passing yards leader (1947)

Career NFL statistics
- Passing attempts: 689
- Passing completions: 297
- Completion percentage: 43.1%
- TD–INT: 31–53
- Passing yards: 4,169
- Passer rating: 46.2
- Rushing yards: 640
- Rushing touchdowns: 1
- Stats at Pro Football Reference

Frederick William "Freddy" Enke Jr. (December 15, 1924 – April 13, 2014) was a professional American football quarterback who played in seven National Football League (NFL) seasons from 1948 to 1954 for the Detroit Lions, the Philadelphia Eagles, and the Baltimore Colts. He started for the Lions for two years.

== Biography ==
=== Early life ===
Fred Enke was born December 15, 1924, in Louisville, Kentucky.

His father, Fred August Enke, was a college basketball coach.

He graduated from Tucson High School as a three-sport star (football, baseball, basketball) in 1943 after starting a 52-game winning streak for the school as quarterback. He was a two-time All State quarterback leading the Badgers to the State Championship in all three sports during the 1942–43 school year.

=== Collegiate career ===
Enke played college football at the University of Arizona and was drafted in the seventh round of the 1948 NFL draft.

=== Life after football ===
After leaving the NFL, Enke retired to Casa Grande, Arizona to become a cotton farmer.

=== Death and legacy ===
Fred Enke died in 2014 from dementia, aged 89, in Casa Grande, Arizona.

Enke was inducted into the Arizona High School Sports Hall of Fame as an inaugural member in 2007.

== See also ==
- List of NCAA major college football yearly passing leaders
- List of NCAA major college football yearly total offense leaders
