= Bill Winter (Marshall Thundering Herd) =

American football player (born 1943)

No. 69
- Position: LB/G/K

Personal information
- Born: July 9, 1943 (age 83); Nitro, West Virginia

Career information
- High school: Nitro (WV)
- College: Marshall

Career history
- Charleston Rockets (1964–1965)

Awards and highlights
- All Kanawha County Football First Team, 1960 (Guard); All AAA West Virginia State Second Team, 1960 (Guard); All Mid-American Conference 2nd Team Player, 1963 (linebacker).; Captain, Marshall University Football Team, 1964; Marshall University Lineman of the Year, 1964; All Mid-American Conference 1st Team Player, 1964 (linebacker).; Inducted Marshall University Hall of Fame, 1990; Named to the Marshall University Field of Dreams Team, 1991

William Richard Winter (born July 9, 1943, in Nitro, West Virginia) is a former Marshall University football player.

== Early life ==
Winter graduated in 1961 from Nitro High School and is one of the greatest athletes the school has ever produced. As a member of the 1958 football team, Nitro went 9-0-1 for their first undefeated season in school history (the team also featured his older brother Wilbur who played fullback and would captain the team one year later). Bill Winter was a key player in Nitro High School's 1960 season in which they went 10–0 in the regular season, outscoring their opponents 258–44. Nitro played in the West Virginia AAA state championship game. The Nitro Wildcats ultimately lost to Weir by a score of 40–0. This was Nitro High School's first appearance in a state football championship game. Winter was named to the All AAA West Virginia State Second Team. Of note, Winter's youngest brother Tom would also play linebacker and guard for the Nitro High School football team from 1964 to 1966; during this span, the team would go 8-22.

Nitro High Wildcats	Regular season record	Notes
1958	9–0–1	first undefeated season
1959	6–4–0	
1960	10–0–0	lost in WV AAA State Championship to Weir 40–0; named to WV AAA 2nd Team

== College career ==
Winter went on to play college football at Marshall University. He received numerous offers at other schools including West Virginia University. He enjoyed a successful career playing on offense (guard), defense (linebacker), and on special teams (kick-off team and kicking PATs). Winter was one of only 4 sophomores to start for Marshall in 1962. He broke his ankle during the next to last game of the season against Xavier. After the game, Marshall head coach Charlie Snyder (American football) remarked, "That boy is the greatest sophomore football player I've ever coached." He was named to the All Mid-American Conference 2nd Team in 1963. During this season, Marshall finished at 5–4–1, for their first winning season since 1957 and only their second since joining the MAC in 1954. In 1964, Winter was named captain of the team along with teammate Jim Cure. Marshall would have its best football season during its first tenure in the MAC (1954–1968), finishing 7-3 and 2nd in the Mid-American Conference. During this season, Winter was named to the 1964 All Mid-American Conference Team. After Winter's departure, Marshall would post a 7-31-1 record during their last 4 seasons in the MAC, going winless in the last two seasons (1967–68). He is a member of the Pi Kappa Alpha fraternity.

In 1990, Winter was inducted into the Marshall University Hall of Fame. One year later, he would be named to the Marshall University Field of Dreams team during the dedication of Marshall University Stadium. The Thundering Herd defeated New Hampshire in that game before a crowd of 33,116.

Marshall University Football	1961	1962	1963	1964
Conference record	1–4–0	0–5–0	3–2–1	4–2–0
Overall record	2–7–1	4–6–0	5–4–1	7–3–0
Conference Rank	6th	7th	4th	2nd

== Professional career ==
Winter was evaluated by several NFL/AFL teams including the Dallas Cowboys who felt he was too small to play his position. He would eventually be drafted by the Charleston Rockets of the Continental Football League in 1965. Head coach Perry Moss said of Winter, "There's a real football player." "He sure came to play. I'd like to have more like him." Winter would see playing time as a linebacker against Fort Wayne (The Rockets would win 24–7) in a preseason game. Winter would leave the game early secondary to a laceration. He would later narrowly miss the final cut for the team. The Charleston Rockets would go undefeated at 14–0 in 1965 and defeat the Toronto Rifles 24–7 in the first Continental Football League championship game.

The following year, new Rockets Head Coach Sam Fernandez was reportedly interested in recruiting Winter back to the team saying, "At that time [when he was cut], he just needed more experience. I feel he has the potential to be a fine pro player."

== Coaching career ==
After college, Winter coached football at Andrew Lewis High School in Salem, VA beginning in 1967. He was coaching at Andrew Lewis High School during the 1971 Virginia State Championship game depicted in the film Remember the Titans. The real championship game was much less dramatic than the movie version with Andrew Lewis falling to T.C. Williams High School 27–0. Winter went on to coach at Roanoke Catholic School and Salem High School in Salem, VA when it opened in 1977. He was an assistant coach for the Virginia Hunters, a semi-pro team. His coaching career would end in the 1980s.

== Archives ==
1963 Scores/Newspaper Articles

Marshall 19, Toledo 18

Marshall 20, Kentucky State 0
