= Byron Rhome =

American sports coach and college athletics administrator

Biographical details
- Born: January 11, 1906; Kopperl, Texas, U.S.
- Died: April 24, 1992 (aged 86); Seattle, Washington, U.S.

Playing career

Football
- 1925–1928: Trinity (TX)

Basketball
- 1925–1929: Trinity (TX)

Baseball
- c. 1927: Trinity (TX)
- Position: End (football)

Coaching career (HC unless noted)

Football
- 1929–1930: Graham HS (TX)
- 1931–1934: Weatherford
- 1935–1936: Texas Wesleyan
- 1937: Sunset HS (TX) (assistant)
- 1944: Hondo AAF
- ?–1963: Sunset HS (TX) (assistant)

Basketball
- 1935–1937: Texas Wesleyan
- 1937–?: Sunset HS (TX)

Administrative career (AD unless noted)
- 1935–1937: Texas Wesleyan

Head coaching record
- Overall: 18–9–2 (college football); 14–24 (college basketball)

Byron Cogdell Rhome (January 11, 1906 – April 24, 1992) was an American football, basketball, and track coach and college athletics administrator. He served as the head football coach at Texas Wesleyan College—now known as Texas Wesleyan University—in Fort Worth, Texas from 1935 to 1936, compiling a record of 11–8–2. Rhome was also the head basketball coach at Texas Wesleyan for two season, from 1935 to 1937, tallying a mark of 14–24.

Rhome attended Cleburne High School in Cleburne, Texas, where he played football for the Cleburne Yellow Jackets. He moved on to Trinity University in Waxahachie, Texas, played football as an end for four seasons. He and also played basketball for four season and baseball for one. After graduating from Trinity in 1929, Rhome was appointed head football coach at Graham High School in Graham, Texas. In 1931, he was named football and track coach at Weatherford Junior College—now known as Weatherford College—in Weatherford, Texas.

Rhome was hired in 1935 as the athletic director at Texas Wesleyan College—now known as Texas Wesleyan University in Fort Worth, Texas and was charged with coaching football, basketball, and track. He led his Texas Wesleyan Rams football teams to records of 8–2–1 in 1935 and 3–6–1 in 1936. Rhome left Texas Wesleyan in 1937 to become head basketball coach at Sunset High School in Dallas. He was succeeded as Texas Wesleyan's head coach in football, basketball, and track by Gus Miller. Rhome coached the 1944 Hondo Army Air Field Navigators football team to a record of 7–1.

Rhome's son, Jerry Rhome, played football for him at Sunset and went on to play college football at the University of Tulsa and professionally in the National Football League (NFL) and Canadian Football League (CFL).

== Head coaching record ==
=== College football ===
Year	Team	Overall	Conference	Standing	Bowl/playoffs
Texas Wesleyan Rams (Independent) (1935–1936)
1935	Texas Wesleyan	8–2–1			
1936	Texas Wesleyan	3–6–1			
Texas Wesleyan:		11–8–2			
Hondo Army Air Field Navigators (Independent) (1944)
1944	Hondo AAF	7–1			
Hondo AAF:		7–1			
Total:		18–9–2			

=== Junior college football ===
Year	Team	Overall	Conference	Standing	Bowl/playoffs
Weatherford Coyotes () (1931–1932)
1931	Weatherford				
1932	Weatherford				
Weatherford Coyotes (Central Texas Conference) (1933–1934)
1933	Weatherford	6–4–1	2–2–1	3rd	
1934	Weatherford	7–3	4–1	2nd	
Weatherford:					
Total:					
