= Todd Dillon =

American gridiron football player (born 1962)

Profile
- Position: Quarterback

Personal information
- Born: January 6, 1962 (age 64); Modesto, California, U.S.

Career information
- College: Long Beach State

Career history
- 1984: Los Angeles Express
- 1985: Houston Gamblers
- 1985: New Jersey Generals
- 1986–1988: Ottawa Rough Riders
- 1988–1994: Hamilton Tiger-Cats

Awards and highlights
- NCAA passing yards leader (1982)

Todd Dillon (born January 6, 1962) is an American former professional gridiron football player, a quarterback in the Canadian Football League (CFL), where he played from 1986 to 1994 for the Ottawa Rough Riders and the Hamilton Tiger-Cats. Previously, he played two seasons in the United States Football League (USFL). Dillon played college football at Long Beach State University. He is now a teacher at Tokay High School in Lodi, California. He's also an assistant coach on the school's varsity football team. Prior, he taught at Lodi High School, which like Tokay, is part of the Lodi Unified School District. Dillon was also the Lodi football head coach.

== See also ==
- List of NCAA major college football yearly passing leaders
- List of NCAA major college football yearly total offense leaders
