= List of NCAA major college football yearly total offense leaders =

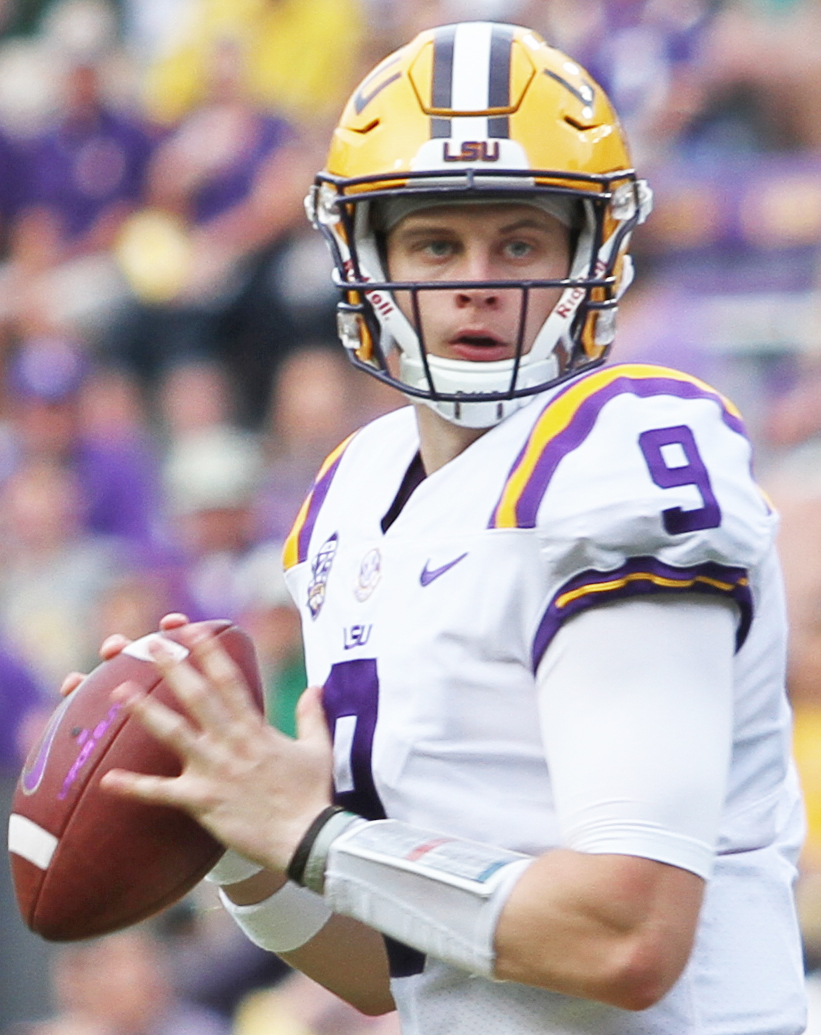
Joe Burrow is the all-time NCAA leader in single-season total yards, gaining over 6,000 with the LSU Tigers in 2019

The list of college football yearly total offense leaders identifies the major college leaders for each season from 1937 to the present. It includes yearly leaders in two statistical categories: (1) total offense yards, and (2) total offense yards per game. From 1937 to 1969, the NCAA determined its national total offense individual title based on total yardage. Starting in 1970, the NCAA began making that determination based on total offense yards per game.

== Total offense leaders ==
Key
^{†} = Winner of that year's Heisman Trophy
Bold = Figure established an NCAA major college record

Leaders in total offense by NCAA season
| Year | Name | Total yards | Name | YPG |
|---|---|---|---|---|
| 1937 | Byron White (Colorado) | 1,596 | | |
| 1938 | Davey O'Brien (TCU) | 1,847 | | |
| 1939 | Kenny Washington (UCLA) | 1,370 | Tom Harmon (Michigan) | 169.5 |
| 1940 | Johnny Knolla (Creighton) | 1,420 | Tom Harmon^{†} (Michigan) | 168.3 |
| 1941 | Bud Schwenk (Washington University in St. Louis) | **1,928** | Bud Schwenk | 214.2 |
| 1942 | Frank Sinkwich^{†} (Georgia) | **2,187** | | |
| 1943 | R. Hoernschemeyer (Indiana) | 1,648 | | |
| 1944 | Bob Fenimore (Oklahoma State) | 1,758 | Bob Fenimore | 219.75 |
| 1945 | Bob Fenimore (Oklahoma State) | 1,641 | Bob Fenimore | 205.1 |
| 1946 | Travis Tidwell (Auburn) | 1,715 | Travis Tidwell | 171.5 |
| 1947 | Fred Enke (Arizona) | 1,941 | Fred Enke | 194.1 |
| 1948 | Stan Heath (Nevada) | 1,992 | Stan Heath | 221.3 |
| 1949 | Johnny Bright (Drake) | 1,950 | | |
| 1950 | Johnny Bright (Drake) | **2,400** | Johnny Bright | **266.7** |
| 1951 | Dick Kazmaier^{†} (Princeton) | 1,827 | | |
| 1952 | Ted Marchibroda (Detroit) | 1,813 | | |
| 1953 | Paul Larson (California) | 1,572 | | |
| 1954 | George Shaw (Oregon) | 1,536 | | |
| 1955 | George Welsh (Navy) | 1,348 | | |
| 1956 | John Brodie (Stanford) | 1,642 | | |
| 1957 | Bob Newman (Washington State) | 1,444 | | |
| 1958 | Dick Bass (Pacific) | 1,440 | Randy Duncan (Iowa) | 156.2 |
| 1959 | Dick Norman (Stanford) | 2,018 | | |
| 1960 | Billy Kilmer (UCLA) | 1,889 | Billy Kilmer | 188.9 |
| 1961 | Dave Hoppmann (Iowa State) | 1,638 | Dave Hoppmann | 163.8 |
| 1962 | Terry Baker^{†} (Oregon State) | 2,276 | | |
| 1963 | George Mira (Miami [FL]) | 2,318 | George Mira | 231.8 |
| 1964 | Jerry Rhome (Tulsa) | **3,128** | Jerry Rhome | **312.8** |
| 1965 | Billy Anderson (Tulsa) | **3,343** | Billy Anderson | **334.3** |
| 1966 | Virgil Carter (BYU) | 2,545 | | |
| 1967 | Sal Olivas (New Mexico State) | 2,184 | | |
| 1968 | Greg Cook (Cincinnati) | 3,210 | Greg Cook | 321.0 |
| 1969 | Dennis Shaw (San Diego State) | 3,197 | | |
| 1970 | Jim Plunkett (Stanford) | 3,189 | Pat Sullivan (Auburn) | 285.6 |
| 1971 | Don Bunce (Stanford) | 2,805 | Gary Huff (Florida State) | 241.2 |
| 1972 | Don Strock (Virginia Tech) | 3,170 | Don Strock | 288.2 |
| 1973 | Jesse Freitas (San Diego State) | 2,901 | Jesse Freitas | 263.7 |
| 1974 | Gene Swick (Toledo) | 2,450 | Steve Joachim (Temple) | 222.7 |
| 1975 | Gene Swick (Toledo) | 2,706 | Gene Swick | 246.0 |
| 1976 | Tommy Kramer (Rice) | 3,272 | Tommy Kramer | 297.5 |
| 1977 | Doug Williams (Grambling) | 3,249 | Doug Williams | 293.5 |
| 1978 | Mike Ford (SMU) | 2,957 | Mike Ford | 268.8 |
| 1979 | Marc Wilson (BYU) | **3,580** | Marc Wilson | 325.5 |
| 1980 | Jim McMahon (BYU) | **4,627** | Jim McMahon | **385.6** |
| 1981 | Sam King (UNLV) | 3,562 | Jim McMahon | 345.8 |
| 1982 | Todd Dillon (Long Beach State) | 3,587 | Todd Dillon | 326.1 |
| 1983 | Steve Young (BYU) | 4,346 | Steve Young | **395.1** |
| 1984 | Doug Flutie^{†} (Boston College) | 4,013 | Robbie Bosco | 327.7 |
| 1985 | Robbie Bosco (BYU) | 4,141 | Jim Everett (Purdue) | 326.3 |
| 1986 | Mike Perez (San Jose State) | 3,250 | Mike Perez | 329.9 |
| 1987 | Todd Santos (San Diego State) | 3,688 | Todd Santos | 307.3 |
| 1988 | Scott Mitchell (Utah) | 4,299 | Scott Mitchell | 390.8 |
| 1989 | Andre Ware^{†} (Houston) | **4,661** | Andre Ware | **423.7** |
| 1990 | David Klingler (Houston) | **5,221** | David Klingler | **474.6** |
| 1991 | Ty Detmer (BYU) | 4,001 | Ty Detmer | 333.4 |
| 1992 | Jimmy Klingler (Houston) | 3,768 | Jimmy Klingler | 342.5 |
| 1993 | Chris Vargas (Nevada) | 4,332 | Chris Vargas | 393.8 |
| 1994 | Stoney Case (New Mexico) | 3,649 | Mike Maxwell (Nevada) | 318.0 |
| 1995 | Cody Ledbetter (New Mexico State) | 3,724 | Mike Maxwell (Nevada) | 402.6 |
| 1996 | Josh Wallwork (Wyoming) | 4,209 | Josh Wallwork | 350.8 |
| 1997 | Tim Rattay (Louisiana Tech) | 3,968 | Tim Rattay | 360.7 |
| 1998 | Tim Rattay | 4,865 | Tim Rattay | 403.3 |
| 1999 | Drew Brees (Purdue) | 4,086 | Tim Rattay | 381.0 |
| 2000 | Drew Brees (Purdue) | 4,189 | Drew Brees | 358.1 |
| 2001 | David Carr (Fresno State) | 4,906 | Rex Grossman (Florida) | 354.9 |
| 2002 | Kliff Kingsbury (Texas Tech) | 4,903 | Byron Leftwich (Marshall) | 355.6 |
| 2003 | B. J. Symons (Texas Tech) | 5,976 | B. J. Symons | 459.7 |
| 2004 | Sonny Cumbie (Texas Tech) | 4,575 | Sonny Cumbie | 381.3 |
| 2005 | Colt Brennan (Hawaii) | 4,455 | Colt Brennan | 371.3 |
| 2006 | Colt Brennan | 5,915 | Colt Brennan | 422.5 |
| 2007 | Graham Harrell (Texas Tech) | 5,614 | Graham Harrell | 431.8 |
| 2008 | Case Keenum (Houston) | 5,241 | Case Keenum | 403.2 |
| 2009 | Case Keenum | 5,829 | Case Keenum | 416.4 |
| 2010 | Bryant Moniz (Hawaii) | 5,142 | Bryant Moniz | 367.3 |
| 2011 | Case Keenum (Houston) | 5,666 | Case Keenum | 404.7 |
| 2012 | Johnny Manziel^{†} (Texas A&M) | 5,116 | Johnny Manziel | 393.5 |
| 2013 | Derek Carr (Fresno State) | 5,200 | Derek Carr | 399.9 |
| 2014 | Marcus Mariota^{†} (Oregon) | 5,224 | Connor Halliday (Washington State) | 415.8 |
| 2015 | Deshaun Watson (Clemson) | 5,209 | Patrick Mahomes (Texas Tech) | 393.0 |
| 2016 | Patrick Mahomes (Texas Tech) | 5,307 | Patrick Mahomes (Texas Tech) | 410.5 |
| 2017 | Lamar Jackson (Louisville) | 5,261 | Lamar Jackson (Louisville) | 404.7 |
| 2018 | Kyler Murray^{†} (Oklahoma) | 5,362 | Kyler Murray (Oklahoma) | 383.0 |
| 2019 | Joe Burrow^{†} (LSU) | **6,039** | Joe Burrow (LSU) | 402.6 |
| 2020 | Mac Jones (Alabama) | 4,514 | Matt Corral (Ole Miss) | 384.3 |
| 2021 | Bailey Zappe (Western Kentucky) | 5,984 | Bailey Zappe (Western Kentucky) | 427.4 |
| 2022 | Drake Maye (North Carolina) | 5,019 | Michael Penix Jr. (Washington) | 364.1 |
| 2023 | Jayden Daniels^{†} (LSU) | 4,946 | Jayden Daniels^{†} (LSU) | 412.2 |
| 2024 | Jaxson Dart (Ole Miss) | 4,774 | Jaxson Dart (Ole Miss) | 367.2 |
| 2025 | Drew Mestemaker (North Texas) | 4,468 | Byrum Brown (South Florida) | 347.2 |

== Pre-1937 unofficial data ==
Before 1937 the NCAA did not compile official statistics. This chart reflects unofficial total offense statistics compiled by historians mostly from newspaper accounts. Prior to 1913, total offense leaders will be almost exclusively due to rushing yards, and prior to 1906 there was no forward pass.

Unofficial leaders in total offense from 1901 to 1936
| Year | Name | Total yards | Name | YPG |
|---|---|---|---|---|
| 1936 | Sammy Baugh (TCU) | 1,324 | | |
| 1935 | Sammy Baugh (TCU) | 1,435 | | |
| 1934 | Dixie Howell (Alabama) | 1,437 | Dixie Howell | 143.7 |
| 1933 | | | | |
| 1932 | Pug Lund (Minnesota) | 1,203 | | |
| 1931 | | | | |
| 1930 | Marchy Schwartz (Notre Dame) | 1,246 | | |
| 1929 | Lloyd Brazil (Detroit) | | | |
| 1928 | Ken Strong (NYU) | 3,000 | Ken Strong | 300 |
| 1927 | Bill Spears (Vanderbilt) | 2,001 | Bill Spears | 181.9 |
| 1926 | Gibby Welch (Pittsburgh) | 1,964 or 1,172 | | |
| 1925 | Swede Oberlander (Dartmouth) | 1,147 | | |
| 1924 | Red Grange (Illinois) | 1,176 | Red Grange | 147 |
| 1923 | | | | |
| 1922 | | | | |
| 1921 | Aubrey Devine (Iowa) | 2,211 | Aubrey Devine | 315.9 |
| 1920 | Jimmy Leech (VMI) | 1,771 | Jimmy Leech | 196.8 |
| 1919 | George Gipp (Notre Dame) | 1,456 | George Gipp | 161.8 |
| 1918 | | | | |
| 1917 | | | | |
| 1916 | | | | |
| 1915 | | | | |
| 1914 | | | | |
| 1913 | | | | |
| 1912 | Jim Thorpe (Carlisle) | 1,972 | Jim Thorpe | 140.9 |
| 1911 | Jim Thorpe (Carlisle) | 914 | | |
| 1910 | | | | |
| 1909 | | | | |
| 1908 | Jim Thorpe (Carlisle) | 993 | | |
| 1907 | | | | |
| 1906 | | | | |
| 1905 | | | | |
| 1904 | Willie Heston (Michigan) | 686 | | |
| 1903 | | | | |
| 1902 | | | | |
| 1901 | Willie Heston (Michigan) | 684 | | |
