= Ray Forsberg =

American football quarterback

Profile
- Position: Quarterback

Career information
- College: Utah (1929–1930)

Awards and highlights
- Led NCAA in passing TDs (11, 1930)

Ray Forsberg was a college football player. He was a prominent quarterback for the Utah Utes football team. Forsberg led the nation in touchdown passes with 11 in 1930.
