= Billy Anderson (quarterback) =

American football player (1941–1996)

No. 14
- Position: Quarterback

Personal information
- Born: February 17, 1941; Palmer, Texas, U.S.
- Died: April 11, 1996 (aged 55); Houston, Texas, U.S.
- Listed height: 6 ft 1 in (1.85 m)
- Listed weight: 195 lb (88 kg)

Career information
- High school: Ferris (Ferris, Texas)
- College: SMU (1960–1961); Tulsa (1962–1964)
- NFL draft: 1965: 19th round, 261st overall pick
- AFL draft: 1965: red shirt 11th round, 81st overall pick

Career history
- Houston Oilers (1967)

Awards and highlights
- Second-team All-American (1965); NCAA passing yards leader (1965); First-team All-MVC (1965); Tulsa Golden Hurricane No. 14 retired

Career NFL statistics
- Games played: 8
- Stats at Pro Football Reference

Billy Guy Anderson (February 17, 1941 – April 11, 1996) was an American professional football player who was a quarterback for the Houston Oilers of the American Football League (AFL). He played college football for the SMU Mustangs and the Tulsa Golden Hurricane.

== College career ==
Anderson played college football at Southern Methodist University for the Mustangs, after two years with them, he transferred to the University of Tulsa and played for the Golden Hurricane. At Tulsa, he established school and NCAA records as the starting quarterback in 1965. He led the nation in passing and total offense while setting school records for most passing yards in one game with 502, most passing yards in a season (3,464), most completions in a game (42) and most passing attempts in one game (65). Completing 58% of his passes, he had 30 touchdown passes in 1965. He was an All-Missouri Valley Conference performer his senior season.

In the 1960s, Tulsa took the collegiate passing game to a level never seen before. The Golden Hurricane averaged nearly 318 yards in 1964, and increased that average to 346 yards a year later. Anderson helped revolutionize the way college football was played.

Anderson threw the first touchdown pass in Astrodome history—to Galena Park's Howard Twilley—when Tulsa defeated the Houston Cougars 14–0 in 1965, the first football game ever played in the dome. Anderson also led the nation in passing that year.

In 1986, Anderson was inducted into the Tulsa Athletic Hall of Fame and his jersey no. 14 was retired on September 25, 1995.

== Professional career ==
Anderson played professionally in the American Football League (AFL) for the Houston Oilers a lone season in 1967, playing in eight games. He was selected by the Oilers in the eleventh round of the 1965 AFL redshirt draft, with the 81st overall pick.

He was also selected by the Los Angeles Rams in the 19th round of the 1965 NFL draft, but never played for them.

== Death ==
He died on April 11, 1996, of amyotrophic lateral sclerosis (known popularly as Lou Gehrig's disease).

== See also ==
- List of American Football League players
- List of NCAA major college football yearly passing leaders
- List of NCAA major college football yearly total offense leaders
