= Charlie Snyder (American football) =

American football player and coach (1922–2007)

Biographical details
- Born: September 14, 1922; Kenova, West Virginia, U.S.
- Died: February 5, 2007 (aged 84); Bellevue, Ohio, U.S.

Playing career
- –1947: Marshall
- Position: Tackle

Coaching career (HC unless noted)
- 1948–1956: Catlettsburg HS (KY)
- 1958: Kentucky (offensive backs)
- 1959–1967: Marshall
- 1970–1976: Toledo (WR)

Head coaching record
- Overall: 28–58–3 (college); 55–21–4 (high school)

Charles Colbert Snyder (September 14, 1922 – February 5, 2007) was an American football coach. He served as the head football coach at Marshall University from 1959 to 1967, compiling a record of 28–58–3. A native of Catlettsburg, Kentucky, Snyder played college football in the late 1940s as a tackle under Cam Henderson. From 1948 to 1956 he was the head football coach at his alma mater, Catlettsburg High School, leading his teams to a record of 55–21–4 in nine seasons. Snyder also worked as an assistant football coach at the University of Kentucky and the University of Toledo. He died at the age of 84, on February 5, 2007, in Bellevue, Ohio.

== Head coaching record ==
=== College ===
Year	Team	Overall	Conference	Standing	Bowl/playoffs
Marshall Thundering Herd (Mid-American Conference) (1959–1967)
1959	Marshall	1–8	1–4	6th	
1960	Marshall	2–7–1	1–4	6th	
1961	Marshall	2–7–1	1–4	6th	
1962	Marshall	4–6	0–5	7th	
1963	Marshall	5–4–1	3–2–1	4th	
1964	Marshall	7–3	4–2	T–2nd	
1965	Marshall	5–5	2–4	T–5th	
1966	Marshall	2–8	1–5	T–6th	
1967	Marshall	0–10	0–6	7th	
Marshall:		28–58–3	13–36		
Total:		28–58–3			
