= Jerry Rhome =

American football player (born 1942)

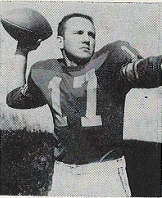
- Rhome, featured in the 1964 Tulsa Golden Hurricane media guide

No. 13, 17
- Position: Quarterback

Personal information
- Born: March 6, 1942 (age 84); Dallas, Texas, U.S.
- Listed height: 6 ft 0 in (1.83 m)
- Listed weight: 190 lb (86 kg)

Career information
- High school: Sunset (Dallas)
- College: Tulsa (1963–1964)
- NFL draft: 1964: 13th round, 172nd overall pick
- AFL draft: 1964: 25th round, 195th overall pick

Career history

Playing
- Dallas Cowboys (1965–1968); Cleveland Browns (1969); Houston Oilers (1970); Los Angeles Rams (1971); Montreal Alouettes (1972)

Coaching
- Seattle Seahawks (1976–1982); Quarterbacks coach (1976–1977); Offensive coordinator & quarterbacks coach (1978–1982); Washington Redskins (1983–1987) Quarterbacks coach; San Diego Chargers (1988) Offensive coordinator; Dallas Cowboys (1989) Quarterbacks coach; Phoenix Cardinals (1990–1993) Offensive coordinator; Minnesota Vikings (1994) Wide receivers coach; Houston Oilers (1995–1996) Offensive coordinator; St. Louis Rams (1997–1998) Offensive coordinator; Atlanta Falcons (2000) Quarterbacks coach; Minnesota Vikings (2005) Offensive consultant

Awards and highlights
- Super Bowl champion (XXII); 2× First-team All-MVC (1963, 1964); First-team All-American (1964); Sammy Baugh Trophy (1964); AP Back of the year (1964); NCAA passing yards leader (1964); Tulsa Golden Hurricane Jersey No. 17 retired

Career NFL statistics
- Passing attempts: 280
- Passing completions: 139
- Completion percentage: 49.6%
- TD–INT: 7–14
- Passing yards: 1,628
- Passer rating: 55.2
- Stats at Pro Football Reference
- Coaching profile at Pro Football Reference
- College Football Hall of Fame

Jerry Byron Rhome (born March 6, 1942) is an American former professional football player who was a quarterback in the National Football League (NFL) for the Dallas Cowboys, Cleveland Browns, Houston Oilers and Los Angeles Rams. He closed out his professional career with the Montreal Alouettes of the Canadian Football League (CFL). He played college football at the University of Tulsa.

== Early life ==
Rhome attended Sunset High School in Texas, where he played football for his father, Byron Rhome. He also practiced basketball and baseball.

Rhome accepted a football scholarship from Southern Methodist University (SMU). He became a starter at quarterback as a sophomore, registering 74 completions (led the conference) out of 129 attempts (second in the conference) for 693 yards (second in the conference), one touchdown and 6 interceptions. In 1961, he transferred to the University of Tulsa after a 2–7–1 football season, which led to the firing of head coach Bill Meek.

In 1963 after sitting out a year, Rhome starred at Tulsa, passing for 1,909 yards, 10 touchdowns, and suffering 13 interceptions. He improved as a senior, with 2,870 passing yards, 32 touchdowns and just 4 interceptions, while leading the nation in total offense (3,128 yards). He finished second in the voting for the Heisman Trophy—to John Huarte of Notre Dame—in one of the closest elections ever recorded.

Rhome held a number of NCAA records, including the largest number of touchdowns in a game, in a season, and the most consecutive passes without an interception in a football season and in his career. Rhome also won the Sammy Baugh Trophy in 1964, and had his Number 17 jersey retired by the school.

In 1984, he was inducted into the University of Tulsa Athletic Hall of Fame. In 1988, he was inducted into the College Football Hall of Fame. He also was inducted into the Oklahoma Sports Hall of Fame, the Texas High School Hall of Fame, the Inaugural Class of the Dallas Independent School District Athletic Hall of Fame and the Sunset High School Hall of Fame.

== Professional career ==
=== Dallas Cowboys ===
Knowing that he had one more year of eligibility, the Dallas Cowboys selected him in the thirteenth round (172nd overall) of the 1964 NFL draft with a future draft pick, as would the New York Jets in the 25th round (195th overall) of the 1964 AFL draft.

Rhome began his professional career in 1965 as the third quarterback behind Don Meredith and Craig Morton; he got a chance to start one game that same year against the Cleveland Browns (17–23 loss).

He would serve in a backup role until the start of the 1969 season when Roger Staubach joined the team, and at his request the Cowboys traded Rhome to the Cleveland Browns in exchange for a third round draft choice, later used to select Charlie Waters in the 1970 NFL draft.

=== Cleveland Browns ===
In 1969, although Rhome was a backup to Bill Nelsen, the information he provided about the Cowboys offense helped the Browns beat them in a 38-14 Conference Championship playoff win.

On January 27, 1970, he was traded to the Houston Oilers in exchange for a third round draft choice, that they gave back to the Dallas Cowboys in payment for their original trade.

=== Houston Oilers ===
Rhome would only play as a backup for the Houston Oilers for a year. On August 17, 1971, he was waived after the team decided to keep rookies Dan Pastorini and Lynn Dickey, to back up starter Charley Johnson.

=== Los Angeles Rams ===
On August 19, 1971, he was claimed off the waiver wire by the Los Angeles Rams, where he was a backup for one year. On August 24, 1972, he was released after the Rams acquired quarterback Pete Beathard.

=== Montreal Alouettes ===
In October 1972, he signed with the Montreal Alouettes of the Canadian Football League. On December 18, he announced his retirement.

== Coaching life ==
After he finished his pro playing career, Rhome became an assistant coach at the University of Tulsa. Next, his first of many NFL coaching jobs was with the Seattle Seahawks. Then while with the Washington Redskins, he earned a Super Bowl championship ring. Rhome is also credited with the signing of future hall of fame wide receiver Steve Largent with the Seattle Seahawks.

== See also ==
- List of NCAA major college football yearly passing leaders
- List of NCAA major college football yearly total offense leaders
