= Jeff Jordan (defensive back) =

American football player (1943–2022)

No. 22
- Position: Defensive back

Personal information
- Born: November 23, 1943; San Antonio, Texas, U.S.
- Died: October 2, 2022 (aged 78)
- Listed height: 6 ft 4 in (1.93 m)
- Listed weight: 190 lb (86 kg)

Career information
- High school: Bristow (Bristow, Oklahoma)
- College: Tulsa (1961–1964)
- NFL draft: 1965: 8th round, 107th overall pick
- AFL draft: 1965: 15th round, 113th overall pick

Career history
- Minnesota Vikings (1965–1968) (Note: Retired before the start of the 1968 season.)

Awards and highlights
- First-team All-MVC (1964); Second-team All-MVC (1963)

Career NFL statistics
- Interceptions: 4
- Fumble recoveries: 1
- Stats at Pro Football Reference

Jeffery Flynn Jordan (November 23, 1943 – October 2, 2022) was an American professional football player who was a defensive back for three seasons in the National Football League (NFL) for the Minnesota Vikings. He played college football for the Tulsa Golden Hurricane.

== Early life and education ==
Jordan was born on November 23, 1943, in San Antonio, Texas, to Betty Flynn Jordan and Leroy Marion. He grew up in Bristow, Oklahoma, and attended Bristow High School there, where he excelled academically and played multiple sports, including football, basketball, and golf. In football, he played quarterback and earned all-state as well as Prep All-America honors. As a student, Jordan was class salutatorian and class president as a sophomore and senior.

Jordan was given a full scholarship to the University of Tulsa for his football talents and played several seasons as a two-way player. He twice was named All-Missouri Valley Conference, as a second-team selection in 1963 and a first-team choice in 1964, and still holds several school records, including the longest interception return in team history (97 yards, against Memphis State in 1963) and the single-game and career records for interception return yards. During his junior year, 1963, Jordan had 34 receptions for 451 yards and three touchdowns; one of his scores was a 98-yard catch which set the record at the time for longest play in Tulsa history. As a senior in 1964, he was named team captain and intercepted nine passes, being considered one of the "finest players in the country" while leading his team to a win in the Bluebonnet Bowl. He also caught seven passes for 115 yards and three touchdowns, ending his collegiate career with 49 receptions for 662 yards and six scores.

Jordan graduated in 1965 with a degree in industrial psychology and was a finalist that year for a Rhodes Scholarship, although he ultimately did not win it. He was inducted in 1988 to the Tulsa Athletics Hall of Fame.

== Professional career ==
Jordan was selected in the eighth round (107th overall) of the 1965 NFL draft by the Minnesota Vikings and in the 15th round (113th overall) of the 1965 AFL draft by the Denver Broncos, and chose to join the former. As a rookie, Jordan appeared in 12 out of 14 games and recorded four interceptions, which he returned for 45 yards. He had two games with two interceptions, gaining 20 yards off them in their week 12 loss to the Green Bay Packers and 25 in their week 14 win over the Chicago Bears. He also made one fumble recovery and played as a starter in four matches.

In his second NFL season, Jordan played in all 14 games as a backup free safety. He appeared in 11 games in 1967, including at least one as a starter. (Note: Pro-Football-Reference.com lists one start, while Pro Football Archives records two.) He retired prior to the 1968 season, and finished his career with a total of 37 games played and four interceptions in three seasons.

During his National Football League career, Jordan was nicknamed "The Blade" due to his "tall, thin stature" being likened to a blade of grass.

== Later life and death ==
Jordan's first wife was killed in a plane crash while traveling to a Vikings exhibition game in 1966. He remarried in 1968; quarterback Fran Tarkenton served as best man.

After retiring from professional football, Jordan became a businessman with Merrill Lynch, Pierce, Fenner & Smith and served with the firm until his retirement in 2018 after 50 years with them. He served as resident manager for the South Tulsa office for two decades and additionally was a perennial member with the Chairman's Club. He also was a mentor with the business and "had a huge impact on dozens of advisors," according to Tulsa World.

Jordan died on October 2, 2022, at age 78.
