= Mark Reed (Arizona Wildcats) =

American football player

Profile
- Position: Quarterback

Personal information
- Born: 1946 or 1947 (age 79–80)

Career information
- High school: Cleveland (Los Angeles, California)
- College: Pierce (1964–1965); Arizona (1966–1967)
- AFL draft: 1968: undrafted

Career history
- Denver Broncos (1968)*; Atlanta Falcons (1969–1970)*
- * Offseason or practice squad member only

Awards and highlights
- NCAA passing yards leader (1966)

Mark Reed (born 1946 or 1947) is an American former football quarterback. He played college football for the Arizona Wildcats, and led the country in passing yards in 1966.

== Early life ==
Reed was born in either 1946 or 1947. He played high school football at Cleveland High School in Los Angeles, and was a two-year starter at quarterback from 1962 to 1963. He earned All-League honors in high school.

== College career ==
Reed played his first two years of college football at Los Angeles Pierce College from 1964 to 1965. He then transferred to the University of Arizona, where he played for the Arizona Wildcats from 1966 to 1967. As a junior, he completed 193 of 365 passes (52.9%) for 2,368 yards, 20 touchdowns, and 16 interceptions while also scoring four rushing touchdowns. His 2,368 passing yards were the most in the country. Reed was limited by a sore back in 1967, only attempting 139 passes for 54 completions (38.8%), 759 yards, four touchdowns, and 14 interceptions.

== Professional career ==
Reed went undrafted in the 1968 NFL/AFL draft. He signed with the Denver Broncos of the American Football League on June 18, 1968. However, he was then drafted into the United States Army Reserve.

Reed signed with the Atlanta Falcons in 1969 but decided to quit professional football in late July 1969. He signed with the Falcons again on March 26, 1970. He was later released on August 10, 1970.

== Personal life ==
Reed graduated from California State University, Northridge with a physical education degree in 1974. He was a salesman for 16 years until quitting to become an assistant football coach at his alma mater, Cleveland High, in 1990.
