= Garry Porterfield =

American football player (born 1943)

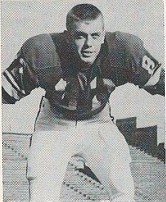
- Porterfield in the 1964 Tulsa Golden Hurricane football media guide

No. 86, 52
- Positions: Offensive guard, linebacker

Personal information
- Born: August 14, 1943 (age 83); Pawnee, Oklahoma, U.S.
- Listed height: 6 ft 3 in (1.91 m)
- Listed weight: 231 lb (105 kg)

Career information
- High school: Bixby (OK)
- College: Tulsa
- NFL draft: 1965: 14th round, 187th overall pick
- AFL draft: 1965: 17th round, 131st overall pick

Career history
- Dallas Cowboys (1965); BC Lions (1965–1966)

Awards and highlights
- All-MVC (1964)

Career NFL statistics
- Games played: 2
- Stats at Pro Football Reference

Garry Mark Porterfield (born August 4, 1943) is an American former professional football player who was an offensive guard in the National Football League (NFL) for the Dallas Cowboys. He was also a linebacker for the BC Lions in the Canadian Football League (CFL). He played college football for the Tulsa Golden Hurricane.

== Early life ==
Porterfield attended Bixby High School. He accepted a football scholarship from the University of Tulsa, where he was a two-way end.

== Professional career ==
Porterfield was selected by the Dallas Cowboys in the 14th round (187th overall) of the 1965 NFL draft. He also was selected by the Oakland Raiders in the 17th round (131st overall) of the 1965 AFL draft. In December 1964, he opted to sign with the Cowboys. He was considered a defensive end, before switching to linebacker and then to offensive guard. Porterfield played in two games for the Cowboys. He was waived on September 30.

In October 1965, he signed with the BC Lions of the Canadian Football League, where he played 2 seasons at outside linebacker. He was released in 1967.

== Personal life ==
In 1968, he was named the offensive line coach at the University of Tulsa.
