= 1964 NAIA football season =

American college football season

- Regular season: August–December 1964
- Postseason: December 5–12, 1964
- National Championship: ARC Stadium; Augusta, GA
- Champion: Concordia (MN) & Sam Houston State

The 1964 NAIA football season was the ninth season of college football sponsored by the NAIA. The season was played from August to December 1964, culminating in the ninth annual NAIA Football National Championship, played this year at ARC Stadium in Augusta, Georgia.

Concordia (MN) and Sam Houston State played to a 7–7 tie and were declared co-national champions. This was the first NAIA national title for both teams.

== Conference standings ==
1964 Arkansas Intercollegiate Conference football standings
	Conf.					Overall
Team	W		L		T	W		L		T
No. 16 Arkansas Tech $	7	–	0	–	0	9	–	1	–	0
Arkansas A&M	6	–	1	–	0	8	–	2	–	0
Arkansas State Teachers	4	–	3	–	0	5	–	4	–	0
Southern Arkansas	4	–	3	–	0	4	–	6	–	0
Henderson State	3	–	3	–	1	0	–	3	–	6
Ouachita Baptist	2	–	4	–	1	4	–	5	–	1
Harding	1	–	6	–	0	2	–	8	–	0
Ozarks	0	–	7	–	0	0	–	8	–	0
$ – Conference champion; Rankings from NAIA poll

1964 Carolinas Conference football standings
	Conf.					Overall
Team	W		L		T	W		L		T
No. 20 Elon $	4	–	1	–	1	8	–	1	–	1
Western Carolina	4	–	2	–	0	5	–	4	–	0
Appalachian State	3	–	2	–	0	6	–	3	–	0
Catawba	3	–	3	–	0	5	–	6	–	0
Lenoir Rhyne	2	–	3	–	1	3	–	6	–	1
Guilford	2	–	3	–	0	4	–	6	–	0
Newberry	1	–	5	–	0	1	–	9	–	0
$ – Conference champion; Rankings from NAIA poll

1964 Central Intercollegiate Conference football standings
	Conf.					Overall
Team	W		L		T	W		L		T
No. 9 Washburn $	4	–	0	–	0	8	–	1	–	0
Fort Hays State	2	–	2	–	0	5	–	4	–	0
Omaha	2	–	2	–	0	5	–	4	–	0
Pittsburg State	2	–	2	–	0	4	–	5	–	0
Emporia State	0	–	4	–	0	0	–	9	–	0
$ – Conference champion; Rankings from NAIA poll

1964 College Conference of Illinois football standings
	Conf.					Overall
Team	W		L		T	W		L		T
Illinois Wesleyan $	5	–	0	–	1	7	–	1	–	1
Augustana (IL)	5	–	1	–	0	7	–	1	–	0
Carthage	4	–	2	–	0	4	–	4	–	0
North Central (IL)	2	–	3	–	1	4	–	3	–	1
Carroll (WI)	2	–	3	–	1	3	–	4	–	1
Millikin	1	–	4	–	1	1	–	6	–	1
North Park	0	–	6	–	0	0	–	8	–	0
$ – Conference champion

1964 Evergreen Conference football standings
	Conf.					Overall
Team	W		L		T	W		L		T
Pacific Lutheran $	5	–	2	–	0	6	–	3	–	0
Whitworth	4	–	3	–	0	6	–	3	–	0
Central Washington	4	–	3	–	0	5	–	3	–	1
Western Washington	4	–	3	–	0	5	–	3	–	1
Eastern Washington	4	–	3	–	0	5	–	4	–	0
Puget Sound	0	–	7	–	0	1	–	8	–	0
$ – Conference champion

1964 Gateway Conference football standings
	Conf.					Overall
Team	W		L		T	W		L		T
Milton $	4	–	0	–	0	6	–	2	–	0
Northwestern (WI)	3	–	1	–	0	4	–	2	–	0
Illinois–Chicago	2	–	2	–	0	3	–	5	–	0
Lakeland	1	–	3	–	0	1	–	7	–	0
Eureka	0	–	4	–	0	0	–	7	–	0
$ – Conference champion

1964 Great Plains College Association football standings
	Conf.					Overall
Team	W		L		T	W		L		T
Nebraska Wesleyan $	3	–	0	–	0	7	–	1	–	0
Hastings	2	–	1	–	0	6	–	3	–	0
Doane	1	–	2	–	0	3	–	5	–	1
Colorado College	0	–	3	–	0	1	–	7	–	0
$ – Conference champion

1964 Iowa Conference football standings
	Conf.					Overall
Team	W		L		T	W		L		T
No. 17 Central (IA) +	7	–	1	–	0	8	–	1	–	0
Upper Iowa +	7	–	1	–	0	8	–	1	–	0
Luther	6	–	2	–	0	6	–	3	–	0
Simpson (IA)	5	–	3	–	0	6	–	3	–	0
Dubuque	3	–	5	–	0	3	–	5	–	1
Iowa Wesleyan	3	–	5	–	0	3	–	5	–	0
Buena Vista	2	–	5	–	1	3	–	5	–	1
Wartburg	2	–	5	–	1	2	–	6	–	1
William Penn	0	–	8	–	0	0	–	9	–	0
+ – Conference co-champions; Rankings from NAIA poll

1964 Kansas Collegiate Athletic Conference football standings
	Conf.					Overall
Team	W		L		T	W		L		T
No. 18 Ottawa +	8	–	1	–	0	8	–	1	–	0
Southwestern (KS) +	8	–	1	–	0	8	–	1	–	0
Baker	7	–	2	–	0	7	–	2	–	0
College of Emporia	7	–	2	–	0	7	–	2	–	0
McPherson	4	–	5	–	0	4	–	5	–	0
Bethany (KS)	3	–	6	–	0	3	–	6	–	0
Kansas Wesleyan	3	–	6	–	0	3	–	6	–	0
Bethel (KS)	2	–	7	–	0	2	–	7	–	0
Friends	2	–	7	–	0	2	–	7	–	0
Sterling	1	–	8	–	0	1	–	8	–	0
+ – Conference co-champions; Rankings from NAIA poll

1964 Lone Star Conference football standings
	Conf.					Overall
Team	W		L		T	W		L		T
No. 2/10 Sam Houston State $^	5	–	1	–	0	9	–	1	–	1
No. 14/NR Sul Ross	4	–	1	–	1	7	–	3	–	1
Southwest Texas State	4	–	2	–	0	7	–	2	–	0
Texas A&I	3	–	2	–	1	7	–	2	–	1
Stephen F. Austin	3	–	3	–	0	4	–	5	–	0
East Texas State	1	–	5	–	0	2	–	7	–	0
Howard Payne	0	–	6	–	0	2	–	8	–	0
$ – Conference champion; ^ – NAIA playoff participant; Rankings from NAIA poll and AP small college poll

1964 Mid-Ohio Conference football standings
	Conf.					Overall
Team	W		L		T	W		L		T
Ashland $	3	–	0	–	0	6	–	3	–	0
Bluffton	2	–	1	–	0	3	–	5	–	1
Defiance	1	–	2	–	0	4	–	4	–	0
Wilmington (OH)	0	–	3	–	0	2	–	5	–	1
$ – Conference champion

1964 Midwest Conference football standings
	Conf.					Overall
Team	W		L		T	W		L		T
Coe +	7	–	1	–	0	7	–	1	–	0
Cornell (IA) +	7	–	1	–	0	7	–	1	–	0
Ripon +	7	–	1	–	0	7	–	1	–	0
Beloit	5	–	3	–	0	5	–	3	–	0
Grinnell	5	–	3	–	0	5	–	3	–	0
St. Olaf	4	–	4	–	0	4	–	4	–	0
Lawrence	2	–	6	–	0	2	–	6	–	0
Monmouth (IL)	2	–	6	–	0	2	–	6	–	0
Knox	1	–	7	–	0	1	–	7	–	0
Carleton	0	–	8	–	0	0	–	8	–	0
+ – Conference co-champions

1964 Minnesota Intercollegiate Athletic Conference football standings
	Conf.					Overall
Team	W		L		T	W		L		T
No. 1 Concordia (MN) $^	7	–	0	–	0	10	–	0	–	1
Augsburg	5	–	2	–	0	6	–	3	–	0
Gustavus Adolphus	4	–	3	–	0	5	–	4	–	0
Saint John's (MN)	4	–	3	–	0	4	–	3	–	0
St. Thomas (MN)	3	–	4	–	0	3	–	6	–	0
Minnesota–Duluth	2	–	5	–	0	4	–	5	–	0
Hamline	2	–	5	–	0	2	–	7	–	0
Macalester	1	–	6	–	0	1	–	7	–	0
$ – Conference champion; ^ – NAIA playoff participant; Rankings from NAIA poll

1964 Missouri College Athletic Union football standings
	Conf.					Overall
Team	W		L		T	W		L		T
William Jewell $	4	–	0	–	0	6	–	3	–	0
Missouri Valley	3	–	1	–	0	7	–	2	–	0
Graceland	3	–	2	–	0	4	–	4	–	0
Central Methodist	1	–	2	–	0	4	–	4	–	0
Tarkio	1	–	3	–	0	2	–	7	–	0
Culver–Stockton	0	–	4	–	0	1	–	6	–	1
$ – Conference champion

1964 Montana Collegiate Conference football standings
	Conf.					Overall
Team	W		L		T	W		L		T
Upper Division
Eastern Montana x$	4	–	1	–	0	5	–	3	–	0
Carroll (MT)	3	–	2	–	0	5	–	3	–	0
Western Montana	2	–	3	–	0	4	–	4	–	0
Lower Division
Montana Mines x	2	–	2	–	1	?	–	?	–	?
Rocky Mountain x	2	–	2	–	1	?	–	?	–	?
Northern Montana	1	–	4	–	0	?	–	?	–	?
$ – Conference champion; x – Division champion/co-champions

1964 Nebraska College Conference football standings
	Conf.					Overall
Team	W		L		T	W		L		T
No. 12 Kearney State $	4	–	0	–	0	7	–	1	–	0
Wayne State (NE)	3	–	1	–	0	6	–	2	–	0
Hastings	2	–	2	–	0	6	–	3	–	0
Peru State	1	–	3	–	0	2	–	7	–	0
Chadron State	0	–	4	–	0	1	–	7	–	0
$ – Conference champion; Rankings from NAIA poll

1964 North Dakota College Athletic Conference football standings
	Conf.					Overall
Team	W		L		T	W		L		T
Valley City State +	5	–	1	–	0	7	–	1	–	0
Mayville State +	5	–	1	–	0	6	–	2	–	0
Dickinson State	4	–	2	–	0	6	–	2	–	0
Minot State	4	–	2	–	0	5	–	3	–	0
Wahpeton Science	2	–	4	–	0	?	–	?	–	?
Jamestown	1	–	5	–	0	1	–	7	–	0
Ellendale	0	–	6	–	0	?	–	?	–	?
+ – Conference co-champions

1964 Northern Intercollegiate Conference football standings
	Conf.					Overall
Team	W		L		T	W		L		T
Winona State $	5	–	0	–	0	6	–	1	–	0
Moorhead State	4	–	1	–	0	4	–	4	–	0
Bemidji State	3	–	2	–	0	4	–	4	–	0
Michigan Tech	2	–	3	–	0	4	–	4	–	1
Mankato State	1	–	4	–	0	2	–	7	–	0
St. Cloud State	0	–	5	–	0	1	–	7	–	0
$ – Conference champion

1964 Northwest Conference football standings
	Conf.					Overall
Team	W		L		T	W		L		T
No. 4 Linfield $^	5	–	0	–	0	8	–	1	–	1
Lewis & Clark	4	–	1	–	0	6	–	1	–	1
Pacific (OR)	3	–	2	–	0	5	–	3	–	0
Willamette	2	–	3	–	0	5	–	3	–	0
Whitman	1	–	4	–	0	1	–	7	–	0
College of Idaho	0	–	5	–	0	1	–	8	–	0
$ – Conference champion; ^ – NAIA playoff participant; Rankings from NAIA poll

1964 Oklahoma Collegiate Conference football standings
	Conf.					Overall
Team	W		L		T	W		L		T
No. 15 East Central $	6	–	0	–	1	9	–	2	–	1
No. 7 Northeastern State	6	–	1	–	0	9	–	1	–	0
SW Oklahoma State	4	–	2	–	1	5	–	4	–	1
SE Oklahoma State	3	–	3	–	1	4	–	5	–	1
Panhandle A&M	2	–	4	–	1	4	–	6	–	1
Central State (OK)	2	–	5	–	0	4	–	5	–	0
Langston	1	–	4	–	2	2	–	5	–	2
NW Oklahoma State	1	–	6	–	0	3	–	7	–	0
$ – Conference champion; Rankings from NAIA poll

1964 Oregon Collegiate Conference football standings
	Conf.					Overall
Team	W		L		T	W		L		T
Southern Oregon +	3	–	0	–	1	6	–	2	–	1
Portland State +	3	–	0	–	1	4	–	4	–	1
Oregon Tech	2	–	2	–	0	3	–	3	–	1
Eastern Oregon	1	–	3	–	0	3	–	4	–	0
Oregon College	0	–	4	–	0	1	–	6	–	0
+ – Conference co-champions

1964 Pennsylvania State College Athletic Conference football standings
	Conf.					Overall
Team	W		L		T	W		L		T
East Division
No. 13 East Stroudsburg xy$	6	–	0	–	0	8	–	1	–	0
West Chester	5	–	1	–	0	6	–	2	–	0
Kutztown	2	–	3	–	1	4	–	3	–	1
Mansfield	2	–	3	–	1	4	–	4	–	1
Bloomsburg	2	–	3	–	1	2	–	5	–	1
Millersville	1	–	4	–	1	3	–	4	–	1
Cheyney	0	–	4	–	2	0	–	5	–	2
West Division
Indiana (PA) xy	6	–	0	–	0	8	–	2	–	0
Clarion	3	–	2	–	1	4	–	3	–	1
Shippensburg	3	–	3	–	0	4	–	4	–	0
California (PA)	2	–	3	–	1	4	–	4	–	1
Slippery Rock	2	–	3	–	1	3	–	5	–	1
Lock Haven	2	–	4	–	0	4	–	4	–	0
Edinboro	1	–	4	–	1	2	–	5	–	1
Championship: East Stroudsburg 27, Indiana (PA) 14
$ – Conference champion; x – Division champion/co-champions; y – Championship game participant; Rankings from NAIA poll

1964 Rocky Mountain Conference football standings
	Conf.					Overall
Team	W		L		T	W		L		T
Western State (CO) $	3	–	0	–	0	9	–	1	–	0
Adams State	2	–	1	–	0	6	–	3	–	0
Colorado State–Greeley	1	–	2	–	0	4	–	5	–	0
Colorado Mines	0	–	3	–	0	0	–	9	–	0
$ – Conference champion

1964 South Dakota Intercollegiate Conference football standings
	Conf.					Overall
Team	W		L		T	W		L		T
Huron $	6	–	0	–	0	7	–	2	–	0
Northern State	5	–	1	–	0	6	–	3	–	0
Black Hills State	3	–	2	–	1	5	–	2	–	1
Dakota Wesleyan	3	–	3	–	0	5	–	3	–	1
South Dakota Tech	1	–	4	–	1	1	–	5	–	2
Southern State (SD)	1	–	5	–	0	2	–	7	–	0
General Beadle	1	–	5	–	0	1	–	7	–	0
$ – Conference champion

1964 Southern California Intercollegiate Athletic Conference football standings
	Conf.					Overall
Team	W		L		T	W		L		T
No. 8 Whittier $	4	–	0	–	0	9	–	1	–	0
Redlands	3	–	1	–	0	5	–	4	–	0
Occidental	3	–	2	–	0	5	–	4	–	0
Claremont-Mudd	2	–	3	–	0	6	–	3	–	0
Pomona	1	–	4	–	0	4	–	5	–	0
Caltech	0	–	3	–	0	1	–	6	–	0
$ – Conference champion; Rankings from NAIA poll

1964 Southwestern Athletic Conference football standings
	Conf.					Overall
Team	W		L		T	W		L		T
No. 5/2 Prairie View A&M $	7	–	0	–	0	9	–	0	–	0
No. 19/NR Grambling	6	–	1	–	0	9	–	2	–	0
Jackson State	4	–	3	–	0	6	–	4	–	0
Alcorn A&M	3	–	4	–	0	5	–	5	–	0
Arkansas AM&N	3	–	4	–	0	5	–	5	–	0
Texas Southern	3	–	4	–	0	5	–	5	–	0
Southern	2	–	5	–	0	4	–	6	–	0
Wiley	0	–	7	–	0	2	–	7	–	0
$ – Conference champion; Rankings from NAIA poll and AP small college poll

1964 Tri-State Conference football standings
	Conf.					Overall
Team	W		L		T	W		L		T
Westmar $	5	–	1	–	0	8	–	1	–	0
Northwestern (IA)	4	–	2	–	0	6	–	2	–	0
Yankton	4	–	2	–	0	5	–	4	–	0
Midland	4	–	2	–	0	4	–	4	–	0
Concordia (NE)	3	–	3	–	0	5	–	4	–	0
Dana	1	–	5	–	0	2	–	6	–	0
Sioux Falls	0	–	6	–	0	0	–	9	–	0
$ – Conference champion

1964 West Penn Conference football standings
	Conf.					Overall
Team	W		L		T	W		L		T
No. 6 Westminster (PA) $	3	–	0	–	0	8	–	0	–	0
Waynesburg	2	–	1	–	0	5	–	4	–	0
Geneva	1	–	2	–	0	1	–	6	–	1
Grove City	0	–	3	–	0	4	–	5	–	0
$ – Conference champion; Rankings from NAIA poll

1964 West Virginia Intercollegiate Athletic Conference football standings
	Conf.					Overall
Team	W		L		T	W		L		T
Fairmont State $	7	–	0	–	0	8	–	1	–	0
Bluefield State	3	–	1	–	0	5	–	2	–	0
West Virginia Wesleyan	3	–	2	–	0	4	–	4	–	0
West Virginia Tech	3	–	3	–	2	3	–	3	–	2
Salem	3	–	3	–	1	5	–	3	–	1
Shepherd	2	–	2	–	0	3	–	5	–	0
Concord	3	–	4	–	0	3	–	5	–	0
West Liberty State	3	–	5	–	0	4	–	5	–	0
Glenville State	2	–	5	–	0	2	–	6	–	0
West Virginia State	1	–	4	–	1	2	–	5	–	1
Potomac State *	0	–	1	–	0	1	–	3	–	0
$ – Conference champion; * – Did not qualify for conference standings Conference standings based on power ratings

1964 Wisconsin State University Conference football standings
	Conf.					Overall
Team	W		L		T	W		L		T
Eau Claire State $	7	–	1	–	0	7	–	2	–	0
La Crosse State	4	–	2	–	0	5	–	4	–	0
River Falls State	4	–	3	–	0	5	–	3	–	0
Whitewater State	3	–	2	–	1	3	–	5	–	1
Superior State	3	–	3	–	0	3	–	6	–	0
Oshkosh State	3	–	4	–	0	5	–	4	–	0
Stevens Point State	3	–	4	–	0	3	–	6	–	0
Stout State	2	–	5	–	0	3	–	6	–	0
Platteville State	0	–	5	–	1	1	–	5	–	2
$ – Conference champion

1964 NAIA independents football records
	Conf.			Overall
Team	W	L	T	W		L		T
No. 10 Montclair State		–		7	–	0	–	0
Earlham		–		7	–	1	–	0
No. 3 Findlay ^		–		9	–	2	–	0
Hillsdale		–		7	–	2	–	1
Austin		–		6	–	3	–	0
Carson–Newman		–		6	–	3	–	0
Cal Lutheran		–		6	–	4	–	0
Southern Colorado State		–		6	–	4	–	0
La Verne		–		5	–	4	–	0
Georgetown (KY)		–		4	–	4	–	0
New Mexico Highlands		–		4	–	4	–	0
Eastern New Mexico		–		4	–	5	–	0
Oklahoma Panhandle State		–		4	–	6	–	1
Wheaton (IL)		–		2	–	7	–	0
McMurry		–		1	–	8	–	1
St. Mary of the Plains		–		1	–	7	–	0
^ – NAIA playoff participant; Rankings from NAIA poll

== Postseason ==
Semifinals; December 5, 1964
Sam Houston State	32
Findlay*	12
Linfield	6
Concordia–Moorhead*	28

Championship; December 12, 1964; Augusta, GA
Sam Houston State	7
Concordia–Moorhead	7

== See also ==
- 1964 NCAA University Division football season
- 1964 NCAA College Division football season
