= List of Sam Houston State Bearkats football seasons =

This is a list of seasons completed by the Sam Houston Bearkats football team. The Bearkats compete in the NCAA Division I Football Bowl Subdivision (FBS) as a member of Conference USA. Sam Houston's first football team was fielded in 1912. The team plays its home games at the 12,593-seat Bowers Stadium in Huntsville, Texas.

Sam Houston has two national championships in their history, the first coming in 1964 as a member of the NAIA. The most recent title was in the 2021 spring season when Sam Houston defeated South Dakota State 23–21 in the NCAA Division I FCS national championship game.

The head coach of the Bearkats is Phil Longo, who has led the team since 2025. The Bearkats were members of FCS (formerly I-AA) from 1984 to 2022, before moving up to join the FBS in 2023.

== Seasons ==
Legend

† National champions
^{†} Conference champions
^ Bowl game berth / playoff result

List of Sam Houston Bearkats football seasons
Season	Team	Head coach	Conference	Regular season results							Postseason results	Final ranking	
Season	Team	Head coach	Conference	Overall			Conference				Bowl game/Playoff result	AP/NCAA Poll	Coaches' Poll
Season	Team	Head coach	Conference	Win	Loss	Tie	Win	Loss	Tie	Finish	Bowl game/Playoff result	AP/NCAA Poll	Coaches' Poll
Sam Houston Normal
1912	1912	S. R. Warner	Independent	2	2	0					—	—	—
1913	1913	S. R. Warner	Independent	3	1	1					—	—	—
1914	1914	Gene Berry	Independent	3	2	0					—	—	—
1915	1915	Gene Berry	Independent	5	1	1					—	—	—
1916	1916	Gene Berry	Independent	5	2	0					—	—	—
1917	1917	Gene Berry	Independent	1	3	0					—	—	—
1918		Gene Berry	Independent	No team due to World War I									
1919	1919	Gene Berry	Independent	0	7	0					—	—	—
1920	1920	Mutt Gee	Independent	1	3	2					—	—	—
Sam Houston Normal Bear Cats
1921	1921	Mutt Gee	Independent	3	1	2					—	—	—
1922	1922	Mutt Gee	Independent	2	3	0					—	—	—
Sam Houston State Bearkats
1923	1923	J. W. Jones	Independent	4	4	0					—	—	—
1924	1924	J. W. Jones	TIAA	2	5	1	2	3	1	4th	—	—	—
1925	1925	J. W. Jones	TIAA	5	4	0	2	4	0	5th	—	—	—
1926	1926	J. W. Jones	TIAA	5	2	1	4	1	0	2nd	—	—	—
1927	1927	J. W. Jones	TIAA	4	4	1	3	2	1	3rd	—	—	—
1928	1928	J. W. Jones	TIAA	5	5	1	5	3	0	4th	—	—	—
1929	1929	J. W. Jones	TIAA	5	3	1	3	1	1	3rd	—	—	—
1930	1930^{†}	J. W. Jones	TIAA	9	1	0	5	0	0	1st^{†}	—	—	—
1931	1931	J. W. Jones	TIAA	4	5	0	3	2	0	4th	—	—	—
1932	1932	J. W. Jones	Lone Star	2	5	1	1	3	0	3rd	—	—	—
1933	1933	J. W. Jones	Lone Star	3	4	2	1	2	2	5th	—	—	—
1934	1934	J. W. Jones	Lone Star	3	4	2	2	3	0	4th	—	—	—
1935	1935	J. W. Jones	Lone Star	3	6	0	0	5	0	6th	—	—	—
1936	1936	Henry O. Crawford	Lone Star	2	7	0	1	4	0	5th	—	—	—
1937	1937	Henry O. Crawford	Lone Star	5	5	0	3	3	0	4th	—	—	—
1938	1938	Puny Wilson	Lone Star	8	2	0	5	1	0	2nd	—	—	—
1939	1939	Puny Wilson	Lone Star	6	2	2	4	1	1	2nd	—	—	—
1940	1940	Puny Wilson	Lone Star	8	2	0	5	1	0	2nd	—	—	—
1941	1941	Puny Wilson	Lone Star	2	7	1	2	3	0	4th	—	—	—
1942	1942	Puny Wilson	Lone Star	5	3	0	3	1	0	2nd	—	—	—
1943		Puny Wilson	Lone Star	No team due to World War II									
1944		Puny Wilson	Lone Star	No team due to World War II									
1945		Puny Wilson	Lone Star	No team due to World War II									
1946	1946	Puny Wilson	Lone Star	6	2	1	3	1	1	2nd	—	—	—
1947	1947	Puny Wilson	Lone Star	3	6	0	1	4	0	5th	—	—	—
1948	1948	Puny Wilson	Lone Star	0	9	1	0	4	0	5th	—	—	—
1949	1949	Puny Wilson	Lone Star	3	7	0	0	4	0	5th	—	—	—
1950	1950	Puny Wilson	Lone Star	5	5	0	2	2	0	3rd	—	—	—
1951	1951	Puny Wilson	Lone Star	4	4	1	1	2	1	3rd	—	—	—
1952	1952	Paul Pierce	Lone Star	6	4	0	3	2	0	3rd	Won 1952 Shrimp Bowl vs. Northeastern State (OK), 41–20 ^	—	—
1953	1953	Paul Pierce	Lone Star	9	1	0	4	1	0	2nd	Won 1953 Refrigerator Bowl vs. College of Idaho, 14–12 ^	—	—
1954	1954	Paul Pierce	Lone Star	6	4	0	2	3	0	4th	—	—	—
1955	1955^{†}	Paul Pierce	Lone Star	6	1	2	4	1	1	1st^{†}	—	—	—
1956 (Note: Sam Houston State was classified as an NAIA program, which began sponsoring football in 1956.)	1956^{†}	Paul Pierce	Lone Star	10	0	0	6	0	0	1st^{†}	Won 1956 Refrigerator Bowl vs. Middle Tennessee State, 27–13 ^	—	—
1957	1957	Paul Pierce	Lone Star	3	5	1	2	3	1	4th	—	—	—
1958	1958	Paul Pierce	Lone Star	7	3	0	4	2	0	2nd	Lost 1958 Christmas Festival Bowl vs. Northwestern State, 11–18 ^	—	—
1959	1959	Paul Pierce	Lone Star	5	5	0	3	4	0	5th	—	—	—
1960	1960	Paul Pierce	Lone Star	3	6	0	2	5	0	6th	—	—	—
1961	1961^{†}	Paul Pierce	Lone Star	8	1	0	7	0		1st^{†}	—	—	—
1962	1962	Paul Pierce	Lone Star	5	3	1	4	2	1	3rd	—	—	—
1963	1963	Paul Pierce	Lone Star	4	3	1	2	3	1	4th	—	—	—
1964	1964†	Paul Pierce	Lone Star	9	1	1	5	1	0	1st^{†}	Tied 1964 Championship Bowl vs. Concordia, 7–7 ^	2	9
1965	1965	Paul Pierce	Lone Star	4	6	0	1	5	0	6th	—	—	—
1966	1966	Paul Pierce	Lone Star	6	3	1	4	2	1	3rd	—	—	—
1967	1967	Paul Pierce	Lone Star	3	6	0	1	6	0	7th	—	—	—
1968	1968	Tom Page	Lone Star	5	4	1	4	3	1	4th	—	—	—
1969	1969	Tom Page	Lone Star	3	6	1	3	4	1	4th	—	—	—
1970	1970	Tom Page	Lone Star	8	2	1	7	2	0	2nd	—	T-20 (Note: Ranking from the 1970 small college poll.)	—
1971	1971	Tom Page	Lone Star	4	7	0	3	6	0	5th	—	—	—
1972	1972	Allen Boren	Lone Star	5	6	0	4	4	0	4th	—	—	—
1973	1973	Allen Boren	Lone Star	2	8	0	2	7	0	7th	—	—	—
1974	1974	Billy Tidwell	Lone Star	4	7	0	4	5	0	5th	—	—	—
1975	1975	Billy Tidwell	Lone Star	3	8	0	3	6	0	6th	—	—	—
1976	1976	Billy Tidwell	Lone Star	3	5	1	2	5	0	6th	—	—	—
1977	1977	Billy Tidwell	Lone Star	1	10	0	1	6	0	7th	—	—	—
1978	1978	Melvin Brown	Lone Star	6	5	0	4	3	0	3rd	—	—	—
1979	1979	Melvin Brown	Lone Star	1	9	0	0	7	0	8th	—	—	—
1980	1980	Melvin Brown	Lone Star	3	7	0	2	5	0	6th	—	—	—
1981	1981	Melvin Brown	Lone Star	2	8	0	2	5	0	6th	—	—	—
1982 (Note: Sam Houston State joined the NCAA in 1982 as a Division II program.)	1982	Ron Randleman	Lone Star	3	8	0	1	5	0	8th	—	—	—
1983	1983	Ron Randleman	Lone Star	4	7	0	1	6	0	7th	—	—	—
1984 (Note: The Bearkats moved up to NCAA Division I-AA (now FCS) status in 1984.)	1984	Ron Randleman	Gulf Star	8	3	0	3	2	0	2nd	—	—	—
1985	1985^{†}	Ron Randleman	Gulf Star	8	3	0	4	1	0	1st^{†}	—	—	—
1986	1986^{†}	Ron Randleman	Gulf Star	9	3	0	3	1	0	1st^{†}	NCAA Division I-AA Playoffs — First Round ^	11	—
1987	1987	Ron Randleman	Southland	8	3	0	5	1	0	2nd	–	19	—
1988	1988	Ron Randleman	Southland	3	8	0	0	6	0	7th	—	—	—
1989	1989	Ron Randleman	Southland	3	8	0	2	4	0	5th	—	—	—
1990	1990	Ron Randleman	Southland	4	7	0	3	3	0	3rd	—	—	—
1991	1991^{†}	Ron Randleman	Southland	8	3	1	5	2	0	1st^{†}	NCAA Division I-AA Playoffs — First Round ^	12	—
1992	1992	Ron Randleman	Southland	6	3	2	3	3	1	3rd	—	—	—
1993	1993	Ron Randleman	Southland	4	7	0	2	5	0	5th	—	—	—
1994	1994	Ron Randleman	Southland	6	5	0	1	5	0	5th	—	—	—
1995	1995	Ron Randleman	Southland	5	5	0	2	3	0	3rd	—	—	—
1996 (Note: Overtime rules were added for NCAA football in 1996, thereby eliminating ties.)	1996	Ron Randleman	Southland	4	7		3	3		3rd	—	—	—
1997	1997	Ron Randleman	Southland	5	6		3	4		4th	—	—	—
1998	1998	Ron Randleman	Southland	3	8		1	6		8th	—	—	—
1999	1999	Ron Randleman	Southland	6	5		4	3		4th	—	—	—
2000	2000	Ron Randleman	Southland	7	4		4	3		4th	—	—	—
2001	2001^{†}	Ron Randleman	Southland	10	3		5	1		1st^{†}	NCAA Division I-AA Playoffs — Quarterfinals ^	7	—
2002	2002	Ron Randleman	Southland	4	7		2	4		5th	—	—	—
2003	2003	Ron Randleman	Southland	2	9		1	4		4th	—	—	—
2004	2004^{†}	Ron Randleman	Southland	11	3		4	1		1st^{†}	NCAA Division I-AA Playoffs — Semifinals ^	4	—
2005	2005	Todd Whitten	Southland	3	7		2	4		5th	—	—	—
2006	2006	Todd Whitten	Southland	6	5		4	2		2nd	—	—	—
2007	2007	Todd Whitten	Southland	7	4		5	2		2nd	—	—	—
2008	2008	Todd Whitten	Southland	4	6		2	5		6th	—	—	—
2009	2009	Todd Whitten	Southland	5	6		2	4		5th	—	—	—
2010	2010	Willie Fritz	Southland	6	5		4	3		3rd	—	—	—
2011	2011^{†}	Willie Fritz	Southland	14	1		7	0		1st^{†}	NCAA Division I FCS Playoffs – National Championship Game ^	2	2
2012	2012^{†}	Willie Fritz	Southland	11	4		6	1		1st^{†}	NCAA Division I FCS Playoffs – National Championship Game ^	2	2
2013	2013	Willie Fritz	Southland	9	5		4	3		3rd	NCAA Division I FCS Playoffs — Second Round ^	14	13
2014	2014^{†}	K. C. Keeler	Southland	11	5		7	1		1st^{†}	NCAA Division I FCS Playoffs – Semifinals ^	6	6
2015	2015	K. C. Keeler	Southland	11	4		7	2		2nd	NCAA Division I FCS Playoffs — Semifinals ^	3	4
2016	2016^{†}	K. C. Keeler	Southland	12	1		9	0		1st^{†}	NCAA Division I FCS Playoffs — Quarterfinals ^	5	5
2017	2017	K. C. Keeler	Southland	12	2		8	1		2nd	NCAA Division I FCS Playoffs — Semifinals ^	4	3
2018	2018	K. C. Keeler	Southland	6	5		5	4		4th	—	—	—
2019	2019	K. C. Keeler	Southland	7	5		6	3		4th	—	—	—
2020 (Note: The Fall 2020 Southland football season was delayed due to the COVID-19 pandemic, with league play resuming in a shortened Spring 2021 season.)	2020†	K. C. Keeler	Southland	10	0		6	0		1st^{†}	NCAA Division I FCS Playoffs — Champions †	1	1
Sam Houston Bearkats
2021	2021^{†}	K.C. Keeler	WAC	11	1		5	0		1st^{†}	NCAA Division I FCS Playoffs — Quarterfinals ^	5	4
2022 (Note: Sam Houston was ineligible for the WAC championship and FCS postseason due to their FBS transition. They played a WAC schedule but their games did not count in the conference standings.)	2022	K.C. Keeler	WAC	5	4		0	0		3rd	—	—	—
2023 (Note: Sam Houston moved up to the Division I FBS ranks in 2023 as a member of Conference USA.)	2023	K.C. Keeler	C-USA	3	9		2	6		T–6th	—	—	—
2024	2024	K.C. Keeler	C-USA	10	3		6	2		T–2nd	Won New Orleans Bowl vs. Georgia Southern, 31–26 ^	—	—
2025	2025	Phil Longo	C-USA	2	10		1	7		T–11th	—	—	
2026	2026	Phil Longo	C-USA	0	1		0	0			—	—	—
Totals				All-time: 576–501–36 (.534)			Conference: 316–295–16 (.517)				Postseason: 29–13–1 (.686)		
