= 1964 college football season =

1964 college football season may refer to:

- 1964 NCAA University Division football season
- 1964 NCAA College Division football season
- 1964 NAIA football season
