= 1964 Tennessee A&I Tigers football team =

American college football season

1964 Tennessee A&I Tigers football

MWAA champion
- Conference: Midwest Athletic Association
- Record: 8–2 (3–0 MWAA)
- Head coach: John Merritt (2nd season)
- Home stadium: Hale Stadium

1964 Midwest Athletic Association football standings
	Conf.					Overall
Team	W		L		T	W		L		T
No. 4 Tennessee A&I $	3	–	0	–	0	8	–	2	–	0
No. 5 Lincoln (MO)	2	–	1	–	0	8	–	2	–	0
No. 17 Kentucky State	1	–	2	–	0	7	–	3	–	0
Central State (OH)	0	–	3	–	0	3	–	5	–	0
$ – Conference champion; Rankings from Pittsburgh Courier

The 1964 Tennessee A&I Tigers football team represented Tennessee Agricultural & Industrial State College (now known as Tennessee State University) as a member of the Midwest Athletic Association (MWAA) during the 1964 NCAA College Division football season. Led by second-year head coach John Merritt, the Tigers compiled an overall record of 8–2, with a 3–0 conference record, and finished as MWAA champion.

== Schedule ==
Date	Opponent	Site	Result	Attendance	Source
September 19	Fort Campbell*	Hale Stadium; Nashville, TN	W 32–26		
September 26	at North Carolina A&T*	World War Memorial Stadium; Greensboro, NC	W 60–6	6,000	
October 3	Morris Brown*	Hale Stadium; Nashville, TN	W 35–0	7,000	
October 10	at Grambling*	Grambling Stadium; Grambling, LA	L 18–20	8,500	
October 17	at Central State (OH)	McPherson Stadium; Wilberforce, OH	W 61–8	8,000	
October 24	at No. 2 Florida A&M*	Bragg Memorial Stadium; Tallahassee, FL	L 20–22	11,000	
October 31	Southern*	Hale Stadium; Nashville, TN	W 32–21	9,500	
November 7	Fort Knox*	Hale Stadium; Nashville, TN	W 58–7	4,000	
November 14	Lincoln (MO)	Hale Stadium; Nashville, TN	W 31–13	9,000	
November 26	Kentucky State^{†}	Hale Stadium; Nashville, TN	W 31–30	8,700	
*Non-conference game; ^{†}Homecoming; Rankings from AP Poll released prior to the game
