= 1964 East Texas State Lions football team =

American college football season

1964 East Texas State Lions football
- Conference: Lone Star Conference
- Record: 2–7 (1–5 LSC)
- Head coach: Ernest Hawkins (1st season)
- Home stadium: Memorial Stadium

1964 Lone Star Conference football standings
	Conf.					Overall
Team	W		L		T	W		L		T
No. 2/10 Sam Houston State $^	5	–	1	–	0	9	–	1	–	1
No. 14/NR Sul Ross	4	–	1	–	1	7	–	3	–	1
Southwest Texas State	4	–	2	–	0	7	–	2	–	0
Texas A&I	3	–	2	–	1	7	–	2	–	1
Stephen F. Austin	3	–	3	–	0	4	–	5	–	0
East Texas State	1	–	5	–	0	2	–	7	–	0
Howard Payne	0	–	6	–	0	2	–	8	–	0
$ – Conference champion; ^ – NAIA playoff participant; Rankings from NAIA poll and AP small college poll

The 1964 East Texas State Lions football team represented East Texas State College—now known as Texas A&M University–Commerce—as a member of the Lone Star Conference (LSC) during the 1964 NAIA football season. Led by first-year head coach Ernest Hawkins, the Lions compiled an overall record of 2–7 with a mark of 1–5 in conference play, placing sixth in the LSC. Hawkins had taken over the program after the sudden death of Jules V. Sikes in the spring of 1964. The team played their home games at Memorial Stadium in Commerce, Texas.

== Schedule ==
Date	Opponent	Site	Result	Attendance	Source
September 19	at Abilene Christian*	Shotwell Stadium; Abilene, TX	L 11–17	8,000–10,000	
September 26	Southeastern Louisiana*	Memorial Stadium; Commerce, TX	W 22–8		
October 3	at No. 7 Louisiana Tech*	Tech Stadium; Ruston, LA	L 7–15	7,500	
October 17	Texas A&I	Memorial Stadium; Commerce, TX	L 9–20		
October 24	at Sul Ross	Jackson Field; Alpine, TX	L 15–27		
October 31	Howard Payne	Memorial Stadium; Commerce, TX	W 28–14		
November 7	at Sam Houston State	Pritchett Field; Huntsville, TX	L 0–6	8,500	
November 14	Southwest Texas State	Memorial Stadium; Commerce, TX	L 0–52	4,500	
November 21	at Stephen F. Austin	Memorial Stadium; Nacogdoches, TX	L 20–28		
*Non-conference game; Rankings from AP Poll released prior to the game

== Postseason awards ==
=== All-Americans ===
- Fred Polser, Defensive Tackle, Second Team

=== All-Lone Star Conference ===
==== LSC First Team ====
- Fred Polser, Defensive Tackle

==== LSC Second Team ====
- Charles Neuman, Offensive Line

==== LSC Honorable Mention ====
- John Stooksberry, Quarterback
- Gayhart Jeanis, Safety
