= 2013 NCAA Division I Football Championship Game =

Postseason college football game

2013 NCAA Division I Football Championship
- FCS National Championship Game
North Dakota State Bison	Sam Houston State Bearkats
(13–1)	(11–3)
MVFC	Southland
39	13
Head coach: Craig Bohl	Head coach: Willie Fritz
TSN / Seed; 1 / 1	TSN / Seed; 5 / —
	1	2	3	4	Total
North Dakota State	3	7	15	14	39
Sam Houston State	0	10	0	3	13
- Date: January 5, 2013
- Season: 2012
- Stadium: FC Dallas Stadium
- Location: Frisco, Texas
- MVP: Brock Jensen (QB, North Dakota State)
- Favorite: North Dakota State by 1.5
- Referee: Gregg Wilson (Big Sky)
- Attendance: 21,411

United States TV coverage
- Network: ESPN2
- Announcers: Dave Neal (play-by-play), Jay Walker (color), Cara Capuano (sideline)

The 2013 NCAA Division I Football Championship Game was a postseason college football game between the North Dakota State Bison and the Sam Houston State Bearkats. It was played on January 5, 2013, at FC Dallas Stadium in Frisco, Texas. The culminating game of the 2012 NCAA Division I FCS football season, it was won by North Dakota State, 39–13.

With sponsorship by Enterprise Rent-A-Car, the game was officially known as the NCAA FCS Championship presented by Enterprise Rent-A-Car. The contest was a rematch of the prior season's championship game, which was also won by North Dakota State.

== Teams ==
The participants of the Championship Game were the finalists of the 2012 FCS Playoffs, which began with a 20-team bracket.

=== North Dakota State Bison ===
North Dakota State finished their regular season with a 10–1 record (7–1 in conference), including a win over Colorado State of the FBS. As the first-seed in the tournament, the Bison defeated South Dakota State, Wofford, and fifth-seed Georgia Southern to reach the final. This was North Dakota State's second appearance in an FCS/Division I-AA title game, having won the prior season's title game over Sam Houston State.

=== Sam Houston State Bearkats ===
Sam Houston State finished their regular season with an 8–3 record (6–1 in conference). Two of their losses were to FBS teams; Baylor and Texas A&M. Unseeded in the tournament, the Bearkats defeated Cal Poly, third-seed Montana State, and second-seed Eastern Washington to reach the final. This was also Sam Houston State's second appearance in an FCS/Division I-AA championship game, having lost the prior season's title game to North Dakota State.

== Game summary ==
Both teams scored a field goal and touchdown in the first half, for a 10–10 score at halftime. The Bearkats appeared to take the lead on a 41-yard run by Timothy Flanders early in the third quarter, but the score was negated by a holding penalty. The Bison went on to score four second-half touchdowns, while holding the Bearkats to a single field goal. The 39–13 final score gave the Bison their second FCS championship.

=== Scoring summary ===
Scoring summary

Quarter	Time	Drive			Team	Scoring information	Score	
Quarter	Time	Plays	Yards	TOP	Team	Scoring information	NSDU	SHSU
1	3:49	5	65	2:37	NDSU	32-yard field goal by Adam Keller	3	0
2	14:18	11	55	4:31	SHSU	38-yard field goal by Miguel Antonio	3	3
2	3:09	5	72	2:19	NDSU	Brock Jensen 20-yard touchdown run, Keller kick good	10	3
2	0:33	9	75	2:36	SHSU	K. J. Williams 1-yard touchdown reception from Brian Bell, Antonio kick good	10	10
3	8:30	10	60	4:29	NDSU	Jensen 1-yard touchdown run, Keller kick good	17	10
3	2:08	6	65	2:41	NDSU	Sam Ojuri 2-yard touchdown run, 2-point pass good (Keller to Mike Hardie)	25	10
4	13:20	10	50	3:48	SHSU	32-yard field goal by Antonio	25	13
4	10:13	6	65	3:07	NDSU	Jensen 1-yard touchdown run, Keller kick good	32	13
4	6:00	4	30	2:11	NDSU	Ojuri 11-yard touchdown run, Keller kick good	39	13
"TOP" = time of possession. For other American football terms, see Glossary of American football.							39	13

=== Game statistics ===
	1	2	3	4	Total
No. 1 Bison	3	7	15	14	39
Bearkats	0	10	0	3	13

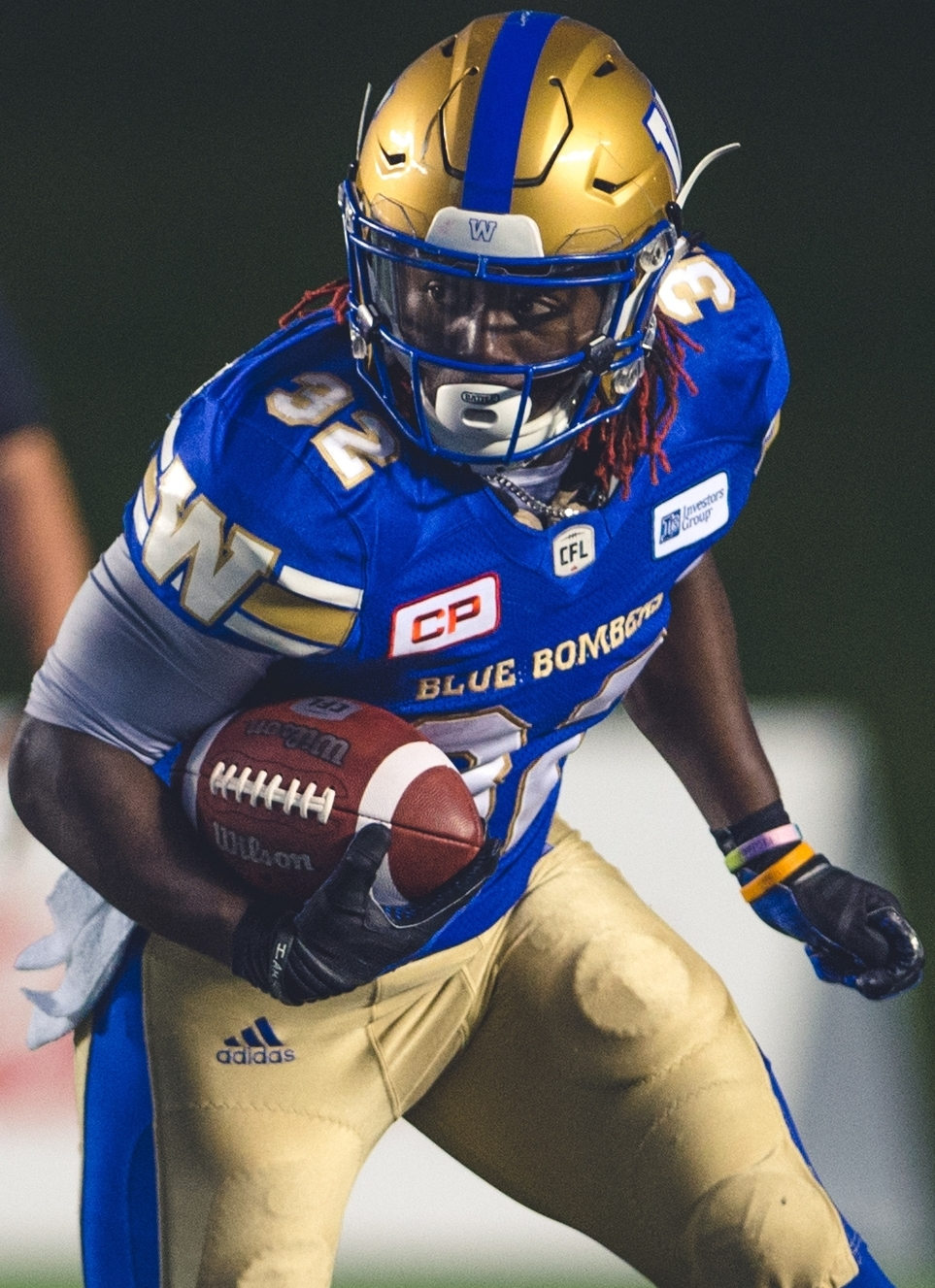
Sam Houston State running back Timothy Flanders

Statistics	NDSU	SHSU
First downs	22	23
Plays–yards	62–441	73–391
Rushes–yards	45–300	38–116
Passing yards	141	275
Passing: comp–att–int	10–17–0	20–35–4
Time of possession	30:13	29:47

Team	Category	Player	Statistics
North Dakota State	Passing	Brock Jensen	9–16, 115 yds
North Dakota State	Rushing	Sam Ojuri	14 car, 92 yds, 2 TD
North Dakota State	Receiving	Kevin Vaadeland	2 rec, 34 yds
Sam Houston State	Passing	Brian Bell	19–33, 255 yds, 1 TD, 3 INT
Sam Houston State	Rushing	Timothy Flanders	19 car, 53 yds
Sam Houston State	Receiving	Richard Sincere	4 rec, 83 yds
