= 1964 Prairie View A&M Panthers football team =

American college football season

1964 Prairie View A&M Panthers football

Black college national champion SWAC champion
- Conference: Southwestern Athletic Conference

Ranking
- Coaches: No. 8 (UPI College Division)
- AP: No. 2 (AP College Division)
- Record: 9–0 (7–0 SWAC)
- Head coach: Billy Nicks (16th season)

1964 Southwestern Athletic Conference football standings
	Conf.					Overall
Team	W		L		T	W		L		T
No. 5/2 Prairie View A&M $	7	–	0	–	0	9	–	0	–	0
No. 19/NR Grambling	6	–	1	–	0	9	–	2	–	0
Jackson State	4	–	3	–	0	6	–	4	–	0
Alcorn A&M	3	–	4	–	0	5	–	5	–	0
Arkansas AM&N	3	–	4	–	0	5	–	5	–	0
Texas Southern	3	–	4	–	0	5	–	5	–	0
Southern	2	–	5	–	0	4	–	6	–	0
Wiley	0	–	7	–	0	2	–	7	–	0
$ – Conference champion; Rankings from NAIA poll and AP small college poll

The 1964 Prairie View A&M Panthers football team was an American football team that represented Prairie View A&M University in the Southwestern Athletic Conference (SWAC) during the 1964 NCAA College Division football season. In their 16th season under head coach Billy Nicks, the Panthers compiled a perfect 9–0 record, won the SWAC championship, and outscored opponents by a total of 303 to 110.

The Pittsburgh Courier selected Prairie View as the 1964 black college football national champion with a rating of 25.71, ahead of second-place Grambling with a 24.14 rating and third-place Florida A&M with a 23.29 rating. Prairie View was also ranked No. 2 in the final AP small college poll and No. 8 in the final United Press International poll.

At the end of the 1964 season, the Pittsburgh Courier selected Prairie View's Billy Nicks as the national Coach of the Year and quarterback Jimmy Kearney as the Back of the Year. Another key player was end Otis Taylor who later played 11 seasons for the Kansas City Chiefs.

== Schedule ==
Date	Opponent	Rank	Site	Result	Attendance	Source
September 11	at Lackland Air Force Base		Warhawk Field; San Antonio, TX	W 27–16		
September 19	at Jackson State		Alumni Field; Jackson, MS	W 36–13		
October 3	Grambling		Blackshear Stadium; Prairie View, TX	W 22–14		
October 10	at Texas Southern	No. 4	Jeppesen Stadium; Houston, TX	W 16–13		
October 19	vs. Wiley	No. 5	Dallas, TX (State Fair Classic)	W 39–13	5,000	
October 24	Arkansas AM&N	No. 3	Blackshear Stadium; Prairie View, TX	W 31–13		
November 7	at Bishop	No. 2	Dallas, TX	W 28–14		
November 14	Alcorn A&M^{†}	No. 4	Blackshear Stadium; Prairie View, TX	W 44–0	10,000	
November 21	Southern	No. 2	Blackshear Stadium; Prairie View, TX	W 60–14		
^{†}Homecoming; Rankings from AP Poll released prior to the game
