= 1964 Southwest Texas State Bobcats football team =

American college football season

1964 Southwest Texas State Bobcats football
- Conference: Lone Star Conference
- Record: 8–2 (4–2 LSC)
- Head coach: Milton Jowers (7th season)
- Home stadium: Evans Field

1964 Lone Star Conference football standings
	Conf.					Overall
Team	W		L		T	W		L		T
No. 2/10 Sam Houston State $^	5	–	1	–	0	9	–	1	–	1
No. 14/NR Sul Ross	4	–	1	–	1	7	–	3	–	1
Southwest Texas State	4	–	2	–	0	7	–	2	–	0
Texas A&I	3	–	2	–	1	7	–	2	–	1
Stephen F. Austin	3	–	3	–	0	4	–	5	–	0
East Texas State	1	–	5	–	0	2	–	7	–	0
Howard Payne	0	–	6	–	0	2	–	8	–	0
$ – Conference champion; ^ – NAIA playoff participant; Rankings from NAIA poll and AP small college poll

The 1964 Southwest Texas State Bobcats football team was an American football team that represented Southwest Texas State College (now known as Texas State University) during the 1964 NAIA football season as a member of the Lone Star Conference (LSC). In their seventh year under head coach Milton Jowers, the team compiled an overall record of 8–2 with a mark of 4–2 in conference play.

== Schedule ==
Date	Opponent	Rank	Site	Result	Attendance	Source
September 19	Texas Lutheran*		Evans Field; San Marcos, TX	W 14–3	4,000	
September 26	at Trinity (TX)*		Alamo Stadium; San Antonio, TX	W 20–7	4,061–4,134	
October 3	at Sul Ross	No. 6	Jackson Field; Alpine, TX	L 14–16	4,000	
October 10	at McMurry*		Shotwell Stadium; Abilene, TX	W 42–8	1,200	
October 17	Howard Payne		Evans Field; San Marcos, TX	W 35–12	4,500	
October 24	Sam Houston State		Pritchett Field; Huntsville, TX (rivalry)	L 14–15	5,000–6,500	
October 31	Lackland Air Force Base*		Evans Field; San Marcos, TX	W 48–21		
November 7	Stephen F. Austin		Evans Field; San Marcos, TX	W 21–15	8,000	
November 14	at East Texas State		Memorial Stadium; Commerce, TX	W 52–0	4,500	
November 21	No. 10 Texas A&I		Evans Field; San Marcos, TX	W 21–6	7,600	
*Non-conference game; Rankings from AP Poll released prior to the game
