= 1964 Southern Jaguars football team =

American college football season

1964 Southern Jaguars football
- Conference: Southwestern Athletic Conference
- Record: 4–6 (2–5 SWAC)
- Head coach: Robert Henry Lee (3rd season)
- Home stadium: University Stadium

1964 Southwestern Athletic Conference football standings
	Conf.					Overall
Team	W		L		T	W		L		T
No. 5/2 Prairie View A&M $	7	–	0	–	0	9	–	0	–	0
No. 19/NR Grambling	6	–	1	–	0	9	–	2	–	0
Jackson State	4	–	3	–	0	6	–	4	–	0
Alcorn A&M	3	–	4	–	0	5	–	5	–	0
Arkansas AM&N	3	–	4	–	0	5	–	5	–	0
Texas Southern	3	–	4	–	0	5	–	5	–	0
Southern	2	–	5	–	0	4	–	6	–	0
Wiley	0	–	7	–	0	2	–	7	–	0
$ – Conference champion; Rankings from NAIA poll and AP small college poll

The 1964 Southern Jaguars football team was an American football team that represented Southern University as a member of the Southwestern Athletic Conference (SWAC) during the 1964 NCAA College Division football season. Led by Robert Henry Lee in his third season as head coach, the Jaguars compiled an overall record of 4–6, with a mark of 2–5 in conference play, and finished seventh in the SWAC.

== Schedule ==
Date	Opponent	Site	Result	Attendance	Source
September 19	vs. Texas Southern	Public School Stadium; Galveston, TX	W 7–6		
September 26	Grambling	University Stadium; Baton Rouge, LA (rivalry)	L 17–20	26,000	
October 10	at Arkansas AM&N	Pumphrey Stadium; Pine Bluff, AR	L 0–14	2,969	
October 17	Jackson State	University Stadium; Baton Rouge, LA (rivalry)	L 0–9	11,000	
October 24	at Alcorn A&M	Henderson Stadium; Lorman, MS	L 3–21		
October 31	at Tennessee A&I*	Hale Stadium; Nashville, TN	L 21–32		
November 7	Wiley	University Stadium; Baton Rouge, LA	W 39–13		
November 14	Florida A&M*	University Stadium; Baton Rouge, LA	W 43–20		
November 21	at Prairie View A&M	Edward L. Blackshear Field; Prairie View, TX	L 14–60		
December 5	at Dillard*	Alumni Stadium; New Orleans, LA	W 34–8	4,000	
*Non-conference game
