= 1964 Arkansas AM&N Golden Lions football team =

American college football season

1964 Arkansas AM&N Golden Lions football
- Conference: Southwestern Athletic Conference
- Record: 5–5 (3–4 SWAC)
- Head coach: Vannette W. Johnson (3rd season)
- Home stadium: Pumphrey Stadium

1964 Southwestern Athletic Conference football standings
	Conf.					Overall
Team	W		L		T	W		L		T
No. 5/2 Prairie View A&M $	7	–	0	–	0	9	–	0	–	0
No. 19/NR Grambling	6	–	1	–	0	9	–	2	–	0
Jackson State	4	–	3	–	0	6	–	4	–	0
Alcorn A&M	3	–	4	–	0	5	–	5	–	0
Arkansas AM&N	3	–	4	–	0	5	–	5	–	0
Texas Southern	3	–	4	–	0	5	–	5	–	0
Southern	2	–	5	–	0	4	–	6	–	0
Wiley	0	–	7	–	0	2	–	7	–	0
$ – Conference champion; Rankings from NAIA poll and AP small college poll

The 1964 Arkansas AM&N Golden Lions football team represented the Arkansas Agricultural, Mechanical and Normal College (now known as the University of Arkansas at Pine Bluff) as a member of the Southwestern Athletic Conference (SWAC) during the 1964 NCAA College Division football season. Led by third-year head coach Vannette W. Johnson, the Golden Lions compiled an overall record of 5–5, with a conference record of 3–4, and finished tied for fourth in the SWAC.

== Schedule ==
Date	Opponent	Site	Result	Attendance	Source
September 19	Mississippi Valley State*	Pumphrey Stadium; Pine Bluff, AR	W 12–6	3,563	
September 26	at Lincoln (MO)*	Lincoln Field; Jefferson City, MO	L 8–25	1,500	
October 3	at Jackson State	Alumni Field; Jackson, MS	L 12–14	4,350	
October 10	Southern	Pumphrey Stadium; Pine Bluff, AR	W 14–0	2,969	
October 17	Fort Hood*	Pumphrey Stadium; Pine Bluff, AR	W 20–15	3,200	
October 24	at No. 3 Prairie View A&M	Edward L. Blackshear Field; Prairie View, TX	L 13–31	3,000	
October 31	Alcorn A&M	Pumphrey Stadium; Pine Bluff, AR	W 28–0	6,248	
November 7	at Grambling	Grambling Stadium; Grambling, LA	L 0–39	3,000	
November 14	Texas Southern	Pumphrey Stadium; Pine Bluff, AR	L 14–21	2,196	
November 21	at Wiley	Wiley Field; Marshall, TX	W 48–0	700	
*Non-conference game; Rankings from AP Poll released prior to the game
