= 1964 Jackson State Tigers football team =

American college football season

1964 Jackson State Tigers football
- Conference: Southwestern Athletic Conference
- Record: 6–4 (4–3 SWAC)
- Head coach: Rod Paige (1st season)
- Home stadium: Alumni Field

1964 Southwestern Athletic Conference football standings
	Conf.					Overall
Team	W		L		T	W		L		T
No. 5/2 Prairie View A&M $	7	–	0	–	0	9	–	0	–	0
No. 19/NR Grambling	6	–	1	–	0	9	–	2	–	0
Jackson State	4	–	3	–	0	6	–	4	–	0
Alcorn A&M	3	–	4	–	0	5	–	5	–	0
Arkansas AM&N	3	–	4	–	0	5	–	5	–	0
Texas Southern	3	–	4	–	0	5	–	5	–	0
Southern	2	–	5	–	0	4	–	6	–	0
Wiley	0	–	7	–	0	2	–	7	–	0
$ – Conference champion; Rankings from NAIA poll and AP small college poll

The 1964 Jackson State Tigers football team represented Jackson College for Negro Teachers (now known as Jackson State University) as a member of the Southwestern Athletic Conference (SWAC) during the 1964 NCAA College Division football season. Led by first-year head coach Rod Paige, the Tigers compiled an overall record of 6–4, with a conference record of 4–3, and finished third in the SWAC.

== Schedule ==
Date	Opponent	Site	Result	Attendance	Source
September 12	at Fort Benning*	Doughboy Stadium; Columbus, GA	L 20–42	9,250	
September 19	Prairie View A&M	Alumni Field; Jackson, MS	L 13–36	4,350	
September 26	Mississippi Valley State*	Alumni Field; Jackson, MS	W 11–9	5,275	
October 3	Arkansas AM&N	Alumni Field; Jackson, MS	W 14–12	4,350	
October 10	at Alcorn A&M	Henderson Stadium; Lorman, MS	L 8–27	4,000	
October 17	at Southern	University Stadium; Baton Rouge, LA (rivalry)	W 9–0	11,000	
October 24	at Grambling	Grambling Stadium; Grambling, LA	L 26–47	5,600	
October 31	at Wiley	Wildcat Stadium; Marshall, TX	W 20–14	2,500	
November 7	Texas Southern	Alumni Field; Jackson, MS	W 24–0	5,300	
November 14	at Mississippi Industrial*	Holly Springs, MS	W 56–0	2,000	
*Non-conference game
