= 1964 Texas Southern Tigers football team =

American college football season

1964 Texas Southern Tigers football
- Conference: Southwestern Athletic Conference
- Record: 5–5 (3–4 SWAC)
- Head coach: Alexander Durley (16th season)
- Home stadium: Jeppesen Stadium

1964 Southwestern Athletic Conference football standings
	Conf.					Overall
Team	W		L		T	W		L		T
No. 5/2 Prairie View A&M $	7	–	0	–	0	9	–	0	–	0
No. 19/NR Grambling	6	–	1	–	0	9	–	2	–	0
Jackson State	4	–	3	–	0	6	–	4	–	0
Alcorn A&M	3	–	4	–	0	5	–	5	–	0
Arkansas AM&N	3	–	4	–	0	5	–	5	–	0
Texas Southern	3	–	4	–	0	5	–	5	–	0
Southern	2	–	5	–	0	4	–	6	–	0
Wiley	0	–	7	–	0	2	–	7	–	0
$ – Conference champion; Rankings from NAIA poll and AP small college poll

The 1964 Texas Southern Tigers football team was an American football team that represented Texas Southern University as a member of the Southwestern Athletic Conference (SWAC) during the 1964 NCAA College Division football season. Led by 16th-year head coach Alexander Durley, the Tigers compiled an overall record of 5–5, with a mark of 3–4 in conference play, and finished tied for fourth in the SWAC.

== Schedule ==
Date	Opponent	Site	Result	Attendance	Source
September 19	vs. Southern	Public School Stadium; Galveston, TX	L 6–7		
October 2	at Lackland Air Force Base*	Lackland Stadium; San Antonio, TX	W 33–9		
October 10	No. 4 Prairie View A&M	Jeppesen Stadium; Houston, TX (rivalry)	L 13–16		
October 17	at Alcorn A&M	Henderson Stadium; Lorman, MS	W 26–24		
October 24	Wiley	Jeppesen Stadium; Houston, TX	W 40–20		
October 31	Grambling	Jeppesen Stadium; Houston, TX	L 8–25	16,000	
November 7	at Jackson State	Alumni Field; Jackson, MS	L 0–24		
November 14	at Arkansas AM&N	Pumphrey Stadium; Pine Bluff, AR	W 21–14		
November 21	Mississippi Valley State*	Jeppesen Stadium; Houston, TX	W 42–18		
November 28	vs. No. 9 Florida A&M*	Gator Bowl Stadium; Jacksonville, FL	L 14–24	17,000	
*Non-conference game; Rankings from AP Poll released prior to the game
