= 2012 Sam Houston State Bearkats football team =

American college football season

2012 Sam Houston State Bearkats football

Southland co-champion

FCS Championship Game, L 13–39 vs. North Dakota State
- Conference: Southland Conference

Ranking
- Sports Network: No. 2
- FCS Coaches: No. 2
- Record: 11–4 (6–1 Southland)
- Head coach: Willie Fritz (3rd season)
- Offensive coordinator: Doug Ruse (1st season)
- Offensive scheme: Spread option
- Defensive coordinator: Scott Stoker (4th season)
- Base defense: 3–3–5
- Home stadium: Bowers Stadium

2012 Southland Conference football standings
| | Conf. | | | Overall |
| Team | W | | L | W | | L |
|---|---|---|---|---|---|---|
| No. 10 Central Arkansas +^ | 6 | – | 1 | 9 | – | 3 |
| No. 2 Sam Houston State +^ | 6 | – | 1 | 11 | – | 4 |
| Southeastern Louisiana | 5 | – | 2 | 5 | – | 6 |
| McNeese State | 4 | – | 3 | 7 | – | 4 |
| Stephen F. Austin | 4 | – | 3 | 5 | – | 6 |
| Northwestern State | 2 | – | 5 | 4 | – | 7 |
| Lamar | 1 | – | 6 | 4 | – | 8 |
| Nicholls State | 0 | – | 7 | 1 | – | 10 |
+ – Conference co-champions; ^ – FCS playoff participant; Rankings from The Sports Network poll

The 2012 Sam Houston State Bearkats football team represented Sam Houston State University in the 2012 NCAA Division I FCS football season. The Bearkats were led by third-year head coach Willie Fritz and played their home games at Bowers Stadium. They were a member of the Southland Conference. They finished the season 11–4, 6–1 in Southland play to claim a share of the regular season conference championship. They earned an at-large bid to the FCS playoffs where they advanced to the national championship game where, for the second consecutive year, they lost to North Dakota State.

== Before the season ==
=== 2012 recruits ===
16 recruits originally committed to Sam Houston State during the 2012 Spring signing days. However QB Jared Johnson committed on February 21 to bring the number up to 17.

College recruiting (2012)
| Name | Hometown | School | Height | Weight | Commit date |
|---|---|---|---|---|---|
| Mouf Adebo; LB | Mansfield, TX | Mansfield | 6 ft 1 in (1.85 m) | 215 lb (98 kg) | |
| Mouf Adebo; LB | Recruit ratings: No ratings found | | | | |
| Jarell Crenshaw; DB/RS | Pearland, TX | Dawson | 5 ft 11 in (1.80 m) | 185 lb (84 kg) | |
| Jarell Crenshaw; DB/RS | Recruit ratings: No ratings found | | | | |
| Shelby Davis; CB/RS | Texarkana, TX | Texas | 5 ft 11 in (1.80 m) | 170 lb (77 kg) | |
| Shelby Davis; CB/RS | Recruit ratings: No ratings found | | | | |
| James DeLaRosa; DL | Fort Worth, TX | Brewer | 6 ft 1 in (1.85 m) | 275 lb (125 kg) | |
| James DeLaRosa; DL | Recruit ratings: No ratings found | | | | |
| Brandon DeWitt; OL | Lawton, OK | Lawton | 6 ft 3 in (1.91 m) | 285 lb (129 kg) | |
| Brandon DeWitt; OL | Recruit ratings: No ratings found | | | | |
| Roclan Drain; OL | Chatfield, TX | Corsicana | 6 ft 4 in (1.93 m) | 255 lb (116 kg) | |
| Roclan Drain; OL | Recruit ratings: No ratings found | | | | |
| R. J. Earl; OL | Clute, TX | Brazoswood | 6 ft 2 in (1.88 m) | 265 lb (120 kg) | |
| R. J. Earl; OL | Recruit ratings: No ratings found | | | | |
| Quaylon Ewing-Burton; DB | Houston, TX | Kempner; Boise State | 6 ft 1 in (1.85 m) | 184 lb (83 kg) | |
| Quaylon Ewing-Burton; DB | Recruit ratings: (TR) | | | | |
| Steven Hicks; RB | Mesquite, TX | Poteet | 5 ft 8 in (1.73 m) | 190 lb (86 kg) | |
| Steven Hicks; RB | Recruit ratings: No ratings found | | | | |
| Donald Jackson III; OL | Kilgore, TX | Kilgore | 6 ft 2 in (1.88 m) | 270 lb (120 kg) | |
| Donald Jackson III; OL | Recruit ratings: No ratings found | | | | |
| Jared Johnson; QB | Grand Prairie, TX | South Grand Prairie | 6 ft 1 in (1.85 m) | 205 lb (93 kg) | |
| Jared Johnson; QB | Recruit ratings: (75) | | | | |
| Braden King; TE/DS | Longview, TX | Longview | 6 ft 4 in (1.93 m) | 240 lb (110 kg) | |
| Braden King; TE/DS | Recruit ratings: No ratings found | | | | |
| Don King III; QB | Waxahachie, TX | Waxahachie | 6 ft 2 in (1.88 m) | 205 lb (93 kg) | |
| Don King III; QB | Recruit ratings: No ratings found | | | | |
| Sione Latu; DL | Euless, TX | Trinity | 6 ft 0 in (1.83 m) | 270 lb (120 kg) | |
| Sione Latu; DL | Recruit ratings: No ratings found | | | | |
| Richard LoLohea; OL | Euless, TX | Trinity | 6 ft 1 in (1.85 m) | 305 lb (138 kg) | |
| Richard LoLohea; OL | Recruit ratings: No ratings found | | | | |
| Nigel Robertson; LB | Dallas, TX | Skyline | 5 ft 11 in (1.80 m) | 225 lb (102 kg) | Jan 30, 2012 |
| Nigel Robertson; LB | Recruit ratings: No ratings found | | | | |
| Zachary Stevens; OL/DS | Cypress, TX | Cypress Fairbanks | 6 ft 1 in (1.85 m) | 270 lb (120 kg) | |
| Zachary Stevens; OL/DS | Recruit ratings: No ratings found | | | | |
| Shane Weeks; OL | Garland, TX | Sachse | 6 ft 3 in (1.91 m) | 265 lb (120 kg) | |
| Shane Weeks; OL | Recruit ratings: No ratings found | | | | |
Overall recruit ranking: Scout: Not Ranked Rivals: Not Ranked ESPN: Not Ranked
Note: In many cases, Scout, Rivals, 247Sports, On3, and ESPN may conflict in their listings of height and weight.; In these cases, the average was taken. ESPN grades are on a 100-point scale.; Sources: "2012 Player Commitments - Sam Houston State". ESPN.; "2012 Team Ranking". Rivals.com.

=== Orange-White Classic ===
Spring football began on Wednesday, March 21. The team would hold 14 practices over a five-week span. All weekday practices were scheduled for Monday, Wednesday, and Friday starting March 21. They took place at 3:30 PM, except for Easter Friday (April 6) which took place at 9 AM. Two Saturday practices were scheduled on March 24 and 31 at 9 AM. The 2012 Orange-White Classic concluded the Spring Football schedule. It was held Wednesday, April 18.

More than 2,000 fans came out to see the Spring Football game, featuring an offense versus defense format. The offense rolled up six touchdowns, and the defense came up with two turnovers in the 80-play scrimmage.

Junior quarterback Brian Bell completed 11 of 17 passes for 161 yards and a score. Senior wide receiver Trey Diller caught seven passes for 118 yards including a diving 26-yard touchdown catch.

Sophomore running back Keyshawn Hill carried six times for 47 yards and senior Vincent Dotson rushed 11 times for 49 yards.

Backup quarterback Chris Grett rushed for a two-yard score and hit wide receiver Beau Smith for a five-yard touchdown. Hill broke for a 30-yard touchdown and Richard Sincere scored on a 15-yard reserve. Newcomer Cody Morgan added a 19-yard touchdown. No score was kept throughout the game.

== Schedule ==
| Date | Time | Opponent | Rank | Site | TV | Result | Attendance |
|---|---|---|---|---|---|---|---|
| September 8 | 6:00 pm | Incarnate Word* | No. 1 | Bowers Stadium; Huntsville, TX | BSN | W 54–7 | 11,061 |
| September 15 | 6:00 pm | at Baylor* | No. 2 | Floyd Casey Stadium; Waco, TX | FCSC | L 23–48 | 44,856 |
| September 22 | 3:00 pm | at No. 25 Central Arkansas | No. 3 | Estes Stadium; Conway, AR | SLCTV | L 24–27 | 10,157 |
| September 27 | 7:00 pm | at Texas Southern* | No. 9 | BBVA Compass Stadium; Houston, TX | KHOU-DT2 | W 50–6 | 4,443 |
| October 6 | 3:00 pm | vs. Stephen F. Austin | No. 9 | Reliant Stadium; Houston, TX (Battle of the Piney Woods) | SLCTV | W 51–43 | 26,185 |
| October 13 | 6:00 pm | at Nicholls State | No. 9 | John L. Guidry Stadium; Thibodaux, LA | | W 41–0 | 5,632 |
| October 20 | 2:00 pm | McNeese State^{†} | No. 6 | Bowers Stadium; Huntsville, TX | CSNH | W 45–10 | 10,151 |
| October 27 | 3:00 pm | at Lamar | No. 5 | Provost Umphrey Stadium; Beaumont, TX | SLCTV | W 56–7 | 9,042 |
| November 3 | 2:00 pm | Southeastern Louisiana | No. 4 | Bowers Stadium; Huntsville, TX | BSN | W 70–0 | 6,844 |
| November 10 | 3:00 pm | at Northwestern State | No. 3 | Harry Turpin Stadium; Natchitoches, LA | SLCTV | W 52–17 | 7,256 |
| November 17 | 2:30 pm | at No. 9 (FBS) Texas A&M* | No. 3 | Kyle Field; College Station, TX | FSSW PPV | L 28–47 | 87,101 |
| December 1 | 3:00 pm | No. 12 Cal Poly* | No. 5 | Bowers Stadium; Huntsville, TX (NCAA Division I Second Round) | ESPN3 | W 18–16 | 7,073 |
| December 7 | 7:00 pm | at No. 2 Montana State* | No. 5 | Bobcat Stadium; Bozeman, MT (NCAA Division I Quarterfinal) | ESPN2 | W 34–16 | 16,417 |
| December 15 | 3:00 pm | at No. 4 Eastern Washington* | No. 5 | Roos Field; Cheney, WA (NCAA Division I Semifinal) | ESPNU | W 45–42 | 7,615 |
| January 5 | 12:00 pm | vs. No. 1 North Dakota State* | No. 5 | FC Dallas Stadium; Frisco, TX (NCAA Division I Football Championship Game) | ESPN2 | L 13–39 | 21,411 |
*Non-conference game; ^{†}Homecoming; Rankings from The Sports Network Poll released prior to the game; All times are in Central time

== Game summaries ==
=== Incarnate Word ===
Incarnate Word at Sam Houston State

| Team | 1 | 2 | 3 | 4 | Total |
|---|---|---|---|---|---|
| Cardinals | 7 | 0 | 0 | 0 | 7 |
| • #1 Bearkats | 13 | 7 | 20 | 14 | 54 |

- Date: September 8
- Location: Bowers Stadium
  Huntsville, TX
- Game start: 6:05 PM CST
- Elapsed time: 2:53
- Game attendance: 11,061
- Referee: Brian Alos
- Television network: BSN

The Bearkats open the season with their lone non-conference home game against the Division 2 Cardinals. It will be the first meeting between the Bearkats and Incarnate Word.

Sam Houston State took a brief 6-0 lead with a Timothy Flanders 40-yard rushing touchdown and a missed extra point. Incarnate Word took a 7-6 lead with a 26-yard pass to Trent Rios. The Bearkats retook the lead with another Flanders rushing touchdown in the second quarter and held the Cardinals scoreless for the rest of the game. Timothy Flanders finished with two touchdowns and became the school's all-time leading rusher. Keshawn Hill also scored two rushing touchdowns. Trey Diller ran for a touchdown as well. J. D. Standley and Chance Nelson added receiving touchdowns. Terrance Robinson closed out the scoring with a 60-yard punt return for a touchdown in the fourth quarter.

Scoring summary

| Quarter | Time | Drive | | | Team | Scoring information | Score | |
| Quarter | Time | Plays | Yards | TOP | Team | Scoring information | Incarnate Word | Sam Houston State |
|---|---|---|---|---|---|---|---|---|
| 1 | 11:15 | 2 | 39 | 0:45 | Sam Houston State | Tim Flanders 40-yard touchdown run, Miguel Antonio kick no good | 0 | 6 |
| 1 | 5:13 | 4 | 36 | 1:52 | Incarnate Word | Trent Rios 18-yard touchdown reception from Zach Rhodes, Jake Wilcox kick good | 7 | 6 |
| 1 | 0:33 | 11 | 67 | 4:35 | Sam Houston State | Tim Flanders 8-yard touchdown run, Miguel Antonio kick good | 7 | 13 |
| 2 | 4:29 | 1 | 21 | 0:11 | Sam Houston State | Trey Diller 11-yard touchdown run, Miguel Antonio kick no good | 7 | 20 |
| 3 | 12:37 | 5 | 66 | 2:23 | Sam Houston State | Keshawn Hill 11-yard touchdown run, Miguel Antonio kick good | 7 | 27 |
| 3 | 6:57 | 8 | 39 | 3:15 | Sam Houston State | J. D. Standley 3-yard touchdown reception from Brian Bell, 2-point run by James French failed | 7 | 33 |
| 3 | 5:30 | 2 | 48 | 0:38 | Sam Houston State | Keshawn Hill 27-yard touchdown run, Miguel Antonio kick good | 7 | 40 |
| 4 | 11:26 | 16 | 84 | 7:07 | Sam Houston State | Chance Nelson 11-yard touchdown reception from Brian Bell, Miguel Antonio kick good | 7 | 47 |
| 4 | 10:13 | | | | Sam Houston State | Kickoff returned 60 yards for touchdown by Terrance Robinson, Miguel Antonio kick good | 7 | 54 |
| "TOP" = time of possession. For other American football terms, see Glossary of American football. | | | | | | | 7 | 54 |

=== Baylor ===
The Bears and Bearkats meet each other for the fourth time in school history. All 4 games have been in Waco. Baylor currently owns a 3-0 advantage.

#2 Sam Houston State at Baylor

| Team | 1 | 2 | 3 | 4 | Total |
|---|---|---|---|---|---|
| #2 Bearkats | 3 | 17 | 0 | 3 | 23 |
| • Bears | 3 | 7 | 14 | 24 | 48 |

- Date: September 15
- Location: Floyd Casey Stadium
  Waco, TX
- Game start: 6:05 PM CST
- Elapsed time: 3:51
- Game attendance: 44,856
- Game weather: 79 °F (26 °C), Cloudy Skies, winds W at 6 mph (9.7 km/h)
- Referee: Mike Defee
- TV announcers (FCS Central): Steve Physioc, Gary Reasons, and Emily Jones

Scoring summary

| Quarter | Time | Drive | | | Team | Scoring information | Score | |
| Quarter | Time | Plays | Yards | TOP | Team | Scoring information | Sam Houston State | Baylor |
|---|---|---|---|---|---|---|---|---|
| 1 | 13:00 | 8 | 60 | 2:00 | Baylor | 30-yard field goal by Aaron Jones | 0 | 3 |
| 1 | 5:02 | 9 | 39 | 3:26 | Sam Houston State | 31-yard field goal by Miguel Antonio | 3 | 3 |
| 2 | 14:01 | 10 | 74 | 3:04 | Sam Houston State | 23-yard field goal by Miguel Antonio | 6 | 3 |
| 2 | 12:52 | 5 | 77 | 1:09 | Baylor | Terrance Williams 22-yard touchdown reception from Nick Florence, Aaron Jones kick good | 6 | 10 |
| 2 | 10:00 | 7 | 75 | 2:52 | Sam Houston State | Brian Bell 1-yard touchdown run, Miguel Antonio kick good | 13 | 10 |
| 2 | 1:30 | 12 | 76 | 6:07 | Sam Houston State | Tim Flanders 26-yard touchdown reception from Brian Bell, Miguel Antonio kick good | 20 | 10 |
| 3 | 14:10 | 1 | 9 | 0:05 | Baylor | Jordan Najvar 9-yard touchdown reception from Nick Florence, Miguel Antonio kick good | 20 | 17 |
| 3 | 6:17 | 11 | 66 | 3:13 | Baylor | Terrance Williams 18-yard touchdown reception from Nick Florence, Miguel Antonio kick good | 20 | 24 |
| 4 | 11:17 | 7 | 27 | 2:41 | Sam Houston State | 28-yard field goal by Miguel Antonio | 23 | 24 |
| 4 | 10:33 | 3 | 75 | 0:44 | Baylor | Glasco Martin 5-yard touchdown run, Aaron Jones kick good | 23 | 31 |
| 4 | 8:48 | 4 | 3 | 1:25 | Baylor | 26-yard field goal by Aaron Jones | 23 | 34 |
| 4 | 2:10 | 1 | 15 | 0:05 | Baylor | Lache Seastrunk 15-yard touchdown run, Aaron Jones kick good | 23 | 41 |
| 4 | 00:12 | | | | Baylor | Interception returned 73 yards for touchdown by Darius Jones, Aaron Jones kick good | 23 | 48 |
| "TOP" = time of possession. For other American football terms, see Glossary of American football. | | | | | | | 23 | 48 |

=== Central Arkansas ===
The Bearkats open the SLC season against the Central Arkansas Bears. It will be the seventh meeting overall. The winner will take the overall series lead, currently even at 3-3. The Bearkats have won the previous 3 meetings.

The game featured the top 2 SLC favorites, with the victor to probably win the conference title. The Bearkats go into the game with a higher ranking. The Bears are ranked too and have home field advantage.

The game was close throughout. The Bearkats jumped out to a 10-0 lead at the end of the first quarter. At halftime, it was 10-7, Sam Houston. Central Arkansas tied it up in the third quarter. In the fourth quarter, Sam Houston took a 20-10 lead with 5:24 left in the game. The Bears outcoached and outplayed their opponents for the next four minutes with a pair of touchdowns. Sam Houston had barely a minute left on the clock and down by 4 so they had to go for the touchdown. In the end, they were unable to get to the end zone one final time and Central Arkansas held on for the win 24-20.

#3 Sam Houston State at #25 Central Arkansas

| Team | 1 | 2 | 3 | 4 | Total |
|---|---|---|---|---|---|
| #3 Bearkats | 10 | 0 | 0 | 10 | 20 |
| • #25 Bears | 0 | 7 | 3 | 14 | 24 |

- Date: September 22
- Location: Estes Stadium
  Conway, AR
- Game start: 3:05 PM CST
- Elapsed time: 3:10
- Game attendance: 10,157
- Referee: Mike Dean
- TV announcers (SLC TV): Randy McIlvoy, Shea Walker, and Erin Cofiell

Scoring summary

| Quarter | Time | Drive | | | Team | Scoring information | Score | |
| Quarter | Time | Plays | Yards | TOP | Team | Scoring information | Sam Houston State | Central Arkansas |
|---|---|---|---|---|---|---|---|---|
| 1 | 8:21 | 12 | 48 | 5:22 | Sam Houston State | 35-yard field goal by Miguel Antonio | 3 | 0 |
| 1 | 1:41 | 2 | 72 | 0:42 | Sam Houston State | Tim Flanders 39-yard touchdown run, Miguel Antonio kick good | 10 | 0 |
| 2 | 10:05 | 9 | 80 | 3:20 | Central Arkansas | Terence Bobo 30-yard touchdown reception from Wynri Smothers, Eddie Camara kick good | 10 | 7 |
| 3 | 2:03 | 14 | 49 | 6:10 | Central Arkansas | 22-yard field goal by Eddie Camara | 10 | 10 |
| 4 | 12:41 | 11 | 80 | 4:17 | Sam Houston State | Tim Flanders 11-yard touchdown run, Miguel Antonio kick good | 17 | 10 |
| 4 | 5:24 | 12 | 66 | 6:03 | Sam Houston State | 26-yard field goal by Miguel Antonio | 20 | 10 |
| 4 | 3:18 | 8 | 75 | 2:06 | Central Arkansas | Wynri Smothers 17-yard touchdown run, Eddie Camara kick good | 20 | 17 |
| 4 | 0:57 | 5 | 72 | 1:14 | Central Arkansas | Dominiqu Croom 26-yard touchdown reception from Wynri Smothers, Eddie Camara kick good | 20 | 24 |
| "TOP" = time of possession. For other American football terms, see Glossary of American football. | | | | | | | 20 | 24 |

=== Texas Southern ===
The Tigers and Bearkats played each other for the first time since 1997, with the Bearkats looking to build on an 8-5 record they had against the Tigers. The Bearkats won the most recent meeting in 1997 and had won 4 of the last 5 and 8 of the last 10.

Sam Houston got on the board first with a 61-yard pass from quarterback Brian Bell to Chance Nelson with 12:00 remaining in the first quarter, which followed with kicker Miguel Antonio's extra point put the score 7-0 Sam Houston. Following an interception of a Tigers quarterback Rudy Johnson pass by Sam Houston defensive back Dax Swanson, the Bearkats scored another first-quarter touchdown with 5:18 remaining on a 32-yard run by wide receiver Trey Diller, with Sam Houston leading 14-0. During the second quarter, Texas Southern scored on a 16-yard pass by quarterback Justice Jones to James Davis with 12:11 remaining to make the score 14-6 Sam Houston, however, the Tigers' extra-point attempt was blocked by Sam Houston defensive tackle Preston Sanders, and defensive back Kenneth Jenkins scooped up the ball and ran it back for a defensive two-point conversion, raising Sam Houston's lead to 16-6. The Beakats then scored on a 22-yard pass from Bell to wide receiver Stephen Williams at the 10:16 minute mark, Antonio made a 19-yard field goal at 3:16 and Bell made a 32-yard scoring pass to Nelson in the closing minute of the quarter to end with Sam Houston leading 33-6 at halftime.

Sam Houston running back Keyshawn Hill made the lone score of the third quarter, a 36-yard rush at the 3:43-minute mark to raise Sam Houston's lead to 40-6. Just seven seconds into the fourth quarter, Sam Houston running back Ridgeway Frank ran in four-yard, putting the score at 47-6 Bearkats. Antonio made the final score of the game with a 39-yard field goal with 6:35 left in the quarter, with the final score 50-6 Sam Houston.

Sam Houston quarterback Brian Bell completed 10 of 15 passes for 208 yards and had one interception, and backup quarterback Chris Grett made one pass for four yards. Texas Southern quarterback Rudy Johnson completed six of 11 attempts for 39 yards and one interception, backup quarterbacks Justice Jones and Jeff Anderson made four completions out of seven attempts for 67 yards and one completion out of three attempts for nine yards, respectively. Sam Houston's Keshawn Hill rushed six times for 74 yards, Richard Sincere carried the ball eight times for 65 yards, Ridgeway Frank held it 13 times for 63 yards, Tim Flanders ran 10 times for 49 yards, Trey Diller rushed one time for 32 yards and Chris Grett ran four times for 28 yards. Sam Houston's Chance Nelson caught the ball three times for 127 yards, Terrance Robinson received it three times for 43 yards and Stephen Williams caught it two times for 32 yards.

With the win, Sam Houston improves to 2-2. The Bearkats lead the series 9-5.

#9 Sam Houston State at Texas Southern

| Team | 1 | 2 | 3 | 4 | Total |
|---|---|---|---|---|---|
| • #9 Bearkats | 14 | 19 | 7 | 10 | 50 |
| Tigers | 0 | 6 | 0 | 0 | 6 |

- Date: September 27
- Location: BBVA Compass Stadium
  Houston, TX
- Game start: 7:05 PM CST
- Elapsed time: 2:50
- Game attendance: 4,443
- Game weather: 87 °F (31 °C), Partly Cloudy
- Referee: Anthony Johnson
- TV announcers (KHOU 11.2): Nick Strong and Lamont Williams

Scoring summary

| Quarter | Time | Drive | | | Team | Scoring information | Score | |
| Quarter | Time | Plays | Yards | TOP | Team | Scoring information | Sam Houston State | Texas Southern |
|---|---|---|---|---|---|---|---|---|
| 1 | 12:00 | 2 | 68 | 0:50 | Sam Houston State | Nelson Chance 61-yard touchdown reception from Brian Bell, Miguel Antonio kick good | 7 | 0 |
| 1 | 5:18 | 6 | 61 | 2:48 | Sam Houston State | Trey Diller 32-yard touchdown run, Miguel Antonio kick good | 14 | 0 |
| 2 | 12:11 | 2 | 14 | 0:57 | Texas Southern & Sam Houston State | James Davis 16-yard touchdown reception from Justice Jones, Robert Hersh kick blocked, returned by Sam Houston State's Kenneth Jenkins for 2 points | 16 | 6 |
| 2 | 10:16 | 5 | 65 | 1:48 | Sam Houston State | Stephen Williams 22-yard touchdown reception from Brian Bell, Miguel Antonio kick good | 23 | 6 |
| 2 | 3:16 | 11 | 68 | 4:52 | Sam Houston State | 19-yard field goal by Miguel Antonio | 26 | 6 |
| 2 | 0:49 | 3 | 44 | 0:57 | Sam Houston State | Chance Nelson 32-yard touchdown reception from Brian Bell, Miguel Antonio kick good | 33 | 6 |
| 3 | 3:43 | 5 | 72 | 2:29 | Sam Houston State | Keshawn Hill 36-yard touchdown run, Miguel Antonio kick good | 40 | 6 |
| 4 | 14:53 | 4 | 31 | 1:25 | Sam Houston State | Frank Ridgeway 4-yard touchdown run, Miguel Antonio kick good | 47 | 6 |
| 4 | 6:35 | 12 | 65 | 5:27 | Sam Houston State | 39-yard field goal by Miguel Antonio | 50 | 6 |
| "TOP" = time of possession. For other American football terms, see Glossary of American football. | | | | | | | 6 | 50 |

=== Stephen F. Austin ===
The Battle of the Piney Woods returned to Reliant Stadium for a third consecutive season. The Bearkats sought to continue their 1-game winning streak against the Lumberjacks and build upon the record they have against Stephen F. Austin of 49-35-2.

Sam Houston worked its way down the field on its first possession but had to settle for a 39-yard field goal by kicker Miguel Antonio at the 12:55 minute marker, putting the Bearkats on the board 3-0. Stephen F. Austin forced a turnover late in the first quarter and quarterback Brady Attaway connected with wide receiver Ryan Gambel on a 30-yard pass in the closing seconds of the period to put the Lumberjacks on top 7-3. Sam Houston fumbled the ball again early in the second quarter, and Attaway threw a 27-yard scoring pass to wide receiver De'Vante Lacy just six seconds into the period to increase the lead to 14-3 Lumberjacks.

Sam Houston responded with five-yard pass from quarterback Brian Bell to tight end K. J. Williams with 12:21 remaining in the half to put the score 14-10 Lumberjacks. Later in the quarter, Sam Houston worked its way down to the red zone again, settling for a 22-yard field goal from Antonio, with the score now 14-13 Lumberjacks. Stephen F. Austin fought its way down to its red zone, however Attaway's pass was intercepted by Sam Houston cornerback Bookie Sneed who ran the ball back 92 yards for a scoring touchdown with 3:34 remaining, which followed by Antonio's extra point put the Bearkats ahead 20-13. Sneed's pick six broke Sam Houston's school record for an interception return of 90 yards set by Paul Wenzel in 1968 against Sul Ross. Antonio made a 42-yard field goal as the second quarter came to a close, with Sam Houston leading 23-13 at halftime.

The Lumberjacks opened the third quarter with a 77-yard touchdown pass from Attaway to D.J. Ward on the second play of their drive to close the gap to 23-20 Sam Houston. The Bearkats struck back at the 12:00-minute mark with a 31-yard touchdown pass from Bell to wide receiver Trey Diller, and again with a faked field goal attempt that ended with quarterback Bell running in a one-yard score with 7:59 remaining to raise Sam Houston's lead to 37-20. Another 30-yard touchdown pass from Bell to wide receiver Torrence Williams with 5:10 remaining stretched the lead to 44-20 Sam Houston. The Lumberjacks made the final score of the period with a 70-yard scoring pass from Attaway to wide receiver Cordell Roberson, and the third quarter came to close with Sam Houston leading 44-27.

Early in the fourth quarter, Bell made a nine-yard quarterback keeper rush into the end zone and the Bearkats extended their lead to 51-27. The Lumberjacks then launched a comeback attempt with Attaway completed a three-yard scoring pass to Roberson at the 10:56 minute mark, which was followed with a successful two-point conversion pass from Attaway to Ward. Roberson scored his third touchdown of the game with an eight-yard pass from Attaway with 5:43 remaining to close Sam Houston's lead to 51-43, however a late drive by the Lumberjacks ended on Sam Houston's 30-yard line, with a final score of 51-43 Sam Houston.

Sam Houston quarterback Brian Bell completed 12 of 20 passes for a total 168 yards, and Stephen F. Austin quarterback Brady Attaway completed 39 of 76 attempts for a career-best 545 yards and two interceptions. Sam Houston's Tim Flanders rushed 27 times for a total 125 yards, followed by quarterback Brian Bell who ran eight times for 69 yards, Richard Sincere who rushed 12 times for 27 yards and Ryan Wilson who carried the ball three times for eight yards. Trey Diller caught the ball four times for 97 yards. Torrence Williams caught it once for 30 yards and Terrance Robinson received the ball four times for 29 yards.

With the win, Sam Houston improves to 3-2. Sam Houston leads the series 50-35-2.

#9 Sam Houston State vs. Stephen F. Austin

| Team | 1 | 2 | 3 | 4 | Total |
|---|---|---|---|---|---|
| • Bearkats | 3 | 20 | 21 | 7 | 51 |
| Lumberjacks | 7 | 7 | 14 | 15 | 43 |

- Date: October 6
- Location: Reliant Stadium
  Houston, TX
- Game start: 3:00 PM CST
- Elapsed time: 3:44
- Game attendance: 26,185
- Game weather: Indoors
- Referee: Tom Walker
- TV announcers (SLC TV): Randy McIlvoy, Shea Walker, and Brooke Bentley

Scoring summary

| Quarter | Time | Drive | | | Team | Scoring information | Score | |
| Quarter | Time | Plays | Yards | TOP | Team | Scoring information | Sam Houston St. | Stephen F. Austin |
|---|---|---|---|---|---|---|---|---|
| 1 | 12:55 | 4 | 4 | 2:05 | Sam Houston State | 39-yard field goal by Miguel Antonio | 3 | 0 |
| 1 | 0:19 | 2 | 30 | 0:10 | Stephen F. Austin | Ryan Gambel 30-yard touchdown reception from Brady Attaway, Jordan Wiggs kick good | 3 | 7 |
| 2 | 14:54 | 3 | 29 | 0:19 | Stephen F. Austin | De'Vante Lacy 29-yard touchdown reception from Brady Attaway, Jordan Wiggs kick good | 3 | 14 |
| 2 | 11:21 | 3 | 23 | 1:52 | Sam Houston State | K. J. Williams 5-yard touchdown reception from Brian Bell, Miguel Antonio kick good | 10 | 14 |
| 2 | 5:55 | 9 | 66 | 4:39 | Sam Houston State | 22-yard field goal by Miguel Antonio | 13 | 14 |
| 2 | 3:34 | | | | Sam Houston State | Interception returned 92 yards for touchdown by Bookie Sneed, Miguel Antonio kick good | 20 | 14 |
| 2 | 0:00 | 6 | 33 | 1:54 | Sam Houston State | 42-yard field goal by Miguel Antonio | 23 | 14 |
| 3 | 14:38 | 2 | 77 | 0:12 | Stephen F. Austin | DJ Ward 77-yard touchdown reception from Brady Attaway, Jordan Wiggs kick good | 23 | 21 |
| 3 | 12:00 | 6 | 67 | 2:32 | Sam Houston State | Trey Diller 31-yard touchdown reception from Brian Bell, Miguel Antonio kick good | 30 | 21 |
| 3 | 7:59 | 7 | 64 | 3:30 | Sam Houston State | Brian Bell 1-yard touchdown run, Miguel Antonio kick good | 37 | 21 |
| 3 | 5:10 | 4 | 53 | 2:01 | Sam Houston State | Torrance Williams 30-yard touchdown reception from Brian Bell, Miguel Antonio kick good | 44 | 21 |
| 3 | 1:52 | 3 | 85 | 0:26 | Stephen F. Austin | Corde Roberson 70-yard touchdown reception from Brady Attaway, Jordan Wiggs kick good | 44 | 28 |
| 4 | 13:05 | 7 | 34 | 3:36 | Sam Houston State | Brian Bell 9-yard touchdown run, Miguel Antonio kick good | 51 | 28 |
| 4 | 10:54 | 10 | 75 | 2:11 | Stephen F. Austin | Corde Roberson 3-yard touchdown reception from Brady Attaway, 2-point Brady Attaway pass to DJ Ward good | 51 | 36 |
| 4 | 5:43 | 9 | 69 | 2:47 | Stephen F. Austin | Corde Roberson 8-yard touchdown reception from Brady Attaway, Jordan Wiggs kick good | 51 | 43 |
| "TOP" = time of possession. For other American football terms, see Glossary of American football. | | | | | | | 51 | 43 |

=== Nicholls State ===
The Bearkats continued their road SLC schedule, meeting the Colonels in Louisiana for Nicolls State's homecoming game. Going into the 28th meeting of the teams found the Bearkats 15-11-1 against the Colonels, having won 6 straight and 7 of the past 8.

There were no scores in the first quarter, however, eight seconds into the second quarter, Sam Houston running back Tim Flanders scored on a two-yard run, which, when followed by kicker Miguel Antonio's extra point, brought the score to 7-0 Sam Houston. Sam Houston quarterback Brian Bell made a five-yard scoring pass to wide receiver Melvis Pride with 4:20 remaining, and Sam Houston led the game 14-0 at halftime.

Early in the third quarter, Flanders ran in a 25-yard touchdown, and later made a one-yard score with 4:54 remaining in the quarter, bringing the score to 28-0 Sam Houston. In the closing seconds of the quarter, Bell threw an 18-yard pass to Chance Nelson, however the extra point attempt by kicker James French failed, bringing Sam Houston's lead to 34-0. Bearkats running back Ridgeway Frank made the last score of the game with a five-yard rush with 6:21 remaining in the fourth quarter, bringing the final score to 41-0 Sam Houston.

Sam Houston quarterback Brian Bell completed 15 of 19 passes for a total 180 yards, and Nicholls State quarterback Landry Klann completed 20 of 39 attempts for 238 yards. Sam Houston's Richard Sincere rushed 6 times for a total 74 yards, followed by Tim Flanders who ran 15 times for 67 yards and Ryan Wilson who rushed 10 times for 32 yards. Sincere also received the ball one time for 25 yards for a total 99 offensive yards. Trey Diller caught the ball seven times for 72 yards and Chance Nelson received the ball three times for 35 yards.

With the win, Sam Houston improves to 4-2. Sam Houston leads the series 16-11-1.

Sam Houston State at Nicholls State

| Team | 1 | 2 | 3 | 4 | Total |
|---|---|---|---|---|---|
| • Bearkats | 0 | 14 | 20 | 7 | 41 |
| Colonels | 0 | 0 | 0 | 0 | 0 |

- Date: October 13
- Location: John L. Guidry Stadium
  Thibodaux, LA
- Game start: 6:00 PM CST
- Elapsed time: 2:54
- Game attendance: 5,632
- Game weather: 82 °F (28 °C), Scattered Clouds, Winds SE 14 mph (23 km/h)
- Referee: Ross Smith

Scoring summary

| Quarter | Time | Drive | | | Team | Scoring information | Score | |
| Quarter | Time | Plays | Yards | TOP | Team | Scoring information | Sam Houston St. | Nicholls St. |
|---|---|---|---|---|---|---|---|---|
| 2 | 14:52 | 11 | 80 | 3:52 | Sam Houston State | Tim Flanders 2-yard touchdown run, Miguel Antonio kick good | 7 | 0 |
| 2 | 4:20 | 7 | 46 | 3:35 | Sam Houston State | Melvis Pride 5-yard touchdown reception from Brian Bell, Miguel Antonio kick good | 14 | 0 |
| 3 | 12:03 | 6 | 65 | 2:50 | Sam Houston State | Tim Flanders 25-yard touchdown run, Miguel Antonio kick good | 21 | 0 |
| 3 | 4:54 | 9 | 89 | 4:23 | Sam Houston State | Tim Flanders 1-yard touchdown run, Miguel Antonio kick good | 28 | 0 |
| 3 | 0:10 | 4 | 40 | 1:48 | Sam Houston State | Chance Nelson 18-yard touchdown reception from Brian Bell, James French kick failed | 34 | 0 |
| 4 | 5:21 | 7 | 51 | 3:24 | Sam Houston State | Ridgeway Frank 5-yard touchdown run, James French kick good | 41 | 0 |
| "TOP" = time of possession. For other American football terms, see Glossary of American football. | | | | | | | 41 | 0 |

=== McNeese State ===
This Bearkats celebrated their homecoming while trying to gain a rare occurrence when they faced McNeese State with the goal of winning two consecutive over the Cowboys (the only other time it has happened was 1958 and then 1970). This was the 29th meeting between the two schools with the Cowboys leading the overall series 22-6 going into the game.

The Cowboys struck first with a 32-yard pass from quarterback Cody Stroud to Kelvin Bennett at the 9:39 mark in the first quarter and an extra point by kicker Josh Lewis to put the score 7-0. The Beakats responded in the final minute of the first quarter with a 14-yard pass from quarterback Brian Bell to Chance Nelson, followed by an extra point by Miguel Antonio to tie it 7-7. During the second quarter, a 44-yard field goal by Lewis put the Cowboys back on top 10-7, but after that Sam Houston controlled the game, with a 44-yard touchdown run by Richard Sincere at the 7:28 minute mark and 12-yard run by Tim Flanders at the 2:12 minute mark, with Sam Houston leading at half time 21-10.

During the third quarter, Bell made a one-yard quarterback keeper with 8:24 remaining in the period, to be followed with a 22-yard field goal by Antonio to bring the score to 31-10 Sam Houston at the end of the quarter. Sincere made a 65-yard scoring run early in the fourth quarter, and Bearkat backup quarterback Chris Grett ran in a seven-yard score late in the game, with the final score 45-10 Sam Houston.

Sam Houston quarterback Brian Bell completed 16 of 25 passes for a total 193 yards and one interception, and McNeese quarterback Cody Stroud had 10 complete passes out of 26 attempts for 119 yards and an interception. Sam Houston's Richard Sincere rushed 12 times for a total 132 yards, followed by Tim Flanders who held the ball 19 times for 105 yards and Keshawn hill who ran three times for 51 yards. Sincere also received the ball three times for 23 yards for a total 155 offensive yards. Chance Nelson received the ball five times for 75 yards, followed by Trey Diller who caught it three times for 49 yards.

With the win, Sam Houston improves to 5-2. McNeese leads the series 22-7.

McNeese State at Sam Houston State

| Team | 1 | 2 | 3 | 4 | Total |
|---|---|---|---|---|---|
| Cowboys | 7 | 3 | 0 | 0 | 10 |
| • Bearkats | 7 | 14 | 10 | 14 | 45 |

- Date: October 20
- Location: Bowers Stadium
  Huntsville, TX
- Game start: 7:06 PM CST
- Elapsed time: 3:14
- Game attendance: 10,151
- Game weather: 82 °F (28 °C), Scattered Clouds
- Referee: Reggie Smith
- TV announcers (CSN Houston): Dave Saltzman, Eddie Robinson Jr., and Bart Enis

Scoring summary

| Quarter | Time | Drive | | | Team | Scoring information | Score | |
| Quarter | Time | Plays | Yards | TOP | Team | Scoring information | MSU | SHSU |
|---|---|---|---|---|---|---|---|---|
| "TOP" = time of possession. For other American football terms, see Glossary of American football. | | | | | | | | |

=== Lamar ===
The 19th meeting between the Cardinals and the Bearkats gave Sam Houston State back-to-back games in the state of Texas. The Bearkats owned a 10-7-1 series advantage with most of the success having occurred in recent years, having won 7 of the last 8 meetings.

Sam Houston got on the scoreboard late in the first quarter with a seven-yard run by running back Tim Flanders, and with the extra point by kicker Miguel Antonio brought it to 7-0 Sam Houston. Flanders scored again with 12:29 remaining in the second quarter, and Bearkats wide receiver Trey Diller caught a 48-yard pass by quarterback Brian Bell at the 1:16-minute mark, with Sam Houston leading 21-0 at halftime.

Flanders struck again early in the third quarter with a 59-yard scoring run at the 13:54 marker to raise the score to 28-0 Sam Houston, and then scored a fourth touchdown on a 10-yard run four minutes later for total 35-0 Sam Houston. Later in the quarter, running back Keshawn Hill scored on a six-yard run, bringing the score to 42-0 Sam Houston. On the next play, Lamar wide receiver Kevin Johnson ran an 89-yard kickoff return to put the Cardinals on the scoreboard 42-7 Sam Houston. Early in the fourth quarter, Sam Houston wide receiver Richard Sincere, in as quarterback, threw a 42-yard scoring pass to receiver Brandon Wilkerson, raising the score to 49-7 Sam Houston. Sam Houston's Cody Morgan made the final score of the game, a three-yard run with 4:41 remaining, for a final score of 56-7 Sam Houston.

Sam Houston quarterback Brian Bell completed 9 of 13 passes for a total 84 yards and Richard Sincere completed two of two passes for 46 yards. Lamar quarterback Caleb Berry had 12 complete passes out of 24 attempts for 96 yards and an interception. Sam Houston's Tim Flanders rushed 16 times for a total 131 yards, followed by Keshawn Hill who carried the ball seven times for 89 yards, Brian Bell who ran four times for 29 yards, and Ryan Wilson who rushed seven times for 40 yards. Sam Houston's Trey Diller caught the ball six times for 80 yards, Brandon Wilkerson received it two times for 40 yards and Terrence Robinson caught one pass for 12 yards.

With the win, Sam Houston improves to 6-2. Sam Houston leads the series 11-7-1.

Sam Houston State at Lamar

| Team | 1 | 2 | 3 | 4 | Total |
|---|---|---|---|---|---|
| • Bearkats | 7 | 14 | 21 | 14 | 56 |
| Cardinals | 0 | 0 | 7 | 0 | 7 |

- Date: October 27
- Location: Provost Umphrey Stadium
  Beaumont, TX
- Game start: 3:05 PM CST
- Elapsed time: 2:54
- Game attendance: 9,042
- Game weather: 62 °F (17 °C), Sunny and windy, Winds 20 mph (32 km/h)
- Referee: Ross Smith
- TV announcers (SLC TV): Randy McIlvoy, Shea Walker, and Brooke Bentley

Scoring summary

| Quarter | Time | Drive | | | Team | Scoring information | Score | |
| Quarter | Time | Plays | Yards | TOP | Team | Scoring information | SHSU | LAMAR |
|---|---|---|---|---|---|---|---|---|
| "TOP" = time of possession. For other American football terms, see Glossary of American football. | | | | | | | | |

=== Southeastern Louisiana ===
The 13th meeting between the Lions and Bearkats provided Sam Houston with their final home game of the regular season. The Bearkats looked to improve on the 8-4 record they have against the Lions.

Sam Houston running back Tim Flanders scored on a 14-yard run with 9:00 remaining in the first quarter, and fellow running back Richard Sincere ran in an eight-yard score at the 2:50 minute mark with Sam Houston leading 14-0 at the end of the period. Early in the second quarter, the Lions attempted a field goal, but the kick was blocked by Sam Houston defensive back Robert Shaw and fellow defensive back Kenneth Jenkins recovered the ball and ran it back 60 yards for a defensive score, and with Miguel Antonio extra point the score was 21-0 Sam Houston. Sam Houston running back Ryan Wilson scored on a 10-yard rush at the 8:16 minute mark, and Bearkats quarterback Brian Bell connected on a 70-yard pass to wide receiver Chance Nelson shortly after that bring the score to 35-0 Sam Houston. In the closing minute of the quarter, Brian Bell made a 23-yard scoring pass to wide receiver Torrance Williams, and Sam Houston lead at halftime 42-0.

The start of the third quarter was delayed nearly 90 minutes due to lightning strikes, and the remainder of the game was played in the rain. In the opening seconds of the second half, Flanders scored on a 71-yard run, raising Sam Houston's lead to 49-0. Backup quarterback Chris Grett took over during the period and made a four-yard quarterback keeper in the final minute of the third quarter bringing the score to 56-0 Sam Houston. Bearkats running back Keyshawn Hill scored twice in the fourth quarter on eight-yard and 55-yard rushes, respectively, and the final score was 70-0 Sam Houston.

Sam Houston quarterback Brian Bell completed 8 of 9 passes for a total 170 yards. Lions quarterback Nathan Stanley had 11 complete passes out of 27 attempts for 106 yards and an interception, and his fellow quarterback Jordan Barnett had one pass for 13 yards. Sam Houston's Tim Flanders rushed nine times for a total 146 yards, followed by Keshawn Hill who carried the ball 15 times for 132 yards, Ryan Wilson who rushed seven times for 37 yards, Chris Grett who ran six times for 28 yards and Brian Bell who ran four times for 23 yards. Sam Houston's Trey Diller caught the ball six times for 80 yards, Brandon Wilkerson received it two times for 40 yards and Terrence Robinson caught one pass for 12 yards. Sam Houston's Chance Nelson caught the ball twice for 97 yards, Torrance Williams once for 23 yards, Richard Sincere once for 22 yards and Trey Diller twice for 19 yards.

With the win, Sam Houston improves to 7-2. Sam Houston leads the series 9-4.

Southeastern Louisiana at Sam Houston State

| Team | 1 | 2 | 3 | 4 | Total |
|---|---|---|---|---|---|
| Lions | 0 | 0 | 0 | 0 | 0 |
| • Bearkats | 14 | 28 | 14 | 14 | 70 |

- Date: November 3
- Location: Bowers Stadium
  Huntsville, TX
- Game start: 2:00 PM CST
- Elapsed time: 4:01
- Game attendance: 6,844
- Game weather: 61 °F (16 °C), Rain, Winds
- Referee: Dan Romero

Scoring summary

| Quarter | Time | Drive | | | Team | Scoring information | Score | |
| Quarter | Time | Plays | Yards | TOP | Team | Scoring information | SELA | SHSU |
|---|---|---|---|---|---|---|---|---|
| "TOP" = time of possession. For other American football terms, see Glossary of American football. | | | | | | | | |

=== Northwestern State ===
The Bearkats end the regular conference season when they head to Louisiana to face the Demons. Overall, the Demons lead the series against the Bearkats 12-17.

The first score of the game was Timothy Flanders' 56-yard rush, which was immediately followed by a kickoff return by Northwestern's Ed Eagan. Following an early Bearkat field goal, Sam Houston State began to pour on the points during a 31-point second quarter led by QB Brian Bell's three touchdowns and DB Bookie Sneed's 11-yard interception return. The Bearkats would score 45 unanswered points before Northwestern finally got back on the board in the middle of the fourth quarter. The victory was Sam Houston State's seventh straight.

Running back Timothy Flanders gained 138 yards on 17 carries with 2 touchdowns. Quarterback Brian Bell had 239 yards with 3 touchdowns, all of which were scored in the third quarter. Receiver Trey Diller gained 119 yards on 7 receptions and a score. The Bearkat offense outgained the Demons 509 yards to just 183.

Sam Houston State at Northwestern State

| Team | 1 | 2 | 3 | 4 | Total |
|---|---|---|---|---|---|
| • Bearkats | 7 | 31 | 7 | 7 | 52 |
| Demons | 7 | 3 | 0 | 7 | 17 |

- Date: November 10
- Location: Harry Turpin Stadium
  Natchitoches, LA
- Game start: 3:05 PM CST
- Game attendance: 7256
- Game weather: 75 °F (24 °C)

Scoring summary

| Quarter | Time | Drive | | | Team | Scoring information | Score | |
| Quarter | Time | Plays | Yards | TOP | Team | Scoring information | SHSU | NWST |
|---|---|---|---|---|---|---|---|---|
| "TOP" = time of possession. For other American football terms, see Glossary of American football. | | | | | | | | |

=== Texas A&M ===
The Bearkats end the regular season back on the road when they visit Texas A&M. The two schools first met in 1919.

#3 FCS Sam Houston State at #9 FBS Texas A&M

| Team | 1 | 2 | 3 | 4 | Total |
|---|---|---|---|---|---|
| Bearkats | 0 | 0 | 7 | 21 | 28 |
| • Aggies | 7 | 27 | 13 | 0 | 47 |

- Date: November 17
- Location: Kyle Field
  College Station, TX
- Game start: 2:30 PM CST
- Game attendance: 87,101
- Game weather: 78 °F (26 °C), Sunny
- Television network: FSSW PPV

Scoring summary

| Quarter | Time | Drive | | | Team | Scoring information | Score | |
| Quarter | Time | Plays | Yards | TOP | Team | Scoring information | Sam Houston St | Texas A&M |
|---|---|---|---|---|---|---|---|---|
| 1 | 10:17 | 12 | 72 | 4:43 | Texas A&M | Mike Evans 7-yard touchdown reception from Johnny Manziel, Taylor Bertolet kick good | 0 | 7 |
| 2 | 10:43 | 8 | 95 | 2:49 | Texas A&M | Mike Evans 10-yard touchdown reception from Johnny Manziel, Taylor Bertolet kick good | 0 | 14 |
| 2 | 4:11 | 3 | 13 | 1:14 | Texas A&M | Johnny Manziel 4-yard touchdown run, Taylor Bertolet kick failed | 0 | 20 |
| 2 | 1:49 | 4 | 71 | 0:49 | Texas A&M | Trey Williams 6-yard touchdown run, Taylor Bertolet kick good | 0 | 27 |
| 2 | 1:24 | 2 | 20 | 0:16 | Texas A&M | Johnny Manziel 1-yard touchdown run, Taylor Bertolet kick good | 0 | 34 |
| 3 | 13:34 | 1 | 89 | 0:12 | Texas A&M | Uzoma Nwachukwu 89-yard touchdown reception from Johnny Manziel, Johnny Manziel kick failed | 0 | 40 |
| 3 | 10:41 | 1 | 80 | 0:13 | Texas A&M | LeKendrick Williams 80-yard touchdown reception from Jamiell Showers, Taylor Bertolet kick good | 0 | 47 |
| 3 | 1:08 | 18 | 75 | 9:33 | Sam Houston State | Tim Flanders 2-yard touchdown run, Miguel Antonio kick good | 7 | 47 |
| 4 | 14:20 | 4 | 49 | 1:48 | Sam Houston State | K.J. Williams 9-yard touchdown reception from Brian Bell, Miguel Antonio kick good | 14 | 47 |
| 4 | 5:37 | 8 | 55 | 4:11 | Sam Houston State | Ridgeway Frank 1-yard touchdown run, Miguel Antonio kick good | 21 | 47 |
| 4 | 2:40 | 4 | 56 | 1:46 | Sam Houston State | Chris Grett 5-yard touchdown run, Miguel Antonio kick good | 28 | 47 |
| "TOP" = time of possession. For other American football terms, see Glossary of American football. | | | | | | | 28 | 47 |

=== Cal Poly—NCAA Division I Second Round ===
The Bearkats' postseason began with a home game against fellow at-large qualifier Cal Poly of the Big Sky Conference. This was the first meeting of the two schools.

The first quarter was a defensive standoff, with both teams keeping each other scoreless. Sam Houston final got on the scoreboard at the 13:28 mark of the second quarter when Sam Houston special teams member Vincent Dotson blocked a punt attempt by Cal Poly punter Marco Tavecchio with the bowl rolling into the end zone. Two Sam Houston special teams member both chased the ball to score a defensive touchdown, but they collided while diving for the ball, sending the ball rolling out the back of the endzone for a safety, resulting in a 2-0 Sam Houston score. Sam Houston kicker Miguel Antonio scored two field goals during the period, a 20-yard kick near the middle of the quarter and a 32-yard goal in the final minute, giving Sam Houston an 8-0 lead at halftime.

Cal Poly struck back in the third quarter, with kicker Bobby Zalud scoring a 23-yard field goal at the 9:44 minute mark and again at the 3:48 mark to bring the score to 8-6 Sam Houston. Sam Houston then scored its only touchdown of the game in the final 30 seconds of the quarter with an 18-yard pass by quarterback Brian Bell to running back Keshawn Hill, raising Sam Houston's lead to 15-6. Cal Poly scored next during the fourth quarter with a 48-yard field goal by Zalud at the 9:25-minute mark to narrow Sam Houston's lead to 15-9. Sam Houston responded with 3:23 remaining with a 26-yard field goal by Antonio, spreading the lead to 18-9 Sam Houston. Cal Poly drove down the field with its next possession, and Mustangs quarterback Andre Broadous lateraled to wide receiver Ryan Taylor who in turn connected with wide receiver Wille Tucker on a 50-yard scoring pass with 1:34 remaining. The extra point by Zalud brought Cal Poly within two points of Sam Houston. Cal Poly attempted an onside kick, however Sam Houston wide receiver Trey Diller recovered the kick and the Bearkats ran out the remaining time by taking a knee, with the final score 18-16 Sam Houston.

Sam Houston quarterback Brian Bell completed 9 of 19 passes for a total 88 yards. Mustangs quarterback Andre Broadus had six complete passes out of 12 attempts for 113 yards and an interception. Sam Houston's Tim Flanders rushed 17 times for a total 101 yards, followed by Richard Sincere who carried the ball seven times for 39 yards and Keshawn Hill who rushed five times for 15 yards. Sam Houston's Chance Nelson caught the ball three times for 38 yards, Hill received it once for 18 yards.

#12 Cal Poly at #5 Sam Houston State

| Team | 1 | 2 | 3 | 4 | Total |
|---|---|---|---|---|---|
| #12 Mustangs | 0 | 0 | 6 | 10 | 16 |
| • #5 Bearkats | 0 | 8 | 7 | 3 | 18 |

- Date: December 1
- Location: Bowers Stadium
  Huntsville, TX
- Game attendance: 7,073

Scoring summary

| Quarter | Time | Drive | | | Team | Scoring information | Score | |
| Quarter | Time | Plays | Yards | TOP | Team | Scoring information | CPU | SHSU |
|---|---|---|---|---|---|---|---|---|
| "TOP" = time of possession. For other American football terms, see Glossary of American football. | | | | | | | | |

=== Montana State—NCAA Division I Quarterfinal ===
This was the first meeting between the two schools since Sam Houston State's victory over Montana State in the 2011 FCS Quarterfinals.

With the help of Brian Bell's 254 passing yards and three touchdowns, Sam Houston State cruised to yet another quarterfinal victory over Montana State with a final score of 36-14. The difference maker in this matchup proved to be Sam Houston's 17 unanswered points scored in the second quarter to bring the score to 20-3. Montana State cut Sam Houston's lead to 20-9 to start the second half, but a Bobcat turnover early in the third quarter stopped a potential comeback as Sam Houston controlled the game from that point on. Sam Houston State created 2 turnovers, 5 sacks, and allowed under 300 yards to the Montana State offense. With this victory, Sam Houston secured a spot in the semifinals.

Sam Houston State at Montana State

| Team | 1 | 2 | 3 | 4 | Total |
|---|---|---|---|---|---|
| • #5 Bearkats | 3 | 17 | 7 | 7 | 34 |
| #2 Bobcats | 3 | 0 | 6 | 7 | 16 |

- Date: December 7, 2012
- Location: Bobcat Stadium
  Bozeman, MT
- Game attendance: 16,076
- Television network: ESPN2

Scoring summary

| Quarter | Time | Drive | | | Team | Scoring information | Score | |
| Quarter | Time | Plays | Yards | TOP | Team | Scoring information | CPU | SHSU |
|---|---|---|---|---|---|---|---|---|
| "TOP" = time of possession. For other American football terms, see Glossary of American football. | | | | | | | | |

=== Eastern Washington—NCAA Division I Semifinal ===
The only previous meeting between these two teams was in the 2004 FCS Quarterfinals, where Sam Houston defeated Eastern Washington 35-34.

This FCS Semifinals game proved to be an instant classic in a game that saw a combined 87 points, over one thousand yards of combined offense, and a tale of two halves.

The game began as a blowout in favor of Sam Houston State, as the Bearkats piled on the touchdowns en route to a 35-0 first half. The third quarter was all Eastern Washington and the Eagles cut down the lead to 35-21. The first score of the fourth quarter was yet another Eagle passing touchdown, which brought the score to 35-28. Sam Houston stopped the bleeding with a touchdown pass from Brian Bell with 10 minutes left in the fourth quarter as Sam Houston extended the lead to 42-28. Eastern Washington didn't take long to strike back, as it only took the Eagles one minute and one second to score their 5th touchdown in the second half, as they cut the Bearkat lead to 7 points. Sam Houston scored a field goal to make it a two score game with 5 minutes remaining. However, the Eagles were not done. Another passing touchdown from Eastern Washington brought the Eagles to within 3 with three minutes left. The Bearkats ran out the remaining clock with the help of running back Timothy Flanders as Sam Houston State wins 45-42 in a thriller.

Eastern Washington's quarterback Vernon Adams finished with 364 yards and 6 touchdowns and their receiver Brandon Kaufman had 3 touchdowns with 215 yards. Sam Houston State's running back Timothy Flanders ran for 231 yards in the game.

Sam Houston State at Eastern Washington University

| Team | 1 | 2 | 3 | 4 | Total |
|---|---|---|---|---|---|
| • #5 Bearkats | 14 | 21 | 0 | 10 | 45 |
| #4 Eagles | 0 | 0 | 21 | 21 | 42 |

- Date: December 15, 2012
- Location: Roos Field
  Cheney, WA
- Game start: 4 PM EST
- Game attendance: 7,615
- Television network: ESPNU

Scoring summary

| Quarter | Time | Drive | | | Team | Scoring information | Score | |
| Quarter | Time | Plays | Yards | TOP | Team | Scoring information | CPU | SHSU |
|---|---|---|---|---|---|---|---|---|
| "TOP" = time of possession. For other American football terms, see Glossary of American football. | | | | | | | | |

=== North Dakota State—NCAA Division I Championship Game ===
Sam Houston State and North Dakota State play each other in the FCS National Championship Game for the second year in a row. North Dakota State won 17-6 in the 2011 National Championship Game.

#1 North Dakota State vs #5 Sam Houston State

| Team | 1 | 2 | 3 | 4 | Total |
|---|---|---|---|---|---|
| • #1 Bison | 3 | 7 | 15 | 14 | 39 |
| #5 Bearkats | 0 | 10 | 0 | 3 | 13 |

- Date: January 5, 2013
- Location: FC Dallas Stadium
  Frisco, TX
- Game start: 1 PM EST
- Game attendance: 21,411
- Television network: ESPN2

Scoring summary

| Quarter | Time | Drive | | | Team | Scoring information | Score | |
| Quarter | Time | Plays | Yards | TOP | Team | Scoring information | CPU | SHSU |
|---|---|---|---|---|---|---|---|---|
| "TOP" = time of possession. For other American football terms, see Glossary of American football. | | | | | | | | |

== Ranking movements ==
Ranking movements Legend: ██ Increase in ranking ██ Decrease in ranking
| | Week | | | | | | | | | | | | | | | | |
| Poll | Pre | 1 | 2 | 3 | 4 | 5 | 6 | 7 | 8 | 9 | 10 | 11 | 12 | 13 | 14 | 15 | Final |
|---|---|---|---|---|---|---|---|---|---|---|---|---|---|---|---|---|---|
| Sports Network | 1 | 1 | 2 | 3 | 9 | 9 | 9 | 6 | 5 | 4 | 3 | 5 | 5 | 5 | 5 | 5 | 2 |
| Coaches | 2 | 2 | 2 | 3 | 10 | 9 | 8 | 6 | 5 | 4 | 3 | 5 | 5 | 5 | 5 | 5 | 2 |

== Roster ==
2012 Sam Houston State Bearkats football team roster
Players
Coaches
Offense

| Pos. | # | Name | Class |
|---|---|---|---|
| QB | 11 | Brian Bell | Jr |
| QB | 5 | Chris Grett | So |
| QB | | Jared Johnson | Fr |
| QB | | Don King III | Fr |
| QB | | Matt Merkins | So |
| RB | 44 | Michael Buse | Sr |
| RB | 22 | Vincent Dotson | Sr |
| RB | 20 | Tim Flanders | Jr |
| RB | 25 | Ridgeway Frank | Jr |
| RB | | Steven Hicks | Fr |
| RB | 26 | Keyshawn Hill | So |
| RB | 4 | Ryan Wilson | Jr |
| TE | 83 | T. J. Jones | Sr |
| TE | | Braden King | Fr |
| TE | 84 | Beau Smith | So |
| TE | 46 | J. D. Standley | Sr |
| TE | 88 | K. J. Williams | Sr |
| TE | 89 | Shane Young | So |
| WR | 87 | Brandon Ashcraft | So |
| WR | 87 | Keith Blanton | Jr |
| WR | 18 | Trey Diller | Jr |
| WR | 85 | Edward Herbert | So |
| WR | | Greg Johnson | So |
| WR | 13 | Kevin Matthews | Sr |
| WR | 1 | Emory Miller | So |
| WR | 86 | Dustin Moehlig | So |
| WR | 8 | Seth Patterson | Sr |
| WR | 14 | Melvis Pride | Sr |
| WR | 6 | Richard Sincere | Jr |
| WR | 81 | Rickey Smith | So |
| WR | 9 | Brandon Wilkerson | So |
| WR | 82 | Stephen Williams | So |
| WR | 10 | Torrance Williams | Jr |
| OL | 76 | Matt Boyles | Jr |
| OL | | Brandon DeWitt | Fr |
| OL | | Roclan Drain | Fr |
| OL | | R. J. Earls | Fr |
| OL | 71 | Scott Gonzales | So |
| OL | 79 | Justin Havard | So |
| OL | 77 | Kaleb Hopson | Sr |
| OL | | Donald Jackson III | Fr |
| OL | 70 | Dan Jenkins | Sr |
| OL | | Richard LoLohea | Fr |
| OL | 75 | Jeremy Robinson | So |
| OL | 57 | Chris Rogers | Sr |
| OL | 67 | Riley Smith | Sr |
| OL | | Zachary Stevens | Fr |
| OL | | Shane Weeks | Fr |
| OL | 72 | Joey White | So |

Defense

| Pos. | # | Name | Class |
|---|---|---|---|
| CB | | Shelby Davis | Fr |
| CB | 42 | Benjamin Griffith | So |
| CB | 38 | DeAntrey Loche | Jr |
| CB | 29 | Andre Moseley | So |
| CB | 28 | Chuks Orabuchi | So |
| CB | 17 | Bookie Sneed | Jr |
| DB | 22 | Duke Bohall | Sr |
| DB | | Jarell Crenshaw | Fr |
| DB | | Tristan Eche | So |
| DB | | Quaylon Ewing-Burton | Jr |
| DB | 16 | Desmond Fite | So |
| DB | 40 | Cory Hamlett | So |
| DB | 32 | Kenneth Jenkins | Sr |
| DB | 27 | Mike Littleton | Sr |
| DB | 23 | Robert Shaw | Sr |
| DB | 7 | Dax Swanson | Sr |
| DB | 38 | Darnell Taylor | Sr |
| DB | 31 | Michael Wade | So |
| DE | 34 | Casey Devries | So |
| DE | 55 | Emmanuel Omoegbele | So |
| DE | 58 | Ishmael Thorns | So |
| DE | 92 | Andrew Weaver | Sr |
| DT | 91 | Preston Sanders | Jr |
| DL | 99 | Forbes Baggett | Jr |
| DL | 97 | Jarrett Brown | Jr |
| DL | 59 | J. T. Cleveland | Sr |
| DL | | James DeLaRosa | Fr |
| DL | | Sione Latu | Fr |
| DL | 66 | Gary Lorance | Jr |
| DL | 54 | Gavareon Marshall | So |
| DL | 96 | Marco Segura | Sr |
| DL | 95 | John Trotter | So |
| LB | | Mouf Adebo | Fr |
| LB | 60 | Dalton Bynum | So |
| LB | 50 | Collin Callahan | So |
| LB | 47 | Kash David | Sr |
| LB | 51 | Eric Fieilo | Sr |
| LB | 37 | Jeremy Jackson | So |
| LB | 53 | Kevin Jackson | So |
| LB | | Nigel Robertson | Fr |
| LB | 36 | Darius Taylor | Sr |

Special teams

| Pos. | # | Name | Class |
|---|---|---|---|
| PK | 2 | Miguel Antonio | Sr |
| P | 12 | Matt Foster | Sr |
| DS | 63 | Ken Jones | Jr |

Head coach

- Willie Fritz (Pittsburg State)

Coordinators/assistant coaches

- Matt Barrett (NC State)
  Wide receivers
- Ben Beasley (McNeese State)
  Secondary
- Johnny Jernigan (Stephen F. Austin)
  Defensive line
- Anthony Johnson (Texas)
  Running backs
- Doug Ruse (Northwest Missouri State)
  Offensive coordinator
- Scott Stoker (Northwestern State)
  Defensive Cooradintor
- Bart Tatum (Missouri)
  Offensive line

Legend

- (C) Team captain
- (S) Suspended
- (I) Ineligible
- Injured
- Redshirt

Roster

== Media ==
All Bearkats football games were broadcast by KSAM 101.7 FM. All non-televised Bearkats home games were streamed online by the Bearkats Sports Network at gobearkats.com.
