= 1964 Wiley Wildcats football team =

American college football season

1964 Wiley Wildcats football
- Conference: Southwestern Athletic Conference
- Record: 2–7 (0–7 SWAC)
- Head coach: Fred T. Long (34th season)
- Home stadium: Wildcat Stadium

1964 Southwestern Athletic Conference football standings
	Conf.					Overall
Team	W		L		T	W		L		T
No. 5/2 Prairie View A&M $	7	–	0	–	0	9	–	0	–	0
No. 19/NR Grambling	6	–	1	–	0	9	–	2	–	0
Jackson State	4	–	3	–	0	6	–	4	–	0
Alcorn A&M	3	–	4	–	0	5	–	5	–	0
Arkansas AM&N	3	–	4	–	0	5	–	5	–	0
Texas Southern	3	–	4	–	0	5	–	5	–	0
Southern	2	–	5	–	0	4	–	6	–	0
Wiley	0	–	7	–	0	2	–	7	–	0
$ – Conference champion; Rankings from NAIA poll and AP small college poll

The 1964 Wiley Wildcats football team represented Wiley College as a member of the Southwestern Athletic Conference (SWAC) during the 1964 NCAA College Division football season. Led by 34th-year head coach Fred T. Long, the Wildcats compiled an overall record of 2–7, with a conference record of 0–7, and finished eighth in the SWAC.

== Schedule ==
Date	Opponent	Site	Result	Attendance	Source
September 26	at Alcorn A&M	Henderson Stadium; Lorman, MS	L 6–14		
October 3	at Bishop*	Bishop Stadium; Dallas, TX	W 13–7		
October 19	vs. No. 5 Prairie View A&M	Cotton Bowl; Dallas, TX (State Fair Classic)	L 13–39	5,000	
October 24	at Texas Southern	Jeppesen Stadium; Houston, TX	L 20–40		
October 31	Jackson State	Wildcat Stadium; Marshall, TX	L 14–20	2,500	
November 7	at Southern	University Stadium; Baton Rouge, LA	L 13–39		
November 14	Grambling	Wildcat Stadium; Marshall, TX	L 21–40		
November 21	Arkansas AM&N	Wildcat Stadium; Marshall, TX	L 0–48	700	
November 26	at Dillard*	Alumni Stadium; New Orleans, LA (Thanksgiving Day Classic)	W 27–14		
*Non-conference game; Rankings from AP Poll released prior to the game
