= 1964 Grambling Tigers football team =

American college football season

1964 Grambling Tigers football

Orange Blossom Classic, L 15–42 vs. Florida A&M
- Conference: Southwestern Athletic Conference
- Record: 9–2 (6–1 SWAC)
- Head coach: Eddie Robinson (22nd season)
- Home stadium: Grambling Stadium

1964 Southwestern Athletic Conference football standings
	Conf.					Overall
Team	W		L		T	W		L		T
No. 5/2 Prairie View A&M $	7	–	0	–	0	9	–	0	–	0
No. 19/NR Grambling	6	–	1	–	0	9	–	2	–	0
Jackson State	4	–	3	–	0	6	–	4	–	0
Alcorn A&M	3	–	4	–	0	5	–	5	–	0
Arkansas AM&N	3	–	4	–	0	5	–	5	–	0
Texas Southern	3	–	4	–	0	5	–	5	–	0
Southern	2	–	5	–	0	4	–	6	–	0
Wiley	0	–	7	–	0	2	–	7	–	0
$ – Conference champion; Rankings from NAIA poll and AP small college poll

The 1964 Grambling Tigers football team represented Grambling College (now known as Grambling State University) as a member of the Southwestern Athletic Conference (SWAC) during the 1964 NCAA College Division football season. Led by 22nd-year head coach Eddie Robinson, the Tigers compiled an overall record of 9–2 and a mark of 6–1 in conference play, and finished second in the SWAC.

== Schedule ==
Date	Opponent	Site	Result	Attendance	Source
September 19	Alcorn A&M	Grambling Stadium; Grambling, LA	W 32–14		
September 26	at Southern	University Stadium; Baton Rouge, LA (rivalry)	W 20–17	26,000	
October 3	at Prairie View A&M	Edward L. Blackshear Field; Prairie View, TX (rivalry)	L 14–22		
October 10	Tennessee A&I*	Grambling Stadium; Grambling, LA	W 20–18		
October 17	at Mississippi Valley State*	Magnolia Stadium; Itta Bena, MS	W 20–7		
October 24	Jackson State^{†}	Grambling Stadium; Grambling, LA	W 47–26	15,000	
October 31	at Texas Southern	Jeppesen Stadium; Houston, TX	W 25–8	16,000	
November 7	Arkansas AM&N	Grambling Stadium; Grambling, LA	W 39–0		
November 14	at Wiley	Wildcat Stadium; Marshall, TX	W 40–21		
November 28	vs. Bishop*	City Park Stadium; New Orleans, LA (Sugar Cup Classic)	W 42–6		
December 5	vs. Florida A&M*	Miami Orange Bowl; Miami, FL (Orange Blossom Classic)	L 15–42	28,127	
*Non-conference game; ^{†}Homecoming
