= 1964 Concordia Cobbers football team =

American college football season

1964 Concordia Cobbers football

NAIA national co-champion MIAC champion

Champion Bowl, T 7–7 vs. Sam Houston State
- Conference: Minnesota Intercollegiate Athletic Conference
- Record: 10–0–1 (7–0 MIAC)
- Head coach: Jake Christiansen (24th season)
- Captains: John Nellermoe; Raleigh Lillemoe

1964 Minnesota Intercollegiate Athletic Conference football standings
	Conf.					Overall
Team	W		L		T	W		L		T
No. 1 Concordia (MN) $^	7	–	0	–	0	10	–	0	–	1
Augsburg	5	–	2	–	0	6	–	3	–	0
Gustavus Adolphus	4	–	3	–	0	5	–	4	–	0
Saint John's (MN)	4	–	3	–	0	4	–	3	–	0
St. Thomas (MN)	3	–	4	–	0	3	–	6	–	0
Minnesota–Duluth	2	–	5	–	0	4	–	5	–	0
Hamline	2	–	5	–	0	2	–	7	–	0
Macalester	1	–	6	–	0	1	–	7	–	0
$ – Conference champion; ^ – NAIA playoff participant; Rankings from NAIA poll

The 1964 Concordia Cobbers football team was an American football team that represented Concordia College of Moorhead, Minnesota, as a member of the Minnesota Intercollegiate Athletic Conference (MIAC) during the 1964 NAIA football season. In their 24th year under head coach Jake Christiansen, the Cobbers compiled a 10–0–1 record (7–0 against conference opponents), won the MIAC championship, and tied Sam Houston State in the Champion Bowl to share the NAIA national championship.

Junior fullback Dave Heide totaled 993 rushing yards in nine regular-season games. Four Cobbers received first-team honors on the 1964 All-MIAC football team selected by the conference coaches: Heide; senior quarterback Bob Nick (praised for his "versatility and amazing football sense"); senior end Paul Brynteson (chosen for his "blocking strength", "pass-catching moves", and "place-kicking toe"); and linebacker Bob Braun (described as "a 200-pound socker").

Concordia had a total enrollment in the fall of 1964 of 1,800 students.

== Schedule ==
Date	Opponent	Site	Result	Attendance	Source
September 12	Parsons*	Moorhead, MN	W 28–14		
September 19	Moorhead State*	Moorhead, MN	W 49–0		
September 26	at Gustavus Adolphus	St. Peter, MN	W 14–6		
October 3	at Minnesota–Duluth	Duluth, MN	W 24–6		
October 10	Hamline	Moorhead, MN	W 30–0		
October 17	at Macalester	Saint Paul, MN	W 45–8		
October 24	at St. Thomas (MN)	Saint Paul, MN	W 9–0		
October 31	Saint John's (MN)	Moorhead, MN	W 20–0		
November 7	Augsburg	Moorhead, MN	W 39–18		
November 21	Linfield*	Moorhead, MN (NAIA semifinal)	W 28–6	5,200	
December 12	vs. Sam Houston State*	Augusta, GA (Champion Bowl)	T 7–7	4,500	
*Non-conference game
