= 1964 Florida A&M Rattlers football team =

American college football season

1964 Florida A&M Rattlers football

SIAC champion Orange Blossom Classic champion

Orange Blossom Classic, W 42–15 vs. Grambling
- Conference: Southern Intercollegiate Athletic Conference
- Record: 9–1 (3–0 SIAC)
- Head coach: Jake Gaither (20th season)
- Home stadium: Bragg Memorial Stadium

The 1964 Florida A&M Rattlers football team was an American football team that represented Florida A&M University as a member of the Southern Intercollegiate Athletic Conference (SIAC) during the 1964 NCAA College Division football season. In their 20th season under head coach Jake Gaither, the Rattlers compiled a 9–1 record, were ranked No. 9 in the final AP small college poll and No. 12 in the final UPI coaches poll, and suffered its sole loss to Southern. In the post-season, the Rattlers defeated Grambling in the Orange Blossom Classic.

The team's statistical leaders included Bobby Felts with 468 rushing yards and 10 touchdowns and Ernie Hart with 1,123 passing yards and 66 points scored.

== Schedule ==
Date	Opponent	Rank	Site	Result	Attendance	Source
October 3	Lincoln (MO)*		Bragg Memorial Stadium; Tallahassee, FL	W 14–3	6,000	
October 10	Central State (OH)*	No. 5	Bragg Memorial Stadium; Tallahassee, FL	W 56–15		
October 17	at Morris Brown	No. 3	Herndon Stadium; Atlanta, GA	W 28–0	12,000	
October 24	Tennessee A&I*	No. 2	Bragg Memorial Stadium; Tallahassee, FL	W 22–20	11,000	
October 31	vs. Benedict	No. 3	Phillips Field; Tampa, FL (Golden Triangle Classic)	W 54–6		
November 7	North Carolina A&T*	No. 3	Bragg Memorial Stadium; Tallahassee, FL	W 46–24		
November 14	at Southern*	No. 3	University Stadium; Baton Rouge, LA	L 20–43		
November 21	at Bethune–Cookman		Memorial Stadium; Daytona Beach, FL (Florida Classic)	W 31–14		
November 28	vs. Texas Southern*	No. 9	Gator Bowl Stadium; Jacksonville, FL	W 24–14	17,000	
December 5	vs. Grambling*	No. 9	Orange Bowl; Miami, FL (Orange Blossom Classic)	W 42–15	28,127	
*Non-conference game; Rankings from AP Poll released prior to the game
