= 1964 Sam Houston State Bearkats football team =

American college football season

1964 Sam Houston State Bearkats football

NAIA national co-champion LSC champion

Champion Bowl, T 7–7 vs. Concordia (MN)
- Conference: Lone Star Conference
- Record: 9–1–1 (5–1 LSC)
- Head coach: Paul Pierce (13th season)
- Home stadium: Pritchett Field

1964 Lone Star Conference football standings
	Conf.					Overall
Team	W		L		T	W		L		T
No. 2/10 Sam Houston State $^	5	–	1	–	0	9	–	1	–	1
No. 14/NR Sul Ross	4	–	1	–	1	7	–	3	–	1
Southwest Texas State	4	–	2	–	0	7	–	2	–	0
Texas A&I	3	–	2	–	1	7	–	2	–	1
Stephen F. Austin	3	–	3	–	0	4	–	5	–	0
East Texas State	1	–	5	–	0	2	–	7	–	0
Howard Payne	0	–	6	–	0	2	–	8	–	0
$ – Conference champion; ^ – NAIA playoff participant; Rankings from NAIA poll and AP small college poll

The 1964 Sam Houston State Bearkats football team was an American football team that represented Sam Houston State University as a member of the Lone Star Conference (LSC) during the 1964 NAIA football season. In their 13th year under head coach Paul Pierce, the Bearkats compiled a 9–1–1 record (5–1 against conference opponents), won the Lone Star Conference championship, and tied Concordia (Minnesota) in the Champion Bowl to share the NAIA national championship. The team's only loss was to Sul Ross.

Seven Sam Houston State players received first-team honors on the 1964 All-Lone Star Conference football team selected by the conference coaches: halfback Billy Arlen; offensive guard Keith Collins; center Don Murray; defensive tackle Frank Fox; defensive guard Benny Sorgee; linebacker David Martin; and defensive halfback Edward Bittick.

The team played its home games at Pritchett Field in Huntsville, Texas.

== Schedule ==
Date	Opponent	Rank	Site	Result	Attendance	Source
September 19	at Tarleton State*		Stephenville, TX	W 10–8	1,200	
October 3	Corpus Christi*		Pritchett Field; Huntsville, TX	W 48–12	6,200	
October 10	at Howard Payne		Brownwood, TX	W 20–0	1,000	
October 17	Texas Lutheran*		Pritchett Field; Huntsville, TX	W 27–0	6,500	
October 24	Southwest Texas State		Pritchett Field; Huntsville, TX (rivalry)	W 15–14	5,000–6,500	
October 31	at Stephen F. Austin		Memorial Stadium; Nacogdoches, TX (rivalry)	W 21–8	11,500	
November 7	East Texas State		Pritchett Field; Huntsville, TX	W 6–0	8,500	
November 14	at No. 7 Texas A&I		Javelina Stadium; Kingsville, TX	W 21–16	10,050	
November 21	Sul Ross	No. 9	Pritchett Field; Huntsville, TX	L 7–14	6,500	
November 28	at Findlay*	No. 10	Donnell Memorial Stadium; Findlay, OH (NAIA semifinal)	W 32–21	5,000	
December 12	vs. Concordia (MN)*	No. 10	Augusta, GA (Champion Bowl)	T 7–7	4,500	
*Non-conference game; Rankings from AP Poll released prior to the game
