= 1964 Alcorn A&M Braves football team =

American college football season

1964 Alcorn A&M Braves football
- Conference: Southwestern Athletic Conference
- Record: 5–5 (3–4 SWAC)
- Head coach: Marino Casem (1st season)
- Home stadium: Henderson Stadium

1964 Southwestern Athletic Conference football standings
	Conf.					Overall
Team	W		L		T	W		L		T
No. 5/2 Prairie View A&M $	7	–	0	–	0	9	–	0	–	0
No. 19/NR Grambling	6	–	1	–	0	9	–	2	–	0
Jackson State	4	–	3	–	0	6	–	4	–	0
Alcorn A&M	3	–	4	–	0	5	–	5	–	0
Arkansas AM&N	3	–	4	–	0	5	–	5	–	0
Texas Southern	3	–	4	–	0	5	–	5	–	0
Southern	2	–	5	–	0	4	–	6	–	0
Wiley	0	–	7	–	0	2	–	7	–	0
$ – Conference champion; Rankings from NAIA poll and AP small college poll

The 1964 Alcorn A&M Braves football team represented Alcorn A&M College (now known as Alcorn State University) as a member of the Southwestern Athletic Conference (SWAC) during the 1964 NCAA College Division football season. Led by first-year head coach Marino Casem, the Braves compiled an overall record of 5–5, with a conference record of 3–4, and finished tied for fourth in the SWAC.

== Schedule ==
Date	Opponent	Site	Result	Attendance	Source
September 19	at Grambling	Grambling Stadium; Grambling, LA	L 14–32		
September 26	Wiley	Henderson Stadium; Lorman, MS	W 14–6		
October 3	Rust*	Henderson Stadium; Lorman, MS	W 14–6		
October 10	Jackson State	Henderson Stadium; Lorman, MS (rivalry)	W 27–8	4,000	
October 17	Texas Southern	Henderson Stadium; Lorman, MS	L 24–26		
October 24	Southern	Henderson Stadium; Lorman, MS	W 21–3		
October 31	at Arkansas AM&N	Pumphrey Stadium; Pine Bluff, AR	L 0–28		
November 7	at Mississippi Valley State*	Magnolia Stadium; Itta Bena, MS	L 6–8		
November 14	at No. 4 Prairie View A&M	Edward L. Blackshear Field; Prairie View, TX	L 0–44	10,000	
November 21	Mississippi Industrial*	Henderson Stadium; Lorman, MS	W 50–0		
*Non-conference game; Rankings from AP Poll released prior to the game
