= 1964 New Hampshire Wildcats football team =

American college football season

1964 New Hampshire Wildcats football
- Conference: Yankee Conference
- Record: 1–6–1 (0–4–1 Yankee)
- Head coach: Chief Boston (15th season)
- Home stadium: Cowell Stadium

1964 Yankee Conference football standings
| | Conf. | | | | | Overall |
| Team | W | | L | | T | W | | L | | T |
|---|---|---|---|---|---|---|---|---|---|---|
| UMass $ | 5 | – | 0 | – | 0 | 8 | – | 2 | – | 0 |
| Vermont | 3 | – | 1 | – | 0 | 7 | – | 1 | – | 0 |
| Connecticut | 2 | – | 1 | – | 1 | 4 | – | 4 | – | 1 |
| Maine | 2 | – | 3 | – | 0 | 5 | – | 3 | – | 0 |
| Rhode Island | 1 | – | 4 | – | 0 | 3 | – | 7 | – | 0 |
| New Hampshire | 0 | – | 4 | – | 1 | 1 | – | 6 | – | 1 |
$ – Conference champion

The 1964 New Hampshire Wildcats football team was an American football team that represented the University of New Hampshire as a member of the Yankee Conference during the 1964 NCAA College Division football season. In its 15th year under head coach Chief Boston, the team compiled a 1–6–1 record (0–4–1 against conference opponents) and finished last out of six teams in the Yankee Conference.

== Schedule ==
| Date | Opponent | Site | Result | Attendance | Source |
|---|---|---|---|---|---|
| September 26 | Dartmouth* | Cowell Stadium; Durham, NH (rivalry) | L 0–40 | 10,000 | |
| October 3 | Rhode Island | Cowell Stadium; Durham, NH | L 8–22 | 4,000–4,500 | |
| October 10 | at Maine | Alumni Field; Orono, ME (Battle for the Brice–Cowell Musket) | L 18–33 | 6,948–7,000 | |
| October 17 | Vermont | Cowell Stadium; Durham, NH | L 0–40 | 8,000–8,200 | |
| October 24 | at Northeastern* | Parsons Field; Brookline, MA | L 20–25 | 7,286 | |
| October 31 | Connecticut | Cowell Stadium; Durham, NH | T 0–0 | 3,500 | |
| November 7 | Springfield* | Cowell Stadium; Durham, NH | W 16–14 | 4,500 | |
| November 14 | at No. 8 UMass | Alumni Stadium; Hadley, MA (rivalry) | L 0–47 | 7,500 | |
*Non-conference game; Rankings from AP Poll released prior to the game
