= 1964 Gettysburg Bullets football team =

American college football season

1964 Gettysburg Bullets football

MAC University Division champion
- Conference: Middle Atlantic Conference
- University Division
- Record: 7–2 (5–1 MAC)
- Head coach: Eugene M. Haas (8th season)
- Captains: Ken Snyder; Mark Snyder
- Home stadium: Memorial Field

1964 Middle Atlantic Conference football standings
	Conf.					Overall
Team	W		L		T	W		L		T
University Division
Gettysburg x	5	–	1	–	0	7	–	2	–	0
Bucknell	4	–	1	–	0	7	–	2	–	0
Temple	4	–	1	–	0	7	–	2	–	0
Delaware	3	–	3	–	0	4	–	5	–	0
Lafayette	0	–	4	–	2	0	–	7	–	2
Hofstra	0	–	3	–	1	6	–	3	–	1
Lehigh	0	–	3	–	1	1	–	7	–	1
Northern College Division
Wagner x	5	–	0	–	0	10	–	0	–	0
Albright	6	–	1	–	0	8	–	1	–	0
Juniata	3	–	3	–	0	4	–	4	–	0
Moravian	3	–	4	–	0	4	–	4	–	0
Upsala	2	–	4	–	0	3	–	5	–	0
Wilkes	1	–	5	–	0	1	–	6	–	0
Lycoming	1	–	5	–	0	1	–	7	–	0
Susquehanna *	2	–	0	–	0	7	–	2	–	0
Southern College Division
Franklin & Marshall x	7	–	0	–	0	8	–	0	–	0
Drexel	4	–	1	–	0	7	–	2	–	0
Muhlenberg	5	–	3	–	0	5	–	4	–	0
Lebanon Valley	4	–	4	–	0	4	–	4	–	0
Pennsylvania Military	4	–	4	–	0	4	–	5	–	0
Swarthmore	3	–	3	–	0	3	–	4	–	0
Dickinson	4	–	5	–	0	4	–	5	–	0
Western Maryland	2	–	4	–	0	4	–	5	–	0
Johns Hopkins	2	–	4	–	0	2	–	6	–	0
Ursinus	2	–	5	–	0	2	–	6	–	0
Haverford	0	–	5	–	0	0	–	6	–	1
West Chester *	0	–	0	–	0	6	–	2	–	0
x – Division champion/co-champions; * – Ineligible for championship due to insufficient conference games

The 1964 Gettysburg Bullets football team was an American football team that represented Gettysburg College during the 1964 NCAA College Division football season. The team was the champion of the University Division of the Middle Atlantic Conference (MAC).

During their eighth year under head coach Eugene M. Haas, the Bullets compiled a 7–2 record. Ken Snyder and Mark Snyder were the team captains.

Following an upset win against top-ranked Delaware, its third in a row, Gettysburg entered the UPI small college coaches poll, ranked No. 10 in the nation. The team moved up and down in the rankings until the end of the season, and was also considered a top contender for the Lambert Cup. A season-ending loss to Temple ruined its hopes of an undefeated conference record, however, and dropped Gettysburg out of the national top twenty. The Lambert Cup instead went to division rival Bucknell.

Gettysburg went 5–1 against MAC University Division foes, the best winning percentage in the seven-team circuit. This was Gettysburg's only first-place finish during its 12-year tenure in the MAC University Division.

The Bullets played home games at Memorial Field in Gettysburg, Pennsylvania. The October 24 game was the team's final game at this facility, which was replaced the next year by Musselman Stadium.

== Schedule ==
Date	Opponent	Rank	Site	Result	Attendance	Source
September 19	Hofstra		Memorial Field; Gettysburg, PA	W 27–7	4,000	
September 26	at Bucknell		Memorial Stadium; Lewisburg, PA	W 12–7	6,500–7,000	
October 3	No. 1 Delaware		Memorial Field; Gettysburg, PA	W 22–19	5,000	
October 10	at Albright*	No. 10	Albright College Stadium; Reading, PA	L 15–19	8,000	
October 17	Lehigh	No. 16	Memorial Field; Gettysburg, PA	W 39–7	5,300	
October 24	Muhlenberg*	No. 11	Memorial Field; Gettysburg, PA	W 51–20	5,100	
October 31	at Lafayette	No. 11	Fisher Field; Easton, PA	W 21–3	6,000	
November 7	at Juniata*	No. 9	College Field; Huntingdon, PA	W 41–17	3,200	
November 14	at Temple	No. 9	Temple Stadium; Philadelphia, PA	L 20–32	9,500	
*Non-conference game; Rankings from UPI Coaches Poll released prior to the game

== See also ==
- 1966 Gettysburg Bullets football team, successor to this team that won the Lambert Cup.
