= 1964 Delaware Fightin' Blue Hens football team =

American college football season

1964 Delaware Fightin' Blue Hens football
- Conference: Middle Atlantic Conference
- University Division
- Record: 4–5 (3–3 MAC)
- Head coach: David M. Nelson (14th season)
- Captain: Ron Bianco
- Home stadium: Delaware Stadium

1964 Middle Atlantic Conference football standings
	Conf.					Overall
Team	W		L		T	W		L		T
University Division
Gettysburg x	5	–	1	–	0	7	–	2	–	0
Bucknell	4	–	1	–	0	7	–	2	–	0
Temple	4	–	1	–	0	7	–	2	–	0
Delaware	3	–	3	–	0	4	–	5	–	0
Lafayette	0	–	4	–	2	0	–	7	–	2
Hofstra	0	–	3	–	1	6	–	3	–	1
Lehigh	0	–	3	–	1	1	–	7	–	1
Northern College Division
Wagner x	5	–	0	–	0	10	–	0	–	0
Albright	6	–	1	–	0	8	–	1	–	0
Juniata	3	–	3	–	0	4	–	4	–	0
Moravian	3	–	4	–	0	4	–	4	–	0
Upsala	2	–	4	–	0	3	–	5	–	0
Wilkes	1	–	5	–	0	1	–	6	–	0
Lycoming	1	–	5	–	0	1	–	7	–	0
Susquehanna *	2	–	0	–	0	7	–	2	–	0
Southern College Division
Franklin & Marshall x	7	–	0	–	0	8	–	0	–	0
Drexel	4	–	1	–	0	7	–	2	–	0
Muhlenberg	5	–	3	–	0	5	–	4	–	0
Lebanon Valley	4	–	4	–	0	4	–	4	–	0
Pennsylvania Military	4	–	4	–	0	4	–	5	–	0
Swarthmore	3	–	3	–	0	3	–	4	–	0
Dickinson	4	–	5	–	0	4	–	5	–	0
Western Maryland	2	–	4	–	0	4	–	5	–	0
Johns Hopkins	2	–	4	–	0	2	–	6	–	0
Ursinus	2	–	5	–	0	2	–	6	–	0
Haverford	0	–	5	–	0	0	–	6	–	1
West Chester *	0	–	0	–	0	6	–	2	–	0
x – Division champion/co-champions; * – Ineligible for championship due to insufficient conference games

The 1964 Delaware Fightin' Blue Hens football team was an American football team that represented the University of Delaware in the Middle Atlantic Conference during the 1964 NCAA College Division football season. In its 14th season under head coach David M. Nelson, the team compiled a 4–5 record (3–3 against MAC opponents) and outscored opponents by a total of 170 to 168. Ron Bianco was the team captain. The team played its home games at Delaware Stadium in Newark, Delaware.

== Schedule ==
Date	Opponent	Rank	Site	Result	Attendance	Source
September 26	Hofstra		Delaware Stadium; Newark, DE	W 36–7	9,433	
October 3	at Gettysburg	No. 1	Memorial Field; Gettysburg, PA	L 19–22	5,000	
October 10	Lafayette	No. 6	Delaware Stadium; Newark, DE	W 28–0	9,389	
October 17	at Villanova*	No. 7	Villanova Stadium; Villanova, PA (rivalry)	L 0–34	10,200	
October 24	at Lehigh	No. 12	Taylor Stadium; Bethlehem, PA (rivalry)	W 46–8	7,000	
October 31	at Buffalo*	No. 12	Rotary Field; Buffalo, NY	L 0–37	8,200–8,253	
November 7	at Temple		Temple Stadium; Philadelphia, PA	L 0–21	7,220	
November 14	Rutgers*		Delaware Stadium; Newark, DE	W 27–18	8,266	
November 21	Bucknell		Delaware Stadium; Newark, DE	L 14–21	9,182	
*Non-conference game; Rankings from UPI Coaches Poll released prior to the game
