= 1964 Maine Black Bears football team =

American college football season

1964 Maine Black Bears football

MIAA champion
- Conference: Yankee Conference, Maine Intercollegiate Athletic Association
- Record: 5–3 (2–3 Yankee, 3–0 MIAA)
- Head coach: Harold Westerman (14th season)
- Captains: Michael Haley; Ernest Smith
- Home stadium: Alumni Field

1964 Yankee Conference football standings
	Conf.					Overall
Team	W		L		T	W		L		T
UMass $	5	–	0	–	0	8	–	2	–	0
Vermont	3	–	1	–	0	7	–	1	–	0
Connecticut	2	–	1	–	1	4	–	4	–	1
Maine	2	–	3	–	0	5	–	3	–	0
Rhode Island	1	–	4	–	0	3	–	7	–	0
New Hampshire	0	–	4	–	1	1	–	6	–	1
$ – Conference champion

The 1964 Maine Black Bears football team was an American football team that represented the University of Maine as a member of the Yankee Conference and Maine Intercollegiate Athletic Association during the 1964 NCAA College Division football season. In its 14th season under head coach Harold Westerman, the team compiled a 5–3 record (2–3 against Yankee Conference and 3–0 against MIAA opponents) and finished fourth out of the six teams in the Yankee Conference. The team played its home games at Alumni Field in Orono, Maine. Michael Haley and Ernest Smith were the team captains.

== Schedule ==
Date	Opponent	Site	Result	Attendance	Source
September 19	at UMass	Alumni Field; Amherst, MA	L 0–6	10,280–10,500	
September 26	Rhode Island	Alumni Field; Orono, ME	W 23–15	5,200–6,000	
October 3	at Vermont	Centennial Field; Burlington, VT	L 7–14	7,500	
October 10	New Hampshire	Alumni Field; Orono, ME	W 33–18	6,948–7,000	
October 17	at Connecticut	Memorial Stadium; Storrs, CT	L 13–14	7,500–7,563	
October 24	Bates	Alumni Field; Orono, ME	W 38–7	4,000	
October 31	Colby	Alumni Field; Orono, ME	W 42–7	2,800	
November 7	at Bowdoin	Whittier Field; Brunswick, ME	W 22–0	8,000	
