= 1964 Penn Quakers football team =

American college football season

1964 Penn Quakers football
- Conference: Ivy League
- Record: 1–8 (0–7 Ivy)
- Head coach: John Stiegman (5th season)
- Captain: Jim Riepe
- Home stadium: Franklin Field

1964 Ivy League football standings
	Conf.					Overall
Team	W		L		T	W		L		T
Princeton $	7	–	0	–	0	9	–	0	–	0
Harvard	5	–	2	–	0	6	–	3	–	0
Yale	4	–	2	–	1	6	–	2	–	1
Dartmouth	4	–	3	–	0	6	–	3	–	0
Cornell	3	–	4	–	0	3	–	5	–	1
Brown	3	–	4	–	0	5	–	4	–	0
Columbia	1	–	5	–	1	2	–	6	–	1
Penn	0	–	7	–	0	1	–	8	–	0
$ – Conference champion

The 1964 Penn Quakers football team was an American football team that represented the University of Pennsylvania during the 1964 NCAA University Division football season. Penn finished last in the Ivy League.

In its fifth and final year under head coach John Stiegman, this team compiled a 1–8 record and was outscored 222 to 48. Jim Riepe was the team captain.

Penn's 0–7 conference record was the worst in the Ivy League. The Quakers were outscored 206 to 28 by Ivy opponents.

Penn played its home games at Franklin Field adjacent to the university's campus in Philadelphia, Pennsylvania.

== Schedule ==
Date	Opponent	Site	Result	Attendance	Source
September 26	Lehigh*	Franklin Field; Philadelphia, PA	W 13–6	8,446	
October 3	at Brown	Brown Stadium; Providence, RI	L 0–3	12,000	
October 10	at Cornell	Schoellkopf Field; Ithaca, NY (rivalry)	L 0–33	14,000	
October 17	Rutgers*	Franklin Field; Philadelphia, PA	L 7–10	7,178	
October 24	Princeton	Franklin Field; Philadelphia, PA (rivalry)	L 0–55	14,982	
October 31	at Harvard	Harvard Stadium; Boston, MA (rivalry)	L 0–34	10,000	
November 7	Yale	Franklin Field; Philadelphia, PA	L 9–21	9,114	
November 14	at Columbia	Baker Field; New York, NY	L 12–33	9,363	
November 21	Dartmouth	Franklin Field; Philadelphia, PA	L 7–27	8,498	
*Non-conference game
