= 1964 Cornell Big Red football team =

American college football season

1964 Cornell Big Red football
- Conference: Ivy League
- Record: 3–5–1 (3–4 Ivy)
- Head coach: Tom Harp (4th season)
- Captain: Clarence Jentes
- Home stadium: Schoellkopf Field

1964 Ivy League football standings
	Conf.					Overall
Team	W		L		T	W		L		T
Princeton $	7	–	0	–	0	9	–	0	–	0
Harvard	5	–	2	–	0	6	–	3	–	0
Yale	4	–	2	–	1	6	–	2	–	1
Dartmouth	4	–	3	–	0	6	–	3	–	0
Cornell	3	–	4	–	0	3	–	5	–	1
Brown	3	–	4	–	0	5	–	4	–	0
Columbia	1	–	5	–	1	2	–	6	–	1
Penn	0	–	7	–	0	1	–	8	–	0
$ – Conference champion

The 1964 Cornell Big Red football team was an American football team that represented Cornell University during the 1964 NCAA University Division football season. Cornell tied for fifth in the Ivy League .

In its fourth season under head coach Tom Harp, the team compiled a 3–5–1 record but outscored opponents 196 to 139. Clarence Jentes was the team captain.

Cornell's 3–4 conference record tied for fifth place in the Ivy League standings. The Big Red outscored Ivy opponents 184 to 122.

Cornell played its home games at Schoellkopf Field in Ithaca, New York.

== Schedule ==
Date	Opponent	Site	Result	Attendance	Source
September 26	Buffalo*	Schoellkopf Field; Ithaca, NY	T 9–9	17,000	
October 3	at Colgate*	Colgate Athletic Field; Hamilton, NY (rivalry)	L 3–8	11,847	
October 10	Penn	Schoellkopf Field; Ithaca, NY (rivalry)	W 33–0	14,000	
October 17	at Harvard	Harvard Stadium; Boston, MA	L 0–16	8,000	
October 24	Yale	Schoellkopf Field; Ithaca, NY	L 21–23	18,000	
October 31	at Columbia	Baker Field; New York, NY (rivalry)	W 57–20	11,333	
November 7	at Brown	Brown Stadium; Providence, RI	L 28–31	14,400	
November 14	Dartmouth	Schoellkopf Field; Ithaca, NY (rivalry)	W 33–15	16,000	
November 21	at Princeton	Palmer Stadium; Princeton, NJ	L 12–17	32,000	
*Non-conference game
