= 1964 Princeton Tigers football team =

American college football season

1964 Princeton Tigers football

Ivy League champion
- Conference: Ivy League

Ranking
- Coaches: No. 13
- Record: 9–0 (7–0 Ivy)
- Head coach: Dick Colman (8th season)
- Captain: Cosmo Iacavazzi
- Home stadium: Palmer Stadium

1964 Ivy League football standings
	Conf.					Overall
Team	W		L		T	W		L		T
Princeton $	7	–	0	–	0	9	–	0	–	0
Harvard	5	–	2	–	0	6	–	3	–	0
Yale	4	–	2	–	1	6	–	2	–	1
Dartmouth	4	–	3	–	0	6	–	3	–	0
Cornell	3	–	4	–	0	3	–	5	–	1
Brown	3	–	4	–	0	5	–	4	–	0
Columbia	1	–	5	–	1	2	–	6	–	1
Penn	0	–	7	–	0	1	–	8	–	0
$ – Conference champion

The 1964 Princeton Tigers football team was an American football team that represented Princeton University during the 1964 NCAA University Division football season. A year after sharing an Ivy League co-championship, Princeton went undefeated to win the league outright.

In their eighth year under head coach Dick Colman, the Tigers compiled a 9–0 record and outscored opponents 216 to 53. Cosmo Iacavazzi, who would later be inducted into the College Football Hall of Fame, was the team captain. At the end of the year, the Tigers were ranked No. 13 in the nation the UPI Coaches Poll.

Princeton's 7–0 conference record was the best in the Ivy League standings. The Tigers outscored Ivy opponents 197 to 46.

Princeton played its home games at Palmer Stadium on the university campus in Princeton, New Jersey.

== Schedule ==
Date	Opponent	Site	Result	Attendance	Source
September 26	Rutgers*	Palmer Stadium; Princeton, NJ (rivalry)	W 10–7	38,000	
October 3	Columbia	Palmer Stadium; Princeton, NJ	W 23–13	22,000	
October 10	at Dartmouth	Memorial Field; Hanover, NH	W 37–7	15,580	
October 17	Colgate*	Palmer Stadium; Princeton, NJ	W 9–0	20,000	
October 24	at Penn	Franklin Field; Philadelphia, PA (rivalry)	W 55–0	14,982	
October 31	at Brown	Brown Stadium; Providence, RI	W 14–0	16,700	
November 7	Harvard	Palmer Stadium; Princeton, NJ (rivalry)	W 16–0	39,000	
November 14	at Yale	Yale Bowl; New Haven, CT (rivalry)	W 35–14	60,173	
November 21	Cornell	Palmer Stadium; Princeton, NJ	W 17–12	32,000	
*Non-conference game
