= 1964 Brown Bears football team =

American college football season

1964 Brown Bears football
- Conference: Ivy League
- Record: 5–4 (3–4 Ivy)
- Head coach: John McLaughry (6th season)
- Captains: Ralph Duerre; John Parry
- Home stadium: Brown Stadium

1964 Ivy League football standings
	Conf.					Overall
Team	W		L		T	W		L		T
Princeton $	7	–	0	–	0	9	–	0	–	0
Harvard	5	–	2	–	0	6	–	3	–	0
Yale	4	–	2	–	1	6	–	2	–	1
Dartmouth	4	–	3	–	0	6	–	3	–	0
Cornell	3	–	4	–	0	3	–	5	–	1
Brown	3	–	4	–	0	5	–	4	–	0
Columbia	1	–	5	–	1	2	–	6	–	1
Penn	0	–	7	–	0	1	–	8	–	0
$ – Conference champion

The 1964 Brown Bears football team was an American football team that represented Brown University during the 1964 NCAA University Division football season. Brown tied for fourth in the Ivy League.

In their sixth season under head coach John McLaughry, the Bears compiled a 5–4 record and outscored opponents 119 to 117. Ralph Duerre and John Perry were the team captains.

The Bears' 3–4 conference record tied for fourth-best in the Ivy League standings. They were outscored by Ivy opponents 100 to 69.

Brown played its home games at Brown Stadium in Providence, Rhode Island.

== Schedule ==
Date	Opponent	Site	Result	Attendance	Source
September 26	Lafayette*	Brown Stadium; Providence, RI	W 20–3	9,200	
October 3	Penn	Brown Stadium; Providence, RI	W 3–0	12,000	
October 10	at Yale	Yale Bowl; New Haven, CT	L 7–15	30,728	
October 17	at Dartmouth	Memorial Field; Hanover, NH	L 14–24	9,000	
October 24	Rhode Island*	Brown Stadium; Providence, RI (rivalry)	W 30–14	14,000–15,000	
October 31	Princeton^{†}	Brown Stadium; Providence, RI	L 0–14	16,700	
November 7	Cornell	Brown Stadium; Providence, RI	W 31–28	14,400	
November 14	at Harvard	Harvard Stadium; Boston, MA	L 7–19	15,000	
November 21	Columbia	Brown Stadium; Providence, RI	W 7–0	8,100	
*Non-conference game; ^{†}Homecoming
