= 1964 Dartmouth Indians football team =

American college football season

1964 Dartmouth Indians football
- Conference: Ivy League
- Record: 6–3 (4–3 Ivy)
- Head coach: Bob Blackman (10th season)
- Captain: John McLean
- Home stadium: Memorial Field

1964 Ivy League football standings
| | Conf. | | | | | Overall |
| Team | W | | L | | T | W | | L | | T |
|---|---|---|---|---|---|---|---|---|---|---|
| Princeton $ | 7 | – | 0 | – | 0 | 9 | – | 0 | – | 0 |
| Harvard | 5 | – | 2 | – | 0 | 6 | – | 3 | – | 0 |
| Yale | 4 | – | 2 | – | 1 | 6 | – | 2 | – | 1 |
| Dartmouth | 4 | – | 3 | – | 0 | 6 | – | 3 | – | 0 |
| Cornell | 3 | – | 4 | – | 0 | 3 | – | 5 | – | 1 |
| Brown | 3 | – | 4 | – | 0 | 5 | – | 4 | – | 0 |
| Columbia | 1 | – | 5 | – | 1 | 2 | – | 6 | – | 1 |
| Penn | 0 | – | 7 | – | 0 | 1 | – | 8 | – | 0 |
$ – Conference champion

The 1964 Dartmouth Indians football team was an American football team that represented Dartmouth College during the 1964 NCAA University Division football season. After two straight first-place finishes in 1962 and '63, the Indians dropped to fourth in the Ivy League.

In their tenth season under head coach Bob Blackman, the Indians compiled a 6–3 record and outscored opponents 235 to 135. John McLean was the team captain.

The Indians' 4–3 conference record placed fourth in the Ivy League standings. The Indians outscored Ivy opponents 167 to 129.

Dartmouth played its home games at Memorial Field on the college campus in Hanover, New Hampshire.

== Schedule ==
| Date | Opponent | Site | Result | Attendance | Source |
|---|---|---|---|---|---|
| September 26 | at New Hampshire* | Cowell Stadium; Durham, NH (rivalry) | W 40–0 | 10,000 | |
| October 3 | Boston University* | Memorial Field; Hanover, NH | W 28–6 | 9,500 | |
| October 10 | Princeton | Memorial Field; Hanover, NH | L 7–37 | 15,580 | |
| October 17 | Brown | Memorial Field; Hanover, NH | W 24–14 | 9,000 | |
| October 24 | at Harvard | Harvard Stadium; Boston, MA (rivalry) | W 48–0 | 32,500 | |
| October 31 | at Yale | Yale Bowl; New Haven, CT | L 15–24 | 47,533 | |
| November 7 | Columbia | Memorial Field; Hanover, NH | W 31–14 | 10,543 | |
| November 14 | at Cornell | Schoellkopf Field; Ithaca, NY (rivalry) | L 15–33 | 16,000 | |
| November 21 | at Penn | Franklin Field; Philadelphia, PA | W 27–7 | 8,498 | |
*Non-conference game
