= 1964 Temple Owls football team =

American college football season

1964 Temple Owls football
- Conference: Middle Atlantic Conference
- University Division
- Record: 7–2 (4–1 MAC)
- Head coach: George Makris (5th season)
- Home stadium: Temple Stadium

1964 Middle Atlantic Conference football standings
	Conf.					Overall
Team	W		L		T	W		L		T
University Division
Gettysburg x	5	–	1	–	0	7	–	2	–	0
Bucknell	4	–	1	–	0	7	–	2	–	0
Temple	4	–	1	–	0	7	–	2	–	0
Delaware	3	–	3	–	0	4	–	5	–	0
Lafayette	0	–	4	–	2	0	–	7	–	2
Hofstra	0	–	3	–	1	6	–	3	–	1
Lehigh	0	–	3	–	1	1	–	7	–	1
Northern College Division
Wagner x	5	–	0	–	0	10	–	0	–	0
Albright	6	–	1	–	0	8	–	1	–	0
Juniata	3	–	3	–	0	4	–	4	–	0
Moravian	3	–	4	–	0	4	–	4	–	0
Upsala	2	–	4	–	0	3	–	5	–	0
Wilkes	1	–	5	–	0	1	–	6	–	0
Lycoming	1	–	5	–	0	1	–	7	–	0
Susquehanna *	2	–	0	–	0	7	–	2	–	0
Southern College Division
Franklin & Marshall x	7	–	0	–	0	8	–	0	–	0
Drexel	4	–	1	–	0	7	–	2	–	0
Muhlenberg	5	–	3	–	0	5	–	4	–	0
Lebanon Valley	4	–	4	–	0	4	–	4	–	0
Pennsylvania Military	4	–	4	–	0	4	–	5	–	0
Swarthmore	3	–	3	–	0	3	–	4	–	0
Dickinson	4	–	5	–	0	4	–	5	–	0
Western Maryland	2	–	4	–	0	4	–	5	–	0
Johns Hopkins	2	–	4	–	0	2	–	6	–	0
Ursinus	2	–	5	–	0	2	–	6	–	0
Haverford	0	–	5	–	0	0	–	6	–	1
West Chester *	0	–	0	–	0	6	–	2	–	0
x – Division champion/co-champions; * – Ineligible for championship due to insufficient conference games

The 1964 Temple Owls football team was an American football team that represented Temple University as a member of the Middle Atlantic Conference (MAC) during the 1964 NCAA College Division football season. In its fifth season under head coach George Makris, the team compiled a 7–2 record (4–1 against MAC opponents) and finished third out of seven teams in the MAC's University Division. The team played its home games at Temple Stadium in Philadelphia.

== Schedule ==
Date	Opponent	Site	Result	Attendance	Source
September 26	Merchant Marine*	Temple Stadium; Philadelphia, PA	W 34–9	12,000	
October 3	Southern Connecticut*	Temple Stadium; Philadelphia, PA	W 22–6	9,000	
October 10	at Boston University*	Nickerson Field; Boston, MA	W 44–13	3,500	
October 17	at Lafayette	Fisher Stadium; Easton, PA	W 38–18	4,000	
October 24	at Connecticut*	Memorial Stadium; Storrs, CT	L 7–25	8,635	
October 31	No. 14 Bucknell	Temple Stadium; Philadelphia, PA	L 28–31	11,000	
November 7	at Delaware	Delaware Stadium; Newark, DE	W 21–0	7,200–7,220	
November 14	No. 9 Gettysburg	Temple Stadium; Philadelphia, PA	W 32–20	9,500	
November 21	Hofstra	Temple Stadium; Philadelphia, PA	W 21–6	6,500	
*Non-conference game; Rankings from UPI Poll released prior to the game
