= 1964 Wagner Seahawks football team =

American college football season

1964 Wagner Seahawks football

MAC Northern College Division champion
- Conference: Middle Atlantic Conference
- Northern College Division
- Record: 10–0 (5–0 MAC)
- Head coach: Robert C. Hicks (3rd season)
- Home stadium: Grymes Hill Stadium

1964 Middle Atlantic Conference football standings
	Conf.					Overall
Team	W		L		T	W		L		T
University Division
Gettysburg x	5	–	1	–	0	7	–	2	–	0
Bucknell	4	–	1	–	0	7	–	2	–	0
Temple	4	–	1	–	0	7	–	2	–	0
Delaware	3	–	3	–	0	4	–	5	–	0
Lafayette	0	–	4	–	2	0	–	7	–	2
Hofstra	0	–	3	–	1	6	–	3	–	1
Lehigh	0	–	3	–	1	1	–	7	–	1
Northern College Division
Wagner x	5	–	0	–	0	10	–	0	–	0
Albright	6	–	1	–	0	8	–	1	–	0
Juniata	3	–	3	–	0	4	–	4	–	0
Moravian	3	–	4	–	0	4	–	4	–	0
Upsala	2	–	4	–	0	3	–	5	–	0
Wilkes	1	–	5	–	0	1	–	6	–	0
Lycoming	1	–	5	–	0	1	–	7	–	0
Susquehanna *	2	–	0	–	0	7	–	2	–	0
Southern College Division
Franklin & Marshall x	7	–	0	–	0	8	–	0	–	0
Drexel	4	–	1	–	0	7	–	2	–	0
Muhlenberg	5	–	3	–	0	5	–	4	–	0
Lebanon Valley	4	–	4	–	0	4	–	4	–	0
Pennsylvania Military	4	–	4	–	0	4	–	5	–	0
Swarthmore	3	–	3	–	0	3	–	4	–	0
Dickinson	4	–	5	–	0	4	–	5	–	0
Western Maryland	2	–	4	–	0	4	–	5	–	0
Johns Hopkins	2	–	4	–	0	2	–	6	–	0
Ursinus	2	–	5	–	0	2	–	6	–	0
Haverford	0	–	5	–	0	0	–	6	–	1
West Chester *	0	–	0	–	0	6	–	2	–	0
x – Division champion/co-champions; * – Ineligible for championship due to insufficient conference games

The 1964 Wagner Seahawks football team was an American football team that represented Wagner College as a member of the Middle Atlantic Conference (MAC) during the 1964 NCAA College Division football season. In their third year under head coach Robert C. Hicks, the Seahawks compiled a perfect 10–0 record (5–0 in conference games) and won the MAC Northern College Division championship. It was one of only three Wagner football teams (along with the 1960 and 1967 teams) to conclude its season with an undefeated record.

On offense, the Seahawks scored 202 points and gained 3,471 yards of total offense (1,661 rushing, 1,810 passing). On defense, they gave up 67 points and 1,837 yards of total offense (1,072 rushing, 765 passing).

The team's individual statistical leaders included senior quarterback Dan Coughlin with 1,810 passing yards and 14 passing touchdowns; senior halfback Cliff Lish with 432 rushing yards; junior end Rich Kotite with 56 passes for 943 yards and 42 points scored; and junior halfback Chuck DiStallo with 42 points scored. Kotite, a transfer from Miami, was selected as a second-team player on the 1964 Little All-America college football team.

The team played its home games at Grymes Hill Stadium in the Grymes Hill neighborhood of Staten Island, New York City.

The team was honored in 2014 with a ceremony at Wagner.

== Schedule ==
Date	Opponent	Site	Result	Attendance	Source
September 19	at Trenton State*	Trenton, NJ	W 13–0	3,000	
September 26	at Western Maryland	Westminster, MD	W 34–16	1,500	
October 3	Merchant Marine*	Grymes Hill Stadium; Staten Island, NY	W 13–6		
October 10	at Moravian	Bethlehem, PA	W 20–7	1,500	
October 17	Drexel	Grymes Hill Stadium; Staten Island, NY	W 21–0		
October 24	Albright	Grymes Hill Stadium; Staten Island, NY	W 27–8		
October 31	at C. W. Post	Post Field; Brookville, NY	W 7–6		
November 7	Hamilton*	Grymes Hill Stadium; Staten Island, NY	W 41–8		
November 14	at Springfield*	Springfield, MA	W 12–7	5,000	
November 21	Upsala	Grymes Hill Stadium; Staten Island, NY	W 14–9		
*Non-conference game
