= 1964 Bucknell Bison football team =

American college football season

1964 Bucknell Bison football

Lambert Cup
- Conference: Middle Atlantic Conference
- University Division
- Record: 7–2 (4–1 MAC)
- Head coach: Bob Odell (7th season)
- Captain: John Barron
- Home stadium: Memorial Stadium

1964 Middle Atlantic Conference football standings
	Conf.					Overall
Team	W		L		T	W		L		T
University Division
Gettysburg x	5	–	1	–	0	7	–	2	–	0
Bucknell	4	–	1	–	0	7	–	2	–	0
Temple	4	–	1	–	0	7	–	2	–	0
Delaware	3	–	3	–	0	4	–	5	–	0
Lafayette	0	–	4	–	2	0	–	7	–	2
Hofstra	0	–	3	–	1	6	–	3	–	1
Lehigh	0	–	3	–	1	1	–	7	–	1
Northern College Division
Wagner x	5	–	0	–	0	10	–	0	–	0
Albright	6	–	1	–	0	8	–	1	–	0
Juniata	3	–	3	–	0	4	–	4	–	0
Moravian	3	–	4	–	0	4	–	4	–	0
Upsala	2	–	4	–	0	3	–	5	–	0
Wilkes	1	–	5	–	0	1	–	6	–	0
Lycoming	1	–	5	–	0	1	–	7	–	0
Susquehanna *	2	–	0	–	0	7	–	2	–	0
Southern College Division
Franklin & Marshall x	7	–	0	–	0	8	–	0	–	0
Drexel	4	–	1	–	0	7	–	2	–	0
Muhlenberg	5	–	3	–	0	5	–	4	–	0
Lebanon Valley	4	–	4	–	0	4	–	4	–	0
Pennsylvania Military	4	–	4	–	0	4	–	5	–	0
Swarthmore	3	–	3	–	0	3	–	4	–	0
Dickinson	4	–	5	–	0	4	–	5	–	0
Western Maryland	2	–	4	–	0	4	–	5	–	0
Johns Hopkins	2	–	4	–	0	2	–	6	–	0
Ursinus	2	–	5	–	0	2	–	6	–	0
Haverford	0	–	5	–	0	0	–	6	–	1
West Chester *	0	–	0	–	0	6	–	2	–	0
x – Division champion/co-champions; * – Ineligible for championship due to insufficient conference games

The 1964 Bucknell Bison football team was an American football team that represented Bucknell University during the 1964 NCAA College Division football season. Bucknell was awarded the Lambert Cup as the best small-college football team in the East.

In its seventh and final season under head coach Bob Odell, the team compiled a 7–2 record, 4–1 against division opponents. Despite winning the Lambert Cup, Bucknell finished second in the University Division of the Middle Atlantic Conference. John Barron was the team captain.

The team played its home games at Memorial Stadium on the university campus in Lewisburg, Pennsylvania.

== Schedule ==
Date	Opponent	Rank	Site	Result	Attendance	Source
September 26	Gettysburg		Memorial Stadium; Lewisburg, PA	L 7–12	6,500–7,000	
October 3	at Harvard*		Harvard Stadium; Boston, MA	W 24–21	14,000	
October 10	at Ohio Wesleyan*		Selby Field; Delaware, OH	W 72–0	2,000	
October 17	Merchant Marine*		Memorial Stadium; Lewisburg, PA	W 37–0	7,000	
October 24	Lafayette^{†}	No. 18	Memorial Stadium; Lewisburg, PA	W 54–12	7,500–8,000	
October 31	at Temple	No. 14	Temple Stadium; Philadelphia, PA	W 31–28	11,000	
November 7	Colgate*	No. 16	Memorial Stadium; Lewisburg, PA	L 6–14	9,000	
November 14	at Lehigh		Taylor Stadium; Bethlehem, PA	W 3–0	4,500	
November 21	at Delaware		Delaware Stadium; Newark, DE	W 21–14	9,182	
*Non-conference game; ^{†}Homecoming; Rankings from UPI Poll released prior to the game
