= 1964 Rhode Island Rams football team =

American college football season

1964 Rhode Island Rams football
- Conference: Yankee Conference
- Record: 3–7 (1–4 Yankee)
- Head coach: Jack Zilly (2nd season)
- Home stadium: Meade Stadium

1964 Yankee Conference football standings
	Conf.					Overall
Team	W		L		T	W		L		T
UMass $	5	–	0	–	0	8	–	2	–	0
Vermont	3	–	1	–	0	7	–	1	–	0
Connecticut	2	–	1	–	1	4	–	4	–	1
Maine	2	–	3	–	0	5	–	3	–	0
Rhode Island	1	–	4	–	0	3	–	7	–	0
New Hampshire	0	–	4	–	1	1	–	6	–	1
$ – Conference champion

The 1964 Rhode Island Rams football team was an American football team that represented the University of Rhode Island as a member of the Yankee Conference during the 1964 NCAA College Division football season. In its second season under head coach Jack Zilly, the team compiled a 3–7 record (1–4 against conference opponents), finished in fifth place out of six teams in the Yankee Conference, and was outscored by a total of 186 to 127. The team played its home games at Meade Stadium in Kingston, Rhode Island.

== Schedule ==
Date	Opponent	Site	Result	Attendance	Source
September 18	Northeastern*	Meade Stadium; Kingston, RI	W 20–11	8,500	
September 26	at Maine	Alumni Field; Orono, ME	L 15–23	5,200–6,000	
October 3	at New Hampshire	Cowell Stadium; Durham, NH	W 22–8	4,000–4,500	
October 10	Vermont	Meade Stadium; Kingston, RI	L 8–16	10,300–10,318	
October 17	UMass	Meade Stadium; Kingston, RI	L 0–7	1,500–3,000	
October 24	at Brown*	Brown Stadium; Providence, RI (rivalry)	L 14–30	14,000–15,000	
October 31	at Springfield*	Springfield, MA	W 21–15	4,000	
November 7	Hofstra*	Meade Stadium; Kingston, RI	L 7–28	4,000–4,500	
November 14	at Connecticut	Memorial Stadium; Storrs, CT (rivalry)	L 7–28	11,000–11,825	
November 21	at Boston University*	Nickerson Field; Boston, MA	L 13–20	6,000	
*Non-conference game
