= 1964 Lehigh Engineers football team =

American college football season

1964 Lehigh Engineers football
- Conference: Middle Atlantic Conference
- University Division
- Record: 1–7–1 (0–3–1 MAC)
- Head coach: Mike Cooley (3rd season)
- Captains: Charles Ortlam; Joe Weiss
- Home stadium: Taylor Stadium

1964 Middle Atlantic Conference football standings
	Conf.					Overall
Team	W		L		T	W		L		T
University Division
Gettysburg x	5	–	1	–	0	7	–	2	–	0
Bucknell	4	–	1	–	0	7	–	2	–	0
Temple	4	–	1	–	0	7	–	2	–	0
Delaware	3	–	3	–	0	4	–	5	–	0
Lafayette	0	–	4	–	2	0	–	7	–	2
Hofstra	0	–	3	–	1	6	–	3	–	1
Lehigh	0	–	3	–	1	1	–	7	–	1
Northern College Division
Wagner x	5	–	0	–	0	10	–	0	–	0
Albright	6	–	1	–	0	8	–	1	–	0
Juniata	3	–	3	–	0	4	–	4	–	0
Moravian	3	–	4	–	0	4	–	4	–	0
Upsala	2	–	4	–	0	3	–	5	–	0
Wilkes	1	–	5	–	0	1	–	6	–	0
Lycoming	1	–	5	–	0	1	–	7	–	0
Susquehanna *	2	–	0	–	0	7	–	2	–	0
Southern College Division
Franklin & Marshall x	7	–	0	–	0	8	–	0	–	0
Drexel	4	–	1	–	0	7	–	2	–	0
Muhlenberg	5	–	3	–	0	5	–	4	–	0
Lebanon Valley	4	–	4	–	0	4	–	4	–	0
Pennsylvania Military	4	–	4	–	0	4	–	5	–	0
Swarthmore	3	–	3	–	0	3	–	4	–	0
Dickinson	4	–	5	–	0	4	–	5	–	0
Western Maryland	2	–	4	–	0	4	–	5	–	0
Johns Hopkins	2	–	4	–	0	2	–	6	–	0
Ursinus	2	–	5	–	0	2	–	6	–	0
Haverford	0	–	5	–	0	0	–	6	–	1
West Chester *	0	–	0	–	0	6	–	2	–	0
x – Division champion/co-champions; * – Ineligible for championship due to insufficient conference games

The 1964 Lehigh Engineers football team was an American football team that represented Lehigh University during the 1964 NCAA College Division football season. Lehigh tied for last in both the Middle Atlantic Conference, University Division, and in the Middle Three Conference.

In their third and final year under head coach Mike Cooley, the Engineers compiled a 1–7–1 record. Charles Ortlam and Joe Weiss were the team captains.

At 0–3–1 against MAC University Division foes, Lehigh was one of three teams without a win in conference play, along with Hofstra (0–3–1), playing its first year in the division, and Lafayette (0–4–2). Lehigh went 0–1–1 against the Middle Three, losing to Rutgers and tying Lafayette.

Lehigh played its home games at Taylor Stadium on the university campus in Bethlehem, Pennsylvania.

== Schedule ==
Date	Opponent	Site	Result	Attendance	Source
September 26	at Penn*	Franklin Field; Philadelphia, PA	L 6–13	8,446	
October 3	at Yale*	Yale Bowl; New Haven, CT	L 0–54	24,917	
October 10	Rutgers	Taylor Stadium; Bethlehem, PA	L 7–20	7,500	
October 17	at No. 16 Gettysburg	Memorial Field; Gettysburg, PA	L 7–39	5,300	
October 24	No. 12 Delaware	Taylor Stadium; Bethlehem, PA (rivalry)	L 8–46	7,000	
October 31	at Colgate*	Colgate Athletic Field; Hamilton, NY	L 0–41	5,000	
November 7	Davidson*	Taylor Stadium; Bethlehem, PA	W 13–10	8,000	
November 14	Bucknell	Taylor Stadium; Bethlehem, PA	L 0–3	4,500	
November 21	at Lafayette	Fisher Field; Easton, PA (The Rivalry)	T 6–6	19,000	
*Non-conference game; Rankings from UPI Poll released prior to the game
