= George H. Storck =

American football coach

Biographical details
- Born: October 11, 1930; Plattsburgh, New York, U.S.
- Died: February 12, 2015 (aged 84); Scarborough, Maine, U.S.

Coaching career (HC unless noted)

Football
- 1962: Lebanon Valley (assistant)
- 1963–1967: Franklin & Marshall

Track
- 1962–1963: Lebanon Valley (assistant)

Wrestling
- 1962–1963: Lebanon Valley

Head coaching record
- Overall: 20–17–2 (football)

Accomplishments and honors

Championships
- Football; 1 MAC Southern College Division (1964)

George H. Storck (October 11, 1930 – February 12, 2015) was an American football coach. The head coach at Franklin & Marshall College in Lancaster, Pennsylvania, he held that position for five seasons, from 1963 until 1967. His record at Franklin & Marshall was 20–17–2.

== Biography ==
Born on October 11, 1930, in Plattsburgh, New York, Storck attended Swarthmore High School in Swarthmore, Pennsylvania.

== Head coaching record ==
=== Football ===
Year	Team	Overall	Conference	Standing	Bowl/playoffs
Franklin & Marshall Diplomats (Middle Atlantic Conference) (1963–1967)
1963	Franklin & Marshall	1–6	1–4	10th (Southern College)	
1964	Franklin & Marshall	8–0	7–0	1st (Southern College)	
1965	Franklin & Marshall	4–4	3–4	5th (Southern College)	
1966	Franklin & Marshall	3–3–2	3–2–2	3rd (Southern College)	
1967	Franklin & Marshall	4–4	4–3	3rd (Southern College)	
Franklin & Marshall:		20–17–2	18–13–2		
Total:		20–17–2			
National championship Conference title Conference division title or championship game berth
