= 1964 Yale Bulldogs football team =

American college football season

1964 Yale Bulldogs football
- Conference: Ivy League
- Record: 6–2–1 (4–2–1 Ivy)
- Head coach: John Pont (2nd season)
- Home stadium: Yale Bowl

1964 Ivy League football standings
	Conf.					Overall
Team	W		L		T	W		L		T
Princeton $	7	–	0	–	0	9	–	0	–	0
Harvard	5	–	2	–	0	6	–	3	–	0
Yale	4	–	2	–	1	6	–	2	–	1
Dartmouth	4	–	3	–	0	6	–	3	–	0
Cornell	3	–	4	–	0	3	–	5	–	1
Brown	3	–	4	–	0	5	–	4	–	0
Columbia	1	–	5	–	1	2	–	6	–	1
Penn	0	–	7	–	0	1	–	8	–	0
$ – Conference champion

The 1964 Yale Bulldogs football team represented Yale University in the 1964 NCAA University Division football season. The Bulldogs were led by second-year head coach John Pont, played their home games at the Yale Bowl and finished third in the Ivy League season with a 4–2–1 record, 6–2–1 overall.

== Schedule ==
Date	Opponent	Site	Result	Attendance	Source
September 26	Connecticut*	Yale Bowl; New Haven, CT	W 21–6	32,634	
October 3	Lehigh*	Yale Bowl; New Haven, CT	W 54–0	24,917	
October 10	Brown	Yale Bowl; New Haven, CT	W 15–7	30,728	
October 17	Columbia	Yale Bowl; New Haven, CT	T 9–9	23,055	
October 24	at Cornell	Schoellkopf Field; Ithaca, NY	W 23–21	18,000	
October 31	Dartmouth	Yale Bowl; New Haven, CT	W 24–15	47,533	
November 7	at Penn	Franklin Field; Philadelphia, PA	W 21–9	9,114	
November 14	Princeton	Yale Bowl; New Haven, CT (rivalry)	L 14–35	60,173	
November 21	at Harvard	Harvard Stadium; Boston, MA (The Game)	L 14–18	39,909	
*Non-conference game

== NFL draft ==
The following Bulldog was selected in the National Football League draft following the season.

Round	Pick	Player	Position	NFL team
3	31	Chuck Mercein	RB	New York Giants
