= 1974 Franklin & Marshall Diplomats football team =

American college football season

1974 Franklin & Marshall Diplomats football

MAC Southern Division champion
- Conference: Middle Atlantic Conference
- Southern Division
- Record: 9–0 (8–0 MAC)
- Head coach: Bob Curtis (4th season)
- Captains: Rick Davis; Bob Kaithern; Roger Smith
- Home stadium: Williamson Field

1974 Middle Atlantic Conference football standings
	Conf.					Overall
Team	W		L		T	W		L		T
Northern Division
Wilkes x	6	–	0	–	0	7	–	2	–	0
Juniata	5	–	1	–	0	7	–	2	–	0
Albright	4	–	2	–	0	6	–	3	–	0
Susquehanna	3	–	3	–	0	4	–	5	–	1
Delaware Valley	2	–	4	–	0	2	–	6	–	0
Lycoming	1	–	5	–	0	3	–	6	–	0
Upsala	0	–	6	–	0	0	–	8	–	0
Southern Division
Franklin & Marshall x	8	–	0	–	0	9	–	0	–	0
Widener	7	–	1	–	0	8	–	1	–	0
Moravian	4	–	2	–	0	5	–	5	–	0
Johns Hopkins	3	–	2	–	1	3	–	5	–	1
Dickinson	5	–	4	–	0	5	–	4	–	0
Lebanon Valley	4	–	4	–	0	5	–	4	–	0
Muhlenberg	2	–	6	–	0	2	–	7	–	0
Ursinus	1	–	5	–	1	1	–	6	–	1
Western Maryland	1	–	6	–	0	2	–	7	–	0
Swarthmore	0	–	7	–	0	0	–	7	–	0
x – Division champion/co-champions

The 1974 Franklin & Marshall Diplomats football team was an American football team that represented Franklin & Marshall College as a member of the Southern Division of the Middle Atlantic Conference (MAC) during the 1974 NCAA Division III football season. In its fourth and final season under head coach Bob Curtis, the Diplomats compiled a 9–0 record (8–0 against MAC opponents) and won the MAC College Division Southern championship. The team played its home games at Williamson Field in Lancaster, Pennsylvania. It was the fourth perfect season in the school's history. Prior perfect seasons were 1950, 1964, and 1972.

== Schedule ==
Date	Opponent	Site	Result	Attendance	Source
September 21	at Hamilton*	Clinton, NY	W 21–14	1,000	
September 28	at Ursinus	Collegeville, PA	W 45–6	1,500	
October 5	at Johns Hopkins	Homewood Field; Baltimore, MD	W 63–13	2,500	
October 12	Swarthmore	Williamson Field; Lancaster, PA	W 70–0	4,500	
October 19	Dickinson^{†}	Williamson Field; Lancaster, PA	W 54–13	5,200	
October 26	Widener	Williamson Field; Lancaster, PA	W 26–22	6,200	
November 2	at Lebanon Valley	Annville, PA	W 47–7	1,500	
November 9	Moravian	Williamson Field; Lancaster, PA	W 40–28	5,500	
November 16	at Muhlenberg	Muhlenberg Field; Allentown, PA	W 47–13	3,000–3,500	
*Non-conference game; ^{†}Homecoming
