= 1972 Franklin & Marshall Diplomats football team =

American college football season

1972 Franklin & Marshall Diplomats football

MAC Southern Division champion
- Conference: Middle Atlantic Conference
- Southern Division
- Record: 9–0 (8–0 MAC)
- Head coach: Bob Curtis (2nd season)
- Captains: Craig Marks; Bob Olender; Dan Trusky
- Home stadium: Williamson Field

1972 Middle Atlantic Conference football standings
	Conf.					Overall
Team	W		L		T	W		L		T
Northern Division
Albright x	7	–	0	–	0	8	–	1	–	0
Juniata	5	–	1	–	0	6	–	3	–	0
Wilkes	4	–	2	–	0	4	–	5	–	0
Delaware Valley	4	–	4	–	0	4	–	4	–	0
Upsala	3	–	4	–	0	3	–	5	–	0
Susquehanna	2	–	4	–	0	3	–	6	–	0
Lycoming	2	–	5	–	0	2	–	6	–	0
Wagner *	2	–	1	–	0	7	–	3	–	0
Southern Division
Franklin & Marshall x	8	–	0	–	0	9	–	0	–	0
Widener	6	–	1	–	0	8	–	1	–	0
Johns Hopkins	5	–	2	–	0	6	–	3	–	0
Ursinus	5	–	3	–	0	5	–	3	–	0
Dickinson	4	–	3	–	0	4	–	4	–	0
Lebanon Valley	4	–	5	–	0	4	–	5	–	0
Moravian	3	–	6	–	0	3	–	7	–	0
Muhlenberg	2	–	7	–	0	1	–	8	–	0
Swarthmore	1	–	7	–	0	0	–	7	–	0
Western Maryland	0	–	5	–	0	3	–	6	–	1
Haverford †	0	–	7	–	0	0	–	0	–	0
x – Division champion/co-champions; * – Ineligible due to insufficient conference games † – Haverford forfeited all games on schedule; opponents received conference victory but overall record not affected.

The 1972 Franklin & Marshall Diplomats football team was an American football team that represented Franklin & Marshall College . The team competed as a member of the Southern Division of the Middle Atlantic Conference (MAC) during the 1972 NCAA College Division football season. It played its home games at Williamson Field in Lancaster, Pennsylvania.

In its second season under head coach Bob Curtis, this team compiled a 9–0 record, including an 8–0 against MAC opponents. It won the MAC Southern Division championship. This was the third perfect season in the school's history. Additional perfect seasons were 1950, 1964, and 1974.

Franklin & Marshall's Bob Olender was the leading passer in the MAC, completing 103 of 197 passes for 1,275 yards and 12 touchdowns.

== Schedule ==
Date	Opponent	Site	Result	Attendance	Source
September 16	Carnegie Mellon*	Williamson Field; Lancaster, PA	W 22–0	4,200	
September 23	at Ursinus	Patterson Field; Collegeville, PA	W 17–0		
September 30	at Johns Hopkins	Homewood Field; Baltimore, MD	W 14–10		
October 7	Swarthmore	Williamson Field; Lancaster, PA (rivalry)	W 35–0	3,200	
October 14	Dickinson	Williamson Field; Lancaster, PA (rivalry)	W 27–7	5,200	
October 21	Widener	Williamson Field; Lancaster, PA	W 24–21	5,000	
October 28	at Lebanon Valley	Annville, PA	W 27–6	1,500	
November 4	Moravian	Williamson Field; Lancaster, PA	W 24–22	4,800	
November 11	at Muhlenberg	Allentown, PA	W 26–0		
*Non-conference game
