= Bob Curtis (American football) =

American football coach

Biographical details
- Born: June 18, 1935; Utica, New York, U.S.
- Died: August 18, 2013 (aged 78); Northumberland, Pennsylvania, U.S.

Coaching career (HC unless noted)
- 1963–1967: Waldwick HS (NJ)
- 1968–1970: Franklin & Marshall (assistant)
- 1971–1974: Franklin & Marshall
- 1975–1985: Bucknell

Head coaching record
- Overall: 80–59–3 (college); 12–20–3 (high school)

Accomplishments and honors

Championships
- 4 MAC Southern Division (1971–1974)

Robert D. Curtis (June 18, 1935 – August 18, 2013) was an American football coach. He served as the head football coach at Franklin & Marshall College from 1971 to 1974 and Bucknell University from 1975 to 1985, compiling a career college football coaching record of 80–59–3.

== Coaching career ==
=== Waldwick High School ===
Curtis was the first head football coach at Waldwick High School in Waldwick, New Jersey. He led the Waldwick Warriors to a record of 12–20–3 in five seasons, from the school's opening in 1963 through the 1967 season.

=== Franklin & Marshall ===
Curtis was the head football coach at Franklin & Marshall College in Lancaster, Pennsylvania for four seasons, from 1971 until 1974. His coaching record at Franklin & Marshall was 32–3.

=== Bucknell ===
Curtis was the head football coach at Bucknell University in Lewisburg, Pennsylvania. He held the position from 1975 through the 1985 season and compiled a record of 48–56–3 (.463).

== Death ==
Curtis died on August 18, 2013, at Nottingham Village in Northumberland, Pennsylvania.

== Head coaching record ==
=== College ===
Year	Team	Overall	Conference	Standing	Bowl/playoffs
Franklin & Marshall Diplomats (Middle Atlantic Conference) (1971–1974)
1971	Franklin & Marshall	6–2	6–1	1st (Southern)	
1972	Franklin & Marshall	9–0	8–0	1st (Southern)	
1973	Franklin & Marshall	8–1	8–1	1st (Southern)	
1974	Franklin & Marshall	9–0	8–0	1st (Southern)	
Franklin & Marshall:		32–3	30–2		
Bucknell Bison (NCAA Division II independent) (1975–1977)
1975	Bucknell	5–5			
1976	Bucknell	4–5			
1977	Bucknell	4–5			
Bucknell Bison (NCAA Division I-AA independent) (1978–1985)
1978	Bucknell	5–5			
1979	Bucknell	4–4–2			
1980	Bucknell	6–4			
1981	Bucknell	4–6			
1982	Bucknell	4–6			
1983	Bucknell	4–5–1			
1984	Bucknell	5–5			
1985	Bucknell	3–7			
Bucknell:		48–56–3			
Total:		80–59–3			
National championship Conference title Conference division title or championship game berth
