= 1964 Harvard Crimson football team =

American college football season

1964 Harvard Crimson football
- Conference: Ivy League
- Record: 6–3 (5–2 Ivy)
- Head coach: John Yovicsin (8th season)
- Defensive coordinator: James S. Lentz (3rd season)
- Captain: John F. O’Brien
- Home stadium: Harvard Stadium

1964 Ivy League football standings
	Conf.					Overall
Team	W		L		T	W		L		T
Princeton $	7	–	0	–	0	9	–	0	–	0
Harvard	5	–	2	–	0	6	–	3	–	0
Yale	4	–	2	–	1	6	–	2	–	1
Dartmouth	4	–	3	–	0	6	–	3	–	0
Cornell	3	–	4	–	0	3	–	5	–	1
Brown	3	–	4	–	0	5	–	4	–	0
Columbia	1	–	5	–	1	2	–	6	–	1
Penn	0	–	7	–	0	1	–	8	–	0
$ – Conference champion

The 1964 Harvard Crimson football team was an American football team that represented Harvard University during the 1964 NCAA University Division football season. Harvard finished second in the Ivy League.

In their eighth year under head coach John Yovicsin, the Crimson compiled a 6–3 record and outscored opponents 131 to 123. John F. O’Brien was the team captain.

Harvard's 5–2 conference record was the second-best in the Ivy League standings. The Crimson outscored Ivy opponents 90 to 85.

Harvard played its home games at Harvard Stadium in the Allston neighborhood of Boston, Massachusetts.

== Schedule ==
Date	Opponent	Site	Result	Attendance	Source
September 26	UMass*	Harvard Stadium; Boston, MA	W 20–14	20,000–21,000	
October 3	Bucknell*	Harvard Stadium; Boston, MA	L 21–24	14,000	
October 10	at Columbia	Baker Field; New York, NY	W 3–0	24,780	
October 17	Cornell	Harvard Stadium; Boston, MA	W 16–0	8,000	
October 24	Dartmouth	Harvard Stadium; Boston, MA (rivalry)	L 0–48	32,500	
October 31	Penn	Harvard Stadium; Boston, MA (rivalry)	W 34–0	10,000	
November 7	at Princeton	Palmer Stadium; Princeton, NJ	L 0–16	39,000	
November 14	Brown	Harvard Stadium; Boston, MA	W 19–7	15,000	
November 21	Yale	Harvard Stadium; Boston, MA (The Game)	W 18–14	39,909	
*Non-conference game
