= 1964 Connecticut Huskies football team =

American college football season

1964 Connecticut Huskies football
- Conference: Yankee Conference
- Record: 4–4–1 (2–1–1 Yankee)
- Head coach: Rick Forzano (1st season)
- Home stadium: Memorial Stadium

1964 Yankee Conference football standings
	Conf.					Overall
Team	W		L		T	W		L		T
UMass $	5	–	0	–	0	8	–	2	–	0
Vermont	3	–	1	–	0	7	–	1	–	0
Connecticut	2	–	1	–	1	4	–	4	–	1
Maine	2	–	3	–	0	5	–	3	–	0
Rhode Island	1	–	4	–	0	3	–	7	–	0
New Hampshire	0	–	4	–	1	1	–	6	–	1
$ – Conference champion

The 1964 Connecticut Huskies football team represented the University of Connecticut as a member of the Yankee Conference during the 1964 NCAA College Division football season. Led by first-year head coach Rick Forzano, Huskies compiled an overall record of 4–4–1 with a mark of 2–1–1 in conference play, placing third in the Yankee Conference.

== Schedule ==
Date	Opponent	Site	Result	Attendance	Source
September 26	at Yale*	Yale Bowl; New Haven, CT	L 6–21	32,634	
October 3	at Rutgers*	Rutgers Stadium; New Brunswick, NJ	L 3–9	15,000	
October 10	at UMass	Alumni Field; Amherst, MA (rivalry)	L 0–30	7,100	
October 17	Maine	Memorial Stadium; Storrs, CT	W 14–13	7,500–7,663	
October 24	Temple*	Memorial Stadium; Storrs, CT	W 25–7	8,635	
October 31	at New Hampshire	Cowell Stadium; Durham, NH	T 0–0	3,500	
November 7	Boston University*	Memorial Stadium; Storrs, CT	W 17–16	9,524	
November 14	Rhode Island	Memorial Stadium; Storrs, CT (rivalry)	W 28–7	11,000–11,825	
November 21	at Holy Cross*	Fitton Field; Worcester, MA	L 6–20	7,500	
*Non-conference game
