= 1964 Rutgers Scarlet Knights football team =

American college football season

1964 Rutgers Scarlet Knights football

Middle Three champion
- Conference: Middle Three Conference
- Record: 6–3 (2–0 Middle Three)
- Head coach: John F. Bateman (5th season)
- Captain: Robert Norton
- Home stadium: Rutgers Stadium

1964 Middle Three Conference football standings
| | Conf. | | | | | Overall |
| Team | W | | L | | T | W | | L | | T |
|---|---|---|---|---|---|---|---|---|---|---|
| Rutgers $ | 2 | – | 0 | – | 0 | 6 | – | 3 | – | 0 |
| Lehigh | 0 | – | 1 | – | 1 | 1 | – | 7 | – | 1 |
| Lafayette | 0 | – | 1 | – | 1 | 0 | – | 7 | – | 2 |
$ – Conference champion

The 1964 Rutgers Scarlet Knights football team represented Rutgers University in the 1964 NCAA University Division football season.

In their fifth season under head coach John F. Bateman, the Scarlet Knights compiled a 6–3 record, won the Middle Three Conference championship, and outscored their opponents 149 to 115.

The team's statistical leaders included Roger Kalinger with 916 passing yards, Bob Brendel with 464 rushing yards, and Jack Emmer with 306 receiving yards. Defensively, Rutgers was powered by its "Golden Nugget" defense led by defensive coordinator, Dewey King, which ranked 5th nationally in rushing defense allowing only 84.1 yards per-game. The defensive front seven was led by linebackers Tom Connelly, Dom Viggiano, Bob Schroeder and Bob Norton. Garth Weber, Werner Fentrop and Jerry Sertek anchored the defensive line. The Rutgers "Golden Nuggets" ended the 1964 season ranked 20th overall in total defense.

The Scarlet Knights played their home games at Rutgers Stadium in Piscataway, New Jersey, across the river from the university's main campus in New Brunswick.

== Schedule ==
| Date | Opponent | Site | Result | Attendance | Source |
|---|---|---|---|---|---|
| September 26 | at Princeton* | Palmer Stadium; Princeton, NJ (rivalry) | L 7–10 | 38,000 | |
| October 3 | Connecticut* | Rutgers Stadium; Piscataway, NJ | W 9–3 | 15,000 | |
| October 10 | at Lehigh | Taylor Stadium; Bethlehem, PA | W 20–7 | 7,500 | |
| October 17 | at Penn* | Franklin Field; Philadelphia, PA | W 10–7 | 7,178 | |
| October 24 | at Columbia* | Baker Field; New York, NY | W 38–35 | 10,237 | |
| October 31 | Boston University* | Rutgers Stadium; Piscataway, NJ | W 9–0 | 14,000 | |
| November 7 | Lafayette | Rutgers Stadium; Piscataway, NJ | W 31–6 | 13,000 | |
| November 14 | at Delaware* | Delaware Stadium; Newark, DE | L 18–27 | 8,266 | |
| November 21 | Colgate* | Rutgers Stadium; Piscataway, NJ | L 7–20 | 17,000 | |
*Non-conference game
