= 1964 UMass Redmen football team =

American college football season

1964 UMass Redmen football

Yankee Conference champion

Tangerine Bowl, L 13–14 vs. East Carolina
- Conference: Yankee Conference

Ranking
- Coaches: No. 3
- AP: No. 7
- Record: 8–2 (5–0 Yankee)
- Head coach: Vic Fusia (4th season)
- Home stadium: Alumni Field

1964 Yankee Conference football standings
	Conf.					Overall
Team	W		L		T	W		L		T
UMass $	5	–	0	–	0	8	–	2	–	0
Vermont	3	–	1	–	0	7	–	1	–	0
Connecticut	2	–	1	–	1	4	–	4	–	1
Maine	2	–	3	–	0	5	–	3	–	0
Rhode Island	1	–	4	–	0	3	–	7	–	0
New Hampshire	0	–	4	–	1	1	–	6	–	1
$ – Conference champion

The 1964 UMass Redmen football team represented the University of Massachusetts Amherst in the 1964 NCAA College Division football season as a member of the Yankee Conference. The team was coached by Vic Fusia and played its home games at Alumni Field in Amherst, Massachusetts. The 1964 season was the Redmen's last at Alumni Field, as they would move to the new Alumni Stadium at the south end of campus in 1965. The Redmen repeated as conference champions, and earned an appearance in the 1964 Tangerine Bowl, which at the time served as the NCAA Atlantic Coast Small College Championship. This was the first postseason bowl game in team history. Though the Redmen jumped out to an early 13–0 lead, they tired late and fell to East Carolina, 14–13. UMass finished the season with a record of 8–2 overall and 5–0 in conference play.

== Schedule ==
Date	Opponent	Rank	Site	Result	Attendance	Source
September 19	Maine		Alumni Field; Amherst, MA	W 6–0	10,280–10,500	
September 26	at Harvard*		Harvard Stadium; Boston, MA	L 14–20	20,000–21,000	
October 3	at Buffalo*		Rotary Field; Buffalo, NY (rivalry)	W 24–22	9,700–9,754	
October 10	Connecticut		Alumni Field; Amherst, MA (rivalry)	W 30–0	7,100	
October 17	at Rhode Island		Meade Stadium; Kingston, RI	W 7–0	1,500–3,000	
October 24	Boston University*		Alumni Field; Amherst, MA	W 28–7	10,800	
October 31	at Vermont	No. T–10	Centennial Field; Burlington, VT	W 28–7	8,500	
November 7	at Holy Cross*	No. 10	Fitton Field; Worcester, MA	W 25–6	20,000	
November 14	New Hampshire	No. 8	Alumni Field; Amherst, MA (rivalry)	W 47–0	7,500	
December 12	vs. No. 8 East Carolina*	No. 7	Tangerine Bowl; Orlando, FL (Tangerine Bowl)	L 13–14	8,000	
*Non-conference game; Rankings from AP Poll released prior to the game
