= 1964 Lafayette Leopards football team =

American college football season

1964 Lafayette Leopards football
- Conference: Middle Atlantic Conference
- University Division
- Record: 0–7–2 (0–4–2 MAC)
- Head coach: Kenneth Bunn (2nd season)
- Captains: Douglas Dill; George Hossenlopp
- Home stadium: Fisher Field

1964 Middle Atlantic Conference football standings
	Conf.					Overall
Team	W		L		T	W		L		T
University Division
Gettysburg x	5	–	1	–	0	7	–	2	–	0
Bucknell	4	–	1	–	0	7	–	2	–	0
Temple	4	–	1	–	0	7	–	2	–	0
Delaware	3	–	3	–	0	4	–	5	–	0
Lafayette	0	–	4	–	2	0	–	7	–	2
Hofstra	0	–	3	–	1	6	–	3	–	1
Lehigh	0	–	3	–	1	1	–	7	–	1
Northern College Division
Wagner x	5	–	0	–	0	10	–	0	–	0
Albright	6	–	1	–	0	8	–	1	–	0
Juniata	3	–	3	–	0	4	–	4	–	0
Moravian	3	–	4	–	0	4	–	4	–	0
Upsala	2	–	4	–	0	3	–	5	–	0
Wilkes	1	–	5	–	0	1	–	6	–	0
Lycoming	1	–	5	–	0	1	–	7	–	0
Susquehanna *	2	–	0	–	0	7	–	2	–	0
Southern College Division
Franklin & Marshall x	7	–	0	–	0	8	–	0	–	0
Drexel	4	–	1	–	0	7	–	2	–	0
Muhlenberg	5	–	3	–	0	5	–	4	–	0
Lebanon Valley	4	–	4	–	0	4	–	4	–	0
Pennsylvania Military	4	–	4	–	0	4	–	5	–	0
Swarthmore	3	–	3	–	0	3	–	4	–	0
Dickinson	4	–	5	–	0	4	–	5	–	0
Western Maryland	2	–	4	–	0	4	–	5	–	0
Johns Hopkins	2	–	4	–	0	2	–	6	–	0
Ursinus	2	–	5	–	0	2	–	6	–	0
Haverford	0	–	5	–	0	0	–	6	–	1
West Chester *	0	–	0	–	0	6	–	2	–	0
x – Division champion/co-champions; * – Ineligible for championship due to insufficient conference games

The 1964 Lafayette Leopards football team was an American football team that represented Lafayette College during the 1964 NCAA College Division football season. Lafayette tied for last place in both the Middle Atlantic Conference, University Division, and the Middle Three Conference.

In their second year under head coach Kenneth Bunn, the Leopards compiled an 0–7–2 record. Douglas Dill and George Hossenlopp were the team captains.

At 0–4–2 against MAC University Division foes, Lafayette was one of three teams without a win in conference play, along with Hofstra, playing its first year in the division, and Lehigh, both of which finished 0–3–1. Lafayette went 0–1–1 against the Middle Three, losing to Rutgers and tying Lehigh.

Lafayette played its home games at Fisher Field on College Hill in Easton, Pennsylvania.

== Schedule ==
Date	Opponent	Site	Result	Attendance	Source
September 26	at Brown*	Brown Stadium; Providence, RI	L 3–20	9,200	
October 3	Hofstra	Fisher Field; Easton, PA	T 7–7	4,000	
October 10	at No. 6 Delaware	Delaware Stadium; Newark, DE	L 0–28	9,389	
October 17	Temple	Fisher Field; Easton, PA	L 18–38	4,000	
October 24	at No. 18 Bucknell	Memorial Stadium; Lewisburg, PA	L 12–54	7,500–8,000	
October 31	No. 11 Gettysburg	Fisher Field; Easton, PA	L 3–21	6,000	
November 7	at Rutgers	Rutgers Stadium; Piscataway, NJ	L 6–31	13,000	
November 14	at Davidson*	Richardson Stadium; Davidson, NC	L 12–31	5,800	
November 21	Lehigh	Fisher Field; Easton, PA (The Rivalry)	T 6–6	19,000	
*Non-conference game; Rankings from UPI Poll released prior to the game
