= 1964 Franklin & Marshall Diplomats football team =

American college football season

1964 Franklin & Marshall Diplomats football

MAC Southern College Division champion
- Conference: Middle Atlantic Conference
- Southern College
- Record: 8–0 (7–0 MAC)
- Head coach: George H. Storck (2nd season)
- Captains: Larry Graham; Rick Johnson
- Home stadium: Williamson Field

1964 Middle Atlantic Conference football standings
	Conf.					Overall
Team	W		L		T	W		L		T
University Division
Gettysburg x	5	–	1	–	0	7	–	2	–	0
Bucknell	4	–	1	–	0	7	–	2	–	0
Temple	4	–	1	–	0	7	–	2	–	0
Delaware	3	–	3	–	0	4	–	5	–	0
Lafayette	0	–	4	–	2	0	–	7	–	2
Hofstra	0	–	3	–	1	6	–	3	–	1
Lehigh	0	–	3	–	1	1	–	7	–	1
Northern College Division
Wagner x	5	–	0	–	0	10	–	0	–	0
Albright	6	–	1	–	0	8	–	1	–	0
Juniata	3	–	3	–	0	4	–	4	–	0
Moravian	3	–	4	–	0	4	–	4	–	0
Upsala	2	–	4	–	0	3	–	5	–	0
Wilkes	1	–	5	–	0	1	–	6	–	0
Lycoming	1	–	5	–	0	1	–	7	–	0
Susquehanna *	2	–	0	–	0	7	–	2	–	0
Southern College Division
Franklin & Marshall x	7	–	0	–	0	8	–	0	–	0
Drexel	4	–	1	–	0	7	–	2	–	0
Muhlenberg	5	–	3	–	0	5	–	4	–	0
Lebanon Valley	4	–	4	–	0	4	–	4	–	0
Pennsylvania Military	4	–	4	–	0	4	–	5	–	0
Swarthmore	3	–	3	–	0	3	–	4	–	0
Dickinson	4	–	5	–	0	4	–	5	–	0
Western Maryland	2	–	4	–	0	4	–	5	–	0
Johns Hopkins	2	–	4	–	0	2	–	6	–	0
Ursinus	2	–	5	–	0	2	–	6	–	0
Haverford	0	–	5	–	0	0	–	6	–	1
West Chester *	0	–	0	–	0	6	–	2	–	0
x – Division champion/co-champions; * – Ineligible for championship due to insufficient conference games

The 1964 Franklin & Marshall Diplomats football team was an American football team that represented Franklin & Marshall College as a member of the Southern College Division of the Middle Atlantic Conference (MAC) during the 1964 NCAA College Division football season. The team played its home games at Williamson Field in Lancaster, Pennsylvania.

During its second season under head coach George H. Storck, this team compiled an 8–0 record (7–0 against MAC opponents) and won the MAC Southern College Division championship. It was the second perfect season in the school's history. Additional perfect seasons were 1950, 1972, and 1974.

Franklin & Marshall's triple-threat quarterback Seiki Murono was selected as the most valuable player in the Southern Division of the MAC. He also received the 1964 Maxwell Club Award.

== Schedule ==
Date	Opponent	Site	Result	Attendance	Source
October 3	at Johns Hopkins	Homewood Field; Baltimore, MD	W 21–6	2,500	
October 10	at Swarthmore	Clothier Field; Swarthmore, PA	W 21–12	3,000	
October 17	at Dickinson	Biddle Field; Carlisle, PA	W 6–5	5,000	
October 24	Carnegie Tech*	Williamson Field; Lancaster, PA	W 18–14	7,000	
October 31	Haverford	Williamson Field; Lancaster, PA	W 14–6	4,000	
November 7	Pennsylvania Military	Williamson Field; Lancaster, PA	W 19–17		
November 14	at Muhlenberg	Allentown, PA	W 29–22		
November 21	Ursinus	Williamson Field; Lancaster, PA	W 20–6		
*Non-conference game
