= 1964 Vermont Catamounts football team =

American college football season

1964 Vermont Catamounts football
- Conference: Yankee Conference
- Record: 7–1 (3–1 Yankee)
- Head coach: Bob Clifford (3rd season)
- Home stadium: Centennial Field

1964 Yankee Conference football standings
| | Conf. | | | | | Overall |
| Team | W | | L | | T | W | | L | | T |
|---|---|---|---|---|---|---|---|---|---|---|
| UMass $ | 5 | – | 0 | – | 0 | 8 | – | 2 | – | 0 |
| Vermont | 3 | – | 1 | – | 0 | 7 | – | 1 | – | 0 |
| Connecticut | 2 | – | 1 | – | 1 | 4 | – | 4 | – | 1 |
| Maine | 2 | – | 3 | – | 0 | 5 | – | 3 | – | 0 |
| Rhode Island | 1 | – | 4 | – | 0 | 3 | – | 7 | – | 0 |
| New Hampshire | 0 | – | 4 | – | 1 | 1 | – | 6 | – | 1 |
$ – Conference champion

The 1964 Vermont Catamounts football team represented the Vermont Catamounts football team of the University of Vermont during the 1964 NCAA College Division football season. The season would mark the first time that Vermont defeated rival Maine in over forty years. With a 7–1 record (3–1 in the Yankee Conference), this was Vermont's most successful season.

== Schedule ==
| Date | Opponent | Site | Result | Attendance | Source |
|---|---|---|---|---|---|
| September 19 | American International* | Centennial Field; Burlington, VT | W 14–6 | 6,000 | |
| September 26 | at WPI* | Alumni Stadium; Worcester, MA | W 41–6 | 2,500 | |
| October 3 | Maine^{†} | Centennial Field; Burlington, VT | W 14–7 | 7,500 | |
| October 10 | at Rhode Island | Meade Stadium; Kingston, RI | W 16–8 | 10,300–10,318 | |
| October 17 | at New Hampshire | Alumni Field; Durham, NH | W 40–0 | 8,000–8,200 | |
| October 24 | at Norwich* | Sabine Field; Northfield, VT | W 21–17 | 5,000 | |
| October 31 | No. T–10 UMass | Centennial Field; Burlington, VT | L 7–28 | 8,500 | |
| November 7 | Middlebury* | Centennial Field; Burlington, VT | W 12–0 | 6,300 | |
*Non-conference game; ^{†}Homecoming; Rankings from AP Poll released prior to the game
