= 1964 Hofstra Flying Dutchmen football team =

American college football season

1964 Hofstra Flying Dutchmen football
- Conference: Middle Atlantic Conference
- University Division
- Record: 6–3–1 (0–3–1 MAC)
- Head coach: Howdy Myers (15th season)
- Captains: Don Cummings; Carmine Limone
- Home stadium: Hofstra Stadium

1964 Middle Atlantic Conference football standings
	Conf.					Overall
Team	W		L		T	W		L		T
University Division
Gettysburg x	5	–	1	–	0	7	–	2	–	0
Bucknell	4	–	1	–	0	7	–	2	–	0
Temple	4	–	1	–	0	7	–	2	–	0
Delaware	3	–	3	–	0	4	–	5	–	0
Lafayette	0	–	4	–	2	0	–	7	–	2
Hofstra	0	–	3	–	1	6	–	3	–	1
Lehigh	0	–	3	–	1	1	–	7	–	1
Northern College Division
Wagner x	5	–	0	–	0	10	–	0	–	0
Albright	6	–	1	–	0	8	–	1	–	0
Juniata	3	–	3	–	0	4	–	4	–	0
Moravian	3	–	4	–	0	4	–	4	–	0
Upsala	2	–	4	–	0	3	–	5	–	0
Wilkes	1	–	5	–	0	1	–	6	–	0
Lycoming	1	–	5	–	0	1	–	7	–	0
Susquehanna *	2	–	0	–	0	7	–	2	–	0
Southern College Division
Franklin & Marshall x	7	–	0	–	0	8	–	0	–	0
Drexel	4	–	1	–	0	7	–	2	–	0
Muhlenberg	5	–	3	–	0	5	–	4	–	0
Lebanon Valley	4	–	4	–	0	4	–	4	–	0
Pennsylvania Military	4	–	4	–	0	4	–	5	–	0
Swarthmore	3	–	3	–	0	3	–	4	–	0
Dickinson	4	–	5	–	0	4	–	5	–	0
Western Maryland	2	–	4	–	0	4	–	5	–	0
Johns Hopkins	2	–	4	–	0	2	–	6	–	0
Ursinus	2	–	5	–	0	2	–	6	–	0
Haverford	0	–	5	–	0	0	–	6	–	1
West Chester *	0	–	0	–	0	6	–	2	–	0
x – Division champion/co-champions; * – Ineligible for championship due to insufficient conference games

The 1964 Hofstra Flying Dutchmen football team was an American football team that represented Hofstra College during the 1964 NCAA College Division football season. In its first year competing in the Middle Atlantic Conference, University Division, Hofstra tied for last place.

In their 15th year under head coach Howard "Howdy" Myers Jr., the Flying Dutchmen compiled a 6–3–1 record, and outscored opponents 180 to 135. Don Cummings and Carmine Limone were the team captains.

After six years playing a mostly non-league schedule while nominally belonging to the less competitive MAC College–Northern Division, Hofstra football moved up to the MAC University Division in time for the start of the 1964 season. Despite posting an overall winning record, however, Hofstra was winless against its new division rivals. The Flying Dutchmen (0–3–1) tied for last place with Lehigh (also 0–3–1) and Lafayette (0–4–2). Hofstra won all of its non-league games.

The Flying Dutchmen played their first full year of home games at Hofstra Stadium in Hempstead on Long Island, New York.

== Schedule ==
Date	Opponent	Site	Result	Attendance	Source
September 19	at Gettysburg	Memorial Field; Gettysburg, PA	L 7–27	4,000	
September 26	at Delaware	Delaware Stadium; Newark, DE	L 7–36	9,433	
October 3	at Lafayette	Fisher Field; Easton, PA	T 7–7	4,000	
October 10	at Bridgeport*	Hedges Stadium; Bridgeport, CT	W 27–8	1,500–2,500	
October 24	Southern Connecticut*	Hofstra Stadium; Hempstead, NY	W 26–10	6,000	
October 31	American International*	Hofstra Stadium; Hempstead, NY	W 12–0	3,000	
November 7	at Rhode Island*	Meade Stadium; Kingston, RI	W 28–7	4,000–4,500	
November 14	Merchant Marine*	Hofstra Stadium; Hempstead, NY	W 14–12	5,500	
November 21	at Temple	Temple Stadium; Philadelphia, PA	L 6–21	6,500	
November 26	at C.W. Post*	Post Bowl; Brookville, NY	W 46–7	5,532	
*Non-conference game
