= 1964 Drexel Dragons football team =

American college football season

1964 Drexel Dragons football
- Conference: Middle Atlantic Conference
- Southern College Division
- Record: 7–2 (4–1 MAC)
- Head coach: Tom Grebis (4th season)
- Home stadium: Drexel Field

1964 Middle Atlantic Conference football standings
	Conf.					Overall
Team	W		L		T	W		L		T
University Division
Gettysburg x	5	–	1	–	0	7	–	2	–	0
Bucknell	4	–	1	–	0	7	–	2	–	0
Temple	4	–	1	–	0	7	–	2	–	0
Delaware	3	–	3	–	0	4	–	5	–	0
Lafayette	0	–	4	–	2	0	–	7	–	2
Hofstra	0	–	3	–	1	6	–	3	–	1
Lehigh	0	–	3	–	1	1	–	7	–	1
Northern College Division
Wagner x	5	–	0	–	0	10	–	0	–	0
Albright	6	–	1	–	0	8	–	1	–	0
Juniata	3	–	3	–	0	4	–	4	–	0
Moravian	3	–	4	–	0	4	–	4	–	0
Upsala	2	–	4	–	0	3	–	5	–	0
Wilkes	1	–	5	–	0	1	–	6	–	0
Lycoming	1	–	5	–	0	1	–	7	–	0
Susquehanna *	2	–	0	–	0	7	–	2	–	0
Southern College Division
Franklin & Marshall x	7	–	0	–	0	8	–	0	–	0
Drexel	4	–	1	–	0	7	–	2	–	0
Muhlenberg	5	–	3	–	0	5	–	4	–	0
Lebanon Valley	4	–	4	–	0	4	–	4	–	0
Pennsylvania Military	4	–	4	–	0	4	–	5	–	0
Swarthmore	3	–	3	–	0	3	–	4	–	0
Dickinson	4	–	5	–	0	4	–	5	–	0
Western Maryland	2	–	4	–	0	4	–	5	–	0
Johns Hopkins	2	–	4	–	0	2	–	6	–	0
Ursinus	2	–	5	–	0	2	–	6	–	0
Haverford	0	–	5	–	0	0	–	6	–	1
West Chester *	0	–	0	–	0	6	–	2	–	0
x – Division champion/co-champions; * – Ineligible for championship due to insufficient conference games

The 1964 Drexel Dragons football team represented the Drexel Institute of Technology (renamed Drexel University in 1970) as a member of the Middle Atlantic Conference during the 1964 NCAA College Division football season. Tom Grebis was the team's head coach.

== Schedule ==
Date	Time	Opponent	Site	Result	Attendance	Source
September 26		Glassboro State*	Drexel Field; Philadelphia, PA	W 27–0	2,500	
October 3		at Howard*	Washington, DC	W 19–18	2,000	
October 10	1:30 pm	at Lycoming	College Field; Williamsport, PA	W 15–7	3,000	
October 17	1:30 pm	at Wagner	Grymes Hill Stadium; Staten Island, NY	L 0–21	3,500	
October 24	1:30 pm	Delaware Valley*	Drexel Field; Philadelphia, PA	W 39–0	1,500	
October 31	1:30 pm	Pennsylvania Military^{†}	Drexel Field; Philadelphia, PA	W 34–0	4,500	
November 7	1:30 pm	at Merchant Marine*	Tomb Field; Kings Point, NY	L 14–15	2,500	
November 14		Western Maryland	Drexel Field; Philadelphia, PA	W 34–6	1,500	
November 21	1:30 pm	Dickinson	Drexel Field; Philadelphia, PA	W 24–19	2,000	
*Non-conference game; ^{†}Homecoming; All times are in Eastern time

== Roster ==
1964 Drexel Dragons football team roster
Players
Coaches
Offense

Pos.	#	Name	Class
TE, DE	41	Russ DeLuca	Jr
OT, DT	54	Mike Higgins	Jr
G, NG	61	Chuck Niessner	Sr
C, LB	50	Tom McVeigh	Jr
G, LB	63	Tony Giuliante	Jr
OT, DT	49	Norm Shotwell	Jr
TE, S	40	Chuck Farrell	Jr
HB, CB	25	Dave Leahy	Sr
HB, CB	27	Rich Thatcher	Sr
FB, S	31	Bruno Ceccarelli	Sr
QB	17	Fran Crovetti	Sr
OT, DT	57	Mike Mulroy	So
OT, DE	64	Chuck Hammond	So
G, NG	65	Vince DiBianca	So
G, NG	58	Bob Steel	Jr
G, LB	48	George Guerra	Sr
G, LB	62	Bob Karcher	So
C, DT	52	John Boyd	So
C, DT	53	Pete Molluro	So
C, NG	55	Bob Muntz	Jr
TE, DE	42	Larry Veit	Jr
TE, DE	43	Charlie Walters	So
TE, DE	45	Tony Godonis	So
HB	22	Ed Bogdan	Sr
HB, S	19	Dennis Wilcox	So
HB	21	Frank O'Donnell	So
HB, CB	24	Tom Moore	So
HB	29	Joe Siderio	So
HB, CB	36	Bob Frizell	So
FB, DE	33	John Plaxa	So
FB, LB	37	Carmen Calabrese	So
FB, P	32	Ken Wise	So
QB, CB	18	Don Harmatuck	Jr

Defense

Pos.	#	Name	Class
DE	30	Skip Lombardi	Jr
DE, TE	39	Mike Paulonis	So
LB, G	60	Bill Whitorff	Sr
S, P	16	John Kuzan	So

Special teams

Pos.	#	Name	Class
K, TE	44	Irv Campbell	Jr

Head coach

- Tom Grebis (Drexel)

Coordinators/assistant coaches

- Herman Epstein (Maryland)
- Joe Renaldi (McDaniel)
- Don Shank (Penn State)
- Joe Vetter (Drexel)

Legend

- (C) Team captain
- (S) Suspended
- (I) Ineligible
- Injured
- Redshirt
