= 1964 Columbia Lions football team =

American college football season

1964 Columbia Lions football
- Conference: Ivy League
- Record: 2–6–1 (1–5–1 Ivy)
- Head coach: Aldo Donelli (8th season)
- Captain: Edward C. Malmstrom
- Home stadium: Baker Field

1964 Ivy League football standings
	Conf.					Overall
Team	W		L		T	W		L		T
Princeton $	7	–	0	–	0	9	–	0	–	0
Harvard	5	–	2	–	0	6	–	3	–	0
Yale	4	–	2	–	1	6	–	2	–	1
Dartmouth	4	–	3	–	0	6	–	3	–	0
Cornell	3	–	4	–	0	3	–	5	–	1
Brown	3	–	4	–	0	5	–	4	–	0
Columbia	1	–	5	–	1	2	–	6	–	1
Penn	0	–	7	–	0	1	–	8	–	0
$ – Conference champion

The 1964 Columbia Lions football team was an American football team that represented Columbia University during the 1964 NCAA University Division football season. Columbia finished second-to-last in the Ivy League.

In their eighth season under head coach Aldo "Buff" Donelli, the Lions compiled a 2–6–1 record and were outscored 194 to 145. Edward C. Malmstrom was the team captain.

The Lions' 1–5–1 conference record placed seventh in the Ivy League standings. Columbia was outscored 142 to 89 by Ivy opponents.

Columbia played its home games at Baker Field in Upper Manhattan, in New York City.

== Schedule ==
Date	Opponent	Site	Result	Attendance	Source
September 26	Colgate*	Baker Field; New York, NY	W 21–14	28,000	
October 3	at Princeton	Palmer Stadium; Princeton, NJ	L 13–23	22,000	
October 10	Harvard	Baker Field; New York, NY	L 0–3	24,780	
October 17	at Yale	Yale Bowl; New Haven, CT	T 9–9	23,055	
October 24	Rutgers*	Baker Field; New York, NY	L 35–38	10,237	
October 31	Cornell^{†}	Baker Field; New York, NY	L 20–57	11,333	
November 7	at Dartmouth	Memorial Field; Hanover, NH	L 14–31	10,543	
November 14	Penn	Baker Field; New York, NY	W 33–12	9,363	
November 21	at Brown	Brown Stadium; Providence, RI	L 0–7	8,100	
*Non-conference game; ^{†}Homecoming
