= John F. Bateman =

American football player and coach (1913–1998)

Biographical details
- Born: 1913
- Died: January 1, 1998 (aged 84); New London, New Hampshire, U.S.

Playing career
- 1935–1937: Columbia
- Position: Guard

Coaching career (HC unless noted)
- 1946–1956: Columbia (assistant)
- 1957–1959: Penn (line)
- 1960–1972: Rutgers

Head coaching record
- Overall: 73–51

Accomplishments and honors

Championships
- 2 Middle Atlantic (1960–1961); 11 Middle Three (1960–1968, 1970, 1972)

John F. Bateman (1913 – January 1, 1998) was an American football player and coach. He served as the head football coach at Rutgers University from 1960 to 1972, compiling a record of 73–51. Bateman played college football at Columbia University, from which he graduated in 1938. He was voted co-captain of the Columbia Lions football team in 1937. Bateman died at the age of 83 on January 1, 1998 in New London, New Hampshire.

== Head coaching record ==
Year	Team	Overall	Conference	Standing	Bowl/playoffs	Coaches^{#}	AP^{°}
Rutgers Scarlet Knights (Middle Atlantic Conference / Middle Three Conference) (1960–1961)
1960	Rutgers	8–1	4–0 / 2–0	1st (University) / 1st			
1961	Rutgers	9–0	4–0 / 2–0	1st (University) / 1st			15
Rutgers Scarlet Knights (Middle Three Conference) (1962–1972)
1962	Rutgers	5–5	2–0	1st			
1963	Rutgers	3–6	2–0	1st			
1964	Rutgers	6–3	2–0	1st			
1965	Rutgers	3–6	1–1	T–1st			
1966	Rutgers	5–4	2–0	1st			
1967	Rutgers	4–5	2–0	1st			
1968	Rutgers	8–2	2–0	1st			
1969	Rutgers	6–3	1–1	2nd			
1970	Rutgers	5–5	1–1	T–1st			
1971	Rutgers	4–7	0–2	3rd			
1972	Rutgers	7–4	2–0	1st			
Rutgers:		73–51	25–5				
Total:		73–51					
National championship Conference title Conference division title or championship game berth
